= List of Belgian films of the 2010s =

A list of films produced in Belgium ordered by year of release. For an alphabetical list of Belgian films see Category:Belgian films

== 2010 ==
English title (original title)	Original language	Director	Cast	Genre	Notes
22nd of May (22 Mei)	Dutch	Koen Mortier	Sam Louwyck, Titus De Voogdt	Thriller	
Wolf	Dutch	Rik Daniëls	Axel Daeseleire	Crime	
Oxygen (Adem)	Dutch	Hans Van Nuffel	Marie Vinck, Gijs Scholten van Aschat, Wouter Hendrickx	Drama	Gross box office revenue in Belgium: €565,675
Bo	Dutch	Hans Herbots	Ella-June Henrard	Drama	
Turqoise (Turquaze)	Dutch	Kadir Balci	Charlotte Vandermeersch	Drama	
Illegal	French	Olivier Masset-Depasse	Anne Coesens	Drama	Selected as the Belgian entry for the Best Foreign Language Film at the 83rd Academy Awards.
Frits and Freddy (Frits en Freddy)	Dutch	Guy Goossens	Frank Aendenboom	Comedy	
Love-sick (Smoordverliefd)	Dutch	Hilde Van Mieghem	Marie Vinck	Romantic comedy	
Crazy about A. (Zot van A.)	Dutch	Jan Verheyen	Veerle Baetens, Matteo Simoni, Axel Daeseleire, Mathijs Scheepers	Romantic comedy	Remake of Love Is All
Mega Mindy and the Black Christal (Mega Mindy en het Zwarte Kristal)	Dutch	Matthias Temmermans	Free Souffriau	Family	
Sammy's Adventures: The Secret Passage	English	Ben Stassen	Tim Curry, Melanie Griffith, Jenny McCarthy, Kathy Griffin, Stacy Keach, Ed Begley, Jr.	Animation	Digital 3D film

== 2011 ==
English title (original title)	Original language	Director	Cast	Genre	Notes
Schellebelle 1919	Dutch	Johan Heldenbergh, Kenneth Taylor	Ester Cattoir	Historical drama	
Pulsar	Dutch	Alex Stockman	Matthias Schoenaerts	Thriller	
Code 37	Dutch	Jacob Verbruggen	Veerle Baetens, Michaël Pas, Marc Lauwrys, Gilles De Schryver	Crime	
Bullhead (Rundskop)	Dutch	Michaël R. Roskam	Matthias Schoenaerts, Jeroen Perceval, David Murgia	Crime	Partly based on true events: the murder of Karel Van Noppen.
Germaine (Groenten uit Balen)	Dutch	Frank Van Mechelen	Evelien Bosmans, Stany Crets, Lucas Van Den Eynde	Drama	
Northsea, Texas (Noordzee, Texas)	Dutch	Bavo Defurne	Luk Wyns	Drama	
The Kid with a Bike (Le Gamin au Vélo)	French	Jean-Pierre Dardenne, Luc Dardenne	Jérémie Renier, Cécile de France	Drama	
Swooni	Dutch, French	Kaat Beels	Geert Van Rampelberg	Drama	
The Invader (L'Envahisseur)	French	Nicolas Provost	Isaka Sawadogo	Drama	
Lena	Dutch, Polish	Christophe Van Rompaey	Emma Levie, Niels Gomperts	Drama	
Come as You Are (Hasta la vista)	Dutch	Geoffrey Enthoven	Gilles De Schryver, Robrecht Vanden Thoren, Tom Audenaert	Comedy drama	
Madonna's Pig (Het Varken van Madonna)	Dutch	Frank Van Passel	Kevin Janssens	Comedy	

== 2012 ==
English title (original title)	Original language	Director	Cast	Genre	Notes
Beyond the Walls (Hors les murs)	French	David Lambert	Guillaume Gouix, Matila Malliarakis, Mélissa Désormeaux-Poulin, David Salles, Flonja Kodheli	Drama	Belgium-Canada-France coproduction
The Fifth Season (La Cinquième Saison)	French	Peter Brosens, Jessica Woodworth		Drama	
Time of My Life (Tot Altijd)	Dutch	Nic Balthazar	Koen De Graeve, Geert Van Rampelberg	Drama	Based on true events: legalizing euthanasia by MS patient Mario Verstraete
Offline	Dutch	Peter Monsaert	Wim Willaert, Anemone Valcke	Drama	
Kinshasa Kids	French, Lingala	Marc-Henri Wajnberg	Rachel Mwanza, Papa Wemba	Drama	
Mixed Kebab	Dutch	Guy Lee Thys	Gamze Tazim	Drama	
Our Children (A Perdre la Raison)	French	Joachim Lafosse	Émilie Dequenne, Niels Arestrup, Tahar Rahim	Drama	Based on the real-life murders committed by Genevieve Lhermitte
The Broken Circle Breakdown	Dutch	Felix Van Groeningen	Veerle Baetens, Johan Heldenbergh	Melodrama	Winner of 2013 Lux Prize. Nominated Best Foreign Language Film at the 86th Academy Awards
Sammy's Adventures: Escape from Paradise	English	Ben Stassen	Kaitlyn Maher	Animation	Digital 3D film
The Sound of Belgium	Dutch, French	Jozef Deville	John Flanders	Documentary	

== 2013 ==
English title (original title)	Original language	Director	Cast	Genre	Notes
The Fifth Estate	English	Bill Condon	Benedict Cumberbatch, Daniel Brühl	Biopic, Thriller	Distributed by DreamWorks Pictures/Touchstone Pictures/Entertainment One and produced by Participant Media; a British-Belgian-American co-production
Marina	Dutch, Italian	Stijn Coninx	Matteo Simoni, Evelien Bosmans	Biopic	Based upon the life of Belgo-Italian singer Rocco Granata
The Last Inquisitors	English	Guy Bleyaert	Guy Bleyaert	Action	
Vijay and I	English	Sam Garbarski	Moritz Bleibtreu, Patricia Arquette	Comedy	
The Verdict (Het Vonnis)	Dutch	Jan Verheyen	Koen De Bouw, Joke Devynck, Veerle Baetens, Johan Leysen	Crime	
Crimi Clowns: The Movie (Crimi Clowns: De Movie)	Dutch	Luk Wyns	Luk Wyns, Manou Kersting, Johnny de Mol	Crime	
Kid	Dutch	Fien Troch	Bent Simons	Drama	
Champions F.C.	Dutch	Eric Wirix	Marijn Devalck	Comedy	
Frits & Franky	Dutch	Marc Punt	Peter Van Den Begin, Sven De Ridder	Comedy	
Los Flamencos	Dutch	Daniel Lambo	Peter Van den Eede, Herwig Ilegems, Mark Verstraete	Comedy	
Bingo	Dutch	Rudi Van Den Bossche	Ruud De Ridder, Sven De Ridder	Comedy	
Piet Piraat and the Sea Monster	Dutch	Bart Van Leemputten	Peter Van De Velde	Family	

== 2014 ==
English title (original title)	Original language	Director	Cast	Genre	Notes
All Yours (Je suis à toi)	French	David Lambert	Nahuel Pérez Biscayart, Jean-Michel Balthazar, Monia Chokri	Drama	Belgian-Canadian coproduction
Alleluia	French	Fabrice du Welz	Lola Duenaz, Helena Noguerra, Laurent Lucas	Horror	
Bowling Balls	Dutch	Marc Punt	Filip Peeters, Wim Opbrouck, Peter Van Den Begin, Sven De Ridder, Manou Kersting	Action comedy	
Cub (Welp)	Dutch, French	Jonas Govaerts	Maurice Luijten, Stef Aerts, Evelien Bosmans, Titus De Voogdt	Horror (Slasher)	
Flying Home	Dutch, English	Dominique Deruddere	Jamie Dornan, Jan Decleir, Josse De Pauw	Romantic drama	
Image	Dutch, French	Adil El Arbi, Billall Fallah	Nabil Mallat, Laura Verlinden, Gène Bervoets, Geert Van Rampelberg	Thriller	
Labyrinthus	Dutch	Douglas Boswell	Spencer Bogaert, Tine Embrechts	Family	
Marry Me! (Trouw met mij!)	Dutch	Kadir Balci	Dries De Sutter, Sirin Zahed	Comedy	
N - The Madness of Reason	French	Peter Krüger	Michael Lonsdale, Abiba Sawadogo, Hamadoun Kassogue, Vieux Farka Touré	Documentary, Fiction film	Distributed by Wajnbrosse Productions. Produced by Inti Films; a Belgium-Frenc-Germany-Netherlands co-production. Winner of the Ensor Award for Best Film, Best Editing, and Best Music. Winner of the 2014 Jury Award, Cine Migrante International Film Festival, Brasilia.
Plan Bart	Dutch	Roel Mondelaers	Jeroen Perceval, Wouter Hendrickx	Romantic comedy	
The Treatment (De Behandeling)	Dutch	Hans Herbots	Geert Van Rampelberg, Ina Geerts, Johan Van Assche, Laura Verlinden	Thriller	Based on the best-selling novel 'The Treatment' of British fiction author Mo Hayder
Two Days, One Night	French	Jean-Pierre Dardenne, Luc Dardenne	Marion Cotillard	Drama	
W. - Witse: The Movie (W. - Witse: De Film)	Dutch	Frank Van Mechelen	Hubert Damen, Wim Opbrouck, Mathijs Scheepers	Crime	Following the TV-series Witse
Waste Land	French, Dutch	Pieter Van Hees	Jérémie Renier, Natali Broods, Peter Van Den Begin	Thriller	

== 2015 ==
English title (original title)	Original language	Director	Cast	Genre	Notes
The Ardennes (D'Ardennen)	Dutch	Robin Pront	Kevin Janssens, Jeroen Perceval, Veerle Baetens	Thriller	
Black	French, Dutch	Adil El Arbi, Billal Falah	Martha Canga Antonio, Aboubakr Bensaihi	Crime	Based on the novels 'Black' and 'Back' of youth author Dirk Bracke
Sum of Histories (Terug naar Morgen)	Dutch	Lukas Bossuyt	Koen De Graeve, Matteo Simoni, Robrecht Vanden Thoren	Science fiction, Drama	
Fallow (Brak)	Dutch	Laurent Van Lancker	Tibo Vandenborre, Sam Louwyck	Science fiction, Drama	
Problemski Hotel	English, Russian, Arabic	Manu Riche	Tarek Halaby	Drama	Based on the novel 'Problemski Hotel' of author Dimitri Verhulst.
Keeper	French	Guillaume Senez	Galatea Bellugi, Kacey Mottet Klein, Sam Louwyck	Drama	Co-production with Switzerland and France
Galloping Mind	Dutch	Wim Vandekeybus	Natali Broods	Drama	
Paradise Trips	Dutch	Raf Reyntjens	Gène Bervoets	Comedy drama	
Lee & Cindy C.	Dutch	Stany Crets	Bert Verbeke, Ann Van den Broeck	Comedy drama	
The Brand New Testament (Le Tout Nouveau Testament)	French	Jaco Van Dormael	Benoît Poelvoorde, Yolande Moreau	Comedy	
Safety First: The Movie	Dutch	Jevon Lambrechts, Tim Van Aelst	Matteo Simoni, Bruno Vanden Broecke, Ben Segers, Ruth Beeckmans	Comedy	Following the TV-series Safety First (series)
Champions F.C. 2: Jubilée Générale (F.C. De Kampioenen 2: Jubilée Générale)	Dutch	Jan Verheyen	Marijn Devalck	Comedy	2nd film following the TV-series Champions F.C.
What Men Want (Wat Mannen Willen)	Dutch	Filip Peeters	Tom Audenaert, Ben Segers, Jonas Van Geel, Adriaan Van den Hoof, Louis Talpe, Gène Bervoets	Romantic comedy	Remake of Men in the City
Café Derby	Dutch	Lenny Van Wesemael	Wim Opbrouck	Family	
Mega Mindy versus Rox	Dutch	Matthias Temmermans	Free Souffriau	Family	
Ay Ramon!	Dutch	Stijn Coninx	Jan Decleir, Matteo Simoni, Evelien Bosmans, Pieter Embrechts	Saint Nicholas film	
Cafard	Dutch	Jan Bultheel	Wim Willaert	Animation	Animated war film.
Phantom Boy	French	Jean-Loup Felicioli, Alain Gagnol		Animation	Co-production with France.

== 2016 ==
English title (original title)	Original language	Director	Cast	Genre	Notes
Prime Minister (De Premier)	Dutch, English	Erik Van Looy	Adam Godley, Saskia Reeves, Koen De Bouw, Tine Reymer, Stijn Van Opstal, Charlotte Vandermeersch	Thriller	
Crimi Clowns 2.0: Scum (Crimi Clowns 2.0: Uitschot)	Dutch	Luk Wyns	Luk Wyns, Manou Kersting	Crime	
Brother (Broer)	Dutch, English	Geoffrey Enthoven	Koen De Bouw, Koen De Graeve, Titus De Voogdt, Alison Doody, Udo Kier	Drama	
Belgica	Dutch	Felix Van Groeningen	Stef Aerts, Tom Vermeir, Sam Louwyck, Charlotte Vandermeersch	Drama	
Flemish Heaven (Le Ciel Flamand)	Dutch, French	Peter Monsaert	Sara Vertongen, Wim Willaert	Drama	
Home	Dutch	Fien Troch	Jeroen Perceval, Kevin Janssens, Katelijne Verbeke	Drama	
The Unknown Girl	French	Dardenne brothers	Adèle Haenel, Jérémie Renier	Drama	
A Wedding (Noces)	French, Urdu	Stephan Streker	Lina El Arabi, Sebastien Houbani	Drama	Coproduction with France, Luxembourg, and Pakistan.

== 2017 ==
English title (original title)	Original language	Director	Cast	Genre	Notes
Above the Law (Tueurs)	French	Jean-François Hensgens, François Troukens	Olivier Gourmet, Lubna Azabal, Kevin Janssens, Bouli Lanners, Natacha Régnier, Tibo Vandenborre	Thriller, Crime	
Blind Spot (Dode Hoek)	Dutch, French	Nabil Ben Yadir	Peter Van Den Begin, Jan Decleir, Soufiane Chilah, Ruth Becquart, David Murgia, Jurgen Delnaet	Thriller	
Allemaal Familie	Dutch	Dries Vos	Nathalie Meskens, Bill Barberis	Romantic comedy	
Let the Corpses Tan (Laissez Bronzer les Cadavres)	French	Hélène Cattet and Bruno Forzani	Elina Lowensohn, Stephane Ferrara, Bernie Bonvoisin	Western	

== 2018 ==
English title (original title)	Original language	Director	Cast	Genre	Notes
Gangsta (Patser)	Dutch, Arabic	Adil El Arbi, Bilall Fallah	Matteo Simoni, Nora Gharib, Ali B, Dimitri Thivaios	Crime	
Girl	Dutch, French	Lukas Dhont	Victor Polster, Arieh Worthalter	Drama	
Mothers' Instinct (Duelles)	French	Olivier Masset-Depasse	Veerle Baetens, Anne Coesens, Mehdi Nebbou, Arieh Worthalter	Thriller	
Third Wedding (Troisièmes noces)	French	David Lambert	Bouli Lanners, Rachel Mwanza, Eric Kabongo	Comedy-drama	Belgian-Canadian coproduction

== 2019 ==
English title (original title)	Original language	Director	Cast	Genre	Notes
Torpedo	Dutch, English	Sven Huybrechts	Koen De Bouw, Thure Riefenstein, Ella-June Henrard, Joren Seldeslachts, Sven De Ridder, Bert Haelvoet	War, Action	Partly based on true events.
Yummy	Dutch, English	Lars Damoiseaux	Maaike Neuville, Bart Hollanders, Benjamin Ramon, Clara Cleymans	Comedy horror	
Bastard (Bastaard)	Dutch	Mathieu Mortelmans	Spencer Bogaert, Tine Reymer, Bjarne Devolder, Koen De Bouw	Thriller	
Sympathy for the Devil (Sympathie pour le Diable)	French	Guillaume de Fontenay	Niels Schneider, Vincent Rottiers, Ella Rumpf	War drama	Based on the book of the same name.
Young Ahmed	French, Arabic	Dardenne brothers	Idir Ben Adi, Olivier Bonnaoud, Myriem Akheddiou, Claire Bodson	Drama	
