= List of Belgian films of the 2000s =

A list of films produced in Belgium ordered by year of release. For an alphabetical list of Belgian films see Category:Belgian films

== 2000 ==
English title (original title)	Original language	Director	Cast	Genre	Notes
The Captive (La Captive)	French	Chantal Akerman	Olivia Bonamy, Sylvie Testud	Drama	
Everybody's Famous (Iedereen Beroemd!)	Dutch	Dominique Deruddere	Marc Didden	Comedy drama	Academy Award for Best Foreign Language Film nominee
Family Pack (Que faisaient les femmes pendant que l'homme marchait sur la lune?)	French	Chris Vander Stappen	Marie Bunel, Hélène Vincent, Mimie Mathy, Tsilla Chelton, Macha Grenon, Christian Crahay, Emmanuel Bilodeau	Drama	Belgian, French, Swiss and Canadian coproduction

== 2001 ==
English title (original title)	Original language	Director	Cast	Genre	Notes
No Man's Land	English	Danis Tanović	Branko Đurić, Filip Šovagović	War	Belgian-Bosnia-Herzegovina-Slovenian-Italian-French-British co-production; Academy Award for Best Foreign Language Film winner (representing Bosnia-Herzegovina); Golden Globe Award for Best Foreign Language Film winner (representing Bosnia-Herzegovina); winner of Best Screenplay Award (Cannes Film Festival)
Lijmen/Het been	Dutch	Robbe De Hert	Willeke van Ammelrooy, Sylvia Kristel, Jan Decleir	Crime	Based on the short stories by Willem Elsschot
Olivetti 82	Dutch	Rudi Van Den Bossche	Dirk Roofthooft, Hilde Heijnen, Hans De Munter	Crime	
Haunted Castle	English	Ben Stassen		Animation	IMAX film
Pauline & Paulette	Dutch	Lieven Debrauwer	Ann Petersen, Dora Van Der Groen	Family	Belgian-Dutch-French co-production; Belgium's official entry for the 74th Academy Awards

== 2002 ==
English title (original title)	Original language	Director	Cast	Genre	Notes
Alias	Dutch	Jan Verheyen	Hilde De Baerdemaeker, Geert Hunaerts, Hilde Van Mieghem	Horror (Giallo)	
Le fils (The Son)	French	Jean-Pierre Dardenne, Luc Dardenne	Olivier Gourmet	Social drama	Palme d'Or nominee at Cannes; Belgium's official entry for the 75th Academy Awards

== 2003 ==
English title (original title)	Original language	Director	Cast	Genre	Notes
The Alzheimer Case/The Memory of a Killer (De Zaak Alzheimer)	Dutch	Erik Van Looy	Jan Decleir	Thriller	Belgium's official entry for the 77th Academy Awards; based on the novel by Jef Geeraerts
Cavale (One: On the Run)	French	Lucas Belvaux	Lucas Belvaux, Catherine Frot	Thriller	Belgian-French co-production; part one of Lucas Belvaux' "Trilogy"
Un couple épatant (Two: An Amazing Couple)	French	Lucas Belvaux	Ornella Muti, François Morel	Comedy	Belgian-French co-production; part two of Lucas Belvaux' "Trilogy"
Après la vie (Three: After Life)	French	Lucas Belvaux	Dominique Blanc, Gilbert Melki	Melodrama	Belgian-French co-production; part three of Lucas Belvaux' "Trilogy"
Any Way the Wind Blows	Dutch, English, French	Tom Barman		Ensemble film	
Jeux d'enfants	French	Yann Samuell	Guillaume Canet, Marion Cotillard	Comedy / Drama / Romance	3 wins & 2 nominations
Misadventures in 3D	English	Ben Stassen	Stuart Pankin	Science fiction film	IMAX film; sequel to Encounter in the Third Dimension
Les triplettes de Belleville (The Triplets of Belleville)	French	Sylvain Chomet		Animation	French-Belgian-Canadian co-production; Academy Award for Best Animated Feature nominee
Verder dan de maan (Sea of Silence)	Dutch	Stijn Coninx	Huub Stapel	Drama	Belgian-Danish-Dutch-German co-production; Belgium's official entry for the 76th Academy Awards

== 2004 ==
English title (original title)	Original language	Director	Cast	Genre	Notes
The Ordeal (Calvaire)	French	Fabrice Du Welz	Laurent Lucas	Horror	
Ae Fond Kiss...	English	Ken Loach	Atta Yaqub, Eva Birthistle	Drama	Belgian-British-German-Italian-Spanish co-production
Le cou de la girafe	French	Safy Nebbou	Sandrine Bonnaire, Darry Cowl	Drama	Belgian-French co-production
Steve + Sky	Dutch	Felix Van Groeningen	Titus De Voogdt	Drama	
Sweet Jam (Confituur)	Dutch	Lieven Debrauwer		Comedy drama	Belgian-Swiss co-production

== 2005 ==
English title (original title)	Original language	Director	Cast	Genre	Notes
The Intruder (De Indringer)	Dutch	Frank Van Mechelen	Koen De Bouw, Maaike Neuville, Filip Peeters, Axel Daeseleire	Thriller	Based on true events.
L'Enfant (The Child)	French	Jean-Pierre Dardenne, Luc Dardenne	Olivier Gourmet	Social drama	Palme d'Or winner; Belgium's official entry for the 78th Academy Awards
Free Zone	English	Amos Gitai	Natalie Portman	Drama	Israeli-Belgian-French-Spanish co-production; Palme d'Or nominee
Hell (L'Enfer)		Danis Tanović	Emmanuelle Béart, Marie Gillain, Carole Bouquet	Drama	Belgian-French-Italian-Japanese co-production; the second of the Heaven-Hell-Purgatory trilogy written by Krzysztof Kieslowski
Miss Montigny	French	Miel Van Hoogenbemt	Sophie Quinton, Ariane Ascaride	Drama	Belgium-France-UK-Luxembourg co-production
Someone Else's Happiness (Een Ander Zijn Geluk)	Dutch	Fien Troch	Johanna ter Steege, Josse De Pauw, Jan Decleir	Drama	Belgian-Dutch co-production; Belgium's official entry for the 79th Academy Awards
The Ax (Le Couperet)	French	Costa-Gavras	José Garcia, Olivier Gourmet	Comedy	Belgian-French-Spanish co-production.
The Wedding Party	German	Dominique Deruddere	Armin Rohde, Uwe Ochsenknecht	Thriller	German‐Belgian co‐production
Winky's Horse (Het paard van Sinterklaas)	Dutch	Mischa Kamp	Jan Decleir	Children's film	Belgian-Dutch co-production.
El abrazo de la tierra	Spanish	José Luis Peñafuerte		Documentary	Belgian-Spanish co-production.

== 2006 ==
English title (original title)	Original language	Director	Cast	Genre	Notes
The Flemish Vampire	Dutch	R. Kan Albay	Sven De Ridder	Horror	
Stormforce (Windkracht 10: Koksijde Rescue)	Dutch	Hans Herbots	Kevin Janssens, Veerle Baetens, Koen De Bouw, Eric Godon	Action	
The Hell of Tanger (De Hel van Tanger)	Dutch	Frank van Mechelen	Filip Peeters, Axel Daeseleire	Drama	Based on true events: the arrest of bus drivers Pierre Stukken and Jan Dierick in Tanger, Morocco
Dennis Van Rita (Love Belongs to Everyone)	Dutch	Hilde Van Mieghem	Els Dottermans, Matthias Schoenaerts	Drama	
Kruistocht in Spijkerbroek (Crusade in Jeans)	Dutch	Ben Sombogaart	Emily Watson, Jan Decleir, Josse De Pauw	Adventure	Belgian-Dutch-German co-production; based on the novel by Thea Beckman
La Raison du plus faible	French	Lucas Belvaux			Entered into the 2006 Cannes Film Festival
Mr. Average	French	Pierre-Paul Renders			Entered into the 28th Moscow International Film Festival
Perfume: The Story of a Murderer	English	Tom Tykwer	Ben Whishaw, Alan Rickman, Rachel Hurd-Wood, Dustin Hoffman	Period psychological thriller	German-French-Spanish-American-Belgian co-production
Sounds of Sand	French	Marion Hänsel		Drama	Belgian-French co-production
Azur et Asmar	French	Michel Ocelot		Animation	Belgian-French-Italian-Spanish co-production

== 2007 ==
English title (original title)	Original language	Director	Cast	Genre	Notes
Missing Persons Unit (Vermist)	Dutch	Jan Verheyen	Koen De Bouw, Kevin Janssens, Joke Devynck, Filip Peeters	Crime	
Ben X	Dutch	Nic Balthazar		Drama	Belgium's official entry for the 80th Academy Awards; based on the novel by Nic Balthazar
Ex Drummer	Dutch	Koen Mortier		Drama	Based on the novel by Herman Brusselmans
Dagen zonder Lief	Dutch	Felix Van Groeningen			
Where Is Winky's Horse? (Waar is het paard van Sinterklaas?)	Dutch	Mischa Kamp	Jan Decleir	Children's film	Belgian-Dutch co-production.
Man Zkt Vrouw (A Perfect Match)	Dutch	Miel Van Hoogenbemt	Jan Decleir	Comedy	

== 2008 ==
English title (original title)	Original language	Director	Cast	Genre	Notes
Vinyan	English	Fabrice Du Welz	Rufus Sewell, Emmanuelle Béart, Julie Dreyfus	Horror	Belgian-British-French co-production
Left Bank (Linkeroever)	Dutch	Pieter Van Hees	Matthias Schoenaerts, Eline Kuppens, Sien Eggers, Tom Dewispelaere	Horror	
Largo Winch	English	Jérôme Salle	Tomer Sisley, Mélanie Thierry, Bojana Panić, Karel Roden, Kristin Scott Thomas, Miki Manojlovic	Thriller	Belgian-French co-production; based on the comic book series by Philippe Francq and Jean Van Hamme
Loft	Dutch	Erik Van Looy	Matthias Schoenaerts, Koen De Bouw, Filip Peeters, Koen De Graeve, Bruno Vanden Broecke, Jan Decleir	Thriller	
JCVD	French	Mabrouk El Mechri	Jean-Claude Van Damme	Crime	Belgian-French-Luxembourgian co-production
Aanrijding in Moscou (Moscow, Belgium)	Dutch	Christophe Van Rompaey	Barbara Sarafian	Romantic comedy	
Eldorado	French	Bouli Lanners	Bouli Lanners, Philippe Nahon	Road movie	Belgian-French co-production; Belgium's official entry for the 81st Academy Awards
Fly Me to the Moon	English	Ben Stassen	Nicollette Sheridan, Tim Curry, Christopher Lloyd, Robert Patrick, Kelly Ripa, Adrienne Barbeau, Ed Begley, Jr., Buzz Aldrin	Animation	First Belgian feature-length CGI-animated film; Europe's first digital 3D film; only picture to date to receive an exclusively digital 3D release in the U.S.; also released as an IMAX film
Max & Co		Samuel Guillaume, Frédéric Guillaume		Animated film	Stop-motion animated; Belgian-British-French-Swiss co-production
Le silence de Lorna (Lorna's Silence)	French	Jean-Pierre Dardenne, Luc Dardenne	Arta Dobroshi	Social drama	Belgian-British-French co-production; Palme d'Or nominee; winner of Best Screenplay Award (Cannes Film Festival)

== 2009 ==
English title (original title)	Original language	Director	Cast	Genre	Notes
Dossier K.	Dutch	Jan Verheyen	Koen De Bouw, Werner De Smedt, R. Kan Albay, Blerim Destani	Thriller	Based on the novel by Jef Geeraerts
Amer	French	Hélène Cattet, Bruno Forzani			
The Misfortunates (De Helaasheid der Dingen)	Dutch	Felix Van Groeningen	Koen De Graeve, Johan Heldenbergh, Bert Haelvoet	Social drama	Belgium's official entry for the 82nd Academy Awards; based on the novel by Dimitri Verhulst
Reiki	English	Pedro Chaves	Martin Swabey, Cela Yildiz	Fantasy action	
Mr. Nobody	English	Jaco Van Dormael	Jared Leto, Sarah Polley, Diane Kruger, Linh Dan Pham	Science fiction	Belgian-Canadian-French-German co-production; most expensive Belgian film to date; Golden Lion nominee; winner of Golden Osella
A Town Called Panic (Panique au Village)	French	Stéphane Aubier, Vincent Patar		Animated film	Stop-motion animated; Belgian-French-Luxembourgian co-production
The Secret of Kells	English	Tomm Moore		Animation	Belgian-French-Irish co-production; nominated for the Academy Award for Best Animated Feature
Soeur Sourire	French, Dutch	Stijn Coninx	Cécile De France, Sandrine Blancke, Jan Decleir	Biopic	Belgian-French co-production; based on the life of Jeanine Deckers aka The Singing Nun
Suske en Wiske: De Texas-Rakkers (Luke and Lucy: The Texas Rangers)	Dutch	Mark Mertens, Wim Bien		Animation	Belgian-Dutch-Luxembourgian co-production; most expensive Flemish film to date; based on the comic book series by Willy Vandersteen
