= 26th European Film Awards =

2013 film awards ceremony in Germany

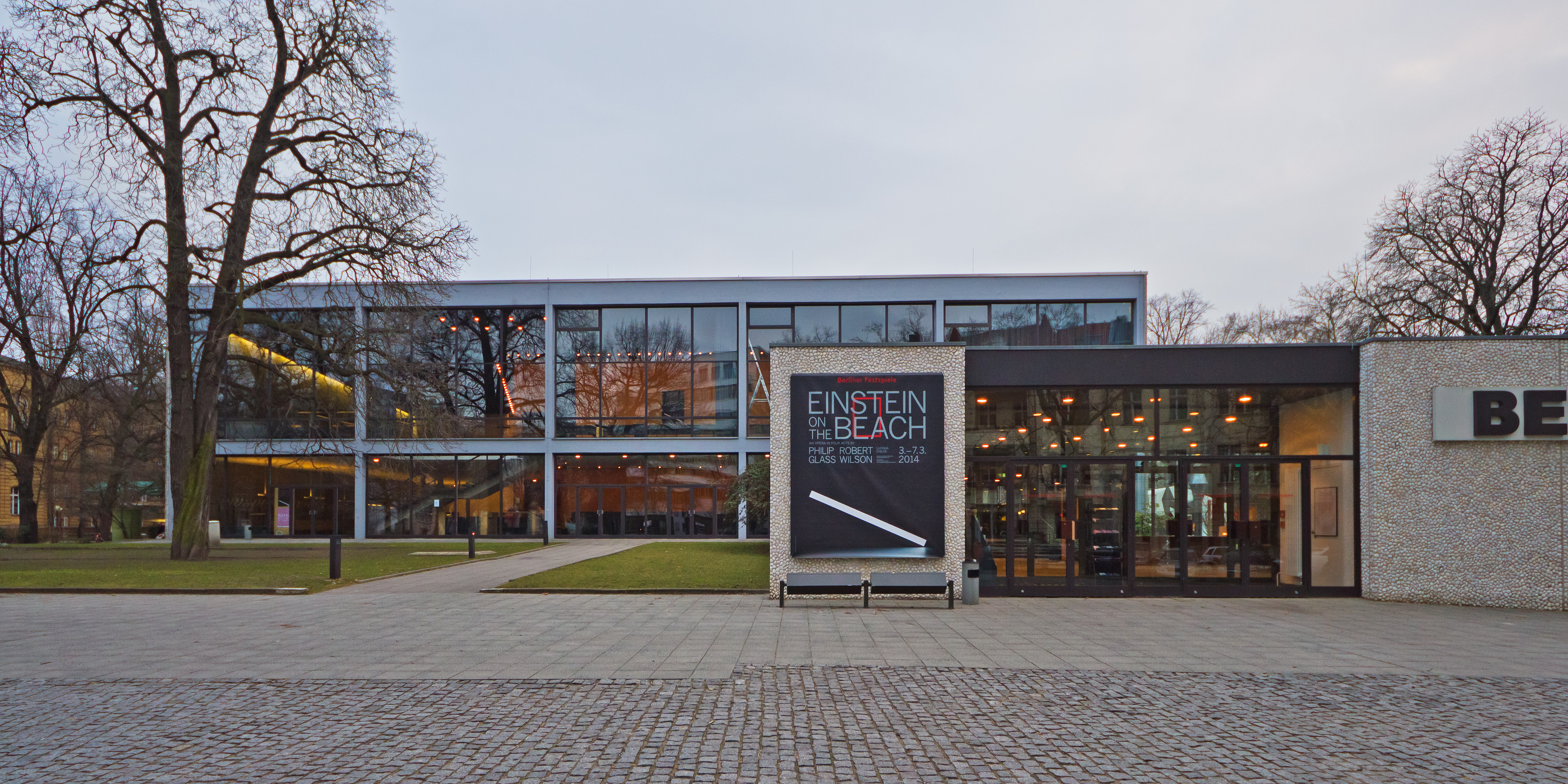
- Haus der Berliner Festspiele
- Date: 7 December 2013
- Site: Haus der Berliner Festspiele, Berlin
- Hosted by: Anke Engelke
- Produced by: Marion Döring and Jürgen Biesinger
- Organized by: European Film Academy

Television coverage
- Channel: Arte, HBO Europe, NTV Plus Kino+, ETV2, ORF III, SBS Two, OTE Cinema 1HD, TV3

The 26th European Film Awards were presented on 7 December 2013 in Berlin, Germany. The winners were selected by over 2,500 members of the European Film Academy. On 28 October 2013, a special seven-member jury convened in Berlin and, based on the EFA Selection list, decided on the winners in the categories cinematography, editing, production design, costume design, composer and sound design. On 4 November 2013, nominations for documentary were announced. The special documentary jury consist five members: Antonio Saura Despina Mouzaki, Claas Danielsen, Ally Derks and Jacques Laurent.

== Winners and nominees ==
=== Best Film ===
English title	Original title	Director(s)	Production country
The Great Beauty	La grande bellezza	Paolo Sorrentino	(Italy) (France)
Blue Is the Warmest Colour	La Vie d'Adèle – Chapitres 1 & 2	Abdellatif Kechiche	(France)
The Best Offer	La migliore offerta	Giuseppe Tornatore	(Italy)
Blancanieves		Pablo Berger	(Spain) (France)
The Broken Circle Breakdown		Felix Van Groeningen	(Belgium)
A Coffee in Berlin	Oh Boy!	Jan Ole Gerster	(Germany)

=== People’s Choice Award ===
English title	Original title	Director(s)	Writers(s)	Producer(s)	Production country
The Gilded Cage	La Cage dorée	Ruben Alves	Ruben Alves, Jean-André Yerlès, Hugo Gélin		(Portugal) (France)
Anna Karenina		Joe Wright	Tom Stoppard		(United Kingdom)
The Best Offer	La migliore offerta	Giuseppe Tornatore	Giuseppe Tornatore		(Italy)
The Broken Circle Breakdown		Felix Van Groeningen	Carl Joos, Felix Van Groeningen		(Belgium)
A Coffee in Berlin	Oh Boy!	Jan Ole Gerster	Jan Ole Gerster		(Germany)
The Deep	Djúpið	Baltasar Kormákur	Jón Atli Jónasson, Baltasar Kormákur		(Iceland)
I'm So Excited	Los amantes pasajeros	Pedro Almodóvar	Pedro Almodóvar		(Spain)
The Impossible	Lo Imposible	J.A. Bayona	Sergio G. Sánchez, María Belón		(Spain)
Kon-Tiki		Joachim Rønning, Espen Sandberg	Petter Skavlan		(Norway) (Denmark) (Germany) (United Kingdom) (Sweden)
Love Is All You Need	Den skaldede frisør	Susanne Bier	Anders Thomas Jensen, Susanne Bier		(Denmark)
Searching for Sugar Man		Malik Bendjelloul			(Sweden) (United Kingdom)

=== Discovery of the Year ===
English title	Original title	Director(s)	Writers(s)	Producer(s)	Production country
A Coffee in Berlin	Oh Boy!	Jan Ole Gerster		Marcos Kantis, Alexander Wadouh	(Germany)
Eat Sleep Die	Äta sova dö	Gabriela Pichler		China Åhlander	(Sweden)
Call Girl		Mikael Marcimain		Mimmi Spång	(Sweden) (Norway) (Republic of Ireland) (Finland)
Miele		Valeria Golino		Riccardo Scamarcio, Viola Prestieri, Anne-Dominique Toussaint, Raphaël Berdugo	(Italy) (France)
The Plague	La Plaga	Neus Ballús		Pau Subirós	(Spain)

=== Best Comedy ===
English title	Original title	Director(s)	Production country
Love Is All You Need	Den skaldede frisør	Susanne Bier	(Denmark)
I'm So Excited	Los amantes pasajeros	Pedro Almodóvar	(Spain)
The Priest's Children	Svećenikova djeca	Vinko Brešan	(Croatia)
Welcome Mr. President!	Benvenuto Presidente!	Riccardo Milani	(Italy)

=== Best Director ===
Director(s)	Nationality	English title	Original title
Paolo Sorrentino	Italy	The Great Beauty	La grande bellezza
Giuseppe Tornatore	Italy	The Best Offer	La migliore offerta
Pablo Berger	Spain	Blancanieves	
Abdellatif Kechiche	France	Blue Is the Warmest Colour	La Vie d'Adèle – Chapitres 1 & 2
François Ozon	France	In the House	Dans la maison
Felix Van Groeningen	Belgium	The Broken Circle Breakdown	

=== Best Actor ===
Actor	Nationality	English title	Original title
Toni Servillo	Italy	The Great Beauty	La grande bellezza
Johan Heldenbergh	Belgium	The Broken Circle Breakdown	
Jude Law	Great Britain	Anna Karenina	
Fabrice Luchini	France	In the House	Dans la maison
Tom Schilling	Germany	A Coffee in Berlin	Oh Boy!

=== Best Actress ===
Actress	Nationality	English title	Original title
Veerle Baetens	Belgium	The Broken Circle Breakdown	
Luminița Gheorghiu	Romania	Child's Pose	Poziția copilului
Keira Knightley	Great Britain	Anna Karenina	
Barbara Sukowa	Germany	Hannah Arendt	
Naomi Watts	Australia and Great Britain	The Impossible	Lo Imposible

=== Best Composer ===
English title	Original title	Winner(s)	Nationality
The Best Offer	La migliore offerta	Ennio Morricone	(Italy)

=== Best Screenwriter ===
Screenwriter(s)	Nationality	English title	Original title
François Ozon	France	In the House	Dans la maison
Paolo Sorrentino, Umberto Contarello	Italy	The Great Beauty	La grande bellezza
Tom Stoppard	Great Britain	Anna Karenina	
Giuseppe Tornatore	Italy	The Best Offer	La migliore offerta
Felix Van Groeningen, Carl Joos	Belgium	The Broken Circle Breakdown	

=== Best Cinematographer ===
English title	Original title	Winner(s)	Nationality
Fill the Void	למלא את החלל	Asaf Sudry	(Israel)

=== Best Production Designer ===
English title	Original title	Winner(s)	Nationality
Anna Karenina		Sarah Greenwood	(United Kingdom)

=== Best Co-Production ===
Winner(s)	Nationality
Ada Solomon	(Romania)

=== Best Costume Designer ===
English title	Original title	Winner(s)	Nationality
Blancanieves		Paco Delgado	(Spain)

=== Best Editor ===
English title	Original title	Winner(s)	Nationality
The Great Beauty	La grande bellezza	Cristiano Travaglioli	(Italy)

=== Best Sound Designer ===
English title	Original title	Winner(s)	Nationality
Paradise: Faith	Paradies: Glaube	Matz Müller i Erik Mischijew	(Germany)

=== Best Animated Feature Film ===
English title	Original title	Director(s)	Writers(s)	Animation	Production country
The Congress		Ari Folman	Ari Folman	Yoni Goodman	(Israel) (Germany) (Poland) (Luxembourg) (France) (Belgium)
Jasmine		Alain Ughetto	Alain Ughetto, Jacques Reboud, Chloé Inguenaud	Alain Ughetto	(France)
Pinocchio		Enzo d' AIò	Enzo d' AIò, Umberto Marino	Marco Zanoni	(Italy) (Luxembourg) (France) (Belgium)

=== European Achievement in World Cinema ===
Recipient	Occupation	Nationality
Pedro Almodóvar	Director	(Spain)

=== Lifetime Achievement Award ===
Recipient	Occupation	Nationality
Catherine Deneuve	Actress	(France)

=== Best Documentary ===
English title	Original title	Director(s)	Writers(s)	Producer(s)	Production country
The Act of Killing	Jagal	Joshua Oppenheimer		Signe Byrge Sørensen	(Denmark) (Norway) (United Kingdom)
Stop-Over	L'escale	Kaveh Bakhtiari	Kaveh Bakhtiari	Elisa Garbar, Heinz Dill, Olivier Charvet, Sophie Germain	(Switzerland) (France)
The Missing Picture	L'image manquante	Rithy Panh	Rithy Panh	Catherine Dussart	(France) (Cambodia)

=== Best Short Film ===
Film	Director(s)	Country	Nominating Festival
Death of a Shadow	Tom Van Avermaet	(Belgium) (France)	Valladolid Short Film Nominee
Cut	Christoph Girardet, Matthias Müller	(Germany)	Vila do Conde Short Film Nominee
Butter Lamp	Hu Wei	(France) (China)	Drama Short Film Nominee
Houses with small windows	Bülent Öztürk	(Belgium)	Venice Short Film Nominee
Letter	Sergei Loznitsa	(Russia)	Kraków Short Film Nominee
Mistery	Chema García Ibarra	(Spain)	Berlin Short Film Nominee
Morning	Cathy Brady	(United Kingdom)	Cork Short Film Nominee
The Waves	Miguel Fonseca	(Portugal)	Ghent Short Film Nominee
Orbit Ever After	Jamie Stone	(United Kingdom)	Bristol Short Film Nominee
Jump	Petar Valchanov, Kristina Grozeva	(Bulgaria)	Clermont-Ferrand Short Film Nominee
Sunday 3	Jochen Kuhn	(Germany)	Tampere Short Film Nominee
A Story For The Modlins	Sergio Oksman	(Spain)	Sarajevo Short Film Nominee
Though I Know the River is Dry	Omar Robert Hamilton	(Egypt) (Palestine) (United Kingdom)	Rotterdam Short Film Nominee
Nuclear Waste	Myroslav Slaboshpytskiy	(Ukraine)	Grimstad Short Film Nominee
Zima	Cristina Picchi	(Russia)	Locarno Short Film Nominee

=== Young Audience Award ===
English title	Original title	Director(s)	Writers(s)	Producer(s)	Production country
The Zigzag Kid	Nono, het Zigzag Kind	Vincent Bal	Vincent Bal, Jon Gilbert	Burny Bos, Els Vandevorst	(Netherlands)
The Suicide Shop	Le Magasin des suicides	Patrice Leconte	Patrice Leconte	Gilles Podesta	(France) (Belgium) (Canada)
Upside Down	Kopfüber	Bernd Sahling	Bernd Sahling, Anja Tuckermann	Jörg Rothe	(Germany)
