= Manaki Brothers Film Festival =

Annual international film festival in North Macedonia

Manaki Film Festival
- Location: Bitola, North Macedonia
- Founded: 1979
- Awards: Camera 300
- Language: International
- Website: manaki.com.mk

The International Cinematographers Film Festival "Manaki Brothers" (Macedonian: Меѓународен фестивал на филмската камера „Браќа Манаки“), known short as Manaki Film Festival is an annual international film festival organized by the Macedonian Film Professionals Association (MFPA). The festival is held in Bitola, the town where most of the activities of the Aromanian brothers Yanaki and Milton Manaki were organized. They were the filmmakers, who in 1905 filmed in Avdela the first motion pictures in the Ottoman Balkans. Each year the festival is supported by the Ministry of Culture of Macedonia and the President of North Macedonia. The award of the festival is Camera 300 that given to the year's best motion pictures chosen by the festival's film committee. The Manaki Film Festival has been hosted at the Center of culture, with screenings at the Big Hall, located in the center of Bitola and has been attended by celebrities such as Michael York, Charles Dance, Victoria Abril, Daryl Hannah, Catherine Deneuve, Isabelle Huppert, Julliette Binoche, Aleksei Serebryakov, Bruno Ganz, Claudia Cardinale, Fatih Akin.

== Golden Camera 300 for life achievement ==
- 1996 Milton Manaki (posthumously)
- 1997 Ljube Petkovski and Branko Mihajlovski
- 1998 Sven Nykvist
- 1999 Jerzy Wojcik
- 2000 Freddie Francis
- 2001 Miroslav Ondříček and Henri Alekan
- 2002 Tonino Delli Colli
- 2003 Raoul Coutard
- 2004 Vadim Yusov
- 2005 Vittorio Storaro
- 2006 Michael Ballhaus
- 2007 Anatoli Petritsky
- 2008 Walter Carvalho
- 2009 Billy Williams and Peter Suschitzky
- 2010 Vilmos Zsigmond
- 2011 Dante Spinotti
- 2012 Luciano Tovoli
- 2013 José Luis Alcaine
- 2014 Chris Menges
- 2015 Božidar Nikolić, Jaromír Šofr, Ryszard Lenczewski
- 2016 Robby Müller, John Seale
- 2017 Giuseppe Rotunno and Pierre Lhomme
- 2018 Roger Deakins and Claudia Cardinale
- 2019 Edward Lachman and Giorgos Arvanitis
- 2020 Janusz Kamiński
- 2021 Christian Berger
- 2022 Anthony Dod Mantle
- 2023 Peter Biziou
- 2024 Bruno Delbonnel

== Special Golden Camera 300 ==
- 2000 – Jiří Menzel
- 2002 – Robby Müller
- 2003 – Christopher Doyle
- 2006 – Charles Dance
- 2007 – Branko Lustig
- 2008 – Veljko Bulajić and Karen Shakhnazarov
- 2009 – Victoria Abril and Anthony Dod Mantle
- 2010 – Daryl Hannah and Roger Pratt
- 2011 – Bruno Delbonnel and Miki Manojlovic
- 2012 – Christian Berger and Catherine Deneuve
- 2013 – Agnès Godard and Isabelle Huppert
- 2014 – Luca Bigazzi and Juliette Binoche
- 2015 – Aleksei Serebryakov and Bruno Ganz
- 2016 – Phedon Papamichael
- 2017 – Milcho Manchevski
- 2018 – Claudia Cardinale
- 2021 – Andrei Konchalovsky and Jocelyn Pook
- 2022 – John Mathieson
- 2023 – Seamus McGarvey
- 2024 – Jolanta Dylewska

== Golden Camera 300 ==
- 1993 – Vilko Filač for Arizona Dream
- 1994 – Gerard Simon for Louis, the Child King
- 1995 – Stefan Kullänger for Sommaren
- 1996 – Masao Nakabori for Maborosi
- 1997 – Sergey Astakhov for Brother
- 1998 – Walter Carvalho for Central Station
- 1999 – Jacek Petrycki for Journey to the Sun
- 2000 – Andreas Höfer for The Three Lives of Rita
- 2001 – Ryszard Lenczewski for Last Resort
- 2002 – Walter Carvalho for To the Left of the Father
- 2003 – Christopher Doyle for Hero and Barry Ackroyd for Sweet Sixteen
- 2004 – Rainer Klausmann for Head-On
- 2005 – Yang Shu for Peacock
- 2006 – Stéphane Fontaine for The Beat That My Heart Skipped
- 2007 – Dragan Marković for The Living and the Dead and Jaromír Šofr for I Served the King of England
- 2008 – Rodrigo Prieto for Lust, Caution
- 2009 – Natasha Braier for The Milk of Sorrow
- 2010 – Marin Gschlacht for Women Without Men
- 2011 – Fred Kelemen for The Turin Horse
- 2012 – Jolanta Dylewska for In Darkness
- 2013 – Kiko de la Rica for Blancanieves
- 2014 – Valentyn Vasyanovych for The Tribe
- 2015 – Mátyás Erdély for Son of Saul
- 2016 – Jani-Petteri Passi for The Happiest Day in the Life of Olli Mäki
- 2017 – Marcell Rev for Jupiter’s Moon
- 2018 – Hong Kyung-pyo for Burning
- 2019 – Hélène Louvart for The Invisible Life of Eurídice Gusmão
- 2021 – Jani-Petteri Passi for Compartment No. 6
- 2022 – Ruben Impens for The Eight Mountains
- 2023 – Cevahir Şahin and Kürşat Üresin for About Dry Grasses
- 2024 – Judith Kaufmann for The Teachers' Lounge
- 2025 – David Chambille for Nouvelle Vague

== Silver Camera 300 ==
- 2011 – Michael Krichman for Quiet Souls
- 2012 – Alisher Khamidkhadjaev for Living
- 2013 – Virginie Saint-Martin for Tango Libre
- 2014 – Ryszard Lenczewski for Ida
- 2015 – Adam Arkapaw for Macbeth
- 2016 – Ruben Impens for Belgica
- 2017 – Reiner Klausmann for In the Fade
- 2018 – Éric Gautier for Ash Is Purest White
- 2019 – Dong Jinsong for The Wild Goose Lake
- 2021 – Kasper Tuxen for The Worst Person in the World
- 2022 – Daria D'Antonio for The Hand of God
- 2023 – Chengma Zhiyan for Only the River Flows
- 2024 – Ranabir Das for All We Imagine as Light
- 2025 – Olympia Mytilinaiou for Quiet Life

== List of festival directors ==
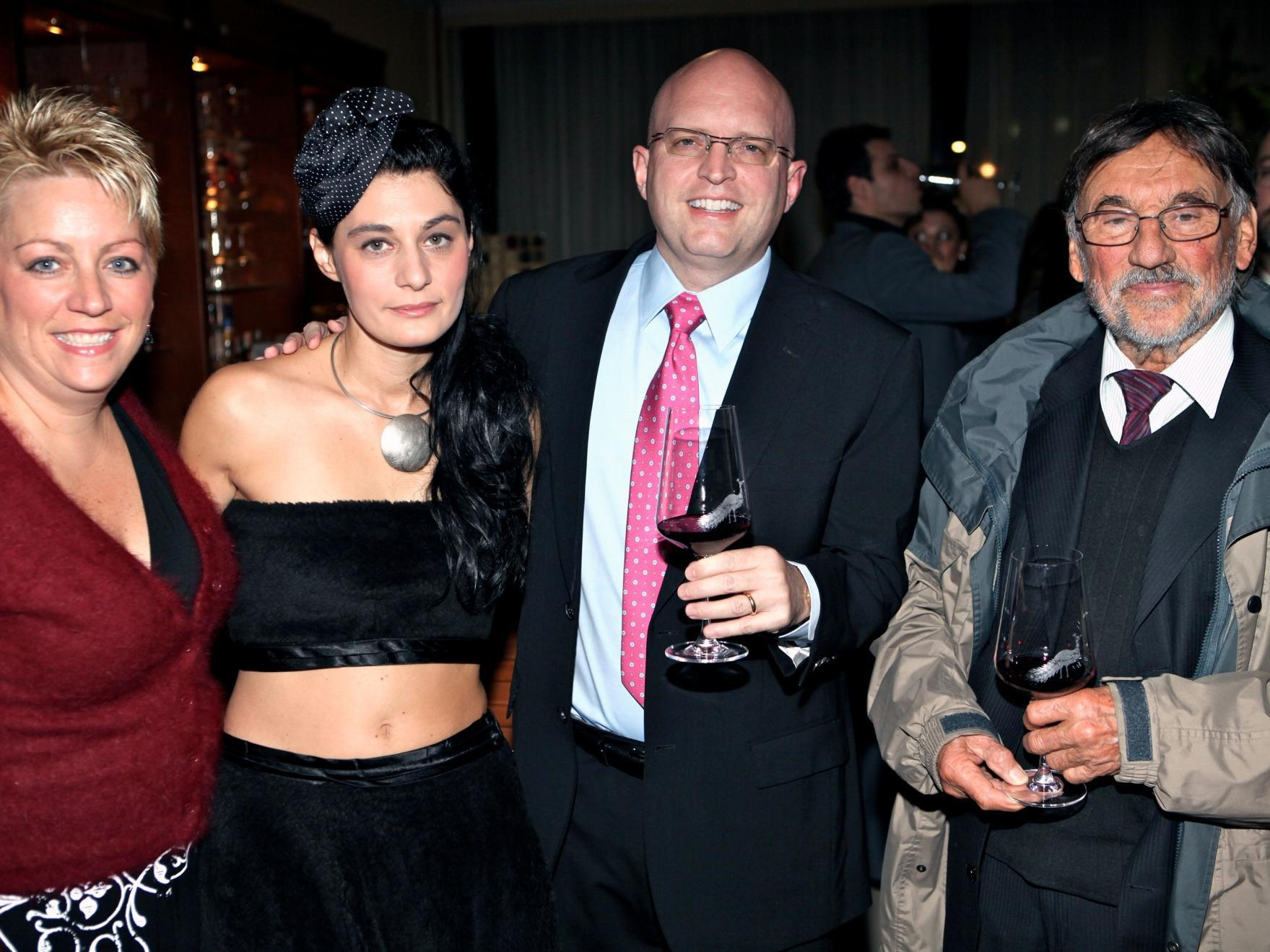
US ambassador in Macedonia, Reeker and Labina Mitevska, director of the festival, Vilmos Zsigmond and Kirstin Wilder at the Manaki Film festival 2010

Before 1993 the festival did not have a director, the function was introduced in 1993.

- Boris Nonevski 1993–1995
- Gorjan Tozija 1995–1995
- Delcho Mihajlov 1996–1998
- Vladimir Atanasov 1998–2001
- Tomi Salkovski 2001–2009
- Labina Mitevska 2009–2014
- Dimitar Nikolov 2015–2015
- Blagoja Kunovski 2016–2018
- Evgenija Teodosievska 2018–2020
- Simeon Damevski 2021–?

== Main competition jury ==
- 1995 – Dick Pope, Ron Holloway, Stole Popov
- 1996 – Marcel Martin
- 1997 – Zivko Zalar, Simon Perry, Deborah Young
- 1998 – Morten Bruus, Sergei Astakhov, Martin Langer
- 2000 – Jaromír Sofr, Jacek Petrycki, John Christian Rosenlund, Jan Hintjens, Ivo Trajkov
- 2001 – Andreas Hoffer, Dominique Bax, Éric Guichard, Aleksandr Bashirov, Dejan Dukovski
- 2002 – Robby Müller, Alain Marcoen, Ronald Bergan, Jan Weincke, Antonio Mitrikeski
- 2003 – Willy Kurant, Olinka Vistica, Gábor Medvigy, António Costa
- 2004 – César Charlone, Rosanna Seregni, Andreas Fischer-Hansen, Roi Jean, Umberto Rossi
- 2009 – Peter Suschitzky, Slobodan Šijan, Yuri Klimenko, Minas Bakalčev
- 2010 – Vilmos Zsigmond, Pawel Pawlinkowski, Dominique Fury, Natasha Braier, Darko Mitrevski, Christine Dollhofer
- 2011 – Dante Spinotti, Eva Zaoralova, Goce Smilevski, Nigel Walters, Martin Schweighofer
- 2012 – Fred Kelemen, Miladin Colakovic, Damjan Kozole, Ilija Penushliski, Virgine Saint Martin
- 2013 – Jose Luis Alcaine, Amnon Zalait, Bojidar Manov, Elma Tataragic, Dejan Dukovski
- 2014 – Giora Bejach, Rebekah Tolley, Srdjan Dragojevic, Simon Tansek, Lazar Sekulovski
- 2015 – Božidar Nikolić, Ryszard Lenczewski, Mitko Panov, Hayet Benkara, Ercan Kesal
- 2016 – Phedon Papamichael, Claire Pijman, Alin Taşçıyan, Gökhan Tiryaki, Vladimir Samoilovski
- 2017 – Paul René Roestad, Luca Coassin, Darijan Pejovski, Jani-Petteri Passi, Erol Zubčević
- 2018 – Olympia Mytilinaiou, Rainer Klausmann, Mattias Troelstrup, Rebecca Fayyad Palud, Gjorce Stavreski
- 2019 – Edward Lachman, Kaloyan Bozhilov, Dominique Welinski, Fejmi Daut, Nenad Dukic
- 2021 – Phillip Bergson, Wim Vanacker, Suki Medencevic, Sonja Prosenc, Dimo Popov
- 2022 – Jean-Marie Dreujou, Melisa Sözen, Carlos R. Diazmuñoz, Maja Bogojević, Samir Ljuma
- 2023 – Daria D’Antonio, Peter Biziou, Teona Strugar Mitevska, Romain Lacourbas, Domenico La Porta
- 2024 – John Seale, Agnès Godard, Cevahir Şahin, Birgit Guðjónsdóttir, Vladimir Blazevski

== World, regional and national film premiers ==
- 2004: "The Great Water" (Големата вода) – National Premiere
- 2005: "Contact" (Контакт) – World Premiere
- 2006: "The Secret Book" (Тајната книга) – World Premiere
- 2010: "Mothers" (Мајки) – National premiere
- 2012: "The Third Half" (Трето полувреме) – World Premiere
- 2012: "Balkan Is Not Dead" (Балканот не е мртов) – World Premiere
- 2013: "The Piano Room" (Соба со пијано) – World Premiere
- 2014: "To the Hilt" (До балчак) – World Premiere
- 2014: "Children of the Sun" (Деца на сонцето) – World Premiere
- 2015: "Lazar" (Лазар) – World Premiere
- 2016: "The Liberation of Skopje" (Ослободувањето на Скопје) – National Premiere
- 2016: "Golden five" (Златна Петорка) – World Premiere
- 2021: "Sisterhood" (Сестри) – National Premiere
- 2022: "Snow White Dies at the End (Снежана на крајот умира) – National Premiere
- 2023: "Housekeeping for beginners" (Домаќинство за почетници) – National Premiere
- 2023: "Lena and Vladimir" (Лена и Владимир) – World Premiere

== Gallery ==
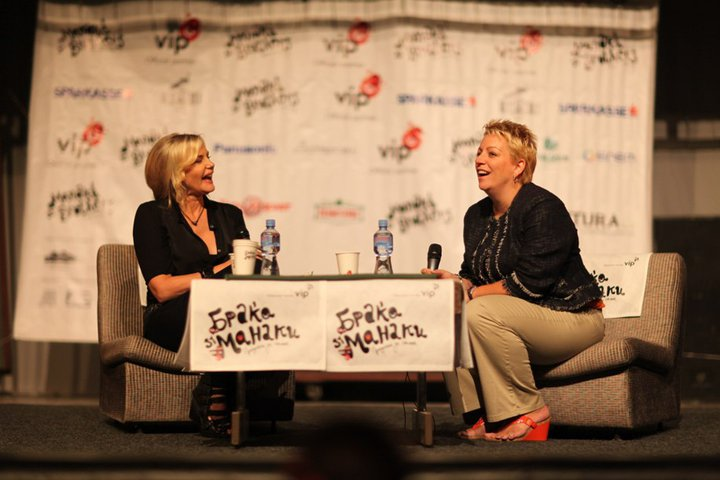
Daryl Hannah, exclusive guest of Manaki in 2010
