= Magritte Award for Best Flemish Film =

Belgian film award

- Country: Belgium
- Presented by: Académie André Delvaux
- First award: 2012
- Currently held by: Julian (2025)
- Website: lesmagritteducinema.com

The Magritte Award for Best Flemish Film (French: Magritte du meilleur film flamand) is an award presented annually by the Académie André Delvaux. It is one of the Magritte Awards, which were established to recognize excellence in Belgian cinematic achievements.

The category's original name was Best Flemish Film in Coproduction, but was changed to its current name in 2015 for the 5th Magritte Awards. It was first awarded in 2012, when Best Film in Coproduction was split in Best Foreign Film in Coproduction and Best Flemish Film in Coproduction. As of the 2024 ceremony, When It Melts is the most recent winner.

== Winners and nominees ==
In the list below, winners are listed first in the colored row, followed by the other nominees.

=== 2010s ===
Year	English title	Original title	Director(s)
2011 (2nd)	Bullhead	Rundskop	Michaël R. Roskam
2011 (2nd)	22nd of May	22 mei	Koen Mortier
2011 (2nd)	Come as You Are	Hasta la Vista	Geoffrey Enthoven
2011 (2nd)	Madly in Love	Smoorverliefd	Hilde Van Mieghem
2011 (2nd)	Pulsar		Alex Stockman
2012 (3rd)	Time of My Life	Tot altijd	Nic Balthazar
2012 (3rd)	Little Black Spiders		Patrice Toye
2012 (3rd)	Madonna's Pig	Het varken van Madonna	Frank Van Passel
2013 (4th)	Kid		Fien Troch
2013 (4th)	Brasserie Romantiek		Joël Vanhoebrouck
2013 (4th)	The Fifth Season	La Cinquième Saison	Peter Brosens and Jessica Woodworth
2014 (5th)	Marina		Stijn Coninx
2014 (5th)	I'm the Same, I'm an Other		Caroline Strubbe
2014 (5th)	Labyrinthus		Douglas Boswell
2014 (5th)	Welcome Home		Tom Heene
2015 (6th)	The Ardennes	D'Ardennen	Robin Pront
2015 (6th)	Belgian Rhapsody	Brabançonne	Vincent Bal
2015 (6th)	Cafard		Jan Bultheel
2015 (6th)	Waste Land		Pieter Van Hees
2016 (7th)	Belgica		Felix Van Groeningen
2016 (7th)	Black		Adil El Arbi and Bilall Fallah
2016 (7th)	The Land of the Enlightened		Pieter-Jan De Pue
2016 (7th)	Problemski Hotel		Manu Riche
2017 (8th)	Home		Fien Troch
2017 (8th)	Cargo		Gilles Coulier
2017 (8th)	King of the Belgians		Peter Brosens and Jessica Woodworth
2017 (8th)	Racer and the Jailbird	Le Fidèle	Michaël R. Roskam
2018 (9th)	Girl		Lukas Dhont
2018 (9th)	Angel	Un Ange	Koen Mortier
2018 (9th)	Don't Shoot	Niet Schieten	Stijn Coninx
2018 (9th)	Gangsta	Patser	Adil El Arbi and Bilall Fallah
2019 (10th)	Patrick	De Patrick	Tim Mielants
2019 (10th)	Bastaard		Mathieu Mortelmans
2019 (10th)	Binti		Frederike Migom
2019 (10th)	Cleo		Eva Cools

=== 2020s ===
Year	English title	Original title	Director(s)
2020/21 (11th)	La Civil		Teodora Mihai
2020/21 (11th)	The Barefoot Emperor		Jessica Woodworth and Peter Brosens
2020/21 (11th)	Dealer		Jeroen Perceval
2020/21 (11th)	Rookie		Lieven Van Baelen
2022 (12th)	Close		Lukas Dhont
2022 (12th)	The Eight Mountains	Le otto montagne	Felix van Groeningen and Charlotte Vandermeersch
2022 (12th)	Rebel		Adil El Arbi and Bilall Fallah
2022 (12th)	Nowhere		Peter Monsaert
2023 (13th)	When It Melts	Het smelt	Veerle Baetens
2023 (13th)	Holly		Fien Troch
2023 (13th)	Luka		Jessica Woodworth
2024 (14th)	Julie Keeps Quiet	Julie zwijgt	Leonardo Van Dijl
2024 (14th)	Here		Bas Devos
2024 (14th)	Skunk		Koen Mortier
2024 (14th)	Young Hearts		Anthony Schatteman
2024 (14th)	Wil		Tim Mielants
2025 (15th)	Julian		Cato Kusters
2025 (15th)	BXL		Mounir Ait Hamou and Ish Ait Hamou
2025 (15th)	Radioman		Frank Van Passel
2025 (15th)	Soft Leaves		Miwako Van Weyenberg
