= Ruben Impens =

Belgian cinematographer (born 1971)

- Born: 18 January 1975 (age 50); Ghent, Belgium
- Occupation: Cinematographer
- Years active: 1995–present

Ruben Impens (born 18 January 1975) is a Belgian cinematographer. He is best known for his collaborations with Felix van Groeningen and Julia Ducournau, having worked as director of photography on all of their feature films. He has also worked on several documentaries, short films, and television programs.

Impens received the Kodak Award for Best Cinematography at the Hamptons International Film Festival for The Misfortunates (2009). His work on the film The Broken Circle Breakdown (2012) was awarded the Ensor Award for Best Cinematography. Impens won the Magritte Award for Best Cinematography for his work on Titane (2021).

== Filmography ==
- 2004: Steve + Sky
- 2007: With Friends Like These
- 2008: Moscow, Belgium
- 2009: The Misfortunates
- 2010: Adem
- 2010: Turquaze
- 2011: Code 37
- 2012: The Broken Circle Breakdown
- 2012: Brasserie Romantiek
- 2012: Offline
- 2015: Café Derby
- 2015: The Sky Above Us
- 2016: Black Mirror (Episode: "Men Against Fire")
- 2016: Belgica
- 2016: Kokoro
- 2016: Raw
- 2017: Zagros
- 2018: Beautiful Boy
- 2019: Dirty God
- 2019: The Mustang
- 2021: Titane
- 2022: The Eight Mountains
- 2024: Animale
- 2024: Fiore Mio
- 2025: Alpha
