= With Friends Like These (2007 film) =

2007 film directed by Felix van Groeningen

- Theatrical release poster
- Directed by: Felix van Groeningen
- Written by: Felix van Groeningen; Arne Sierens
- Produced by: Dirk Impens
- Starring: Koen De Graeve; Wine Dierickx
- Cinematography: Ruben Impens
- Edited by: Nico Leunen
- Music by: Jef Neve
- Production companies: Menuet; Scope Pictures
- Distributed by: Kinepolis Film Distribution
- Release date: March 21, 2007 (Belgium)
- Running time: 100 minutes
- Country: Belgium
- Languages: Dutch; Flemish; French

With Friends Like These (Dutch: Dagen zonder lief) is a 2007 Belgian comedy drama film directed by Felix van Groeningen, from a screenplay by van Groeningen and Arne Sierens. The film follows a group of lifelong friends whose lives are turned upside down when Black Kelly (Dierickx), one of their friends whom they haven't heard from since they were teenagers, returns to visit her mother after living in New York for several years.

== Cast ==
- Koen De Graeve as Nick
- Wine Dierickx as Black Kelly
- Pieter Genard as Kurt
- An Miller as Blonde Kelly
- Jeroen Perceval as Frederic
- Tania Van der Sanden as Mother Black Kelly
- Charlotte Vandermeersch as Ingrid

== Synopsis ==
The lives of a group of friends get disturbed when Black Kelly (named after her hair color) returns from New York where she works in fashion to visit her mother. Her arrival leads to problems for Frederic when his girlfriend Ingrid, who's away on a volleyball tournament, thinks he's having an affair with Kelly after he invites Kelly to stay with him. The two of them reunite with their schooldays gang which includes Nick. Black Kelly discovers that Patrick committed suicide during her absence and Kurt and Blonde Kelly now live together with their one-year-old child. Tension arises among the group after Black Kelly tells Kurt she never told him she was pregnant with their baby before having an abortion. This provokes the already troubled Kurt to run away. The three friends go on a road-trip to find him.

== Production ==
Filming took place in Sint-Niklaas, Belgium and Auvergne, France.

== Release ==
The film premiered at the 2007 International Film Festival Rotterdam. The film was released in theatres on March 21, 2007 in Belgium.
