= Loft (2008 film) =

2008 film by Erik Van Looy

- Theatrical release poster
- Directed by: Erik Van Looy
- Written by: Bart De Pauw
- Produced by: Hilde De Laere
- Starring: Koen De Bouw; Filip Peeters; Bruno Vanden Broecke; Matthias Schoenaerts; Koen De Graeve; Veerle Baetens; Marie Vinck; An Miller; Tine Reymer; Wine Dierickx; Maaike Cafmeyer; Charlotte Vandermeersch; Dirk Roofthooft; Sara de Roo; Gene Bervoets; Jan Decleir
- Cinematography: Danny Elsen
- Edited by: Philippe Ravoet
- Music by: Wolfram de Marco
- Production company: Woestijnvis
- Distributed by: Independent Films
- Release date: 22 October 2008
- Running time: 118 minutes
- Country: Belgium
- Language: Dutch
- Budget: €3.2 million

Loft is a 2008 Belgian erotic mystery film directed by Erik Van Looy and written by Bart De Pauw, starring an ensemble cast of Flemish actors, led by Koen De Bouw, Filip Peeters, Bruno Vanden Broecke, Matthias Schoenaerts and Koen De Graeve.

== Plot ==
Five married men share ownership of an upmarket loft in Antwerp, which they use to discreetly meet their respective mistresses. When the body of a murdered woman is found in that loft, the men begin to suspect each other of having committed the gruesome crime, as they are the only ones with keys to the premises. Through flashbacks, which are intertwined by scenes from the present, the story is unravelled.

== Cast ==
- Koen De Bouw as Chris Van Outryve
- Filip Peeters as Vincent Stevens
- Bruno Vanden Broecke as Luc Seynaeve
- Matthias Schoenaerts as Filip Willems
- Koen De Graeve as Marnix Laureys
- Veerle Baetens as Ann Marai
- Marie Vinck as Sarah Delporte
- An Miller as Ellen Van Outryve
- Tine Reymer as Barbara Stevens
- Wine Dierickx as Elsie Seynaeve
- Maaike Cafmeyer as Miriam Laureys
- Charlotte Vandermeersch as Vicky Willems
- Gene Bervoets as Mayor Alex Van Esbroeck
- Jan Decleir as Ludwig Tyberghein

== Production ==
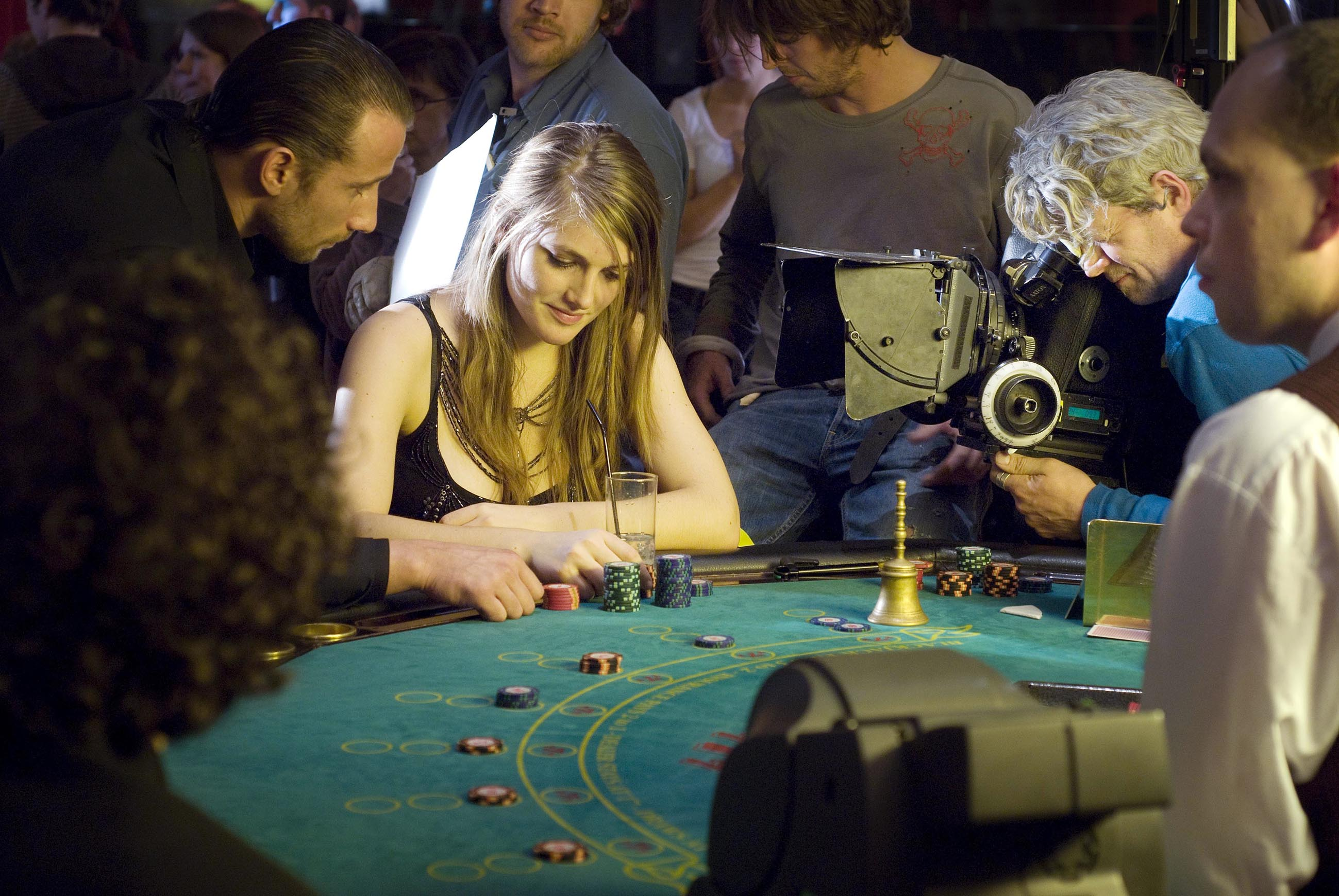
Matthias Schoenaerts and Charlotte Vandermeersch during the shooting of the film at a casino in Ostend

Portions of the film were shot in Ostend in January 2008. The building where the loft is situated is in Antwerp, next to the river Scheldt.

== Reception ==
By 19 February 2009, Loft was the most successful Flemish film ever at the box office with - at the time - 1,082,480 admissions, passing the previous record holder, Koko Flanel (1990). Boyd van Hoeij of Variety gave the film a positive review, praising it as "well-plotted, if not always well-written", but criticising the film's final 20 minutes as killing its tension.

== Remakes ==
A Dutch remake of the same name was released in 2010, directed by Antoinette Beumer.

In 2011, Van Looy himself began production on a Belgian-American remake. Titled The Loft, it was completed in 2014 and stars Karl Urban, James Marsden, Wentworth Miller, Eric Stonestreet and Schoenaerts reprising his role from the original film. The Loft was released theatrically in the United States on 30 January 2015.

In 2021, Netflix India announced an untitled Hindi remake of Loft directed by the director-duo Abbas Mustan, starring Sharman Joshi, Arjun Rampal and Bobby Deol. The film, later titled Penthouse, was ultimately shelved.
