= Time of My Life (film) =

2012 Belgian film

Time of My Live
- Theatrical release poster
- Directed by: Nic Balthazar
- Written by: Nic Balthazar
- Produced by: Peter Bouckaert
- Starring: Koen De Graeve; Geert Van Rampelberg
- Cinematography: Danny Elsen
- Edited by: Philippe Ravoet
- Music by: Henny Vrienten
- Distributed by: Kinepolis Film Distribution
- Release date: March 29, 2012
- Running time: 119 minutes
- Country: Belgium
- Language: Dutch

Time of My Life (Dutch: Tot Altijd) is a 2012 Belgian film written and directed by Nic Balthazar. The story is based upon real life events and contains original news footage.

== Plot ==
The story is set between 1980 and 2002. In 1980 Mario Verstraete was a healthy Belgian with big ambitions. Some years later he is diagnosed with multiple sclerosis. Mario decides to advocate for legalizing euthanasia. He starts up an action group to convince the government to allow the practice under restricted conditions.

His plan works and the Belgian government approves an enactment on 28 May 2002: Euthanasia is allowed when an adult victim can't be cured, has to live in unworthy conditions, and at least three doctors confirm this situation. Verstraete was the first Belgian to commit euthanasia on 30 September 2002.

== Cast ==
- Koen De Graeve - Mario Verstraete
- Geert Van Rampelberg - Thomas
- Lotte Pinoy - Lynn
- Michel van Dousselaere - Roger
- Viviane de Muynck - Francine
- Iwein Segers - Speck
- Felix Maesschalck - Milan
- Eva Van Der Gucht - Sask

== Recognition ==
=== Awards ===
The movie's awards include:

- Magritte Award for Best Flemish Film in Coproduction 2013
- Flemish Film Award for best movie at the Ostend Film Festival 2012
- Flemish Film Award for best actor at the Ostend Film Festival 2012
- Flemish Film Award for best editing at the Ostend Film Festival 2012
- Public favorite at the Seminci film festival in Spain
- Public favorite at The End film festival in Amsterdam
- Grand Prix Hydro-Québec at the International Film Festival of Abitibi

=== Nominations ===
- Festroia International Film Festival 2012
