= Though I Know the River Is Dry =

2013 short film by Omar Robert Hamilton

Though I Know the River is Dry
- Directed by: Omar Robert Hamilton
- Written by: Omar Robert Hamilton
- Produced by: Louis Lewarne
- Starring: Kais Nashef
- Cinematography: Omar Robert Hamilton
- Edited by: Omar Robert Hamilton
- Release date: 2013
- Running time: 19 minutes
- Countries: Palestine, Egypt, United Kingdom, Qatar
- Language: Arabic

Though I Know the River is Dry (Arabic: مع آني آعرف آن النهر قد جف) is a 2013 Palestinian short crowd-sourced film directed by Egyptian-British filmmaker and writer Omar Robert Hamilton.

== Synopsis ==
The film tells the story of a man's return to Palestine years after making a decision to emigrate to America. The story is told through parallel timelines, interweaved with archival footage.

== Critical reception ==
The film premiered in competition at International Film Festival Rotterdam where it won the Prix UIP and the festival's nomination for Best Short Film at the 2013 European Film Awards. The competition jury stated: "The film is remarkable in the way it connects contemporary political issues with emotional dilemmas. Its cinematographic language builds on the qualities of the photographic composition, the direction of the actors and the subtle and intelligent use of archival material. The result embodies a poetic and restrained approach to questions which unfortunately are becoming more and more commonplace. In a particularly undogmatic manner, it offers multiple readings, while simultaneously sharply addressing historical, political and economical realities."

Though I Know the River is Dry won Best Short from the Arab World at the Abu Dhabi Film Festival in November 2013. It has been widely well reviewed.

== Cast ==
- Kais Nashef
- Salwa Nakkara
- Hussam Ghosheh
- Maya Abu Alhayyat

== Awards and nominations ==
- 2013: Winner: Prix UIP at the International Film Festival Rotterdam
- 2013: Winner: Best Short from the Arab World, Abu Dhabi Film Festival
- 2013: Nominee: Best Short Film, European Film Awards
- 2013: Nominee: Tiger Award for Short Film International Film Festival Rotterdam
- 2014: Official Selection: Clermont-Ferrand International Short Film Festival

== See also ==
- List of Palestinian films
