= Charlotte Vandermeersch =

Belgian actress (born 1983)

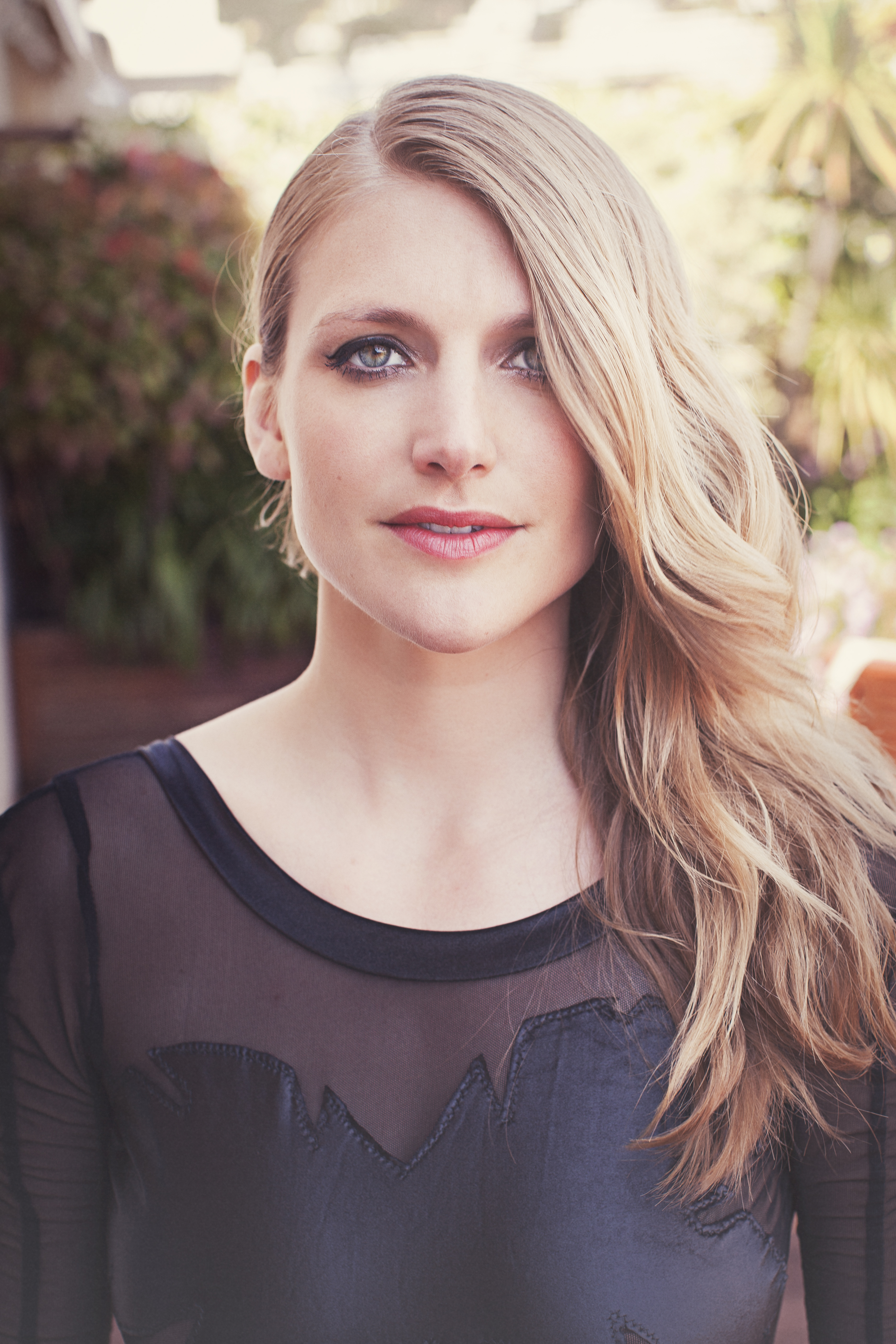
- Vandermeersch in 2015
- Born: 11 November 1983 (age 42); Oudenaarde, Belgium
- Occupations: Actress; screenwriter
- Years active: 1999–present
- Partner: Felix van Groeningen
- Children: 1

Charlotte Vandermeersch (born 11 November 1983) is a Belgian actress and screenwriter.

== Early life ==
Vandermeersch was born in Oudenaarde and grew up in Wannegem, a village in Kruishoutem.

== Career ==
After graduating from high school, Vandermeersch studied drama at the Herman Teirlinck Institute in Antwerp. From 2012 to 2020, she was a member of the theater company Lazarus. She later co-wrote and directed the film The Eight Mountains, which won the Jury Prize at the 2022 Cannes Film Festival. In 2025, she was named Master of the Ostend Film Festival, a title awarded annually to a Flemish film professional.

== Personal life ==
Vandermeersch has three brothers: Edward, Karel, and Antoon. She is in a long-term relationship with director Felix van Groeningen. They have a son, Rufus.

== Filmography ==
=== As actress ===
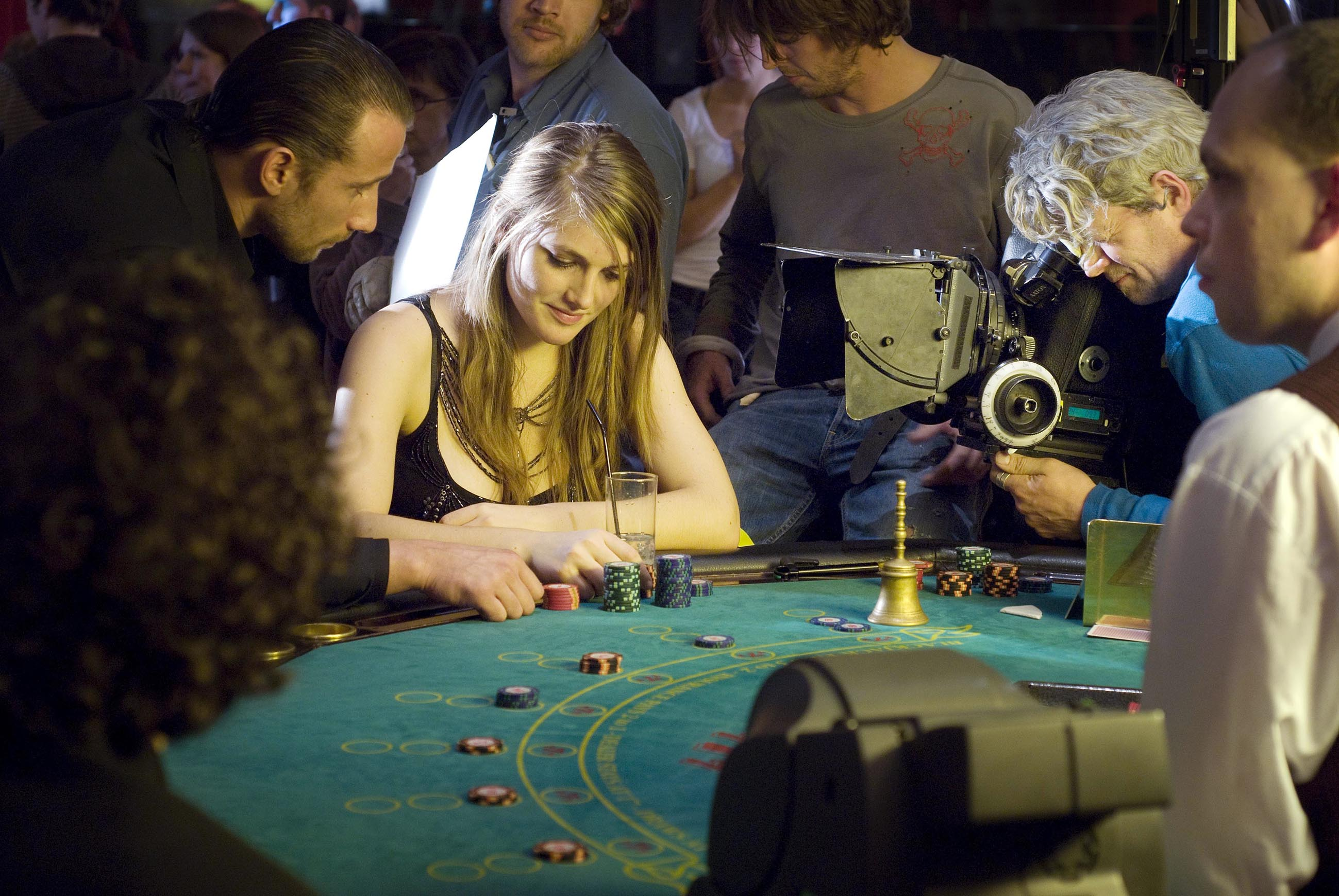
Vandermeersch and Matthias Schoenaerts during the filming of Loft (2008)

==== Film ====
Year	Title	Role	Ref.
2007	With Friends Like These	Ingrid	
2008	Loft	Vicky Willems	
2009	The Misfortunates	Konijn	
2009	Turquoise	Sarah Peters	
2011	Madonna's Pig	Bea	
2014	Bowling Balls	Linda Schools	
2016	Belgica	Isabelle	
2016	Home	Bride	
2016	The Prime Minister	Eva	
2018	Catacombe	Debbie	
2019	Adoration	Lorette Batts	
2024	Traffic	Eva	
2026	Let Love In		

==== Television ====
Year	Title	Role	Notes	Ref.
1999	Flikken	Esther	1 episode	
2005	Kinderen van Dewindt	Isabelle	1 episode	
2007	Witse	Annick	1 episode	
2010	Dag & Nacht	Nathalie Sanders	12 episodes	
2010	Anneliezen	Emma van Snick; Emilie Verschueren	2 episodes	
2011	De Ronde	Liesje	3 episodes	
2011	Het goddelijke monster	Griet Verbeeck	Main role	
2011–2012	Red Sonja	Red Sonja	8 episodes	
2011–2020	What If?	Various characters	25 episodes	
2012	Zingaburia	Princess Axioma	1 episode	
2012	Deadline 14/10	Marianne Smidt	8 episodes	
2012	Code 37	Isabelle Verleyen	1 episode	
2013	Salamander	Jenny	5 episodes	
2014	Vermist	Liesbeth Legaer	2 episodes	
2014	Deadline 25/5	Marianne Smidt	8 episodes	
2015	De Bunker	Valerie	7 episodes	
2017–2020	Hetisingewikkeld	Charlotte	16 episodes	
2020	Amsterdam Vice	Edith Lacroix	5 episodes	
2020	De Anderhalve Meter Show	Various characters	3 episodes	
2021	Déjà Vu	Eveline	1 episode	
2024	Juliet	Trix	6 episodes	

=== Other credits ===
Year	Title	Director	Writer	Producer	Ref.
2022	The Eight Mountains	Yes	Yes	No	
2026	Let Love In	No	Yes	Yes	

== Awards and nominations ==
Award	Year	Category	Nominated work	Result	Ref.
Cannes Film Festival	2022	Palme d'Or	The Eight Mountains	Nominated	
Cannes Film Festival	2022	Jury Prize	The Eight Mountains	Won	
David di Donatello	2023	Best Director	The Eight Mountains	Nominated	
David di Donatello	2023	Best Adapted Screenplay	The Eight Mountains	Won	
Ostend Film Festival	2011	Best Actress	Turquoise	Nominated	
