= Felix van Groeningen =

Belgian film director and screenwriter (born 1977)

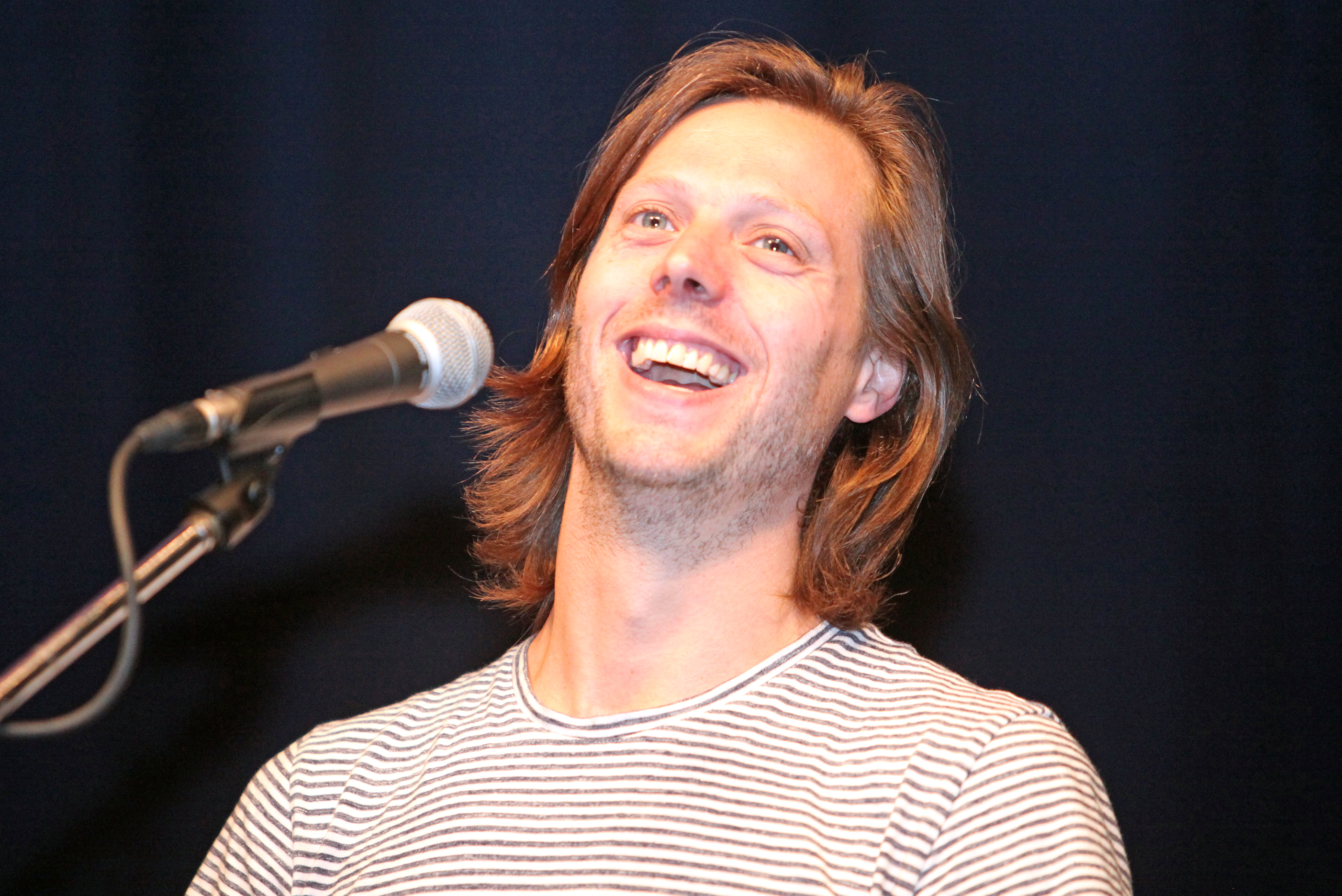
- Van Groeningen in 2016.
- Born: 1 November 1977 (age 49); Ghent, Belgium
- Education: Royal Academy of Fine Arts (KASK)
- Years active: 2000–present
- Partner: Charlotte Vandermeersch
- Children: 1

Felix van Groeningen (Dutch: [ˈfeːlɪks fɑŋ ˈɣrunɪŋə(n)]; born 1 November 1977) is a Belgian filmmaker, most known for the drama film The Broken Circle Breakdown (2012), for which he was nominated for Best International Feature Film at the 86th Academy Awards.

He made his English-language debut with the biographical drama film Beautiful Boy (2018), while his drama film The Eight Mountains (2022) won the Jury Prize at the 75th Cannes Film Festival.

== Early life ==
Van Groeningen was born in Ghent. His parents were hippies who led a very liberal lifestyle. He has an older brother, Seppe. After his parents' divorce, they lived in the same house, but each with a new partner. His father started a live music club 'The Charlatan' when he was twelve-years-old, which became the inspiration for his film Belgica. He studied at the Royal Academy of Fine Arts (KASK) and graduated in 2000 with a Masters of Audiovisual Arts, his masters thesis was the short film 50CC.

== Career ==
=== 2000s ===
After graduating from college, Van Groeningen directed several short films, and written and directed several stage plays. He embarked on a long-term collaboration with Dirk Impens, originally his professor at KASK, who produced all five of Van Groeningen's feature films from 2004 to 2016 under his production company Menuet. Impens announced he was closing down Menuet in July 2017.

Van Groeningen made his directorial feature debut with Steve + Sky (2004), which depicts a romance between a drug dealer and a prostitute, and starred Titus De Voogdt and Delfine Bafort in the titular roles. Van Groeningen later said the film "was about realizing that you're not invincible or immortal" after having an epiphany at age 23 when his father died due to complications with a liver transplant and he lost a close friend to cancer.

His second feature, With Friends Like These (Dutch: Dagen zonder lief) (2007), was a comedy which tells the story of a struggling group of twenty-year-olds whose lives get thrown into limbo when their friend returns from New York.

His third feature film, The Misfortunates (Dutch: De Helaasheid der Dingen) (2009), was a film adaptation the 2006 semi-autobiographical novel of the same name by Dimitri Verhulst. The film follows the life of the thirteen-year-old protagonist, Gunther, who is raised by a family of alcoholics and misfits as he grows up and dreams of being a writer. The film premiered at Cannes Film Festival in the Director's Fortnight section and won the Prix Art et Essai. The film was a box office success in Belgium with 454,435 admissions to cinemas, and was the most watched Flemish film that year in Belgium. The film was selected as the Belgian entry for Best Foreign Language Film at the 82nd Academy Awards, but was not nominated.

=== 2010s ===
The Broken Circle Breakdown (2012), starring Johan Heldenbergh and Veerle Baetens as Didier and Elise, follows a bohemian couple that loses their daughter to cancer. It is an adaptation of a stage play originally written and directed by Heldenbergh. The film was a critical and commercial success, and became the most watched Flemish film in Belgium of the year. The film was nominated for Best Foreign Language Film at the 86th Academy Awards, representing Belgium. It was also nominated for European Film Award for Best Film and won César Award for Best Foreign Film. Van Groeningen was later invited to become a member of Academy of Motion Picture Arts and Sciences in 2014.

His fifth feature film, Belgica (2016), follows the lives of two brothers who start a nightclub but quickly gets swept up in hedonistic pursuits. The film was based upon two real-life brothers who bought 'The Charlatan', a music club owned by his father, in 2000 and managed it for seven years. The film premiered at 2016 Sundance Film Festival where he won the Best Director prize in the World Cinema Dramatic section. The film received mixed reviews from critics but was praised for the soundtrack created by the Flemish band Soulwax, who had previously collaborated with Van Groeningen on Steve + Sky.

Van Groeningen made his English-language debut with the film Beautiful Boy (2018), which he directed and co-wrote, and which stars Steve Carell and Timothée Chalamet. It premiered at the 2018 Toronto International Film Festival, and received positive reviews.

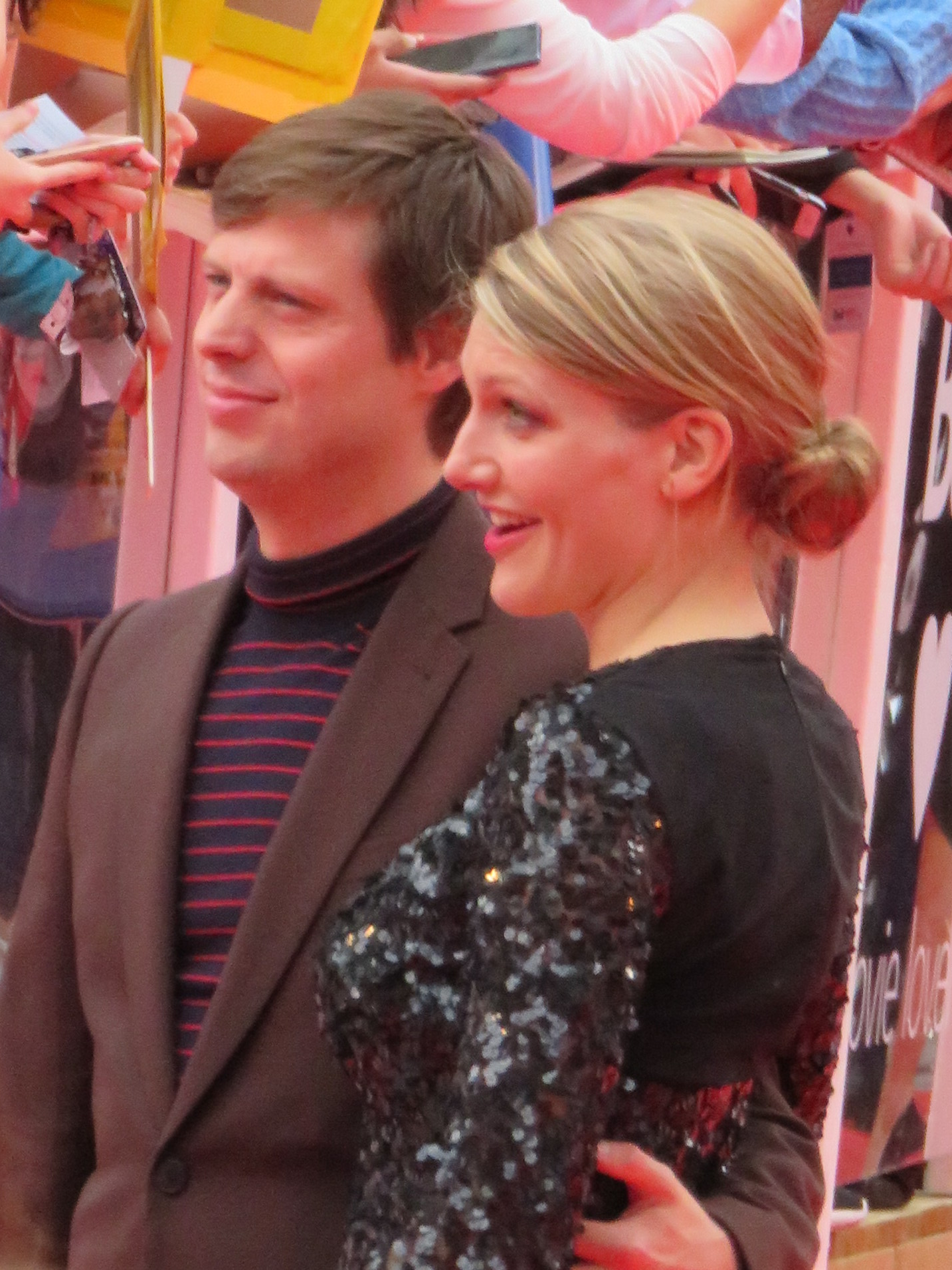
Van Groeningen and Charlotte Vandermeersch at the 2018 Toronto International Film Festival

=== 2020s ===
The Eight Mountains (2022), co-written and co-directed with Charlotte Vandermeersch, had its world premiere in the main competition of the 75th Cannes Film Festival, where it won the Jury Prize. Starring Luca Marinelli and Alessandro Borghi, it is based on the novel of the same name by Paolo Cognetti, and follows friendship between two men who spend their childhood together in a remote Alpine village and reconnect later as adults. It received critical acclaim, and won the David di Donatello for Best Film.

=== Upcoming projects ===
His next feature film, Let Love In, stars Luca Marinelli and Charlotte Vandermeersch, and is loosely based on Van Groeningen's own life.

== Personal life ==
Van Groeningen is in a long-term relationship with Belgian screenwriter and actress Charlotte Vandermeersch. Their son Rufus was born in 2018.

== Filmography ==
=== Feature films ===
Year	English Title	Original title	Notes
2004	Steve + Sky		Feature directorial debut
2007	With Friends Like These	Dagen zonder lief	
2009	The Misfortunates	De Helaasheid der Dingen	
2012	The Broken Circle Breakdown	Alabama Monroe	César Award for Best Foreign Film; Satellite Award for Best Foreign Language Film; 2013 Lux Prize; Nominated—Academy Award for Best Foreign Language Film; Nominated—European Film Award for Best Film; Nominated—European Film Award for Best Director; Nominated—European Film Award for Best Screenwriter
2016	Belgica		Magritte Award for Best Flemish Film; Nominated—Lumière Award for Best French-Language Film
2018	Beautiful Boy		English-language debut Co-screenwriter with Luke Davies
2022	The Eight Mountains	Le otto montagne	Italian-language debut Co-written and co-directed with Charlotte Vandermeersch; Jury Prize (Cannes Film Festival); David di Donatello for Best Film; David di Donatello for Best Adapted Screenplay; Nominated—David di Donatello for Best Director
TBA	Let Love In		Post-production

== Frequent collaborators ==
Work Actor	2004	2007	2009	2012	2016	2018	2022
Work Actor	! class="nowrap ts-vertical-header " style="" | Steve + Sky	With Friends Like These	The Misfortunates	The Broken Circle Breakdown	Belgica	Beautiful Boy	The Eight Mountains
Wine Dierickx							
Johan Heldenbergh							
Titus De Voogdt							
Charlotte Vandermeersch							
Koen De Graeve							
Robbie Cleiren							
Yves Degryse							
Sara De Bosschere							
Nils De Caster							
Dominique Van Malder							
