= The Broken Circle Breakdown =

2012 Belgian drama film by Felix van Groeningen

- Theatrical release poster
- Directed by: Felix van Groeningen
- Screenplay by: Felix van Groeningen; Carl Joos
- Based on: The Broken Circle Breakdown by Johan Heldenbergh and Mieke Dobbels
- Produced by: Dirk Impens; Frans van Gestel; Laurette Schillings; Arnold Heslenfeld
- Starring: Johan Heldenbergh; Veerle Baetens
- Cinematography: Ruben Impens
- Edited by: Nico Leunen
- Music by: Bjorn Eriksson
- Production company: Menuet; Topkapi Films
- Distributed by: Kinepolis Film Distribution
- Release date: 10 October 2012
- Running time: 111 minutes
- Country: Belgium
- Languages: Dutch; English; Flemish
- Box office: $6 million

The Broken Circle Breakdown (also known as Alabama Monroe) is a 2012 Belgian romantic drama film directed by Felix van Groeningen, from a screenplay by van Groeningen and Carl Joos. The film is based on the stage play of the same name by Johan Heldenbergh and Mieke Dobbels. Starring Heldenbergh and Veerle Baetens, the film follows musicians Didier (Heldenbergh) and Elise (Baetens), whose relationship is tested when their young daughter Maybelle becomes seriously ill.

The Broken Circle Breakdown was theatrically released in Belgium on 10 October 2012 and grossed $6 million at the box office. The film received critical acclaim and was selected as the Belgian entry for the Best Foreign Language Film at the 86th Academy Awards, and was on the nominated shortlist. It won Best Foreign Film at the 39th César Awards, and was also the winner of the 2013 Lux Prize.

== Plot ==
The film is set in Ghent, in the Flemish Region of Belgium, and chronicles the lives of Didier (Johan Heldenbergh) and Elise (Veerle Baetens) over seven years as they fall in love through their passion for bluegrass music. Didier meets Elise in her tattoo parlour and invites her to the performance of his bluegrass band. They soon fall in love. When Didier discovers Elise has a wonderful voice, she joins their band as a singer. After a few months, Elise discovers she is unexpectedly pregnant. Even though it comes as a shock at first, the couple is happy. Their daughter Maybelle is born and for a few years, they live a happy life and have success with their band.

After her sixth birthday, Maybelle develops cancer and her health quickly deteriorates. She succumbs to it within a year. The death of Maybelle has a devastating effect on Didier and Elise's relationship and their lives. Didier focuses on scientism, especially after George W. Bush opposes embryonic stem cell research under pressure of creationists and the anti-abortion movement. Elise finds solace in spiritualism and reincarnation. The two grow further and further apart until Elise attempts suicide. She is rushed to the hospital but she is found braindead. Didier agrees to stop the artificial respiration. Finally the band plays a song around Elise's deathbed.

== Cast ==
- Johan Heldenbergh as Didier Bontinck / Monroe
- Veerle Baetens as Elise Vandevelde / Alabama
- Nell Cattrysse as Maybelle
- Geert Van Rampelberg as William
- Nils De Caster as Jock
- Robbie Cleiren as Jimmy
- Bert Huysentruyt as Jef
- Jan Bijvoet as Koen
- Blanka Heirman as Denise

== Production ==
The film was shot from 18 July to 8 September 2011 in Belgium.

== Soundtrack ==
The bluegrass soundtrack includes traditional songs as well as music composed for the film by Bjorn Eriksson. All the music in the band scenes is performed by the actors.

1. "Will the Circle Be Unbroken?" See also "Can the Circle Be Unbroken (By and By)"
2. "The Boy Who Wouldn't Hoe Corn" by Alison Krauss, Pat Brayer, Jerry Douglas, Dan Tyminski, Barry Bales, and Ron Block
3. "Dusty Mixed Feelings"
4. "Wayfaring Stranger"
5. "Rueben's Train"
6. "Country in My Genes"
7. "Further on Up The Road"
8. "Where Are You Heading, Tumbleweed?"
9. "Over in the Gloryland"
10. "Cowboy Man"
11. "If I Needed You"
12. "Carved Tree Inn"
13. "Sandmountain"
14. "Sister Rosetta Goes Before Us"
15. "Blackberry Blossom"

== Reception ==
=== Critical response ===
The Broken Circle Breakdown has an approval rating of 83% on review aggregator website Rotten Tomatoes, based on 103 reviews, and an average rating of 7.30/10. The website's critical consensus states, "The Broken Circle Breakdown's reach occasionally exceeds its grasp, but overall, it's an intoxicating, finely wrought romance -- and one with a terrific soundtrack to boot". It also has a score of 70 out of 100 on Metacritic, based on 29 critics, indicating "generally favorable reviews".

Boyd van Hoeij of Variety wrote: "Sophisticated cutting brings out the story’s complex emotional undercurrents, though "Breakdown’s" less convincingly scripted second half sputters more often than it shines." David Rooney of The Hollywood Reporter wrote: "The non-linear structure works extremely well, making the drama a bracing emotional roller coaster of feel-good/feel-bad turns."

The Norwegian bluegrass group, Hayde Bluegrass Orchestra, cited the film as a major influence in their formation.

=== Accolades ===
Award	Category	Recipient(s)	Result
Academy Awards	Best Foreign Language Film	Belgium	Nominated
César Awards	Best Foreign Film	The Broken Circle Breakdown	Won
Denver Film Critics Society	Best Foreign Language Film	The Broken Circle Breakdown	Nominated
European Film Awards	European Film	The Broken Circle Breakdown	Nominated
European Film Awards	European Director	Felix Van Groeningen	Nominated
European Film Awards	European Actress	Veerle Baetens	Won
European Film Awards	European Actor	Johan Heldenbergh	Nominated
European Film Awards	European Screenwriter	Carl Joos, Felix van Groeningen	Nominated
European Film Awards	People's Choice Award for Best European Film	The Broken Circle Breakdown	Nominated
San Diego Film Critics Society	Best Foreign Language Film	The Broken Circle Breakdown	Nominated
San Diego Film Critics Society	Best Original Score	Bjorn Eriksson	Nominated
Satellite Awards	Best Foreign Language Film	The Broken Circle Breakdown	Won
Tribeca Film Festival	Best Actress in a Narrative Feature Film	Veerle Baetens	Won
Tribeca Film Festival	Best Screenplay for a Narrative Feature Film	Carl Joos, Felix Van Groeningen	Won
Washington D.C. Area Film Critics Association	Best Foreign Language Film	The Broken Circle Breakdown	Won
Lux Prize	-	The Broken Circle Breakdown	Won

== See also ==
- List of Belgian submissions for the Academy Award for Best Foreign Language Film
- List of submissions to the 86th Academy Awards for Best Foreign Language Film
- Hayde Bluegrass Orchestra
