= Belgica (film) =

2016 film directed by Felix Van Groeningen

- Theatrical release poster
- Directed by: Felix Van Groeningen
- Written by: Arne Sieren; Felix Van Groeningen
- Produced by: Dirk Impens
- Starring: Stef Aerts; Tom Vermeir; Hélène Devos; Charlotte Vandermeersch
- Cinematography: Ruben Impens
- Edited by: Nico Leunen
- Music by: Soulwax
- Distributed by: Kinepolis Film Distribution; Pyramide Distribution
- Release dates: 21 January 2016 (Sundance); 2 March 2016 (Belgium & France)
- Running time: 127 minutes
- Countries: Belgium; France
- Languages: Dutch; French
- Budget: €3.6 million

Belgica is a 2016 Belgian drama film directed by Felix Van Groeningen, written by Van Groeningen and Arne Sierens. It stars Stef Aerts, Tom Vermeir, Hélène Devos, and Charlotte Vandermeersch. The movie is based upon a true story and revolves around a group of friends trying to run a bar where rock bands come to play. Belgica has since then become a cult classic.

The film premiered at the Sundance Film Festival on January 21, 2016. It was released in Belgium and France on March 2, 2016, by Kinepolis Film Distribution and Pyramide Distribution.

== Plot ==
Jo runs “Belgica,” an artsy pub in Ghent that welcomes people from all walks of life. His brother Frank is a shareholder in a used car business.

The two brothers are estranged due to their abusive, alcoholic father. One evening, Frank visits Jo’s pub and enjoys the atmosphere. He starts coming by more often. When the warehouse next door goes up for sale, Frank persuades Jo to buy it and convert it into a dance hall, while also giving “Belgica” a makeover. They agree to become equal partners, each owning 50%. To raise the funds, Frank sells his shares in the car business. However, his business partner can only pay a small portion upfront due to cash flow issues, though they have a verbal agreement that the rest will be paid in a few months.

When the new dance hall is inspected, the venue is approved for a maximum of 80 people because there’s only one legal emergency exit that leads to a narrow alley. Frank bribes the inspector with a large sum of dirty money to bypass this restriction.

The revamped “Belgica” becomes a hit, and Jo and Frank hire several employees—mostly friends. One night, a known troublemaker starts a fight. Frank and his “security team” overpower him and lock him in a room until the police arrive. The police inform them that detaining someone like that is illegal, but offer a deal: if Jo and Frank don’t press charges, the police will overlook the shady activities at “Belgica,” including the use of black money and suspected drug use. In reality, drugs are indeed being used—by both staff and owners. Later, the same troublemaker returns, and Frank assaults him. Manu, the head of security, disapproves and resigns. Frank convinces Jo to hire a professional security team instead of relying on friends. His hidden agenda is to keep out troublemakers and lower-class patrons, which leads to many regulars being turned away.

As profits fall short of expectations, drink prices go up. Frank begins making unilateral decisions. He opens a VIP bar on the second floor to boost revenue but ignores the extra costs involved.

“Belgica” is no longer the place Jo envisioned. He decides to leave and offers to sell his shares to Frank based on the official accounting records. Frank is upset, having invested a lot of undeclared money that isn’t reflected in the books. Eventually, he agrees and contacts his former business partner—only to discover he’s vanished, meaning Frank will never recover the remaining funds.

In the end, Frank walks away. Jo continues running the pub with two new investors. Frank and his wife use the money from the share sale to build a house. Jo returns to “Belgica,” but it has lost its identity, charm, and loyal customers.

== Cast ==
- Stef Aerts as Jo
- Tom Vermeir as Frank
- Héléne Devos as Marieke
- Charlotte Vandermeersch as Isabelle
- Boris Van Severen as Tim Coppens
- Sara De Bosschere as Nikki
- Dominique Van Malder as Manu Dewaey
- Sam Louwyck as Rodrigo
- Stefaan De Winter as Ferre
- Silvanus Saow as Rudy Rasta

== History ==
The movie is based upon true events. Jo Van Groeningen, the father of director Felix Van Groeningen, started a pub in Ghent in 1988 with the name "Charlatan". Many of the events in the film actually did happen: many of the employees were friends, the adjacent house was turned over in a dance room, professional security staff was hired (in this case with the intention to prohibit access to drug addicts),... . Although "Belgica" seems to be bankrupt at the end of the movie, pub "Charlatan" still exists.

== Production ==
The film was shot in Ghent between December 1, 2014 and January 10, 2015. The soundtrack consists of 15 pieces of music by Soulwax, a band formed by the Dewaele brothers from Ghent, composed specifically for the movie. Soulwax composed music of different styles for each of the sixteen fictional bands that performed at the club in the movie. One of the bands, the Shitz, included Sarah and Boris Zeebroek of the band Hong Kong Dong.

== Release ==
The film had its world premiere at the Sundance Film Festival on January 21, 2016, where it opened the World Dramatic Competition. Shortly after, Netflix acquired global distribution rights to the film, excluding select territories. It was released in Belgium and France on March 2, 2016. It was released on April 15, 2016, by Netflix.

The soundtrack was released by PIAS Recordings on February 26, 2016.

== Reception ==
Van Groeningen won the Best Director prize in the World Cinema Dramatic section at the 2016 Sundance Film Festival. The film received a Magritte Award for Best Flemish Film at the 7th Magritte Awards.

Many reviews of the film highlighted the film's soundtrack. Todd McCarthy of The Hollywood Reporter wrote "Van Groeningen catches the ebb and flow of [the brothers' success] in a very fluid way, synching up dramatic and mood shifts with apt musical choices that make the film a sensual pleasure." Lanre Bakare of The Guardian praised the film's accuracy in "replicating hedonism going off the rails" instead of being "a morality tale about excess and its certain fatal consequences", also mentioning the "great Soulwax soundtrack" in their four-star review of the film.
