= The Misfortunates =

- Directed by: Felix Van Groeningen
- Screenplay by: Felix Van Groeningen; Christophe Dirickx
- Based on: De Helaasheid der Dingen by Dimitri Verhulst
- Produced by: Dirk Impens; Jeroen Beker; Frans van Gestel
- Starring: Kenneth Vanbaeden; Valentijn Dhaenens; Koen De Graeve; Wouter Hendrickx; Johan Heldenbergh; Bert Haelvoet
- Cinematography: Ruben Impens
- Edited by: Nico Leunen
- Music by: Jef Neve
- Distributed by: Menuet; IDTV
- Release date: 16 May 2009
- Running time: 108 minutes
- Country: Belgium
- Language: Dutch

The Misfortunates (Dutch: De Helaasheid der Dingen) is a 2009 Belgian comedy-drama film directed by Felix Van Groeningen. It is adapted from the 2006 semi-autobiographical novel of the same name by Belgian writer Dimitri Verhulst. The film stars Kenneth Vanbaeden, Valentijn Dhaenens, Koen De Graeve, Wouter Hendrickx, Johan Heldenbergh, Bert Haelvoet, and Gilda De Bal.

== Synopsis ==
In the 1980s, Gunther Strobbe (Kenneth Vanbaeden) is a thirteen-year-old boy living with his father, Celle (Koen De Graeve), his three uncles Petrol, Breeje, Koen, (Wouter Hendrickx, Johan Heldenbergh, and Bert Haelvoet respectively) and his grandmother Meetje (Gilda De Bal). Celle works part-time as a postman, while his brothers are boozing layabouts who live off their mother's pension. The men of this family spend their days drinking beer and eating sausage, breaking things, playing pranks on people, and chasing women. In the present day, Gunther has made a career as a writer when his girlfriend suddenly falls pregnant with a son—apprehensive of his new responsibilities, Gunther seeks out his father and his uncles for some advice on fatherhood.

== Cast ==
- Kenneth Vanbaeden as 13-year-old Gunther Strobbe
- Valentijn Dhaenens as 33-year-old Gunther Strobbe
- Koen De Graeve as Marcel 'Celle' Strobbe
- Wouter Hendrickx as Lowie 'Petrol' Strobbe
- Johan Heldenbergh as Pieter 'Breeze' Strobbe
- Bert Haelvoet as Koen Strobbe
- Gilda De Bal as Meetje
- Pauline Grossen as Aunt Rosie
- Sofie Palmers as Cousin Sylvie

== Critical reception ==
The chief film critic of The New York Times, Manohla Dargis, wrote: "The revelation of the adult Gunther’s thinking and being – he’s callous, near brutal to his girlfriend – is extremely well managed and shows just how subtle this loud, seemingly rough tale really is." Variety described the film as starting out as an "extremely lowbrow comedy" but later "morphing into a bittersweet meditation on whether familial love and pride are enough to sustain a proper upbringing." LA Weekly compared the film to mixing "the visual exuberance of Trainspotting with the familial pathos of Angela’s Ashes".

== Accolades ==
The film won the Prix Art et Essai at Cannes Film Festival in the Director's Fortnight section. The film was the official Belgian entry for the 82nd Academy Awards in 2010 in the category of Best Foreign Language Film.

== See also ==
- List of submissions to the 82nd Academy Awards for Best Foreign Language Film
- List of Belgian submissions for the Academy Award for Best Foreign Language Film
