= The Eight Mountains =

2022 Italian drama

- Release poster
- Italian: Le otto montagne
- Directed by: Felix van Groeningen; Charlotte Vandermeersch
- Screenplay by: Felix van Groeningen; Charlotte Vandermeersch
- Based on: The Eight Mountains by Paolo Cognetti
- Produced by: Mario Gianani; Lorenzo Gangarossa
- Starring: Luca Marinelli; Alessandro Borghi
- Cinematography: Ruben Impens
- Edited by: Nico Leunen
- Music by: Daniel Norgren
- Production companies: Wildside; Rufus; Menuetto; Pyramide Productions; Vision Distribution
- Distributed by: Vision Distribution (Italy); Kinepolis Film Distribution (Belgium); Pyramide Films (France)
- Release dates: 18 May 2022 (Cannes); 14 December 2022 (Belgium); 21 December 2022 (France); 22 December 2022 (Italy)
- Running time: 147 minutes
- Countries: Italy; Belgium; France
- Language: Italian
- Box office: $11.4 million

The Eight Mountains (Italian: Le otto montagne) is a 2022 drama film co-directed by Felix van Groeningen and Charlotte Vandermeersch, who co-adapted the screenplay from the novel of the same name by Paolo Cognetti. The film depicts a friendship between two men who spend their childhood together in a remote Alpine village and reconnect later as adults. The title is a reference to the concept in Buddhism and ancient Indian cosmology that the world is composed of nine mountains and eight seas, specifically eight concentric circular mountain ranges separated from one another by eight seas, with the ninth and tallest mountain, Mount Meru, at the center.

The film premiered in competition at the 75th Cannes Film Festival on 18 May 2022, where it won the Jury Prize tying with EO. The next year it was awarded the David di Donatello for Best Film.

== Plot ==
In the summer of 1984, Pietro, an 11-year-old from Turin, and his mother Francesca rent a house in a village called Grana in the Italian Alps. There they meet Bruno, the last kid remaining in the village; estranged from his parents, he lives with his uncles and aunt. Pietro and Bruno quickly become friends and waste the summer away. Months later, Pietro's father Giovanni arrives as well and the trio go on a hike. One day, Bruno informs Pietro that Pietro's parents have offered to adopt Bruno so he can go to school in Turin, and his uncle has agreed. Pietro has a complex reaction to this idea, which he identifies as believing Bruno should not be uprooted from his world, and protests the decision. Bruno's father is angry at the interference and soon takes him away to work for the summer and they do not see each other again for some time.

Five years later, the 16-year-old Pietro and Bruno coincidentally meet at a bar, neither speaking to the other. Pietro's family returns to Grana, but it's not the same without Bruno. Soon, Pietro stops visiting the mountains, and clashes between him and his father lead them to grow apart.

Fifteen years later, 31-year-old Pietro has found a job at a restaurant in Turin. One winter night, he receives a call from his mother that his father has died. He also learns that in his absence his father has continued to see Bruno. He returns to Grana. Eventually he finds Bruno in the mountains where his father has left a pile of rocks and wood on a slope intending to build a house. It becomes clear that while Pietro was alienated from his father, his father had become closer to Bruno. Bruno confronts Pietro with the aimlessness of his life and pushes him to help him build the house his father had wanted. They begin work, lasting months. Bruno plans to restore his uncle's pasture and continue living the life of a mountaineer and encourages Pietro to follow his dream and write a book.

The following summer, Pietro returns to Grana with new friends including Lara, with whom he is briefly involved. Months later, Bruno calls Pietro to tell him that Lara is interested in working with him; Bruno and Lara soon become a couple and have a daughter.

Feeling dissatisfied with his aimless life, Pietro decides to reinvent himself by visiting Nepal. After publishing his book, Pietro visits Bruno. One night, Pietro tells him about a Nepalese he met who described how the world consists of eight circular mountain ranges divided by eight seas, and at the center of it all is Mount Meru, the tallest mountain. Pietro asks Bruno whether the person who has visited the eight mountains and eight seas is more learned than the person who has scaled Mount Meru. Bruno identifies himself as being on Mount Meru and Pietro claims to be visiting the eight mountains and that he is more knowledgeable.

Back in Nepal, Pietro begins dating schoolteacher Asmi. Returning to Grana, he informs Bruno of his plans to settle down in Nepal and that he probably will not be returning to Grana yearly; Bruno invites him to dinner. Pietro hikes to a peak he and his father Giovanni reached decades ago and finds the summit book in which Giovanni had written on that occasion. In this and similar summit books on other mountain peaks he finds his father's experiences and feelings during hikes there with Pietro and Bruno and later with just Bruno. Later at dinner, Bruno and Lara argue over financial issues, with her accusing him of having his head in the clouds. Pietro offers to help but Bruno refuses.

One day back in Nepal, Pietro receives a call from Bruno, who tells him that his pasture has been taken away and that Lara and their daughter are living with her family. He wants to spend some alone time at the house they built and would appreciate Pietro's company. Pietro obliges. One night, Bruno reminisces about the former happiness of his marriage; Pietro replies that he is a good father who should take up a regular job so he will not abandon his daughter like his father did him. Angered, Bruno tells Pietro to leave. Pietro visits Lara, who tells him that she now understands how little she means to Bruno in comparison to his mountain. Pietro remarks that he wandered too far away and should have stayed there. He makes up with Bruno, who accepts his life living alone in the mountains. Bruno tells Pietro not to worry about him because the mountain has never hurt him.

One day, Lara calls Pietro and tells him that a snowstorm buried the house and Bruno is nowhere to be found, possibly dead. When the snow starts to thaw, birds are seen scavenging on something partially buried in the snow, presumably Bruno. (This is related to an earlier discussion of the Nepalese “sky burial” ritual, where the deceased are left on the mountains for animals to consume).

As rescuers had broken into the house by making a hole in the roof, Pietro reasons that the house will not last, either because in some lives, there are mountains to which one cannot return, including the one at the center of it all. As he plays soccer with children at Asmi's school, he realizes that all that remains is to wander the eight mountains because on the highest mountain, he lost a friend.

== Cast ==
- Luca Marinelli as Pietro
  - Lupo Barbiero as young Pietro
  - Andrea Palma as adolescent Pietro
- Alessandro Borghi as Bruno
  - Cristiano Sassella as young Bruno
  - Francesco Palombelli as adolescent Bruno
- Filippo Timi as Giovanni
- Elena Lietti as Francesca
- Elisabetta Mazzullo as Lara
- Surakshya Panta as Asmi

== Production ==
The film was shot in the Italian Alps, Turin, and Nepal over seven months, beginning in the summer of 2021.

== Soundtrack ==
The soundtrack consists almost entirely of songs written by Swedish singer-songwriter Daniel Norgren.

== Release ==
The film had its world premiere in competition at the 75th Cannes Film Festival on 18 May 2022. It had a limited theatrical release in USA by Janus Films on 28 April 2023, in France on 21 December 2022, and in Italy the following day.

== Reception ==
=== Box office ===
The Eight Mountains grossed $302,456 in North America, and $11 million in other territories.

=== Critical response ===
On review aggregator Rotten Tomatoes, 91% of 106 critics' reviews are positive, with an average rating of 7.9/10. The website's consensus reads: "Patient, profound and sometimes a bit ponderous, The Eight Mountains reaches breathtaking peaks in its careful observance of an intimate friendship." On Metacritic, the film has a weighted average score of 78 out of 100 based on 28 critics, indicating "favorable reviews".

== See also ==
- List of Italian films of 2022
