= Veerle Baetens =

Belgian actress and singer

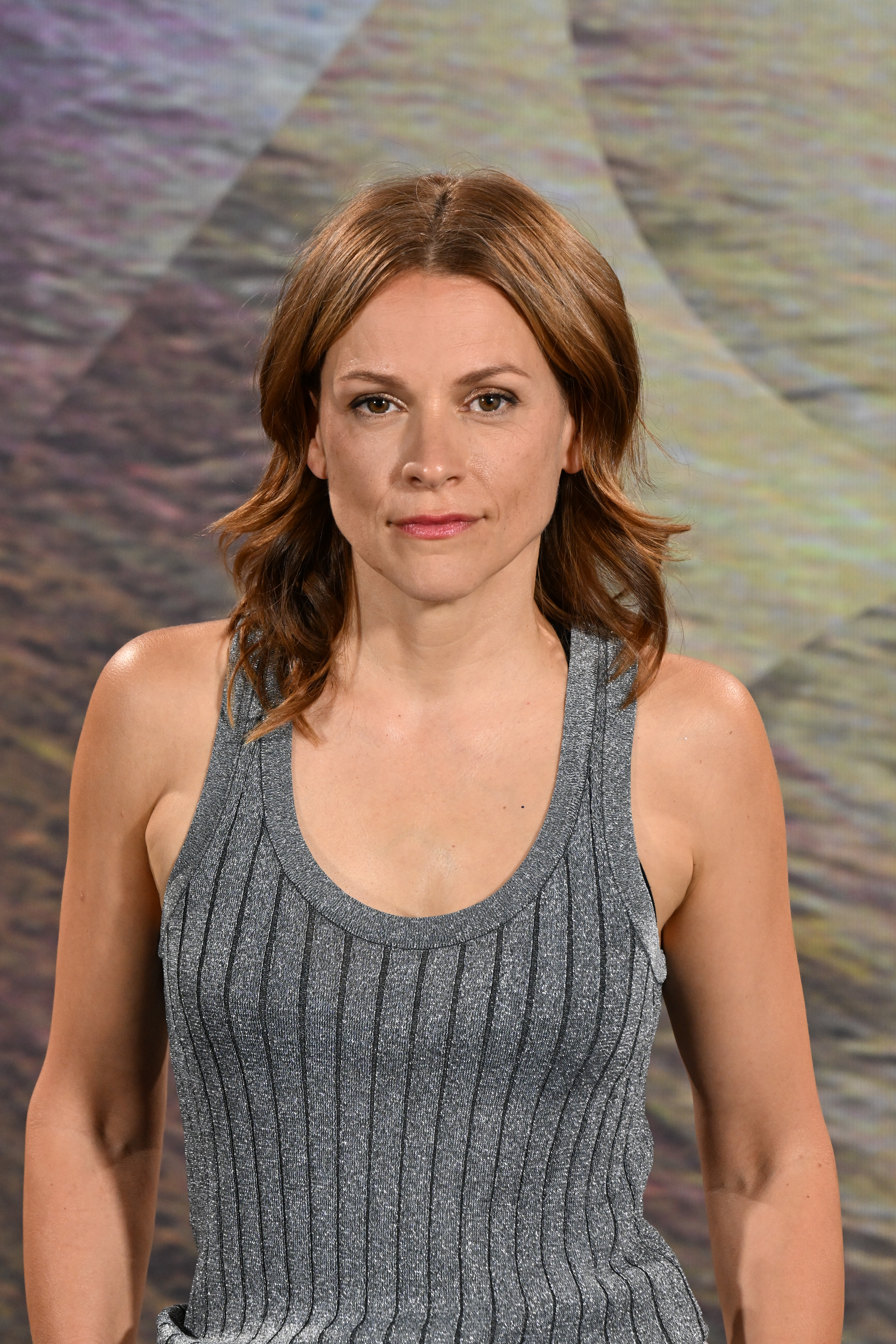
- Baetens at the Locarno Film Festival, Switzerland, August 2025
- Born: 24 January 1978 (age 47); Brasschaat, Antwerp, Belgium
- Occupation(s): Actress, filmmaker, singer
- Years active: 1998–present

Veerle Baetens (born 24 January 1978) is a Belgian actress, filmmaker, and singer best known for her lead role as Elise / Alabama in the romantic drama film The Broken Circle Breakdown (2012), for which she won the Tribeca Film Festival Award for Best Actress. She is also known for her lead role as Detective Hannah Maes on the VTM crime drama series Code 37 (2009–12).

She made her feature directorial debut with the drama film When It Melts (2023), for which she was nominated for the Grand Jury Prize at the 2023 Sundance Film Festival.

== Early life ==
Baetens was born in Brasschaat, Belgium. She had a musical education at the Hoger Instituut voor Dramatische Kunsten in Brussels.

== Career ==
In 2005, she won the "John Kraaijkamp Musical Award", in the category of 'Leading Actress in a musical', for the title role in the Dutch musical adaptation of Pippi Longstocking.

In 2008, she won the Flemish TV-star Award (Flemish equivalent of the Emmy Award) for Best Actress and Most Popular TV Personality, both for the title role in Sara.

In 2012, she released an album with her band "Dallas", called Take it all.

In 2013, she won the "best actress" category at the European Film Awards for her role in The Broken Circle Breakdown.

In 2013 she portrayed Margaret of Anjou in the Starz miniseries The White Queen, based on the novel of the same name by Philippa Gregory.

In 2023 she made her directorial debut with the film When it Melts.

== Filmography ==
Year	Title	Role	Director	Notes
2000	Misstoestanden	Fanny Kiekeboe	Renaat Coppens	
2002	Alias	Girl at car rental	Jan Verheyen	
2002	Up	The woman	Jeroen Dumoulein & Dirk Verheye	Short
2003–04	Wittekerke	Els 'Rachel Cohen' Jacobs	Several	TV series (20 episodes)
2004	The Kiss	Rita	Hilde Van Mieghem	
2004	De zusjes Kriegel	Anne	Dirk Beliën	
2004	Romance	Chantal	Douglas Boswell	Short
2004	Costa!	Veerle	Robin Pera	TV series (1 episode)
2004	Rupel	Kathy Bergmans	Renaat Coppens (2)	TV series (1 episode)
2004	Sprookjes		Rudi Van Den Bossche	TV series (1 episode)
2004	Flikken	Annick Lafaille	Toon Slembrouck & Dirk Corthout	TV series (4 episodes)
2005	Verlengd weekend	Lisa	Hans Herbots	
2005	Litteken	The woman	Bert Temmerman	Short
2006	Love Belongs to Everyone	Barbara	Hilde Van Mieghem (2)	
2006	Stormforce	Alex Breynaert	Hans Herbots (2)	
2007–08	Sara	Sara De Roose	Several	TV series (164 episodes)
2008	Loft	Ann Marai	Erik Van Looy	
2008	Lang Zullen Ze Leven	Irna	Hans Claes	Short
2008	Samaritan	The nurse	Douglas Boswell (2)	Short
2009	The Over the Hill Band	The nurse	Geoffrey Enthoven	
2009–12	Code 37	Hannah Maes	Several	TV series (39 episodes)
2010	Zot van A.	Anna Reynders	Jan Verheyen (2)	
2010	Yellow	The woman	Stijn Guillaume	Short
2011	Come as You Are	The nurse	Geoffrey Enthoven (2)	
2011	Code 37	Hannah Maes	Jakob Verbruggen	
2012	The Broken Circle Breakdown	Elise Vandevelde/Alabama	Felix Van Groeningen	European Film Award for Best Actress; Tribeca Film Festival Award for Best Actress; Film Club's The Lost Weekend – Best Actress; Film Festival Oostende – Best Actress
2013	The Verdict	Meester Teugels	Jan Verheyen (3)	
2013	The White Queen	Margaret of Anjou	Jamie Payne	TV Mini-Series (Episodes 4 and 5)
2014	Halfway	Natalie	Geoffrey Enthoven (3)	
2014	Cordon	Katja	Tim Mielants	TV series (10 episodes)
2015	The Ardennes	Sylvie	Robin Pront	
2015	Un début prometteur	Mathilde Carmain	Emma Luchini	
2015	The Team	Alicia Verbeeck	Kasper Gaardsøe & Kathrine Windfeld	TV series (8 episodes)
2016	News from Planet Mars	Chloé	Dominik Moll	
2016	Au-delà des murs	Lisa	Hervé Hadmar	TV Mini-Series
2017	Tabula Rasa	[Anne]"Mie" D'Haeze	Kaat Beels & Jonas Govaerts	TV series (9 episodes); Also writer
2018	Mothers' Instinct	Alice Brunelle	Olivier Masset-Depasse	Magritte Award for Best Actress
2018	A Sister (Une sœur)	operator	Delphine Girard	Nominated for an Oscar for best short movie
2019	Cheyenne et Lola	Cheyenne	Eshref Reybrouck	TV series (8 episodes); Nominated - ACS Award for Best Actress
2020	Zuur	Kim	Robin Pront	Short
2023	Through the Night (Quitter la nuit)	Anna	Delphine Girard	Nominated—Magritte Award for Best Actress
2023	When It Melts (Het smelt)		Herself	Magritte Award for Best Flemish Film; Nominated—Ensor Award for Best Film; Nominated—Ensor Award for Best Director; Nominated—Ensor Award for Best Screenplay
2025	The Deal	Alexandra Weiss	Jean-Stéphane Bron	TV series

== Musicals ==
- Cabaret (1998)
- Where were you when... (1999)
- Nonsens (1999)
- Chicago (2000)
- Holiday Love Show (2003)
- Pippi Langkous (2005) – Pippi Langkous

== Awards as film actress ==
Year	Award	Category	Film	Result
2013	European Film Awards	European Actress	The Broken Circle Breakdown	Won
2013	Tribeca Film Festival	Best Actress in a Narrative Feature Film	The Broken Circle Breakdown	Won
2016	Magritte Awards	Best Actress	Un début prometteur	Won
