= Koen De Graeve =

Belgian actor

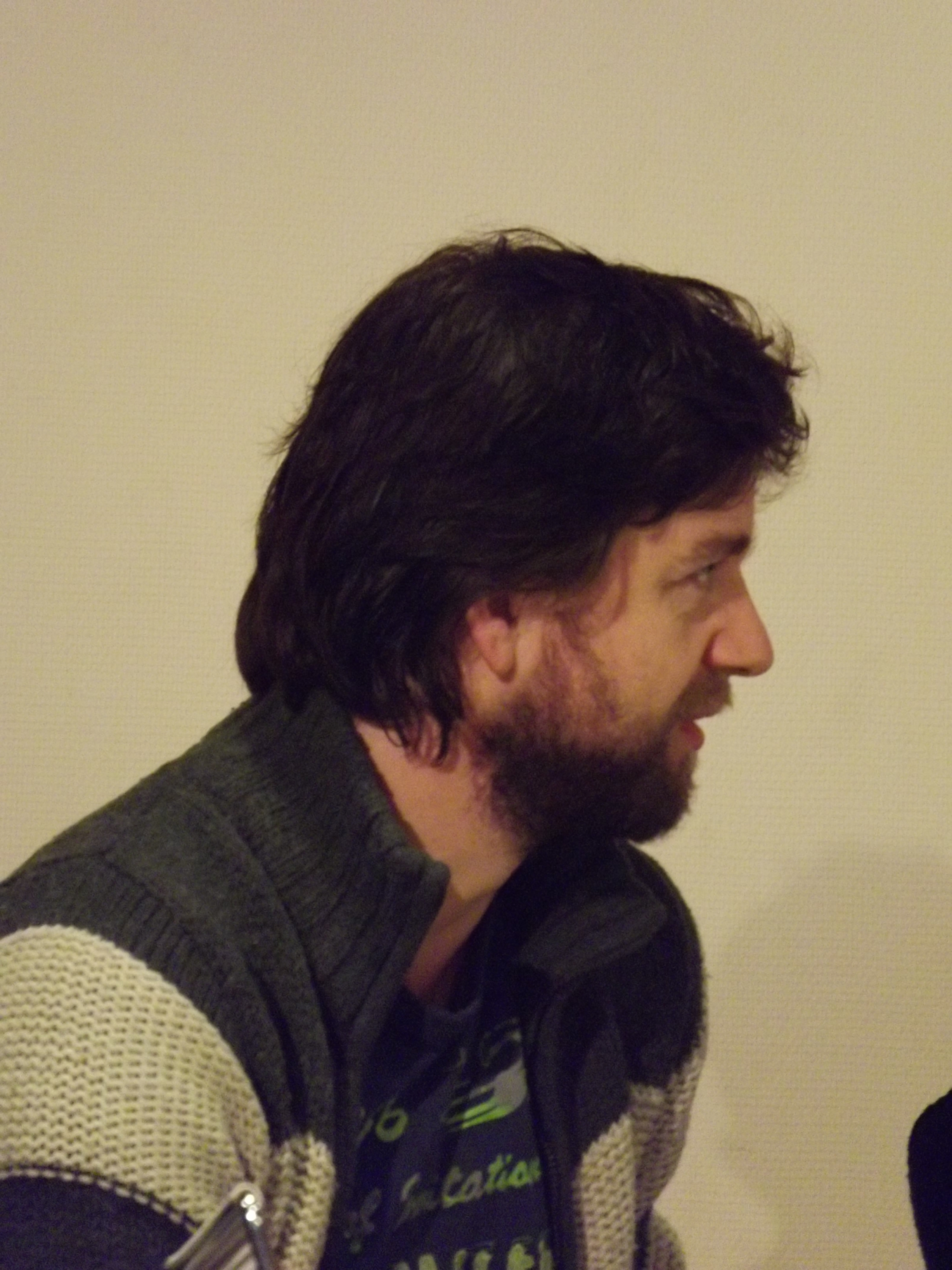
- De Graeve in 2012
- Born: 28 April 1972 (age 54); Aalst, Belgium
- Occupation: Actor
- Years active: 1993-present

Koen De Graeve (born 28 April 1972) is a Belgian actor. He appeared in more than forty films since 1993.

== Selected filmography ==
Film
Year	Title	Role	Notes
2007	With Friends Like These		
2008	Loft		
2009	The Misfortunates	Celle	
2012	Time of My Life		

TV
Year	Title	Role	Notes
2009	Van Vlees en Bloed		
