= Dimitri Verhulst =

Belgian writer and poet

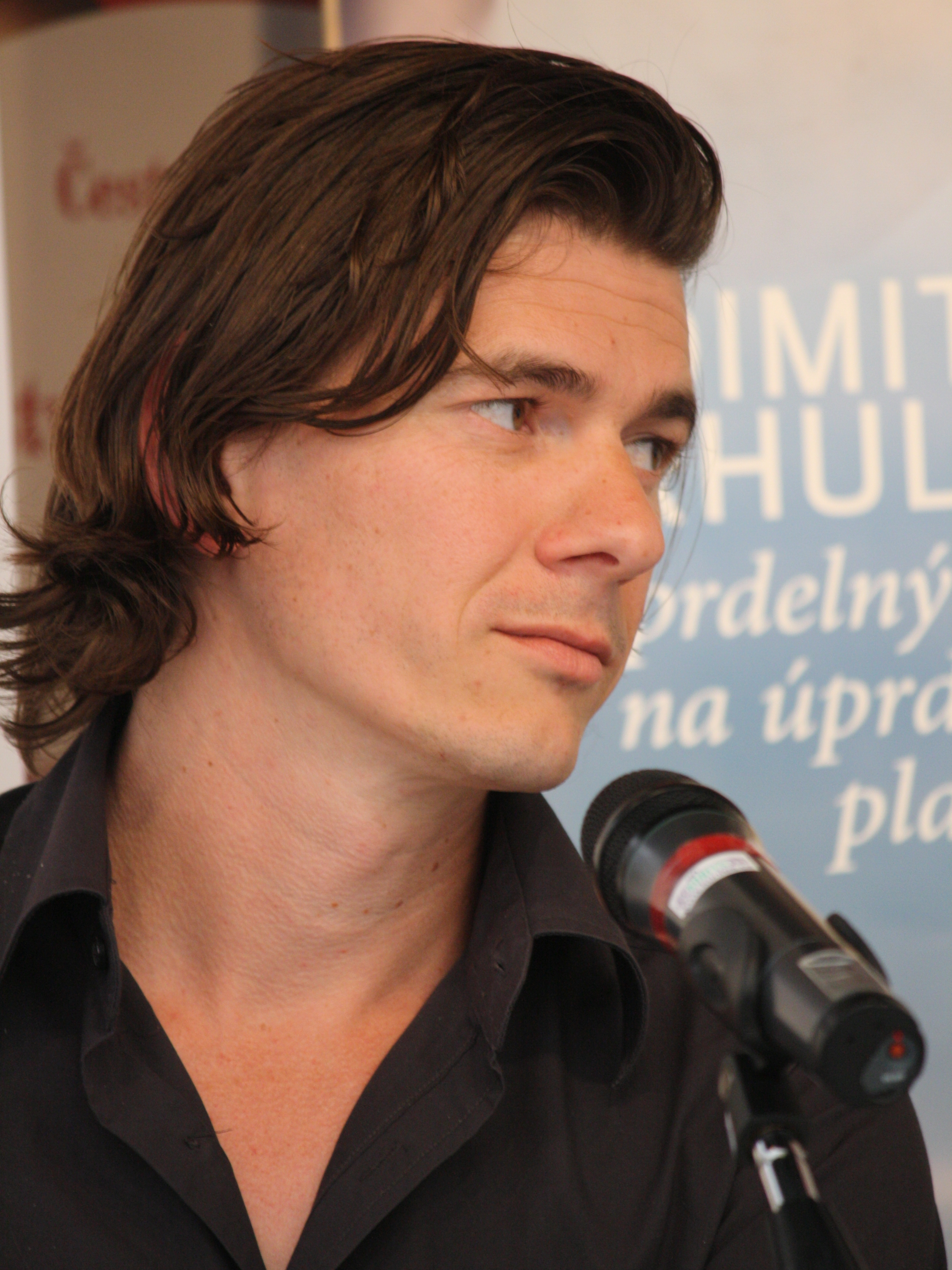
- Dimitri Verhulst
- Born: 2 October 1972 (age 53); Aalst, Belgium
- Occupations: poet, writer

Dimitri Verhulst (born 2 October 1972) is a Belgian writer and poet. He is best known for his novels Problemski Hotel and The Misfortunates.

== Biography ==
Verhulst was an unwanted child in a violent home and spent his later childhood in a foster home and a family replacing home. He grew up Catholic. As a writer, he made his debut in 1994 with the self-published Assevrijdag. In 1999 his first official publication appeared, a collection of stories about his youth, De kamer hiernaast, for which he was nominated for the NRC Literair Prijs. The novel Niets, niemand en redelijk stil (2000) is also about his youth, but De verveling van de keeper (2002) signals a change in form and is characterized by great social and political involvement. In 2001, Verhulst published Liefde, tenzij anders vermeld, a collection of poetry.

His breakthrough to the general public was in 2003, with Problemski Hotel (translated as Problemski Hotel), about residents of an asylum-seekers' centre in Arendonk (Belgium). The book was translated into more than ten languages. Belgian filmmaker Manu Riche made a movie based on the book, which is to premiere in January 2016. In 2006 his novel De helaasheid der dingen (translated as The Misfortunates) was published, and also the novella Mevrouw Verona daalt de heuvel af (translated as Madame Verona Comes Down the Hill). In 2008, Godverdomse dagen op een godverdomse bol ("Goddamn days on a goddamn globe") was published, for which Verhulst won the 2009 Libris Prize; Verhulst wrote the 2015 Boekenweekgeschenk, De zomer hou je ook niet tegen. His 2015 novel Bloedboek ("Bloodbook"), a retelling of the Pentateuch, was praised in De Morgen for its amusement value; in the Dutch daily Trouw it was called a "gruesome bible", with the interviewer questioning Verhulst about his use of terms such as "Final solution" in retelling the first five books of the bible. Verhulst responded that he used the "worldwide language of genocide".

Verhulst publishes on a regular basis in the literary journals Underground, Nieuw Wereldtijdschrift and De Brakke Hond. For Underground he is also an editor. He lives and works in Huccorgne.

== Writing style ==
Verhulst's writing style has been characterized as sarcastic but compassionate. His use of language can be explicit and hilarious. Belgian writer Louis Paul Boon is a source of inspiration for Verhulst.

His writing is controversial, and Verhulst was twice summoned to court.

== Controversy ==
On 27 July 2019, Verhulst published a newspaper column in the Belgian daily De Morgen about Palestinian modern literature. In this column by Verhulst, he claimed to quote Serge Gainsbourg writing that: " "Jood-zijn is geen godsdienst; er is geen enkele God die Zijn schepsels zo’n lelijke neus zou geven." (Translated: "Being Jewish is not a religion; there is no God who would give His creatures such an ugly nose.") According to The Times of Israel, this was not Gainsbourgs original quote and Verhulst accused Israeli Jews of various crimes in his columns. The Times of Israel stated the Forum of Jewish Organizations of Belgium's Flemish region accused Verhulst of expressing “rabid anti-Semitism” in his column and the Dutch Chief Rabbi Binyomin Jacobs called the column “pure anti-Semitism."

The Forum of Jewish Organizations has withdrawn its decision to file criminal charges against writer and columnist Dimitri Verhulst. The Jewish umbrella organization announced this in a press release.

Published 7 October 2019 in a.o. Knack, De Standaard, VRT

== Bibliography ==
- Assevrijdag (1994)
- De kamer hiernaast (1999)
- Niets, niemand en redelijk stil (2001)
- Liefde, tenzij anders vermeld (2001, poetry)
- De verveling van de keeper (2002)
- Problemski Hotel (2003)
- Dinsdagland (2004)
- De aankomst in de bleke morgen op dat bleke plein (Aalst) (2005, play)
- Yerma vraagt een toefeling (2005, translation of Yerma by Federico García Lorca)
- Boekendiefstal is een zegen voor de middenstand (2005)
- De helaasheid der dingen (2006, The Misfortunates; there is also a 2009 film version called The Misfortunates)
- Mevrouw Verona daalt de heuvel af (2006, Madame Verona Comes Down the Hill)
- Godverdomse dagen op een godverdomse bol (2008)
- De laatste liefde van mijn moeder (2010)
- De zeven laatste zinnen (2010)
- Monoloog van iemand die het gewoon werd tegen zichzelf te praten (2011)
- De intrede van Christus in Brussel (2011, Entry of Christ into Brussels)
- De laatkomer (2013)
- Kaddisj voor een kut (2014)
- Bloedboek (2015)
- De zomer hou je ook niet tegen (2015, Boekenweekgeschenk)
- Het leven gezien van beneden (2016)
- Spoo Pee Doo (2016)
- Stoppen met roken in 87 gedichten (2017)
- De pruimenpluk (2019)
- Hebben en zijn (2022)

== Awards ==
- Publieksprijs Gouden Uil for De helaasheid der dingen (2007)
- De Inktaap for De helaasheid der dingen (2008)
- Beste Boek 2008 HUMO's Pop Poll for Godverdomse dagen op een godverdomse bol (2009)
- Libris Literatuurprijs for Godverdomse dagen op een godverdomse bol (2009)

== See also ==
- Flemish literature
