= Johan Heldenbergh =

Belgian actor

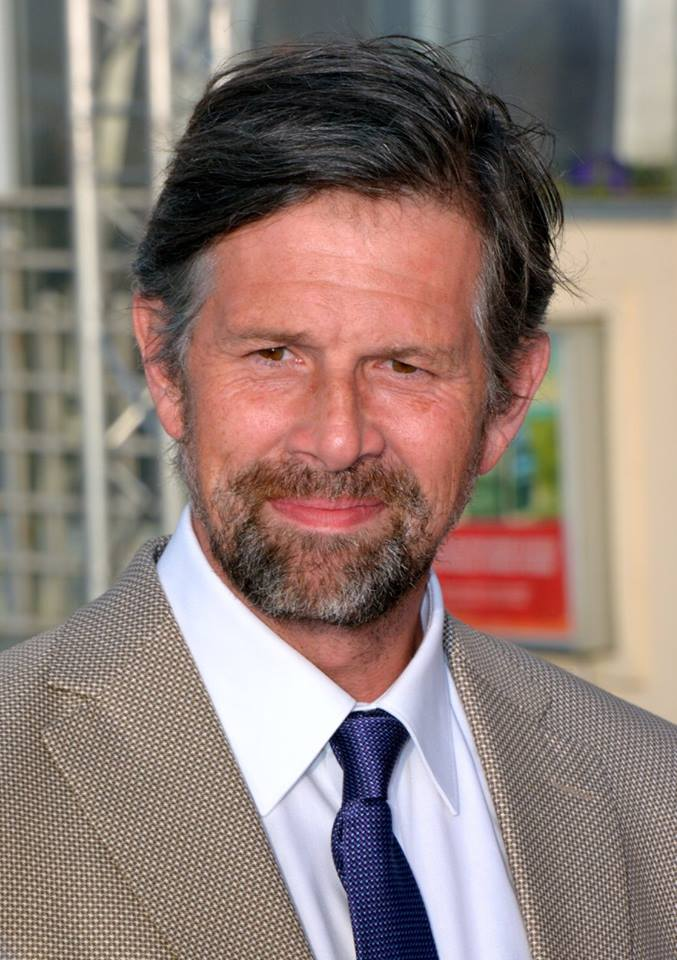
- Born: 9 February 1967 (age 59); Wilrijk, Flemish Region, Belgium
- Education: Studio Herman Teirlinck
- Occupations: Actor, Playwright, Screenwriter, Theatre director, Film director
- Children: 3

Johan Heldenbergh (born 9 February 1967) is a Belgian actor, playwright, screenwriter, theatre director and film director. He gained international fame by starring in films, including A Day in a Life (2007), Moscow, Belgium (2008), The Misfortunates (2009), The Broken Circle Breakdown (2012) and The Zookeeper's Wife (2017).

== Personal life ==
For 19 years he lived together with the Flemish actress Joke Devynck in Hofstade in Aalst, Belgium. On 17 September 2013 it became public that both actors separated. They have three children; two are twins.

== Filmography ==
=== Film ===
- Antonia (1995) - Tom
- She Will Be Mine (1998, short)
- Any Way the Wind Blows (2003) - Schoesetters
- Steve + Sky (2004) - Jean Claude
- My Bonnie (2004, short) - Pascal
- Vleugels (2006)
- Ben X (2007) - religion teacher
- Aanrijding in Moscou (Moscow, Belgium) (2008) - Werner
- De helaasheid der dingen (The Misfortunates) (2009) - uncle Breejen
- Badpakje 46 (2010) - Pascal
- Schellebelle 1919 (2011) - scenarist and director.
- Hasta la vista (Come as You Are) (2011)
- The Broken Circle Breakdown (2012) - Didier
- Through the Air (2015) - Renaud
- The Confessions (2016)
- The Zookeeper's Wife (2017)
- The Hummingbird Project (2018)
- Quo Vadis, Aida? (2020) - Colonel Thom Karremans
- Amal (2023)

=== Television ===
- Souvenirs D'Anvers (1994)
- Ons geluk (1995) - René Hox
- Flikken (2000) - Rik
- Recht op Recht (2001) - Joris Aerts
- Liefde & geluk (2001) - Police officer
- Team Spirit - the series II (2005) - Referee
- Gezocht: Man (2005)
- Selected shorts (2005)
- Witse (2006) - Dirk Desmet
- Jes (television series) (2009) - John Gillis
- De Ronde (2011) - Peter Willemyns
- De Ridder (2013) - John Wouters
- Vermist V (2014) -
- The Tunnel: Sabotage (2016) - Robert Fournier

== Theatre ==
Together with Arne Sierens Heldenbergh forms the initiative Compagnie Cecilia (founded in 2006).

- Massis the musical (2003) (actor)
- Maria Eeuwigdurende Bijstand (2005)
- Trouwfeesten en processen (2006)
- Broeders van liefde (2008)
- The broken circle breakdown featuring the cover-ups of Alabama (2008) (actor together with Mieke Dobbels)
- Vorst/Forest
- De Pijnders
- Duikvlucht (co-actor and coach)
- Giovanni (actor)
- Vallende sterren (actor)
