= LouisLouise =

Belgian Dutch-language telenovela

- Created by: Serge Bierset, Stefaan Werbrouck
- Starring: Hilde De Baerdemaeker; Ianka Fleerackers; Bieke Ilegems; Roel Vanderstukken
- Opening theme: "Man, I Feel Like a Woman" – Udo
- Country of origin: Belgium
- Original language: Dutch
- No. of episodes: 200

Production
- Producer: Studio-A
- Production locations: Ghent, Belgium
- Running time: 25 min (approx. 22 min)

Original release
- Network: VTM
- Release: 24 September 2008 – 25 June 2009

Related
- Remake of Lalola

LouisLouise is a Flemish soap opera based on the Argentine success Lalola format and has been broadcast since 24 September 2008 on vtm. It is the successor of the series Sara.

== Story ==
Louis (Axel Daeseleire) is a successful editor of the men's magazine Don. He feels like he is the boss of the universe, until he bumps into Eva (Véronique Leysen). He convinces her into sleeping with him, dumps her and then continues his life. Eva can't accept this, and asks her best friend, Babs (Lotte Mariën) for advice. She speaks an occult curse on him, not aware that on this night, a special cosmic constellation of planets takes place. That night, Louis is transformed into a woman. When he wakes up, he panics. His roommate and best friend, Charlotte De Wilde (Ianka Fleerackers), convinces him to go to the editors disguised as Louise, the niece of Louis, and do a very important presentation for investors of Uitgeverij Hercules, the company behind the magazine Don.

When his boss, Vic Mutsaerts (Rudy Morren), tries to call Louis, he is surprised to get Charlotte on the line instead. She quickly lies and says that Louis had to leave for his sick father in Canada, and that his cousin and confidant Louise will lead the meeting.

Louis has to go through life as a woman now. Louise (Hilde De Baerdemaeker) turns out to be a beautiful woman and finds out what it's like to be a woman in modern society. Louis faces that Louise is not often taken seriously and doesn't know what to do. Charlotte introduces Louise to the world of women, with little success. Tasks such as walking on high heels and forgetting about her manly principles seem impossible. By trial and error, she learns the disadvantages of women, but also the benefits. Louis then has to make a decision of staying a woman or changing back to a man, which is made difficult by the fact that his Louise ego has fallen in love with a man.

Everyone was impressed with Louise's performance, especially art director Thomas ( Roel Vanderstukken ). He seems to have a thing for her, but as a true macho, Louise is naturally disgusted by the idea. She therefore handles pushy men in her own tough and "masculine" way. Meanwhile, Vic discusses Louis's sudden departure with the staff. Everyone believes Louise is the right person to replace him, except Bruno Sels ( Werner De Smedt ), Louis's best friend who is now eyeing his position. As Louis's right-hand man, he believes he's the best person to fill the position. He's convinced that with a little "sweet-talk" with his colleagues, they'll choose him. In that case, restructuring would take place, and everyone gradually begins to dream of a promotion.

The rest of the editorial team consists of Kaat Coucke ( An Vanderstighelen ), a woman who suffers from an inferiority complex and does everything she can to compensate for the lack of male attention, Patrick Maes ( Steve Geerts ), a rather insecure boy who constantly tries to seduce women but often ends up in the wrong hands and is seen as a macho by them. The beautiful Anouk Van Hove ( Bieke Ilegems ) is Bruno's assistant in bullying Louise out. He is also helped by Nathalie Mutsaerts ( Eline De Munck ), the beautiful daughter of boss Vic who wants to take over Kaat's position but is mainly after Thomas, and the new errand boy Nico Messiaen ( Matteo Simoni ), a free spirit who is suspected of theft.

Finally, there's the friendly receptionist/secretary/coffee girl Jana Pattyn ( Kim Hertogs ) and Claudia Beel ( Elke Dom ), owner of Hercules publishing house and majority shareholder of Don . Her husband Vic is Don 's manager and is therefore dominated in every aspect of their relationship. Theo Vynckier ( Manou Kersting ) is a Dutch investor who, at every opportunity, interferes with the editorial staff of the men's magazine.

Charlotte, Louis's childhood friend and roommate, is a radio presenter for Hart op de tong (Heart on the Tongue ), a program on Radio Bavo owned by her ex-boyfriend Maarten Stevens ( Herbert Bruynseels ), who still pursues her as if she were his property. Another colleague is Jasper De Roeck ( Ward Kerremans ), better known as "DJ Elvis," a mysterious boy who is happy to help Charlotte and doesn't ask any questions. .

== Casting ==
Acteur	Personage	Job	Extra
Hilde De Baerdemaeker	Louise De Roover	Editor-in-Chief	Man in woman's (Inge Hermans) body In love with Thomas; Ending: She marries Thomas and has a child with him.
Roel Vanderstukken	Thomas Lesaffer	Art director	In love with Louise; Father of Femke; Ending: He marries Louise and has a child with her.
Ianka Fleerackers	Charlotte De Wilde	Radio Presenter	Ex-girlfriend of Maarten; In love with Vic (ex-boyfriend); In love with Jeroen (Louis' body); Ending: She gets engaged to Jeroen and gets pregnant by him.
Rudy Morren	Vic Mutsaerts	General Manager	Claudia's ex Charlotte's ex-boyfriend Natalie's father Natalie's father Ending: He gets back together with Claudia and they retire together
Werner De Smedt	Bruno Sels	Human Resources Manager	Has Louise-phobia; Ending: He is locked up in a mental institution.
Eline De Munck	Natalie Mutsaerts	Editorial Assistant	Daughter of Theo and Claudia; In love with Thomas; Ending: After an unconscious curse from Claudia, she transforms into a frog and has since lived as a Frog.
Bieke Ilegems	Anouk Van Hove	Sales Manager	Has an on-again, off-again relationship with Bruno; Ending: She gets a boyfriend and becomes General Manager of Hercules.
Elke Dom	Claudia Mutsaerts-Beel	Owner of Uitgeverij Hercules Publishing	Vic's ex Natalie's mother Ending: She gets back together with Vic and they retire together.
An Vanderstighelen	Kaat Coucke	Fashion & Showbiz Editor	Engaged to Patrick; Ending: She is expecting a child with Patrick.
Steve Geerts	Patrick Maes	Lifestyle & Sports Editor	Engaged to Kaat; Ending: He becomes a football coach for the youth of AA GENT and is expecting a child with Kaat.
Matteo Simoni	Nico Messiaen	Courier	In love with Jana (ex-boyfriend); Ending: He gets back together with Jana and makes a game show together.
Ward Kerremans	Jasper 'Elvis' De Roeck	Radio Technician	DJ Elvis; In Love With Jana (Ex-Lover); Ending: He meets the girl of his dreams, a female computer nerd.
Kim Hertogs	Jana Pattyn	Administration Manager / Receptionist	In love with Nico (ex-boyfriend); In love with Elvis (ex-boyfriend); Ending: She gets back together with Nico and becomes a game show host.
Manou Kersting	Theo Vynckier	Investor / Head of High Five	Ex-lover of Claudia; Biological father of Natalie; Ending: He loses all his power with Hercules and returns to the Netherlands.
Herbert Bruynseels	Maarten Stevens	Radio Bravo Network Manager	Ex-boyfriend of Charlotte Ending: He leaves for abroad after receiving an offer to teach mindfulness there.
Evi Vermandere	Femke Lesaffer	going to school	Daughter of Thomas and Sofie Ending: becomes a big sister of Louise and Thomas's first child.
Janne Desmet	Iris	Housekeeper	Works for Thomas
Axel Daeseleire	Louis De Roover/Jeroen	(Former) editor-in-chief	Louis: changes into Louise; Jeroen: Inge into Louis's body In love with Charlotte; Ending: He gets engaged to Charlotte and is expecting a child with her.

=== Guest Characters ===
Acteur	Personage	Job	Extra	Einde
Véronique Leysen	Eva	Model	One-night stand Louis	1: After the transformation, she leaves on a world trip. 2: Leaves back because she couldn't do anything for Louise.
Lotte Mariën	Babs	Fortune Teller	Best friend of Eva	After she showed Bruno the door, she disappeared from view.
Bram Kwekkeboom	Harold Verheyen	(Former) Head of Investor Group	(Former) Head of Investor Group	1: Leaves back to Amsterdam 2: Deceased
Francesca Vanthielen	Sonja	Human Resources Manager (High Five)	In love with Louise	Leaves back to the Netherlands because her work is done and Louise does not reciprocate her love.
Veerle Dobbelaere	Monica Claeys	(Executive) Secretary	Claudia's spy	Disappears from view after her dismissal
Han Coucke	Mattias	Director	(Ex-)boyfriend of Nathalie	He doesn't accept his child with Nathalie and leaves.
Priske Dehandschutter	Isabel	Cleaning lady	Bruno's spy	Is summarily fired by Charlotte after discovering her espionage.
George Arrendell	Gigi	Model for DON among others	Homosexual	Left after his evening with Harold.
Anne Denolf	Sofie Maertens	/	Thomas's ex, Femke's mother	Back to a psychiatric institution after they tried to kill Femke and herself.
Tineke Caels	Liesje Verdonck	Secretary	/	1: Fired by Kaat 2: Disappears from view after being used by Louise to charm Bruno.
Ben Segers	Sven Calmijn	Director of cleaning company SupraClean	Inge's fiancé (body of Louise)	Disappears from view because Louise doesn't want anything to do with him anymore.
Anke Helsen	Gina Van Maele	Cleaning lady	Mother of Inge (body Louise)	Disappears from view and still has contact with Louise by phone.
Sofie Truyen	Maaike Vankerckhove	Model		Disappears from view after she withdraws her complaint against Thomas.
Julie Borgmans	Elke Vandermeersch	/	Daughter of Vandermeersch (boss of Mensworld)	Leaves after her relationship with Nico breaks down.
Ludo Hellinx	Jozef Coucke	/	Father of Kaat	Disappears from view after giving his victory for Kaat and Patrick's wedding.
Marijke Pinoy	Mia Coucke	/	Mother of Kaat	Disappears from view after she gives her victory for Kaat and Patrick's wedding.
