= Marc Van Eeghem =

Belgian actor (1960–2017)

- Marc van Eeghem in 2013
- Born: 14 December 1960; Zeebrugge, Belgium
- Died: December 14, 2017 (aged 57); Brugge, Belgium

Marc Van Eeghem (14 September 1960 – 14 December 2017) was a Belgian actor.

== Career ==
=== Theatre ===
Van Eeghem studied acting at the Studio Herman Teirlinck until 1983. That year marked the start of a career in theater, in addition to roles in feature films and television series. In the theater he played for the Flemish and Dutch companies Arca, De Tijd, Het Zuidelijk Toneel, Toneelhuis, DAS theater and 't Arsenaal. He made his name in productions such as The Man Without Qualities, Desperado, Hamlet vs Hamlet, The Blind, Maria Stuart and Passions Humaines.

=== Movie and television work ===
Marc Van Eeghem became popular with his television work. He has appeared in many series in the nineties and noughties on the Flemish broadcasters VRT and VTM. His work is described as showing commitment and conviction, strength and talent.

Van Eeghem had leading roles in series like Ons geluk, Return to Oosterdonk, De Parelvissers, Matroesjka's, Katarakt, De Ronde, The Divine Monster, Windkracht 10 and Tytgat Chocolat. He had countless guest roles in series like Witse, Code 37, Zone Stad, Heterdaad or Flikken.

In the cinema, Van Eeghem was seen in Wildschut, The van Paemel Family, Daens and Hector, among others.

== Personal life ==
Born in Bruges, he had four siblings, including presenter Kurt Van Eeghem.

Shortly after Van Eeghem married the mother of his children, he died on 14 December 2017, aged 57, from prostate cancer. He had been diagnosed seven years earlier and had stopped his chemotherapy in October.

== Selected filmography ==
- The van Paemel Family (1986)
- Hector (1987)
- Daens (1992)
- Kulderzipken (1995)
- Ons geluk (1995–1996)
- Russian Dolls: Sex Trade (2005–2006)
- Kiss Me Softly (Kus me zachtjes) (2012)
