= Ons geluk =

Belgian Dutch-language drama TV series

- Genre: Drama
- Based on: Ons geluk by Gerard Walschap
- Written by: Paul Koeck, Guido De Craene
- Directed by: Serge Leurs, Frank van Mechelen
- Starring: Johan Heldenbergh
- Country of origin: Belgium
- Original language: Dutch
- No. of episodes: 26

Production
- Producer: Studio-A
- Production locations: Brabant, Belgium
- Running time: 55 min

Original release
- Network: VTM
- Release: 1995 – 1996

Ons geluk (Our Happiness) is a Flemish television series made by Belgian channel vtm from 1995–1996. The series is based on novels by Gerard Walschap. The scenario was written by Paul Koeck. It was the most expensive Belgian series at that time with a budget of 400 million Belgian francs (approx. €9.9 million). The series had a cast of over 140 persons and was shot in a two-year timeframe. 26 episodes were aired.

== Plot ==
The series is set in the fictitious Belgian town of Lagerzeel in the province of Brabant during the 1950s. Door Onckeloms, a local brewer, has trouble with his son. He is studying at the university in Leuven but is not very interested. Réne Hox, son of clochards Tist and Trien, is asked by Door to keep an eye on him and offers him money to take courses at the university.

== Cast ==
- Johan Heldenbergh as René Hox
- Veerle Dobbelaere as Leontien Hox-Verstraeten
- Pascale Michiels as Vera Muys-Eetvelt
- Marc Van Eeghem as Tor Muys
- Tom Van Bauwel as Cell Muys
- Ianka Fleerackers as Céline
- Tuur De Weert as Door Onckeloms
- Nand Buyl as Tist Hox
- Chris Lomme as Trien Hox
- Michel Van Dousselaere as Frank Rottiers
- Tania Poppe as Suzanne D'Hert
- Hilde Uitterlinden as Mieke
- Tessy Moerenhout as Maria Onckeloms
- François Beukelaers as Dr Floren
- Greta Van Langendonck as Nel Muys
- Daan Hugaert as Michel
- Charles Cornette as Pastor
- Fred Van Kuyk as Muys
- Rosemarie Bergmans as Adèle Witten-D'Hert
- Martin Van Zundert as Meneer Verstraeten
- Blanka Heirman as Miss Verstraeten
- Maria Verdi as Martine
- Alex Cassiers as Benoît
- Gert Lahousse as Dr Priestman
- Tine Van den Brande as Reine Priestman
- Fania Sorel as Mie Muys-Zaterdag
- Hilde Breda as Alfonsine
- Pierre Callens as Paul Hillegeers
- Nicole Persy as Irma Rottiers
- Netty Vangheel as Rosalie
- Marc Janssen as Witten D'Hert
- Luc Springuel as Pastor Etienne Cogels
- Wim Stevens as Han Dens
- André Van Daele as Susken Eetvelt
- Gerda Lindekens as Sidonie
- Hilt De Vos as Denise Lepla
- Lieve Moorthamer as Mrs Peeters
- Herman Coessens as Mr Peeters
- Steven De Schepper as Theo Roeckx
- Rudy Morren as Jozef Dens
- Alice Toen as Ruth Dens
- Magda Cnudde as Alice Manke
- Jos Van Gorp as Father Dens
- Jan Van Hecke as Jozef Onckeloms
- Jan Decleir as Sooi Zaterdag
- Miek De Schepper as Mother Superior
- Dimitri Dupont as Doctor
- Nicky Langley as Mother Superior
- Lisette Mertens as Sister
- Peter Michel as Jos
- Pol Pauwels as Frits
- Chris Thys as Elza
- Daniela Bisconti as Eugenie
- Robert Borremans as notary De Clerck
- Mathias Sercu as Jean Witten
- Ann Ceurvels as Elvire Stappaerts
- Axel Daeseleire
- Hugo Danckaert as Mr Lepla
- Koen De Bouw
- Geert Hunaerts
- Eric Kerremans
- Peter Michiels
- Bart Slegers
- Margot De Ridder as Liesje
- Arnout Verhoeve as Sooike
- Imogen Ott as baby Liesje

== Episodes ==
=== Season 1 (1995) ===
1. De pleegouders (The foster parents)
2. De eikel (The acorn)
3. De cantate (The cantata)
4. De opvolger (The successor)
5. De briefwisseling (The letter exchange)
6. Het afscheid (Farewell)
7. De Française (The Frenchwoman)
8. De uitnodiging (The invitation)
9. Alfonsine (Alfonsine)
10. Cell (Cell)
11. Kinderen (Children)
12. De bedreiging (The threat)
13. De beslissing (The decision)

=== Season 2 (1996) ===
1. Denise (Denise)
2. De Kwade Slag (The bad move)
3. De Kentering (The turn)
4. De Beloftes (The promises)
5. De Bedevaart (The pilgrim)
6. De Verloren Zoon (The lost son)
7. Liesje (Liesje)
8. Engeland (England)
9. Intriges (Intrigues)
10. Gaan en Komen (Come and go)
11. De Advertentie (The advertisement)
12. De Tweestrijd (The internal conflict)
13. Andere Tijden (Other times)
