= Cyriel Buysse =

Flemish naturalist author and playwright

Cyriel Bussye
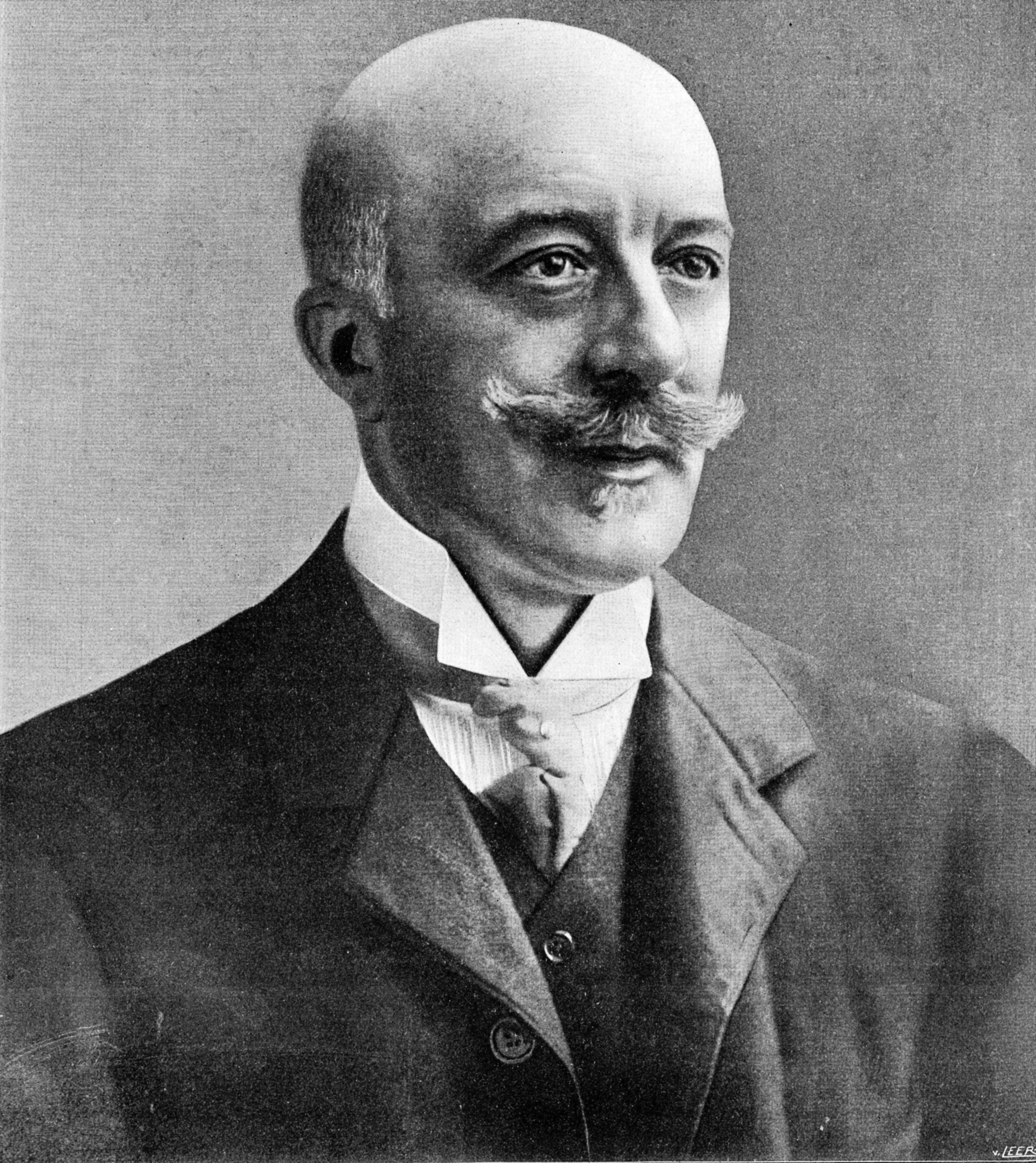
- Cyriel Buysse
- Born: Cyrillus Gustave Emile Buysse; 20 September 1859; Nevele, Belgium
- Died: 25 July 1932 (aged 72); Afsnee, Belgium
- Occupations: author, naturalist, playwright

Cyrillus Gustave Emile "Cyriel" Buysse (pronounced [siˈril ˈbœysə]; 20 September 1859 – 25 July 1932) was a Flemish naturalist author and playwright. He also wrote under the following pseudonyms: Louis Bonheyden, Prosper Van Hove and Robert Palmer.

== Biography ==
Buysse was born on 20 September 1859 in Nevele, Belgium in a well-to-do family. Before he could complete his studies at the Atheneum in Ghent, he joined the family's chicory factory at the request of his father.

At the suggestion of his aunt Virginie Loveling, herself an author, he started writing when he was twenty-six. When his father found out that he was dating a girl he had met in a local bar, he was told to leave the ancestral home. Between 1886 and 1896 he emigrated to the United States several times, but he returned more disillusioned each time. The written account of his travels is known as Twee Herinneringen uit Amerika (Two memories from America), written in 1888.

Buysse became known as a naturalist writer in the tradition of Stijn Streuvels, Émile Zola and Guy de Maupassant. Although he had been educated in French, which was common for sons of wealthy Flemish families in that era, most of his work would be in Dutch. His writing is characterised by a deep sympathy for the common man, whose life he vividly and realistically describes.

In 1893 he co-edited the literary periodical Van Nu en Straks (On Now and Soon) together with Prosper Van Langendonck, August Vermeylen en Emmanuel De Bom, but left soon afterwards following an argument. In the same year, he wrote his first novel Het recht van den sterkste (The Law of the Jungle).

Buysse married the Dutch widow Nelly Dyserinck in 1896 and spent winters in The Hague in the Netherlands, where his son René Cyriel was born in 1897, while staying at his rural estate in Afsnee in Belgium during summer.

In 1903, he co-founded another literary magazine, Groot Nederland together with Louis Couperus en Willem Gerard van Nouhuys which he continued to edit until his death.

During the German occupation of Belgium in the first World War, Buysse remained in the Netherlands. He became an active contributor to the newspaper De Vlaamsche Stem (The Flemish Voice). In 1918, after the Armistice, he returned to Belgium where his talent was now widely recognized: he received the state prize for literature in 1921, and became a member of the Koninklijke Vlaamse Academie voor Taal- en Letterkunde (Royal Flemish Academy of Language and Literature) in 1930. In 1932 he was ennobled by King Albert I to the rank of baron, which was then a rare honour for a writer, and ironic given the tone and subject of his books; since he died four days later he was not able to receive the appropriate letters patent and so was unable to use the title. In October 1934 his widow Nelly Dyserinck was ennobled and styled a baroness.

His naturalist play The van Paemel Family (1902) is still being performed regularly. It has also been turned into a movie in 1986.

Buysse died on 25 July 1932 in Afsnee, Belgium.

== Bibliography ==
=== Books ===
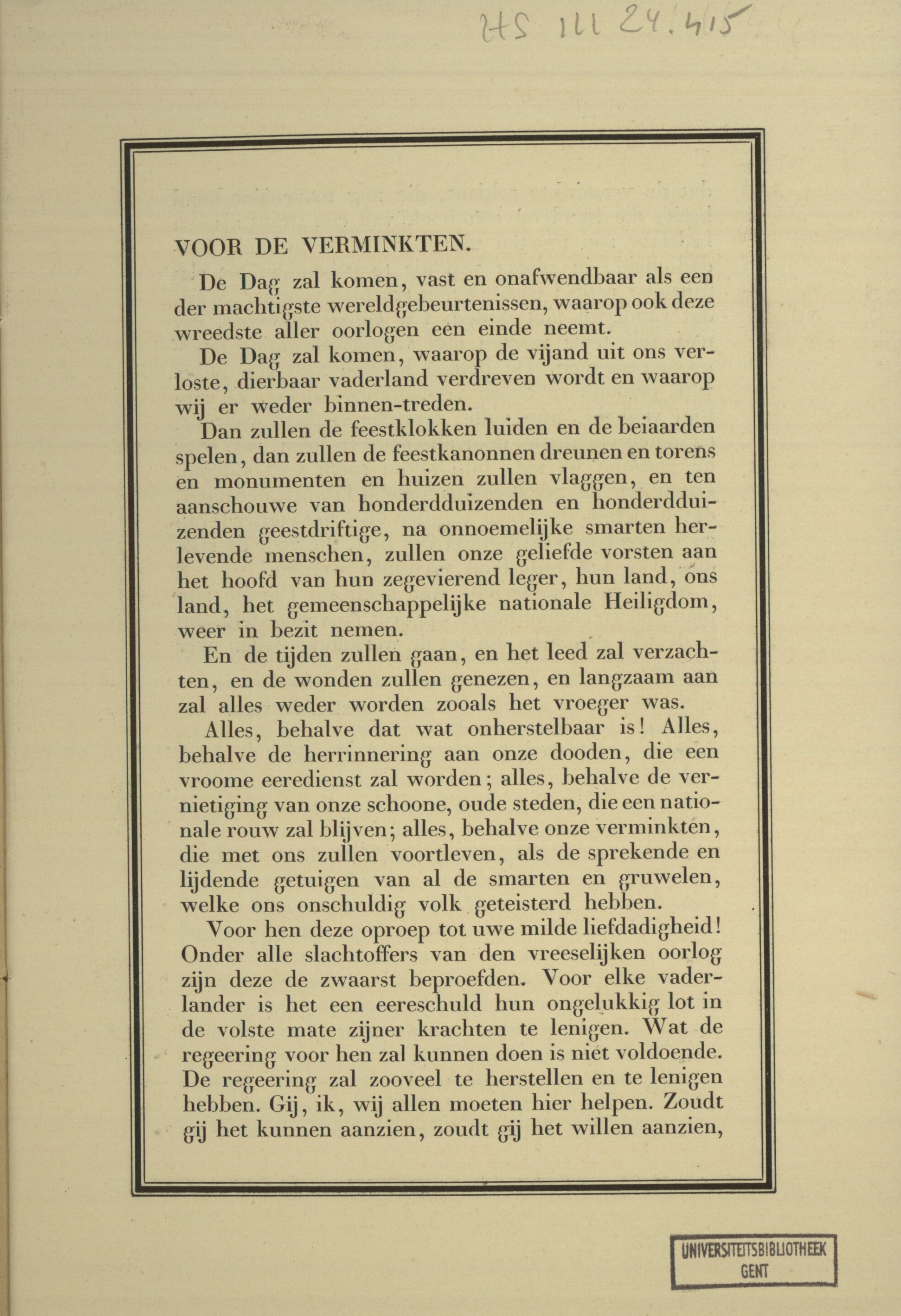
- Excerpt from the book "Le sou du mutilé". Written by Cyriel Buysse in the beginning of the 20th century.
  Guusje en Zieneken (1887)
- Twee herinneringen uit Amerika (1888)
- Beter laat dan nooit (1891)
- Het huwelijk van neef Perseyn (1893)
- Het recht van den sterkste (novel 1893)
- De biezenstekker (1894)
- Sursum corda! (1894)
- Wroeging (1895)
- Mea culpa (1896)
- Op 't Blauwhuis (novel 1897)
- De zwarte kost (1898)
- Schoppenboer (novel 1898)
- Uit Vlaanderen (essays 1899)
- Te lande (bundel 1900)
- Een Leeuw van Vlaanderen (1900)
- Van arme menschen (1901)
- Daarna (1903)
- Aan 't strand (1903)
- Tusschen Leie en Schelde (essays 1904)
- In de natuur (bundel 1905)
- Het Verdriet van meneer Ongena (1906)
- Het leven van Rozeke van Daelen (novel 1906)
- Het Bolleken (novel 1906)
- Lente (essays 1907)
- Het volle leven (novel 1908)
- Ik Herinner mij (essays 1909)
- De eenzame (1909)
- Het "ezelken", wat niet vergeten was (novel 1910)
- De vroolijke tocht (travel essay 1911)
- Stemmingen (essays 1911)
- Levensleer (novel co-authored with Virginie Loveling 1911)
- De nachtelijke aanranding (novel 1912)
- Le Sou de mutilé (Voor de verminkten) (1910's)
- Per auto (travel essay 1913)
- Van hoog en laag (essays 1913)
- Oorlogsvizioenen (essays 1915)
- Zomerleven (1915)
- Een vroolijk drietal (essays 1916)
- Van een verloren zomer (1917)
- De roman van den schaatsenrijder (1918)
- De strijd (1918)
- De twee pony's (essays 1919)
- Plus-que-parfait (novel 1919)
- Zooals het was... (novel 1921)
- Uit de bron (bundel 1922)
- De Laatste Ronde (travel essay 1923)
- Tantes (novel 1924) (translated by David McKay as The Aunts, 2020, ISBN 978-1645250548)
- Typen (1925)
- Uleken (novel 1926)
- Kerels (essays 1927)
- Dierenliefde (essays 1928)
- De schandpaal (essays 1928)
- Wat wij in Spanje en Marokko zagen (essays 1929)
- Uit het leven (short stories 1930)
- Twee werelden (1931)
- Rivièra-impressies (travel essays 1932)
- Verzameld werk (7 volumes) (1974–1982)

=== Plays ===
- De plaatsvervangende vrederechter (1895)
- Driekoningenavond (1899)
- Maria (1900)
- Het gezin van Paemel (1903)
- De landverhuizers (1904)
- De sociale misdaad (1904)
- Se non é vero... (1905)
- Het recht (1908)
- Sususususut (1921)
- Jan Bron (1921)

=== Movies ===
- Het gezin van Paemel was filmed for television in 1986 (director: Paul Cammermans, script: Hugo Claus en Jan Blokker)

== See also ==
- Flemish literature

== Sources ==
- Elslander, A. van. 1974. 'Inleiding'. In: Cyriel Buysse. Verzameld Werk. Brussel: A. Manteau
- Marc Galle. 1966. Cyriel Buysse. Brugge: Desclée de Brouwer.
