= Herman Coessens =

Belgian actor (1943–2023)

- Born: 22 August 1943; Aalst, Belgium
- Died: 9 January 2023 (aged 79)
- Occupation: Actor

Herman Coessens (22 August 1943 – 9 January 2023) was a Belgian actor.

Coessens was most known as a stage actor at Nederlands Toneel Gent where he played between the 1970s and 1990s. Coessens also played in many television series, including De bossen van Vlaanderen, Wat nu weer?!, Ons geluk, Het Veenmysterie, Daar is een mens verdronken and Flikken.

Coessens was married to actress Lieve Moorthamer. He died on 9 January 2023, at the age of 79.
