= Daeseleire =

Daeseleire is a surname. Notable people with the surname include:

- Axel Daeseleire (born 1968), Belgian actor
- Dimitri Daeseleire (born 1990), Belgian footballer
