= The van Paemel Family =

Het Gezin van Paemel
- Theatrical release poster
- Directed by: Paul Cammermans
- Written by: Jan Blokker
- Starring: Senne Rouffaer; Marc Van Eeghem; Jan Decleir; Chris Boni
- Distributed by: made for television
- Release date: 1986
- Running time: 90 minutes
- Country: Belgium
- Language: Dutch

The van Paemel Family (Dutch: Het gezin van Paemel) is a 1986 Belgian historic drama directed by Paul Cammermans, based on a play written by Cyriel Buysse. The film received the André Cavens Award for Best Film by the Belgian Film Critics Association (UCC). It was also entered into the 15th Moscow International Film Festival.

== Cast ==
- Senne Rouffaer as Mr. van Paemel, the patriarch
- Chris Boni as Mrs. van Paemel, his wife
- Marijke Pinoy as Romanie van Paemel, the youngest daughter
- Jos Verbist as Désiré van Paemel, a son
- Marc Van Eeghem as Kamiel van Paemel, a son
- Ronny Waterschoot as Eduard van Paemel, the oldest son

== Plot ==
The family patriarch Van Paemel is a farmer on baron de Wilde's estate. His mild-mannered son Désire is accidentally shot during a hunting party on the estate and remains an invalid. Eduard, the eldest son, is a member of the socialist workers' movement and involved in strike actions in the city. Against her father's wishes, his daughter Cordule starts an affair with the poacher Masco. His youngest daughter, Romanie, is forced to work as a domestic servant at the castle, where she is seduced by Maurice, the baron's son and heir, and becomes pregnant. When the youngest son Kamiel also has to leave the farm because he is drafted into the army, the lack of workers on Van Paemel's farm becomes critical. As a result, the family is evicted from their home because they cannot pay the rent. Three of the children emigrate to the US, one becomes a nun and one dies, until only the farmer and his wife remain.
