= Kulderzipken =

Flemish television series

- Series DVD cover
- Genre: Youth series, fairytale
- Created by: Hugo Matthysen
- Theme music composer: Jean Blaute
- Country of origin: Belgium
- Original language: Dutch
- No. of seasons: 2
- No. of episodes: 20

Production
- Running time: 30 minutes

Original release
- Network: Ketnet
- Release: 29 October 1995 – 23 February 1997

Kulderzipken is a Flemish television series that premiered in 1995. Two seasons of ten episodes each have been made since then. The final episode aired in 1996.

== Concept ==
Once upon a time there was, in country far, far, far away, a king called Jozef (Jan Decleir), and his wife, queen Angina (Karine Tanghe). King Jozef thought the time was right for his daughter, princess Prieeltje (Ianka Fleerackers), to get married and king Jozef set up a special contest. The first young man to pull the three golden hairs out of Mother Devil's head got the chance to marry the princess.

The contest was won by Kulderzipken (Michael Pas), a simple country lad. Both Prieeltje and her mother are very happy with the outcome, but King Jozef does not want a country lad as his son-in-law, and tries to chase Kulderzipken from his castle. King Jozef gets help from Mother Devil (Veerle Eyckermans), who wanted her son the devil (Frans Van der Aa) to win the contest instead.

Every episode, Kulderzipken has to fulfill a special quest. He gets help from the brothers Grimm (Warre Borgmans and Lucas Van den Eynde/Marc Van Eeghem), two servants in the castle who are very fond of courtesy and add mister in front of every title, even female ones.
