= Gangstas (film) =

2025 film by Adil El Arbi and Bilall Fallah

- Film poster
- Dutch: Patsers
- Directed by: Adil El Arbi; Bilall Fallah
- Written by: Adil El Arbi; Sven Huybrechts; Bram Renders; Ruben Vermeersch
- Produced by: Nabil Ben Yadir; Kobe Van Steenberghe; Hendrik Verthré
- Starring: Matteo Simoni; Nora Gharib; Saïd Boumazoughe; Junes Lazaar
- Cinematography: Maximiliaan Dierickx
- Edited by: Pieter Smet
- Music by: Hannes De Maeyer
- Production companies: A Team Productions; 10.80 Films; Fiction Valley; Los morros
- Distributed by: The Searchers
- Release dates: 19 February 2025 (Belgium & Luxembourg)
- Running time: 119 minutes
- Country: Belgium
- Language: Dutch

Gangstas (Dutch: Patsers) is a 2025 Belgian action crime comedy film directed by Adil El Arbi and Bilall Fallah. It is a sequel to the 2018 film Gangsta. The promotional materials and opening credits display the words "THE 7TH FILM BY ADIL & BILALL", thus skipping the unreleased film Batgirl in the numbering.

== Synopsis ==
Although he now runs a legitimate business, Adamo is still secretly involved in the Antwerp criminal underworld. He becomes a target of Jana, the new boss of the KALI drug task force. When a container of cocaine is seized by the police during transshipment, Adamo is arrested. He bribes a court clerk to shred an indictment summons, enabling his release from jail. His boss Aunt Mounja is upset about the lost shipment, and Adamo insists that another container of cocaine is arriving.

Drug lord Dzjengis Khan, who is in a rivalry with Aunt Mounja, asks Adamo to switch sides and join him. When Adamo refuses, Dzjengis Khan attacks Adamo's friends using car bombs and drive-by shootings. Badia's mother is critically injured in a shooting. Badia, Volt, and Junes agree to work with Adamo against Dzengis Khan. When they end up captured, Adamo tells Dzengis Khan that the cocaine can be recovered through a plot called Operation Everest, which involves infiltrating the waste disposal plant that destroys the drugs. During the operation, Adamo overpowers Dzengis Khan's enforcer Barabas.

In a post-credits scene, Adamo struggles to walk through the container port at night. An x-ray view of his chest shows his heart struggling from zona. Adamo collapses against a fence and onto the ground. A female voice shouts, "Adamo! What the fuck? Adamo!" The screen goes black, then the words "PATSERS WILL BE BACK" appear in neon lettering.

== Cast ==
- Matteo Simoni as Adamo
- Nora Gharib as Badia
- Saïd Boumazoughe as Volt
- Junes Lazaar as Junes
- Pommelien Thijs as Femke Vermaelen
- Jennifer Heylen as Jana
- Ward Kerremans as Barabas
- Ruben van der Meer as Dzjengis Khan
- Louis Talpe as Vincent
- Modou Beye as Papadoudou
- Joes Brauers as Danny
- Soundos El Ahmadi as Aunt Mounja
- Geert Van Rampelberg as Mayor Caster
- Yolanthe Cabau as Evita
- Nawfel Bardad-Daidj as Mohammed Ibrahimi
- Joey Kwan as Kiki
- Jolan De Bouw as Mario
- Greg Timmermans as Lars
- Johan Albert as JC
- Ferre van den Broeck as Tech Police Lize
- Alii Sabedin as Tech police Alex
- Gers Pardoel as Dutch Detective Darius
- Florence Vos Weeda as Dutch Detective Vanessa
- Jeroen Van der Ven as Eduard Verbrugghe
- Tania Kloek as Public Prosecutor Frieda Van Halen
- Safouane Benhaddouch as Soccer Player Ahmed
- Samba Thiam as Soccer Player Dieu
- Ismail L'Hamiti as Jeweler Avi
- Amine Abdelfettah as Sami Cousin 2
- Mehdi Chafi as Ibrahim
- Fares El Bzioui as Fouat Cousin 1
- Milan Swagers as Goon

== Production ==
Joris van der Aa, a crime reporter for the newspaper Gazet van Antwerpen, contributed his knowledge of actual events to the story. He commented, "It is fiction, but it is based on true events. I enjoyed helping to shape the characters and storylines." Adil El Arbi called Joris van der Aa "a living encyclopedia".

In an interview with bruzz.be, Adil El Arbi remarked, "Those seven years have indeed resulted in a harder, darker film. [...] When we were working on the first Patser, not so many articles were published about the drug problem in Antwerp. Now even the international press is talking about Antwerp as the cocaine capital. The atmosphere became grimmer, and that crept into the film."

The film was granted €401,646 in support by the Netherlands Film Production Incentive of 2023.

== Release ==
An advance screening of the film before its official theatrical release was attended by celebrities including Bart De Wever, Prime Minister of Belgium, who wore a thick gold chain with matching bracelet and ring to the premiere. When a reporter remarked about the thick gold chain, he pointed out that he was also wearing a gold ring.

== Box office ==
More than 100,000 people viewed the film within its first 10 days in theaters.

== Reception ==
Reviewer Berend Jan Bockting of De Volkskrant gave the film a rating of 4 out of 5 stars, writing, "The plot of Patsers, the seventh film by the Flemish film duo Adil El Arbi and Bilall Fallah, feels overcrowded, but that does not matter: the film is convincing mainly because of its audiovisual overwhelmingness."

Reviewer Erik Stockman of Humo gave the film a rating of 2 and a half out of 5 stars, writing, "There is no arguing about their virtuoso craftsmanship: Adil & Bilall are probably the best action filmmakers ever to come to fruition in our country. Only: in Patsers the two brothers flatten us with pure film technique, not with storytelling."

Reviewer Ewoud Ceulemans of De Morgen gave the film a rating of 2 out of 5 stars, writing, "Patsers has a lot: popular filmmakers like Adil and Bilall behind the camera, hip celebrities like Pommelien Thijs, Soundos El Ahmadi and Jennifer Heylen in front of it. However, the search for interesting characters, a good storyline or a godforsaken resting point is fruitless."

Reviewer Rose van der Kamp of Het Parool wrote, "The sequel Patsers tells a crime story that is as irresistible as the underworld itself. Although the visual and narrative excess makes the film almost inimitable."

Reviewer Valérie Hoffmann of npo.nl gave the film a rating of 4.5/10, writing, "With Antwerp once again as the battleground of the international coke gangsters, Patsers offers a glimpse into the Flemish underworld. Unfortunately, the plot is not as exciting as the arena where it is set. The grotesque visual effects, unbalanced acting qualities of the cast and an exaggerated focus on action take over." Her review concludes, "Does Patsers offer an intriguing insight into the Antwerp drug mafia? Sure. And a number of exciting moments will certainly stay with you afterwards. But that's all that can be said. A lot of effort and money has clearly been invested in action scenes, familiar faces and crazy graphics. But unfortunately the same cannot be said about the script and the acting. Where the first Patser film can still be seen as an interesting experiment, seven years later you would expect the directors to be able to create a stronger story now. Maybe try again in seven years?"
