= Geoffrey Enthoven =

Belgian film director, screenwriter and film editor

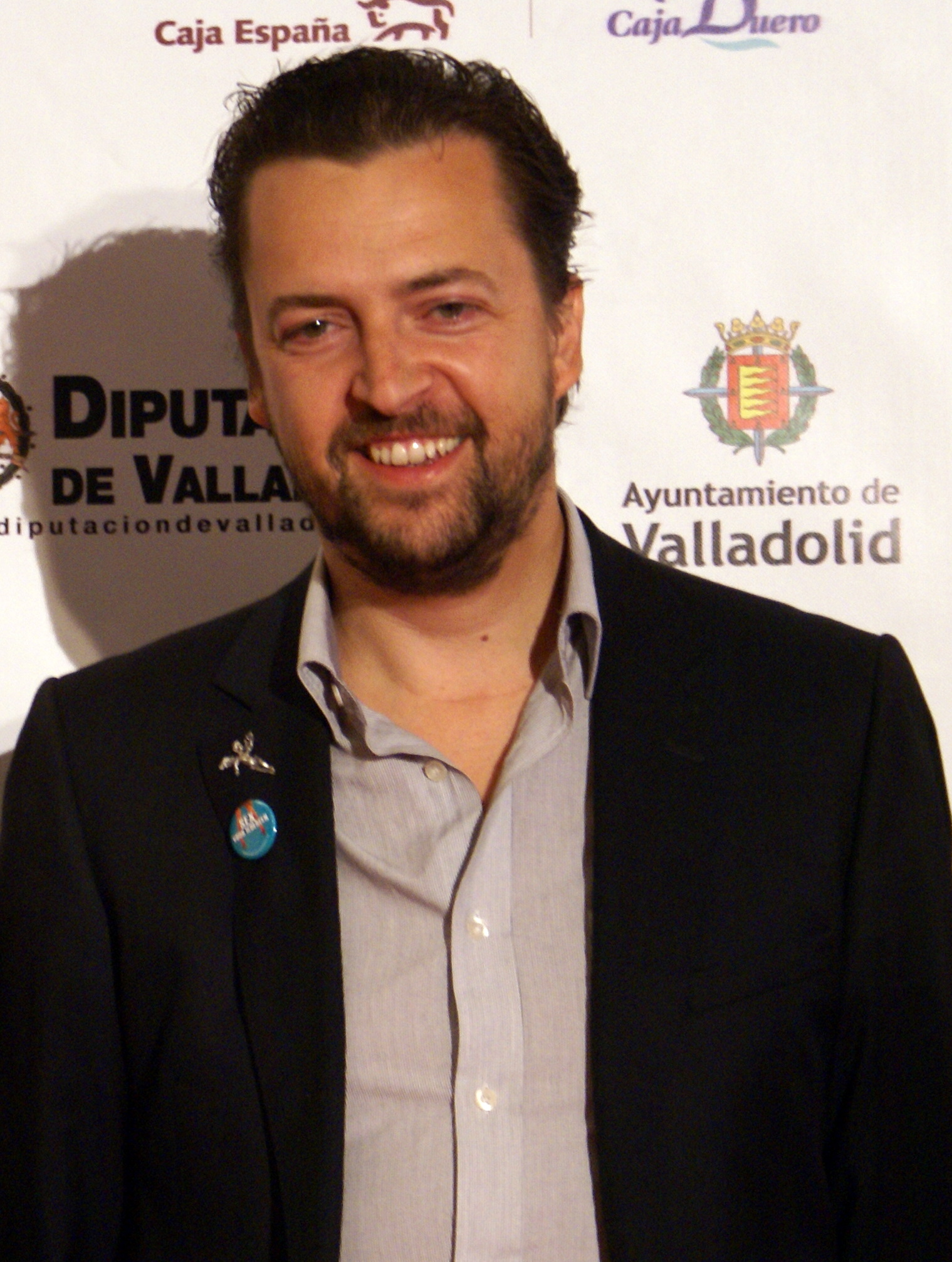
- Geoffrey Enthoven at the 56th Seminci
- Born: Geoffrey Enthoven; Wilrijk, Belgium
- Occupations: Director, screenwriter, editor, producer
- Years active: 1999–present

Geoffrey Enthoven is a Belgian film director, screenwriter, and film editor.

== Early life and education ==
Geoffrey Enthoven was born in Wilrijk, Belgium.

He graduated from the Royal Academy of Fine Arts in Ghent in 1999.

== Career ==
Enthoven's first feature film, Children of Love was greeted with enthusiasm and not only won the Audience Award at the Flanders International Film Festival Ghent but also received a Special Mention at the International Film Festival Mannheim-Heidelberg in Germany.

His second film, The Only One, was named best Belgian film of 2006 by the Belgian Film Critics Association, winning the André Cavens Award.

Enthoven directed the 2020 eight-part mystery drama television series created by his cousin Marie Enthoven, Invisible, released internationally as Unseen.

== Filmography ==
- Children of Love (Les enfants de l'amour) (2002)
- The Only One (Vidange perdue) (2006)
- Happy Together (2008)
- The Over the Hill Band (Meisjes) (2009)
- Come as You Are (Hasta la Vista!) (2011)
- Halfway (Halfweg) (2014)
- Unseen (Invisible) (2020 TV series)
