= Anna De Weert =

Belgian Luminist painter (1867–1950)

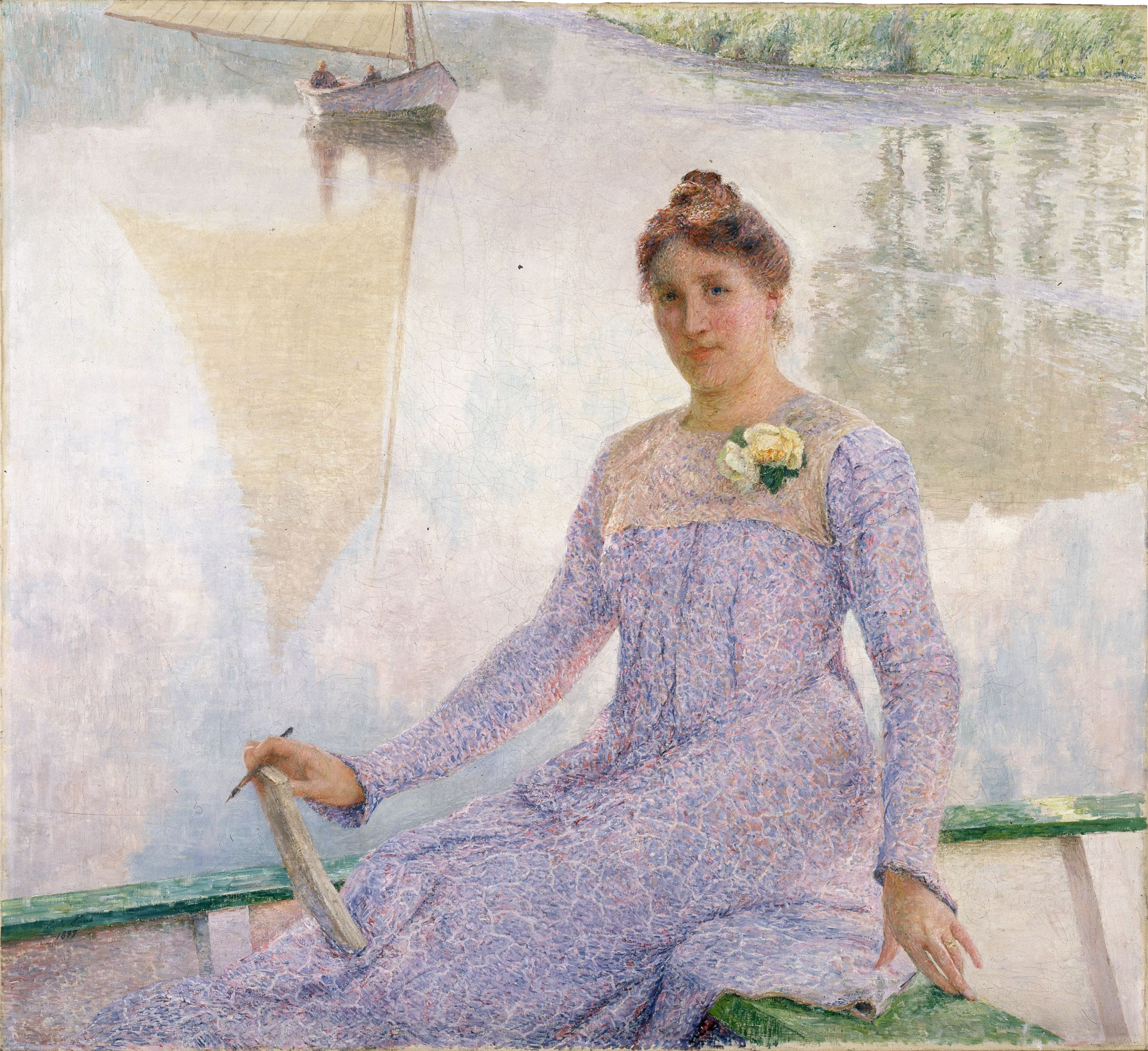
- Anna De Weert by Emile Claus, 1899
- Born: Anna Cogen; 27 May 1867; Ghent, Belgium
- Died: 12 May 1950 (aged 82); Ghent, Belgium
- Occupation: painter
- Known for: landscape painting
- Political party: Liberal
- Spouse: Maurice De Weert

Anna De Weert, née Cogen; Anna Virginie Caroline De Weert, also known as Anna De Weert-Cogen (27 May 1867, Ghent – 12 May 1950, Ghent) was a Belgian painter, prose writer and essayist. She is mainly known for landscapes painted in the Impressionist style referred to as Luminism which emphasizes light effects. She also made a number of designs for book illustrations. As a writer she wrote mainly essays and artist biographies in the French language.

== Life ==
De Weert was born in Ghent as Anna Virginie Caroline Cogen. Her father Eugène was a doctor. Her mother, Clara Ledeganck, was a Dutch-language writer of poems, sketches and stories. Her maternal grandfather was Karel Lodewijk Ledeganck, a law professor, politician and writer who supported the movement that fought the suppression of the Flemish language in Belgium.

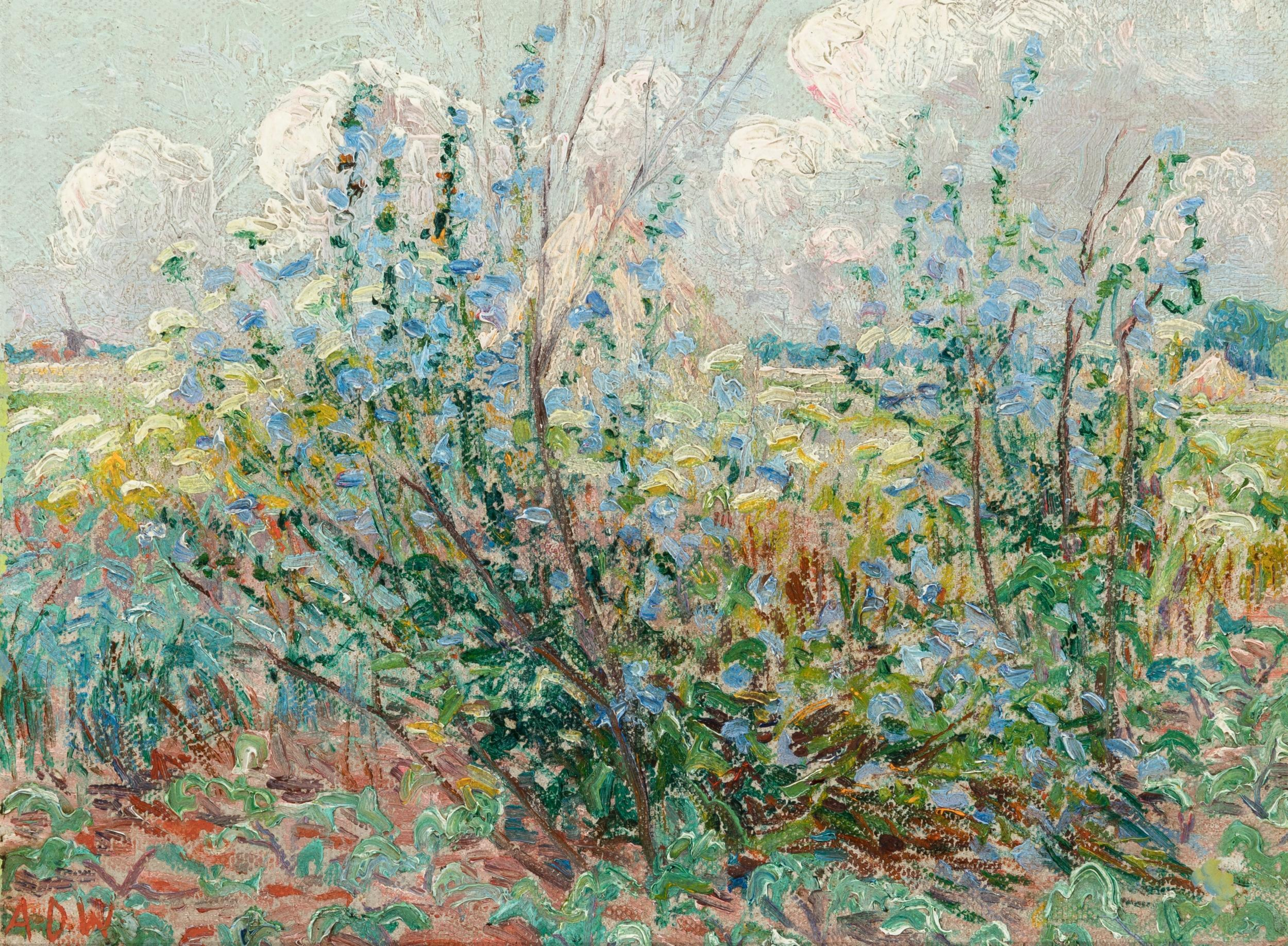
Flowers along the field

After her father died when she was two, she was raised by her extended family and in particular her mother and grandmother. She grew up in an intellectual and artistic environment. From an early age, she was interested in both drawing and literature. Her paternal uncles, Alphons and Felix Cogen, were successful painters. She attended the Institut de Kerchove and later studied at an industrial school for two years, as women were not yet admitted to the Ghent Academy at that time.

Her family was well-off and had a high regard for nature and art, in particular watercolour painting. Each summer she went with her family to their summer home in Menton in the South of France. Throughout her life she continued to spend her summers in the south of France. In 1891 she married Maurice De Weert, a lawyer, president of the bar, municipal councillor and alderman, journalist and essayist. In a letter to Virginie Loveling, she expressed her respect for her husband's writing talent.

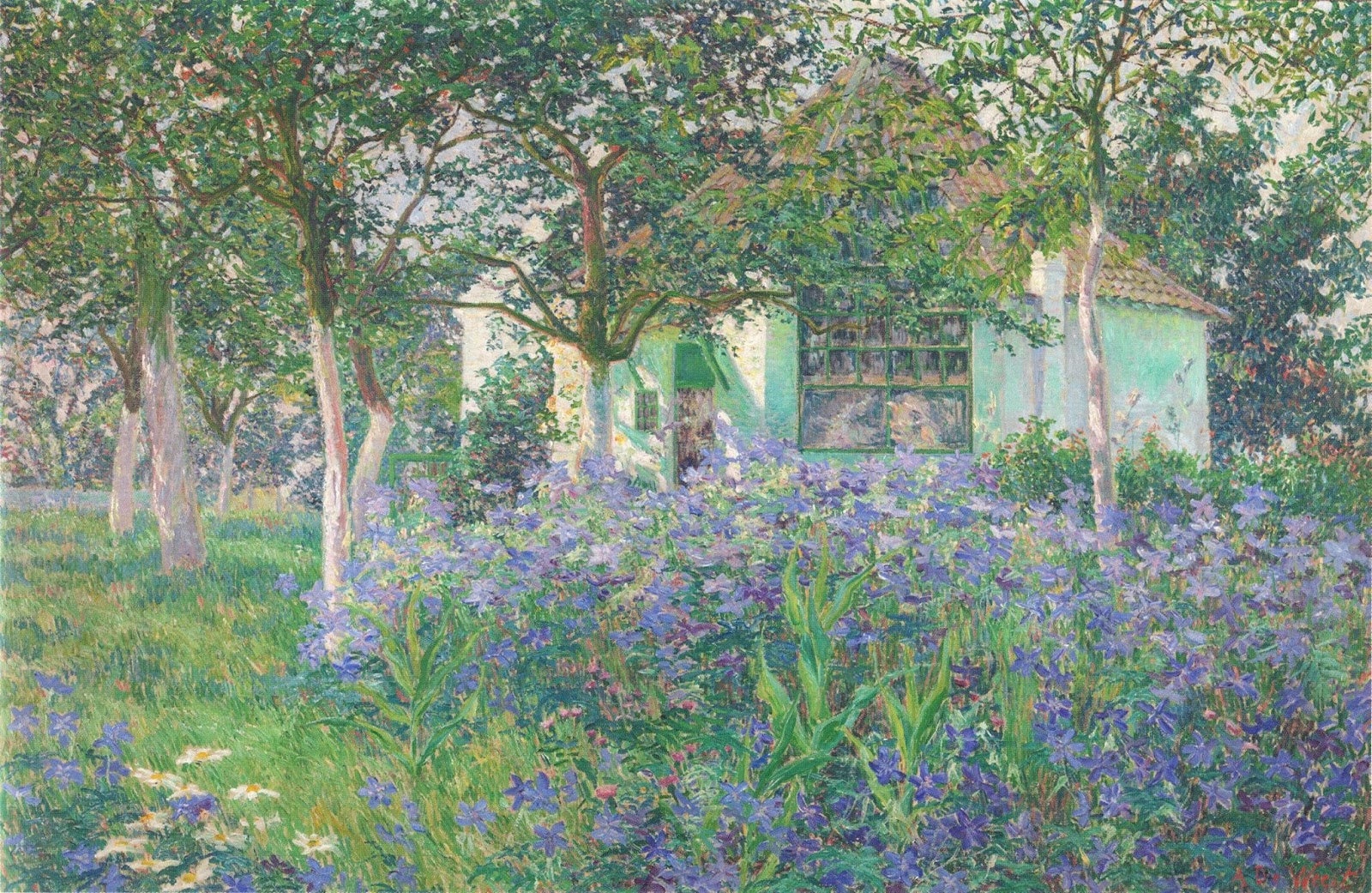
My Studio in June

In the 1890s, she was a private (pro bono) student of Emile Claus, a Belgian painter who under the influence of Claude Monet, had developed a style that has been characterized as luminism. She and her husband spent summers with him in the 1890s. In 1895, she moved into a new studio at a farm which she had bought in Afsnee near Ghent, beside the river Lys. The farm had previously belonged to a Dominican Monastery. She painted the farm in which he had her studio around 1909.

Emile Claus painted her portrait in a landscape in 1899.

== Work ==
Anna De Weert was a productive artist and had a long association with the Cercle Artistique et Littéraire in her home town after she first exhibited there in 1895. From 1895 to 1937, she continued to participate in Belgian and European salons. She was invited to the Salon d'Automne in Paris in 1907. Five of her works were sold in Zurich in 1908. By 1911, she had become one of the prominent artists from Belgium, representing at the International Exhibition of Women Artists in Turin. Her paintings primarily involved landscapes, interiors, and portraits. She was also part of the Vie et Lumière group; "Light, love, life" was the symbol of her life.

In addition to her artistic work, she gave art lectures and wrote many articles. As a writer, she was primarily an essayist and correspondent for the French language Ghent newspaper La Flandre libérale. In 1905, she published in Dutch the story Ridder Wenemaer. In 1927, she wrote an overview of Belgian and Flemish art from 1300 to 1900 for an exhibition in London that same year. She gave countless lectures throughout the country about her travels, about art and especially about Emile Claus. She further published books on her uncle Alphonse Cogen (1922) and Emile Claus (1926).

== Death and legacy ==
She died in Ghent in 1950. In her will she left her paintings together with a work by George Minne and two old masters to the Museum of Fine Arts in Ghent.

== Gallery ==
Selected works

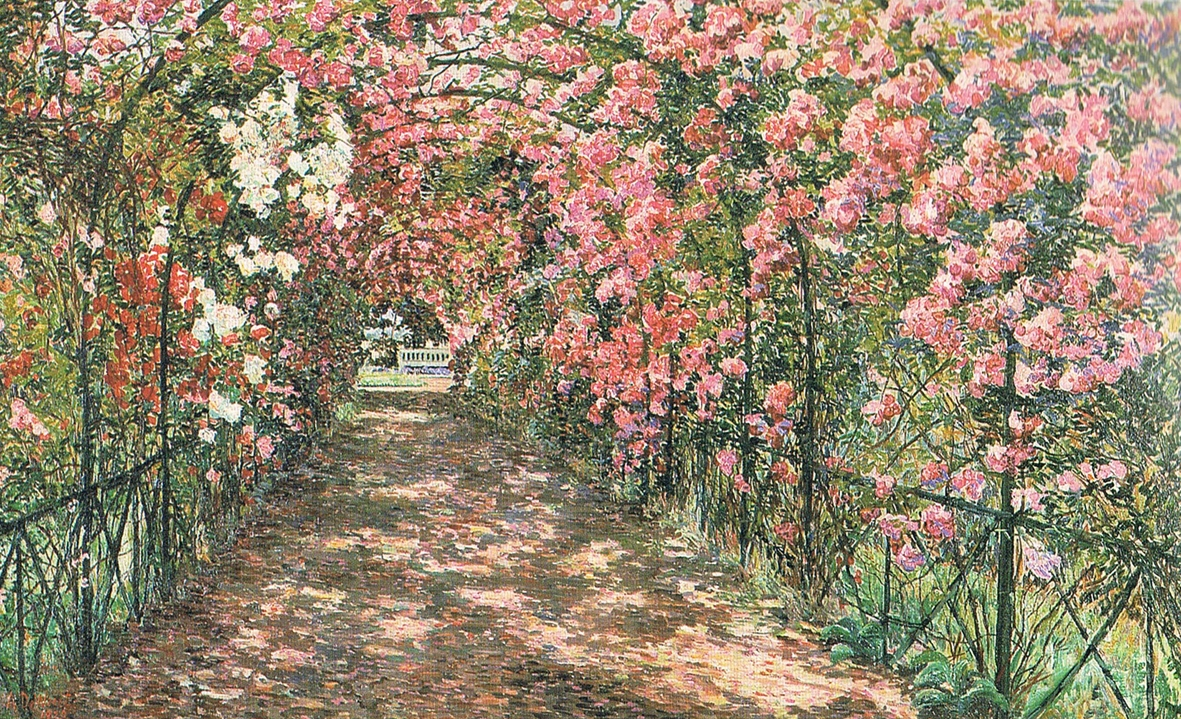
Rose arbour

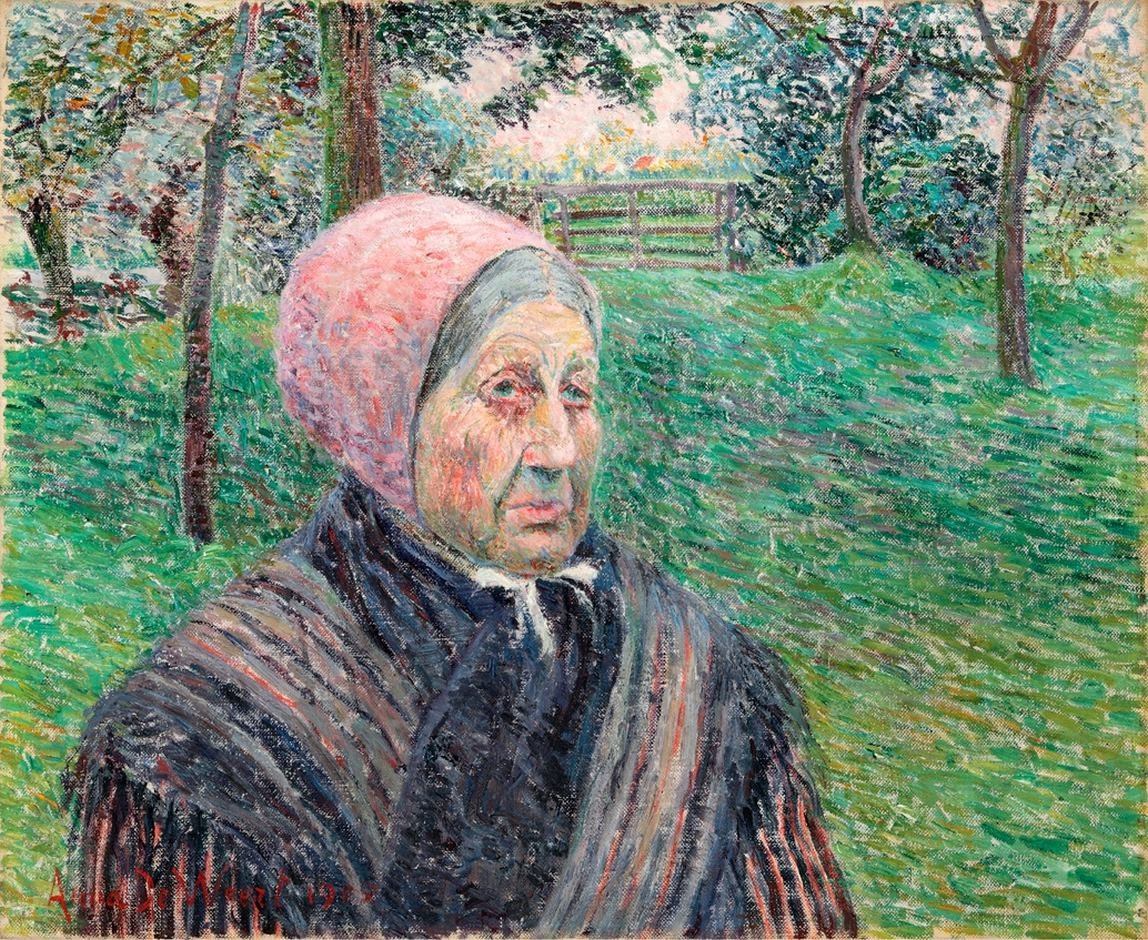
The Wife of the Gardner

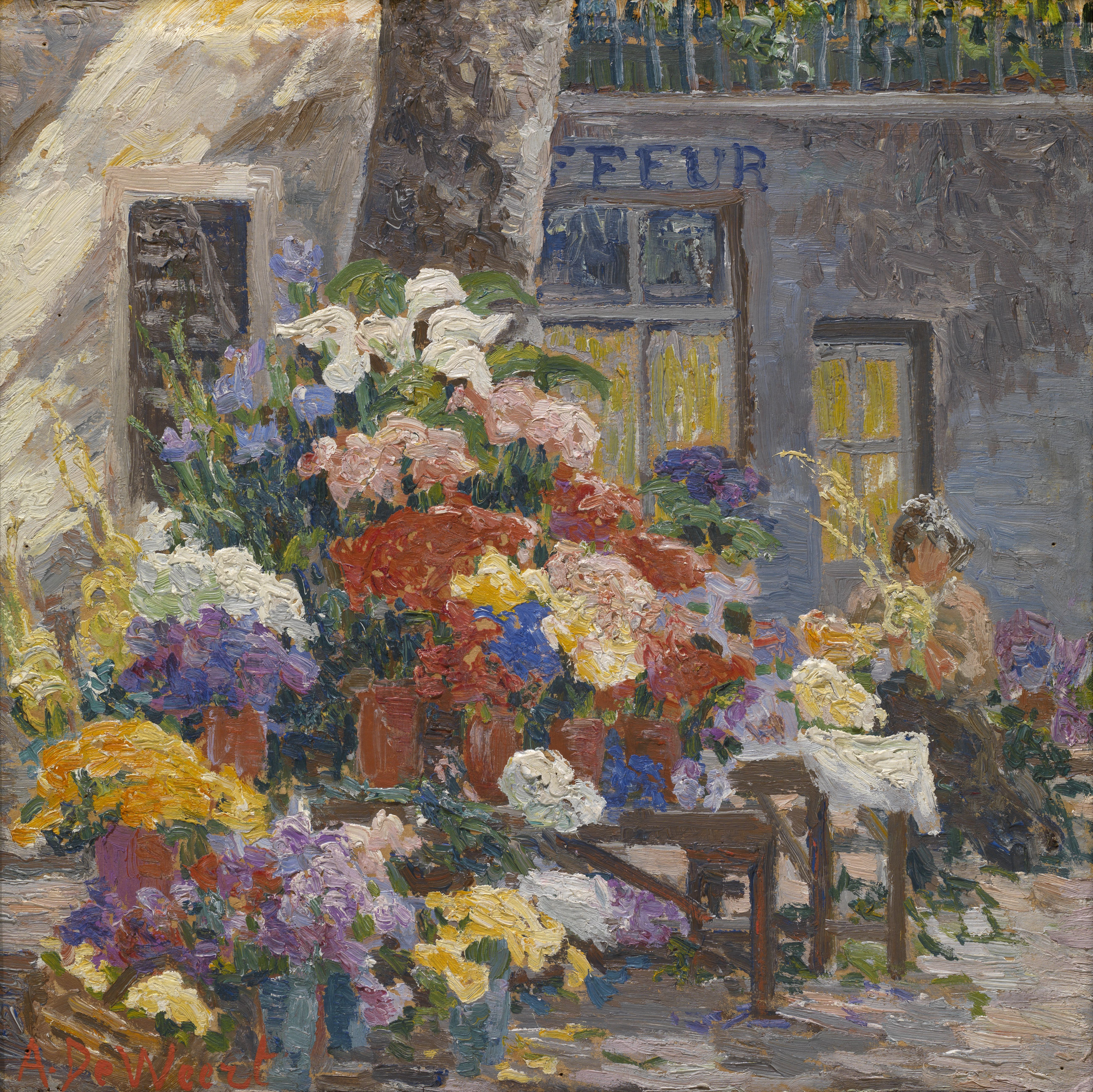
Flower Market at Menton

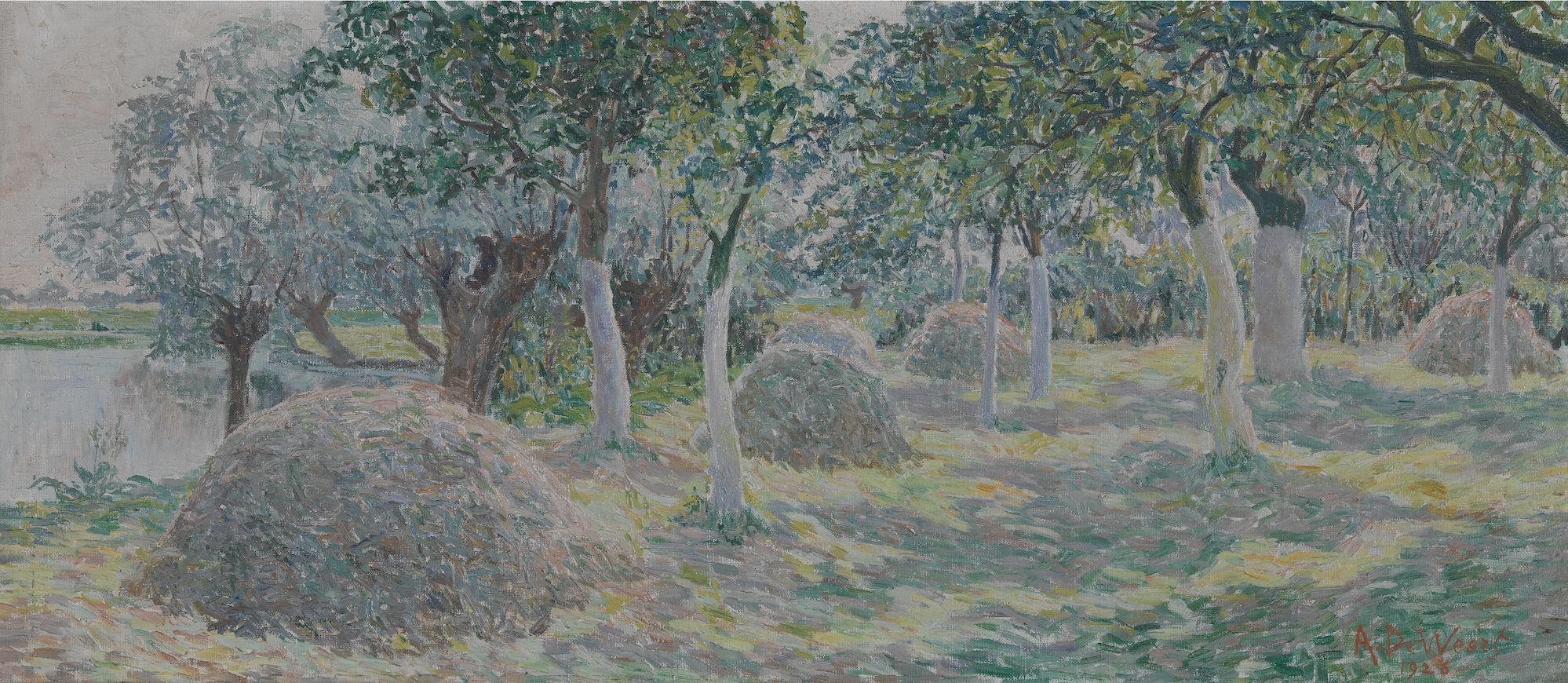
Orchard next to the studio

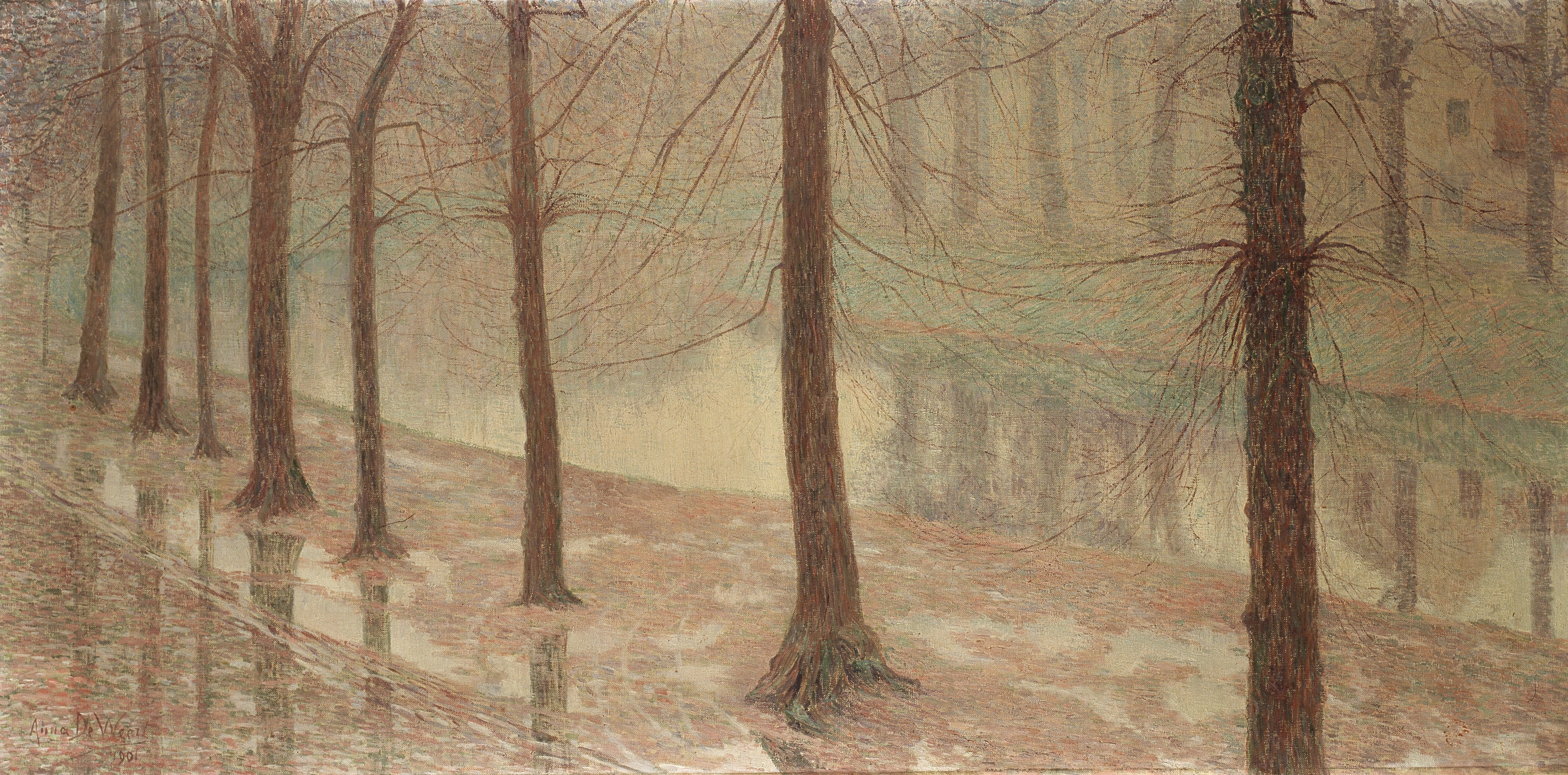
The Coupure in Ghent
