= Marijke Pinoy =

Belgian actress (born 1958)

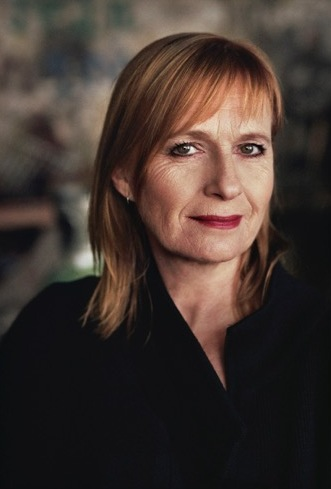
- Pinoy in 2016
- Born: August 19, 1958 (age 67); Menen, Belgium

Marijke Pinoy (Dutch pronunciation: [pi.nwa]; born 19 August 1958) is a Belgian actress.

== Biography ==
Marijke Pinoy was born in Menen on 19 August 1958. She has played several supporting characters in television series (such as Sedes & Belli) and short films. In 2007, she starred as the mother of the protagonist in the film Ben X. She founded the theater group Compagnie Cecilia. In 2006, she was the main guest for theater on Theater Aan Zee. In autumn 2008, she sat alongside biologist Dirk Draulans and styling specialist Tiany Kiriloff in the jury of the VTM program Moeders & dochters, which centered around the search for the best mother-daughter duo of Flanders.

She is the mother of actress Lotte Pinoy, among others.

For the federal elections of 2007, Marijke Pinoy stood on the 15th position on the East Flemish list of Green party Groen!. During the Flemish elections of 2009, Pinoy stood again for the Groen! list in East Flanders, and again for the 2010 federal elections. For the local elections of 2012 she ran as a candidate on the Groen! list in Evergem, but was not elected.

She was one of the dozens of artists who, on 7 September 2018, placed her signature under an open letter in The Guardian directed towards the organizers of the Eurovision Song Contest for setting the 2019 edition of the contest in Israel. The letter demanded that the European Broadcasting Union "cancel Israel's hosting of the contest altogether and move it to another country with a better human rights record."

In 2025, she won the Ultima for General Cultural Merit 2024.

== Theater ==
- NTGent - Frans Woyzeck (2011), as Margriet
- De Werf Brugge - Zwijg Kleine (1998), as Jacqueline

== Film and television ==
=== Television series ===
- Familie (1992) - guest role as Kristien, a friend of Monique
- Wittekerke (1993-1994) - Véronique Lemaître
- Windkracht 10 (1997) - guest role as mother of Katrien
- Recht op Recht (1999-2002) - guest role as the mother of Bjorn (1999), guest role as Natasja (2000), guest role as Gini Plaatsnijder (2001) and guest role as Ingrid De Potter (2002)
- W817 (2002) - guest role as Ms. Berckmans
- De Smaak van De Keyser (2008-2009) - Martine Reeckmans (old)
- LouisLouise (2009) - guest role as Mia Coucke
- Los zand (2009) - Mieke
- Witse (2006 en 2009) - guest role as Agnes Leemans and Milène De Smet
- Red Sonja (2012) - Viv
- Danni Lowinski (2012) - guest role as Erika
- Zone Stad (2013) - guest role as mother of Esther
- In Vlaamse velden (2013) - Suzanne Pelckmans
- The Team (2015) - Justine Verbeek
- Nonkels (2022) - guest role as Mammie Thérèse

=== Short films ===
- Beste papa (1991)
- Kurrel & Co (1999) - Thérèse
- Buiten adem! (1999)
- Love Machine (2003)
- Groenendael (2004) - Alies
- Aan zee (2004) - Mia
- Of cats & women (2007) - Ariël
- Onder Invloed (2013) - Ineke
- Hotel Mama (2017)
- Portrait of a disappearing woman (2023) - Sabine

=== Films ===
- Het gezin van Paemel (1986) - Romanie
- De zevende hemel (1993) - receptionist
- Man van staal (1999) - Victor's mother
- Buitenspel (2005) - Lies' mother
- Een ander zijn geluk (2005) - customer at the dry-cleaner's
- Vidange perdue (2006) - Sylvia
- Ben X (2007) - Ben's mother
- Small Gods (2007) - Mother
- Problemski Hotel (2015)
- Belgica (2016) - Diane
- Waarom Wettelen (2024) - Aunt Sherry
- Mother (2025) - Sister Katarina
