= Mother (2025 film) =

2025 film by Teona Strugar Mitevska

- Promotional poster
- Macedonian: Мајка
- Directed by: Teona Strugar Mitevska
- Written by: Goce Smilevski; Teona Strugar Mitevska; Elma Tataragić
- Based on: Teresa and I by Teona Strugar Mitevska
- Produced by: Labina Mitevska; Sebastien Delloye
- Starring: Noomi Rapace; Sylvia Hoeks; Nikola Ristanovski; Ekin Corapci; Marijke Pinoy; Labina Mitevska
- Cinematography: Virginie Saint-Martin
- Edited by: Per K. Kirkegaard
- Music by: Magali Gruselle; Flemming Nordkrog
- Production companies: Sisters and Brother Mitevski; Frau Film; Entre Chien et Loup; Film i Väst; Rainy Days Productions; SCCA/pro.ba; Raging Films
- Distributed by: Imagine Film (Belgium)
- Release dates: 27 August 2025 (Venice); 5 November 2025 (Belgium)
- Running time: 103 minutes
- Countries: North Macedonia; Belgium; Sweden; Denmark; Bosnia and Herzegovina; India
- Language: English

Mother (Macedonian: Мајка, romanized: Majka) is a 2025 drama film directed by Teona Strugar Mitevska, in her English-language feature debut, co-written by Mitevska, Goce Smilevski, and Elma Tataragić. It is based on Mitevska's four-part miniseries Teresa and I (2015). Starring Noomi Rapace, it follows the Macedonian-Albanian Catholic nun Mother Teresa establishment of the Missionaries of Charity in Kolkata, India.

The film had its world premiere in the Orizzonti section of the 82nd Venice International Film Festival on 27 August 2025.

== Premise ==
Mother is a fictional account that follows seven days in Mother Teresa's life when she decides to leave her convent in Kolkata, India, to establish her own religious order.

== Cast ==
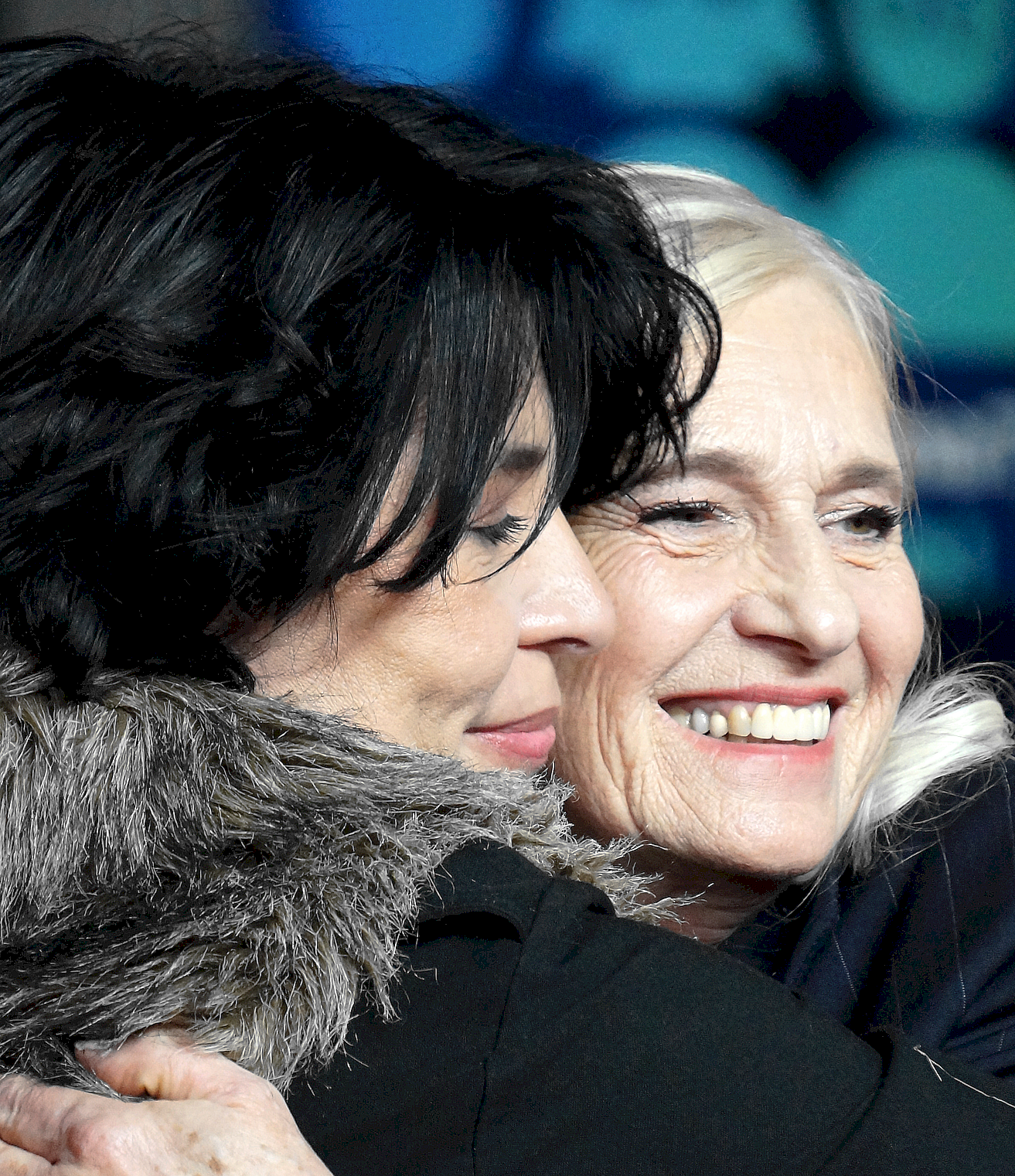
Teona Strugar Mitevska and Marijke Pinoy

- Noomi Rapace as Anjezë Bojaxhiu / Mother Teresa
- Sylvia Hoeks as Sister Agnieszka
- Nikola Ristanovski as Father Friedrich, Mother Teresa's confidant
- Ekin Corapci as Novice Agatha
- Marijke Pinoy as Sister Katarina
- Labina Mitevska as Sister Mercedes
- Akshay Kapoor as Doctor Kumar
- Adam-Anu Devarajan as Indian boy
- Diksha-Anu Devarajan as school girl

== Production ==
In February 2022, it was reported that Teona Strugar Mitevska would direct her seventh film, Mother about Mother Teresa. It marks her English-language feature directorial debut. The project was presented at the Berlinale Co-Production Market during the European Film Market in February 2022.

In May 2024, Noomi Rapace joined the cast as Mother Teresa. Rapace revealed that she was drawn to the film due to its offbeat portrayal of Mother Teresa. She further described it as "punk rock".

Principal photography took place in Brussels, Belgium and Kolkata, India and wrapped in November 2024.

== Release ==
Mother had its world premiere at the 82nd Venice International Film Festival at the Orizzonti section on 27 August 2025.

== Reception ==
=== Accolades ===
| Award | Date of ceremony | Category | Recipient(s) | Result | Ref. |
|---|---|---|---|---|---|
| Camerimage | November 22, 2025 | Golden Frog | Virginie Saint-Martin | Nominated | |
| Adriatic Film Awards | October 23–25, 2026 | Best Feature Film | Mother | Pending | |
| Adriatic Film Awards | October 23–25, 2026 | Best Lead Actress | Noomi Rapace | Pending | |
| Adriatic Film Awards | October 23–25, 2026 | Best Lead Actor | Nikola Ristanovski | Pending | |
| Adriatic Film Awards | October 23–25, 2026 | Best Director | Teona Strugar Mitevska | Pending | |
| Adriatic Film Awards | October 23–25, 2026 | Best Script | Goce Smilevski; Elma Tataragić; Teona Strugar Mitevska | Pending | |
