= Michael Pas =

Belgian actor (born 1966)

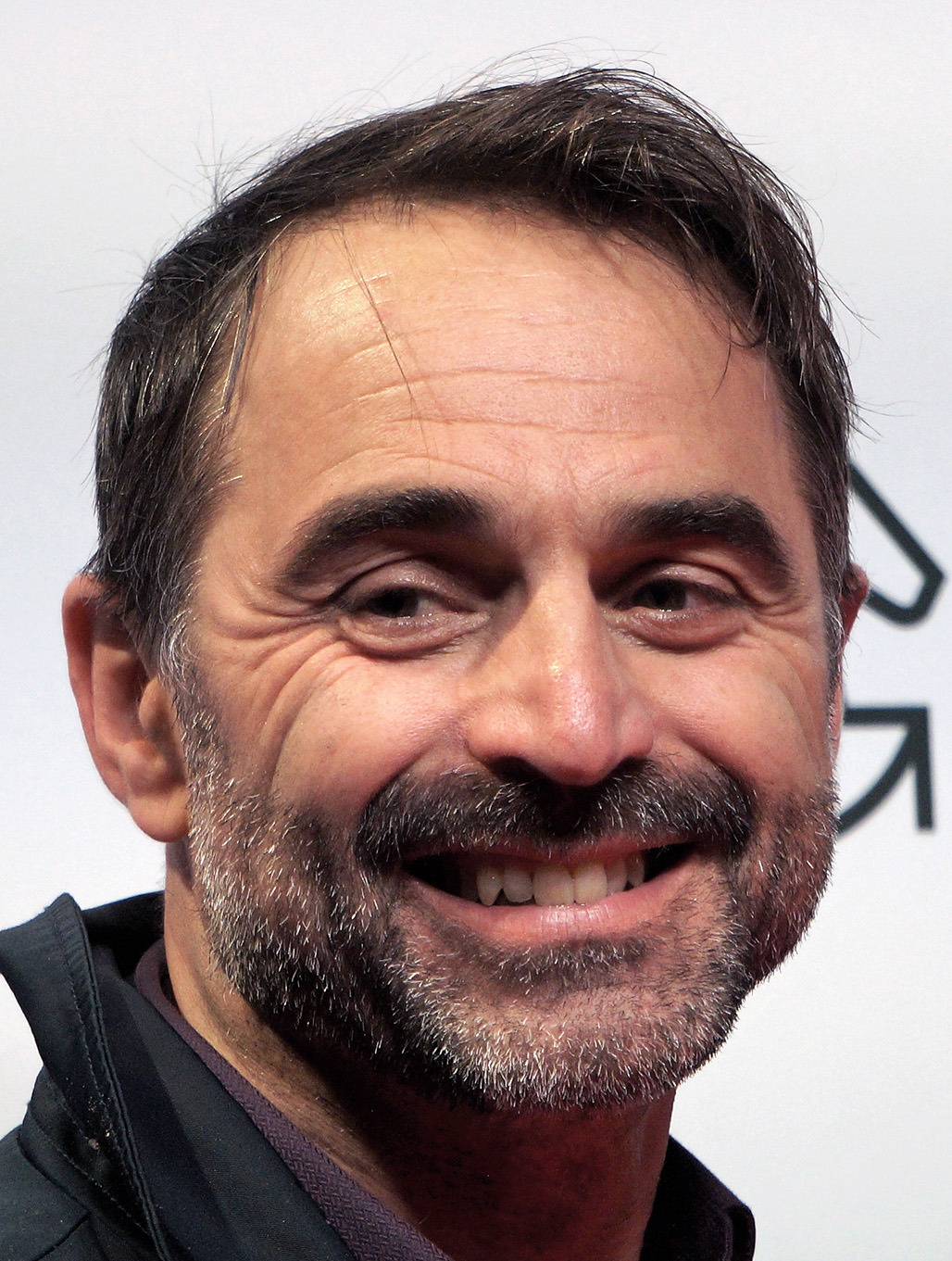
- Pas in 2019
- Born: 21 September 1966 (age 59)
- Occupation: Actor
- Years active: 1980–present

Michael Pas (born 21 September 1966) is a Belgian actor. He played detective Bob De Groof in the Belgian crime series Code 37.

== Selected filmography ==
- Eline Vere (1991)
- Toutes peines confondues (1992)
- Daens (1993)
- Anchoress (1993)
- Brylcream Boulevard (1995)
- Kulderzipken (1995)
- Het 14e kippetje (1998)
- The Wall (1998)
- Speer und Er (2005)
- Code 37 (2009)
- Nymphomaniac (2013)
