= Coppers (Belgian TV series) =

Belgian Dutch-language crime drama TV series

- Genre: Crime drama
- Created by: Toni Coppers
- Written by: Ed Vanderweyden
- Country of origin: Belgium
- Original language: Dutch
- No. of series: 1
- No. of episodes: 13

Production
- Producers: Jeroen Dumoulein; Maarten Moerkerke
- Running time: 50 minutes

Original release
- Network: VTM
- Release: January 4, 2016 – 2016

Coppers, named both for police officers as well as the creator's surname, and also known as Rough Justice in English-speaking countries, is a Belgian television crime drama. In both the U.S., and the UK, the series is shown on Walter Presents.

== Cast ==
=== Main ===
- Hilde De Baerdemaeker – Commissaris Liese Meerhout
- Luk Wyns – Hoofdinspecteur Michel Masson
- Lotte Pinoy – Hoofdinspecteur Sofie Jacobs
- Bert Verbeke – Inspecteur Laurent Vandenbergh

=== Recurring ===
- Joris Hessels – Wetsdokter Fabian Steppe
- Arnold Willems – Paul Meerhout
- Rudy Morren – Hoofdcommissaris Frank Torfs
- Abigail Abraham – Baïna Mpenzi
- Christiaens Annick – Carine D'Hooren
- Robbie Cleiren – Freddy Steveniers
- Mathias Sercu – Pierre Bouwens
- Sura Dohnke – Sura Droste
- Gert Winckelmans – Benoit Nollet
