= Fight Girl =

2018 Dutch film directed by Johan Timmers

- Theatrical release poster
- Directed by: Johan Timmers
- Written by: Barbara Jurgens
- Starring: Aiko Beemsterboer
- Release dates: 30 September 2018 (Netherlands FF); 10 October 2018 (Netherlands)
- Running time: 84 minutes
- Countries: Netherlands; Bosnia and Herzegovina
- Language: Dutch

Fight Girl (Dutch: Vechtmeisje) is a 2018 Dutch-Bosnian action drama film directed by Johan Timmers and written by Barbara Jurgens. In July 2019, it was shortlisted as one of the nine films in contention to be the Dutch entry for the Academy Award for Best International Feature Film at the 92nd Academy Awards, but it was not selected.

== Cast ==
- Aiko Beemsterboer as Bo
- Hilde De Baerdemaeker as Esther
- Imanuelle Grives as Cecilia
