= Gangsta (film) =

2018 film by Adil El Arbi and Bilall Fallah

- Film poster
- Dutch: Patser
- Directed by: Adil El Arbi; Bilall Fallah
- Written by: Nabil Ben Yadir; Adil El Arbi; Bilall Fallah; Bram Renders; Kobe Van Steenberghe; Hendrik Verthé
- Produced by: Kobe Van Steenberghe; Hendrik Verthré
- Starring: Matteo Simoni; Nora Gharib; Saïd Boumazoughe; Gene Bervoets; Axel Daeseleire
- Cinematography: Robrecht Heyvaert
- Edited by: Adil El Arbi; Bilall Fallah; Thijs Van Nuffel; Kobe Van Steenberghe
- Music by: Hannes De Maeyer
- Production companies: A Team Productions; Column Film
- Distributed by: Kinepolis Film Distribution; Dutch FilmWorks
- Release date: January 24, 2018 (Belgium)
- Running time: 125 minutes
- Country: Belgium
- Languages: Dutch; Arabic

Gangsta (Dutch: Patser) is a 2018 Belgian crime film co-edited, co-written and directed by Adil El Arbi and Bilall Fallah. Main roles are played by Matteo Simoni, Nora Gharib, Saïd Boumazoughe, Gene Bervoets and Axel Daeseleire.

== Synopsis ==
Adamo is a young man living in Antwerp. His roots are Moroccan-Italian. He and his friends deal soft drugs. Their cover is the pizzeria of their uncle Farid. They then plan to concentrate on selling hard drugs. They agree with drug lord Orlando Marie to pick up a shipment of cocaine smuggled via the port of Antwerp. When they are almost caught by two policemen, they are forced to dump the cocaine in the river Scheldt.

Adamo retrieves part of the cocaine and starts selling it. The two policemen also find part of the drugs and set up a drugs swindle. Orlando starts a manhunt to retrieve his money.

== Cast ==
- Matteo Simoni as Adamo
- Nora Gharib as Badia
- Saïd Boumazoughe as Volt
- Pommelien Thijs as Femke
- Junes Lazaar as Junes
- Nabil Mallat as Yasser
- Paloma Aguilera Valdebenito as El Toro
- Gene Bervoets as investigative judge
- Axel Daeseleire as Stijn
- Jeroen Perceval as Geert
- Stefan Perceval as Rudy
- Vic De Wachter as chief officer
- Ali B as Hassan Kamikaze
- Werner Kolf as Orlando Marie
- Noureddine Farihi as uncle Farid
- François Beukelaers as priest
- Eric Corton as Mathijs Steensma
- Aza Declercq as Maria
- Hef Frans as Hef
- Bond Mgebrishvili as Bodyguard Orlando Marie
- Ludwig Hendrickx as Bodyguard Orlando Marie
- Hans Royaards as Politician
- Dimitri Vegas & Like Mike

== Sequel ==
The film was followed by the 2025 sequel Gangstas.
