= Naturalism (literature) =

Literary movement

Naturalism is a literary movement beginning in the late nineteenth century, similar to literary realism in its rejection of Romanticism , but distinct in its embrace of determinism, detachment, scientific objectivism, and social commentary. Literary naturalism emphasizes observation and the scientific method in the fictional portrayal of reality. Naturalism includes detachment, in which the narrator maintains an impersonal tone and disinterested point of view; determinism, which is defined as the opposite of free will, in which a character's fate has been decided, even predetermined, by impersonal forces of nature beyond human control; and a sense that the universe itself is indifferent to human life. The novel would be an experiment where the author could discover and analyze the forces, or scientific laws, that influenced behavior, and these included emotion, heredity, and environment. The movement largely traces to the theories of French author Émile Zola.

== Background ==
Literary Naturalism traces back most directly to Émile Zola's "The Experimental Novel" (1880), which details Zola's concept of a naturalistic novel, which traces philosophically to Auguste Comte's positivism, but also to physiologist Claude Bernard and historian Hippolyte Taine. Comte had proposed a scientific method that "went beyond empiricism, beyond the passive and detached observation of phenomena". The application of this method "called for a scientist to conduct controlled experiments that would either prove or disprove hypotheses regarding those phenomena". Zola took this scientific method and argued that naturalism in literature should be like controlled experiments in which the characters function as the phenomena.

Naturalism began as a branch of literary realism, and realism had favored fact, logic, and impersonality over the imaginative, symbolic, and supernatural. Frank Norris, an American journalist and novelist, whose work was predominantly in the naturalist genre, "placed realism, romanticism, and naturalism in a dialectic, in which realism and romanticism were opposing forces", and naturalism was a mixture of the two. Norris's idea of naturalism differs from Zola's in that "it does not mention materialistic determinism or any other philosophic idea".

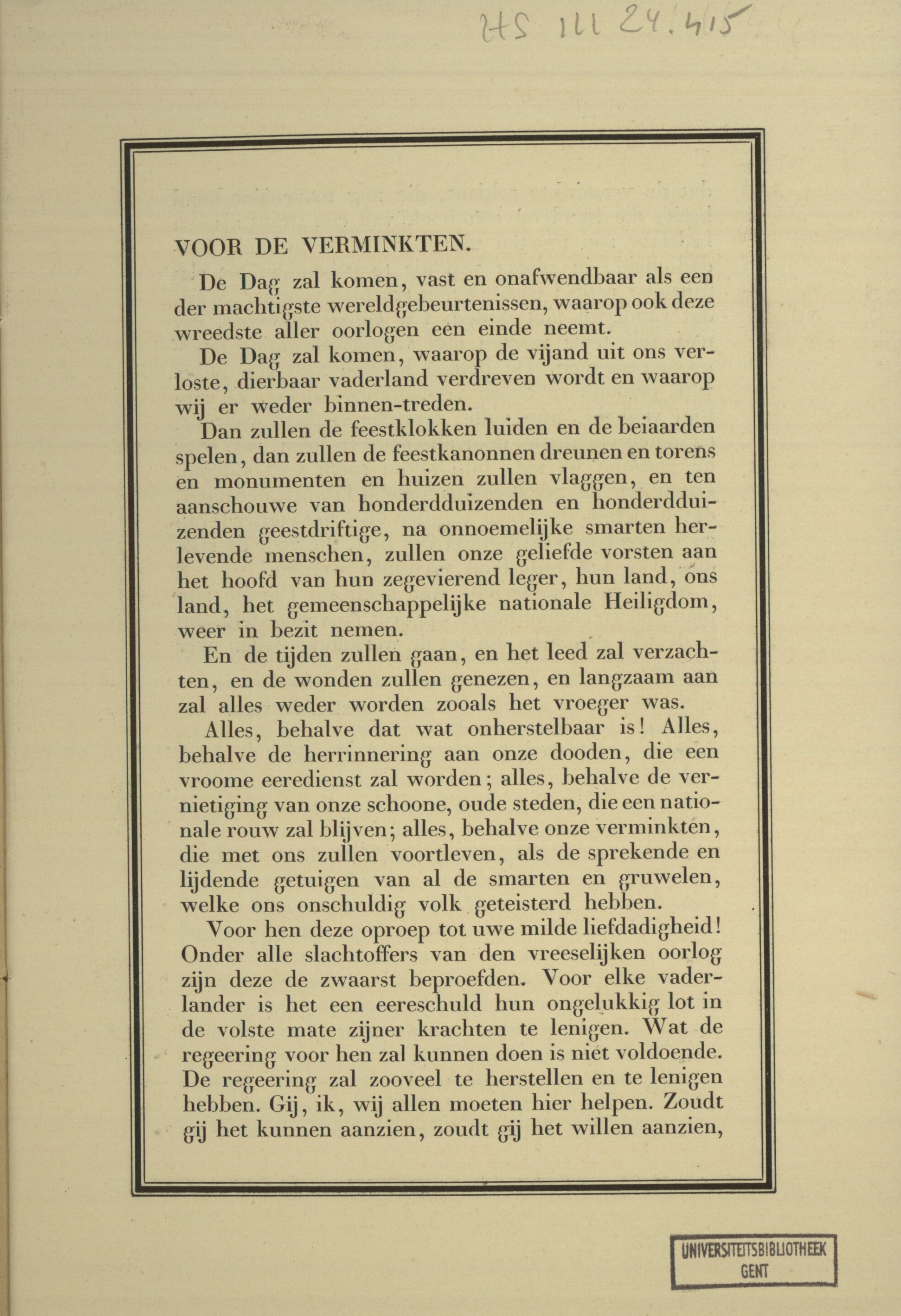
Excerpt from the naturalistic book "Le sou du mutilé". Written by Cyriel Buysse in the beginning of the 20th century.

Apart from Zola and Norris, there are various literary critics who have their own separate views on the matter. As said by Paul Civello, these critics can be grouped into four broad, and often overlapping, groups: early theorists, history-of-idea critics, European influence critics, and recent theorists. The early theorists saw naturalism thematically and in terms of literary technique. The history-of-idea critics understood it as an expression of the central ideas to an era. The European influence critics viewed it in much the same way as Zola. For example, according to theorist Kornelije Kvas, naturalism presents "forms of human experience not spoken of before – the physiological aspect of human behavior, sexuality, poverty – as literary topics worthy of being dealt with." Recent theorists have either re-conceptualized naturalism as a narrative form, or denied its existence entirely.

Some say that naturalism is dead, or that it "may have never lived at all: even in the works of Émile Zola", its founder. "In 1900 an obituary entitled "The Passing of Naturalism" in The Outlook officially declared the literary movement deceased", and that Zola's attempt to create a scientific literature was a failure. This certainly was not the first time Zola's novel had been criticized however. After his novel Thérèse Raquin (1867) had been sharply criticized for both contents and language, in a foreword for its second edition (1868), in a mixture of pride and defiance, he wrote: "Le groupe d'écrivains naturalistes auquel j'ai l'honneur d'appartenir a assez de courage et d'activité pour produire des oeuvres fortes, portant en elles leur défense", which translates as: "The group of naturalist writers I have the honor to belong to have enough courage and activity to produce strong works, carrying within them their defense."

Naturalism was very popular in its time and was known in different literary traditions in Western Europe. In the Netherlands, there was Cooplandt, Couperus, Frederik van Eeden and Marcellus Emants. In Denmark, Jens Peter Jacobsen. In Germany, the most important naturalistic writers were Gerhart Hauptmann, Arno Holz and Johannes Schlaf. In Belgium, the most important writers were Cyriel Buysse and Stijn Streuvels. In Spain, the most remarkable figure was Emilia Pardo Bazán; In Brazil, the main writer of the genre was Aluísio de Azevedo.

== American Naturalism ==
Naturalism in American literature traces to Frank Norris, whose theories were markedly different from Zola's, particularly to the status of naturalism within the loci of realism and Romanticism; Norris thought of naturalism as being Romantic, and thought Zola as being "a realist of realists". To Link, while American naturalism had trends, its definition had no unified critical consensus. Link's examples include Stephen Crane, Jack London, Theodore Dreiser, and Frank Norris, with William Dean Howells and Henry James being clear markers on the other side of the naturalist/realist divide.

The center of Crane's naturalism is recognized as "The Open Boat," which portrayed a naturalistic view of man with his depiction of a group of survivors adrift in a boat. The humans with their creation confronted the sea and the world of nature. In the experiences of these men, Crane articulated the illusion of gods and the realization of the universe's indifference.

William Faulkner's "A Rose for Emily," a story about a woman who killed her lover, is considered an example of a narrative within the naturalism category. This story, which also used Gothic elements, presented a tale that highlighted the extraordinary and excessive features in human nature and the social environment that influences them. The protagonist, Miss Emily, was forced to lead an isolated life, and that – combined with her mental illness – made insanity her inevitable fate. The environment in the forms of a class structure based on slavery and social change, together with heredity, represented the forces beyond her control.

== See also ==
- Naturalism (philosophy)
- Naturalism (theatre)
- Sociological naturalism
- Naturalism in 19th-century French literature
- Realism (arts)
- Realism (literature)
- Verismo (literature)
