= Code 37 =

Belgian Dutch-language crime drama TV series

- Also known as: Code 37: Sex Crimes
- Genre: Crime drama
- Starring: Veerle Baetens, Clara Cleymans, Michael Pas
- Country of origin: Belgium
- Original language: Dutch
- No. of series: 3
- No. of episodes: 39

Production
- Running time: 45 minutes

Original release
- Network: VTM
- Release: 31 August 2009 – 22 November 2012

Code 37, also known as Code 37: Sex Crimes in English-speaking countries, is a Belgian television crime-drama. In both the U.S. and the UK, the series is shown on Walter Presents.

== Content ==
The series focuses on a police unit, in particular its chief investigator Hannah Maes, specializing in sexual offenses such as rape, incest, pornography, abuse, pedophilia, exhibitionism, harassment and discrimination. There is also an ongoing sub-plot focusing on a home invasion that happened to Maes and her parents eight years earlier.

== Cast ==
- Veerle Baetens as Hannah Maes
- Michael Pas as Bob De Groof
- Marc Lauwrys as Charles Ruiters
- Gilles De Schryver as Kevin Desmet
- Geert Van Rampelberg as Koen Verberk
- Carry Goossens as Robert Maes
- Ben Segers as Mark Vermaelen
- Mieke De Groote as Greet Adriaans
- Herman Gilis as Erwin Struelens
- Clara Cleymans as Vicky Renders
