= Afsnee =

Sub-municipality of the city of Ghent, Belgium

- Sub-municipality of Ghent
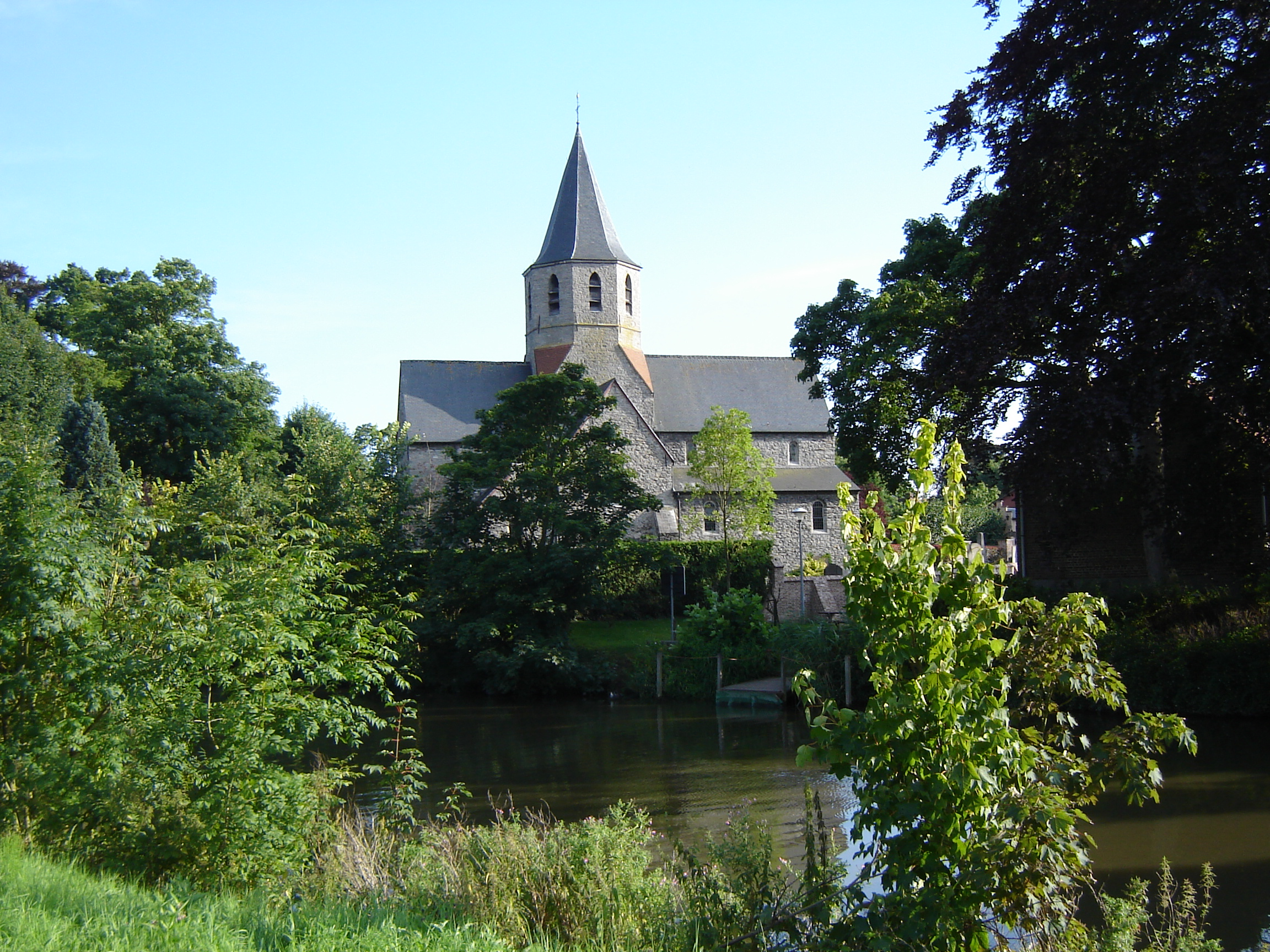
- View on the John the Baptish Church
- Interactive map of Afsnee
- Location within Belgium Location within East Flanders
- Coordinates: 51°1′51″N 3°40′6″E
- Country: Belgium
- Community: Flemish Community
- Region: Flemish Region
- Province: East Flanders
- Arrondissement: Ghent
- Municipality: Ghent

Area
  - Total: 3.95 km^{2} (1.53 sq mi)

Population (2020-01-01)
  - Total: 798
  - Density: 202/km^{2} (523/sq mi)
- Postal codes: 9051, 9031
- Area codes: 09

Afsnee (Dutch pronunciation: [ˈɑfsneː]) is a sub-municipality of the city of Ghent located in the province of East Flanders, Flemish Region, Belgium. It was a separate municipality until 1977. On 1 January 1977, it was merged into Ghent.

It is situated at the banks of the river Lys.

Maurice and Anna De Weert bought a farm at Afsnee in 1895 beside the Lys which had belonged to a Dominican Monastery. Anna would paint there.
