= Paul Cammermans =

Belgian film director and actor (1921–1999)

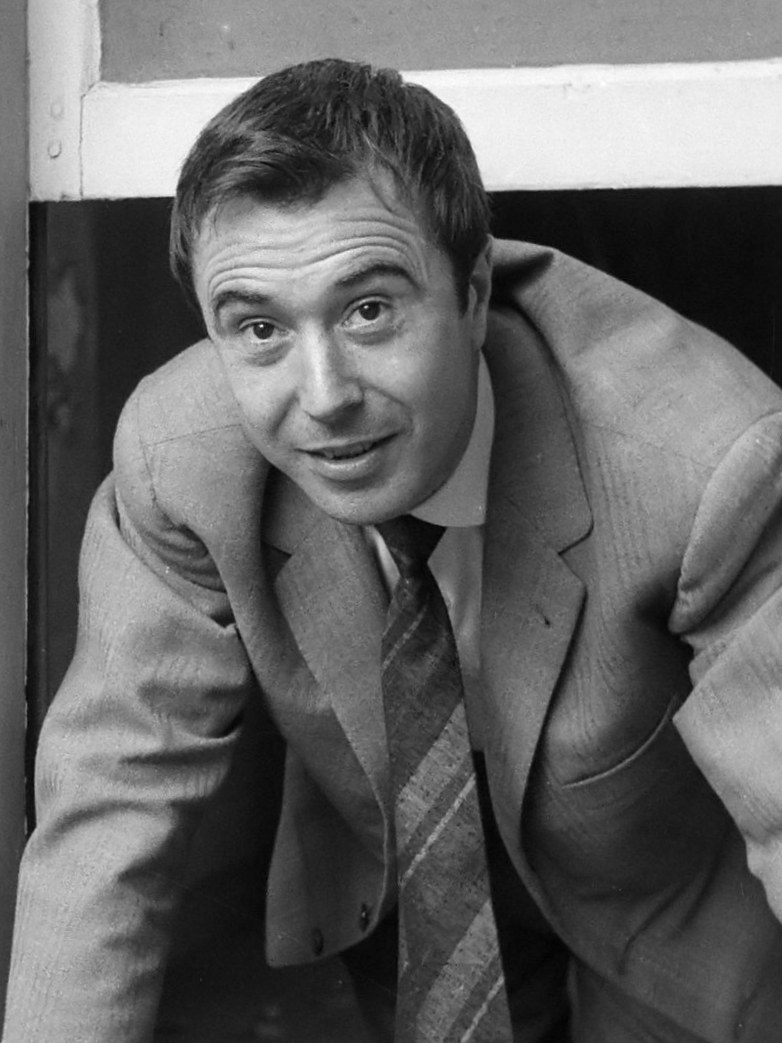
- Paul Cammermans (1961)
- Born: 10 July 1921; Berlare, Flanders, Belgium
- Died: 22 January 1999 (aged 77); Zemst, Flanders, Belgium
- Occupations: Film director, actor
- Years active: 1955-1994

Paul Cammermans (10 July 1921 – 22 January 1999) was a Belgian film director and actor. His 1986 film The van Paemel Family won the Cavens Prize for best Belgian film of the year and was entered into the 15th Moscow International Film Festival. The film adapts a play, in a staging of which Cammermans had had a role.

Cammermans is "better known as an actor in the films of Edith Kiel and Jef Bruyninckx" and made his directorial debut with Spuit Elf (Needle Eleven) in 1954.

== Selected filmography ==
=== As director ===
- Spuit Elf (also screenwriter and actor) (1954)
- Dirk van Haveskerke (1978)
- The van Paemel Family (1986)
