= Hilde De Baerdemaeker =

Flemish actress (born 1978)

Hilde de Baerdemaeker
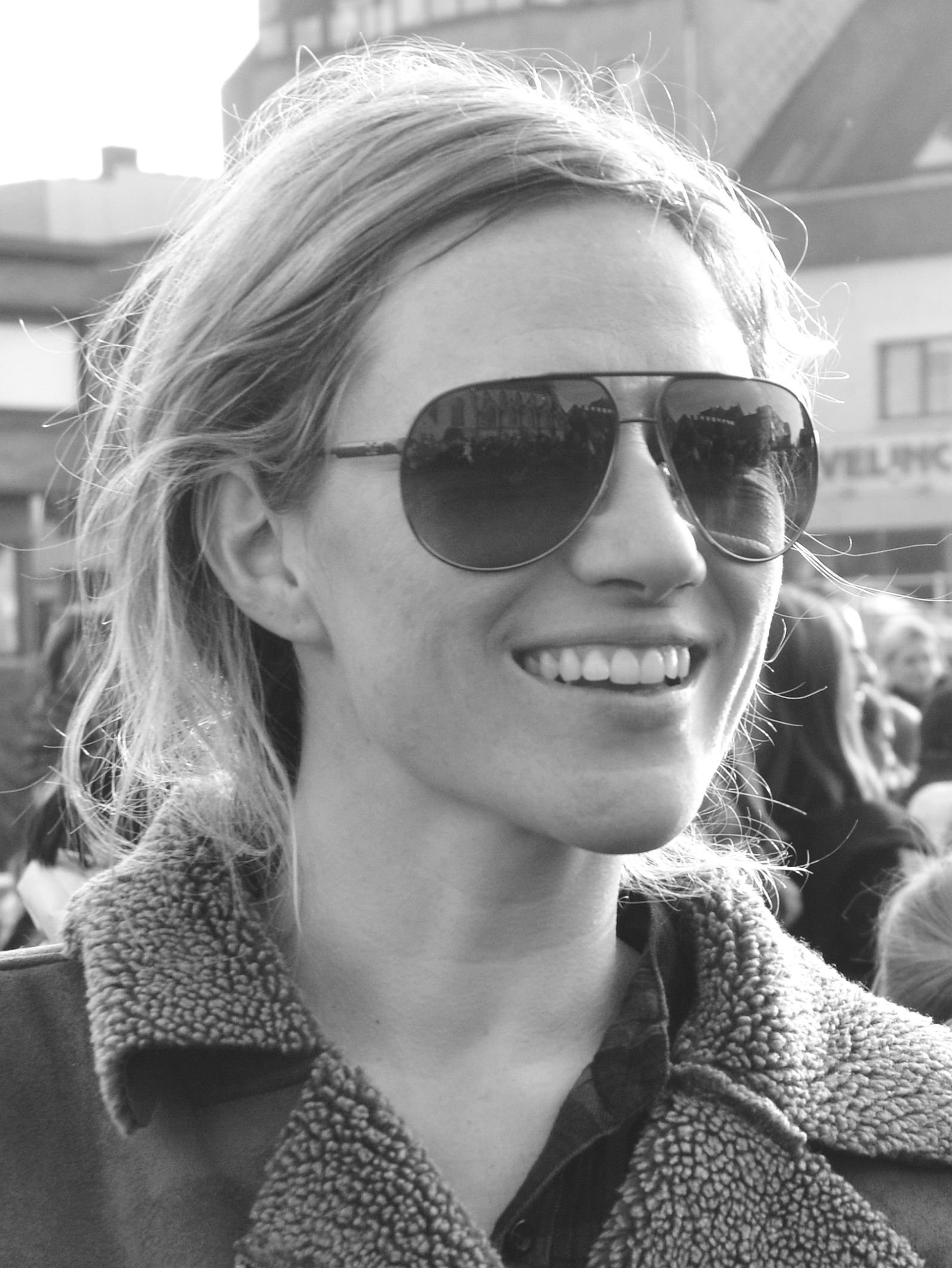
- Hilde de Baerdemaeker in 2011
- Born: 8 May 1978 (age 48); Deinze, East Flanders, Belgium
- Occupation: Actress
- Years active: 2001–present

Hilde de Baerdemaeker (born 8 May 1978) is a Flemish actress. She is best known for her roles as Louise in Louislouise, and as Linda De Leenheer in De Zaak Alzheimer (in English: The Memory of a Killer or The Alzheimer Case), Team Spirit, and Halleluja. She reprised her role as Linda de Leenheer in Dossier K.

== Filmography ==
- Alias 2002 – Eva
- Team Spirit II 2003 – Katia
- Fear Factor 2003 Herself
- De zaak Alzheimer 2005 – Linda de Leenheer
- Oekanda 2005 "Nicole"
- Focus 2005–2006 Presentation
- Webcameraden 2005–2006 Maxxime
- Witte Raven 2006 Herself
- Wittekerke 2007–2008 – Kathleen
- Halleluja 2008 – Amanda
- Louislouise 2008–2009 Louise De Roover
- Dossier K 2009 – Linda de Leenheer
- Coppers 2016 – Liese Meerhout
- Zone Stad – Gabrielle (one episode)
- Sketch up (Various Characters)
- Bouwmeester presentatrice
- Wit Down Under presentation
- Fight Girl

== Theatre ==
- Froe Froe (Orfee)
- Fun (regie M. De Wilde)
- Othello (regie A.Pringels)
- Don Quichot (regie H. De Weerdt)
- De tramlijn die Verlangen heet (regie P. Bangels)
- Bloedbruiloft (regie P. Bangels)
- RapBattle (regie T. Hermsen)
- Wieskiewijven (regie Jan Steen)
- Aiao (regie F. Van der Aa)
- Mirandolina (regie: K. Smets)
- De Celliste, K. Smets (regie: K.Smets)
- Het huis van Bernarda Alba, G. Lorca (regie: K.Smets)
- Koning Van Katoren (regie F. Taveirne)
- Ratten en Rakkers (regie F. Bakeland)
- All Aboard (regie D. Coussement)
- Hallo Mister Fiever (regie E. Goossens)
- Nimh (regie E. Goossens)
- De Wiz (regie J. Lammertijn)
- Naar (regie J. Lammertijn)
- Annie (regie F. Bakeland)
- Erik (regie K. De Schepper)
