= Ianka Fleerackers =

Belgian actress and television presenter

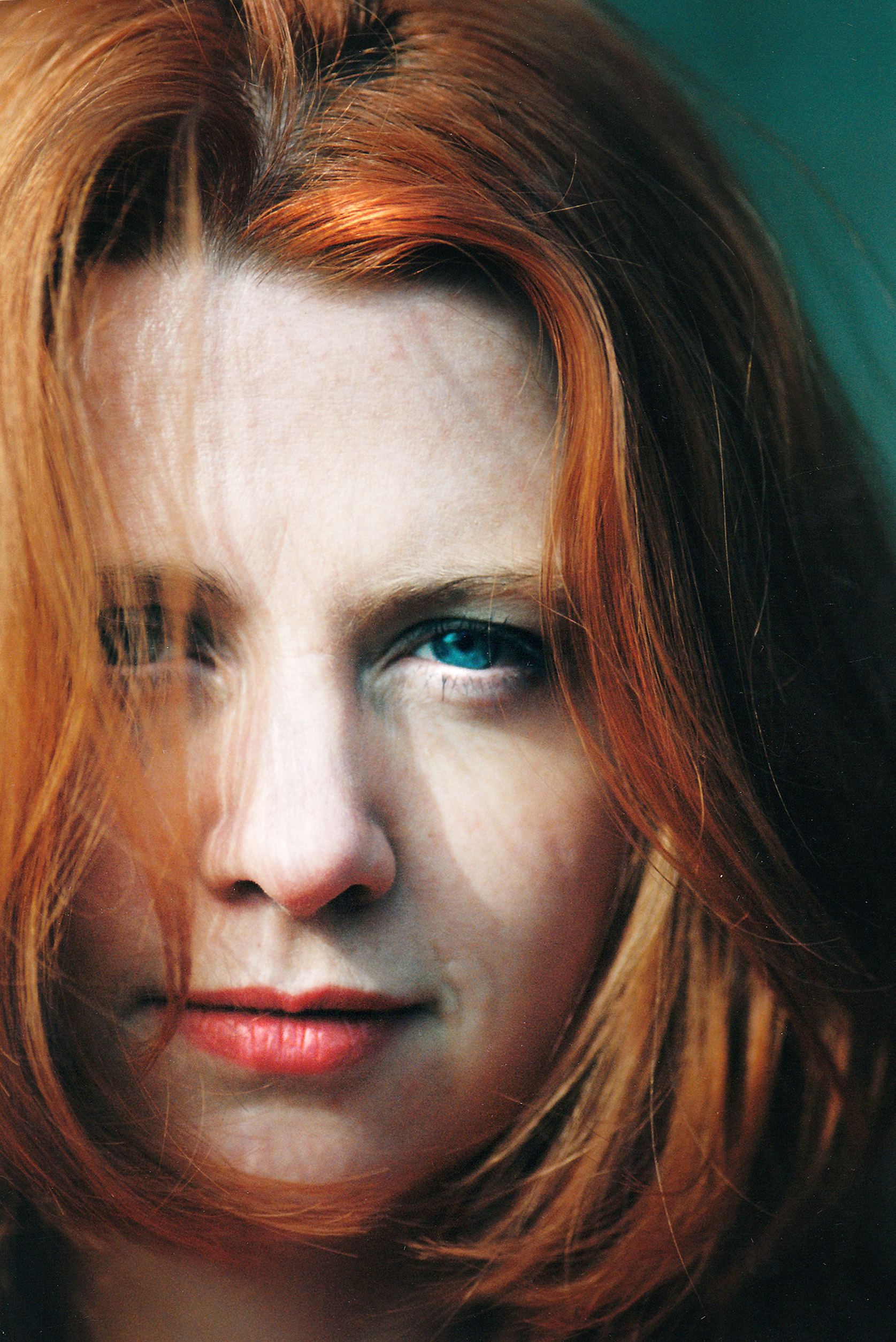
- Born: 6 August 1971 (age 54); Bornem, Belgium
- Occupations: actor, television presenter

Ianka Fleerackers (born 6 August 1971) is a Flemish stage, television and film actress and television presenter.

She landed her first part at age 14, playing a student in the TV series Meester, hij begint weer!. She had starring parts in the TV series Kulderzipken, Flikken, and in LouisLouise where she plays Charlotte De Wilde.

She has two children.

== Filmography ==
=== Film ===
Year	Film	Role	Notes
2005	De Indringer	Tania	
2004	Lisa		Short film
2002	Dju!		Short film
2002	Lisa	Lisa	Short film, in French
2000	Everybody's Famous!	Gaby	
2000	Karel is Karel		
1996	Croque monsieur		Short film
1994	Max	Sofie	

=== Television ===
Year	Series	Role	Notes
2008–2009	LouisLouise	Charlotte De Wilde	
2005, 2007–2009	Flikken	Natalie Mouton / Emma Boon	Played Natalie Mouton in three episodes in 2005, and Emma Boon in 2007–2009.
2006	Witse	Els Guns	
2005	De Kotmadam	Chantal	Season 15, Episode 2.
1998	Windkracht 10	Els	
1998	Hof van Assisen	Leentje Simons	
1995–1997	Kulderzipken	Prinses Prieeltje	
1995	Ons Geluk	Céline	
1994	Niet voor publikatie	Eva	
1993	Meester!	Former pupil	
1992	Copy copy		
1985	Meester, hij begint weer!	Pupil	
