= Eline De Munck =

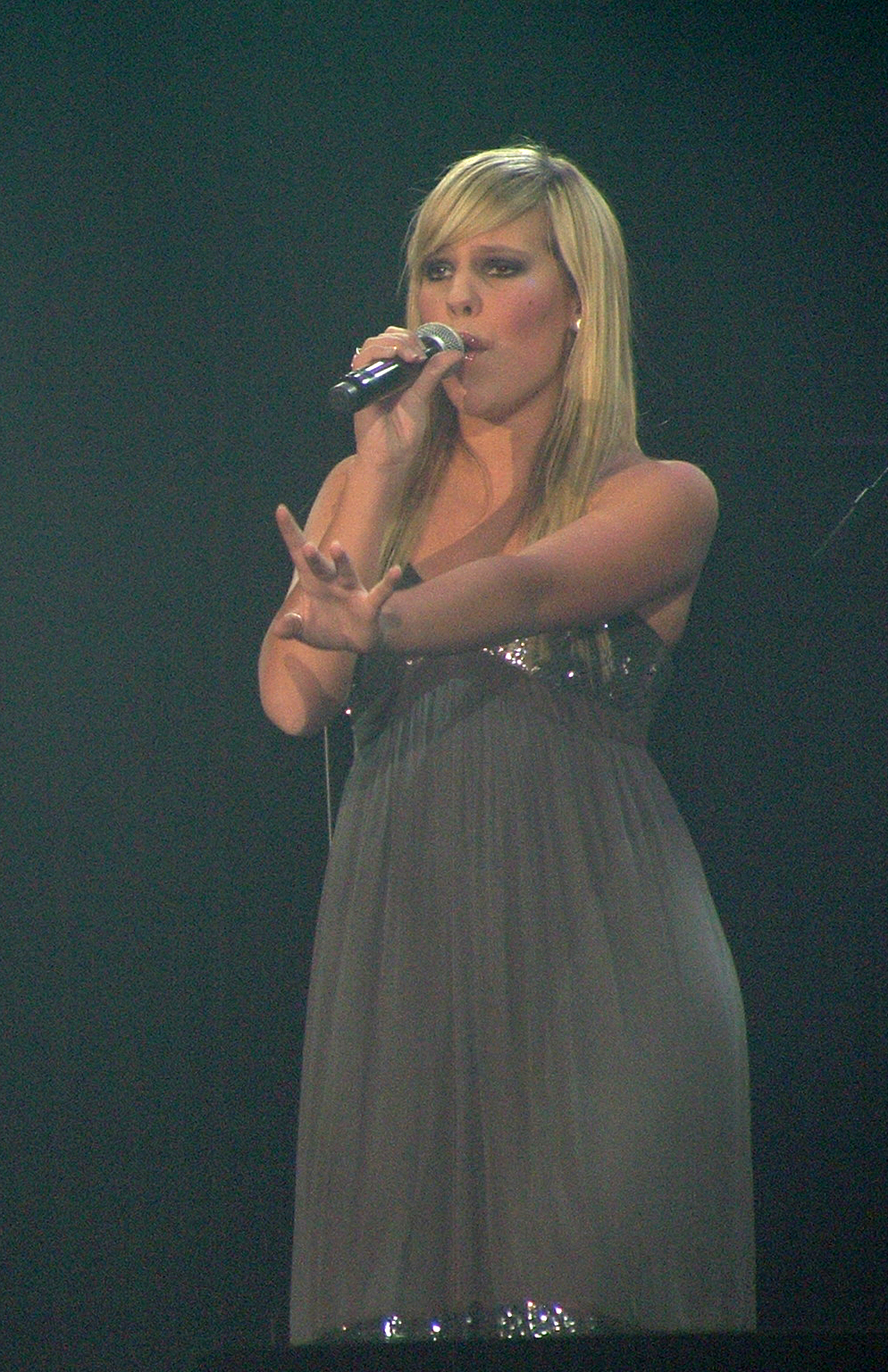
- De Munck performing on tour for Steracteur Sterartiest in 2008.

Background information
- Also known as: Ellektra
- Born: 22 January 1988 (age 38)
- Origin: Belgium
- Genres: Pop
- Occupation: Singer
- Label: Capitol

Eline De Munck (born 22 January 1988), also known by the stage name Ellektra, is a Belgian singer.

De Munck released her first album, More Is More, in 2010. She now appears on Q-music's radio program Que Pasa.

== Discography ==
=== Albums ===
Song	Chart	Peak position
More Is More	Belgian Albums (Ultratop Flanders)	23

=== Singles ===
Song	Chart	Peak position
"Footprints in the Sand"	Belgium (Ultratop 50 Flanders)	7
"Real Love"	Belgium (Ultratop 50 Flanders)	7
"I Hate It But I Love It"	Belgium (Ultratop 50 Flanders)	3
"Do You Really Wanna Be with Me"	Belgium (Ultratop 50 Flanders)	3
"Dance Dance"	Belgium (Ultratop 50 Flanders)	24
