= Flikken =

Belgian Dutch-language crime drama TV series

- DVD box cover of season 1
- Also known as: Flikken Gent
- Genre: Drama; Police
- Created by: Pierre De Clercq; Erwin Provoost
- Written by: Pierre De Clercq; Charles De Weerdt; Rik D'Hiet; Carl Joos; Kees Vroege
- Directed by: Dirk Corthout; Rik Daniëls; Tom Goris; Peter Rondou; Etienne Vervoort
- Country of origin: Belgium
- Original language: Dutch
- No. of seasons: 10
- No. of episodes: 127

Production
- Producer: Ludo Busschots
- Production location: Ghent

Original release
- Network: Eén (VRT); Nederland 1 (TROS)
- Release: 17 October 1999 – 19 April 2009

Related
- Flikken Maastricht; Flikken Rotterdam

Flikken (Belgian Dutch for "Cops") was a popular Flemish-Belgian TV series about a police-department located in Ghent. The show started in 1999 and ended on 19 April 2009. In the series, a team of six police officers solved various crimes, petty crimes as well as organised crime. The series always aimed at showing the policework in a realistic way—though a little personal drama was never far off. Of all the actors that came along during the ten seasons, only Mark Tijsmans (playing Wilfried Pasmans) and Ludo Hellinx (playing Raymond Jacobs) appeared throughout the entire series.

Flikken was produced by the VRT and broadcast on Belgian public channel Eén and TROS in the Netherlands. Flikken is very popular in Belgium and the Netherlands. The show has had very high ratings of up to 1.8 million viewers during the last (10th) season.

Every year the VRT organises the Flikkendag, a family day where the public can meet the actors of the show. There are many games, demonstrations of the real police and other safety organisations and performances of singers (including some of the actors on the show). On 18 April 2009, a special farewell party was organised in Ghent, in which the actors and crew said goodbye to their fans - thousands had assembled to watch the show on stage.

In the Netherlands a spin-off Flikken Maastricht runs from 2007. A second spin-off, called Flikken Rotterdam, was first broadcast in 2016. Both series are still running to this day.

== Media adaptations ==
In 2005 a video game came out based on the series, Flikken game - De Achtervolging. It received bad reviews for its "unflashy" style.

A second video game, Flikken Game 2: Moord in Hotel Ganda, was released in 2007. The game is a localised version of the 2006 Swedish game Dollar, written by crime writer Liza Marklund.

In 2010 the TV series was adapted into an action comic, written by Zaki Dewaele and drawn by Michaël Vincent.

== Episode ==
Season	No. of episodes	Runtime Belgium	Runtime Netherlands	Script
1	13	1999 - 2000	2001	Pierre De Clercq
2	13	2000 - 2001	2002	Pierre De Clercq
3	13	2001	2003	Pierre De Clercq (episode 32 Wim Danckaert)
4	13	2002	2004	Pierre De Clercq (episode 43, 47, 49 Hilde Pallen)
5	13	2003	2005	Rik D'hiet & Hilde Pallen & Carl Joos
6	13	2004	2006	Rik D'hiet & Hilde Pallen & Carl Joos & Geert Bouckaert & Frank de Bruyn
7	13	2005 - 2006	2007	Charles De Weerdt & Rik D'hiet & Carl Joos & Johan Heselmans & Geert Bouckaert
8	13	2007	2008	Rik D'hiet
9	13	2008	2011	Carl Joos (episode 105 Pierre De Clercq, episode 112 & 113 Charles De Weerdt)
10	10	2009	2011	Pierre De Clercq & Carl Joos & Charles De Weerdt & Kees Vroege & Rik D'hiet

== Cast ==
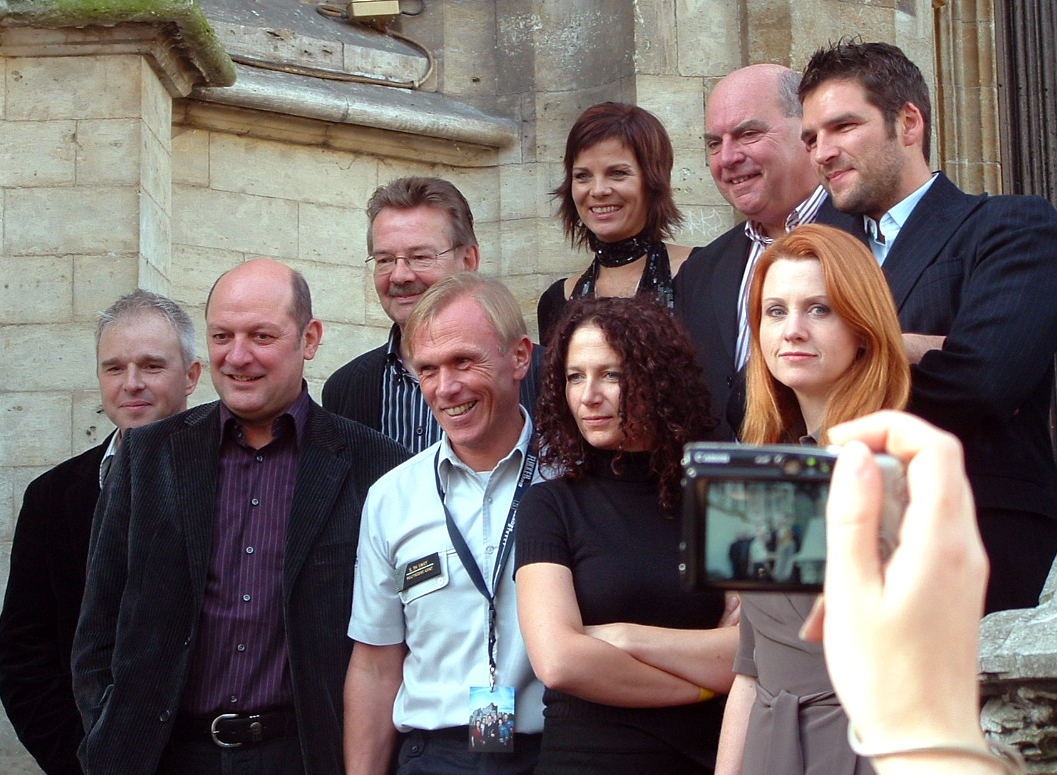
The cast of Flikken in 2009

Main
Guest
Recurring
Other person
Not in series

=== Main ===
Actor	Personage	Season									
Actor	Personage	1	2	3	4	5	6	7	8	9	10
Ludo Hellinx	Raymond Jacobs	Main	Main	Main	Main	Main	Main	Main	Main	Main	Main
Mark Tijsmans	Wilfried Pasmans	Main	Main	Main	Main	Main	Main	Main	Main	Main	Main
Andrea Croonenberghs	Britt Michiels	Main	Main	Main	Main	Main	Main	5			1
Axel Daeseleire	Ben Vanneste	Main	Main	Main	4	1					
Joke Devynck	Tony Dierickx	Main	Main	Main	1						
Cahit Ölmez	Selattin Ateş	Main	Main	Main							
Hubert Damen	Daniël Deprez	Main									
Wim Danckaert	Kris Geysen	6	Main	3			1		5		
Katelijne Verbeke	Nadine Vanbruane			Main	Main	5			4		
Maarten Bosmans	Bruno Soetaert			Gerrit	Main	Main	Main	Main	Main	2	
Werner De Smedt	Nick Debbaut †				Main	Main	Main	Main			
Ann Ceurvels	Sofie Beeckman †				Main	5					
Jo De Meyere	John Nauwelaerts					Main	Main	Main	Main	Main	Main
Rebecca Huys	Merel Vanneste	35				Main	Main	Main	2		
Tine Van den Brande	Lieselot Winter						18				
Boudewijn de Groot	Robert Nieuwman						Main				
Tania Kloek	Tina Demeester								3		
Ianka Fleerackers	Emma Boon							Nathalie Mouton	12	Main	Main
Pascale Michiels	Cat Reyniers					Roos Diepenbeek			12	Main	Main
Roel Vanderstukken	Michiel Dewaele								8	Main	Main

=== Recurring ===
Actor	Personage	Season									
Actor	Personage	1	2	3	4	5	6	7	8	9	10
Kadèr Gürbüz	Mihriban Ates	27									
Margot de Ridder	Dorien De Bondt	20									
Hugo van den Berghe	Taverniers	7									
Veerle Malschaert	Carla Desseyn		45								
Wim van der Grijn	Sam de Groot			6							
Bert Cosemans	Johan Van Lancker	Patrick Levie			16						
Rik Geuns	Simon Van Lancker				13						
Danny Timmermans	Dominique De Leeuw					14					
Pierre Callens	Anthony Van Reeth					3		3			
Bart Slegers	Tommy De Smit						9				
Karin Tanghe	Marianne Van Dijck						Lieve Mertens	25			
Jonathan Raman	Rik Jacobs							7			
Michael De Cock	Jan Beele					Olivier Cools			11		
Mathias Sercu	Staf Demotte	Dany De Volder							19		
