= Axel Daeseleire =

Belgian actor (born 1968)

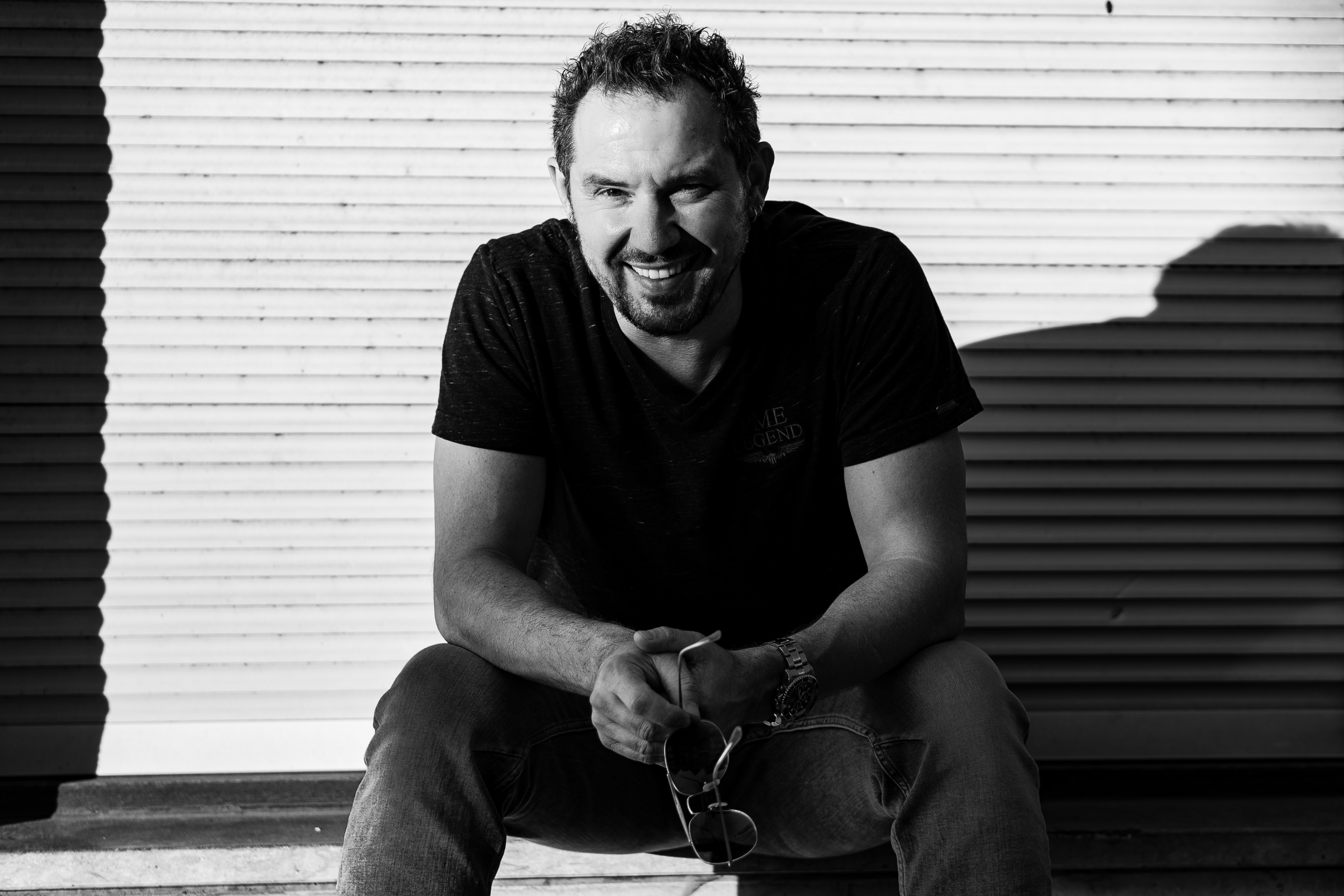
- Axel Daeseleire (2020)

Axel Dorothée Marc Daeseleire (born 26 October 1968) is a Belgian actor. He is best known for his portrayal of Jan Verplancke in Belgian television series Matroesjka's, and movies such as Team Spirit.

== Filmography ==
- Ad Fundum (1993, film)
- She Good Fighter (1995, film)
- Nonkel Jef (1995, TV)
- Thuis (1996, TV)as Robbe
- Terug naar Oosterdonk (1997, TV) as Tuur
- Diamant (1997, TV)
- Dief (1997, film) as Frans Van Reeth
- Flikken (1999-2003, TV) as Ben Vanneste
- Team Spirit (2000, film) as Franky Leemans
- Dennis (2002, TV) as Dennis Denissen
- Team Spirit 2 (2003, film) as Franky Leemans
- Kinderen Van Dewindt (2005, TV) as Bart Dewindt
- De Indringer (2005) as Wes Moons
- Matroesjka's (2005, TV) as Jan Verplancke
- Kinderen Van Dewindt (2006, TV) as Bart Dewindt
- De Hel van Tanger (2006, film) as Wim Moreels
- Windkracht 10 - Koksijde Rescue (2006) as Koen
- Kinderen Van Dewindt (2007, TV) as Bart Dewindt
- Matroesjka's 2 (2007, TV) as Jan Verplancke
- Vermist - De Serie (2008, TV) as Eric Coppens
- LouisLouise (2008, 2009, TV) as Louis De Roover & Jeroen
- Goesting (2010, TV)
- Vermist - De Serie II (2010, TV) as Eric Coppens
- Wolven (2012, TV) as Thomas Verhaege
- Wolf (Voorjaar 2010, film)
- Zot van A. (2010, film)
- Witse (2011, TV-gastrol) as Gunther Selleslags
- Vermist - De Serie III+IV (2011-2012, TV) as Eric Coppens
- Groenten uit Balen (2011, film) as Marcel
- Zone Stad (2011, TV-gastrol) as Patrick Libotte
- Blijf! (2011, film)
- Aspe (2011, TV-gastrol) as Herman Dardien
- Penoza (2017, TV) as Marcus Vos
- Gangsta (2018) as Stijn
