= Peeters =

Peeters (Dutch pronunciation: [ˈpeːtərs]) is a Dutch-language patronymic surname, equivalent to Peters. It is the most common surname in Belgium (33,275 people), and is particularly common in the province of Antwerp, but also in Flemish Brabant and Belgian Limburg. Notable people with the surname include:

== Artists ==
- Bonaventura Peeters the Elder (1614–1652), Flemish marine and landscape painter
- Bonaventura Peeters the Younger (1641–1702), Flemish marine and landscape painter
- Catharina Peeters (1615–1676), Flemish marine painter
- Clara Peeters (1594–1657), Flemish still life painter
- Gillis Peeters the Elder (1612 – 1653), Flemish painter
- Frank Peeters (born 1947), Belgian fine art photographer
- Hendrik Peeters (1815–1869), Belgian sculptor
- Henk Peeters (1925–2013), Dutch artist
- Jacob Balthasar Peeters (c. 1655 – after 1721), Flemish painter
- Jan Peeters I (1624–1677), Flemish marine painter
- Jozef Peeters (1895–1960), Belgian painter, engraver and graphic artist
- Maarten Peeters (c. 1500–1566), Flemish painter and print publisher

== Athletes ==
- Alfons Peeters (1943–2015), Belgian footballer
- Bob Peeters (born 1974), Belgian football striker
- Cathelijn Peeters (born 1996), Dutch track and field athlete
- Francine Peeters (born 1957), Belgian long-distance runner
- Frans Peeters (born 1956), Belgian sports shooter
- Huguette Peeters (born 1936), Belgian swimmer
- Jacky Peeters (born 1969), Belgian football defender
- Jelena Peeters (born 1985), Belgian speed skater
- Kevin Peeters (born 1987), Belgian road bicycle racer
- Ludo Peeters (born 1953), Belgian road bicycle racer
- Maurice Peeters (1882–1957), Dutch track cyclist
- Pete Peeters (born 1957), Canadian ice hockey goalie
- Rob Peeters (born 1985), Belgian bicycle racer
- Rocky Peeters (born 1979), Belgian footballer
- Sara Peeters (born 1985), Belgian road bicycle racer
- Stef Peeters (born 1992), Belgian footballer
- Wilfried Peeters (born 1964), Belgian road bicycle racer
- Willem Peeters (born 1953), Belgian road bicycle racer
- Willie Peeters (born 1965), Dutch mixed martial artist
- Wim Peeters (1925–2011), South African sports shooter
- Yannick Peeters (born 1996), Belgian cyclo-cross cyclist

== Musicians ==
- Bart Peeters (born 1959), Belgian musician and television presenter
- Flor Peeters (1903–1986), Belgian organist and teacher
- Marcel Peeters (born 1926), Belgian composer, conductor, and clarinetist
- Sieneke Peeters (born 1992), Dutch singer

== Politicians ==
- Jan Peeters (born 1963), Belgian politician
- Kris Peeters (born 1962), Belgian politician
- Leo Peeters (born 1950), Belgian politician

== Scientists and academics ==
- Harry Peeters (1931–2012), Dutch historian and psychologist
- Nand Peeters (1918–1998), Belgian obstetrician and gynecologist
- Theo Peeters (1943–2018), Belgian neurolinguist

== Writers ==
- Barbara Peeters, American film director and screenwriter
- Benoît Peeters (born 1956), French comic writer, novelist and critic
- Carel Peeters (born 1944), Dutch literary critic, writer and editor
- Elvis Peeters (born 1957), Belgian writer and former rock musician
- Frederik Peeters (born 1974), Swiss comic writer
- Koen Peeters (born 1959), Belgian writer
- Sophia Elizabeth Peeters (1833–1916), Dutch/Flemish ethnologist who published Wase folklore

== Others ==
- Clive Peeters, a former Australian retailer
- Filip Peeters (born 1962), Belgian actor
- Peeters (publishing company)
