= Laurens van der Hem =

Dutch lawyer and map and landscape print collector (1621-1678)

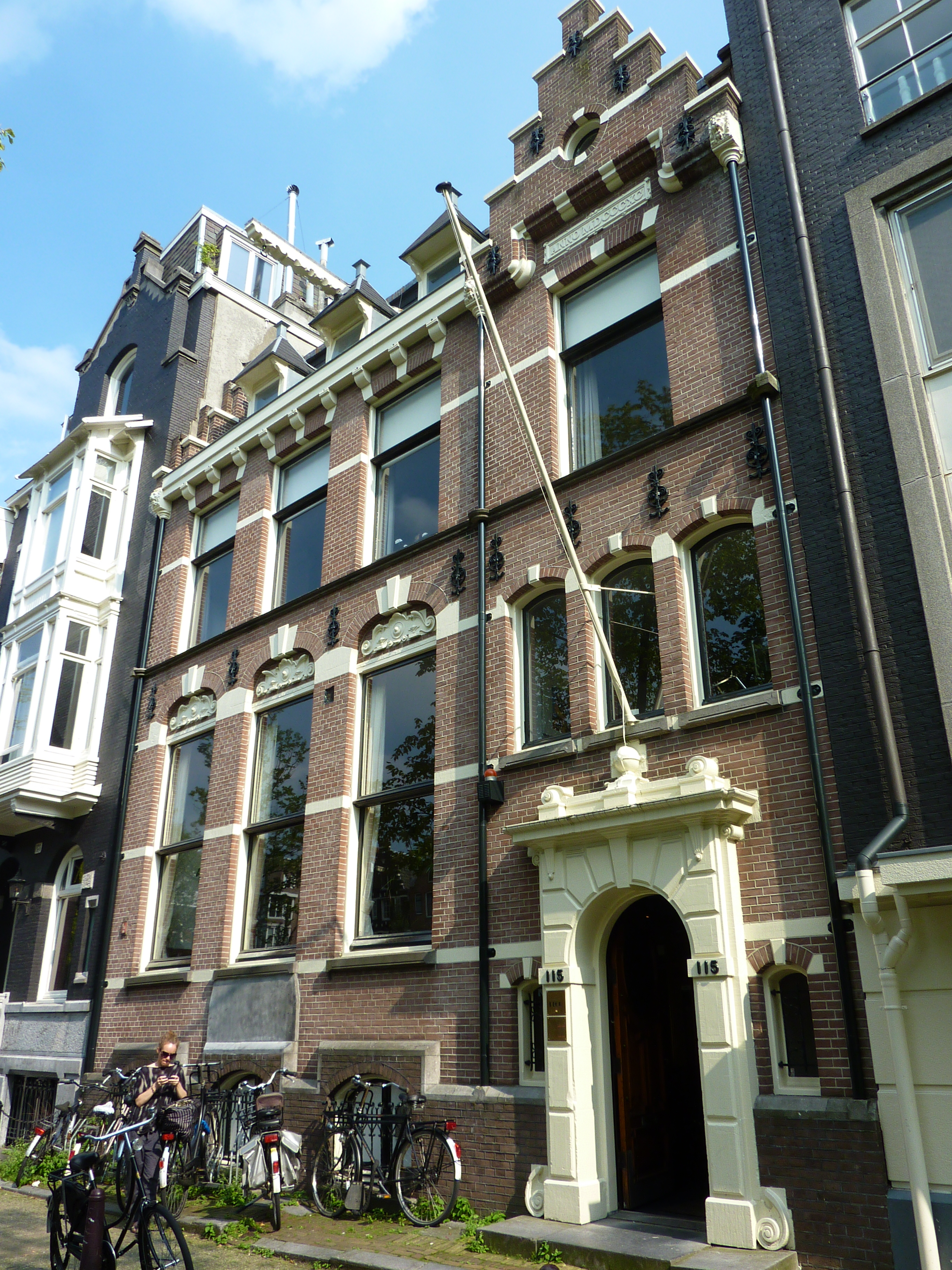
Herengracht 115, former address of Laurens van der Hem, in 1890 unrecognizably rebuilt after a design by Hendrik Petrus Berlage

Laurens van der Hem (1621–1678), was a Dutch lawyer and a collector of maps and landscape prints. He is known today for commissioning his meticulously thorough personal version of the Atlas Maior, itself a major work of cartography and art published by his contemporary and friend Joan Blaeu.

== Biography ==
Van der Hem was born in Amsterdam as the son of the lawyer Ysbrand van der Hem and his wife Geertrui Spiegel, the daughter of the poet Hendrik Laurenszoon Spiegel. His uncles on his father's side were famous in their own right; his uncle Herman was a gifted draughtsman, uncle Hendrik became a lawyer who acquired a large library, and uncle Arend was knighted by Ferdinand II in 1620, and called himself Jonker Arnold van der Hem, Ridder, Heer van Nedersteyn, Corl en Hilteprant.

According to the Netherlands Institute for Art History (RKD), Van der Hem travelled in Italy, and on his return married and settled on the Herengracht, an elite residential area on one of the three major canals of Amsterdam. There he collected the material he used to supplement his personal copy of the Atlas Maior. His copy of the atlas is now known as the Eugenius-atlas or the Atlas Blauw-van der Hem and is today kept at the Austrian National Library in Vienna.

== Blaeu's Atlas Maior ==
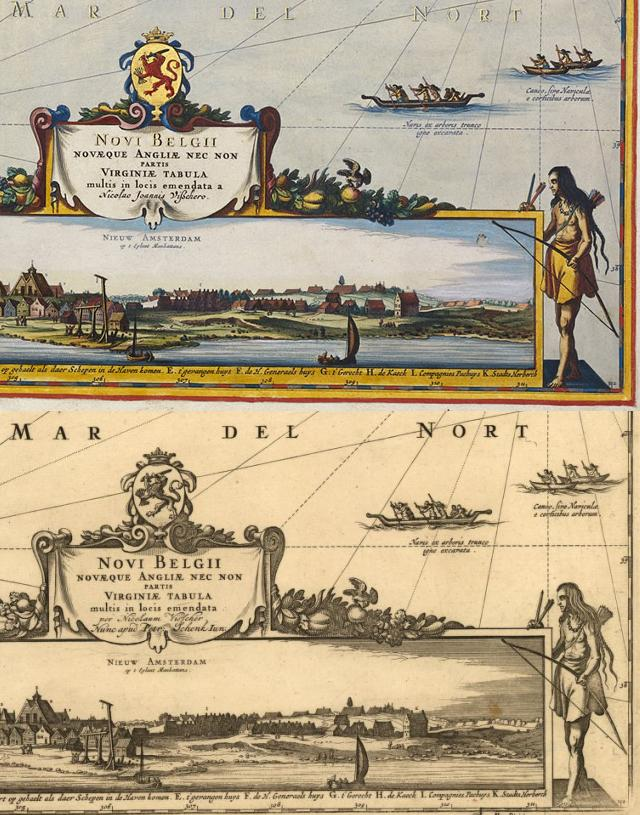
Comparison of two versions of the map of New England titled "Novi Belgii" from the Atlas Maior. The top version was hand colored by Dirk Janszoon van Santen for Laurens van der Hem's personal copy; the lower version shows how it appeared in the version printed for publication by Joan Blaeu.

The Atlas Maior was popular in Amsterdam when it was published in installments starting in 1649 (last volume in 1673) in 11 gold-embossed volumes. To save money, collectors could purchase it plain without handpainted embellishments. However, Laurens van der Hem went a step further and ordered his maps unbound, and proceeded to have Blaeu's best professional map-finisher, Dirk Jansz van Santen, colour them by hand.

The eleven volumes of Blaeu's atlas form the main body of the Van der Hem's personal copy, but they also include a number of additions including a volume of secret maps created by the Dutch East India Company (VOC) that were never part of the original publication. Van der Hem's entire collection consists of 46 volumes with four supplements and a portfolio of loose maps, which together include over 2,400 full colour maps and drawings of ports, towers, and landscapes by renowned Dutch artists such as Andries Beeckman, Gaspar Bouttats, Jan Peeters I, Bonaventura Peeters the Elder, Jacques Callot and Cornelis Gerritsz Decker.

Some artists who travelled and brought back drawings made on their travels also had their works included, such as Lambert Doomer, Jan Hackaert, Adriaen Matham, Roelant Savery, Willem Schellinks, and Reinier Nooms, also named as 'Zeeman'. Southwest France was drawn by Laurens' brother Herman, who died a bachelor in Bordeaux. Drawings of Italy and Sicily were described by Van der Helm himself.

== Curiosity cabinet ==
Van der Hem's unique map collection became something of a tourist attraction during his lifetime, and several famous people who visited Amsterdam at the time also visited Van der Hem's home to view the collection. One of these was Cosimo III, the Grand Duke of Tuscany, who visited the Herengracht on 2 January 1668.

On 9 March 1711, the German travelling scholar Zacharias Conrad von Uffenbach paid a visit to Laurens' daughter Agatha (Jungfer van der Gemm) to view her Blauischen Atlas, for which the Comte d'Avaux had offered her 20,000 guilders, but which she valued at 50,000 guilders. Conrad von Uffenbach was reportedly highly impressed by the colouring done by the master he referred to as "Dirck Janssen van Santen".

== Eugenius atlas ==
After Van der Hem's death in 1678, the atlas was inherited by his wife and after her death by his daughter Agatha and then his other daughter Agnes. After Agnes' death in 1712, Van der Hem's grandson sold it in an auction in 1730 to Prince Eugene of Savoy, a stadtholder in the Austrian-controlled Southern Netherlands, for 22,000 florins. After the purchase, the atlas came to be known as the Eugenius-atlas. Prince Eugene transported it to Vienna where it remains to this day, and is one of the prized possessions in the collection of the Austrian National Library.

The atlas was nearly lost in a fire in 1992 and has since been digitised and added to the UNESCO Memory of the World Register in 2003. In 2011 a facsimile project was completed.

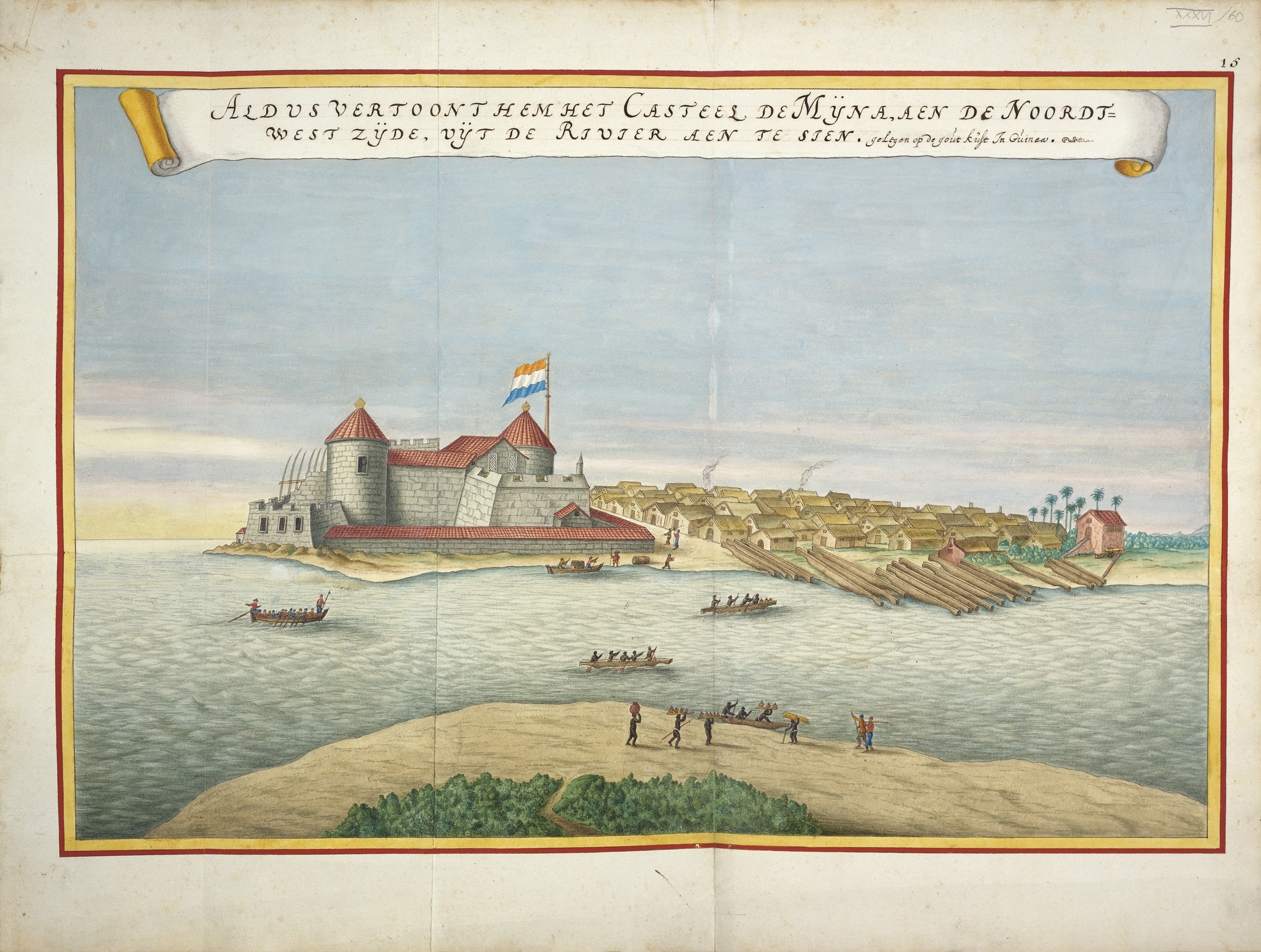
Elmina Castle on the coast of modern-day Ghana

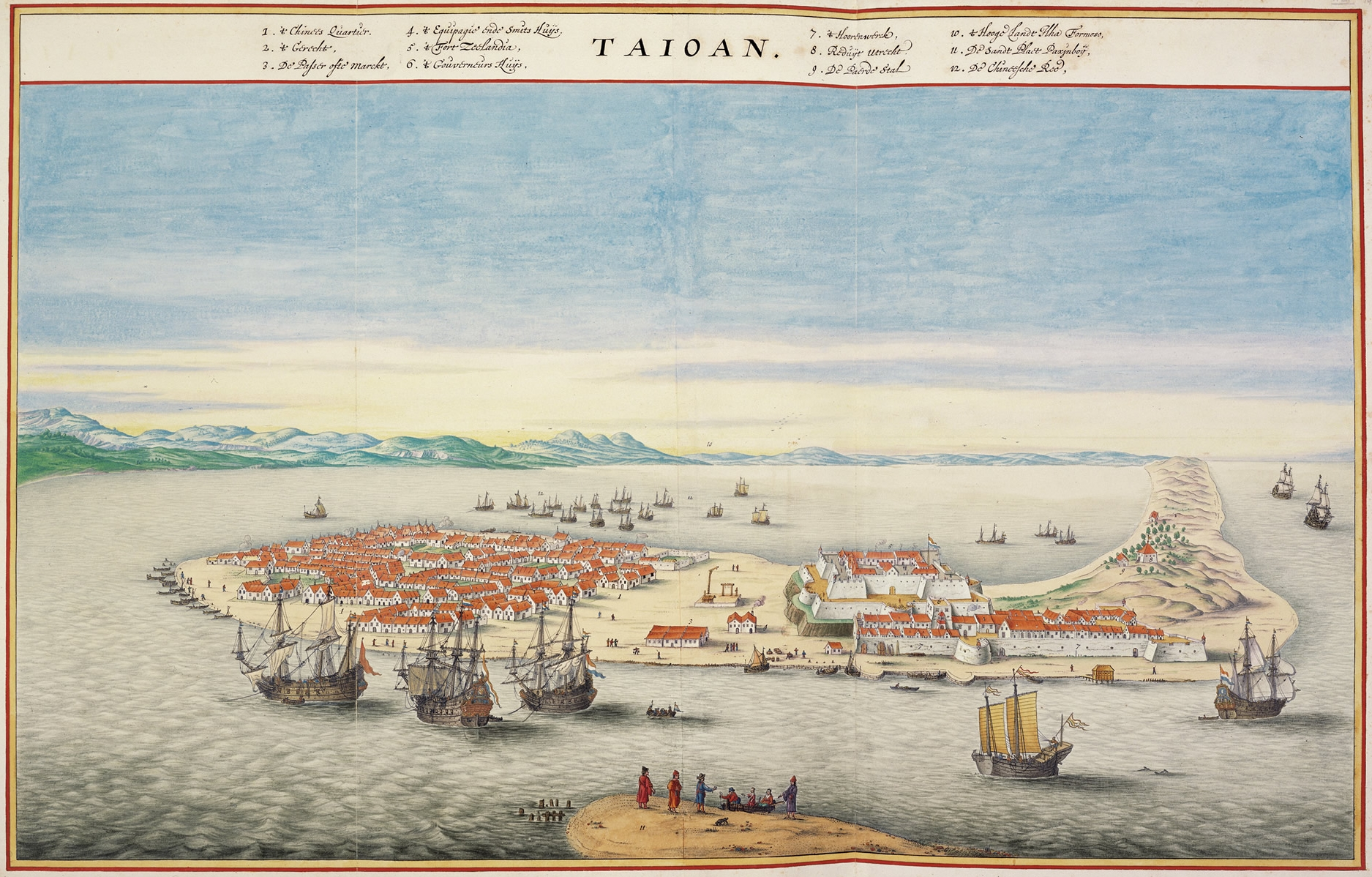
Fort Zeelandia, Dutch Formosa (modern-day Taiwan)

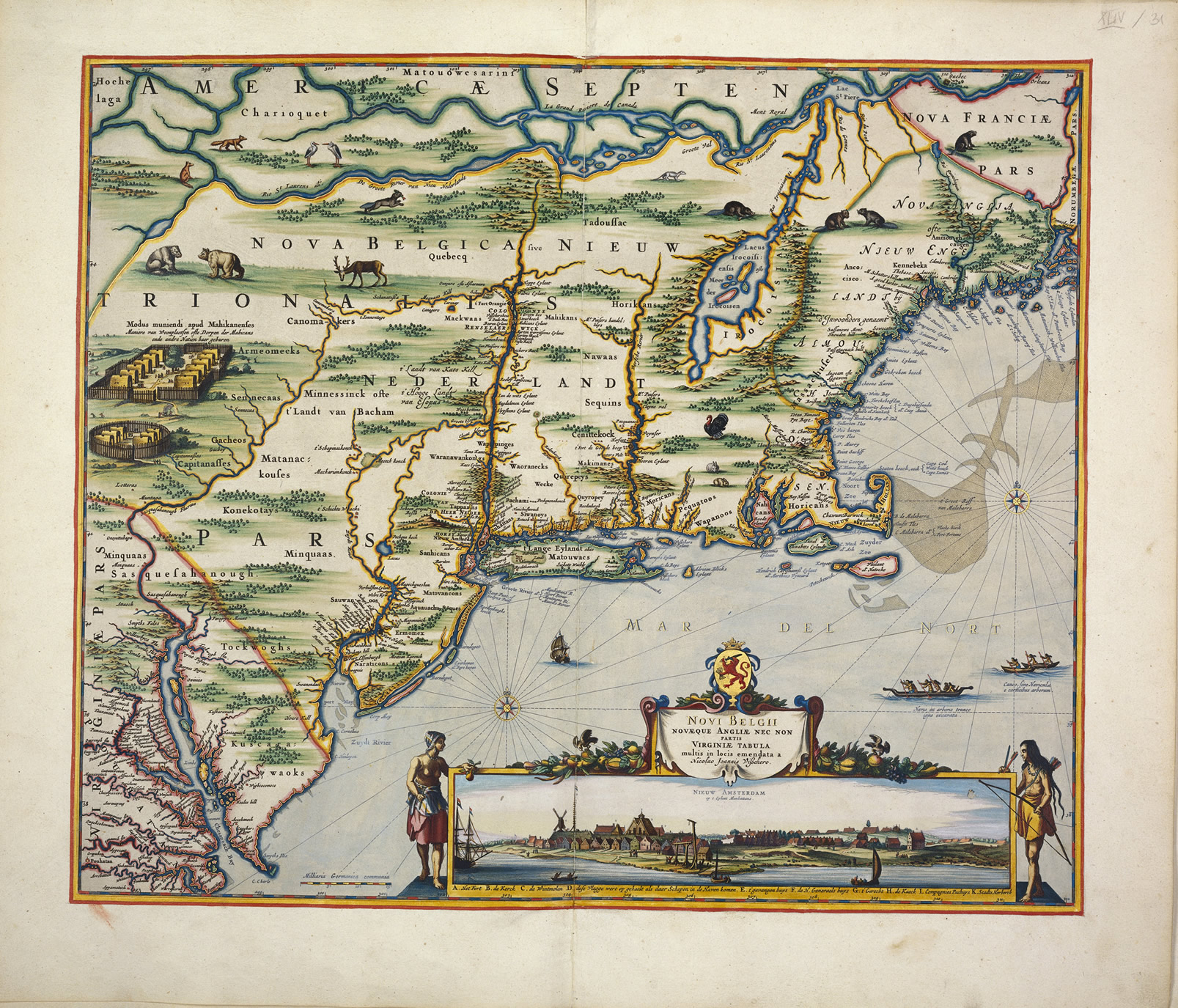
Map of New Netherland, with New England

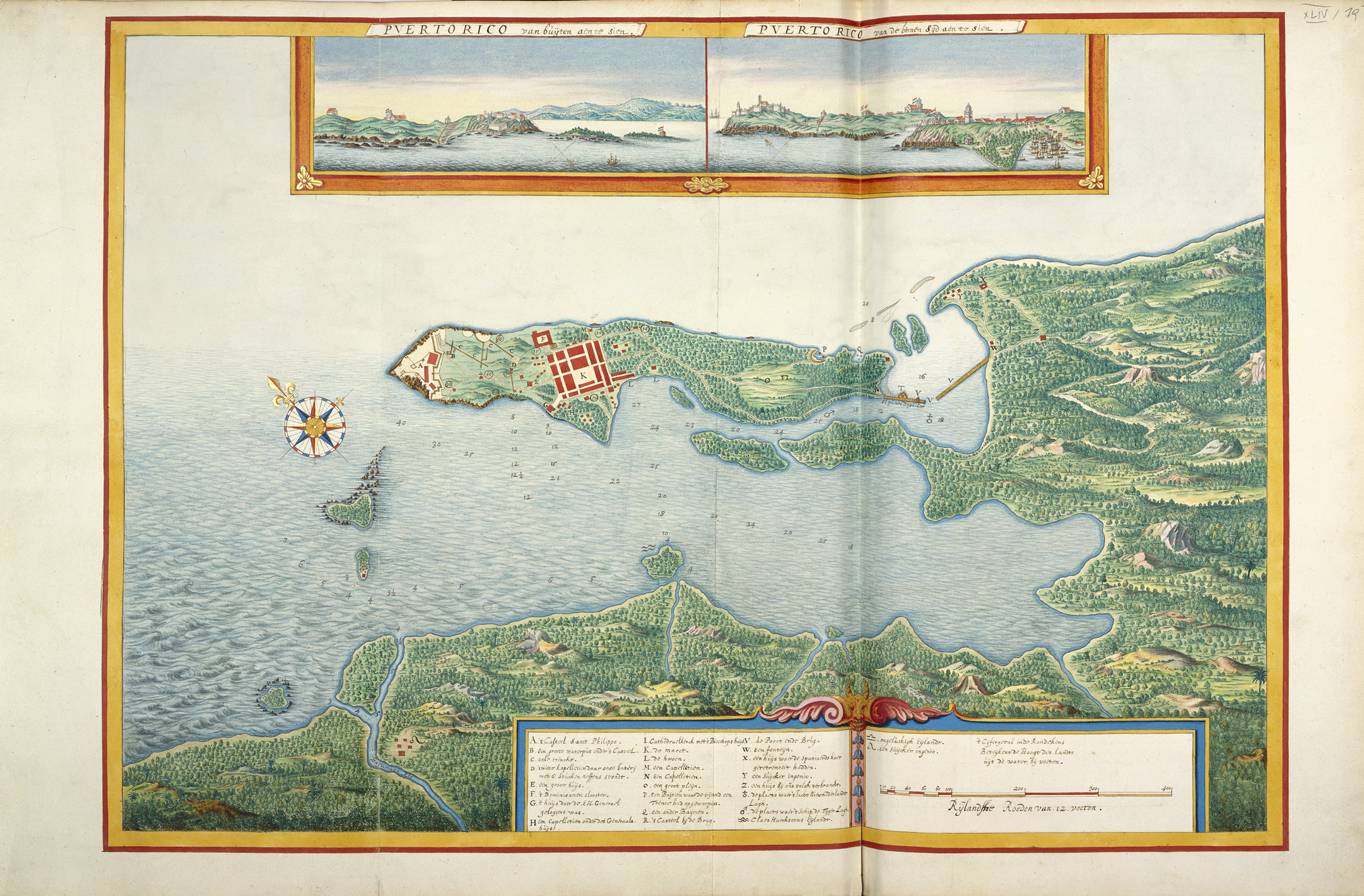
Map of Puerto Rico
