= Stijn Van Opstal =

Belgian actor (born 1976)

- Born: 1976 (age 48–49); Belgium
- Occupation: Actor

Stijn Van Opstal (born 1976) is a Flemish actor.

He graduated in 1998 from the Studio Herman Teirlinck, the same year as Tom Dewispelaere, Ben Segers and Geert Van Rampelberg, with whom he founded the theatre company Olympique Dramatique. In the theatre, he acted in Kaspar, De gebroeders Leeuwenhart, De geruchten, Adams appels and Bij het kanaal naar links.

He acted in the feature films S. and Dossier K. and played a role with his theatre companions in the television series De Parelvissers. His first television appearance was in the series Recht op Recht. He also had a recurring role as the criminal Dimitri Alva in the sixth season of the VTM television series Zone Stad. In the spring of 2013, he acted in the VIER series Met man en macht. He also played roles in several short films.

Stijn Van Opstal is in a relationship with Sarah Vangeel; they have two children together. Van Opstal grew up in Beerse.

== Television and film ==
=== TV series ===
- Windkracht 10 (1998) – Fireman
- Recht op Recht (2001–02) – Stef Molenaar / Tommy Van Lebbeek
- De vloek van Vlimovost (2006)
- De Parelvissers (2006) – Lucas Blommaert
- Zone Stad (2010–11) – Dimitri Alva
- Salamander (2013) – Meneer Walters
- Met man en macht (2013) – Ludo Jacobs
- Safety First (2013) – Erik
- Ontspoord (2013) – Bernard
- Tabula Rasa (2017) – Benoit

=== Short films ===
- Striker Bob (1997) – Tony
- Fade out (2000) – Steve
- Dialing the Devil (2001)
- Blind Date (2001)
- Het ruikt hier naar stront (2006) – Cliff Heylen
- Nowhere Man (2008) – Man with beard
- Een kleine duw (2009) – Meester Wim
- Rosa, zusje van Anna (2012) – Vader

== Films ==
- S. (1998)
- Dossier K. (2009) – scientist
- De premier (2016) – Driver of the Prime Minister
