= John Peeters =

Flemish painter in England

John Peeters (né Jan Pieters; c. 1666/7–c. 1727) was a Flemish painter, active in England for about forty-two years. He was generally known in England as John Peeters or John Peters.

== Life ==
John Peeters, born at Antwerp—probably in 1666 or 1667—was related to the eminent marine painter Bonaventura Peeters. Almost all that is known of him comes from the notes of his contemporary and friend, the writer George Vertue. Vertue notes that he studied painting at Antwerp under 'Eckhart an history painter a man of good esteem', and in 1685 came to England at the age of eighteen with a recommendation to Sir Godfrey Kneller.

Peeters worked with Kneller for several years, being one of Kneller's chief drapery painters until 1712, when he left, and devoted himself chiefly to mending and repairing damaged pictures and drawings. He also worked for other painters, 'but chiefly employed himself in drawings and the mending or repairing of damaged or old pictures, in which he was very skilful having great knowledge in the hands of several famous Italian but especially Flemish masters'. From his success in this line he obtained the nickname of 'Doctor Peeters'. He was also a skilled copyist, especially of the works of Rubens.

Peeters seems to have been well connected both socially and professionally with the London art world, as a member of the artists' Rose and Crown Club in London. He seems to have enjoyed a particularly close friendship with Vertue, a fellow member of the club, who spoke highly of his merits as a teacher; Vertue even referred to Peeters as 'my grandmother'.

Peeters was a man of a lively disposition and improvident nature, a 'lusty man of a free open temper a lover of good company and his bottle', who never married. According to Vertue, after suffering much from the gout, he died in London in September 1727, and was buried in St. Martin's-in-the-Fields. There is, however, no record to corroborate this claim.
