= Tabula Rasa (TV series) =

2017 Flemish-language television series

- Series poster
- Genre: Thriller
- Created by: Veerle Baetens; Malin-Sarah Gozin
- Starring: Veerle Baetens; Stijn Van Opstal; Jeroen Perceval
- Country of origin: Belgium
- Original language: Flemish
- No. of seasons: 1
- No. of episodes: 9

Production
- Running time: 60 min.

Original release
- Network: Eén
- Release: October 29, 2017

Tabula Rasa is a nine-part 2017 Belgian Flemish-language TV series created by Veerle Baetens and Malin-Sarah Gozin and starring Veerle Baetens, Stijn Van Opstal and Jeroen Perceval. The plot revolves around Mie, a young woman with amnesia who is locked up in a secure psychiatric hospital.

It was released on October 29, 2017, on Eén.

== Cast ==
- Veerle Baetens as Annemie D'Haeze
- Stijn Van Opstal as Benoit D'Haeze
- Jeroen Perceval as Thomas De Geest
- Gene Bervoets as Inspecteur Jacques Wolkers
- Natali Broods as Dr. Mommaerts
- Cécile Enthoven as Romy D'Haeze
- Ruth Beeckmans as Karen
- Hilde Van Mieghem as Rita
- Peter Van den Begin as Vronsky
- Lynn Van Royen as Nikki
- François Beukelaers as Walter
- Marc Peeters as Boswachter
- Tom Audenaert as Olivier
- Gregory Frateur as Jackson
- Bilall Fallah as Mozes
- Jan Debski as Schilpadman met bokaalbril

== Release ==
Tabula Rasa was released on October 29, 2017 on Eén. The series was added as a Netflix Original series in all regions except the United Kingdom on March 15, 2018 but removed in April 2023.
