= Catharina Peeters =

Dutch artist (1615–1676)

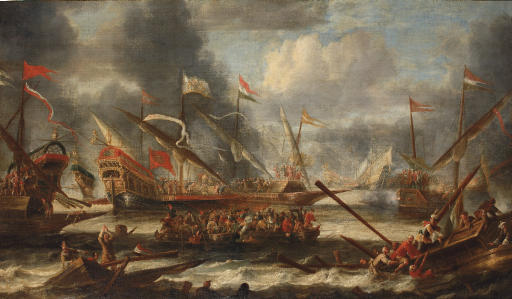
A naval battle on choppy waters, 1652

Catharina Peeters (1615 – 1676) was a Flemish Baroque painter. She was the sister of Bonaventuur Peeters, Jan Peeters I, and Gillis Peeters. They were all Flemish Baroque painters noted for painting seascapes.

Few details of her life are known. According to the RKD, she was taught to paint by her brothers. She is mentioned in Cornelis de Bie's book on painters in his chapter on noteworthy female painters. She is mentioned in Van der Aa as a fruit painter who was possibly the same person as Clara Peeters. Whether the two women were related is unknown.
