= Recht op Recht =

- Genre: lawyer series, crime
- Starring: Veerle Dobbelaere; Filip Peeters; Tuur De Weert; Stany Crets; Robbie Cleiren; Blanka Heirman; Pascale Michiels; Damiaan De Schrijver
- Country of origin: Belgium
- Original language: Dutch
- No. of seasons: 4
- No. of episodes: 45

Production
- Running time: 50 minutes

Original release
- Network: Eén
- Release: December 27, 1999 – February 7, 2002

Recht op Recht is a Belgian television series produced by the Flemish channel Eén. 45 episodes were aired between 1998 and 2002.

== Story ==
The story is set in and around the law office "Leduc and Partners" which is led by Paul Emile Leduc. Jurist Chris Haagdoorn is one of the employees. She is assisted by Hugo Van Eyck a former policeman. As lawyers are not allowed to do investigations, Hugo acts as a type of detective although his official position is administrative. Other employees are student Luc Lievens, Gabriël Nukerke and Jessie Vinck.

== Cast ==
- Chris Haagdoorn - Veerle Dobbelaere
- Hugo Van Eyck - Filip Peeters
- Gabriël Nukerke - Stany Crets (season 1 & 2)
- Luc Lievens - Robbie Cleiren
- Paul Emile Leduc - Tuur De Weert
- Louise Haagdoorn - Blanka Heirman
- Jessie Vinck - Pascale Michiels
- Stanny Michel - Damiaan De Schrijver
