= Gillis Peeters the Elder =

Flemish painter

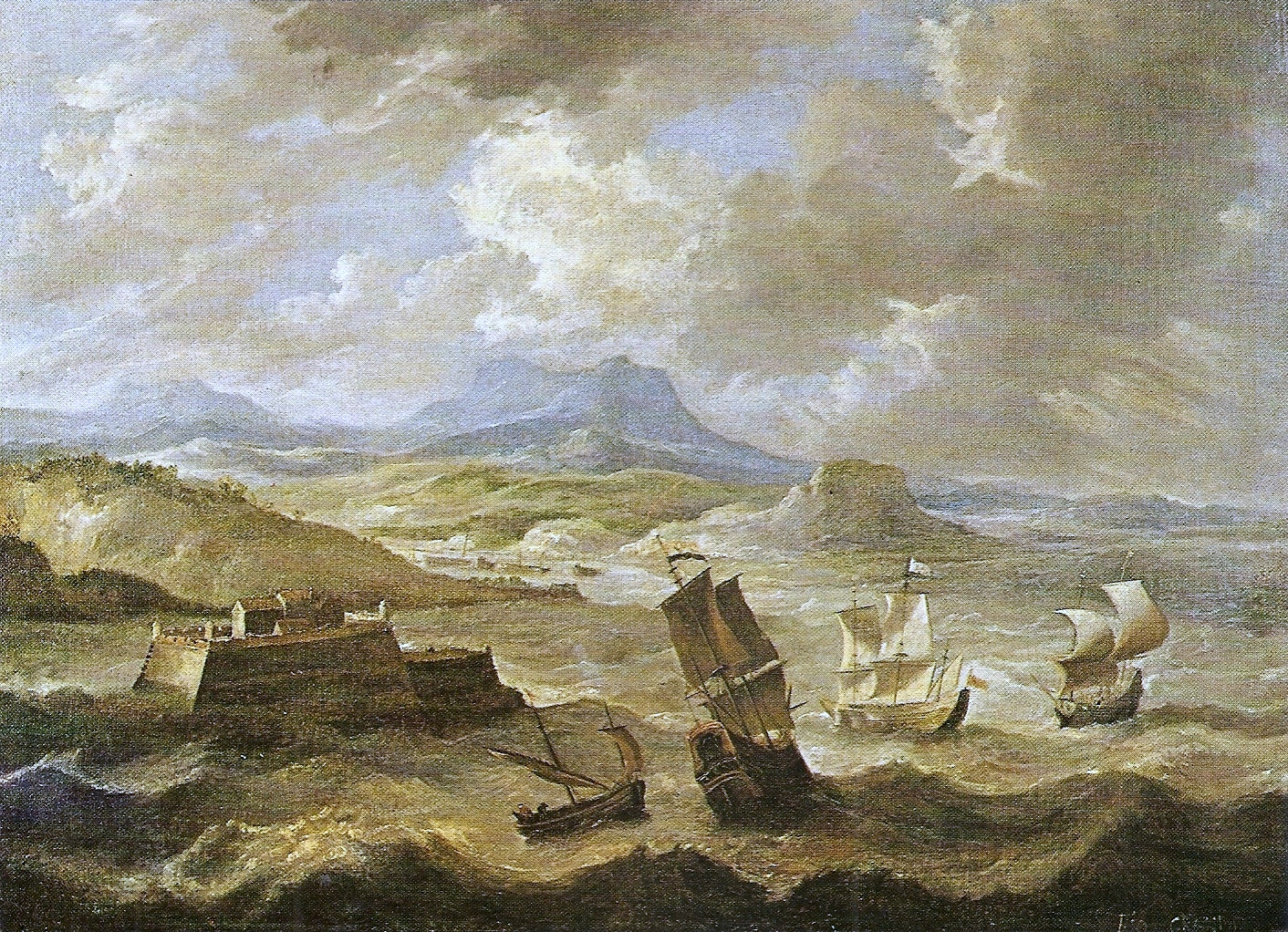
Forte dos Reis Magos

Gillis Peeters (1612–1653), was a Flemish painter, draughtsman and engraver who contributed to the development of marine art and landscape painting in Flanders.

== Life ==
He was born in Antwerp. He was the older brother of the marine painters Catharina, Jan I and Bonaventura Peeters. He is recorded in 1631 as the pupil of the Dutch flower painter Anthony Claesz the Younger who had left his home country in 1629.

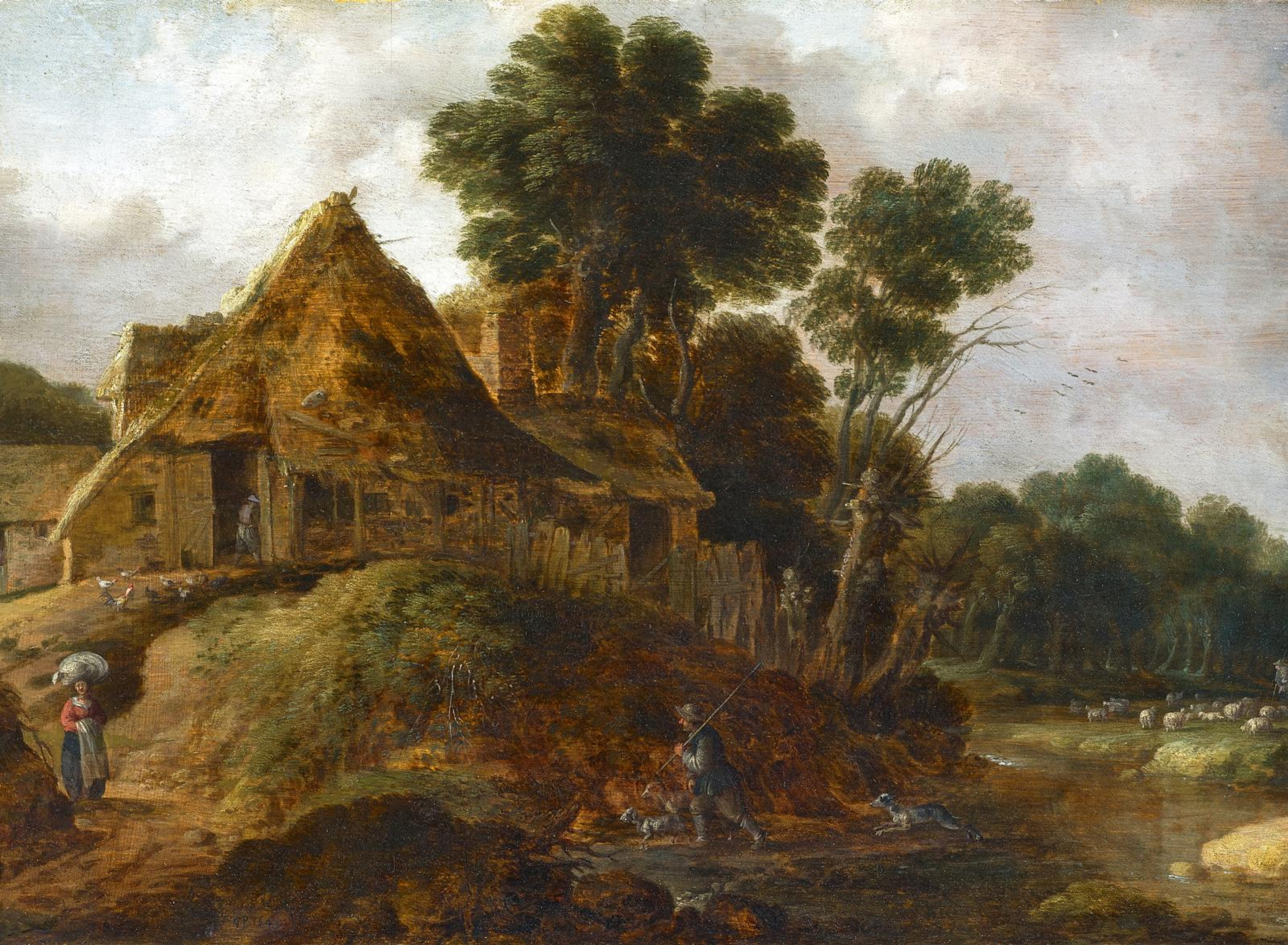
Wooded landscape with a hermit and travellers

In 1634 Gillis became together with his brother Bonaventura a master in the Antwerp Guild of Saint Luke. Initially the two brothers shared a studio in Antwerp until in 1641 Bonaventura moved to Hoboken (Antwerp) where he worked in a studio with his siblings and pupils Catharina and Jan Peeters.

It is believed that Gillis travelled to Brazil, possibly on two occasions. The first time would have been in 1636 when he travelled probably in the company of Johan Maurits van Nassau-Siegen who had been appointed the governor of the Dutch possessions in Brazil. He arrived in Brazil in 1637 but only stayed until the next year. He possible returned to Brazil in 1640. During his stay in Brazil he produced four paintings of views of Brazil and numerous drawings that were subsequently used by himself and his brother Bonaventura in paintings of Brazilian scenes.

He was the father of Willem, Gillis the Younger and Bonaventura the Younger. Bonaventura the Younger was a sailor and marine artist. There are also landscapes known by Gillis the Younger.

He died in Antwerp.

== Work ==
Although Gillis Peeters, like most of the members of his artist family, is best known as a marine artist, landscapes account for the major portion of his output.

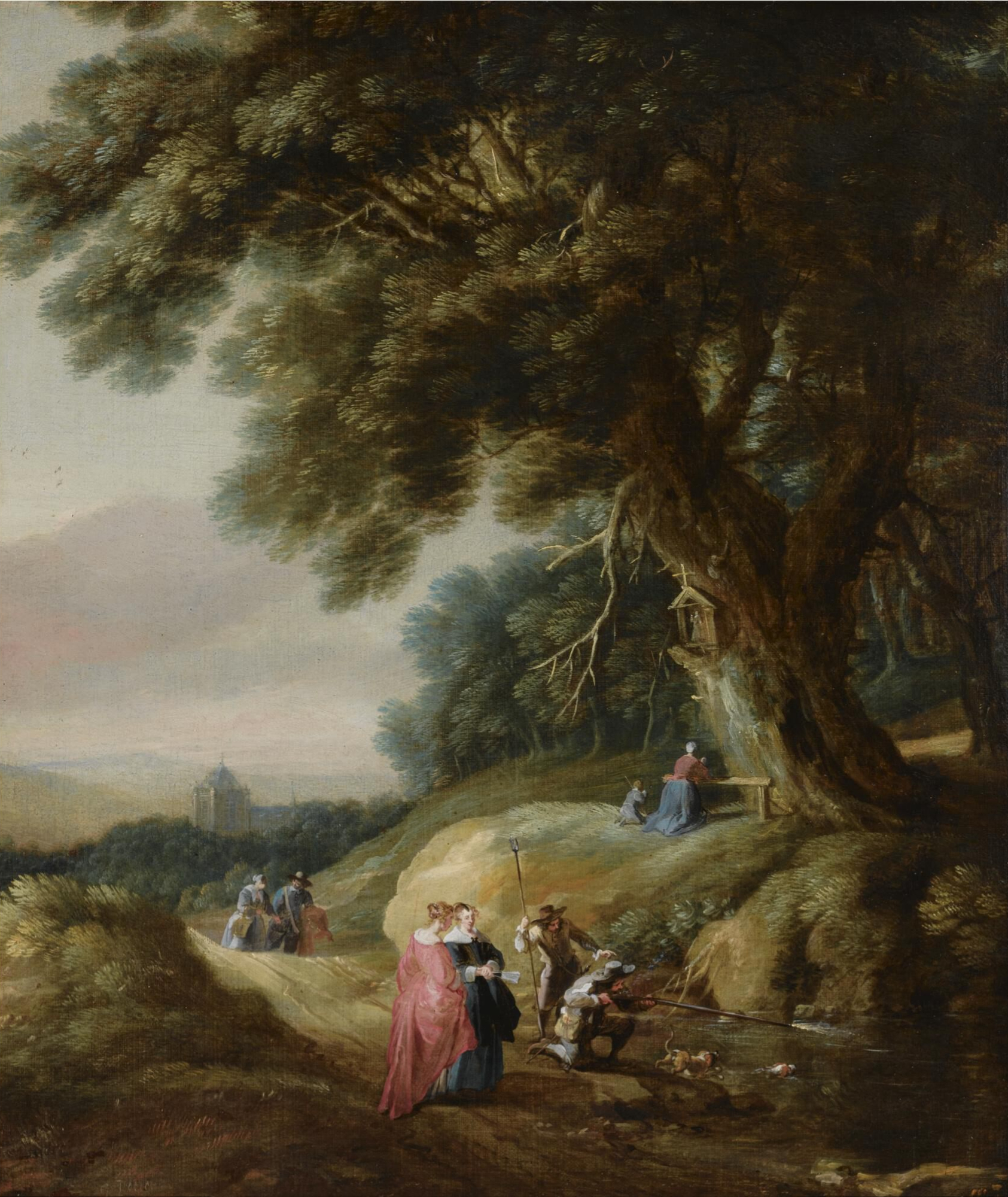
Wooded landscape with elegant travellers and huntsman on a path

One of the earliest recorded work is the Landscape with Watermill (Rijksmuseum) dated 1633. In its blue-green hues it resembles the work of his contemporary Flemish landscape artists such as Lucas van Uden. His earlier landscapes representing mountains with spruce of the 1630s are characterised by their tonal palette and small figures. These early works seem to be closer to the travel landscapes of the Flemish painter Paul Bril, which depict imaginary experiences in a southern landscape, than to the Baroque of Peter Paul Rubens with its clear colours and bright light. In the 1640s his horizons become deeper and his colours richer. A Wooded rocky landscape with a couple tending sheep (Christie's, 14 November 2007 in Amsterdam, lot 191) of 1652 (but possibly 1632) is a typical example of his small-scale working style. Unlike contemporary Dutch landscapes, which strived for realism, the landscapes of Peeters are artificial and contrived and are intended as a form of poetry rather than a realistic document. With their candy-like colours, picturesque buildings and feathery trees they seem to anticipate the Rococo idyllic visions of a François Boucher hundred years later. Some of his landscapes such as those he made in Brazil (for example View of Pernambuco de Recife) are more topographical in nature.

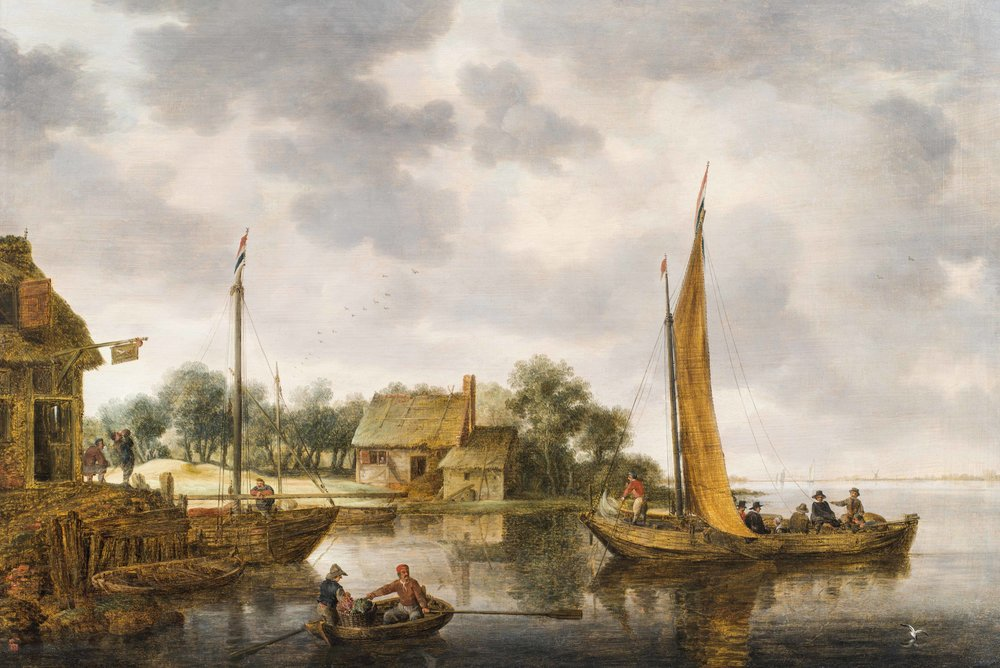
River landscape with a ferryboat

His marine paintings cover the range of stormy seas, battle scenes, river scenes and harbour scenes and are similar to the early work of his brother in their muted tones and atmospheric effect.

Gillis collaborated with other family members and artists in Antwerp. For instance, he collaborated with his brother Bonaventura on a painting of the Battle of Kallo and other marine scenes. There is also a collaboration with David Teniers the Younger on A Scene in a Flemish Village for which Teniers painted the figures and Peeters the landscape.

Gillis was trained as an etcher and made various engravings of hunting scenes after designs by Frans Snyders and a series of rural scenes and landscapes for the Antwerp publisher Joannes Meyssens.
