= Salamander (TV series) =

- Genre: Crime drama
- Created by: Bavo Dhooge
- Written by: Ward Hulselmans
- Directed by: Frank van Mechelen
- Starring: Filip Peeters; Violet Braeckman; Tine Reymer; Koen Van Impe; Wim Opbrouck; Emilie Van Nieuwenhuyze; Leah Thys
- Composer: Steve Willaert
- Country of origin: Belgium
- Original languages: Flemish; French
- No. of series: 2
- No. of episodes: 22

Production
- Producers: Corinne Appelmans; Jan Theys; Eric Wirix
- Cinematography: Lou Berghmans
- Editor: Pieter Smet
- Running time: 50 minutes
- Production company: Skyline Entertainment

Original release
- Network: Eén
- Release: 30 December 2012 – 11 March 2018

Salamander is a Belgian crime drama television series, created by and based upon the novel by Bavo Dhooge, that was first broadcast on Eén on 30 December 2012. The 12-part series, produced by Skyline Entertainment and written by Ward Hulselmans, stars Filip Peeters as Inspector Paul Gerardi, a Belgian detective who investigates the theft of 66 safety deposit boxes belonging to prominent Belgian figures. Following the success of the first series, a second series was commissioned by Eén but production did not begin until five years later. The second series is subtitled Blood Diamonds and was first broadcast on 7 January 2018.

== Plot ==
=== Series 1 ===
Jonkhere, a small private bank in Brussels, is robbed and 66 safe deposit boxes belonging to a number of the most prominent public figures in Belgium are cleaned out. The owners want to keep the thefts under wraps, presumably to avoid scandal. Police Inspector Paul Gerardi (Filip Peeters) carries out the investigation. He discovers the connection; that the victims are members of a secret organisation called Salamander. This is a cabal of the country's industrial, financial, judicial and political elite; the safe-deposit boxes contained secrets as far back as World War II. Gerardi becomes the target of both the criminals and the authorities.

=== Series 2 ===
Chief Inspector Gerardi opens an investigation after political refugee Léon Tchité is murdered. He becomes entangled in a blood diamonds network.

== Production ==
Filming began in Brussels in May 2011. Filming locations include Brussels Park, Egmont Park, the exterior of the Belgian Federal Parliament, Cinquantenaire, Law Courts of Brussels, Brussels-South railway station and Hotel Metropole. Funding was provided by Vlaamse Radio- en Televisieomroeporganisatie and the Belgian Tax Shelter.

BBC Four acquired Salamander in 2013 and first broadcast commenced from 8 February 2014. Sue Deeks, head of acquisition for the BBC said, "'Salamander' is a gripping, edge-of-the seat thriller. It will make a fantastic addition to our Saturday nights on BBC4". The series was also acquired by RTBF and later by Netflix. The first series was later released on DVD in the United Kingdom via Arrow Films on 17 March 2014.

Salamander was set for an English-language remake, as an international co-production between Cite Amerique and the British Artist Studio, but later, production switched to ABC Studios, where a pilot for a potential 2017-2018 series was ordered on 31 January 2017.

== Cast ==
=== Main cast ===
- Filip Peeters as Inspector Paul Gerardi
- Violet Braeckman as Sofie Gerardi
- Tine Reymer as Patricia Wolfs
- Koen Van Impe as Vic Adams
- Wim Opbrouck as Marc De Coutere
- Emilie Van Nieuwenhuyze as Nicola Wolfs
- Leah Thys as Martine Callier

=== Supporting cast ===
==== Series 1 (2012—2013) ====
- Koen De Bouw as Joachim Klaus
- Mike Verdrengh as Raymond Jonkhere
- Lucas Van den Eynde as Carl Cassimon
- Jo De Meyere as Armand Persigal
- Warre Borgmans as Commissaris Martin Colla
- Vic De Wachter as Gil Wolfs
- Kevin Janssens as Vincent Noël
- Tom De Hoog as Patrick Dejonghe
- An Miller as Sarah Debruycker
- Els Olaerts as Yolande
- Jan Van den Bosch as Vic's Assistant
- Bart Hollanders as Victor

==== Series 2: Blood Diamonds (2018) ====
- Vera Van Dooren as Commissaris Monda
- Jeroen Van der Ven as Antony Minnebach
- Boris Van Severen as Jamie Capelle
- Michael Vergauwen as Jokke De Moor
- Peter Van De Velde as René Kroneborg
- Govert Deploige as Alain
- Tom Van Bauwel as Roger Roppe
- Herbert Flack as Jonatan Bury
- Kadèr Gürbüz as Sabine Kroneborg

== Episodes ==
=== Series 1 (2012—2013) ===
No.	Title	Directed by	Written by	British air date	UK viewers (million)
1	"Episode 1"	Frank van Mechelen	Ward Hulselmans	8 February 2014	1.34
In complete secrecy, a professional gang has broken into the private bank Jonkhere in Brussels. Of the 800 safe-deposit boxes at the bank, they targeted only the 66 linked to some of the most prominent figures in Belgium—individuals who, in turn, are all connected to "Salamander," a clandestine organization that wields immense power within the country. Bank director Jonkhere and the judicial authorities attempt to hush up the heist, but they are unable to prevent Brussels police inspector Paul Gerardi from being tipped off about the break-in by an informant.
2	"Episode 2"	Frank van Mechelen	Ward Hulselmans	8 February 2014	1.25
Gerardi’s informant is found dead. Gerardi is placed on leave by his superiors, but it soon becomes clear that he is being watched. Managing to slip out of his house, Gerardi begins an investigation into the Jonkhere bank. When the deputy director finds the pressure becoming too much to bear, he commits suicide; Gerardi, now a suspect in the murder, sees no other option but to go into hiding with a former colleague at a monastery.
3	"Episode 3"	Frank van Mechelen	Ward Hulselmans	15 February 2014	1.16
Gerardi’s wife and daughter are constantly being harassed by unit P9, which has been tasked with tracking Gerardi down. Gerardi uncovers a lead that points to Senator Rasenberg—a member of Salamander and one of the safe-deposit box owners.
4	"Episode 4"	Frank van Mechelen	Ward Hulselmans	15 February 2014	1.10
The owners of the broken-into safes receive envelopes containing copies of sensitive information that the burglars stole from the safes. The high-ranking officials are given a choice: resign or commit suicide. Gerardi is captured by Unit P9, and Prosecutor General Persigal offers him a choice: cooperate with them, or disappear for good.
5	"Episode 5"	Frank van Mechelen	Ward Hulselmans	22 February 2014	1.10
Acting on instructions from the prosecutor general, Gerardi pursues the individuals who broke into the Jonkhere bank—an operation conducted in the utmost secrecy—but the entire situation puts his marriage at risk.
6	"Episode 6"	Frank van Mechelen	Ward Hulselmans	22 February 2014	1.10
Gerardi must seduce Senator Rasenberg’s wife in the hope of uncovering more information about Salamander. Meanwhile, Wolfs—the mastermind behind the heist—continues his mission to destroy Salamander. Gerardi’s investigation has become a thorn in Salamander’s side as the inspector draws ever closer to them, leading them to issue an order to eliminate him. Gerardi survives the attack, but his wife dies before his eyes.
7	"Episode 7"	Frank van Mechelen	Ward Hulselmans	1 March 2014	1.16
Following the death of his wife, Gerardi places his daughter in a boarding school, where she will be safe until he manages to track down those responsible for his wife’s murder. He soon realizes that Senator Rasenberg’s wife betrayed him, and he succeeds in preventing the senator’s appointment as a government minister. The police have discovered the body of a young woman. Gerardi follows the trail to a vacant apartment, which had been rented by one of the individuals who broke into the Jonkhere bank.
8	"Episode 8"	Frank van Mechelen	Ward Hulselmans	1 March 2014	1.11
Wolfs has another batch of envelopes delivered to the members of Salamander, and a new wave of dismissals and suicides sweeps across the country. At the boarding school where his own daughter is staying, Girardi encounters Wolfs’s daughter—who also happens to be mother of a student at the same school.
9	"Episode 9"	Frank van Mechelen	Ward Hulselmans	8 March 2014	1.17
Salamander and the Royal House set out to find a scapegoat for the state the country is in, and they settle on Prosecutor General Persigal. Gerardi discovers that Salamander has a connection to the Second World War, but the organization is closing in on him, and he only just manages to escape another attempt on his life.
10	"Episode 10"	Frank van Mechelen	Ward Hulselmans	8 March 2014	1.13
Before his dismissal, Persigal manages to pass on a great deal of crucial information to Gerardi, including details about the connection between 'Salamander' and the Second World War. Gerardi’s daughter has become friends with Wolfs’ granddaughter, and she invites Gerardi to her father’s estate—where, unbeknownst to him, Gerardi finds himself face-to-face with the person who ordered the break-in at Jonkhere.
11	"Episode 11"	Frank van Mechelen	Ward Hulselmans	15 March 2014	1.20
Persigal is found dead in bed, alongside his secretary. Gerardi learns more about the past of millionaire Wolfs. However, Wolfs does not trust Gerardi and has him investigated by Klaus, who discovers that Gerardi is a police officer looking into the heist at Jonkhere’s, and not the insurance agent he claimed to be.
12	"Episode 12"	Frank van Mechelen	Ward Hulselmans	15 March 2014	1.17
Eventually, Paul discovers Wolfs’s secret: a resistance mission during the Second World War in which Emile Jonkhere betrayed Harry Dewulf. A meeting of "Salamander" is organized, and it turns out that Jonkhere is its leader. The illustrious Vincent Nöel is also brought to the fore. The meeting is raided, and the reign of Salamander comes to an end. In the end, Wolfs kills Jonkhere out of revenge, as everything the Jonkhere family has built was founded on the blood of his father. Paul and his daughter, Sofie, are finally able to breathe a little easier.

Reception

Ben Lawrence of The Daily Telegraph gave the first two episodes three stars out of five and called its plot "compelling".

=== Series 2: Blood Diamonds (2018) ===
No.	Title	Directed by	Written by	British air date	UK viewers (million)
1	"Episode 1"	Frank Van Mechelen	Ward Hulselmans	14 April 2018	N/A
Five years ago, Marc Jopart—the husband of Patricia Wolfs—was used by General Bombé to smuggle blood diamonds out of Kitangi. Just before his final trip, he was coerced by two of Bombé’s opponents into smuggling a USB drive containing evidence of war crimes committed by the general to Brussels. In the present day, Léon Tchité, a political adversary of Bombé, is murdered in the Matonge district of Brussels. Chief Inspector Gerardi suspects that 'Salamander' is involved in the killing and begins an investigation.
2	"Episode 2"	Frank Van Mechelen	Ward Hulselmans	14 April 2018	N/A
The murder of Tchité is causing unrest at the highest political level in Brussels. Prime Minister De Coutere wants Gerardi removed from the investigation. Gerardi seeks advice from his friend and lawyer, René Kroneborg, regarding Jopart. Kroneborg assures him that 'Salamander' no longer exists, but later, Gerardi discovers a tracking device under his car. He tells his colleague Danny everything. Together, they set out to find Jacky Lanciers, a high-end sex worker who frequently had Tchité as a client. Banker Antony Minnebach and Martine Callier attempt to get their hands on the evidence against Bombé.
3	"Episode 3"	Frank Van Mechelen	Ward Hulselmans	21 April 2018	N/A
During a pursuit of the burglars who broke into Jacky’s apartment, Gerardi causes an accident in which Danny is seriously injured. As a result, Gerardi is suspended from duty. He arranges a meeting with Jacky, through whom he obtains incriminating evidence against Bombé. Jacky’s neighbor informs him that the burglars are hunting for Jacky, as they are looking for a photograph of Bombé. Gerardi tracks them to Minnebach’s villa. Acting on behalf of foreign banks, Minnebach is attempting to bring Bombé to power in order to profit from the diamond mines. Meanwhile, Sofie is being followed by people working for Martine—a tactic intended to pressure Gerardi into calling off his pursuit.
4	"Episode 4"	Frank Van Mechelen	Ward Hulselmans	21 April 2018	N/A
Jamie Cappelle, a member of Salamander, is released from prison. He is recruited by Martine to seduce Nicola and gain entry to her home, where incriminating material against Bombé is believed to be kept. Gerardi tasks Jokke with gathering information on Jopart and Minnebach. Jokke alerts Monda, who then takes over the investigation. At Tchité’s funeral, the P9 pursue Gerardi in an attempt to seize the photograph. Through a ruse, Gerardi manages to have the photo copied before being taken in for questioning. Bombé’s impending presidency is approved by Prime Minister De Coutere.
5	"Episode 5"	Frank Van Mechelen	Ward Hulselmans	28 April 2018	N/A
In Nicola’s room, Jamie finds a key to a bank safety deposit box and alerts Martine. Through René, Gerardi arranges for the diamond to be examined by a Jewish diamond dealer in Antwerp. The cutter claims the diamond originated in South Africa, but hands Gerardi a note with his phone number. It turns out the diamond did indeed come from Kitangi. Meanwhile, in Cannes, Jacky intends to sell her remaining diamonds to start a new life. The prospective buyers attempt to swindle her by offering a pittance, and then, through a ruse, manage to steal the diamonds, leaving Jacky with nothing.
6	"Episode 6"	Frank Van Mechelen	Ward Hulselmans	28 April 2018	N/A
The diamond that Gerardi had examined turns out to be cut glass. Danny dies in the hospital. Jacky returns to Belgium to the home of Prime Minister De Coutere, who proves to be her half-brother. Jamie manages to persuade Nicola to let him look inside her secret safe, which contains all of her father’s secrets. He steals a USB drive, which presumably holds video footage that could be used to discredit Bombé. Jacky wants to strike a deal with Minnebach, who sends Becca to confront her. Gerardi manages to overpower Becca just in time, after which she falls from a window to her death. Jacky is being questioned by Gerardi and Monda, but just as she is about to reveal something, her lawyer enters—none other than René Kroneborg.
7	"Episode 7"	Frank van Mechelen	Ward Hulselmans	5 May 2018	N/A
Jamie discovers the contents of the USB drive. He breaks up with Nicola, who assumes he is involved with Sofie and subsequently kicks her out of her room. Minnebach sends a hitman after Jamie, but Jamie manages to escape. He cuts off his 'Salamander' tattoo and leaves with Sofie—who, as it turns out, does indeed have feelings for him. Paul tries to reach Jackie, but learns that she has allegedly committed suicide—a claim Paul does not believe. René has been playing a double game, aided by his wife, Sabine. Gerardi picks up the trail of Jonatan Bury, a former minister who was forced to resign following a scandal. Racked with remorse, René intends to hand over further incriminating documents, but Sabine intervenes after a meeting with Martine and Minnebach. Jackie is found dead; while everything points to suicide, Gerardi remains unconvinced.
8	"Episode 8"	Frank Van Mechelen	Ward Hulselmans	5 May 2018	N/A
Sofie and Jamie spend blissful, romantic nights together on the northern coast of France. Meanwhile, Paul discovers that Jamie is working on behalf of Salamander. He mistakenly believes that his daughter has been kidnapped.
9	"Episode 9"	Frank Van Mechelen	Ward Hulselmans	12 May 2018	N/A
Jamie decides to come clean and reveal everything. His love for Sofie is genuine. He intends to hand over the film to Paul Gerardi. The P9 unit has intercepted their conversation and tipped off the Salamander associates about their meeting place. Just as Jamie approaches Gerardi, both men are shot by a Salamander sniper, and the USB drive containing the film is stolen. Adams arrives too late.
10	"Episode 10"	Frank Van Mechelen	Ward Hulselmans	12 May 2018	N/A
Adams takes Gerardi and Sofie to the clinic. Martine and her associates travel to Kitangi to finalize the deal regarding the diamond mines with General Bombé. Meanwhile, Adams and Gerardi discover a copy of the USB drive on Sofie’s laptop and inform the Prime Minister. He dismisses their concerns, however, pointing to the disastrous consequences that revealing the truth would have: a major financial blow to a retail bank—which serves 800,000 customers and relies on revenue from the Kitangi mines. Gerardi’s suspension is lifted by his superior, Monda. On the eve of a scheduled press conference where the Prime Minister intends to declare his support for Bombé, Gerardi visits him at home, presenting photographs of those who have died or been murdered as a result of "Salamander." Deeply disappointed, Gerardi subsequently submits his resignation. The following day, having had a change of heart, the Prime Minister issues a statement to the media: he calls for an investigation into all those involved in the bank’s mismanagement and the cover-up of criminal activities; he withdraws all support for General Bombé, denouncing his actions (including the incriminating video of a murder); and, finally, he offers his own resignation as Prime Minister. In the end, Paul and Sofie drive away together, after saying goodbye to Patricia and Nicola.
