= Bonaventura Peeters the Elder =

Flemish painter

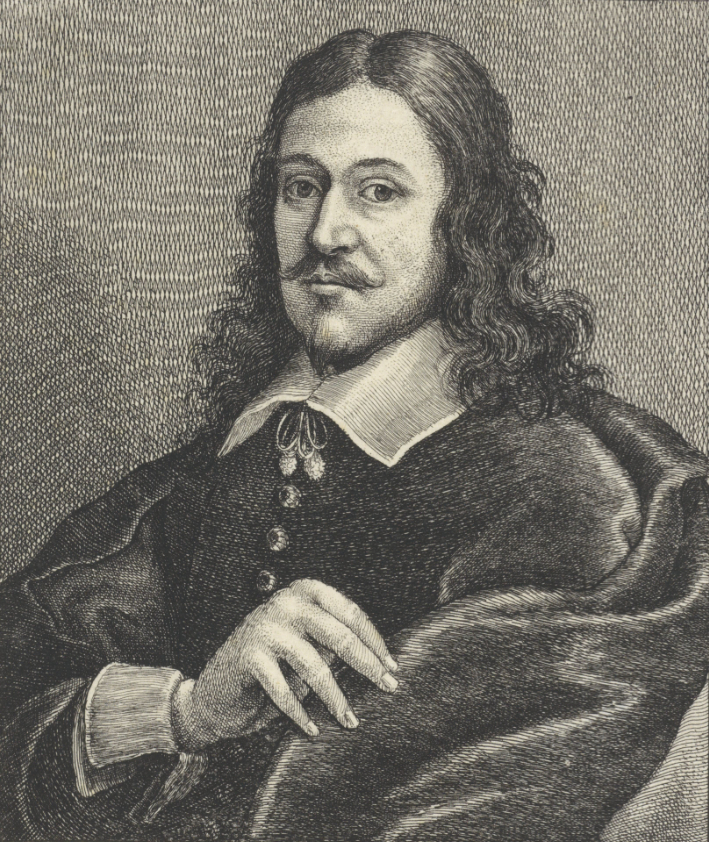
Portrait of Bonaventure Peeters by Wenceslas Hollar, 1649

Bonaventura Peeters (I) or Bonaventura Peeters the Elder (23 July 1614 – 25 July 1652) was a Flemish painter, draughtsman and etcher. He became one of the leading marine artists in the Low Countries in the first half of the 17th century with his depictions of marine battles, storms at sea, shipwrecks and views of ships in rivers and harbours.

== Life ==
Peeters was born in Antwerp as the son of Cornelis Peeters and Catharina van Eelen. He was baptised in the church of St. Walpurgis in Antwerp on 23 July 1614. He was a brother of the seascape painters Jan the Elder, Gillis the Elder and Catharina Peeters.

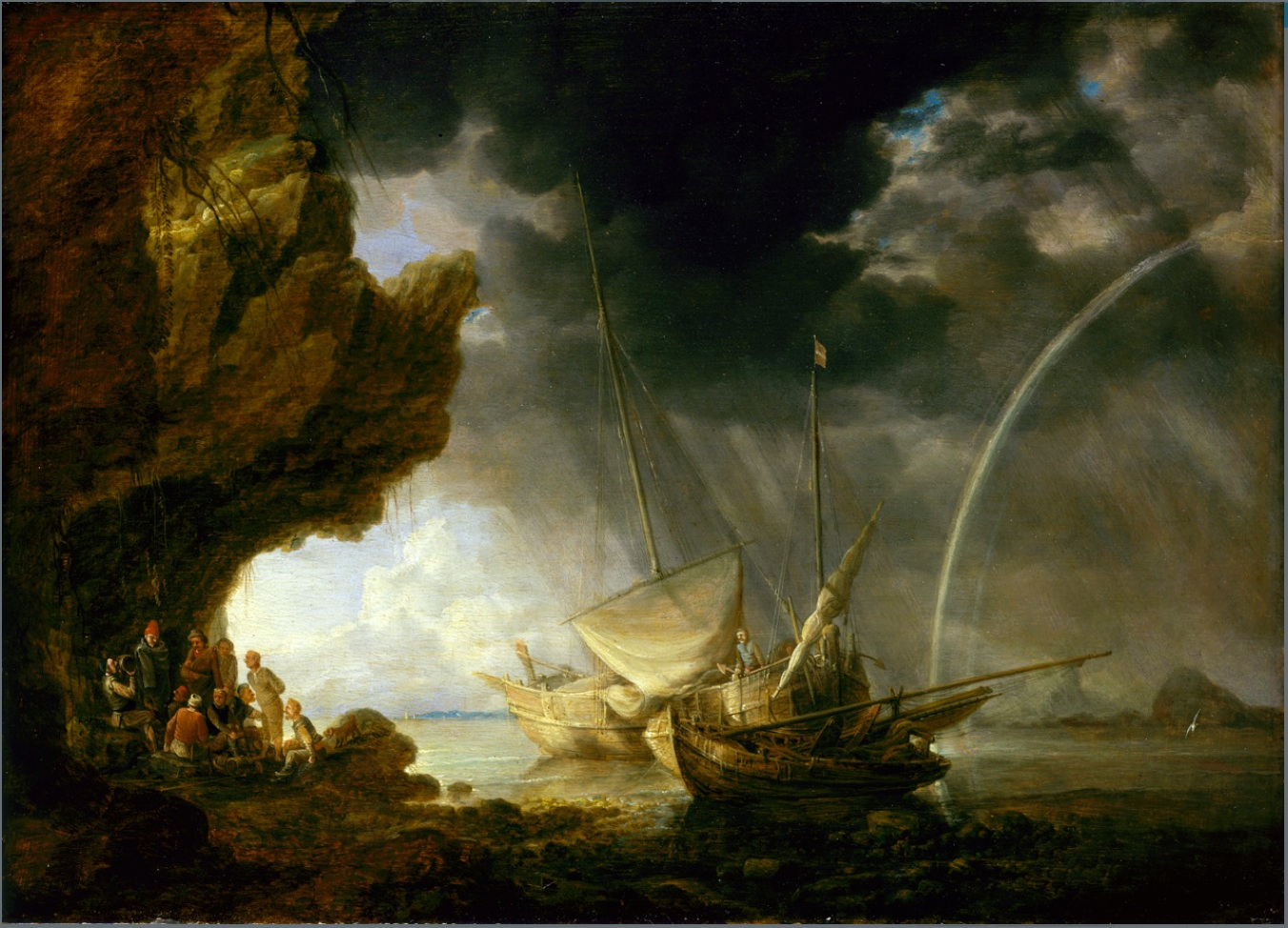
Seascape with Sailors Sheltering from a Rainstorm

Nothing is known about his early training although it is possible that Andries van Eertvelt, a specialist of stormy sea paintings, was his master. Bonaventura became a master in Antwerp's Guild of Saint Luke in 1634. On 5 July 1638 he received a commission of the pensionary of Antwerp to produce maps of the Siege of Kallo and Verrebroek which had occurred only one month earlier. He was able to deliver the maps half a month later. This earned him a subsequent commission from the pensionary for a large painting of the Siege of Kallo, which he completed in collaboration with his brother Gillis. He became one of the few marine specialists active in the Southern Netherlands during the mid-17th century.

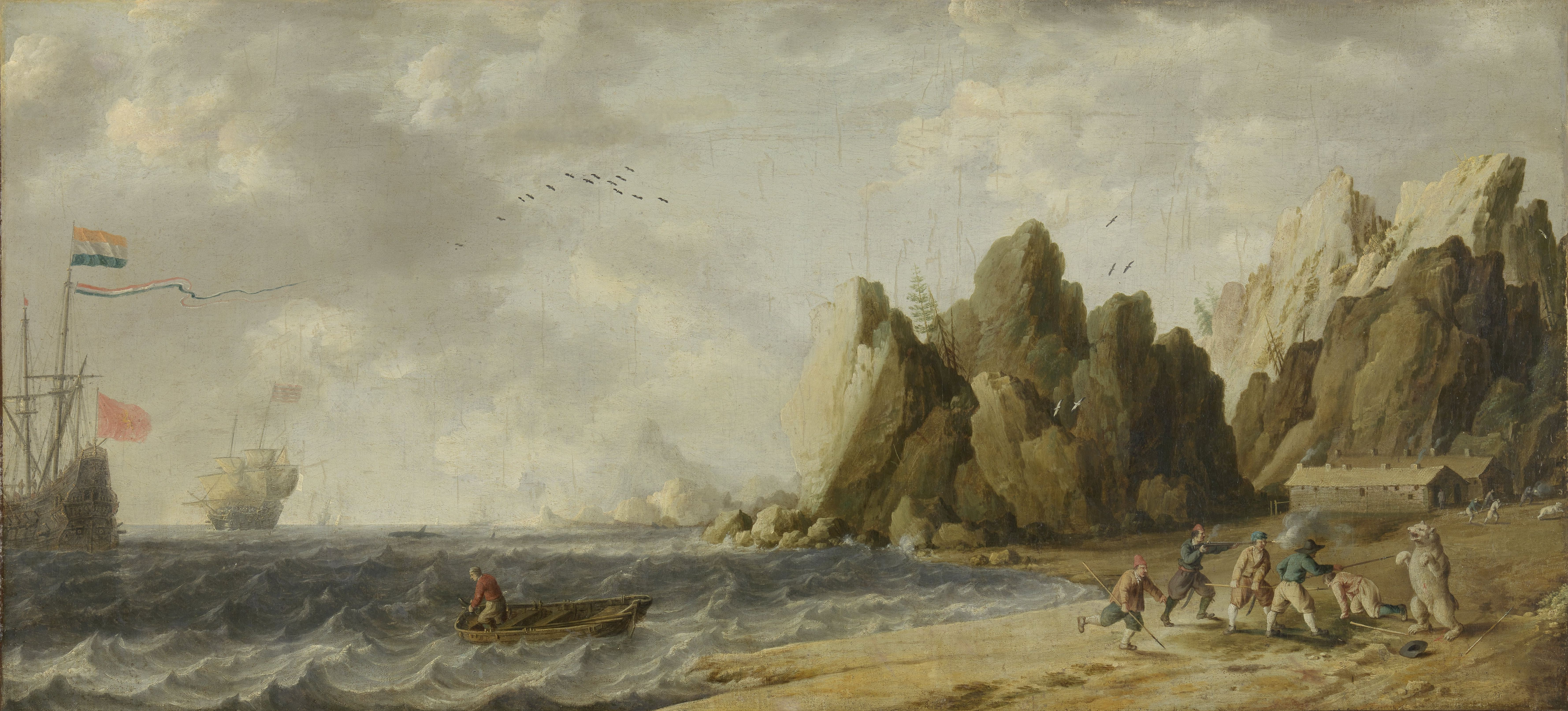
Polar Bear Hunt on the Coast of Norway

Initially he shared a studio in Antwerp with his older brother Gillis. However, he moved in 1641 to Hoboken (Antwerp) where he lived in a spacious residence and worked in a studio with his pupils Catharina and Jan Peeters (I). He was the teacher of his siblings Catharina and Jan Peeters (I). The son of his brother Gillis, referred to as Bonaventura Peeters the Younger (1648–1702) became a marine and landscape artist.

Peeters never married and died in Hoboken, aged 38 after suffering from ill health the last years of his life.

== Work ==
Bonaventura's marine paintings comprise the whole range of battle scenes, storms, shipwrecks, views of ships in rivers, coastal waters and harbours, night scenes etc. His earliest marine paintings are panoramic views. His intimate and accurate knowledge of ships may hint at an early life spent at sea. He paid particular attention to the detailed depiction of clouds and waves.

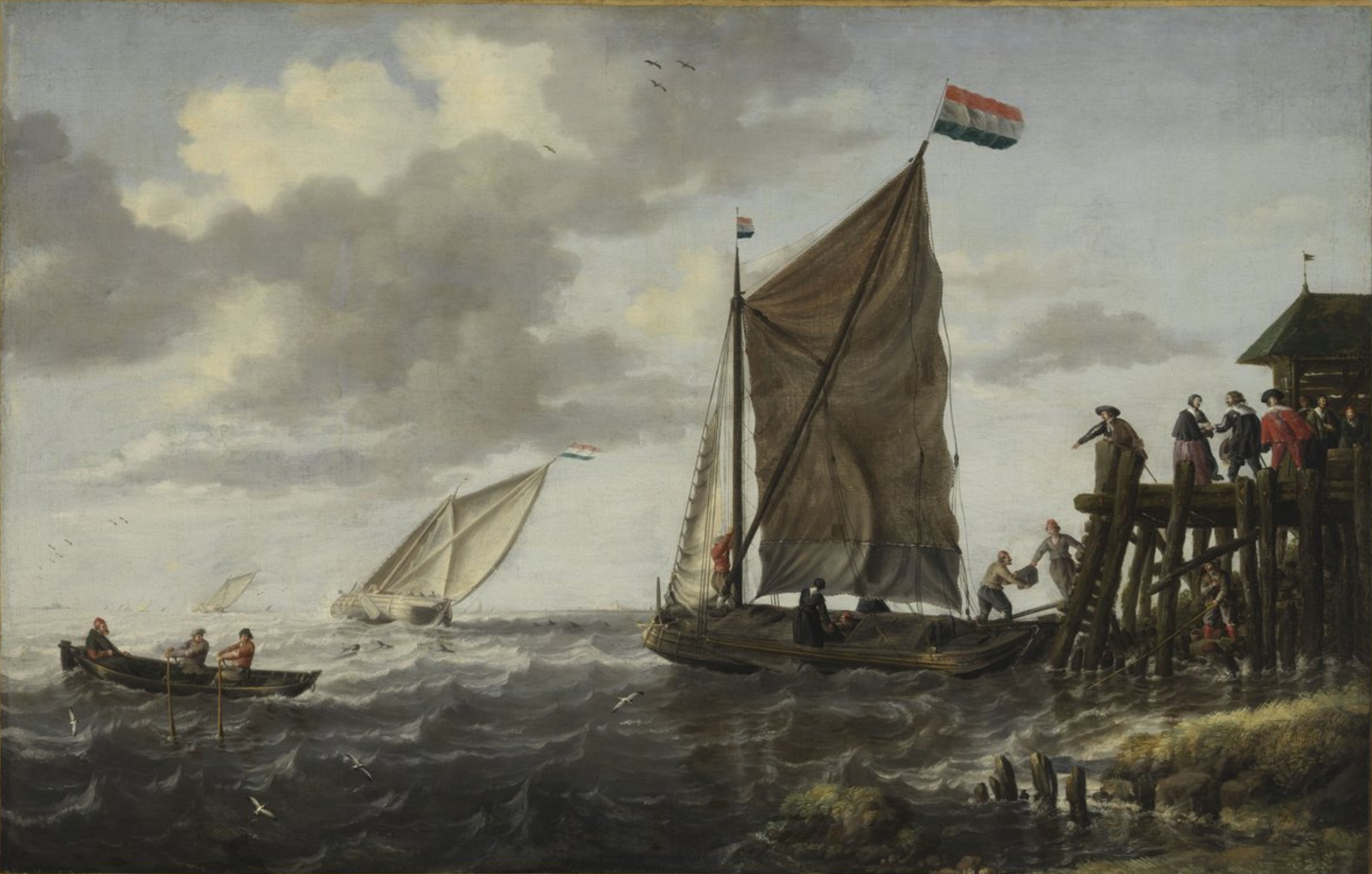
Arrival of the Boat

His earlier works show a similarity to the tonal phase of Dutch landscape painting. Later paintings reflect the stronger colours of Italianate classicism. This shift follows the general change in artistic style at the time. Dramatic shipwrecks with dark billowy clouds form a significant part of his oeuvre, as do serene ports and "portraits" of ships.

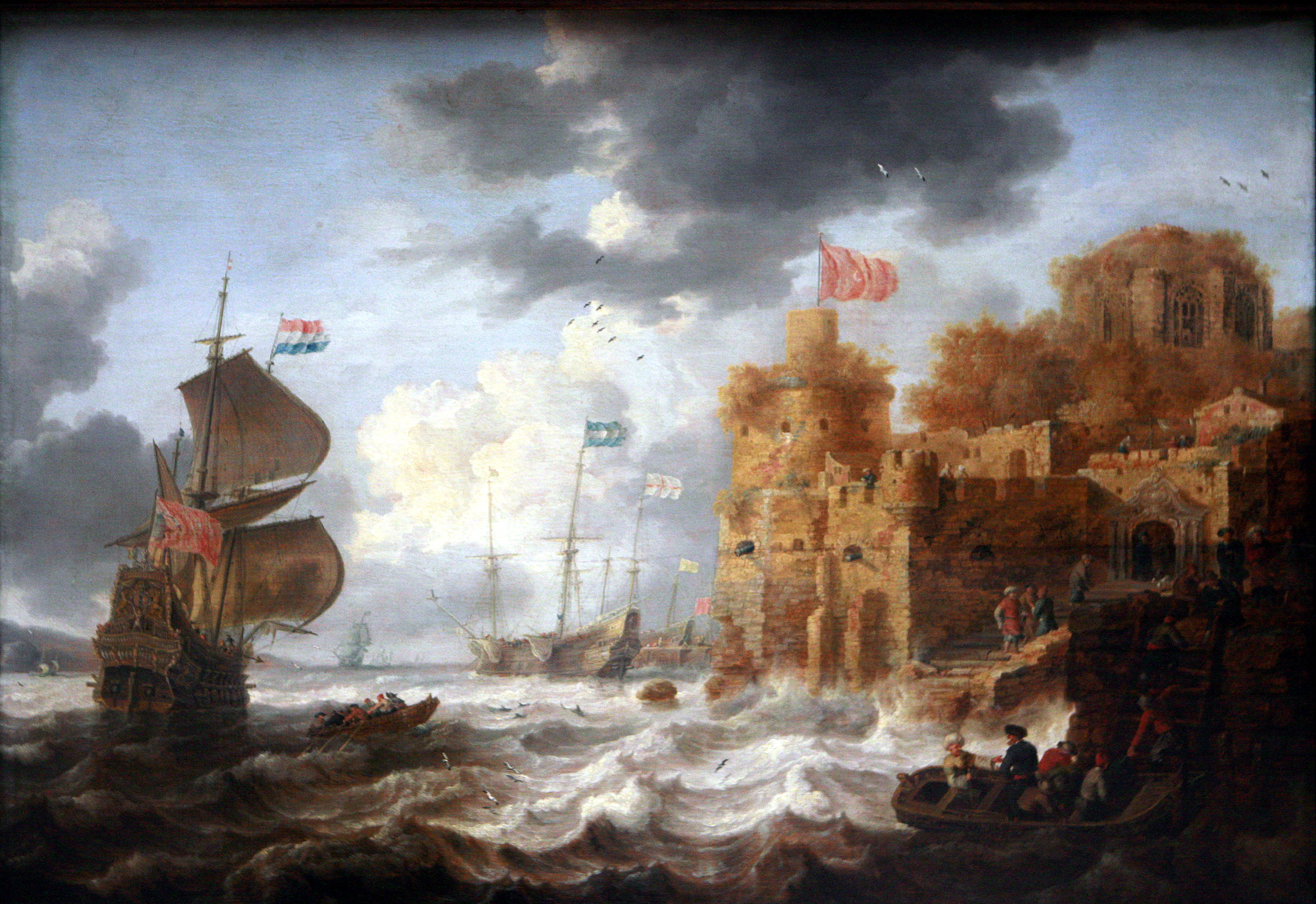
Port in the Orient

Many of Peeters' paintings depict actual locations along the North Sea and the river Scheldt and these subjects form the bulk of his artistic production. He may have even travelled along the coast of Scandinavia as is shown by his views of the port of Archangel in Northern Russia one of which offers a scene of reindeers or elks pulling sledges. His other views of Scandinavian ports and scenes support the view that he may have travelled there. Bonaventura Peeters the Elder repeatedly returned to the portrayal of seaports with shipping in the foreground. Peeters the Elder developed something of a speciality in the portrayal of seaports with shipping in the foreground. His first such view dates to 1634, the year in which he became a master in the Antwerp guild. It depicts The 'Hercules' and 'Eenhorn' off the port of Hoorn (1634, National Maritime Museum, London). Peeters' oeuvre includes a number of smaller examples of this type, including three views of Willemstad, taken from different angles, and a view of Brouwershaven, in Rotterdam.

His many views of far-away Mediterranean and Middle Eastern ports reflect a growing taste for the exotic and are probably completely imaginary or derived from prints, including those by his younger brother Jan who had travelled in Southern Europe. This tradition developed simultaneously in Flemish Baroque painting and in Dutch Golden Age painting, with many artists, including Peeters, working in both Antwerp and in the Dutch Republic. For his views of Brazil Bonaventura may have relied on descriptions or depictions by his brother Gillis, who had travelled to South America.

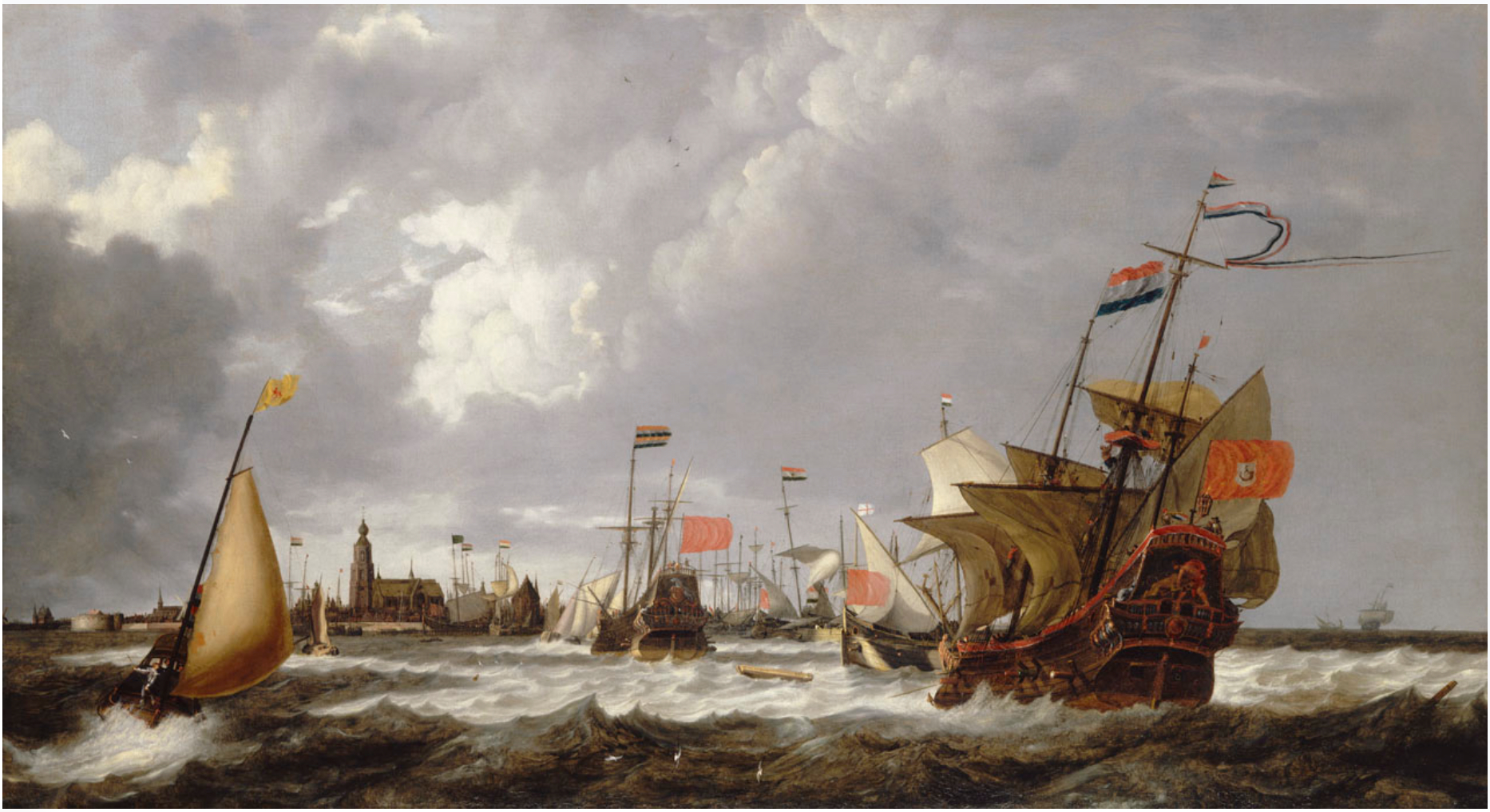
The 'Hercules' and 'Eenhorn' off the port of Hoorn

Bonaventura Peeters is known also for his drawings and engravings with maritime subjects. One of them entitled Ships in a storm (Plantin-Moretus Museum in Antwerp) has a poem by him on its back in which he compares the dangers at sea with the dangers that man has to face over a lifetime. His drawings, as well as those of his family members Jan Peeters I and Bonaventura Peeters II, were used in the preparation of the Blaeu's Atlas Maior of the whole world (Atlas Blaeu-Van der Hem).

Bonaventura collaborated with other family members and artists in Antwerp. For instance, he collaborated with his brother Gillis on a painting of the Battle of Kallo. As he was a gifted staffage painter he was asked by other painters to paint the figures in their compositions. His collaboration with father and son Pieter Neeffs the Elder and the Younger, painters of church interiors, is documented in the signed examples in the National Gallery in London and the Kunsthistorisches Museum in Vienna.
