= Filip Peeters =

Belgian actor (born 1962)

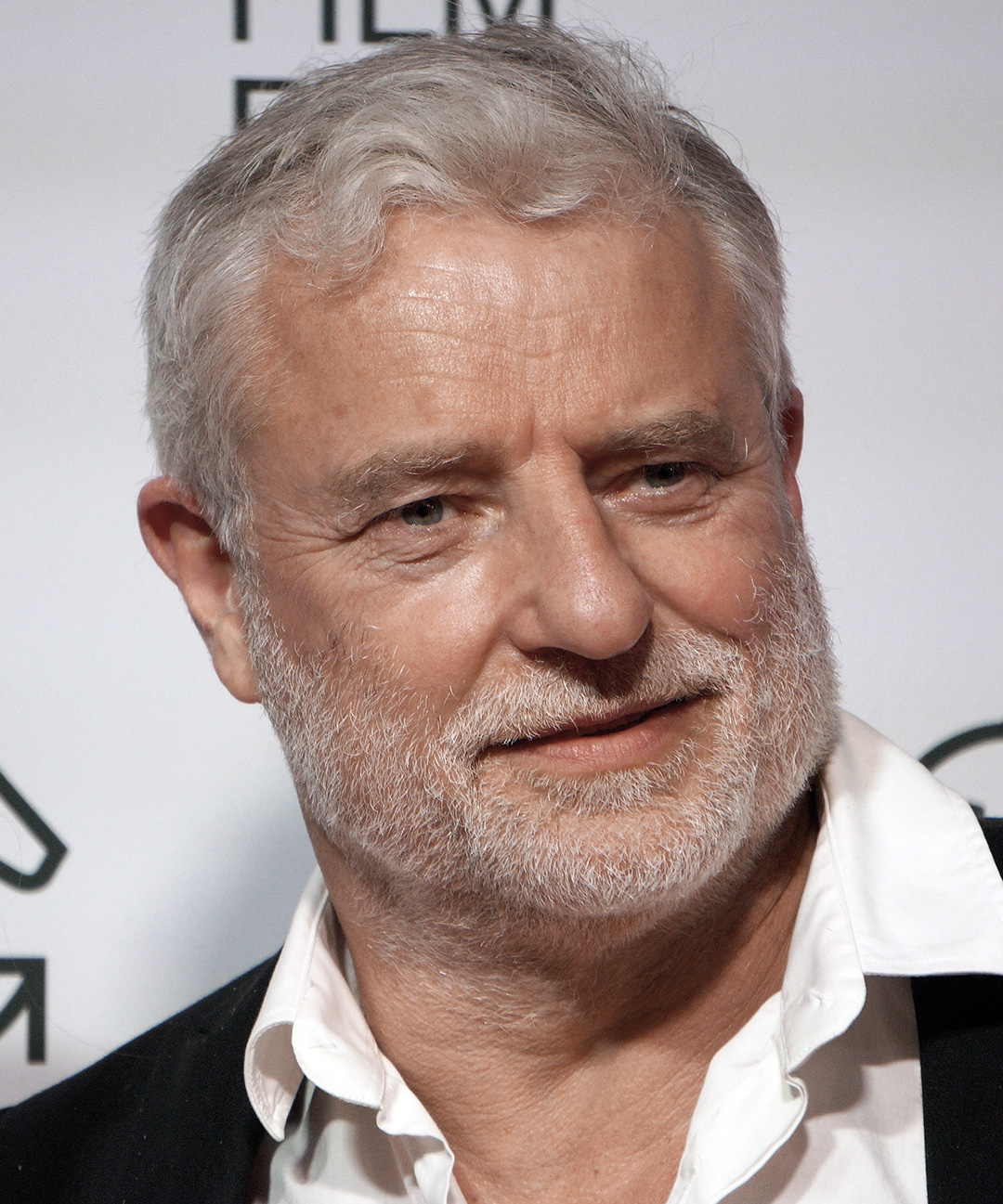
- Peeters in 2020
- Born: 2 December 1962 (age 63); Anderlecht, Belgium
- Occupations: Actor, politician
- Spouse: An Miller

Filip Peeters or Philip Peeters (born 2 December 1962) is a Flemish actor. He is well known for his work in the television series Salamander as Paul Gerardi and Zone Stad as Didier Francks. He is one of a few Flemish actors who have been credited internationally.

He initially trained as a chef, however he found a talent in acting and attended the Studio Herman Teirlinck drama school. Since leaving the institute, he has starred in numerous Dutch, Belgian and German television programmes.

== Filmography ==
- Unit 13 (1997) - rijkswachter
- Recht op Recht (1998-2002) - Hugo Van Eyck
- Iedereen Beroemd! (2000)
- Team Spirit (film)|Team Spirit (2000)
- De Stilte van het Naderen (2000)
- Baby (2002)
- Resistance (2003)
- Briefgeheim (film) (2010) - Kolonel Brandsema
- Team Spirit 2 (2003)
- Buitenspel (film) (2005)
- De Hel van Tanger (2006)
- Vermist (film) (2007)
- Loft (film) (2008)
- Soeur Sourire (2009) - Antoine Brusson
- Dossier K (2009) - Hoofdcommissaris De Keyser
- De Texas Rakkers (2009) - stem Jerom
- Penoza (2010) - Christian Schiller
- Brasserie Romantiek (2012) - Paul
- Salamander (2012-2013, 2018) - Paul Gerardi
- Zone Stad (2013) - Didier
- Smoorverliefd (2013) - Theo
- The White Knights (2015) - Lieutenant Reykart
- Michiel de Ruyter (2015)
- The Missing (Series 2) (2016) - Kristian Herz

== Personal life ==
Peeters studied at the Herman Teirlinck institute. He lives in Boechout with his wife, Flemish actress An Miller, and has two children.

== Awards ==
- Best Actor Flemish Entertainment Award - 2009
- Best Actor Award at the Montréal World Film Festival - 2006
- Shooting Stars Award at the Berlinale - 2001
