= Gaspar Bouttats =

Flemish printmaker and engraver

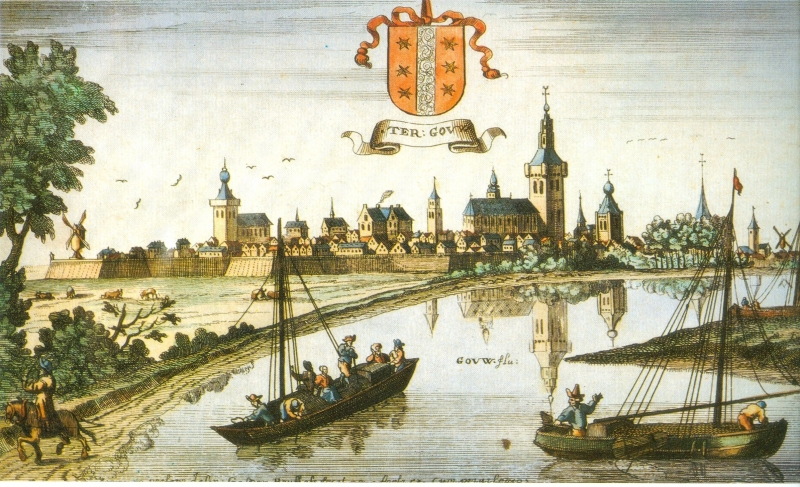
View of Gouda, after a drawing by Jan Peeters

Gaspar Bouttats the Elder or Gaspard Bouttats the Elder (c. 1640 – 1695–96) was a Flemish printmaker and engraver of the Baroque period.

== Life ==
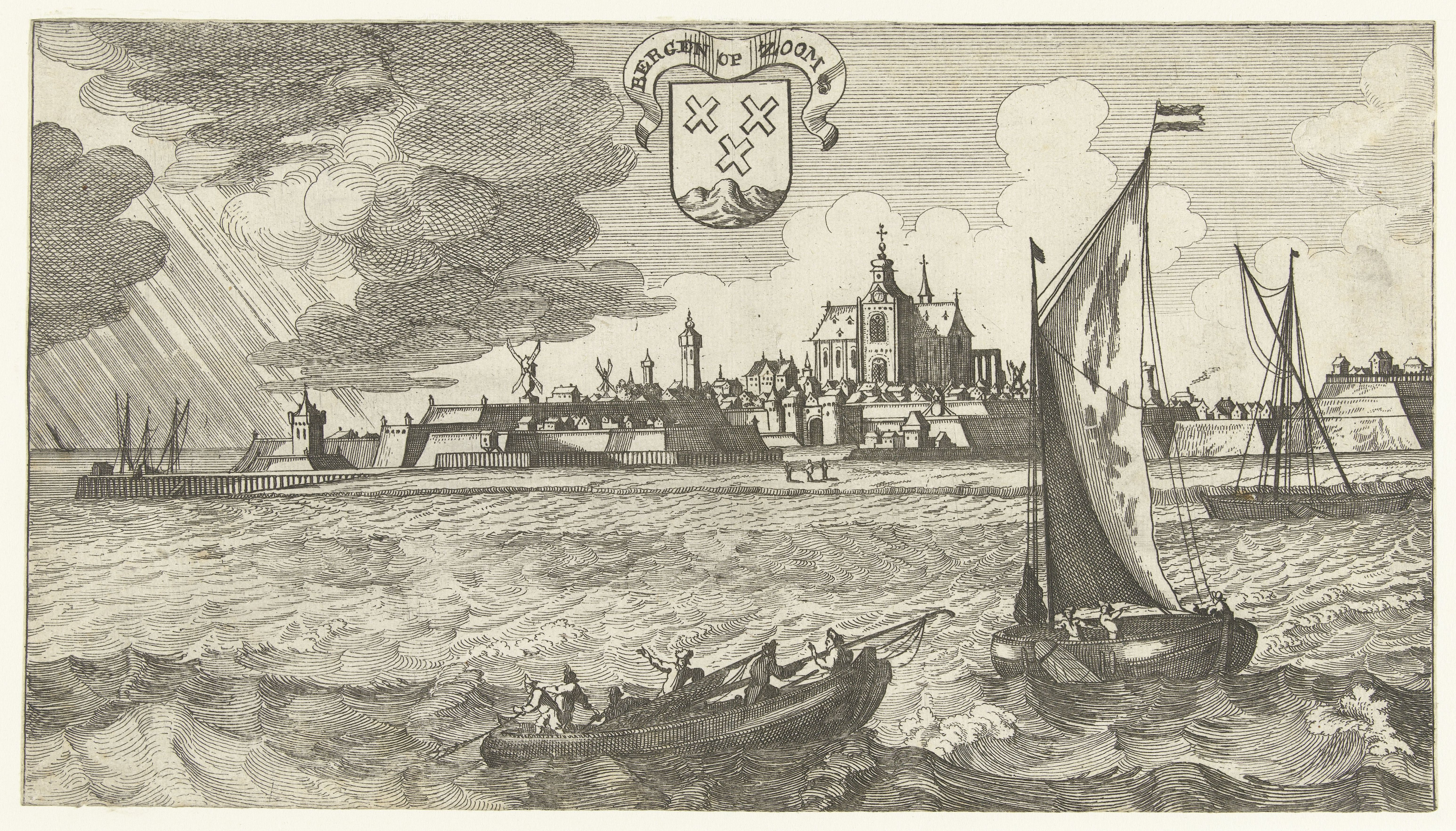
View of Bergen op Zoom, after a drawing by Jan Peeters

He was born in Antwerp in a family of engravers. He was the son of the engraver Frederick Bouttats the Elder and Marie de Weert. His uncle Philibert Bouttats as well as his younger brother Frederik Bouttats the Younger built reputations as engravers.

He was trained by his father. He was registered in 1668–69 with the Antwerp Guild of Saint Luke as a wijnmeester (wine master) which was a title reserved for the children of the members of the Guild and thus indicates that his father was also a member of the Guild at that time. He was dean of the Guild in 1690–1691.

Bouttats was the teacher of his son Pieter Balthazar Bouttats and of Jan Antoon de Pooter, Geeraet van Caseel (1668–69), Michiel van Hove (1672–73), Jan Francis Clouwet (1672–73); Carolus Bouttats (1690–91) and Gaspar de Man (1694–95).

He died in Antwerp in 1695 or 1696.

== Work ==
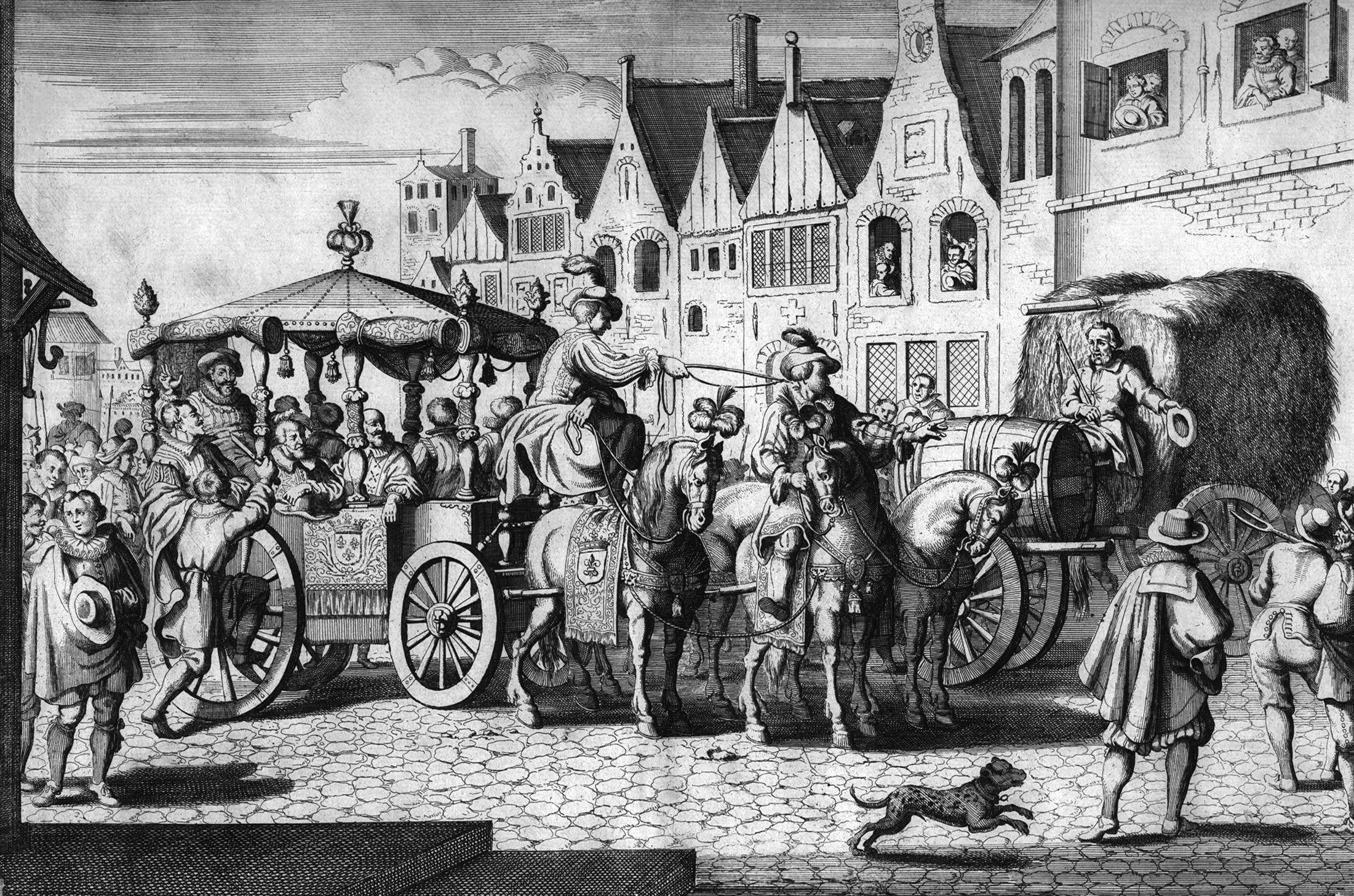
The Assassination of Henry IV, King of France

He engraved chiefly for the booksellers, and also made some plates after different masters. They are principally etched, and some finished with the burin. The following works are by him:

- Frontispiece for the Psalms of St. Augustine; Gaspar Boutats fec.
- The Massacre of St. Bartholomew.
- The Assassination of Henry IV.
- The Decollation of Count Nadasti, Count Corini, and Marquis Francipani.
- A Sutler's Tent; after Philips Wouwerman.

He often worked after designs by the marine and topographical artist Jan Peeters I. He etched the plates for a folio volume of city views of Jerusalem and the surrounding areas entitled 'Views of Jerusalem, and the surrounding Country;' after the designs Jan Peeters. In 1674 he engraved the Thooneel der Steden ende Sterckten van t'Vereenight Nederlandt met d'aengrensende Plaetsen soo in Brabandt Vlaenderen als anden Rhijn en elders verovert door de Waepenen der Groot-moghende Heeren Staeten onder het gheley vande seer Edele Hooghghebore Princen va Oranien (Scene of the Cities and the Forts of the United Netherlands with the Neighboring Places like Brabant, Flanders and on the Rhine and Conquered Elsewhere through the Weapons of the Great and Mighty Sovereign States under the Leadership of the Very Noble Prince of Orange). This last work offered city views of the major cities and forts in the Dutch Republic, the Southern Netherlands and along the Rhine after drawings by Jan Peeters.
