= Bonaventura Peeters the Younger =

Flemish painter

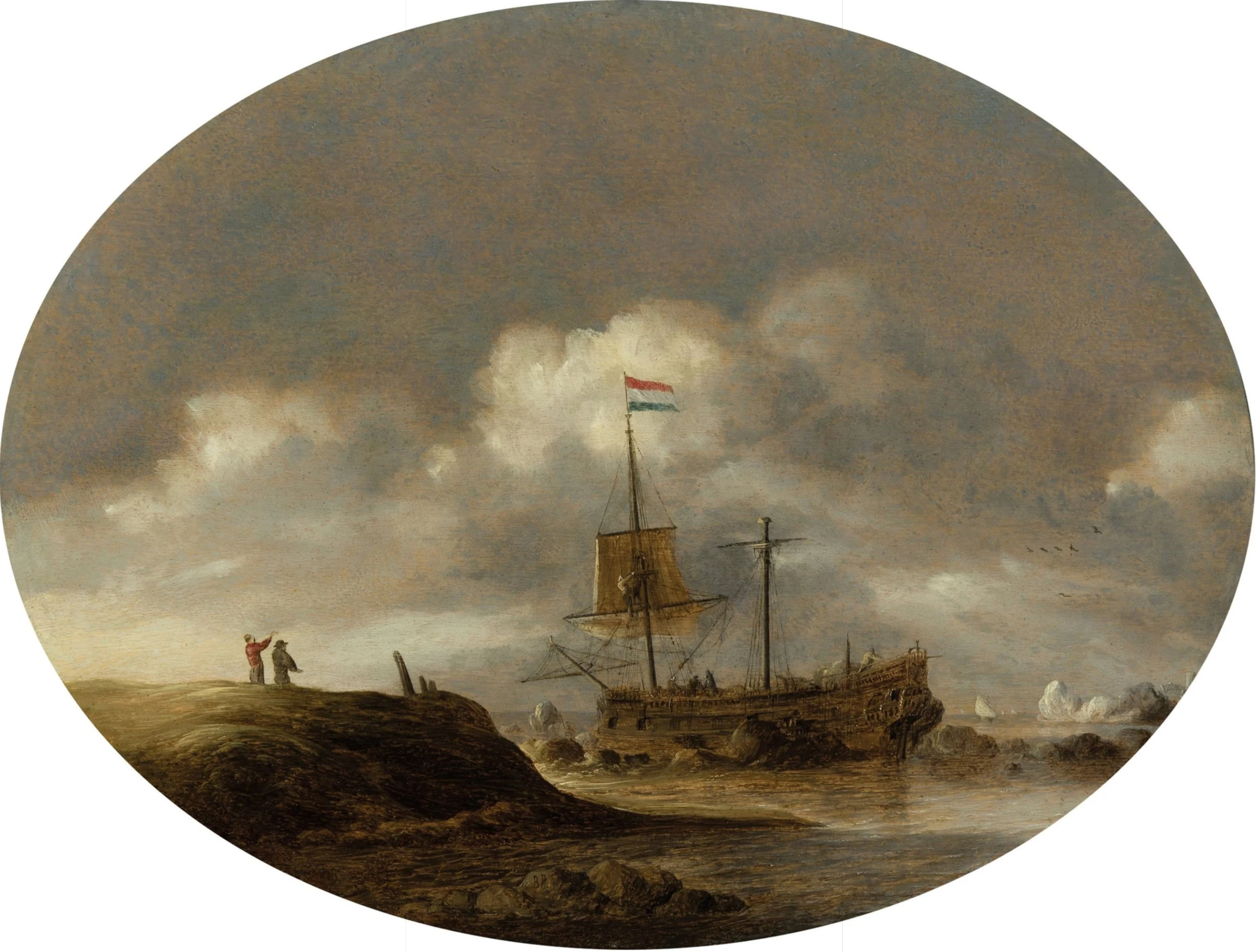
Damaged boat in front of a rocky coast

Bonaventura Peeters the Younger (Antwerp, 17 October 1648 – Antwerp, 2 September 1702), was a Flemish painter, drawing artist and sailor known for his marine and landscape paintings. He was a member of the Peeters family of artists which was active in Antwerp in the 17th century.

== Life ==
Peeters was born in Antwerp as the son of Gillis Peeters and Elisabeth de Smidt. Peeters was a scion of a family of painters specialised mainly in marine and landscape art. Peeters father and his uncle Bonaventura Peeters the Elder were marine painters and his brothers Willem (Guilliam, 1645–?) and Gillis (Egidius) the Younger (1645–1678) were also marine artists. Because of a relationship with a woman, Gillis later moved to Batavia, Dutch East Indies (current Jakarta in Indonesia), where he lived under the name Norbertus van Nimmen and later died.

There is a record of a Bonaventure Peeters registering as a pupil of the genre painter Hendrick Govaerts at the Antwerp Guild of Saint Luke in the Guild year 1700–1701. This was likely his son, referred to as Bonaventura Peeters III, whom he had with his wife Petronella Specx. Peeters most likely trained in the family workshop.

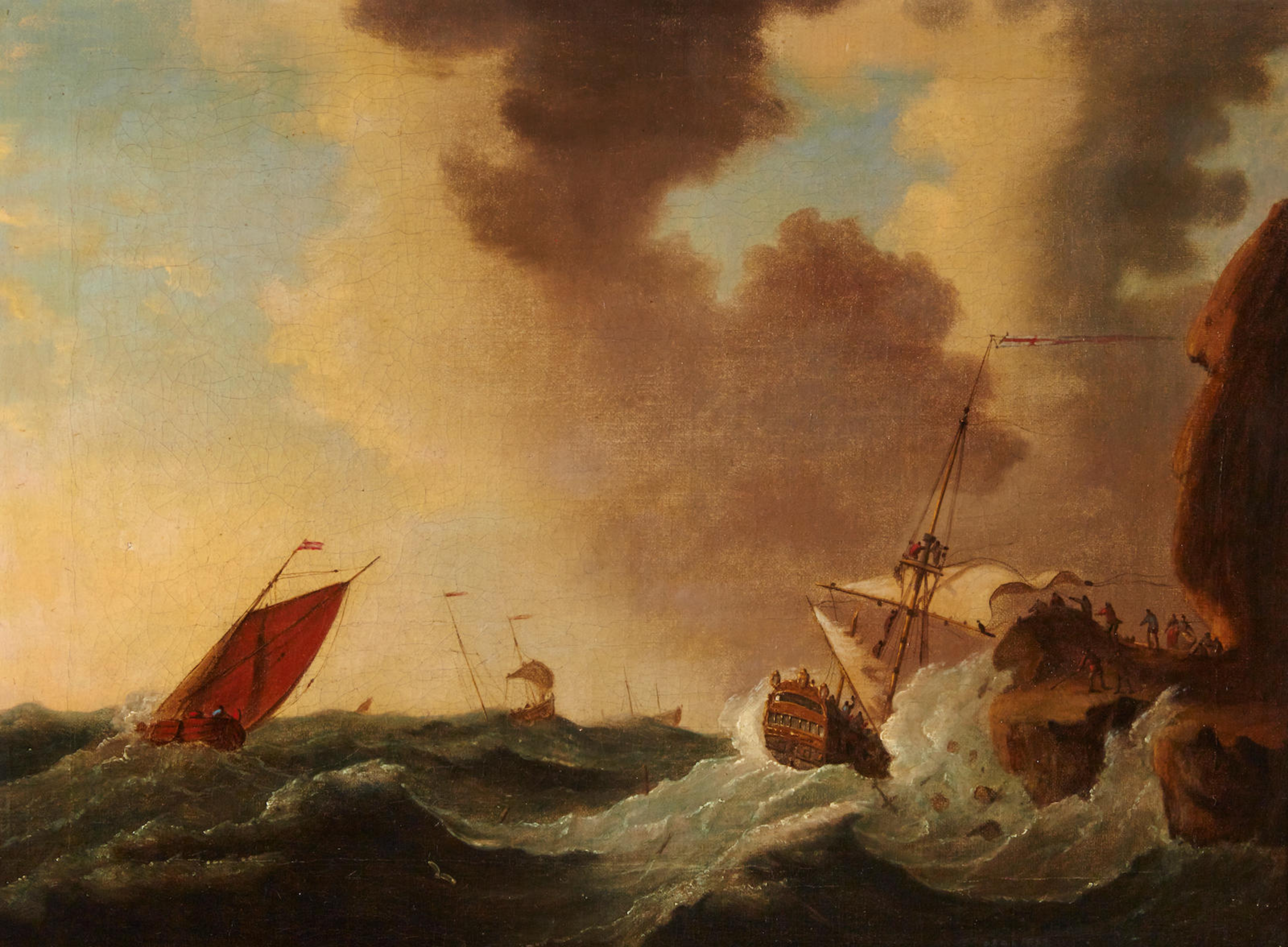
Running up on the windward shore

A notarial act dated 8 October 1681 references a voyage by Bonaventura on the Dutch ship 'De Leeuw', which was part of the fleet sailing to Messina. Peeters died in Antwerp where he was interred on 2 September 1702.

== Work ==
Bonaventura the Younger is mainly known as a marine artist, although he also painted landscapes. Very few of his works have been identified. His works are mainly marines with ships at sea or in harbours.

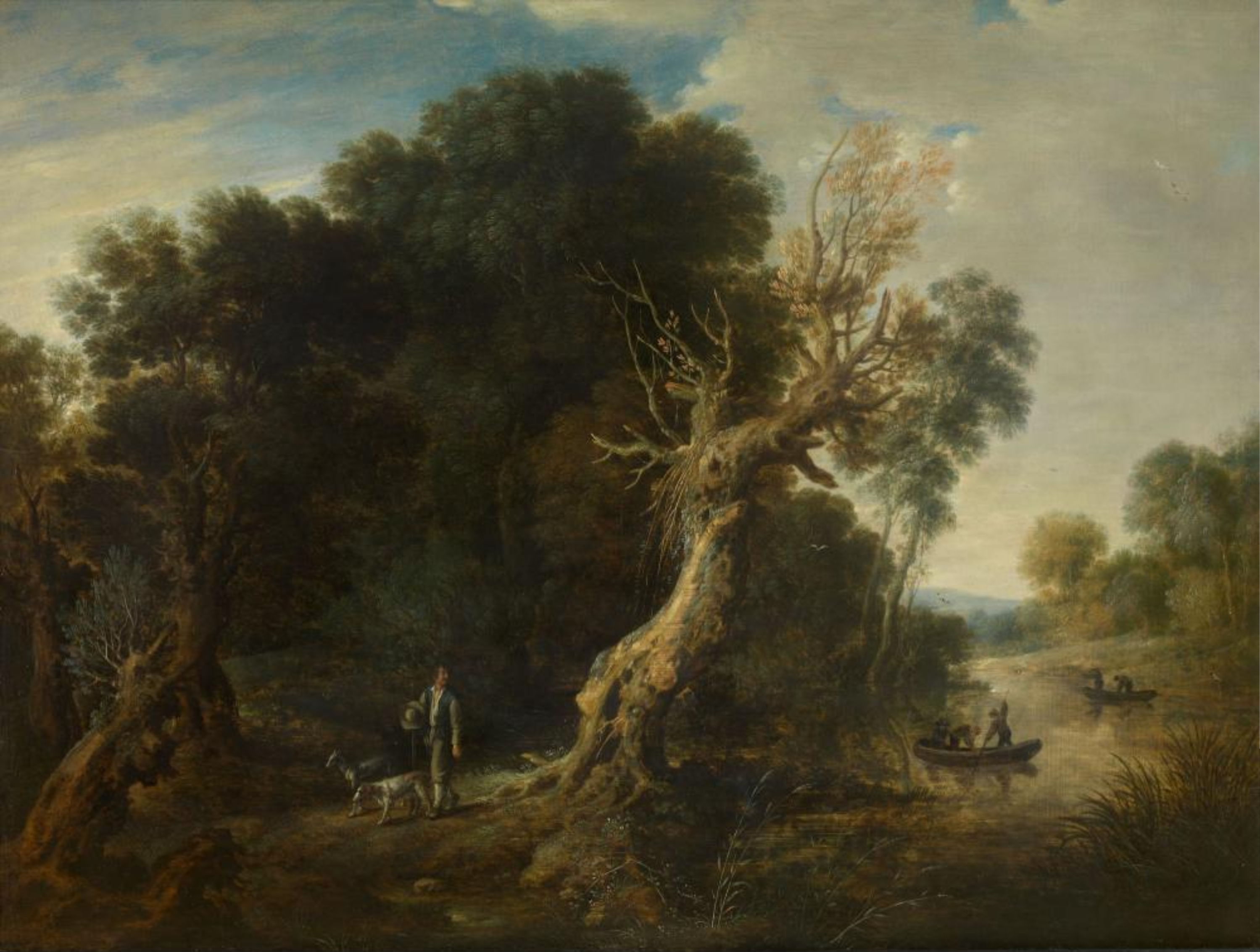
Forest view

His only known landscape painting is a Forest view painted in 1689 (Royal Museum of Fine Arts Antwerp). It depicts a wooded area in the foreground in which a man is walking his dogs while in the background it shows a river with two boats from which fishermen are casting their nets. The work is reminiscent of some of the works of the Sonian forest painters, a name given to the painters active in Brussels in the 17th century who often depicted the forests around Brussels.

A series of topographical drawings has been attributed to different members of the Peeters family, some of which also to Bonavantura the Younger and his father Gillis. There is a series of 6 drawings of southern ports in the collections of the Pushkin Museum and the Hermitage Museum, which are attributed to either Bonaventura or his father. This includes the View of a southern harbour (Pushkin Museum).
