= Jan Peeters I =

Flemish painter (1624–1677)

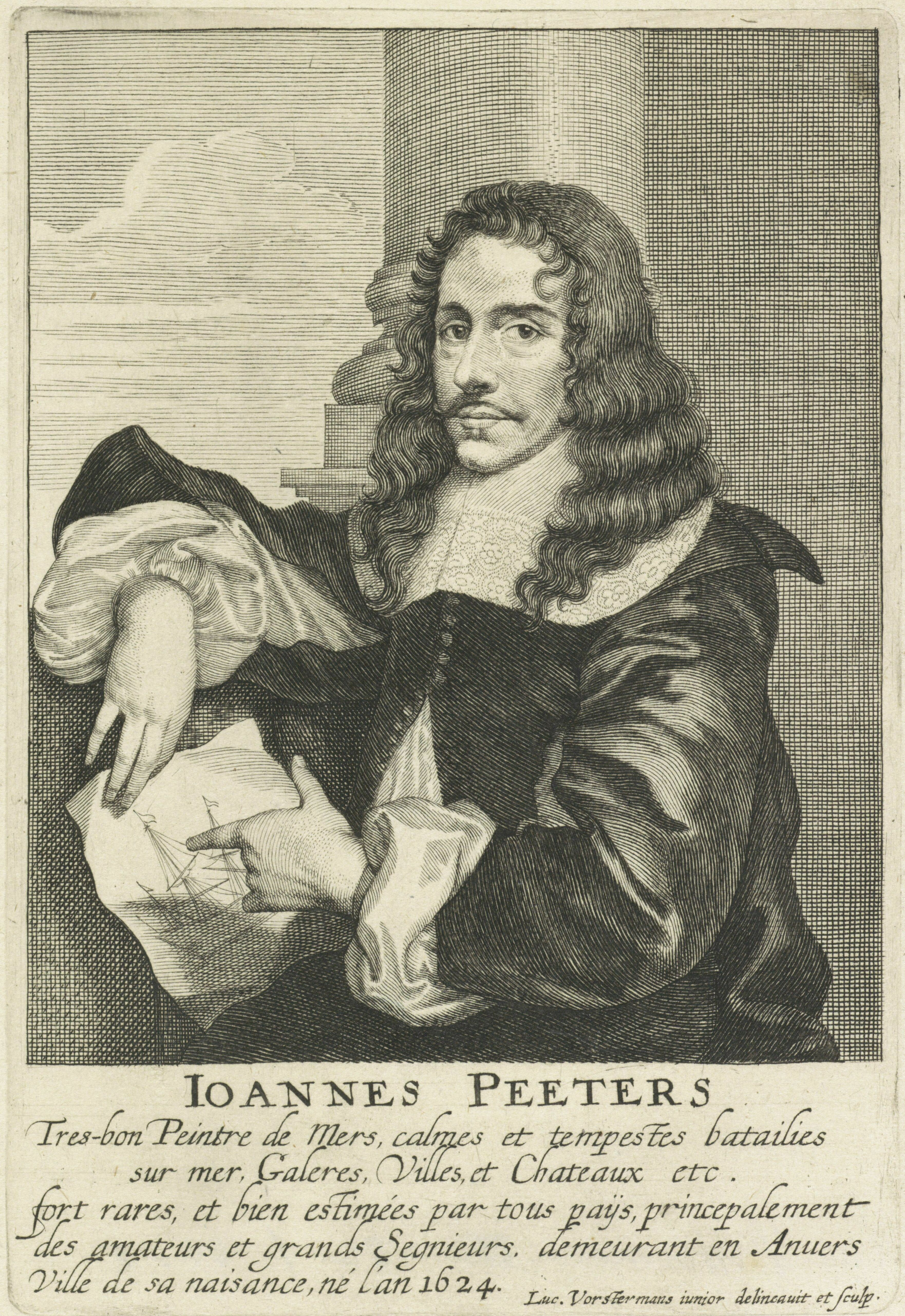
Portrait of Jan Peeters, 1662

Jan Peeters the Elder or Johannes Peeters (24 April 1624 – 1677) was a Flemish Baroque painter and draughtsman. He is known for his seascapes often depicting stormy seas and shipwrecks as well as for his topographical drawings, many of which were engraved by contemporary printmakers and published by the Antwerp printers.

== Life ==
Peeters was born in Antwerp as the son of Cornelis Peeters and Catharina van Eelen. He was the brother of the painters Gillis, Bonaventura I and Catharina. He studied with his brothers Bonaventura and Gillis as well as Joannes Boots. He became a master of Antwerp's Guild of St. Luke in 1645.

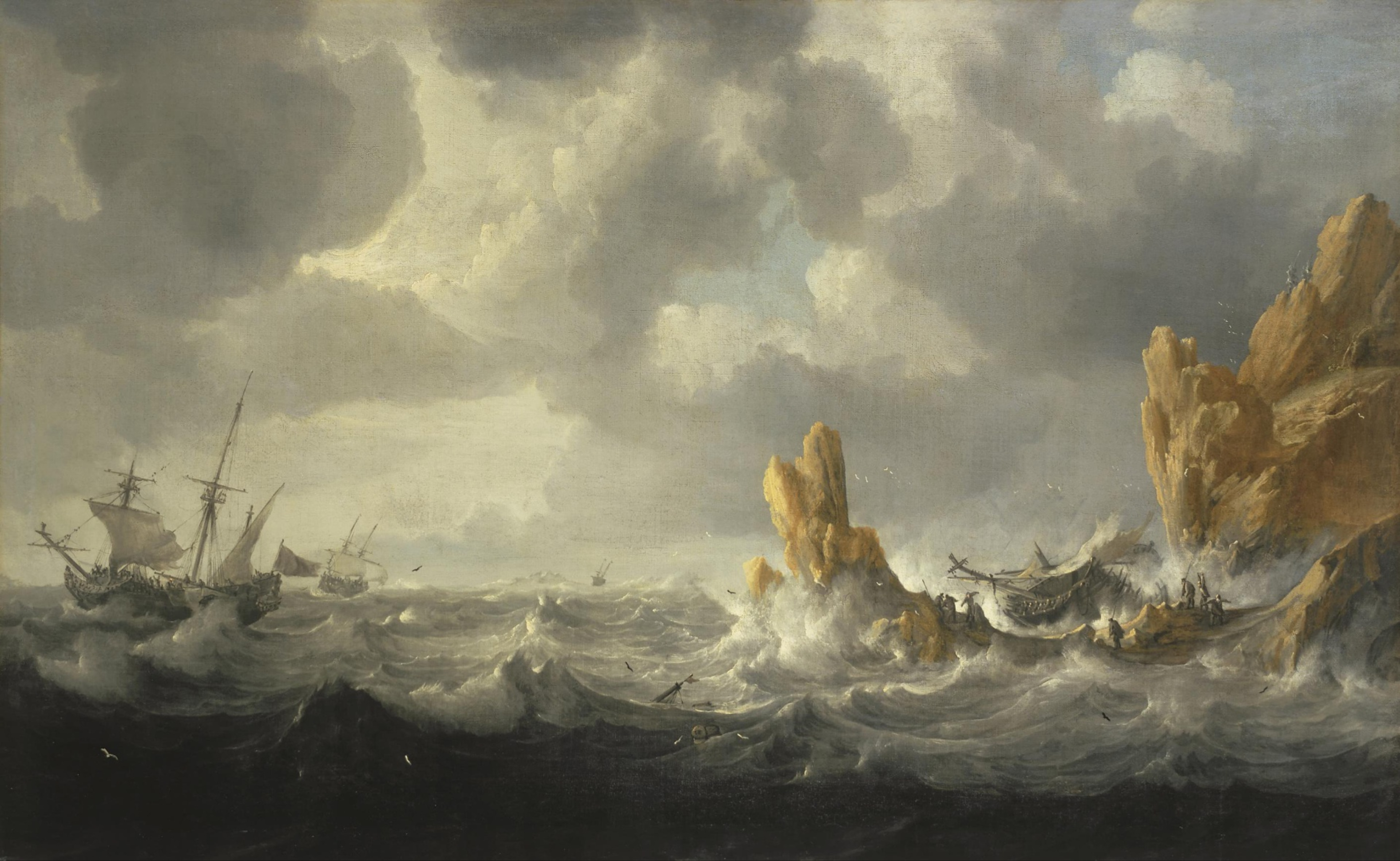
Stormy sea

He was active in Hoboken near Antwerp from 1645 to 1654, likely working in his brother Bonaventura's workshop. In 1654 he married Catherine Buseliers and moved back to Antwerp. The couple had two children, Johannes Franciscus and Isabella. Johannes Franciscus became a painter about whom very little is known with certainty.

In 1659 Jan Peeters spent six months in the Dutch Republic drawing panoramas of several towns and harbours. These were later engraved by Gaspar Bouttats. Because of his many drawings of distant locations he is believed to have travelled throughout France, Italy, Libya, Cairo and Jerusalem. However, it is equally possible that for some of these drawings he relied on designs of other artists, such as his nephew Bonaventura II who was reportedly a merchant sailor as well as an artist.

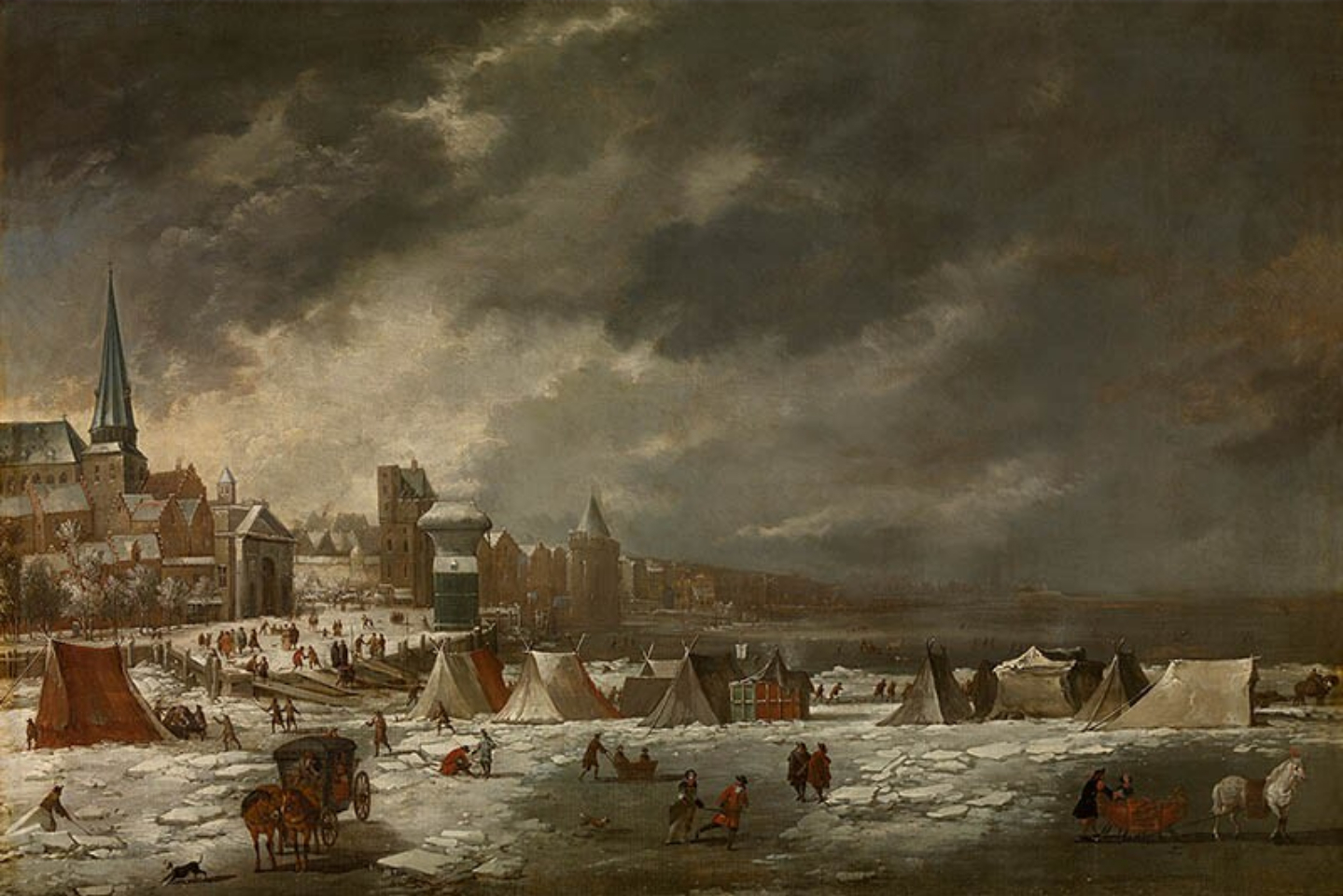
The frozen Scheldt in Antwerp

He was the teacher of Adriaen van Bloemen. He died in Antwerp.

== Work ==
Jan's brother Bonaventura was a master in the painting of dramatic shipwrecks with dark billowy clouds. Jan was trained by his brother and painted marine subjects in a style similar to that of his brother without reaching, however, the same level of painterly excellence. His subjects ranged from domestic marine scenes to Mediterranean settings. Some paintings represent naval battles and naval attacks on fortresses. He painted rough seas with shipwrecks and ships sailing in calm waters. He was good at representing atmospheric conditions, especially of clouds. He also painted city views as well as some portraits. It is likely that the landscapes with fantastic architecture and figures in the collection of the Hermitage Museum attributed to him are in fact the work by the Flemish architectural painter Jacob Balthasar Peeters.

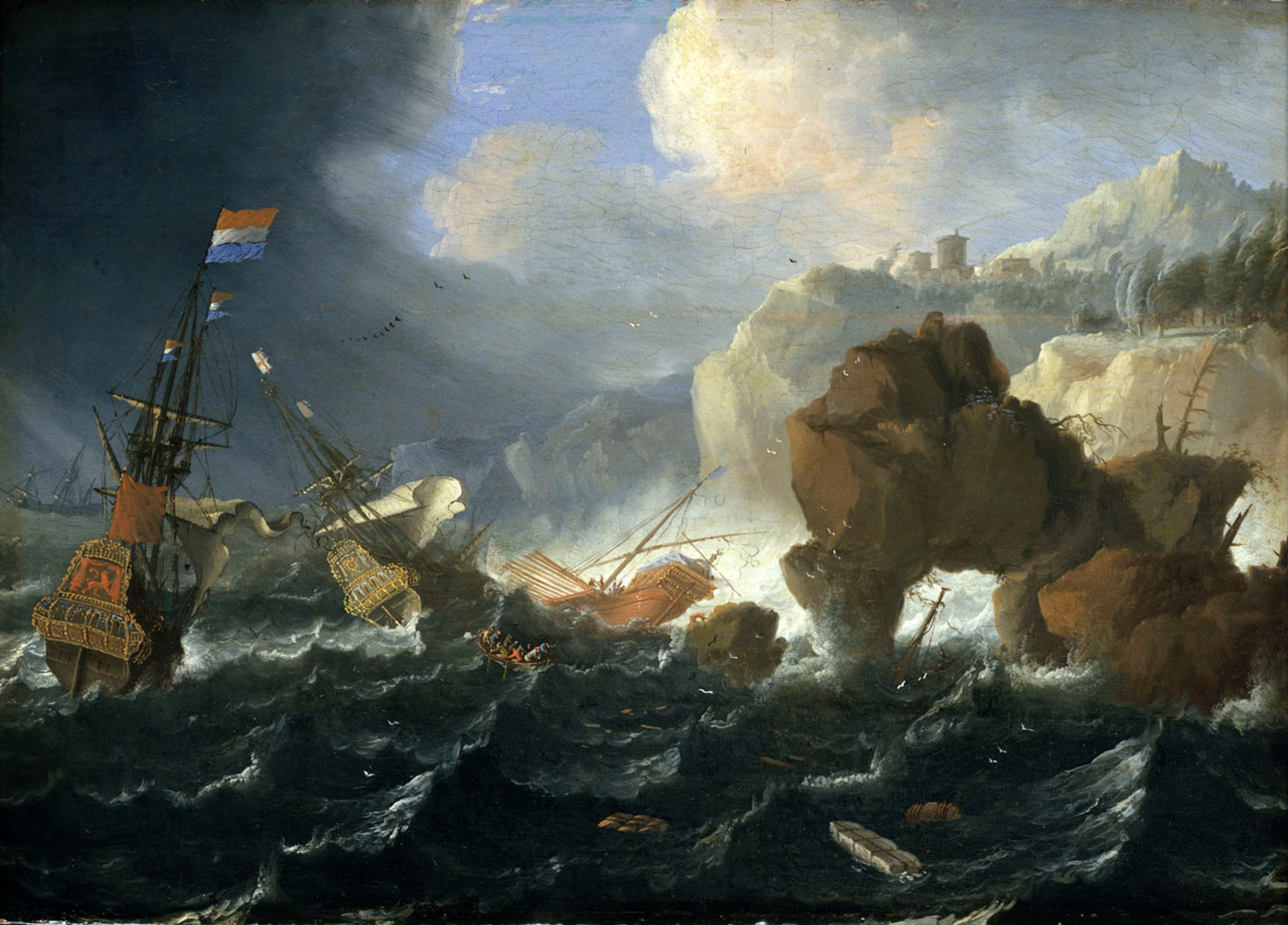
Ships and a galley wrecked on a rocky coast

Jan Peeters is further known for his topographical drawings of various locations that were used as designs by different engravers. Wenceslaus Hollar engraved in 1651 a set of six plates of ports etched by Hollar after various artists after drawings by Peeters and other artists. The Flemish engraver Gaspar Bouttats etched the 14 plates for a folio volume of city views of Jerusalem and the surrounding areas published in 1672 by the publisher Jacobus Peeters under the title Views from Arabia, Judea, Chaldea, Syria, Jerusalem, Antiochia, Aleppo, Mecca etc. after drawings by Jan Peeters (I).

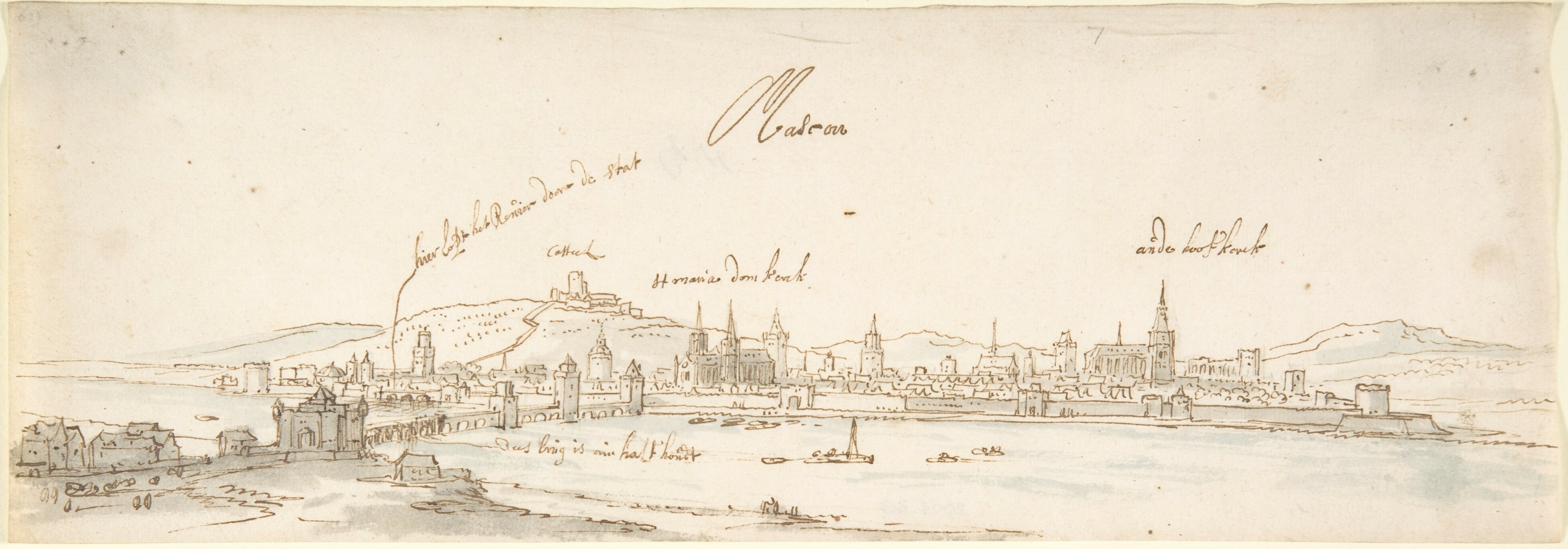
View of Mâcon Seen from the East

Bouttats also used drawings by Jan Peeters (I) for the 1674 publication Thooneel der Steden ende Sterckten van t'Vereenight Nederlandt met d'aengrensende Plaetsen soo in Brabandt Vlaenderen als anden Rhijn en elders verovert door de Waepenen der Groot-moghende Heeren Staeten onder het gheley vande seer Edele Hooghghebore Princen va Oranien (Scene of the Cities and the Forts of the United Netherlands with the Neighbouring Places like Brabant, Flanders and on the Rhine and Conquered Elsewhere by the Weapons of the Great and Mighty Sovereign States under the Leadership of the Very Noble Prince of Orange). This publication contained views of the major cities and forts in the Dutch Republic, Flanders and along the Rhine.

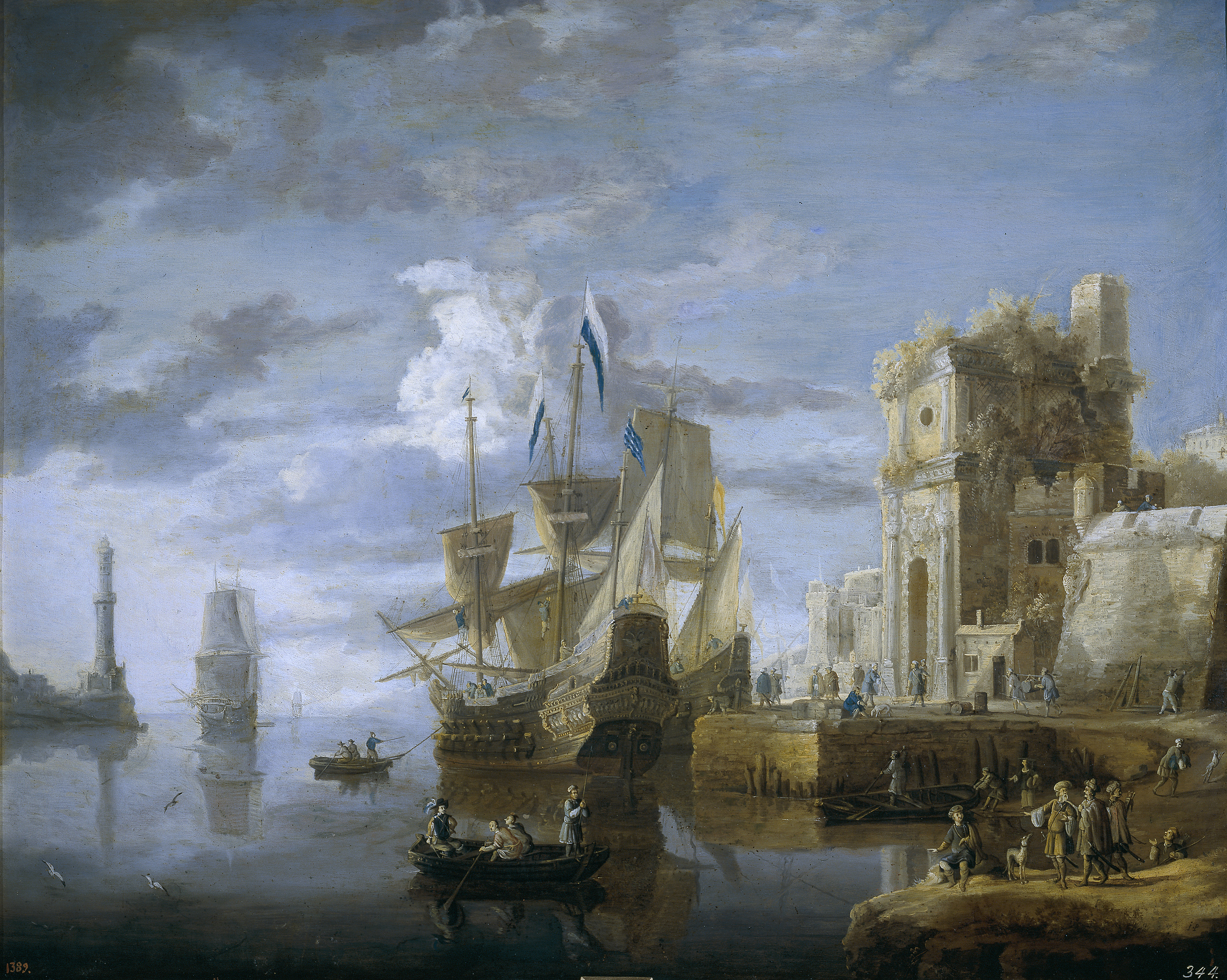
View of a port

Drawings by Jan Peeters were the basis for some of the prints engraved by Gaspar Bouttats and Lucas Vorsterman II for the publication by Jacob Peeters in Antwerp of several sets of prints issued under the title Description des principales villes, havres et isles du golfe de Venise du cote oriental, comme aussi des villes et fortresses de la Moree et quelques places de la Grece et es isles principales de l'Archipel et fortresses dícelles et en suittes quelques places renommées de la Terre Saincte, et autres dessous la domination Ottomane vers le Midij et l'Orient, et quelques principales villes en Perse et le regne du Grand Mogol le tout en Abrege. This was a series of maps and views of locations in Southern Europe, Northern Africa and the Middle East.
