= Vlaamse Televisie Sterren =

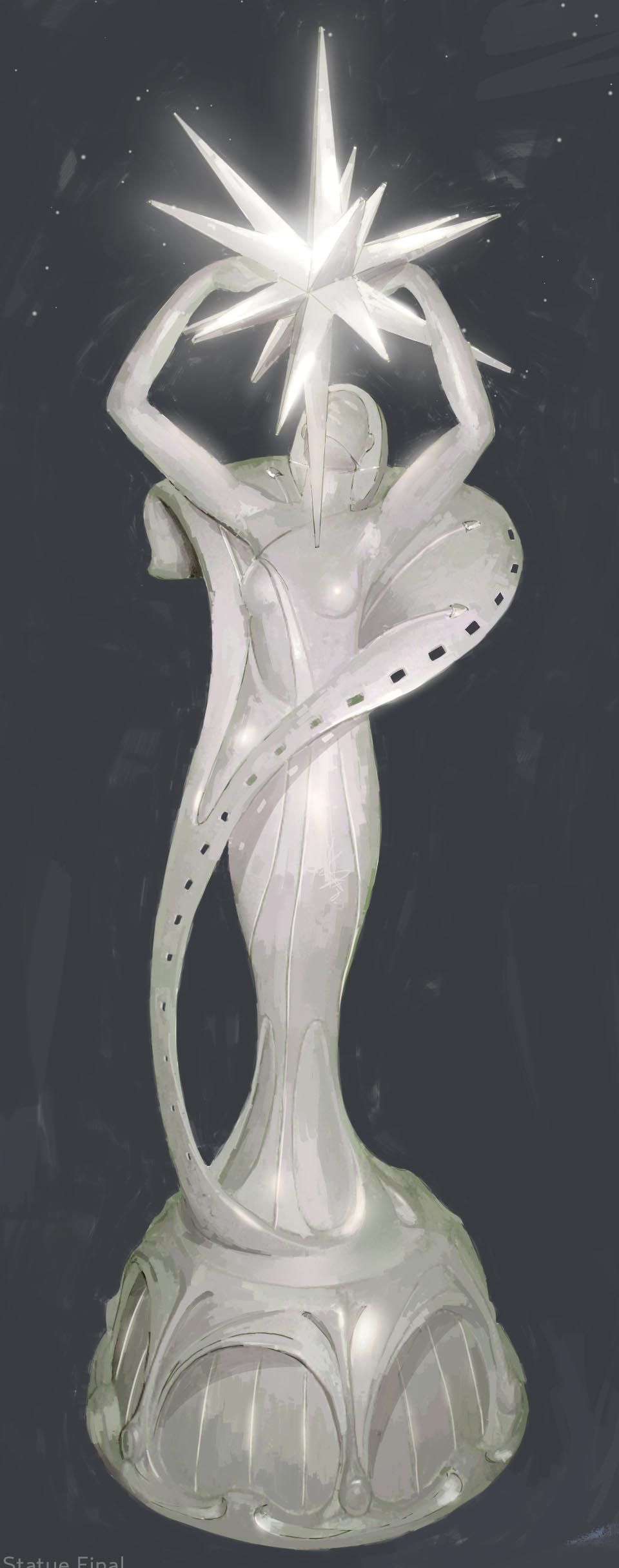
A Vlaamse Televisie Ster statuette (draft)

The Vlaamse Televisie Sterren (Dutch for "Flemish Television Stars") are Flemish television awards, in fifteen categories. Winners are announced during an annual television show called Night of the Flemish Television Stars (Dutch: Nacht van de Vlaamse Televisie Sterren), which is an Oscar-style gala organised by the Flemish Television Academy (Vlaamse Televisie Academie). Each year categories are evaluated and adapted to the ever-changing trends of television if needed.

Every ceremony is aired on television. The rights to the ceremony are shared by the two leading television stations in Flanders: public television station Eén and commercial station vtm. The show is co-hosted, but broadcast by only one of the two aforementioned channels in turn. The most recent ceremony was held on the second of March 2013 and aired by vtm. Night of the Flemish Television Stars first aired in 2008 and is a follow-up to Het Gala van het Gouden Oog (Gala of the Golden Eye), which was last broadcast in 1998.

== Categories ==
The public votes by means of internet and televoting for the following categories:

- Most Popular Television Personality
- Most Popular Television Program

Members of the academy's Board of Management vote for:

- the "Rising Star", for the best newcomer to Flemish television.
- the "Career Star", to honor someone's outstanding career in Flemish television.

The other categories are voted for by members of the academy:

- Best Actor
- Best Actress
- Best male Presenter
- Best female Presenter
- Best Drama
- Best Reality Show
- Best Entertaining Show
- Best Lifestyle Program
- Best Comedy Show
- Best Documentary Program
- Best Informative Program

== Voting procedure ==
Voting in the last categories proceeds in two steps:

1. Members of the academy nominate four favorites in each category. These results are processed into a general shortlist with 4 nominations in each category.
2. In a second round of voting Academy members choose their personal favorites from the shortlist, in each category. The personality or program with the most votes wins the Vlaamse Televisie Ster.

== Nominations and winners ==
NOTE: certain categories have been adjusted, added or cancelled over the years.

=== Best Actor and Actress ===
Note: In 2008 the categories Best Actor and Best Actress were combined, with Veerle Baetens being awarded Best Actor/Actress.

Year	Winner Best Actor	Other Nominees
2008	none	Jan Decleir (De Kavijaks)
2009	Matthias Schoenaerts (De Smaak van De Keyser)	Koen De Bouw (Vermist), Peter Van Den Begin (Matroesjka's 2; Fans), Lucas Van den Eynde (Aspe)
2010	Koen De Graeve (Van Vlees en Bloed)	Herwig Ilegems (Van Vlees en Bloed), Lucas Van den Eynde (Van Vlees en Bloed), Tom Van Dijck (Van Vlees en Bloed)
2011	Peter Van Den Begin (Oud België)	Walter Baele (Tegen de sterren op), Herwig Ilegems (Duts), Mike Verdrengh (De Rodenburgs)
2012	Koen De Graeve (De Ronde)	Guga Baúl (Tegen de sterren op), Ben Segers (Wat als?), Bruno Vanden Broecke (Wat als?)
2013	Dirk Roofthooft (Clan)	Guga Baúl (Tegen de sterren op; Vermist), Ben Segers (Quiz me Quick; De zonen van Van As; Loslopend wild), Geert Van Rampelberg (Code 37; Clan; Zingaburia)
2014	Matteo Simoni (Safety First)	Ben Segers (Safety First), Bruno Vanden Broecke (Safety First), Wim Willaert (Eigen kweek)
2015	Matteo Simoni (Amateurs; Safety First)	Guga Baúl (Tegen de sterren op), Ben Segers (De Biker Boys; De zonen van Van As; Loslopend Wild; Safety First), Jonas Van Geel (Amateurs; De Biker Boys; De zonen van Van As; Tegen de sterren op)
2016	Koen De Bouw (T.)	Kris Cuppens (Spitsbroers), Piet De Praitere (Bevergem), Wim Willaert (Bevergem)

Year	Winner Best Actress	Other Nominees
2008	Veerle Baetens (Sara)	Sandrine André (Sara), Karlijn Sileghem (Katarakt)
2009	Hilde De Baerdemaeker (LouisLouise)	Veerle Baetens (Sara), Maaike Cafmeyer (Aspe), Karlijn Sileghem (Katarakt)
2010	Sien Eggers (Van Vlees en Bloed)	Veerle Baetens (Code 37), Reinhilde Decleir (Van Vlees en Bloed), Maaike Neuville (Van Vlees en Bloed)
2011	Nathalie Meskens (Tegen de sterren op)	Els Dottermans (Oud België), Barbara Sarafian (Tegen de sterren op), Marie Vinck (De Rodenburgs)
2012	Sien Eggers (Red Sonja)	Veerle Baetens (Code 37), Clara Cleymans (Tegen de sterren op), Nathalie Meskens (Tegen de sterren op)
2013	Tine Embrechts (Quiz Me Quick; Tegen de sterren op)	Veerle Baetens (Code 37), Inge Paulussen (Clan; Loslopend Wild), Barbara Sarafian (Clan; Tegen de sterren op)
2014	Sien Eggers (Eigen kweek)	Maaike Cafmeyer (Eigen kweek), Clara Cleymans (De Ridder), Nathalie Meskens (Connie & Clyde)
2015	Barbara Sarafian (Achter de Feiten; In Vlaamse velden; Tegen de sterren op)	Ruth Beeckmans (Amateurs; Safety First, Vriendinnen), Clara Cleymans (De Ridder; Tegen de sterren op), Ella Leyers (Amateurs; Tegen de sterren op)
2016	Ann Tuts (Bevergem)	Tiny Bertels (Loslopend Wild & Gevogelte), Maaike Cafmeyer (Bevergem), Ella Leyers (T.)

=== Best Male Presenter and Female Presenter ===
Note: In 2008 the categories Best Male Presenter and Best Female Presenter were combined, however no female presenters were nominated for the award.

Year	Winner Best Male Presenter	Other Nominees
2008	Erik Van Looy (Eén)	Tom Lenaerts (Eén), Peter Van de Veire (Eén), Koen Wauters (Vtm)
2009	Erik Van Looy (Slimste Mens ter Wereld)	Tom Lenaerts (De Pappenheimers), Peter Van de Veire (Peter Live), Koen Wauters (Alles Moet Weg; Moeders en Dochters)
2010	Erik Van Looy (Slimste Mens ter Wereld)	Tom Lenaerts (De Pappenheimers), Bart Peeters (Mag ik u kussen?), Marcel Vanthilt (Ook Getest op Mensen)
2011	Marcel Vanthilt (Villa Vanthilt)	Bram Van Deputte (De Dagshow), Lieven Van Gils (Reyers Laat), Koen Wauters (De Juiste Prijs)
2012	Steven Van Herreweghe (De Pappenheimers)	Jeroen Meus (Dagelijkse kost), Marcel Vanthilt (Villa Vanthilt), Koen Wauters (Idool 2011)
2013	Lieven Van Gils (Reyers Laat)	Paul de Leeuw (Manneke Paul), Erik Van Looy (De Slimste Mens ter Wereld), Koen Wauters (Belgium's Got Talent)
2014	Koen Wauters (vtm)	Otto-Jan Ham (VIER), Jonas Van Geel (vtm), Erik Van Looy (VIER)
2015	Thomas Vanderveken (Alleen Elvis blijft bestaan)	Otto-Jan Ham (De Ideale Wereld), Jonas Van Geel (Lang Leve...; Zijn er nog kroketten?), Erik Van Looy (De Slimste Mens ter Wereld)
2016	Mathias Coppens & Stef Coppens (Het Lichaam van Coppens)	Ben Crabbé (Blokken), Jonas Van Geel (Jonas & Van Geel), Erik Van Looy (De Slimste Mens ter Wereld)

Year	Winner Best Female Presenter	Other Nominees
2008	none	none
2009	Phara de Aguirre (Phara)	Roos Van Acker (Peking Express), Francesca Vanthielen (Sterren op de Dansvloer; De Italiaanse Droom), Frieda Van Wijck (De Laatste Show)
2010	Phara de Aguirre (Phara)	Dina Tersago (Boer zkt Vrouw), Frieda Van Wijck (De Laatste Show), Yasmine (De Rode Loper; Zo is er Maar Eén)
2011	An Lemmens (De Dagshow)	Phara de Aguirre (Panorama), Martine Tanghe (Het Journaal), Frieda Van Wijck (De Klas van Frieda)
2012	An Lemmens (The Voice van Vlaanderen)	Martine Tanghe (Het Journaal), Francesca Vanthielen (My Name Is), Frieda Van Wijck (De Klas van Frieda)
2013	Martine Tanghe (Het Journaal; Verkiezingsshow)	An Lemmens (So You Think You Can Dance), Francesca Vanthielen (Cijfers liegen niet; Sterren op de Dansvloer), Frieda Van Wijck (De Klas van Frieda)
2014	Kathleen Cools (Eén)	An Lemmens (vtm), Cath Luyten (Eén), Nathalie Meskens (vtm)
2015	Nathalie Meskens (Beste Kijkers; Reclame AUB)	Kathleen Cools (Reyers Laat), Sofie Lemaire (Bloot en Speren), Martine Tanghe (Het Journaal)
2016	Karen Damen (Perfect)	Lieve Blancquaert (Wedding Day), Nathalie Meskens (Beste Kijkers), Martine Tanghe (Het Journaal)
