= Sandrine André =

Belgian actress (born 1973)

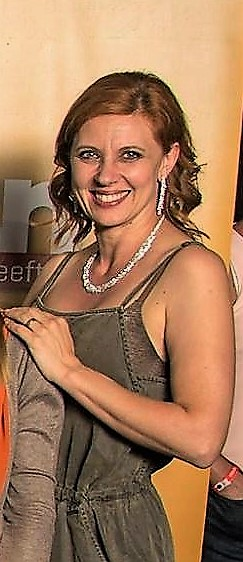

Sandrine André (born 22 February 1973 in Antwerp, Belgium) is a Flemish actress. The daughter of Dutch actor Bert André and Flemish actress Mieke Verheyden, she is married to the actor Hans Ligtvoet.

She became famous for her role in the Vtm-series Wittekerke where she played Merel and her role as Inge in the movies and series of Team Spirit. In 2007 she became popular for her role as Britt in Sara for which she was nominated in 2007 for a Vlaamse Televisiester as Best Actress for that role.

== Filmography ==
- Tabu (2010) as Barbara (Short film)
- Team Spirit 2 (2003) as Inge
- Oog in oog (1995) as Marie
- De Dode (1979)
- De Herberg in het Misverstand (1976) as Jongetje

== TV series ==
- Vermist (2015) - Maureen
- Amigo's (2015) - Machteld
- Famillie (2012) - Veronique
- Zone Stad (2011) - Inez Vermeulen
- Wolven (2010)
- David - Lotte Naessens
- Happy Together (2009) - Different characters
- Aspe (2008) - Nadine Verschaert
- Sara (2007–2008) - Britt Van Hove
- It takes two (2007) - herself (winner)
- F.C. De Kampioenen Season 17 episode 3 "Spaghetti Championaise" and episode 11 "Proost" (2006) - Willeke
- Team Spirit - de serie 2 (2005) - Inge
- Rupel (2004) - Chantal
- Witse (2004) - Tigla Fonteyne
- Team Spirit - de serie (2003) - Inge
- Recht op Recht (2001) - Sarah Aerts
- Wittekerke (2000–2006) - Merel De Meester
- Flikken (2000) - Caro
- Heterdaad (1997) - Sarah Verhoeven
- Wat nu weer (1995) - Kitty
- Kats en Co (1994) - Monique Albers
- Meester (1993)
- Suite 215 (1991) - Lenie

== Theatre play ==
- Het opvoeden van Rita (2011) - Rita
- Cyrano de Bergerac (2007) - Roxane
