= Johan Verstreken =

Flemish politician

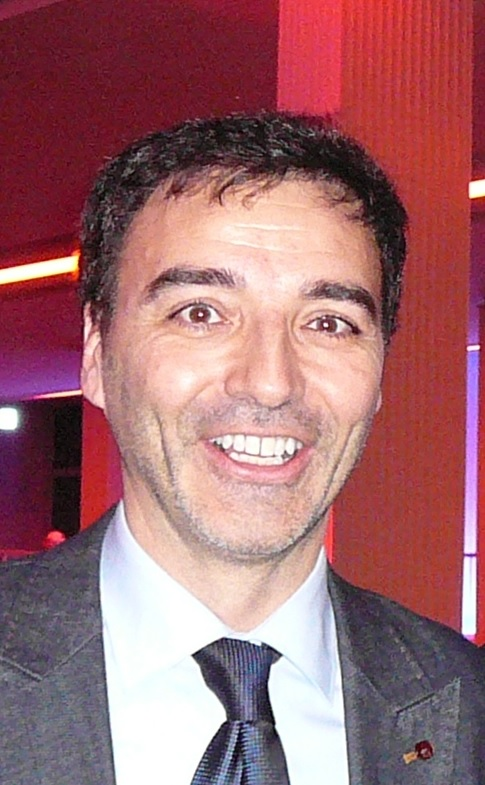

Member of the Flemish Parliament
- Incumbent
- Assumed office 2004

Personal details
- Born: 11 June 1964 (age 61) Ostend, Belgium
- Party: CD&V
- Profession: Presenter
- Website: www.johanverstreken.be

Johan Laurent Alfons Verstreken (born 11 June 1964 in Ostend) is a Flemish politician, who has served as a member of CD&V party since 2004. He started his career back in 1989 as a TV presenter and announcer for the Flemish Broadcaster VRT.

During his time on VRT, he worked with presenters such as Luc Appermont, Dana Winner, Bart Peeters and Michel Follet. He also hosted editions of the show Blokken, when Ben Crabbé was unavailable to host.

In 2004 he resigned from his 25 years on Television and joined the CD&V, for which he currently serves as a Member of the Flemish Parliament. Since 2013 he is also a Community Senator.

He outed himself publicly as gay in his own book in 2015, his first experience was in recent years.
