= David (TV series) =

Belgian Dutch-language telenovela

- Series poster
- Created by: Studio-A
- Starring: Jeroen Van Dyck; Nathalie Meskens; Pieter Bamps; Kurt Rogiers
- Opening theme: "Nature Boy" — Brahim
- Country of origin: Belgium
- Original language: Dutch (Flemish)
- No. of episodes: 208

Production
- Producer: Studio-A
- Production locations: Koksijde, Belgium
- Running time: 25 min (approx. 22 min)

Original release
- Network: vtm
- Release: 18 September 2009 – 30 June 2010

Related
- successor of LouisLouise

David is a Flemish telenovela. It was the third telenovela of Vtm and it followed the highly successful Sara and its successor LouisLouise. The first episodes were filmed in the Dominican Republic, the other episodes were filmed in Koksijde and the studios in Lint. It aired for the first time on 18 September 2009. The first two episodes were screened for a selective audience at the casino of Koksijde at 15 September. It was the first Flemish telenovela of Vtm that had a unique story and was entirely created for Flanders. The story is about a young boy, David, who gets lost on an island. He is found there after 15 years by a young woman who brings him to civilization.

== Story ==
During an exotic holiday boat trip in the Dominican Republic, David falls from its boat and gets separated from his family. His family starts a search but without any result. They stop searching because the authorities makes them believe that David drowned in the water. But David survived but with amnesia, and ended up on a lost island without any living human.

15 years later David is discovered by Sofie Klaerhout, a young woman who is travelling with her family. The family Klaerhout brings David to their home city Koksijde to modern civilization where David has to adapt himself. Sofie and the gardener of the family, Maarten, take care about David but not everybody has such good intentions with the young man.

Step by step, David becomes able to enter modern civilization. By doing this, his memory returns. Sofie and David become very close and fall in love. Sofie starts a search for David's family. At the end, Sofie is able to reunite David with his father. David and Sofie get married and travel with David's father to Miami. Together, David and Sofie will start a new life in the area around the Amazon.

=== Main cast ===
Character	Actor/Actress
David Verbeecke	Jeroen Van Dyck
Sofie Klaarhout	Nathalie Meskens
Pieter Wellens	Pieter Bamps
Herman Klaerhout	Mark Vandenbos
Andrea Verbiest	Kristine Van Pellicom
Maarten Dieleman	Kurt Rogiers
Delphine Klaerhout	Daisy Van Praet
Sander Verbiest	Steve Aernoudts
Tim Klaerhout	Bram Van Outryve
Robbie Stevaert	Ides Meire
Ludo Wellens	Warre Borgmans
Bea Vaerenberg	Katelijne Verbeke
Lotte Naessens	Sandrine André
Stijn Poucke	Senne Dehandschutter

== Ratings ==
David's first episode had an average of 716,000 viewers (it was broadcast in prime time at 8:35 pm. The second episode was broadcast at its regular hour, 6:30 pm. This ensured a fall in viewers of more than 50%. The ratings of David kept decreasing and had an average of 317,000 viewers.

At the end of the telenovela, VTM moved David to prime time again (for the last twenty episodes), ratings increased and reached an average of 660,000 viewers. The final episode gathered 714,001 viewers.

Vtm was disappointed with the lower ratings then David's successors Sara and LouisLouise but decided to greenlight a fourth telenovela, Ella.
