= Clara Cleymans =

Belgian actress (born 1989)

- Cleymans in 2025
- Born: 5 January 1989 (age 37); Wilrijk, Belgium
- Education: Lemmensinstituut; University of Antwerp
- Occupations: Actress; singer
- Years active: 1999–present
- Spouse: Jo Mahieu (m. 2014)
- Children: 2
- Parents: Jan Cleymans (father); Karin Jacobs (actress) (mother)
- Family: Jelle Cleymans (brother)

Clara Cleymans (born 5 January 1989) is a Belgian actress and musical theatre singer.

== Early years and education ==
She was born on 5 January 1989 in Wilrijk, as the second child of Karin Jacobs and Jan Cleymans. She has an older brother, named Jelle. She attended the Lemmensinstituut in Leuven, and then the philosophy department of the University of Antwerp.

== Career ==
She began her acting career when she was 8 years old, and appeared as Klaartje in a 1997 episode of the Belgian television series Samson en Gert. Her film debut came in 1999 by appearing as Liese in De Kabouterschat. She had the same role in the following sequels as well, Plop in de Wolken (2000) and Plop en de Toverstaf (2003).

After having minor roles in various television series, she had her first leading role in the one-season VTM series Dag & Nacht: Hotel Eburon (2010) as Amber Claessens. Between 2010 and 2011, she portrayed Nina Oostvoghels, one of the main characters at that time of the Eén series Thuis. She imitated various celebrities and public figures, and had different characters in the VTM satirical series Tegen de sterren op between 2010 and 2018 . For her performances in the series, she was awarded with the Rising Star award in the Vlaamse Televisie Sterren 2011, and nominated for the Best Actress in the 2012 edition of the awards. Cleymans continued her film career with Kill Me Please (2010) and Groenten uit Balen (2011). She portrayed public prosecutor Helena De Ridder, the leading role of the four-season Eén series De Ridder (2013–2016). She was nominated for the Best Actress in the 2014 and 2015 editions of the Vlaamse Televisie Sterren, for the performances in De Ridder, and De Ridder and Tegen de sterren op respectively.

Between 2018 and 2019, she portrayed Sarah Liebman, a Jewish girl that has a love affair with a non-Jewish guy Louis Segers (Jonas Van Geel) in a dramatic musical theatre '40-'45 that set during World War II. In the Belgian comedy horror zombie movie Yummy (2019), she played the hospital director Janja, one of the leading roles in the movie. She appeared as Els and shared the main role with Rik Verheye in We moeten eens praten, the Eén mini-series that started to air in January 2021.

== Personal life ==
She married Jo Mahieu in 2014. The couple has two children, Jeanne (born 2016) and Romy (born 2019).

== Filmography ==
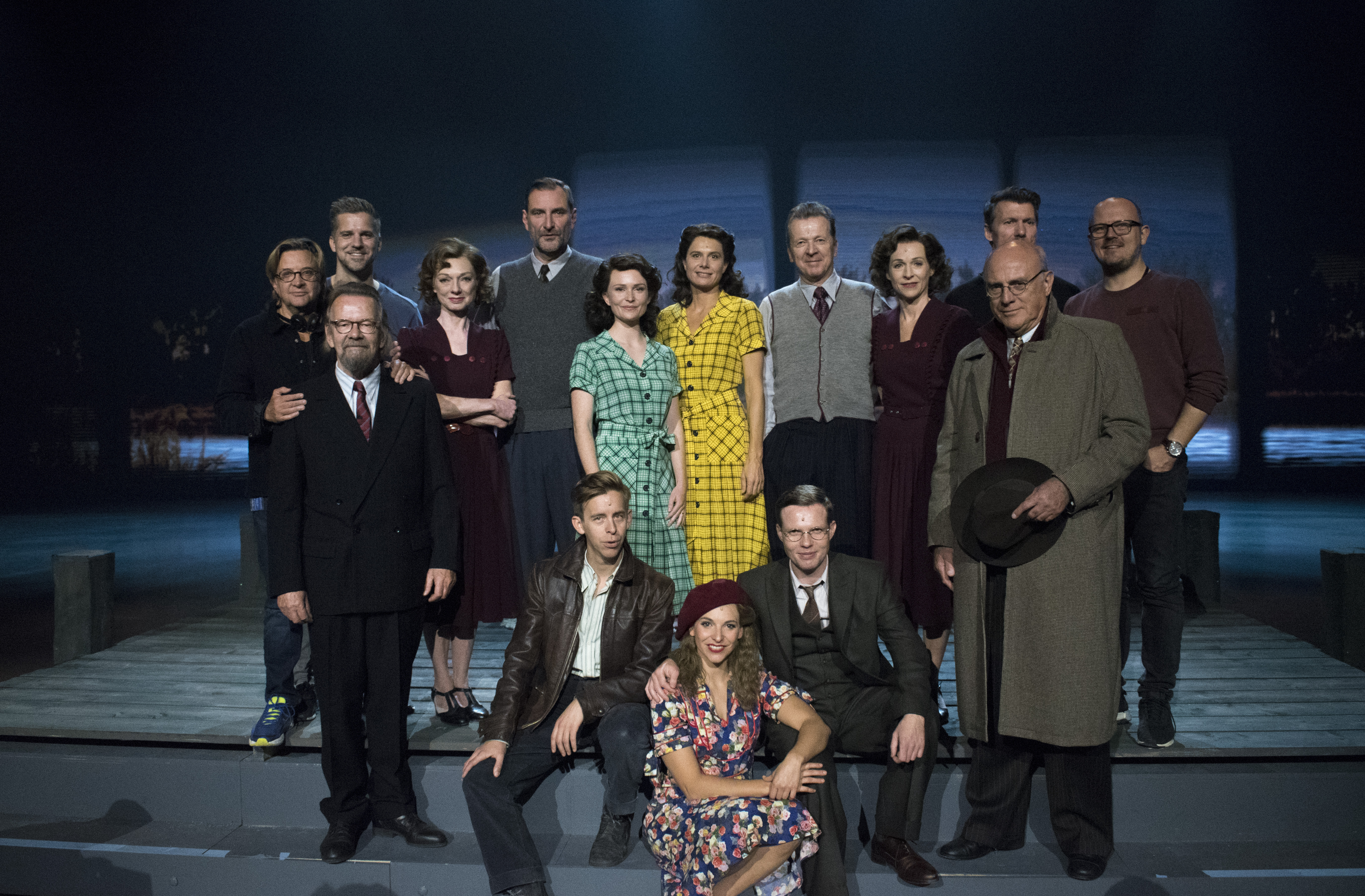
Cast and crew of '40-'45 (Clara Cleymans is the one with the green dress, September 2018)

Film
Year	Title	Role	Notes
1999	De Kabouterschat	Liese	
2000	Plop in de Wolken	Liese	
2003	Plop en de Toverstaf	Liese	
2008	Happy Together	Julie Daelemans	
2010	A Turtle's Tale: Sammy's Adventures	Snow	Voice of the Dutch version
2010	Kill Me Please	Mlle Julia	
2011	Hammertime	Cherry	Short film
2011	Chit Chat	Anna	Short film
2011	Groenten uit Balen	Anlice	
2011	The Smurfs	Smurfette	Voice of the Dutch version
2013	The Smurfs 2	Smurfette	Voice of the Dutch version
2016	Bottom-Up	Eefje	Short film
2019	Yummy	Janja	

Television
Year	Title	Role	Notes
1997	Samson en Gert	Klaartje	Episode: "De hamster van Octaaf"
1998	Heterdaad	Clara Piron	Season 3 episode 6
1999	Flikken	Cara Goffin	Episode: "Partners"
2002	Spoed	Sandie Vermeire	Episode: "Stadsplannen"
2004	Rupel	Rilke Goeminne	Episode: "De kroon"
2006	F.C. De Kampioenen	Leentje	Episode: "De eerste prijs"
2006	Aspe	Tania Janssen	Episode: "Kinderen van de nacht"
2006–2007	De Kavijaks		Episodes: "Marcella" and "Belinda"
2008	Vermist	Isabelle Maes	Episode: "Baby Alisha"
2010	F.C. De Kampioenen	Fien	Episode: "Bella Africa"
2010	Dag & Nacht: Hotel Eburon	Amber Claessens	12 episodes
2010	Witse	Sienna	Episode: "Klare Lijn"
2010–2011	Thuis	Nina Oostvoghels	159 episodes
2010–2018	Tegen de sterren op	Various roles and imitations	88 episodes
2011	Mega Mindy	Natalia Tkofschip	Episode: "De Bompiano"
2011	Code 37	Vicky Renders	13 episodes
2011	Zonde van de zendtijd	Inspecteur de Babe	Season 3 episode 8
2011	Quiz Me Quick	Monica	10 episodes
2012	Aspe	Brenda Schepens / Dorothy Kahn	Episode: "Lüger"
2013–2016	De Ridder	Helena De Ridder	48 episodes
2018	Connie & Clyde 2	Wendy / Wanda	Episode: "Wendy weet van Wanda"
2019–2020	Dit zijn wij	Fiona Maas	4 episodes
2021	We moeten eens praten	Els	
2021	Hidden Assets	Carolyn	3 episodes
2021	Match	Laura	10 episodes

Stage
Year	Title	Role	Notes
1999	Assepoester	Young Assepoester	Musical
2001	Kuifje: De zonnetempel	Zorrinho	Musical
2011	De Koepoort 15	Sara	
2011–2012	Fiddler on the Roof	Chava	Musical
2013	Diep in mij	Yasmine	
2014	Costa Blanca		
2015	Figaro	Rosine/Contessa	
2016–2017	Club 27		
2017	Our Mutual Friend (Onze Wederzijdse Vriend)	Lizzie/Venuz	
2017	Kleinkunsteiland		
2018	Così	Despina	Musical
2018–2019	'40-'45	Sarah Liebman	Musical
2019	Les Enfants du Paradis	Garance	

== Awards and nominations ==
Award	Ceremony date	Category	Work	Result
Vlaamse Televisie Sterren	25 February 2011	Rising Star	Tegen de sterren op	Won
Vlaamse Televisie Sterren	24 March 2012	Best Actress	Tegen de sterren op	Nominated
Vlaamse Televisie Sterren	15 March 2014	Best Actress	De Ridder	Nominated
Vlaamse Televisie Sterren	18 April 2015	Best Actress	De Ridder, Tegen de sterren op	Nominated
