= List of Heterdaad episodes =

Heterdaad is a Belgian television series that originally aired on Eén from 1996 to 1999 and handles about the activities of BOB, the former Belgian security and search brigade which was part of the gendarmerie. It was the intention to produce 5 seasons but as the BOB was dismantled season 5 was never made. 40 episodes were made over four seasons.

== Series overview ==
Season	Episode numbers	# of episodes	(Belgium) Year aired
1	1 - 10	10	1996
2	11 - 20	10	1997
3	21 - 30	10	1998
4	31 - 40	10	1999

== Episodes ==
=== Season 1 (1996) ===
No.
1
Liddy Goderis is found dead. According her neighbour Marcel she frequently had sex with Alex, a male prostitute. Her body is washed and the house is completely cleaned. Most of her jewellery is stolen but not the negotiable instruments.
2
Serge Graulus shoots down a manufacturer of fur coats. It seems such coats were frequently stolen during last weeks. Miss Petra Lamal recognizes her recently stolen ring in the display window of a jewellery. The jeweller claims it was Petra herself who sold him her ring. Furthermore Petra has a relationship with Serge who hides in her house.
3
During a fight between Steve Hoste and Martin Baelen, Martin dies. According witnesses Martin accidentally fell on the ground so his death is no direct result of the fight. Matti finds out Andrea Daniels had a relationship with Martin before she met Steve. So the root cause of the fight is most probably a dispute about the love affair. However, after more investigation it seems Steve forced Andrea to give him trade secrets of the company in which she and Martin work. It is now assumed Martin found out. Sylvain remembers the name of Steve Hoste and after some research Steve was involved with the Russian mafia some years before.
4
Taxi driver Cyriel Stroobants is murdered. He had many debts and his house owner even threatened to throw him out. The same evening bank clerk Mertens is also a victim of a robbery: the 20 million Belgian Francs he just picked up at a client were stolen.
5
Someone broke in at the house of Hugo Platel, a man who trades rapeseed. A video tape is missing which contains footage in which European civil servant Niederbacher offers favourable contracts to distribute the rapeseed inside the European Union. When Niederbacher is found dead, it looks like a suicide, but the team of John Nauelaerts is certain he was murdered.
6
Some years ago Arno Collet robbed a jewellery in which the daughter of the jeweller seriously got maimed for life. Arno is now set free and is stalked by Boumans. When another jeweller is robbed, the absconded Arno is thought to be the wrongdoer. However, during a new investigation it turns out Boumans handled in illegal diamonds.
7
Captain Colman, who has a high military rank, lives in with the Godon family. Father Godon is a former professional soldier but got a work accident and is in a wheelchair since then. Colman took over authority in the family and raises Tamara Godon with a hard hand. Tamara is found strangled in the park. She frequently visited some pub where joints are smoked. After her death several naked photos of her turn up. Matti thinks captain Colman is involved, but according witnesses some shady boy was in the park at the evening of the murder. His alibi is not fully true.
8
Oswald Nys, a physiatrist, frequently invites prostitutes to his home to have sadomasochism. He then pays them a lot of money to keep silent. Akkim, an African woman, dies during such love-making. It's then that Sylvia Van Dyck, a former victim of Oswald, calls the BOB to make an appointment. She never turns up and her body is found not much later.
9
The team of Matti can free a toddler after it was abducted by his father Marco Beckers. Marco claims the stepfather of the child is a criminal, crook and fence in antique. The team investigates the case with the given evidence. It turns out the stepfather is a suspect in the unsolved murder of a antiquair.
10
Juan, on parole, worked in the golf club of Patrick Mariman but was fired after a theft. He now stole the car of Patrick as he was sure some expensive objects were hidden in it. Juan is shot down and Noel and Roger, two friends of Juan, are the main suspects as they would get a part of the loot.

=== Season 2 (1997) ===
No.
11
Nico, a deaf-mute boy, is interrogated by the team of John as he was a witness of a failed robbery in which a cashier was shot down. An interpreter is called to do the translation. Also Dennis Verdonck was shot down as he most probably could read the number plate of the robbers car. Nico continuously makes small changes in his story thus the team thinks he hides something.
12
The BOB is looking after the son of an attorney general as he robbed Gustaaf Peeters and ran away with millions of Belgian francs. The BOB is not yet aware the young man is not involved: his car was stolen by Jos Van Mierlo and Danny Borré whilst he was in the theatre. Jos and Danny have to pay a lot of money to a shady Moroccan credit institution. Gustaaf is an older man who has a second job at an exchange office. Each day he has to transfer a huge amount of Belgian francs by feet. Danny, whose mother is in a relationship with Gustaaf, got aware of this.
13
In a dark alley the body of a raped Nina Heylen is found. Under the body the charge card of Nicole Callens is found. Nicole claims her boyfriend René Stevens, who is an unemployed, aggressive drunk, never uses her car. Soon it is revealed that Nicole lies.
14
After Arnold Someville escaped from prison his cellmate Dirk Van Hout thinks Arnold will rob the company of Dirks parents. Dirk told Arnold about three million of Canadian dollars which can be found over there. Although Arthur Van Hout is informed about this possible robbery, he does not get police protection. That evening Arthur is being waited by Arnold. The money was brought over to a financial institution during the day and a frustrated Arnold shoots Arthur down.
15
Paul Antonis is found murdered. Together with Marc De Laet he ran a business in second-handed cars. They also sell paintings. At the crime scène Clément Goeminne was seen. He is a charming man who is known for scamming and collecting money with claptrap. Paul has an affair with Rita Coppens to which he gave a huge amount of money just before his death.
16
Night guard Hugo De Pauw shoots down a burglar: it seems to be Joel Mattijsen, a former employee. De Pauw thinks Joel was looking for 1 million Belgian francs which is in the safe. Not much later that money is stolen from the safe. An anonymous witness claims the burglar drove away with a white car. This car is owned by Frank, the son of Joel, but he claims to be innocent. He does tell he was there to scare is father and to threaten to kill De Pauw, but changed his mind.
17
Tibo has an affair with Nadia. Both are witnesses of a robbery. Due to their statement the man of Nadia becomes aware of that relationship. Sometime later the wine shop of Raymond Kronenbergs is robbed. Filip, the son of Raymond, does not want an investigation as he wants to hide the incest in his family. Not much later Filip pays with a cheque which was stolen during that robbery.
18
On request by a courier company, the house of their employee Doris De Caluwé is searched. Many packages are found. She stole them to sell hoping she would earn enough money to get breast implants. One of the packages contains heroine, but Doris claims not to be involved. The package is addressed to Chris Van Beek. He claims to have debts at Patrick Lemoine and is forced by him to sell drugs. In exchange for plea bargain Chris helps the team of Matti to arrest the gang.
19
Kevin Cauwenbergs, a promising soccer player, is missing after he had to run in the forest as a penalty given by his trainer Roger Poelaert. Maurice, an uncle of Kevin, starts his own investigation. An anonymous tip leads to Peter Fonteyne, a school teacher of Kevin. When it is revealed Peter is a homosexual, gossips start he is also a paedophilia. Peter has an alibi. The Kevin's body is found.
20
continuation of previous episode Peter did not lie about his alibi. He had a relationship with Guido Pauwels but broke up two weeks earlier. Since then Peter frequently visits the gay nightlife in Brussels together with Zoran, a male prostitute. They were there at the evening of the murder. During this investigation Matti finds out her colleague Willy also visits those gay bars and thus gay. Post-mortem examination shows that Kevin his body is full of steroids and muscle improvers so the investigation leads them back to the board and trainer of the soccer team.

=== Season 3 (1998) ===
No.
21
Kristine, a temporary employee in the team of John as Sylvain broke his hip, finds an undernourished baby in the train station. Drifter Noël Proost, known for several small crimes, is concerned about the baby. This makes him suspicious so he is screened. It turns out Joel works together with a Bosnian gang which sells children illegally.
22
Colette Burggraeve, a married woman, is found in a furniture warehouse. She was raped and had oysters and champagne for dinner. Her best friend Marleen admits she and Colette were secret prostitutes. They ate with a client in a restaurant but he got too drunk. Colette drove away with a man named Lafère. Lafère acknowledges to have had sex with Collette but that was in a hotel room. After the date, she stepped into a car. Her son Benny, a student in laws renting an expensive loft, becomes a suspect.
23
Vic, the husband of Matti, had to go to the party of his boss Wim and his wife Yolande. There Vic caught Yolande together with Leo Machiels in a compromising situation but they have not seen him. When Wim vanishes, Vic is certain this is a disturbing disappearance and informs Matti. Next day, the body of Wim is found in a burned car. A drifter claims to know more but does not want to tell anything more.
24
Andre Malotte, a private detective and former policeman who got suspended, informs the BOB about a robbery. The BOB sets up a trap and the robbers are caught whilst they flee away. A firefight starts in which one of the robbers and a passant are hit. The second robber can get away. Lamotte seems to be involved as he is being contacted by some person with the request to sell the robbed jewelleries. Lamotte also informs the BOB about this call, hoping to get a reward and reparation.
25
Katrien Paulus is caught with an alcoholic beverage in school by her teacher Hilde De Bondt thus she gets yet another detention on Wednesday afternoon. It then turns out Katrien would rather have such detentions than going home. After her father Luc is murdered, Katrien claims he had a fight with his business partner Martin. Martin and Luc were cellmates. After their release they started up a company in pest killing.
26
A suspect, being assisted by lawyer Piron, is released from accusations as John Nauwelaerts made a procedural error. Next day an employee of Prion is killed. The examination is done by the team of John. They find out a lot of love affairs are going on in Pirons' company.
27
Eddy Vosberg is found hanged. Although it looks like suicide at first sight, it must have been murdered as the bin of which he jumped was not high enough. Eddy frequently got money from his father-in-law Areel to pay off his gambling debts. Those payments also lead to the bankruptcy of Aureels' company. Another direct result was that Aureels' other son-in-law could buy the business at a very cheap price.
28
The team of John is about to roll up a drug cartel, but the mission fails as Willy urgently had to pee. He hereby discovers the body of a 53 year woman born in 1945. According post-mortem examination she was shot with a gun from the Second World War. Her name is Agnes Jagenau. She uses the surname of her mother and her biological father is unknown. Most probably she is the child of some American soldier who was in Brussels. The murder leads to Dieter Van Hoeck, a connoisseur of Second World War. He claims Agnes her father is a German soldier and Agnes had a turbulent love life.
29
Urbain Van Overbeke, a vet, works as inspector for food security. Recently he disapproved the cattle of Ronnie Ceulemans as the animals had too much Clenbutrol in their body. The drug was injected by Frank Leuridan, another vet, who claims it is a medicine and no illegal drug. It is a public secret Van Overbeke starts up smear campaigns to everyone who consults Leuridan. As revenge, Ronnie poisons the horses of Urbain with bay leaf. Sometime later body parts are found in the canal.
30
continuation of previous episode The body parts belong to Urbain Van Overbeke. According post-mortem examination he suffered a heart attack, but there is no track of the root cause. Leuridan does not have an alibi what he did after he poisoned the horses. Leuridan has an affair with some married woman whose husband is a drunk. When the man is arrested, he injects some fluid into Tibo's arteries. Tibo suffers a nearly heart attack. This means the same fluid was injected in the body of Urbain Van Overbeke and the killer may have targeted the wrong person.

=== Season 4 (1999) ===
No.
31
Jan Stockmans stole 70 million Belgian Francs and had made fake identity cards for himself, his wife Viviane and son Dennis. He has the intention to move to Rio. His wife rejects to go with him. The BOB discovers what happened and arrests Viviane to set up a trap for Jan. Dennis is given shelter at an aunt. Jan is inventive and abducts Dennis. This decision has tragic consequences.
32
The body of Joyce Delfosse is found at the parking lot of a disco. She was stabbed. As she is a junk, it is assumed drug dealer Alain Coocks is the murderer. Alain claims the owner of the disco is involved: Joyce was a riot and even bit the employees. The local police is also a suspect: officers Patrick Bruneel and Jos Tanghe forged an alcohol check when Joyce was driving the car of her friend Robbie Hermans earlier that evening.
33
A terrorist wants to commit an attack in the parliament in Brussels but is killed in time by the BOB. The case is classified until Matti gets a call of the mother of the terrorist. According her politic Marc Brabants and senator Jacques Van de Kerkhove are involved in a conspiracy. Her son was not involved in the foiled attack at all but was framed by some Belgian politics as he had some burdensome information about Marc and Jacques.
34
Vivi De Keyser, a top model at Laurent Lanschot, is murdered with a nylon stocking. According her colleague Vincent Glenisson, Bessie Luyten was her competitor inside the company. Most probably she is involved in the murder so as Michael De Roeck. Willy once had a relationship with Vincent so he now has to out himself in public as being gay, something Matti already suspected.
35
Tanja De Roover, a student in communications, had an affair with her professor Rummens. He promised her to give her the questions of her exam in advance, but changed his mind. That's why Tanja did not study at all. During the exam, which happens to be oral, the professor is assisted by Dirk Lauwerijs thus he cannot commit fraud. The result is that Tanja fails. Next night her body is found in a mud pool and it looks she died due to an asthmatic attack. The professor does not have an alibi and Tanja's mother seems to blackmail him. Steven Onsia, an ex-boyfriend and class member of Tanja, neither studied as Tanja promised him to give the questions. That's why he also failed the exam.
36
Fernand Calliauw is head of a thievery gang that steals cars to sell them abroad. One of his companions is drug addict Axel Blijweert. During a transport Axel hits a boy. Axel runs away leaving the stolen BMW near the body and thus commits a hit-and-run. He seeks his father for help, but he does not believe his son and thinks he only is out for money to buy drugs. Arnold Bakelant, the father of the victim, does not want to work with the BOB as John Nauwelaerts once arrested him. Arnold takes the right in own hands and wants to find the wrongdoer. Not much later Axel is found electrocuted.
37
Jose Matthijs is found murdered by her chiropractor Dirk Van Gelderen. She is naked and her body is covered with a dress which is too small. The investigation leads to some telemarketing company and more specific Donald Blomme. Donald claims he never called Jose. The murder is linked with some ritual serial killer as some weeks earlier another murder took place in which the body was covered with a dress. It turns out the dress found at Jose's house is property of the other murder victim and vice versa. As Donald seems to be a role model and there is no proof at all a trap is set up in which Matti is the bait. Blomme turns out to be the serial killer and Matti is rescued just in time from a strangling.
38
The very rich René Rasenberg was murdered with a hunting rifle. Main suspects are his son Antoine who has gambling debts, his daughter Corinne who jeers everyone and his girlfriend Rita who is thought to be a fortune seeker. Even his father is a suspect. Both frequently go hunting and he is the last person who saw René alive. It is said René was to go to the notary to change his will, but never turned up over there.
39
Joke Prinsen and Bernadette Vaerewijck frequently visit a youth pub and both have feelings for bartender Kurt Van Kampenhout. One evening only the three of them are in the pub. Kurt insists to play a "dangerous game" in which Bernadette puts a raiser on the table. Next day, Joke goes to the police and claims Kurt beat her up. Kurt is arrested but released as he got a confirmed alibi and there are no other proofs. Ulrich, the brother of Joke, threads to kill Kurt. When Kurt is indeed killed, Ulrich is the main suspect. It turns out the mother of Joke once had a relationship with Kurt. Joke and Bernadette become suspects as revenge could be their motive. At the end, Joke and Bernadette must commit Kurt did not do anything wrong and Joke was beaten up by someone else. Most probably, Kurt was killed only due to some lies.
40
continuation of previous episode The murder weapon used to kill Kurt is an indian machette. It belongs to David De Preter, a local singer. David confirms he only found a dead Kurt together with the murder weapon which was stolen from his house. He pleads not guilty and tells he did not inform the police as he would then become the main suspect. Jeroen Pauwel, another bartender, breaks in the pub to steal a secret agenda of Kurt. In the agenda, a lot of notes are written in some secret language. The notes are about all kind of dark facts about the town inhabitants. With this information, Kurt could blackmail those people. One of the stories in the agenda is about a girl that once lived in the family of Bernadette. She died after her wrists were cut over with a raiser. The case was closed as being a suicide. The BOB know thinks it was no suicide but a murder.
