= Evelien Bosmans =

Belgian actress

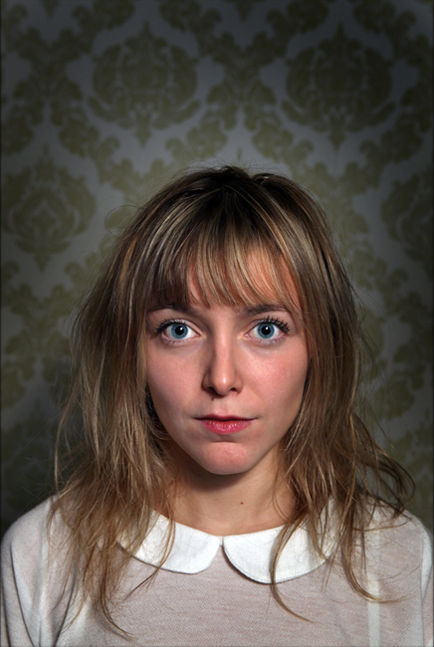
- Born: 9 November 1989 (age 36); Mol, Belgium
- Occupation: Actress
- Years active: 2010-present

Evelien Bosmans (born 9 November 1989) is a Belgian actress. She appeared in more than twenty films since 2010.

== Selected filmography ==
Year	Title	Role	Notes
2011	Groenten uit Balen		
2013	Marina	Helena	
2014	Cub	Jasmijn	
2014	Halfweg	Julie	
2014	Onno de Onwetende	Nana	
2015	Ay! Ay! Ramon	Tikkelotje	
2015	Wat mannen willen	Nicki	
