= Bert André =

Dutch actor (1941–2008)

- Born: Hubertus Antonius Gerardus Maria André; August 6, 1941; Maastricht, Netherlands
- Died: May 21, 2008 (aged 66); Antwerp, Belgium
- Occupation: Actor
- Years active: 1967–2008
- Spouse: Mieke Verheyden
- Children: Sandrine André

Hubertus Antonius Gerardus Maria "Bert" André (August 6, 1941 – May 21, 2008) was a Dutch actor who started his career in theater and later became known to the greater audiences through his roles in various movies and TV series.

== Biography ==
He started his career as a teacher in Maastricht but moved to Antwerp in 1964, where he studied theater improvisation in what later was known as the Studio Herman Teirlinck. Among his course mates were Jan Decleir and Mike Verdrengh.

One of the first big screen roles was his portrayal of the neighbour Neuteboom in the first and third film about the Flodder (1986) family which resulted in consequent movies and TV series. Some of his other more recognizable work include Ramona and Halleluja!, Mira, Turks Fruit, Soldier of Orange, De Leeuw van Vlaanderen and Boerenpsalm. In the course of his career he performed in more than 150 films between 1967 and 2008.

André has played roles in classical theater pieces written by such playwrights as Shakespeare, Harold Pinter, Chekhov and Samuel Beckett. Although mostly playing supporting roles, he has also taken some leading roles in plays like the farmer in Het gezin van Paemel by Cyriel Buysse.

He was known for his rather cautious diction and soft timbre which later on presented him with the monologues in De Kontrabass by Patrick Süskind.

He played as an actor in such theaters as Antwerp KNS, Groot Limburgs Toneel, the International Nieuwe Scène, Arca and eventually at the Brussels City Theatre.

=== Personal life ===
André was married to the Flemish actress Mieke Verheyden and has a daughter Sandrine who is also an actress.

== Death ==
André died at the age of 66 of an intracranial hemorrhage in the hospital of Antwerp where he had resided for some time due to leukemia.

== Filmography ==
Film
Year	Title	Role	Notes
1971	Mira		
1972	Louisa, een woord van liefde		
1972	La pente douce	Ouvrier agricole	
1973	Turkish Delight	Functionaris in Limburg	
1976	The Arrival of Joachim Stiller	Assistant lijkenhuisdirekteur	
1977	Doctor Vlimmen	Gedubde stem van de smid	Voice, Uncredited
1977	Soldier of Orange	Gekke Dirk	
1978	Het verloren paradijs	Jan Boel	
1978	In kluis	Wachter	
1978	Hedda Gabler	Eljert Lövborg	
1979	Woman Between Wolf and Dog	Slager	
1979	Slachtvee	Inspekteur	
1981	Come-Back!	Pater	
1982	Het Beest	Onderzoeksrechter	
1982	Tijd om gelukkig te zijn	Vertegenwoordiger	
1982	De Potloodmoorden	Vertommen	
1983	Winter 1960	Le marinier	
1983	Benvenuta	Le garçon de café	
1985	De Leeuw van Vlaanderen	Eremiet (I)	
1985	De vulgaire geschiedenis van Charelke Dop	Gille	
1986	Flodder	Neighbour Neuteboom	
1986	Les roses de Matmata	Monsieur Simon	
1987	Skin	Sergeant	
1989	Boerenpsalm		
1989	Rituelen	monseigneur	
1990	My Blue Heaven	Mr. Koopmans	
1990-2007	F.C.De Kampioenen	Broeder abt / Sergeant De Bock	2 episodes
1992	Boys	Mr. Nellens	
1992	Flodders in America	Neighbour Neuteboom	
1993	De laatste vriend		
1995	The Flying Dutchman	Cackpot	
1995	Flodder 3	Neighbour Neuteboom	
1996	De Zeemeerman	Ambtenaar Stoffels	
1999	Kaas	dokter Laarmans	
2001	Stille waters	Antoine de Bethune	1 episode
2001-2007	Wittekerke	Advocaat Désiré Geirnaert	12 episodes
2003	Verder dan de maan	Aad Schiller	
2004	The Dark Diamond	Oud Mannetje	
2004	10 jaar leuven kort		
2005	Too Fat Too Furious	Dr. Van Isacker	
2005-2008	Halleluja!	Sint-Pieter	14 episodes, (final appearance)
2006	Crusade in Jeans	Town Alderman	
2007	Moordwijven	Funeral Director	

== Theater (selection) ==
- De noces (2005)
- Spaans stuk (2005)
- Eerste liefde (2001)
- Wachtend op Godot (2000)
- Othello (1997)
- Geschiedenis van een paard (1989)
- De kontrabas (1988)
- Droom van een zomernacht (1984)
- De Minerva (1981)
- De Vreemdelingen (1977)
- De Magistraat of De klucht der Notabelen (The Magistrate) (1970)
- Hebben (1966)
