= Cub (film) =

- English language film poster
- Directed by: Jonas Govaerts
- Written by: Jonas Govaerts; Roel Mondelaers
- Produced by: Peter De Maegd
- Starring: Stef Aerts; Evelien Bosmans; Titus De Voogdt
- Cinematography: Nicolas Karakatsanis
- Edited by: Maarten Janssens
- Music by: Steve Moore
- Production company: Potemkino
- Distributed by: Kinepolis (Belgium); Kinology
- Release dates: September 10, 2014 (TIFF); October 19, 2014 (Belgium)
- Running time: 84 minutes
- Country: Belgium
- Language: Dutch

Cub (original title: Welp) is a 2014 Belgian horror film and the feature film directorial debut of Jonas Govaerts. Funds for Cub were partially raised through an IndieGoGo campaign and the film had its world premiere on 10 September 2014 at the Toronto International Film Festival. Filming took place during 2013 and stars Maurice Luijten as Sam, a young boy who goes on a camping trip with his fellow Cub Scouts, only to fall afoul of a bloodthirsty poacher.

== Story ==
Sam (Maurice Luijten) is a twelve-year-old Cub Scout who is frequently bullied by fellow Scouts and pack leader Peter (Stef Aerts). Fellow pack leader Kris (Titus De Voodgt) and chef Jasmijn (Evelien Bosmans) try to keep Peter and the others from dominating Sam, but are not always successful. When some of the pack's bullying causes them to lose their way in the mountains during a trip, Peter and Kris try to keep things light by telling the campers a campfire story about Kai, a werewolf thought to be living in that very forest. Soon after, Sam runs into a feral boy (Gill Eeckelaert) that he believes to be the actual Kai. He tries to tell the others, but is ridiculed for actually believing in the stories and even Kris chalks it up to Sam's overactive imagination. However what they are unaware of is that Kai is the son of a nameless poacher (Jan Hammenecker), who has liberally seeded the forest with various elaborate and deadly traps. Rather than caring that the campers would get caught in the traps, the father and son delight in the idea and soon the campers find themselves running for their lives.

== Cast ==
- Stef Aerts as Peter
- Evelien Bosmans as Jasmijn
- Titus De Voogdt as Kris
- Maurice Luijten as Sam
- Gill Eeckelaert as Kai
- Jan Hammenecker as Stroper/Poacher

== Reception ==
Critical reception for Cub has been mixed, and the Belgian motion picture rating board received some criticism for giving the movie an "all ages" rating. The Scouts en Gidsen Vlaanderen, the Flemish Boy Scouts organization, issued a statement where they condemned the "all ages" rating and cautioned parents to not allow their children to view the film. The film's producers also expressed surprise at the rating and stated that they would not recommend Cub be viewed by anyone under the age of 14.

English language reviewers have written predominantly positive reviews for Cub, and Dread Central and Bloody Disgusting both praised it for its characters while stating that the film did have some weaknesses in its later half. Variety gave a mostly positive review, commenting that they would have liked to have seen more character building for the characters of the poacher, his son, and Sam but that Karakatsanis’ overall filming technique was impressive.

=== Awards ===
- Best Director at the Sitges Film Festival (2014, won)
