= Moscou, Ghent =

Neighbourhood of the city of Ghent, Belgium

Moscou
- Neighbourhood of Ghent
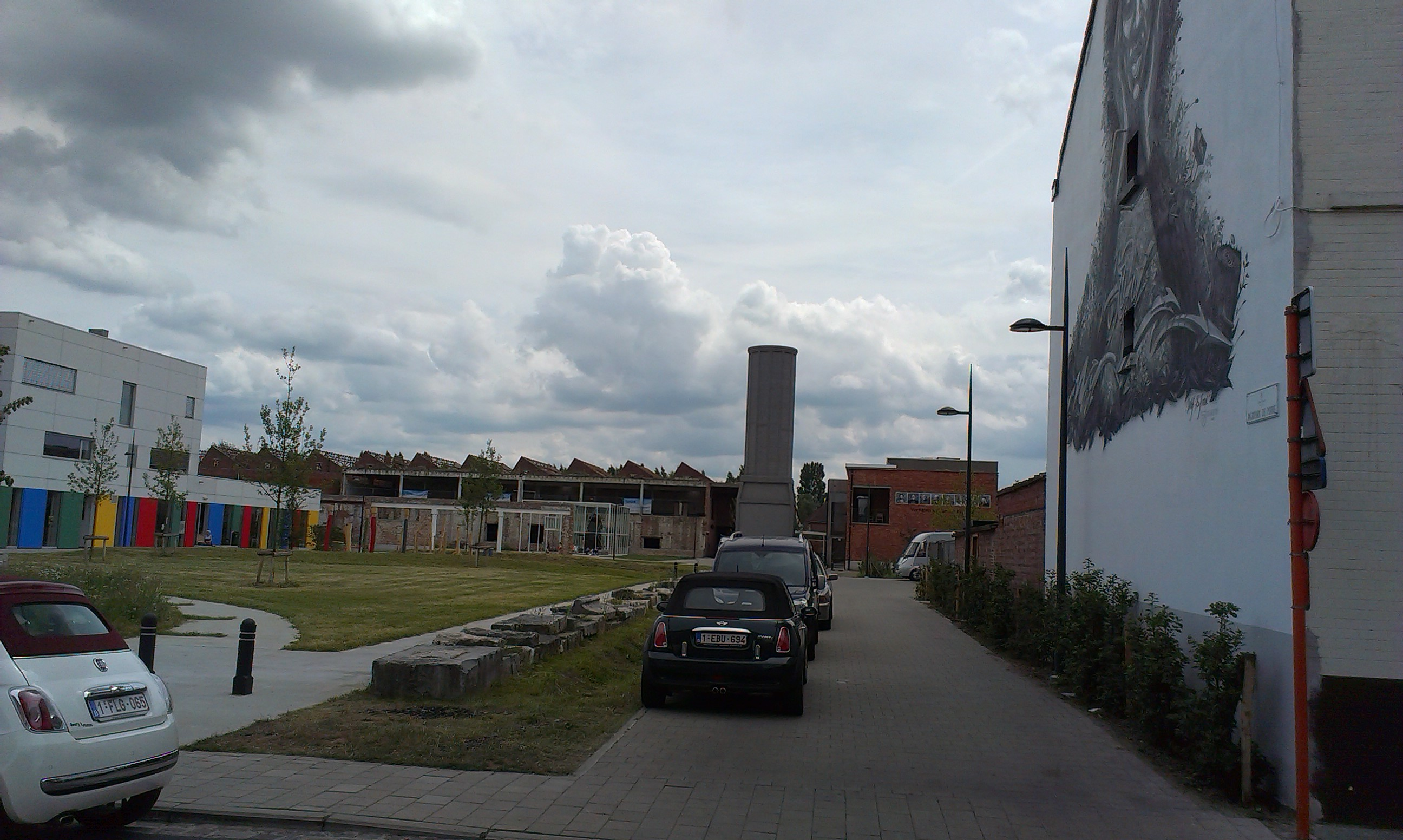
- De Porre Park
- Interactive map of Moscou
- Location within Belgium Location within East Flanders
- Coordinates: 51°01′44″N 3°45′29″E
- Country: Belgium
- Community: Flemish Community
- Region: Flemish Region
- Province: East Flanders
- Arrondissement: Ghent
- Municipality: Ghent

Population (2004)
  - Total: 4,747
- Postal codes: 9050
- Area codes: 09

Moscou (Dutch pronunciation: [ˈmɔskʌu]) is a densely populated neighbourhood of the Belgian city of Ghent, which owes its peculiar name to the presence of the Russian army in 1814-1815.

== History ==
On February 2, 1814, the French city administration of Ghent loyal to Napoleon Bonaparte fled the town before the approaching Russian army. On February 4, the Russian army, including Cossacks but also some Prussian hussars commanded by colonel Novosinovits-Menshikov (who took up residence on the Ghent Kouter) entered the town as liberators.

Local enthusiasm turned into concern as 200-300 Russian troops camping just outside Ghent in the fields of Ledeberg (close to present-day Moscou) engaged in plundering from the local peasants. A town delegation went to Brussels to obtain the departure of the Cossacks on February 7, leaving only Prussians in charge of Ghent.

As French troops continued to resist the Coalition forces, on March 14, the 1st regiment of Don Cossacks, 250 men, commanded by the 80-year-old Colonel Bishalov (soon to be dubbed "Peetje Kozak" or "Grandpa Cossack" by the Ghent population) arrived in Ghent. Bishalov resided at the Kouter, but, because of their reputation, the soldiers were not welcome to settle anywhere within city walls and endlessly moved around before, on February 18, they left for the north to defeat a French army unit at Sas van Gent. After this battle, the entire Russian force left for Deinze in the south but Bishalov's Cossacks returned on March 9, again to defend the town against the resisting French. The Cossacks were now housed in tents and granaries in the fields of Ledeberg and Gentbrugge. On March 24, the Cossacks celebrated Emperor Alexander I's accession day, by organizing, amongst other things, a cavalcade in the centre of Ghent, turning the Kouter into a manege.

On March 26, after a fierce battle with French troops, Bishalov retreated to Melle, but four days later his troops fought their way back. As French resistance in western Flanders faltered, on April 2, Bishalov finally left Ghent for Mons. Well into the twentieth century, however, Ghent parents would frighten their children into obedience by threatening to get Grandpa Cossack to punish them for any mischief.

When on June 29, Russian Emperor Alexander I visited Ghent, he was only greeted by Prussian troops. A detachment of the Russian army is again reported in the Veldwijk of Gentbrugge during Napoleon Bonaparte's Hundred Days in 1815.

During the 19th and 20th century, Ledeberg and Moscou gradually became part of Ghent city, first turning into residential suburbs and later into working-class housing areas.

Moscou was also marked by the construction of a railway junction (serving the Ghent railway lines to Brussels and Antwerp) and of a freight station, both on the border of Gentbrugge and Merelbeke. There was a growing need for public transport to provide easy connections with the centre of Ghent. Tram lines between both ends of Moscou and the South Station neighbourhood of Ghent have been operating since the beginning of the 20th century. In 1913, during the Ghent World Exhibition, the trams of one of these lines was famously drawn by camels.

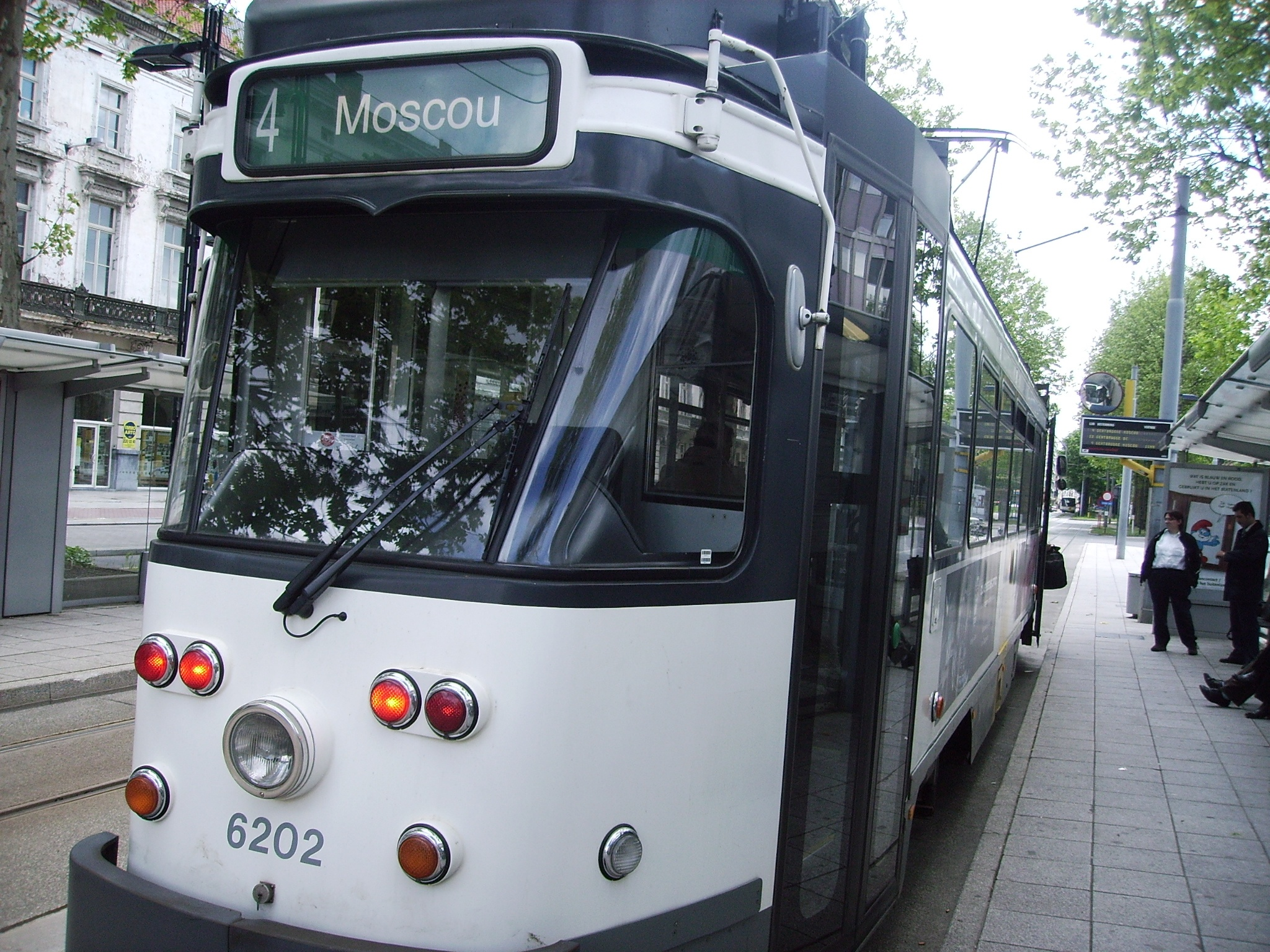
Tram 4 on its way to Moscou

The tram line between Ghent's main railway station, Sint-Pieters, and the south end of Moscou (now line 4) to which Moscou owed most of its notoriety outside Ghent, started operating in 1931.

Notwithstanding its population growth, Moscou was never an independent town or village, and with the rest of Gentbrugge became a part of Ghent in 1977. Since this merger of communes, which erased the border between Ledeberg and Gentbrugge, the borders of Moscou have become a little fluid. The Ghent city administration restricts Moscou (merged with the smaller neighbourhood of Vogelhoek) to what used to be part of Gentbrugge, near Merelbeke railway station, but local inhabitants often incorporate adjacent parts of Ledeberg, like the Papeleu park with its Russian-style apartment block Most of the action in the 2008 Flemish film Moscow, Belgium, which put Moscou on the international map, also takes place in Ledeberg.

== Population statistics ==
In 2004 Moscou had 4,747 inhabitants, a 0.8% decrease in comparison with 1997 (during the same period, the population of Ghent increased by 2.8% to 230,723 inhabitants). Moscou's population includes few people of non-Belgian origin (5.4% versus 13.1% in the whole of Ghent) but a rather high proportion of older people (in the 45-64 age bracket).
