= Moscow, Belgium =

2008 Belgian film

- Aanrijding in Moscou
- Directed by: Christophe van Rompaey
- Story by: Jean-Claude van Rijckeghem, Pat van Beirs
- Produced by: Jean-Claude van Rijckeghem
- Starring: Barbara Sarafian; Jurgen Delnaet; Johan Heldenbergh
- Distributed by: Kinepolis Film Distribution
- Release date: 2008
- Country: Belgium
- Language: Dutch

Moscow, Belgium (Dutch: Aanrijding in Moscou, literally Collision in Moscou) is a 2008 Belgian film directed by Christophe Van Rompaey and written by Jean-Claude Van Rijckeghem and Pat van Beirs.

Moscou is the name of a neighbourhood in Gentbrugge, in the Flemish city of Ghent.

== Plot ==
Mathilda or "Matty" (Barbara Sarafian) is a bitter 41-year-old postal worker in Ghent, Belgium. She finds herself drifting through life, waiting for her husband Werner (Johan Heldenbergh) to decide if he wants to leave his current 22-year-old lover Gail and return to Matty and their three kids.

One day after shopping at the supermarket, Matty backs into a yellow highway tractor in the parking lot. The owner of the truck is 29-year-old Johnny (Jurgen Delnaet). They have an explosive argument over whose fault it is. Johnny rips into Matty and tries to put her in her place, but Matty gets the best of him and earns his respect. The police show up and they file a report. Johnny memorizes Matty's number from the police report and pursues her. He calls several times and one day shows up at her apartment, offering to fix the trunk of her car. At first she acts as though she's annoyed, but she secretly feels amused. After he fixes her car, she invites him to join her family for dinner. They have a good time and after dinner he proposes they go out for a drink. Unwillingly, Matty accepts, assuming it will be harmless. However, during the date, he relentlessly tries to persuade her to spend the night with him. She eventually gives in and they became lovers

The night they share together rejuvenates her. When Werner learns about Matty's affair with Johnny, he asks a friend at the police station to run a background check. They find out that he did time for an incident wherein he brutally attacked his wife and put her in the hospital for two weeks. One night at dinner, Matty's teenage daughter Vera asks Johnny if the charges are true and he shamefacedly says yes. Disgusted, Vera leaves the table and Matty tries to break things off with Johnny, but he explains that he had had too much to drink that night and after his ex-wife admitted she had been having an affair for three months, he went into a rage. Matty tries to resist his charm but can't, and things continue as though nothing has happened.

Jealous that he might lose Matty, Werner tries to get her back. The three end up having dinner together. Johnny and Werner have an argument at the table, and both leave while Matty hides out in the laundry room. She realizes that Werner is the one making her unhappy and makes the decision to try having a relationship with Johnny. While they are out celebrating her decision, Johnny and Matty run into Johnny's yuppie ex-wife and her lawyer lover. At this point, Johnny is sloshed, having had a few too many drinks. All four end up in a heated argument, and Johnny ends up throwing a beer keg at the lawyer's car, shattering the windshield. Matty is disgusted at Johnny's lack of restraint and leaves. She tries to rekindle her romance with Werner, but there's no passion. A while later, Vera invites Matty to a karaoke bar, where they run into Johnny. He tries to serenade her, but she becomes disgusted again and leaves. She later goes back to try to find him before he departs for Italy.

== Cast ==
- Barbara Sarafian as Matty
- Jurgen Delnaet as Johnny
- Johan Heldenbergh as Werner
- Anemone Valcke as Vera
- Sofia Ferri as Fien
- Julian Borsani as Peter
- Bob De Moor as Jacques
- Jits Van Belle as Nicky
- Griet van Damme as Nathalie
- Camille Friant as Iris

== Awards and nominations ==
Year	Group	Award	Winner/Nominee	Result
2008	Cannes Film Festival	ACID Award		Won
2008	Cannes Film Festival	Grand Golden Rail		Won
2008	Cannes Film Festival	Critics Week Grand Prize		Won
2008	Cannes Film Festival	Golden Camera	Christophe Van Rompaey	Nominated
2008	Cannes Film Festival	SACD Award	Jean-Claude Van Rijckeghem, Pat van Beirs	Won
2008	Denver International Film Festival	Krzysztof Kieślowski Award for Best Feature Film		Won
2008	European Film Awards	Best European Composer	Tuur Florizoone	Won
2008	Zurich Film Festival	New Talent Award	Christophe Van Rompaey	Won
2008	Zurich Film Festival	Best Debut	Christophe Van Rompaey	Won
2008	São Paulo International Film Festival	Best Feature Film		Nominated
2008	World Soundtrack Awards	Discovery of the Year	Tuur Florizoone	Nominated
2008	World Soundtrack Awards	Public Choice Award	Tuur Florizoone	Won
2008	Listapad	Best Actress	Barbara Sarafian	Won
2009	Palić European Film Festival	FIPRESCI Prize - Best Film		Won
2009	Palić European Film Festival	Best Actress	Barbara Sarafian	Won
2009	CPH PIX	Politiken's Audience Award	Christophe Van Rompaey	Nominated
2009	Bermuda International Film Festival	Best Narrative Feature	Christophe Van Rompaey	Won
2009	Fantasporto	Directors' Week Award-Best Film		Won
2009	Media Wave International Film Festival	Jury Award - Best Actress	Barbara Sarafian	Won
2009	Media Wave International Film Festival	Youth Grand Prize - Best Film		Won
