= Barbara Sarafian =

Belgian actress

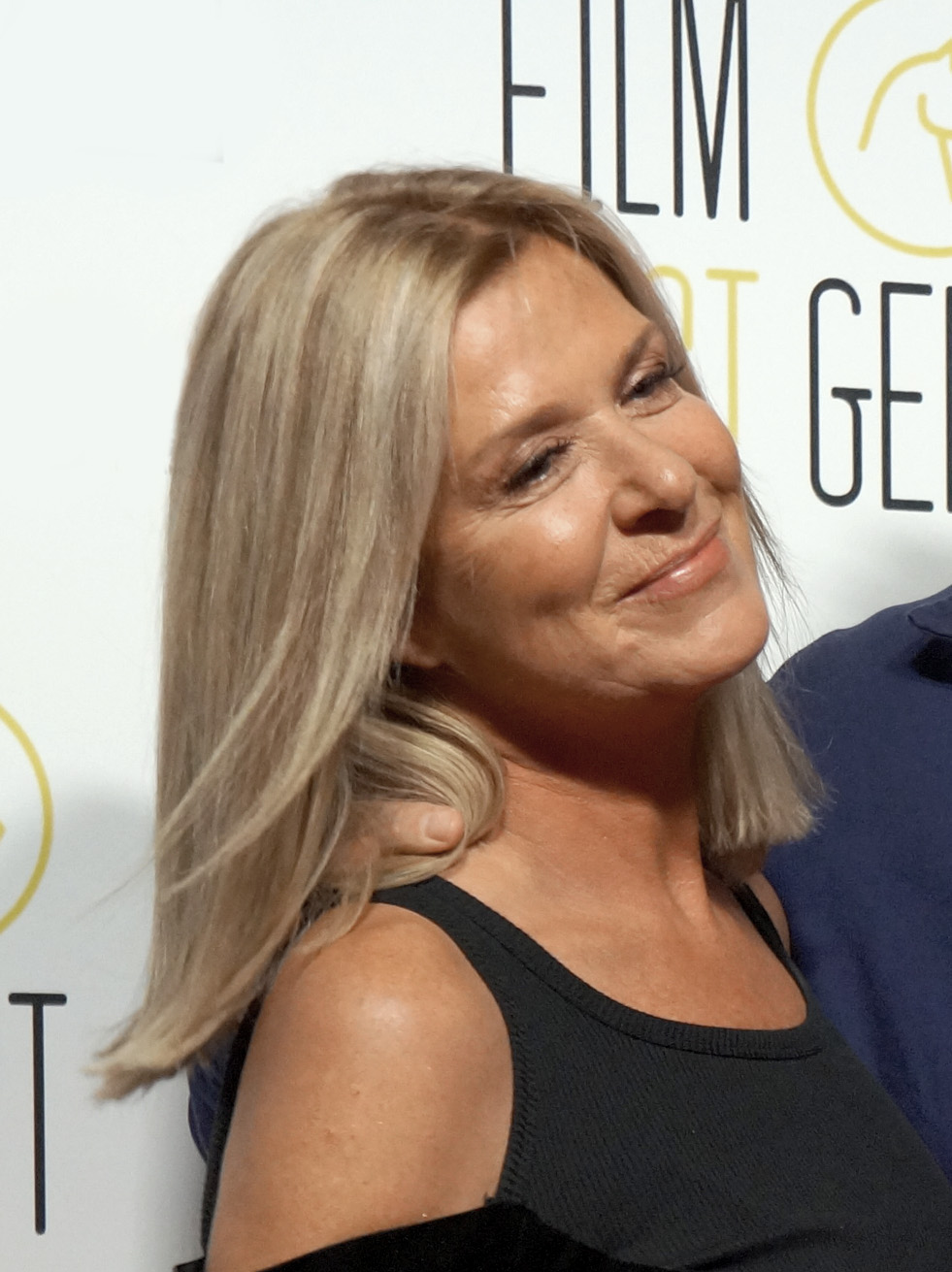
- Barbara Sarafian at Film Fest Ghent in 2019
- Born: 16 April 1968 (age 56); Ghent, Belgium
- Occupation: Actress
- Years active: 1994–

Barbara Sarafian (born 16 April 1968) is a Belgian actress.

She began her career in radio programmes, including Sonja Duplex from Studio Brussel and De Nieuwe Wereld (The New World) from Radio 1. In Flanders, her television debut in the much-repeated series Alles Kan Beter (Everything Can Be Better, 1998) often places her in a comic context.

She made her international debut in Peter Greenaway's 8½ Women (1999). She also appeared in Fortress 2 (2000) and in Roman Coppola's CQ (2001). She received a Best Actress award for her role as Matty in the film Collision in Moscow. In 2015 she won a Flemish Television Star for "Best actress" for her performance in the series In Vlaamse velden (In Flemish fields). She was awarded the Boccalino d'Oro for Best Actress at the Locarno Festival in 2016.

In 2016 she was the face of the campaign Hey hoe gaat het? (Hey how are you?) which tries to break the taboo around suicide.

== Filmography ==
Television (as herself)
Year	Title
1998	Alles Kan Beter
1999	nl:Blinde Vinken (literally "Blind Finches") dinner-table current affairs series
2000	nl:Mannen van de macht ("Men of power"), comedy series
2009	nl:Villa Vanthilt, live talk show series hosted by Marcel Vanthilt
2010	nl:De klas van Frieda, quiz show
2013	nl:Heylen en de Herkomst ("Heylen and the Heritage"), genealogy show hosted by Martin Heylen
2018	nl:De Slimste Mens ter Wereld ("The smartest person in the world"), celebrity quiz show
2020	nl:Veel Tamtam, game show

Filmography (as actress)
Year	Title	Role
1994	nl:Pasta!	Sanne
1995	nl:The Way To Dusty Death	Goodyear girl
1999	Fortress 2	Hart
1999	8½ Women	Clothilde
2001	CQ	
2001	The Point Men	Journalist
2003	nl:Het kleine dove Wonder	Mother
2004	nl:Ellektra	
2008	Collision in Moscow	Matty
2009	nl:SM-rechter	TV presenter
2009	The Over the Hill Band	Pascale
2010	Sint	Mother of Frank
2010	nl:Marieke Marieke	Jeanne
2010	nl:Zot van A.	Lydia Leekens
2011	Bullhead	Eva Forrestier
2011	Isabelle	Gislene
2012	Allez, Eddy	Angel
2012	Hemel	Brechtje
2012	nl:Brasserie Romantiek	Roos
2013	nl:Emmenez-moi	Tania
2014	nl:Billy the bully	Mother
2016	Vincent	Marianne
2016	nl:Everybody Happy	Laura Mares
2018	Baba Yega: The Movie	Cordelia Zen
2019	All of Us	Therapist Els
2020	Superette Anna	Mother of Guy
Television
2000	Spike	
2002	nl:Kijk eens op de doos ("Look at the box", satirical series	
2003	nl:Sedes & Belli, detective series	Inge Wyffels
2007	Aspe, detective series	Margot Vanderlint
2008	Vermist, crime drama	Mother
2008	Kinotipp (German series)	
2009	nl:Wij van België, comedy	Laurence de Tromond d'Arbanville
2009	Witse	Christina Houtteman
2010–2011	Dubbelleven	Karen Van Dyck
2010-2015	Tegen de Sterren op, comedy sketch series	various roles
2011	nl:Kiekens, sitcom	Myriam Opdebeeck
2011	Zone Stad	Psychiatrist Inge Daems
2012	Aspe, detective series	Indira Brouwers
2012	Clan	Eva Goethals
2013	Zone Stad	Psychiatrist Inge Daems
2013	nl:Funnymals, comedy	voice-over
2013	nl:Ontspoord	Daisy Vanderweghen
2014	nl:In Vlaamse velden	Virginie Boesman
2014	nl:Achter de feiten, comedy sketch series	various roles
2015	nl:Vossenstreken, police procedural hased on New Tricks	Sarah
2016, 2018	Professor T, comedy sketch series	Helena Gijselbrecht
2016	Wat als?, comedy sketch series	various roles
2017	Beau Séjour	Melanie Engelenhof
2018	nl:Gevoel voor tumor, tragi-comedy	Esther Schoonjans
2019	Baptiste	Martha Horchner
2020	nl:Niets Te Melden	Carine
2021	Déjà Vu	Helena
2021	nl:The Window (televisieserie)	Marion Glass DI
2021	nl:Glad IJs (televisieserie)	Suzy
2021	nl:Grond (televisieserie)	Marilou
2024	Mr. K	
Theatre
2009	nl:Uniroyal	
2014	nl:Alles van Eva (All about Eve)	
2015	Closer	
2016	nl:Le Grand Troupeau	

== Personal life ==
Barbara Sarafian is of Armenian and Belgian heritage.
