= All of Us (film) =

- Theatrical release poster
- Directed by: Willem Wallyn
- Starring: Maaike Neuville; Barbara Sarafian; Joke Devynck; Wim Opbrouck
- Release date: 11 October 2019 (IFFG)
- Running time: 112 minutes
- Country: Belgium
- Language: Dutch

All of Us is a 2019 Belgian drama film directed by Willem Wallyn. Maaike Neuville won the best actress award for her performance as Cathy at the 2021 Oostend film festival.

== Cast ==
- Maaike Neuville as Cathy
- Barbara Sarafian as Els
- Joke Devynck as Elisabeth
- Wim Opbrouck as Cédric
- Bruno Vanden Broecke as Philippe
