= Yummy (film) =

2019 Belgian comedy horror film

- Film poster
- Directed by: Lars Damoiseaux
- Written by: Lars Damoiseaux; Eveline Hagenbeek
- Produced by: Kobe Van Steenberghe; Hendrik Verthé
- Starring: Maaike Neuville; Bart Hollanders; Benjamin Ramon; Clara Cleymans
- Cinematography: Daan Nieuwenhuijs
- Edited by: Pieter Smet
- Music by: Nico Renson
- Production company: A Team Productions
- Release dates: December 13, 2019 (Bobbejaanland); December 18, 2019 (Belgium)
- Running time: 88 minutes
- Country: Belgium
- Languages: Dutch; English

Yummy is a 2019 Belgian comedy horror film directed by Lars Damoiseaux while co-written by Damoiseaux and Eveline Hagenbeek. Starring Maaike Neuville, Bart Hollanders, Benjamin Ramon and Clara Cleymans, Yummy is the first Belgian zombie film. It tells a story of a zombie outbreak that occurs after a Belgian couple and her mum that goes to a hospital in the Eastern Europe to have plastic surgery.

Damoiseaux and Hagenbeek has started to work on the script of the movie in November 2010, and the principal photography was begun in November 2018. It was premiered on December 13, 2019, in Bobbejaanland. The film was released on December 18, 2019, in Belgium.

== Synopsis ==
The film primarily follows Alison and her boyfriend Michael, who have traveled to Eastern Europe so that she and her mother Sylvia can receive cosmetic surgery from an elite plastic surgeon, Dr. K. When Michael expresses misgivings about the facility's lax atmosphere, Michael is given a tour by a staff member, Daniel, who abandons Michael partway through in order to steal some drugs. Michael discovers a restrained, muzzled woman and removes the muzzle just as Daniel returns. They discover that the woman is a zombie, causing them to flee. The woman chews through her restraints and leaves to attack others, causing a zombie outbreak. Michael makes his way to Alison and stops her surgery so they can flee. On their way to Sylvia, they are attacked by a zombie and Alison leaves Michael behind, believing him to be dead. Alison finds an unconscious Sylvia and while trying to wheel her to safety, a zombie appears and bites Sylvia. Daniel arrives and saves them.

Michael awakens and makes his way through the facility, discovering Dr. K and his administrator Janja before reuniting with Alison, Sylvia, Daniel, and another survivor. Dr. K reveals that the facility accidentally created the zombie virus during the course of some experiments. He is then killed by Janja before he can reveal more, justifying his death by saying that he was infected by Sylvia, who had begun changing. Michael is urged to kill Sylvia but when he cannot, a disgusted Alison does it instead. The remaining survivors try to escape the facility, with some dying in the process. Daniel becomes infected while trying to blackmail Janja, who he then kills as revenge, telling the others that a zombie did it. The group discovers that the military has blocked off almost all ways out of the facility and is willing to kill any who try to leave to prevent the virus spreading. Daniel, Alison, and Michael make it to an unprotected manhole, however Daniel betrays Michael by leaving him in the facility tunnels. Alison and Daniel make it to a car, where he is killed by Alison after she discovered his infection and because he tried to rape her. Michael makes it out of the tunnels by using a bomb, in the process accidentally providing an exit route for some zombies. His escape is ultimately for naught, as he is fatally run over by Alison, who believes him to be another zombie. She realizes her mistake just as she crashes her car and dies as the movie ends.

== Cast ==
- Maaike Neuville - Alison
- Bart Hollanders - Michael
- Benjamin Ramon - Daniel
- Clara Cleymans - Janja
- Annick Christiaens - Sylvia
- Eric Godon - Dr. K.
- Joshua Rubin - Yonah
- Taeke Nicolaï - Oksana
- Tom Audenaert - William
- Noureddine Farihi - Kuisman

== Reception ==
Yummy holds a rating of 69% on Rotten Tomatoes, based on 16 reviews.
