= Groenten uit Balen (film) =

- Film poster
- Directed by: Frank van Mechelen
- Starring: Stany Crets; Evelien Bosmans
- Release date: 14 December 2011
- Running time: 100 minutes
- Country: Belgium
- Language: Dutch

Groenten uit Balen (lit. 'Vegetables from Balen') is a 2011 Belgian drama film adaption of the book eponymous play by Walter van den Broeck. The overall story is based upon real events.

== Synopsis ==
Family Debruyker lives in Balen in a rather poor neighborhood with outdated houses. Father Jan works at Vieille Montagne. When the workers find out that their colleagues at the sites in Hoboken and Liège earn 10 Belgian franc more per hour for similar work, they start a strike which takes nine weeks. Due to said strike they have no income at all. Jef Sleeckx, at that time only a local politician and member of the town council of Mol, convinces banks and landlords to temporarily suspend loans and rents. Local grocery stores give the strikers food for free and charities are set up. Meanwhile daughter Germaine is sure the local environment is poisoned with zinc and lead from the factories and that this is the cause of some health issues of the local population nearby. Germaine becomes pregnant with Luc's child but he ends the relationship. Germaine loses her job at the GB in Mol after she is caught stealing a box of chewing gum. Mother Clara visits Luc's wealthy parents with the intention that they must provide financial support for raising Luc and Germaine's child, but she is bribed with expensive chocolates and other niceties. Grandfather is against the strike as the workers should be happy to have a job and must undergo all decisions made by the board. In the end, the board of directors concedes and promises better conditions and pay than initially demanded.

== Cast ==
- Stany Crets as Jan Debruycker
- Evelien Bosmans as Germaine Debruycker
- Tiny Bertels as Clara Debruycker
- Michel van Dousselaere as Opa Debruycker
- Clara Cleymans as Alice
- Herwig Ilegems as Rik
- Bart Hollanders as Luc Verheyen
- Veerle Dobbelaere as Mevrouw Verheyen
- Koen De Bouw as Mijnheer Verheyen
- Lucas Van den Eynde as Piet Populiers
- Axel Daeseleire as Marcel
