= 8½ Women =

8 1/2 Women
- Theatrical release poster
- Directed by: Peter Greenaway
- Written by: Peter Greenaway
- Produced by: Kees Kasander
- Starring: John Standing; Matthew Delamere; Vivian Wu; Shizuka Inoh; Barbara Sarafian; Kirina Mano; Manna Fujiwara; Toni Collette; Amanda Plummer; Natacha Amal; Polly Walker
- Cinematography: Reinier van Brummelen; Sacha Vierny
- Edited by: Elmer Leupen
- Music by: Frank Loesser; Giuseppe Verdi
- Production company: Movie Masters
- Distributed by: Pathé Distribution (United Kingdom); United International Pictures (Benelux); absolut MEDIEN (Germany)
- Release dates: 22 May 1999 (Cannes); 10 December 1999 (United Kingdom); 6 January 2000 (Netherlands); 26 May 2000 (United States)
- Running time: 118 minutes
- Countries: United Kingdom; Netherlands; Luxembourg; Germany
- Languages: English; Italian; Japanese; Latin
- Box office: $424,123

8 1/2 Women is a 1999 comedy-drama film written and directed by Peter Greenaway and starring John Standing, Matthew Delamere, and Vivian Wu. An international co-production of the United Kingdom, the Netherlands, Luxembourg, and Germany, it was entered into the 1999 Cannes Film Festival.

== Plot ==
After the death of his wife Amelia, wealthy businessman Philip Emmenthal and his son Storey open their own private harem in their family residence in Geneva. They get the idea while watching Federico Fellini's 8 1/2 and after Storey is "given" a woman, Simato, to waive her pachinko debts. They sign one-year contracts with eight (and a half) women to this effect.

The women each have a gimmick (one is a nun, another a kabuki performer, etc.). Philip soon becomes dominated by his favorite of the concubines, Palmira, who has no interest in Storey as a lover, despite what their contract might stipulate. Philip dies, the concubines' contracts expire, and Storey is left alone with Giulietta (the titular "1/2" as an amputee) and of course the money and the houses.

=== Note ===
While the film deals with and graphically describes diverse sexual acts in conversation, the film does not feature any sex scenes as such, though it does contain several instances of male and female nudity.

== Cast ==
- John Standing as Philip Emmenthal
- Matthew Delamere as Storey Emmenthal
- Vivian Wu as Kita
- Shizuka Inoh as Simato
- Toni Collette as Griselda / Sister Concordia
- Amanda Plummer as Beryl
- Natacha Amal as Giaconda
- Barbara Sarafian as Clothilde
- Kirina Mano as Mio
- Manna Fujiwara as Giulietta/Half Woman
- Polly Walker as Palmira
- Elizabeth Berrington as Celeste
- Myriam Muller as Marianne
- Don Warrington as Simon
- Claire Johnston as Amelia
- Dean Harrington as American business man

== Production ==
Toni Collette said Peter Greenaway chose her by accident for the role of Griselda. "I went in for another part and I had just had my head shaved and I had a Buddha hanging around my neck. Afterwards I thought, 'This is going to teach me to go to an audition looking like that'."

== Reception ==
=== Box office ===
The film opened at the box office at #50 with $92,000 and grossed $424,123 domestically.

=== Critical response ===
8 1/2 Women received mixed reviews. On the review aggregator website Rotten Tomatoes, 42% of 38 critics' reviews are positive, with an average rating of 5.1/10. The website's consensus reads: "Peter Greenaway's exploration of sexual exploitation exhibits his fondness for breaking taboos, but this seedy exercise's ideas never come together into a satisfying whole." Metacritic, which uses a weighted average, assigned the film a score of 36 out of 100, based on 25 critics, indicating "generally unfavorable" reviews.

In a rather positive review, Roger Ebert commented "Now how is this funny? Trying to imagine other kinds of comedies handling the material, I ran it through Monty Python, Steve Martin and Woody Allen before realizing it has its roots in Buster Keaton--whose favorite comic ploy was to overcome obstacles by applying pure logic and ignoring social conventions or taboos. Keaton would have tilted it more toward laughs, to be sure; Greenaway's humor always seems dour, and masks (not very well) a lot of hostility. But, yes, Keaton."
