= De Kreuners =

Flemish rock band

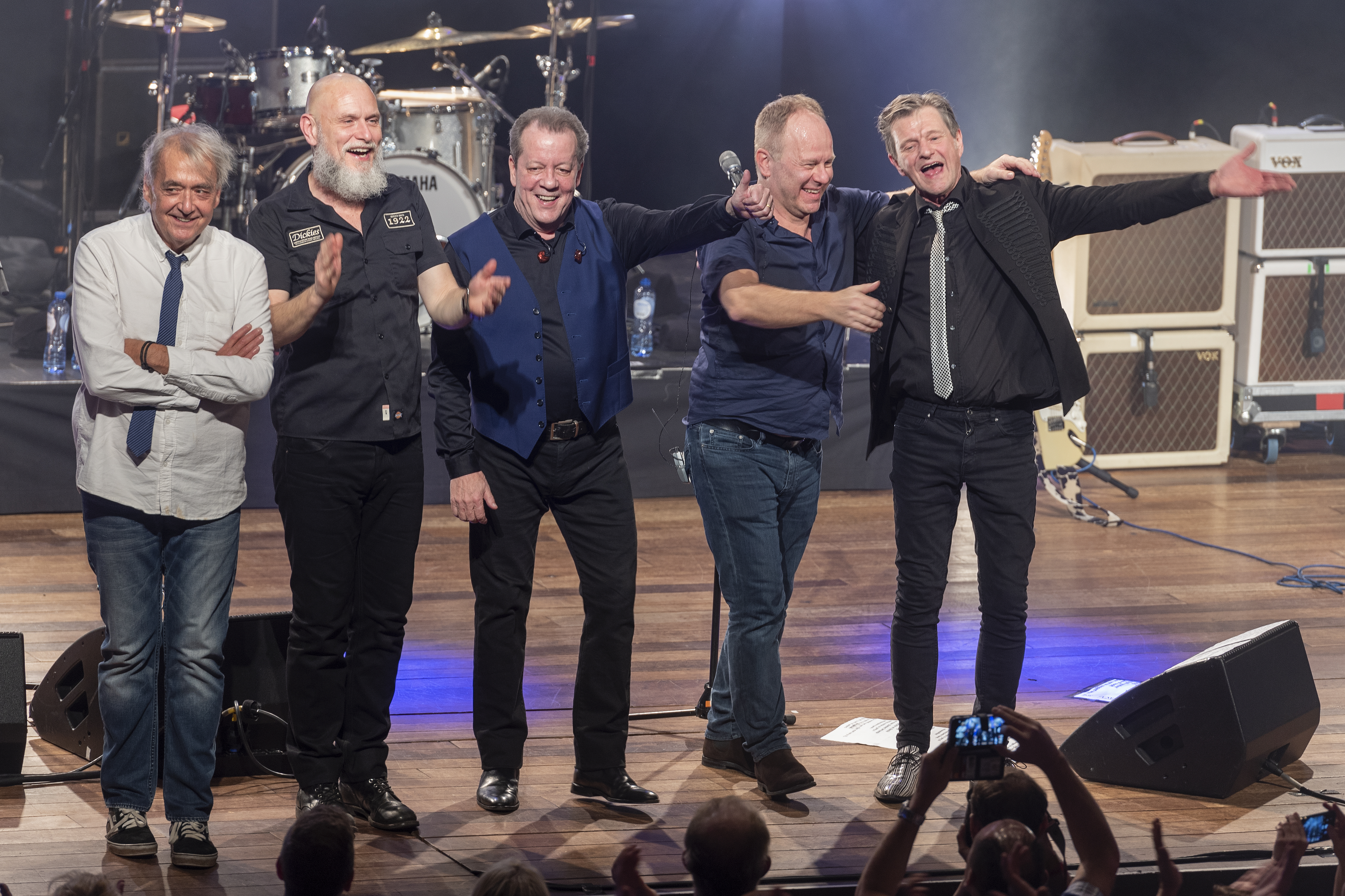
- De Kreuners in 2019

Background information
- Origin: Lier, Belgium
- Genres: Rock music
- Years active: 1978–2012, 2017–present
- Labels: Mercury, EMI
- Members: Walter Grootaers; Erik Wauters; Jan Van Eyken; Axl Peleman; Ben Crabbé

De Kreuners are a Flemish rock band established in 1978. They first received interest when they won the first Humo's Rock Rally in 1978, but didn't get a record contract. They self released their first three singles. They recorded their first single Nummer een in London. It became their first success. After these three singles, they signed with Warner Bros. and released in 1981 's Nachts kouder dan buiten. It sold 30,000 copies. By the time of their second album, 1982's Er sterft een beer in de taiga, they were one of Flanders' most successful bands, and the record became gold in two days time. In 1990 they switched to EMI and released their biggest success, the 1990 album Hier en nu, which sold 100,000 copies. The single Ik Wil Je has sold over 1 million copies (separate and on full CDs and compilations). Their best of Het beste van de Kreuners is already certified platina before its release date.

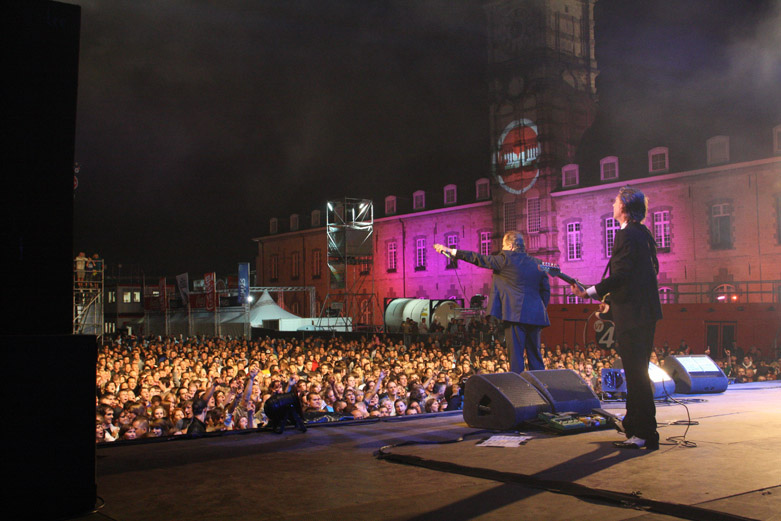
Casa blanca festival 2010

On 13 February 2012 the band announced officially the end of their career, which they rounded off with two concerts in Belgium.

In 2017, the band announced their comeback, followed by a tour in Belgium and the Netherlands.

The current line-up consists of:

- Walter Grootaers: lead vocals
- Erik Wauters: guitar
- Jan Van Eyken: guitar
- Axl Peleman: bass-guitar
- Ben Crabbé: percussion

Axl Peleman is the replacement of Berre Bergen, who left the band in 2007.

== Discography ==
- 1981 's Nachts kouder dan buiten
- 1982 Er sterft een beer in de taiga
- 1983 Natuurlijk zijn er geen Alpen in de Pyreneeën
- 1984 Weekends in België (live album)
- 1986 Dans der onschuld
- 1990 Hier en nu
- 1991 Het beste van De Kreuners
- 1992 Knagend vuur
- 1995 De Kreuners
- 1998 Pure Pop
- 2000 / 2003 Originele hits / Essential
- 2003 1978
- 2003 25 jaar het beste van De Kreuners
- 2005 DVD - Live 2005
- 2008 30 Jaar de Kreuners (3CD box)
- 2012 De Laatste Kreun / Best of 3 CD
- 2012 Live in Zwortegem
- 2018 De Singles

Singles

Title	Year
Nummer een	1980
Nee oh nee	1981
Zij heeft stijl	1981
Gezellig samenzijn	1981
Madame WuWu	1981
Layla	1982
Beest	1982
Cous cous kreten	1982
Doe het gevecht	1983
Vuil water	1984
Ik dans wel met mezelf	1985
Sha la	1985
Jongens hebben geluk	1986
Wij gaan deserteren	1986
A rum a drum drum	1987
Koes koes kreten	1989
Verliefd op Chris Lomme	1989
Ik wil je	1990
Nu of nooit	1990
Zo jong	1990
Maak we wakker	1991
Layla	1991
Het regent meer dan vroeger	1991
In de zin van mijn leven	1991
Help me door de nacht	1991
Ik ben bij jou	1991
De hemel nooit beloofd	1991
Vergeet het maar	1995
Er komt een tijd	1996
Wat komen moet dat komt	1996
Vader moeder appelspijs	1996
We kleuren de nacht	1998
De laatsten zullen de eersten zijn	1998
Waar en wanneer	1998
Meisje Meisje	2003
Ja!	2003
Lust slaapt nooit	2004
Pinguïns in Texas	2008
Stil in mij	2008
Das wat ik zeggen wou	2010
Radio	2012
Viktoria	2017
Ik Wil Je ft. Joost Klein	2020
