= Joke Devynck =

Belgian actress

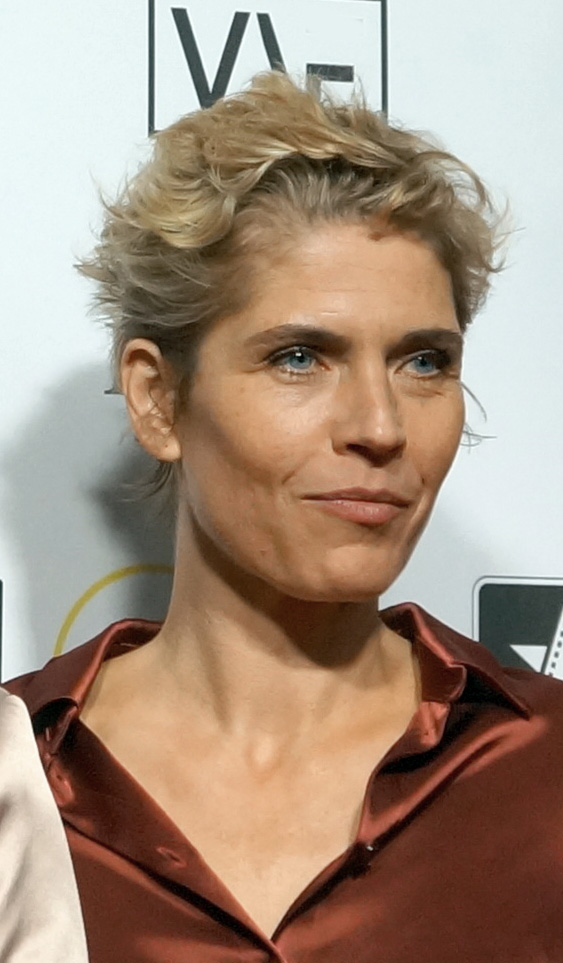
- Born: 10 October 1972 (age 53); Poperinge, Belgium
- Occupation: Actress
- Years active: 1994-present

Joke Devynck (born 10 October 1972) is a Belgian actress. She appeared in more than thirty films since 1994.

== Personal life ==
For 19 years she lived together with the Flemish actor Johan Heldenbergh in Hofstade in Aalst, Belgium. On 17 September 2013 it became public that the two actors separated. They have three children; two are twins.

In the 2010 Belgian federal election Devynck was a candidate for the Groen party.

== Selected filmography ==
Film
Year	Title	Role	Notes
2005	Gilles		
2010	Zot van A.		
2013	The Verdict		
2019	All of Us	Elisabeth	

TV
Year	Title	Role	Notes
2007-2008	Sara	Esther Bossiers	
