= Natacha Amal =

Belgian actress (born 1963)

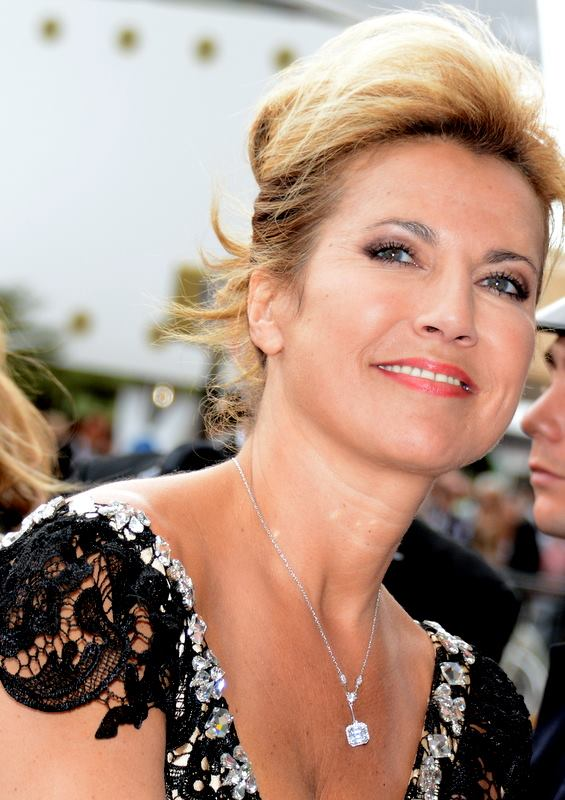
- Amal (2014)
- Born: 4 September 1968 (age 57); Brussels, Belgium
- Occupation: Actress
- Years active: 1987-present
- Spouses: Claude Rappe (m. 1997; div. 2007); Jacques Stival (m. 2015)

Natacha Amal (born 4 September 1968) is a Belgian actress.

== Personal life ==
Amal was born on 4 September 1968 to a Moroccan father and a Russian mother in Brussels, Belgium. She was married to Claude Rappe in 1997, but the couple divorced in 2007. In 2015, she got married with Jacques Stival. In 2019, Gala magazine reported that Amal and Stival were divorcing.

== Theater ==
Year	Title	Author	Director	Notes
1987	Le Garçon d'appartement	Gérard Lauzier	Christian Salez	
1988	Friday, or, The Other Island	Michel Tournier	Albert-André Lheureux	
1988	Monsieur de Pourceaugnac	Molière	André Debaar	Théâtre Royal du Parc
1989	The Marriage of Figaro	Pierre Beaumarchais	Daniel Leveugle	
1989	Le Fidèle	Pierre de Larivey	Jean-Marie Villégier	Théâtre national de Chaillot
1990	A Midsummer Night's Dream	William Shakespeare	Jérôme Savary	Festival d'Avignon
1991	Phèdre	Jean Racine	Jean-Marie Villégier (2)	Théâtre d'Évreux
1994	Tartuffe	Molière	Daniel Leveugle (2)	
1996	Sophonisbe	Pierre Corneille	Jean-Marie Villégier (3)	Théâtre de l'Athénée
1997	Bagatelle(s)	Noël Coward	Pierre Mondy	Théâtre de Paris
2001	Coupable ou non coupable	Ayn Rand	Robert Hossein	Théâtre Marigny
2002	No Exit	Jean-Paul Sartre	Robert Hossein (2)	Théâtre Marigny
2004	Un beau salaud	Pierre Chesnot	Jean-Luc Moreau	Théâtre de Paris
2006	Andromaque	Jean Racine	Thomas Le Douarec	
2009	Panique au ministère	Jean Franco & Guillaume Mélanie	Raymond Acquaviva	Théâtre de la Porte Saint-Martin
2010	Milady	Éric-Emmanuel Schmitt	Pascal Racan	
2012	The Diary of a Chambermaid	Octave Mirbeau	Jonathan Duverger	
2013	L'Amiral	Bernard Granger	Xavier Lemaire	
2015	Ma Mère est un panda	Willy Liechty	Didier Brengarth	

== Filmography ==
Year	Title	Role	Director	Notes
1989	Pentimento	The Washroom Attendant	Tonie Marshall	
1989	Morte fontaine	Nathalie Stern	Marco Pico	TV movie
1991	Les clés du paradis	Charlotte	Philippe de Broca	
1991	Navarro	Camille Banon	Gérard Marx	TV series (1 episode)
1993	Le nombril du monde	Marie	Ariel Zeitoun	
1993	Dracula mon amour	The Woman	Serge Abi-Yaghi	Short
1993	Nestor Burma	Marianne	Claude Grinberg	TV series (1 episode)
1993-2006	Commissaire Moulin	Samantha Beaumont	Several	TV series (22 episodes)
1995	Dans la cour des grands	Eva	Florence Strauss	
1995	Julie Lescaut	Catherine Winjisky	Élisabeth Rappeneau	TV series (1 episode)
1996	Les chiens ne font pas des chats	Judith	Ariel Zeitoun (2)	TV movie
1997	Une femme très très très amoureuse	Isabelle	Ariel Zeitoun (3)	
1998	Le bal masqué	Sophie d'Arfeuille	Julien Vrebos	
1998	Frères et flics	Emilia	Bruno Gantillon	TV series (2 episodes)
1999	8½ Women	Giaconda	Peter Greenaway	
1999	Gialloparma	Margot	Alberto Bevilacqua	
1999	Voyous voyelles	Sandrine	Serge Meynard	
1999	Mai con i quadri		Mario Caiano	TV movie
1999	Mission protection rapprochée	Hélène	Gérard Marx (2)	TV series (1 episode)
2000	Le prof	BCBG Teacher	Alexandre Jardin	
2000	Réglement de contes		Jeremy Banster	Short
2000	Vertiges	Isabelle Miller	Olivier Chavarot	TV series (1 episode)
2000-09	Femmes de loi	Élisabeth Brochène	Several	TV series (44 episodes)
2001	Vertiges	Alexandra Cartier	Laurent Carcélès	TV series (1 episode)
2002	Napoléon	Madame Bertrand	Yves Simoneau	TV mini-series
2003	Le Bleu de l'océan	Jeanne	Didier Albert	TV mini-series
2004	Ariane Ferry	Laura Cortez	Gérard Cuq	TV series (1 episode)
2005	Mes deux maris	Christine	Henri Helman	TV movie
2005	Un beau salaud	Barbara	Eric Civanyan	TV movie
2005	Le juge	Judith	Vincenzo Marano	TV mini-series
2006	Premier suspect	Claire Sagamore	Christian Bonnet	TV movie
2009	Panique au ministère	Gabrielle	Arnaud Emery	TV movie
2010	Un bébé pour mes 40 ans	Béatrice	Pierre Joassin	TV movie
2013	Nos chers voisins	Catherine	Emmanuel Rigaut	TV series (1 episode)
