= Clan (TV series) =

Flemish television series

- Also known as: The Out-Laws
- Genre: Black comedy Drama
- Created by: Malin-Sarah Gozin
- Written by: Malin-Sarah Gozin; Bert Van Dael
- Directed by: Kaat Beels; Nathalie Basteyns
- Starring: Barbara Sarafian; Kristine Van Pellicom; Ruth Becquart; Maaike Neuville; Inge Paulussen; Dirk Roofthooft; Geert Van Rampelberg; Robbie Cleiren
- Opening theme: "Oh Little Darling" by Paul Severs
- Country of origin: Belgium
- Original language: Dutch
- No. of episodes: 10

Production
- Producers: Frank Van Passel; Ivy Vanhaecke

Original release
- Network: VTM
- Release: September 3 – November 5, 2012

Related
- Bad Sisters

Clan (aired as The Out-Laws in the United Kingdom and Australia) is a Belgian miniseries created by Malin-Sarah Gozin and directed by Kaat Beels and Nathalie Basteyns. The show aired during fall of 2012 on the Belgian channel VTM, after six months of filming from August 2011 until January 2012. An Irish remake under the title Bad Sisters was released in 2022 on Apple TV+.

== Story ==
The early death of their parents caused five sisters to have a close relationship (a clan). Their relationship is torn apart after one of the sisters, Goedele, marries the despicable Jean-Claude (aptly called "De Kloot"—The Prick, “kloot” means “bollock”). Gradually, the four sisters see Goedele transform into a submissive housewife, living in the shadow of her loathsome husband. Each of the four sisters has a reason to detest "De Kloot". This eventually drives them to plotting his death, but their plans don't always work out the way they expected. Eventually, he dies but two insurance agents are convinced that his death wasn't an accident and are desperate to find out how he died.

Episode 1
The burial of "De Kloot" takes place in the first episode. The following episodes work with flashbacks and flashforwards, ranging between the end of October 2012 (the burial of "De Kloot") and the preceding months, unraveling the mystery of his death.

Episode 2
The first sisters to come up with a plan are Eva and Birgit. Veerle and Rebekka, the other two sisters, are excluded from their plot. "De Kloot" is planning to go to his chalet in the Ardennes alone, which they see an excellent opportunity to get rid of him. While he's in bed, they sneak in the chalet, cut the gas tank and light a candle. When they're waiting for the cabin to explode, they hear him talking on the phone outside. Just when they realise he went outside because of the lack of telephone signal inside, the empty chalet explodes.

Episode 3
After involving Veerle with their plans, Birgit comes up with the idea to poison the liver on the monthly Liver day, when "De Kloot" eats liver. Before he could even start his meal, the poisoned liver was devoured by his dog Oscar, which led to the dog's death.

Episode 4
Bekka, the youngest sister, joins the club and proposes death by electrocution. Before his weekly bath, Birgit sneaks into the house and opens the window ajar. Minutes later, when The Prick is in bath, Eva kicks a football against the window, causing it to slam open and drag the plugged-in radio that was standing in front of the window into the tub. The four cheer as the radio causes a local power failure, while all lights in the neighbourhood go out. Moments later, they realize that he had stepped out of the tub to kick the meowing cat out of the house, avoiding his electrocution. On top of that, an old man a few houses away fell from the stairs, because the lights had gone off.

Episode 5
Birgit, a former crossbow champion, comes up with a plan to shoot "De Kloot" during the family trip to a paintball area. After experimenting with a watermelon, the four realize that frozen paintballs are the equivalent of bullets. Veerle, who works as a nurse at the local hospital, knows that "De Kloot" has a scar on his head, under which there's no skull. The ideal bull's eye. After mixing up the wrong protection masks at the paintball area, she ends up aiming at the wrong guy and shooting a frozen paintball into the unfortunate man's eye.

Episode 6
Suspension. The sisters mix Rohypnol in "De Kloot"'s nose spray, sedating him. They drag him to the garage and put his head through a noose, hanging him. However, his feet break the infra-red rays, causing the garage door to open. His neighbour sees him hanging while gardening, and quickly cuts the rope and calls the ambulance.

Episode 7
They leave the work to a professional. They find a hitman who shadows "De Kloot", and hire a private investigator to draw attention away from the hitman. Unfortunately, there's a mix-up of "De Kloot"'s information files with the ones of the detective, and thus the detective ends up in dog food, instead of the brother-in-law.

Episode 8
Rebekka finds out that "De Kloot" keeps his dead father in the freezer in the basement of his mother's (Hermin) house. He refreshes the ice once a month, which seems like the perfect kill: freeze him to death. Rebekka often goes to Hermin's house and the two get along very well. Rebekka puts the widow in bed just before "De Kloot" shows up with the ice. She hides in the basement, so that she can block the door of the freezer once he's inside. She hears footsteps, the opening of the freezer and thus she quickly blocks the door and bails. If only Hermin had stayed in bed, instead of checking on her frozen husband, she wouldn't have ended up trapped in the freezer. Yet again, "De Kloot" is still alive and kicking.

Episode 9
Goedele and her husband go to a new chalet in the Ardennes to celebrate her birthday. Veerle ended up collecting strychnine in the hospital where she works, a poison that acts quickly and leaves no traces. The four head to the chalet, but stay in a hotel, before leaving the day after to surprise their sister. Arriving at the chalet, they find a squad of policemen there to investigate the chalet. Amidst the squad stands a sobbing Goedele, who reveals "De Kloot" died that night. The plan succeeded, but none of the four sisters claims to have anything to do with his death.

Episode 10
Veerle, Rebekka, Eva and Birgit cannot give each other alibis for the night of his death. This causes them to end up in a fight. But they're not the only ones who are eager for his death. During the previous episodes, "De Kloot" was shown to have many sour relationships with a lot of people (among those people even the Chinese mafia). After a while, the sisters still don't know who killed him, and the lack of trust between them doesn't help their research either. However, after a week it is revealed that it was his very own wife, who killed him by strangulation.

After the two had dinner the evening prior to his death, Goedele wanted to make love. Her husband abruptly refused and drunkenly revealed that he once raped Eva, impregnating her. He mixed up his pills with hers, causing a miscarriage and thus ruining her whole life in the field of pregnancy (she became infertile) and employment (it caused her to have psychiatric problems). Upon hearing this, Goedele angrily takes a blanket and wraps it around his neck. She then takes the quad-bike and drives his body into the forest. After putting the motorcycle against a tree, and wrapping a scarf she just knitted around his neck and into the spokes of the wheel, she turns on the ignition and opens full throttle: In episode seven we learned Goedele was fascinated by a film about Isadora Duncan.

However, the two insurance agents have figured everything out and decide to confront the sisters. Mathias, one of the two insurance agents, visits Rebekka and they have a talk. The two, who are actually dating, try to find a way to solve the situation. Because of Rebekka's and Mathias' (not so) secret relationship, her sisters told her to poison him, fearing she's going to ruin the whole plan. Ultimately, Rebekka kicks the glass of poisoned Cola out of his hands, because she can't poison the one guy she loves. Mathias then reveals he's liable for fraud, since the insurance claim of "De Kloot" wasn't constructed correctly. If they went to the police to show all the evidence, the police would also find out what happened with the insurance claim, and thus both families would end up in jail. Mathias finally decides to not pay out the life insurance and to burn all the evidence that would lead to the sisters' downfall, so that neither the sisters nor the insurance agents get into trouble.

== Cast ==
| Actor/Actress | Character | Brief description |
|---|---|---|
| Barbara Sarafian | Eva Goethals | Single, infertile, psychiatric past, oldest sister |
| Kristin Van Pellicom | Veerle Goethals | Married, three children, nurse, two-timer |
| Ruth Becquart | Birgit "Bibi" Goethals | Married, two children, former cross-bow champion, monoculous because of an accident caused by Jean-Claude, autistic |
| Maaike Neuville | Rebekka "Bekka" Goethals | Single, masseuse, youngest sister |
| Inge Paulussen | Goedele "Goele" Goethals | Married to Jean-Claude, one child |
| Dirk Roofthooft | Jean-Claude "De Kloot" Delcorps | Married to Goedele, one child, hated brother-in-law |
| Geert Van Rampelberg | Mathias Dewitt | Insurance agent, dating Rebekka Goethals |
| Robbie Cleiren | Thomas Dewitt | Insurance agent, fresh dad |

== Episodes ==
| No. | Episode (Original title) | (English title) | Original transmission date | UK transmission date |
|---|---|---|---|---|
| 1 | Bloedband | "Blood Ties" | 3 September 2012 | 15 July 2016 |
| 2 | Inferno | (shown with ep. 1) | 10 September 2012 | (as previous) |
| 3 | Leverdag | "Liver Day" | 17 September 2012 | 22 July 2016 |
| 4 | Hoogspanning | "Sparks" | 24 September 2012 | 29 July 2016 |
| 5 | Oog om oog | "An Eye for an Eye" | 1 October 2012 | 5 August 2016 |
| 6 | In de knoop | "Noose Spray" | 8 October 2012 | 12 August 2016 |
| 7 | Professionele hulp | "Professional Help" | 15 October 2012 | 19 August 2016 |
| 8 | Kareltje | "Little Chester" | 22 October 2012 | 26 August 2016 |
| 9 | Twee lijken en een laatste plan | "Two Bodies and One Last Plan" | 29 October 2012 | 2 September 2016 |
| 10 | Een sponsen pyjama (ontknoping) | "Flannel Pyjamas" | 5 November 2012 | 9 September 2016 |

== International broadcast ==
In 2015, the series aired in Germany on ZDFneo. Under the name The Out-Laws and subtitled, the series was available on demand from British broadcaster Channel 4 as part of its Walter Presents service and began to air on Channel 4's More 4 channel in July 2016. In 2017, the series also aired in Australia under that title and was available for streaming on SBS on Demand.

== Adaptation ==
In 2013, it was announced that an American remake was in development for A&E. Gozin discussed the remake in a 2016 interview with The Guardian, in which she stated, "At one point, they wanted it to be a real-crime series and turn the insurance inspectors into criminals. Another network wanted to make the sisters younger, but then you’d lose the midlife themes. But if they want to make it better, be my guest!"

In 2022, the series was adapted into an Irish version for Apple TV+, named Bad Sisters. A second season of the remake was released in 2024.
