= Martine Tanghe =

Belgian journalist (1955–2023)

- Born: 23 November 1955; Bellem, Belgium
- Died: 23 July 2023 (aged 67); Lubbeek, Belgium
- Occupations: Journalist, news anchor, television presenter
- Years active: 1978–2020

Martine Tanghe (23 November 1955 – 23 July 2023) was a Belgian journalist. She is most known as news presenter at the Flemish public broadcast channel VRT. She is widely recognised for her language proficiency, elegant pronunciation and eloquence.

== Biography ==
Tanghe studied Germanic languages in Leuven.

In 1978 she started working for VRT (then BRT). Initially she combined reporting with presenting in the studio.

From 2005 until 2015 she presented the Grand Dictation of the Dutch Language, the most notable spelling competition of the Dutch language region. From 2009 until 2017 she was in the board of directors of Onze Taal, a Dutch society dedicated to the Dutch language.

She retired at the end of 2020. Her last words on television before retirement became part of Flemish collective memory: "Ik zal u missen. Hou het veilig, hou vol, het komt allemaal weer goed."(I will miss you. Stay safe, keep going, everything's going to be alright.)

She died on 23 July 2023 in her own home, due to cancer.

== Awards ==
Tanghe is widely praised for her pronunciation and language skills.

- In 2008 she received an Honourable Mention at AIB Media Excellence Awards-award International TV personality of the year.
- In 2020 she received the Grote Prijs Jan Wauters, later renamed after her.
- In 2021 she received an Order of merit of the Flemish Community
- In 2023 she was awarded the rank of Commander in the Order of the Crown.
- She has a street named after her in Lubbeek.
