= Kris Cuppens =

Belgian actor

- Born: 22 May 1962 (age 62); Neeroeteren, Belgium
- Occupation(s): actor, writer
- Years active: 1995-present
- Awards: Taalunie Toneelschrijfprijs, 2006 -- Lied

Kris Cuppens (born 22 May 1962) is a Belgian actor and writer.

Cuppens was born in Neeroeteren and discovered theatre in secondary school. He studied architecture at university, but rediscovered his love for the theatre during an audition for Jan Fabre in Brussels. After studying acting at the royal conservatory, he left Belgium for New York, to study at the Lee Strasberg Theatre and Film Institute.

In 1995 he appeared on television in the series Heterdaad ("Caught Red Handed") in the role of police inspector Willy Martens. He met Dirk Tuypens, with whom he became involved in the peace movement and bombspotting. This collaboration led to the theatrical production Vaderland ("Fatherland"). On the set of Heterdaad he met Joachim Lafosse, with whom he made several films, among them Tribu, Ça rend heureux, and Nue Propriété.

His work is notable for drawing on his Flemish and Limburgish roots. He wrote a theatrical play, Lied ("Song") which is largely autobiographical, telling about three generations of Flemings (his grandfather, his father and himself), the war, and the coal mining strikes in Limburg. On 18 November 2006, he won the Taalunie Toneelschrijfprijs award for Lied.

Cuppens teaches about drama and theatre in Maastricht, Leuven, Antwerp and Brussels.
