= Zone Stad =

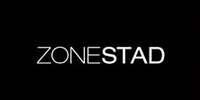
- Zone Stad
- Created by: Christian Vervaet, Stefaan Werbrouck, Jan Schuermans
- Starring: Guy Van Sande; Kim Hertogs; Katrien Vandendries; Peter Van Asbroeck; An Vanderstighelen; Werner De Smedt; Ivan Pecnik
- Country of origin: Belgium
- No. of seasons: 8
- No. of episodes: 104

Production
- Running time: 50 minutes

Original release
- Network: VTM
- Release: 2003 – 2013

Zone Stad was a popular Flemish-Belgian TV series about a police-department located in Antwerp. The show started in 2003 and ended in 2013. In the series, police officers solve various crimes, which are shown as realistically as possible. It is produced by the VMMa and broadcast on Belgian commercial channel vtm and TROS in the Netherlands.

== Cast members ==
=== Main cast ===
Actor	Character	Played	Episodes
Guy Van Sande	Tom Segers	2003–2013	1–104
Katrien Vandendries	Dani Wauters	2003–2013	1–104
Ivan Pecnik	Wim Jacobs	2003–2010, 2013	1–33, 39, 44, 51–52, 65, 92–104
Tom Van Landuyt	'Ruige' Ronny Nijs †	2003–2007, 2011	1–39, 66–78
Anne Mie Gils	An Treunen	2003–2008	1–40, 47
Rudi Delhem	Ivo Celis †	2003–2008	1–46
Jan Van Looveren	Jean Bellon	2003–2007	1–39
Robrecht De Roock †	Jean Verbeken	2003–2005	1–26
Els Trio	Gwennie Callens †	2004–2007	8–32
George Arrendell	Jimmy N'Tongo †	2007–2013	28–93
Warre Borgmans	Frederik Speltinckx	2007–2010	27–64
Peter Van Asbroeck	Mike Van Peel	2008–2013	40–104
Werner De Smedt	Lucas Neefs	2008–2013	40–104
An Vanderstighelen	Els Buyens	2008–2013	47–104
Lien Van de Kelder	Fien Bosvoorde †	2008–2012	41–91
Tine van den Brande	Kathy Vanparys †	2008–2011, 2013	40–67, 72, 95–96
Kim Hertogs	Esther Mathijs	2013	92–104

=== Recurring cast ===
Actor	Character	Played
Wim Stevens	Thierry de Groot	2003–2007, 2012
Brunhilde Verhenne	Nathalie De Jonghe	2003–2007
Hilde Uitterlinden	Ria Celis-Bogaerts †	2003–2007
Hans De Munter	Stefaan Paulussen	2007
Lut Tomsin	Jeanine Schellekens †	2008–2011
Guido De Craene	Mark Lathouwers	2010–2013
Geert Van Rampelberg	Brik Delsing	2010
Sandrine André	Inez 'Vermeulen' Alva	2011–2012
Christophe Haddad	Maxim Verbist	2011–2012
Koen De Graeve	Maarten De Ryck †	2011
Barbara Sarafian	Inge Daems †	2012–2013
Natali Broods	Veerle Goderis	2013
