= Sara (Belgian TV series) =

Belgian Telenovela

- Logo
- Created by: FremantleMedia
- Starring: Veerle Baetens; Gert Winckelmans; Kürt Rogiers; Sandrine André
- Opening theme: "Where She Belongs" – Natalia Druyts
- Country of origin: Belgium
- Original language: Dutch (Flemish)
- No. of episodes: 200

Production
- Producer: FremantleMedia
- Production locations: Antwerp, Belgium
- Running time: 25 min (approx. 22 min)

Original release
- Network: VTM
- Release: 25 September 2007 – 29 June 2008

Related
- Remake of Betty la Fea

Sara is a Flemish telenovela, based upon the Colombian telenovela Betty La Fea. It tells the story of Sara De Roose, a business economics graduate, who passed with honours at the university but has trouble finding a job—until she comes across an assistant job in a Belgian fashion company, called "Présence". The company is looking for a new general manager, and Sara's arrival coincides with the two CEOs arguing who this has to be.

The series was broadcast by the commercial station VTM, upon which it was shown every weekday at 6:25 pm. On Sundays, VTM broadcast all episodes of the past week, called 'De Week van Sara' ("Sara's week"). Sara premiered on 25 September 2007 and ended in June 2008, after 200 episodes. A new telenovela called LouisLouise (about a guy named Louis, who turns into a woman (Louise) by a spell) replaced Sara as of September 2008.

Sara begins the series as the "ugly duckling", mocked by many of her colleagues for being "ugly". As the series progresses, she develops confidence, moves up the ladder, becomes more powerful and explores romantic interests. The series also focuses on fellow Présence employees, and their relationships and career problems.

The show was written by a team of writers, led by Hugo Van Laere. He already wrote many scripts for Flemish TV series and movies, such as 16+, Rupel, and Dennis van Rita. The series was directed by Serge Bierset, Renaat Coppens, Filip Van Neyghem and Geoffrey Enthoven. The latter already directed many Flemish movies, such as The Only One and Happy Together.

== Ratings ==
Sara's first episode was a huge success, with an average of 840,000 viewers (it was broadcast in prime time at 8:35 pm). The second episode was broadcast at its regular hour, 6:25 pm. This ensured a fall in viewers of 50%, with an average of 420,000 viewers. The reason is probably a game show, called Blokken, which is very popular in its time slot and starts at the same moment as Sara.

Slowly, the ratings of Sara increased. In December 2007, Sara already had an average of 450,000 to 550,000 viewers. As of February 2008, the ratings increased again, and Sara now has an average of 650,000 to 750,000 viewers. Since then Sara became a direct competitor for Blokken. And the success continued: ratings increased even more, and when VTM moved Sara to prime time again (for the last twenty episodes), ratings doubled and surpassed a million viewers. The final episode gathered more than 1.5mln viewers.

== Cast ==
Simon (Gert Winckelmans) and Sara (Veerle Baetens) in a promo picture for Sara.

=== Main cast ===
Character	Actor/Actress
Sara De Roose	Veerle Baetens
Simon Van Wyck	Gert Winckelmans
Britt Van Hove	Sandrine André
Alexander de Lannoy	Kurt Rogiers
Helena de Lannoy	Lotte Pinoy
Hans De Roose	Ivan Pecnik
Leon Van Wyck	Hans De Munter
Margot Van Wyck	Karin Tanghe
Arne d'Hauwe	Benjamin Van Tourhout
Lieven Pauwels	Tom Van Bauwel
Marnix Standaardt	Paul Codde
Ellen De Graeve	Annemarie Lemaître
Thomas De Graeve	Anthony Arandia
Lut Laureyns	Veerle Eyckermans
An Verbiest	Laurien Van den Broeck

=== Guest actors ===
Character	Actor/Actress
Brenda	Aza Declercq
Esther	Joke Devynck
Koen	Olivier De Smet
Martine	Annick Christiaens
Nils	Pieter Van Keymeulen
Jurgen	Tom De Hoog
Steven	Maarten Claeyssens
Georges	Michel Bouwens
Michèle	Bieke Ilegems
Daniël	Kristoff Clerckx
Patrick	Dries Vanhegen
Jan	Bart Klein
Felix	Erik Burke
Sven	Ides Meire

== Awards and nominations ==
On 13 February 2008, the nominees of the Flemish TV-stars (The Flemish Emmys) were announced. Sara was nominated for three awards. Veerle Baetens, who plays Sara, and Sandrine Andre, who plays Britt, were both nominated for Best Actor or Actress, but only Veerle Baetens won. The series was nominated for Best Fiction program, but didn't win. Katarakt, another Flemish TV series, won it. The 2 Public Awards, which were announced that night, were for Sara.

Actor/Actress/Series	Award	Win/Nomination
Veerle Baetens	Best Actress	Won
Sandrine André	Best Actress	Nomination
Sara	Best Fiction Programme	Nomination
Sara	Most Popular TV Programme (Public Award)	Won
Veerle Baetens	Most Popular TV Personality (Public Award)	Won
