= Ben Crabbé =

Belgian quizmaster, talk show host, and musician

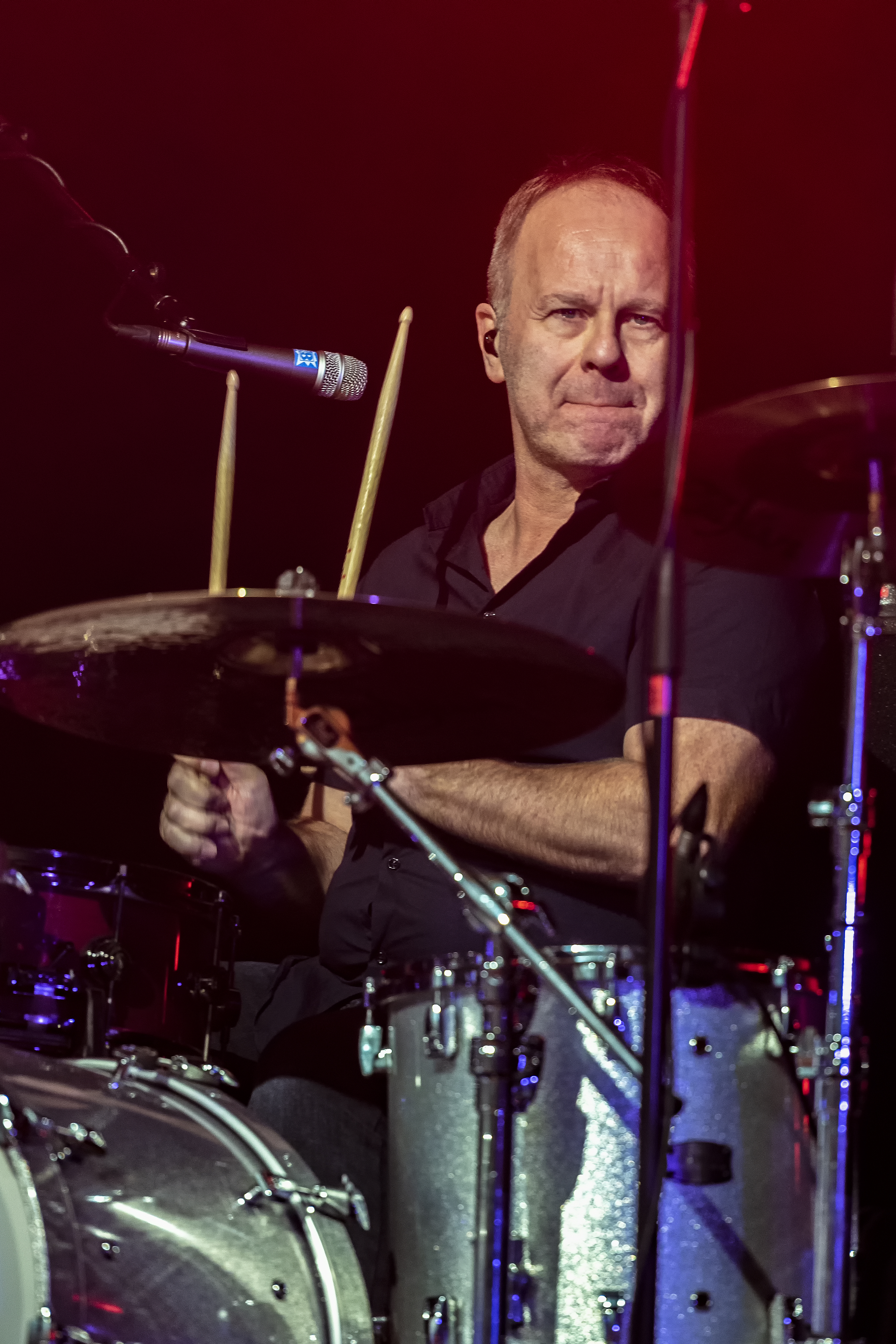

Benjamin Bert Carl (Ben) Crabbé (Tienen, 12 November 1962) is a Belgian quizmaster, talkshow host and musician. He became well known as drummer in Belgian rockband De Kreuners. He is quizmaster at Belgium's longest running quiz-show Blokken, since 5 September 1994. He was voted Belgium's Favorite TV Personality twice, in 2002 and 2005.
