= Blokken =

Belgian TV quiz show

- Created by: De Mensen
- Starring: Ben Crabbé
- Country of origin: Belgium
- Original language: Dutch
- No. of seasons: 32
- No. of episodes: 6840 (June 24th, 2026)

Production
- Producer: De Mensen
- Production location: Vilvoorde
- Running time: 30 min

Original release
- Network: VRT 1
- Release: 5 September 1994 – present

Blokken (Blocks) is a Belgian quiz show based on the video game Tetris. It is broadcast on VRT 1 and hosted by Belgian television personality Ben Crabbé.

Launched in 1994, the show aired its 5,000th episode on 10 December 2017. With more than 30 seasons, the show is the longest running quiz show on Belgian television, and the longest-running daily quiz in the world.

According to the schedule, Crabbé will step down after 33 years of hosting the quiz following the 2026-27 season. He is expected to be succeeded by Sven de Leijer from September 2027.

== Rounds ==
=== Round 1 ===
Ben asks a series of 8 (originally 10) questions. The first contestant to buzz in with the correct answer picks up 10 points and drops 2 pieces on the game board. When a line on the board is created, it is cleared, and the contestant finishing that line earns a 50-point bonus.

=== Round 2 ===
Each contestant plays separately. The contestant with the most points from the first round temporarily leaves and gets to listen to music. Meanwhile, the other contestant will play the round.

The contestant will get five hints, and may decide in what order he/she will take the questions. The number of blocks that can be placed after the question was answered correctly is the same as the order of the questions (the first question gives one block, the second question two blocks, etc.). If the contestant answers correctly, 10 points are awarded and he/she drops the pieces assigned to that question. Each line on the board earns a 50-point bonus. In theory, a maximum of 350 points is possible in this round; this was first achieved in Season 18. After the first contestant finishes the round, the other contestant is invited back for his turn. In the event that a player's pieces reach the top of the board, the round ends for that player.

==== Previous rules ====
Before Season 18, the second round worked differently. The contestant was given 15 pieces to place on the board, and five questions were asked. Before each question, the contestant had to assign some of the pieces (max. five) to that question, based on a hint given in advance. The contestant was allowed to assign zero pieces to a question.

In the first season, the second round was played in the same way as the first round, with the board being cleared between rounds. In this round, three of the 10 questions would be designated as 50-point questions; a sound effect would play and the piece on the board would turn gold to signal this event.

=== Gokronde (Guessing Round) ===
A final round of 10 questions. Before each question, the host gives a hint about the answer. The first contestant to press the buzzer is given the entire question and the chance to answer. If the answer is correct, 50 points are awarded and the contestant can put 2 pieces on the board. Each line is worth an additional 50 points. If the contestant fails to give the correct answer, 50 points are deducted from that contestant's score (negative scores are possible), and the other contestant is given a free attempt at the question (that is, the second contestant will not be charged a penalty if wrong; but only 10 points can be earned from the question itself). If neither contestant buzzes in, then the question is played on the buzzers for 10 points. At the end of this round, the contestant in the lead plays the finale. The losing contestant receives a consolation prize.

If a tie occurs at the end of the round, the host would ask one final question to both contestants. The first contestant to buzz in with a correct response automatically wins the game, but an incorrect answer results in an automatic loss.

== Finale (bonus round) ==
The contestant is given a total of 120 seconds for the round. Ben asks a series of questions. Unlike previous rounds, a correct answer is worth one piece. In this round, an eight-letter word (a seven-letter word through season 17) is hidden on the board. Before the round, the contestant is given a clue as to the mystery word. This clue can be a synonym, a descriptive word, or a general category. If a piece is placed on a space or spaces hiding one of the letters, the letters attached to those spaces are revealed. If the first letter of the word is revealed, it will be highlighted (this was not the case in earlier seasons). While the game is in progress, the contestant may only take a guess at the word while placing a piece (or immediately after, before Ben asks the next question; only one guess is allowed on each piece placed). In addition, once the 120 seconds expire, the contestant is permitted a brief interval of time within which to make a guess.

If the contestant guesses the word correctly, they earn €1,000 (originally 40,000 Belgian francs) and can come back the next day to try again. If the word is not found, they earn €250 (originally 10,000 Belgian francs) for each complete line on the board (which are recolored rather than cleared in this round), but must retire from the show. (It is possible for a contestant to reach €1,000 by completing lines, however, the round is only considered won if the contestant successfully guesses the word.) If they can win 3 times, then in addition to the €3,000 won thus far, the contestant wins a bonus prize package usually consisting of a flatscreen TV and a video camera. Like the American game show The $1,000,000 Chance of a Lifetime, but unlike other game shows, a contestant can return as champion as long as they win the main game and the subsequent finale, the current record standing at 13 recurrent appearances on the show.

- Kiana Buttiens: 13 appearances, 13th finale reached, word not guessed (January 2020)
- Ewout Leys: 12 appearances, 12th finale not reached (June 2018)
- Saar Bossuyt: 11 appearances, 11th finale reached, word not guessed (September 2013)

== Show elements ==
- Only the first answer given by the contestant can be accepted. Even the smallest error in an answer (for example: not pronouncing a letter at the end of the word) renders the answer incorrect.
- A Viking used to appear frequently behind the showmaster.
- The off-screen jury (consisting of only 1 person) corrects Ben when he gets something wrong.
- Ben Crabbé is a major music and sports fan. He has been known to become irritated with contestants who don't know the answer to a sports/music question.
- The record of most points collected in the first 3 rounds, is 1440.
- Jo met de Banjo, a Belgian DJ and former TV star, is responsible for warming up the crowd.
- As of season 15, the set design has completely changed. The introtune has been rewritten by Regi Penxten.
  - In season 18, the set was redesigned again, this time with music by Bent Van Looy.
- Originally, the contestants controlled red and blue pieces. This was later changed to green and yellow pieces, then back to red and blue, then to red and yellow. Currently, the contestants control blue and yellow pieces.
- A children's version of the show has also aired, called "Blokjes" (literally means "small blocks"). In this version, the winning contestant plays for a trip. This is because in European game shows, it is illegal for a game show to award children money.
