= Heterdaad =

Belgian Dutch-language crime drama TV series

- Created by: drama, crime
- Developed by: Ward Hulselmans
- Written by: Ward Hulselmans
- Directed by: Mark De Geest, Marc Lybaert, Anne Ingelbrecht, Frank Van Mechelen
- Starring: Jo De Meyere; Oswald Versp; Gilda De Bal; Ben Van Ostade; Dirk Tuypens; Kris Cuppens
- Theme music composer: Johan Hoogewijs
- Country of origin: Belgium
- Original language: Dutch
- No. of seasons: 4
- No. of episodes: 40

Production
- Producer: Tia Merecy
- Editor: Luc Provoost
- Running time: 55 minutes

Original release
- Network: Eén
- Release: 1996

Related
- Flikken

Heterdaad was a Belgian television series involving the activities of BOB, the former Belgian security and search brigade which was part of the gendarmerie. It was aired on Eén between 1996 and 1999. It was the intention to produce 5 seasons but as the BOB was dismantled season 5 was never made. The series and characters were created by Ward Hulselmans.

== Main cast ==
Actor	Character	Function	Period
Gilda De Bal	Matti Tomassetti	First chief guard	1996-1999
Ben Van Ostade	Tibo Leemans	First waitmaster	1996-1999
Jo De Meyere	John Nauwelaerts	Adjutant-chef	1996-1999
Oswald Versyp	Sylvain Van Mechelen	First waitmaster	1996-1999
Dirk Tuypens	Reggie Bax	First chief guard	1996-1999
Kris Cuppens	Willy Martens	waitmaster	1996-1999
Hans De Munter	Bruno Snoeckx	Captain	1996-1997
Karel Deruwe	Gino Capellen	Lieutenant	1997-1999

== Episodes ==
Season	Episode numbers	# of episodes	(Belgium) Year aired
1	1 - 10	10	1996
2	11 - 20	10	1997
3	21 - 30	10	1998
4	31 - 40	10	1999
