= 13th Ensor Awards =

Gala of the Ensors
- Date: 4 February 2023

Highlights
- Best Picture: Close
- Most awards: Close

The 13th Ensor Awards, presented by the Ensor Academy, took place on the 4th of February 2023 at the end of the Ostend Film Festival to honor Flemish films of 2022. The festival was attended by a record 48,000 visitors. The ceremonies were opened by Erhan Demirci and Kawtar Ehlalouch, with 22 of the 29 categories presented that evening. Close won the most Ensors with 6 wins and 13 nominations. In television, the series Roomies won the most with 4 Ensor wins.

== Winners and nominees ==
Winners are listed first, highlighted in boldface, and indicated with a double dagger (‡).

Best Film	Best Fiction Series
**Close – Lukas Dhont**‡; H4Z4RD; Nowhere; Rebel; Zillion	**Roomies – Kato De Boeck and Flo Van Deuren**‡; Chantal; Billie vs Benjamin; Money Wolves; Uncles
Best Director (Film)	Best Director (Fiction Series)
**Lukas Dhont – Close**‡; Jonas Govaerts – H4Z4RD; Peter Monsaert – Nowhere; Adil El Arbi, Bilall Fallah – Rebel; Robin Pront – Zillion	**Flo Van Deuren, Kato De Boeck – Roomies**‡; Jeroen Dumoulein – Chantal; Dries Vos, Tim Van Aelst – Billie vs Benjamin; Ibbe Daniëls, Kaat Beels, Nathalie Basteyns – Lost Luggage; Jelle Gordyn – Uncles
Best Lead Role (Film)	Best Supporting Role (Film)
**Eden Dambrine – Close**‡; Koen De Bouw – Nowhere; Aboubakr Bensaihi – Rebel; Jonas Vermeulen – Zillion; Charlotte Timmers – Zillion	**Matteo Simoni – Zillion**‡; Gustav De Waele – Close; Émilie Dequenne – Close; Léa Drucker – Close; Barbara Sarafian – Zillion
Best Lead Role (Fiction Series)	Best Supporting Role (Fiction Series)
**Maaike Cafmeyer – Chantal**‡; Tom Van Dyck – Money Wolves; Charlotte Timmers – Billie vs Benjamin; Ahlaam Teghadouini – Roomies; Laura De Geest – Roomies	**Joke Emmers – Billie vs Benjamin**‡; Mathias Sercu – Chantal; Romy Louise Lauwers – Roomies; Martha Canga Antonio – Roomies; Jeroen Perceval – Billie vs Benjamin
Best Screenplay (Film)	Best Screenplay (Fiction Series)
**Angelo Tijssens, Lukas Dhont – Close**‡; Jonas Govaerts, Trent Haaga – H4Z4RD; Peter Monsaert – Nowhere; Adil El Arbi, Bilall Fallah, Jan Van Dyck, Kevin Meul – Rebel; Robin Pront, Kevin Meul – Zillion	**Kato De Boeck – Roomies**‡; Flo Van Deuren, Mathias Sercu – Chantal; Jelle De Beule, Rik Verheye, Koen De Poorter – Uncles; David Vennix, Tim Van Aelst – Billie vs Benjamin; Charles De Weerdt, Edith Huybreghts, Mathias Claeys, Michel Sabbe, Tiny Bertels – Lost Luggage
Best Documentary Film	Best Documentary TV
**Our Nature**‡; Kind Hearts; New Pigs on the Block; A Parked Life; Why We Fight?	**Mixed Race of Belgium**‡; Ket&Doc; The Hijacking of the Pompei; Chasing Beauty: Perfect Perfection?; True Crime Belgium
Best Music	Box Office Award
**Mick Lemaire, Lara Chedraoui, Patrix, Juicy, Miss Angel Oriana Ikomo, Tessa Dixson, Ana Diaz, SPACEBABYMADCHA – Roomies**‡; Dirk Brossé – Our Nature; Valentin Hadjadj – Close; Hannes De Maeyer, Aboubakr Bensaihi, Oum – Rebel; B1980 – Zillion	**Zillion – Robin Pront, Hilde De Laere**‡
Best Short Film	Best Youth Fiction
**Light – Sarah Lederman**‡; Red Giant – Anne Verbeure; Luce and the Rock – Britt Raes; The Fruit Tree – Isabelle Tollenaere; Nocturnus – Harm Dens, Meltse Van Coillie	**#LikeMe**‡; 3Hz; Hacked; The Claus Family 3; Zeppos – The Mercator Trail
Best Animated Film	Best Editing
**Interstellar Ella**‡; Knight Mouse - Christmas Special	**Bert Jacobs – Zillion**‡; Alain Dessauvage – Close; Maarten Janssens – H4Z4RD; Frédéric Thoraval – Rebel; Dieter Diependaele – Kind Hearts
Best Director of Photography	Best Sound
**Frank van den Eeden – Close**‡; Dries Delputte – H4Z4RD; Robrecht Heyvaert – Rebel; Esmoreit Lutters – Roomies; Robrecht Heyvaert – Zillion	**Vincent Sinceretti, Yanna Soentjens – Close**‡; Antoin Cox, Herman Pieëte – Zillion; Jan Deca, Seppe van Groeningen – Two Summers; Marijn Thijs – H4Z4RD; Guilhem Donzel, Jamie Baksht, Jeroen Truijens, Loïc Collignon, Michelle Couttolenc – Rebel
Best Art Direction	Best Make-Up
**Geert Paredis – Zillion**‡; Eve Martin – Close; Bart Van Loo – Money Wolves; Pepijn Van Looy – Rebel; Jonathan Van Essche – Roomies	**Dorien Van Poucke – Uncles**‡; Liesbet Fijalka – Chantal; Charlotte Blommaert – H4Z4RD; Evie Hamels, Nathalie De Hen, Oriane de Neve, Véronique Dubray – Rebel; Labhise Allara Mandango Ciratu – Zillion
Best Costume Design	Best Co-Production
**Catherine Van Bree – Zillion**‡; Manu Verschueren – Close; Mathilde De Wit, Uli Simon – Rebel; Isabel Van Renterghem – Roomies; Tine Verbeurgt – Chantal	**The Eight Mountains – Charlotte Vandermeersch, Felix van Groeningen**‡
Best French-Speaking Belgian Production	Promise of the Year
**Nobody Has to Know**‡	**Flo Van Deuren, Kato De Boeck – Roomies**‡
Lifetime Achievement Award	Award for Exceptional Contribution
**François Beukelaers**‡	**Joop Daalmeijer**‡
Telenet Audience Award	
**Close – Lukas Dhont**‡
