= Matthias Schoenaerts =

Belgian actor (born 1977)

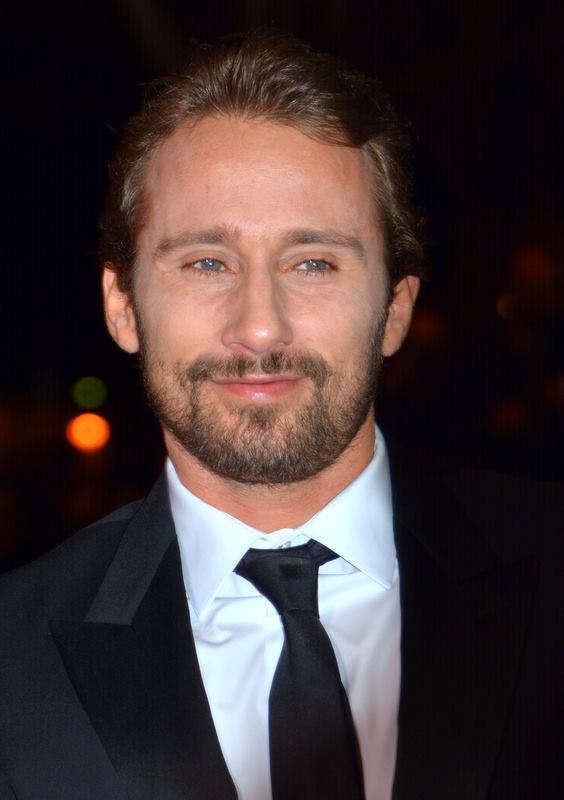
- Schoenaerts in 2016
- Born: 8 December 1977 (age 48); Antwerp, Flanders, Belgium
- Occupation: Actor
- Years active: 1992–present

Matthias Schoenaerts (/ˈʃoʊnɑːrts/ SHOH-narts, Dutch: [ˈmɑtjɑs ˈsxunaːrts]; born 8 December 1977) is a Belgian actor. He made his film debut at the age of 14 in Daens (1992), which was nominated for the Academy Award for Best Foreign Language Film. He is best known for his roles as Filip in Loft (2008), Jacky Vanmarsenille in the Oscar-nominated Bullhead (2011), and Ali in the BAFTA and Golden Globe-nominee Rust and Bone (2012), for which he won the César Award for Most Promising Actor. He played Eric Deeds in The Drop (2014), Bruno von Falk in Suite Française (2015), Gabriel Oak in Far from the Madding Crowd (2015), Hans Axgil in The Danish Girl (2015), and Uncle Vanya in Red Sparrow (2018).

Schoenaerts received critical acclaim for his portrayal of an ex-soldier suffering from PTSD in Disorder (2015), and for his performance as an inmate training a wild horse in The Mustang (2019).

In 2015, he was named Knight of the Order of Arts and Letters in France.

== Early life ==
Schoenaerts was born in Antwerp, Flanders, the Dutch-speaking region of Belgium. He is the son of actor Julien Schoenaerts (1925–2006) and Dominique Wiche (1953–2016), a costume designer, translator and French teacher. He has an older half brother, Bruno Schoenaerts (born 1953), who is a lawyer. Schoenaerts is of Flemish descent through his father. His maternal grandmother is from Liège, Wallonia, the French-speaking region of Belgium. For the first six years of his life, he lived with his maternal grandparents in Brussels.

Schoenaerts grew up bilingual, speaking Dutch and French. He is also fluent in English, which he learned by watching American films.

In 1987, at nine years old, he appeared in a stage production of Antoine de Saint-Exupéry's The Little Prince opposite his father, who also directed the play. His mother, Dominique, was the costume designer of the play.

Schoenaerts started producing graffiti as a teenager under the pseudonym "Zenith". He went to New York City to collaborate with the Bronx group TATS CRU.

Schoenaerts was close to becoming a professional association football player and was on the books of Belgian team Beerschot AC, but gave up when he was 16 years old. In 2013, Schoenaerts said that he was a fan of the Spanish football club FC Barcelona.

== Career ==
=== Early work in Belgium and Netherlands (1992–2011) ===
At the age of 13, Schoenaerts made his film debut with a small role in the 1992 Belgian film Daens, which was nominated for the Academy Award for Best Foreign Language Film. His father starred in the film but they did not share any scenes together.

After completing studies at The Academy of Dramatic Arts in Antwerp, he featured in several shorts and feature films. In 2002, he starred in Dorothée Van Den Berghe's Meisje (Girl); Tom Barman's Any Way the Wind Blows in 2003; Rudolf Mestdagh's Ellektra and Roel Mondelaers and Raf Reyntjens's sci-fi short film A Message from Outer Space, which Schoenaerts also produced in 2004. In 2003, Schoenaerts was named one of "Europe's Shooting Stars" by the European Film Promotion.

In 2006, Schoenaerts played Dennis in Hilde Van Mieghem's Love Belongs to Everyone. He had a small role as a member of the Dutch resistance in Paul Verhoeven's Black Book.

In 2007, he starred in Ben van Lieshout's film De Muze, and in Erik Bruyn's Nadine. In 2008, he played Bob in Pieter van Hees's horror film Left Bank, and most notably played the role of Filip in Erik Van Looy's Loft, which became the most successful Flemish film at the Belgian box-office, earning over $7,075,161. In the same year, Schoenaerts starred in the mini-series The Emperor of Taste (De smaak van De Keyser), playing a Belgian soldier in World War II.

In 2009, he starred in Dorothée Van Den Berghe's My Queen Karo, in which he played the hippie Raven in 1970s Amsterdam. In 2010, he played the lead role in Alex Stockman's techno-thriller Pulsar, and had a cameo in Franck Richard's La Meute (The Pack).

In 2011, Schoenaerts starred in the Dutch films The Gang of Oss (De Bende van Oss) and The President (De President).

=== Breakthrough: Bullhead and Rust and Bone (2011–2013) ===
In 2011, Schoenaerts played Jacky Vanmarsenille, the lead role in Bullhead, directed by Michaël R. Roskam, which was nominated for the Best Foreign Language Oscar. His performance in the film was well received and won him the FIPRESCI Award for best actor at the Palm Springs International Film Festival in January 2012. The jury praised the actor's "superb portrayal of an innocent and sensitive man trapped in a truculent body." He also won the Magritte Award for Best Actor.

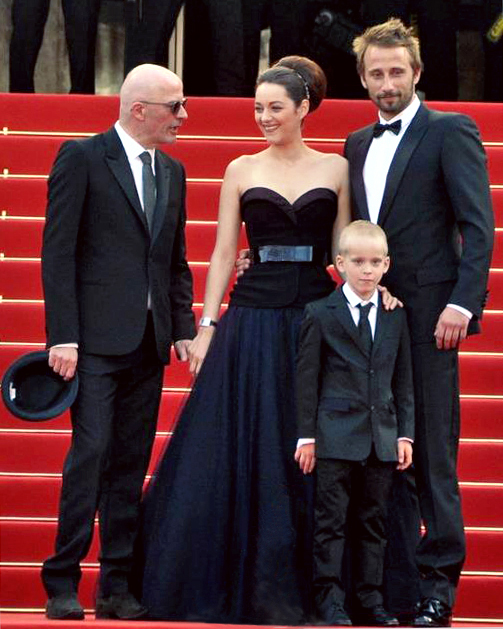
Schoenaerts next to Marion Cotillard, Armand Verdure and Jacques Audiard during the premiere of Rust and Bone at the Cannes Film Festival in 2012.

In 2012, he starred in Jacques Audiard's Rust and Bone (De rouille et d'os) alongside Marion Cotillard. The film premiered at the 2012 Cannes Film Festival and was a critical and box office hit in France. On 22 February 2013, Matthias won the César Award for Most Promising Actor for his role in Rust and Bone.

Schoenaerts produced and starred in the Belgian short film Death of a Shadow (Dood van een Schaduw), directed by Tom Van Avermaet. On 10 January 2013, the short film was nominated for the Academy Award for Best Live Action Short Film.

The New York Times described Schoenaerts as "the most versatile beefcake actor of our time" in 2012.

In 2013, he narrated the Flemish version of the Disneynature documentary Chimpanzee.

=== International success (2014-present) ===
In 2014, Schoenaerts appeared alongside Clive Owen, Billy Crudup and again Marion Cotillard in the thriller Blood Ties, in which he played Anthony Scarfo. The film premiered at the 2013 Cannes Film Festival.

He played Eric Deeds in The Drop, his second film with Michael R. Roskam, starring opposite Tom Hardy, Noomi Rapace and James Gandolfini.

In 2015, Schoenaerts appeared in seven films: The Loft, the American remake of the Belgian film Loft, in which he played the same character and which was his first English-language film; in Saul Dibb's Suite Française, playing the German officer Bruno von Falk opposite Michelle Williams and Kristin Scott Thomas; in Thomas Vinterberg's Far from the Madding Crowd as Gabriel Oak, one of Carey Mulligan's three love interests; in Alan Rickman's period drama A Little Chaos, as French landscape architect André Le Nôtre, opposite Kate Winslet. In the same year, Schoenaerts was announced as William Clark on HBO's miniseries Lewis and Clark, co-starring Casey Affleck as Meriwether Lewis. Production got shut down in August 2015 due to "internal and external, weather-related factors".

Schoenaerts starred in Alice Winocour's French thriller Disorder (Maryland), as an ex-soldier suffering from post traumatic stress disorder, for which his performance was highly praised. He played Paul in Luca Guadagnino's erotic thriller A Bigger Splash, starring opposite Tilda Swinton, Ralph Fiennes and Dakota Johnson, and played the art-dealer Hans Axgil in Tom Hooper's The Danish Girl. A Bigger Splash and The Danish Girl made their world premieres at the 2015 Venice Film Festival, both were screened in the official competition.

On 28 July 2015, Schoenaerts was named a Knight of the Order of Arts and Letters in France.

In January 2016, it was announced that Schoenaerts would play a drummer who begins to lose his hearing in Darius Marder's Sound of Metal. After a couple of years in development, Schoenaerts was replaced by Riz Ahmed.

In 2017, Schoenaerts reteamed with Michaël R. Roskam in the Belgian film Racer and the Jailbird (Le Fidèle), in the role of a gangster named Gigi. The film was Roskam and Schoenaerts's first film in Belgium since 2011's Bullhead. In the same year, Schoenaerts played Gene, Jane Fonda's son on the Netflix film Our Souls at Night, also starring Robert Redford and directed by Ritesh Batra.

He worked again with director Thomas Vinterberg in 2018's Kursk, a film about the Kursk submarine disaster of 2000 in which Schoenaerts played Russian Navy captain-lieutenant Mikhail Kalekov.

In 2018, Schoenaerts co-starred in Francis Lawrence's spy thriller Red Sparrow in the role of Uncle Vanya opposite Jennifer Lawrence, Joel Edgerton and Jeremy Irons. He starred in the Belgian-French film Close Enemies, directed by David Oelhoffen.

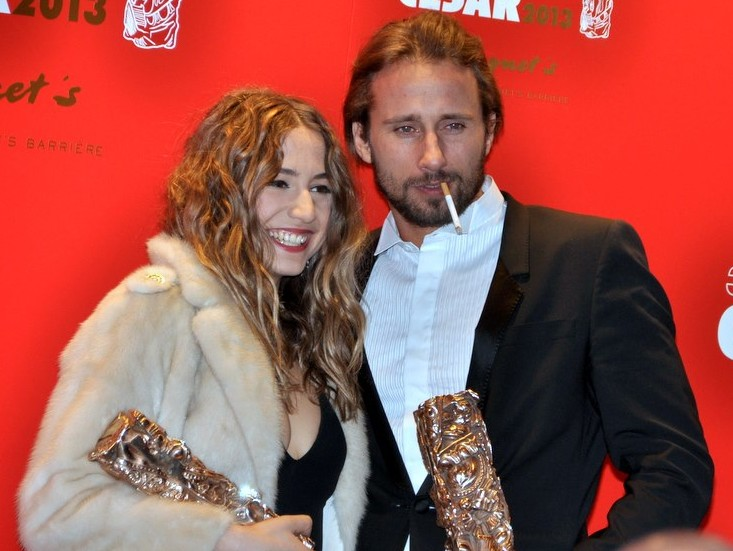
Schoenaerts holding his award at the 2013 César Awards ceremony.

In 2019, Schoenaerts appeared as Captain Herder in Terrence Malick's A Hidden Life, as Maywood in Steven Soderbergh's The Laundromat, and as Roman Coleman, an inmate who participates in a rehabilitation program centered around training of wild horses in Laure de Clermont-Tonnerre's The Mustang. In 2020, he appeared in Gina Prince-Bythewood's The Old Guard as Booker / Sébastien le Livre, once a French soldier who fought under Napoleon.

In 2021, Schoenaerts starred as Peter Flood in Jeremie Guez's Brothers by Blood and as Jurgen in the Flemish TV anthology Lockdown episode "Zuur" alongside him was Veerle Baetens. His upcoming works include Terrence Malick's The Way of the Wind, Justin Kurzel's Ruin alongside Margot Robbie, and David O. Russell's Amsterdam. In 2023, He starred in the TV series Django as the title character.

In September 2024 Schoenaerts was cast in the DC Universe film Supergirl as the villain Krem of the Yellow Hills, with Milly Alcock starring as the title character.

=== Other ventures ===
Schoenaerts was the face of Louis Vuitton Menswear Spring/Summer 2014.

=== Directorial debut ===
His directorial debut, Franky, is a documentary about a one-legged childhood friend of his who became an MMA fighter, Franky van Hove. The documentary is currently in post-production.

=== Hakuna Casting ===
On 24 August 2015, it was reported that Schoenaerts became the co-owner of the Belgian casting agency Hakuna Casting, which focuses on people of ethnic origin.

The agency has collaborated on the casting of films like Black by Adil El Arbi and Bilall Fallah, and Belgica by Felix Van Groeningen.

== Legal issues ==
In December 2025, Schoenaerts was sentenced in Beringen to six months imprisonment, a €4,000 fine, and a one-year driving ban, after the actor was caught driving without a valid driving licence.

== Filmography ==
Key
†	Denotes works that have not yet been released

=== Film ===
Year	Title	Role	Notes
1992	Daens	Wannes Scholliers	
1999	Tobias Totz and his Lion		Flemish dub
2002	De blauwe roos	Minnaar	Short
2002	Waternimf		Short
2002	Meisje a.k.a. Girl	Oskar	
2003	Zien	Man	Short
2003	Any Way the Wind Blows	Chouki	
2004	Je veux quelque chose et je ne sais pas quoi	Jaap	Short
2004	A Message from Outer Space	Frits	Short
2004	Ellektra	DJ Cosmonaut X	
2004	Gender		Short
2005	Another Day	Man	Short
2005	The End of the Ride	Samuel	Short
2005	Daughter	Mattias	Short
2005	Exit	Anthony	Short
2005	The One Thing to Do	Edward Monskii	Short
2006	Retour	Maxime	Short
2006	Love Belongs to Everyone	Dennis	
2006	Black Book	Joop	
2007	The Muse	John	
2007	Nadine	Cornee	
2008	Left Bank	Bob	
2008	Tunnelrat	John Atkins	Short
2008	Loft	Filip Willems	
2009	Afterday	Jef	Short
2009	My Queen Karo	Raven	
2010	The Pack	Le Gothique en toc	
2010	Pulsar	Samuel Verbist	
2010	Injury Time	Van Dessel	Short
2011	Bullhead	Jacky Vanmarsenille	Magritte Award for Best Actor; Flanders Film Award for Best Actor; AFI Fest New Auteur's Critic Prize for Best Actor; Fantastic Fest New Wave Award for Best Actor; Les Arcs European Film Festival for Best Actor; Palm Springs International Film Festival FIPRESCI Prize for Best Actor; Nominated—International Cinephile Society Award for Best Actor
2011	The President	Boyko	
2011	The Gang of Oss	Ties van Heesch	
2012	Rust and Bone	Ali	César Award for Most Promising Actor; Étoiles d'Or Award for Best Male Newcomer; Valladolid International Film Festival for Best Actor; Nominated—Magritte Award for Best Actor; Nominated—Lumière Award for Best Actor; Nominated—Globe de Cristal Award for Best Actor; Nominated—Prix Patrick Dewaere; Nominated—Dublin Film Critics' Circle for Best Actor
2012	Death of a Shadow	Nathan Rijckx	Short
2013	Chimpanzee	Narrator (Belgian Dutch version)	Documentary
2013	Blood Ties	Anthony Scarfo	
2014	The Drop	Eric Deeds	
2014	A Little Chaos	André Le Nôtre	
2014	The Loft	Philip Williams	
2015	Suite Française	Bruno von Falk	
2015	Far from the Madding Crowd	Gabriel Oak	
2015	Disorder	Vincent	Nominated—Prix Patrick Dewaere
2015	The Danish Girl	Hans Axgil	Capri Hollywood International Film Festival Award for Revelation of the Year
2015	A Bigger Splash	Paul De Smedt	
2017	Our Souls at Night	Gene	
2017	Racer and the Jailbird	Gigi	Ensor Award for Best Actor; Nominated—Magritte Award for Best Actor
2018	Red Sparrow	Ivan Vladimirovich Egorov	
2018	Kursk	Mikhail Averin	
2018	Close Enemies	Manuel Marco	
2019	The Mustang	Roman Coleman	Nominated—Independent Spirit Award for Best Male Lead
2019	A Hidden Life	Captain Herder	
2019	The Laundromat	Maywood	
2020	The Old Guard	Booker/Sébastien Le Livre	
2020	Brothers by Blood	Peter Flood	
2022	Amsterdam	Lem Getwiller	
2025	The Old Guard 2	Booker/Sébastien Le Livre	
2026	Supergirl	Krem of the Yellow Hills	
TBA	The Way of the Wind †	Saint Peter	Post-production
TBA	Fleur †		Filming

=== Television ===
Year	Title	Role	Notes
2001	Flikken	Jens Goossens	Episode: "Corrupt"
2002	Stille waters	Rechercheur	Episode #1.8
2008	De Smaak van De Keyser a.k.a. The Emperor of Taste	Alfred Lenaerts	8 episodes
2009	Los zand	Vincent Vandeweghe	13 episodes
2010	Duts	Himself	Episode: "De nieuwe buurman"
2015	De Biker Boys	Himself	Episode: "De reconstructie"
2021	Lockdown	Jurgen	Episode: "Zuur" with Veerle Baetens
2023	Django	Django	
2024	The Regime	Herbert Zubak	Miniseries

== Awards and nominations ==
Year	Association	Category	Work	Result
2003	Berlin International Film Festival	EFP Shooting Star		Won
2009	Monte-Carlo TV Festival	Golden Nymph for Outstanding Actor - Drama Series	De smaak van De Keyser	Nominated
2011	Flanders Film Awards	Best Actor	Bullhead	Won
2011	AFI Fest	New Auteurs Critic's Prize For Best Actor	Bullhead	Won
2011	Austin Fantastic Fest	Next Wave Award for Best Actor	Bullhead	Won
2011	Les Arcs European Film Festival	Best Actor	Bullhead	Won
2011	2-in-1 International Film Festival	Heroes Award for Best Actor	Bullhead	Won
2011	Saint-Jean-de-Luz Young Filmmakers Festival	Best Actor	Bullhead	Won
2011	Ostend Film Festival	Ensor Award Best Actor	Bullhead	Won
2012	Palm Springs International Film Festival	FIPRESCI Prize for Best Actor	Bullhead	Won
2012	Magritte Award	Best Actor	Bullhead	Won
2012	Valladolid International Film Festival	Best Actor	Rust and Bone	Won
2012	Dublin Film Critics' Circle	Best Actor	Rust and Bone	Nominated
2013	César Award	Most Promising Actor	Rust and Bone	Won
2013	Magritte Award	Best Actor	Rust and Bone	Nominated
2013	Lumière Awards	Best Actor	Rust and Bone	Nominated
2013	Globes de Cristal Award	Best Actor	Rust and Bone	Nominated
2013	Chlotrudis Awards	Best Actor	Rust and Bone	Nominated
2013	Étoiles d'Or	Best Male Newcomer	Rust and Bone	Won
2013	CinEuphoria Awards	Best International Actor	Rust and Bone	Won
2013	CinEuphoria Awards	Best International Actor	Bullhead	Won
2013	International Cinephile Society Awards	Best Actor	Bullhead	Nominated
2013	Chlotrudis Awards	Best Actor	Bullhead	Nominated
2013	Prix Patrick Dewaere			Nominated
2015	Ostend Film Festival	Outstanding Achievement		Won
2015	Capri Hollywood International Film Festival	Revelation of the Year	The Danish Girl	Won
2016	Prix Patrick Dewaere			Nominated
2016	Elle Style Awards	Actor of the Year		Won
2018	Ostend Film Festival	Ensor Award Best Actor	Racer and the Jailbird	Won
2018	Magritte Award	Best Actor	Racer and the Jailbird	Nominated
2019	Women Film Critics Circle	Best Actor	The Mustang	Nominated
2020	Independent Spirit Awards	Best Male Lead	The Mustang	Nominated
2020	Chlotrudis Awards	Best Actor	The Mustang	Won

=== Other honors ===
- Flemish Television Star: 2008
- Flemish Film Personality: 2011
- Knight in the French Ordre des Arts et des Lettres: 2015
