= Robrecht Heyvaert =

Belgian cinematographer

- Occupation: Cinematographer
- Years active: 2010–present

Robrecht Heyvaert is a Belgian cinematographer who has worked on films and TV series in Europe, the USA, the UK, Africa and the Middle East.

== Career ==
Heyvaert is known for his work on films like Bad Boys for Life, Bad Boys: Ride or Die, Revenge and Black and has worked on the pilot episodes of series Ms. Marvel, Snowfall and The Kollective.

He collaborated with director Robin Pront on The Ardennes (2015), for which he received the Best Cinematography Award at the Ensor Awards. They teamed up again on Zillion in 2022.

Heyvaert has collaborated with directors Adil El Arbi and Bilall Fallah on 3 Belgian features Gangsta (2018), Black (2015) and Image (2014), before working together on Bad Boys for Life. They have done 6 films and 2 TV series together.

He has collaborated twice with Director Tim Mielants. Their first collaboration was the Belgian war drama Wil. In 2024, Heyvaert and Mielants worked on Steve, which will premiere at the 2025 edition of the Toronto Film Festival.

Heyvaert was nominated seven times for the Best Cinematography Award at the Ensor Awards and won the award twice.

== Filmography ==
=== Film ===
Year	Title	Director
2014	Image	Adil El Arbi; Bilall Fallah
2015	Black	Adil El Arbi; Bilall Fallah
2015	The Ardennes	Robin Pront
2016	Everybody Happy	Nic Balthazar
2017	Blind Spot	Nabil Ben Yadir
2018	Revenge	Coralie Fargeat
2018	Gangsta	Adil El Arbi; Bilall Fallah
2018	The Bouncer	Julien Leclercq
2019	Torpedo	Sven Huybrechts
2020	Bad Boys for Life	Adil El Arbi; Bilall Fallah
2022	Rebel	Adil El Arbi; Bilall Fallah
2022	Zillion	Robin Pront
2023	Wil	Tim Mielants
2024	Meanwhile on Earth	Jérémy Clapin
2024	Bad Boys: Ride or Die	Adil El Arbi; Bilall Fallah
2025	Steve	Tim Mielants
2026	7 Dogs	Adil El Arbi; Bilall Fallah
2027	The Resurrection of the Christ: Part One	Mel Gibson
2028	The Resurrection of the Christ: Part Two	Mel Gibson

=== Television ===
Year	Title	Director	Notes
2011–2012	2 Hollywood	Raf Roosens; Cecilia Verheyden	
2012	Bergica	Adil El Arbi; Bilall Fallah	
2012–2014	Vermist	Jan Verheyen; Cecilia Verheyden; Kobe Van Steenberghe	8 episodes
2017	Snowfall	Adil El Arbi; Bilall Fallah	Episode: "Pilot"
2021	Lockdown	Robin Pront	
2022	Ms. Marvel	Adil El Arbi; Bilall Fallah	Episodes: "Generation Why" and "No Normal"
2025	The Kollective	Assaf Bernstein	Episode: "Pilot"
