= Magritte Award for Best Actor =

Belgian film award

- Presented by: Académie André Delvaux
- First award: 2011
- Currently held by: Yannick Renier, Reflection in a Dead Diamond (2025)
- Website: lesmagritteducinema.com

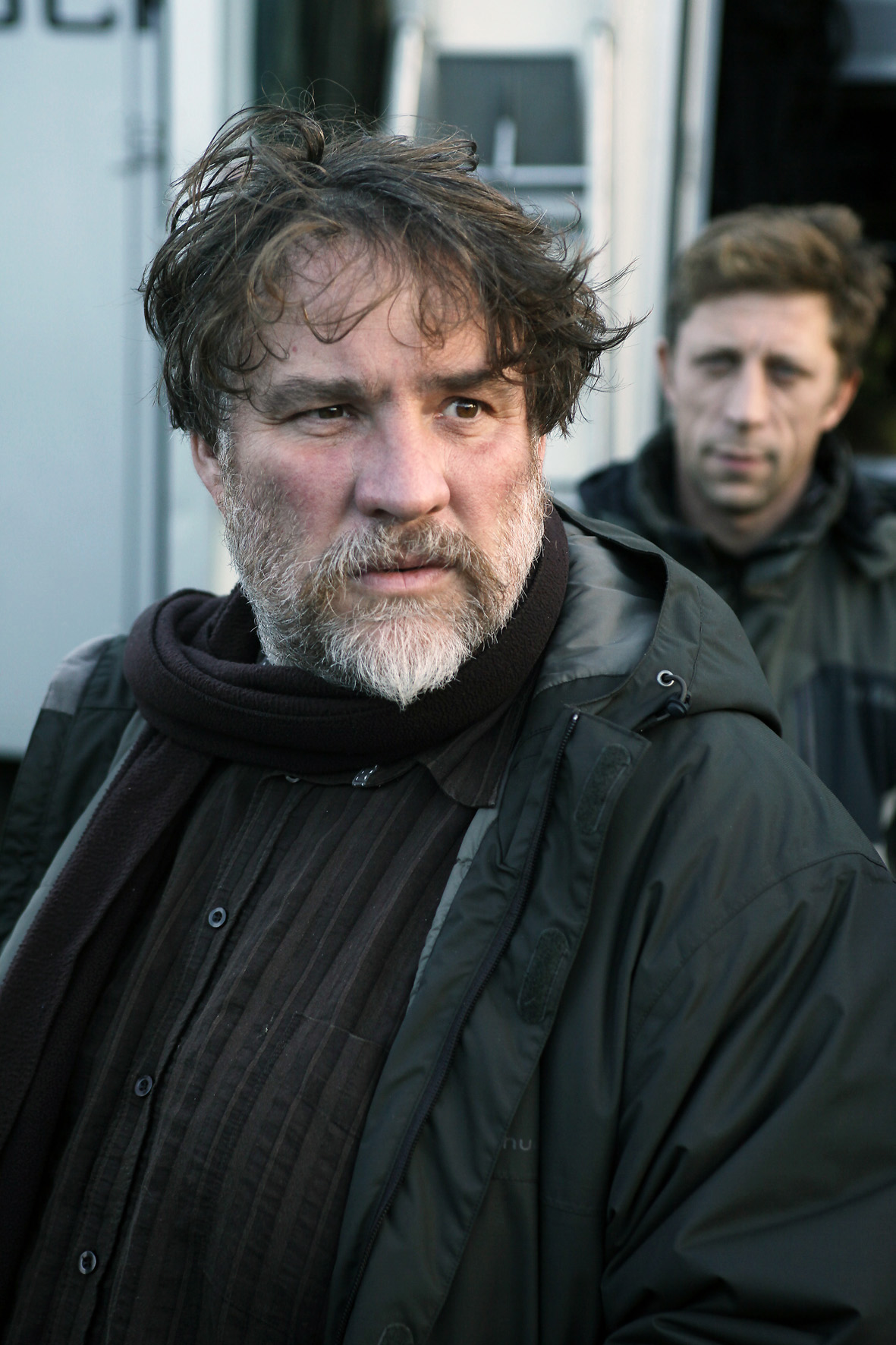
Bouli Lanners on the set of his film "The Giants" 2010

The Magritte Award for Best Actor (French: Magritte du meilleur acteur) is an award presented annually by the Académie André Delvaux. It is given in honor of an actor who has delivered an outstanding performance in a leading role while working within the film industry. It is one of the Magritte Awards, which were established to recognize excellence in Belgian cinematic achievements.

The 1st Magritte Awards ceremony was held in 2011 with Jonathan Zaccaï receiving the award for his role in Private Lessons. As of the 2026 ceremony, Yannick Renier is the most recent winner in this category for his role in Reflection in a Dead Diamond.

== Winners and nominees ==
In the list below, winners are listed first in the colored row, followed by the other nominees.

=== 2010s ===
| Year | Actor | English title | Original title |
|---|---|---|---|
| 2010 (1st) | Jonathan Zaccaï | Private Lessons | Élève libre |
| 2010 (1st) | Mounir Ait Hamou | The Barons | Les Barons |
| 2010 (1st) | Olivier Gourmet | Angel at Sea | Un ange à la mer |
| 2010 (1st) | Thierry Hancisse | The Boat Race | La Régate |
| 2011 (2nd) | Matthias Schoenaerts | Bullhead | Rundskop |
| 2011 (2nd) | Dominique Abel | The Fairy | La Fée |
| 2011 (2nd) | Benoît Poelvoorde | Romantics Anonymous | Les Émotifs anonymes |
| 2011 (2nd) | Jonathan Zaccaï | A Distant Neighborhood | Quartier lointain |
| 2012 (3rd) | Olivier Gourmet | The Minister | L'Exercice de l'État |
| 2012 (3rd) | Benoît Poelvoorde | Le grand soir | |
| 2012 (3rd) | Jérémie Renier | My Way | Cloclo |
| 2012 (3rd) | Matthias Schoenaerts | Rust and Bone | De rouille et d'os |
| 2013 (4th) | Benoît Poelvoorde | A Place on Earth | Une place sur la Terre |
| 2013 (4th) | François Damiens | Tango libre | |
| 2013 (4th) | Jan Hammenecker | Tango libre | |
| 2013 (4th) | Sam Louwyck | The Fifth Season | La Cinquième Saison |
| 2014 (5th) | Fabrizio Rongione | Two Days, One Night | Deux jours, une nuit |
| 2014 (5th) | François Damiens | Playing Dead | Je fais le mort |
| 2014 (5th) | Bouli Lanners | Lulu in the Nude | Lulu femme nue |
| 2014 (5th) | Benoît Poelvoorde | Scouting for Zebras | Les Rayures du zèbre |
| 2015 (6th) | Wim Willaert | I'm Dead but I Have Friends | Je suis mort mais j'ai des amis |
| 2015 (6th) | François Damiens | La Famille Bélier | |
| 2015 (6th) | Bouli Lanners | All Cats Are Grey | Tous les chats sont gris |
| 2015 (6th) | Jérémie Renier | The Wakhan Front | Ni le ciel ni la terre |
| 2016 (7th) | Jean-Jacques Rausin | Death by Death | Je me tue à le dire |
| 2016 (7th) | Aboubakr Bensaihi | Black | |
| 2016 (7th) | François Damiens | Les Cowboys | |
| 2016 (7th) | Bouli Lanners | The First, the Last | Les Premiers, les Derniers |
| 2017 (8th) | Peter Van den Begin | King of the Belgians | |
| 2017 (8th) | François Damiens | Just to Be Sure | Ôtez-moi d'un Doute |
| 2017 (8th) | Jérémie Renier | L'Amant double | |
| 2017 (8th) | Matthias Schoenaerts | Racer and the Jailbird | Le Fidèle |
| 2018 (9th) | Victor Polster | Girl | |
| 2018 (9th) | François Damiens | Mon Ket | |
| 2018 (9th) | Olivier Gourmet | Above the Law | Tueurs |
| 2018 (9th) | Benoît Poelvoorde | Keep an Eye Out | Au poste! |
| 2019 (10th) | Bouli Lanners | Real Love | C'est ça l'amour |
| 2019 (10th) | Kevin Janssens | Patrick | De Patrick |
| 2019 (10th) | Benoît Poelvoorde | Sink or Swim | Le Grand Bain |
| 2019 (10th) | Marc Zinga | The Mercy of the Jungle | La Miséricorde de la Jungle |

=== 2020s ===
| Year | Actor | English title | Original title |
|---|---|---|---|
| 2020/21 (11th) | Jean Le Peltier | Madly in Life | Une vie démente |
| 2020/21 (11th) | Bouli Lanners | Love Song for Tough Guys | Cette musique ne joue pour personne |
| 2020/21 (11th) | Jérémie Renier | Slalom | |
| 2020/21 (11th) | Arieh Worthalter | Hold Me Tight | Serre moi fort |
| 2022 (12th) | Bouli Lanners | The Night of the 12th | La Nuit du 12 |
| 2022 (12th) | Soufiane Chilah | Animals | |
| 2022 (12th) | Benoît Poelvoorde | Inexorable | |
| 2022 (12th) | Jérémie Renier | L'Ennemi | |
| 2022 (12th) | Aboubakr Bensaihi | Rebel | |
| 2023 (13th) | Arieh Worthalter | The Goldman Case | Le Procès Goldman |
| 2023 (13th) | Bouli Lanners | Paint It Gold | Un coup de maître |
| 2023 (13th) | Jérémie Renier | Let's Get Lost | Ailleurs si j'y suis |
| 2023 (13th) | Marc Zinga | Omen | Augure |
| 2024 (14th) | Arieh Worthalter | Life's a Bitch | Chiennes de vie |
| 2024 (14th) | Bouli Lanners | Smoke Signals | Une affaire de principe |
| 2024 (14th) | Benoît Poelvoorde | The Art of Nothing | L'Art d'être heureux |
| 2024 (14th) | Jean-Jacques Rausin | Life's a Bitch | Chiennes de vie |
| 2025 (15th) | Yannick Renier | Reflection in a Dead Diamond | Reflet dans un diamant mort |
| 2025 (15th) | Pierre Bastin | Vitrival – The Most Beautiful Village in the World | Vitrival |
| 2025 (15th) | Jean-Benoît Ugeux | Krump | |
| 2025 (15th) | Arieh Worthalter | Ablaze | Les Braises |
