= Aboubakr Bensaihi =

Belgian actor of Moroccan descent

- Born: Aboubakr Bensaihi; 1996 (age 29–30); Molenbeek, Belgium
- Occupations: Actor; singer; rapper
- Years active: 2015–present
- Musical career
- Genres: Hip hop; R&B
- Instrument: Vocals
- Years active: 2015–present

Aboubakr Bensaihi (born 1996), is a Belgian actor, singer and rapper of Moroccan descent. He is best known for starring as Marwan in the critically acclaimed 2015 film Black and later the 2022 film Rebel.

== Early life ==
He was born in 1996 in and raised in Molenbeek. He completed Dutch-language education at the Imelda Institute.

== Career ==
=== Actor ===
In 2014, Bensaihi was selected for the film Black by the directors Adil El Arbi and Bilall Fallah. Then, he played the lead male character 'Marwan' in the film Black. The film gained positive acclaim and screened at several international film festivals. He was later nominated at the Ensor Best Debut Award at Ostend Film Festival in 2016 and the Best Actor Award at Magritte Awards in 2017. With the success of the film, he joined the soap opera Thuis as 'Junes Bakkal' in 2017. In 2018, he joined the television serial Daidj.

=== Rapper ===
Apart from acting, Bensaihi is also a singer, songwriter and rapper, known by his stage name Bakr. He sang the song Do You Hear Me for the soundtrack of Black. His debut single was Sac à dos which was followed by the successful single Elle a, then he released the song Tomber dans ton love. In 2016, Bensaihi became one of the 10 laureates of Molenbekenaar of the year.

== Filmography ==
Year	Film	Role	Genre	Ref.
2015	Black	Marwan	Film	
2016	The Dinner	Aboubakr	Short film	
2018	eLegal	Yassine Mejri	TV series	
2018	Thuis	Junes Bakkal	TV series	
2018	The Crimson Rivers	Rachid	TV series	
2019	Binti	Farid	Film	
2019	Women of the Night	Rachid	TV series	
2022	Rebel	Kamal Wasaki	Film	
2023	Mocro Maffia	Idris	TV series	

== See also ==
- 7th Magritte Awards
