= 7 Dogs =

2026 film by Adil El Arbi and Bilall Fallah

- Promotional poster
- Directed by: Adil El Arbi and Bilall Fallah
- Screenplay by: Mohamed El-Dabbah
- Story by: Turki Alalshikh
- Produced by: Ivan Atkinson; Cyrus Patel
- Starring: Ahmed Ezz; Karim Abdel Aziz; Monica Bellucci; Nasser Al Qasabi; Sayed Ragab; Tara Emad
- Cinematography: Robrecht Heyvaert
- Edited by: Pieter Smet
- Music by: Lorne Balfe
- Production company: Sela Studios
- Release date: 27 May 2026
- Running time: 123 minutes
- Countries: Saudi Arabia; Egypt
- Languages: Arabic; Egyptian Arabic; English
- Budget: $40 million

7 Dogs (Arabic: الكلاب السبعة, romanized: al-Kilāb as-Sabʿa) is a 2026 action film directed by Adil El Arbi and Bilall Fallah and written by Mohamed El-Dabbah from a story by Turki Alalshikh. The film stars Ahmed Ezz and Karim Abdel Aziz as an Interpol officer and a criminal figure who form an alliance against a transnational criminal network. The ensemble cast also includes Monica Bellucci, Nasser Al Qasabi, Sayed Ragab, Tara Emad, Sandy Bella, Giancarlo Esposito and Max Huang, with Salman Khan and Sanjay Dutt make special appearances.

The film was produced by Sela Studios with support from Saudi Arabia's General Entertainment Authority and Riyadh Season, and was shot largely in Riyadh. It had a reported budget of $40 million and was reported to be the most expensive Arabic-language film ever made. The film premiered in Cairo, Egypt, on May 22, 2026 and was released in the Middle East on 27 May. During production, Sela Studios achieved two Guinness World Records for film stunt explosions.

== Plot ==
Interpol officer Khalid Al-Azzazi captures Ghali Abu Dawood, a senior figure linked to the criminal organization known as 7 Dogs. When the syndicate begins trafficking a synthetic drug called Pink Lady, Khalid is forced to work with Ghali to dismantle the network. Their mission brings them into conflict with regional and international figures connected to the organization, including European distributor Julia Leone.

== Cast ==
The cast includes:

- Ahmed Ezz as Khalid Al-Azzazi
- Karim Abdel Aziz as Ghali Abu Dawood
- Monica Bellucci as Julia Leone
- Nasser Al Qasabi as General Nasser
- Sayed Ragab as General Sabri
- Tara Emad as an Interpol operative
- Sandy Bella as Jessica
- Giancarlo Esposito as Roman Marks
- Max Huang
- Salman Khan as Johar
- Sanjay Dutt as Ranjit
- Menna Shalabi as Sarah
- Hana El Zahed as Rabab
- Francis Ngannou as Security Guard

== Production and release ==
The film's story was conceived by Turki Alalshikh, chairman of Saudi Arabia's General Entertainment Authority. The project moved forward after Alalshikh met directors Adil El Arbi and Bilall Fallah in Riyadh during the 2024 promotional tour for Bad Boys: Ride or Die. Mohamed El-Dabbah wrote the screenplay.

The film was sponsored by the General Entertainment Authority and Riyadh Season, and was produced by Sela Production Services by Black Bear, with Ivan Atkinson serving as producer. The production crew included cinematographer Robrecht Heyvaert, production designer Paul Kirby, costume designers Beatrice Giannini and Mark Bouman, hair and make-up artist Jacqueline Russon, and special-effects supervisor Duncan Capp. The stunts were handled by the 87Eleven team, led by stunt coordinator Stephen Dunlevy.

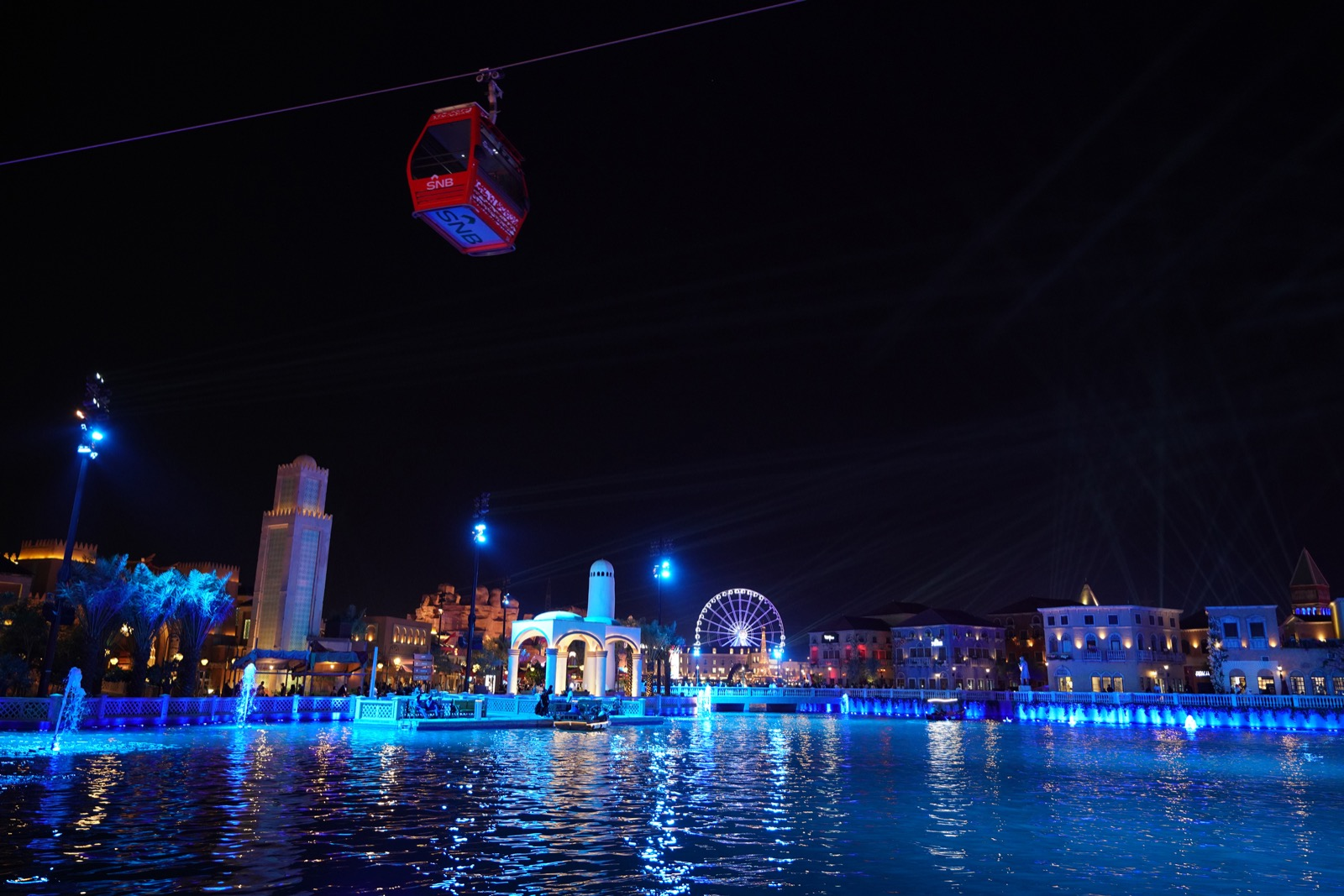
Boulevard City in Riyadh, one of the locations used for filming

The film was shot largely in Riyadh, including at Alhisn Big Time Studios, King Abdullah Financial District and Boulevard City, in the spring of 2025. The production used Saudi crew members and created locations representing several countries within Riyadh.

During filming in Riyadh on 29 August 2025 Sela Studios achieved two Guinness World Records for film stunt explosions: the largest film stunt explosion, measured at 170.7 tonnes of TNT equivalent, surpassing the previous record held by the James Bond film Spectre; and the most high explosives detonated in a single film take, measured at 405.85 kilograms of TNT equivalent, surpassing the previous record held by No Time to Die.

A teaser trailer for the film was released in February 2026. The film had a red-carpet premiere in Cairo on 22 May 2026 ahead of its release in Arab countries on 27 May. The initial release plan covered more than 600 cinemas in Egypt, Saudi Arabia, the United Arab Emirates, Kuwait, Bahrain and Oman. It was also theatrically released in India on 21 August, in English and Hindi languages.

== Reception ==
=== Box office ===
During its opening weekend from 28 to 31 May 2026, 7 Dogs grossed more than $7 million across the Middle East and North Africa. Saudi Arabia accounted for more than 200,000 tickets sold, followed by Egypt with more than 720,000 and the United Arab Emirates with roughly 87,000. Iraq, Kuwait, Bahrain, Oman, Jordan and Lebanon contributed a further 91,000 ticket sales.

In Egypt, the film earned EGP 131.4 million from 912,300 tickets sold during its first week. The figure was reported as a new Egyptian box-office record.

=== Critical response ===
Saeed Saeed of The National gave the film 3 out of 5 stars. He described it as an Arabic action film shaped by the style of Hollywood action blockbusters, and wrote that its main strength was its use of regional performers and production infrastructure rather than narrative originality. Moataz Al-Shafei of Sayidaty reviewed the film positively, praising its visual spectacle, action staging, use of Riyadh studio sets, and the contrast between Karim Abdel Aziz's restrained performance and Ahmed Ezz's more physical role.
