= Rebel (2022 film) =

2022 film directed by Adil El Arbi and Bilall Fallah

- Film poster
- Directed by: Adil El Arbi; Bilall Fallah
- Written by: Adil El Arbi; Bilall Fallah; Kevin Meul; Jan van Dyck
- Produced by: Bert Hamelinck; Dimitri Verbeeck
- Cinematography: Robrecht Heyvaert
- Edited by: Frédéric Thoraval
- Music by: Hannes De Maeyer
- Distributed by: BAC Films; Wild Bunch
- Release dates: 26 May 2022 (Cannes); 31 August 2022 (France); 5 October 2022 (Belgium)
- Running time: 135 minutes
- Countries: Belgium; France; Luxembourg
- Languages: Arabic; French; Dutch
- Box office: $173,121

Rebel is a 2022 drama film written and directed by Adil El Arbi and Bilall Fallah. The film stars Aboubakr Bensaihi, Lubna Azabal, Amir El Arbi, Tara Abboud, and Younes Bouab. It focuses on the portrayal of a Muslim family torn apart over the future of its youngest member.

The film had its world premiere at the 2022 Cannes Film Festival on 26 May 2022, and was released in France on 31 August 2022, and in Belgium on 5 October 2022, by BAC Films and Wild Bunch. At the 12th Magritte Awards, Rebel received four nominations, including Best Actor and Best Actress for Bensaihi and Azabal, respectively.

== Plot ==
Kamal Wasaki is a young Belgian rapper of Moroccan origin. He decided to go to Raqqa in Syria as a volunteer to help the victims of the war. His family stayed in Molenbeek. Nassim, Kamal's younger brother, is very influenced by his older brother and wants to join him. The youngster is then approached by an ISIS recruiter. Leïla, Kamal and Nassim's mother, tries to save her young son. Kamal, on the other hand, is caught in the middle of a conflict and has to join an armed group against his will.

== Cast ==
- Aboubakr Bensaihi as Kamal Wasaki
- Lubna Azabal as Leila Wasaki
- Amir El Arbi as Nassim Wasaki
- Tara Abboud as Noor
- Younes Bouab as Abu Amar
- Kamal Moummad as Imam Yusuf

== Accolades ==
Award / Film Festival	Category	Recipients and nominees	Result
Ensor Awards	Best Film		Nominated
Ensor Awards	Outstanding Performance in a Leading Role	Aboubakr Bensaihi	Nominated
Ensor Awards	Best Director	Adil El Arbi, Bilall Fallah	Nominated
Ensor Awards	Best Cinematography	Robrecht Heyvaert	Nominated
Ensor Awards	Best Editing	Frédéric Thoraval	Nominated
Ensor Awards	Best Production Design	Pepijn Van Looy	Nominated
Ensor Awards	Best Costume Design	Mathilde De Wit, Uli Simon	Nominated
Ensor Awards	Best Makeup	Evie Hamels, Veronique Dubray, Nathalie De Hen	Nominated
Ensor Awards	Best Screenplay	Adil El Arbi, Bilall Fallah, Kevin Meul, Jan van Dyck	Nominated
Ensor Awards	Best Original Score	Hannes De Maeyer, Oum, Aboubakr Bensaihi	Nominated
Ensor Awards	Best Sound	Guilhem Donzel, Jamie Baksht, Jeroen Truijens, et al.	Nominated
Magritte Awards	Best Flemish Film		Nominated
Magritte Awards	Best Actor	Aboubakr Bensaihi	Nominated
Magritte Awards	Best Actress	Lubna Azabal	Nominated
Magritte Awards	Best Original Score	Hannes De Maeyer, Oum, Aboubakr Bensaihi	Won
Philadelphia Film Festival	Jury Prize		Won
BCN Film Fest	Best Film		Won
