= 15th Ensor Awards =

Flemish film awards

Gala of the Ensors
- Date: 7 February 2025

Highlights
- Best Picture: SKUNK
- Most nominations: Holy Rosita

The 15th Ensor Awards, presented by the Ensor Academy, took place on 7 February 2025 at the end of the Ostend Film Festival during the Gala of the Ensors to honor Flemish films and TV of 2024. The film Julie Keeps Quiet won five awards and SKUNK won best picture. Holy Rosita was nominated 5 times.

== Winners and nominees ==
=== Film Awards ===
Winners are listed first, highlighted in boldface, and indicated with a double dagger (‡).

**Best Film**: **SKUNK**‡; I Love Life; Julie Keeps Quiet; Holy Rosita; Why Wettelen?	**Best Direction**: **Leonardo Van Dijl – Julie Keeps Quiet**‡; Wannes Destoop – Holy Rosita; Koen Mortier – SKUNK; Mathias Sercu – I Love Life; Christina Vandekerckhove – Milano
**Best Performance in a Lead Role**: **Daphne Agten – Holy Rosita**‡; Janne Desmet – I Love Life; Thibaud Dooms – SKUNK; Matteo Simoni – Milano; Tessa Van den Broeck – Julie Keeps Quiet	**Best Performance in a Supporting Role**: **Mieke De Groote – Holy Rosita**‡; Ruth Becquart – Julie Keeps Quiet; Jan Bijvoet – The Magnet Man; Sarah Vandeursen – SKUNK; Greet Verstraete – J'Aime La Vie
**Best Screenplay**: **Leonardo van Dijl, Ruth Becquart – Julie Keeps Quiet**‡; Koen Mortier – SKUK; Mathias Sercu – I Love Life; Christina Vandekerckhove – Milano; Wannes Destoop, Janne Desmet, Tom Dupont – Holy Rosita	**Best Editing**: **Thomas Pooters, Nico Poedts, Stijn Deconinck, Koen Timmerman, Pieter Smet – Moresnet**‡; Tom Denoyette – Holy Rosita; Bert Jacobs – Julie Keeps Quiet; Philippe Ravoet – J'aime la vie; Manu Van Hove – SKUNK
**Best Director of Photography (DOP)**: **Nicolas Karakatsanis – Julie Keeps Quiet**‡; Dries Delputte – Holy Rosita; Diego Dezuttere – STYX; Nicolas Karakatsanis – SKUNK; David Williamson – The Magnet Man	**Best Makeup**: **Evalotte Oosterop – SKUNK**‡; Michelle Beeckman – Julie Keeps Quiet; Dorien Van Poucke – Holy Rosita; Dorien Van Poucke – Uncles (Season 2); Pur Thijs, Rob Hillenbrink – STYX
**Best Costume Design**: **Ellen Blereau – Julie Keeps Quiet**‡; Hilde Destoop – Holy Rosita; Oemer Khan – Chameleon; Bho Roosterman – Moresnet; Tine Verbeurgt – STYX	**Best Art Direction**: **Toon Mariën – Holy Rosita**‡; Julien Denis – Julie Keeps Quiet; Geert Paredis, Florian Legters – Moresnet; Geert Paredis – SKUNK; Natalia Trevino – The Magnet Man
**Best Sound**: **Arne Winderickx, Boris Debackere, Gustaf Berger – Julie Keeps Quiet**‡; Dirk Bombey, Jan Schermer – Milano; Bart Martens, Raf Ferlin – Chameleon; Leo Franssen, Nardi van Dijk, Jos van Galen – Moresnet; Arne Winderickx, Arnout Colaert, Matthias Hillegeer – Holy Rosita	**Best Music**: **David Martijn – Holy Rosita**‡; Amenra – SKUNK; Caroline Shaw – Julie Keeps Quiet; Peter Vermeersch – Why Wettelen?; Will Michiels, Mounir Hathout, Eddy Addai – Chameleon
**Best Documentary Film**: **Soundtrack to a Coup d'Etat**‡; Kamai; Marching In the Dark; Paradigm; Yalla, Baba!	**Best Short Film**: **Upper- Lennert Madou**‡; The Golden Donkey - Anne Verbeure; A gentle gesture - Ann-Julie Vervaeke; Friday, 1st of July - Sarah Lederman; My Land Is Burned - Abdulrahman Alshowaiki
**Best Youth Fiction**: **Hawa & Adam**‡; AYO Skate; The Hoppers (Season 2); The Council of Soekie; OTIS Skate	**Best Animation**: **Bad Bad Belgium**‡; Farmer (Season 2); The Reading Club; Dikkie Dik and the Missing Cuddly Toy; Fox & Hare Save the Forest
**The Box Office Prize**: **Holy Rosita**‡; The Magnet Man; I Love Life; Julie Keeps Quiet; SKUNK; The Last Front; Why Wettelen?	**Telenet Audience Award**: **Holy Rosita**‡; The Magnet Man; I Love Life; Julie Keeps Quiet; SKUNK; The Last Front; Why Wettelen?
**Lifetime Achievement Award**: **Guido Henderickx (posthumous)**‡

=== TV Awards ===
**Best Fiction – Series**: **Moresnet**‡; Chantal (Season 2); Chameleon; Uncles (Season 2); STYX	**Best Direction TV-Series**: **Frank Van Passel – Moresnet**‡; Anke Blondé – Juliet; Jeroen Dumoulein – STYX; Jelle Gordyn – Uncles (Season 2); Safi Graauw, Michael Abay – Chameleon
**Best Actor in a Leading Role (Fiction Series)**: **Isabelle Van Hecke – Uncles (Season 2)**‡; Maaike Cafmeyer – Chantal (Season 2); Charlotte De Bruyne – Juliet; Noa Tambwe Kabati – Chameleon; Boris Van Severen – Moresnet	**Best Supporting Actor (Fiction Series)**: **Greg Timmermans – Assizes: The Insulin Murder**‡; Pierre Bokma – Moresnet; Joke Emmers – Billie vs Benjamin (Season 2); Dries Heyneman – Chantal (Season 2); Anemone Valcke – STYX
**Best Screenplay (Fiction Series)**: **Jelle De Beule, Floris Schillebeeckx – Uncles (Season 2)**‡; Jef Hoogmartens – Moresnet; Michel Sabbe – STYX; Mathias Sercu – Chantal (Season 2); Juliet'	**Best Documentary Series**: **They Them We**‡; If You Only Knew (Season 4); Draw For Change; The Vatican - The State of the Church; What no one sees
