= Doug Belgrad =

American film and television producer

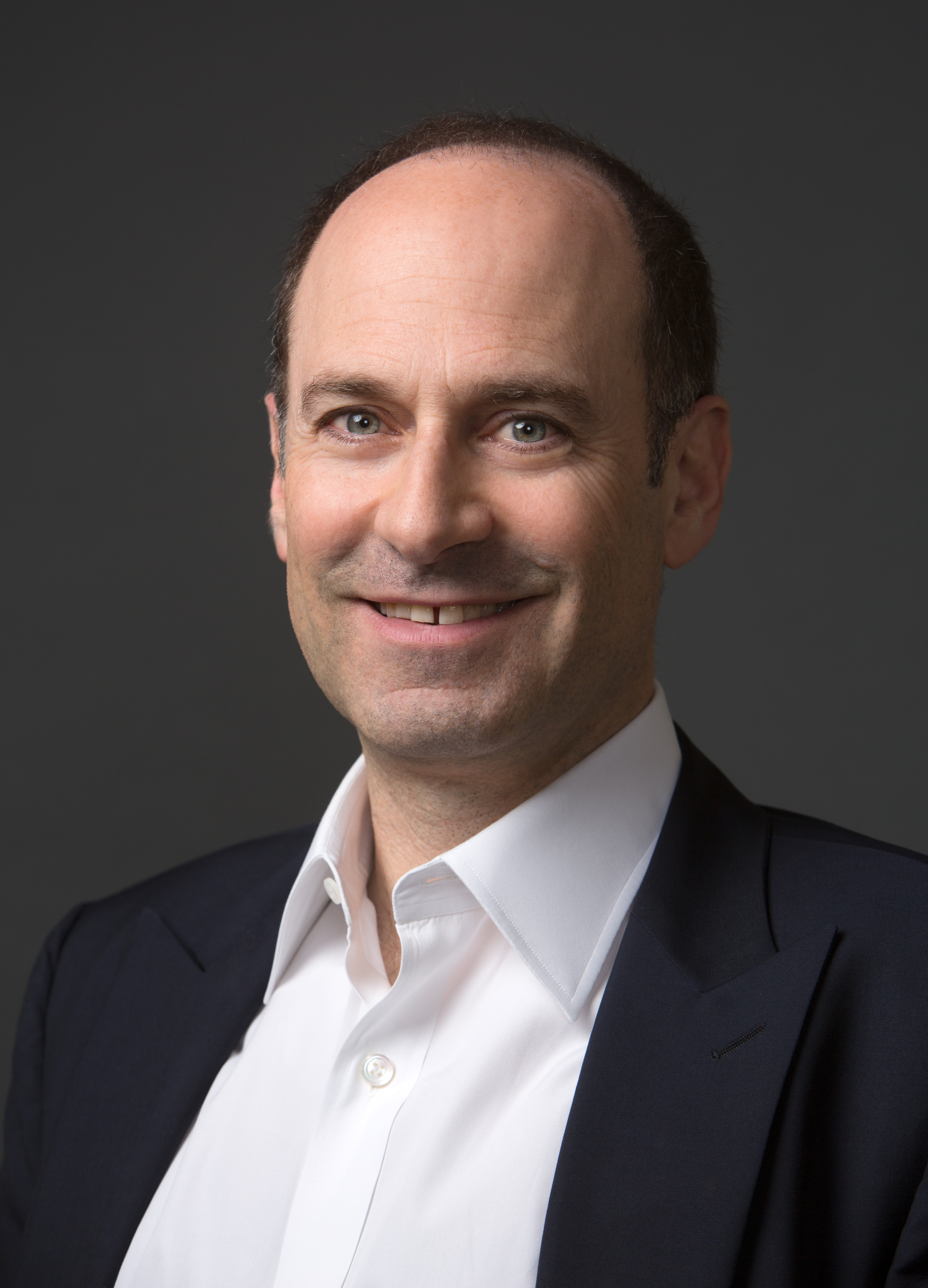
- Belgrad in 2015
- Occupations: Vice president of film, Netflix
- Notable work: Men in Black, Bad Boys, The Social Network, Zero Dark Thirty, Gran Turismo

Doug Belgrad is an American film and television producer. He was previously an executive at Sony Pictures for nearly 27 years before founding 2.0 Entertainment, a film and television production and co-financing company based at Sony. He is known for supervising films such as Men in Black and Bad Boys for Sony Pictures.

== Early life ==
Belgrad was raised in Highland Park, Illinois. His father owned and operated a furniture manufacturing business founded by his grandfather. He graduated from the University of Pennsylvania in 1987 with a bachelor's degree in history. He began his career at Kidder, Peabody & Company as a securities analyst, specializing in media and entertainment companies, before joining Columbia Pictures in 1989.

== Career ==
=== Sony Pictures ===
In 2008, he was named co-president of production at Sony Pictures Entertainment with Matt Tolmach. In 2010, Tolmach left Sony Pictures Entertainment and Belgrad was named as sole president of the studio. Belgrad worked on The Karate Kid, which was the second co-production between a Hollywood studio and a Chinese studio, and the first shot entirely on the mainland. In June 2016, it was announced that Belgrad would be leaving Sony to move into a producing role.

=== 2.0 Entertainment ===
Under the 2.0 Entertainment banner, Belgrad produces and co-finances a number of Sony films, including Peter Rabbit (2018).

2.0 is building a television production arm, with projects including L.A.'s Finest, starring Jessica Alba and Gabrielle Union.

== Filmography ==
Producer

- Charlie's Angels (2019)
- Bad Boys for Life (2020)
- The Pope's Exorcist (2023)
- Gran Turismo (2023)
- Bad Boys: Ride or Die (2024)

Executive producer

- Peter Rabbit (2018)
- Zombieland: Double Tap (2019)
- L.A.'s Finest (2019–2020)
- Peter Rabbit 2: The Runaway (2021)
- Love Again (2023)
