= Wil (film) =

- Directed by: Tim Mielants
- Written by: Jeroen Olyslaegers; Tim Mielants; Carl Joos
- Based on: Wil by Jeroen Olyslaegers
- Starring: Stef Aerts; Matteo Simoni; Annelore Crollet
- Cinematography: Robrecht Heyvaert
- Release date: September 27, 2023 (Belgium)
- Running time: 110 minutes
- Countries: Belgium; Netherlands; Poland
- Languages: Flemish; German; French

Wil is a 2023 Belgian Dutch Polish historical war drama film written by Carl Joos, Tim Mielants and Jeroen Olyslaegers, directed by Mielants and starring Stef Aerts, Matteo Simoni and Annelore Crollet. It is based on Jeroen Olyslaegers’ novel of the same title.

== Plot ==
Will unfolds in 1942 Nazi-occupied Antwerp, as part of the Holocaust in Belgium. Wilfried "Will" Wils (Stef Aerts) and his colleague, Lode Metdepenningen (Matteo Simoni), begin their roles as auxiliary police officers under German oversight. Their commanding officer, Jean, bluntly advises them: “Stand aside and don't interfere” with German orders.

On their first patrol, they are ordered by a German Feldgendarm to arrest a Jewish family. Hesitant but powerless to resist, they follow the soldier. However, when the Feldgendarm begins assaulting a mother and child, Will and Lode intervene. In the ensuing struggle, the soldier accidentally dies when Will strikes him with an iron rod. Their decision to hide the body in a manhole marks their unwitting entry into peril.

In the aftermath, panic and paranoia seize Antwerp. Will seeks help from Felix Verschaffel, a collaborator claiming German connections, while Lode's sister Yvette (Annelore Crollet) grows increasingly distrustful of Will's loyalties.

Under growing moral pressure, Will joins forces with Lode, Yvette, and the local resistance to protect the Jewish family they initially encountered—hiding them in the home of Chaim Litzke (Pierre Bokma).

As German investigations intensify—led by officer Gregor Schnabel—Will manipulates information to misdirect a raid. When the raid happens, Yvette watches from a distance as Will is told to help load men women and children onto waiting trucks. He hesitates yet ultimately Will begins to help load the trucks to Yvette's horror. Will chases after a distraught Yvette where he sees her kill herself by stepping in front of a train.

The film concludes in a conflicted, resolute silence: Will survives, having done both good and wrong, forever shadowed by wartime compromises.

== Cast ==
- Stef Aerts as Wilfried Wils
- Matteo Simoni as Lode Metdepenningen
- Annelore Crollet as Yvette Metdepenningen
- Gene Bervoets as Omer Verschueren
- Jan Bijvoet as Jean
- Pierre Bokma as Chaim Litzke
- Dimitrij Schaad as SS-Obersturmführer Gregor Schnabel
- Pit Bukowski as Feldgendarm Hermann
- Koen De Bouw as Father Metdepenningen
- Jan Decleir as The Professor
- Sofie Decleir as Jenny
- Valentijn Dhaenens as Gust
- Els Dottermans as Maria Metdepenningen
- Wito Geerts as Sus
- Kevin Janssens as Vincent Vindevogel
- Marc Lauwrys as Gaston
- Frieda Pittoors as Zulma
- Dirk Roofthooft as Felix Verschaffel
- Ariane Van Vliet as Roza Wils

== Release ==
The film was released in Belgian theaters on September 27, 2023.

== Reception ==
The film has a 75% rating on Rotten Tomatoes based on 8 reviews. Barbara Schulgasser-Parker of Common Sense Media awarded the film three stars out of five.

Oli Welsh of Polygon gave the film a negative review and wrote, “It's clear-sighted on the cruel compromises of occupation and collaboration, but so fatalistic about them that it winds up wallowing in its own guilt and hopelessness. That's a dark kind of truth, and not necessarily one that anyone needs to hear.”

John Serba of Decider.com gave the film a positive review and wrote that it “wisely tells an absorbing small-scale story that keenly represents the big-picture conflict.”
