= Martha Canga Antonio =

- Born: Martha Canga Antonio; June 12, 1995 (age 31); Mons, Belgium
- Other name: Martha Da’ro
- Occupations: Actress, singer
- Years active: 2015–present
- Musical career
- Genres: Soul; Rhythm and blues
- Instrument: Vocals
- Years active: 2016–present

Martha Canga Antonio (born June 12 1995), is a Belgian actress and singer of Angolan descent. She is best known for the critically acclaimed film Black.

== Early life and education ==
Martha Canga Antonio was born on June 12 1995 in Mons, Belgium, to parents who had immigrated from Angola. She grew up in Liège.

In 2014, she studied communication management at Erasmus Brussels University of Applied Sciences and Arts in Brussels.

== Acting career ==
While still studying, Antonio was selected to play the character Mavela in the gang thriller film Black directed by Adil El Arbi and Bilall Fallah. Before the film, she had no acting experience but was selected out of 450 candidates. The film and her role in it became highly popular and critically acclaimed.

The film was later screened different international film festivals. In November 2015, Antonio was adjudged the Best Actress at the Tallinn Black Nights Film Festival. In December of the same year, she was nominated as a European Shooting Star at the 7th Magritte Awards for the same film.

== Music career ==
Apart from acting, Antonio is also a prolific singer who started her career as a member of the musical group Soul'Art. In 2018, she started her career as a solo singer under the name "Martha Da'ro", and released the single Summer Blues.

== Filmography ==
Year	Film	Role	Notes
2015	Black	Mavela	Nominated—Magritte Award for Most Promising Actress
2017	La Forêt	Maya Musso	TV series
2018	A Girl from Mogadishu	Amala	
2018	Over Water	Ticha	TV series
2019	Baptiste	Lina	TV series
2019	Adoration	Jeanne	
2019	Cleo	Myra	
2023	Lupin	Fleur	TV series
2023	Time Out	Lucille	

== See also ==
- Shooting Stars Award
