= Disorder (2015 film) =

2015 film

- Film poster
- Directed by: Alice Winocour
- Written by: Alice Winocour; Jean-Stéphane Bron
- Produced by: Isabelle Madelaine; Emilie Tisné
- Starring: Matthias Schoenaerts; Diane Kruger
- Cinematography: Georges Lechaptois
- Edited by: Julien Lacheray
- Music by: Gesaffelstein
- Production companies: Dharamsala; Darius Films
- Distributed by: Mars Distribution
- Release dates: 16 May 2015 (Cannes); 30 September 2015 (France and Belgium)
- Running time: 100 minutes
- Countries: France; Belgium
- Language: French
- Budget: $5.2 million
- Box office: $460.997

Disorder (French: Maryland) is a 2015 French-Belgian co-production neo-noir thriller film directed by Alice Winocour about a home invasion, starring Matthias Schoenaerts as an ex-soldier with PTSD. It was screened in competition in the Un Certain Regard section at the 2015 Cannes Film Festival.

== Plot ==
Vincent (Matthias Schoenaerts) is an ex-soldier suffering from post-traumatic stress disorder (PTSD) after returning from Afghanistan. He is hired to protect the wife of a wealthy businessman while he's out of town, at their luxurious villa, Maryland, on the French Riviera.

== Cast ==
- Matthias Schoenaerts as Vincent
- Diane Kruger as Jessie
- Paul Hamy as Denis
- Zaïd Errougui-Demonsant as Ali
- Percy Kemp as Imad Whalid
- Mickaël Daubert as Kévin
- Franck Torrecillas as Franck

== Production ==
On 1 October 2014, Deadline reported that Matthias Schoenaerts and Diane Kruger would co-star in the film directed by Alice Winocour.

Filming began on the French Riviera on 15 October 2014. Most of the film takes place in the Domaine la Dilecta at the Cape of Antibes. The beach scenes were shot at the Plage de Passable in Saint-Jean-Cap-Ferrat. A car chase scene was shot in Col d'Èze on 14 November 2014. Production was completed on 11 December 2014.

== Release ==
Disorder premiered at the 2015 Cannes Film Festival in the Un Certain Regard section on 16 May 2015, and was released in France and Belgium on 30 September 2015. Sundance Selects bought the film three days after its Cannes premiere. The film was screened in the Gala Presentations section of the 2015 Toronto International Film Festival.

A trailer was released on 25 July 2015, and the poster was released on 30 July 2015.

== Reception ==
Disorder received generally positive reviews from critics, especially for Matthias Schoenaerts' performance. On Rotten Tomatoes, the film has a rating of 73%, based on 80 reviews, with an average rating of 6.4/10. The website's critical consensus states, "Well-acted and solidly crafted, Disorder (Maryland) relies on patiently established slow-burning tension to set the stage for an intelligent, intimate psychological thriller." On Metacritic, the film has a score of 66 out of 100, based on 22 critics, indicating "generally favorable reviews".

Variety's critic Guy Lodge wrote:

Disorder marks a crackling return to the sensitive-thug persona with which Schoenaerts made his name in Bullhead and Rust and Bone. Hulkingly built, buzz-cut and stamped with stark tattoos, he cuts a more baleful figure than the average buffed-up leading man, which suits Winocour's purposes just fine: As Vincent, an Afghanistan veteran prone to volatile paranoid episodes, he's a hero who nonetheless seems capable of turning on his charges (and, by extension, the audience) at any given moment. Post-traumatic stress disorder has been a heavily worked character condition in recent cinema, but Schoenaerts enacts it with bracing spareness, his nerve ends prickling through even in benign domestic exchanges.

Writing for Empire, Kim Newman gave the film 4 out of 5 stars, writing that "Director-writer Alice Winocour’s simmering thriller/character study is like a Transporter film directed by Chantal Akerman, with superb work from Matthias Schoenaerts as a buttoned-down, paranoid ex-soldier who senses evil forces in every shadow…"

=== Accolades ===
Award / Film Festival	Category	Recipients and nominees	Result
Cannes Film Festival	Prix Un Certain Regard	Alice Winocour	Nominated
AFI Fest	Special Jury Mention for Direction	Alice Winocour	Won
Lumière Awards	Best Music	Gesaffelstein	Nominated

== Soundtrack ==
Mike Lévy, better known as Gesaffelstein, produced a full-length musical score for this film. The soundtrack was released on 24 September 2015, as a limited release of 1,000 copies.

== Remake ==
On 15 September 2016, Deadline reported that Taylor Sheridan had been hired by Sony Pictures and Escape Artists to script the American remake of Disorder. Escape Artists’ Todd Black, Jason Blumenthal, Steve Tisch and Tony Shaw were said to be producing the remake and David Beaubaire overseeing it for the studio. James Mangold was named as the director.

== See also ==
- List of films featuring home invasions
- List of films featuring mental disorders
