= Bad Boys for Life =

2020 film directed by Adil & Bilall

- Theatrical release poster
- Directed by: Adil El Arbi Bilall Fallah
- Screenplay by: Chris Bremner; Peter Craig; Joe Carnahan
- Story by: Peter Craig; Joe Carnahan
- Based on: Characters by George Gallo
- Produced by: Jerry Bruckheimer; Will Smith; Doug Belgrad
- Starring: Will Smith; Martin Lawrence; Vanessa Hudgens; Alexander Ludwig; Paola Núñez; Charles Melton; Kate del Castillo; Nicky Jam; Joe Pantoliano
- Cinematography: Robrecht Heyvaert
- Edited by: Dan Lebental; Peter McNulty
- Music by: Lorne Balfe
- Production companies: Columbia Pictures; 2.0 Entertainment; Don Simpson/Jerry Bruckheimer Films (Note: Jerry Bruckheimer Films used the Don Simpson/Jerry Bruckheimer Films logo in memory of Don Simpson, who co-produced the first film. This was also the case for Top Gun: Maverick, where Simpson also co-produced the first Top Gun film as well as the second Bad Boys film.); Overbrook Entertainment
- Distributed by: Sony Pictures Releasing
- Release date: January 17, 2020
- Running time: 124 minutes
- Country: United States
- Language: English
- Budget: $90 million
- Box office: $426.5 million

Bad Boys for Life is a 2020 American buddy cop action comedy film that is the sequel to Bad Boys II (2003) and the third installment in the Bad Boys franchise. Will Smith and Martin Lawrence reprise their starring roles in the film, which is directed by Adil El Arbi and Bilall Fallah and produced by Smith, Jerry Bruckheimer, and Doug Belgrad, from a screenplay written by Chris Bremner, Peter Craig, and Joe Carnahan, and a story by Craig and Carnahan. Theresa Randle and Joe Pantoliano also reprise previous roles and are joined by Vanessa Hudgens, Alexander Ludwig, Paola Núñez, Charles Melton, Kate del Castillo, and Nicky Jam. In the film, Miami detectives Mike Lowrey and Marcus Burnett investigate a string of murders tied to Lowrey's troubled past.

A third Bad Boys film was contemplated following the release of the second film in 2003, with Michael Bay stating he would be interested in returning to direct, but budgetary constraints led to stalled efforts. Over the years, a variety of writers and directors were attached as the film went through multiple attempts to enter production. The project was eventually finalized and green-lit in October 2018, and filming began the following year, lasting from January to June 2019. Principal photography took place in Atlanta, Miami, and Mexico City.

Bad Boys for Life was theatrically released in the United States on January 17, 2020, by Sony Pictures Releasing. The film was generally well received by critics and grossed $426.5 million worldwide, becoming the third-highest-grossing January release of all time. It was also the highest-grossing film of the year domestically in the United States, the fourth-highest-grossing film of 2020 and the highest-grossing film in the franchise. A sequel, Bad Boys: Ride or Die, was released on June 7, 2024.

== Plot ==
Seventeen years after Johnny Tapia was taken down by Miami PD Detectives Mike Lowrey and Marcus Burnett, (Note: As depicted in Bad Boys II (2003).) Isabel Aretas, widow of cartel kingpin Benito, escapes from a Mexican prison with the aid of her son Armando. Isabel sends Armando to Miami, tasking him with recovering a substantial stash of money Benito had hidden, as well as assassinating the people responsible for his arrest and eventual death in prison. Isabel also demands that Armando kill Mike last.

In Miami, Mike accompanies Marcus to the birth of his first grandson. Marcus wants to spend more time with his family, so he tells Mike he intends to retire, to Mike's chagrin. During a footrace against Marcus to prove who is faster, Mike is shot by Armando and left in a coma for months. Chastised by Isabel for targeting Mike first, Armando continues to assassinate other targets on his list during Mike's convalescence.

Following Mike's recovery, he is determined to seek revenge and unsuccessfully attempts to recruit the now-retired Marcus, which causes them to fall out. An informant gives Mike the identity of arms dealer Booker Grassie. Realizing that Mike will not heed orders to avoid the investigation, Captain Conrad Howard reluctantly allows him to work with the tech-driven team in charge, Advanced Miami Metro Operations (AMMO), led by Mike's ex-girlfriend, Lieutenant Rita Secada.

While the team surveils Grassie at an arms deal, Mike intervenes after determining the buyers intend to kill Grassie, but he fails to save him. Later, Marcus is called by Carver Remy, an old informant who believes the assassin is after him. Marcus and Mike visit Carver, but he is killed as they arrive. Armando escapes after a fistfight with Mike.

Captain Howard later reveals his intentions to retire, advising Mike that he needs to find a path forward in life. Moments later he is assassinated by Armando. The captain's abrupt death pulls Marcus out of retirement, but he convinces Mike to work as a team with AMMO. They track down Grassie's accountant, who leads them to Lorenzo "Zway-Lo" Rodriguez. Infiltrating Zway-Lo's birthday party leads to a destructive car chase. Armando arrives in a helicopter to rescue Zway-Lo but kills him when he blocks Armando's way to shoot Mike. As he lines up a shot, Armando tells Mike "Hasta el fuego". Gunfire from Marcus creates cover for Mike, who falls into the ocean below.

AMMO is shut down because of the failed operation. In private, Mike reveals to Marcus that Armando may be his son. He explains that, twenty-five years earlier, before partnering with Marcus, Mike worked undercover in the Aretas cartel where he met Isabel. They fell in love and intended to run away together, using "Hasta el fuego" as a made-up secret catchphrase. Mike ultimately remained loyal to the police, realizing how dangerous Isabel would become. Despite Mike's opposition, Marcus and AMMO join him in Mexico City to confront her.

At the abandoned hotel, Mike meets Isabel and scolds her for concealing the truth from him. A shootout quickly ensues between AMMO and Isabel's men. Marcus shoots the pilot of Isabel's escape helicopter, causing it to crash and start a fire. Marcus confronts Isabel, while Mike tells the truth to Armando. In a fit of rage, Armando beats on Mike, who refuses to retaliate. Armando then demands the truth from Isabel, who confirms that Mike is his real father.

Realizing the task he spent a lifetime training for was a bluff, Armando tries to reason with Isabel, leading to her inadvertently shooting him while aiming for Mike. Enraged, Isabel attempts to shoot Mike again, but Rita shoots her, and she falls to her death into the flames below.

Sometime later, Rita is promoted to Captain, while Mike and Marcus are placed in charge of AMMO. Mike visits a remorseful Armando in prison and offers him a chance to earn some redemption on a new case, which he accepts gratefully.

== Cast ==
- Will Smith as Detective Lieutenant Michael Eugene 'Mike' Lowrey, Marcus' partner/best friend.
- Martin Lawrence as Detective Lieutenant Marcus Miles Burnett, Mike's partner/best friend.
- Vanessa Hudgens as Kelly, weapons expert of AMMO
- Alexander Ludwig as Dorn, tech expert of AMMO
- Paola Núñez as Lieutenant Rita Secada, head of Miami Police unit AMMO and Mike's ex-girlfriend.
- Jacob Scipio as Armando Aretas, Isabel's son
- Charles Melton as Rafe, member of AMMO
- Kate del Castillo as Isabel 'La Bruja' Aretas, Mike's ex-lover and Armando's mother
- Nicky Jam as Lorenzo 'Zway-Lo' Rodríguez
- Joe Pantoliano as Captain Conrad Howard
- Theresa Randle as Theresa Burnett, Marcus' wife
- Massi Furlan as Lee Taglin
- Happy Anderson as Jenkins
- Dennis Greene as Reggie Norman, Megan's husband
- Bianca Bethune as Megan Burnett, Marcus and Theresa's daughter
- Michael Bay as Wedding M.C.
- DJ Khaled as Manny the Butcher
- Rory Markham as Booker Grassie
- Ivo Nandi as Carver Remy

== Production ==
=== Development ===
Michael Bay, the director of the first two Bad Boys films, stated in June 2008 that he might direct Bad Boys 3, but that the greatest obstacle would be cost considering both Will Smith and himself demanded some of the highest salaries in the film industry. By August 2009, Columbia Pictures had hired Peter Craig to write a script for the sequel. In February 2011, Martin Lawrence stated that the film was in development.

Following several delays, Jerry Bruckheimer announced in June 2014 that screenwriter David Guggenheim was working on the storyline for the sequel. Two months later, Lawrence said a script had been written and roles had been cast. The following year in June 2015, it was reported that director Joe Carnahan was in early talks to write and possibly direct the film. Sony Pictures Entertainment announced a short time later in August 2015 that there were plans for two sequels, with Bad Boys 3 scheduled for release on February 17, 2017, followed by Bad Boys 4 on July 3, 2019. In early 2016, Bad Boys 3 was pushed to June 2, 2017, with no update on the release date of Bad Boys 4. Producers had planned to begin production in early 2017. Another delay surfaced in August 2016, when, to avoid competition with the upcoming DC Comics film Wonder Woman, the studio pushed the film's release to January 12, 2018. It was also revealed that the film would be titled Bad Boys for Life. In an October 2016 interview on Jimmy Kimmel Live!, Lawrence said filming might begin in March 2017. In December 2016, an updated release date for Bad Boys 4 was set for May 24, 2019.

Sony announced in February 2017 that the film's release would be delayed for a third time to November 9, 2018. The following month, Carnahan left the movie due to scheduling conflicts. In August 2017, Sony removed the third film from their release schedule, and later in the month Lawrence said the film would not happen.

Planning resumed in February 2018 as Belgian directors Adil El Arbi and Bilall Fallah were signed, after development on Beverly Hills Cop IV stalled, in place of Carnahan, and Smith and Lawrence were confirmed to reprise. Geek Worldwide reported that the third installment in the Bad Boys franchise would film from November 2018 to March 2019 in Miami and Atlanta, with the release date scheduled for January 17, 2020.

=== Casting ===
In October 2018, Variety revealed that Sony was close to green-lighting the film's production. It was reported in December 2018 that Joe Pantoliano would reprise his role as Captain Howard from the previous films. Kate del Castillo joined the cast in early 2019, and it reported soon after Theresa Randle would reprise her role as Marcus' wife, Theresa, marking her first film appearance in 10 years.

=== Filming ===
Principal photography began on January 14, 2019, in downtown Atlanta. Shooting also took place in Mexico City and State of Mexico in April 2019, as well as in Miami, wrapping on June 7, 2019. Cinematographer Robrecht Heyvaert shot the film with Sony CineAlta VENICE digital cameras and Panavision Primo, G- and T-Series anamorphic lenses.

=== Music ===
The film was composed by Lorne Balfe, whose new music was integrated with Mark Mancina's themes from the first film. Both trailers for the film include a remix/mashup of "Bad Boys" by Inner Circle (the franchise's theme) and "Bad Boy for Life" by P. Diddy, Black Rob and Mark Curry.

The official soundtrack album to the film, Bad Boys for Life: The Soundtrack was announced by its executive producer, DJ Khaled, and released on the same day as the film. Black Eyed Peas and J Balvin recorded a song titled "Ritmo", released October 11, 2019, which served as a lead single for the film's soundtrack.

The soundtrack also features tracks by many artists, including Nicky Jam, Quavo, Rick Ross, Meek Mill, Buju Banton, Bryson Tiller, City Girls, Pitbull, and DJ Durel.

== Release ==
=== Theatrical ===
The first official trailer for Bad Boys for Life debuted on September 4, 2019, and its second trailer was released two months later on November 5. Its world premiere was held at the TCL Chinese Theatre on January 14, 2020. Will Smith and Martin Lawrence arrived at the premiere driving a Porsche 911 Carrera 4S with the Bad Boys theme playing loudly from the car's audio system. Bad Boys for Life was theatrically released in the United States on January 17, 2020, by Sony Pictures Releasing.

=== Home media ===
Bad Boys for Life was released digitally in the United States and Canada through Premium VOD on March 31, 2020, before the end of the usual 90-day theatrical run. The film was released on 4K Ultra HD, Blu-ray, and DVD on April 21, 2020.

== Reception ==
=== Box office ===
Bad Boys for Life grossed $206.3 million in the United States and Canada, and $220.2 million in other territories, for a worldwide total of $426.5 million, against a production budget of $90 million. It is both the highest-grossing film in the Bad Boys franchise and the highest-grossing film released in January.

In the United States and Canada, the film was released alongside Dolittle, and was initially projected to gross $35–45 million from 3,740 theaters during its three-day opening weekend, for a total of around $48 million over the full four-day MLK weekend. After making $23.5 million on its first day (including $6.36 million from Thursday night previews), estimates were raised to $68 million for four days. The film went on to debut to $62.2 million in its first three days, and $73.4 million over four, the second-best opening for the holiday, behind American Sniper. It made $34 million in its second weekend and $17.7 million in its third, remaining in first place both times.

The film's release in China was delayed following the country's movie theater closures that began in January 2020 as a result of the COVID-19 pandemic. Bad Boys For Life was eventually released in China on August 14, 2020, grossing $3.2 million in its first weekend. After the easing of initial restrictions in the US, the film was released in three Santikos Theatres locations in San Antonio, Texas on May 1, 2020.

=== Critical response ===
IndieWire described reviews for Bad Boys for Life as "mostly positive", while Screen Rant stated the critics were "generally positive". The review aggregation website Rotten Tomatoes reported an approval rating of 76% based on 270 reviews, and an average rating of 6.2/10. The website's critics consensus reads: "Loaded up with action and a double helping of leading-man charisma, Bad Boys for Life reinvigorates this long-dormant franchise by playing squarely to its strengths." On Metacritic, the film has a weighted average score of 59 out of 100, based on 46 critics, indicating "mixed or average" reviews. Audiences polled by CinemaScore gave the film an average grade of "A" on an A+ to F scale, equivalent to the first two films. PostTrak reported an average rating of 4.5 out of 5 stars, with 73% of their respondents saying they would definitely recommend it.

Todd McCarthy of The Hollywood Reporter wrote that "the third time really is the charm," and added, "The two directors roll with ease between raucous comedy and raw drama, to considerable effect, just as they crank up the tension on any number of occasions, occasionally with palpably visceral impact." In a 2.5 out of 5 review, Michael O'Sullivan of The Washington Post explained that "Adil and Bilall... bring a breath of fresh air and fun energy to a franchise that felt somewhat stale, even 25 years ago, when the first film was likened, not inaccurately, to a carbon copy of Lethal Weapon." Radheyan Simonpillai of Now earned a 3 out of 5 rating, stating that "Bad Boys for Life's relationship to its predecessors becomes what The Irishman is to Goodfellas and Casino." David Ehrlich of IndieWire gave the film a "B" grade, calling it a "fun, explosive, and even thoughtful action movie," and wrote, "Bad Boys for Life doesn't aim to raise the bar on its genre or rewrite the blockbuster rulebook, but it's a blast watching Lawrence and Smith revisit these characters and find a sensible place for them in the current Hollywood landscape."

=== Accolades ===
Award	Category	Recipient	Result
BET Awards	Best Movie		Nominated
Critics' Choice Super Awards	Best Action Movie		Nominated
Critics' Choice Super Awards	Best Actor in an Action Movie	Will Smith	Nominated
NAACP Image Awards	Outstanding Motion Picture		Won
NAACP Image Awards	Outstanding Actor in a Motion Picture	Will Smith	Nominated
People's Choice Awards	Favorite Movie		Won
People's Choice Awards	Favorite Male Movie Star	Will Smith	Won
People's Choice Awards	Favorite Action Movie		Nominated
People's Choice Awards	Favorite Action Movie Star	Will Smith	Nominated
People's Choice Awards	Favorite Action Movie Star	Vanessa Hudgens	Nominated
People's Choice Awards	Favorite Female Movie Star	Vanessa Hudgens	Nominated
Saturn Awards	Best Action or Adventure Film		Nominated

== Sequel ==
Following the box office success of the third film, Smith and Lawrence announced that they would star in a fourth film, with Adil El Arbi and Bilall Fallah returning as directors and Bremner writing the script. The project was put on hold in light of the cancelled Batgirl film and the incident between Will Smith and Chris Rock at the 94th Academy Awards. However, the project was announced to be in development. Musician and disc jockey Ahmir "Questlove" Thompson announced that he backed out of a special appearance in the project, due to the later pre-production of the fourth film. Hudgens, Ludwig, and Núñez returned for their roles from the third film, while Tasha Smith replaced Randle for the role of Theresa Burnett, and John Salley also reprised his hacker role from the original 1995 film. Ioan Gruffudd and Rhea Seehorn joined the cast in undisclosed roles, along with Eric Dane in an undisclosed villain role. Although the filming location was revealed, principal photography filming was later put on hold due to the 2023 Hollywood labor disputes in July. The film was released in the United States on June 7, 2024.
