= Matteo Simoni =

Belgian actor (born 1987)

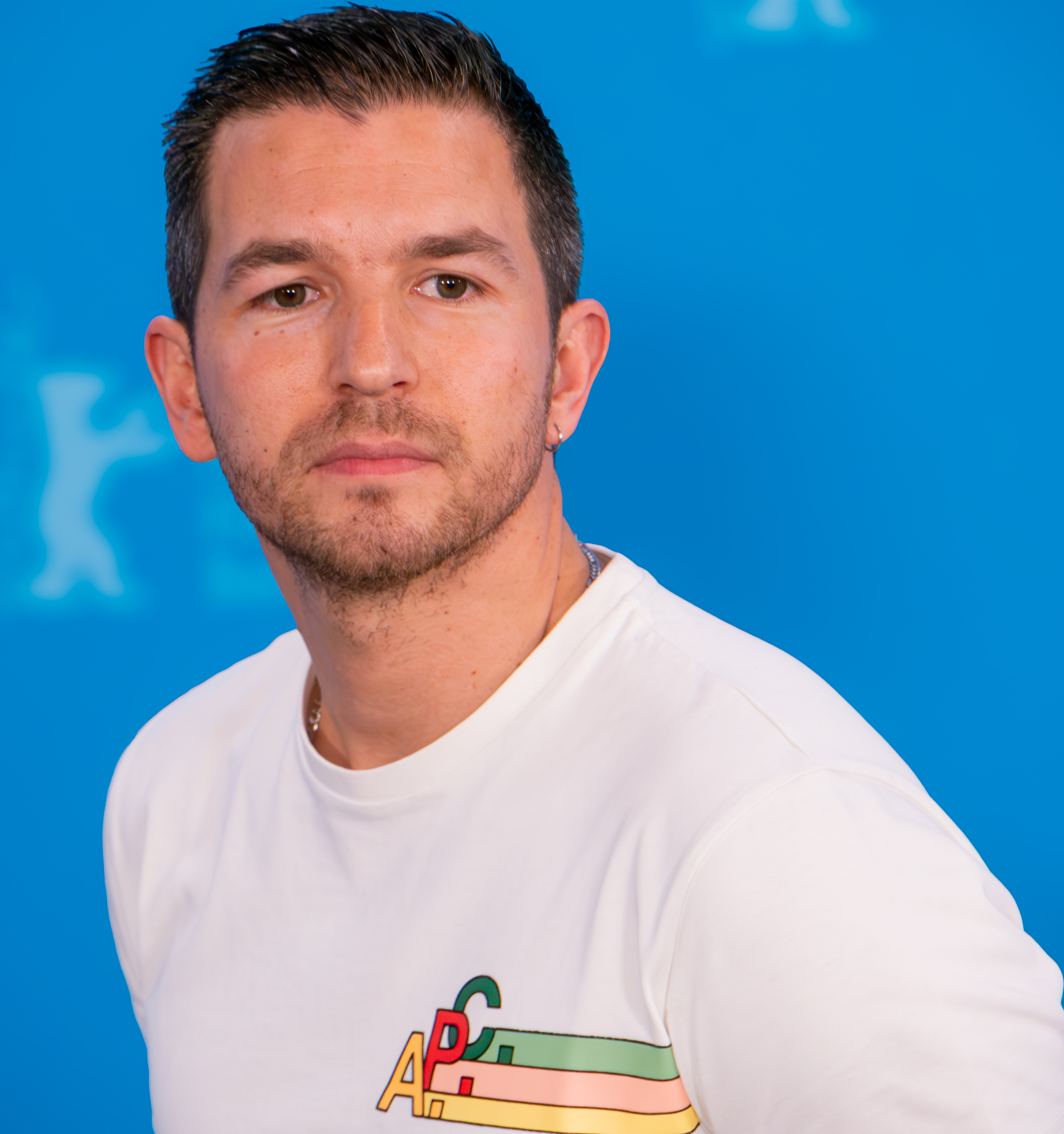
- Simoni in 2026
- Born: 3 September 1987 (age 38); Hasselt, Belgium
- Occupation: Actor
- Years active: 1989, 2004–present

Matteo Simoni (born 3 September 1987) is a Belgian actor. He starred in film such as Marina, The Racer, and Safety First: The Movie.

== Awards and nominations ==
Year	Award	Category	Nominated work	Result
2014	Ostend Film Festival	Best Actor	Marina	Nominated
2014	Vlaamse Televisie Sterren	Best Actor	Safety First	Won
2015	Magritte Awards	Most Promising Actor	Marina	Nominated
2015	Vlaamse Televisie Sterren	Best Actor	Amateurs, Safety First	Won
2017	Biarritz International Festival of Audiovisual Programming	TV series and Serials: Actor	Callboys	Won
2017	Vlaamse Televisie Sterren	Best Actor	Callboys	Won
2018	Berlin International Film Festival	Shooting Stars Award		Won
2023	Ensor Award	Best Supporting Actor	Zillion	Won
