= Bad Boys: Ride or Die =

2024 film by Adil & Bilall

- Theatrical release poster
- Directed by: Adil El Arbi Bilall Fallah
- Written by: Chris Bremner; Will Beall
- Based on: Characters by George Gallo
- Produced by: Jerry Bruckheimer; Will Smith; Chad Oman; Doug Belgrad
- Starring: Will Smith; Martin Lawrence; Vanessa Hudgens; Alexander Ludwig; Paola Núñez; Eric Dane; Ioan Gruffudd; Jacob Scipio; Melanie Liburd; Tasha Smith; Rhea Seehorn; Tiffany Haddish; Joe Pantoliano
- Cinematography: Robrecht Heyvaert
- Edited by: Asaf Eisenberg; Dan Lebental
- Music by: Lorne Balfe
- Production companies: Columbia Pictures; Don Simpson/Jerry Bruckheimer Films (Note: Jerry Bruckheimer Films used the Don Simpson/Jerry Bruckheimer Films logo in memory of Don Simpson, who co-produced the first film.); Westbrook Studios
- Distributed by: Sony Pictures Releasing
- Release dates: May 22, 2024 (Coca-Cola Arena); June 7, 2024 (United States)
- Running time: 113 minutes
- Country: United States
- Language: English
- Budget: $100 million
- Box office: $405 million

Bad Boys: Ride or Die is a 2024 American buddy cop action comedy film starring Will Smith and Martin Lawrence. The fourth installment of the Bad Boys film series, and the sequel to Bad Boys for Life (2020), it was directed by Adil El Arbi and Bilall Fallah, produced by Smith, Jerry Bruckheimer, Doug Belgrad and Chad Oman, and written by Chris Bremner and Will Beall. In addition to the duo, Joe Pantoliano, Vanessa Hudgens, Alexander Ludwig, Paola Núñez, and Jacob Scipio also reprise their roles from previous installments. Tasha Smith joins the cast as Theresa Burnett replacing Theresa Randle, who played the character in the first three films, along with new cast members that includes Eric Dane, Ioan Gruffudd, Melanie Liburd, and Rhea Seehorn. The story follows Miami detectives Mike Lowrey and Marcus Burnett, who are attempting to clear the name of their late Captain Conrad Howard after he is falsely accused of conspiracy.

Following the opening weekend box-office success of Bad Boys for Life, Sony announced plans for a fourth Bad Boys installment, with Bremner returning to write the script; however, in April 2022, production for the film was reportedly halted due to the incident with Smith slapping Chris Rock at the 2022 Academy Awards ceremony and the subsequent investigation. Eventually, it was announced that the film was in pre-production in February 2023, with principal photography beginning on April 3, 2023, in Atlanta, Georgia and ending on March 4, 2024.

The film premiered at Coca-Cola Arena in Dubai on May 22, 2024, and was released in the United States on June 7 by Sony Pictures Releasing. The film grossed $405 million worldwide against a production budget of $100 million and received mixed reviews from critics.

== Plot ==
Four years after the death of Isabel Aretas, (Note: As depicted in Bad Boys for Life (2020).) MPD Detective Mike Lowrey marries his physical therapist, Christine. During the reception, his partner, Detective Marcus Burnett, suffers a heart attack and goes into a coma, where he experiences a vision of the late Captain Conrad Howard telling him it is not his time. When Marcus wakes up, he believes that he cannot die.

Conspirators forced a Miami-based money launderer to transfer a large sum to Captain Howard's account and fabricate extensive transaction records before he was assassinated. News reports soon link Howard to a cartel. With his legacy being posthumously tarnished, Mike and Marcus, with the help of Captain Rita Secada and her boyfriend, mayoral candidate Adam Lockwood, aim to prove Howard's innocence. They visit Mike's son, Armando Aretas, who was imprisoned for Howard's death. Armando reveals that Howard wasn't corrupt but understood who was, and was killed to keep their secrets, and agrees to help identify the killer.

When the conspirators try to access Captain Howard's computer, a fail-safe, pre-recorded video is sent to Mike and Marcus, warning them of an extensive corruption scheme within law enforcement. Howard uses the phrase "Coke bottle" as a code phrase, and it is revealed that he gave information to their former hacker colleague Fletcher. They go to Fletcher's club to retrieve the "files", a QR code hidden in wall art that unlocks a second video from Captain Howard. However, assassins hired by the conspirators tail them to the club and kill Fletcher.

Meanwhile, Armando is attacked by several prisoners, paid to silence him, but he fends them off. Mike and Marcus arrange for Armando to be air-lifted to a more secure location in Miami. However, the conspirators sneak on board and kill the pilot and guards, causing the helicopter to crash. Mike, Marcus, and Armando survive but are branded as fugitives by the conspirators. When the conspirators put out a bounty, the trio are hunted by both law enforcement and opportunistic criminals. Conrad's daughter, U.S. Marshal Judy Howard, swears vengeance on Armando for killing her father.

With the assistance of AMMO (Advanced Miami Metro Operations) members Dorn and Kelly, Mike and Marcus uncover the video clues behind the murder and setup. Armando identifies the man who hired him to kill Captain Howard as James McGrath, a former Army Ranger assigned to Drug Enforcement Administration Intelligence in South America. While undercover, McGrath was captured by the cartel and brutally tortured until he gave up his associates and has been working with them ever since. McGrath orchestrates the abduction of Christine and Callie, Judy's daughter. He then sends his men to get Marcus's family, but Marcus's Marine son-in-law, Reggie, single-handedly kills all of them. Rita, Dorn, and Kelly apprehend Lockwood after learning McGrath works for him. By using Lockwood's voice in disguise to draw out McGrath by arranging for a transport plane out of Miami, the team engages in a fierce gun battle with McGrath's men at a former alligator-themed amusement park to rescue Christine and Callie. Later on, during the fight, Lockwood attempts to betray the team by wounding Dorn and Kelly before attempting to hijack the transport plane, but Rita shoots the plane down and stops him. Refusing to shoot him, she kicks him into the water, causing him to be devoured alive by an alligator. Mike confronts McGrath, who holds both Christine and Marcus hostage at gunpoint. McGrath then presents Mike with an impossible choice: pick Christine or Marcus to die. Mike, alluding to Marcus's newfound belief that he "cannot die", shoots Marcus in his bulletproof vest. The chaos allows Christine and Marcus to break free before Mike shoots McGrath dead. Amidst the chaos, Judy finds Armando and Callie. Judy prepares to kill Armando, but Callie tells her mother that he saved her life. Begrudgingly grateful for his heroic act, Judy shows mercy to Armando and allows him to escape.

Afterward, Mike, Marcus, and Howard are cleared of all charges, and the corruption is exposed. Mike and Marcus's families then celebrate by having a picnic in the park, with Mike and Marcus allowing Reggie to cook on a public grill due to him saving their family.

== Cast ==
- Will Smith as Det. Lt. Michael "Mike" Lowrey, Marcus's partner/best friend.
- Martin Lawrence as Det. Lt. Marcus Miles Burnett, Mike's partner/best friend.
- Vanessa Hudgens as Kelly, a weapons expert of AMMO.
- Alexander Ludwig as Dorn, a tech expert of AMMO.
- Paola Núñez as Rita Secada, new Miami PD captain and Mike's ex-girlfriend, now dating Adam Lockwood.
- Eric Dane as James McGrath, a former U.S. Army Ranger Staff Sergeant turned criminal after being captured and tortured by the Cartels
- Ioan Gruffudd as Adam Lockwood, a district attorney and Rita's romantic partner, seeking to become the next mayor of Miami
- Jacob Scipio as Armando Aretas, Mike's son and former Cartel assassin
- Melanie Liburd as Christine Lowrey, Mike's new wife
- Tasha Smith as Theresa Burnett, Marcus's wife; Smith replaces Theresa Randle, who portrayed the character in previous films
- Tiffany Haddish as Tabitha, a criminal acquaintance of Mike and Marcus.
- Joe Pantoliano as Captain Conrad Howard. The character was previously killed by Armando under McGrath's hiring, but appears both via video footage, and via a near-death ghostly vision had by Marcus and Mike.
- John Salley as Fletcher, a paroled hacker
- DJ Khaled as Manny the Butcher
- Rhea Seehorn as Judy Howard, a U.S. Marshal, Conrad Howard's daughter and Callie's mother, who is hunting down Mike and Marcus
- Dennis McDonald as Reggie Norman, Marcus' son-in-law and a U.S. Marine Master Sergeant, reprising his role from Bad Boys II and Bad Boys for Life
- Bianca Bethune as Megan Burnett, Marcus' daughter and Reggie's wife
- Quinn Hemphill as Callie Howard, Conrad Howard's granddaughter and Judy's daughter
- Jason Davis as Agent Grice, an FBI agent
- Derek Russo as Lintz, McGrath's second-in-command
- Joyner Lucas as a gang leader
- Jenna Kanell as Nicole, McGrath's hacker
- Khaby Lame as non-speaking cameo appearance

Michael Bay, who directed the first two installments, makes a cameo appearance as a Porsche driver, after previously cameoing in the second and third films.

== Production ==
=== Development ===
Following the opening weekend box-office success of Bad Boys for Life (2020), Sony announced plans for a fourth Bad Boys installment, with Chris Bremner returning to write the script.

In April 2022, it was reported that development for the fourth film was being put on hold in light of the incident with Will Smith slapping Chris Rock at the 2022 Academy Awards ceremony. However, the following month Sony head chairman Tom Rothman confirmed the fourth film was still in development, despite the previous report. In February 2023, Smith announced that he and Lawrence would reprise their roles for the film, which was in pre-production, with Adil & Bilall returning to direct. In March 2023, it was revealed that Vanessa Hudgens would reprise her role as Kelly from Bad Boys for Life. In April 2023, it was announced that Eric Dane had been cast, reportedly as the villain, and that Paola Núñez and Alexander Ludwig would also reprise their roles from Bad Boys for Life. The same month, Ioan Gruffudd joined the cast. In May 2023, it was announced that Rhea Seehorn had joined the cast. Bad Boys: Ride or Die was originally the working title by co-director Adil El Arbi, before it was confirmed in early 2024.

Despite his character's death early on in the previous film, Joe Pantoliano returned as Captain Conrad Howard thanks to Will Smith insisting on bringing him back.

=== Filming ===
Principal photography began on April 3, 2023, in Atlanta, Georgia and Miami, Florida. On May 22, 2023, TMZ released behind the scenes clips of Will Smith and Martin Lawrence filming scenes of the movie in Atlanta. Filming was suspended in July due to the 2023 SAG-AFTRA strike. In March 2024, it was revealed that Jacob Scipio would reprise his role as Armando Aretas from the previous film. Filming wrapped on March 4.

=== Post-production ===
Asaf Eisenberg and Dan Lebental served as editors on the film.

Lorne Balfe, who composed Bad Boys for Life, returned to compose the fourth film. Sony Classical released the soundtrack, coinciding with the film's release date.

=== Music ===
The soundtrack for the film was released by Epic Records on June 7, 2024, featuring its lead single, Black Eyed Peas and El Alfa’s "Tonight", featuring Becky G. Several artists were also featured on it, including Sean Paul, Flo Milli, Bia, Myke Towers, Shenseea, and JID, among others.

== Marketing ==
The first trailer of the film was released on March 26, 2024. The final trailer for the film was released on May 16. On May 28, Jimmy Butler of the Miami Heat and Lionel Messi of Inter Miami featured in another trailer.

== Release ==
=== Theatrical ===
The world premiere of Bad Boys: Ride or Die was held at Coca-Cola Arena in Dubai, United Arab Emirates, on May 22, 2024, and it was released in the United States on June 7, 2024. It was originally scheduled to be released on May 24, 2019, but it was moved up to July 3, 2019, before being pulled from the schedule. In July 2023, it was announced that the film would be released on June 14, 2024. In February 2024, the release date was moved up a week to June 7.

=== Home media ===
Sony Pictures Home Entertainment announced that Bad Boys: Ride or Die was released on Digital HD and platforms on July 23, 2024, and released on Ultra HD Blu-ray, Blu-ray, and DVD on September 24, 2024. It includes a blooper reel, deleted scenes, and a brand-new after credits scene.

== Reception ==
=== Box office ===
Bad Boys: Ride or Die grossed $193.6 million in the United States and Canada, and $210.6 million in other territories, for a worldwide total of $405 million.

In the United States and Canada, Ride or Die was released alongside The Watchers, and was initially projected to gross around $40 million from 3,850 theaters in its opening weekend. After making $21 million on its first day, including $5.88 million from Thursday night previews, weekend estimates were raised to $52 million. It went on to debut to $56.5 million, topping the box office. 72% of opening weekend tickets were sold day-of, while 50% of the audience was under 35, with 44% being Black, 26% Hispanic and Latino, 18% Caucasian, and 12% Asian American/other. In its sophomore weekend the film made $33.7 million (an "amazing" drop of just 40%, the best of the series), finishing in second behind newcomer Inside Out 2.

=== Critical response ===
On the review aggregator website Rotten Tomatoes, 65% of 254 critics' reviews are positive, with an average rating of 6.0/10. The website's consensus reads: "Will Smith and Martin Lawrence remain good company even when Bad Boys strains to up the ante, proving there's still life left in this high-octane franchise." Metacritic, which uses a weighted average, assigned the film a score of 54 out of 100, based on 50 critics, indicating "mixed or average" reviews. Audiences polled by CinemaScore gave the film an average grade of "A–" on an A+ to F scale, making the film the first installment in the series not to earn an A. PostTrak reported a 90% overall positive score, with 84% saying they would definitely recommend it.

The BBC was more mixed, stating, "Critics are sometimes told that we shouldn't analyse Hollywood blockbusters, we should just switch off our brains and enjoy them. Well, not many films are as dependent on our brains being on standby as Bad Boys: Ride or Die. The plot is nonsensical, the grenade-dodging stunts are even more nonsensical, and the internal logic is non-existent: the assertion that Marcus has to avoid stressful situations after his heart attack is forgotten within 30 seconds. But the film is fun enough in its chaotic, grungy, rough and ready way."

=== Accolades ===
Award	Date of ceremony	Category	Recipient(s)	Result	Ref.
NAACP Image Awards	February 22, 2025	Outstanding Motion Picture	Bad Boys: Ride or Die	Nominated	
NAACP Image Awards	February 22, 2025	Outstanding Actor in a Motion Picture	Martin Lawrence	Won	

== Future ==
On June 7, 2024, Smith and Lawrence told Entertainment Weekly that they would be open to return for a fifth film in the franchise, as long as the younger cast members do more stunts and there is a story involving their characters worth being told, with Lawrence also noting it would depend on whether the fans demanded more films. On June 11, 2024, producer Jerry Bruckheimer noted that there had been discussions for a fifth Bad Boys film, but they are primarily waiting to see how Bad Boys: Ride or Die performs at the box office.
