= Black (2015 Belgian film) =

2015 film

- Film poster
- Directed by: Adil El Arbi; Bilall Fallah
- Written by: Adil El Arbi; Bilall Fallah
- Based on: Black by Dirk Bracke; Back by Dirk Bracke
- Starring: Martha Canga Antonio; Aboubakr Bensaihi
- Cinematography: Robrecht Heyvaert
- Music by: Hannes De Maeyer
- Release dates: 11 September 2015 (TIFF); 11 November 2015 (Belgium)
- Running time: 95 minutes
- Country: Belgium
- Languages: French; Dutch; Arabic

Black is a 2015 Belgian crime film written and directed by Adil El Arbi and Bilall Fallah, based on the books Black and Back by Dirk Bracke. The film is centered around two young gangsters who seek love, but are impeded by the rivalry between their gang allegiances.

The plot line is influenced by William Shakespeare's Romeo and Juliet and Arthur Laurent's West Side Story but relocates the story to street gangs in modern-day Brussels, Belgium. It premiered at the 2015 Toronto International Film Festival, where it was screened in the Discovery section.

== Plot ==
The film follows the story of Mavela, a young woman caught between loyalty and love amid Brussels' gang conflicts. She falls in love with Marwan, a member of a rival gang, leading to a dangerous and intense romance. As their relationship unfolds, they must navigate the challenges of their respective allegiances while trying to break free from the cycle of violence and crime that surrounds them. The movie portrays the gritty urban landscape, the struggles of youth in marginalized communities, and the power of human connection amidst adversity.

== Cast ==
- Martha Canga Antonio as Mavela/Marie-Evelyne
- Aboubakr Bensaihi as Marwan
- Soufiane Chilah as Nassim
- Marine Scandiuzzi as Sindi
- Simon Frey as Jonathan
- Sanaa Bourrasse as Loubna
- Emmanuel Tahon as X
- Théo Kabeya as Notorious
- Natascha Boyamba as Justelle
- Glodie Lombi as Angela
- Jérémie Zagba as Don
- Axel Masudi as CMM
- Brandon Masudi as Alonzo
- Ashley Ntangu as Doris
- Eric Kabongo as Krazy-E

== Accolades ==
Award / Film Festival	Category	Recipients and nominees	Result
Magritte Awards	Best Actor	Aboubakr Bensaihi	Nominated
Magritte Awards	Most Promising Actress	Martha Canga Antonio	Nominated
Magritte Awards	Best Flemish Film		Nominated
Magritte Awards	Best Costume Design	Nina Caspari	Nominated
Magritte Awards	Best Original Score	Hannes De Maeyer	Nominated

== Streetcasting ==
To amplify the harshness and roughness, they chose to work with unknown actors and actresses. Most of the cast were picked right off the streets, hence the term "streetcasting". In cooperation with the casting agency Hakuna Casting, Nabil Mallat and Chafic Amraoui visited Brussels' migrant neighborhoods looking for new talent. Caroline Bastin coached the newfound actors during the auditions. Because of the unique background of the cast, these talents were able to give the film's narrative a special touch.
