= Tim Mielants =

Belgian film and television director

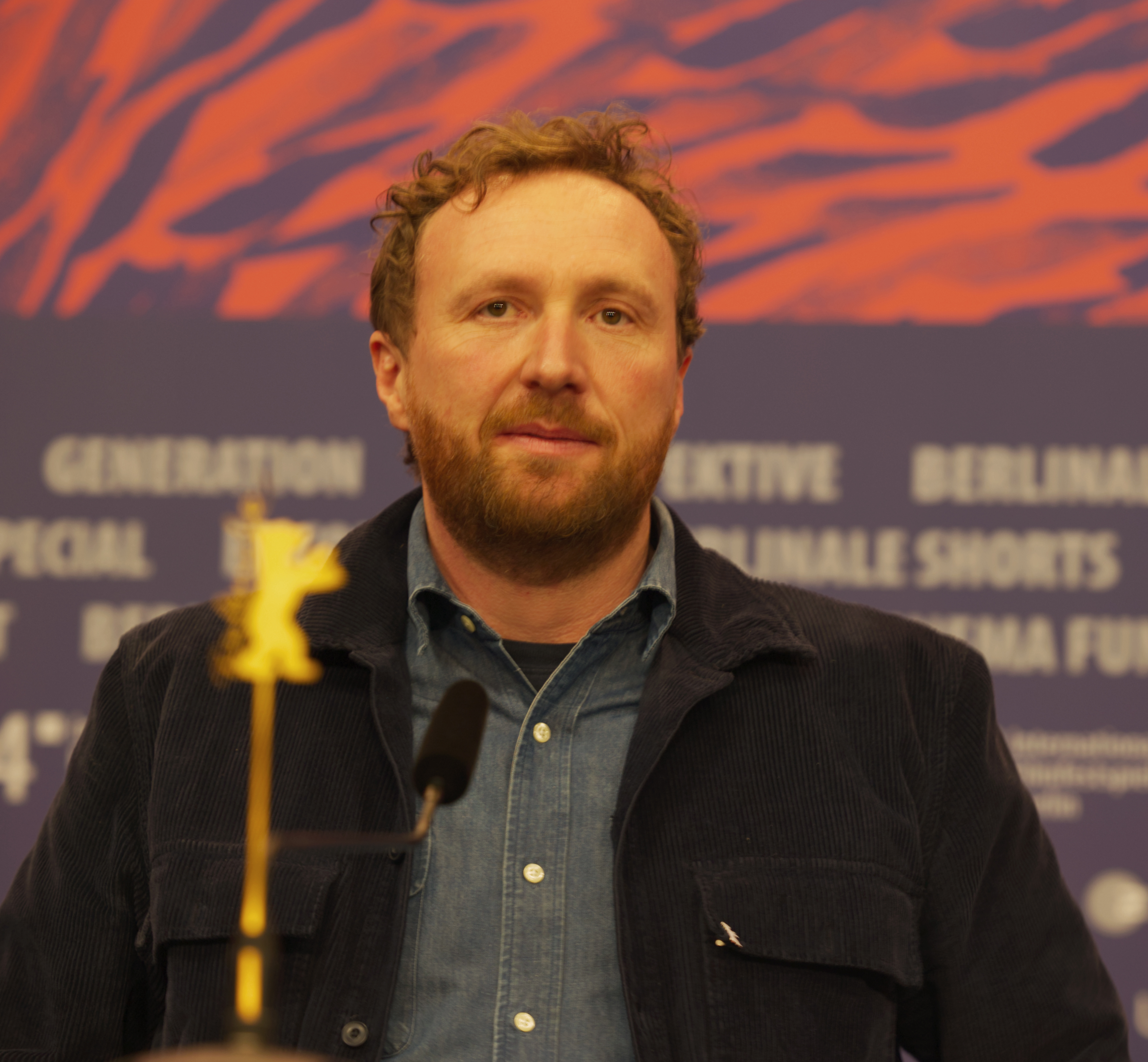
Melants in 2024

Tim Mielants is a Belgian director of film and television. He is known for his collaborations with actor Cillian Murphy, having directed the third series of BBC's Peaky Blinders, as well as the films Small Things Like These (2024) and Steve (2025). He has also directed episodes of the TV series The Tunnel, Legion and The Terror.

== Select filmography as director ==
- Patrick (2019)
- Wil (2023)
- Small Things like These (2024)
- Steve (2025)
