= Frédéric Thoraval =

French-American film editor

- Born: February 18, 1973 (age 52)
- Occupation: Film editor

Frédéric Thoraval (born February 18, 1973) is a French-American film editor. He was nominated for an Academy Award in the category Best Film Editing for the film Promising Young Woman.

== Selected filmography ==
- Peppermint (2018)
- Promising Young Woman (2020)
- The Black Phone (2021)
- Rebel (2022)
- The Gorge (2025)
