= H4Z4RD =

- Film poster
- Directed by: Jonas Govaerts
- Written by: Trent Haaga
- Produced by: Dimitri 'Vegas' Thivaios; Peter De Maegd; Tom Hameeuw; Lize Lefaible
- Starring: Dimitri Vegas; Jennifer Heylen; Jeroen Perceval; Frank Lammers
- Cinematography: Dries Delputte
- Edited by: Maarten Janssens
- Music by: Adam Wiltzie
- Production companies: Dream Big Productions; Potemkino
- Release date: 20 July 2022
- Running time: 88 minutes
- Country: Belgium
- Language: Dutch

H4Z4RD is a 2022 Dutch-language action comedy film, written by Trent Haaga and directed by Jonas Govaerts. It stars Dimitri Vegas, Jennifer Heylen, and Jeroen Perceval, with guest star Frank Lammers.

The film follows Noah Hazard and his brother Carlos, who take a job for money, only to find themselves in deeper trouble than they were expecting.

Throughout the film, except in the last minutes, the camera stays in or near the car.

H4Z4RD was released on July 20 in Belgium and received limited screenings in the United States throughout the year. It received mostly positive reviews from critics.

== Plot ==
The film follows Noah Hazard, who takes a job with his brother that leads to an adventure that endangers his family and his prized car.

== Release ==
The film was released on July 20 in Belgium. In the United States, the film premiered at the Fantastic Fest film festival. In Canada, the film was shown on October 19 at Toronto After Dark.

== Reception ==
The film received overall positive reviews from critics.

Bloody Disgusting praised the film, calling it, "darkly funny, violent, and full of unexpected detours". /Film also praised the film, giving it 7.5/10 stars and calling it, "a full-throttle midnighter that barely runs out of gas".
