= Oum (singer) =

Moroccan singer-songwriter (born 1978)

Oum أم الغيث بن الصحراوي
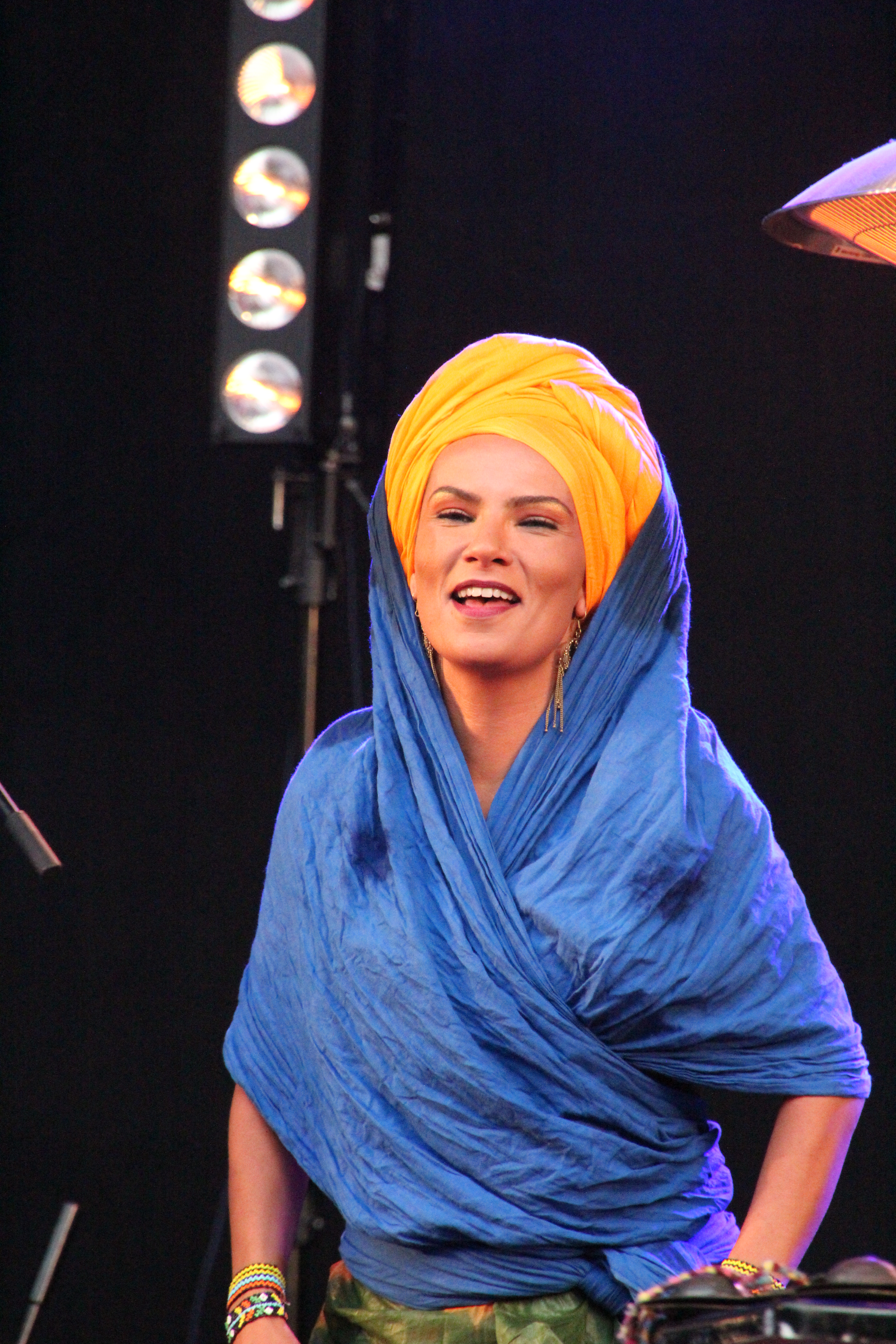
- Oum in 2016

Background information
- Born: 18 April 1978 (age 48); Casablanca, Morocco
- Occupation: Singer-songwriter

Oum El Ghaït Benessahraoui (Arabic: أم الغيث بن الصحراوي, born 18 April 1978), better known mononymously as Oum (Arabic: أوم), is a Moroccan singer-songwriter. Performing and recording both in North Africa and in Europe, she mixes hassani, jazz, gospel, soul, afrobeat and Sufi musical influences in her songs.

== Early life and education ==
Oum, born in Casablanca and raised in Marrakesh, is a singer-songwriter inspired by Moroccan popular music, Hassani poetry (Moroccan desert culture) and African rhythms. She interprets her lyrics in Moroccan Arabic (Darija), Amazigh, French, English and Spanish.

At the young age of fourteen, Oum joined a gospel choir in her native Casablanca, where she impressed listeners with her voice and interpretation. At seventeen, her first song, "This is your heart" that she wrote to support the charity "Les malades du cœur", helped to successfully secure her first appearance on television. In 1996, she entered the National School of Architecture in Rabat and pursued her studies there until graduation in 2002.

== Musical career ==
At the same time, she began to perform in public. With a powerful and expressive voice, she interpreted songs by singers such as Aretha Franklin, Ella Fitzgerald or Whitney Houston. In 1998, Oum had her first experience with hip-hop and RnB, working with Djo Catangana, a producer and creator of the French hip hop collective Mafia Trece.

In 2002, she was noticed by Philippe Delmas, who invited her to Paris. For two years, she alternated recording sessions and concerts in Casablanca with the Brotherhood band. In 2004, she ended her Parisian period.

Back in Morocco, she entered new musical universes: the Gnaoui and the Hassani traditions. Oum's decision to introduce such local rhythms not only influenced her songs' tunes, but also her lyrics. She performed with Barry, a musician known for his fusion of musical styles and repertoires, on the stages of the Gnaoua World Music Festival in Essaouira, the Tanjazz in Tangier, and the Barcelona Acció Musical in Barcelona.

Her first album Lik 'Oum was published in Casablanca in May 2009. The first single from her second album Sweerty (Luck), Whowa means "Him" in Moroccan Darija. It was released with a video clip in January 2010. In July 2012, she released Harguin, a collaboration with Blitz the Ambassador on the theme of illegal immigration from sub-Saharan Africa.

Oum was invited to the UNESCO headquarters in Paris on the occasion of International Women's Day to give a concert on 7 March 2012. In June 2013 she was invited to take part in the Gnaoua World Music Festival in Essaouira (Morocco).

Her song Taragalte, from the 2013 album Soul of Morocco, was used in the 2018 movie Beirut. In September 2015, she released her fourth album: Zarabi, which means "Carpets" in Moroccan Darija and is a tribute to the carpet weavers of the village of M'Hamid El Ghizlane in the Sahara region of the Moroccan South. She wrote and co-directed the album with Mathis Haug. Yacir Rami accompanied her on the oud, Cuban musicians Damian Nueva on double bass and Yelfris Valdés on trumpet, as well as Moroccan percussionist Rhani Krija, who has played with Sting, Peter Gabriel and others, joined her band for this album.

== Discography ==
=== Albums ===
Lik'Oum (2009)

click [show] to see the tracks

| No. | Title | Length |
|---|---|---|
| 1. | "Intro" | 1:16 |
| 2. | "Salam" | 2:45 |
| 3. | "Marrakech" | 1:25 |
| 4. | "Lik" | 3:51 |
| 5. | "Shine" | 4:00 |
| 6. | "Aji" | 3:59 |
| 7. | "Bahja" | 10:46 |
| 8. | "Menni Lik" | 7:38 |
| Total length: | | 35:00 |

Sweerty (2012)

click [show] to see the tracks

| No. | Title | Length |
|---|---|---|
| 1. | "Bird in Cage" | 5:57 |
| 2. | "On the Wall" | 5:36 |
| 3. | "Little Girl" | 4:03 |
| 4. | "Neddik" | 6:20 |
| 5. | "Heaven Blue" | 4:56 |
| 6. | "On the Moon" | 4:06 |
| 7. | "Whowa" | 4:15 |
| 8. | "Oum Maysan" | 5:08 |
| 9. | "Aoulama" | 4:20 |
| 10. | "Harguin (feat. Blitz The Ambassador)" | 4:28 |
| 11. | "Love Is Alive" | 5:09 |
| 12. | "Raver" | 5:02 |
| 13. | "Soul Trap" | 6:19 |
| 14. | "Mnama" | 3:46 |
| 15. | "Oum Song (bonus track, feat. Manu Dibango)" | 3:38 |
| Total length: | | 72:55 |

Soul of Morocco(2013)

click [show] to see the tracks

| No. | Title | Length |
|---|---|---|
| 1. | "Whowa" | 4:33 |
| 2. | "Shine" | 4:55 |
| 3. | "Salam" | 5:21 |
| 4. | "Lik" | 4:11 |
| 5. | "Haylala" | 6:43 |
| 6. | "Mnama" | 5:15 |
| 7. | "Taragalte" | 7:12 |
| 8. | "Menni Lik" | 11:18 |
| 9. | "Aji" | 7:47 |
| Total length: | | = 57:00 |

Zarabi (2015)

click [show] to see the tracks

| No. | Title | Length |
|---|---|---|
| 1. | "Nia" | 4:33 |
| 2. | "Lia" | 5:43 |
| 3. | "Hna" | 4:17 |
| 4. | "Jini" | 4:15 |
| 5. | "Ah Wah" | 4:55 |
| 6. | "Wali" | 4:32 |
| 7. | "Mansit" | 4:13 |
| 8. | "N'nay" | 3:56 |
| 9. | "Saadi" | 4:14 |
| 10. | "Veinte Años" | 5:10 |
| Total length: | | 45:00 |

Daba (2020)

click [show] to see the tracks

| No. | Title | Length |
|---|---|---|
| 1. | "Fasl / Season / فصل" | 4:32 |
| 2. | "Chajra / Chakra / شقرا" | 3:31 |
| 3. | "Temma / تيما" | 4:11 |
| 4. | "Daba / Now / دبا" | 3:46 |
| 5. | "Rhyam / Cloud / غيم" | 5:34 |
| 6. | "Jnan / جنان (interlude)" | 0:46 |
| 7. | "Kemmy / You / كمين" | 3:20 |
| 8. | "Mezzinellil / ميزانيلليل" | 4:20 |
| 9. | "Ha / Here / ها" | 3:21 |
| 10. | "Yabhar / sail /يبحر" | 5:05 |
| 11. | "Laji / لاجى" | 4:42 |
| 12. | "Sadak / صادق" | 6:33 |

=== Singles ===
1. Oum featuring Barry : Dear Mamma (2003)
2. Hamdoullah (2004)
3. Daym Allah (2004)
4. Africa (2004})
5. Humilité (2005)
6. La Ti'ass feat. H. Kayne (2008)
7. Hip Hop Exchange Featuring H-Kayne & Tote King (2009)
8. Lik (2009)
9. Oum featuring Don Bigg : Lik (2010)
10. Taragalte (Soul of Morocco) (2013)
