= Racer and the Jailbird =

2017 film by Michaël R. Roskam

- Theatrical release poster
- French: Le Fidèle
- Literally: The Faithful
- Directed by: Michaël R. Roskam
- Written by: Thomas Bidegain; Noé Debré; Michaël R. Roskam
- Produced by: Bart Van Langendonck; Pierre-Ange Le Pogam
- Starring: Matthias Schoenaerts; Adèle Exarchopoulos
- Cinematography: Nicolas Karakatsanis
- Edited by: Alain Dessauvage
- Music by: Raf Keunen
- Production companies: Stone Angels; Savage Film; Wallimage; Pathé; Wild Bunch; Eyeworks Film & TV Drama; Frakas Productions; Kaap Holland Film
- Distributed by: Pathé
- Release dates: 7 September 2017 (TIFF); 4 October 2017 (Belgium); 1 November 2017 (France)
- Running time: 130 minutes
- Countries: Belgium; France; Netherlands
- Languages: French; Flemish
- Budget: €8 million ($9.6 million)
- Box office: $401,429

Racer and the Jailbird (French: Le Fidèle) is a 2017 romantic crime drama film co-written and directed by Michaël R. Roskam. It stars Matthias Schoenaerts and Adèle Exarchopoulos as a gangster and a race car driver who fall in love, but come into conflict with a brutal crime gang in Brussels. It was selected to be screened out of competition at the 74th Venice International Film Festival in 2017.

It was selected as the Belgian entry for the Best Foreign Language Film at the 90th Academy Awards, but it was not nominated as a finalist. It received five nominations at the 8th Magritte Awards, including Best Flemish Film.

== Plot ==
In flashback Gigi as a boy is running from the police and his own father threatens to release attack dogs on him.

Introduced to Bibi after a motor racing event, Gigi pretends he works importing and exporting cars, and asks her out on a date. As their relationship continues, comments from his friends about their wild youth and his time in juvenile detention raise her suspicions. In a private moment Bibi asks him to reveal his greatest secret, and Gigi jokingly admits he robs banks. They daydream about travel and, when asked if she could go anywhere, Bibi suggests they should go to Buenos Aires. Gigi and his friends successfully rob a banker they met at party held by Bibi's racing group. Gigi is falling in love with Bibi and is reluctant to do any further jobs. Bibi's father has suspicions and confronts Gigi, urging him to be honest with Bibi like a real man should be. Gigi says that he wants to marry Bibi. Bibi has a growing realisation that Gigi isn't telling her the whole truth about his life, but they confess their love for each other.

The gang plan another more elaborate heist; they choose Gigi as their getaway driver. The gang drop a shipping container off a road bridge, to trap a money transport van and police escort. They get away with the money but Gigi is sick with nerves. The money is booby trapped with explosives, and one of the gang is badly injured.

Gigi leaves the hideout to call a doctor from a nearby payphone. He also calls Bibi and she warns him that a police officer was killed in the robbery and that a major manhunt was underway. She pleads with him not to resist, for her sake. The gang is caught and all are tried, convicted, and sent to prison. Bibi is sure of her love and wants to stay with Gigi. During her brief prison visits, they make love in the hope of her getting pregnant. They turn to fertility treatment to try to conceive.

One day on temporary leave from prison, Gigi is bitten on the leg by a small dog. After he kicks the dog in retaliation, the police get involved and Gigi runs in panic. Bibi hides him temporarily but when a police manhunt begins, she convinces him to give himself up and return to prison.

Medical tests reveal that Bibi has cancer growing in her ovaries. Desperate, she turns to gangsters to help her break Gigi out of prison. The gangsters think she is suffering from morning sickness and decline to help her. When their boss goes to meet her, he realizes that she has been ravaged by chemotherapy, and she admits she has an aggressive cancer. She wants Gigi broken out of prison only if she dies, and the boss agrees, taking her Porsche as collateral. As he leaves, Bibi collapses and is taken to hospital. Gigi has been told nothing about her plans to break him out and has been trying to break out himself. Gigi is allowed to leave prison under heavy guard and visit Bibi in hospital. She has already fallen into a coma, and dies.

Prisoners explain to Gigi that a breakout has been arranged, and there is a plan to smuggle him to Buenos Aires. To confirm it is real, they say the words "No flowers", repeating the request Bibi made of him on their first date. They savagely beat him, forcing the prison warden to transfer him to another prison for his protection. During the transport, they break him out.

Gigi does not want to go to Buenos Aires, he only wants to be with Bibi. The gangsters don't tolerate this since their payout is tied to Gigi's arrival in Buenos Aires. As punishment, they lock him in a cage in a warehouse full of dogs. When they come back to retrieve him, he attacks with a chain and kills his kidnappers.

He finds Bibi's Porsche and drives along a route she had driven before. In voiceover, we hear the scene from earlier in the film where Bibi and Gigi discuss their biggest secrets, Bibi's reveals her secret: she is immortal. Gigi drives to a cemetery and leaves the car running as he runs in to meet her.

== Cast ==
- Matthias Schoenaerts as Gino "Gigi" Vanoirbeek
- Adèle Exarchopoulos as Bénédicte "Bibi" Delhany
- Dimitry Loubry as Maton
- Charley Pasteleurs as Commissaire de Cours
- Sam Louwyck
- Stefaan Degand
- Guray Nalbant
- Igor van Dessel
- Nathalie Van Tongelen as Sandra

== Production ==
On 16 May 2012, Screen Daily reported that Savage Film would produce director's Michael R. Roskam's new film, then titled Faithful, described as a film noir set against the background of the brutal crime gangs in Brussels in the late 1980s.

On 18 December 2012, Variety reported that Matthias Schoenaerts would reteam with Bullhead director Michael R. Roskam in the film, and it would be produced by Bart Van Langendonck at Brussels-based Savage Film and was set to start shooting in 2014. On 21 December 2013, Variety announced that Thomas Bidegain would write the screenplay alongside Michael R. Roskam. On 12 September 2015, Adèle Exarchopoulos joined the cast, and the film was described as a "noirish romance thriller set against the backdrop of crime gangs in Brussels", and shooting was scheduled to start in 2016.

Principal photography began in Brussels in 25 April 2016 and was completed on 15 July 2016. The English title was changed from "The Faithful" to "The Racer and the Jailbird" in May 2016.

== Release ==
The film was released in Belgium on 4 October 2017. Wild Bunch handled international sales, while Pathé will distributed the film in France on 1 November 2017. Neon pre-bought the North American rights to the film at the Berlin Film Festival in February 2017, and theatrically released the film on 4 May 2018.

=== Critical response ===
On Rotten Tomatoes, the film has an approval rating of 36% based on 53 reviews, and an average rating of 5.22/10. On Metacritic, the film has a weighted average score of 50 out of 100, based on reviews from 17 critics, indicating "mixed or average reviews".

Owen Gleiberman of Variety writes that the success of a dramatic love story hinges on there being interesting obstacles to overcome. Gleiberman says that Gigi's lack of honesty and vulnerability threatening their relationship is a good obstacle but that the obstacle of Gigi's inevitable incarceration "seems to choke off the film's dramatic possibilities" and "the whole thing becomes drenched in a kind of downbeat sentimental martyrdom that feels oppressively old-fashioned and moribund."

== See also ==
- List of submissions to the 90th Academy Awards for Best Foreign Language Film
- List of Belgian submissions for the Academy Award for Best Foreign Language Film
