= Ensor Award =

Flemish film award

- Awarded for: Excellence in cinematic achievements
- Country: Belgium
- Presented by: Ensor Academie
- First award: 2010
- Website: ensors.be

The Ensor Award (for the first two years Vlaamse Filmprijzen) is an accolade presented by the Ensor Academy of Belgium to recognize cinematic achievement in the film industry and is the highest film honour in the Flemish speaking part of the country. The awards are given out annually at the Ostend Film Festival.

The trophy was created by Ostend artist Yves Velter from Ostend and named after James Ensor, it is the successor of the Joseph Plateau Award that honored films from the entire country. Since its discontinuation, the Magritte Awards are given to French speaking movies, while the Ensors honor Flemish productions.

The nominees are decided by a jury panel. While the winners are voted by the entire board of Ensor Academy, which consists of members from the film industry. In 2018 categories for achievement in television were introduced.

Since 2022, the Ensors, have been gender neutral, meaning the awards do not separate male and female performances in acting categories. This has led to some years where men are the only winners in acting categories.

== Noteworthy Winners ==
At the ninth edition, two films tied for the top prize as best film. The tenth Ensor Awards ceremony was held on September 14, 2019 and saw the film Girl dominating by winning eight trophies including best film.

== Awards ceremonies ==
The following is a listing of all Ensor Awards ceremonies and Best picture winners.

| Ceremony | Date | Best Film winner |
|---|---|---|
| 1st Ensor Awards | 10 September 2010 | The Misfortunates |
| 2nd Ensor Awards | 10 September 2011 | Bullhead |
| 3rd Ensor Awards | 14 and 15 September 2012 | Time of My Life |
| 4th Ensor Awards | 13 and 14 September 2013 | The Broken Circle Breakdown |
| 5th Ensor Awards | 20 September 2014 | Marina |
| 6th Ensor Awards | 19 September 2015 | N – The Madness of Reason |
| 7th Ensor Awards | 16 September 2016 | The Ardennes |
| 8th Ensor Awards | 15 and 16 September 2017 | Home |
| 9th Ensor Awards | 15 September 2018 | Racer and the Jailbird and Zagros |
| 10th Ensor Awards | 14 September 2019 | Girl |
| 11th Ensor Awards | 23 January 2021 | Patrick |
| 12th Ensor Awards | 12 March 2022 | Dealer |
| 13th Ensor Awards | 4 February 2023 | Close |
| 14th Ensor Awards | 3 February 2024 | Wil |
| 15th Ensor Awards | 8 February 2025 | Skunk |
| 16th Ensor Awards | 7 February 2026 | Julian |

== Nominations and Voting ==
=== Voters ===
Every active member of the Flemish audiovisual industry can the Academy, including employees in 'non-artistic' jobs in Flemish production companies. Staff members of film festivals subsidized by the Flemish Audiovisual Fund (VAF) can also join.

=== Rules ===
Only Flemish films and television are considered. To be a 'majority Flemish' film or television series two of three categories must be met. One, the core of the artistic team (like the director, actor(s), or screenwriter) must be Flemish. Two, the content is Flemish, or three, its a Flemish production either through money or producers.

=== Voting Process ===
A list eligible of film and tv candidates if complied. Then Every Academy member is given three votes for each category. The three titles that received the most votes in each category are nominated, and after considering individual professional categories, the Academy votes to add two more titles to each category.

After this first nomination round, the nominees are released to the public. The Academy members then vote again, but are only are allowed one vote per category. The titles with the most vote in their category win.

== Categories ==
=== Current Categories ===
The Ensors award both film and television.

=== Film Awards ===
| Since | Film Awards |
|---|---|
| 2010 | Best Film |
| 2010 | Best Director |
| 2022 | Best Performance in a Lead Role |
| 2022 | Best Performance in a Supporting Role |
| 2010 | Best Screenplay |
| 2011 | Best Cinematography |
| 2011 | Best Production Design |
| 2011 | Best Editing |
| 2011 | Best Music |
| | Best Sound |
| | Best Makeup |
| | Best Costume Design |
| 2012 | Best Documentary |
| 2011 | Best Co-Production |
| 2012 | Best Short Film |
| 2012 | Best Animated Short |
| 2016 | Best Youth Film |

=== TV Awards ===
| Since | TV Awards |
|---|---|
| 2017 | Best TV-Series |
| 2017 | Best Direction - TV Series |
| 2022 | Best Performance in a Lead Role - TV Series |
| 2022 | Best Performance in a Supporting Role - TV Series |
| 2017 | Best Screenplay - TV Series |
| | Best DoP (Director of Photography) - TV Series |
| | Best Art Direction - TV Series |
| | Best Editing - TV Series |
| | Best Music - TV Series |
| | Best Sound - TV Series |
| | Best Makeup - TV Series |
| | Best Costume Design - TV Series |
| 2017 | Best TV Documentary |

Ensor Awards Chosen By Other Bodies
| Award | Chosen By |
|---|---|
| The Box Office Prize | Box office numbers |
| Telenet Audience Award | Audience vote |
| International Breakthrough of the Year (Albert Bert Prijs) | BOD of The Ensors |
| Promise of the Year with the support of BNP Paribas Fortis | BOD of The Ensors |
| Best French-speaking Belgian Film | BOD of The Ensors |
| Best Co-Production | BOD of The Ensors |
| Lifetime Achievement Award | FFO |

==== Retired Award Categories ====
| Years active | Retired Award |
|---|---|
| 2010–2018 | Best Debut |
| 2010–2017 | Best Actor in a Supporting Role |
| 2010–2017 | Best Actress in a Supporting Role |
| 2011–2017 | Best Costume Design |
| 2010-2022 | Best Actor in a Leading Role |
| 2010-2022 | Best Actress in a Leading Role |
| 2017 | Best Actress - TV Series |

== See also ==
- Magritte Award (Waloon equivalent)
- Joseph Plateau Award
