= Adil El Arbi and Bilall Fallah =

Moroccan-Belgian film and television directors

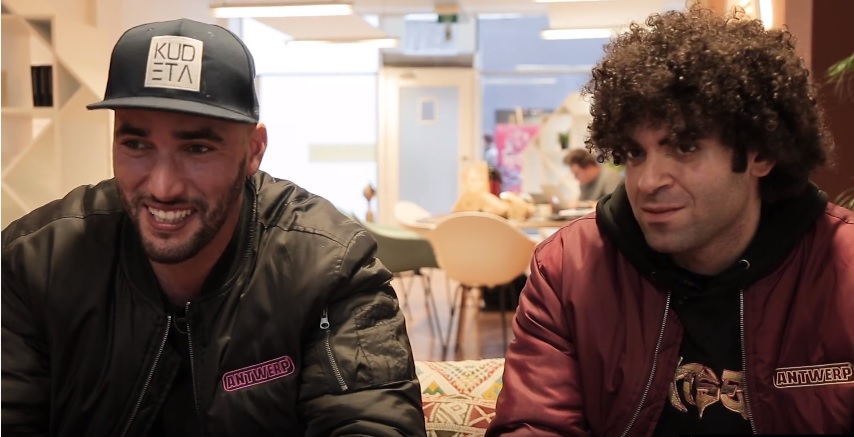
- Fallah (left) and El Arbi (right), 2018
- Born: Adil El Arbi; June 30, 1988 (age 38); Edegem, Belgium Bilall Fallah; January 4, 1986 (age 40); Vilvoorde, Belgium
- Education: LUCA School of Arts, Brussels
- Occupations: Film directors; screenwriters; film editors
- Years active: 2010–present

Adil El Arbi (born June 30, 1988) and Bilall Fallah (born January 4, 1986) are Moroccan-Belgian filmmakers. The duo, collectively billed as Adil & Bilall, are known for writing and directing the feature films Image (2014), Black (2015), and Gangsta (2018), as well as directing both Bad Boys for Life (2020) and Bad Boys: Ride or Die (2024), the third and fourth installments of the Bad Boys franchise starring Will Smith and Martin Lawrence.

== Career ==
Of Moroccan descent, Adil El Arbi and Bilall Fallah met during their film studies at the Hogeschool voor Wetenschap en Kunsten in Schaerbeek, Brussels, Belgium. During their studies, the first project that they directed was a short film named Broeders (2011), which was appreciated by critics; their later films, Black (2015) and Patser (2018), also received positive reception.

They directed the first two episodes in the TV series Snowfall, which aired on July 5 and 12 in 2017, as well as fellow Belgians and friends Dimitri Vegas & Like Mike's music videos, such as "When I Grow Up", which features American rapper Wiz Khalifa, and ''Melody'', which features Steve Aoki and Ummet Ozcan.

The duo were attached to direct the fourth installment of the Beverly Hills Cop film series, in which Eddie Murphy was to reprise his role. Later, in April 2022, it was announced that the duo would no longer direct the fourth Beverly Hills Cop film as previously intended.

In 2022, the duo directed and executive produced episodes of the Marvel Cinematic Universe series Ms. Marvel for Disney+.

=== Bad Boys franchise ===
The duo are perhaps best known internationally for directing both Bad Boys for Life (2020) and Bad Boys: Ride or Die (2024), the third and fourth installments of the Bad Boys franchise starring Will Smith and Martin Lawrence.

Bad Boys for Life was theatrically released in the United States on January 17, 2020, by Sony Pictures Releasing. It became a worldwide box office hit, grossing $424.6 million internationally. It became both the highest-grossing film in the Bad Boys franchise and the highest-grossing film released in January.

Bad Boys: Ride or Die premiered at Coca-Cola Arena in Dubai on May 22, 2024, and went on to become a box office success worldwide as well, grossing more than $200 million as of June 2024, becoming the tenth-highest-grossing film of 2024.

=== Unreleased projects ===
In February 2017, Bilall Fallah and Adil El Arbi were attached to direct the pilot episode of the WGN America series Scalped, which filmed in New Mexico in early April, but in November, after WGN screened it, they decided to pass on the series, and it has never been released.

In May 2021, it was announced that the duo would direct a film featuring Batgirl for HBO Max. In August 2022, Warner Bros. Discovery made the decision to write the completed Batgirl film off for tax purposes, leaving it unreleased. With a reported $90 million budget, Batgirl is one of the highest budget movies in history to be produced but not released.

== Filmography ==
Feature film

Year	Title	Directors	Writers	Editors	Notes	Ref.
2014	Image	Yes	Yes	Yes		
2015	Black	Yes	Yes	Yes		
2018	Gangsta	Yes	Yes	Yes		
2020	Bad Boys for Life	Yes	No	No		
2022	Rebel	Yes	Yes	No		
2024	Bad Boys: Ride or Die	Yes	No	No		
2025	Gangstas	Yes	Yes	Yes		
2026	7 Dogs	Yes	No	No	Saudi Arabian film	

Short film

Year	Title	Directors	Writers	Editors
2011	Broeders	Yes	Adil El Arbi	No
2016	Patient Zero	No	No	Bilall Fallah
2017	Hashtag	Yes	Yes	Yes

=== Television ===
Year	Title	Directors	Writers	Executive producers	Notes
2012	Bergica	Yes	Yes	No	
2017	Scalped	Yes	No	No	Unaired pilot
2017	Snowfall	Yes	No	No	2 episodes
2021	Soil	Yes	No	No	2 episodes
2022	Ms. Marvel	Yes	No	Yes	2 episodes

=== Music videos ===
Year	Title	Artist
2016	Melody	Dimitri Vegas & Like Mike, Steve Aoki & Ummet Ozcan
2018	When I Grow Up	Dimitri Vegas & Like Mike feat. Wiz Khalifa
