= Ostend Film Festival =

Annual film festival held in Ostend, Belgium

Coordinates: 50°50′N 4°00′E

- Location: Ostend, Belgium
- Founded: 2007; 18 years ago
- Awards: Ensor Awards; Jamies Video Creator Awards

The Ostend Film Festival (Dutch: 'Filmfestival Oostende') is an annual film festival held in Ostend, Belgium. The film voted by a jury as the best in the competition section receives the Best Film Award. It was launched in 2007 and has been held every year in September. In 2022 the 14th instance of the festival was held in March.

In 2010, the Festival transformed its structure to create the Flemish film awards, which in 2012 was named the Ensor Awards. The Ensor Awards take place at the end of each festival to honor the cinematic achievements in the Flemish film and television industry. The Jamies for the best Flemish online video maker are also awarded there each year.

== Awards ==
=== The Ensor Awards ===
The festival was founded in 2007 and in 2010 organized the first Flemish Film Awards. In 2012, the awards were renamed the Ensor Awards. These awards were given out by an annually changing jury at the festival up until 2017. In 2018, the Ostend Film Festival spun off the Ensors as a separate organization. It now has over 2000 voting members in the Flemish film industry and votes for the Ensor awards each year, operating similar to the 'academy' of the Oscars in the United States

=== Other Festival Awards ===
As of 2025, the Ostend Film Festival gives awards from an international jury in the LOOK!-competition as of 2013 to award Best Film, the COOP!-competition, to award Belgium-Netherlands co-productions, and the SOON!-competition, to recognize new directors first or second films. The is also an audience award voted on by attendees.

The festival also has a short film competition and the Belgian Film Critics Association (UFK) present their UFK Press Awards at the festival.
