= Peter Bouckaert (producer) =

Belgian film and television producer (born 1969)

- Born: May 2, 1969 (age 57); Belgium
- Occupations: Film producer Television producer
- Years active: 1990–present
- Notable work: The Alzheimer Case; Stormforce; Ben X Vermist; Dossier K. The Verdict; De Behandeling; Blind Spot; De Ridder; Eigen Kweek; Cordon; De Bunker; Zie mij graag The Twelve; Chantal; 1985; Juliet; Oh, Otto! Memory of a Killer; Thuis

Peter Bouckaert is a Belgian film and television producer. He is the managing and creative director of Eyeworks Film & TV Drama (Belgium).

== Career ==
=== Film ===
Peter Bouckaert began his career in 1990 as a Press Officer at the Flanders International Film Festival-Ghent. Ten years later, he created a DVD collection of Vlaamse Filmklassiekers for Eyeworks Film & TV Drama, then still known as MMG.

In 2003, he produced Ter Duinen, a historical short film directed by Stijn Coninx. That same year, he co-produced The Alzheimer Case, based on the novel De zaak Alzheimer by Jef Geeraerts and directed by Erik Van Looy. The movie has a big cast which include Jan Decleir, Koen De Bouw and Werner De Smedt. Bouckaert later produced the sequels Dossier K. (2009) and Het tweede gelaat (2017), both directed by Jan Verheyen. All the three movies are part of the Vincke & Verstuyft trilogy. Bouckaert produced the films Stormforce (original Dutch title: Windkracht 10: Koksijde Rescue) (2006), which was directed by Hans Herbots and based on the Flemish TV series Windkracht 10 (1997–1998), Blind (2007) by Tamar van den Dop and the Jan Verheyen's films Vermist (2007) and Los (2008) with the former been the pilot of the Flemish crime drama series Vermist (2008–2016).

In the 2000s, he co-produced Bloedbruiloft (2005) directed by Dominique Deruddere, the Dutch-Belgian Sinterklaas films Winky's Horse (Dutch: Het Paard van Sinterklaas) (2005) and the sequel Where Is Winky's Horse? (Dutch: Waar is het paard van Sinterklaas?) (2007) and Sister Smile (original title: Sœur Sourire) (2009) by Stijn Coninx.

In 2006, filming began on Ben X, Nic Balthazar's directorial debut. This film had its world premiere at the Montreal World Film Festival, where Ben X won three awards. The film also won awards at the Middle East Festival in Abu Dhabi, the Palm Springs International Film Festival, the Sedona International Film Festival, and the International Istanbul Film Festival. Ben X was sold to 45 countries.

In the 2010s, the films Bouckaert produced include Zot van A. (2010) and The Verdict (Dutch: Het vonnis) (2013) by Jan Verheyen, Hotel Swooni (Dutch: Swooni) (2011) by Kaat Beels, Time of My Life (Dutch: Tot altijd) (2012) and Everybody Happy (2016) by Nic Balthazar, Marina (2013) by Stijn Coninx, Image (2014), the feature film directorial debut of Adil El Arbi and Bilall Fallah, Belgian Rhapsody (original title: Brabançonne) (2014) by Vincent Bal, Lee & Cindy C. (2015) by Stany Crets, Achter de wolken (2016) by Cecilia Verheyden and based on the play of the same name by Michael De Cock, Blind Spot (Dutch: Dode hoek) (2017) by Nabil Ben Yadir and D5R: de film by Matthias Temmermans, which is part of the youth soap D5R (2014–2022).

In 2014, he produced the thriller The Treatment (Dutch: De Behandeling), directed by Herbots and based on the novel The Treatment (2001) by Mo Hayder. The film starred Geert Van Rampelberg as Nick Cafmeyer, based on the character Jack Caffery of the novel. A sequel Ritueel, based on the novel Ritual (2008), was released in 2022 with Herbots and Van Rampelberg both returning and Marie Vinck playing the lead role.

In 2018, Bouckaert produced the Stijn Coninx film Niet schieten (English: Don't shoot), a film about the final attack by the Brabant killers (French: Tueurs du Brabant, Dutch: Bende van Nijvel) on the Delhaize department store in Aalst on November 9, 1985.

In 2020s, he produced W817: 8eraf! (2021) by Pietje Horsten, the sequel of the youth sitcom W817 (1999–2003), Zeppos – Het Mercatorspoor (2022) by Douglas Boswell, based on the Flemish youth series Captain Zeppos (Dutch: Kapitein Zeppos) (1964–1969) and the thriller Nachtvlinders (2025) by Indra Siera and based on the novel Le monte-charge by Frédéric Dard.

Some of his co-productions include Bullhead (Dutch: Rundskop) (2011) by Michaël R. Roskam, which was nominated for the Academy Award for Best Foreign Language Film, &Me (2013), Labyrinthus (2014) by Boswell, Two Days, One Night (French: Deux jours, une nuit) (2014) and Tori and Lokita (French: Tori et Lokita) (2022) by the Dardenne brothers, The Ardennes (Dutch: D'Ardennen) (2015) by Robin Pront, Racer and the Jailbird (French: Le Fidèle) by Roskam and Patrick (Dutch: De Patrick) (2019) by Tim Mielants.

More recently, Bouckaert and Eyeworks worked on animated feature films. In 2019, he produced Urbanus: De vuilnisheld, based on the celebrity comic strip Urbanus (Dutch: De avonturen van Urbanus). He later co-produced Tummy Tom and the Lost Teddy Bear (Dutch: Dikkie Dik en de Verdwenen Knuffel) and the sequel Tummy Tom: A New Friend for Tummy Tom (Dutch: Dikkie Dik 2: Een nieuwe vriend voor Dikkie Dik) (both 2024) and Miss Moxy (2025). All the three are Dutch (and Belgian) animated films and the last three that were produced by Burny Bos before his death in 2023.

=== Television ===
Bouckaert also produced several television series for various channels. For VIER, he produced the crime drama series Vermist (2008–2016), which is a follow-up of the film Vermist (2007).

For VRT 1 (formerly known as Eén), he (co-)produced Flikken (2002–2009), Dubbelleven (2010, awarded best drama of 2010 at the Vlaamse Televisie Sterren 2011 (Dutch: Flemish Television Stars 2011)), De Ridder (2013–2016), Eigen Kweek (2013, 2016, 2019; the most-watched TV series of 2013 in Flanders) and its spin-off Chantal (2022–present) and Zie mij graag (English: Please, Love Me) (2017–2020, won the award in 2017 for Best Mini-series at the Seoul International Drama Awards).

For VTM, he produced David (2009–2010), Cordon (2014–2016), De Bunker (2015, 2022), Altijd Prijs (2015) and De infiltrant (2018).

For the children channel Ketnet, Bouckaert produced D5R (2014–2022). De Hoppers (2019–2021) and De Raad van Soekie (2024–present).

For the streaming service Streamz, he produced Niets Te Melden (2020), Styx (2024) and Oh, Otto! (2025).

He also produced Grenslanders (2019) and Red Light (2020–2021), which both are co-productions between Belgium and the Netherlands.

In 2019, the series Instaverliefd en Instagefikst were released. The two are internet series for Instagram by VRT and Kom op tegen Kanker (English: Stand up against Cancer).

One of his biggest TV productions is the anthology series The Twelve (Dutch: De twaalf) which has currently three seasons. The first season De twaalf – De Millenniummoord (English: The Twelve – The Millennium Murder), was broadcast on Eén in late 2019 and the beginning of 2020. The second season De twaalf – De Assepoestermoord (English: The Twelve – The Cinderella Murder), was broadcast on VRT 1 in fall 2023 and the upcoming third season De twaalf – De Botoxmoorden (English: The Twelve – The Botox Murders) was filmed in 2025 and had its world premiere at the Ostend Film Festival (2026). The season (which is a co-production between the Flemish broadcaster VRT and Walloon broadcaster RTBF) will be broadcast on Pickx+ in the summer of 2026 and then on VRT 1 and La Une in the autumn of 2026.

In 2023, Bouckaert produced the television mini-series 1985, the second project about the Brabant killers. The series is also a co-production between VRT and RTBF. The series was nominated for 14 Ensors at the 14th Ensor Awards, winning 10 Ensors including Best Fiction – Series. Later, the crime drama series Juliet was released with its first season in March 2024 and its second season in March 2026. The series takes place in De Haan.

In 2022, it was announced that Eyeworks will take over the production of the soap series Thuis from VRT due to general cost savings. The soap series is produced by Het Thuishuis, a subsidiary of Eyeworks Film & TV Drama. Around March and April 2023, the first episodes produced by Het Thuishuis aired on Eén just before the channel was renamed to VRT 1. Since then, Bouckaert is mentioned in the credits of every seasonfinale as Producent, apart from the returning producers.

Bouckaert and Eyeworks also worked international with Bouckaert been an executive producer of the action thriller Memory (2022), starred Liam Neeson in the same role as Jan Decleir. He was later executive producer of the American television series Memory of a Killer that premiered on Fox on January 25, 2026 and starring Patrick Dempsey. Both productions are based the novel De zaak Alzheimer by Jef Geeraerts and the previous adaptation The Alzheimer Case.

== Filmography ==
Films

Year	English title	Original title	Role	Director	Notes
2003	Ter Duinen	Ter Duinen	Producer	Stijn Coninx	Short film
2003	The Alzheimer Case	De zaak Alzheimer	(Co-)producer	Erik Van Looy	Vincke & Verstuyft trilogy. Belgian entry for Academy Award
2005	Blood wedding	Bloedbruiloft	(Co-)producer	Dominique Deruddere	A German-Belgian coproduction
2005	Winky's Horse	Het Paard van Sinterklaas	Co-producer	Mischa Kamp	A Dutch-Belgian coproduction
2006	Stormforce	Windkracht 10: Koksijde Rescue	Associate producer	Hans Herbots	Follow-up of Windkracht 10
2007	Blind	Blind	Associate producer	Tamar van den Dop	A Dutch-Belgian coproduction
2007	Ben X	Ben X	Producer	Nic Balthazar	Belgian entry for Academy Award
2007	Where Is Winky's Horse?	Waar is het paard van Sinterklaas?	Co-producer	Mischa Kamp	A Dutch-Belgian coproduction
2007	Vermist	Vermist	Producer	Jan Verheyen	Pilot of Vermist
2008	Loose	Los	Producer	Jan Verheyen	
2009	Sister Smile	Sœur Sourire	Co-producer	Stijn Coninx	A Belgian-French coproduction
2009	Dossier K.	Dossier K.	Producer	Jan Verheyen	Vincke & Verstuyft trilogy
2010	Crazy about A.	Zot van A.	Producer	Jan Verheyen	
2011	Bullhead	Rundskop	Co-producer	Michaël R. Roskam	Nominated for Academy Award
2011	Hotel Swooni	Swooni	Producer	Kaat Beels	
2012	Time of My Life	Tot altijd	Producer	Nic Balthazar	
2012	The Bag of Flour	Le Sac de farine	Co-producer	Kadija Leclere	
2013	&ME	&ME	Co-producer	Norbert ter Hall	A European production
2013	The Verdict	Het vonnis	Producer	Jan Verheyen	
2013	Marina	Marina	Producer	Stijn Coninx	
2013	Finn	Finn	(Co-)producer	Frans Weisz	
2014	The Treatment	De Behandeling	Producer	Hans Herbots	
2014	Two Days, One Night	Deux jours, une nuit	Co-producer	the Dardenne brothers (Jean-Pierre Dardenne and Luc Dardenne)	A Belgian-French-Italian coproduction. Belgian entry for Academy Award
2014	Labyrinthus	Labyrinthus	Co-producer	Douglas Boswell	
2014	Wonder Brothers	Wonderbroeders	Co-producer	Johan Timmers	
2014	Image	Image	Producer	Adil El Arbi and Bilall Fallah	
2014	Belgian Rhapsody	Brabançonne	Producer	Vincent Bal	
2015	Lee & Cindy C.	Lee & Cindy C.	Producer	Stany Crets	
2015	Galloping Mind	Galloping Mind	Co-producer	Wim Vandekeybus	A Belgian-Hungarian coproduction
2015	Clean Hands	Schone handen	Co-producer	Tjebbo Penning	
2015	The Ardennes	D'Ardennen	Co-producer	Robin Pront	Belgian entry for Academy Award
2016	Behind the clouds	Achter de wolken	Producer	Cecilia Verheyden	
2016	The Land of the Enlightened	The Land of the Enlightened	Associate producer	Pieter-jan De Pue	Documentary
2016	The Unknown Girl	La Fille inconnue	Co-producer	the Dardenne brothers (Jean-Pierre Dardenne and Luc Dardenne)	A Belgian-French coproduction
2016	Everbody Happy	Everbody Happy	Producer	Nic Balthazar	
2016	Past Imperfect	Le Passé devant nous	Co-producer	Nathalie Teirlinck	A Belgian-Dutch-Danish coproduction
2017	Blind Spot	Dode hoek	Producer	Nabil Ben Yadir	
2017	D5R: The Movie	D5R: de film	Producer	Matthias Temmermans	Part of D5R
2017	Racer and the Jailbird	Le Fidèle	Co-producer	Michaël R. Roskam	Belgian entry for Academy Award
2017	The Second Face	Het tweede gelaat	Producer	Jan Verheyen	Vincke & Verstuyft trilogy
2018	Gangsta	Patser	Thanks	Adil El Arbi and Bilall Fallah	
2018	Open Seas	Niemand in de stad	Co-producer	Michiel van Erp	
2018	Don't Shoot	Niet schieten	Producer, thanks	Stijn Coninx	
2019	Urbanus: The Garbage Hero	Urbanus: De vuilnisheld	Producer	Erik Verkerk, Joost van den Bosch and Vincent Bal (voice director)	
2019	Patrick	De Patrick	Co-producer	Tim Mielants	
2019	Tailgating	Bumperkleef	Co-producer	Lodewijk Crijns	
2021	Red Sandra	Red Sandra	Producer	Jan Verheyen and Lien Willaert	
2021	W817: 8eraf!	W817: 8eraf!	Producer	Pietje Horsten	Follow-up of W817
2021	The Tears of Things	The Tears of Things	Co-producer	Kate Voet	Short film
2022	Zeppos – The Mercator Trail	Zeppos – Het Mercatorspoor	Producer	Douglas Boswell	
2022	Memory	Memory	Executive producer	Martin Campbell	
2022	Tori and Lokita	Tori et Lokita	Co-producer	the Dardenne brothers (Jean-Pierre Dardenne and Luc Dardenne)	A Belgian-French coproduction
2022	Ritual	Ritueel	Producer	Hans Herbots	
2022	Sea of Time	Zee van tijd	Co-producer	Theu Boermans	
2022	Piece of My Heart	Piece of My Heart	Co-producer	Dana Nechushtan	A Dutch-Belgian coproduction
2024	Tummy Tom and the Lost Teddy Bear	Dikkie Dik en de Verdwenen Knuffel	Co-producer	Joost van den Bosch and Erik Verkerk	
2024	A wonderful flaw	Een schitterend gebrek	Co-producer	Michiel van Erp	A Dutch-Belgian-Italian coproduction
2024	Tummy Tom: A New Friend for Tummy Tom	Dikkie Dik 2: Een nieuwe vriend voor Dikkie Dik	Co-producer	Joost van den Bosch and Erik Verkerk	
2025	Miss Moxy	Miss Moxy	Co-producer	Vincent Bal and Wip Vernooij	
2025	Nachtvlinders	Nachtvlinders	Producer	Indra Siera	
TBA	Downtown	Downtown	Producer	Michiel van Erp	

TV Series

Year	English title	Original title	Role	Director(s)	Notes
2002–2009	Flikken	Flikken	Producer	Dirk Corthout, Rik Daniëls, Tom Goris, Peter Rondou and Etienne Vervoort	
2005	Urbain	Urbain	Producer	Hans Herbots	
2008–2016	Vermist	Vermist	Producer	Jan Verheyen, Christophe Van Rompaey, Jakob Verbruggen, Joël Vanhoebrouck, Cecilia Verheyden, Kaat Beels, Kobe Van Steenberghe, Hans Herbots, Wouter Bouvijn and Mathieu Mortelmans	
2009	Jes	Jes	Producer	Nathalie Basteyns and Kaat Beels	
2009–2010	David	David	Producer	Douglas Boswell, Mark Damen, Thomas De Cock, Jeroen Dumoulein and Lien Willaert	
2010	Old Belgium	Oud België	Producer	Indra Siera	
2010	Dag & Nacht: Hotel Eburon	Dag & Nacht: Hotel Eburon	Producer	Geoffrey Enthoven and Filip Van Neyghem	
2010–2011	Double Life	Dubbelleven	Producer	Joël Vanhoebrouck	
2011	The divine monster	Het goddelijke monster	Producer	Hans Herbots	
2011–2012	Rank 1	Rang 1	Producer	Toon Slembrouck	
2013–2016	De Ridder	De Ridder	Producer	Tom Goris, Lars Goeyvaerts, Pieter Van Hees, Hans Van Nuffel and Eric Taelman	
2013	Right or wrong	À tort ou à raison	Producer	Alain Brunard	Season 2 only
2013, 2016, 2019	Eigen Kweek	Eigen kweek	Producer	Joël Vanhoebrouck	
2014, 2016	Cordon	Cordon	Producer	Tim Mielants (season 1) and Eshref Reybrouck (season 2)	
2014–2022	D5R	D5R	Producer	Wim De Smet, Camiel Scheer, David Madder and Mathijs Dekyvere	
2015, 2022	De Bunker	De Bunker	Producer	Jan Verheyen, Joël Vanhoebrouck, Pieter Van Hees, Eshref Reybrouck, Roel Mondelaers, Hans Van Nuffel, Mathieu Mortelmans and Robin Pront	
2015	Always Price	Altijd Prijs	Producer	Douglas Boswell	
2017–2020	Please, Love Me	Zie mij graag	Producer	Toon Slembrouck and Cecilia Verheyden	
2018	The Infiltrator	De infiltrant	Producer	Joël Vanhoebrouck	
2019	Double Life	Double Vie	Co-executive producer	Bruno Deville, Marie Fourquet and Léo Maillard (creators)	
2019	Insta-love	Instaverliefd	Producer	Brecht De Groot	
2019	Instagram fix	Instagefikst	Producer	Brecht De Groot	
2019	Borderlanders	Grenslanders	Producer	Erik de Bruyn and Hendrik Moonen	
2019	The Twelve – The Millennium Murder	De twaalf – De Millenniummoord	Producer	Wouter Bouvijn	
2019–2021	The Hoppers	De Hoppers	Producer	Frederik Sonck	
2020	Nothing to Report	Niets Te Melden	Executive producer	Jeroen Dumoulein	
2020	Me too	Ik u ook	Producer	Frederik Sonck and Brecht De Groot	
2020–2021	Red Light	Red Light	Producer	Wouter Bouvijn and Anke Blondé	
2022	Harmonica (E2, E3 & E4)	Harmonica	Belgian crew: producer	Josephine Bornebusch	
2022–present	Chantal	Chantal	Producer	Jeroen Dumoulein and Senne Dehandschutter (season 2)	
2023	1985	1985	Producer	Wouter Bouvijn and Willem Wallyn (screenwriter)	
2023–present	Thuis	Thuis	Producent	Various directors including Lars Goeyvaerts, Rik Daniëls, Douglas Boswell, Marianne Devriese, Lien Willaert, Toon Slembrouck, Hendrik Moonen and Kim Van Oeteren	
2023	The Twelve – The Cinderella Murder	De twaalf – De Assepoestermoord	Producer	Kaat Beels	
2023	Splinter	Splinter	Producer	Brecht De Groot	
2024	Styx	Styx	Producer	Jeroen Dumoulein	
2024, 2026	Juliet	Juliet	Producer	Anke Blondé	
2024–present	The Council of Soekie	De Raad van Soekie	Producer	Brecht De Groot	
2024	Unresolved	Onopgelost	Co-executive producer	Thomas Korthals Altes and André van Duren	
2025	Oh, Otto!	Oh, Otto!	Producer	Stijn Van Kerkhoven	
2025	United	United	Producer	Nathalie Lippens	
2026–present	Memory of a Killer	Memory of a Killer	Executive producer	Daniel Minahan, David Petrarca, Toa Fraser, John Fawcett, Rebecca Rodriguez	
2026	Tummy Tom and the Lost Teddy Bear	Dikkie Dik en de Verdwenen Knuffel	Co-producer	Joost van den Bosch and Erik Verkerk	
2026	Tummy Tom: A New Friend for Tummy Tom	Dikkie Dik 2: Een nieuwe vriend voor Dikkie Dik	Co-producer	Joost van den Bosch and Erik Verkerk	
2026	The Twelve – The Botox Murders	De twaalf – De Botoxmoorden	Producer	Brecht De Groot	
