= Dossier K. =

- Directed by: Jan Verheyen
- Written by: Carl Joos; Erik Van Looy
- Based on: Dossier K. by Jef Geeraerts
- Produced by: Peter Bouckaert
- Starring: Koen De Bouw; Werner De Smedt
- Release date: 9 December 2009
- Country: Belgium
- Languages: Dutch; Albanian

Dossier K. is a Belgian thriller film directed by Jan Verheyen, based on a novel by Jef Geeraerts. Dossier K. is the second book by Jef Geeraerts for the series about detectives Vincke and Verstuyft that has been put to screen after De zaak Alzheimer. Several actors from the first film reprise their roles, including Koen De Bouw, Werner De Smedt, Hilde De Baerdemaeker, Filip Peters and Jappe Claes. It is a film about crimes in the Albanian mafia scene in Antwerp.

== Plot ==
Nazim Tahiri (Blerim Destani) finds out that his father has been murdered in Antwerp by members of the rival Gaba clan. Kanun, an Albanian law from the 15th century, forces Nazim to take revenge. He goes to Antwerp, where his godfather, Prenk Shehu (R. Kan Albay), leads the family mafia businesses.

Police officer Vincke (Koen De Bouw) is in charge of finding out what is going on in the world of the Albanian mafia clans.

== Cast ==
- Koen De Bouw as Eric Vincke
- Werner De Smedt as Freddy Verstuyft
- Blerim Destani as Nazim Tahiri
- Hilde De Baerdemaeker as Linda de Leenheer
- Greg Timmermans as Wim Cassiers
- Johan Van Assche as Commissaris François Vanparys
- Filip Peeters as Majoor De Keyser
- Jappe Claes as Procureur Marcel Bracke
- Marieke Dilles as Naomi Waldack
- R. Kan Albay as Prenk Shehu
- Vildan Maksuti as Tahir Ukaj
- Stijn Van Opstal as Scientist
- Katelijne Verbeke as Mother Naomi
- Peter Gorissen as Lawyer Waldack
- Sven De Ridder as Balieman
- Kristian Paloka as Zef Shehu
- Ryszard Turbiasz as De Magere
- Fatos Kryeziu as Pjeter Gaba
- Çun Lajqi as Besjan Tahiri
