= Memory of a Killer (TV series) =

2026 American crime drama television series

- Genre: Crime drama
- Created by: Ed Whitmore & Tracey Malone
- Based on: the film De Zaak Alzheimer by; Carl Joos; Erik Van Looy; the novel De Zaak Alzheimer by Jef Geeraerts
- Showrunners: Aaron Zelman; Glenn Kessler
- Starring: Patrick Dempsey; Richard Harmon; Odeya Rush; Peter Gadiot; Daniel David Stewart; Michael Imperioli; Meta Golding
- Music by: Siddhartha Khosla; Jeff Garber
- Country of origin: United States
- Original language: English
- No. of seasons: 1
- No. of episodes: 10

Production
- Executive producers: Martin Campbell; Arthur Sarkissian; Cathy Schulman; Daniel Minahan; Patrick Dempsey; David Schulner; Ed Whitmore; Tracey Malone; Glenn Kessler; Aaron Zelman; Peter Bouckaert
- Producer: Bonnie R. Benwick
- Production locations: Toronto, Ontario, Canada
- Cinematography: Michael Snyman; Kristin Fieldhouse
- Editors: Aaron Marshall; Nicholas Wong; Lara Johnston
- Running time: 41–43 minutes
- Production companies: Eyeworks; Welle Entertainment; Fox Entertainment; Warner Bros. Television

Original release
- Network: Fox
- Release: January 25, 2026 – present

Memory of a Killer is an American crime drama television series created by Ed Whitmore and Tracey Malone that premiered on Fox on January 25, 2026. It is based on the 2003 Belgian film De Zaak Alzheimer and the 1985 novel of the same name. In April 2026, the series was renewed for a second season.

== Premise ==
Angelo Doyle is a contract killer and family man struggling to keep his two lives separate. His worlds begin to collide when an attempt is made on the life of his pregnant daughter, Maria. Angelo often visits his Dementia-ridden brother, Michael, in a memory care facility; there are signs that the disease is starting to affect Angelo as well.

== Cast and characters ==
=== Main ===
- Patrick Dempsey as Angelo Doyle
- Richard Harmon as Joe, Angelo's right-hand man and Dutch's nephew
- Odeya Rush as Maria Doyle, Angelo's pregnant daughter
- Peter Gadiot as Dave
- Daniel David Stewart as Jeff, Maria's husband and Angelo's son in-law
- Michael Imperioli as Dutch, a man who Angelo works for
- Meta Golding as Mel (season 2)

=== Recurring ===
- Michaela McManus as Nicky (season 1), Angelo's love interest
- Richard Clarkin as Michael Doyle, Angelo's older brother who is suffering from Alzheimer's disease and living in a nursing home
- Ian Matthews as Earl Hancock, the man who went to prison for killing Angelo's wife
- Thamela Mpumlwana as Wesley, the assistant of custom bullet maker Belinda
- Gina Torres as Linda Grant (season 1), an FBI agent who is very determined to take down Angelo
- Natalie Zea as Olivia (season 2)

== Episodes ==
No.	Title	Directed by	Written by	Original release date	Prod. code	U.S. viewers (millions)
1	"Pilot"	Daniel Minahan	Teleplay by : Ed Whitmore & Tracey Malone; Television story : Ed Whitmore & Tracey Malone	January 25, 2026	T13.26101	7.39
2	"Ferryman"	David Petrarca	Ed Whitmore & Tracey Malone	January 26, 2026	T13.26102	2.15
3	"Samurai"	David Petrarca	Ed Whitmore & Tracey Malone & Heidi-Marie Ferren	February 2, 2026	T13.26103	1.78
4	"Unhappy Ending"	Toa Fraser	David Schulner	February 9, 2026	T13.26104	1.58
5	"Betrayal"	John Fawcett	Glenise Mullins	February 23, 2026	T13.26105	1.63
6	"Uncle Jacob"	Rebecca Rodriguez	Kat Sieniuc & Jason Lew	March 2, 2026	T13.26106	1.48
7	"Dr. Parks"	Loren Yaconelli	Austin Badgett & Glenise Mullins	March 16, 2026	T13.26107	1.39
8	"Tailored by Fabroni"	Toa Fraser	Jason Lew	March 23, 2026	T13.26108	1.70
9	"Shoot the Piano Player"	Rebecca Rodriguez	Glenn Kessler & Aaron Zelman	March 30, 2026	T13.26109	1.44
10	"Exposed"	James Strong	Glenn Kessler & Aaron Zelman	April 6, 2026	T13.26110	1.52

== Production ==
=== Development ===
On May 12, 2025, Fox gave a straight-to-series order to Memory of a Killer. It is based on the 2003 Belgian film De Zaak Alzheimer. The series is created by Ed Whitmore and Tracey Malone who are also expected to executive produce alongside Cathy Schulman, Arthur Sarkissian, Martin Campbell, and Peter Bouckaert. Production companies involved with producing the series are Warner Bros. Television, Fox Entertainment, Welle Entertainment, and Eyeworks. On July 2, 2025, David Schulner joined the series as an executive producer and co-showrunner alongside Whitmore and Malone. On November 10, 2025, Schulner, Whitmore, and Malone stepped down as co-showrunners and were replaced by Aaron Zelman and Glenn Kessler. On April 6, 2026, Fox renewed the series for a second season, which will premiere on February 1, 2027.

=== Casting ===
Upon the series order announcement, Patrick Dempsey was cast to star. Dempsey also executive produces the series. In July 2025, Michael Imperioli, Richard Harmon, and Odeya Rush joined the cast as series regulars. On August 7, 2025, Daniel David Stewart and Peter Gadiot were cast in starring roles. In September 2025, Michaela McManus and Gina Torres joined the cast in recurring capacities. In July 2026, Meta Golding was cast a series regular while Natalie Zea joined the cast in a recurring role for the second season.

=== Filming ===
Principal photography for the series began on August 18, 2025, and concluded on February 9, 2026 in Toronto, Ontario, Canada.

== Release ==
Memory of a Killer premiered on Fox on January 25, 2026. Australian streaming service Stan acquired the rights to stream the series at the same time as in the United States (January 26 in Australia).

== Reception ==
On the review aggregator website Rotten Tomatoes, the series holds a 45% approval rating based on 11 critic reviews, with an average of rated reviews of 5.2/10. Metacritic, which uses a weighted average, assigned a score of 58 out of 100 based on 9 critics, indicating "mixed or average".
