= The Twelve (Belgian TV series) =

2019 Dutch-language television series

- English-language series poster
- Genre: Drama; Thriller
- Created by: Sanne Nuyens; Bert Van Dael
- Starring: Maaike Cafmeyer; Charlotte De Bruyne; Tom Vermeir; Maaike Neuville
- Country of origin: Belgium
- Original language: Dutch
- No. of seasons: 1
- No. of episodes: 10

Production
- Producers: Peter Bouckaert; Gunter Schmid
- Running time: 50 min.
- Production companies: Eyeworks Film & TV Drama; Vlaamse Radio en Televisie (VRT)

Original release
- Network: Eén
- Release: November 3, 2019 – present

The Twelve (Dutch: De twaalf) is a 2019 Belgian television series created by Sanne Nuyens and Bert Van Dael and starring Maaike Cafmeyer, Charlotte De Bruyne, Tom Vermeir and Maaike Neuville.

== Cast ==
- Maaike Neuville as Delphine Spijkers, one of the jurors
- Charlotte De Bruyne as Holly Ceusters, one of the jurors
- Tom Vermeir as Joeri Cornille, one of the jurors
- Peter Gorissen as Arnold Briers, one of the jurors
- Zouzou Ben Chikha as Carl Destoop, one of the jurors, who is autistic.
- Piet De Praitere as Noël Marinus, one of the jurors
- Maaike Cafmeyer as Frie Palmers, the defendant. Louise DeBisscop plays the younger Frie.
- Anne-Mieke Ruyten as Vera De Block, one of the jurors
- Josse De Pauw as Ari Spaak, Frie's lawyer
- Johan Heldenbergh as Stefaan De Munck, Frie's ex-husband. Aimé Claeys plays the younger Stefaan.
- Greet Verstraete as Margot Tindemans, Stefaan's wife
- Koen De Sutter as Marc Vindevogel, Brechtje's father
- Sophie Decleir as Inge Van Severen, Marc's lawyer
- Mieke De Groote as Mia, president of the court of assizes
- Isabelle van Hecke as Hedwig, the crown prosecutor
- Mungu Cornelis as Fabrice Boks, a TV reporter

=== Supporting cast ===
- Nele Bauwens as Tessa, Carl's wife
- William Boeva as William, Arnold's neighbour
- Spencer Bogart as Davy, Juliette's friend
- Souad Boukhatem as Naïma
- Bart Claeys as Bob, one of the jurors
- Lore Dejonckheere as Leentje, one of the jurors
- Jolente De Keersmaeker as Lutgard, Margot's mother
- Ilse de Koe as Elisabeth Vergote, a cinema employee
- Aminata Demba as Ari's assistant
- Luc De Ruelle as assize messenger
- Gilles De Schryver as Michiel, Holly's friend
- Jane Desmet as Mireille, Arnold's colleague
- Titus De Voogdt as Mike, Delphine's husband
- Sofia Ferry as Juliette Destoop, Carl's autistic daughter
- Sachli Gholamalizad as Cleo Mahieu, a law doctor
- Veerle Malschaert as Yannick, one of the jurors
- Emin Mektepli as Demir Karaca, one of the jurors
- Bart Slegers as Donald Vantomme, a police inspector
- Dominique Van Malder as Björn Cornille, Joeri's brother
- Lino Van Reeth as Kurt, one of the jurors
- Lynn Van Royen as Brechtje Vindevogel, Frie's friend who she is accused of murdering in 2000.
- Ronny Waterschoot as Joeri and Björn's father
- Frank Vercruyssen as Ulrich Steel, Brechtje's teacher
- Bram Verrecas as Ward, one of the jurors
- Sarah Vertongen as Eliane Pascual, a police inspector
- William Willaert as Guy Vanneste, a livestock trader

== Plot ==
Twelve citizens are called for jury duty in an unusual murder case: Frie Palmers is a school headmistress accused of two murders committed many years apart. The first is the murder of her best friend Brechtje on New Years Day 2000, and the second is the killing of her own daughter in 2016. As the trial progresses, each jury member has varied emotional reactions to the events of the case as presented by the prosecutor. It is their difficult job to decide on the guilt or the innocence of the accused.

== Release ==
The Twelve was released on November 3, 2019 on Eén. Netflix picked up the series for streaming in July 2020. In the UK, the series was licensed by Channel 4 as part of its Walter Presents service and is available to stream on All 4.

== Music ==
The soundtrack of this series is written by David Martijn and Jeroen Swinnen.

== Australian adaptation ==
De twaalf was adapted for Australian television, and aired on Foxtel's Fox Showcase from June to August 2022. It features Kate Mulvany, Sam Neill, Marta Dusseldorp and Brendan Cowell. The writing team for the adaptation consisted of Sarah Walker, Bradford Winters, Leah Purcell, Anchuli Felicia King, Tommy Murphy and Greg Waters.
