= Memory (2022 film) =

2022 American film by Martin Campbell

- Theatrical release poster
- Directed by: Martin Campbell
- Screenplay by: Dario Scardapane
- Based on: De Zaak Alzheimer by Jef Geeraerts De Zaak Alzheimer by: Carl Joos; Erik Van Looy
- Produced by: Cathy Schulman; Moshe Diamant; Rupert Maconick; Michael Heimler; Arthur Sarkissian
- Starring: Liam Neeson; Guy Pearce; Monica Bellucci; Taj Atwal; Ray Fearon; Harold Torres
- Cinematography: David Tattersall
- Edited by: Jo Francis
- Music by: Rupert Parkes
- Production companies: Black Bear Pictures; Welle Entertainment; Saville Productions
- Distributed by: Briarcliff Entertainment Open Road Films (United States); STXfilms (International)
- Release date: April 29, 2022
- Running time: 114 minutes
- Country: United States
- Language: English
- Box office: $14 million

Memory is a 2022 American action thriller film starring Liam Neeson as a hitman with early dementia who must go on the run after declining a contract on a young girl. It is directed by Martin Campbell from a screenplay by Dario Scardapane. It is based on the novel De Zaak Alzheimer by Jef Geeraerts and is a remake of the novel's previous adaptation, the Belgian film De Zaak Alzheimer. The film also stars Guy Pearce, Monica Bellucci, Harold Torres, Taj Atwal and Ray Fearon.

Memory was theatrically released in the United States on April 29, 2022, by Open Road Films, and received mostly negative reviews from critics.

== Plot ==
Alex Lewis is a contract killer living in Mexico who suffers from early-onset Alzheimer's and works for Davana Sealman. He is assigned to kill a man in El Paso, Texas, where he grew up and where his brother lives in a nursing home due to severe Alzheimer's disease. The target of the hit is Ellis Van Camp, a builder for the Texas Central Processing Facility. Meanwhile, Vincent Serra of the FBI's Child Exploitation Task Force is undercover in El Paso trying to arrest "Papa Leon," a sex trafficker. Vincent accidentally kills Papa Leon after the latter takes his daughter Beatriz hostage during the sting operation. Beatriz is taken to the Processing Facility, where she had been held previously, before ending up at a group home. Vincent is frustrated that his domestic investigations into trafficking are frequently foiled.

Alex kills Ellis and steals a flash drive from his safe. He finds out his second target is Beatriz, but after breaking into the group home, refuses to kill her as he believes children are "off limits." He threatens William Borden, Davana's lawyer, asking him to cancel the contract on Beatriz. Instead, she is killed by another hitman, Mauricio. The next morning Alex wakes in a hotel room after a one-night stand and sees news of Beatriz's murder. He realizes he is in danger and tells Maya, the woman he is with, to stay in the room before heading for the parking garage. He and Mauricio engage in a shootout, during which Maya is killed as she had followed Alex to return his forgotten Alzheimer pills. Alex kills Mauricio and burns both bodies inside Mauricio's car, and later travels to kill Borden.

Alex retreats to a former bakery once owned by his late father, where he reviews the stolen flash drive and finds footage of Davana's son, Randy, sexually assaulting Beatriz. Randy panics after learning of Borden's death. Davana tells her son to escape, but he first throws a party on his yacht. Vincent and his team, Mexican police detective Hugo Marquez, and Special Agent Linda Amistead, are investigating the Van Camp murder and realize that the recent crimes are connected because Van Camp and Borden were shot with bullets from the same suppressed pistol. They find out that Randy is the owner of the processing facility, Van Camp was the builder, and Borden was Randy's lawyer, realizing that Randy is likely next.

The FBI arrive at the yacht party to save Randy, but Alex kills him first. Outside, he is cornered by Vincent and Marquez but escapes despite Marquez shooting him. Alex recovers inside the bakery but his Alzheimer symptoms are worsening. Narrowly avoiding an FBI raid, Alex infiltrates Davana's penthouse which is heavily guarded by corrupt El Paso police. He shoots his way past several police officers and reaches Davana, but forgets that he had removed the firing pin from his pistol and is knocked out by Detective Danny Mora, who is revealed to be working for Davana. Mora brings him in alive to interrogate him about the flash drive, but another officer tells Mora that Alex needs to be taken to the hospital.

Vincent, Hugo, and Linda receive a package mailed by Alex containing the flash drive. They find Alex under police custody in the hospital where he tells them that he has evidence of Davana threatening Van Camp, but cannot remember where he placed the recording. Davana blackmails her personal doctor into killing Alex, but Alex apprehends him and takes him hostage. The police arrive on scene and mistakenly shoot the hostage, but Alex makes it inside Vincent's car, telling him Davana wishes to bury this (spelling "bury" as "b-e-r-y") before stepping out and being shot dead. Vincent later realizes "b-e-r-y" were the remaining four letters of the sign on the outside the bakery where Alex hid. He finds the recording of Davana threatening Ellis, but is told by the district attorney that the tape is not enough to prosecute. Vincent is told to take some time off. Soon after, Marquez kills Davana by cutting her throat; Vincent and Linda see the news report of her death at a bar. Vincent realizes that Linda took him out to give him an alibi.

== Cast ==
- Liam Neeson as Alex Lewis
- Guy Pearce as Vincent Serra
- Monica Bellucci as Davana Sealman
- Harold Torres as Hugo Marquez
- Taj Atwal as Linda Amistead
- Ray Fearon as Gerald Nussbaum
- Daniel de Bourg as William Borden
- Josh Taylor as Randy Sealman
- Ray Stevenson as Detective Danny Mora
- Mia Sanchez as Beatriz Leon
- Lee Boardman as Mauricio
- Scot Williams as Ellis Van Camp
- Rebecca Calder as Wendy Van Camp
- Stella Stocker as Maya
- Natalie Anderson as Maryanne Borden
- Atanas Srebrev as Dr. Joseph Myers
- Antonio Jaramillo as Papa Leon
- Doug Rao as Andy Villalobos
- Josh Macrena as Howe
- J.R. Esposito as Ballard
- Vlado Mihailov as Coleman
- Sofia Soltess as Emma Van Camp
- Tudor Chirila as Luis Matan
- Marina Krumova as Madera Matan
- Lubomir Buchvarov as Paul
- Sigal Diament as Serena
- Danay Velinova as Marisol
- Louis Mandylor as Drunk Broker
- Jake Tapper as Himself (uncredited)

== Production ==
In February 2020, it was announced that Liam Neeson was going to play an expert assassin with a reputation for discreet precision in Memory, an action thriller film directed by Martin Campbell. In April 2021, principal photography commenced in Bulgaria with Guy Pearce, Monica Bellucci, Harold Torres, Taj Atwal, and Ray Fearon joining the cast. The project is a joint-venture production between Briarcliff Entertainment, Open Road Films, Black Bear Pictures, Welle Entertainment, Saville Productions, and Arthur Sarkissian Productions. Rupert Parkes, who previously worked with Campbell on The Protege, composed the film's score.

== Release ==
Memory was released in the United States by Open Road Films and Briarcliff Entertainment on April 29, 2022.

The film was released for VOD on June 21, 2022, followed by a Blu-ray and DVD release on July 5, 2022.

=== Box office ===
Memory grossed $7.3 million in the United States and Canada, and $6.7 million in other territories, for a worldwide total of $14 million.

In the United States and Canada, the film was projected to gross between $2–5 million from 2,555 theaters in its opening weekend. The film made $1.1 million on its first day and went on to debut to $3.1 million, finishing eighth at the box office. Men made up 51% of the audience during its opening, with those above the age of 25 comprising 84% of ticket sales and those above 45 comprising 46%. The ethnic breakdown of the audience showed that 49% were Caucasian, 20% Hispanic and Latino Americans, 20% African American, and 11% Asian or other. The film earned $1.4 million in its second weekend before dropping out of the box office top ten in its third with $450,038.

=== Critical response ===
On the review aggregator website Rotten Tomatoes, 29% of 100 critics' reviews are positive, with an average rating of 4.8/10. The website's consensus reads: "A pale facsimile of better action-thrillers by star Liam Neeson or director Martin Campbell, Memory proves to be one of their most forgettable efforts yet." Metacritic, which uses a weighted average, assigned the film a score of 41 out of 100, based on 28 critics, indicating "mixed or average" reviews. Audiences polled by PostTrak gave it a 66% positive score, with 49% saying they would definitely recommend it.

Richard Roeper wrote for the Chicago Sun-Times that Memory was "a little more elevated than just another B-movie actioner", that "the 78-year-old Campbell proves he can still direct the hell out of a slick and engrossing thriller", and gave the film three out of four stars.
