= Cordon (TV series) =

Belgian Dutch-language crime drama TV series

- Written by: Carl Joos
- Directed by: Tim Mielants
- Country of origin: Belgium
- Original language: Dutch
- No. of seasons: 2
- No. of episodes: 20

Production
- Producers: Gunter Schmid; Peter Bouckaert
- Production location: Antwerp
- Production company: Eyeworks

Original release
- Release: 10 March 2014

Cordon is a 2014 Belgian Dutch-language drama series in 10 parts. It was first broadcast on VTM. The series was written by Carl Joos, directed by Tim Mielants and produced by Eyeworks. The series was also broadcast in the UK on BBC Four from 28 June to 25 July 2015, in five 2-part installments. An American version, titled Containment, was produced for The CW network and broadcast in 2016.

== Plot ==
Series 1

Cordon begins with the arrival of an illegal Afghan immigrant in a container, in Antwerp, Belgium. Shortly afterward, he visits the fictional National Institute of Infectious Diseases (NIID) in the city to get inoculated against local infections. Police Commissioner Lex Faes is informed by higher authorities that he must arrest the immigrant at his relatives' home. Faes sends his best friend, Inspector Jokke Deelen, to pick up the suspect and take him to NIIDA. However, after the immigrant is in custody, Faes is told the man might have a viral infection, so Jokke is ordered to remain at the center.

Subsequently, the city neighborhood around the center is sealed off from the outside world to contain the virus. Shipping containers are placed across the entrance to all road junctions. Three gates (sluices) control access through which medical supplies and food are sent. Faes is placed in control of the southern section of the cordon. However, adding to his problems is the knowledge that his girlfriend is trapped at her place of work within the cordon.

As people start to become seriously ill with the virus and start dying, public order begins to break down within the containment area. Murder, violence, and theft take hold. Criminals seize control of the food distribution centers while others break into properties or rob from the weak. Meanwhile, a jaded journalist takes the persona The Horsemen, blogging about the unfolding disaster. He soon discovers that the official line coming from Sabine Lommers, the Minister for Health, is not the whole truth. With the help of Faes, he discovers that the virus was not brought into Antwerp by the Afghan immigrant; its origin was more likely NIID, itself.

The series reaches its climax when Faes realises he is being set up by the state's secret service, because his investigations are getting too close to the source of the outbreak. The journalist, whom Faes thought was helping him, admits he's been "gotten to" and has joined the official cover-up of the cause of the virus. Meanwhile, Jokke, who has become disillusioned after seeing so many people he cared for die, rescues a young boy from criminals who are selling his bodily fluids (urine, blood) as a cure because he seems immune. He takes the boy to NIID, where Dr. Cannaerts, the center's professor, says that the boy's natural antibodies are stopping the virus, meaning there might be a cure. However, he tells Jokke, the boy was still infected, meaning the policeman is, too.

As Jokke is dying, Cannaerts confesses. The viral outbreak was caused by one of his trainees, who carelessly opened a package of man-made mutated avian flu from Brazil. Cannaerts admits he should have followed protocols for such a dangerous disease, but it was the pathogen he needed to complete his research (before he took a senior position at the United Nations), so he had it delivered secretly by courier. His work and knowledge of the virus helped the authorities put measures in place to quarantine the area around NIID. Angered by these revelations, and the fact that the doctor has no intentions of admitting his culpability, Jokke attacks Cannaerts, deliberately infecting him.

Faes also discovers that his team has been compromised by a mole who has been feeding information to the criminals inside the cordon. When he finds that the rosters have been changed so part of the cordon has been left unguarded, he joins some soldiers to investigate the district's sewers. Within these tunnels he finds his girlfriend Jana, who is trying to escape. However, he also finds the insider: his own deputy Nald. When the corrupt cop goes for his gun, Faes shoots him down. He then reconciles with Jana. Accepting their fate, they return to the rubbish-strewn streets of the decaying cordon together.

== Cast ==
- Wouter Hendrickx as Jokke Deelen
- Liesa Van der Aa as Jana
- Tom Dewispelaere as Commissioner Lex Faes
- Veerle Baetens as Katja
- Mieke De Groote as Sabine Lommers
- Johan Van Assche as Dr. Cannaerts
- Koen De Sutter as Leo Gryspeerts
- Zoë Thielemans as Ineke
- Ricko Otto as Tyl
- Hugo Van Den Berghe as Bert
- Robbie Cleiren as Ineke's father
- Sven De Ridder as Nald
- Steve Geerts as Toon
- Greet Verstraete as Suzy
- Jelte Blommaert as Quinten
- Frieda Pittoors as Micheline
- Mathijs Scheepers as Bram
- Koen De Bouw as Bob Blyweerts
- Inge Paulussen as Ineke's mother
- Marthe Schneider as Lien
- Geert Van Rampelberg as Sam
- Tibo Vandenborre as Mees
- Jan Hammenecker as bus driver
- Michael Pas as newspaper editor
- Nico Sturm as Dr. Devreese
- Jan Bijvoet as Luc Blyweerts
- Maïthé Foucher as Britney
- Greg Timmermans as Dennis
- Warre Borgmans as director

== Episodes ==
Season 1

| Episode | Original air date | Live viewers |
|---|---|---|
| 1 | 10 March 2014 | 900,801 |
| 2 | 17 March 2014 | 898,858 |
| 3 | 24 March 2014 | 620,710 |
| 4 | 31 March 2014 | 658,301 |
| 5 | 7 April 2014 | 583,701 |
| 6 | 14 April 2014 | 543,545 |
| 7 | 21 April 2014 | 655,487 |
| 8 | 28 April 2014 | 599,181 |
| 9 | 5 May 2014 | 548,419 |
| 10 | 12 May 2014 | 638,334 |

Season 2

| Episode | Original air date | Live viewers |
|---|---|---|
| 1 | 5 September 2016 | 385,066 |
| 2 | 12 September 2016 | 290,015 |
| 3 | 19 September 2016 | 256,000 |
| 4 | 26 September 2016 | 247,170 |
| 5 | 3 October 2016 | 279,000 |
| 6 | 10 October 2016 | Unknown |
| 7 | 17 October 2016 | 173,500 |
| 8 | 24 October 2016 | 178,546 |
| 9 | 31 October 2016 | Unknown |
| 10 | 7 November 2016 | 192,000 |

== Remake ==
On 8 May 2015 Eyeworks, the company that produced the Flemish series, announced that a US-version would be broadcast on the American network The CW. The miniseries, retitled Containment, is set in the US city of Atlanta, and was produced by Julie Plec and directed by David Nutter. The series debuted on April 19, 2016, and was cancelled after one season of 13 episodes; the last aired on July 19, 2016. The series was also aired by the Global Television Network in Canada, and in the UK on E4 (TV channel).
