= Mighty Roosters RC =

Mighty Roosters Rugby Club
- Founded: 2011
- Location: De Haan, Belgium
- Chairman: Thomas van der Bracht
- Coach(es): Kristof De Stickere
- League(s): VR2
Team kit

Mighty Roosters RC is a Belgian rugby club in De Haan.
