= Fata Morgana (game show) =

- Genre: Game show
- Presented by: Steph Goossens; Geena Lisa
- Theme music composer: Peter Van Laet
- Country of origin: Belgium
- Original language: Dutch
- No. of seasons: 5

Production
- Producer: Sultan Sushi

Original release
- Network: Eén
- Release: 20 June 2004 – 31 August 2008

Fata Morgana was a Flemish television show which ran for five series between 2004 and 2008. It could be classified as a game show, though there were no prizes to be won.

Each episode, a local celebrity would issue a series of five themed challenges to a particular town or city, usually tasks which required a great deal of manpower and creativity. The inhabitants of the competing town or city had roughly six days to complete these task, ending in an event on Saturday afternoon where their efforts were judged, and symbolic "gold stars" were awarded for each task successfully completed. Both this event and the preparations during the week were taped and broadcast the following Sunday evening, with the next challenge presented at the end of the programme.

Challenges included breaking world records, assembling masses in a particular style of fancy dress, building scale replicas of monuments, and retrieving items from foreign countries or outer space.

The first series was presented by Geena Lisa and Sergio. The latter left the program in 2007 and was replaced by Steph Goossens for the final two series.
