= Vermist =

Belgian Dutch-language crime drama TV series

- DVD box cover
- Genre: Drama; Police
- Created by: Bas Adriaensen; Philippe De Schepper
- Written by: Bas Adriaensen, Philippe De Schepper (seasons 1 to 10); Bram Renders (season 5)
- Directed by: Jan Verheyen; Christophe Van Rompaey; Jakob Verbruggen; Joël Vanhoebrouck
- Starring: Stan Van Samang, Joke Devynck, Kevin Janssens, Axel Daeseleire, Marieke Dilles, Cathérine Kools, Mathijs Scheepers, Koen De Bouw, Inge Paulussen
- Country of origin: Belgium
- Original language: Dutch
- No. of seasons: 7
- No. of episodes: 70

Production
- Producers: Eyeworks; Peter Bouckaert; Play Media
- Running time: 42–47 minutes

Original release
- Network: VT4; Play More; Vier; RTL 8 Fox/STAR Channel
- Release: 25 March 2008 – 7 April 2016

Vermist is a Dutch-language crime drama produced by Belgian broadcaster VT4 and Dutch production company Eyeworks. It was broadcast on VT4 in Flanders and on Fox in the Netherlands. A French dubbed version called Urgence disparitions was broadcast on W9.

Based on the characters and background of the successful Flemish film Vermist (Missing Persons), the first episode was broadcast on March 25, 2008. The seventh and last season was broadcast in 2016.

The storylines revolve around a team from the Missing Persons Unit (Cel Vermiste Personen) of the Belgian Federal Police, which is responsible for tracking down missing persons.

The series and its actors have been nominated for several television awards, including the Radio and Television Critics Award, Vlaamse Televisie Sterren and the television awards of the Monte-Carlo Television Festival.
