= DV Hasselt =

Belgian volleyball club

- Ground: Stedelijke Sporthal Runkst; Hasselt; Belgium
- Chairman: (Belgium) Dominique Loyens
- Website: Club home page

Dames Volleybal Hasselt is a women's volleyball team from Hasselt, Belgium.

The club played in Ere Divisie, after becoming champions in the 2008-09 season and beating Volley De Haan after playoffs. DV Hasselt had already been active at the highest level, from 1993 to 1996.

At the end of the 2010-11 season, the club announced to retire their Ere Divisie team after several players had chosen to sign for other teams. DV Hasselt will continue their activities with their lower league teams.

== Ere Divisie squad 2010-11 ==
Coach: (Belgium) Hans Bungeneers

#	Nat.	Name
3	(Belgium)	Katrien Gielen
4	(Belgium)	Laura Declerck
5	(Belgium)	Joke Hoeyberghs
6	(Belgium)	Kirsten Vanmalcot
7	(Belgium)	Celine Ieven
8	(Belgium)	Sophie Luyckx
9	(Belgium)	Sarah Gilissen
10	(Belgium)	Natalie Wouters
11	(Belgium)	Aukje Janssen
12	(Belgium)	Elien Van Asch
