= Shades (film) =

1999 film

- Directed by: Erik Van Looy
- Starring: Mickey Rourke
- Music by: Alex Callier
- Release date: 1999
- Country: Belgium

Shades is a 1999 Belgian film directed by Erik Van Looy and written by Van Looy, Paul Breuls and Guy Lee Thys. The story is loosely inspired on the Belgian murderer Freddy Horion and his escape from prison in 1982.

Music for the film was composed by Alex Callier of Belgian band Hooverphonic, who performed the theme of the film.

== Cast ==
- Jan Decleir as Freddy Lebecq
- Mickey Rourke as Paul Sullivan
- Gene Bervoets as Max Vogel
- Andrew Howard as Dylan Cole
- Matthew Hobbs as himself
- Koen De Bouw as Bob
