= The Verdict (2013 film) =

- Directed by: Jan Verheyen
- Written by: Jan Verheyen
- Produced by: Peter Bouckaert
- Starring: Koen De Bouw; Johan Leysen; Veerle Baetens
- Cinematography: Frank van den Eeden
- Edited by: Philippe Ravoet
- Music by: Steve Willaert
- Distributed by: Eyeworks
- Release date: 23 August 2013
- Running time: 100 minutes
- Country: Belgium
- Language: Dutch

The Verdict (Dutch: Het vonnis) is a 2013 Belgian crime film directed by Jan Verheyen that premiered at the Montreal World Film Festival.

== Cast ==
- Koen De Bouw as Luc Segers
- Johan Leysen as Jan de Cock, Segers’ lawyer
- Veerle Baetens as Teugels, De Groot's lawyer
- Jappe Claes as Procureur-Generaal Vanderbiest
- Joke Devynck as Ella De Graeve
- Hendrik Aerts as Kenny De Groot
- Jo De Caluwé as Rechter
