= Juliet (TV series) =

Belgian television crime drama

- Genre: Crime drama
- Created by: Roel Mondelaers, Hilde Vandermeeren,
- Screenplay by: Roel Mondelaers; Hilde Vandermeeren; Tyche Beyens; Rik D’hiet; Wouter Van Haver
- Directed by: Anke Blondé
- Starring: Charlotte De Bruyne; Nabil Mallat; Amber Naert; Nicki von Tempelhoff; Fania Sorel; Mil Sinaeve; Charlotte Vandermeersch; Giulia De Smet; Arend Pinoy
- Original languages: Dutch, French, English
- No. of seasons: 2
- No. of episodes: 12

Production
- Producers: Peter Bouckaert; Nathalie Van Schelvergem
- Running time: 45

Original release
- Network: VRT 1
- Release: 3 March 2024

Juliet is a Belgian television crime drama, which was broadcast from 3 March 2024 on VRT 1. It was created by Roel Mondelaers and Hilde Vandermeeren with all six episodes directed by Anke Blondé. Screenplays were written by Mondelaers, Vandermeeren, Tyche Beyens, Rik D’hiet and Wouter Van Haver. The titular character, a police detective. is portrayed by Charlotte De Bruyne. She returns to De Haan upon the death of her estranged father. While searching for a foster family for her niece, Chloë (Amber Naert), Juliet is assisted by local policeman Jamal (Nabil Mallat) in investigating serious crimes.

== Plot ==
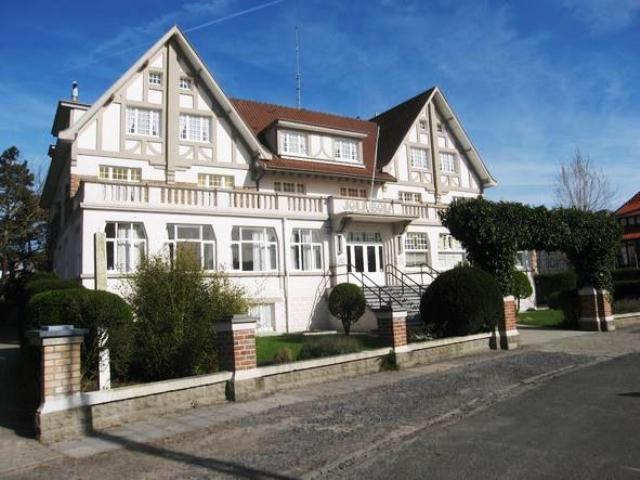
Jean d'Ardennelaan, 9 in De Haan

After her father, Herman dies in De Haan, Juliet, a police detective based in Brussels, returns home to sort out his estate. Her brother Danny has long been estranged and Danny's fourteen-year-old daughter Chloë, was largely raised by Herman. Juliet is temporarily seconded to the local Mid-coast Crime Unit where she teams up with Jamal. Believing herself to be without parental qualities, Juliet expects to return to her social life in Brussels and starts looking for a foster family for her niece Chloë.

== Cast and characters ==
- Charlotte De Bruyne as Juliet Dumon: Brussels-based police detective, Chloë's aunt, temporarily seconded to De Haan
- Nabil Mallat as Jamal Haout: De Haan-based, Mid-coast Crime Unit detective
- Amber Naert as Chloë Dumon: 14-year-old schoolgirl, Juliet's niece, Danny's daughter, raised by her grandfather. Dates "Viktor". Deserted by Danny.
- Nicki von Tempelhoff as Klaus Fiedler: Dumon family's friend
- Fania Sorel as Conny Lefever: Mid-coast Crime Unit superintendent, Jamal's boss
- Mil Sinaeve as Nico: Mid-coast Crime Unit IT expert
- Charlotte Vandermeersch as Trix: Herman's wife, Juliet and Danny's mother; singer in band; died 16 years ago
- Giulia De Smet as Juliet 17 jaar (English: 17 years old): left home after Trix' death
- Arend Pinoy as Jonas: Juliet's ex-boyfriend
- Salomé Crickx as Céline: Juliet's Brussels-based colleague
- Mila Peelman as Juliet 8 jaar (English: 8 years old)
- Pieter Genard as Herman Dumon: Juliet and Danny's father, raised Chloë. Owned unprofitable antique shop
- Maarten Ketels as Danny Dumon: Juliet's brother, Chloë's father, long-term drug user
- Greg Timmermans as Serge Vantorre: holiday park receptionist, Roland's son, thief
- Wennie De Ruyck as Vader Colpaert: digger machine operator, Amber's father, Tania's ex-husband
- Ikram Aoulad as Meyrem Yildiz: television presenter, assault victim, she's been stalked
- Abbas Fasaei as Saïd Fitouri: Cosy Living (furniture business) owner, Freya's husband
- Dolores Bouckaert as Tania Colpaert: Amber's mother, Vader's ex-wife
- Emilie De Roo as Karolien Timmers: Meyrem's sailing friend
- Jul Goossens as Danny 16 jaar (English: 16 years old): Juliet's younger brother, guitarist
- Ben Segers as Carlo Lybaert: Cosy Living employee, Amira's husband
- Piet De Praitere as Koen Delrue: Fleur's father
- Dries Heyneman as Gert Dossche: owns holiday home, neighbouring Meyrem; complainant against Meyrem
- Amara Reta as Amira Fitouri: Saïd's sister, Lia's mother
- Aaron Roggeman as Alex Van Dooren (a.k.a. "Amigo", "Viktor"): 20-year-old, dates underage girls blackmails them into prostitution
- Frederika Del Nero as Evelien: Saïd's sister-in-law
- Tanya Zabarylo as Freya: Evelien's sister, Cosy Living owner
- Dirk van Dijck as Roland Vantorre: holiday park caretaker, Serge's father

== Production ==
Juliet was filmed from October 2022 to January 2023 in the central coast town of De Haan. The Belle Époque villa, which is used as Juliet and Chloé's residence is Villa Ma Normandie, located on the seafront. The Norman-style villa was built in the late 1920s. The police station in the series is actually De Haan's town hall.

== Episode guide ==
No.	Title	Directed by	Written by	Original release date
1	"Parentless" (Ouderloos)	Anke Blondé	Rik D'Hiet, Roel Mondelaers, Hilde Vandermeeren	3 March 2024
Bound, weighted, Amber's dropped into canal; struggles, but drowns. Police attend unidentified corpse. Forensic analyst: 15/16 years, no tattoos, birthmark on neck, head injury from blunt object. Juliet relives Trix' drowning: Trix drove into canal, not revived. Police find Fleur's bracelet nearby. Conny recognises family. Juliet and Jamal visit Fleur's father: daughter at dancing. Fleur identifies Amber's birthmark: they swapped bracelets. Police interview Vader: spent night with girlfriend. Juliet finds Amber's mobile. Social welfare counsellor advises foster family as Chloë's too young to live alone. Juliet searches for Danny. Chloë babysitter for Jonas' children. Amber had lorazepam in bloodstream. Amber's phone shows threats from Thomas. Thomas' father, Gene alibis son. Thomas dumped by Amber. Klaus takes Juliet trawling; Chloë reneges: feigns migraine. Chloë's boyfriend, "Viktor", drives expensive car. Klaus: Herman overwrought when Trix died, poorly handled children; better with Chloë. Klaus: Danny's unreliable cannot care for Chloë. Amber's boyfriend was "Amigo". Lorazepam stolen from Fleur's mother. Amber had new expensive phone. "Amigo" erased digital traces. Gene lied, phone near bar. Police find Gene's gassed himself. Thomas provides USB drive: Gene had sex with Amber, knocked her down. Gene blackmailed, put Amber in car, "Amigo" drove her away. Police research video's location.
2	"Lost Girl" (Verloren meisje)	Anke Blondé	Rik D'Hiet, Roel Mondelaers, Hilde Vandermeeren	10 March 2024
Juliet drives Chloë to visit foster family. Man found Amber's backpack; directs police to dumpster. Foster mum: Chloë ran off. Klaus advises Juliet: wait at home. Danny last arrested in Hamburg. Chloë not answering phone. Conny berates Juliet: unauthorised police searches. Young Juliet listens to Young Danny's guitar; Herman takes guitar. Juliet, Chloë argue over living arrangements. Juliet obtains Danny's email via Hamburg drug rehab. "Viktor" dates Chloë. Police attend Amber's funeral; Amber funded dance troupe's London trip. Koen admits trip payment; recognises building where Amber was assaulted. Jonas: Chloë cancelled babysitting; seen at beachfront. Chloë lies about babysitting; denies boyfriend. Juliet sees "Viktor"'s photo. Juliet remembers Trix' golden rose necklace; Chloë: in Herman's shop. Nico: flat 307 had noise complaints night of murder. Non-resident owner, Lara, on same website as Amber. Police find camera's cord, blood, DNA evidence. Lara: blackmailed into prostitution by boyfriend, Alex. Juliet recognises Alex as "Viktor". Police hunt Chloë. Juliet reaches Chloë, warns her about Alex. Alex drugs Chloë. Nico: Chloë's phone at beachfront. Chloë describes Alex' flat, flicks lights on/off. Alex drags her downstairs. Juliet follows; police arrest Alex. Juliet, Chloë travel to Herman's shop; jewellery gone. Young Juliet cannot free Trix from seatbelt.
3	"The Other Side" (Het andere gezicht)	Anke Blondé	Tyche Beyens, Roel Mondelaers, Hilde Vandermeeren, Michel Sabbe, Wouter Van Haver	17 March 2024
Delivery rider enters opened door, finds Meyrem, unconscious. Juliet asks Klaus to supervise Chloë. Meyrem received severe head wound. Jamal handled Meyrem's stalking case. At scene, no break in, no mobile. Meyrem's neighbours: argument, quiet, then ambulance. Case notes: numerous threats; stalker had stopped. Klaus does not know about Trix' jewellery. Chloë asks about Trix; Juliet's vague. Meyrem cannot remember attack; did not report stalker due to poor progress. Meyrem's colleague admits to practical jokes not stalking. Child Juliet sees Trix performing. Jonas, Laura unable to foster Chloë. While driving Trix grabs Teen Juliet's cigarette, car moves erratically. Teen Juliet argues with Trix. Jamal finds Meyrem's phone. Meyrem's neighbours: person entered flat; Karolien collected Meyrem's pyjamas. Police interview Gert: Meyrem annoyed tenants. Gert monitors children's bedroom. Juliet takes drunken Jonas home; rebuffs his kiss. Child Juliet overhears parents' argument. Restaurateur: Meyrem dated various men; CCTV shows Klaus. Jamal interviews Klaus: met when doing odd jobs; Meyrem defaulted on payments. Klaus had drinks at bar. Juliet checks Klaus' phone data. Jamal, Nico check alibi. Juliet finds Klaus sold Trix' jewellery. Klaus claims Herman gave him jewellery. Juliet alerts Conny about Klaus defensive wounds. Chloë hears Klaus being arrested. Chloë runs off.
4	"A Good Friend" (Een goede vriend)	Anke Blondé	Tyche Beyens, Roel Mondelaers, Hilde Vandermeeren, Michel Sabbe, Wouter Van Haver	24 March 2024
Klaus admits arguing with Meyrem; she scratched him; denies shoving Meyrem against wall. Klaus charged. Nico: Klaus imprisoned in Germany in 1987. Conny: Juliet not allowed to contact Klaus. Juliet video calls Céline and friends. Juliet cannot reveal details to Chloë. Child Juliet plays with Trix. Jonas admits feelings for Juliet. Juliet cannot stay here. Nico: Meyrem phoned Gert, after Klaus left. Gert blocked Meyrem's calls. Neighbours provide video: Meyrem berates neighbours having loud sex, after Klaus left. Klaus sold jewellery for Danny's rehab. Danny often asked Herman for money. Klaus: Danny unsuitable for Chloë. Juliet phones Danny. Young Juliet, Danny hide from Trix. Juliet to Danny: finalize Herman's estate. Chloë, Danny converse. Hospital CCTV shows Karolien wheeling Meyrem out. Meyrem's at marina. Karolien: caring for Meyrem; had taken over stalking her. Meyrem dies; Karolien arrested for stalking, kidnapping. Karolien's alibi checked: not attacker. Teen Juliet swims out of submerged car leaves Trix behind. Neighbours' complainst shows Gert responding before damage reported. Juliet finds Gert's webcam aimed at flats. Video shows Meyrem turning off neighbour's Jacuzzi. Gert admits to grabbing Meyrem's phone; shoving her against wall, left her bleeding. Juliet: Meyrem died. Danny arrives home, hugs Juliet, greets Chloë.
5	"The Prodigal Son" (De verloren zoon)	Anke Blondé	Tyche Beyens, Roel Mondelaers, Hilde Vandermeeren, Wouter Van Haver	31 March 2024
Teen Juliet drops rose into canal, near Trix' memorial. Children find Jeffrey's corpse. He was dragged there, car abandoned on road. Jeffrey rented park's chalet. Roland takes police to chalet 28. Juliet sees drag marks, outside. Blood inside, no forced entry. Forensics: stabbed with sharp object; shoe print. Saïd directs children to neighbouring chalet. Saïd claims: barely knew Jeffrey. Teen Juliet leaves home. Danny: sell house, return to Berlin with Chloë. Danny plays guitar for Chloë. Teen Danny told not to play Trix' music. Park camera: Jeffrey's car leaves at 02:15. Kitchen knife missing from chalet. Social media shows Jeffrey worked for Saïd. Saïd: only couple months; stole from till. Saïd: home with wife. Chloë cooks dinner for Juliet, Danny. Juliet: Jeffrey saw Saïd and Evelien having an affair? Chloë considers moving to Berlin. Roland's shoe matches print. Roland: Serge found bloodstain when stealing from chalet. Serge flees; car has stolen goods. Juliet, Danny argue over rushing Chloë to leave. Serge arrested; Jeffrey's car left before break in. Jeffrey received cash earlier from Saïd. Police arrest Saïd, who denies paying Jeffrey; admits dating Evelien before Freya. Teen Juliet sees Herman crying. Juliet apologises for leaving Danny alone with Herman.
6	"A True Parent" (Een ware ouder)	Anke Blondé	Tyche Beyens, Roel Mondelaers, Hilde Vandermeeren, Wouter Van Haver	7 April 2024
Juliet chides Danny for smoking marijuana. Juliet allows Chloë to ask few friends for farewell dinner. Nico: Saïd, Evalien partying at murder time. Conny: Serge's still suspect. Serge did not enter chalet 27. Juliet notices Amira's necklace in chalet 27 photos. Carlo and Amira swapped chalets with Saïd. Conny: questioning Lia's not allowed. Chloë prepares for party; Juliet brings cake. Danny deserts Chloë; Juliet sends visitors home. Teen Juliet argues with distracted Trix, who drives into canal. Teen Juliet cannot free Trix, who waves her goodbye. Juliet reconciles with Klaus. Klaus: look after Chloë, you are not Trix. Juliet finds Chloë and friend are drunk. Chloë agrees to try fostering. Juliet sifts through Jeffery's effects, finds child's toothbrush, receipt for toy. Amira threw toy away. Lia has similar toothbrush. Nico searches Jeffrey's emails: received DNA results confirming paternity. Police suspect Amira, Carlo. Saïd: Carlo did not know; Amira arrested. Amira paid Jeffery; killed him because he wanted annual payments. Police suspect Amira had accomplice. Carlo runs off with Lia. Police track them to harbour. Juliet sits in Carlo's car; talks him down from driving into bay. Jamal takes Lia. Carlo: Freya helped Amira move corpse. Juliet removes sale sign.
