= Containment (TV series) =

2015 American miniseries

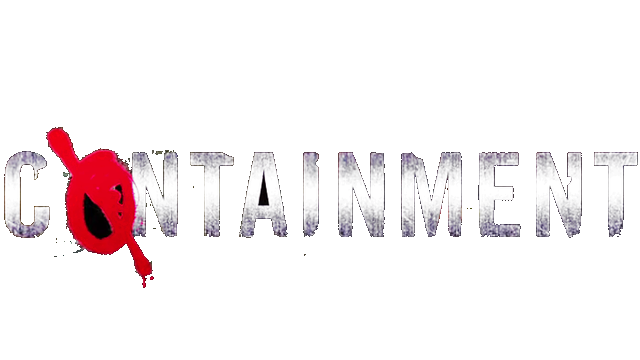
- Genre: Drama
- Based on: Cordon by Carl Joos
- Developed by: Julie Plec
- Starring: David Gyasi; Christina Moses; Chris Wood; Kristen Gutoskie; Claudia Black; George Young; Hanna Mangan-Lawrence; Trevor St. John
- Music by: Michael Suby
- Country of origin: United States
- Original language: English
- No. of seasons: 1
- No. of episodes: 13

Production
- Executive producers: Julie Plec; David Nutter
- Producer: Cyrus Yavneh
- Production locations: Atlanta, Georgia
- Cinematography: Nelson Cragg
- Editor: Paul Karasick
- Camera setup: Single-camera
- Running time: 42 minutes
- Production companies: My So-Called Company; Warner Bros. Television

Original release
- Network: The CW
- Release: April 19 – July 19, 2016

Containment is an American drama limited series, based on the Belgian television series Cordon. The series was officially ordered as a series by The CW on May 7, 2015, and aired from April 19 through July 19, 2016. Julie Plec served as executive producer, alongside David Nutter. The series follows an epidemic that breaks out in Atlanta, leaving a section of the city cordoned off under quarantine and those stuck on the inside fighting for their lives.

On May 12, 2016, The CW announced that Containment would not be renewed and would remain as a limited series.

== Cast and characters ==
=== Main ===
Outside the Containment Zone

- David Gyasi as Major Alex "Lex" Carnahan, an officer of the Atlanta Police Department, boyfriend of Jana and best friend of Jake.
- Claudia Black as Dr. Sabine Lommers, a high ranking Doctor within the CDC who reports directly to POTUS.
- Trevor St. John as Leonard "Leo" Greene, a reporter and conspiracy/truthlighter vlogger.

Inside the Containment Zone

- Christina Moses as Jana Mayfield, a Data Recovery specialist, girlfriend of Lex, and ex-girlfriend of Jake.
- Chris Wood as Officer Jake Riley, an officer of the Atlanta PD and best friend of Lex.
- Kristen Gutoskie as Katie Frank, an Atlanta school teacher and mother of Quentin.
- George Young as Dr. Victor Cannerts, an Infectious Diseases doctor and working with the CDC.
- Hanna Mangan-Lawrence as Teresa Keaton, shop assistant at her mother's grocery store who is heavily pregnant by her boyfriend, Zander.

=== Recurring ===
Outside the Containment Zone

- Gregory Alan Williams as Police Chief Myles Besser
- Miles Doleac as Captain Richard Scott: A National Guard captain in charge of cordon security.
- Scott Parks as Officer Ronan Walden: An officer of the Atlanta PD
- Thom Gossom, Jr. as Roy Carnahan: Lex's father.

Inside the Containment Zone

- Zachary Unger as Quentin Frank: Katie's son.
- Sandra Ellis Lafferty as Micheline Washington: Teresa's grandmother, Leanne's mother and Bert's wife.
- Charles Black as Herbert "Bert/Bertie" Washington: Teresa's grandfather, Micheline's husband and Leanne's step-father.
- Shawn Parsons as Sam Parkes: A building maintenance officer where Jana works.
- Nadine Lewington as Suzy LeFreet: Jana's friend and co-worker.
- Tiffany Morgan as Leanne Keaton: Teresa's mother.
- Robin Spriggs as Harley O'Connor: a menace who tries to rob Leanne's grocery store twice.
- Donielle T. Hansley Jr as Thomas Graham, one of Katie's students.
- Yohance Myles as Dennis Tait, a co-worker of Jana
- John Wincer as Tony Harker, a co-worker of Jana
- Nadej K. Bailey as Britney Cole, a student of Katie's
- Mykel Shannon Jenkins as Trey Cooper, leader of a gang that puts profit before people and the brother of Cinco.
- Jordane Christie as Kelston "Cinco" Cooper, a member of Trey's gang and the brother of Trey.
- Dan Bright as Ray Foreman, the bus driver of Katie's class's field trip and Britney's mother's boyfriend
- Adin Steckler as Mary Katzenberger, one of Katie's students

Originally Outside but now Inside the Containment Zone

- Demetrius Bridges as Zander Paulson: Teresa's boyfriend.
- Jimmy Gonzales as Officer Donald Meese: A controversial police officer.

=== Guest ===
- Ronny Matthew as Sayid Nassir, a Syrian refugee who managed to stowaway on a cargo plane to the States. He is publicly regarded as Patient 0
- Elyse Levesque as Dr. Rita Sanders, a doctor at Atlanta Midtown Hospital and first person to die from the virus
- David McKahan as Henry Burns, the boyfriend of Dr. Sanders and second person to die from the virus.

== Episodes ==
No.	Title	Directed by	Written by	Original release date	Prod. code	US viewers (millions)
1	"Pilot"	David Nutter	Julie Plec	April 19, 2016	296853	1.67
A Syrian man is found to be infected by a highly contagious virus. He infects multiple people, including his doctor and family, and sets in motion a series of events which leads to Zone 6 of Atlanta being quarantined via a cordon sanitaire created by use of shipping containers to block off streets. Government official Dr. Sabine Lommers erects this barrier around Zone 6 to prevent the virus from spreading. She asks police officer Lex Carnahan to stay outside the barrier to maintain calm and become the public face of the virus containment effort in the rest of the city. He eventually accepts, but only in the hopes of learning what is happening inside the quarantined zone, as his girlfriend Jana and his friend and fellow cop Jake are inside.
2	"I to Die, You to Live"	Charles Beeson	Julie Plec	April 26, 2016	3J5952	1.56
Authorities discover that the younger cousin of the Syrian man, now deemed "Patient Zero", had a girlfriend who was likely exposed to the virus. Lex and Dr. Lommers must track her down to see if she has been infected. They use citywide security footage to learn that she is at a teen sleepover somewhere inside the cordon. Meanwhile, the pregnant Teresa wishes to visit her grandmother, who has Parkinson's disease. Before she leaves her mother's store a friend stops by to invite her to a party. Teresa's infected friend exposes her to the virus while hugging and kissing her, and Teresa then takes measures to avoid infecting her grandmother. When the authorities confirm the existence of infected people outside the cordon, they position shipping containers to reinforce the barricade, signifying a somewhat more permanent quarantine.
3	"Be Angry at the Sun"	Charles Beeson	Marguerite MacIntyre	May 3, 2016	3J5953	1.42
While Lex attempts to maintain control outside the cordon, he learns that a young woman, who had close contact with an infected patient, is unaccounted for. With limited resources available, Lex is forced to enlist help from Jake, whose growing resentment towards Lex for getting him trapped inside is causing him to spiral. Meanwhile, Katie must face her students' desperate parents, and Teresa is shaken by a robbery at her mother's store. Furthermore, Leo Greene, a reporter, shows that there is a way out of the cordon, which leads to chaos and the shutdown of all communication inside the cordon, except for that with Dr. Victor Cannerts.
4	"With Silence and Tears"	Chris Grismer	Michael Jones-Morales	May 10, 2016	3J5954	1.35
Lex continues his PR job until he realizes that that is not the job he wants to do. Katie needs medication, and Jake helps retrieve it and supplies for Dr. Cannerts. Jana makes a phone that works inside the cordon; while looking for a signal on the roof, she meets Sam, head of building ops and maintenance. She successfully makes the call, but it stops working after she talks to Lex for a second. Theresa's mother gets robbed again but is saved by a gang that takes over the shop. Xander tries to get into the cordon and, after an unsuccessful attempt, he gets in with Leo's help.
5	"Like a Sheep Among Wolves"	Janice Cooke	Jeff Stetson	May 17, 2016	3J5955	1.28
A food drop is organized inside the cordon. With limited police officers available to oversee the distribution, part of the food is taken by the gang still in charge of Theresa's mother's shop. Meanwhile, Lex is getting fed up with the authorities, and Katie realizes a mismatch in the timeline of events which leads to her figuring out that the people in charge are lying to the public. In the end, Meese is seen inside the cordon talking over a sat phone to a Chief Besser, saying that he made it inside the cordon.
6	"He Stilled the Rising Tumult"	Michael Allowitz	Elizabeth Peterson	May 24, 2016	3J5956	1.40
Jake and Katie leave the hospital to find Thomas. The gang leader shoots a sick member of his gang. Lex and Leo team up, but Lex responds to deal with a squatter. Meese joins the gang. Xander and Theresa escape the shop. Jake and Katie find Thomas. Jake suspects that Thomas is immune when Thomas is exposed to the virus but doesn't get sick. Lex sends a video to Jana for decryption. Jake confesses his love for Katie. Jana lets Xander and Theresa into the office, but the gang takes Leanne hostage.
7	"Inferno"	David Boyd	Matt Corman & Chris Ord	May 31, 2016	3J5957	1.06
8	"There Is a Crack in Everything"	Elliott Lester	Ariella Blejer & Dawn Kamoche	June 14, 2016	3J5958	0.95
9	"A Kingdom Divided Against Itself"	Lance Anderson	Michael Jones-Morales	June 21, 2016	3J5959	0.87
The CDC and the National Guard organize a breach to get a child out of the cordon who may be the key to curing the virus.
10	"A Time to Be Born..."	Carol Banker	Elizabeth Peterson	June 28, 2016	3J5960	0.86
During a press conference Dr. Lommers tells Scott that she wants to trust him and during the conference is asked why she can't tell the truth. Lommers states "America needs to learn the truth" and shows the military men in isolation on camera. Jake finds two dead people in the shower suffocated and wrapped in plastic. He meets up with Lex and tells Jake it's Lommers. It was deduced that Lommers and the Chief are working together. Jake delivers a baby and is excited to tell Katie. While he is talking to her in isolation she coughs blood. Lommers is giving a press conference disclosing that the testing Dr. Victor Cannerts was doing in his lab was not approved by the CDC.
11	"Nothing Gold Can Stay"	Chris Grismer	Julie Plec & Tom Farrell	July 5, 2016	3J5961	0.82
Dr. Lommers blames the virus on Dr. Cannerts, on national television. Katie dies of the virus, with Jake holding her in his arms.
12	"Yes Is the Only Living Thing"	Charles Beeson	Marguerite MacIntyre	July 12, 2016	3J5962	0.78
13	"Path to Paradise"	Charles Beeson	Matt Corman & Chris Ord	July 19, 2016	3J5963	0.85
News media outlets cover Dr. Lommers' scandal, reporting they expect there will be hearings. The two young teenagers get engaged. Lex joins Jana in the cordon. Jake has a funeral releasing Katie's ashes. They find another person who has antibodies against the disease. At the series' conclusion, the cordon sanitaire is still in place.

== Production ==
Filming for the series' pilot episode occurred in February and March 2015 in Atlanta, Georgia. Several locals were cast as extras in various scenes. In October 2015, the series was in regular production in the Atlanta area.

== Broadcast ==
The series was broadcast on the Global Television Network in Canada, on E4 in the UK and on ProSieben in Germany. The limited series was available on Netflix in the United States between October 2016 and October 2021.

== Reception ==
On Metacritic, the series holds an average score of 48% out of 100 based on 20 critics, indicating "mixed or average reviews". Review aggregation website Rotten Tomatoes also reported mixed critical responses, averaging a 53% rating. The website's consensus reads: "Uninspired performances and pedestrian writing make Containment just another in the long line of disaster movie scenarios we've seen played out countless times before."
