= R. Kan Albay =

Flemish film director

- Born: 1 September 1975 (age 50); Namur, Belgium
- Occupation: actor

R. Kan Albay (born 1 September 1975) is a Flemish film director and actor of Turkish descent.

== Filmography ==
=== Directing ===
- Son Care (1996)
- Toothpick, crime (2002)
- The Flemish Vampire, horror (2006)
- Gangsta's hell, horror (2007)
- Coma, drama (2008)

=== Acting ===
- Toothpick, a.k.a. Kahn (2002)
- Emma, 2007
- COMA, a.k.a. Osman Engin (2008)
- Neveneffecten (television)(comedy) (2008)
- Witse (television) (drama) (2009)
- Dossier K(Action-Thriller) (2009)
