= Torpedo (2019 film) =

- Theatrical release poster
- Directed by: Sven Huybrechts
- Screenplay by: Johan Horemans; Sven Huybrechts
- Produced by: Kobe Van Steenberghe; Hendrik Verthé
- Starring: Koen De Bouw; Thure Riefenstein; Ella-June Henrard; Joren Seldeslachts
- Cinematography: Robrecht Heyvaert; Danny Elsen; Kobe Van Steenberghe
- Edited by: Hannes Timmermans
- Music by: Hannes De Maeyer
- Distributed by: Vlaams Audiovisueel Fonds; A Team Productions
- Release date: October 23, 2019 (Locarno)
- Running time: 102 minutes
- Country: Belgium
- Languages: Dutch; French; English; German
- Budget: €3,000,000

Torpedo (Also known as 'U-235') is a 2019 Belgian action & war film directed by Sven Huybrechts and starring Koen De Bouw. The film is loosely based on true events.

== Plot ==
In German-occupied Belgium in 1943, a group of Flemish resistance fighters under the command of Stan fighting for the Allied cause is ordered by Kapitein Maes of the Belgian headquarters in London to travel to the Belgian Congo to operate a captured German U-boat. On arrival the group is told they'll use the submarine to deliver a cargo of Uranium-235 to New York City, for use in the secret Manhattan Project which is creating the first nuclear bomb. Kapitänleutnant Franz Jäger, a captured U-boat commander, is training the resistance fighters to operate the U-boat in exchange for the freedom to see his son again.

Before their training is complete, and while the cargo is loaded, German warships attempt to recapture the U-boat, forcing Maes to depart for the US immediately. Jäger accidentally kills Maes in an argument, leaving Stan in charge. The group is joined by a French-speaking Congolese worker named Jenga, left behind by his employer during the German attack. The untrained crew successfully fight through the Kriegsmarine and overcome other obstacles, such as the flooding of the onboard toilet, as they depart for New York. Filip tells Stan's surviving daughter Nadine that her father was tortured and her mother and baby sibling were murdered by a Gestapo officer named Kirchbaum because he had hidden a Jewish family in his home.

The submarine is stopped by a German destroyer and the resistance crew pretend to be German sailors as a boarding party enters the U-boat. Van Praag, who had both his legs amputated after they were crushed under a fallen torpedo, starts yelling out in pain prompting a German doctor to examine him. Van Praag blows his cover by yelling out in Flemish and is killed with the entire German boarding party in an ensuing firefight. Jäger kills the last German boarder, believing Hitler should never get his hands on their catastrophic cargo. Nadine disables the destroyer with a well-aimed sniper bullet, but can't prevent the ship from ramming the U-boat.

As the U-boat floods, half the crew is trapped in the bow, the other half in the stern, and the U-boat settles on the seabed. Tamme drowns when his wristwatch is caught on pipes and Nadine can't escape a slowly filling compartment whose hatch is blocked. Stan escapes through the torpedo tubes and swims to the compartment where his daughter is drowning. He clears the hatch and successfully resuscitates Nadine. Jäger swims to the flooded command deck and raises the submarine, clutching a picture of his son on which Klisse had drawn a Hitler moustache, as he drowns. While the U-boat ascends, Stan dies from his earlier injuries.

The surviving members of the mission are shown relaxing on a beach in the US, as a radio broadcast announces the surrender of Japan following the use of the atomic bombs on Hiroshima and Nagasaki, marking the end of the Second World War.

== Cast ==
- Koen De Bouw as Stan
- Thure Riefenstein as Kapitänleutnant Franz Jäger
- Ella-June Henrard as Nadine
- Joren Seldeslachts as Filip
- Sven De Ridder as Klisse
- Stefan Perceval as Tamme
- Bert Haelvoet as Fons
- Rudy Mukendi as Jenga
- Gilles De Schryver as Van Praag
- Robrecht Vanden Thoren as Werner
- Vic De Wachter as Kapitein Maes
- Martin Semmelrogge as Kirchbaum
- Steve Geerts as Peter
- Ludwig Hendrickx as German officer

== Reception ==
The movie was compared to other well-known movies such as U-571 (2000), Das Boot (1981), The Hunt for Red October (1990) and Inglourious Basterds (2009) for its similar plot and tropes.
