= Hotel Swooni =

2011 film

- Directed by: Kaat Beels
- Written by: Michel Sabbe; Annelies Verbeke
- Produced by: Gitte Nuyens; Peter Bouckaert
- Starring: Natali Broods
- Cinematography: Frank van den Eeden
- Release date: 24 August 2011
- Running time: 90 minutes
- Country: Belgium
- Languages: Dutch, French

Hotel Swooni (Dutch: Swooni) is a 2011 Belgian drama film directed by Kaat Beels.

== Cast ==
- Natali Broods as Vicky
- Enrique De Roeck as Jens
- Sara de Roo as Anna
- Viviane de Muynck as Violette
- Alexander Provoost as Kissing man
- Isaka Sawadogo as Amadou
- Vigny Tchakouani as Joyeux
- Geert Van Rampelberg as Hendrik
