= Volley De Haan =

Belgian volleyball club

- Ground: Haneveld; De Haan; Belgium
- Chairman: (Belgium) Eric Van Den Broucke
- League: Ere Divisie Dames
- Website: Club home page

Uniforms
Home	Away

Volley De Haan is a women's volleyball team based in De Haan, Belgium. The club was founded in 1968.

The women's A squad currently plays in Ere Divisie, the highest level of the Belgian volleyball league pyramid. In the 2008–09 season, they achieved promotion to this level for the first time in their history, when they defeated penultimate placed Ere Divisie side VC Mosan Yvoir after playoffs. De Haan, champions of 2008–09 champions of First National League B, had missed the opportunity to promote directly after losing the playoffs against DV Hasselt, champions of 1st National League A.

Volley De Haan managed to stay in Ere divisie in the 2010 - 2011 season, thanks to a series of victories in the second round. (za. 22.01 VBC Zandhoven - Volley De Haan A 2-3, za. 29.01 Volley De Haan A - DV Hasselt 3-2, zo. 30.01 Volley De Haan A - Datovoc Tongeren 3-1).

ERE AFDELING DAMES 2010 - 2011

1.Asterix Kieldrecht 63 2.VDK Gent Dames 56 3.Dauphines Charleroi 50 4. Hermes Volley Oostende 46 5.Richa Michelbeke 35 6.Datovoc Tongeren 31 7.Gea Happel Amigos Zoersel 30 8.VC Oudegem 29 9.VBC Zandhoven 20 10.Volley De Haan 14 11.DV Hasselt 14 12.VBK Smash Oud-Turnhout 8

Volley De Haan also has a B and C squad playing in the lower provincial leagues.

The club hosts a friendly international volleyball tournament each season.

== Current squad 2011 - 2012 ==
Coach: (Belgium) ????
Ass. Coach: (Belgium) Wim Ogiers
Scouting: (Belgium) Luc Vermeersch

#	Nat.	Name
1	(Belgium)	Alison Van Renterghem
2	(Belgium)	Emily Van Renterghem
3	(Belgium)	Céline Carpentier
4	(Belgium)	Delfien Brugman
5	(United States)	Tania Schatow
6	(Belgium)	Bieke Huyst
7	(United States)	Kathleen Hruska
8	(Belgium)	Renke Brys
9	(Belgium)	Hanne Van Laethem
10	(Belgium)	Elke Meert
11	(Belgium)	Ilka Gyselen
13	(Belgium)	Dotje Maekelberg
