= Stormforce =

2006 film

- Theatrical Poster
- Windkracht 10: Koksijde Rescue
- Directed by: Hans Herbots
- Screenplay by: Pierre De Clercq
- Produced by: Hilde De Laere, Erwin Provoost
- Starring: Kevin Janssens; Veerle Baetens; Koen de Bouw; Axel Daeseleire
- Distributed by: Kinepolis Film Distribution; Drafthouse Films
- Release date: 18 January 2007
- Running time: 117 minutes
- Country: Belgium
- Language: Dutch

Stormforce (original Dutch title: Windkracht 10: Koksijde Rescue, literally Gale force 10: Koksijde Rescue) is a 2006 Belgian film directed by Hans Herbots. The screenplay was written by Pierre De Clercq.

The film was based on the Flemish TV series Windkracht 10.

== Cast ==
- Veerle Baetens as Alex Breynaert
- François Beukelaers as General Cassiman
- Warre Borgmans as Jean Louis Hubert De Jonghe
- Ludo Busschots as Patrick Adams
- Jelle Cleymans as Bert Gorissen
- Jaela Cole as Yvonne
- Axel Daeseleire as Koen
- Koen De Bouw as Mark Van Houte
- Vic de Wachter as Bob Govaerts
- Eric Godon as the Defence minister
- Kevin Janssens as Rick Symons
- Tine Reymer as Marleen
- Stan Van Samang as Serge Helsen
- Nicolas Gob as Tigris Sailor
