= Koen De Bouw =

Belgian actor (born 1964)

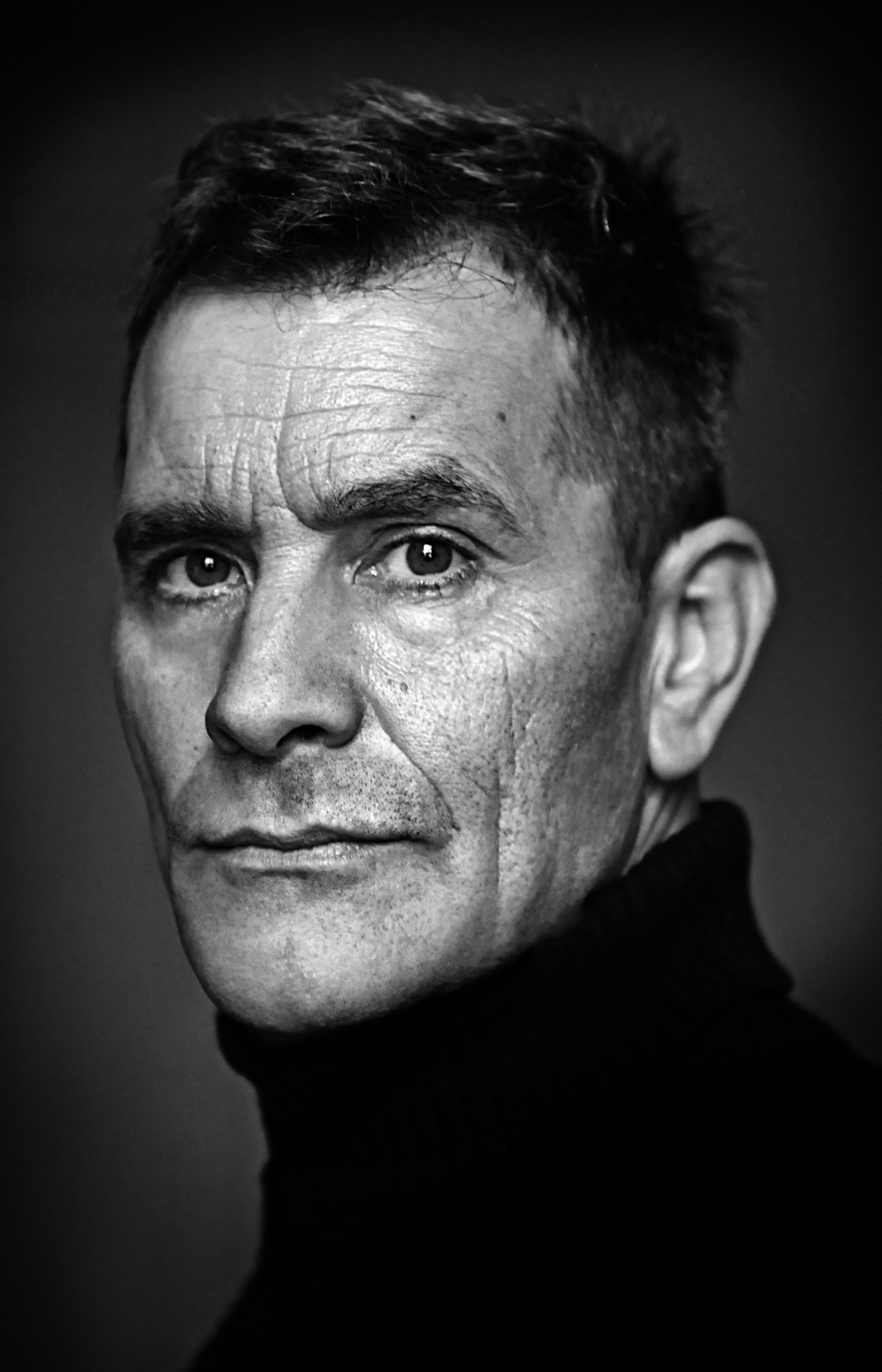
- Portrait
- Born: 30 September 1964 (age 61); Turnhout, Belgium
- Education: Studio Herman Teirlinck
- Occupation: Actor
- Spouse: Chantal Leyers
- Children: 2

Koen De Bouw (born 30 September 1964 in Turnhout) is a Belgian actor.

He trained to be an actor at Studio Herman Teirlinck in Antwerp and made his breakthrough in Belgium with his role of serial killer Stef Tavernier in the TV-series Wittekerke. He played the role from 1995 until 1996.

In 2003 he was the protagonist in the thriller The Alzheimer Case. In 2005 De Bouw played the main character in movies as De Indringer en Verlengd weekend. That summer he went to Cuba for three months to make Koning van de wereld. From January 2006 on the actor worked at the movies Stormforce and Dossier K., the successor of The Alzheimer Case. In 2008 he appeared in the original version of the movie Loft (with a script written by Bart De Pauw and Erik Van Looy). During the same period he appeared in Germany in Love Hurts and Falling Rocks directed by Peter Keglevic,

Koen De Bouw is also active in the theatre. He regularly made shows with Jan Decorte (Amlett, In het kreupelhout and O Death) in Het Toneelhuis. In the Raamtheater he could be seen in the play Trojaanse Vrouwen and later also Una Giornata Particolare (after the movie of the same name), in which he played a tormented homosexual under the fascist regime of Mussolini.

Apart from acting, De Bouw has also presented the gardening programme Groene Vingers on vtm from 2007 till 2011.

== Filmography ==
- Reflection in a Dead Diamond (2025)
- The Man Who Sold His Skin (2020)
- President Under Siege (2016) - Michel de Vreese (the premier)
- Torpedo (2019 film) - Stan
- Het vonnis (2013) - Luc Segers
- Brasserie Romantiek (2012) - Frank
- Groenten uit Balen (2011) - Mijnheer Verheyen
- Smoorverliefd (2010) - Bert
- Terug naar de kust (2009) Harry
- Dossier K. (2009) - Eric Vincke
- Loft (2008) - Chris Van Outryve
- Vermist (2007) - Walter Sibelius
- Stormforce (2006) - Mark Van Houte
- Verlengd weekend (2005) - Christian Van den Heuvel
- De Indringer (2005) - Tom Vansant
- Knokke Boulevard (2005, short film)
- Love Hurts (2004, TV) - Klaus
- The Alzheimer Case (2003) - Eric Vincke
- Science Fiction (2002) - Rick Decker
- Bella Bettien (2002) - Velibor
- Vallen (2001) - Benoit
- Lijmen/Het Been (2000) - Frans Laarmans
- Falling Rocks (2000) - Phil
- Shades (1999) - Bob
- Left Luggage (1998) - Father Chaya (at age of 20)
- Straffe koffie (1997, short film)
- Minder dood dan de anderen (1992) - Broer
- Eline Vere (1991) - Paul van Raat
- Yuppies (1991, short film)
- Han de Wit (1990) - Han de Wit
- Caught (1986, short film)
- The Last Front (TBA) - Dr. Janssen

=== TV series ===
- Styx (2024)
- Grenslanders (2019)
- The Last Tycoon (2016)
- The Team (2015)
- Professor T. (2015-2018)
- Deadline 25/5 (2014) -
- Vermist (2008–2010, 2014) - Walter Sibelius
- Salamander (2012–2013) - Klaus
- Los Zand (2009) - Willem
- Koning van de wereld
- Sedes & Belli (2002–2003) - Frank Sedes
- Stille Waters (2001–2002) - Rob
- Engeltjes (1999)
- Windkracht 10 (1998) - Mark Van Houte
- De Jacques Vermeire show (1998)
- Thuis (1996–1997) - Lou Swertvaeghers
- Wittekerke (1995–1996) - Stef Tavernier
- Ons geluk (1995)
- Moeder, waarom leven wij? (1993)

=== Guest roles ===
- Rupel - Peter Huybrechts (Season 1 ep. 13 & 18)
- Baantjer - Francesco Fiorini (Season 7 ep. 7)
- Recht op Recht - Dennis Moerman (Season 3 ep. 1)
- Flikken - Erik Francken (Season 1 ep. 3 & 4 & 7 & 10)
- Windkracht 10 - lieutenant SIE (1st series, ep. 5)
- Deman - Mario Tytgat (ep. Duivelse minnaars)
- F.C. De Kampioenen - Wouter Smeets (Season 2 ep. 6)
- Langs de kade - Dokter (Season 1 ep. 6)
- Witse - Dirk Nuyens (Season 5 ep. 9), Peter Claessens (Season 8 ep. 12–13)
- Aspe - Maarten Box (Season 3 ep. 2)
- Heterdaad - Kurt Van Campenhout (Season 4 ep. 9–10)
- Bullets (2018) – "Oligarch" (2 episodes)

== Theatre ==
- Una giornata particolare (2006–2008)
- Trojaanse vrouwen (2005–2007)
- De wet van engel (2003–2006)
- O Death (2003–2004)
- Poes, poes, poes (1, 2, 3, 4, 5) (2002–2004)
- Amlett/Hamlet (2000–2002)
- Marieslijk (1999–2000)
- 3 Koningen (1993–1994)
