= The Alzheimer Case =

2003 film

- Theatrical release poster
- Dutch: De zaak Alzheimer
- Directed by: Erik Van Looy
- Screenplay by: Erik Van Looy; Carl Joos
- Based on: De zaak Alzheimer by Jef Geeraerts
- Starring: Jan Decleir; Koen De Bouw; Werner De Smedt
- Cinematography: Danny Elsen
- Edited by: Yoohan Leyssens; Philippe Ravoet
- Music by: Stephen Warbeck
- Distributed by: Kinepolis Film Distribution
- Release dates: 7 October 2003 (Ghent Film Festival); 15 October 2003 (Belgium)
- Running time: 123 minutes
- Country: Belgium
- Language: Dutch

The Alzheimer Case (also known as The Alzheimer Affair or The Memory of a Killer; Dutch: De zaak Alzheimer) is a 2003 Belgian action thriller film directed by Erik Van Looy, based on the novel De zaak Alzheimer by Jef Geeraerts. It follows an assassin with Alzheimer's disease, who plans to retire but ends up becoming a target himself after he refuses to kill a young girl.

== Plot ==
Angelo Ledda, a former hitman for organized crime, agrees to one last contract, despite his recently developed Alzheimer's disease. He is to kill two people; on killing the first and recovering a package from the first victim, he then learns the second victim is Bieke, a twelve-year-old girl pimped by her father, who had been recently busted but then killed by police trying to escape. Ledda refuses to kill a child. As a result, his employer, Seynaeve, has another hitman kill Bieke and orders him to kill Ledda. Ledda kills the hitman first but only after the hitman kills a prostitute who had befriended him.

Ledda decides to kill Seynaeve. He also reviews the contents of the package, and discovers that his employer had Bieke and the first target killed to cover for several individuals who had used the services of the child. He decides to clean house by killing them all, several of whom are high-ranking government officials. Ledda's Alzheimer's condition (for which he takes an experimental drug) periodically impacts him throughout the movie, resulting in disorientation and his being seemingly forgetful of what he was doing for a brief period of time. It grows worse as the film progresses.

In his attempts to seek revenge upon his employers, Ledda contends with police pursuit. Two detectives in particular (Vincke and Verstuyft) seem to be one step behind him. Ledda toys with the police, although he ends up with a gunshot wound to the arm from Verstuyft after attempting to talk to Vincke at one point.

Ledda kills all of his intended targets, except the last, a high-ranking government official, Baron de Haeck, who manages to get away because of Ledda's worsening Alzheimer's, which leads him to forget to put the firing pin in his silenced pistol when preparing for the hit.

Ledda is captured by the police, and between his worsening mental condition and his gunshot wound, is bed-ridden and in poor health. The prosecutor, Bracke, who is in the pocket of the Baron, tries to have a court-appointed psychiatrist kill Ledda, which results in Ledda making a hasty escape. Ledda ends up meeting the two detectives in a car, and gives them a clue as to the whereabouts of a tape from the safety deposit box which implicates the Baron in murder.

The corrupt police close in and surround the car, placing all inside at risk. Ledda decides to sacrifice himself by making a run from the car, and is gunned down. The movie ends with the detectives finding the tape and watching the Baron getting arrested.

== Cast ==
- Jan Decleir as Angelo Ledda
- Koen De Bouw as Det. Eric Vincke
- Werner De Smedt as Det. Freddy Verstuyft
- Jo De Meyere as Baron Henri Gustave de Haeck
- Tom Van Dyck as Jean de Haeck
- Vic de Wachter as Dr. Joseph Vlerick
- Hilde De Baerdemaeker as Det. Linda de Leenheer
- Geert Van Rampelberg as Det. Tom Coemans
- Johan Van Assche as Comm. François Van Parys
- Jappe Claes as Prosecutor Marcel Bracke
- Gene Bervoets as Seynaeve
- Lone van Roosendaal as Henriette Seynaeve
- Lucas van den Eijnde as Bob Van Camp
- Els Dottermans as Eva Van Camp
- Patrick Descamps as Gilles Resnais
- Deborah Ostrega as Anja Laeremans
- Laurien Van den Broeck as Brigitte 'Bieke' Cuypers
- Dirk Roothooft as Mr. Cuypers

== Reception ==
The film holds an 84% approval rating on review aggregator Rotten Tomatoes, with 68 reviews tallied. The critical consensus statement reads: "Even though The Memory of a Killer is standard genre fare, it is also engaging and stylish."

Roger Ebert gave the film three and a half stars out of four, praising the performance of Decleir, whom he compared to Anthony Quinn.

== Adaptations ==
An American remake of the film Memory directed by Martin Campbell and starring Liam Neeson was theatrically released in the United States on April 29, 2022, by Open Road Films.

In May 2025, an American series adaptation of the film Memory of a Killer was ordered by Fox, from writers Ed Whitmore and Tracey Malone, starring Patrick Dempsey. The series premiered on January 25, 2026.

== See also ==
- List of Belgian submissions for Academy Award for Best Foreign Language Film
