= VRT 1 =

Belgian Dutch-language TV channel

- Current Logo Since May 2023
- Country: Belgium
- Broadcast area: Belgium, reaching bordering regions via overspill of the Belgian terrestrial network
- Headquarters: Brussels

Programming
- Language: Dutch
- Picture format: 1080i HDTV (downscaled to 16:9 576i for the SDTV feed)

Ownership
- Owner: VRT
- Sister channels: VRT Canvas; Ketnet

History
- Launched: 1953; 73 years ago
- Former names: NIR TV (1953–1960); BRT (1960–1977); TV1 (1977–2005); Één (2005–2023)

Links
- Website: www.een.be

Availability

Terrestrial
- Antenne TV: Mux 2 (SD)
- Digitenne (Netherlands): Channel 14 (HD)

Streaming media
- VRT MAX: Watch live (Belgium only)
- Telenet TV: Watch live (HD)
- Yelo Play: Watch live (HD)
- Proximus Pickx: Watch live (HD - Belgium only)
- Ziggo GO (Netherlands): ZiggoGO.tv (Europe only)

VRT 1 (VRT een) is a public Dutch-language TV station in Belgium, owned by the VRT, which also owns Ketnet, VRT Canvas and several radio stations. Although the channel is commercial-free, short sponsorship messages are sometimes broadcast in between some programmes.

VRT 1 focuses on drama, entertainment, news and current affairs in a similar vein to BBC One in the United Kingdom. The station was formerly known as TV1 until 21 January 2005, when the Eén (English: "one") branding was launched as part of a major station revamp, with a look created by BBC Broadcast. The channel got its current branding in 2023, which was done by Gédéon Communications

VRT 1 is the equivalent of its French-language counterpart, La Une, the first channel of the Belgian Francophone broadcaster, RTBF.

== On-screen presentation ==
=== Continuity ===
With its sister channel Ketnet, Eén was one of 21 stations in Europe to utilise in-vision continuity presentation. Four regular staff announcers (as of January 2014) were presenting in-vision and out-of-vision links from lunchtime until around midnight or in the early hours (if necessary) each day.

The last team of announcers was composed of:

- Andrea Croonenberghs (senior announcer)
- Geena Lisa Peeters
- Eva Daeleman
- Saartje Vandendriessche

The in-vision presentation was ditched on 26 July 2015. Since that day, it is replaced by out-of-vision continuity.

=== Seasonal identity ===
As of its 2007 rebrand as één, the channel uses different idents, logos, blips and a different colour scheme every season. This seasonality concept was abolished when Eén got a new look, created by Gédéon Communications, in early 2009.

== Logo history ==
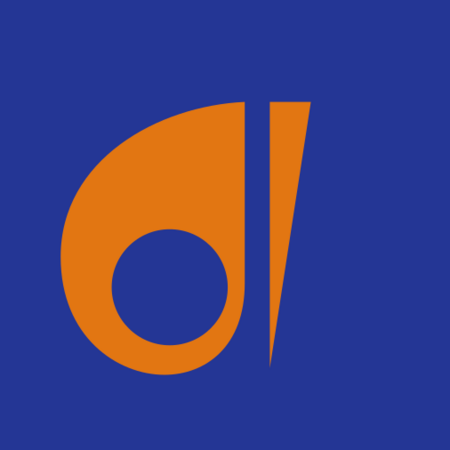
TV 1's third logo (1977–1982)

TV 1's fourth logo (1982–1988)

TV 1's fifth logo (1988–1990)

TV 1's sixth logo (1991–1995)

TV 1's seventh logo (1995–1997)

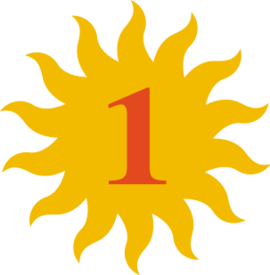
TV 1's eighth logo (1997–2001). A variation of this one continued to be used until 20 January 2005.

Eén's red logo used during winter (2007-2009)

Eén's green logo used during spring (2007-2008)

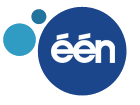
Eén's blue logo used during summer (2007-2008)

Eén's simplified white logo (February 2009-August 2015)

Eén's light blue written-style logo (August 2015-September 2019)

Eén's last logo before rebrand (September 2019-April 2023)

== Programming ==
Foreign language programmes and segments of local TV programmes with foreign language dialogue (e.g. interviews with people speaking in other languages) are shown with Dutch subtitles.

=== Belgian ===
- 1000 Zonnen
- Blokken
- Dans Mondial
- Debby and Nancy's Happy Hour
- De bedenkers
- De Laaste Show
- De Pappenheimers
- De Rode Loper
- De Slimste Mens ter Wereld
- De Zevende Dag
- Eurosong
- Fata Morgana
- F.C. De Kampioenen
- Gentse Waterzooi
- Juliet
- Koppen
- Knokke Off
- Man Bijt Hond
- Peter Live
- Professor T.
- Salamander
- Sorry voor alles
- Sportweekend
- Studio 1
- Thuis
- Tomtesterom
- Tour
- Villa Politica
- Vlaanderen Vakantieland
- Volt
- VRT NWS Journaal
- Witse

=== International ===
- 'Allo 'Allo!
- 3rd Rock from the Sun
- Agatha Christie's Poirot
- Are You Being Served?
- Bergerac
- The Bill
- The Border
- Desperate Housewives
- Doc Martin
- Doctor Who
- Downton Abbey
- How to Get Away with Murder
- The Last Ship
- Married... with Children
- MasterChef
- MasterChef Australia
- Merseybeat
- Midsomer Murders
- Miranda
- The Missing
- Monarch of the Glen
- The Musketeers
- The Nanny
- Neighbours
- The Player
- Primeval
- Psi Factor
- The Saint
- Scott & Bailey
- Sea Patrol
- S1NGLE
- Sold
- Van der Valk
- Versailles
- Victoria

== Teletext ==
VRT started its teletext service on 8 May 1980 and stopped it on 1 June 2016. The page 888 is still available for subtitles. The service was used by 576,094 persons per day in 2010. The number dropped down to 123,709 in 2014.
