= De Haan, Belgium =

De Haan
- Municipality
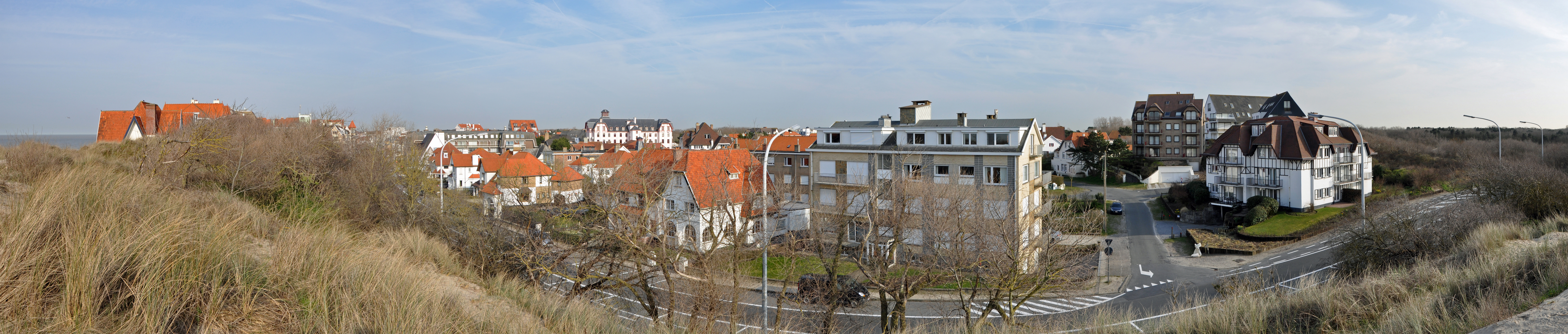

- Flag Coat of arms

- Location of De Haan in West Flanders
- Interactive map of De Haan
- Location in Belgium
- Coordinates: 51°16′21.097″N 03°02′1.427″E
- Country: Belgium
- Community: Flemish Community
- Region: Flemish Region
- Province: West Flanders
- Arrondissement: Ostend

Government
  - Mayor: Wilfried Vandaele (N-VA)
  - Governing parties: Open VLD & N-VA, Vooruit!

Area
  - Total: 46.14 km^{2} (17.81 sq mi)

Population (2018-01-01)
  - Total: 12,635
  - Density: 273.8/km^{2} (709.2/sq mi)
- Postal codes: 8420, 8421
- NIS code: 35029
- Area codes: 059 - 050
- Website: www.dehaan.be

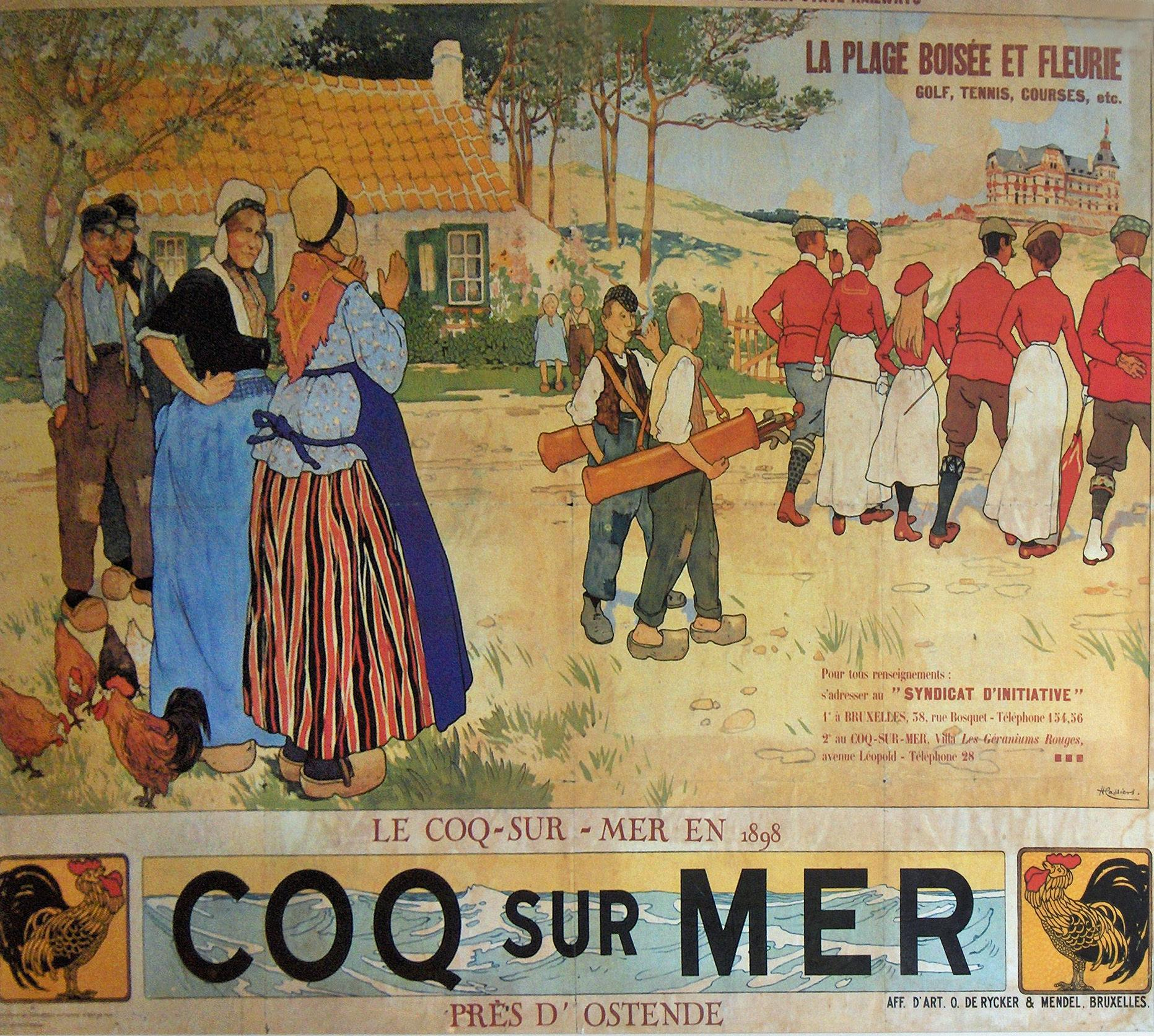
Poster "« Le Coq-sur-Mer » by Henri Cassiers (1898)

De Haan (Dutch pronunciation: [də ˈɦaːn]; French: Le Coq, French pronunciation: [lə kɔk]; West Flemish: D'n Oane; English: The Cock or Cockerel; (USA/Canada) Rooster) is a place and a municipality located in the Belgian province of West Flanders. The municipality comprises the villages of De Haan proper, Wenduine, Klemskerke, Vlissegem and Harendijk. On January 1, 2020 De Haan had a total population of 12,700. The total area is 46.14 km^{2} (26.2 Miles) which gives a population density of 275.26 inhabitants per km^{2}.

The coastal village of De Haan proper has maintained a low skyline so its many buildings in Belle Époque style are still prominently visible.

The town has an 18-hole golf course situated in its dunes, founded by King Leopold II in 1903. Today, it is the only links course in the country.

Its most famous resident was Albert Einstein, who lived in the villa "Savoyarde" for six months in 1933 after leaving Nazi Germany. Belgian TV crime drama series, Juliet (2024), was filmed and set in De Haan.

== Photo gallery ==
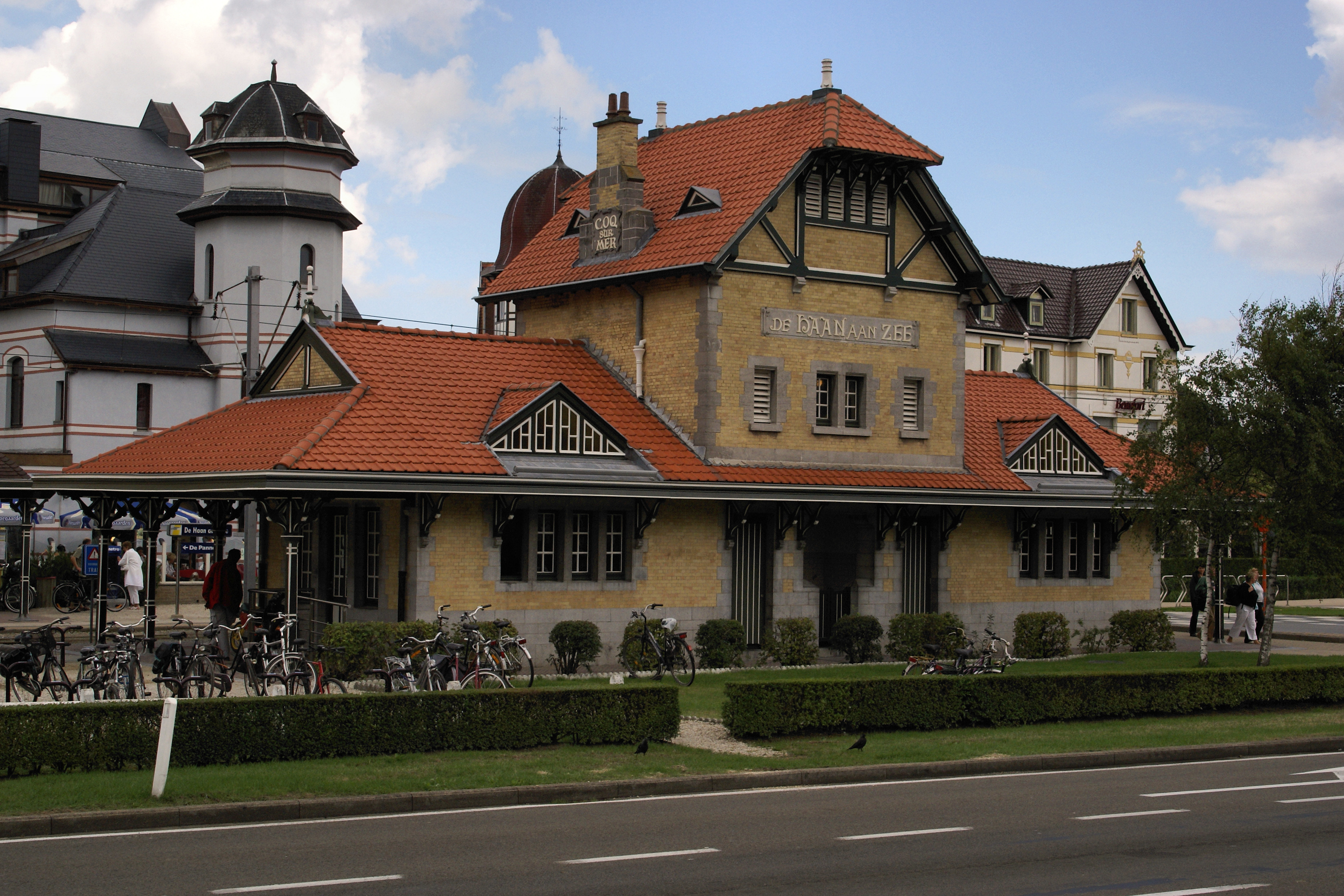
Tram stop

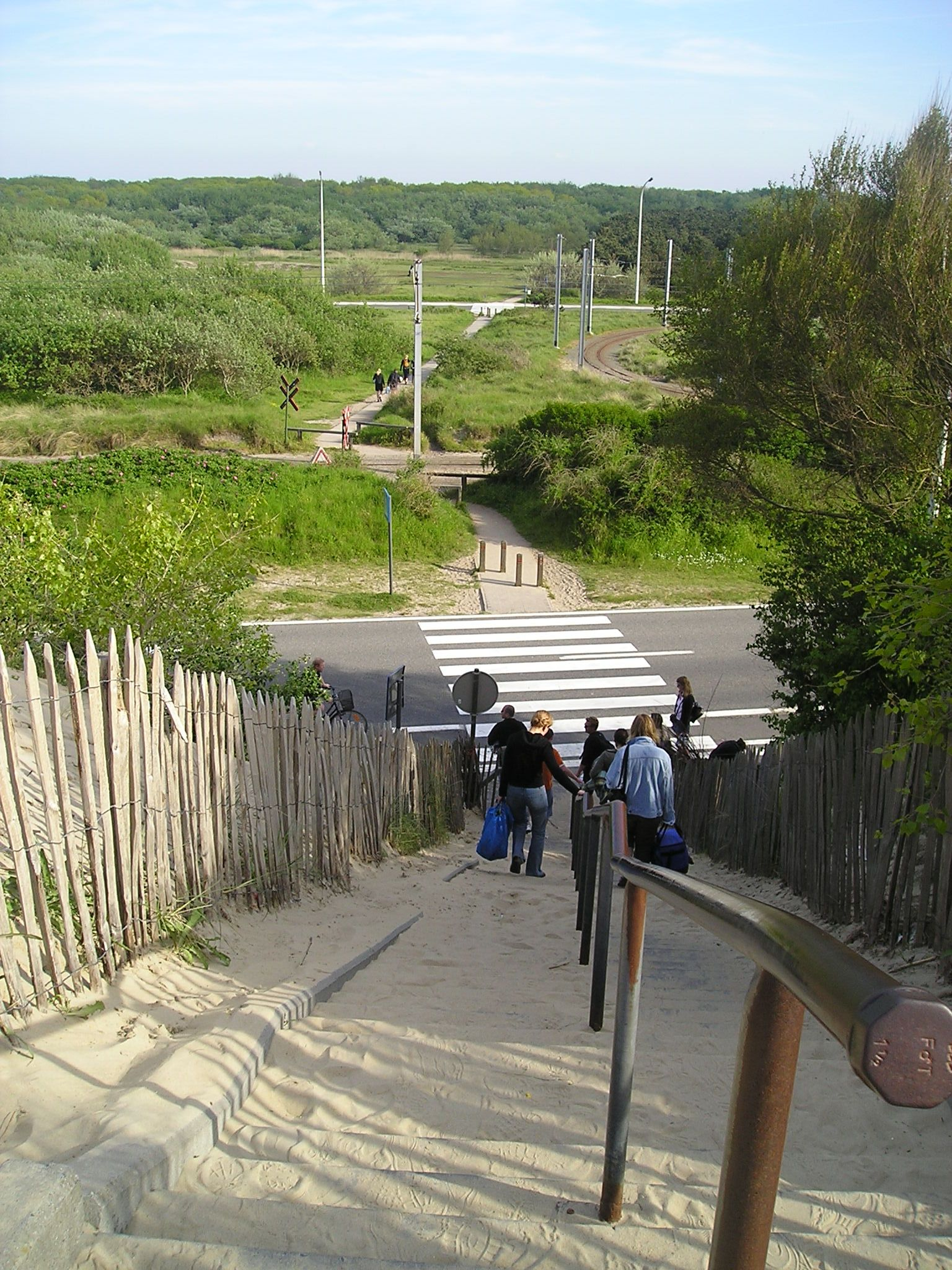
Dunes between De Haan and Wenduine

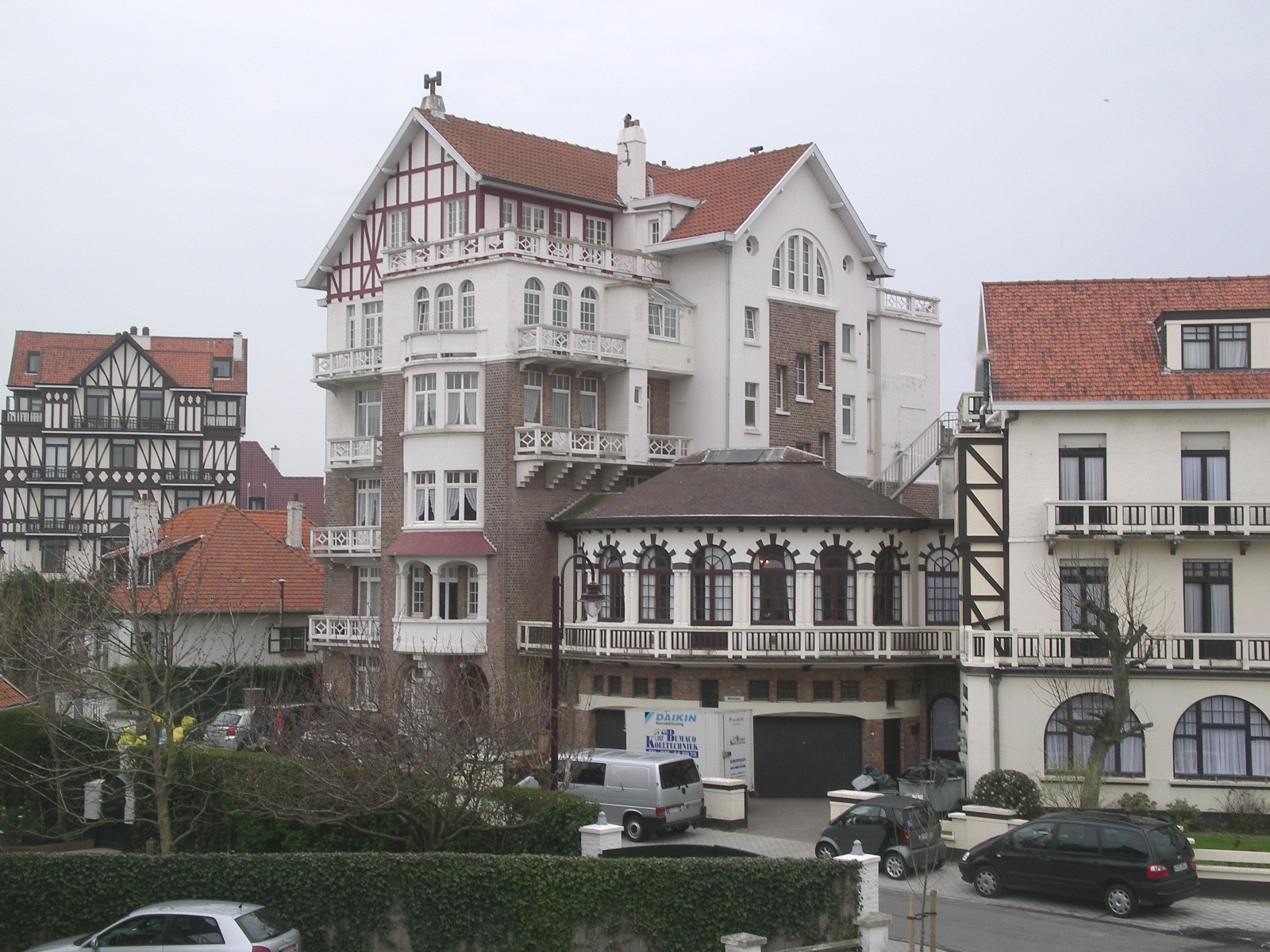
Street in the Concessie

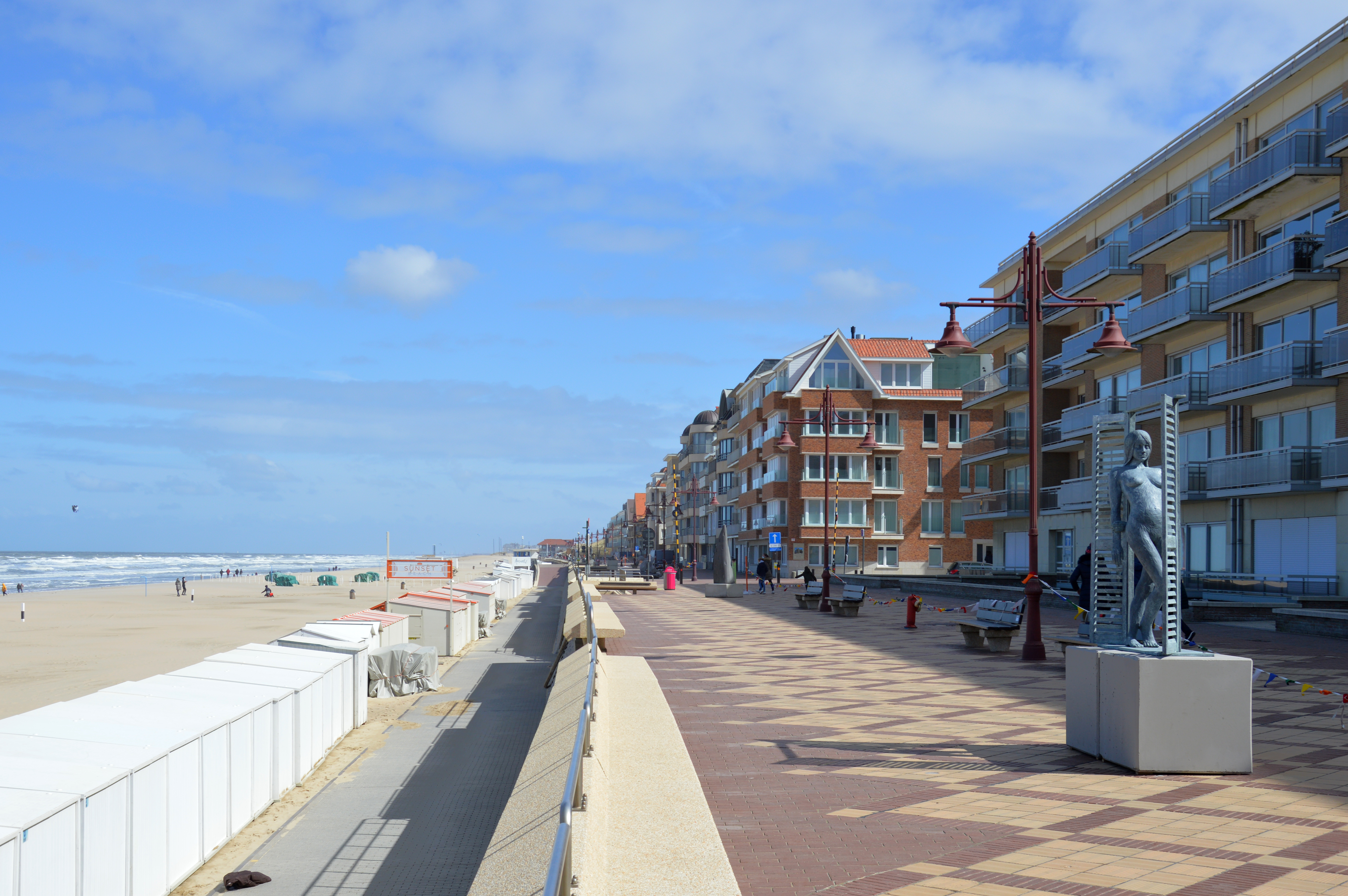
Beachfront

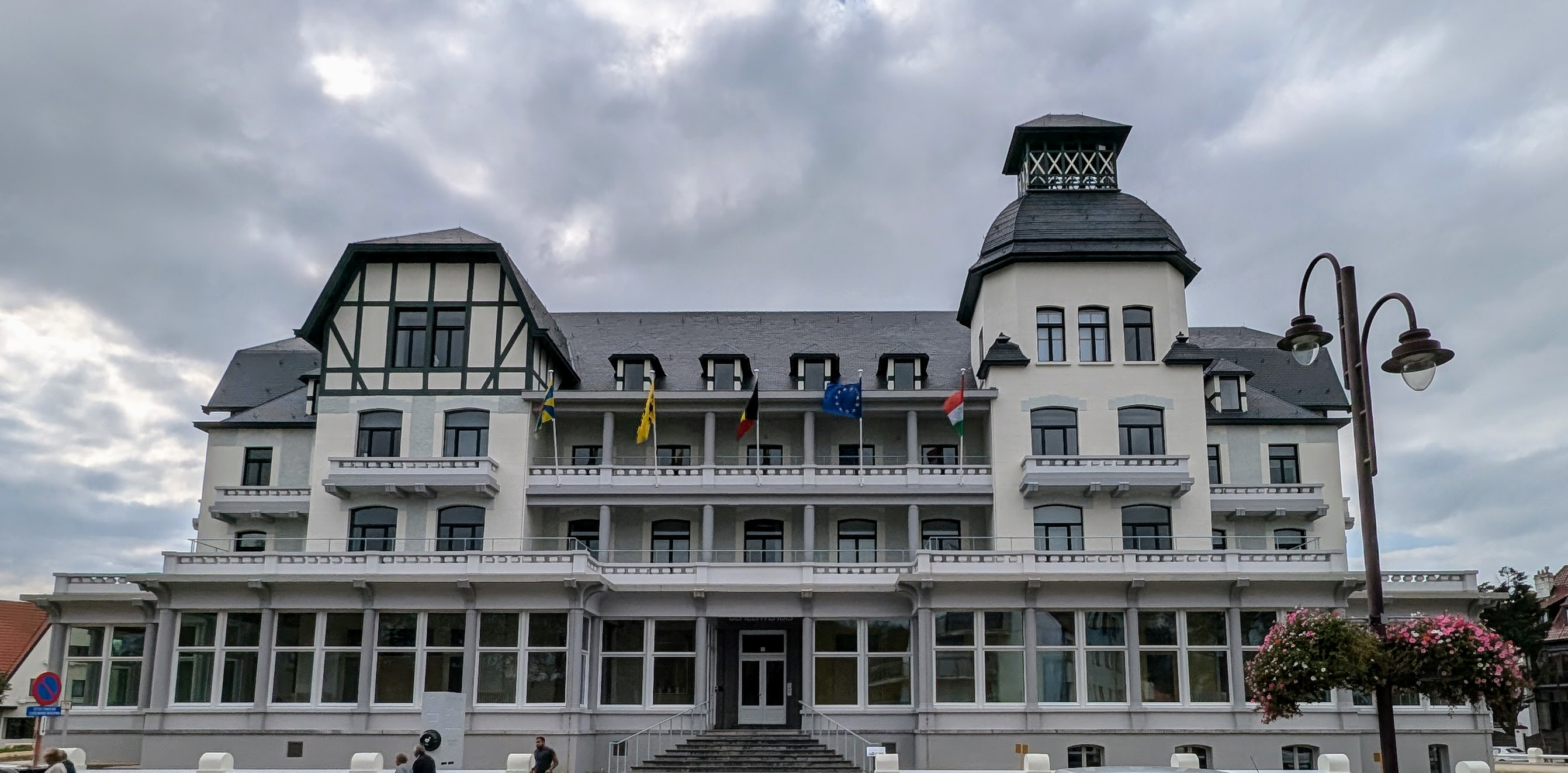
Municipal Hall of De Haan

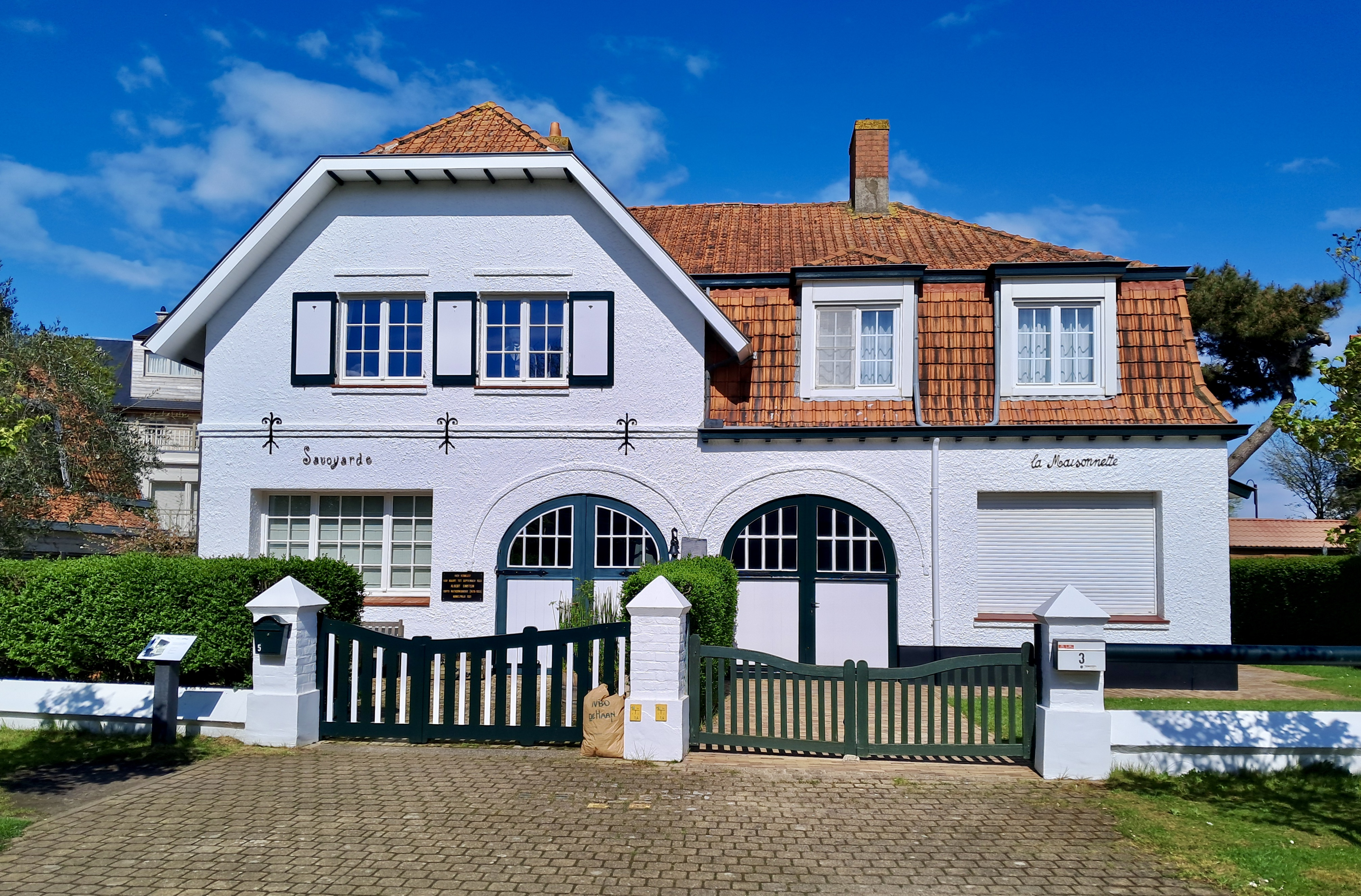
The Villa Savoyarde in De Haan, Belgium, residence of Albert Einstein for six months in 1933.

== Sports ==
Women's volleyball club Volley De Haan plays at the highest level of the Belgian league pyramid.

== Transport ==
All of the below are operated by De Lijn

=== Tram ===
De Haan has 10 stations on The Coast Tram.

=== Bus ===
The municipality is served by bus lines 31, 35 and 46.
