= Jef Geeraerts =

Belgian writer

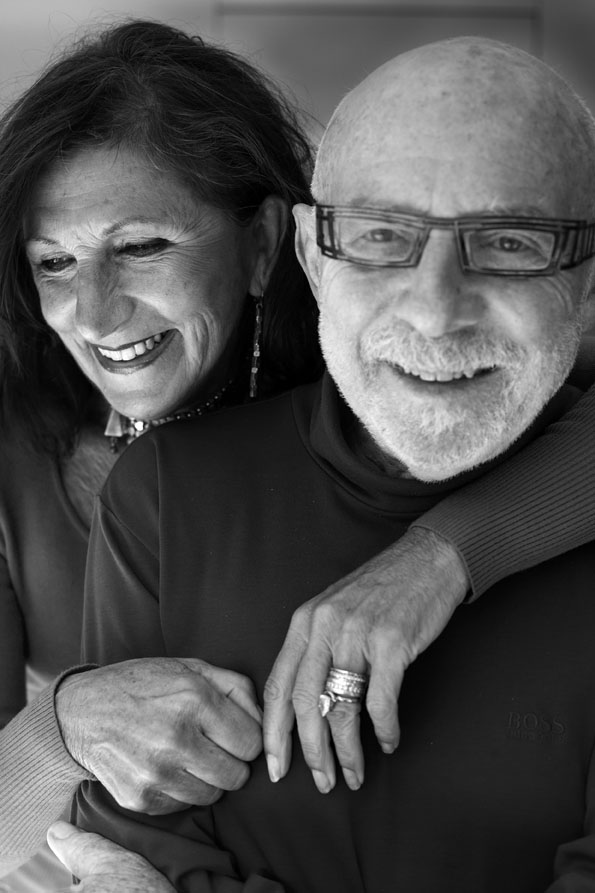
- Born: Jozef Adriaan Anna Geeraerts; 23 February 1930; Antwerp
- Died: 11 May 2015 (aged 85); Ghent
- Occupation: Writer
- Awards: Gouden Strop (De zaak Alzheimer, 1986)

Signature
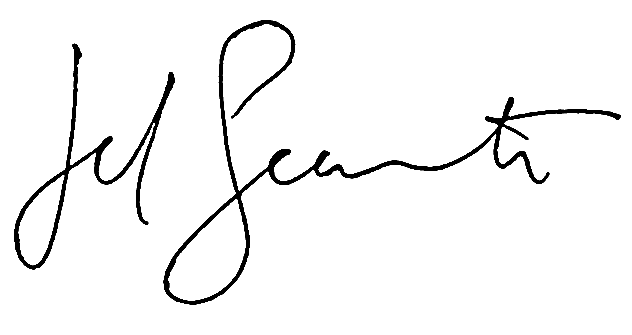

Jozef Adriaan Anna Geeraerts (23 February 1930 – 11 May 2015), better known as Jef Geeraerts, was a Belgian writer.

Geeraerts was born in Antwerp. After his studies in political and administrative sciences at the Colonial University of Belgium in Antwerp he became a colonial administrator in Belgian Congo. On the independence of the Congo he sent his wife and children back to Belgium and in August 1960 he himself returned to Belgium. During the next six years he was paid by the government (return program). After that time he needed to find a job to survive. He decided to become a writer and went to the University of Brussels to study Germanic languages.

== Career as a writer ==
When he had finished his studies he wrote his first novel, Ik ben maar een neger ("I'm just a negro"), which put him on the map as extremely controversial. The book was based on his experience as military in the Congo. He wrote more of these politically motivated colonial books before he started his Gangreen series. There are four parts, Gangreen 1 (Black Venus), Gangreen 2 (De Goede Moordenaar), Gangreen 3 (Het Teken van de Hond) and Gangreen 4 (Het Zevende Zegel). These books were sexually explicit, which led to controversy in Belgium. His books were considered by some to be racist and pornographic.

Geeraerts later became famous for his detective stories. Nowadays, he is a celebrated crime-novelist and several of his books (De zaak Alzheimer and Dossier K) have been filmed.

In total Geeraerts wrote 35 novels, some plays and a radio drama. Two of his books were used for a film.

== Private life ==
Geeraerts had three children from his first marriage, among these his daughter Ilse. In 1978, he married Eleonore Vigenon. In the last years of his life he lived in Baarle (Drongen), part of Ghent. He died from a heart attack in Ghent in May 2015.

== Awards and recognitions ==
- 1967 – Arkprijs van het Vrije Woord for De Troglodieten
- 1969 – Staatsprijs voor verhalend proza
- 1986 – de Gouden Strop for best Dutch crime novel

(incomplete list)

The town of Antwerp mounted a memory plate on the birth house of Geeraerts. In addition, the town bought his handwritten archive for conservation. The main-belt asteroid 13027 Geeraerts (1989 GJ4) discovered on 3 April 1989 by E. W. Elst at the European Southern Observatory was named after Jef Geeraerts.

== See also ==
- Meanings of asteroid names (13001-14000)
