= Erik Van Looy =

Belgian film director

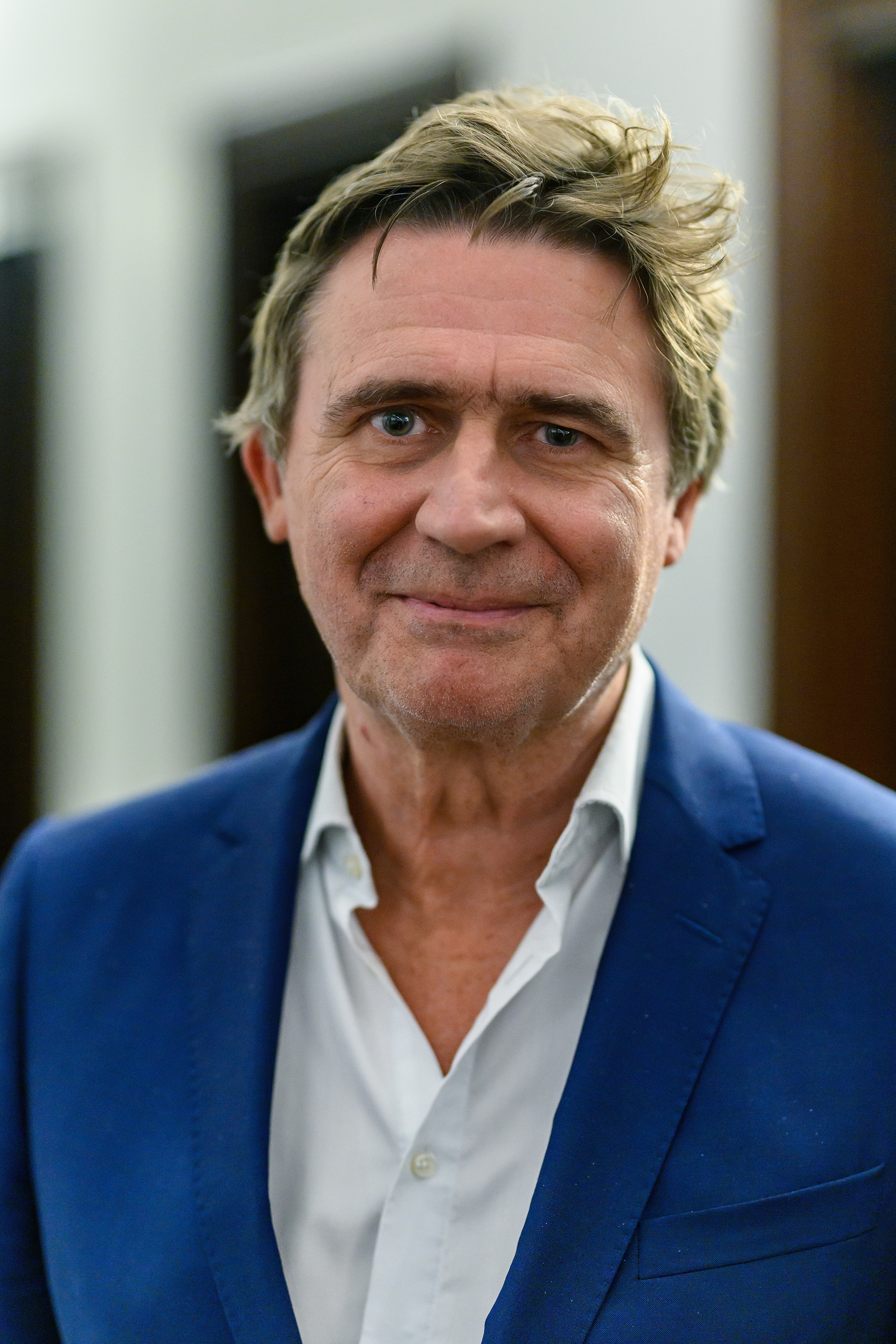
- Van Looy in 2023
- Born: 26 April 1962 (age 64)
- Occupations: Filmmaker & host on Play4 (TV channel)
- Known for: The Memory of a Killer; Loft; The Loft
- Children: Lucas Van Looy

Erik Ludovicus Maria Van Looy (Dutch: [ˈeːrɪk fɑn ˈloːi]; (Note: In isolation, van is pronounced [vɑn].) born 26 April 1962) is a Belgian film director known for his thriller movies.

Van Looy is also a popular television host in Flanders who hosts De Slimste Mens ter Wereld (The Smartest Person on Earth), and has hosted De Pappenheimers. The former is a television show aired on VIER where Van Looy and his team of comical judges are on a quest to find the world's smartest person, i.e., the one who has the best knowledge of politics, history, arts, sports, media and film.

== Awards and recognition ==
His most famous films The Alzheimer Case and Loft have been widely appreciated by Flemish audiences as well as Flemish critics, with Loft even selling the most admission tickets of any Flemish film in theaters to date. A remake Loft produced in the Netherlands was also a success. This resulted in an American remake, which was again highly praised by Flemish audiences and critics, but not by American critics.

== Films ==
Year	Title	Notes
1993	Ad Fundum	
1999	Shades	
2003	The Alzheimer Case	
2008	Loft	
2014	The Loft	
2016	The Prime Minister	
