= 15th René Awards =

2026 Belgian film and television awards ceremony

- Official poster
- Date: 7 March 2026
- Site: Flagey; Ixelles, Belgium
- Hosted by: Charline Vanhoenacker

Highlights
- Best Film: We Believe You
- Best Flemish Film: Julian
- Most awards: We Believe You (6)
- Most nominations: We Believe You (11)

Television coverage
- Network: RTBF; Proximus

The 15th René Awards ceremony, presented by the Académie André Delvaux, honored the best films of 2025 in Belgium. It took place on 7 March 2026 at the Flagey in Ixelles, beginning at 8:15 p.m. CET. It marked a transitional edition following the end of the partnership with the Magritte Foundation, which led to the adoption of the name "René Awards". It was hosted for the second time by comedian Charline Vanhoenacker and, for the first time in the award's history, was held without a president.

We Believe You won six awards, including Best Film and Best Director for Charlotte Devillers and Arnaud Dufeys. Other winners included Reflection in a Dead Diamond with four awards, Flow and Heads or Fails with two, Julian, Kika, Maldoror, Nino and Soundtrack to a Coup d'Etat with one. The ceremony was broadcast in Belgium on Auvio, Pickx, and Proximus Showcase, with a pre-show aired on La Une. Overall coverage reached seven million viewers.

== Winners and nominees ==
The nominations for the 15th René Awards were announced on 6 February 2026 and introduced, for the first time, competitive categories dedicated to television series. A total of 107 works were eligible, including 28 short films, 16 documentaries and 7 television series. Films with the most nominations were We Believe You with eleven, followed by Kika with eight, Young Mothers with seven, Adam's Interest and Maldoror with six. Jean-Pierre and Luc Dardenne received two nominations for Best Film as producers of Young Mothers and Adam's Interest.

The winners were announced during the awards ceremony on 7 March 2026. We Believe You became the fourth directorial debut to win Best Film, while Charlotte Devillers was the third woman to win Best Director. Anne Coesens was the first performer to win both film and television acting awards, having previously won Best Actress for Illégal and receiving the inaugural television acting award.

=== Film ===
Best Film: We Believe You – Charlotte Devillers, Arnaud Dufeys, and Arnaud Ponthière ‡; Adam's Interest – Laura Wandel, Stéphane Lhoest, Jean-Pierre and Luc Dardenne, and Delphine Thomson; Kika – Alexe Poukine and Benoît Roland; Maldoror – Fabrice Du Welz and Jean-Yves Roubin; Young Mothers – Jean-Pierre and Luc Dardenne, and Delphine Thomson	Best Director: Charlotte Devillers and Arnaud Dufeys – We Believe You ‡; Fabrice Du Welz – Maldoror; Alexe Poukine – Kika; Laura Wandel – Adam's Interest
Best Actor: Yannick Renier – Reflection in a Dead Diamond as John Diman ‡; Pierre Bastin – Vitrival – The Most Beautiful Village in the World as Petit Pierre; Jean-Benoît Ugeux – Krump as Frank; Arieh Worthalter – Ablaze as Jimmy Bouvier	Best Actress: Myriem Akheddiou – We Believe You as Alice Piron ‡; Lubna Azabal – Rabia as Madame; Bérangère McNeese – Tomorrow, if all Goes Well as Cindy; Mara Taquin – On the Edge as Alexia
Best Supporting Actor: Laurent Capelluto – We Believe You as M. Goossens ‡; François Bastin – Vitrival – The Most Beautiful Village in the World as François; Thomas Coumans – Kika as Paul; David Murgia – Maldoror as Didier Renard	Best Supporting Actress: Salomé Dewaels – Nino as Zoé ‡; Natali Broods – We Believe You as the judge; Christelle Cornil – Young Mothers as Nathalie; Babetida Sadjo – Muganga as Blanche; Anaël Snoek – Kika as Rasha
Best Screenplay: We Believe You – Charlotte Devillers and Arnaud Dufeys ‡; Adam's Interest – Laura Wandel; Kika – Alexe Poukine and Thomas Van Zuylen; Young Mothers – Jean-Pierre and Luc Dardenne	Best First Feature Film: Kika – Alexe Poukine and Benoît Roland ‡; The Virgin and Child – Berivan Binevsa, Isabel de la Serna, and Matthieu Frances; Vitrival – The Most Beautiful Village in the World – Noëlle Bastin, Baptiste Bogaert, Beata Saboova, and Vincent Metzinger; We Believe You – Charlotte Devillers, Arnaud Dufeys, and Arnaud Ponthière
Most Promising Actor: Maxi Delmelle – Heads or Fails as Giorgio ‡; Jules Delsart – Adam's Interest as Adam; Ulysse Goffin – We Believe You as Etienne; Jef Jacobs – Young Mothers as Dylan	Most Promising Actress: María Cavalier-Bazan – Heads or Fails as Armande Pigeon ‡; Janaïna Halloy Fokan – Young Mothers as Ariane; Elsa Houben – Young Mothers as Julie; Adèle Pinckaers – We Believe You as Lila Goossens
Best Flemish Film: Julian – Cato Kusters, Lukas Dhont, and Michiel Dhont ‡; BXL – Ish Ait Hamou, Monir Ait Hamou, and Peter De Maegd; Radioman – Frank Van Passel, Bert Hamelinck, and Helena Vlogaert; Soft Leaves – Miwako Van Weyenberg and Antonino Lombardo	Best Foreign Film: Flow (Latvia) – Gints Zilbalodis and Grégory Zalcman ‡; Alpha (France) – Julia Ducournau, Jean-Yves Roubin, and Cassandre Warnauts; Muganga (France) – Marie-Hélène Roux and Geneviève Lemal; Vermiglio (Italy) – Maura Delpero, Jacques-Henri Bronckart, and Tatjana Kozar
Best Cinematography: Reflection in a Dead Diamond – Manu Dacosse ‡; Adam's Interest – Frédéric Noirhomme; Kika – Colin Lévêque; We Believe You – Pépin Struye	Best Editing: We Believe You – Nicolas Bier ‡; Adam's Interest – Nicolas Rumpl; Young Mothers – Marie-Hélène Dozo
Best Original Score: Maldoror – Vincent Cahay ‡; Haunted Minds – Frédéric Vercheval; Radioman – Wim De Wilde	Best Sound: Flow – Philippe Charbonnel, Bertrand Boudaud, and Gurwal Coïc-Gallas ‡; Maldoror – Dirk Bombey, Julie Brenta, Emmanuel de Boissieu, and Bertrand Boudaud; Reflection in a Dead Diamond – Dan Bruylandt, Olivier Thys, Mathieu Cox, and Aline Gavroy
Best Production Design: Reflection in a Dead Diamond – Laurie Colson ‡; Maldoror – Emmanuel De Meulemeester; The Richest Woman in the World – Eve Martin	Best Costume Design: Reflection in a Dead Diamond – Jackye Fauconnier ‡; Heads or Fails – Justine Struye; Kika – Prunelle Rulens
Best Documentary Film: Soundtrack to a Coup d'Etat – Johan Grimonprez and Daan Milius ‡; Merckx – Christophe Hermans, Boris Tilquin, and Patrick Lauber; Little Rampart – Ève Duchemin and Annabella Nezri; Steel Running through Our Veins – Thierry Michel and Christine Pireaux	Best Documentary Short Film: Family Reunion – Jean Forest and Laurence Buelens ‡; In Our Hands – Zoé-Lise Steenbeke and Caroline Bruyr; For Cristianny Fernandes – Pauline Fonsny, Anaïs Carton, Maria José Freire, and Julie Freres; Lion's Wrinkle and Crow's Feet – Juliette Léonard, Manon Ledune, and Vincent Canart
Best Fiction Short Film: The Harvest – Alice D'Hauwe, Joseph Rouschop, and Eva Curia ‡; Blood-Red – Capucine Pinaud, Manon Ledune, and Vincent Canart; Home Sweet Home – Tiffany Deleuze and Bénédicte Lescalier; Samia – Selma Alaoui, Bruno Tracq, Benoît Roland, and Nabil Ben Yadir	Best Animated Short Film: Autokar – Sylwia Szkiladz, Jérémie Mazurek, and Christophe Beaujean ‡; The Bear's River – Anaïs Mauzat and Bastien Martin; Cimarron – Cédric Bourgeois, Rémi Vandenitte, Jérémie Mazurek, Christophe Beaujean, and William Henne; The Mud Under My Window – Violette Delvoye, Jérémie Mazurek, and Christophe Beaujean

=== Television ===
Best Television Series: Baraki – Julien Vargas, Peter Ninane, Fred De Loof, David Mathy, Benoît Roland, and Nabil Ben Yadir (Tipik) ‡; Attraction – Barbara Abel, Sophia Perié, Gilles de Voghel, Catherine Burniaux, and Christophe Toulemonde (La Une); Pandora – Savina Dellicour, Vania Leturcq, Bastien Santonja, Patrick Quinet, and Ives Swennen (La Une); Public Enemy – Antoine Bours, Frédéric Castadot, Gilles de Voghel, Matthieu Frances, Christopher Yates, and François Touwaide (La Une); Quiproquo – Etienne Bloc, Christophe Beaujean, Camille Didion, Simon Delecosse, and François Touwaide (La Une); Stilltown – Michèle Jacob, Benjamin Dessy, Diana Elbaum, and David Ragonig (La Une); Trentenaires – Camille Didion, Anthony Tueni, Diane Ntahimpera, and Ben Pays (Tipik)
Best Actor in a Television Series: Yoann Blanc – Pandora as Mark (La Une) ‡; Angelo Bison – Public Enemy as Béranger (La Une); Amine Hamidou – Quiproquo as Lykoz (La Une); Michelangelo Marchese – Stilltown as Ambrosio (La Une); Philippe Jeusette – Public Enemy as Patrick (La Une)	Best Actress in a Television Series: Anne Coesens – Pandora as Claire Delval (La Une) ‡; Myriem Akheddiou – Pandora as Krystel (La Une); Pauline Étienne – Public Enemy as Jessica (La Une); Laura Sépul – Attraction as Agathe (La Une)

=== Special awards ===
- People's Choice Award – We Believe You
- Spotlight Award – Myriem Akheddiou

== Films with multiple nominations and awards ==
The following films received multiple nominations.

- Eleven: We Believe You
- Eight: Kika
- Seven: Young Mothers
- Six: Adam's Interest, Maldoror
- Five: Reflection in a Dead Diamond
- Three: Heads or Fails, Vitrival – The Most Beautiful Village in the World
- Two: Flow, Muganga, Radioman

The following films received multiple awards.

- Six: We Believe You
- Four: Reflection in a Dead Diamond
- Two: Flow, Heads or Fails

== See also ==
- 2025 in film
- 51st César Awards
- 31st Lumière Awards
