= Magritte Award for Best Costume Design =

Belgian film award

- Presented by: Académie André Delvaux
- First award: 2011
- Currently held by: Jackye Fauconnier, Reflection in a Dead Diamond (2025)
- Website: lesmagritteducinema.com

The Magritte Award for Best Costume Design (French: Magritte des meilleurs costumes) is an award presented annually by the Académie André Delvaux. It is one of the Magritte Awards, which were established to recognize excellence in Belgian cinematic achievements.

The 1st Magritte Awards ceremony was held in 2011 with Christophe Pidre and Florence Scholtes receiving the award for their work in Sister Smile. As of the 2022 ceremony, Frédérick Denis is the most recent winner in this category for his work in Madly in Life.

== Winners and nominees ==
In the list below, winners are listed first in the colored row, followed by the other nominees.

=== 2010s ===
Year	English title	Original title	Costume designer(s)
2010 (1st)	Sister Smile	Soeur Sourire	Christophe Pidre and Florence Scholtes
2010 (1st)	Altiplano		Anne Fournier
2010 (1st)	My Queen Karo		Bernadette Corstens
2011 (2nd)	The Fairy	La Fée	Claire Dubien
2011 (2nd)	A Distant Neighborhood	Quartier lointain	Florence Scholtes
2011 (2nd)	The Giants	Les Géants	Elise Ancion
2012 (3rd)	Le grand soir		Florence Laforge
2012 (3rd)	The Minister	L'Exercice de l'État	Pascaline Chavanne
2012 (3rd)	Almayer's Folly	La Folie Almayer	Catherine Marchand
2013 (4th)	Vijay and I		Catherine Marchand
2013 (4th)	A Place on Earth	Une place sur la Terre	Elise Ancion
2013 (4th)	A Song for My Mother	Une chanson pour ma mère	Nathalie Deceuninck and Aliette Vliers
2014 (5th)	Marina		Catherine Marchand
2014 (5th)	The Strange Color of Your Body's Tears	L'Étrange Couleur des larmes de ton corps	Jackye Fauconnier
2014 (5th)	Tokyo Fiancée		Claire Dubien
2015 (6th)	The Lady in the Car with Glasses and a Gun	La Dame dans l'auto avec des lunettes et un fusil	Pascaline Chavanne
2015 (6th)	All Cats Are Grey	Tous les chats sont gris	Sabine Zappitelli
2015 (6th)	I'm Dead But I Have Friends	Je suis mort mais j'ai des amis	Elise Ancion
2016 (7th)	The First, the Last	Les Premiers, les Derniers	Elise Ancion
2016 (7th)	Baden Baden		Sandra Campisi
2016 (7th)	Black		Nina Caspari
2017 (8th)	A Wedding	Noces	Sophie Van Den Keybus
2017 (8th)	King of the Belgians		Claudine Tychon
2017 (8th)	Raw	Grave	Elise Ancion
2018 (9th)	Bye Bye Germany	Es war einmal in Deutschland...	Nathalie Leborgne
2018 (9th)	Girl		Catherine van Bree
2018 (9th)	Let the Corpses Tan	Laissez bronzer les cadavres	Jackye Fauconnier
2019 (10th)	Alone at My Wedding	Seule à mon mariage	Claudine Tychon
2019 (10th)	Emma Peeters		Gaëlle Fierens
2019 (10th)	Patrick	De Patrick	Valérie Le Roy

=== 2020s ===
Year	English title	Original title	Costume designer(s)
2020/21 (11th)	Madly in Life	Une vie démente	Frédérick Denis
2020/21 (11th)	Our Men	Mon légionnaire	Catherine Cosme
2020/21 (11th)	Working Girls	Filles de joie	Ann Lauwerys
2022 (12th)	Zero Fucks Given		Prunelle Rulens
2022 (12th)	Close		Manu Verschueren
2022 (12th)	Nobody Has to Know		Élise Ancion
2023 (13th)	Omen	Augure	Elke Hoste and Baloji
2023 (13th)	The Belgian Wave		Jessica Harkay
2023 (13th)	The Experience of Love	Le Syndrome des amours passées	Frédérick Denis
2023 (13th)	The Falling Star	L'Étoile filante	Claire Dubien
2024 (14th)	Night Call	La nuit se traîne	Isabel Van Renterghem
2024 (14th)	A Missing Part	Une part manquante	Julie Lebrun
2024 (14th)	Life's a Bitch	Chiennes de vie	Élise Abraham and Manon Golembieski
2025 (15th)	Reflection in a Dead Diamond	Reflet dans un diamant mort	Jackye Fauconnier
2025 (15th)	Heads or Fails	Aimer perdre	Justine Struye
2025 (15th)	Kika		Prunelle Rulens
