= 10th Magritte Awards =

2020 Belgian film awards ceremony

- Official poster
- Date: 1 February 2020
- Site: Square; Mont des Arts, Brussels, Belgium
- Hosted by: Kody

Highlights
- Best Film: Mothers' Instinct
- Most awards: Mothers' Instinct (9)
- Most nominations: Mothers' Instinct (10)

Television coverage
- Network: RTBF

The 10th Magritte Awards ceremony, presented by the Académie André Delvaux, honored the best films of 2019 in Belgium. It took place on 1 February 2020, at the Square, in the historic site of Mont des Arts, Brussels. During the ceremony, the Académie André Delvaux presented Magritte Awards in 22 categories. The ceremony was televised in Belgium by La Deux. Actor Pascal Duquenne presided the ceremony, while comedian Kody hosted the show for the first time.

The nominees for the 10th Magritte Awards were announced on 8 January 2020. Films with the most nominations were Mothers' Instinct with ten, followed by Young Ahmed with nine and Lola with seven. The winners were announced during the awards ceremony on 1 February 2020. Mothers' Instinct won a record-breaking nine awards, including Best Film and Best Director for Olivier Masset-Depasse. Other multiple winners were Lola and Young Ahmed with two awards each.

== Winners and nominees ==
=== Best Film ===
- Mothers' Instinct (Duelles)
  - Alone at My Wedding (Seule à mon mariage)
  - Lola (Lola vers la mer)
  - Our Mothers (Nuestras madres)
  - Young Ahmed (Le Jeune Ahmed)

=== Best Director ===
- Olivier Masset-Depasse – Mothers' Instinct (Duelles)
  - Jean-Pierre and Luc Dardenne – Young Ahmed (Le Jeune Ahmed)
  - César Díaz – Our Mothers (Nuestras madres)
  - Laurent Micheli – Lola (Lola vers la mer)

=== Best Actor ===
- Bouli Lanners – Real Love (C'est ça l'amour)
  - Kevin Janssens – Patrick (De Patrick)
  - Benoît Poelvoorde – Sink or Swim (Le Grand Bain)
  - Marc Zinga – The Mercy of the Jungle (La Miséricorde de la Jungle)

=== Best Actress ===
- Veerle Baetens – Mothers' Instinct (Duelles)
  - Lubna Azabal – Tel Aviv on Fire
  - Anne Coesens – Mothers' Instinct (Duelles)
  - Cécile de France – A Bigger World (Un monde plus grand)

=== Best Supporting Actor ===
- Arieh Worthalter – Mothers' Instinct (Duelles)
  - Othmane Moumen – Young Ahmed (Le Jeune Ahmed)
  - Bouli Lanners – Patrick (De Patrick)
  - Jonathan Zaccaï – Sink or Swim (Le Grand Bain)

=== Best Supporting Actress ===
- Myriem Akheddiou – Young Ahmed (Le Jeune Ahmed)
  - Claire Bodson – Young Ahmed (Le Jeune Ahmed)
  - Stéphanie Crayencour – Emma Peeters
  - Yolande Moreau – Cleo

=== Most Promising Actor ===
- Idir Ben Addi – Young Ahmed (Le Jeune Ahmed)
  - Baloji – Binti
  - François Neycken – Escapada
  - Jeremy Senez – Three Days and a Life (Trois jours et une vie)

=== Most Promising Actress ===
- Mya Bollaers – Lola (Lola vers la mer)
  - Bebel Tshiani Baloji – Binti
  - Victoria Bluck – Young Ahmed (Le Jeune Ahmed)
  - Raphaëlle Corbisier – Escapada

=== Best Screenplay ===
- Mothers' Instinct (Duelles) – Olivier Masset-Depasse
  - Lola (Lola vers la mer) – Laurent Micheli
  - Our Mothers (Nuestras madres) – César Díaz
  - Young Ahmed (Le Jeune Ahmed) – Jean-Pierre and Luc Dardenne

=== Best First Feature Film ===
- Our Mothers (Nuestras madres)
  - Alone at My Wedding (Seule à mon mariage)
  - Escapada
  - For a Happy Life (Pour vivre heureux)
  - Girls on the Run (Cavale)

=== Best Flemish Film ===
- Patrick (De Patrick)
  - Bastaard
  - Binti
  - Cleo

=== Best Foreign Film in Coproduction ===
- Sorry We Missed You
  - Atlantics (Atlantique)
  - The Sisters Brothers
  - Tel Aviv on Fire

=== Best Cinematography ===
- Mothers' Instinct (Duelles) – Hichame Alaouié
  - Our Mothers (Nuestras madres) – Virginie Surdej
  - The Sisters Brothers – Benoît Debie

=== Best Production Design ===
- Lola (Lola vers la mer) – Catherine Cosme
  - Patrick (De Patrick) – Hubert Pouille and Pepijn Van Looy
  - The Room – Françoise Joset

=== Best Costume Design ===
- Alone at My Wedding (Seule à mon mariage) – Claudine Tychon
  - Emma Peeters – Gaëlle Fierens
  - Patrick (De Patrick) – Valérie Le Roy

=== Best Original Score ===
- Mothers' Instinct (Duelles) – Frédéric Vercheval
  - Binti – Fabien Leclercq
  - Girls on the Run (Cavale) – Dan Klein
  - Lola (Lola vers la mer) – Raf Keunen

=== Best Sound ===
- Mothers' Instinct (Duelles) – Olivier Struye, Marc Bastien, Héléna Réveillère, Thomas Gauder
  - Atlantics (Atlantique) – Benoît De Clerck, Emmanuel de Boissieu, Claude Gillet
  - Our Mothers (Nuestras madres) – Emmanuel de Boissieu and Vincent Nouaille

=== Best Editing ===
- Mothers' Instinct (Duelles) – Damien Keyeux
  - Lola (Lola vers la mer) – Julie Naas
  - Young Ahmed (Le Jeune Ahmed) – Marie-Hélène Dozo

=== Best Fiction Short Film ===
- Matriochkas – Bérangère McNeese
  - Bruxelles–Beyrouth – Thibaut Wohlfahrt and Samir Youssef
  - Detours – Christopher Yates
  - Lucia en el limbo – Valentina Maurel

=== Best Animated Short Film ===
- The County Fair (La Foire agricole) – Vincent Patar and Stéphane Aubier
  - Big Wolf & Little Wolf (Grand Loup & Petit Loup) – Rémi Durin
  - Sweet Night (Nuit chérie) – Marine Jacob
  - Under the Rib Cage (Sous le cartilage des côtes) – Bruno Tondeur

=== Best Documentary Film ===
- My Name Is Clitoris (Mon nom est Clitoris) – Daphné Leblond and Lisa Billuart Monet
  - Bains Publics – Kita Bauchet
  - By the Name of Tania – Mary Jiménez and Bénédicte Liénard
  - That Which Does Not Kill (Sans frapper) – Alexe Poukine

=== Honorary Magritte Award ===
- Monica Bellucci

== Films with multiple nominations and awards ==
The following fifteen films received multiple nominations.

- 10: Mothers' Instinct
- 9: Young Ahmed
- 7: Lola
- 6: Our Mothers
- 5: Patrick
- 4: Binti
- 3: Alone at My Wedding, Escapada
- 2: Atlantics, Cleo, Emma Peeters, Girls on the Run, Sink or Swim, The Sisters Brothers, Tel Aviv on Fire

The following three films received multiple awards.

- 9: Mothers' Instinct
- 2: Lola, Young Ahmed

== See also ==
- 2019 in film
- 45th César Awards
- 25th Lumières Awards
