= List of awards and nominations received by Lukas Dhont =

Lukas Dhont awards and nominations
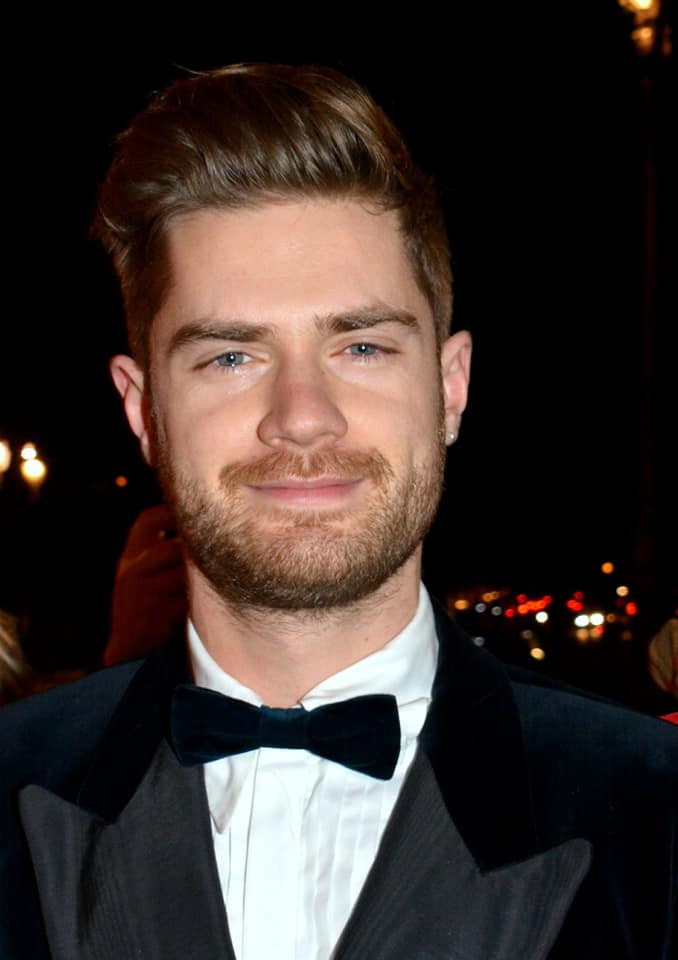
- Dhont in 2020
Awards and nominations
| Award | Wins | Nominations |
| Academy Award | 0 | 1 |
| Cannes Film Festival | 4 | 7 |
| Magritte Award | 5 | 5 |

Totals (Note: Certain award groups do not simply award one winner. They acknowledge several different recipients, have runners-up, and have third place. Since this is a specific recognition and is different from losing an award, runner-up mentions are considered wins in this award tally. For simplification and to avoid errors, each award in this list has been presumed to have had a prior nomination.)
- Wins: 47
- Nominations: 58

The following is a list of awards and nominations received by Belgian filmmaker Lukas Dhont.

== Major associations ==
=== Academy Awards ===
| Year | Category | Nominated work | Result | Ref. |
|---|---|---|---|---|
| 2023 | Best International Feature Film (as Belgium’s entry) | Close | Nominated | |

=== Cannes Film Festival ===
| Year | Category | Nominated work | Result | Ref. |
|---|---|---|---|---|
| 2018 | Prix Un Certain Regard | Girl | Nominated | |
| 2018 | Caméra d'Or | Girl | Won | |
| 2018 | Queer Palm | Girl | Won | |
| 2018 | FIPRESCI Prize – Un Certain Regard | Girl | Won | |
| 2022 | Palme d'Or | Close | Nominated | |
| 2022 | Grand Prix | Close | Won | |
| 2022 | Queer Palm | Close | Nominated | |
| 2026 | Palme d'Or | Coward | Nominated | |
| 2026 | Queer Palm | Coward | Nominated | |

=== César Awards ===
| Year | Category | Nominated work | Result | Ref. |
|---|---|---|---|---|
| 2019 | Best Foreign Film | Girl | Nominated | |
| 2023 | Best Foreign Film | Close | Nominated | |

=== Critics' Choice Awards ===
| Year | Category | Nominated work | Result | Ref. |
|---|---|---|---|---|
| 2023 | Best Foreign Language Film | Close | Nominated | |

=== European Film Awards ===
| Year | Category | Nominated work | Result | Ref. |
|---|---|---|---|---|
| 2018 | European Film | Girl | Nominated | |
| 2018 | European Discovery – Prix FIPRESCI | Girl | Won | |
| 2019 | People's Choice Award | Girl | Nominated | |
| 2022 | European Film | Close | Nominated | |
| 2022 | European Director | Close | Nominated | |
| 2022 | European Screenwriter | Close | Nominated | |
| 2022 | European University Film Award | Close | Nominated | |
| 2022 | LUX European Audience Film Award | Close | Won | |

=== Golden Globe Awards ===
| Year | Category | Nominated work | Result | Ref. |
|---|---|---|---|---|
| 2019 | Best Non-English Language Film | Girl | Nominated | |
| 2023 | Best Non-English Language Film | Close | Nominated | |

=== Magritte Awards ===
| Year | Category | Nominated work | Result | Ref. |
|---|---|---|---|---|
| 2019 | Best Flemish Film | Girl | Won | |
| 2019 | Best Screenplay | Girl | Won | |
| 2023 | Best Flemish Film | Close | Won | |
| 2023 | Best Screenplay | Close | Won | |
| 2026 | Best Flemish Film | Julian | Won | |

== Industry awards ==
| Organization | Year | Category | Work | Result | Ref. |
|---|---|---|---|---|---|
| Amanda Awards | 2023 | Best Foreign Language Film | Close | Won | |
| Bodil Awards | 2024 | Best Non-English Language Film | Close | Won | |
| British Independent Film Awards | 2022 | Best International Independent Film | Close | Nominated | |
| Ensor Awards | 2015 | Best Short Film | L'Infini | Won | |
| Ensor Awards | 2018 | Best National Debut | Girl | Won | |
| Ensor Awards | 2019 | Best Film | Girl | Won | |
| Ensor Awards | 2019 | Best Director | Girl | Won | |
| Ensor Awards | 2019 | Best Screenplay | Girl | Won | |
| Ensor Awards | 2023 | Best Film | Close | Won | |
| Ensor Awards | 2023 | Best Director | Close | Won | |
| Ensor Awards | 2023 | Best Screenplay | Close | Won | |
| Gaudí Awards | 2024 | Best European Film | Close | Nominated | |
| Gopo Awards | 2024 | Best European Film | Close | Nominated | |
| Goya Awards | 2019 | Best European Film | Girl | Nominated | |
| Lumière Awards | 2019 | Best Francophone Film | Girl | Won | |
| Polish Film Awards | 2024 | Best European Film | Close | Nominated | |
| Robert Awards | 2024 | Best Non-English Language Film | Close | Won | |
| Satellite Awards | 2022 | Best Motion Picture – International | Close | Nominated | |
| Satellite Awards | 2022 | Best Original Screenplay | Close | Nominated | |

== Critics awards ==
| Organization | Year | Category | Work | Result | Ref. |
|---|---|---|---|---|---|
| Austin Film Critics Association | 2022 | Best International Film | Close | Nominated | |
| Belgian Film Critics Association | 2018 | André Cavens Award | Girl | Won | |
| Belgian Film Critics Association | 2022 | André Cavens Award | Close | Won | |
| Belgian Film Critics Association | 2022 | Grand Prix | Close | Nominated | |
| Chicago Film Critics Association | 2022 | Best Foreign Language Film | Close | Nominated | |
| Dallas–Fort Worth Film Critics Association | 2022 | Best Foreign Language Film | Close | Runner-up | |
| Dorian Awards | 2023 | Non-English Language Film of the Year | Close | Nominated | |
| Dorian Awards | 2023 | Unsung LGBTQ Film Film of the Year | Close | Won | |
| Dublin Film Critics' Circle | 2023 | Best Film | Close | Nominated | |
| Dublin Film Critics' Circle | 2023 | Best Director | Close | Nominated | |
| French Syndicate of Cinema Critics | 2019 | Best Foreign Debut Film | Girl | Won | |
| Georgia Film Critics Association | 2022 | Best International Film | Close | Nominated | |
| Hollywood Critics Association | 2023 | Best International Film | Close | Nominated | |
| Houston Film Critics Society | 2022 | Best Foreign Language Feature | Close | Nominated | |
| National Board of Review | 2022 | Best Foreign Language Film | Close | Won | |
| San Diego Film Critics Society | 2022 | Best Foreign Language Film | Close | Nominated | |
| San Francisco Bay Area Film Critics Circle | 2022 | Best International Feature Film | Close | Nominated | |
| St. Louis Film Critics Association | 2022 | Best International Film | Close | Nominated | |
| Washington D.C. Area Film Critics Association | 2022 | Best International/Foreign Language Film | Close | Nominated | |

== Festival awards ==
| Festival | Year | Category | Work | Result | Ref. |
|---|---|---|---|---|---|
| BFI London Film Festival | 2018 | Sutherland Trophy | Girl | Won | |
| Chicago International Film Festival | 2022 | Silver Hugo Jury Award | Close | Won | |
| Chicago International Film Festival | 2022 | Gold Q-Hugo | Close | Won | |
| CineFest Miskolc International Film Festival | 2022 | CICAE Jury Prize | Close | Won | |
| Cinemania | 2022 | Prix du Jury | Close | Won | |
| Cinemania | 2022 | Prix du Public Mel Hoppenheim | Close | Won | |
| Norwegian International Film Festival | 2022 | Norwegian Film Critics’ Award | Close | Won | |
| Festival international du cinéma francophone en Acadie | 2022 | Best International Feature Film | Close | Won | |
| Film Fest Ghent | 2012 | Special Mention | Headlong | Won | |
| Film Fest Ghent | 2014 | Best Belgian Student Short Film | L'Infini | Won | |
| Filmfest Hamburg | 2022 | Arthouse Cinema Award | Close | Won | |
| Haifa International Film Festival | 2022 | Carmel Award for Best Film – International Competition | Close | Won | |
| Hamptons International Film Festival | 2022 | Best Narrative Feature | Close | Won | |
| Heartland International Film Festival | 2022 | Special Presentation Narrative Audience Choice Award | Close | Won | |
| Les Arcs Film Festival | 2017 | TitraFilm Award | Girl | Won | |
| Ljubljana International Film Festival | 2022 | Kinotrip Young Jury Award | Close | Won | |
| Ljubljana International Film Festival | 2022 | Slovenian Art Cinema Association Award | Close | Won | |
| Mill Valley Film Festival | 2022 | Audience Favorite – World Cinema (Foreign Language) | Close | Won | |
| Morelia International Film Festival | 2022 | Audience Award for International Feature Film | Close | Won | |
| Palić European Film Festival | 2018 | Golden Tower for Best Film | Girl | Won | |
| Palić European Film Festival | 2022 | Gorki List Audience Award | Close | Won | |
| San Sebastián International Film Festival | 2018 | Sebastiane Award | Girl | Won | |
| San Sebastián International Film Festival | 2018 | San Sebastian Audience Award for Best European Film | Girl | Won | |
| Santa Fe International Film Festival | 2022 | Audience Choice Best Narrative Feature | Close | Won | |
| Seville European Film Festival | 2022 | Grand Jury Prize | Close | Won | |
| Sydney Film Festival | 2022 | Sydney Film Prize | Close | Won | |
| Zurich Film Festival | 2018 | Golden Eye | Girl | Won | |
