= Mexico 86 =

Mexico 86 may refer to:

- 1986 FIFA World Cup, an international association football tournament held in Mexico
- Mexico 86 (film), a 2024 drama film directed by César Díaz
- 1986 in Mexico
