= Mya Bollaers =

Belgian actress

- Born: 1996 (age 29–30); Liège, Belgium
- Occupation: Actress
- Years active: 2018–present

Mya Bollaers (French: [mi.a bɔlaʁs]) is a Belgian actress.

== Career ==
She rose to prominence with her title role in the 2019 film Lola (Lola vers la mer), in which she played an 18-year-old transgender girl grieving the death of her mother. Her portrayal received general acclaim from film critics, resulting in numerous accolades. At the 10th Magritte Awards, Lola received seven nominations and won two, including Most Promising Actress for Bollaers, becoming the first openly transgender person to be nominated for a Magritte Award.

At the 45th César Awards, Bollaers was selected to compete for the César Award for Most Promising Actress.

== Filmography ==
Year	Title	Role	Notes
2019	Lola	Lola	César Award – Révélations; Magritte Award for Most Promising Actress; Golden Ibis Award for Best Actress
2025	Colours of Time	The brothel's housekeeper	
