= Lola (2019 film) =

2019 drama film

- Film poster
- Directed by: Laurent Micheli
- Written by: Laurent Micheli
- Produced by: Sébastien Haguenauer; Benoit Roland
- Starring: Benoît Magimel; Mya Bollaers
- Cinematography: Olivier Boonjing
- Edited by: Julie Naas
- Music by: Raf Keunen
- Distributed by: Cinemien
- Release dates: 21 September 2019 (Angoulême); 11 December 2019
- Running time: 90 minutes
- Countries: Belgium; France
- Languages: French; Flemish

Lola (French: Lola vers la mer, also known as Lola and the Sea) is a 2019 Belgian-French drama film written and directed by Laurent Micheli. It stars Mya Bollaers, in her acting debut, as an 18-year-old transgender girl grieving the death of her mother. The film had its world premiere at the 2019 Angoulême Francophone Film Festival.

At the 10th Magritte Awards, Lola received seven nominations, including Best Film and Best Director for Laurent Micheli, winning Most Promising Actress for Mya Bollaers and Best Production Design for Catherine Cosme. Bollaers became the first openly transgender person to be nominated for the award.

== Plot ==
Lola, a young transgender woman who has been living apart from her family for two years, is preparing for gender-affirming surgery while sharing an apartment in Brussels with her friend Antoine. The sudden death of her mother compels her to reconnect with her estranged father, Philippe, with whom she has had a strained relationship. Together, they embark on a journey to fulfill the late mother's final wishes, traveling to the Belgian coast to scatter her ashes.

== Cast ==
- Mya Bollaers as Lola
- Benoît Magimel as Philippe
- Sami Outalbali as Samir
- Jérémy Zagba as Antoine
- Els Deceukelier as the club's owner

== Critical reception ==
On review aggregator website AlloCiné, the film has a weighted average score of 72 out of 100, based on 20 critics.

== Accolades ==
Award / Film Festival	Category	Recipients and nominees	Result
Angoulême Francophone Film Festival	Best Film		Nominated
César Award	Best Foreign Film		Nominated
Golden Ibis Award	Best Film		Nominated
Golden Ibis Award	Best Screenplay	Laurent Micheli	Won
Golden Ibis Award	Best Actor	Benoît Magimel	Won
Golden Ibis Award	Best Actress	Mya Bollaers	Won
Golden Ibis Award	Best Original Score	Raf Keunen	Nominated
Lumière Awards	Best International Co-Production		Nominated
Magritte Award	Best Film		Nominated
Magritte Award	Best Director	Laurent Micheli	Nominated
Magritte Award	Best Screenplay	Laurent Micheli	Nominated
Magritte Award	Most Promising Actress	Mya Bollaers	Won
Magritte Award	Best Production Design	Catherine Cosme	Won
Magritte Award	Best Original Score	Raf Keunen	Nominated
Magritte Award	Best Editing	Julie Naas	Nominated
Namur Film Festival	Cinevox Award		Won
