= Cleo (2019 Belgian film) =

- Film poster
- Directed by: Eva Cools
- Written by: Eva Cools
- Produced by: Annemie Degryse, Jan De Clercq
- Starring: Anna Franziska Jaeger; Roy Aernouts; Yolande Moreau
- Cinematography: Brecht Goyvaerts
- Edited by: Alain Dessauvage
- Music by: Mauro Pawlowski
- Production company: Lunanime
- Distributed by: Lumière
- Release dates: 17 October 2019 (Gent International Film Festival); 27 November 2019
- Running time: 100'
- Country: Belgium
- Languages: Dutch, French

Cleo is a 2019 Belgian drama film directed and written by Eva Cools, her first feature-length film.

== Background ==
Cools funded the film with support from the Flemish Audiovisual Fund, Screen Brussels and via additional support from crowdsourcing.

== Plot ==
Cleo is the story of a 17-year-old girl who survives a serious road accident. Her parents did not have that chance. After this fatal night, she gets lost in Brussels and takes refuge with Leos, a mysterious man older than her. Cleo's father was a renowned pianist, and the girl has been playing since a very young age. If Cleo likes to listen to contemporary music, it is the piano (and especially the work of Rachmaninov) that is at the heart of her reconstruction process.

== Cast ==
- Anna Franziska Jaeger as Cleo
- Roy Aernouts as Leos
- Natali Broods as Arianne
- Yolande Moreau as Jet
- Martha Canga Antonio as Myra
- Jan Hammenecker as De Wachter
- Lucie Debay as Jeanne
- Ishaq El Akel as Bruno
- Jeff Aendenboom as Bram
- Tom Audenaert as Buschauffeur
- David Murgia as Alex
- Femke Heijens as Swimming Teacher
- Hafid Stitou as SUV-driver

== Production ==
Principal photography on the film began on 24 January 2018 and lasted til 9 March 2018 in Belgium.

== Accolades ==
Cools won the Visser-Neerlandia Prize in 2016 for the film's script. Cools' debut film Cleo won the Alice MyMovies Award at the Italian Alice Nella Città film festival.

At the 10th Magritte Awards, Cleo received two nominations in the categories of Best Flemish Film and Best Supporting Actress for Yolande Moreau.
