= Housekeeping for Beginners =

2023 drama film

- Theatrical release poster
- Directed by: Goran Stolevski
- Written by: Goran Stolevski
- Produced by: Blerta Basholli; Marija Dimitrova; Beata Rzezniczek; Klaudia Śmieja-Rostworowska; Milan Stojanovic; Anikca Tilic
- Starring: Anamaria Marinca; Alina Serban; Samson Selim; Vladimir Tintor; Mia Mustafi; Dżada Selim
- Cinematography: Naum Doksevski
- Edited by: Goran Stolevski
- Music by: Alen Sinkauz; Nenad Sinkauz
- Production companies: List Production; Madants; Kinorama; Sense Productions; Industria Film; Film i Väst; Common Ground; Causeway Films; Tango Entertainment
- Distributed by: Focus Features (United States); Maslow Entertainment (Australia); Madants Distribution (Poland); Universal Pictures (International)
- Release dates: 6 September 2023 (Venice); 5 April 2024 (United States); 9 May 2024 (Australia)
- Running time: 107 minutes
- Countries: Poland; Serbia; Australia; Croatia; Kosovo; North Macedonia; United States
- Languages: Albanian; Macedonian; Romani
- Box office: $313,445

Housekeeping for Beginners (Macedonian: Домаќинство за почетници, romanized: Domaḱinstvo za početnici) is a 2023 drama film written, directed and edited by Goran Stolevski. It stars Anamaria Marinca, Alina Serban, Samson Selim, Vladimir Tintor, Mia Mustafi, and Dżada Selim. It is an international co-production between North Macedonia, Croatia, Serbia, Kosovo, Poland, Australia, and the United States.

The film premiered on 6 September 2023, at the 80th Venice International Film Festival, where it won the Queer Lion. It was selected as the Macedonian entry for the Best International Feature Film at the 96th Academy Awards. It was released in the United States on 5 April 2024, and later in Australia on 9 May 2024.

== Plot ==
Dita is forced to raise her girlfriend's two daughters even though she has never aspired to be a mother.

== Cast ==
- Anamaria Marinca as Dita
- Alina Serban as Suada
- Samson Selim as Ali
- Vladimir Tintor as Toni
- Mia Mustafi as Vanesa
- Dżada Selim as Mia
- Sara Klimoska as Elena
- Rozafa Celaj as Flora
- Ajse Useini as Teuta

== Production ==
In May 2022, it was announced Goran Stolevski would direct the film, with Marija Dimitrova serving as producer. Principal photography began by July 2022. In February 2023, it was announced Anamaria Marinca had joined the cast of the film.

== Release ==
It had its world premiere in the Orizzonti section at the 80th Venice International Film Festival on 6 September 2023. In August 2023, prior to the festival premiere, Focus Features acquired distribution rights to the film. It was also invited at the 28th Busan International Film Festival in 'World Cinema' section and was screened on 5 October 2023. It was released in the United States on 5 April 2024, after being previously scheduled to be released on 26 January 2024. It will be released in Australia on 9 May 2024, with Maslow Entertainment co-distributing the film with Focus Features and Universal Pictures.

== Reception ==
=== Accolades ===
Award	Date of ceremony	Category	Recipient(s)	Result	Ref.
Venice Film Festival	9 September 2023	Orizzonti Award for Best Feature Film	Goran Stolevski	Nominated	
Venice Film Festival	9 September 2023	Queer Lion	Goran Stolevski	Won	
Venice Film Festival	9 September 2023	Premio Fondazione Fai Persona Lavoro Ambiente – Special Mention	Goran Stolevski	Won	
Chicago International Film Festival	22 October 2023	Gold Q-Hugo	Housekeeping for Beginners	Nominated	
Chicago International Film Festival	22 October 2023	Silver Q-Hugo	Housekeeping for Beginners	Won	
European Film Awards	9 December 2023	University Film Award	Housekeeping for Beginners	Nominated	

== See also ==
- List of submissions to the 96th Academy Awards for Best International Feature Film
- List of Macedonian submissions for the Academy Award for Best International Feature Film
