= Rough Diamonds (2023 TV series) =

Belgian Dutch-language crime drama TV series on Netflix

- Genre: Drama
- Created by: Rotem Shamir, Yuval Yefet
- Starring: Kevin Janssens; Ini Massez; Robbie Cleiren; Els Dottermans
- Country of origin: Belgium
- Original languages: Dutch, Yiddish (also English, and French)
- No. of seasons: 1
- No. of episodes: 8

Production
- Running time: 50 minutes
- Production companies: De Mensen, Keshet International, VRT

Original release
- Network: Netflix
- Release: 21 April 2023 – present

Rough Diamonds is a Belgian drama television series set in the Orthodox Jewish diamond dealing community of Antwerp. The series premiered on Netflix on April 21, 2023.

== Synopsis ==
Noah Wolfson travels home to Antwerp after the suicide of his younger brother, Yanki. Upon his return, Noah reconnects with the Haredi community he abandoned when he left the Orthodox faith, while also trying to rescue his family's diamond trading business from the pressures of organized crime and a zealous local prosecutor.

== Cast and characters ==
- Kevin Janssens as Noah Wolfson
- Ini Massez as Adina Glazer
- Robbie Cleren as Eli Wolfson
- Yona Elian as Sarah Wolfson
- Marie Vinck as Gila Wolfson
- Els Dottermans as Jo Smets
- Dudu Fisher as Ezra Wolfson
- Tine Joustra as Kerra McCabe
- Casper Knopf as Tommy McCabe
- Soroush Helali as Bujar

== Production ==
Rough Diamonds is a co-production from Israel's Keshet International, Belgium's De Mensen, and Vlaamse Radio- en Televisieomroeporganisatie (VRT).

== Reception ==
The show has received generally positive reviews. Haaretz writes that the series is a "gem" that comes "from the heart."
