= Our Mothers =

2019 film

- Film poster
- Spanish: Nuestras Madres
- Directed by: César Díaz
- Written by: Cesar Diaz
- Produced by: Delphine Schmit; Géraldine Sprimont
- Starring: Armando Espitia; Emma Dib; Aurelia Caal; Julio Serrano Echeverría
- Cinematography: Virginie Surdej
- Edited by: Damien Maestraggi
- Music by: Rémi Boubal
- Production companies: Need Productions; Perspective Films; Cine Concepcion; Proximus
- Distributed by: Pyramide
- Release date: 21 May 2019 (Cannes)
- Running time: 78 minutes
- Countries: Belgium; France; Guatemala
- Language: Spanish

Our Mothers (Spanish: Nuestras madres) is a 2019 drama film written and directed by César Díaz. The film was an international co-production between companies in Belgium, France and Guatemala.

It follows a forensic anthropologist in Guatemala investigating the disappearance of his father, a guerrilla fighter who went missing in the 1980s. It was screened at the Critics Week section of the 2019 Cannes Film Festival where Díaz won the Caméra d'Or.

== Cast ==
- Armando Espitia as Ernesto
- Emma Dib as Cristina
- Aurelia Caal as Nicolasa
- Julio Serrano Echeverría as Juan

== Release ==
Our Mothers was selected as the Belgian entry for the Best International Feature Film at the 92nd Academy Awards, but it was not nominated. It received six nominations at the 10th Magritte Awards, including Best Film and Best Director for Díaz, winning Best First Feature Film.

== Accolades ==
Award / Film Festival	Category	Recipients and nominees	Result
Belgian Film Critics Association	Best Film		Won
Cannes Film Festival	Caméra d'Or		Won
Cannes Film Festival	Grand Prize – Critics' Week		Nominated
Cannes Film Festival	SACD Award		Won
Magritte Award	Best Film		Nominated
Magritte Award	Best Director	César Díaz	Nominated
Magritte Award	Best Screenplay	César Díaz	Nominated
Magritte Award	Best First Feature Film		Won
Magritte Award	Best Cinematography	Virginie Surdej	Nominated
Magritte Award	Best Sound	Emmanuel de Boissieu, Vincent Nouaille	Nominated

== See also ==
- List of submissions to the 92nd Academy Awards for Best International Feature Film
- List of Belgian submissions for the Academy Award for Best International Feature Film
