= Vladimir Tintor (actor) =

Serbian actor (born 1978)

- Владимир Тинтор
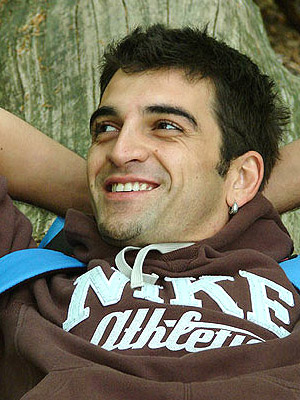
- Tintor in 2007
- Born: 18 July 1978 (age 48); Novi Sad, Socialist Republic of Serbia, SFR Yugoslavia
- Citizenship: Serbia; Croatia
- Education: University of Novi Sad
- Occupation: Actor
- Years active: 2002–present

Vladimir Tintor (Serbian Cyrillic: Владимир Тинтор; born 18 July 1978) is a Serbian film actor who lives and works in Croatia. He appeared in more than twelve films since 2002.

== Personal life ==
He came out as gay in 2008. He currently lives in Osijek.

== Selected filmography ==
Film
Year	Title	Role	Notes
2023	Housekeeping for Beginners	Toni	
2012	Sonja and the Bull	Davor	
2004	Žurka	Petar	

TV
Year	Title	Role	Notes
2022–present	Kumovi	Aljoša Gotovac	423 episodes
2018–2020	Novine	Goran Šamanović	10 episodes
2019	Pogrešan čovjek	David's friend	1 episode
2010	Mamutica	Darko Nižetić	2 episodes
2009	Sve će biti dobro	Banker	3 episodes
2009	Bračne vode	Mladen	1 episode
2009	Najbolje godine	Stefano	1 episode
2008	Zakon ljubavi	Andrej Žerjavić	19 episodes
2008	Ponos Ratkajevih	Mačko	3 episodes
2006–2008	Zabranjena ljubav	Franjo Barišić	375 episodes
