= Catacombe (film) =

2018 film

- Film poster
- Directed by: Victor D. Ponten
- Written by: Victor D. Ponten
- Starring: Willem de Bruin; Kevin Janssens
- Release date: 18 September 2018
- Country: Netherlands
- Language: Dutch

Catacombe is a 2018 Dutch drama film directed by Victor D. Ponten. In July 2018, it was one of nine films shortlisted to be the Dutch entry for the Best Foreign Language Film at the 91st Academy Awards, but it was not selected.

== Cast ==
- Willem de Bruin as Jermaine Slagter
- Kevin Janssens as Kevin van Looy
- Orion Lee as Charlie Yuen
- Werner Kolf as Samuel
- Liliana de Vries as Naomi
- Loes Schnepper as Coby
