= Kevin Janssens (actor) =

Belgian actor (born 1979)

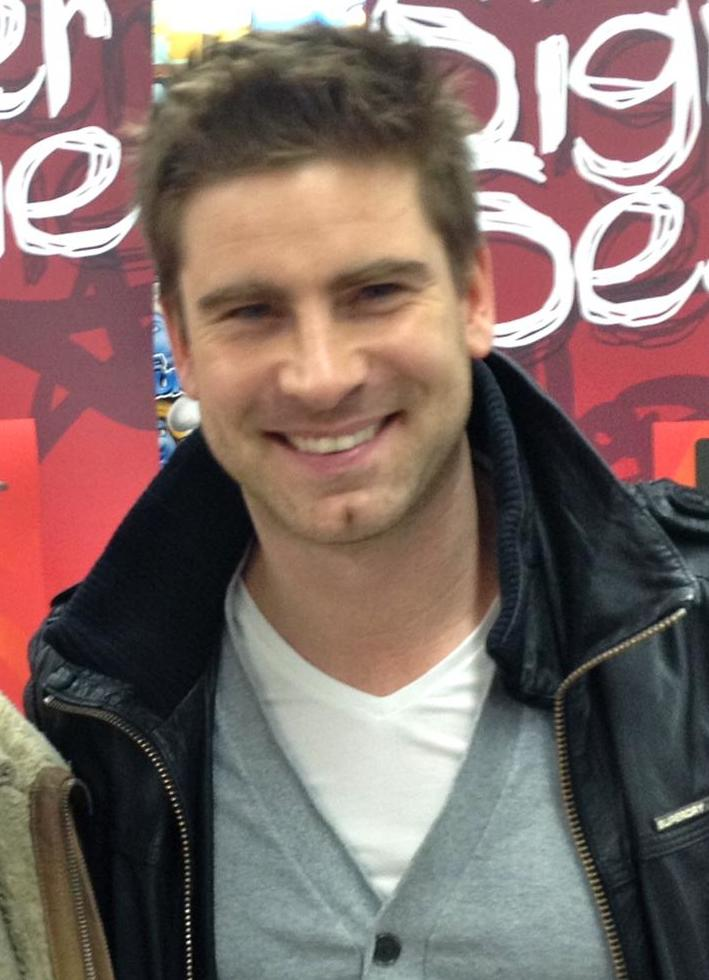
- Janssens in 2011
- Born: 21 August 1979 (age 47); Antwerp, Belgium
- Occupation: Actor
- Years active: 2002-present

Kevin Janssens (born 21 August 1979) is a Belgian actor and director. His birth name is Kevin Roels and his first important role was in a mini series called King of the World.

== Early life and education ==
Janssens studied under Guido Henderickx at Studio Herman Teirlinck in Antwerp, graduating in 2003.

== Career ==
In 2006, at age 27, Janssens played the lead role in the film (and preceding television series), King of the World, which was shot in Cuba; he also starred in Hans Herbots' Stormforce that was released in that year.

Janssens costarred alongside Matilda Lutz in Coralie Fargeat's Revenge (2017), which premiered at the 2017 Toronto International Film Festival, was awarded Best Director at Sitges Film Festival, and was selected in the Midnight section at the 2018 Sundance Film Festival. He appeared alongside Olga Kurylenko in Christian Volckman's 2019 horror film, The Room.

In 2022, Janssens played Peter, Rémi's father, in Lukas Dhont's Close, which won Grand Prix at the 75th Festival de Cannes, and was nominated for Best International Feature Film at the 95th Academy Awards.

Janssens' stage work includes his 2007 appearance and touring in a production of Pushkin’s Eugene Onegin.

== Awards and honors ==
Janssens was Belgium's nominee for the European Shooting Stars Award in 2007. He was nominated for the Magritte Award for Best Actor for his portrayal of the title character in Patrick in 2019.

An image of Janssens shot with a Nikon D850 by Pieter Clicteur during Filmfestival Oostende was a submission to the 17th Annual Smithsonian Magazine Photo Contest.

== Selected filmography ==
=== Feature films and shorts ===
Janssens has appeared in more than twenty films.

| Year | Title | Role | Notes | Ref. |
|---|---|---|---|---|
| 2006 | Stormforce | Rick Symons | | |
| 2011 | Madonna's Pig | Tony Roozen | | |
| 2015 | The Ardennes | Kenneth | | |
| 2017 | Revenge | Richard | Lead role | |
| 2017 | Above the Law | Vik | | |
| 2018 | To the Ends of the World | Chenle | | |
| 2018 | Catacombe | Mary | | |
| 2018 | The Bouncer | Geert | | |
| 2019 | The Room | Matt | | |
| 2019 | Patrick | Patrick | Nominated—Magritte Award for Best Actor | |
| 2019 | Savage State | Victor | | |
| 2022 | Close | Peter (Rémi's father) | | |

=== Television ===
Janssens has appeared in more than twenty television series.

| Year | Title | Role | Notes | Ref. |
|---|---|---|---|---|
| 2006 | King of the World | | Miniseries, 5 episodes | |
| 2014 | Vermist | Nick Buelens | 47 episodes | |
| 2009 | Flikken | Mark Devreese | 2 episodes | |
| 2019 | Undercover | Jurgen van Kamp | 6 episodes | |
| 2021 | Fair Trade | Walter Wilson | 8 episodes | |
| 2023 | Rough Diamonds | Noah Wolfson | 8 episodes | |
