= Patrick (2019 film) =

- Film poster
- Directed by: Tim Mielants
- Written by: Tim Mielants; Benjamin Sprengers
- Produced by: Bart Van Langendonck; Sarah Marks
- Starring: Kevin Janssens; Jemaine Clement
- Cinematography: Frank van den Eeden
- Edited by: Alain Dessauvage
- Music by: Geert Hellings
- Release dates: 1 July 2019 (Karlovy Vary); 28 August 2019 (Belgium)
- Running time: 97 minutes
- Countries: Belgium; France
- Languages: Dutch; French

Patrick (Dutch: De Patrick) is a 2019 Belgian comedy-drama film directed by Tim Mielants and starring Kevin Janssens, Jemaine Clement, Hannah Hoekstra, and Bouli Lanners. It had its world premiere at the 54th Karlovy Vary International Film Festival, where it competed for the Crystal Globe, winning the Best Director Award for Mielants. It received five nominations at the 10th Magritte Awards, winning Best Flemish Film.

== Plot ==
On the death of his father, Patrick is left in charge of his parents' remote naturist camp in the Belgian Ardennes. Patrick, socially awkward and withdrawn, has a neat and orderly workshop where he likes to make wooden furniture. After his hammer goes missing, his obsessive and methodical search of the campsite leads to a variety of encounters with the camp’s residents.

== Cast ==
- Kevin Janssens as Patrick
- Jemaine Clement as Dustin
- Hannah Hoekstra as Nathalie
- Jan Bijvoet as Flik
- Bouli Lanners as Mon
- Josse De Pauw as Rudy
- Pierre Bokma as Herman
- Ariane Van Vliet as Liliane
- Frank Vercruyssen as Wilfried
- Jean-Benoît Ugeux as the retailer

== Reception ==
=== Critical response ===
On the review aggregator website Rotten Tomatoes, 87% of 15 critics' reviews are positive, with an average rating of 7.3/10.

Peter Bradshaw of The Guardian described the film as "an enjoyable if self-consciously quirky black comedy," while Mark Kermode in The Observer referred to it as "A wry and oddly moving tale set in a world largely unencumbered by clothing, but riddled with intrigue, deceit, and the promise of self-discovery". In The Hollywood Reporter, Boyd van Hoeij commented that, "As befits a film about nudists, Mielants treats all nudity with such nonchalance it becomes a non-issue after just a few minutes", and Ian Freer from Empire magazine wrote that "Part mystery, part black comedy, part metaphor for loss, Patrick is a nakedly true original ... an offbeat delight."

Among the few negative reviews, Kevin Maher in The Times described the film as "mostly glib and pointless".

== Accolades ==
Award / Film Festival	Category	Recipients and nominees	Result
Crystal Globe Award	Best Film		Nominated
Crystal Globe Award	Best Director	Tim Mielants	Won
Ensor Awards	Best Film		Won
Ensor Awards	Best Director	Tim Mielants	Won
Ensor Awards	Best Screenplay	Tim Mielants and Benjamin Sprengers	Won
Ensor Awards	Best Actor	Kevin Janssens	Won
Ensor Awards	Best Actor	Pierre Bokma	Nominated
Ensor Awards	Best Actress	Ariane Van Vliet	Nominated
Ensor Awards	Best Cinematography	Frank van den Eeden	Won
Ensor Awards	Best Production Design	Hubert Pouille and Pepijn Van Looy	Won
Ensor Awards	Best Costume Design	Valérie Le Roy	Won
Ensor Awards	Best Editing	Alain Dessauvage	Nominated
Ensor Awards	Best Original Score	Geert Hellings	Nominated
Fantastic Fest	Best Film – Next Wave		Won
Fantastic Fest	Best Director – Next Wave	Tim Mielants	Won
German Independence Award	Best First Feature Film		Nominated
Golden Alexander Award	Best First		Nominated
Magritte Awards	Best Flemish Film		Won
Magritte Awards	Best Actor	Kevin Janssens	Nominated
Magritte Awards	Best Supporting Actor	Bouli Lanners	Nominated
Magritte Awards	Best Production Design	Hubert Pouille and Pepijn Van Looy	Nominated
Magritte Awards	Best Costume Design	Valérie Le Roy	Nominated
