= Alina Șerban =

Roma actor and playwright (born 1987)

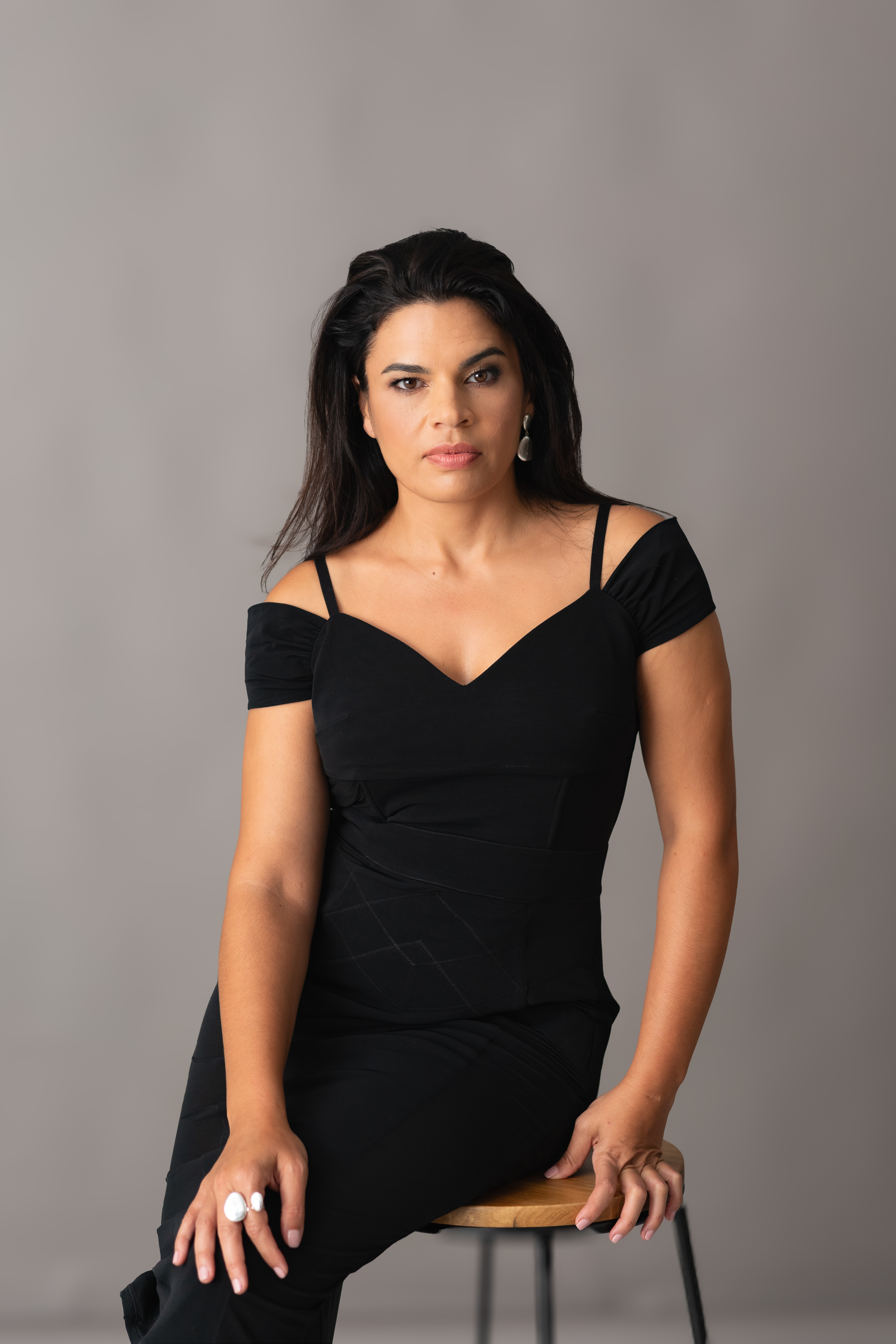
- Born: Alina Ioana Șerban; 29 October 1987 (age 38); Bucharest, Romania
- Education: I. L. Caragiale National University of Theatre and Film; Royal Academy of Dramatic Art
- Occupations: Actress; film director
- Years active: 2006–present
- Known for: Gipsy Queen; Alone at My Wedding

Alina Șerban (born 29 October 1987), is a Romanian actress. She has appeared in Alone at My Wedding (2018) and Housekeeping for Beginners (2023). She studied at the NYU Tisch School of the Arts and the Royal Academy of Dramatic Art, and is a recipient of Knight of the Order of Cultural Merit in Romania.

== Career ==
=== Alone at My Wedding ===
In 2018, Alina played the lead role of Pamela in Marta Bergman's feature film Singură la nunta mea (Seule à mon mariage; Alone at My Wedding).

The film was presented in the ACID selection at the 2018 Cannes Film Festival.

For her performance as Pamela, Alina received several international distinctions, including Best Female Performance at the Festival International du Film de Femmes de Salé, an Angela Award for Performance at the SUBTITLE European Film Festival and a special mention for performance at the Rome Independent Film Festival.

=== Gipsy Queen ===
In 2019, Alina played the lead role of Ali in the German–Austrian feature film Gipsy Queen, written and directed by Hüseyin Tabak. Her performance received four Best Actress awards, including Best Actress at the Tallinn Black Nights Film Festival and the Deutscher Schauspielpreis. She was also nominated for Best Actress in a Leading Role at the 2020 German Film Award. Alina also received the Mayor's Award at the 2020 Günter Rohrbach Film Prize for her performance.

In 2023, Alina was a member of the principal cast of Housekeeping for Beginners, written and directed by Goran Stolevski. The film was selected for the Orizzonti section of the 80th Venice International Film Festival. The festival's official programme listed Alina alongside Anamaria Marinca, Samson Selim and Vladimir Tintor in the principal cast.

=== I Matter ===
In 2026, she wrote and directed I Matter (Eu Contez), in her feature directorial debut. It had its world premiere in the Venice Spotlight section of the 83rd Venice International Film Festival on 8 September 2026.

=== Work with children and young people ===
A substantial part of the association's work is dedicated to Roma and non-Roma children and young people from institutional care and other disadvantaged backgrounds. Its programmes combine storytelling, theatre, creative writing, film screenings, personal-development activities and financial education.

In 2022, the association received the National Cultural Fund Administration Award for Addressing Young Audiences with Limited Access to Culture for its project Noi suntem eroi – Ateliere de storytelling cu tineri instituționalizați (“We Are Heroes – Storytelling Workshops with Institutionalised Young People”). According to the National Cultural Fund Administration, the project provided approximately 400 people from disadvantaged backgrounds with free access to cultural activities. Thirty-four young people from two residential and day-care centres worked directly with Alina during storytelling workshops and subsequently presented theatre performances based on their experiences.

The project contributed to the development of the annual Eu contez (“I Matter”) Youth Gala, at which participants present theatre, documentary films, music and other forms of artistic work. The third edition, held in 2024, featured work developed with 60 Roma and non-Roma children and young people from residential centres. Students from 20 schools also attended film screenings followed by discussions concerning discrimination, diversity and social inclusion.

In 2025, the association organised Me sem sukar (“I Am Beautiful”), a programme comprising theatre and creative-writing workshops, film screenings and activities addressing bullying, cultural identity and social stereotypes. The initiative involved Roma and non-Roma young people from disadvantaged communities in Romania and the diaspora. The association reported that more than 160 participants from eight locations—including Bucharest, Dâmbovița, Jilava, Călărași, Miercurea Ciuc, Iași, Ploiești and Paris—participated in 16 theatre and creative-writing workshops.

Also in 2025, Untold Stories implemented the Momentul meu (“My Moment”) programme with support from Garanti BBVA. The initiative comprised seven personal-development and financial-education workshops held at the Casa Iosif and Marcellin centres, with approximately 30–35 young people participating in each session.
