= Reflection in a Dead Diamond =

2025 film by Hélène Cattet and Bruno Forzani

- French theatrical release poster
- French: Reflet dans un diamant mort
- Directed by: Hélène Cattet; Bruno Forzani
- Written by: Hélène Cattet; Bruno Forzani
- Produced by: Pierre Foulon
- Starring: Fabio Testi; Yannick Renier; Koen De Bouw; Maria de Medeiros; Thi Mai Nguyen; Céline Camara
- Cinematography: Manu Dacosse
- Edited by: Bernard Beets
- Production companies: Kozak Films; Les Films Fauves; Dandy Projects; Tobina Films; Savage Film; To Be Continued
- Distributed by: UFO Distribution (France); Cinéart (Belgium); Lucky Red (Italy)
- Release dates: 16 February 2025 (Berlinale); 30 April 2025 (Belgium); 25 June 2025 (France); 3 July 2025 (Italy)
- Running time: 87 minutes
- Countries: Belgium; Luxembourg; Italy; France
- Languages: French; Italian; English
- Box office: $70,269

Reflection in a Dead Diamond (French: Reflet dans un diamant mort) is a 2025 action mystery thriller film written and directed by Hélène Cattet and Bruno Forzani. A homage to 1960s Eurospy films, it follows John Diman (Fabio Testi), a septuagenarian retired spy living on the French Riviera, who fears his former enemies are back for a final fight when his intriguing next-door neighbor mysteriously disappears.

The film had its world premiere in the main competition of the 75th Berlin International Film Festival on 16 February 2025, where it was nominated for the Golden Bear. It was released theatrically in Belgium on 30 April 2025 by Cinéart in France on 25 June 2025 by UFO Distribution and in Italy on 3 July 2025 by Lucky Red.

== Premise ==
John D, a retired spy in his 70s residing in a luxurious hotel on the French Riviera, is fascinated by his new neighbor, who kindles his memories of the Riviera's vibrant days in the 1960s. When his neighbor vanishes without a trace, John is forced to confront his past demons.

== Cast ==
- Fabio Testi as John Diman
  - Yannick Renier as young John Diman
- Koen De Bouw as Markus Strand
- Maria de Medeiros as the author
- Thi Mai Nguyen as Serpentik
- Céline Camara
- Kézia Quental as Cantatrice

== Production ==
In January 2023, screen.brussels invested €150,000 in the film. Five days of the filming were done in Brussels out of a total of forty days. Filming wrapped in December 2023. It is produced by Kozak Films, Les Films Fauves, Dandy Projects, Tobina Film, Savage Film, and To Be Continued with the backing of screen.brussels.

== Release ==
Reflection in a Dead Diamond had its world premiere in the main competition of 75th Berlin International Film Festival on 16 February 2025. In May 2024, the Italian sales company True Colours acquired worldwide rights to the film. Ahead of the film's world premiere, Shudder acquired distribution rights to North America, the United Kingdom, Ireland, Australia and New Zealand, and released the film on its platform in those territories on 5 December 2025.

The film competed in the official competition Grand Prix competition at the Luxembourg City Film Festival on 7 March 2025. It also competed in the International Narrative Competition section of the 24th Tribeca Festival and was screened on 9 June 2025. The film was also selected at the 29th Fantasia International Film Festival for screening on 17 July 2025, showcased at the 31st Sarajevo Film Festival in the "Kinoscope" section in August 2025, and screened in the "Strands: Cult" section of the 2025 BFI London Film Festival on 13 October.

On 13 October 2025, the film competed in the 58th Sitges Film Festival in the Oficial Fantàstic Competició section, vying for the various awards given in the section. It was also screened in the Twilight Zone section of the 2025 Stockholm International Film Festival on 5 November and was presented in the Macabre Deams section of the 56th International Film Festival of India in November 2025.

Reflection in a Dead Diamond was released theatrically in Belgium on 30 April 2025 by Cinéart in France on 25 June 2025 by UFO Distribution and in Italy on 3 July 2025 by Lucky Red.

== Reception ==
=== Critical response ===
On the review aggregator website Rotten Tomatoes, 85% of 46 critics' reviews are positive, with an average rating of 7.7/10. The website's consensus reads: "A dazzling monument to lurid cinema that gleams with stylistic verve, Reflection in a Dead Diamond might be directors Hélène Cattet and Bruno Forzani's most cohesive and thrilling genre pastiche yet." Metacritic, which uses a weighted average, assigned the film a score of 78 out of 100, based on 9 critics, indicating "generally favorable" reviews.

=== Accolades ===
Award	Date of ceremony	Category	Recipient(s)	Result	Ref.
Berlin International Film Festival	23 February 2025	Golden Bear	Reflection in a Dead Diamond	Nominated	
Fangoria Chainsaw Awards	25 October 2026	Best International Movie	Reflection in a Dead Diamond	Nominated	
Fangoria Chainsaw Awards	25 October 2026	Best Streaming Premiere	Reflection in a Dead Diamond	Nominated	
Gotham TV Awards	1 June 2026	Outstanding Original Film, Broadcast or Streaming	Hélène Cattet, Bruno Forzani, and Pierre Foulon	Won	
Gotham TV Awards	1 June 2026	Outstanding Performance in an Original Film	Yannick Renier	Nominated	
Luxembourg City Film Festival	16 March 2025	Grand Prix	Reflection in a Dead Diamond	Nominated	
René Awards	7 March 2026	Best Actor	Yannick Renier	Won	
René Awards	7 March 2026	Best Cinematography	Manuel Dacosse	Won	
René Awards	7 March 2026	Best Costume Design	Jackye Fauconnier	Won	
René Awards	7 March 2026	Best Production Design	Laurie Colson	Won	
René Awards	7 March 2026	Best Sound	Dan Bruylandt, Olivier Thys, Mathieu Cox, and Aline Gavroy	Nominated	
Seattle Film Critics Society	15 December 2025	Best Film Editing	Bernard Beets	Nominated	
Sitges Film Festival	19 October 2025	Best Feature Film	Reflection in a Dead Diamond	Nominated	
Sitges Film Festival	19 October 2025	José Luis Guarner Critics Award for Best Film	Reflection in a Dead Diamond	Won (Note: Tied with The Life of Chuck)	
