= Raphaël Thierry =

French painter (born 1972)

- Born: 1972
- Died: 2021 (aged 48–49)
- Occupations: Visual artist, painter and illustrator

Raphaël Thierry (1972-2021) was a French visual artist, painter and illustrator. He worked in various media, including drawings, paintings, sculptures, performances, and installations. He practiced under multiple artistic identities. Raphael Thierry lived between Paris and Avignon, France.

== Biography ==
Born in Tunisia in 1972, Thierry grew up in the South of France. He moved to Paris in 1990, where he studied graphic design at the Académie Julian. Graduated with honors from the École Supérieure d'Arts Graphiques Met de Penninghen in 1994 and recipient of the Villa Medici grant in fine art at the French Academy in Rome in 2004, he decided to focus exclusively on his artistic work. He produced numerous exhibitions and performances while developing his artistic practice under multiple identities. He has worked for many years with the writer and philosopher Federico Nicolao, with which he published in 2004 the book La Medesima Ombra. During his stay at the French Academy in Rome, he met the composer Jérôme Combier, with whom he created several visual performances during the concerts of Vies Silencieuses. In 2008, he created the duo ©® with the French director Christian Volckman (Renaissance), an artistic collaboration source of a series of thematic films and exhibitions named Theflow. In 2010, he produced the paintings and the video for Frank Wedekind's play Lulu – une tragédie monstre directed by Stéphane Braunschweig at the Théâtre national de la Colline.

Under the name of Rapharty, he created and illustrated a collection of books for children, Les Aventures de Superchien (The Superdog Adventures) since 2000.

Raphaël Thierry died on June 14, 2021

== Education ==
- 1994 – Gold Dragon – Graphic Design master's degree, ESAG Met de Penninghen – Académie Julian, Paris, France.

== Awards ==
- 2005 – Recipient of the Villa Medici grant and residency in Fine Art, French Academy in Rome, Italy.
- 2004 – Prize Met de Penninghen, Award 2004, Paris, France.

== Works ==
=== Solo exhibitions ===
- 2021 – From the posterity of the sun - .4rtgallery, L’Isle-sur-la-Sorgue - France.
- 2020 – Flayed - Galerie Un lieu une œuvre, Ménerbes - France.
- 2018 – From Nature - avec Guillaume Castel, Galerie Ariane C-Y, Paris - France
- 2017 – Eyes of war with ©®, War On Screen, Festival international de Cinema, Châlons-en-Champagne - France.
- 2017 – Rustles, Galerie Un lieu une œuvre, Ménerbes - France.
- 2015 – Upward, Galerie Ariane C-Y, Paris - France.
- 2014 – Reach for the Moon with ©® (Christian Volckman & Raphael Thierry), Waltman Ortega Fine Art, Miami - United States.
- 2013 – Backstage with ©®, Le Quai - Forum des arts vivants, Angers - France.
- 2012 – Camera Obscura, Galerie Pascal Lainé, Ménerbes - France.
- 2011 – Window, Bernard Chauchet Contemporary Art, London, United Kingdom.
- 2011 – Holyfood with Christian Volckman, Waltman Ortega Fine Art, Miami, United States.
- 2011 – Ein blick in der Büchse, Galerie ALFA project, Paris, France.
- 2011 – Holyfood with Christian Volckman, Olivier Waltman, Paris, France.
- 2010 – Caverne, Campredon Centre d'art – hors les murs, L'Isle-sur-la-Sorgue, France.
- 2010 – Ardet In Hostem, Musée de Campredon, Centre d'art, L'Isle-sur-la-Sorgue, France.
- 2010 – Theflow Food with the French director Christian Volckman, La Passerelle, Fontevraud Abbey, France.
- 2010 – Amor Fati, La Maison sur la Sorgue, Galerie Annie Lagier, L'Isle-sur-la-Sorgue, France.
- 2009 – Variations, Thirteen Langton Street Gallery, London, United Kingdom.
- 2009 – Theflow Hunt with the French director Christian Volckman, One Shot Gallery, Paris, France.
- 2007 – Fields of Dust, Espace Carte blanche Gallery, Paris, France.
- 2007 – Identita # 1, Art Container Gallery, Rome, Italy.
- 2006 – Fra i tuoi colori le ombre, Royaumont Abbey, France.
- 2006 – Visions in dust, Atelier del Bosco, Villa Medici, Rome, Italy, curated by Federico Nicolao, exhibited books : Etudes and La Medesima Ombra.

=== Group exhibitions ===
- 2011 – Art London, Bernard Chauchet Contemporary Art Gallery, Chelsea, London, United Kingdom.
- 2011 – Drawing Now Paris, Galerie ALFA, Paris, France.
- 2011 – Art Chicago, Galerie Olivier Waltman, Chicago, United States.
- 2010 – Art Paris, Galerie Olivier Waltman, Paris, France.
- 2010 – Art Miami, Waltman Ortega Fine Art Gallery, Miami, United States.
- 2010 – Art London, Bernard Chauchet Contemporary Art Gallery, Chelsea, London, United Kingdom.
- 2010 – Blitz, Alfa Gallery, Paris, France.
- 2009 – Art London, Bernard Chauchet Contemporary Art Gallery, Chelsea, London, United Kingdom.
- 2008 – Art London, Thirteen Langton Street Gallery, Chelsea, London, United Kingdom.
- 2007 – Art London, Thirteen Langton Street Gallery, Chelsea, London, United Kingdom.
- 2006 – The landscape of the mediterranean, with Vincent Bioulés, Antoine De La Boulaye and Pierre Buraglio, Thirteen Langton Street Gallery, Chelsea, London, United Kingdom.
- 2005 – À la Surface – Notte Bianca, with Mirjam Fruttiger and Jérôme Combier, Grandes Galeries, Villa Medici, Rome, Italy.
- 2003 – Parcours de l'Art, Saint-Louis Cloister, Avignon-France

=== Performances ===
- 2014 – ©® Live performance "Reach for the Moon" at Art Wynwood, organized by Waltman Ortega Fine Art, Miami, United States.
- 2011 – Reflexions with Mara Dobrescu and Ràzvan Popovici, Sonoro – 6th, Bucharest, Romania.
- 2010 – Traces with Sylvain Lemêtre and Jérôme Combier, Nuit des Musées, L'Isle-sur-la-Sorgue, France.
- 2009 – Vies silencieuses, Bludenzer Tage zeitgemäßer Musik (contemporary music festival), Bludenz, Austria.
- 2009 – Dust Visions, Thirteen Langton Street, London, United Kingdom.
- 2008 – Vies silencieuses, Archipel Music Festival, Geneva, Switzerland.
- 2007 – Blank Pages, Espace Carte Blanche Gallery, Paris, France.
- 2007 – Identita # 1, Art Container Gallery, Rome, Italy
- 2006 – Vies silencieuses, Royaumont Music Festival, Royaumont Abbey, France.
- 2005 – Silent lifes – Vies silencieuses, Why Note Music Festival, Dijon, France, with the French composer Jérôme Combier.
- 2005 – À la surface, Notte Bianca, Grandes Galeries, Villa Medici, Rome, Italy.

=== Publications ===
- 2010 – Corps, Sillages Éditions, Vaucluse, France
- 2008 – Épreuves du Mystère, Édition Éreme, Paris, France
- 2007 – Etudes I and Etudes II, with the writer Federico Nicolao
- 2005 – Version Magazine : Coloring Book with Mircea Cantor
- 2004 – La Medesima Ombra, Éditions Io, Paris, France, with the writer Federico Nicolao.
- 2003 – Exercice de style, in Chorus n° 1, Genoa, Italy.
- 2003 – Aube in Pensée art contemporain, Barcelona, Spain.
- 2001 – Mistral,Polaire, Ici et là and Joyeux Noël, Les aventures de Superchien, Magnard jeunesse, Paris, France.
- 2001 – Air de printemps, Parfum d'automne, Ami d'hiver and Soleil d'été, Les aventures de Superchien, Magnard jeunesse, Paris, France.
- 2000 – Solitude, Pleine Lune, Déluge , Mirage, De passage and Papillon Vert, Les aventures de Superchien, Magnard jeunesse, Paris, France.

== Press ==
- 2010 – "Blitz" in Artpress no. 371, France.
- 2008 – Festival Archipel in Tribune de Genève, Geneva, Switzerland.
- 2007 – "Raphaël Thierry, Fields of Dust" in Paris Art, France.
- 2007 – "Identita" in Exhibart, Italy.
- 2007 – "Il libro d'artista, un oggetto del futuro" in Domus, no. 895, Italy.
- 2006 – "Nelle stanze dei giovani talenti Che sognano in grande", La repubblica delle donne, no. 496, Italy.
- 2005 – "La Villa Médicis, un théâtre où tout reste à inventer", in Point de vue magazine, no. 2991, France.
