= Christian Volckman =

French painter (born 1971)

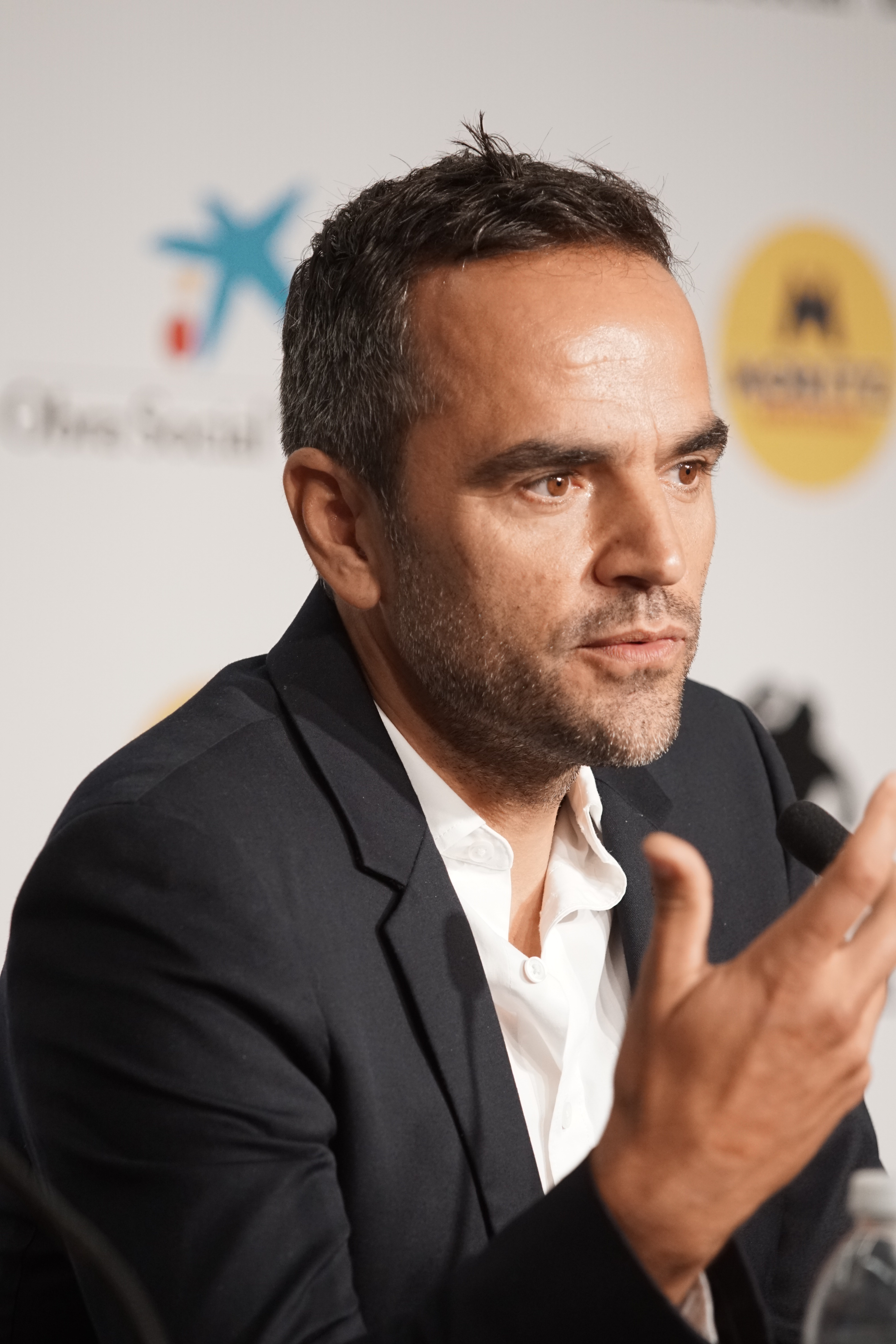
- Image of Christian Volckman at Festival de Cinema de Sitges 2019
- Born: 1971 (age 54–55)
- Education: Ecole Superieure D'Arts Graphiques
- Occupations: Director, painter

Christian Volckman (b. 1971) is a French film director, author, and painter. He is a graduate of Ecole Supérieure d'Arts Graphiques in Paris.

== Career ==
He is mainly known for his motion capture animation feature film Renaissance, a 2006 dystopian film noir. The film features the English voices of Daniel Craig, Romola Garai, Jonathan Pryce, and Ian Holm. It was awarded the Cristal for Best Feature at the Annecy International Animated Film Festival. in 2006, as well as the Best Feature Film Award at the 5th Festival of European Animated Feature Films and TV Specials in 2007. The film, distributed by Miramax, received mixed reviews.

His other film work includes music videos and two shorts, Le cobaye, which received a Prix du Jury at Annecy in 1995, and Maaz, which has been shown at nearly 100 festivals and won 30 prizes, including two for sound.

Volckman has directed several music videos, including "Miss Chang" and " Once upon a Time" for the group Chinese Man. "Paris sera toujours Paris", "Sous le ciel de Paris" and "Champs Elysées" for the singer ZAZ. "Requiem" is the song for Alma that represents France at the Eurovision 2017.

In 2008, he and visual artist Raphael Thierry started the website ©®, an artistic collaboration developing thematic films and exhibitions named THEFLOW.

In 2019, he directed the film The Room, with Olga Kurylenko and Kevin Janssens, which was shown at the 2019 Sitges Film Festival.

== Filmography ==
| Year | Title | Position | Note |
|---|---|---|---|
| 1994 | Le cobaye | Director and writer | Student short film |
| 1995 | Rayman | Animator | Video game |
| 1999 | Maaz | Director, writer, producer and actor | Short film |
| 2003 | The Man Without a Face | Poster designer | Short film |
| 2006 | Renaissance | Director, art director and original production designer | Feature film |
| 2006-2017 | Music videos for Zaz, Chineseman, Pep's, Alma | Director and original production designer | Music videos |
| 2019 | The Room | Writer, director and original production designer | Feature film |
| 2020 | The Kid | Director and art director | Feature film |

== See also ==
- Motion capture
- List of animated feature films
