= Alone at My Wedding =

- Film poster
- Directed by: Marta Bergman
- Written by: Marta Bergman; Laurent Brandenbourger
- Produced by: Jean-Yves Roubin; Cassandre Warnauts
- Edited by: Frédéric Fichefet
- Release dates: 10 May 2018 (Cannes); 6 February 2019 (Belgium)
- Running time: 121 minutes
- Country: Belgium
- Languages: French; Romanian; Flemish

Alone at My Wedding (French: Seule à mon mariage) is a 2018 Belgian drama film written and directed by Marta Bergman, starring Alina Serban and Tom Vermeir. The film had its world premiere at the 2018 Cannes Film Festival. At the 10th Magritte Awards, Alone at My Wedding received three nominations, including Best Film, winning Best Costume Design for Claudine Tychon.

== Cast ==
- Alina Șerban : Pamela
- Tom Vermeir : Bruno
- Marian Samu : Marian
- Jonas Bloquet : Jean-Loup

== Accolades ==
| Award / Film Festival | Category | Recipients and nominees | Result |
|---|---|---|---|
| Magritte Award | Best Film | | Nominated |
| Magritte Award | Best First Feature Film | | Nominated |
| Magritte Award | Best Costume Design | Claudine Tychon | Won |
| Namur Film Festival | Best First Feature Film | | Nominated |
| Rome Independent Film Festival | Best Film | | Nominated |
| Rome Independent Film Festival | Best Actress | Alina Serban | Won |
| Tuebingen Film Festival | Best Film | | Nominated |
| Tuebingen Film Festival | Best Screenplay | Marta Bergman and Laurent Brandenbourger | Nominated |
