= Emma Peeters =

- Directed by: Nicole Palo
- Written by: Nicole Palo
- Starring: Monia Chokri
- Cinematography: Tobie Marier-Robitaille
- Edited by: Frédérique Broos
- Release dates: 8 September 2018 (Venice); 2 November 2018 (Canada); 19 April 2019 (Belgium)
- Running time: 90 minutes
- Countries: Belgium; Canada
- Language: French

Emma Peeters is a 2018 romantic comedy film written and directed by Nicole Palo. It is an international production between Belgium and Canada, starring Monia Chokri in the title role of Emma. The film had its world premiere at the 75th Venice International Film Festival.

== Cast ==
- Monia Chokri as Emma
- Fabrice Adde as Alex
- Stéphanie Crayencour as Lulu
- Andréa Ferréol as Bernadette
- Anne Sylvain as Maman
- Jean-Henri Compère as Papa
- Thomas Mustin as Bob
- Jean-Noël Delfanne as Serge

== Accolades ==
Award / Film Festival	Category	Recipients and nominees	Result
Golden Rooster Awards	Best International Film		Nominated
Magritte Award	Best Supporting Actress	Stéphanie Crayencour	Nominated
Magritte Award	Best Costume Design	Gaëlle Fierens	Nominated
Monte-Carlo Film Festival	Best Film		Nominated
Monte-Carlo Film Festival	Best Director	Nicole Palo	Won
Venice Film Festival	Venice Days – Best Film		Nominated
