= We Believe You =

2025 Belgian film

- Festival release poster
- French: On vous croit
- Directed by: Arnaud Dufeys; Charlotte Devillers
- Screenplay by: Arnaud Dufeys; Charlotte Devillers
- Produced by: Arnaud Dufeys; Arnaud Ponthière
- Starring: Myriem Akheddiou; Laurent Capelluto; Natali Broods; Ulysse Goffin; Adèle Pinckaers
- Cinematography: Pépin Struye
- Edited by: Nicolas Bier
- Music by: Lolita Del Pino
- Production companies: Makintosh Films; Shelter Prod
- Distributed by: The Party Film Sales
- Release date: 17 February 2025 (Berlinale)
- Running time: 78 minutes
- Country: Belgium
- Language: French

We Believe You (French: On vous croit) is a 2025 Belgian drama film directed by Arnaud Dufeys, Charlotte Devillers in their first feature. The film follows Alice, who stands before a judge, knowing there is no room for error. She must speak up for her children, as her custody is being called into question.

It was selected in Perspectives at the 75th Berlin International Film Festival and was screened on 17 February 2025. At the 15th René Awards, We Believe You won a leading six awards, including Best Film and Best Director for Dufeys and Devillers.

== Synopsis ==
Alice, a 40-year-old mother, fights to protect her children in a justice system that scrutinizes her instead of their father. As she struggles to make their fears heard, the film explores the challenges women face and how the legal system handles family and domestic violence.

== Cast ==
- Myriem Akheddiou as Alice
- Laurent Capelluto
- Natali Broods as The judge
- Ulysse Goffin as the children
- Adèle Pinckaers as the children

== Production ==
The film written, directed and produced by Arnaud Dufeys, Charlotte Devillers, stars Myriem Akheddiou and Laurent Capelluto. The film was produced by Makintosh with support from the Film and Audiovisual Centre. The film has backing from the Belgian National Lottery, Be TV, RTBF, Proximus and the federal Tax Shelter initiative via Shelter Prod/ING. It was filmed in Brussels and wrapped up in May 2024.

== Release ==
We Believe You had its world premiere on 17 February 2025, as part of the 75th Berlin International Film Festival, in Perspectives.

The film competed in Feature Film Competition 2025 at the 26th edition of the International Music & Cinema Festival in Marseille that took place from March 24 to 29, 2025.

It was presented in Official Section of 22nd Seville European Film Festival on 8 November 2025, and on 9 November 2025, it was presented in European Discoveries section of Arras Film Festival.

== Accolades ==
The film selected in the newly formed Perspectives competition will compete for Best First Feature Award.

Award	Date of ceremony	Category	Recipient	Result	Ref.
Berlin International Film Festival	23 February 2025	GWFF Best First Feature Award Special Mention	We Believe You	Special Mention	
Seville European Film Festival	15 November 2025	Golden Giraldillo	We Believe You	Won	
Seville European Film Festival	15 November 2025	Best Screenplay	Charlotte Devillers, Arnaud Dufeys	Won	
Seville European Film Festival	15 November 2025	Best Actress	Myriem Akheddiou	Won	
Cork International Film Festival	16 November 2025	Spirit of the Festival Award – Best Film	We Believe You	Won	
René Awards	7 March 2026	Best Film	Charlotte Devillers, Arnaud Dufeys, and Arnaud Ponthière	Won	
René Awards	7 March 2026	Best Director	Charlotte Devillers and Arnaud Dufeys	Won	
René Awards	7 March 2026	Best Actress	Myriem Akheddiou	Won	
René Awards	7 March 2026	Best Supporting Actor	Laurent Capelluto	Won	
René Awards	7 March 2026	Best Supporting Actress	Natali Broods	Nominated	
René Awards	7 March 2026	Most Promising Actor	Ulysse Goffin	Nominated	
René Awards	7 March 2026	Most Promising Actress	Adèle Pinckaers	Nominated	
René Awards	7 March 2026	Best Screenplay	Charlotte Devillers and Arnaud Dufeys	Won	
René Awards	7 March 2026	Best First Feature Film	Charlotte Devillers, Arnaud Dufeys, and Arnaud Ponthière	Nominated	
René Awards	7 March 2026	Best Cinematography	Pépin Struye	Nominated	
René Awards	7 March 2026	Best Editing	Nicolas Bier	Won	
