= César Díaz (film director) =

Belgian-Guatemalan film director

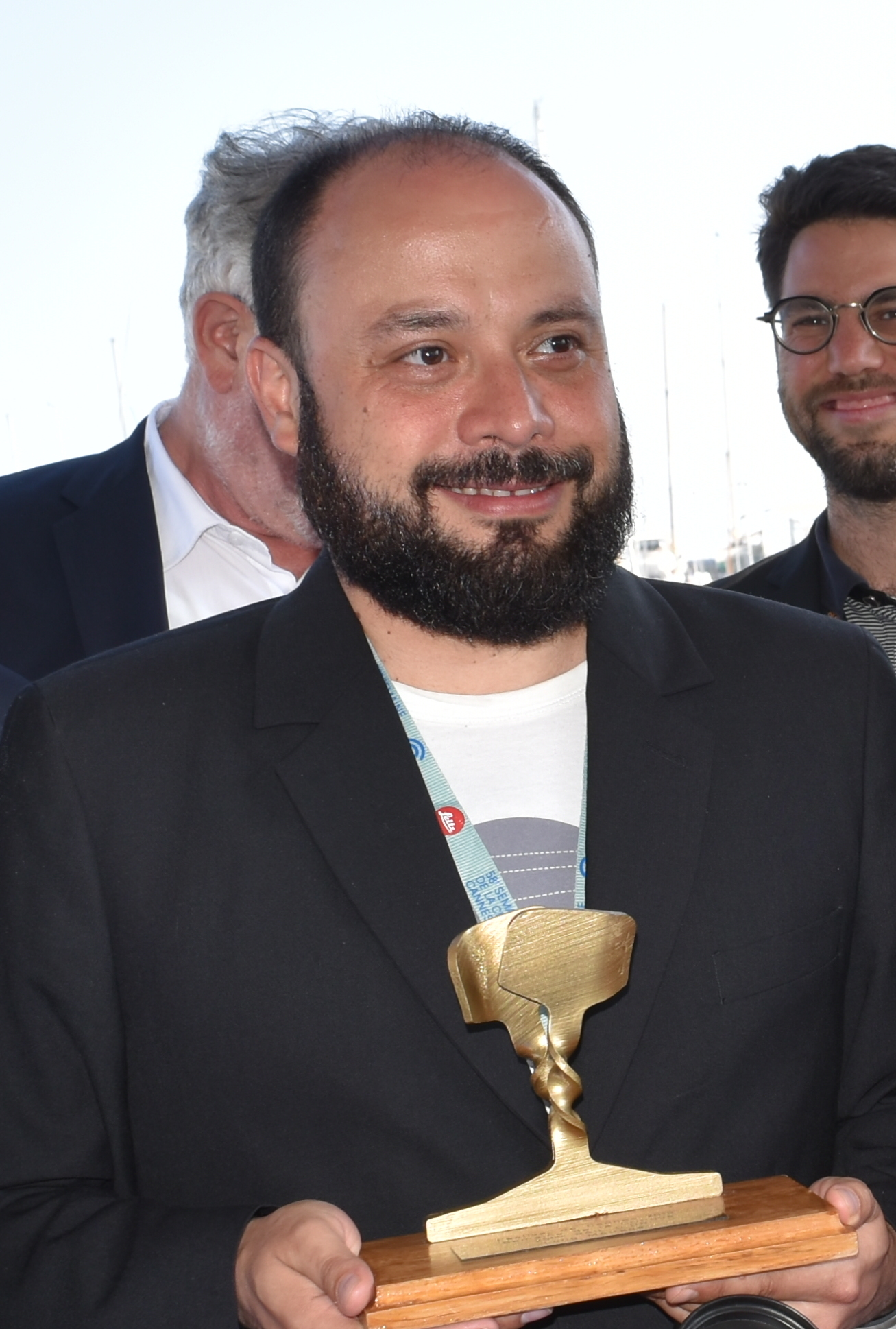
- Born: Augusto César Díaz; 20 September 1978 (age 47); Guatemala City, Guatemala
- Education: Free University of Brussels
- Occupations: Director; writer; editor
- Years active: 2006–present

César Díaz (born 20 September 1978) is a Belgian-Guatemalan film director, screenwriter and editor.

Born and raised in Guatemala City, Díaz moved to Belgium in 1998 as a student at the Free University of Brussels. In 2011, after developing an interest in filmmaking, he attended La Fémis film school in Paris where he studied in the school's Atelier Scénario, a year-long screenwriting workshop. Since the mid-2000s, Díaz has worked on a number of documentary films, before making his feature-length debut in 2019 with Our Mothers. The film premiered at the 2019 Cannes Film Festival, where Díaz won the Caméra d'Or.

Our Mothers received the André Cavens Award for Best Film given by the Belgian Film Critics Association (UCC) and was selected as the Belgian entry for the Best International Feature Film at the 92nd Academy Awards. It received six nominations at the 10th Magritte Awards, including Best Film and Best Director for Díaz, winning Best First Feature Film.

At 2023 Series Mania Forum, his upcoming project The Invisible Ink won a €50,000 grant development grant. The eight-part episodic is produced by Fernando Epstein.

== Filmography ==
- Pourquoi les hommes brûlent-ils? (2010)
- Territorio liberado (2014)
- Our Mothers (2019)
- Mexico 86 (TBA) - Post-production
