= Elsa Houben =

Belgian actress (born 2003)

- Born: April 29, 2003 (age 23); Huy, Belgium
- Occupation: Actress
- Years active: 2014–present
- Notable work: Young Mothers as Julie

Elsa Houben (born April 29, 2003) is a Belgian actress. She was nominated Most Promising Actress at the 12th Magritte Awards for her role in Dark Heart of the Forest (2022).

== Early life ==
Elsa Houben was born on April 29, 2003, in Huy, near Liège, Belgium. She attended the Atheneum Royal in her hometown.

In 2019, she decided to pursue distance learning and practices dance, particularly classical and hip-hop.

== Career ==
In 2017, she made her first appearance in the Antony Cordier's Gaspard at the Wedding alongside Félix Moati, and Marina Foïs. In 2019, she became famous after portraying Victoire Brimont in the television series Clem.

In 2022, she appeared in the film Dark Heart of the Forest by Serge Mirzabekiantz. Her performance was earned her a nomination for Most Promising Actress at the 2023 Magritte Awards.

In 2025, she starred in Jean-Luc Dardenne's drama film Young Mothers which premiered in competition at the 2025 Cannes Film Festival.

== Filmography ==
=== Film ===
Year	Title	Role	Notes	Ref.
2017	Gaspard at the Wedding	Coline		
2017	Barrage	Agathe		
2019	Mad Mom	Manon		
2019	Love at Second Sight	Intellectual student		
2020	How to Make Out	Jen		
2021	Dark Heart of the Forest	Camille	Lead role	
2025	Young Mothers	Julie	Lead role	

=== Television ===
Year	Title	Role	Notes	Ref.
2014	The White Queen	Katherine Woodville	2 episode	
2016	Public Enemy	Noémie Vanhassche	2 episode	
2017	Transferts	Dana Woyzeck	1 episode	
2019	UFOs	Margaux	1 episode	
2021–present	Clem	Victoire Brimont	Lead role	
