= I Matter =

2026 drama film by Alina Șerban

- Romanian theatrical release poster
- Romanian: Eu Contez
- Directed by: Alina Șerban
- Written by: Alina Şerban
- Produced by: Ada Solomon; Carla Fotea; Harry Flöter; Jörg Siepmann; Cassandre Warnauts; Jean-Yves Roubin
- Starring: Denisa Farcaș
- Cinematography: Nona Cătușanu
- Edited by: Letiția Ștefănescu
- Music by: Vlaicu Golcea
- Production companies: microFILM; 2PilotsFilmproduction; Frakas Productions
- Release date: 8 September 2026 (Venice)
- Running time: 101 minutes
- Countries: Romania; Germany; Belgium
- Languages: Romanian; Romani

I Matter (Romanian: Eu Contez) is a 2026 drama film written and directed by Alina Șerban, in her feature debut, loosely inspired by her life, it is an adaptation of her 2021 short film of same name. A co-production of Romania, Germany, and Belgium, it stars Denisa Farcaș as Rebeca, a young Roma woman studying to be an actress.

The film had its world premiere in the Venice Spotlight section of the 83rd Venice International Film Festival on 8 September 2026, where it won the section's Audience Award.

== Premise ==
A young Roma woman leaves her orphanage to study acting and hopes to reconnect with her family following her father's release from prison.

== Cast ==
- Denisa Farcaș as Rebeca
- Sorin Mihai
- Angelina Pavel
- Vanessa Dancea

== Production ==
In an interview with Cineuropa, director Alina Șerban shared that I Matter was inspired by her personal experiences and five years of research. She directed a short film of the same name in 2021 and also created documentaries about young Romani people. With the film, Șerban aimed to "show the humanity" of Romani people and celebrate the community.

Șerban participated at the MFI Film LAB at the Mediterranean Film Institute Script 2 Film Workshops to develop the film script in June 2023. The project participated at the AGORA Co-Production Forum, held during the Thessaloniki International Film Festival in November 2023. It was awarded with the ArteKino International Award and received €6,000 grant. In December 2023, the project was presented at the Les Arcs Co-Production Village, held during the Les Arcs Film Festival. In June 2025, it was reported that the production received support from the Wallonia-Brussels Film and Audiovisual Centre.

== Release ==
I Matter had its world premiere in the Venice Spotlight section of the 83rd Venice International Film Festival on 8 September 2026. Prior to its world premiere, Pluto Film had acquired the film's international sales.

== Accolades ==
Award / Film Festival	Date of ceremony	Category	Recipient(s)	Result	Ref.
Venice Film Festival	12 September 2026	Venice Spotlight Audience Award	Alina Șerban	Won	
