= Young Mothers =

Belgian drama film

- Theatrical release poster
- French: Jeunes mères
- Directed by: Luc Dardenne; Jean-Pierre Dardenne
- Written by: Luc Dardenne; Jean-Pierre Dardenne
- Produced by: Luc Dardenne; Jean-Pierre Dardenne; Denis Freyd; Delphine Tomson
- Starring: Lucie Laruelle; Babette Verbeek; Elsa Houben; Janaïna Halloy Fokan; Samia Hilmi
- Cinematography: Benoît Dervaux
- Edited by: Marie-Hélène Dozo
- Production companies: Les Films du Fleuve; Archipel 35; The Reunion
- Distributed by: Cinéart (Belgium); Diaphana Distribution (France)
- Release dates: 23 May 2025 (Cannes); 3 June 2025 (Belgium)
- Running time: 106 minutes
- Countries: Belgium; France
- Language: French
- Box office: $1.3 million

Young Mothers (also known as The Young Mother's Home, French: Jeunes mères), is a 2025 drama film produced, written and directed by Jean-Pierre and Luc Dardenne. Starring Lucie Laruelle, Babette Verbeek, Elsa Houben, Janaïna Halloy Fokan and Samia Hilmi, it follows five poor teenager mothers in a maternity shelter in Banneux, Belgium.

The film had its world premiere in the main competition of the 2025 Cannes Film Festival on 23 May, where it won the Best Screenplay prize and the Prize of the Ecumenical Jury. It was theatrically released in Belgium on 4 June by Cinéart.

It was selected as the Belgian entry for the Best International Feature Film at the 98th Academy Awards, but it was not nominated.

== Premise ==
Five young women; Jessica, Perla, Julie, Naïma and Ariane and their children are housed in a center for young mothers.

== Cast ==
- Lucie Laruelle as Perla
- Babette Verbeek as Jessica
- Elsa Houben as Julie
- Janaïna Halloy Fokan as Ariane
- Samia Hilmi as Naima
- Jef Jacobs as Dylan
- Günter Duret as Robin
- Christelle Cornil as Nathalie, Ariane's mother
- India Hair as Morgane, Jessica's mother
- Joely Mbundu as Angèle, Perla's older sister
- Claire Bodson as Isabelle
- Eva Zingaro as Asun
- Adrienne D'Anna as Yasmine
- Mathilde Legrand as Lucie
- Hélène Cattelain as Silvia
- Selma Alaoui as Betty
- Juliette Duret as Daphné
- Fabrizio Rongione
- Marc Zinga

== Production ==
The film is produced by the Dardenne Brothers alongside Delphine Tomson for Les Films du Fleuve, in co-production with Archipel 35 and The Reunion. It received funding from Walloon regional investment fund Wallimage. In March 2025, the film title was reported as Young Mothers.

Filming took place in Banneux in Wallonia in August 2024.

== Release ==
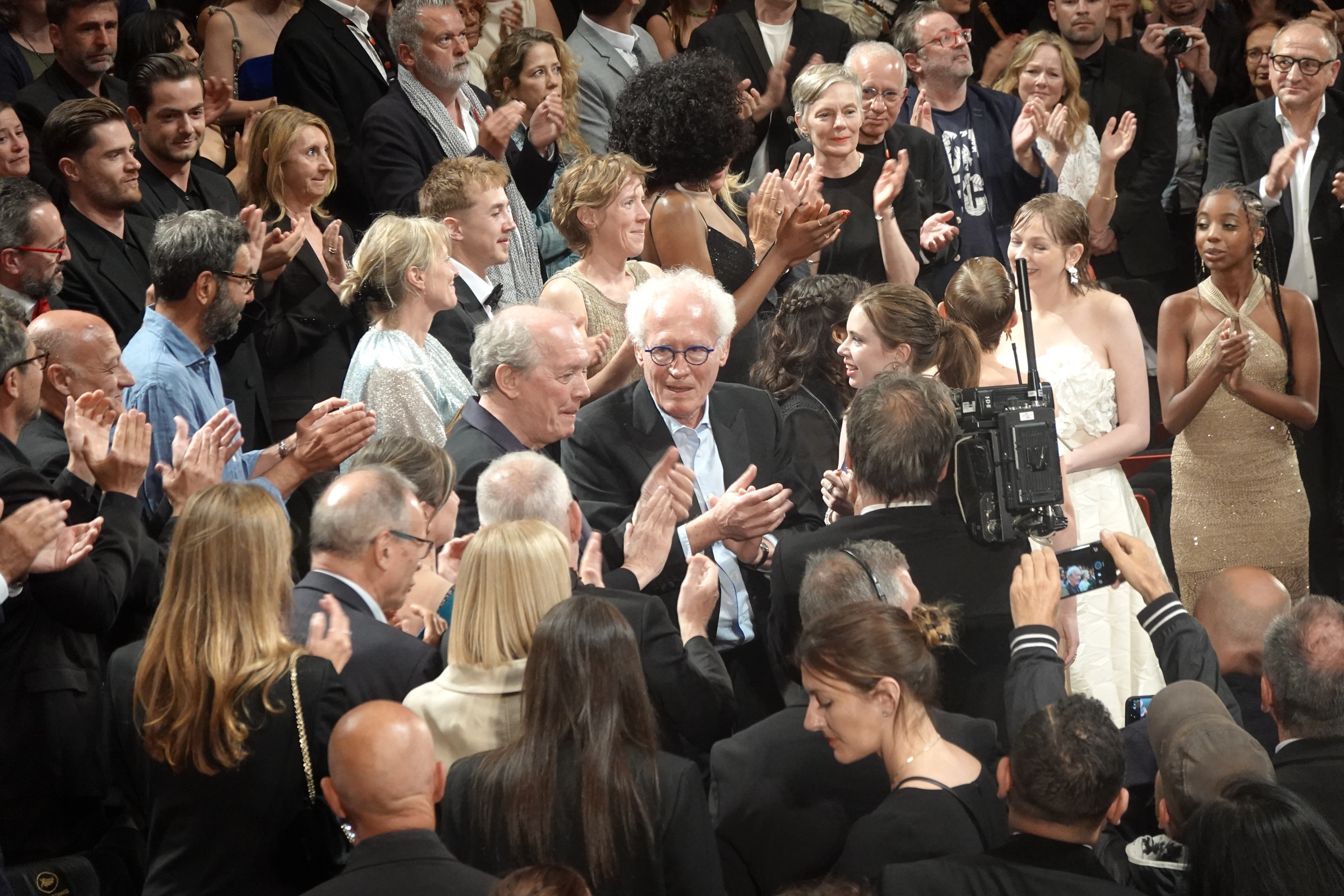
Dardenne Brothers and cast during the film's premiere

Young Mothers was selected to have its world premiere in the main competition of the 2025 Cannes Film Festival, where it was nominated for the Palme d'Or. After its screening, on 23 May 2025, the film received a 10 minutes standing ovation. It was awarded the Best Screenplay prize, alongside the Prize of the Ecumenical Jury. It was also showcased at the 53rd Norwegian International Film Festival in Main Programme section on 17 August 2025. It will also be presented in the Icon section at the 30th Busan International Film Festival in September 2025, and in the Official Section of the 70th Valladolid International Film Festival.

== Accolades ==
Award	Date of ceremony	Category	Recipient(s)	Result	Ref.
Belgian Film Critics Association	17 December 2025	Best Film	Young Mothers	Won	
Cannes Film Festival	24 May 2025	Palme d'Or	Young Mothers	Nominated	
Cannes Film Festival	24 May 2025	Best Screenplay	Jean-Pierre and Luc Dardenne	Won	
Cannes Film Festival	24 May 2025	Prix du Jury Œcuménique	Young Mothers	Won	

== See also ==
- List of submissions to the 98th Academy Awards for Best International Feature Film
- List of Belgian submissions for the Academy Award for Best International Feature Film
