= Mexico 86 (film) =

2024 film directed by César Díaz

- Directed by: César Díaz
- Produced by: Delphine Schmit; Géraldine Sprimont; Anne-Laure Guégan
- Starring: Bérénice Béjo
- Cinematography: Virginie Surdej
- Edited by: Alain Dessauvage
- Music by: Rémi Boubal
- Production companies: Need Productions; Tripode Productions; Pimienta Films; Menuetto Film
- Release date: August 10, 2024 (Locarno)
- Running time: 89 minutes
- Language: Spanish

Mexico 86 is a 2024 drama film directed by César Díaz, and starring Bérénice Béjo as a Guatemalan rebel activist reunited with her son ten years after leaving the country.

== Premise ==
Amidst the backdrop of the Guatemalan Civil War, death threats force the rebel activist Maria to flee the country in 1976. Ten years later, her son joins her in her new home in Mexico, and she struggles to balance her family life with her activism.

== Cast ==
- Bérénice Béjo as Maria
- Matheo Labbé as Marco
- Leonardo Ortizgris
- Julieta Egurrola

== Production ==
Principal photography occurred between August and October 2023 in Mexico and Guatemala.

== Release ==
In February 2024, Goodfellas acquired international sales for Mexico 86 for a world premiere in the Piazza Grande section of the 77th Locarno Film Festival on 10 August 2024.

== Reception ==
A review at Cineuropa praised Béjo’s performance, stating, "Perfectly at ease in the role of a stubborn woman who finds herself trapped against her will in a dual fight against both her enemies and her allies, Bejo lends convincing consistency to this complex character, whose intentions and motivations become clearer as the story advances and make us reflect upon our own prejudices."

A reive at Loud and Clear found, "Nevertheless, Mexico 86 is tense, nerve-jangling, and, above all else, quietly horrifying. For this accurate representation of a long period of such intense political violence and repression, it can only be praised.” Another review stated, ”Diaz manages to keep the balance between continuing on the path of his first film (part of his crew was the same, for instance, for cinematography and music), and progressing to a whole other level in terms of means and ambitions – a fact embodied by the casting of Bérénice Béjo for the main role. Mexico 86 navigates, with equal success, between sharp action sequences typical of the spy genre (a car chase in the city streets, a sudden assassination in plain sight, shot in one continuous take), and tender scenes taking place inside the family circle.”
