= The Room (2019 film) =

Film by Christian Volckman

- Theatrical release poster
- Directed by: Christian Volckman
- Written by: Christian Volckman; Eric Forestier
- Produced by: Yaël Fogiel; Laetitia Gonzalez; Jacques-Henri Bronckart; Gwennaëlle Libert; Lilian Eche; Christel Henon
- Starring: Olga Kurylenko; Kevin Janssens; Joshua Wilson; John Flanders; Francis Chapman
- Cinematography: Reynald Capurro
- Edited by: Sophie Fourdrinoy
- Music by: Raf Keunen
- Production companies: Les Films du Poisson; Versus Production; Bidibul Productions
- Distributed by: O'Brother Distribution
- Release dates: 15 April 2019 (BIFFF); 6 November 2019 (Belgium); 6 May 2020 (France)
- Running time: 100 minutes
- Countries: France; Belgium; Luxembourg
- Language: English

The Room is a 2019 English-language thriller film co-written and directed by Christian Volckman and starring Olga Kurylenko, Kevin Janssens, Joshua Wilson, John Flanders, and Francis Chapman. The film follows a young couple who discover a way to fulfill all of their material desires, but then go too far. It premiered on 15 April 2019 at the Brussels International Fantastic Film Festival.

== Plot ==
Matt and Kate, a young couple, move to Upstate New York, having purchased a home. While renovating, they discover a large, hidden room. Additionally, the electricity in the house occasionally surges, causing lights to flicker. The couple also learns that a murder occurred on the property, decades before.

Matt learns that the killer is a "John Doe" and that he is still alive and in a psychiatric hospital. He also inadvertently discovers that The Room can grant wishes. He tells Kate, and both quit their jobs with The Room providing everything they desire.

Realizing that nothing they wish for has any real value, Kate falls into a depression. To cheer her up, Matt tells her he wants to try to have a baby, but she becomes angry, reminding him of two previous miscarriages. She says she can't put herself through that pain again and storms out of the room, but ends up using the Room to create a baby, Shane. Matt wants her to use the Room to uncreate the baby, but neither she nor Matt is actually able to bring themselves to do so.

Later, Matt goes to visit "John Doe" at the hospital. John warns Matt, insisting that he and Kate should leave the house and forget The Room. Matt discovers that Room-created items age and turn to dust when taken beyond the confines of the house. Kate tells Matt she is taking the baby out for some fresh air. He tries to dissuade her, but ultimately chooses not to stop her. Once the baby is outdoors, he ages to a young child in seconds. Kate screams for Matt, who runs outside and takes Shane back inside the house.

The couple's marriage deteriorates as Kate attempts to parent Shane, while Matt ignores him. Shane grows impatient and bored since Kate will not allow him to leave the house, telling him that he is sick and that there are germs outside. Soon Shane discovers The Room and creates an outdoor area inside it, causing an argument between the parents. "John Doe" calls the home and reveals to Matt that he was a child-wish granted by The Room and is able to exist outside of the house because of his parents' deaths, allowing him to become part of the real world. He tells Matt that if Kate dies, Shane will be able to live outside the house. Kate overhears the conversation and attempts to crash her car, but cannot bring herself to do so. When she returns, the couple reunites and have sex, unknowingly watched by Shane.

The next morning, they discover that Shane has gone outside and aged himself into a teenager, though he still has the mind of a child and is angry with Kate for lying to him about the germs. This causes an altercation, and Kate and Matt are knocked out. Shane uses the Room to enlarge the outdoor area and duplicate the house inside it. He shapeshifts into Matt and kidnaps Kate, taking her to the cloned home.

A short time later, Matt awakens and searches for Kate. He discovers the cloned house and breaks in as Shane attempts to rape Kate. Kate pushes Shane down the stairs, and she and Matt try to escape, but they realize Shane used The Room to create a labyrinth inside the cloned home. Shane finds them in the house and stabs and kills Matt, but realizes that Matt and Kate have used the Room to replicate themselves and that the real Matt and Kate have escaped. Ultimately, they trick Shane into going outside, where he rapidly ages and dies, deteriorating into a pile of dust.

A month later, the couple has abandoned the home and is living in a motel. Kate stares in shock at a positive pregnancy test, and the hotel lights flicker, indicating that they may have not truly escaped the room/house.

== Cast ==
- Olga Kurylenko as Kate
- Kevin Janssens as Matt
- Joshua Wilson as Shane (child)
- John Flanders as John Doe
- Francis Chapman as Shane (teenager)
- Vince Drews as Chet
- Marianne Bourg as Suzanne
- Oscar Lesage as Henry
- Carole Weyers as Mrs. Schaeffer
- Michaël Kahya as Mr. Schaeffer

== Release ==
In 2019, the film was officially selected for Hof International Film Festival (Germany), Sitges International Film Festival of Catalonia (Spain), and Bucheon International Fantastic Film Festival (South Korea), European Fantastic Film Festival (France), Brussels International Fantastic Film Festival (Belgium), Neuchâtel International Fantastic Film Festival (Switzerland), Ostend Film Festival (Belgium).

== Reception ==
The Room received mixed to positive reviews from critics. On Rotten Tomatoes, the film holds an approval rating of 71% based on 14 reviews, with an average rating of 5.8/10.
