= Julian (2025 film) =

2025 Belgian-Dutch drama film

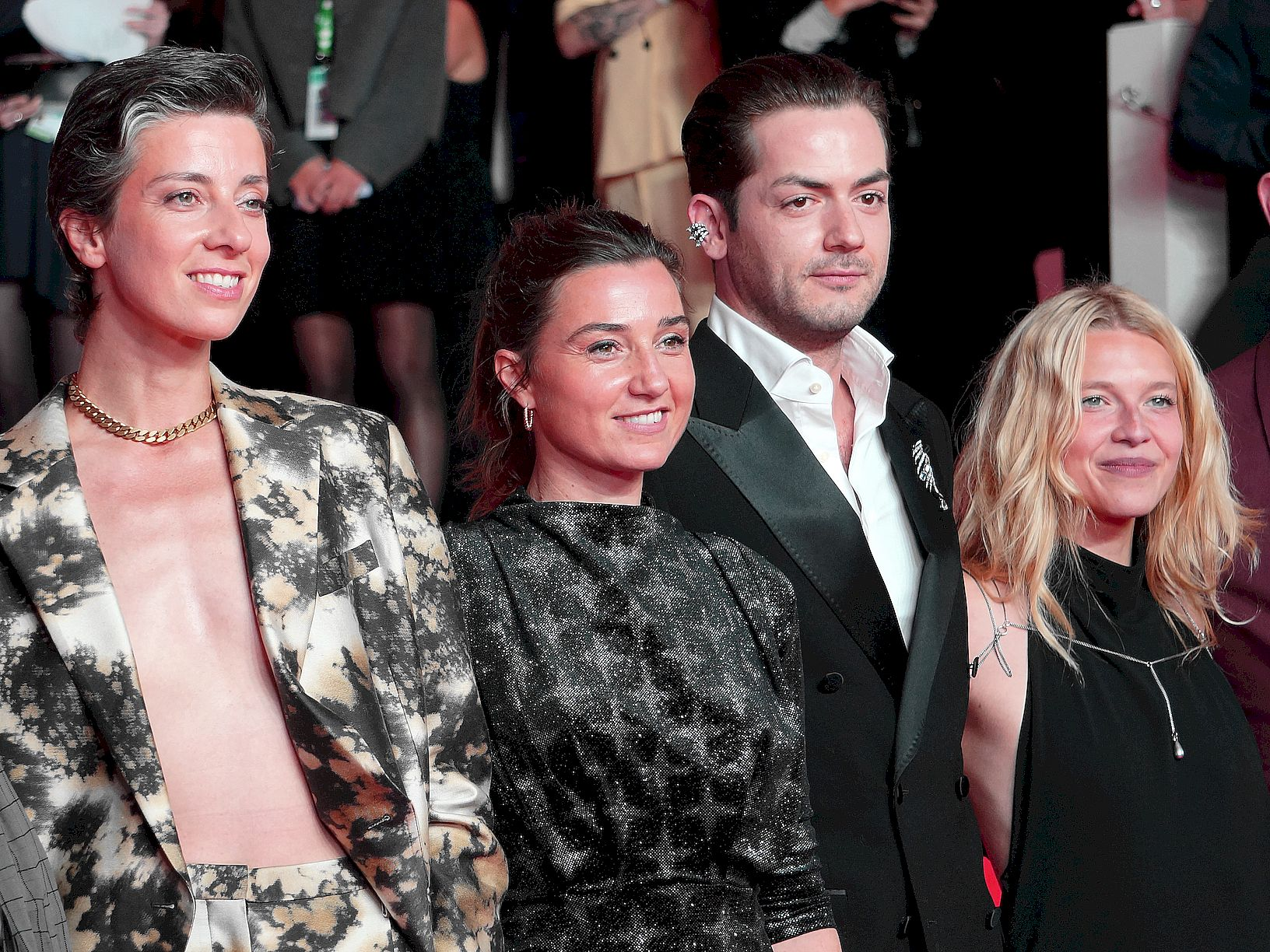
- Film cast at 2025 Film Fest Gent
- Directed by: Cato Kusters
- Written by: Cato Kusters; Angelo Tijssens
- Based on: Julian by Fleur Pierets
- Produced by: Lukas Dhont; Michiel Dhont
- Starring: Nina Meurisse; Laurence Roothooft
- Cinematography: Michel Rosendaal
- Edited by: Lot Rossmark
- Music by: Evgueni Galperine; Sacha Galperine
- Production companies: The Reunion; Les Films du Fleuve; Topkapi Films; Madhouse Films
- Distributed by: Lumiere Distribution
- Release dates: 6 September 2025 (TIFF); 11 December 2025 (Netherlands)
- Running time: 91 minutes
- Countries: Belgium; Netherlands
- Languages: English; French; Dutch
- Box office: $33,198

Julian is a 2025 Belgian-Dutch drama film, directed by Cato Kusters. Adapted from the book by Belgian artist Fleur Pierets, the film stars Nina Meurisse and Laurence Roothooft as Fleur and Julian, two women who fall in love and embark on a plan to travel around the world having a wedding ceremony in every single country where same-sex marriage is legal.

The film premiered in the Discovery program at the 2025 Toronto International Film Festival on September 6, 2025.

== Cast ==
- Nina Meurisse as Fleur Pierets
- Laurence Roothooft as Julian
- Rosalia Cuevas as Ingrid
- Peter Seynaeve as Edward
- Zach Hatch as Chris
- Jennifer Heylen as Imani
