= Golden Ibis Award =

Prestigious award for outstanding achievements in filmmaking

- Awarded for: Excellence in cinematic achievements
- Country: France
- First award: 2014
- Website: festival-labaule.com

The Golden Ibis Award is an accolade presented annually to recognize excellence of professionals in the film industry, including directors, actors, writers and composers. The award was established by Christophe Barratier and Sam Bambino in 2014. Historically given during the last quarter of the year at the La Baule Film Festival, the awards honor achievements for cinematic accomplishments for the preceding year.

The various category winners are awarded a copy of a statuette, which was created by artist Joëlle Bellet.

== Categories ==
The Golden Ibis Award consists of seven merit awards for films from the previous year, as well as honorary awards for lifetime achievement.

Merit awards

- Best Film
- Best Screenplay
- Best Actor
- Best Actress
- Best Original Score
- Best Short Film
- Breakthrough Performance

Special awards

- Honorary Award
- Tribute Award
- Talent Award
- Audience Award
