= Lukas Dhont =

Belgian film director and screenwriter (born 1991)

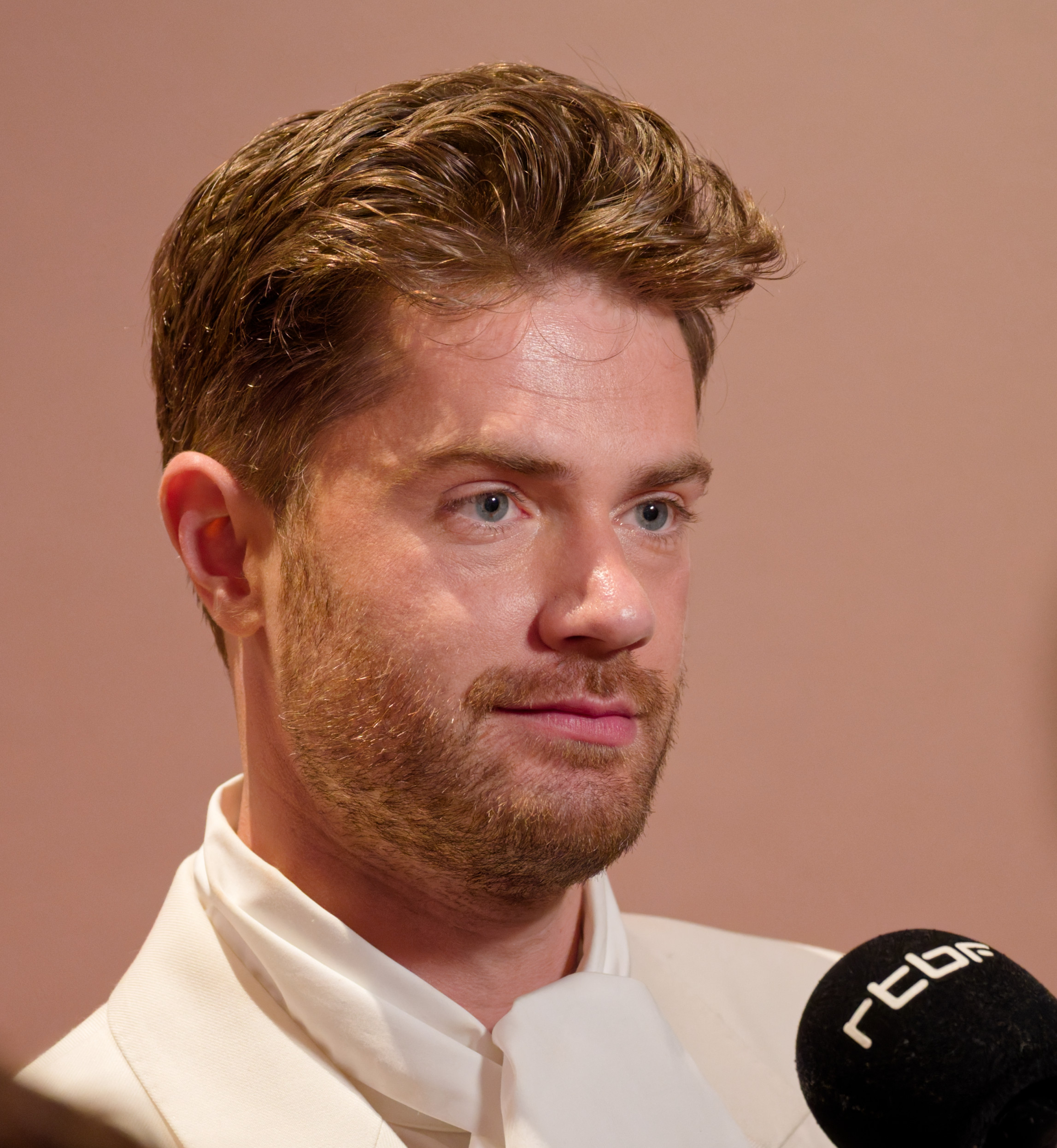
- Dhont in 2026
- Born: 11 June 1991 (age 35); Ghent, Belgium
- Occupations: Director; screenwriter
- Years active: 2012–present
- Awards: Full list

Lukas Dhont (Dutch: [ˈlukɑz ˈdɔnt]; born 11 June 1991) is a Belgian filmmaker. His films usually explore queer experiences in Belgian society. His debut feature film Girl (2018) won the Caméra d'Or and the Queer Palm at 71st Cannes Film Festival.

His second feature film Close (2022) won the Grand Prix at the 75th Cannes Film Festival, and was nominated for the Academy Award for Best International Feature Film representing Belgium.

== Early life ==
Dhont was born in Ghent, Belgium. He attended a Catholic high school. As a teenager, Dhont worked as a costume design assistant on film and television sets.

His mother is a fashion teacher at an art school. He has a younger brother, Michiel, who is two years younger and works as a producer. Lukas and Michiel both identify as gay.

== Career ==
Dhont made his feature-length debut in 2018 with Girl, a coming-of-age drama film centered on a trans girl pursuing a career as a ballerina. Girl was inspired by the story of Nora Monsecour, whom Dhont met when he was 18. The film premiered at the 2018 Cannes Film Festival, where it won the Caméra d'Or award for best first feature film, as well as the Queer Palm. It was nominated for the Golden Globe Award for Best Non-English Language Film. It received the André Cavens Award presented by the Belgian Film Critics Association and was selected as the Belgian entry for Best Foreign Language Film at the 91st Academy Awards. It received nine nominations at the 9th Magritte Awards and won four, including Best Flemish Film and Best Screenplay for Dhont.

In 2019, Dhont was featured in Forbes 30 Under 30 Europe list.

Dhont's follow-up feature, Close, premiered in competition at the 2022 Cannes Film Festival, where it shared the Grand Prix with Claire Denis' Stars At Noon. It also won the Sydney Film Prize at the 69th Sydney Film Festival. The film is based on his own experiences at school, and tells the story of a friendship between two boys in their early teens. It was named Best International Film of 2022 by the National Board of Review. In 2023, the film was nominated for Best International Feature Film at the 95th Academy Awards.

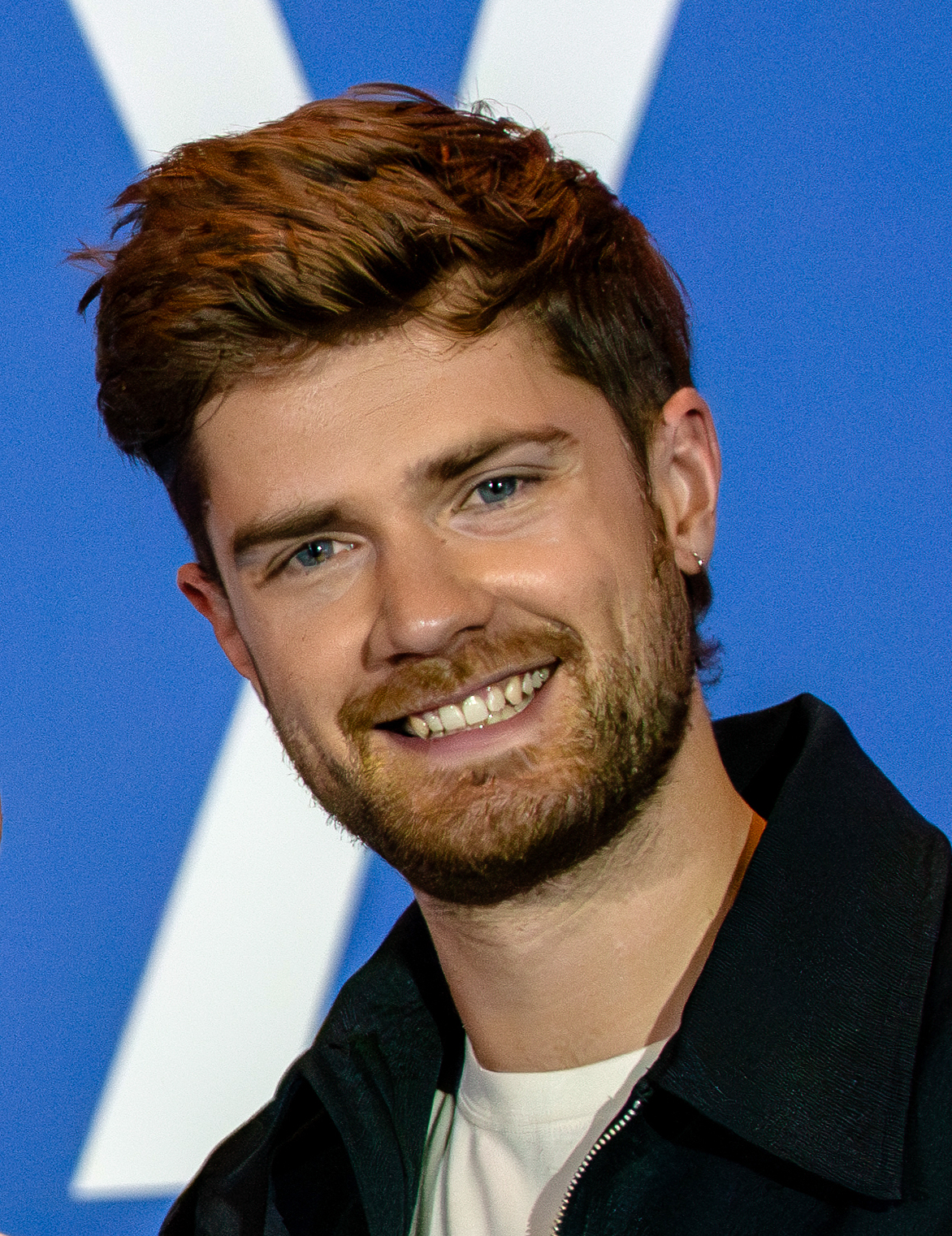
Dhont in 2023

In June 2023, Dhont was invited to join the Academy of Motion Picture Arts and Sciences. In 2024, Dhont presided over the Queer Palm jury for the 2024 Cannes Film Festival. In 2025, Dhont co-produced, with Michiel, the Belgian-Dutch drama film Julian, which premiered in the Discovery programme at the 2025 Toronto International Film Festival. Dhont's third feature film, Coward, is a World War I–set drama about a young Belgian soldier who discovers love and art while questioning traditional notions of heroism and cowardice. The screenplay was developed over approximately three years with co-writer Angelo Tijssens, drawing on historical research conducted in archives in London, Belgium, and France. In April 2026, it had its world premiere in the main competition at the 2026 Cannes Film Festival, where it will compete for the Palme d'Or.

== Filmography ==
=== Feature films ===
Year	Title	Credited as			Notes
Year	Title	Director	Screenwriter	Producer	Notes
2018	Girl	Yes	Yes	No	Caméra d'Or winner at the 2018 Cannes Film Festival
2022	Close	Yes	Yes	No	Grand Prix winner at the 2022 Cannes Film Festival; National Board of Review Award for Best International Film
2025	Julian	No	No	Yes	
2026	Coward	Yes	Yes	No	

=== Short films ===
Year	Title	Credited as				Ref.
Year	Title	Director	Screenwriter	Cinematographer	Producer	Ref.
2012	Headlong	Yes	Yes	No	No	
2012	De Lucht in mijn Keel	No	Yes	No	No	
2012	Skin of Glass	Yes	No	Yes	No	
2014	L'Infini	Yes	Yes	No	No	
2021	Our Nature	Yes	Yes	No	No	
2023	Gun	No	No	No	Yes	
