= Public Enemy (TV series) =

Belgian television series

- French: Ennemi Public
- Genre: Crime drama; Thriller
- Created by: Antoine Bours; Gilles de Voghel; Matthieu Frances; Christopher Yates; Fred Castadot
- Written by: Antoine Bours; Fred Castadot; Gilles de Voghel; Matthieu Frances; Christopher Yates
- Directed by: Matthieu Frances; Gary Seghers
- Starring: Stéphanie Blanchoud; Clément Manuel; Jean-Jacques Rausin; Philippe Jeusette; Angelo Bison
- Country of origin: Belgium
- Original language: French
- No. of series: 3
- No. of episodes: 26

Production
- Executive producer: Matthieu Frances (showrunner)
- Production companies: Playtime Films; Entre Chien et Loup; RTBF; Proximus

Original release
- Network: La Une
- Release: 1 May 2016 – present

Public Enemy (French: Ennemi Public) is a Belgian French-language crime thriller based loosely on the Marc Dutroux case. The first season of 10 episodes aired on La Une in Belgium from 1 May to 29 May 2016, and the second season, also of 10 episodes, aired from 10 March 2019 to 14 April 2019.

== Synopsis ==
A child murderer released on parole, Guy Béranger is welcomed by the monks of the abbey of Vielsart, a quiet little village in the Ardennes. He is placed under the protection of Chloé Muller, a young federal police inspector, convinced that, sooner or later, the former criminal will reoffend. While the population is indignant at the presence of Public Enemy No. 1 in their neighbourhood, the police learn of the disturbing disappearance of a young girl from the village ...

== Cast and characters ==
- Stéphanie Blanchoud as Chloe Muller
- Jean-Jacques Rausin as Michaël Charlier
- Clément Manuel as Lucas Stassart
- Angelo Bison as Guy Béranger
- Philippe Jeusette as Patrick Stassart
- Laura Sepul as Judith Stassart
- Vincent Londez as Vincent Stassart
- Eric Godon as Etienne Gomez
- Pauline Étienne as Jessica Muller (series 2–3)
- Eduardo Aladro as Frère Eduardo

== Episodes ==
Series	Episodes	Originally released	
Series	Episodes	First released	Last released
1	10	1 May 2016	30 May 2016
2	10	10 March 2019	14 April 2019
3	6	12 March 2023	26 March 2023

=== Season 1 (2017) ===
Series no.	Season no.	Title	Original Belgian air date	Original French air date	French viewers (millions)
1	1	"The Lost Sheep" "La brebis égarée"	1 May 2016	6 February 2017	4.20
2	2	"The Sign of the Beast" "La marque de la bête"	1 May 2016	6 February 2017	4.20
3	3	"False Idols" "Les fausses idoles"	9 May 2016	13 February 2017	3.28
4	4	"The Good Shepherd" "Le bon berger"	9 May 2016	13 February 2017	3.28
5	5	"Blood Brothers" "Frères de sang"	15 May 2016	20 February 2017	3.29
6	6	"The Alliance" "L'alliance"	15 May 2016	20 February 2017	3.29
7	7	"The Well of Souls" "Le puit des âmes"	23 May 2016	20 February 2017	3.29
8	8	"Agnus Dei" "Agnus Dei"	23 May 2016	27 February 2017	3.09
9	9	"Thou Shall Not Kill" "Tu ne tueras point"	30 May 2016	27 February 2017	3.09
10	10	"The Last Judgment" "Le jugement dernier"	30 May 2016	27 February 2017	3.09

=== Season 2 (2019) ===
Series no.	Season no.	Title	Original air date
11	1	"Brothers and Sisters" "Frères et soeurs"	10 March 2019
12	2	"The Debt" "La dette"	10 March 2019
13	3	"The Mystery of Faith" "Le mystère de la foi"	17 March 2019
14	4	"Resurrection" "La résurrection"	17 March 2019
15	5	"A Perfect World" "Un monde parfait"	29 March 2019
16	6	"The False Prophets" "Les faux prophètes"	29 March 2019
17	7	"A Sheep Among Wolves" "Une brebis au milieu des loups"	7 April 2019
18	8	"Honour Thy Father and Thy Mother" "Tu honoreras ton père et ta mère"	7 April 2019
19	9	"The Massacre of The Innocent" "Le massacre des innocents"	14 April 2019
20	10	"Exodus" "L'exode"	14 April 2019

=== Season 3 (2023) ===
No. overall	No. in season	Title	Original release date
21	1	"Le droit chemin"	12 March 2023
22	2	"Le péché originel"	12 March 2023
23	3	"Délivrez-nous du mal"	19 March 2023
24	4	"La terre promise"	19 March 2023
25	5	"Excommunication"	26 March 2023
26	6	"La bête (Final)"	26 March 2023

== Broadcast ==
In Belgium, the series first aired on La Une from 1 May to 29 May 2016, where it was watched by an average of 388,000 viewers per episode. It was broadcast again on Canvas from 4 February 2017.

=== International ===
In France, the series aired on TF1 from 6 February to 27 February 2017. The series also premiered in Germany on 24 November 2016 on Sky Deutschland, in Australia on 15 December on SBS On Demand and in the UK on 10 May 2017 on Sky Atlantic. The series was also sold to Movistar Series Xtra and VOD in Spain; Ale Kino+ in Poland and C More Entertainment in Sweden, Norway, Finland and Denmark., in Croatia, Bosnia and Herzegovina, Serbia, Montenegro, Slovenia and Macedonia series premiered on Pickbox VOD.

== Reception ==
=== Critical response ===
The series received critical acclaim in Belgium. In the UK, The Times's Chris Bennion gave the series four stars out of five, calling it a "decidedly elegant thriller". The Radio Times's Alison Graham described the series as a "workmanlike and actually not-bad thriller, even if there are no surprises".

=== Accolades ===
The series won the Buyers' Choice "Coup de Coeur" Award at the MIPTV event in Cannes. Angelo Bison was named the Best Actor in a French-Language Series at the 2016 Series Mania festival. The series also received an honourable mention at the 2016 Prix Europa in Berlin.

== Notes ==
1.This refers to the original date of broadcast on La Une.
2.This refers to the original date of broadcast on TF1.
