= Kika (2025 film) =

2025 film by Alexe Poukine

- Theatrical release poster
- Directed by: Alexe Poukine
- Written by: Alexe Poukine; Thomas Van Zuylen
- Produced by: Benoït Roland; Alexandre Perrier; François-Pierre Clavel
- Starring: Manon Clavel
- Cinematography: Colin Lévêque
- Edited by: Agnès Brückert
- Music by: Pierre Desprats
- Production companies: Wrong Men; Kidam
- Distributed by: Imagine Films (Belgium); Condor Distribution (France)
- Release dates: 16 May 2025 (Cannes); 25 June 2025 (Belgium)
- Running time: 110 minutes
- Countries: Belgium; France
- Language: French

Kika is a 2025 drama film directed by Alexe Poukine from a screenplay she co-wrote with Thomas Van Zuylen. It is her narrative feature directorial debut. The film stars Manon Clavel in the title role. It is a co-production of France and Belgium.

The film had its world premiere at the Critics' Week section of the 2025 Cannes Film Festival on 16 May 2025, and was theatrically released in Belgium on 25 June 2025 by Imagine Films. At the 2025 René Awards, it received eight nominations, including Best First Feature Film and Best Director for Poukine.

== Premise ==
A woman discovers she is pregnant with her second child while facing the death of her partner.

== Cast ==
- Manon Clavel as Kika
- Ethelle Gonzalez Lardued
- Makita Samba
- Suzanne Elbaz
- Anaël Snoek
- Thomas Coumans
- Kadija Leclere
- Bernard Blancan

== Production ==
In July 2024, it was reported that the project received support from Belgian investment fund screen.brussels. Principal photography began on 15 September and concluded on 5 November 2024 in Brussels, Belgium.

== Release ==
Kika had its world premiere at the 2025 Cannes Film Festival on 16 May 2025 in the Critics' Week section. Prior to the premiere, Totem Films acquired the film's international sales. It was theatrically released in Belgium on 25 June 2025 by Imagine Films. It will be distributed in French cinemas by Condor Distribution, with a release on 12 November 2025.
