= Alexe Poukine =

French film director (born 1982)

- Born: 1982 (age 43–44)
- Occupations: film director, screenwriter, actress

Alexe Poukine (born 1982) is a French-born, Belgium-based film director, photographer, screenwriter, and actress.

After high school, she moved to New Zealand where studied photography at the Beaux-Arts School. At the age of 20, Poukine returned to France and started taking drama lessons, as well as studying Anthropology and Arabic. In 2006, she went to Jordan and filmed there a documentary, Petites morts.

In 2011, her photographic project Un bouquet de houx vert et de bruyère en fleur was presented as an exhibition and a book of the same title.

Her next project, a documentary Dormir, dormir dans les pierres, told a story of two homeless men. Released in 2013, it received the main prize at the Escales Documentaires and the Prix Regard social at Traces de Vies in Clermont-Ferrand. The film was also bought by the French national TV.

In 2013, she enrolled in the Atelier Scenario of La Fémis in Paris to study screenwriting.

In 2019, she released Sans frapper (That Which Does Not Kill), a feature-length documentary on rapes and its victims. The film won the Jury Prize at the Visions du Réel.

In 2021, she released her first fiction, Palma, a medium-length self-fiction movie.

Her upcoming project, Who Cares?, is scheduled for release in 2024.

== Filmography ==
- 2008 – Petites morts (doc)
- 2013 – Dormir, dormir dans les pierres (doc)
- 2019 – Sans frapper/That Which Does Not Kill (doc)
- 2021 – Palma (short)
- 2024 – Who Cares?
- 2025 – Kika
