= 6th Magritte Awards =

2016 Belgian film awards ceremony

- Official poster
- Date: February 6, 2016
- Site: Square; Mont des Arts, Brussels, Belgium
- Hosted by: Charlie Dupont
- Produced by: José Bouquiaux
- Directed by: Vincent J. Gustin

Highlights
- Best Film: The Brand New Testament
- Most awards: The Brand New Testament and Alleluia (4)
- Most nominations: The Brand New Testament (10)

Television coverage
- Network: BeTV

The 6th Magritte Awards ceremony, presented by the Académie André Delvaux, honored the best films of 2015 in Belgium and took place on February 6, 2016, at the Square in the historic site of Mont des Arts, Brussels beginning at 8:00 p.m. CET. During the ceremony, the Académie André Delvaux presented Magritte Awards in 22 categories. The ceremony was televised in Belgium by BeTV. Actress Marie Gillain presided the ceremony, while Charlie Dupont hosted the show for the second time.

The nominees for the 6th Magritte Awards were announced on January 12, 2016. Films with the most nominations were The Brand New Testament with ten, followed by All Cats Are Grey with nine and Alleluia with eight. The winners were announced during the awards ceremony on February 6, 2016. The Brand New Testament won four awards, including Best Film and Best Director for Jaco Van Dormael. Other multiple winners were Alleluia also with four awards, and All Cats Are Grey with two.

== Winners and nominees ==
=== Best Film ===
- The Brand New Testament (Le Tout Nouveau Testament)
  - All Cats Are Grey (Tous les chats sont gris)
  - I'm Dead But I Have Friends (Je suis mort mais j'ai des amis)
  - Melody
  - Prejudice

=== Best Director ===
- Jaco Van Dormael – The Brand New Testament (Le Tout Nouveau Testament)
  - Bernard Bellefroid – Melody
  - Savina Dellicour – All Cats Are Grey (Tous les chats sont gris)
  - Fabrice Du Welz – Alleluia

=== Best Actor ===
- Wim Willaert – I'm Dead But I Have Friends (Je suis mort mais j'ai des amis)
  - François Damiens – La Famille Bélier
  - Bouli Lanners – All Cats Are Grey (Tous les chats sont gris)
  - Jérémie Renier – The Wakhan Front (Ni le ciel ni la terre)

=== Best Actress ===
- Veerle Baetens – Un début prometteur
  - Annie Cordy – Memories (Les Souvenirs)
  - Christelle Cornil – What Jacques Saw (Jacques a vu)
  - Yolande Moreau – Journey Through China (Voyage en Chine)

=== Best Supporting Actor ===
- Laurent Capelluto – The Clearstream Affair (L'Enquête)
  - Arno Hintjens – Prejudice
  - David Murgia – The Brand New Testament (Le Tout Nouveau Testament)
  - Marc Zinga – Dheepan

=== Best Supporting Actress ===
- Anne Coesens – All Cats Are Grey (Tous les chats sont gris)
  - Yolande Moreau – The Brand New Testament (Le Tout Nouveau Testament)
  - Helena Noguerra – Alleluia
  - Babetida Sadjo – Waste Land

=== Most Promising Actor ===
- Benjamin Ramon – Être
  - Arthur Bols – Prejudice
  - Romain Gelin – The Brand New Testament (Le Tout Nouveau Testament)
  - David Thielemans – Chubby (Bouboule)

=== Most Promising Actress ===
- Lucie Debay – Melody
  - Manon Capelle – All Cats Are Grey (Tous les chats sont gris)
  - Pili Groyne – The Brand New Testament (Le Tout Nouveau Testament)
  - Stéphanie Van Vyve – Être

=== Best Screenplay ===
- The Brand New Testament (Le Tout Nouveau Testament) – Thomas Gunzig and Jaco Van Dormael
  - Alleluia – Fabrice Du Welz and Vincent Tavier
  - I'm Dead But I Have Friends (Je suis mort mais j'ai des amis) – Guillaume Malandrin and Stéphane Malandrin
  - Prejudice – Antoine Cuypers and Antoine Wauters

=== Best First Feature Film ===
- All Cats Are Grey (Tous les chats sont gris)
  - Next Year (L'Année prochaine)
  - Prejudice

=== Best Flemish Film ===
- The Ardennes (D'Ardennen)
  - Belgian Rhapsody (Brabançonne)
  - Cafard
  - Waste Land

=== Best Foreign Film in Coproduction ===
- La Famille Bélier
  - Marguerite
  - Song of the Sea
  - The Wakhan Front (Ni le ciel ni la terre)

=== Best Cinematography ===
- Alleluia – Manuel Dacosse
  - The Brand New Testament (Le Tout Nouveau Testament) – Christophe Beaucarne
  - Prejudice – Frédéric Noirhomme

=== Best Production Design ===
- Alleluia – Emmanuel de Meulemeester
  - All Cats Are Grey (Tous les chats sont gris) – Paul Rouschop
  - I'm Dead But I Have Friends (Je suis mort mais j'ai des amis) – Eve Martin

=== Best Costume Design ===
- The Lady in the Car with Glasses and a Gun (La Dame dans l'auto avec des lunettes et un fusil) – Pascaline Chavanne
  - All Cats Are Grey (Tous les chats sont gris) – Sabine Zappitelli
  - I'm Dead But I Have Friends (Je suis mort mais j'ai des amis) – Elise Ancion

=== Best Original Score ===
- The Brand New Testament (Le Tout Nouveau Testament) – An Pierlé
  - Alleluia – Vincent Cahay
  - Melody – Frédéric Vercheval

=== Best Sound ===
- Alleluia – Emmanuel de Boissieu, Frédéric Meert, and Ludovic Van Pachterbeke
  - The Brand New Testament (Le Tout Nouveau Testament) – François Dumont, Michel Schillings, and Dominique Warnier
  - I'm Dead But I Have Friends (Je suis mort mais j'ai des amis) – Marc Bastien, Marc Engels, and Franco Piscopo

=== Best Editing ===
- Alleluia – Anne-Laure Guégan
  - All Cats Are Grey (Tous les chats sont gris) – Ewin Ryckaert
  - I'm Dead But I Have Friends (Je suis mort mais j'ai des amis) – Yannick Leroy

=== Best Fiction Short Film ===
- The Black Bear (L'Ours noir)
  - Jay Amongst Men (Jay parmi les hommes)
  - Tout va bien

=== Best Animated Short Film ===
- Last Door South (Dernière porte au Sud)
  - The Scent of Carrots (Le Parfum de la carotte)
  - A Slice of the Country (Tranche de campagne)

=== Best Documentary Film ===
- The Man Who Mends Women: The Wrath of Hippocrates (L'Homme qui répare les femmes: la colère d'Hippocrate)
  - Employment Office (Bureau de chômage)
  - I Don't Belong Anywhere: The Cinema of Chantal Akerman
  - Ship of Fools (La Nef des fous)

=== Honorary Magritte Award ===
- Vincent Lindon

== Films with multiple nominations and awards ==
The following twelve films received multiple nominations.

- Ten: The Brand New Testament
- Nine: All Cats Are Grey
- Eight: Alleluia
- Seven: I'm Dead But I Have Friends
- Six: Prejudice
- Four: Melody
- Two: Être, La Famille Bélier, The Wakhan Front, and Waste Land

The following three films received multiple awards.

- Four: The Brand New Testament and Alleluia
- Two: All Cats Are Grey

== See also ==
- 41st César Awards
- 21st Lumières Awards
- 2015 in film
