= Maldoror (film) =

2024 film by Fabrice Du Welz

- Poster
- Directed by: Fabrice Du Welz
- Written by: Fabrice Du Welz; Domenico La Porta
- Produced by: Violaine Barbaroux; Manuel Chiche; Jean-Yves Roubin
- Starring: Anthony Bajon; Alba Gaïa Bellugi; Alexis Manenti; Sergi López
- Cinematography: Manu Dacosse
- Edited by: Nico Leunen
- Music by: Vincent Cahay
- Production companies: Frakas Productions; Spade (for The Jokers Films); RTBF; VOO; BE TV; Shelter Prod; France 2 Cinéma
- Distributed by: O'Brother Film (Belgium); The Jokers Films (France)
- Release dates: 3 September 2024 (Venice); 15 January 2025 (France); 22 January 2025 (Belgium)
- Running time: 155 minutes
- Countries: Belgium; France
- Languages: French; Sicilian
- Budget: €8.5 million
- Box office: $500,000

Maldoror is a 2024 crime thriller film co-written and directed by Fabrice Du Welz. Inspired by the judicial scandal surrounding Belgian serial killer and child molester Marc Dutroux, Maldoror stars Anthony Bajon as a young policeman who becomes obsessed with a case involving a notorious child abuser. Alba Gaïa Bellugi, Alexis Manenti and Sergi López star in the supporting roles. The film is a co-production between Belgium and France.

The film premiered on 3 September 2024 at the 81st Venice International Film Festival. It was theatrically released in France on 15 January 2025, and in Belgium on 22 January 2025.

== Plot ==
Following the disappearance of two girls, the impulsive young Belgian Gendarmerie officer Paul Chartier is assigned to the secret unit "Maldoror" to monitor a dangerous sex offender. When the operation is undone by the dysfunctional police and legal system, a frustrated and obsessed Chartier takes the hunt for the perpetrator into his own hands.

== Cast ==
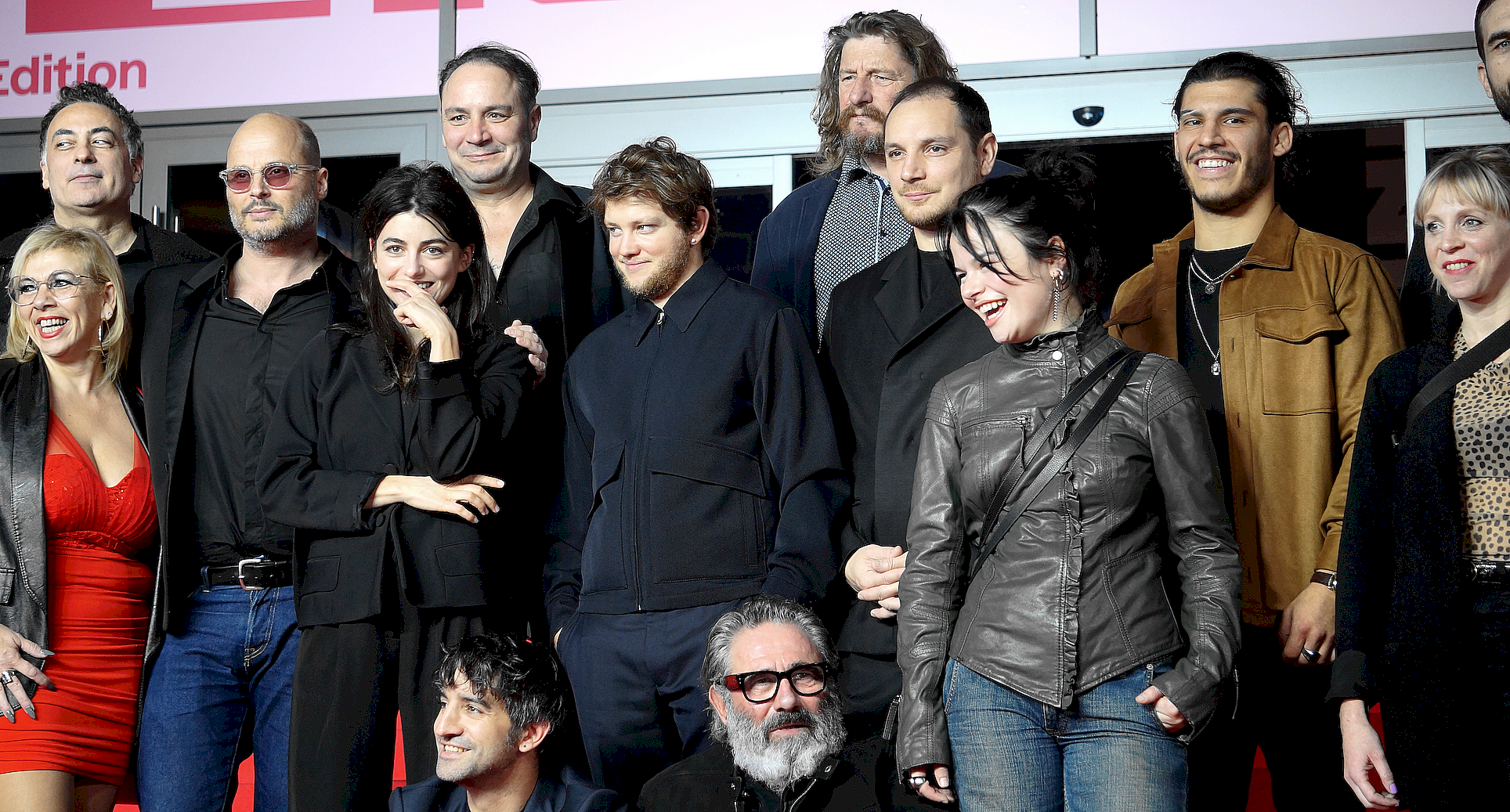
The cast of Maldoror at Film Fest Gent 2024

- Anthony Bajon as Paul Chartier
- Alba Gaïa Bellugi as Jeannne 'Gina' Ferrara
- Alexis Manenti as Luis Catano
- Sergi López as Marcel Dedieu
- Laurent Lucas as Charles Hinkel
- David Murgia as Didier Renard
- Béatrice Dalle as Rita
- Lubna Azabal as Mrs. Santos
- Jackie Berroyer as Jacky Dolman
- Mélanie Doutey as Judge Remacle
- Félix Maritaud as Roberto Santos
- Guillaume Duhesme as Dardenne
- Paul Richard Mathy as Tonio Klaude
- Epona Guillaume as Mathilde Witsel

== Production ==
=== Development and inspiration ===
In September 2021, shortly following the premiere of Inexorable, it was announced Fabrice Du Welz was finishing a screenplay for a film titled Maldoror which was expected to begin shooting in 2022. Du Welz co-wrote the screenplay with Domenico La Porta. For the project Du Welz would once again be working with producer Jean-Yves Roubin, who described the film as a blend of thriller and film noir in a similar style to David Fincher's Zodiac (2007).

The film was inspired by the Affaire Dutroux, a notorious crime case that transformed Belgium in the 1990s. The scandal is named for Marc Dutroux, a convicted Belgian serial killer, rapist, and child molester who was sentenced to life in prison in 1996. He was first jailed in 1989 for abduction and rape, but was released on parole after just three years. In 1995 and 1996 he kidnapped six girls, four of whom he later murdered. The lenient result of Dutroux's first prosecution, as well as shortcomings on the part of the police in investigating his murders, caused widespread discontent with the criminal justice system – resulting in the complete reorganisation of Belgium's law enforcement agencies. In the White March held on 20 October 1996, 300,000 Belgian citizens protested the mishandling of the case. Du Welz has stated that case affected him, calling it "a case that personally traumatized me, and all its dysfunctions. We must realize that the Dutroux affair is not a news item but a real state affair, which almost made Belgium implode."

Although based on a real case, the film centers on a policeman tracking down Dutroux, a character which Du Welz fictionalized. Du Welz has stressed that the film is freely inspired by the Dutroux case, and is first and foremost an investigative film. He described it as being "based on the Dutroux case and set in the real Belgium of the 1990s" but that he "wanted above all to talk about the police and judicial dysfunctions that really took place around this case and they are treated in a realistic way, but the plot is fictional. So it's not the Dutroux case brought to the screen." He also stated that it was "designed to shed light on a societal trauma and offer a fresh perspective on our ability to confront evil". Du Welz had wanted to make the film for 15 years and predicted it would be the biggest project he had ever worked on, even describing it as "the project of [my] life".

Du Welz originally considered making a purely nonfictional film but said it would have been complicated to legally make such a film in Belgium. His decision to fictionalise the case was heavily inspired by Once Upon a Time in Hollywood (2019), a film which he rewatched with "obsession and love":

"When I saw what Tarantino did with a terrible news story, and how he transcended it by even slipping into [alternate history], I told myself that I could make this case my own. On the condition, of course, of being as intelligent and relevant as possible. Today, I have the intuition of having the experience and the perspective to do it. I have my team, incredible actors, producers who surround me... The ambition is to take a terrible event but not to treat it literally. Rather to cinematically alter reality."

=== Cast and financing ===
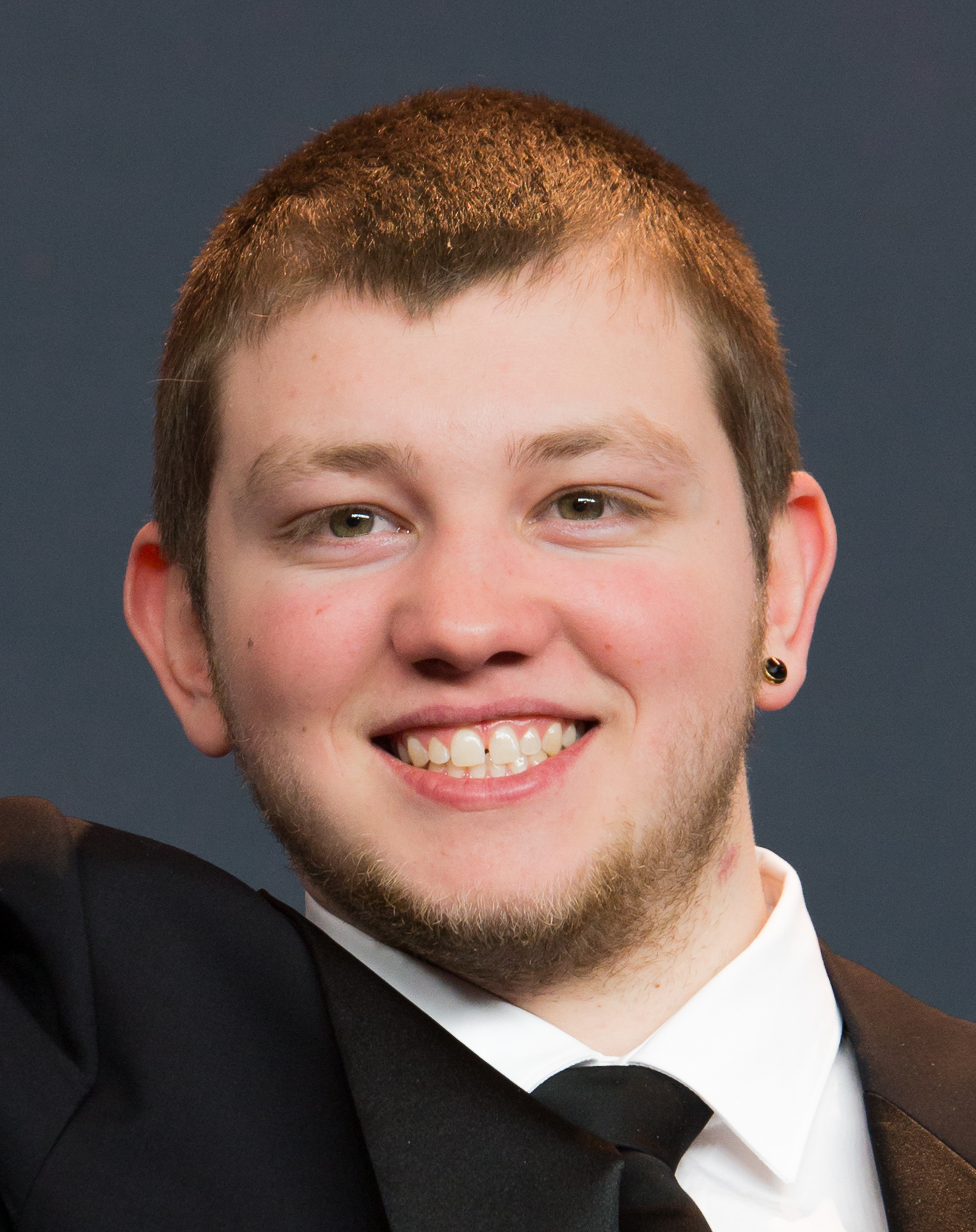
Anthony Bajon

Anthony Bajon, known for the films The Prayer (2018) and Junkyard Dog (2023), plays the lead role of police recruit Paul Chartier. Co-stars include Alba Gaïa Bellugi, Alexis Manenti (who starred alongside Bajon in Athena) and Sergi López. The cast includes several actors in secondary roles who have worked with Du Welz in the past, including Laurent Lucas and Jackie Berroyer, both of whom starred in his 2004 psychological horror Calvaire. Du Welz described both actors as "family" with whom he felt comfortable to focus on "just the work, quickly and well, in the service of a film." He also originally intended for Benoît Poelvoorde to star in the role freely inspired by Marc Dutroux, a character which he said would more closely resemble Frank Booth from Blue Velvet (1986) than Dutroux himself.

The film was produced by Jean-Yves Roubin for the Belgian company Frakas Productions, and by Manuel Chiche and Violaine Barbaroux for the French company The Jokers Films, who will also distribute the film in France. It was co-produced by RTBF, VOO and BE TV, Shelter Prod and France 2 Cinéma, in association with One Eyed, as well with the assistance of the Cinema and Audiovisual Centre of the Wallonia-Brussels Federation. The film also received the support of Canal+ and the participation of Ciné+ as well as several government initiatives such as France Télévisions, Wallimage and the Brussels-Capital Region.

=== Filming ===
Filming was originally expected to begin in fall 2022. However, in August 2022, Frakas Productions published a casting announcement with extras being sought for filming to take place in March 2023 in the Charleroi region. Principal photography, however, ultimately began on 4 May 2023 and wrapped on 28 June. Filming in Marchienne-au-Pont took place beginning on 8 May 2023, where the town hall was used as a production space. The cinematographer was Manu Dacosse, who previously worked with Du Welz on Alleluia (2014), Adoration (2019) and Inexorable (2021).

=== Music ===
The film music was composed by Vincent Cahay, a longtime collaborator of Du Welz who worked on Calvaire (2004), Alleluia (2014), Adoration (2019), Inexorable (2021), and was awarded the Magritte Award for Best Original Score for his contributions to Adoration.

== Release ==
Maldoror was selected to be screened out of competition at the 81st Venice International Film Festival, where it had its world premiere on 3 September 2024. It is Du Welz's first film selected in the Venice lineup since Vinyan (2008). International sales are handled by WTFilms. The Jokers Films is set to distribute the film in France on 15 January 2025. The film is scheduled to be theatrically released in Belgium by O'Brother Film on 22 January 2025.

In August 2025, the film was selected at the Network of the Festivals in the Adriatic Region Programmes in conjunction with 31st Sarajevo Film Festival for Adriatic Audience Award along with other six films.

== Reception ==
=== Critical response ===
On the review aggregator website Rotten Tomatoes, 75% of 12 critics' reviews are positive, with an average rating of 6.3/10.
