= Eigen Kweek =

Belgian Dutch-language crime comedy television series

- Series poster
- Created by: Philippe De Schepper
- Written by: Pieter De Graeve, Mathias Claeys, Bas Adriaensen, Philippe De Schepper
- Directed by: Joël Vanhoebrouck
- Composer: Steve Willaert
- Country of origin: Belgium
- Original language: Dutch
- No. of seasons: 3
- No. of episodes: 18 (+1 special)

Production
- Producers: Katrien Carton; Peter Bouckaert
- Running time: 50 minutes
- Production companies: Eyeworks Film & TV Drama

Original release
- Network: Eén
- Release: 5 November 2013 – 5 February 2019

Related
- Chantal

Eigen Kweek (English: Home Grown) was a 2013-2019 Belgian crime comedy television series on the Belgian channel Eén. It was the most watched TV programme in Flanders in 2013.

The show revolves around a family of local Belgian potato farmers, Jos (Dirk Van Dijck) and Ria Welvaert (Sien Eggers), who lost all their money and try to win it back by growing cannabis. For this reason, it has been called "the Breaking Bad of Flanders". A spin-off series, Chantal (2022) has Maaike Cafmeyer reprising her role as Ria's policewoman friend in the title role.

== Languages ==
The main language in the series is not the standard Dutch spoken in Belgium (Flemish) but West Flemish, a dialect in the province of West Flanders.

As a few characters are from the Philippines, Filipino is also spoken. In order to communicate with them, the locals also speak English with a very strong Flemish accent.

Dunglish is used extensively throughout the series, especially by Frank. This English interspersed with (West) Flemish pronunciations was appreciated by the viewers of Eigen Kweek. Eén responded to this popularity on its website with a 'soundboard' collecting Frank's most striking statements.

Parts of the third season take place in the French Flanders and therefore French is also spoken.

Only conversations in Filipino have subtitles.

== Plot ==
=== Season 1 ===
Jos and Ria Welvaert are potato farmers in Wijtschate. Their nephew Geoffrey proposes them an investment to earn money quickly. However, eight months later, Geoffrey ends up in prison after he spent all the money received from the Welvaerts, who are now in financial troubles.

Meanwhile, Jos and Ria's eldest son, Frank, meets Nenita, the wife of Lucien, a neighbour of his parents. She shows him a picture of her younger sister Julita, who still lives in the Philippines and is willing to be a mail-order bride. After Frank picks her up at the airport, their initial conversations are difficult, partly due to Frank's broken English. Moreover, Julita thinks something is wrong with her, as Frank refuses to have sex straight away. They eventually grow closer and Julita realises that Frank really loves her and didn't bring her to Belgium just for sex. On the other hand, she also sees her sister Nenita being exploited by Lucien.

Frank's younger brother Steven has a small weed plantation in a hangar, together with his friend Fluppe. Jos learns, via the regular house friend and policewoman Chantal, that a lot of money can be made with growing weed. He makes a proposal to Steven to grow more weed together to get rid of their debts: they buy seeds in the Netherlands and start their cannabis plantation.

A little later, the police arrives near the Welvaerts' house. Jos and Steven think they have found their hangar full of weed, but it turns out that they came for his neighbour Lucien's, who is also involved in drug deals and is immediately arrested. The police raid scares Jos, who decides to tell Ria about their weed plantation.

In the meantime, Nenita finds Lucien's drug money, about 150,000 euros, and wants to flee back to the Philippines with Julita. However, Julita has fallen in love with Frank and does not want to go back. Nenita then leaves alone to the Philippines with the money, while two thieves break into Lucien's house on the same night, but fail to find the drug money.

Geoffrey, released from prison, returns to Jos and Ria, after Jos realises that Geoffrey knows some drug dealers. The next time that Jos and Steven drive to the hangar, however, a police car is there. It is Geoffrey, who had sex with Chantal, tied her to the bed and drove with her car to the hangar, where he still had money from before when he was arrested.

Later, the two thieves return to Lucien's house and Julita, who happened to be there, is kidnapped. The kidnappers are Klaas Museeuw, known as "Den Hollander", and Bernard Warlop, who feels pity for Julita and eventually develops Lima syndrome. In order to recover the drug money, Den Hollander demands a ransom of 150,000 euros from the Welvaert family. Steven proposes to give the kidnappers the 120 kilograms of weed they grew themselves in exchange for Julita and 150,000 euros, since they can easily sell the drug for double for it.

After Jos and Frank have left to meet Den Hollander, Chantal visits Ria and tells her that the federal police plans to capture Den Hollander, as they know that he is going to make a big deal with weed. Steven transports the weed to Bernard, so that Den Hollander can release Julita to Jos and Frank; when the police arrives, Den Hollander leaves by car but is shot. Just then also Ria and Chantal arrive, explaining that Jos and Frank wanted to arrange the ransom behind the back of the police but have nothing to do with the drugs. This is confirmed: no drugs are found in both cars, but 150,000 euros are present, which are handed over to the Welvaerts.

Six months later, Julita is heavily pregnant, just like Chantal, from her night with Geoffrey, of whom she has not heard anything since. In the last scene, Bernard explains to his five children that they should put five grams of the stuff in front of them in a bag, and do this until the entire supply is gone...

=== Christmas special ===
Julita is heavily pregnant and a week overdue. Due to a house fire, she and Frank have to stay at Frank's parents for a while. The Welvaerts traditionally celebrate Christmas Eve with the pastor. However, it turns out that Lucien has been released and lives in the care of the pastor, who wants to take him along.

When Frank learns that Lucien has been invited, he leaves with Julita, looking for a hotel. Since everything is fully booked, they decide to celebrate in their car next to the road. When Julita's water breaks, the car's battery is dead due to the Christmas lights. They leave on foot and eventually end up in the Nativity scene of the Nollet family, where Julita gives birth to Franky.

=== Season 2 ===
Four years later, Patrick Museeuw shows up to claim his brother's money. Since the Welvaert family have already spent it, he forces Jos to grow cannabis again in order to recover the money as quickly as possible, by threatening little Franky. Bernard has debts with den Hollander, so he is forced to help.

Chantal discovers accidentally the cannabis plantation but she is knocked down by Museeuw, who orders the Welvaerts to move the plants to their own hangar, where their cultivation was done four years ago. At Frank's house, meanwhile, Bernard becomes friend with Pepita, Julita's aunt who is visiting for three months.

Eventually, the entire Welvaert family manages to overpower and chain Museeuw. Later on, Ria finds the code to open the safe at Museeuw's house and recovers the photos that he took with his polaroid, which could incriminate her family. Steven, who is transporting part of the drugs to Dranouter, receive a call from Jos: he should go to Museeuw's house, where they can put the weed in order to get Museeuw caught by the police.

Before their plan is fulfilled, however, Museeuw frees himself and claims to the police to have evidence that the drugs were grown by the Welvaert family and drives with them to his house. Jos, who was waiting there, calls again Steven and asks him to stay out of there with the weed. Then he calls Frank and Ria, so that they can empty their hangar from the rest of the weed, because Museeuw will tell the police to go there. Jos escapes from the back door, while Museeuw discovers that his safe is empty.

Frank's family car turns out to be gone, as are Bernard and Pepita. When he and Ria arrive at the hangar, simultaneously with the police, they have no time to remove the weed. Museeuw accuses them to grow drugs in the hangar together with Bernard. However, to everyone's surprise, the hangar turns out to be empty: nothing is found except a few car seats. Frank recognises the seats of his family car and understands what happened: Bernard took all the drugs and growing material from the hangar during the night.

Museeuw is definitively arrested, while Jos and Steven burn the photos and throw the rest of the weed in a forest. Bernard sells all the weed and equipment, and a few days later Julita receives a text from Pepita, saying that Frank can pick up his car at Schiphol Airport.

The last scenes show Julita pregnant with her second child, while Chantal receives a report that Bernard Warlop has left Schiphol for the Philippines. Since Pepita is also on the same plane, Chantal thinks it is not a coincidence, so the story of den Hollander could be true...

=== Season 3 ===
Chantal is convinced that the brother of 'Den Hollander' spoke the truth and that the Welvaert family has indeed secretly grown weed, so she conducts a private investigation to prove it. She sees Jos and Fluppe at the hangar and thinks they are dealing with weed again. When Chantal confronts the Welvaert, Jos is forced to admit to Ria that he was trying to sell the potato farm because neither Frank nor Steven want to work there.

Meanwhile, a new police commissioner, René Vanderlinden, has arrived from Antwerpen. He wants to transform the local police into a modern and efficient team, but enters immediately into conflict with Chantal's independent way of working. He finds her file on the Welvaerts and informs the examining magistrate, who has a search warrant extradited. Due to her friendship with Jos and Ria, Vanderlinden suspects that Chantal could be an accomplice.

Griet finds out to be pregnant by Steven, but the two broke up a while ago. While babysitting Chantal's daughter, she discovers a lot of photos of the Welvaerts in Chantal's desk, including a picture of a weed leaf. She informs Steven, who manages to keep her quiet by promising to marry her. Griet introduces him to her parents but her father Piet, who is the examining magistrate, refuses to speak with him until the case involving his family has been cleared.

Julita is also pregnant and is expecting a triplet of girls. When Frank and Julita's house are searched, plans of a weed plantation are found in Frank's car, leading the police to a small hangar filled with weed. Frank ends up in prison after the owner of the hangar shows a rental contract with Frank's signature.

Meanwhile, Chantal starts an investigation into her new boss, since she believes that he is the one who framed Frank. She follows him to a brothel in Oost-Cappel, where he appears to be a friend of the owner, the French criminal Maurice Le Moko. Moreover, she hears them talking about her as a nuisance.

When the court suspects that the signature was falsified and the witness lied, Frank is released pending trial. On request of Chantal, he goes to Oost-Cappel together with Steven and Jos to find information on Vandenlinden; they discover that he met Maurice only a few weeks ago. Since Steven is reluctant to the marriage, Ria goes to Griet's parents hoping to talk with them. There she overhears that Griet's father Piet was corrupted by Maurice and was responsible for putting the weed plans in Frank's car.

Vanderlinden confronts Chantal, who realises that she misunderstood the dialogue at the brothel and that Piet profited of Vanderlinden's overzealousness to frame Frank. Vanderlinden admits that he visits regularly the brothel for the prostitutes, but he is otherwise innocent. When further evidences appear, he understands that Chantal's suspicions over Maurice and Piet are right.

Piet, who is passionate about military history, organises a re-enactment for the 100th anniversary of the Battle of Messines, where he will play general Plummer, and the Welvaerts will also participate. After Piet refuses to further collaborate with him, Maurice devises a plan to kill him, since he is the only one knowing his activities. He instructs his gangsters to pose as soldiers but secretly carry real weapons to shoot Piet.

Vandenlinden and Chantal start working together and become attracted to each other. They follow the gangsters to their hangar in order to trap them, but they have sex in the car and don't see them leaving. At the re-enactment Piet is shown to be sorry for his actions and promises that he will help Frank to win the trial. The gangsters barely wound Piet and flee, but are followed by Frank and Steven until the hangar, where they are trapped by Maurice and the other accomplices. Vandenlinen and Chantal, who never left the hangar, are able to save them and arrest the gangsters.

After the birth of Julita's and of Griet's babies, the entire family Waelwart, together with Chantal and Vanderlinden, celebrate with a barbecue. Jos has not sold the farm, and his two sons work there together. In the last scene Fluppe is seen returning from the airport with a Filipina wife, facing the same communication problems experienced by Frank and Julita at the beginning of the series.

== Cast ==
In the table below C stays for Christmas special.

Actor/Actress	Character	Season				Description
Actor/Actress	Character	1	C	2	3	Description
Dirk Van Dijck	Jos Welvaert	•	•	•	•	Frank and Steven's father, Ria's husband
Wim Willaert	Frank Welvaert	•	•	•	•	Jos and Ria's eldest son
Sebastien Dewaele	Steven Welvaert	•	•	•	•	Jos and Ria's youngest son
Sien Eggers	Ria Goudezeune	•	•	•	•	Frank and Steven's mother, Jos' wife
Rhoda Mae Montemayor	Julita Pineda	•	•	•	•	Frank's wife
Maaike Cafmeyer	Chantal Vantomme	•	•	•	•	Policewoman, friend of Ria
Wouter Bruneel	Filip "Fluppe" Verkest	•	•	•	•	Friend of Steven
Liesa Naert	Griet Despriet	•	•	•	•	Steven's girlfriend
Piv Huvluv	Stefaan	•	•	•	•	Policeman, colleague of Chantal
Günther Lesage	unnamed	•	•	•	•	Pastor of the village
Maria Vanhooren	Ludwina	•		•	•	Acquaintance of Jos and Ria
Stefaan Degand	Bernard Warlop	•		•		Helper of the Museeuw brothers
Sam Louwyck	Klaas "Den Hollander" Museeuw	•				Gangster
Sam Louwyck	Patrick Museeuw			•		Brother of "Den Hollander", gangster
Rudi Delhem	Lucien Busschaert	•	•			Neighbour of the family Welvaert
Theodosia Tadiar	Nenita Pineda	•				Julita's older sister and Lucien's wife
Thomas Ryckewaert	Geoffrey Goudezeune	•				Ria's nephew
Jan Hammenecker	Jerry	•		•		Garage owner, Frank's boss
Mieke Dobbels	Katrien	•				Jerry's wife
Kasper Vandenberghe	Francis "Cisse"	•			•	Acquaintance of Steven
Hannes Reckelbus	Patrick	•			•	Acquaintance of Steven
Jerica Nelson	Pepita Pineda			•		Julita's aunt
Unknown baby	Franky Welvaert		•			Frank and Julita's son
Quinten Somers	Franky Welvaert			•		Frank and Julita's son
Milan Bouckenhove	Franky Welvaert				•	Frank and Julita's son
Alice Erard	Emma Vantomme			•		Chantal (and Geoffrey)'s daughter
Miet Dujardin	Emma Vantomme				•	Chantal (and Geoffrey)'s daughter
Pauwels Dirk	Norbert Nollet			•	•	Farmer, acquaintance of Jos and Ria
Peter Van Den Begin	René Vanderlinden				•	Police commissioner
Mathias Sercu	Piet Despriet				•	Examining magistrate, Griet's father
Katelijne Verbeke	Betsy Despriet		•		•	Griet's mother
Serge Larivière	Maurice Le Moko				•	French gangster boss
Tom Ternest	Benny Bostyn				•	Belgian gangster
Jean-Luc Couchard	unnamed				•	French gangster
Bart Claeys	Rik Versele				•	Owner of the café
Jan Van Hecke	unnamed				•	Frank's fellow prisoner

== Production and distribution ==
The filming took place in Wijtschate, a sub-municipality of Heuvelland, in West Flanders.

The first season was broadcast on Eén in the fall of 2013. Initially, the series had one season, but due to the great success, it was decided to add two more seasons. The second season aired in spring 2016. A special Christmas episode aired on Christmas 2016; although it aired between seasons 2 and 3, it takes place between seasons 1 and 2. The third season aired from New Year 2019 and concluded the series.

== Spin-off ==
In 2020 a spin-off of the series, entitled Chantal was announced. It focusses on the policewoman Chantal Vantomme, who moves with her daughter to the small town of Loveringem to lead the local district police station.

The first season aired from September 2022 and the series was renewed for a second season.

== Episodes ==
=== Season 1 ===
1. Een Interessante Investering (An Interesting Investment)
2. Mijn Ma Was Mee (My Mother Came Along)
3. Operatie Plukketuffers (Operation Bud-tokers)
4. What Is That With The Washing Machine
5. Tot 7x70 maal (For 7x70 times)
6. En geen flikken! (And No Cops!)

=== Christmas Special ===
1. Kerstspecial (Christmas special)

=== Season 2 ===
1. Er is daar een mijnheer (There's a man over there)
2. Ut je schuv'n bluv'n (Keep out of my drawers)
3. Coloradokevers (potato beetles)
4. Sick from Stockholm
5. Jos, maak me nu los (Jos, let me go)
6. The Code out a Dream from Mama

=== Season 3 ===
1. Bezig met etwuk (Busy with something)
2. Beschuldigd van etwa (Accused of something)
3. Wholemoal alone (All alone)
4. No kotje kotje
5. Ze blow up job
6. Tende (the end)
