= Cold Moon =

Cold Moon can refer to:

- Cold Moon (1991 film)
- Cold Moon (2016 film)
