= Chantal (TV series) =

Belgian comedy-drama television series

- Genre: Crime drama, comedy
- Created by: Mathias Sercu
- Written by: Mathias Sercu
- Directed by: Jeroen Dumoulein
- Starring: Maaike Cafmeyer; Dries Heyneman; Mathias Sercu; Steven Mahieu; Yves Degryse; Zouzou Ben Chikha; Anna-Marie Missoul
- Music by: Steve Willaert
- Opening theme: "'t Kan Ier Oal" (Maaike Cafmeyer, Steve Willaert)
- Country of origin: Belgium
- Original language: West Flemish
- No. of seasons: 3
- No. of episodes: 16

Production
- Producer: Peter Bouckaert
- Cinematography: Maxime Lahousse
- Running time: 50 min
- Production company: Eyeworks Film and TV Drama

Original release
- Release: 4 September 2022

Related
- Eigen Kweek

Chantal is a Belgian crime drama, comedy television series, which was broadcast from 4 September 2022 by Eyeworks Film and TV Drama. It is a spin-off of Eigen Kweek (English: Home Grown) (2013, 2016, 2019), which introduced the character of Chantal Vantomme, portrayed by Maaike Cafmeyer. Cafmeyer reprises her role as Chantal, who has been appointed police inspector in the fictitious West Flanders town of Loveringem. She investigates various crimes with assistance from local police officer Rik (Dries Heyneman) despite interference from her rival Johnny (Mathias Sercu). Besides acting, Sercu created and wrote the series while Jeroen Dumoulein directed. Chantal's first season of eight episodes was followed by a second season of six episodes from 21 January 2024. The third season was filmed during 2024, and streamed from 6 March 2025.

== Premise ==
Chantal is the newly appointed chief inspector at the Loveringem police station. Initially she faces condescending or abrasive behaviour from male colleagues and community leaders. The station is attached to the town hall where Mayor Wim often checks in on their investigations. At first, her second-in-charge, Rik, believes she will be a failure. Rik becomes more accommodating after Chantal out-smarts her rival detective, Johnny. Chantal and her daughter Emma make friends with their truck driver, neighbour Arne. Rik's friend Muze runs Café de Miserie, which often holds Cowboy-themed events. Chantal intends to sit for a Commissioner's exam, move to Brussels for training and become a chief of police. Chantal, Rik and her squad continue to solve various cases despite misdirection or interference from Johnny. One of her cases has Emma's class taken hostage in the town hall by Bjorn. Bjorn is Emma's teacher Els' brother, who attempts to discredit an influential businessman, Roland.

Both Chantal and Johnny sit the Commissioner's exam, but only Chantal passes. However, she decides to remain in Loveringem due to Emma's friendships with her classmates. During season two Chantal is investigated by Committee P to determine whether her conduct was professional during the town hall hostage case.

== Cast and characters ==
- Maaike Cafmeyer as Chantal Vantomme: Loveringem police chief inspector, Emma's mother
- Dries Heyneman as Rik Cloedt: police inspector, self-styled "Sheriff", initially contemptuous of Chantal
- Mathias Sercu as Johnny D'Haese: Veurne-based Crime Unit's chief inspector, Chantal's rival, former police college classmate
- Steven Mahieu as Arne Goedvriendt: trucker, former bus driver, Chantal's neighbour, widower, becomes Chantal's friend
- Yves Degryse as Wim Vanhecke: Mayor, married to Dorien, also realtor
- Zouzou Ben Chikha as Muze: Café de Miserie bar manager, Rik's best friend, Noor's father
- Anna-Marie Missoul as Emma Vantomme: Chantal's daughter, her father fled overseas on criminal charges, fifth grade student, becomes friends with Noor and Milou

=== Recurring cast ===
- Bert Huysentruyt as Pascal Plovy a.k.a. The Indian: former West Coast Warrior biker, Indian enthusiast, Didier's cousin
- Kurt Defrancq as Koen Huyghe: Veurne's Chief of Police, Chantal's and Johnny's boss, dismissive of Chantal's career aspirations
- Hanna Lesage as Noor: Muze's daughter, Emma's classmate-friend
- Julie Delrue as Els Heytens: Emma's schoolteacher, Bjorn's sister, Bart's daughter
- Wim Opbrouck as Roland Schiettekatte: Ria's husband, Véronique's father, Willy's son. Influential businessman, construction company owner, land speculator
- Emma Catry as Milou: Noor's classmate, Roland's granddaughter, becomes Emma's friend
- Adrian Sack as Eddy Driessens: policeman-receptionist
- Benoit Dorné as Kurt: policeman, Rik's assistant
- Begir Memeti as Besnik Dushku: national crime police, Bart's colleague
- Steve Geerts as Bart Storms: national crime police, Besnik's colleague
- Mieke Dobbels as Dorien: Wim's wife, Wibe's mother
- Silke Thorrez as Sylvie Velghe: Johnny's wife, Rik's former girlfriend, glamour model (Miss Elegance 2011)
- Anouk David as Mia Verkest: local, erratic driver, Roger's wife

=== Season one only ===
- Patrycja Pulit as Goska Boniek: biker, "Dirty" Didier's sometime girlfriend
- Robrecht Vanden Thoren as Christophe Bulcke: Véronique's widower, Roland's son-in-law, Veurne politician, Wim's rival
- Piet De Praitere as Daniël Louage: Siska's domineering brother, wastrel, serial pest
- Janne Desmet as Siska Louage: Daniël's sister, Chantal's neighbour
- Michiel Soete as Bjorn Heytens: Els' brother, Bart's son
- Aiko Vanparys as Lise Loosveldt: Chantal's neighbour, Daisy's owner, long-running feud with Louages
- Mil Degrijse as Jordy: Noor's classmate, boisterous
- Hans Roelens as Landbouwer (English: "Farmer"): show dog owner, Lise's rival
- Anne Denolf as Ria Schiettekatte: Roland's wife, Véronique's mother

=== Season two only ===
- Patricia Kargbo as Felke Debruyne
- Peter Bulckaen as Firmin Dezutter
- Han Coucke as Meeuws

== Production ==
Chantal was announced in June 2020, as a spin-off of Eigen Kweek, which had ended after three seasons in the previous year. It was produced by Eyeworks Film and TV Drama. Mathias Sercu created and wrote the series with Jeroen Dumoulein directing. Main music was composed by Steve Willaert, while the opening credits song, "'t Kan Ier Oal" (English: "It's all Possible Here") was performed by Cafmeyer on lead vocals, lyrics by Annelies Cappaert and music by Willaert. An expanded version of that song was issued as a single by Cafmeyer in January 2024. West Flanders towns of Alveringem and Lo-Reninge are used to depict fictitious Loveringem.

== Episode guide ==
=== Season one ===
No. overall	No. in season	Title	Directed by	Written by	Original release date
1	1	"Murder in the Far West Part 1" (Moord in de Far West)	Jeroen Dumoulein	Mathias Sercu	4 September 2022
Rik sees Daisy the dog's corpse. Kurt consoles Lise. Arne watches. Chantal meets Muze, who accuses her of theft. Rik enters. Chantal had left her coin on cafe's bench. Chantal leaves. Rik tries to assert his authority, but she outwaits Muze, Rik. Chantal arrives home; neighbouring crime scene. Emma complains, Chantal counters: leave after Chantal passes commissioner's exam. Chantal at police station, Rik tries barring her, she ignores him. Chantal flashes ID badge, meets Wim. Wim introduces Chantal to squad. Rik hands Daisy's file to Chantal. Rik: Daniël killed Daisy. Els introduces Emma to classmates. Daisy poisoned by mincemeat. Arne meets Chantal. Rik complains to Muze about Chantal. Chantal interviews Daniël: Siska: deny all official complaints. Louages wake at 3 a.m.; place loudspeakers near Lisa's fence: dogs barking. Lise wakes. Koen to Chantal: nothing happens in Loveringem. Rik interviews Lise without informing Chantal. Chantal recaps information, which squad already know. Chantal, Rik visits Lise's dog show rivals. Rik annoys Chantal with his misogynistic diatribes. Chantal attends Miserie bar; drinks with Rik. Emma, Noor on school excursion. Chantal drives Rik, rebuffs his pass. Smoke from Louages' caravan. Siska yells "Daniël!". Chantal, Arne try dousing flames. Caravan collapses; corpse burnt.
2	2	"Murder in the Far West Part 2" (Moord in de Far West - deel 2)	Jeroen Dumoulein	Mathias Sercu	11 September 2022
Chantal scolds Rik for last night's presumption. Regional police arrive. Chantal enters crime scene. Rik wakes when Johnny arrives. Chantal updates Johnny. Caravan afire by 3 a.m. Johnny: petrol fire. Johnny suspects Lise as revenge for Daisy's death. Chantal, Johnny interview Lise, who confesses to setting caravan fire. Johnny arrests Lise: case closed. Rik complains to Muze over Johnny. After Rik leaves, Muze explains: Rik and Johnny rivals over Sylive. Chantal learns Arne filmed his truck. Chantal views previous week's footage. She sees man enter Louages' home. Arne: that's Pascal. Chantal, Rik meet Pascal, who lies: never visited Siska's home. Chantal describes video. Pascal's pacifist: did not kill Daniël. Video shows "Farmer" taking package to Lise's. Pascal to Chantal: romanced Siska; Daniël attacked Siska; Pascal defended her. Daniël choked Pascal. Siska wraps cord around Daniël's neck, Daniël dies; Pascal leaves. Koen castigates Johnny: Daniël died before fire – no smoke in lungs. Siska lies: Daniël sat on couch watching TV for three days. Placed Daniël into caravan to clean house. Lise set caravan alight. Johnny arrives to claim Siska's arrest. Arne fixed Chantal's boiler. Lise's murder charge dropped. "Farmer" arrested for killing Daisy. Pascal checks hidden deep freezer: female corpse inside.
3	3	"The Miraculous Resurrection of Véronique Schiettekatte" (De wonderbaarlijke verrijzenis van Véronique Schiettekatte)	Jeroen Dumoulein	Mathias Sercu	18 September 2022
Month later: Mia reports hit-and-run driver: Véronique. Rik scoffs; refuses to take her statement. Rik details Véronique cancer death. Chantal, Rik visit Christophe. Chantal photographs Véronique's car. Koen phoned Wim to tell Chantal to leave Christophe alone. Chantal takes Emma, Noor to beachside; girls want to do project on Indians. Pascal's freezer flashes alert; corpse starting to defrost. Chantal meets Sylvie with Johnny. On her way home, Chantal sees "Véronique" passing. After Mia lodges official complaint, Chantal has Eddy collect hospital car park's CCTV. Video shows car backing towbar into Mia's car, "Véronique" alights, sees Mia, drives off. Christophe feigns disbelief when Chantal provides collision photos. Chantal, Rik check Christophe's car: no towbar. Koen to Johnny: determine Veronique's impersonator. Chantal peruses CCTV; logs car's appearances: every Wednesday at 4:30 p.m. car visits hospital. Pascal hides freezer, Chantal arrives with Emma and classmates. Pascal tutors them about Indians. Chantal, Rik wait in car park; "Véronique" arrives in rental car. Chantal, Rik follow "Véronique", who visits Christophe's demented mother. Christophe poses as "Véronique" to cheer up his mother. Christophe agrees to pay for Mia's repairs. Koen praises Johnny for solving case, but Johnny has no idea. Arne returns girls to Chantal's home.
4	4	"Who the Fuck Is Colossus?" (Who the F*ck Is Colossus?)	Jeroen Dumoulein	Mathias Sercu	25 September 2022
As Etienne turns, Rinus attacks; Etienne's unconscious. Neighbour's car toots; Dobbels brothers retreat. Rinus drives; Quinten: only scare Elienne. Wim: alderman, business partner injured. Etienne in coma. Roland threatened Wim. Quinten to Rinus: "Colossus" wants money back. Rinus: money's spent. Roland to police: threatened Wim with legal action; did not have Etienne beaten. Wim, Dorien and son Wibe share meal. Chantal agrees to date Johnny. Wim, Dorien separate. Etienne's neighbour: two hooded men driving Dobbels Plumbers' van. Chantal, Rik interview plumber: played cards with friends. Quinten sees police, runs. Rik apprehends Quinten, Rinus. Quinten: hired by "Colussus"; Rinus: do not talk; brothers arrested. Pascal packs belongings. Chantal delivers Emma, Noor, Milou. Pascal: Roland's building villa here. At home, Chantal, Johnny have sex. Johnny: taking Commissioner's exam. At Miserie, Chantal sees drunken Wim. Wim: Dorien wants divorce. In Etienne's hospital room, Chantal reads get well cards: Dorien's Etienne's lover. Chantal visits Dorien; Wibe on computer. Dorien: affair for five months; Wim's too soft. Rik: €500 paid to Quinten from Wim's account. Police ask Wim about payment. Chantal determines Wibe, as "Colossus", hired Quinten. Chantal arrives to collect girls; they hide, but Pascal finds them quickly. Pascal dumps corpse in forest.
5	5	"Bride in the Woods" (Bruid in het bos)	Jeroen Dumoulein	Mathias Sercu	2 October 2022
Wim discovers bride's corpse in forest; Pascal pushes Wim into grave. Forensic squad examine corpse. Johnny arrives with Sylvie, who recognises Van Tuyne dress. Besnik, Bart takeover from Johnny. Bart: bride was pregnant. Chantal: biker tattoo, GB heart DD. Johnny: bikers led by "Dirty" Didier. Didier's DNA taken, which matches bride's baby. Didier: killed bride, Goska, with spanner. Didier cannot recall buying dress. Chantal to Rik: get Van Tuyne. Chantal asks Johnny: delay processing case. Muze alerts Chantal: bikers after "Indian". Chantal drives to Pascal's, who hides with girls under stairs. Chantal stalls 20 bikers. Rik arrives, warns bikers off. Bikers edge forwards, armed. Johnny approaches with reinforcements; biker grabs Chantal hostage. Chantal disarms biker; whole gang arrested. Chantal, Rik release Emma, Noor, Milou. Girls give class presentation with Pascal; including tomahawk display. Chantal arrests Pascal: CCTV photos of Pascal, Goska buying dress. Didier to Pascal: divorcing Ilse, marrying Goska. Forensic diagnosis: sharp object killed Goska. Pascal: he killed Goska with tomahawk, not Didier; Pascal arrested. Johnny claims victory. Pascal, in prison, to Chantal: after finding Goska dead, heard Ilse crying. She held bloodied tomahawk. Pascal, Didier hid body in freezer. Pascal takes blame so Ilse can raise children.
6	6	"Elektra" (Elektra)	Jeroen Dumoulein	Mathias Sercu	9 October 2022
Alexia asks father, Claude about her horse, Elektra. Rik sees Joosten flailing in canal. Rik dives in, saves Joosten. Police recover horse's head. Johnny's separated from Sylvie; learns Chantal's preparing for Commissioner's exam. When Chantal arrives, Rik's already interviewing Joosten. Chantal joins. Joosten: found head about midnight, disposed of it but fell into canal. Chantal tells squad about exam – all support her. Neighbour finds Elektra's corpse in Joosten's barn. Joosten: does not use barn. Chantal sees photo of Joosten kissing Alexia. Joosten: Alexia does not want fiancé, Simon. Claude informs Alexia of Elektra's death. Alexia stomps off past mother, Irene. Koen puts Chantal, Johnny on Elektra case. Chantal cautions Claude: not accuse Joosten on radio. Rik finds blood in stall; Claude admits cleaning up. Johnny interviews Joosten, who seduces female students, but he's infertile. At Roland's behest, Koen advises Chantal, Johnny: drop Elektra case. Chantal, Rik question Simon: wedding's cancelled. Joosten splits with Alexia, moving to London. Squad check Joosten's ex-lovers; Chantal, Johnny sit exam. Witness to Chantal: Irene, historically, was Joosten's lover. Chantal learns Irene's afraid that Joosten's Alexia's father. Claude killed Elektra, cut her up, framed Joosten. Chantal: Joosten's infertile. Chantal helps Arne log into dating sites.
7	7	"Oh Father Where Art D'hou? Part 1" (Oh father where art d'hou?)	Jeroen Dumoulein	Mathias Sercu	16 October 2022
Bjorn breaks into Schiettekattes' mansion. Roland, Ria notice opened front door: call police. Chantal, Rik enter. Roland: father's bust stolen. Koen assigns Chantal, Johnny to case. Chantal to Koen: exam result: 19/20. Koen: Johnny failed. Bjorn lives with his aunt. Chantal completes Arne's dating site profile. Rik congratulates Chantal on exam result. At sports centre: chain-locked, graffiti: "1 Quiz: Who built this?" Wim: by Roland, while Willy was Mayor. Chantal visits Pascal, who educates prisoners. Flashback: Arne prepares for first date. Johnny visits Chantal for drinks, they have sex. Present: Post office: chain-locked, "2 Quiz: Who built this?" Chantal: Roland. Chantal: Rik should apply for her position. Emma prepares dinner for Chantal, Arne. Arne stood up his date. Aunt finds Bjorn's left home. Swimming pool: chained, graffiti. CCTV shows same culprit. Rik berates Chantal for affair with Johnny, who overhears them. Chantal: ending affair. Roland offers reward for bust. After school, Chantal enters, finds Willy's bust. Els explains Bjorn's plan: get Roland's confession that their father designed buildings. At gunpoint, Bjorn stops Chantal leaving. He imprisons Chantal in town hall, confined by duct tape. Bjorn places bust on Mayor's table. Later, Chantal sleeps on mat, Bjorn on guard.
8	8	"Oh Father Where Art D'hou? Part 2" (Oh father where art d'hou? - deel 2)	Jeroen Dumoulein	Mathias Sercu	23 October 2022
Bjorn guards Chantal. Rik enters squad room, no Chantal. Bjorn tapes Wim in his chair. Els brings class to Town Hall. Kurt leaves them into waiting chamber. Town Hall door, "4 Quiz Finale". Bjorn locks Kurt outside. Rik: buildings have messages spelling afleiding (English: distraction). Bjorn pretends to be detective, Els takes photos with children, himself, his gun. Police outside Town Hall. Bjorn: Wim phone Roland. Chantal finally escapes. Bjorn to Roland: 15 minutes to get here before killing Milou. Roland alerts Koen to hostages. Bjorn sees police squad. Roland enters hall. Chantal to Els: getting children out. Bjorn tapes Roland next to Wim. Muze delivers Chantal's instructions to Rik. Bjorn brings Chantal, Els into room. Els "tapes" Chantal alongside Wim. Rik: Chantal wants half hour. Koen: Bruges strike team at wrong town. Els brings children to Rik; Muze takes them to cafe. Bjorn films Roland confession: buildings were Bart's work. Johnny enters Wim's office, Chantal disarms Bjorn. Bjorn arrested. Roland destroys camera's recording. Chantal empties gun's clip. Chantal to Koen: no bullets; children in nearby cafe. Strike team arrive. Chantal had recorded Roland's confession, which Els plays for her mother. Chantal sends copy to TV station. Chantal, Emma staying.

=== Season two ===
No. overall	No. in season	Title	Directed by	Written by	Original release date
9	1	"Who is Miguel? Part 1" (Wie is Miguel?)	Unknown	Unknown	21 January 2024
10	2	"Who is Miguel? Part 2" (Wie is Miguel? - deel 2)	Unknown	Unknown	28 January 2024
11	3	"Family" (Familie)	Unknown	Unknown	4 February 2024
12	4	"Peculiar Person" (Vreemde vogel)	Unknown	Unknown	11 February 2024
13	5	"Operation Vandenberghe Part 1" (Operatie Vandenberghe)	Unknown	Unknown	18 February 2024
14	6	"Operation Vandenberghe Part 1" (Operatie Vandenberghe - deel 2)	Unknown	Unknown	25 February 2024
