= Jackie Berroyer =

French actor, comedian and writer

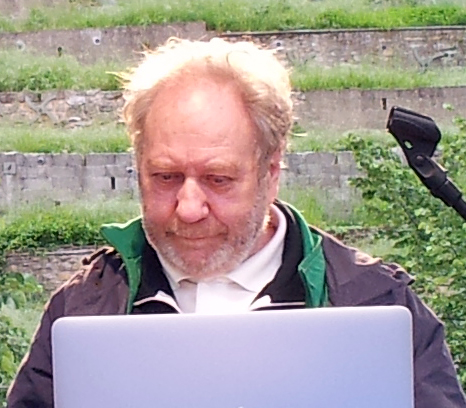
- Jackie Berroyer in 2013
- Born: 24 May 1946 (age 78); Reims, France
- Occupation(s): Actor, comedian, writer
- Years active: 1986–present

Jackie Berroyer (born 24 May 1946) is a French actor, comedian and writer.

== Filmography ==
Year	Title	Role	Director	Notes
1991	Cold Moon	The monk	Patrick Bouchitey	
1993	Les gens normaux n'ont rien d'exceptionnel	Mr. Jacquet	Laurence Ferreira Barbosa	
1994	Le Péril jeune	Jo	Cédric Klapisch	
1994	Cold Water	Christine's father	Olivier Assayas	
1994	Un indien dans la ville	Jonavisky	Hervé Palud	
1994	Tous les garçons et les filles de leur âge...	The philosophy teacher	Laurence Ferreira Barbosa & Olivier Assayas	TV series (2 episodes)
1996	Encore	Abel Vichac	Pascal Bonitzer	
1996	Caméléone	Moskowitz	Benoît Cohen	
1996	Des lendemains qui chantent	The critic	Caroline Chomienne	
1996	Vladimir de trop	Monsieur Schneider	Jacques-Henri Rochereuil	Short
1996	Alla turca	The commissioner	Macha Méril	TV movie
1996	L'embellie	Charles	Charlotte Silvera	TV movie
1997	The Swindle	Robert Chatillon	Claude Chabrol	
1997	Une femme très très très amoureuse	Mathieu	Ariel Zeitoun	
1997	Je ne vois pas ce qu'on me trouve	Pierre Yves	Christian Vincent	
1997	Tempête dans un verre d'eau	Jean	Arnold Barkus	
1997	Le silence de Rak	The Inspector	Christophe Loizillon	
1998	L'annonce faite à Marius	Professor Migeon	Harmel Sbraire	
1998	Ça n'empêche pas les sentiments	The bailiff	Jean-Pierre Jackson	
1998	Ivre mort pour la patrie	The little boy	Vincent Hachet	TV Short
1999	Un dérangement considérable	Pierre	Bernard Stora	
1999	Quand on est amoureux c'est merveilleux	The butcher	Fabrice Du Welz	Short
2000	La Chambre obscure	The king	Marie-Christine Questerbert	
2000	Les frères Soeur	Francis France	Frédéric Jardin	
2001	HS - hors service	Ifergan	Jean-Paul Lilienfeld	
2001	La bête de miséricorde	Inspector Alain Castan	Jean-Pierre Mocky	
2001	Gilbert Mouclade était un marrant	The psy	Elie-Alexandre Le Hoangan & Camille Saféris	Short
2002	Les araignées de la nuit	Strike Examiner	Jean-Pierre Mocky	
2002	Vu à la télé	Alain	Daniel Losset	TV movie
2003	Rien que du bonheur	Pierre	Denis Parent	
2003	Quelques jours entre nous	Monsieur Loiret	Virginie Sauveur	TV movie
2004	Calvaire	Bartel	Fabrice Du Welz	
2004	When the Sea Rises	Béthune	Yolande Moreau & Gilles Porte	
2004	3 Dancing Slaves	Robert	Gaël Morel	
2004	Look at Me	The friend	Agnès Jaoui	
2004	A Common Thread	Monsieur Lescuyer	Éléonore Faucher	
2004	À boire	Yves Guibal	Marion Vernoux	
2004	Albert est méchant	Lawyer Kermarec	Hervé Palud	
2004	Les textiles	Paul	Franck Landron	
2004	Malone	Dutilleul	Didier Le Pêcheur	TV series (1 episode)
2005	Imposture	The religious	Patrick Bouchitey	
2005	Voisins, voisines	Monsieur Gonzales	Malik Chibane	
2005	Le mystère Alexia	Pierre de Champignac	Marc Rivière	TV movie
2005	Bien dégagé derrière les oreilles	Dog Arthur	Anne Deluz	TV movie
2005	Les mariages d'Agathe	Robert	Stéphane Kappes	TV series (1 episode)
2006	Jean-Philippe	The physical professor	Laurent Tuel	
2006	Locked Out	The sex-shop's client	Albert Dupontel	
2006	L'éclaireur	Marco Diamanti	Djibril Glissant	
2006	Président	Nicolas	Lionel Delplanque	
2007	Le deal	Inspector Castang	Jean-Pierre Mocky	
2007	Héros	Maurice	Bruno Merle	
2007	Deux vies... plus une	The school's director	Idit Cebula	
2007	L'avare	Lawyer Jacques	Christian de Chalonge	TV movie
2008	La Journée de la jupe	The principal	Jean-Paul Lilienfeld	
2009	Jusqu'à toi	Chloé's father	Jennifer Devoldère	
2009	Le choix de Myriam	Scala	Malik Chibane	TV movie
2009	Suite noire	Pommard	Laurent Bouhnik	TV series (1 episode)
2009	Kaamelott	Pellinor	Alexandre Astier	TV series (3 episodes)
2010	Ladyboys	Edgar	Joel Warnant	
2010	Opération 118 318 sévices clients	Agent Pole Emploi	Julien Baillargeon	
2010	Je suis un no man's land	Philippe's father	Thierry Jousse	
2010	En chantier, monsieur Tanner!	The neighbor	Stefan Liberski	TV movie
2010	Sable noir	Mathieu	Benjamin Holmsteen	TV series (1 episode)
2010-2011	Les invincibles	Paul Boisvert	Alexandre Castagnetti & Pierric Gantelmi d'Ille	TV series (9 episodes)
2011	À la maison pour Noël	The homeless	Christian Merret-Palmair	TV movie
2011	Fortunes	Marcel	Stéphane Meunier	TV series (1 episode)
2011-2012	La chanson du dimanche	Monnier	Alexandre Castagnetti, Alec & Julius Berg	TV series (20 episodes)
2012	Looking for Hortense	Lobatch	Pascal Bonitzer	
2012	Mobile Home	Jean-Marie	François Pirot	
2012	Nos plus belles vacances	Monsieur Guilois	Philippe Lellouche	
2012	Par les épines	Jean-Louis	Romain Nicolas	
2012	Rue Mandar	Monsieur Mardi	Idit Cebula	
2012	Des arêtes dans le bifteck	Ulysse	Patricia Dinev	Short
2012	Karma Koma	Païpaï	Aurélia Mengin	Short
2012	Profilage	Bernard Marchand	Alexandre Laurent	TV series (1 episode)
2013	Henri	Bibi	Yolande Moreau	
2013	Love Is in the Air	Arthur	Alexandre Castagnetti	
2013	Je suis supporter du Standard	Jacky	Riton Liebman	
2013	Pauvre Richard!	The bar's owner	Malik Chibane	
2013	Mohamed Dubois	Gérard Dubois	Ernesto Oña	
2013	De l'usage du sex-toy en temps de crise	The medecin	Éric Pittard	
2013	La chambre blanche	Noel Alterstein	Bertrand Lenclos	
2013	J'adore ma vie!	The psy	Stéphane Kurc	TV movie
2014	Pitchipoï	Pierre Friedmann	Charles Najman	
2014	Les jours venus	Blaise	Romain Goupil	
2014	La clef des champs	Patrick	Bertrand Van Effenterre	TV movie
2014	Le Family Show	Gérald Rioux	Pascal Lahmani	TV movie
2015	Phantom Boy	The mole	Jean-Loup Felicioli & Alain Gagnol	
2015	The Roommates Party	Monsieur Abramovitch	Alexandra Leclère	
2015	Cosmodrama	The astronomer	Philippe Fernandez	
2015	Nos chers voisins	Christian	Nath Dumont	TV series (1 episode)
2015	Le mystère du lac	Pierre Leitzi	Jérôme Cornuau	TV series (6 episodes)
2016	Death by Death	The waiting man	Xavier Seron	
2016	Sélection officielle	Franck Belrive	Jacques Richard	
2017	Garde alternée	Sandrine's father	Alexandra Leclère	
2017	We Are Tourists	Ronan	O'ar Pali & Remy Bazerque	
2018	Neuilly sa mère, sa mère!	Ricoeur	Gabriel Julien-Laferrière	
2018	Le Malheur des Autres	Charles	Barbara Schulz	Short
2018	Cajou	Yvon	Claude Le Pape	Short
2018	Et le diable rit avec moi	Maurice	Rémy Barbe	Short
2018	Capitaine Marleau	The psy	Josée Dayan	TV series (1 episode)
2018	Hippocrate	Jean-Pierre Bayle	Thomas Lilti	TV series (3 episodes)
2018	Qu'est ce qu'on attend pour être heureux ?	Deville	Marie-Hélène Copti & Anne Giafferi	TV series (4 episodes)
2019	The Truth	The Chef	Hirokazu Kore-eda	
2021	Inexorable		Fabrice du Welz	
2024	Maldoror		Fabrice du Welz	
