= The Brand New Testament =

2015 European comedy film

- Theatrical release poster
- Directed by: Jaco Van Dormael
- Written by: Jaco Van Dormael; Thomas Gunzig
- Produced by: Jaco Van Dormael; Frank Van Passel
- Starring: Benoît Poelvoorde; Catherine Deneuve; François Damiens; Yolande Moreau; Pili Groyne
- Cinematography: Christophe Beaucarne
- Edited by: Hervé de Luze
- Music by: An Pierlé
- Production company: Terra Incognita Films
- Distributed by: Le Pacte
- Release dates: 17 May 2015 (Cannes); 1 September 2015 (Belgium)
- Running time: 113 minutes
- Countries: Belgium; France; Luxembourg
- Language: French
- Budget: $8.7 million
- Box office: $15.7 million

The Brand New Testament (French: Le Tout Nouveau Testament) is a 2015 fantasy black comedy film written, produced, and directed by Jaco Van Dormael. It is a co-production among Belgium, France, and Luxembourg. The film was screened at the Directors' Fortnight section at the 2015 Cannes Film Festival. It was selected as the Belgian entry for the Best Foreign Language Film at the 88th Academy Awards, making the December shortlist of nine films, but was not nominated. The Brand New Testament received ten nominations at the 6th Magritte Awards, winning four awards, including Best Film and Best Director for Van Dormael. The Brand New Testament, a satire of religion, has become a cult film.

== Plot ==
God lives in an apartment in Brussels which he shares with his meek wife and his 10-year-old daughter Ea, to whom he is emotionally and physically abusive. God is a grumpy sadist who created humankind specifically to have something to torment. He manipulates reality via the computer in his office. One day when he forgets to lock the door, Ea sneaks in, sees on the computer how God has been making humans suffer, and confronts him about it. He is furious and whips Ea with his belt. Ea decides to rebel against her father. Together with her brother Jesus, who secretly lives in their apartment disguised as a statue, she decides to go into the world, find six more apostles and have a "brand new testament" written. Ea steals the office key, accesses the database with all birthdays and times of death of every human in the world, and has the computer send a text message to each of them announcing their time of death. Then she randomly takes six persons' records from the database, puts a software lock on God's computer, and escapes from the apartment through their washing machine, which Jesus hacked to provide a tunnel to the outside world. Wandering the streets of Brussels, Ea first enlists a homeless man, Victor, to be her scribe, since she cannot write well, and then begins to find her six apostles to narrate their own life stories for the Testament.

The first apostle is a reclusive woman who lost her left arm in an accident and feels nobody will love her. The second is a man who hates his work and his life, and has decided to never move from a bench in the park now that he knows the date of his death. Ea translates to allow him to converse with a bird. This induces him to follow a flock of birds to the North Pole. The third apostle is a sexually frustrated man who is awkward with women and remains lovesick for a German girl he met once as a boy. With Ea's encouragement, he becomes a voice actor for porn movies, where he encounters and establishes a relationship with his lifelong fixation. The fourth apostle is a man who is fascinated with death and killing. He purchases a rifle and shoots people knowing that, since all death dates are already predetermined, they cannot be his responsibility. Ea prods him to shoot a woman, the first apostle. When she doesn't die, because he hit her in her prosthetic arm, he believes this to be a divine signal, starts a relationship with her, and learns to embrace life instead of death. The fifth apostle is an elderly woman trapped in a loveless marriage, especially now that her husband knows he will outlive her by many years. Ea persuades her to cheat on her husband. She has sex with a young male prostitute, and then forms a love relationship with a gorilla. The gorilla scares her husband away, to her delight. The sixth apostle is a sickly boy who, with only days left to live, decides to live them as a girl. Ea encourages her to live each day as the equivalent of one month.

God is horrified when he discovers what Ea has done and that he can no longer torment humans. Locked out of his computer, he is powerless. He leaves the apartment using the same route that ends in a laundry room, and in the real world he suffers all the mistreatment and frustrations he created for mankind. He is assaulted by everyone he meets. When he wants to go back, he finds that the tunnel to his apartment has disappeared and he is trapped on Earth powerless and alone. He takes shelter in a church, where his outrageous criticism of his son Jesus Christ provokes a charitable priest into beating him senseless and eventually gets him locked up with a group of illegal immigrants that are to be deported to Uzbekistan.

Ea and her apostles go to the seaside where hundreds of people have gathered to spend the last hours of their lives. An airplane approaches: it's carrying the group of immigrants, including God, under police escort, and is scheduled to crash onto the beach and kill everyone according to God's own previous programming. In the meantime, God's wife has realized that the number of apostles has grown to 18, her favorite number, enters her husband's office and cleans up. In the process, the computer restarts and now invites her to take control. The previously scheduled death dates are overruled. The airplane regains altitude and the world is reset under a flower-filled sky. Victor's Brand New Testament is published, becomes a bestseller, and catapults him out of hopeless poverty into a new life of fame and fortune. God reaches Uzbekistan where he is put to work on an assembly line manufacturing washing machines. He frantically checks each washing machine if maybe it has an escape hatch that will take him back to his apartment.

== Cast ==
- François Damiens as François (fourth apostle)
- Didier De Neck as Jean-Claude (second apostle)
- Catherine Deneuve as Martine (fifth apostle)
- Pascal Duquenne as Georges
- Romain Gelin as Willy (sixth apostle)
- Pili Groyne as God's daughter, Ea
- Johan Heldenbergh as The priest
- Serge Larivière as Marc (third apostle)
- Johan Leysen as Martine's husband
- Marco Lorenzini as Victor (the scribe)
- Yolande Moreau as God's wife
- David Murgia as JC, Ea's brother
- Benoît Poelvoorde as God
- Laura Verlinden as Aurélie (first apostle)

== Reception ==
The Brand New Testament received generally favorable reviews from film critics. On Rotten Tomatoes, the film holds an approval rating of 82%, based on 74 reviews with an average rating of 7/10. The website's critical consensus reads, "The Brand New Testament takes a surreal, subversive, and funny look at Biblical themes through a modern — and refreshingly original — lens." At Metacritic, the film received an average score of 70 out of 100, based on 17 reviews from mainstream critics, indicating "generally favorable reviews".

== Accolades ==
Award / Film Festival	Category	Recipient(s)	Result
Austin Film Critics Association	Best Foreign Language Film	The Brand New Testament	Nominated
Belgian Film Critics Association	Best Film	The Brand New Testament	Won
Biografilm Festival	Europa Audience Award	The Brand New Testament	Won
Biografilm Festival	Guerrilla Award for Best Film	The Brand New Testament	Won
Cannes Film Festival	Art Cinema Award	The Brand New Testament	Nominated
Cannes Film Festival	Europa Cinemas Label Award	The Brand New Testament	Nominated
Cannes Film Festival	SACD Prize	The Brand New Testament	Nominated
César Awards	Best Foreign Film	The Brand New Testament	Nominated
David di Donatello	Best European Film	The Brand New Testament	Nominated
European Film Awards	Best European Comedy	The Brand New Testament	Nominated
European Film Awards	Best Production Designer	Sylvie Olivé	Won
European Film Awards	People's Choice Award for Best European Film	The Brand New Testament	Nominated
European Film Festival Palić	Best Film	The Brand New Testament	Nominated
Fantastic Fest	Best Comedy	The Brand New Testament	Won
Filmfest Hamburg	Art Cinema Award	The Brand New Testament	Nominated
Francophone Film Awards	Best Film	The Brand New Testament	Nominated
Francophone Film Awards	Best Screenplay	Jaco Van Dormael and Thomas Gunzig	Won
Francophone Film Awards	Best Actor	Benoît Poelvoorde	Nominated
Francophone Film Awards	Best Supporting Actress	Yolande Moreau	Nominated
Golden Globe Awards	Best Foreign Language Film	The Brand New Testament	Nominated
Gopo Awards	Best European Film	The Brand New Testament	Nominated
Haifa International Film Festival	Best International Film	The Brand New Testament	Won
Haifa International Film Festival	Carmel Award	The Brand New Testament	Nominated
Lumière Awards	Best French-Language Film	The Brand New Testament	Nominated
Luxembourg Film Awards	Best Film in Coproduction	The Brand New Testament	Won
Luxembourg Film Awards	Best Technical Achievement	Marco Lorenzini	Nominated
Magritte Awards	Best Film	The Brand New Testament	Won
Magritte Awards	Best Director	Jaco Van Dormael	Won
Magritte Awards	Best Screenplay	Jaco Van Dormael and Thomas Gunzig	Won
Magritte Awards	Best Supporting Actress	Yolande Moreau	Nominated
Magritte Awards	Best Supporting Actor	David Murgia	Nominated
Magritte Awards	Most Promising Actress	Pili Groyne	Nominated
Magritte Awards	Most Promising Actor	Romain Gelin	Nominated
Magritte Awards	Best Cinematography	Christophe Beaucarne	Nominated
Magritte Awards	Best Sound	François Dumont, Michel Schillings and Dominique Warnier	Nominated
Magritte Awards	Best Original Score	An Pierlé	Won
Méliès d'Or	Best European Fantastic Film	The Brand New Testament	Nominated
Norwegian International Film Festival	Audience Award	The Brand New Testament	Won
Norwegian International Film Festival	Special Jury Prize	The Brand New Testament	Won
Palm Springs International Film Festival	Best Narrative Feature	The Brand New Testament	Runner-up
Satellite Awards	Best Foreign Language Film	The Brand New Testament	Nominated
Sergio Amidei Award	Best Screenplay	Jaco Van Dormael and Thomas Gunzig	Nominated
Sitges Film Festival	Best Film	The Brand New Testament	Nominated
Sitges Film Festival	Best Actress	Pili Groyne	Won
Sitges Film Festival	Best European Fantastic Film	The Brand New Testament	Won
Tallgrass Film Festival	Outstanding Narrative Feature	The Brand New Testament	Won
Trailers FilmFest	Best European Trailer	The Brand New Testament	Won

== See also ==
- List of submissions to the 88th Academy Awards for Best Foreign Language Film
- List of Belgian submissions for the Academy Award for Best Foreign Language Film
