= The Claus Family =

2020 Dutch-Belgian film

- Film poster
- Dutch: De Familie Claus
- Directed by: Matthias Temmermans
- Written by: Matthias Temmermans; Ruben Vandenborre
- Starring: Jan Decleir; Mo Bakker; Stefaan Degand
- Cinematography: Philip van Volsem
- Edited by: Dries Meinema
- Music by: Anne-Kathrin Dern
- Production company: Dingie
- Distributed by: Netflix
- Release date: 7 December 2020
- Running time: 97 minutes
- Country: Belgium
- Language: Dutch

The Claus Family (Dutch: De Familie Claus) is a 2020 Dutch-Belgian film directed by Matthias Temmermans, written by Matthias Temmermans and Ruben Vandenborre and starring Jan Decleir, Mo Bakker and Stefaan Degand.

== Plot ==
Suzanne moves with her children Jules and Noor from The Netherlands to Belgium as she found work in a Belgian biscuit factory. During her work hours, Noël - her father in law - takes care of the children. By coincidence Jules finds in his grandfather's possessions a magical snow globe which can transport him to anywhere in the world. He also discovers his grandfather is the real Santa Claus. Noël has a secret workshop in the North Pole where he gets help from some elves, but he gets health issues and is no longer able to deliver the Christmas presents over the world so Jules is forced to help him. However, Jules hates Christmas as his father died the previous year on Christmas Eve and is not eager to help. This gets worse after he finds out Santa Claus does not live forever and all eldest children in his family tree are made to take over the role of Santa Claus once the predecessor dies or got too old. At the same time, the biscuit factory is about to go bankrupt as management does not want to invest in new tastes. Determined to spread "light on the dark times", Suzanne tries baking her signature colorful cookies but is caught and has to forfeit her job after not getting any calls from Jules. Jules returns home to receive a severe tongue-lashing from his distraught mother who questions him about his selfishness. Still bitter that his mother doesn't seem to get his pain over his father's death, Jules storms into his room. Ella, his wise babysitter (who is later revealed to be an amputee - having lost part of her leg) informs him that while no one can force him to move on, he needs to learn to let go of the past and not "terrorize everyone because he feels sorry for himself". Ella encouraged Jules to open a letter his father left him. Jules confesses his fear that if he opens the letter, it would mean that his dad is really gone and that this is his way of saying goodbye. Suzanne feels ashamed of snapping at her son and talks with her friend who worked at the cookie factory about the family's grief since her husband's tragic accident. Suzanne and Jules reconcile and Suzanne confesses that she too is grieving but is merely trying to figure out a way for herself and her family. Inspired by Ella's advice and Suzanne's admittance, Jules reads his father's final letter which details that while his father maybe dead, he is never truly gone as he lives on in his son. Jules is comforted by his father's final words and is reinvigorated to save Christmas and fulfill his destiny.

By the end of the movie, Jules delivers the presents on his own, along with home made cookies that his mother made with her coworkers and her manager at the biscuit factory, which were sold to a number of people, including the President of the United States. Finally, Jules sets up a Christmas tree - symbolizing that he has reconciled with his emotional past with Christmas. Jules, Grandfather Noel, Suzanne, Noel, Ella and their friends celebrate Christmas together.

== Cast ==
- Jan Decleir as Noël Claus
- Mo Bakker as Jules Claus
- Stefaan Degand as Holger
- Eva van der Gucht as Gunna
- Bracha van Doesburgh as Suzanne / Mama
- Sien Eggers as Het
- Josje Huisman as Ikka
- Renée Soutendijk as Oma
- Pommelien Thijs as Ella
- Wim Willaert as Stef
- Rashif El Kaoui as Farid
- Tom De Beckker as Inbreker
- Mieke De Groote as Dokter
- Janne Desmet as Assa
- Amber Metdepenningen as Noor Claus

== Sequels ==
The film spawned two sequels, The Claus Family 2, released in 2021, which focuses on Jules trying to reunite a young girl's family in which Noël refuses to do, and The Claus Family 3, which was released exclusively in 2022. It focuses on Jules' sister, Noor, who discovers that Noël is Santa Claus and helps him and Jules out.
