= Geronimo (2014 film) =

- Film poster
- Directed by: Tony Gatlif
- Screenplay by: Tony Gatlif
- Produced by: Tony Gatlif
- Starring: Céline Sallette; Rachid Yous; David Murgia; Nailia Harzoune
- Cinematography: Patrick Ghiringhelli
- Edited by: Monique Dartonne
- Music by: Delphine Mantoulet; Valentin Dahmani
- Production company: Princes Production
- Distributed by: Les Films du Losange
- Release dates: 20 May 2014 (Cannes); 15 October 2014 (France)
- Running time: 104 minutes
- Country: France
- Language: French
- Budget: € 2.49 million

Geronimo is a 2014 French drama film directed by Tony Gatlif. It premiered in the Special Screenings section at the 2014 Cannes Film Festival on 20 May.

== Cast ==
- Céline Sallette as Geronimo
- Rachid Yous as Fazil
- David Murgia as Lucky
- Nailia Harzoune as Nil
- Vincent Heneine as Antonieto
- Adrien Ruiz as El Piripi
- Aksel Ustun as Kemal
- Tim Seyfi as Tarik
- Sébastien Houbani as Hassan
- Finnegan Oldfield as Nikis Scorpion
- Arthur Vandepoel as Alex
- Maryne Cayon as Soda
- Pierre Obradovic as Yougos
- Alexis Baginama Abusa as Yaxa
- Sergi López as Geronimo's father

== Production ==
Filming took place largely in the Loire at Saint-Étienne during the summer of 2013. The film was also shot in Perpignan in the Occitania region.
