= Stéphane Freiss =

French actor (born 1960)

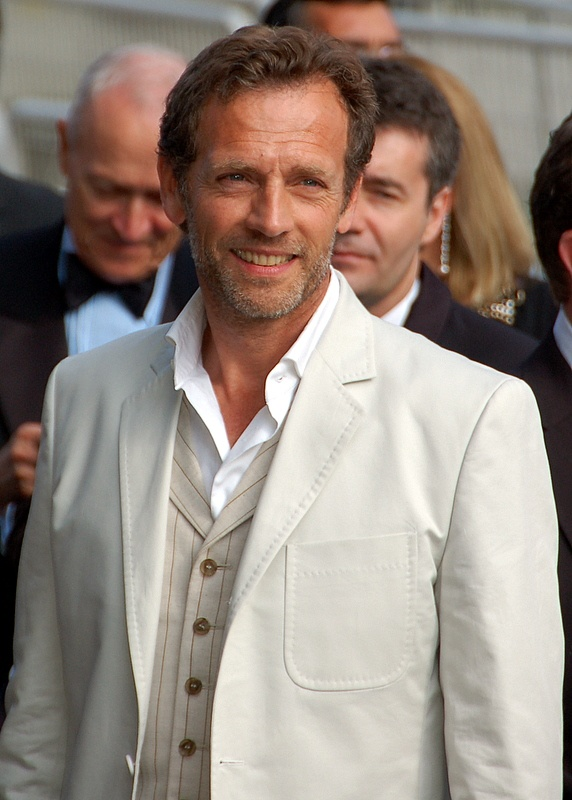
- Freiss at the 2008 Cannes Film Festival
- Born: 22 November 1960 (age 64); Paris, France
- Occupation: Actor
- Years active: 1983–present
- Spouse: Ursula Freiss
- Children: 3

Stéphane Freiss (born 22 November 1960) is a French film, television, and stage actor. He won a César Award for his performance in the 1988 film Chouans!.

== Selected filmography ==
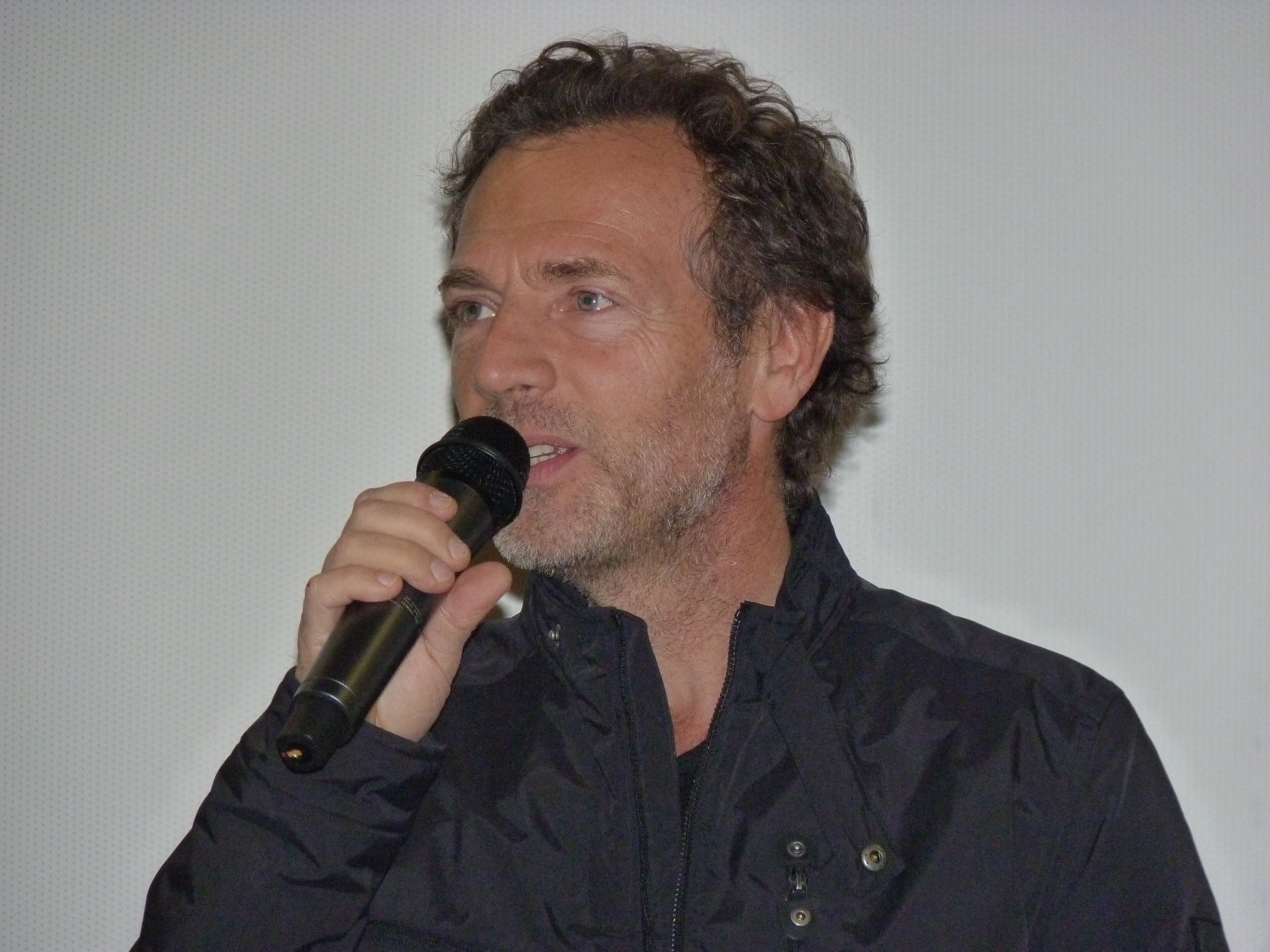
Freiss at the 2012 Cannes Film Festival.

- Premiers désirs (1984)
- Vagabond (1985)
- Chouans! (1988)
- 1001 Nights (1990)
- The King's Whore (1990)
- Does This Mean We're Married? (1991)
- Kings for a Day (1997)
- The Misadventures of Margaret (1998)
- Alias Betty (2001)
- Monsieur N. (2003)
- Crime Spree (2003)
- 5x2 (2004)
- Munich (2005)
- Call Me Elisabeth (2006)
- Welcome to the Sticks (2008)
- Hereafter (2010)
- Another Life (2013)
- My Old Lady (2014)
- The Confessions (2016)
