= Call Me Elisabeth =

- Film poster
- Directed by: Jean-Pierre Améris
- Written by: Jean-Pierre Améris; Guillaume Laurant
- Based on: Je m'appelle Elisabeth by Anne Wiazemsky
- Produced by: Fabienne Vonier; Laurent Champoussin
- Starring: Alba Gaïa Bellugi; Stéphane Freiss; Maria de Medeiros; Yolande Moreau
- Cinematography: Stéphane Fontaine
- Edited by: Laurence Briaud
- Music by: Philippe Sarde
- Distributed by: Pyramide Distribution
- Release date: 15 November 2006 (France)
- Country: France
- Language: French

Call Me Elisabeth (French title: Je m'appelle Elisabeth) is a 2006 French drama film directed by Jean-Pierre Améris, and based on a novel written by Anne Wiazemsky.

== Plot ==
Betty, ten years old, is afraid of ghosts and dark corners. When her sister Agnes goes to boarding school, Betty finds herself alone with her parents Régis and Mado, and Rose, an almost silent housekeeper. Her father is the director of an asylum next to their house, separated only by a wall. A young patient, Yvon, escapes over the wall and hides in the family's garden, where Betty finds him. Moved by his fragility, Betty hides Yvon for several days in the garden's bike shed. She tells him everything she has in her heart, determined to make him her best friend and confidant. Yvon barely communicates. Yet gradually a bond of trust, and then a kind of friendship develop between them.

== Cast ==
- Alba Gaïa Bellugi as Betty / Elisabeth
- Stéphane Freiss as Régis
- Maria de Medeiros as Mado
- Yolande Moreau as Rose
- Benjamin Ramon as Yvon
- Lauriane Sire as Agnès
- Virgil Leclaire as Quentin
- Olivier Cruveiller as The teacher
