= Alba Gaïa Bellugi =

French actress (born 1995)

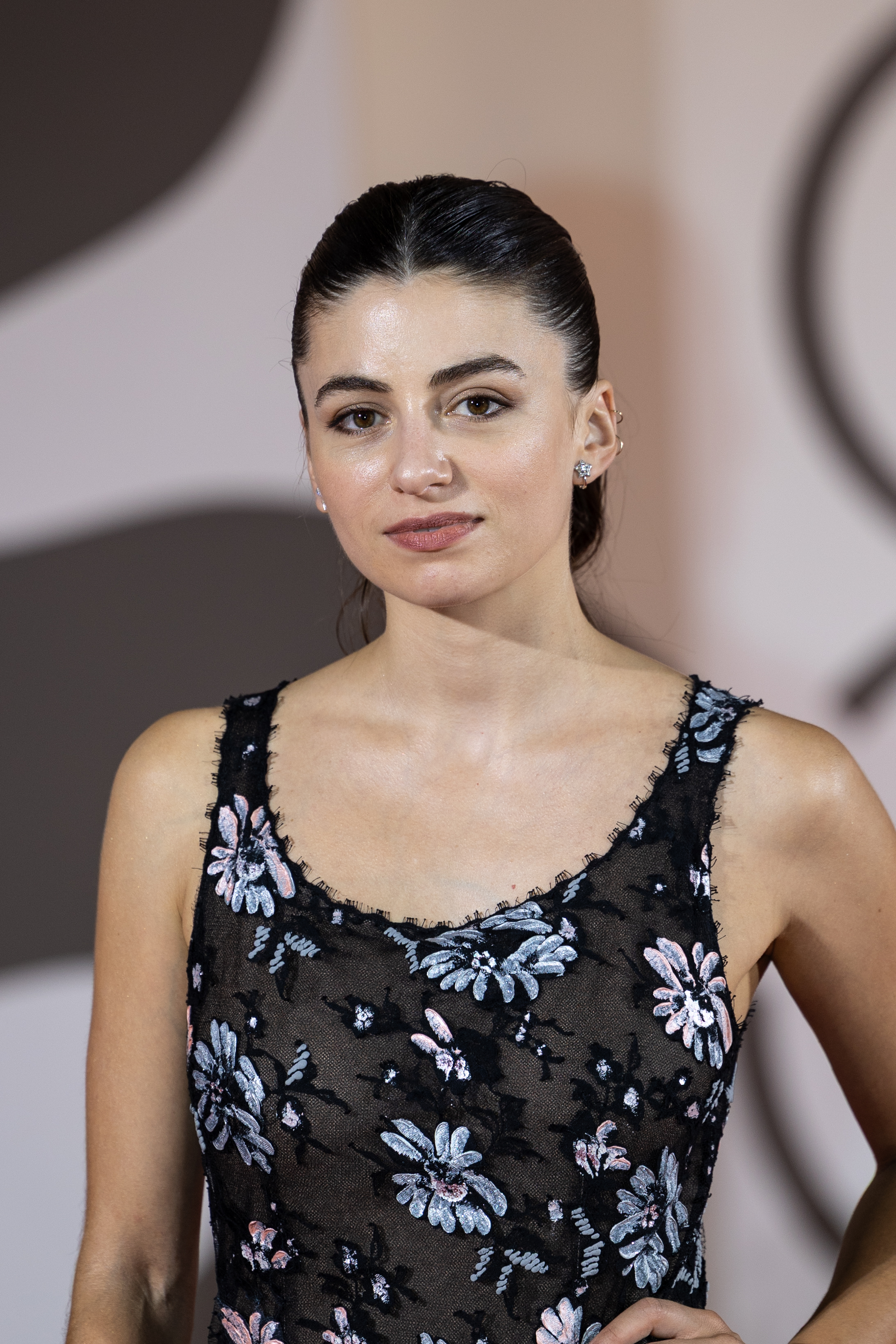
- Bellugi in 2024
- Born: Alba Gaïa Kraghede Bellugi; 5 March 1995 (age 31); Paris, France
- Occupation: Actress
- Years active: 2005–present
- Relatives: Galatea Bellugi (sister)

Alba Gaïa Bellugi (born Alba Gaïa Kraghede Bellugi; 5 March 1995) is a French actress of Danish and Italian origin. She is best known for her performance as Elisa in The Intouchables (2011).

== Selected filmography ==
Television
Year	Title	Role	Notes
2014	Three Times Manon	Manon	Festival international de Televisao de São Paulo 2014—Prix d'interprétation féminine Les lauriers de la radio et de la télévision 2014—Prix d'interprétation féminine
2015–2017	The Bureau	Prune	
2016	Manon 20 ans	Manon	Leading role ACS Award for Best Actress
2020	Into the Night	Ines Mélanie Ricci	Main role
2023	The Swarm	Isabelle Roche	
2023–2024	Concordia	Elodie Cailleux	

Film
Year	Title	Role	Notes
2006	Je m'appelle Élisabeth	Elisabeth	
2009	La Robe Du Soir	Juliette	
2011	The Intouchables	Elisa	
2012	Thérèse Desqueyroux	Thérèse (Young)	
2014	Asinara - La stoffa dei sogni	Miranda	Italian production
2014	Life of Riley	Tilly	
2021	Inexorable	Gloria Bartel	
2024	Maldoror	Jeannne 'Gina' Ferrara	
