= David Murgia =

Belgian actor (born 1988)

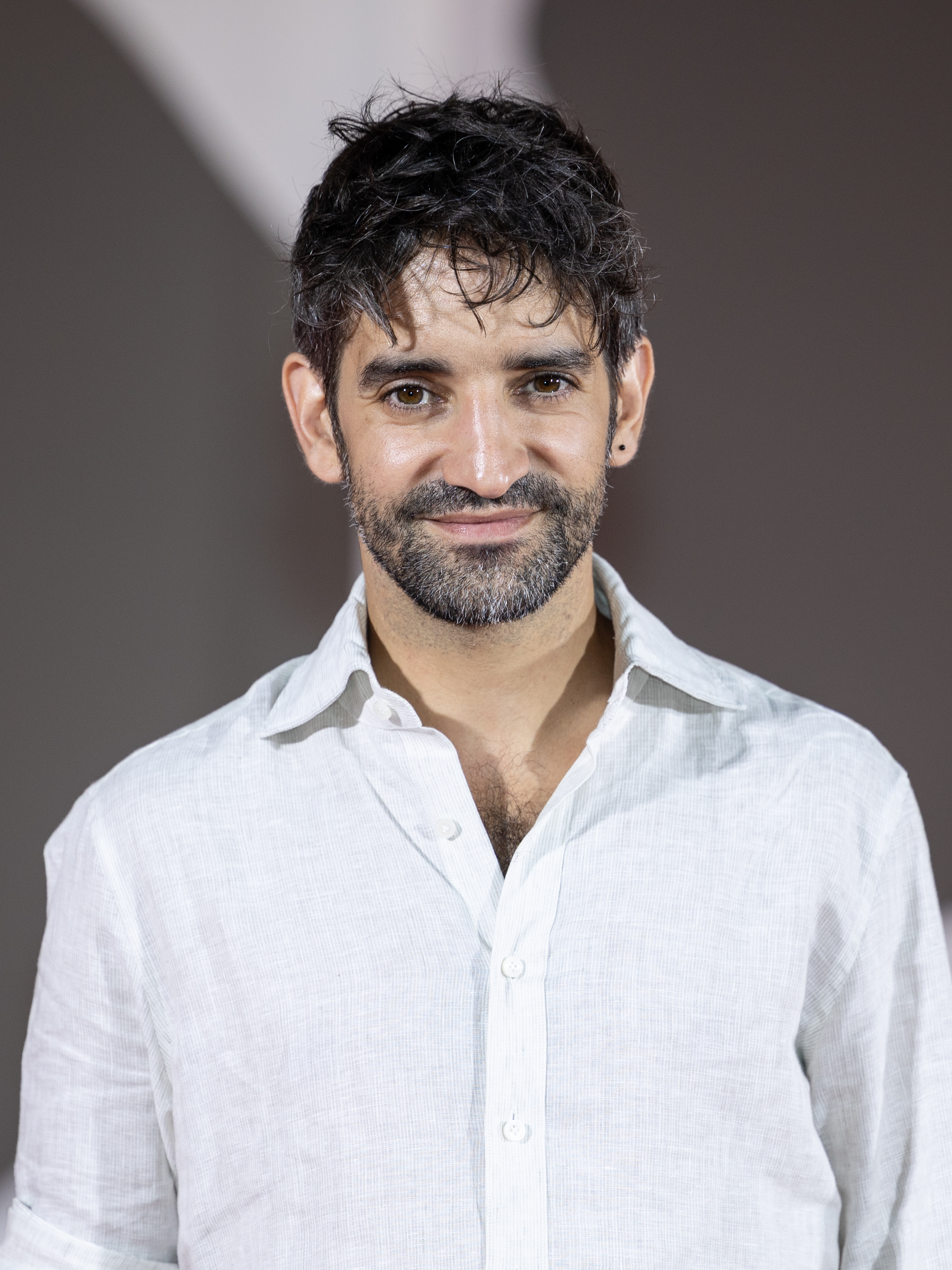
- David Murgia in 2024
- Born: 16 March 1988 (age 37); Verviers, Belgium
- Occupation: Actor
- Years active: 2007-present

David Murgia (born 16 March 1988) is a Belgian actor. He started his career in theatre in the early 2000s and has since gone on to appear in films.

== Theater ==
| Year | Title | Author | Director |
|---|---|---|---|
| 2007 | Jeux de lois | Fabrice Murgia & Francis D'Ostuni | Fabrice Murgia & Francis D'Ostuni |
| 2007-08 | À la mémoire d'Anna Politkovskaïa | Lars Norén | Lars Norén |
| 2008 | Si demain vous déplaît | Armel Roussel | Armel Roussel |
| 2009 | Le Chagrin des ogres | Fabrice Murgia | Fabrice Murgia |
| 2010 | Tête à claques | Jean Lambert | Jean Lambert |
| 2011 | West Pier | Bernard-Marie Koltès | Isabelle Gyselinx |
| 2012 | Le Signal du promeneur | Raoul collectif | Raoul collectif |
| 2013 | Discours à la Nation | Ascanio Celestini | Ascanio Celestini |
| 2014 | L'âme des cafards | David Murgia | David Murgia |
| 2015 | Rumeur et petits jours | Raoul collectif | Raoul collectif |
| 2017 | Laika | Ascanio Celestini & David Murgia | Ascanio Celestini |

== Filmography ==
| Year | Title | Role | Director | Notes |
|---|---|---|---|---|
| 2009 | The Boat Race | Pablo | Bernard Bellefroid | |
| 2009 | Sister Smile | Louvain | Stijn Coninx | |
| 2011 | Bullhead | Bruno Schepers | Michaël R. Roskam | Nominated - Magritte Award for Most Promising Actor |
| 2011 | Le temps du silence | Morales | Franck Apprederis | TV movie |
| 2012 | La tête la première | Adrien | Amélie van Elmbt | Magritte Award for Most Promising Actor |
| 2012 | Tango libre | Luc | Frédéric Fonteyne | |
| 2012 | Approved for Adoption | Cédric | Laurent Boileau & Jung | |
| 2012 | Silence on détourne | Remy | Bernard Garant | Short |
| 2013 | Je suis supporter du Standard | Looping | Riton Liebman | Nominated - Magritte Award for Best Supporting Actor |
| 2014 | Je te survivrai | Kevin | Sylvestre Sbille | Nominated - Magritte Award for Best Supporting Actor |
| 2014 | Geronimo | Lucky | Tony Gatlif | |
| 2014 | Alleluia | Father Louis | Fabrice Du Welz | |
| 2014 | Être | The young man at party | Fara Sene | |
| 2015 | The Brand New Testament | Jesus Christ | Jaco Van Dormael | Nominated - Magritte Award for Best Supporting Actor |
| 2016 | The First, the Last | Willy | Bouli Lanners | Magritte Award for Best Supporting Actor |
| 2017 | Blind Spot | Axel | Nabil Ben Yadir | Nominated - Magritte Award for Best Supporting Actor |
| 2017 | Tous les rêves du monde | Jérémie | Laurence Ferreira Barbosa | |
| 2017 | Je suis resté dans les bois | David | Michaël Bier, Erika Sainte, ... | |
| 2018 | Lockdown | Man in the Stairs | Koen Van Sande | Short |
| 2019 | L'intervention | Patrice Lorca | Fred Grivois | |
| 2019 | Cleo | Alex | Eva Cools | |
| 2021 | Tom Medina | Tom | Tony Gatlif | |
| 2024 | Maldoror | | Fabrice Du Welz | |
