= 15 Minutes of War =

- Film poster
- French: L'intervention
- Directed by: Fred Grivois
- Written by: Fred Grivois; Ileana Epsztajn; Jérémie Guez
- Produced by: Henri Debeurme; Raphaël Rocher
- Starring: Alban Lenoir; Olga Kurylenko; Kevin Layne; Michaël Abiteboul; Sébastien Lalanne; David Murgia; Guillaume Labbé; Vincent Perez; Josiane Balasko
- Cinematography: Julien Meurice
- Edited by: Baxter
- Music by: Fabien & Mike Kourtzer
- Production companies: Capture the Flag Films; Empreinte Cinema; Agora Films
- Distributed by: SND Groupe M6
- Release date: 30 January 2019 (France)
- Running time: 98 minutes
- Countries: France; Belgium
- Languages: French; English
- Budget: $6.2 million
- Box office: $455,000

15 Minutes of War (French: L'intervention, lit. 'The Intervention') is a 2019 French-Belgian war film directed by Fred Grivois. It is freely based on real events known as the Prise d'otages de Loyada.

== Plot ==
In February 1976 in Djibouti, a school bus was taken hostage at the Somali border. The GIGN is sent on the spot, where after 30 hours of tension a rescue operation is organized.

== Cast ==
- Alban Lenoir as André Gerval
- Olga Kurylenko as Jane Andersen
- Sébastien Lalanne as Pierre Cazeneuve
- David Murgia as Patrice Lorca
- Michaël Abiteboul as Georges Campère
- Guillaume Labbé as Jean-Luc Larrain
- Ben Cura as Phillip Shafer
- Vincent Perez as Général Favrart
- Josiane Balasko as Michèle Sampieri
- Kevin Layne as Barkhad
- Moumouni Seydou Almoctar as Mahat

== Production ==
Principal photography on the film was conducted during the summer of 2017.
