= Prejudice (2015 film) =

- Film poster
- Directed by: Antoine Cuypers
- Written by: Antoine Cuypers; Antoine Wauters
- Produced by: Benoît Roland
- Starring: Nathalie Baye; Arno Hintjens; Thomas Blanchard; Ariane Labed
- Cinematography: Frédéric Noirhomme
- Edited by: Elif Uluengin
- Music by: Ernst Reijseger; Francesco Pastacaldi
- Production companies: Wrong Men; Lucil Film; CTM Pictures
- Distributed by: Cinéart (Belgium)
- Release dates: 2 October 2015 (FIFF); 7 October 2015 (Belgium)
- Running time: 105 minutes
- Countries: Belgium; Luxembourg; Netherlands
- Language: French
- Box office: $200.000

Prejudice (Préjudice) is a 2015 drama film directed by Antoine Cuypers and co-written by Cuypers with Antoine Wauters. The film is an international co-production between Belgium, Luxembourg and the Netherlands. It opened the 30th Festival International du Film Francophone de Namur on 2 October 2015.

== Cast ==
- Nathalie Baye as Mother
- Arno Hintjens as Alain
- Thomas Blanchard as Cédric
- Ariane Labed as Caroline
- Éric Caravaca as Gaetan
- Cathy Min Jung as Cyrielle
- Julien Baumgartner as Laurent
- Arthur Bols as Nathan

== Accolades ==
Award / Film Festival	Category	Recipients and nominees	Result
Magritte Awards	Best Film		Nominated
Magritte Awards	Best First Feature Film		Nominated
Magritte Awards	Best Screenplay	Antoine Cuypers and Antoine Wauters	Nominated
Magritte Awards	Best Supporting Actor	Arno Hintjens	Nominated
Magritte Awards	Most Promising Actor	Arthur Bols	Nominated
Magritte Awards	Best Cinematography	Frédéric Noirhomme	Nominated
Angers European First Film Festival	European Feature Films	Antoine Cuypers & Wrong Men North	Won
VDKUF Award	Best Actor	Thomas Blanchard	Won
