= An Pierlé =

Belgian musician (born 1974)

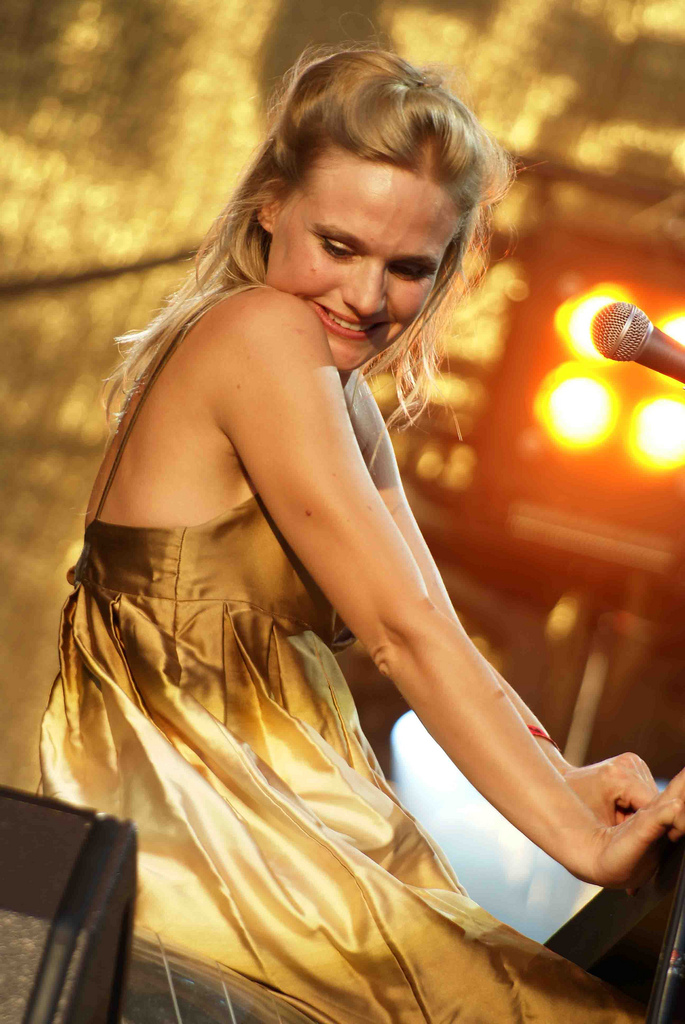
- Pierlé in 2006

Background information
- Born: An Miel Mia Pierlé; 13 December 1974 (age 51); Deurne, Belgium
- Occupations: Musician, songwriter
- Instruments: Vocals, piano
- Years active: 1996–present
- Label: PIAS Recordings
- Website: myspace.com/anpierleandwhitevelvet

An Pierlé (born An Miel Mia Pierlé on 13 December 1974) is a Belgian pianist and singer-songwriter.

== Career ==
She studied classical piano and enrolled at the age of 17 at the art school Studio Herman Teirlinck in Antwerp. In her third year there she made a solo programme with songs of her own, alone at the piano. Shortly after she became known to a moderately wide audience in 1996 when she entered Humo's Rock Rally with a tape of her own version of Gary Numan's Are 'Friends' Electric?. The song ended up on a number of albums, including Random, a Numan tribute album.

After this, Pierlé toured for two years with a theatre group, and starred in a Belgium television series (Moeder, waarom leven wij?), gave a few solo performances and collaborated with DAAU on their song "Broken", where she sings all of the vocals.

== Mud Stories ==
In 1998 she signed a record deal with Warner Music Benelux. This resulted in her first album titled Mud Stories, completely in singer-songwriter fashion. Most of the album was recorded on electric piano in the winter of 1998 and 1999 in the attic of a theatre in Ghent (in some songs, with high quality audio equipment, very faint background car noises can be heard). The extra acoustic piano parts were done in the spring of 1999. This resulted in a range of songs with very little production, essentially Pierlé and her piano, plus an occasional accordion.

The record sold over 25,000 copies in Belgium and the Netherlands.

== Helium Sunset ==
In 2002 An Pierlé released her second record, Helium Sunset. Unlike the previous album, this album was also released outside of the Benelux and France. Most of the songs here were co-written by Koen Gisen.

Following the release of Helium Sunset was a live album named Live Jetset with Orchestra, an album with back up from a full orchestra. The album was first released only as the second CD of the Belgian double release. It was later released as a separate disc, including original artwork. This album was apparently very limited in release numbers and sold out pretty quickly.

2005 saw a new release of Helium Sunset, complete with a new cover featuring An Pierlé (unlike the first releases). In France, a 2-disc version of this was released. The second disc contained the cover "Il est 5 heures (Paris)", which was a moderately successful radio hit in France and Belgium, plus a few live tracks recorded during a radio session in the United Kingdom.

== White Velvet ==
Pierlé and band released the album An Pierlé & White Velvet in early May 2006. Pierlé and the band are now also performing under the same name. As of late April 2006, the first single named "How Does It Feel?" was already available for download in online stores, including two studio live covers. After the release, the follow-up single in the Benelux and France was "Jupiter". 8 April 2007, "It's Got to be Me" was released as a digital single, backed with a French version of the song.

== Discography ==
Studio albums

- Mud Stories (1999)
- Helium Sunset (2002)
- Helium Sunset (Ltd edition) (2005)
- White Velvet (2006) as An Pierlé & White Velvet
- Hinterland (2010) as An Pierlé & White Velvet
- Strange Ways (2013)
- Strange Days (2013)
- Le tout nouveau testament (OST) (2015)
- Slumberland (2015) with Fulco Ottervanger
- Arches (2016)
- Cluster (2017)
- Sylvia (2019) as An Pierlé Quartet
- Wiga Wiga (2021) as An Pierlé Quartet

EPs

- Tower (2000)
- Live Jet Set with Orchestra (2002)

Compilations

- Singles & Rarities + Live in Brussels, Paris & Hamburg (2008)

Singles

- "Mud Stories" (1999)
- "Tower" (2000)
- "As Sudden Tears Fall" (2002)
- "Sing Song Sally" (2002)
- "(Il est 5 heures) Paris s'éveille" (2004)
- "Jupiter" (2006)
- "How Does It Feel" (2006)
- "It's Got To Be Me" (2007)

Film scores

- Eldorado (2008)
- The Brand New Testament (2015)
