= Calvaire (film) =

2004 psychological horror film

- Official theatrical poster
- Directed by: Fabrice Du Welz
- Written by: Fabrice Du Welz; Romain Protat
- Produced by: Michael Gentile; Eddy Géradon-Luyckx; Vincent Tavier
- Starring: Laurent Lucas; Jackie Berroyer; Philippe Nahon
- Cinematography: Benoît Debie
- Edited by: Sabine Hubeaux
- Music by: Vincent Cahay
- Production companies: The Film; La Parti; Tarantula; StudioCanal
- Distributed by: Mars Distribution (France); Lumière (Belgium)
- Release dates: 18 May 2004 (Cannes); 9 March 2005 (Belgium); 16 March 2005 (France)
- Running time: 88 minutes
- Countries: Belgium; France; Luxembourg
- Language: French

Calvaire (lit. Calvary, also known as The Ordeal) is a 2004 French language psychological horror film directed and co-written by Fabrice Du Welz, in his feature directorial debut, starring Laurent Lucas, Philippe Nahon and Jackie Berroyer.

Marc Stevens (Laurent Lucas) is a young traveling singer. After a concert at a nursing home a few days before Christmas, Marc begins traveling to his next destination. Marc's van breaks down in a deserted mountain region where he is taken in by Mr. Bartel (Jackie Berroyer), an innkeeper who is psychologically fragile due to his wife Gloria leaving him.

== Plot ==
Marc Stevens is a struggling low-level performer, who makes his living performing light pop ballads and easy listening tunes at retirement homes. En route to perform at a Christmas special, his van — which doubles as his home — breaks down during a storm and he is stranded deep in the woods. Lost, cold, and succumbing to the elements, Marc is rescued by a local, an emaciated young man named Boris, who takes Marc to a run-down inn.

The sole occupant of the inn is its proprietor, Mr. Bartel, an amiable old man who lives there as a hermit of sorts. Claiming to be a retired standup comedian, Bartel welcomes Marc to stay and offers to repair his van as a token of brotherhood between professional entertainers. Marc accepts the offer, but remains aloof, not speaking with Bartel about his own career or personal life.

The next morning, Mr. Bartel tows Marc's van into the front yard of the inn. Marc tells Bartel he is going for a walk, at which point Bartel suddenly becomes paranoid and aggressive, warning Marc not to go into the nearby village. Marc agrees, but during his walk he approaches a nearby farm, where he witnesses a family voyeuristically watching a teenage boy have intercourse with a calf, calling the experience "so tender". Meanwhile, rather than repairing Marc's van, Bartel snoops through Marc's living quarters and takes his mobile phone and some amateur pornographic photographs presented to Marc by a fan (Brigitte Lahaie).

That night, Bartel becomes even more aggressive, working himself into a frenzy while recalling his adulterous wife Gloria who abandoned him years before. He insists that Marc sing him a song before going to bed. The next day, Marc finds the homemade porn in the inn and realizes Bartel has been going through his things; when he attempts to call for help, he discovers that the telephone Bartel has been regularly using isn't even wired into the wall. Confronting Bartel, Marc discovers him vandalizing the van and pouring petrol over it; Bartel knocks Marc unconscious and blows the van up.

Marc wakes to find himself tied to a chair, clad only in an old dress. Mr. Bartel, now babbling, addresses Marc as if he were his wife, asking why "she" has come back after leaving him. Mr. Bartel sets about shaving one half of Marc's scalp, to "protect" him from the villagers, before forcing him into bed and cuddling next to him.

The next day, Bartel ties Marc to a tractor and takes him out into the woods to chop down a Christmas tree. Marc escapes, but ends up getting caught in a rabbit snare. He lies there prone while darkness falls, until Boris wanders by. Marc begs him for help, but Boris ignores his pleas, addressing Marc as if he were his lost dog. He sits beside Marc and pets and strokes him until the desperate Marc bites his leg, at which he goes away. The next morning, Bartel, alerted by Boris, retrieves Marc, driving him back to the inn covered by a blanket on the back of a hay truck. A pair of villagers see Boris driving the truck with something concealed under a blanket, but they take no action.

Back at the inn, Bartel chastises "Gloria" for running away, then crucifies Marc behind the inn before going into the village to have a drink at the local pub. Seemingly convinced that his wife was a "slut" who was sleeping with every man in town, Bartel warns the men drinking in the bar that now "she" has "returned", none of them can "have her". The men all appear frightened at Bartel's ramblings, but once he leaves, one of the patrons sits at the antique piano and begins to play nightmarishly discordant waltz music. Gradually, the men all get up and begin dancing with one another.

Back at the inn, Bartel brings Marc into the kitchen and they sit down for Christmas dinner. Boris arrives with a calf, convinced that it is his missing dog. Bartel gives a tearful, impassioned speech about love, togetherness, and the spirit of the holidays, before a sudden rifle shot rings out and a bullet explodes through the inn's window, killing Boris. The villagers lay siege to the inn, rushing the inn with a pig on a leash as one would employ a dog, intent on reclaiming the calf, and it quickly becomes apparent that they are also intent on raping Marc, in the shared delusion that Marc is Bartel's returned wife. The villagers mortally wound Bartel before turning their attention to Marc; one of them then briefly rapes Marc on the dining room table.

Shots are fired among the men and in the confusion, Marc manages to escape from the mob and into the forest. He spends the night running from them through the woods, coming across a cemetery with an imposing crucified Christ gravestone, aligning with the Calvaire of the title. Marc manages to elude all but one of the men, who is about to capture "Gloria" when he falls into a bog and starts being swallowed up by the mire. Crying and broken, Marc approaches the drowning man. Instead of using the man's gun against him - or making any attempt to save him - Marc watches as he sinks below the surface. Finally, just before the man's head sinks into the marsh, Marc, as Gloria, responds to his impassioned question by telling him that "she" does, in fact, love him. Within seconds, the villager is dead, and Marc is left alone in the wilderness.

== Cast ==
- Laurent Lucas as Marc Stevens
- Brigitte Lahaie as Mademoiselle Vicky
- Gigi Coursigny as Madame Langhoff
- Jean-Luc Couchard as Boris
- Jackie Berroyer as Bartel
- Philippe Nahon as Robert Orton
- Philippe Grand'Henry as Tomas Orton
- Jo Prestia as Fermier Mylène
- Marc Lefebvre as Lucien
- Alfred David-Pingouin as Roland
- Alain Delaunois as Gáant
- Vincent Cahay as Stan le Pianiste
- Johan Meys as Rosto

== Release ==
It premiered on 18 May 2004 as part of the Cannes Film Festival. it was also screened at the Edinburgh Film Festival in 2004. It had its US release on August 25, 2006. Its official English title was The Ordeal, but most reviewers have still referred to it as Calvaire.

DVD release "A Wonderful Love", a short film also directed by Fabrice Du Welz. The American DVD is subtitled "The Ordeal".

== Reception ==
The film has received mixed and divided reviews from critics. Peter Bradshaw from The Guardian awarded the film 4 out of a possible 5 stars, calling it "A brilliant black comic nightmare". While, Marc Savlov from the Austin Chronicle awarded the film a negative 1 1/2 out of 5 stars, stating, "Calvaire has a few passages of genuine dread – a barroom dance by the local villagers is just plain disturbing – but it takes so long to get going and fails to generate the necessary suspense to keep viewers engaged, that the horrific final act is too little, too late, while at the same time nearly being much too much". J.R. Jones from Chicago Reader gave the film a positive review, complimenting the film's thematic complexity and diabolical humor. Roberto Curti of offscreen.com in 2005 stated "the main problem with Calvaire is the passive, unsympathetic nature of its main character" and "Du Welz has a keen eye for composition", and "injects weird elements into the story".

On the review aggregator website Rotten Tomatoes, 47% of 32 critics' reviews are positive, with an average rating of 5.7/10. The website's consensus reads: "Calvaire (The Ordeal) has a certain amount of grim potential, but loses effectiveness by too often mistaking disturbing gore for genuine horror." On Metacritic, the film has a more positive score of 52 based on 12 reviews.

== Production ==
Originally, the idea was to portray two male characters, one of whom would mistake the other one for his wife, it took three years for the script to develop from the original idea of Fabrice du Welz. The film was shot in Belgium's Hautes Fagnes natural reserve and in the village of Bullange. Filming also took place in Mondorf-les-Bains, Luxembourg.

== Awards ==
Amsterdam Fantastic Film Festival

- Grand Prize of European Fantasy Film in Silver

Gérardmer Film Festival 2005

- International Critics Award
- Premiere Award
- Special Jury Prize
