= Wim Willaert =

Belgian actor

Wim Willaert (born 19 March 1967) is a Belgian actor. He is best known for his performance as Frank Welvaert in the TV series Eigen Kweek.

== Selected filmography ==
Film
Year	Title	Role	Notes
2004	When the Sea Rises		
2007	Ex Drummer	Jimmy	
2010	22nd of May	Wim	
2013	Marina	Music teacher	
2015	I'm Dead but I Have Friends		Magritte Award for Best Actor
2015	Cafard		voice only
2016	Flemish Heaven		
2018	This Magnificent Cake!	Van Molle	voice only
2020	The Claus Family		
2022	On the Edge		
2022	House of Lust	Doctor	

TV
Year	Title	Role	Notes
2013-2019	Eigen Kweek	Frank Welvaert	
2017-2018	The Tunnel	Jacques Moreau	
2019	Undercover		
