= Cold Moon (1991 film) =

1991 film

- A poster with the film's French title: Lune froide
- Directed by: Patrick Bouchitey
- Written by: Jackie Berroyer; Patrick Bouchitey; Charles Bukowski
- Produced by: Luc Besson; Andrée Martinez
- Starring: Jean-François Stévenin
- Cinematography: Jean-Jacques Bouhon
- Edited by: Florence Bon
- Distributed by: Gaumont Distribution
- Release date: 22 May 1991
- Running time: 92 minutes
- Country: France
- Language: French
- Box office: $1.4 million

Cold Moon (French: Lune froide) is a 1991 French drama film directed by Patrick Bouchitey. It was entered into the 1991 Cannes Film Festival. It is adapted from Bouchitey's 1988 short film of the same name, which won the César Award for Best Fiction Short Film in 1990. It is based on the Charles Bukowski short stories "The Copulating Mermaid of Venice" and "Trouble with the Battery".

== Cast ==
- Jean-François Stévenin as Simon
- Patrick Bouchitey as Dédé
- Jean-Pierre Bisson as Gérard, le beau-frère de Dédé
- Jackie Berroyer as The monk
- Consuelo De Haviland as La blonde / Blonde girl
- Laura Favali as Nadine, la soeur de Dédé
- Jean-Pierre Castaldi as Félix
- Silvana de Faria as La prostituée / Whore
- Karine Nuris as La sirène
- Roland Blanche as L'accoudé
- Dominique Maurin as Le vagabond (as Dominique Collignon Maurin)
- Bernard Crombey as Le boucher
- Patrick Fierry as Jean-Loup
- Anne Macina as La femme de la voiture
- Marie Mergey as Suzanne, la tante de Simon / Aunt Suzanne
