= Inexorable (film) =

- Theatrical release poster
- Directed by: Fabrice du Welz
- Written by: Joséphine Darcy Hopkins; Aurélien Molas; Fabrice du Welz
- Produced by: Jean-Yves Roubin; Cassandre Warnauts
- Starring: Benoît Poelvoorde; Mélanie Doutey; Alba Gaïa Bellugi; Janaïna Halloy Fokan; Jackie Berroyer; Anaël Snoek
- Cinematography: Manuel Dacosse
- Edited by: Anne-Laure Guégan
- Music by: Vincent Cahay
- Production companies: Frakas Productions; The Jokers Films
- Distributed by: Les Bookmakers
- Release dates: 7 September 2021 (Deauville); 6 April 2022 (France)
- Running time: 98 minutes
- Countries: Belgium; France
- Language: French
- Box office: $160,156

Inexorable is a 2021 Belgian-French thriller film written by Joséphine Darcy Hopkins and Fabrice du Welz, who is also the director. The film stars Benoît Poelvoorde, Alba Gaïa Bellugi, Mélanie Doutey, Jackie Berroyer and Anaël Snoek. The film premiered at the 47th Deauville Film Festival on 7 September 2021. It was theatrically released in France on 6 April 2022.

== Cast ==
- Benoît Poelvoorde as Marcel Bellmer
- Mélanie Doutey as Jeanne Drahi Bellmer
- Alba Gaïa Bellugi as Gloria Bartel
- Janaïna Halloy Fokan as Lucie Drahi Bellmer
- Jackie Berroyer as Le taulier
- Anaël Snoek as Paola

== Reception ==
Review aggregator website Rotten Tomatoes reported that 73% of 15 reviews of the film were positive.
