= Patrick Bouchitey =

French actor (born 1946)

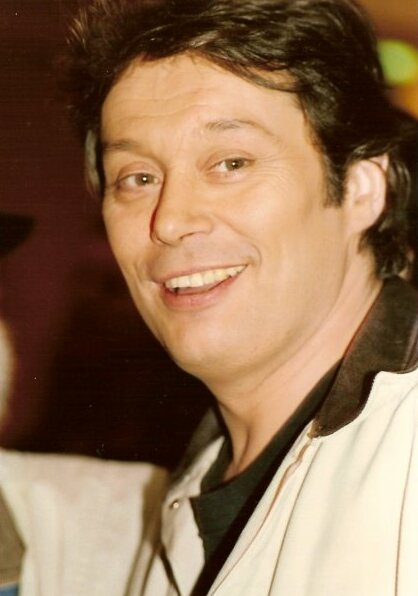
- Patrick Bouchitey at the 1991 Cannes Film Festival.
- Born: 11 August 1946 (age 79); Plancher-les-Mines, France
- Occupations: Actor, film director
- Years active: 1972–present

Patrick Bouchitey (born 11 August 1946) is a French actor and film director. He has appeared in over 80 films and television shows since 1972. His film Cold Moon was entered into the 1991 Cannes Film Festival.

== Selected filmography ==
- La Meilleure façon de marcher (1976)
- Cold Moon (1991 - directed)
- 1, 2, 3, Sun (1993)
- Neuf mois (1994)
- Beaumarchais (1996)
- Que la lumière soit (1998)
- Les Naufragés de la D17 (2002) - Paul Braud, le pilote
- Corto Maltese, la cour secrète des arcanes (2002) - Raspoutine (voice)
- Imposture (2005) - Serge Pommier
- Les Rois maudits (2005, TV Mini-Series) - Maître Evrard
- Les Aiguilles rouges (2006) - Le père d'Eric
- Max & Co (2007) - Rodolfo (voice)
- Tricheuse (2009) - Lavoisier
- My Afternoons with Margueritte (2010) - Landremont
- Moi, Michel G., milliardaire, maître du monde (2011) - Charles Prévost
- Sea, No Sex and Sun (2012) - Serge
- Edmond Was a Donkey (2012)
- L'Oncle Charles (2012) - Pierre, le voisin
- Victor Young Perez (2013) - Léon Bellières
- Les Têtes de l'emploi (2016) - Le père de Stéphane
- Capitaine Marleau (2017, TV Series) - Hugo Perez
- À nos pères (2018)
- The Five Devils (2022) - Jean-Yvon
