= I'm Dead but I Have Friends =

2015 French-Belgian comedy film

I'm Dead But I Have Friends
- Theatrical release poster
- Directed by: Guillaume Malandrin; Stéphane Malandrin
- Written by: Guillaume Malandrin; Stéphane Malandrin; Vincent Tavier (collaboration)
- Produced by: Jacques-Henri Bronckart; Olivier Bronckart
- Starring: Bouli Lanners; Wim Willaert
- Cinematography: Hugues Poulain
- Edited by: Yannick Leroy
- Distributed by: O'Brother Distribution (Belgium); Happiness Distribution (France)
- Release date: 17 June 2015
- Running time: 96 minutes
- Countries: Belgium; France
- Language: French
- Budget: $2 million

I'm Dead But I Have Friends (French: Je suis mort mais j'ai des amis) is a 2015 French-Belgian comedy film written and directed by brothers Guillaume and Stéphane Malandrin. It was filmed in Brussels and Liège in Belgium and Schefferville, in Quebec, Canada. The film was nominated for seven Magritte Awards, including Best Film. The film was nominated for the César Award for Best Foreign Film at the 41st César Awards.

== Cast ==
- Bouli Lanners as Yvan
- Wim Willaert as Wim
- Serge Riaboukine as Pierre
- Eddy Leduc as Nico
- Lyes Salem as Dany
- Jacky Lambert as Jipé
- Rosario Amedeo as Van Beek
