= Alleluia (2014 film) =

2014 film

- Film poster
- Directed by: Fabrice Du Welz
- Written by: Fabrice Du Welz; Vincent Tavier
- Starring: Lola Dueñas; Laurent Lucas; Helena Noguerra; Edith Lemeroy; Anne-Marie Loop; Pili Groyne; Stéphane Bissot; David Murgia; Sorenza Mollica
- Release dates: 22 May 2014 (Cannes); 26 November 2014 (France)
- Countries: Belgium; France
- Language: French

Alleluia (French: Alléluia) is a 2014 Belgian-French horror-drama film directed by Fabrice Du Welz. It was screened as part of the Directors' Fortnight section at the 2014 Cannes Film Festival. It received eight nominations at the 6th Magritte Awards, including Best Director for Du Welz.

== Plot ==
Gloria, a single mother and morgue worker, lives in a small apartment with her daughter. She has been reluctant to date, but signs up for an online dating service at her friend's urging. Gloria's first date with charming shoe salesman Michel goes well, and they have sex at her apartment that night.

Some time later, Michel has become a fixture in Gloria's life and he gets along well with her daughter. Gloria agrees to loan him money for a business emergency, but she falls into a deep depression after he disappears with the cash. She finds him at a nightclub flirting with other women and confronts him before he can take one of them home. At his place, Gloria sees photos of his previous victims, including a photo of herself. Michel explains he was sexually abused by his mother, and he now uses his sexuality to seduce women and con them out of their money. Gloria craves the thrill of his lifestyle and agrees to help him, leaving her daughter with a friend.

Michel marries Marguerite, his new victim, with Gloria posing as his recently divorced sister. The three of them cohabit but Gloria becomes increasingly jealous and possessive over Michel and Marguerite's intimacy. Michel turns down Gloria's advances, saying it's too risky for them to be caught together. Gloria witnesses Marguerite performing fellatio on Michel, and Gloria kills Marguerite in a fit of rage. Gloria kills another one of Michel's victims after watching them have sex, and Gloria and Michel marry each other in an unofficial ceremony.

Michel's next victim, Solange, lives on a remote farmhouse with her daughter. Solange confides in Gloria and says that she's pregnant with Michel's baby, even though Michel promised not to be physically intimate with any more victims. Furious, Gloria gives Michel a hatchet and forces him to kill Solange. Solange's daughter witnesses the murder and flees in fear. Gloria attempts to kill the daughter but Michel intervenes. Gloria becomes furious with Michel after he stops her from killing Solange's daughter. In a fit of rage, she turns on Michel and tries to drown him in the lake. Afterwards, she leaves him there and walks back home, then calls her daughter and tells her she loves her. She collects her clothes and notices the medication. Later, Michel and Gloria bathe each other, suggesting a moment of reconciliation. They then get dressed carefully and elegantly, just as they did at the beginning of the film separately. Then they go to the cinema together. As they sit in their seats, Michel notice people with flashlights walking through the theater—likely ushers, but their presence evokes the sense that Michel is being hunted for the murders. Michel looks at them uneasily, then turns his head forward again, staring straight ahead in tense silence.

== Cast ==
- Lola Dueñas as Gloria
- Helena Noguerra as Solange
- Laurent Lucas as Michel
- Stéphane Bissot as Madeleine
- David Murgia as Father Luis

== Reception ==
On the review aggregator website Rotten Tomatoes, 83% of 35 critics' reviews are positive. Metacritic, which uses a weighted average, assigned the film a score of 72 out of 100, based on 12 critics, indicating "generally favorable" reviews.
