= Fabrice Du Welz =

Belgian film director and screenwriter

Fabrice du Welz
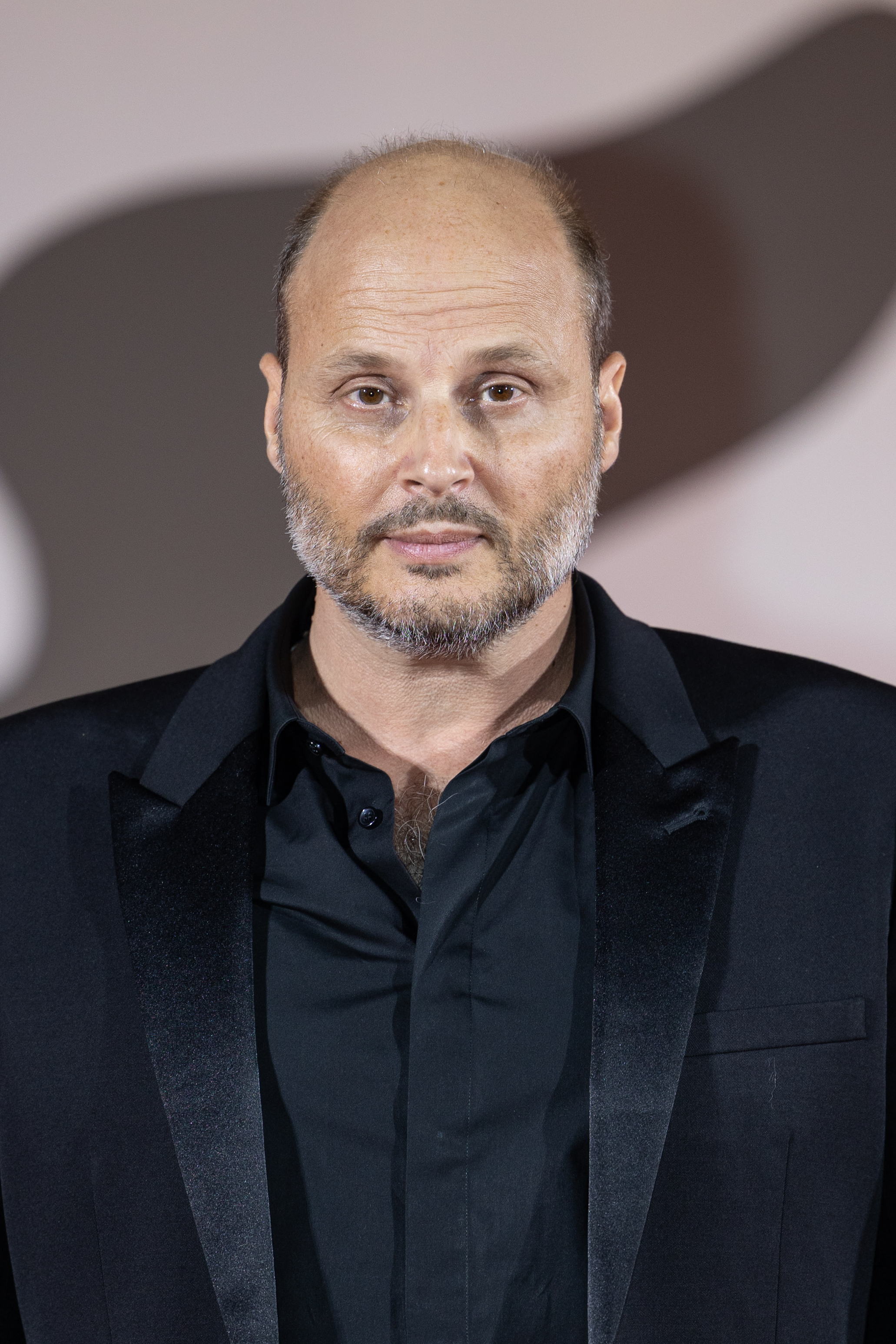
- Du Welz in 2024
- Born: 21 October 1972 (age 53); Belgium
- Occupations: Film director Screenwriter
- Years active: 1997–present

Fabrice Du Welz (born 21 October 1972 in Belgium) is a Belgian film director and screenwriter. He has directed several films including Calvaire in 2004, Vinyan in 2008 and Message from the King in 2016.

== Career ==
Fabrice du Welz, born 21 October 1972. Initially he was a student at a Jesuit school. Before he studied at the Dramatic Arts Conservatory of Liège (Belgium) then and then a year at the INSAS, the cinema training institute of Brussels. Starting in 1990, he directed a number of films in Super 8. After his studies, he collaborated on comedy sketches for Canal+, "La Grande Famille", "Nulle Part Ailleurs". In 1999, he directed the short film Quand on Est Amoureux C'est Merveilleux, which won the Grand Prize of the Gerardmer Festival in 2001.

In 1999, he directed the short film A Wonderful Love that won the Grand Prize of the Festival of Gerardmer. Aged 25, in 2004 he directed his first feature film, Calvaire starring Laurent Lucas and Jackie Berroyer which was selected in Critics' Week of the Cannes Film Festival 2005. In 2007, he directed Vinyan with Emmanuelle Béart and Rufus Sewell in Thailand and selected in official competition at the Venice Film Festival in 2008.

In 2012, he directed Colt 45, from a screenplay by Fathi Beddiar starring Gérard Lanvin and Joeystarr, produced by Thomas Langmann that ultimately failed to deliver in the budget, forcing the director to delete important scenes that were too expensive. Moreover, the two stars refused to come back on the set as Du Welz would be there too. He stated "It almost ruined me" and that the set became "a toxic environment". Fabrice du Welz and Fathi Beddiar, later decided not to support the film when it was released in August 2014.

In 2013, he directed Alleluia, a free adaptation of the news story immortalized in 1970 by the film The Honeymoon Killers starring Laurent Lucas and Lola Dueñas. The film was selected for the Directors' Fortnight at the 2014 Cannes Film Festival.

In 2015, he directed Message from the King produced by David Lancaster (Drive, Whiplash, Nightcrawler) and Stephen Cornwell (A Most Wanted Man) in Los Angeles starring Chadwick Boseman, Luke Evans, Teresa Palmer, Alfred Molina and Natalie Martinez. The film premiered on 8 September 2016 at the 2016 Toronto International Film Festival. His next film, Adoration, was released in 2019 to critical acclaim. It received the André Cavens Award for Best Film by the Belgian Film Critics Association (UCC). At the 11th Magritte Awards, Adoration was nominated for six awards, including Best Film and Best Screenplay for Du Welz.

== Filmography ==
Year	Title	Credited as		Notes
Year	Title	Director	Screenwriter	Notes
1997	Folles aventures de Thierry Van Hoost	Yes		Short
1999	Quand on est amoureux, c'est merveilleux (A Wonderful Love)	Yes	Yes	Short
2004	Calvaire (The Ordeal)	Yes	Yes	
2008	Vinyan	Yes	Yes	
2014	Alleluia	Yes	Yes	
2014	Colt 45	Yes	Yes	
2016	Message from the King	Yes	No	
2018	Des cowboys et des indiens : Le Cinéma de Patar et Aubier	Yes	Yes	TV documentary
2019	Adoration	Yes	Yes	
2021	Inexorable	Yes	Yes	
2024	The Passion According to Béatrice	Yes	Yes	Docufiction
2024	Maldoror	Yes	Yes	
