= Steve Willaert =

Belgian composer, arranger, musician and producer

- Origin: Belgium
- Genres: Film scores, classic, pop, jazz, folk, experimental
- Occupations: Composer, musician, conductor, producer
- Instruments: guitar, keyboards, piano, synthesizer
- Years active: 1985–present

Steve Willaert is a Belgian composer, arranger, musician and producer.

== Biography ==
Since the eighties, Steve Willaert composed music for Belgian radio and television-shows. In 1993 he released a solo album called Musical Regards. He wrote the score for the French movie Le Golden Boy (1996). A year later, he did the orchestrations and arrangements for the movie When The Light Comes (1997) by director Stijn Coninx (Daens).

In his home country, he regularly is musical director of great television shows. Since 2001, he is VTM's musical director for their annual Christmas Parade. In 2003 he did orchestrations for 50 years TV, Eurosong live on stage in the Sportpalais Antwerp organized by the national broadcast (VRT). He toured as musical director and arranger with the Belgian artists Will Tura, Jo Lemaire, Axelle Red and Nathalia.

He did arrangements for major orchestras, including the London Philharmonic Orchestra, the National Orchestra of Belgium, the Beethoven Academy, Philharmonic orchestra of Prague and the Flemish Radio Orchestra (VRO). By his experience with these orchestras and the use of acoustic, electronic instruments and computers, Willaert had the opportunity to collaborate with international artists such as Françoise Hardy, Johnny Logan, Toots Thielemans, Zucchero, Youssou N'Dour, Ozark Henry, Leo Sayer and Helmut Lotti.

Recently, he is more and more active as a film score composer. He wrote music for the TV-series Stille Waters, Aspe, Thuis and Katarakt. In 2003 Willaert won for his score to Stille Waters the Prix Italia and Plateauprijs.

Meanwhile, he kept composing for film: Frank Van Mechelen's Indringer (2005) and De Hel van Tanger (2006), as well as, Vermist (2007) by director Jan Verheyen (for which he also write the track Waiting with Michael Leahy) and the Dutch movie Dunja en Desie in Marokko (2008) by Dana Nechushtan, and the Belgian films The Verdict (2013) and Belgian Rhapsody (2015).

== Selected works ==
=== Music for film, series, theatre and musicals ===
- Zoon van de Schrijnwerker (with Will Tura) (1988) (Theatre)
- Le Golden Boy (1996) (French movie)
- Stille Waters (TV-episode) (2002) Best sold Belgian soundtrack, Prix Italia
- Aspe 1 (TV-episodes) (2003–2004) based on the books of Pieter Aspe
- Halleluja (sitcom) (2005)
- De Indringer (2005) by Frank Van Mechelen
- Halleluja 2 (2006)
- Aspe 2 (2006)
- Elisabeth (TV-serie) (2006)
- De Hel van Tanger (2006) by Frank Van Mechelen
- Thuis (TV-soap) (2007)
- Aspe 3 (2007)
- Katarakt (TV-serie) (2007)
- Vermist by Jan Verheyen (2007)
- Dunja en Desie in Marokko (2008)
- Salamander (2011)
- Belgian Rhapsody (2014)
- Memory Lane (2024)
- Miss Moxy (2026)

=== Arrangements ===
Musicals, movies, projects

- Night of the Proms (1993)
- Les Nuits Fantastiques (1993)
- Extasy-the opera (1995) in Wenen
- When The Light Comes (1997) by Stijn Coninx
- Musicals by Studio 100

Sneeuwwitje (1999)
Assepoester (1999)
Pinokkio (2000)
Robin Hood (2001)
Doornroosje (2002)
3 biggetjes (2003)
De Kleine Zeemeermin (2004)

- Kuifje en de zonnetempel (2001)
- Fishboy by Laurent Michelet (2005)
- Story of Us by Sandrine and "Opening Theme" for the soundtrack "Windkracht 10-koksijde rescue" (2007) by Hans Herbots
- Songs in the Key of Love, project by singer Sofie and the Beethoven Academie with conductor Dirk Brossé.
- Dank U Vlaanderen, project by Will Tura and the Flemish Radio Orchestra
- Nekka 2000

Albums

- Love album by Gunther Neefs (1998)
- Ik Voel Me Goed by Gunther Neefs (2000) (award of best Flemish production 2000)
- Louis Neefs, 20 years later (2000) (platinum award)
- En Dans by Clouseau (2002) (platinum award)
- Swing Is The Thing by Gunther Neefs (2002)
- Jo prend la mer by Jo Lemaire (2003)

=== Productions ===
- All studio/live- albums and singles by Will Tura from 1987–present (20 golden and platinum awards)
- Soundtrack Stille Waters (2001)
- A Moment (2002), full album by Severine Dore
- Songs by Natalia for the soundtrack Team Spirit II (2003) by Jan Verheyen
- This Time (2003), full album by Natalia (platinum award)
- I've only begun to fight (2004), single by Natalia (golden award)
- Higher Than The Sun (2004), single by Natalia (co-production with Vincent Pierins)
- Soundtrack Aspe (2004) with single "Wees van mij" by Gene Thomas
- Back for more (2004) by Natalia (double platinum) and singles "Sisters are doin it for themselves" (2005) and "Rid of You" (2006).
