= Vortex (2021 film) =

2021 film

- French theatrical release poster
- Directed by: Gaspar Noé
- Written by: Gaspar Noé
- Produced by: Edouard Weil; Vincent Maraval; Brahim Chioua
- Starring: Dario Argento; Françoise Lebrun; Alex Lutz
- Cinematography: Benoît Debie
- Edited by: Denis Bedlow
- Production companies: Rectangle Productions; Les Cinémas de la Zone; KNM; Artémis Productions; Srab Films; Les Films Velvet; Kallouche Cinéma; Shelter Prod
- Distributed by: Wild Bunch (France)
- Release dates: 16 July 2021 (Cannes); 13 April 2022 (France)
- Running time: 142 minutes
- Countries: France; Belgium; Monaco
- Language: French
- Box office: $278,472

Vortex is a 2021 avant-garde psychological drama film written and directed by Gaspar Noé. It stars Dario Argento as a father and author, in his first leading role, alongside Françoise Lebrun as his wife, and Alex Lutz as their son, Stéphane. The film deals with the themes of the human condition and personal problems, uses a slow, minimal cinematic approach: a pockmarked, faded palette of the frame, deaf voices, and the use of low-frequency background sound.

The film premiered in the Cannes Premiere section at the 2021 Cannes Film Festival, to widespread acclaim from film critics, a departure from Noé's previous films which had received divisive receptions. Praise was given in particular for Noé's direction, Argento and Lebrun's performances, the film’s emotional power, scope, ambition and execution. This marked Noé's professional and creative shift from extremity to the slow cinema genre, with the use of realistic character drama.

== Plot ==
The film tells the story of an old married couple, a distinguished author and a retired psychiatrist, living in an apartment. The couple, due to age and ill health, primarily his heart condition and her dementia, begin to drift further apart from each other and gradually lose contact with reality, as reflected in the film screen splitting into two separate ones between them. The husband, reluctant to disclose information about his wife's condition, tries to focus on finishing another book about the cinema and dreams, despite his own frail condition.

The couple's son Stéphane, who lives separately with his son Kiki, has a history of drug abuse and is struggling himself. He begs his parents to move to supervised housing with caretakers for her, but the husband does not want to sell their apartment, as he is afraid to lose his books and objects reminding him of the past.

The husband's condition deteriorates slowly: he has a heart attack and collapses. In the morning, the wife finds him lying on the floor and at first does not know what to do, but then calls Stéphane. The husband is brought to the hospital and ultimately dies. After the husband's death, the split screens change accordingly. Stéphane becomes emotional and curls up on his mother's lap. Back in the apartment, the wife wanders helplessly through the hallway of her home. Stéphane begins to use drugs again while his mother takes out all the medication pills in the bathroom and tries to flush them down the toilet.

The wife dies peacefully in bed, though it is implied she might have died from gas poisoning after turning on her kitchen stove before going to bed. At her funeral, Stéphane describes the last months of caring for the couple, after which a slide show is shown of moments from his mother's life. Looking at the wall of urns where the wife's ashes are placed, Kiki asks whether his grandparents have a new home now; Stéphane tells his son that homes are for the living. At the end of the film, the apartment is shown in still images, increasingly emptied of the couple's possessions until the apartment is completely vacant. The final image consists of the mourning photos of the husband (1940-2020) and wife (1944-2020), taken when they were much younger.

== Cast ==
- Dario Argento as Lui
- Françoise Lebrun as Elle
- Alex Lutz as Stéphane
- Kylian Dheret as Kiki
- Kamel Benchemekh as the grocer
- Corinne Bruand as Claire
- Eric Fourneuf as the caregiver

== Production ==
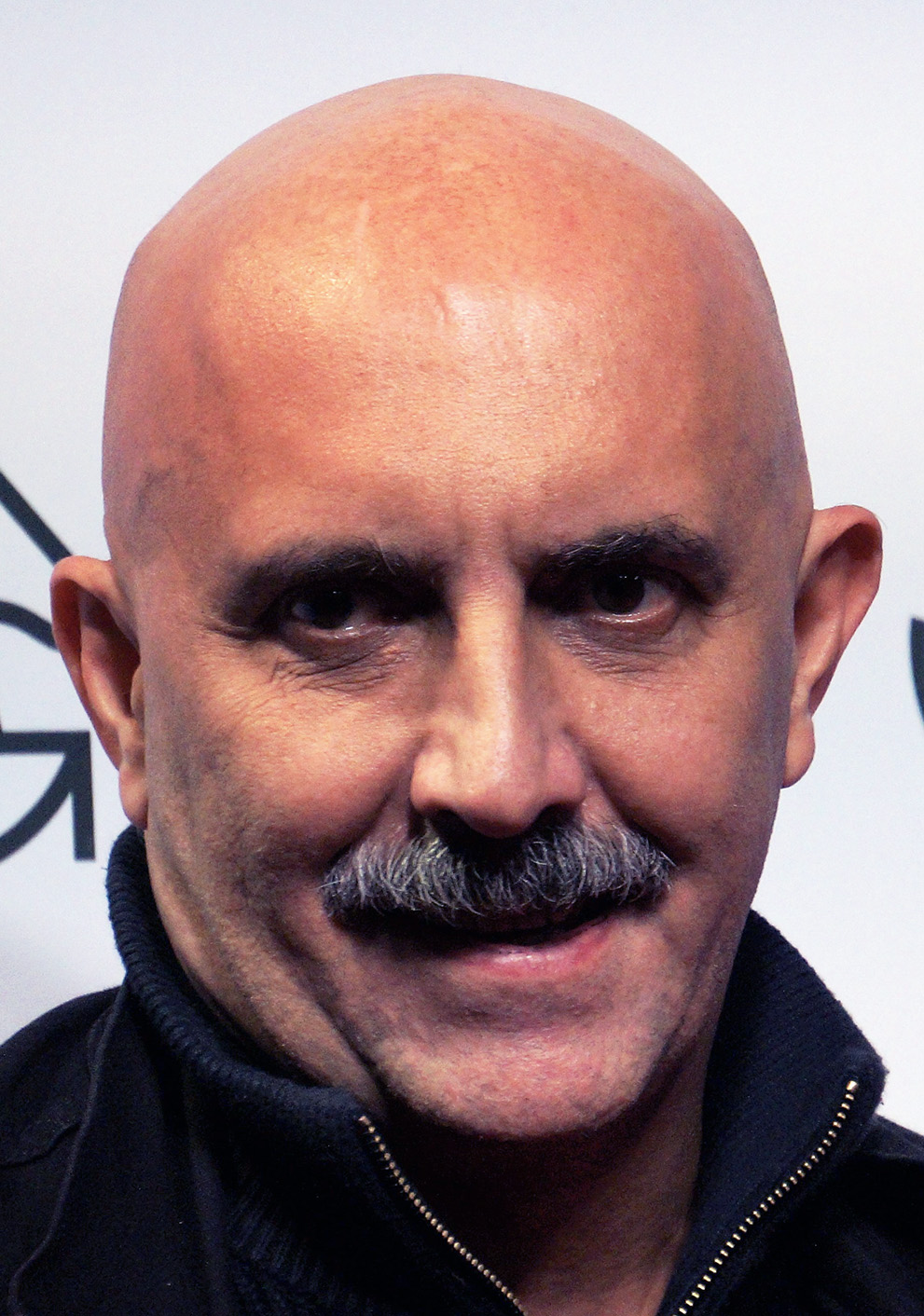
Noe drew inspirations from his mother's dementia for the film.

Vortex was conceived after some of the inspiration for the film came from Noé's experiences dealing with his mother’s dementia, as well as Noé being diagnosed with a brain hemorrhage that almost killed him in early 2020. In his first leading role, Argento, who lives in Italy, learned to speak in fluent but heavily accented French, sometimes pausing and fumbling to find the right word. Noé persuaded Argento to play the role by showing him his film Love, which contains plenty of unsimulated sex scenes. Argento was shocked and thought Noé was asking him for a movie. However, he agreed to join the next film after hearing about the idea for the film.

The film uses both split-screen and medium format, much like his previous film Lux Æterna (2019). The film was completed in post-production at an exceptionally fast pace; Noé began working on the script in February, filming took place set in northeast Paris, near the Stalingrad Station, between April and May, and the film was ready in July 2021. The dialogue in the film is completely improvised despite using the screenplay from Noe; the screen is divided into two parts between the couple.

== Release ==
In August 2021, the film sold to Utopia for US distribution. It was released at the IFC Center on 29 April 2022, followed by an expansion to the rest of the US on 6 May 2022.

== Reception ==
The review aggregator website Rotten Tomatoes calculated a 92% approval rating from 92 reviews, with an average rating of 8.3/10. The website's consensus reads, "Vortex is Gaspar Noé at his most unflinchingly pitiless—but viewers who can make it through will be rewarded with a haunting contemplation of death." On Metacritic, the film has a weighted average score of 82 out of 100 from 29 critic reviews, indicating “universal acclaim”. It holds the highest-rated critic scores for Gaspar Noé's films on both Rotten Tomatoes and Metacritic.

Justin Chang, a top critic of the Los Angeles Times, praised the film and noted: "It’s a bone-deep sensory immersion that never feels merely sensationalist, anchored by two performances of astonishing commitment and emotional power." Glenn Kenny of RogerEbert.com gave a perfect four out of four stars and noted: "One leaves Vortex feeling cleansed by fire."

== Awards ==
Year	Award	Category	Result
2022	Dublin International Film Festival	Best Film	Won
2022	San Sebastián International Film Festival	Zabaltegi-Tabakalera Prize	Won
2022	Film Fest Gent	Best Film	Won
2022	International Istanbul Film Festival	Golden Tulip	Won
2023	Belgian Film Critics Association	Grand Prix	Won
