= List of foreign films and TV series set in Japan =

The following is a list of foreign films and television series set in Japan. Japan has provided an exotic and cosmopolitan backdrop to many international films set partially, mostly or entirely in Japan.

== Film ==
=== Pre-1940 ===
- The Secret Game (1917) — directed by William C. de Mille, starring Sessue Hayakawa
- The Dragon Painter (1919) — directed by William Worthington, starring Sessue Hayakawa
- The Sea Wolf (1930) — directed by Alfred Santell, starring Milton Sills
- Yoshiwara (1937) — directed by Max Ophüls

=== 1940–1949 ===
- Bombardier (1943) — directed by Richard Wallace, starring Pat O'Brien
- Jack London (1943) — directed by Alfred Santell, starring Michael O'Shea
- Destination Tokyo (1943) — directed by Delmer Daves, starring Cary Grant and John Garfield
- Thirty Seconds Over Tokyo (1944) — directed by Mervyn LeRoy, starring Van Johnson and Robert Walker
- Blood on the Sun (1945) — directed by Frank Lloyd, starring James Cagney and Sylvia Sidney
- Sands of Iwo Jima (1949) — directed by Allan Dwan, starring John Wayne and John Agar
- Tokyo Joe (1949) — directed by Stuart Heisler, starring Humphrey Bogart and Alexander Knox

=== 1950–1959 ===
- Tokyo File 212 (1951) — directed by Dorrell McGowan and Stuart E. McGowan
- Oriental Evil (1951) — directed by George P. Breakston
- Geisha Girl (1952) — directed by George Breakston and C. Ray Stahl, starring Steve Forrest
- Back at the Front (1952) — directed by George Sherman, starring Tom Ewell and Harvey Lembeck
- House of Bamboo (1955) — directed by Samuel Fuller, starring Robert Ryan and Robert Stack
- Around the World in Eighty Days (1956) — directed by Michael Anderson, starring David Niven and Cantinflas
- Navy Wife (1956) — directed by Edward Bernds
- The Teahouse of the August Moon (1956) — directed by Daniel Mann, starring Marlon Brando and Glenn Ford
- Escapade in Japan (1957) — directed by Arthur Lubin, starring Cameron Mitchell and Jon Provost
- Stopover Tokyo (1957) — directed by Richard L. Breen, starring Robert Wagner and Joan Collins
- Sayonara (1957) — directed by Joshua Logan, starring Marlon Brando and Miiko Taka
- Typhoon Over Nagasaki (1957) — directed by Yves Ciampi, starring Jean Marais and Danielle Darrieux
- Joe Butterfly (1957) — directed by Jesse Hibbs, starring Audie Murphy and Burgess Meredith
- The Barbarian and the Geisha (1958) — directed by John Huston, starring John Wayne and Eiko Ando
- The Geisha Boy (1958) — directed by Frank Tashlin, starring Jerry Lewis and Marie McDonald
- Hiroshima mon amour (1959) — directed by Alain Resnais, starring Emmanuelle Riva and Eiji Okada

=== 1960–1969 ===
- My Geisha (1962) — directed by Jack Cardiff, starring Shirley MacLaine and Yves Montand
- Atout coeur à Tokyo pour OSS 117 (1966) — directed by Michel Boisrond, starring Frederick Stafford and Marina Vlady
- Love in Tokyo (1966) — directed by Pramod Chakravorty, starring Joy Mukherjee and Asha Parekh
- Walk Don't Run (1966) — directed by Charles Walters, starring Cary Grant, Samantha Eggar, Jim Hutton
- You Only Live Twice (1967) — directed by Lewis Gilbert, starring Sean Connery and Akiko Wakabayashi
- Nobody's Perfect (1968) — directed by Alan Rafkin

=== 1970–1979 ===
- Tora! Tora! Tora! (1970) — directed by Richard Fleischer and Kinji Fukasaku, starring Martin Balsam and Soh Yamamura
- The Yakuza (1974) — directed by Sydney Pollack, starring Robert Mitchum and Ken Takakura
- Mastermind (1976) — directed by Alex March, starring Zero Mostel and Keiko Kishi
- Seven Nights in Japan (1976) — directed by Lewis Gilbert, starring Michael York and Hidemi Aoki
- The Bad News Bears Go to Japan (1978) — directed by John Berry, starring Tony Curtis and Jackie Earle Haley

=== 1980–1989 ===
- Bushido Blade (1981) — directed by Shusei Kotani, starring Timothy Patrick Murphy and Frank Converse
- The Challenge (1982) — directed by John Frankenheimer, starring Scott Glenn and Toshirō Mifune
- Japanil Kalyanaraman (1985) — directed by S.P. Muthuraman, starring Kamal Haasan and Radha
- Mishima: A Life in Four Chapters (1985) — directed by Paul Schrader, starring Ken Ogata and Masayuki Shionoya
- The Karate Kid 2 (1986) — directed by John Avildsen, starring Ralph Macchio and Pat Morita
- Gung Ho (1986) — directed by Ron Howard, starring Michael Keaton
- Tokyo Pop (1988) — directed by Fran Rubel Kuzui, starring Carrie Hamilton and Diamond Yukai
- Kinjite: Forbidden Subjects (1989) — directed by J. Lee Thompson, starring Charles Bronson and Perry Lopez
- Black Rain (1989) — directed by Ridley Scott, starring Michael Douglas and Ken Takakura

=== 1990–1999 ===
- American Samurai (1992) — directed by Sam Firstenberg, starring David Bradley and Mark Dacascos
- Mr. Baseball (1992) — directed by Fred Schepisi, starring Tom Selleck and Ken Takakura
- Teenage Mutant Ninja Turtles III (1993) — directed by Stuart Gillard, starring Elias Koteas and Paige Turco
- 3 Ninjas: Kick Back (1994) — directed by Charles T. Ganganis, starring Victor Wong and Max Elliot Slade
- The Hunted (1995) — directed by J.F. Lawton, starring Christopher Lambert
- Cold Fever (1995) — directed by Friðrik Þór Friðriksson, starring Masatoshi Nagase and Lili Taylor
- Madame Butterfly (1995) — directed by Frédéric Mitterrand, starring Ying Huang and Richard Troxell
- Tokyo Eyes (1998) — directed by Jean-Pierre Limosin, starring Shinji Takeda and Hinano Yoshikawa
- Enlightenment Guaranteed (1999) — directed by Doris Dörrie, starring Uwe Ochsenknecht

=== 2000–2009 ===
- Okinawa Rendez-vous (2000) — directed by Gordon Chan
- Enlightenment Guaranteed (2000) — directed by Doris Dörrie, starring Uwe Ochsenknecht and Gustav-Peter Wöhler
- Pearl Harbor (2001) — directed by Michael Bay, starring Ben Affleck and Josh Hartnett
- Wasabi (2001) — directed by Gérard Krawczyk, starring Jean Reno and Ryōko Hirosue
- Austin Powers in Goldmember (2002) — directed by Jay Roach, starring Mike Myers and Beyoncé Knowles
- 2009: Lost Memories (2002) — directed by Lee Si-myung, starring Jang Dong-gun and Tōru Nakamura
- Fear and Trembling (2003) — directed by Alain Corneau, starring Sylvie Testud and Kaori Tsuji
- The Last Samurai (2003) — directed by Edward Zwick, starring Tom Cruise and Ken Watanabe
- Kill Bill vol. 1 (2003) — directed by Quentin Tarantino, starring Uma Thurman and Lucy Liu
- The Animatrix (Program) (2003) — directed by Yoshiaki Kawajiri
- Lost in Translation (2003) — directed by Sofia Coppola, starring Bill Murray and Scarlett Johansson
- Café Lumière (2003) – directed by Hou Hsiao-hsien
- The Day After Tomorrow (2004) — directed by Roland Emmerich, starring Dennis Quaid and Jake Gyllenhaal
- Stratosphere Girl (2004) — directed by Matthias X. Oberg, starring Chloé Winkel
- The Grudge (2004) — directed by Takashi Shimizu, starring Sarah Michelle Gellar and Jason Behr
- Memoirs of a Geisha (2005) — directed by Rob Marshall, starring Zhang Ziyi and Gong Li
- Into the Sun (2005) — directed by Christopher Morrison, starring Steven Seagal and Matt Davis
- Initial D (2005) — directed by Andrew Lau and Alan Mak, starring Jay Chou
- Babel (2006) — directed by Alejandro González Iñárritu, starring Brad Pitt, Cate Blanchett and Gael García Bernal
- Flags of Our Fathers (2006) — directed by Clint Eastwood, starring Ryan Phillippe and Jesse Bradford
- Letters from Iwo Jima (2006) — directed by Clint Eastwood, starring Ken Watanabe and Kazunari Ninomiya
- The Fast and the Furious: Tokyo Drift (2006) — directed by Justin Lin, starring Lucas Black and Bow Wow
- Teen Titans: Trouble in Tokyo (2006)
- Hellboy: Sword of Storms (2006) — directed by Phil Weinstein, starring Ron Perlman and Selma Blair
- Silk (2007) — directed by François Girard, starring Michael Pitt and Keira Knightley
- Monster (2008) — directed by Eric Forsberg, starring Sarah Lieving and Erin Evans
- Tokyo! (2008) — directed by Michel Gondry, starring Leos Carax and Bong Joon-ho
- iGo to Japan (2008) — directed by Steve Hoefer, starring Miranda Cosgrove and Jennette McCurdy
- Blood: The Last Vampire (2009) — directed by Chris Nahon, starring Jun Ji-hyun and Allison Miller
- The Ramen Girl (2009) — directed by Robert Allan Ackerman, starring Brittany Murphy and Sohee Park
- Enter the Void (2009) — directed by Gaspar Noé, starring Nathaniel Brown and Paz de la Huerta
- Scooby-Doo! and the Samurai Sword (2009) — directed by Christopher Berkeley

=== 2010–2019 ===
- Resident Evil: Afterlife (2010) — directed by Paul W. S. Anderson, starring Milla Jovovich
- Cars 2 (2011) — directed by John Lasseter, starring Owen Wilson
- Tatsumi (2011) — directed by Eric Khoo, starring Tetsuya Bessho and Yoshihiro Tatsumi
- Emperor (2012) — directed by Peter Webber, starring Matthew Fox and Tommy Lee Jones
- Skyfall (2012) — directed by Sam Mendes, starring Daniel Craig and Javier Bardem
- Karakara (2012) — directed by Claude Gagnon, starring Gabriel Arcand and Youki Kudoh
- Like Someone in Love (2012) — directed by Abbas Kiarostami, starring Rin Takanashi
- Dick Figures: The Movie (2013) — directed by Ed Skudder and Zack Keller
- The Wolverine (2013) — directed by James Mangold, starring Hugh Jackman and Hiroyuki Sanada
- Pacific Rim (2013) — directed by Guillermo del Toro, starring Charlie Hunnam and Idris Elba
- Rush (2013) — directed by Ron Howard, starring Chris Hemsworth and Daniel Brühl
- Fast & Furious 6 (2013) — directed by Justin Lin, starring Vin Diesel and Paul Walker
- 47 Ronin (2013) — directed by Carl Rinsch, starring Keanu Reeves and Hiroyuki Sanada
- Godzilla (2014) — directed by Gareth Edwards, starring Aaron Taylor-Johnson and Ken Watanabe
- Big Hero 6 (2014) — directed by Don Hall and Chris Williams, starring Scott Adsit and Ryan Potter
- Unbroken (2014) — directed by Angelina Jolie, starring Jack O'Connell and Domhnall Gleeson
- Tokyo Fiancée (2014) — directed by Stefan Liberski, starring Pauline Étienne and Taichi Inoue
- Kumiko, the Treasure Hunter (2014) — directed by David Zellner, starring Rinko Kikuchi
- The Sea of Trees (2015) — directed by Gus Van Sant, starring Matthew McConaughey and Ken Watanabe
- Mr. Holmes (2015) — directed by Bill Condon, starring Ian McKellen and Laura Linney
- Silence (2016) — directed by Martin Scorsese, starring Andrew Garfield and Adam Driver
- Hacksaw Ridge (2016) — directed by Mel Gibson, starring Andrew Garfield and Sam Worthington
- The Handmaiden (2016) — directed by Park Chan-wook, starring Kim Min-hee and Kim Tae-ri
- The Last Princess (2016) — directed by Hur Jin-ho, starring Son Ye-jin and Park Hae-il
- The Great Sommer (2016) — directed by Stefan Jäger, starring Mathias Gnädinger and Loïc Sho
- Kubo and the Two Strings (2016) — directed by Travis Knight, starring Charlize Theron and Art Parkinson
- The Lego Ninjago Movie (2017) — directed by Charlie Bean, starring Dave Franco and Michael Peña
- Kita Kita (2017) — directed by Sigrid Andrea Bernardo, starring Alessandra De Rossi and Empoy Marquez
- Manhunt (2017) — directed by John Woo, starring Zhang Hanyu and Masaharu Fukuyama
- Oh Lucy! (2017) — directed by Atsuko Hirayanagi, starring Shinobu Terajima and Kaho Minami
- Fat Buddies (2018) — directed by Bao Bei'er, starring Bao Bei'er and Wen Zhang
- The Outsider (2018) — directed by Martin Zandvliet, starring Jared Leto and Tadanobu Asano
- Pacific Rim Uprising (2018) — directed by Steven S. DeKnight, starring John Boyega and Scott Eastwood
- Deadpool 2 (2018) — directed by David Leitch, starring Ryan Reynolds and Josh Brolin
- Batman Ninja (2018) — directed by Junpei Mizusaki, starring Kōichi Yamadera
- Isle of Dogs (2018) — directed by Wes Anderson, starring Bryan Cranston and Edward Norton
- Tomb Raider (2018) — directed by Roar Uthaug, starring Alicia Vikander and Dominic West
- Earthquake Bird (2019) — directed by Wash Westmoreland, starring Alicia Vikander and Riley Keough
- Spies in Disguise (2019) — directed by Nick Bruno and Troy Quane, starring Will Smith and Tom Holland
- Family Romance, LLC (2019) — directed by Werner Herzog, starring Yuichi Ishii
- Moonlit Winter (2019) — directed by Lim Dae-hyung, starring Kim Hee-ae and Yūko Nakamura

=== 2020-2029 ===
- Fukuoka (2020) — directed by Zhang Lü, starring Yoon Je-moon and Park So-dam
- Minamata (2020) — directed by Andrew Levitas, starring Johnny Depp and Hiroyuki Sanada
- Lost Girls & Love Hotels (2020) — directed by William Olsson, starring Alexandra Daddario and Takehiro Hira
- Detective Chinatown 3 (2020) — directed by Chen Sicheng, starring Wang Baoqiang and Turbo Liu
- Enter the Fat Dragon (2020) — directed by Kenji Tanigaki and Aman Chang, starring Donnie Yen
- Mortal Kombat (2021) — directed by Simon McQuoid, starring Lewis Tan and Jessica McNamee
- Snake Eyes: G.I. Joe Origins (2021) — directed by Robert Schwentke, starring Henry Golding and Andrew Koji
- Kate (2021) — directed by Cedric Nicolas-Troyan, starring Mary Elizabeth Winstead and Woody Harrelson
- The Matrix Resurrections (2021) — directed by Lana Wachowski, starring Keanu Reeves and Carrie-Anne Moss
- People Just Do Nothing: Big in Japan (2021) — directed by Jack Clough, starring Alan Mustafa and Hugo Chegwin
- Paws of Fury: The Legend of Hank (2022) — directed by Rob Minkoff, starring Michael Cera and Ricky Gervais
- Hunt (2022) — directed by Lee Jung-jae, starring Lee Jung-jae and Jung Woo-sung
- Umami (2022) — directed by Slony Sow, starring Gérard Depardieu and Sandrine Bonnaire
- Bullet Train (2022) — directed by David Leitch, starring Brad Pitt
- John Wick: Chapter 4 (2023) — directed by Chad Stahelski, starring Keanu Reeves and Donnie Yen
- Perfect Days (2023) — directed by Wim Wenders, starring Koji Yakusho and Tokio Emoto
- Tokyo Cowboy (2023) — directed by Marc Marriott, starring Arata Iura and Robin Weigert
- When I Met You in Tokyo (2023) — directed by Rado Peru and Rommel Penesa, starring Vilma Santos and Christopher de Leon
- Ultraman: Rising (2024) — directed by Shannon Tindle and John Aoshima, starring Christopher Sean
- Sonic the Hedgehog 3 (2024) — directed by Jeff Fowler, starring Jim Carrey and Ben Schwartz
- Batman Ninja vs. Yakuza League (2025) — directed by Junpei Mizusaki and Shinji Takagi, starring Kōichi Yamadera
- Predator: Killer of Killers (The Sword) (2025) — directed by Dan Trachtenberg, starring Lindsay LaVanchy and Louis Ozawa
- Rental Family (2025) — directed by Hikari, starring Brendan Fraser and Takehiro Hira
- Little Amélie or the Character of Rain (2025) — directed by Maïlys Vallade and Liane-Cho Han
- Mono No Aware (2026) — directed by BC Amparado, starring Juan Karlos Labajo, Perry Dizon, and Momoko Kobayashi

== Television ==
- Shōgun (1980), miniseries
- The Ginger Tree (1989), miniseries
- Samurai Jack (2001–2004, 2017)
- Kappa Mikey (2006–2008)
- The Pacific (2010), miniseries
- Ninjago (2011–2022)
- The Man in the High Castle (2015–2019)
- Tokyo Trial (2016), miniseries
- Westworld (Season 2) (2018)
- Giri/Haji (2019)
- Star Wars: Visions Volume I (The Duel) (2021)
- Hit-Monkey (2021–2024)
- Invasion (2021–present)
- Pachinko (2022–2024)
- Tokyo Vice (2022–2024)
- Ninjago: Dragons Rising (2023–present)
- Drops of God (2023–present)
- Monarch: Legacy of Monsters (2023–present)
- Blue Eye Samurai (2023–present)
- Shōgun (2024–present)
- Like a Dragon: Yakuza (2024)
- Sunny (2024)
- Neuromancer (2027)
