= Boston Society of Film Critics Awards 2003 =

Annual US film awards ceremony

24th BSFC Awards

December 14, 2003

Best Film:
Mystic River

The 24th Boston Society of Film Critics Awards, honoring the best in filmmaking in 2003, were given on 14 December 2003.

== Winners ==
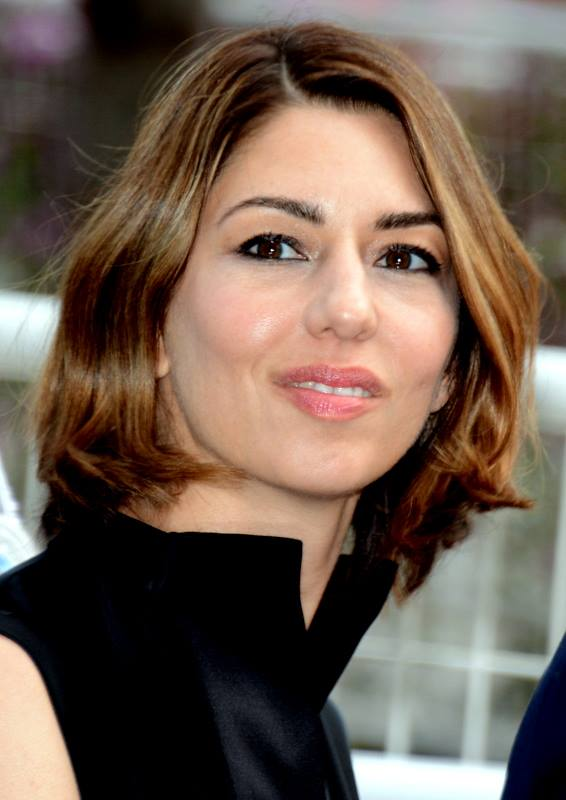
Sofia Coppola, Best Director winner

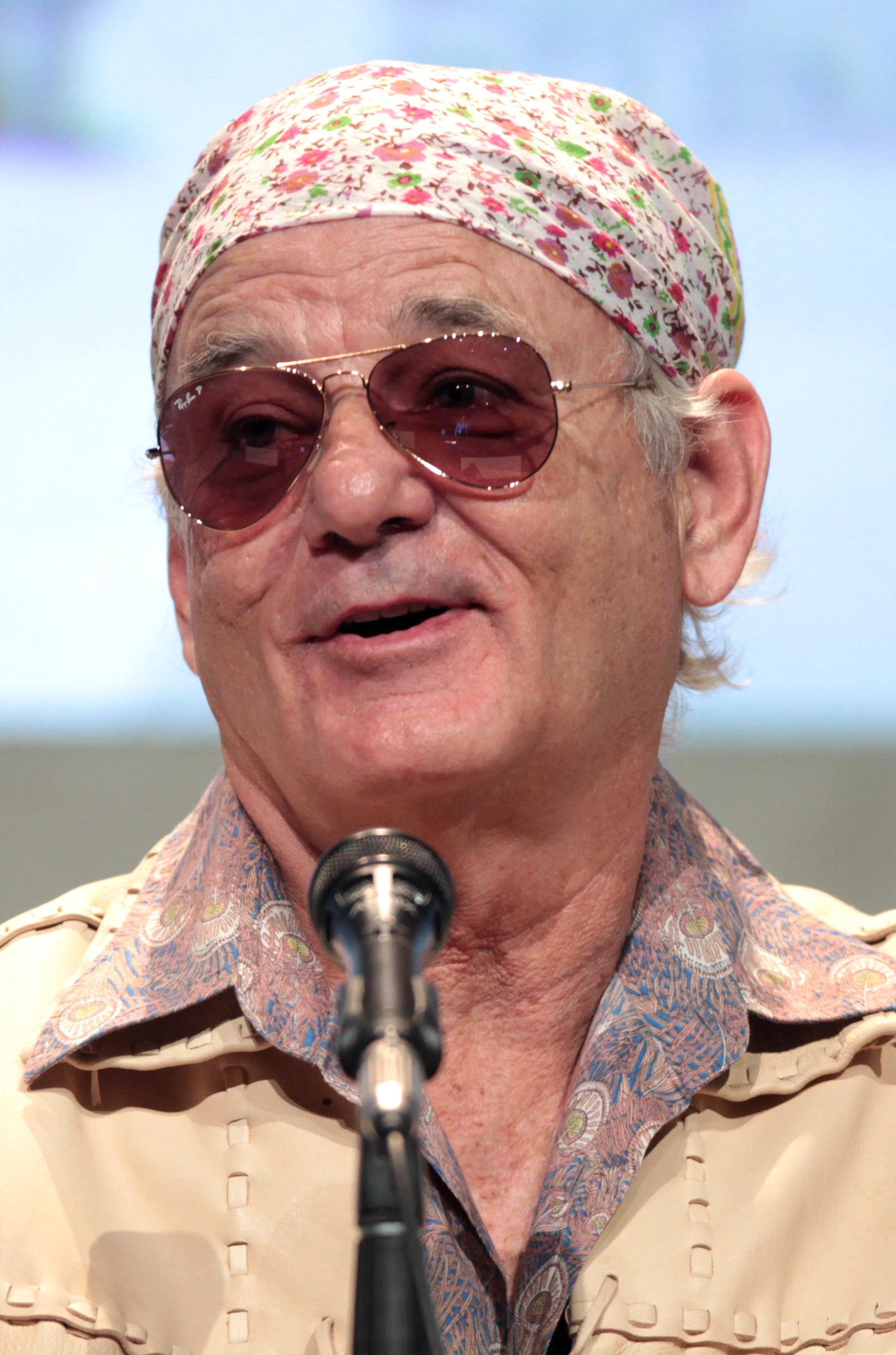
Bill Murray, Best Actor winner

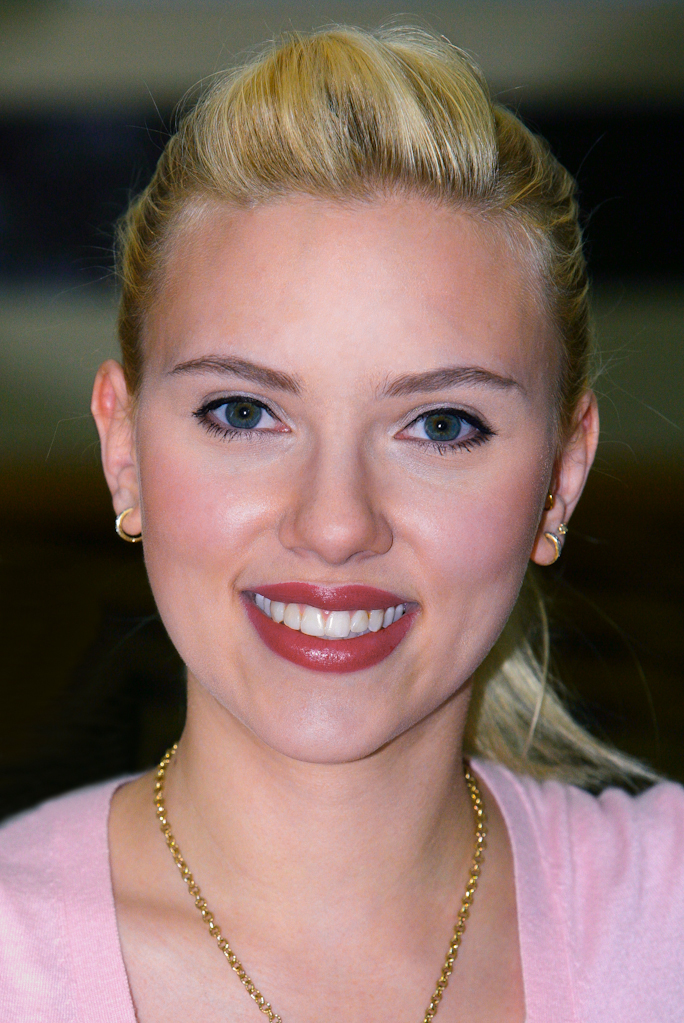
Scarlett Johansson, Best Actress winner

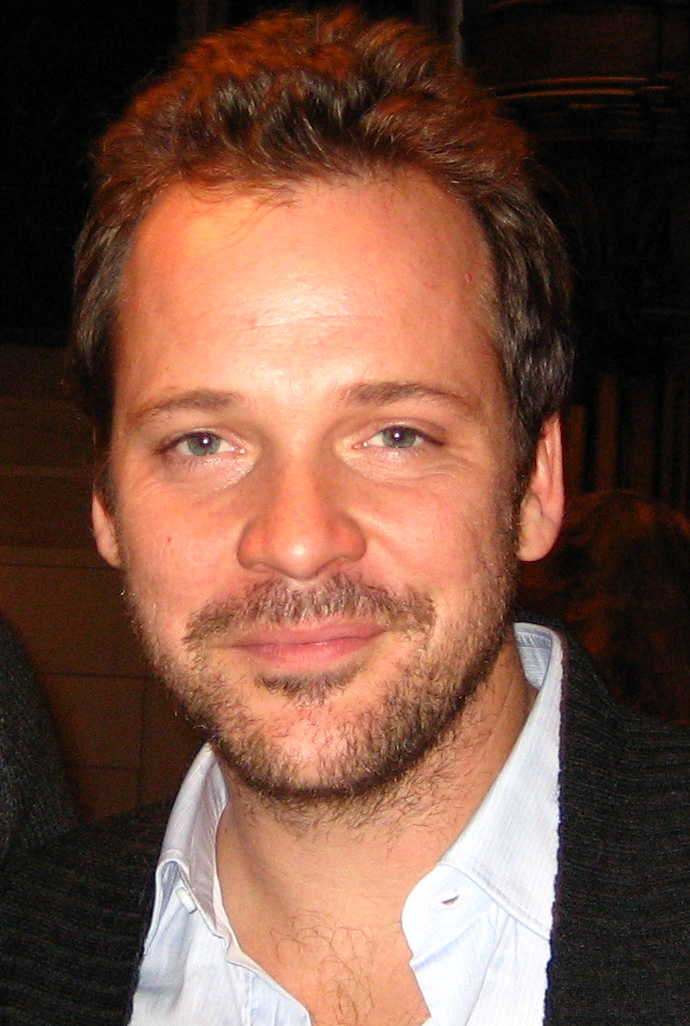
Peter Sarsgaard, Best Supporting Actor winner

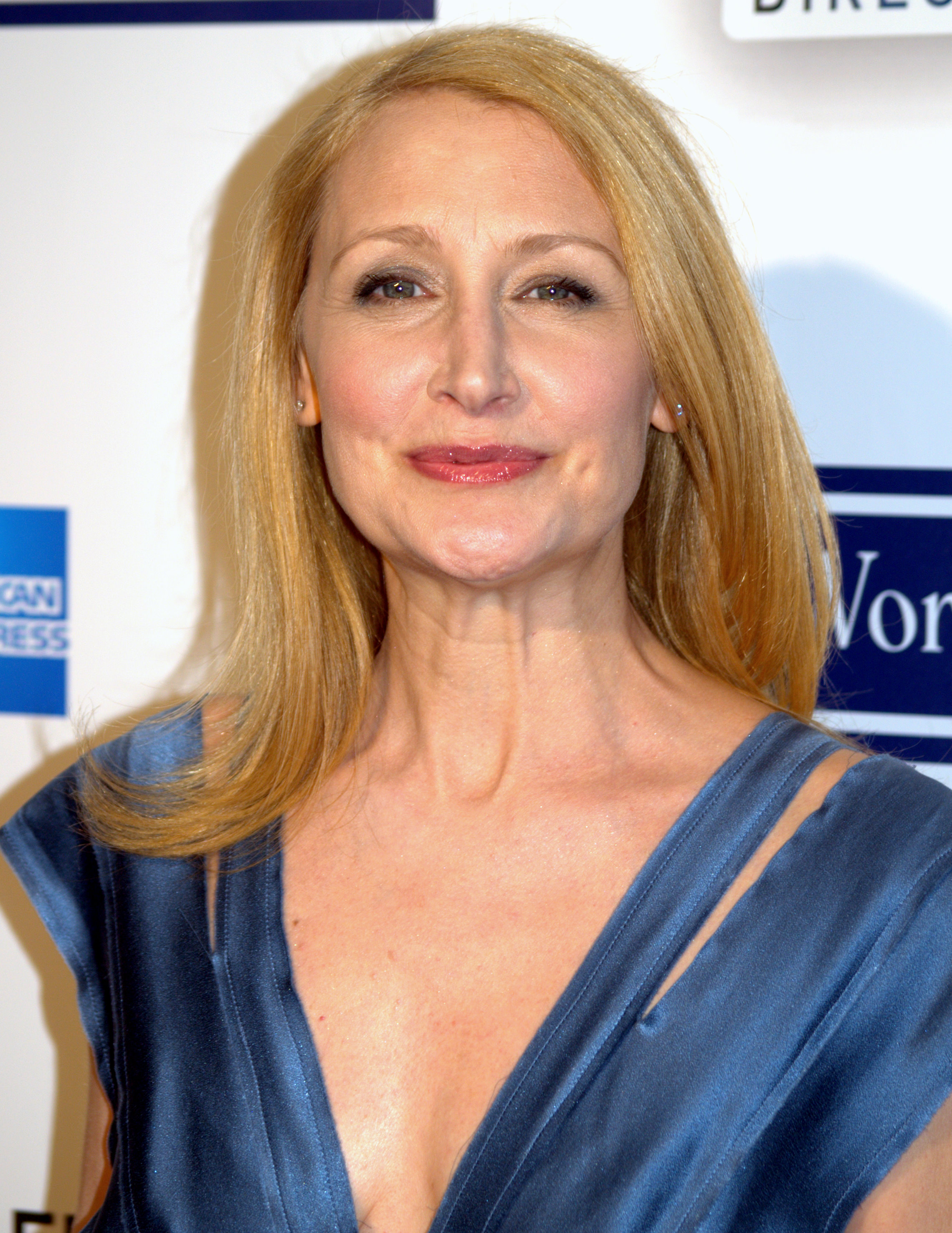
Patricia Clarkson, Best Supporting Actress winner

- Best Film:
  - Mystic River
  - Runner-up: Lost in Translation
- Best Actor:
  - Bill Murray – Lost in Translation
  - Runner-up: Sean Penn – Mystic River
- Best Actress:
  - Scarlett Johansson – Lost in Translation
  - Runner-up: Naomi Watts – 21 Grams
- Best Supporting Actor:
  - Peter Sarsgaard – Shattered Glass
  - Runner-up: Alec Baldwin – The Cooler
- Best Supporting Actress:
  - Patricia Clarkson – Pieces of April and The Station Agent
  - Runner-up: Ludivine Sagnier – Swimming Pool
- Best Director:
  - Sofia Coppola – Lost in Translation
  - Runner-up: Peter Jackson – The Lord of the Rings: The Return of the King
- Best Screenplay:
  - Shari Springer Berman and Robert Pulcini – American Splendor
  - Runner-up: Sofia Coppola – Lost in Translation
- Best Cinematography:
  - Olli Barbé et al. – Winged Migration (Le peuple migrateur)
  - Runner-up: Benoît Debie and Gaspar Noé – Irréversible
- Best Documentary:
  - Capturing the Friedmans
  - Runner-up: The Fog of War
- Best Foreign-Language Film:
  - The Triplets of Belleville (Les triplettes de Belleville) • France/Canada/Belgium
  - Runner-up: Irréversible • France
- Best New Filmmaker:
  - Andrew Jarecki – Capturing the Friedmans
  - Runner-up: Sylvain Chomet – The Triplets of Belleville (Les triplettes de Belleville)
- Best Ensemble Cast:
  - Mystic River
  - Runner-up: A Mighty Wind
