= Aomi Muyock =

Swiss actress (born 1989)

- Born: 14 January 1989 (age 37); Ticino, Switzerland
- Occupations: Model; actress
- Height: 5 ft 10 in (178–179 cm)

Aomi Sessions Muyock (born 14 January 1989) is a Swiss model and actress best known for starring in Gaspar Noé's controversial 2015 film Love.

== Biography ==
She was born and raised in Canton Ticino and is fluent in Italian. An artist herself, her mother is a painter, photographer, and writer, while her father is a sculptor and painter. Muyock modeled for the Elite agency and appeared in fashion shows and advertisements, notably appearing in an advertisement for Lolita Lempicka Perfume. She made her acting debut in the 2015 3D erotic drama Love, although she had initially turned the role down. Director Gaspar Noé offered her the role of Electra after seeing her at a party, and was officially cast a week before filming. She had no acting experience prior to her appearance in the film, in which she did numerous unsimulated sex scenes.

== Filmography ==
=== Film ===
Year	Title	Role	Notes
2015	Love	Electra	
2018	Scenario	Sophie	
2018	Jessica Forever	Jessica	
2023	Best Secret Place		

=== Television ===
Year	Title	Role	Notes
2015	Le Grand Journal (Canal+)	Herself	TV series documentary
