= Twentynine Palms (film) =

- Directed by: Bruno Dumont
- Written by: Bruno Dumont
- Produced by: Rachid Bouchareb
- Starring: Yekaterina Golubeva; David Wissak
- Cinematography: Georges Lechaptois
- Edited by: Dominique Petrot
- Production companies: 3B Productions; MK2
- Distributed by: Wellspring (United States)
- Release dates: September 3, 2003 (Venice Film Festival); September 17, 2003 (France)
- Running time: 119 minutes
- Countries: France; Germany; United States
- Languages: French; English; Russian

Twentynine Palms is a 2003 horror drama film written and directed by Bruno Dumont. Set in Twentynine Palms, the film is about an American photographer and his Russian girlfriend as they scout locations for a photo shoot.

== Plot ==
With a Russian woman called Katia, a young American photographer called David drives a Hummer from Los Angeles to a motel in the little desert town of Twentynine Palms. As she hardly speaks English and he speaks no Russian, they talk in French, a language in which neither is confident. Much of their communication is therefore non-verbal and the two frequently misunderstand each other. Their days are spent driving and walking around the empty desert, sometimes naked. They make love, they fight, or just pass time. The camera contrasts the vastness, timelessness and emptiness of the landscape with the two small humans. Yet, as well as natural beauty, the desert contains menace. Stopped by a pick-up full of rednecks, David is beaten and raped while Katia is stripped and forced to watch. Back at the motel after their ordeal, David cuts off his hair before stabbing Katia to death. The police find the Hummer in the desert with his corpse beside it.

== Reception ==
On review aggregator Rotten Tomatoes, the film holds a 40% approval rating based on 40 reviews, with an average rating of 4.9/10. The website's critical consensus states: "A muddled and inconsequential drama". On Metacritic it has a score of 43 out of 100 based on 16 critics reviews.

Lisa Nesselson of Variety magazine wrote "A "Zabriskie Pointless" for the new millennium, Bruno Dumont‘s third feature, Twentynine Palms, is a narcolepsy-inducing road movie in which an American guy and a French-speaking babe get in a red Hummer and drive toward the titular California desert destination. Pic fails to captivate or intrigue at the most basic level." Ty Burr of The Boston Globe described the film as "a textbook example of how a director can strip away plot, motivation, character, and meaning and still leave arrant pretension standing tall".

In an article for the Christian Science Monitor, David Sterritt wrote about the film "While many will find the movie dull and distasteful in the extreme, it has deeply serious ideas at its core - the same subtly philosophical and implicitly theological concerns that mark Dumont's earlier films, which also criticize people who live entirely in the physical realm of existence at the expense of mental and spiritual perceptions. Dumont's methods are radical, but there's a fascinating method to his seeming cinematic madness."

== Legacy and Analysis ==
James Quandt’s Artforum article on the film led to the coining of the term New French Extremity.

"Whether (Twentynine) Palms paroxysm of violation and death signals that Dumont is borrowing the codes of Hollywood horror films to further his exploration of body and landscape or whether it merely marks a natural intensification of the raw, dauntless corporeality of his previous films, it nevertheless elicits an unintentional anxiety: that Dumont, once imperiously impervious to fashion, has succumbed to the growing vogue for shock tactics in French cinema over the past decade"

Quandt categorized Francois Ozon, Gaspar Noé, Catherine Breillat, Philippe Grandrieux, and Dumont as examples of filmmakers that have “succumbed to the growing vogue for shock tactics in French cinema over the past decade”

The film’s depiction of sex in has been read as revealing 'alternative, non-pornographic ways of being sexual' and thereby creates a 'productive estrangement' from mainstream and pornographic modes of spectatorship. In the book, Brutal Intimacy, critic Tim Palmer wrote about the film’s approach to sexuality: “Human copulation, aggrandized and made primal by the style of this film, reaches a brutish and guttural crescendo, as much a shattering release or explosion of energy as a sexual climax. The act of sex itself, in physical and cinematic form, becomes devoid of pleasure for both diegetic protagonists and their audience—an especially acute irony.”

Writing about the film, Nikolaj Lübecker suggests that "instead of being a rich and multi-layered film, Twentynine Palms is a raw and edgy one. Instead of watching a work in which the three strands [political, physical, metaphysical] organically combine, we experience an implosion of meaning".
