= Enter the Void =

2009 film by Gaspar Noé

- Theatrical release poster
- Directed by: Gaspar Noé
- Written by: Gaspar Noé; Lucile Hadzihalilovic
- Produced by: Brahim Chioua; Vincent Maraval; Olivier Delbosc; Marc Missonnier; Pierre Buffin
- Starring: Nathaniel Brown; Paz de la Huerta; Cyril Roy; Ed Spear
- Cinematography: Benoît Debie
- Edited by: Gaspar Noé; Marc Boucrot; Jérôme Pesnel
- Production companies: Fidélité Films; Wild Bunch; Les Cinémas de la Zone; BUF Compagnie; Essential Filmproduktion; BIM Distribuzione
- Distributed by: Wild Bunch Distribution (France/Germany); BIM Distribuzione (Italy)
- Release dates: 22 May 2009 (Cannes); 5 May 2010 (France); 26 August 2010 (Germany); 9 December 2011 (Italy)
- Running time: Long version: 161 minutes; International version: 143 minutes
- Countries: France; Germany; Italy
- Language: English
- Budget: €12.4 million
- Box office: $1.5 million

Enter the Void is a 2009 surrealist art film directed by Gaspar Noé, from a screenplay co-written with his partner Lucile Hadžihalilović. Set in the neon-lit nightclub environments of Tokyo, the story follows Oscar (Nathaniel Brown), a young American drug dealer who gets fatally shot by the police, but continues to watch subsequent events during an out-of-body experience. The film is shot from a first-person viewpoint with extensive uses of long take, which often floats above the city streets, and occasionally features Oscar staring over his own shoulder as he recalls moments from his past. Noé labels the film a "psychedelic melodrama".

A passion project for Noé since his adolescence, the film was in development hell for years until its production was made possible after the commercial success of his earlier feature, Irréversible (2002). Enter the Void was primarily financed by Wild Bunch, while Fidélité Films led the actual production. With a mix of professionals and newcomers, the film makes heavy use of imagery inspired by experimental cinema and psychedelic drug experiences. Principal photography took place on location in Tokyo, and involved many complicated crane shots. Co-producers included the visual effects studio BUF Compagnie, which also provided the computer-generated imagery. The film's soundtrack is a collage of electronic pop and experimental music.

A rough cut premiered at the 2009 Cannes Film Festival, but post-production work continued, and the film was not released in France until almost a year later. A cut-down version was released in the United States and United Kingdom in September 2010. The critical response was sharply divided: positive reviews described the film as captivating and innovative, while negative reviews called it tedious and puerile. The film performed poorly at the box office.

== Plot ==
American siblings Oscar and Linda live in an apartment in the Japanese capital of Tokyo, and have vowed to stay together following the accidental death of their parents. Oscar deals drugs while Linda works as a stripper in a Tokyo strip club. Most of the film takes place in Oscar's first-person perspective, with flashbacks to his and Linda's past taking place from an outside perspective.

One evening, after Linda has left for work, Oscar smokes DMT and indulges in a hallucinogenic trip until his friend Victor summons him to a drug deal at a bar known as "The Void". Oscar's other friend Alex spontaneously visits and accompanies him to the bar. On the way, Alex discusses The Tibetan Book of the Dead, a Buddhist scripture on reincarnation, and anticipates the events to come by describing the process of death. Oscar enters "The Void" alone, and finds that he has walked into a sting; the police raid the bar when Oscar greets a distressed Victor. Oscar escapes into a bathroom stall and vainly attempts to flush the drugs into the squat toilet. As the officers try to kick in the door, Oscar bluffs that he is armed, resulting in the police shooting him in the chest through the door. Oscar's soul – as well as the first-person perspective – rises from his body, and he goes in search of Linda, attempting to fulfill his promise to never leave her. For the remainder of the movie, Oscar's soul travels through Tokyo, watching over his friends and sister, as well as flashing back to memories of his childhood and his earlier life in Tokyo that led him to become a drug dealer.

The lives of Oscar and Linda are presented in short non-chronological flashbacks; in the midst of a happy childhood, their parents were killed in a violent car crash. Before being sent to different foster homes, the siblings took an oath to always be there for each other. Years later, Oscar lived as a small-time drug dealer in Tokyo and was soon able to afford a plane ticket for Linda to live with him. Linda found work as a stripper for nightclub owner Mario. As Oscar's business expanded, Victor discovered that Oscar had sex with his mother to secure extra funding for Linda's plane ticket. This led him to set up the raid that ended Oscar's life.

Linda becomes pregnant, loses her job as a stripper, and has an abortion. Alex is forced into hiding on the streets after Oscar's dealer, Bruno, breaks up the drug ring.

(The shortened version of the film ends at this point, zooming in on Linda's aborted fetus)

Linda wishes she had gotten involved with Alex instead of Mario as Oscar wanted. On one occasion, Linda wishes that Oscar would come back to life; Oscar then enters Linda's head and experiences her dream in which he wakes up at the morgue, from which his body is taken to be cremated. Greatly distressed by the presence of her deceased brother's cremated remains in her home, and constantly plagued by nightmares about the loss of him, she dumps the ashes down the drain of her kitchen sink. Meanwhile, Victor argues with his mother over her involvement with Oscar, and he is thrown out of the house. He then visits Linda to apologize for his role in Oscar's death. However, when he also accuses Linda of complicity in her brother's death, she angrily chases Victor away, demanding that he kill himself.

Oscar hovers over Tokyo and lands on a plane, in which Oscar's mother breast-feeds a baby Oscar. Linda and Alex take a taxi to a Tokyo love hotel and have sex. Oscar moves among hotel rooms and observes several other couples having sex in various positions. He also spots Victor giving fellatio to a man in one of the rooms, with another man watching and taking his belt off. Each couple emanates flashes of light from their genitals. Oscar enters Alex's head and witnesses the sex with Linda from Alex's perspective. He then travels inside Linda's vagina to witness Alex's penis thrusting into it, then observes his ejaculation and follows the channel of sperm into the fertilization of his sister's ovum. The final scene is shot from the perspective of a baby being born, with the camera focus strongly blurred, making it unclear who the woman in the scene is. (Note: According to the director, this is a flashback to Oscar's birth in the form of a false memory.)

== Cast ==
- Nathaniel Brown as Oscar
  - Jesse Kuhn as Young Oscar
- Paz de la Huerta as Linda
  - Emily Alyn Lind as Young Linda
- Cyril Roy as Alex
- Olly Alexander as Victor
- Ed Spear as Bruno
- Masato Tanno as Mario
- Nobu Imai as Tito
- Sakiko Fukuhara as Saki
- Sara Stockbridge as Suzy
- Emi Takeuchi as Carol
- Rumiko Kimishima as Rumi

== Themes ==
The cinematic experience itself is the main focus of the film, but there is also a central theme of emptiness. Noé describes the film's subject as "the sentimentality of mammals and the shimmering vacuity of the human experience." The dramaturgy after Oscar has been shot is loosely based on The Tibetan Book of the Dead, and ends with the spirit's search for a way to reincarnate. The director, who opposes all religious beliefs, says that "the whole movie is a dream of someone who read The Tibetan Book of the Dead, and heard about it before being [shot by a gun]. It's not the story of someone who dies, flies and is reincarnated, it's the story of someone who is stoned when he gets shot and who has an intonation of his own dream." Noé describes the ending of the film as Oscar's recollection of "the most traumatic moment of his life – his own birth". The director also leaves open the possibility that Oscar's life starts over again in an endless loop, due to the human brain's perception of time.

== Production ==
=== Development ===
The idea for the film had been growing since Noé's adolescence, when he first became interested in matters of death and existence. In his early twenties—while under influence of psilocybin mushrooms—he saw Robert Montgomery's Lady in the Lake, a 1947 film shot entirely in a first-person perspective. He then decided that, if he ever made a film about the afterlife, that was the way in which it would be filmed. Noé had been working on different versions of the screenplay for fifteen years before the film went into production. The story had initially been more linear, and the drafts were set in different locations, including the Andes, France, and New York City. Tokyo was chosen because it could provide colourful environments required for the film's hallucinogenic aspects, and because Japan's repressive drug laws add to the drama, explaining the intensity of the main character's fear of the police.

Noé first tried to get the film funded in the early 2000s. Several producers responded positively to the script, and it was briefly under development for Tom Tykwer's German company X-Filme Creative Pool. It was considered too expensive and the producers dropped out. Prospects changed when Irréversible (2002) became a commercial success. Noé had written and directed Irréversible for StudioCanal, and it was sold internationally by their subsidiary, Wild Bunch. When the producers at Wild Bunch asked Noé what he wanted to do next, he answered Enter the Void. The project was once again considered too expensive in relation to its commercial potential, but when Wild Bunch discovered that Noé had started to develop the film for Pathé instead of them, they said that they were willing to fund it. Since development went slowly at Pathé, Noé chose to not renew his contract with the studio and accepted Wild Bunch's offer.

Enter the Void was produced under Fidélité Films, with 70% of the budget invested by Wild Bunch. French co-producers included Noé's company Les Cinémas de la Zone and the visual effects studio BUF Compagnie. It received pre-sales investment from Canal+ and funding from Eurimages. Additional co-production support was provided by Essential Filmproduktion of Germany and BIM Distribuzione of Italy. The total budget was 12.38 million euro. In retrospect, Noé called Irréversible a bank robbery, a film made in order to finance Enter the Void. He also saw it as a helpful technical exercise.

=== Casting ===
The decision to use English-speaking actors was made early. Since the film would be very visual, the director wanted audiences to be able to focus on the images, and not have to rely on subtitles. He later expressed his approval of the use of dubbed voice tracks in non-English speaking countries.

The role of Linda was the first to be cast. Noé found Paz de la Huerta after holding auditions in New York City. "I met Paz and I really liked her. She had the profile for the character because she likes screaming, crying, showing herself naked—all the qualities for it." Due to a desire that Linda and Oscar should be believable as siblings, Nathaniel Brown, a non-professional, was cast because of his resemblance to Huerta. Noé feared that a professional actor would be frustrated by being shown almost exclusively from behind, but he felt that Brown, an aspiring director, would find it stimulating to merely be present on the set. Auditions were held for Westerners living in Japan for other Tokyo-based roles. Cyril Roy went to an audition with a friend only because he wanted to talk with the director, whose previous films he admired. Roy was cast as Alex, since Noé found his talkative personality suitable for the role. Noé said about Brown and Roy:

The thought of acting in a film had never even entered their minds. They're easy-going people, they have a good time in front of the camera and I don't think there was a single moment where either of them felt they were working. Paz, however, was definitely conscious of the fact that she was interpreting a role.

=== Visual conception ===
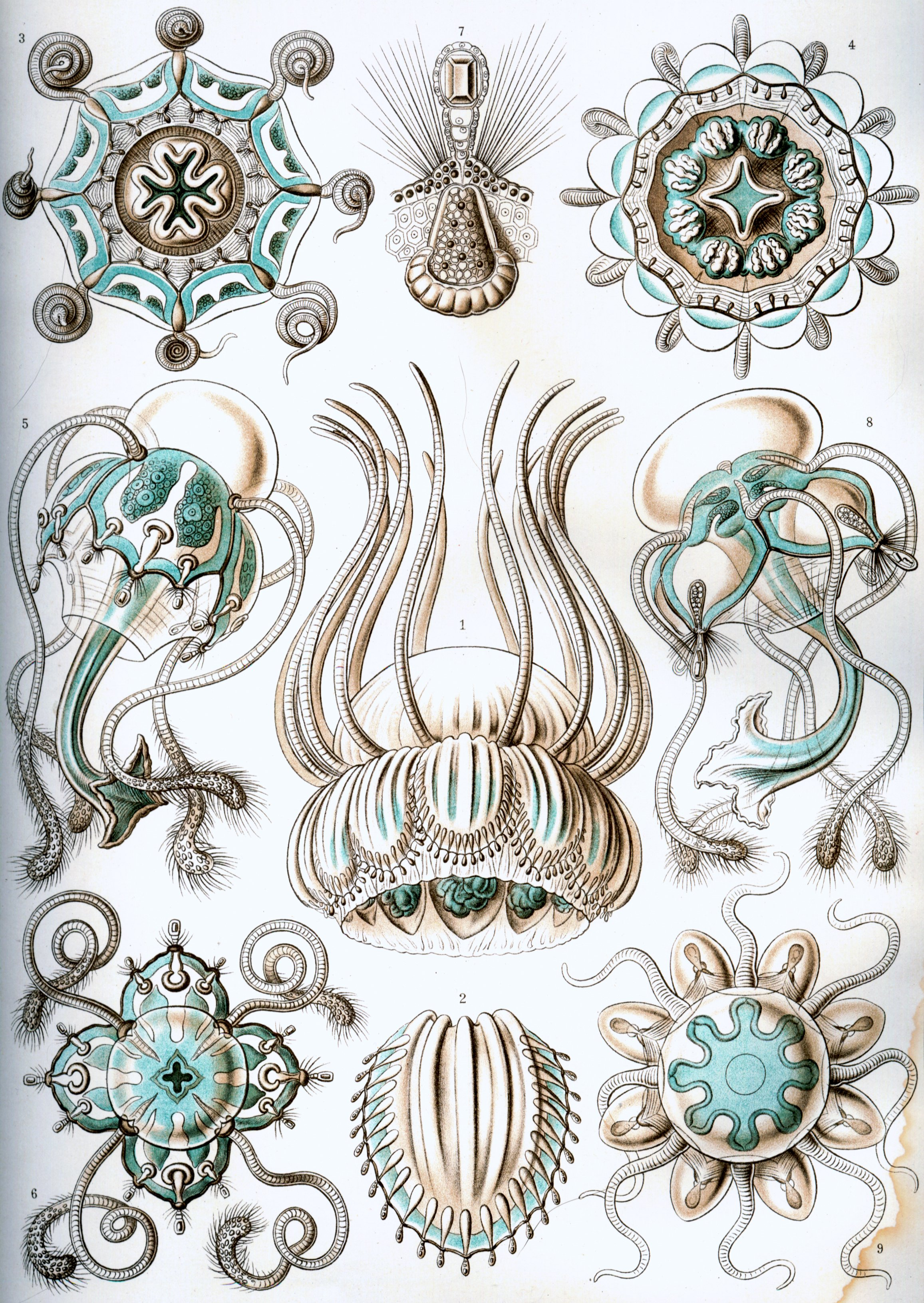
Ernst Haeckel: Kunstformen der Natur (Art Forms of Nature)

Noé had tried various hallucinogens in his youth, and used those experiences as inspiration for the visual style. Later, when the director was already planning the film, he tried the psychoactive brew ayahuasca, in which the active substance is DMT. This was done in the Peruvian jungle, where the brew is legal due to its traditional use as an entheogen. Noé described the experience as very intense, and said he regarded it "almost like professional research." Since few on the design team had ever taken a hallucinogen, it was necessary for Noé to collect and provide visual references in the forms of paintings, photographs, music videos, and excerpts from films. One reference used was the works of biologist Ernst Haeckel, whose drawings influenced the organic patterns seen during Oscar's visions.

There is nothing radically new, I took some techniques or narrative modes that were already in place from right to left in films, but used them in an obsessive manner.

— Gaspar Noé, Libération

Another important stylistic influence was the experimental oeuvre of Kenneth Anger, and in particular Inauguration of the Pleasure Dome. Noé saw Anger's films in the early 1990s, while promoting the short film Carne, and quickly became a fan. Other influences from experimental cinema included the works of Jordan Belson and Peter Tscherkassky. Noé's favourite film, 2001: A Space Odyssey, was the most prominent influence among mainstream films; Noé wanted to become a filmmaker after he saw it at the age of seven. Brian De Palma's Snake Eyes and other films which feature hovering overhead shots inspired Noé to make a film largely from such a perspective.

There were two reasons for showing Oscar's head and shoulders within the frame during the flashback scenes, rather than letting the camera be the character's eyes. The first was that this is the way Noé usually sees himself in dreams and when recalling past events. He also thought it would be easier for the viewer to care about a character who is visible, as many point-of-view films, in his opinion, look unintentionally funny.

=== Filming ===
The crew filmed in Tokyo from 19 October to 15 December 2007. Flashback scenes were shot in Montreal over the course of four weeks the following spring, until 16 May 2008. The team went back to Tokyo twice for additional footage, once before the Montreal session and once when principal photography was complete. Only four persons on the Tokyo set were French; the rest of the crew was Japanese. Marc Caro worked as the supervisor of set designs in Tokyo. According to Noé, Caro had three months free after finishing Dante 01, his first effort as a solo director, so Noé asked him to come to Japan.

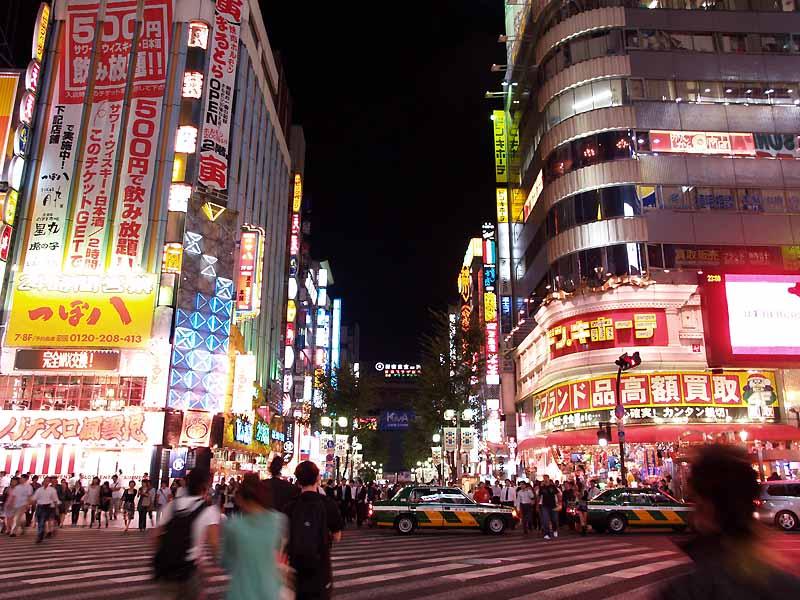
Kabukichō's Central Road at night in October 2007

The 100-page screenplay detailed plot developments and many of the visual traits, but very little dialogue was scripted, so the actors were asked to improvise their lines. Noé explained this approach: "For me, directing actors is just finding the right people and putting them in the right mood on the set and letting them go. ... I think the energy has to come on the set at the very last minute." Locations were used in Kabukichō and other parts of Shinjuku. Since much of the film was set in neighbourhoods known for gambling and prostitution, the producers made agreements with the Yakuza crime syndicates before filming some of the on-location scenes. Criminal organisations were not involved in the actual production. Studio scenes set in Tokyo were filmed at Toho Studios. More scenes than originally planned had to be filmed in the studio because of the many complicated crane arrangements. Some of the overhead sequences took a full day to arrange and film. The scenes where Oscar is alive were mostly shot on location, but the crane shots were exclusively taken in the studio; this included revisits to some of the previous locations, which were replicated as large indoor sets. Other shots were taken from helicopters flying over the city. Much attention was paid to the continuity of the geography, and filming was overseen by a supervisor from the visual-effects team.

The film was mainly shot on Kodak Vision3 250D film stock. Scenes where Oscar is alive were shot in the super 35 format with Arricam LT cameras, and the rest in super 16 with an Aaton XTR Prod. The cinematographer was Benoît Debie, who also shot Irréversible. As in Irréversible, Noé was reluctant to use artificial lighting that would destroy the illusion if the camera was turned around. Thanks to Tokyo's many neon signs, very little additional lighting was required for the exterior scenes, despite the fact that many were shot late at night. For the interior scenes Debie mainly used practical, in-frame light sources. Some exceptions were made. One was that the moods of the characters were meant to be indicated by different colours, ranging from orange to purple with occasional greens. For this, Debie used a set of red, green, and blue programmable disco lights, which allowed for all different hues. The disco lights were easy to hide. They were also used for simulation of neon flashes, and to add a tint of red to the dressing-room scenes. Another exception was the use of strobe lights, which were programmed together with the coloured lights. Blue colour was avoided throughout, since the filmmakers did not associate it with dreams. Noé was the film's camera operator, except for a few shots of Oscar running in the streets, as they required a taller cameraman. In those scenes, the camera was held by Debie.

=== Post-production ===
Enter the Void's post-production process lasted more than a year. Work on the digital effects was led by Pierre Buffin of BUF Compagnie. Every scene in the film includes computer-generated imagery (CGI)—even the flashback scenes, where the backdrops were digitally altered. Studio scenes, helicopter shots, and CGI were forged together in the hovering sequences with the intention that the viewer should be unable to determine which is which. For shots from high altitudes, the team started with helicopter footage from video, and then created computer models of the neighbourhoods with textures from photographs. Neon lights, reflections, and dark areas were consistently accentuated. Flickers were created through a mixture of motion blur, chromatic aberration, and focus effects. For scenes seen as through a fisheye lens, the team recreated the sets digitally and progressively increased the environments' reflection values along with the lens effect.

Noé initially asked the Daft Punk member Thomas Bangalter, who had composed the music for Irréversible, to create an original soundtrack for Enter the Void. Bangalter was occupied with work on Tron: Legacy and had to decline. As a compromise, he provided Noé with an arrangement of ambient sounds and samples from existing experimental music, from which Noé compiled what he envisioned as "a maelstrom of sounds." Bangalter is billed in the credits as sound effects director, and the film features his track "Désaccords" originally composed for Irréversible. One of the sources of inspiration for the soundtrack was "Revolution 9" by The Beatles, a sound collage which Noé describes as a work "where you catch the beginning of a note, or of a melody and then it's already somewhere else." The two main musical themes of the film are "Freak" by the British electro artist LFO, which is played during the opening credits, and a recording by Delia Derbyshire of Johann Sebastian Bach's "Air on the G String", which serves as the theme for Oscar's childhood and his relationship with Linda. The beginning of "ANS" by the British band Coil is heard during Oscar's first DMT trip. The Throbbing Gristle song "Hamburger Lady" plays as Oscar tries to deliver drugs to Victor at the bar. The soundtrack notably includes excerpts from nearly every part of Jean-Claude Éloy's two compositions, Shânti and Gaku-no-Michi. Other songs on the soundtrack include Toshiya Tsunoda's "Music for Baby", Alvin Lucier's "Music for Gamelan Instruments, Microphones, Amplifiers and Loudspeakers", and works by Denis Smalley, Lullatone, and Zbigniew Karkowski.

When the film premiered at film festivals, it was initially shown in a version without any credits. As several people at the screenings complained about the length of the film, Noé decided that if the final version would have any opening titles, they would have to be "as fast as possible and as graphic as possible". The German experimental filmmaker Thorsten Fleisch was hired to create the title logo. Noé discovered Fleisch through his 2007 film Energie!, for which the technique of animated sparks had been developed.

== Release ==
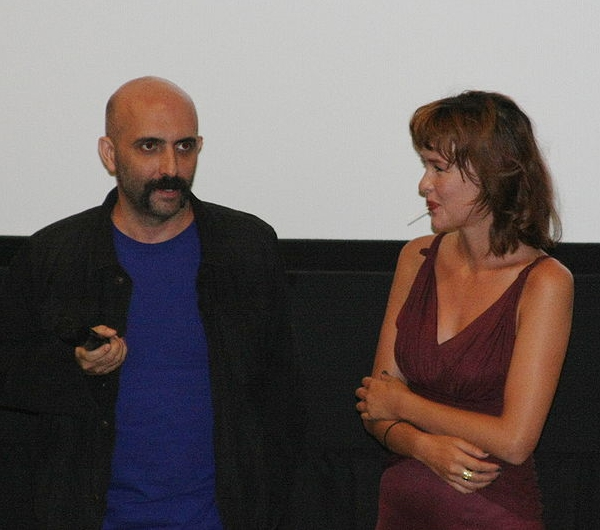
Gaspar Noé and Paz de la Huerta answering questions about the film at the Toronto International Film Festival

A 163-minute version of the film competed in the main competition of the 2009 Cannes Film Festival. The Cannes cut lacked much of the finished film's sound design, and some visual effects were not fully in place. Noé said about the version: "the film was like a baby of three months. I took it out of my belly to show it, flattered by [festival general] Thierry Frémaux's invitation, but it was still in gestation. So I had to put it back into my belly, that is to say to tweak many details."

Festival screenings of subsequent versions followed throughout the year, including the Toronto, Sitges, London, and Stockholm international film festivals. The final 154-minute cut premiered at the 2010 Sundance Film Festival. At the Cannes premiere, the film had alternatively been listed with the French title Soudain le vide, which means "Suddenly the void".

When it was released in France, it used the English title. It premiered in France on 5 May 2010 through Wild Bunch Distribution. The Japanese release followed ten days later.

Distribution rights for the United States were picked up at Sundance by IFC Films. Trinity Filmed Entertainment was the British distributor. The film was released in the United States and the United Kingdom on 24 September 2010. In both these countries, the film was distributed without the seventh of its nine reels. The running time was therefore 137 minutes at 25 frames per second, which the director had instructed that the film should be played at, or 142 minutes at the more common 24 frames per second. Noé says that none of the cut material is essential for the film. He describes it as "some astro-visions, an orgy scene with Linda and the Japanese girl, the scene where you see [Oscar] waking up at the morgue and he thinks he's alive but he's not, and then the camera goes down the plughole where she's tipping his ashes." The reason the shorter version was made was that Noé had promised the investors to make an alternative edit if the film ended up being longer than two hours and 20 minutes. The film was released on DVD and Blu-ray Disc in France on 1 December 2010. Each edition features both the complete version and the shorter cut.

== Reception ==
=== Critical response ===
Thomas Sotinel of Le Monde started his review by recalling the irritation the film caused upon its world premiere in Cannes, and compared the cut he had seen there to the final version: "In all honesty, the difference does not jump to my eyes. Of course, the film seems more consistent, but that may be because we've already traveled this maze once. While leaving, we might remain calmer, but still amazed by the mixture of exuberant invention and puerility." A positive review came from L'Express, written by Laurent Djian, who compared the film to 2001: A Space Odyssey. He applauded how he found the strobe lights hypnotising in a way that influenced the perception of time. "In 2010, no other filmmaker [in France] than Gaspar Noé can shoot with such mastery, nor draw us into a vortex of sensations as vertiginous." Ouest-France's critic, on the other hand, was immensely bored by the film, and called it "a padding of simple ideas, stereotypes and cliches in a heap of contrived and vain images which think they're technical prowess. Soporific cinema."

Upon the Japanese release, the critic writing for The Japan Times reflected: "If Lost in Translation is the film you'd make when all you know about Japan are the pampered press junkets at Shinjuku 5-star hotels, then Enter the Void is what you would make if you never got beyond the Roppongi pub-crawl." While the review was largely negative, the author was still impressed by the visual depiction of the Japanese capital: "Visually, much of the film is stunning ... and the art design by Marc Caro (Delicatessen) takes Tokyo's love of neon gaudiness to a surreal extreme".

Enter the Void holds an approval rating of 73% on review aggregator website Rotten Tomatoes, based on 97 English-language reviews, with an average rating of 6.80/10. The website's critics' consensus reads: "Grimy and psychedelic, Enter the Void ushers audiences through an out-of-body experience with the eye for extremity and technical wizardry that Gaspar Noé fans have come to expect." On Metacritic, the film holds a score of 69 out of 100, based on 19 critics, indicating "generally favorable reviews".

Peter Bradshaw included the film in The Guardian's top 50 films of the decade so far, and gave it five stars out of five. He compared it to Irréversible, which he had disliked:

Enter the Void is, in its way, just as provocative, just as extreme, just as mad, just as much of an outrageous ordeal[.] ... But despite its querulous melodrama and crazed Freudian pedantries, it has a human purpose the previous film lacked, and its sheer deranged brilliance is magnificent. ... Love him or loathe him – and I've done both in my time – Gaspar Noé is one of the very few directors who is actually trying to do something new with the medium, battling at the boundaries of the possible.

Andrew Male rated the film two out of five in Empire. Male called it "technically stunning", but also "dreadfully acted, tediously 'profound' and painfully overlong", and accused the director of misogyny. The Village Voice's Karina Longworth had several reservations about the film. She thought that the characters lacked emotional depth and called the story "a lame fusion of stoner lifestyle, sexual fetish, and philosophical inquiry", but still ended the review: "I could stare at this movie for days and not get tired of the sensation. A mash-up of the sacred, the profane, and the brain-dead, Enter the Void is addictive." Jen Chaney of The Washington Post thought that the film was successful as an "attempt to transport moviegoers to a hallucinatory version of the hereafter unlike anything they've ever witnessed on film", but added: "The problem is that it's also the most excruciating sit in recent cinematic memory. And no, the fact that it's intentionally excruciating doesn't make it less excruciating."

In a 2016 international critics' poll conducted by BBC, three critics listed Enter the Void as one of the greatest motion pictures since 2000.

=== Box office ===
The film was a financial failure; according to Wild Bunch in February 2011, the film had returned 1.25% of the investment. In France, it was launched on 30 prints and sold 51,126 tickets in total. Producer Brahim Chioua said that the film had been difficult to sell abroad for a reasonable price due to the Great Recession. The Numbers reported that the worldwide theatrical revenues corresponded to US$1,467,278.

=== Accolades ===
Enter the Void won the Special Jury Award and the prize for Best Cinematography at the 2009 Sitges Film Festival. It received the main award for best film at the 2010 Neuchâtel Film Festival. This especially delighted Noé, since one of the jury members in Neuchâtel was Douglas Trumbull, the special effects supervisor of 2001: A Space Odyssey.

== See also ==
Cinematic context

- Cinema of France
- Oneiric (film theory)

Lists

- List of drug films
- List of films featuring hallucinogens
- List of films set in Japan
- List of ghost films

Thematically related

- Near-death experience
- Recreational drug use
