= Jessica Forever =

- Film poster
- Directed by: Caroline Poggi; Jonathan Vinel
- Written by: Caroline Poggi; Jonathan Vinel
- Produced by: Emmanuel Chaumet
- Starring: Aomi Muyock; Sebastian Urzendowsky; Augustin Raguenet; Lukas Ionesco; Eddy Suiveng; Paul Hamy; Maya Coline; Angelina Woreth
- Narrated by: Sarah-Megan Allouch
- Cinematography: Marine Atlan
- Edited by: Vincent Tricon
- Music by: Ulysse Klotz
- Release date: September 16, 2018 (TIFF)
- Running time: 97 minutes
- Country: France
- Language: French

Jessica Forever is a 2018 French fantasy sci-fi drama film written and directed by Caroline Poggi and Jonathan Vinel. The film premiered as the closing film of the Platform Prize section of the 2018 Toronto International Film Festival. It also showed in the Panorama section of the 69th Berlin International Film Festival in 2019.

== Plot ==
Jessica leads a group of boys consisting of Julien, Kevin, Lucas, Michael, and Raiden. She seeks to guide them to a place where they can live together peacefully.

== Cast ==
- Aomi Muyock as Jessica
- Sebastian Urzendowsky as Michael
- Augustin Raguenet as Lucas
- Lukas Ionesco as Julien
- Eddy Suiveng as Kevin
- Paul Hamy as Raiden
- Maya Coline as Camille
- Angelina Woreth as Andréa
- Théo Costa-Marini as Trésor
- Franck Falise as Sasha
- Florian Kiniffo as Magic
- Jordan Klioua as Dimitri
- Ymanol Perset as Léopard
- Jean-Marie Pittilloni as Maxime
- Iliana Zabeth as ice cream seller
- Ilyess Meftahi as party boy 1
- Corentin Bachelair as party boy 2
- Bastien Austruy as party boy 3
- Christian Desole as boatmaster
- Abel Mandico as voice of magic water

== Reception ==
On review aggregator website Rotten Tomatoes the film has a score of 54% based on reviews from 13 critics, with an average rating of 5/10.

Pat Mullen of POV praised the lead actress, writing "Jessica Forever features a heroic woman of the Lara Croft variety leading a group of lost boys through a world in which orphans are hunted, but the film proves too sparse and thinly conceived for its ambiguously open premise to be remotely intriguing or effective".

Jonathan Romney of Film Comment wrote that "Jessica Forever isn't primarily about effects or action - it's largely about feelings, and surprisingly delicate feelings at that".

According to Rafael Motamayor of Bloody Disgusting, "[the film] starts up with a promising premise that it abandons after 5 minutes in favor of following the most boring group of characters in recent memory".

Lena Wilson of The Playlist gave the film a "D" rating, explaining her reasoning by writing that "Jessica Forever has a few delightfully experimental moments – birthday cake letters and self-immolation make for some stunning visuals – but it quickly dovetails into nonsense". She also added that "[t]here are movies, like I Think We're Alone Now and Annihilation" that according to her "use sci-fi strangeness to enhance their dramatic potential and further captivate the audience".
