= Nathaniel Brown (actor) =

American actor

Nathaniel Brown (born May 20, 1988) is an American actor, director, and creative director.

== Career ==
Brown played the lead role in the 2009 Gaspar Noé thriller Enter the Void, alongside Paz De La Huerta.

As a director and creative director, Brown has worked widely across the commercial, fashion, and music worlds, collaborating prominently with artists Kanye West, Beyonce, Swedish House Mafia, and fashion houses John Elliot and En Noir.
