= Lux Æterna (film) =

2019 film

- Theatrical release poster
- Directed by: Gaspar Noé
- Written by: Gaspar Noé
- Produced by: Anthony Vaccarello; Gary Farkas; Lucile Hadzihalilovic; Clément Lepoutre; Olivier Muller; Gaspar Noé
- Starring: Charlotte Gainsbourg; Béatrice Dalle; Abbey Lee
- Cinematography: Benoît Debie
- Edited by: Jérôme Pesnel
- Production companies: Yves Saint Laurent; Vixens; Les films de la zone
- Distributed by: UFO Distribution; Potemkine Films
- Release dates: 18 May 2019 (Cannes); 23 September 2020 (France)
- Running time: 51 minutes
- Country: France
- Languages: French; English
- Box office: $323,573

Lux Æterna (stylized as LVX ÆTERNA) is a 2019 French independent experimental meta-art film written, produced and directed by Gaspar Noé. The piece heavily employs epileptic imagery through grey and color strobes, split-screen, and uses of 1920s-esque documentary footage involving witchcraft and torture. It was screened out of competition at the 2019 Cannes Film Festival. The film received mixed to positive reviews from critics. It also garnered attention for a scene featuring strobing lights that lasts more than 10 minutes. When the film premiered at Cannes, paramedics were waiting outside in case of audience members becoming sick.

== Plot ==
The film is preceded in screenings by The Art of Filmmaking, a 15-minute montage of Cecil B. DeMille films narrated over with a hypnotic suggestion to relax alongside droning orchestration. The montage strobes through red, green, and blue color grades of itself in rapid succession. The final clip, showing the crucifixion scene from The King of Kings, strobes in black and white.

Lux Æterna begins with a short montage of 1920s-style documentary footage of a witch trial, which abruptly cuts to actresses Charlotte Gainsbourg and Béatrice Dalle playing fictional versions of themselves. About to shoot a film, God's Craft, about witches burnt at the stake, the two actresses sit down in one of the sets and discuss the cinematic depiction of witches, the way women are treated on film sets, and anecdotes from their film shoots.

Throughout the entirety of Lux Æterna, quotations from filmmakers Luis Buñuel, Carl Theodor Dreyer, and Rainer Werner Fassbinder on a director's desire for absolute control are shown on screen.

The women are joined by a producer and assistant, who escort Gainsbourg to her dressing room while Dalle leaves to conduct directorial duties. In split screen, Gainsbourg and her co-stars are seen getting make-up and costuming done while a myriad of complications occur behind the scenes. Of the two other actresses playing witches burned at the stake, only one speaks English and is upset when her outfit is shown to reveal her breasts. Dalle, upset with the entire production team waiting for five hours to shoot one scene, argues with the director of photography (DP) to get the actors some rehearsal time while they wait.

The DP, who has been promised for the director role after Dalle is fired, refuses to do anything she asks while the producers spend their time spying on Dalle to catch any slip-ups they can report to get her fired. A behind-the-scenes cameraman is also seen capturing unflattering moments of the production crew while friends of the crew appear on set and try to make conversation with Gainsbourg and the other actresses.

The production continues to break down once the filming of the witch-burning scene begins. The DP increasingly demands that the camera run for longer and that the actresses never budge. Midway through shooting, the rear projection screen malfunctions and begins to show red, green, and blue strobing colors. Music playback also malfunctions, instead playing an extremely loud droning sound. While Dalle frantically tries to get the projectionist and sound mixers to fix the problem, the DP insists that he is still filming and barks orders at his crew, namely at Gainsbourg to continue acting as if she is on fire and to weep for him.

The other actresses are able to break free of their bonds and leave Gainsbourg, who is unable to break her bonds, on set alone. Dalle tearfully laments why no one else is there to help as only she, Gainsbourg, and the DP remain. Gainsbourg's silhouette dissolves into the strobing colors and the pole she was tied to transforms into a Christian cross. After the credits, one final Buñuel quotation appears: "Thank God I'm an atheist."

== Cast ==
The following cast members portray fictionalized versions of themselves:

- Charlotte Gainsbourg
- Béatrice Dalle
- Abbey Lee
- Clara 3000
- Claude-Emmanuelle Gajan-Maull
- Félix Maritaud
- Fred Cambier
- Karl Glusman
- Lola Pillu Perier
- Loup Brankovic
- Luka Isaac
- Maxime Ruiz
- Mica Argañaraz
- Paul Hameline
- Stefania Cristian
- Yannick Bono
- Tom Kan

== Production ==
Last February, Anthony proposed to support me if I had any idea for a short film. Two weeks later, in five days, with Béatrice and Charlotte we improvised this modest essay about beliefs and the art of filmmaking. Now the 51-minute baby is ready to scream ... Thank God, cinema is light flashing 24 frames per second.

— Gaspar Noé on Lux Æterna at Cannes 2019

== Release ==
The film had its world premiere at the Cannes Film Festival on 18 May 2019. It was set to screen at the Tribeca Film Festival in April 2020; however, the festival was cancelled due to the COVID-19 pandemic. It was released in France on 23 September 2020 by UFO Distribution and Potemkine Films.

Yellow Veil Pictures distributes its US rights to release the film in the United States and Canada in May 2022.

== Reception ==
The review aggregator website Rotten Tomatoes calculated a 64% approval rating from 58 reviews, with an average rating of 5.9/10. The website's consensus reads, "Stylish but hollow, Lux Æterna represents a frustrating regression for writer-director Gaspar Noé." On Metacritic the film has an average score of 59% out of 14 critics indicating “mixed or average reviews”.
