= New French Extremity =

Film studies term

New French Extremity is a term applied a range of films made at the turn of the 21st century that were considered extreme or transgressive. Films of the New French Extremity are characterized by graphic depictions of violence, especially sexual violence, and explicit sexual imagery. Though initially associated with the work of turn-of-the-century French filmmakers such as Gaspar Noé and Catherine Breillat, non-French films subsequently became associated with "new extremity", and use of the label has endured into the 2020s.

Notable films which have been associated with New French Extremity include The Idiots (1998), Baise-moi (2000) The Piano Teacher (2001), Fat Girl (2001), Trouble Every Day (2001), Irréversible (2002), The Brown Bunny (2003), My Mother (2004), Antichrist (2009), A Serbian Film (2010), Nymphomaniac (2013), Raw (2016), and Titane (2021).

== Terminology ==
The term 'new French extremity' was first coined by critic James Quandt in 2004 in a critical piece complaining about the violent turn that French filmmaking appeared to have taken in the late 1990s and early 2000s. This article became the first reference for talking about these films: "Bava as much as Bataille, Salò no less than Sade seem the determinants of a cinema suddenly determined to break every taboo, to wade in rivers of viscera and spumes of sperm, to fill each frame with flesh, nubile or gnarled, and subject it to all manner of penetration, mutilation, and defilement." However, most critics and scholars use Quandt's claims as a starting point for how not to talk about new extreme films, with his work having assumed something of a 'straw man' status. He has been criticized as having a dismissive tone, a reductive amalgamation of a wide variety of quite different films, a nostalgia for the old transgressive films, and an unhelpful conflation of films marked by an arthouse style with new French horror, a series of generically marked horror films.

Since then, substantial work done on these films has produced a variety of overlapping terms to describe the films mentioned above and others like them: 'New European Extremism', 'extreme cinema', 'extreme art cinema', 'new extremism', as well as a 'cinéma du corps', the 'unwatchable', and 'transgressive art films'. The trend is acknowledged to extend beyond the borders of France to Europe, and in some cases further afield, even as French filmmakers dominate any list of new extreme films.

In general, 'extreme' refers both to the kinds of acts depicted in the films, and the manner in which they are depicted. Acts that frequently occur in new extreme films, which are considered extreme, include visible sex (sometimes called unsimulated sex), sexual and sexualized violence, and graphic depictions of violence. According to Oliver Kenny, visibility, proximity, and duration are the key defining stylistic aspects of the presentation of these acts: they are shown in proximate and visible detail, often in lengthy scenes or in long takes, although many other scholars have contributed to discussions about what 'extreme' means in contemporary cinema.

The 'new' in 'new extreme' suggests that these films constitute a new wave that develops upon a series of 'old' extreme films. While films were rarely described as 'extreme' before the 2000s, the 'old' films in question here are mostly violent, politically engaged films from the 1960s and 1970s. The most commonly cited films as 'older' comparisons to 'new' extreme cinema are Weekend and Salò.

== History ==
Sex and violence have long been a part of art and literary history, so there is much writing that may have influenced contemporary cinema. The most commonly discussed literary and artistic reference points for scholars and critics looking at extreme cinema include Marquis de Sade and his many sexual, violent, and sexually violent novels, Gustave Courbet and his painting L'Origine du monde, Antonin Artaud’s writing about the Theatre of Cruelty, and Georges Bataille's work on eroticism and transgression. More recently, a trend towards graphic depictions of sex and violence in literature, sometimes under the moniker contemporary extreme, has been associated with writers such as Henry Miller, Bret Easton Ellis, Michel Houellebecq, Marie Darrieussecq, Richard Morgiève, Alina Reyes, and others.

In a cinematic context, it is an established practice to mix supposedly 'low-brow' forms of popular expression with 'high-brow' filmmaking, notably by including sexual and violent imagery in arthouse films. Art cinema has long been seen as drawing its aesthetics and narrative tropes from forms of eroticism and depictions of the body that transgress mainstream rules such as those of Hollywood. Indeed, many now-canonical French and Italian art films of the 1960s and 1970s were marketed together with exploitation films in the USA because their graphic depiction of nudity was considered to exclude them from the status of art film.

There is a huge range of experimental filmmaking from Europe and elsewhere that has influenced new extreme films (most notably explored by Tim Palmer). Specifically in terms of sexual and violent imagery, 20th-century films that are often considered as precursors to contemporary extreme cinema include Un Chien Andalou (Buñuel & Dalí 1929), The Virgin Spring (Bergman 1960), Belle de Jour (Buñuel 1967), Weekend (Godard, 1967), Straw Dogs (Peckinpah, 1971), The Mother and the Whore (Eustache, 1973), Salò, Or the 120 Days of Sodom (Pasolini 1975), Cannibal Holocaust (Deodato, 1980), Possession (Żuławski, 1981), and A Nos Amours (Pialat, 1983). Tim Palmer also suggests other precursors such as Window Water Baby Moving (Brakhage, 1959), Christmas on Earth (Rubin, 1963), Flaming Creatures (Smith, 1963), and Fuses (Schneeman, 1967).

The most direct and influential presence looming over contemporary European extremity is the films of Michael Haneke, who may be considered as something of a godfather of new extremity. Haneke's films have become very well known for their self-reflective approach to violence—especially The Seventh Continent, 71 Fragments of a Chronology of Chance, Benny's Video, Funny Games, Hidden, and The Piano Teacher. Scholars often read these films as explorations of violence and spectatorship: the films' "aesthetic reflexivity is conducive to the spectator's moral reflexivity", and they also present cultural-political critiques of society: "it is not just the violence depicted in or by cinematic and other audiovisual images but the violence of conventional cinematic representation that Haneke's films diagnose and criticize". Similar analyses will later be made of new extreme films; however, with a few key exceptions, Haneke tends to avoid the direct depiction of violence—whilst his films can be considered extremely violent, there is relatively little on-screen violence, because Haneke considers the ear to be "a more direct route to the imagination".

== Themes and characteristics ==
=== The body ===
New extreme films are especially known for their intimate and challenging images of bodies, what Tim Palmer has called a 'brutal intimacy' and a 'cinema of the body', films "that deal frankly and graphically with the body, and corporeal transgressions, [...] whose basic agenda is an on-screen interrogation of physicality in brutally intimate terms". Palmer describes a cinéma du corps within which he includes many new extreme films (although he does not use this term):

This cinéma du corps consists of arthouse dramas and thrillers with deliberately discomfiting features: dispassionate physical encounters involving filmed sex that is sometimes unsimulated; physical desire embodied by the performances of actors or nonprofessionals as harshly insular; intimacy itself depicted as fundamentally aggressive, devoid of romance, lacking a nurturing instinct or empathy of any kind; and social relationships that disintegrate in the face of such violent compulsions.

=== Rape and sexual assault ===
A defining characteristic of new extreme films is the spectacular depiction of sexual violence, especially rape; most emblematically, the 10-minute rape scene in the middle of Irreversible, when the camera remains static for most of the scene while Alex (Monica Bellucci) is anally raped and then almost beaten to death by her assailant. Lengthy scenes of rape are also a key feature of A Serbian Film, Irréversible, Baise-moi, Fat Girl, Free Will, Holiday, Romance, The Tribe, and Twentynine Palms. As Dominique Russell notes, "these directors' engagement with rape and its on-screen representation is part of their engagement with art cinema itself", and Olivier Joyard contends that "it's unbelievable, but it's like this: rape is a trashy, chic experience, a trendy aesthetic loop-the-loop, the dark horizon of modernity."

New extreme films have been very controversial for their sexually violent imagery. As well as issues with censorship and audience walk-outs, scholars regularly critiqued the representation of rape and sexual assault in these films. One key criticism is the use of rape as an aesthetic element—to create shock and exhilaration in the spectator—and subordinated to political or philosophical purposes, rather than being considered as a physical, literal violation. Another concern is how new extreme films exploit the affect and legal ambiguity of rape, creating challenging scenes of sexual violence that are commonly read in terms of their impact on the viewer, rather than in relation to what they have to say about rape in society.

=== Women and feminism ===
Many of the key filmmakers associated with new extreme films are women and have been discussed in terms of their depictions of women: Catherine Breillat, Claire Denis, Virginie Despentes and Coralie Trinh-Thi, Marina de Van, and, more recently, Julia Ducournau, Coralie Fargeat, Maja Miloš, and Isabella Eklöf. Although some of these female filmmakers have tried to downplay their interest in feminism (e.g., de Van), Breillat, and Despentes are important figures in contemporary French discussions of feminism. Work in French studies has explored how films such as Romance, Fat Girl, and Anatomy of Hell depicted female sexuality, the construction of femininity, gender identity, and sexual violence. Baise-moi has been examined in terms of sexual violence—most notably because of its graphic early rape scene, which created significant controversy—female sexuality, and the female gaze. In My Skin, Raw, Clip, and Holiday have also all been explored in terms of their depiction of female sexual awakening, gendered power relations, sexual violence, and the construction of gender. Key issues for feminist film studies, including sexuality, sexual violence, the gaze, and gender, are repeated concerns for new extreme films, especially those directed by women.

=== National politics ===
Several new extreme films explore political and historical issues (e.g., Battle in Heaven, A Serbian Film, and Taxidermia)

Much analysis of Battle in Heaven reads it in the context of Mexican history and society. The characters are often understood as representative of a two-class system divided between a lighter-skinned dominant class and a darker-skinned lower class: 'Batalla en el cielo's opening scene juxtaposes the corporeal rigidity and moral deficiency of Marcos's brown male figure, with a sensuous and emotionally layered image of Ana, a phenotypically white Mexican woman'. In this reading, the violent and sexual imagery in the film is a cinematic way of making a socio-political critique of Mexican society.

In publicity interviews for A Serbian Film, director Srđan Spasojević argued that his film "is a diary of our own molestation by the Serbian government. [...] You have to feel the violence to know what it's about". Although this argument was frequently ridiculed in the press, and audience research has shown that viewers rarely saw the film as a national allegory unless specifically directed to this reading, it is common to read A Serbian Film as a loose allegory of 21st-century Serbian history. Aida Vidan argues that it "does not directly address war themes, but is a statement on a traumatized society that has lost its voice and identity" and Featherstone & Johnson argue that it "exposes the real of Serbian ethno-nationalism to the harsh light of day and makes it entirely dominant over normal symbolic reality".

Taxidermia can be read as an allegory of Hungarian history, with its three sections corresponding loosely to fascist, socialist, and capitalist periods in the country's past, and how different members of a family come to terms with this political context. György Kalmár argues that the visceral and affectively challenging imagery in the film is about exploring the specifically local character of Hungarian history: Taxidermia evokes a "culturally specific, local sensorium to undermine the ideologically laden grand narratives of a homogenized, official History". Similarly, Steven Shaviro connects the film's depiction of bodies with broader ideas of history: "these body-images are immediately visceral, and indeed disgusting; and yet they are also abstract and allegorical".

Some scholars have compared this concern with national politics with representations of the nation in new French horror, sometimes called 'border horror' and 'Sarkozy horror' by critics. As Alice Haylett Bryan has noted, images of riots in several French horror films are "representative of a much wider political seam that runs through French horror cinema of this period. Initial scholarly writing on these films was quick to position them in relation to French society, providing readings of the films as expressing fears surrounding immigration and the loss of French cultural identity due to the influx of foreign Others".

=== Spectatorship ===
Some writers who are positive about new extreme films and see ethical or political value in them see the films deploying an engaged mode of spectatorship. They suggest that new extreme films are ethically/politically engaged because they aggressively destabilize dominant interpretations of sex and violence, and because they challenge spectators to look at the world differently. They argue that the disturbing and uncomfortable experience of watching new extreme films is a means by which the films transform ways of seeing—spectatorship is ethical.

For instance, the depiction of sex in Twentynine Palms has been read as revealing 'alternative, non-pornographic ways of being sexual' and thereby creates a 'productive estrangement' from mainstream and pornographic modes of spectatorship. Baise-moi has been read as presenting "a desire that operates subversively alongside rather than outside of the (masculine) imaginary", while the films of Catherine Breillat are seen as disrupting "the relations of distance and control, on which viewing has been seen to depend, by her emphasis on the tactile". Films such as Irréversible, Fat Girl, Trouble Every Day, A New Life, Antichrist, and The Idiots have all been read in this way by scholars, suggesting that spectatorship itself can be seen as a central thematic concern for new extreme films.

=== Unclear and problematic political positions ===
New extreme films do not appear to reflect a unified social or political platform. It is not clear whether they are politically progressive or reactionary, with many critics and scholars disagreeing on the question. Joan Hawkins summarizes audience responses to new extreme films, suggesting that, like many critics,

"Quandt cannot decide whether they have more in common with the "épater les bourgeois" spirit of the French Surrealists or with the work of the right-wing anarchist hussards of the 1950s. That is, he cannot determine whether the films of these new cinematic provocateurs align politically with the Left or with the Right, whether they are culturally progressive or reactionary. In a sense, like many of the horror films Robin Wood discusses, they are both, and it is perhaps this imbrication — or perhaps dialectic — of liberal and conservative tendencies which makes the films so deeply troubling".

Scholars have also frequently pointed to the difficulty of pinning down the political viewpoints because within the films themselves, the different political or philosophical perspectives are not coherent and clearly linked. Writing about Twentynine Palms, Nikolaj Lübecker suggests that "instead of being a rich and multi-layered film, Twentynine Palms is a raw and edgy one. Instead of watching a work in which the three strands [political, physical, metaphysical] organically combine, we experience an implosion of meaning". Lübecker suggests that new extreme films are 'doubly transgressive', because they are first transgressive in terms of their challenging sexual and violent imagery, and then subsequently transgressive because this challenge to the spectator does not appear to serve a straightforwardly 'emancipatory agenda'.

Some films have also been criticized as politically reactionary. Irreversible has been criticized as "the most homophobic movie ever made", Fat Girl and A Serbian Film were cut in the UK for problematic images of child sexual abuse, and A New Life was criticized for its aestheticization of sexual violence and human trafficking. Catherine Breillat is also well-known for her claims about gender, such as the voiceover in Romance saying that "women are capable of much more love than men", while in interviews, Breillat has claimed that "women, they truly love men. I'm not sure that men ever love women".

== Controversy ==
Several films associated with the New French Extremity have generated significant controversy upon their premieres, such as Trouble Every Day, Irreversible, and Twentynine Palms, which prompted walkouts among audience members.

Baise-moi was protested against in France by religious groups, leading to a de facto ban on it by the Culture Minister, a decision that itself was then protested by filmmakers, resulting in the introduction of a new '18' certificate to cater just for the film. Baise-moi was also subject to controversy in many countries because it included visible penetration in an early rape scene—in the UK, this scene was cut by the BBFC until the decision was overturned in 2013.

Critical controversy is a key aspect of new extreme films: while individual films are liked more or less by audiences, they have received a huge amount of attention in the press, in cinephile forums, from academics, and on discussion boards. Mattias Frey argues that for extreme cinema, it is less important to look at exactly what reviewers say; "much more decisive is the sheer amount of coverage: the more exposure, whether positive or negative, the more value a film accrues". For instance, Irreversible provoked substantial critical debate on its release, with many both praising and criticizing the film sometimes even within the same publication: "in journals as diverse as Sight and Sound, in England, and Positif, in France, critics such as Mark Kermode, Nick James, Philippe Rouyer, and Gregory Valens literally sparred in print, damning or acclaiming the qualities of Noe's feature. One faction demanded censure for an amoral treatment of sexual violence; the opposing group called for artistic freedom for an uncompromising portrait of social and sexual dysfunction. Compromise was neither asked for nor given".

== Censorship ==
Many new extreme films have been censored around the world. Baise-moi was cut in many countries to remove images of penetration during a rape scene, and a gun being inserted into a man's anus, and was banned elsewhere for its overall pornographic nature. A Serbian Film was banned and cut in many countries for its inclusion of (fictionalized) child sexual abuse imagery. Fat Girl was cut in some jurisdictions because of its final rape scene that appears to show a child accepting and condoning their own rape.

Critics called for some films to be banned, calling them immoral, or decrying them as lacking artistry. Baise-moi was criticized for its sexual content and for being of poor quality. Irreversible was subject to criticism as 'pornographic' and 'snuff' with the implication that it should not be passed by classification boards. Graphic sexual imagery, especially that from Breillat in Romance, Anatomy of Hell, and Fat Girl, as well as the mixing of sex and violence in Twentynine Palms and Trouble Every Day, was also heavily criticized by critics at the time.

== Relation to new French horror ==
Contemporary French horror films that have sometimes been associated with the idea of extremity include Sheitan, Them, High Tension, Frontier(s), Inside, and Martyrs. The Belgian, French-language film Calvaire has also been associated with this trend.

Unlike new extreme films, new French horror emphasizes gory violence, torture, and monstrous others. There is often an individual or a group who constitutes the violent monster against which the protagonists must struggle, with death and injury following the main characters until the end of the film, when they either escape or are defeated by the evil enemy. These films include many horror tropes such as the monstrous or charactered other, the final girl, home invasions, isolated locales, and torture. They are similar to 'torture porn' or 'spectacle horror' films such as the Saw series and director Eli Roth's Hostel, with Steve Jones identifying Martyrs and Frontier(s) as a form of 'European torture porn', that functions as a response to American depictions of torture.

== Legacy and influence ==
Many critics and scholars have prophesied the end of extreme cinema. There was a high point of production of new extreme films between 1999 and 2010, with waning interest from funding bodies, especially in France, for this type of graphic content in the 2010s, but several new extreme films were made in the 2010s to 2020s such as The Tribe, Titane, Climax, and Holiday. In the 2020s, there remains significant critical and scholarly interest in extreme cinema, with many books and articles still being written about the phenomenon.

== See also ==
- Art horror
- Theatre of Cruelty
- Extreme cinema
- Cinema of Transgression
