= Irréversible =

2002 French film

- Theatrical release poster
- Directed by: Gaspar Noé
- Written by: Gaspar Noé
- Produced by: Brahim Chioua; Vincent Cassel
- Starring: Monica Bellucci; Vincent Cassel; Albert Dupontel
- Cinematography: Benoît Debie; Gaspar Noé
- Edited by: Gaspar Noé
- Music by: Thomas Bangalter
- Production companies: Les Cinémas de la Zone; StudioCanal
- Distributed by: Mars Distribution
- Release date: 22 May 2002 (France)
- Running time: 97 minutes (original); 86 minutes (Straight Cut)
- Country: France
- Languages: French; English; Italian; Spanish; Portuguese (Brazil)
- Budget: €4.6 million
- Box office: €5.8 million

Irréversible (French: [iʁevɛʁsibl]) is a 2002 French art thriller film written, directed, and edited by Gaspar Noé, who also served as co-cinematographer with Benoît Debie. It depicts the events of one night in Paris as two men (Vincent Cassel and Albert Dupontel) attempt to avenge the brutal rape and beating of the woman they love (Monica Bellucci).

The film is made up of a title sequence followed by 14 segments made to look like long takes, each of which is either a continuous shot or a series of shots digitally composited to resemble a continuous shot. The story is told in reverse order.

Theatrically released in France, the United Kingdom and the United States, Irréversible competed for the Palme d'Or at the 2002 Cannes Film Festival where around 200 people walked out of the screening. It won the Bronze Horse at the Stockholm International Film Festival. Critical reception was polarised, with praise towards the performances and Noé's direction, but criticism towards its graphic portrayal of violence and rape. American film critic Roger Ebert called Irréversible "a movie so violent and cruel that most people will find it unwatchable".

A recut version of the film putting the narration in chronological order, Irreversible: Straight Cut (French: Irréversible – Inversion intégrale), was screened in 2019 at the 76th annual Venice International Film Festival. This was later released in US theatres on a limited run in 2023.

== Plot ==
"Time destroys everything" (French: "Le temps détruit tout").

— The film's main message which appears at the end of the original cut
when the movie transitions to a strobe effect.

"Time reveals everything" (French: "Le temps révèle tout").

— In the Straight Cut, this variant message appears at the end of the film.

Alex and Marcus, a young couple, wake up together and discuss their relationship, as well as an upcoming party, while in the nude. Marcus voices concern about Alex's ex, Pierre, also being invited because he "stole his girl", to which Alex responds that he did not steal anything, because she is not an object and it was all her decision. Alex reveals she had a dream of herself standing in a red tunnel that breaks in two. The two talk about a potential pregnancy and Marcus expresses hope in one before Alex takes a pregnancy test, the result of which is never shown, but she seems particularly pleased with.

On a public train, Pierre, Alex's ex who is also invited to the party, constantly bickers with Alex over his inability to satisfy her during their relationship, while Marcus shows no interest in their squabble. Alex explains to Pierre that he always focused too much on her, and a sexual partner can feel and is aroused by their partner's pleasure. At the party, Marcus gets drunk and takes cocaine, much to Alex's disapproval. She leaves the party, asking Pierre to look after Marcus. Alex descends into a red pedestrian underpass on her way back to the train when she notices a transgender prostitute getting attacked by a man. He immediately turns his attention to Alex, anally raping her before savagely beating her into unconsciousness.

After Marcus and Pierre discover Alex being taken away by paramedics, they encounter street criminals Mourad and Layde, who offer to help them find the culprit. They use an ID left at the scene by the prostitute to locate her. Marcus verbally assaults Concha, the prostitute, and threatens to cut her face open in order to gather that the rapist's name is Le Ténia ("the tapeworm") and that he frequents a gay BDSM club called Rectum. The men are chased off by other prostitutes; Marcus and Pierre jump into a taxi cab and speed off into the night. When the cab driver doesn't know where Rectum is, Marcus attacks the driver, stealing his vehicle. The two end up finding the club's location, with Pierre reluctantly following behind Marcus. Leading the charge, Marcus proceeds to get into a fight with a man he suspects of being Le Ténia, who overpowers him and breaks his arm before attempting to rape him. Pierre comes to his rescue and beats the man to death with a nearby fire extinguisher as the man's companion, the actual rapist, watches in amusement. Marcus is carried out of Rectum on a stretcher while Pierre is arrested by police as Mourad and Layde deride them.

Meanwhile, in a nearby small apartment, a man named the Butcher (Note: First introduced in I Stand Alone.) tells a friend that he was arrested for raping his daughter before dismissing the commotion going on outside.

== Cast ==
- Monica Bellucci as Alex
- Vincent Cassel as Marcus
- Albert Dupontel as Pierre
- Jo Prestia as Le Tenia
- Fatima Adoum as Fatima
- Mourad Khima as Mourad
- Hellal as Layde
- Jaramillo as Concha
- Michel Gondoin as Mick
- Jean-Louis Costes as Fistman
- Philippe Nahon as the Butcher
- Stéphane Drouot as the Butcher's friend

Director Gaspar Noé has a cameo as one of the Rectum patrons.

== Production ==
=== Development and pre-production ===
Irréversible was originally titled Danger. Gaspar Noé first found financing for the new title after he pitched the story to be told in reverse, in order to capitalize on the popularity of Christopher Nolan's film Memento (2000). He has also attributed his ability to get funding to the celebrity status of lead actors Monica Bellucci and Vincent Cassel (who were married at the time). Noé has cited several films as influences for Irréversible including Betrayal (1983), for its reverse chronology, In the Realm of the Senses (1976), I Am Cuba (1964), A Clockwork Orange (1971), Straw Dogs (1971), Deliverance (1972), and Death Wish (1974). The film was produced in part by StudioCanal.

Noé says he had met Bellucci and Cassel at parties and that "they were so madly in love at that time that they were almost asking people..., 'Do you have an idea for us to play in a movie together?'" He originally asked them to be a part of the film project that would later become Love, but they didn't want to do the explicit sex scenes. Cassel said, "We thought about it, and he showed us lots of films with explicit sex in them like Intimacy, l'Histoire d'O, and In the Realm of the Senses. And finally it was getting very complicated and we said no." Noé then pivoted and suggested a "rape-revenge movie backward," and they agreed. Cassel ended up as a co-producer on the film and stated that, originally, Noé wanted to purchase the rights to remake the 1983 film Betrayal, but couldn't.

The film was conceived in reverse chronological order but shot in chronological order in the summer of 2001. The script only had three pages with each of the twelve scenes taking up about one-quarter of a page. None of the scenes had written dialogue. They only had six weeks to film because Bellucci had to start production on The Matrix Reloaded in September 2001.

=== Filming ===
Irréversible was shot using a widescreen lightweight Minima Super16 mm camera and was later blown up to 35 mm with most of the camerawork done by Noé himself. The film consists of about a dozen apparently unbroken shots melded together from hundreds of shots. This included the infamous nine-minute-long rape scene, portrayed in a single, unbroken shot.

Noé said he had no idea how long the rape scene was going to last, as this was determined by Monica Bellucci, who essentially directed the scene, and Jo Prestia, a professional French boxer, who played her assailant. When asked directly why it had to be so long, Noé responded, "That is simply as long as it might last in real life. Sometimes you hear stories of someone being raped for half an hour. It seemed the normal timing for the situation." The rape scene was shot six times over two days, each take being one shot from a fixed camera. There was no intimacy coordinator involved given this profession didn't yet exist. Bellucci reportedly watched the films I Spit on Your Grave and Deliverance before shooting. Vincent Cassel said he wanted to be present during the shooting of the rape scene as moral support, but Bellucci didn't want him there. According to Cassel, "She said there was no reason to be there, and that it would be harder for the actor to work if I was. So I went to the southwest of France to surf." Bellucci has expressed no issues with filming the rape scene. She has said that after shooting, she would sit down, have a cup of coffee, and think about something else. It was shot in a real Paris underpass, known to be frequented by prostitutes, which has since been destroyed. The dress worn by Monica Bellucci throughout the film was made by Yves Saint Laurent and was modeled after a green silk dress that Bellucci owned. They made ten copies of the dress since it was destroyed during every take of the rape scene.

The fire extinguisher scene was inspired by a VHS documentary Noé had bought in England called Executions, which supposedly showed real footage of the different methods of capital punishment. According to Noé, one scene showed a man screaming with half his head missing. He said, "I couldn’t believe that someone with half his brains out wasn’t dead or that it would take so long to die. I was really shocked by that image....So for Irreversible I gave that tape to my visual effects guy, and said, 'how could we do this?'"

Many of the actors in the film were nonprofessionals. For example, according to Noé, the "two guys who say, 'revenge is a human right.' Those were the guys doing security for my movie. It’s funny, you start talking with people and they find their own words, their own ideas." Much of the acting throughout the film is improvised, but notably two scenes were thoroughly rehearsed: the kicking of Bellucci's character's head in the rape scene and the murder scene with the fire extinguisher. Noé said that he would show footage of the rape scene to Cassel and Dupontel before shooting the revenge scenes to help them "get crazy."

There were apparently multiple endings of the film: one more explicative and one more emotional. The emotional ending is the one that ended up being chosen.

Noé stated in interviews that during the production of the film he used cocaine in order to help him carry the large cameras needed to capture the rotating shots in the film. He also said the only difficult scene to film was the party scene, which took twenty takes.

Noé has said his decision to include the Butcher, the protagonist from I Stand Alone, in the beginning of Irréversible was inspired by Stanley Kubrick. Noé said, "I read a book about Kubrick, and it said that he liked to use something from one film in the beginning of another. I liked the idea of that, as if there was a commercial in between, and then you pick up where you left off." There is also a nod to Kubrick in the posters seen in the apartment of the characters played by Bellucci and Cassel. Hanging above Bellucci's character's bed is a rare 2001: A Space Odyssey poster, and on the dresser is a half-sheet from Kubrick's 1956 film The Killing.

=== Post-production ===
Computer-generated imagery was used in post-production for the penis in the rape scene. It was also used in the scene where Pierre beats a man's face and crushes his skull with a fire extinguisher to augment the results, as initial footage using a conventional latex dummy proved unconvincing.

The soundtrack was created by Thomas Bangalter (of Daft Punk). During the first thirty minutes, in the club scene, the music is designed to sound as if there were two different tracks playing at two different levels to imitate real clubs. Then, an extremely low-frequency sound of 27 Hz (a sound which police use to stop riots) was added to create a state of nausea and anxiety in the audience. The sound is not immediately perceptible to the spectator but is powerful enough to evoke a physical response. Noé said, "You can't hear them, but they make you shiver. In a good cinema with a good audio system, the sound can scare you much more than what's happening on the screen." This technique, called Sensurround, involves the intentional use of a sub-audible sound to enhance the spectator's experience of a movie, in this case, deliberately making them uncomfortable (although this would only be experienced in a cinema setting as most home speakers would not emit such low frequencies).

== Release ==
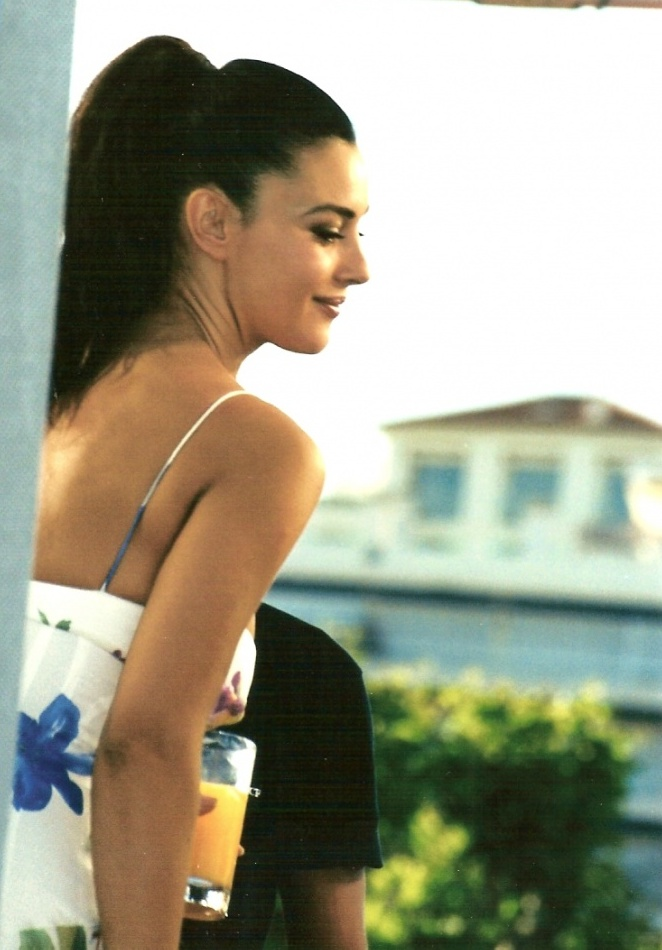
Bellucci at the 2002 Cannes Film Festival

The film premiered in France on 22 May 2002 through Mars Distribution. Persons under the age of 16 were prohibited from attending. It competed at the 2002 Cannes Film Festival. It was released in the United Kingdom on 31 January 2003 through Metro Tartan Distribution, and the United States on 7 March 2003 through Lions Gate Films. It grossed $792,200 from theatrical screenings.

Irreversible: Straight Cut (French: Irréversible – Inversion intégrale) first screened at the 2019 Venice International Film Festival after Noe decided to give this version of the film a wider release instead of relegating it to a home release special feature. It was released in Los Angeles and New York City on 10 February 2023.

== Reception and legacy ==
Critical response to the film was divided, with some critics panning the film and others considering it one of the year's best. The film holds an approval rating of 60% based on 129 reviews at Rotten Tomatoes, with an average rating of 6.10/10. The website's critics' consensus states: "Though well-filmed, Irréversible feels gratuitous in its extreme violence." On metacritic the film has a score of 51% based 38 critic reviews indicating "mixed or average reviews."

The film received three votes in the 2012 Sight & Sound critics' poll of the greatest films and in 2016 was listed by critic Andreas Borcholte as one of the ten best films since 2000.

Audience reactions to both the rape scene and the murder scene have ranged from appreciation of their artistic merits to leaving the theater in disgust. Newsweek's David Ansen stated that "If outraged viewers (mostly women) at the Cannes Film Festival are any indication, this will be the most walked-out-of movie of 2003." In the same review, Ansen suggested that the film displayed "an adolescent pride in its own ugliness". It was reported that around 200 people walked out of the Cannes screening, and local emergency services had to administer oxygen to twenty people who fainted during it. Vincent Cassel said his brother stood up in the middle of the Cannes screening and shouted expletives directed at Gaspar Noé. It didn't win a single prize at the festival.

American film critic Roger Ebert of The Chicago Sun-Times awarded the film three stars out of a possible four. Ebert declared many viewers would find the film unwatchable due to the graphic violence, but he also proposed the film's structure makes it inherently moral rather than an exploitation film: "By placing the ugliness at the beginning, Gaspar Noe forces us to think seriously about the sexual violence involved."

Film critic David Edelstein argued "Irréversible might be the most homophobic movie ever made." Noé's depiction of gay criminal Le Tenia raping the female lead, Alex, remains the film's most controversial image. In his defense, Noé stated, "I'm not homophobic", noting "I also appear in Irréversible, masturbating at the gay club", as a means of showing "I didn't feel superior to gay people".

Despite the negative press, Noé has stated that Irréversible was his "only commercial success."

Irréversible has been associated with a series of films defined as the cinéma du corps ("cinema of the body"), which according to Tim Palmer includes: an attenuated use of narrative, assaulting and often illegible cinematography, confrontational subject material, and a pervasive sense of social nihilism or despair. Irréversible has also been associated with the New French Extremity movement. Director Damien Chazelle credits the club scene in Irréversible as an influence on his film Babylon.

In 2019, Irreversible: Straight Cut premiered at the Venice Film Festival, an alternate and remastered edit of the film presented in chronological order. On Rotten Tomatoes the film has a 90% approval rating with an average rating of 6.80/10 out of 10 critics.

== Accolades ==
Irréversible won the top award, the Bronze Horse for best film, at the 2002 Stockholm International Film Festival. It was nominated for the Palme d'Or at the 2002 Cannes Film Festival, Best Foreign Language Award by the Film Critics Circle of Australia, and Best Foreign Language Film at the 2003 Online Film Critics Society Awards. It was voted Best Foreign Language Film by the San Diego Film Critics Society, tied with The Barbarian Invasions (Les Invasions barbares), and it won runner-up for Best Foreign-Language Film and runner-up for Best Cinematography at the 2003 Boston Society of Film Critics Awards.

== Works cited ==
- Palmer, Tim (2014). Irreversible. Bloomsbury Publishing. ISBN 978-1350306516.
- Brinkema, Eugenie (2004). "Irréversible: A review". Scope.
- Brinkema, Eugenie (2005). "Rape and the Rectum: Bersani, Deleuze, Noé". Camera Obscura: Feminism, Culture, and Media Studies. 20 (1): 32–57. doi:10.1215/02705346-20-1_58-33.
- Downing, Lisa (2004). "French Cinema's New 'Sexual Revolution': Postmodern Porn and Troubled Genre". French Cultural Studies. 15 (3): 265–280. doi:10.1177/009715580401500305.
- Grønstad, Asbjørn (2011). "On the Unwatchable". In Horeck, T.; Kendall, T. (eds.). The New Extremism in Cinema: From France to Europe. Edinburgh University Press. pp. 192–205. ISBN 978-0748641604.
- Hickin, Daniel (2011). "Censorship, Reception and the Films of Gaspar Noé: The Emergence of New Extremism in Britain.". In Horeck, T.; Kendall, T. (eds.). The New Extremism in Cinema: From France to Europe. Edinburgh University Press. pp. 117–129. ISBN 978-0748641604.
- Keesey, Douglas (2010). "Split identification: Representations of rape in Gaspar Noé's Irréversible and Catherine Breillat's A ma sœur!/Fat Girl". Studies in European Cinema. 7 (2): 95–107. doi:10.1386/seci.7.2.95_1 (inactive 11 October 2025).
- Kenny, Oliver (2022). "Beyond Critical Partisanship: Ethical Witnessing and Long Takes of Sexual Violence". Studies in European Cinema. 19 (2): 164–178. doi:10.1080/17411548.2020.1778846.
