= Love (2015 film) =

2015 French film

- Theatrical release poster
- Directed by: Gaspar Noé
- Written by: Gaspar Noé
- Produced by: Vincent Maraval; Gaspar Noé; Brahim Chioua; Rodrigo Teixeira; Edouard Weil; Genevieve Lemal
- Starring: Aomi Muyock; Karl Glusman; Klara Kristin
- Cinematography: Benoît Debie
- Edited by: Gaspar Noé; Denis Bedlow
- Production companies: Les Cinémas De La Zone; Rectangle Productions; Wild Bunch; RT Features
- Distributed by: Wild Bunch
- Release dates: 20 May 2015 (Cannes); 15 July 2015 (France)
- Running time: 135 minutes
- Country: France
- Language: English
- Budget: €2.55 million ($2.9 million)
- Box office: $861,057

Love is a 2015 French erotic drama art film written and directed by Gaspar Noé. The film marked Noé's fourth directorial venture after a gap of six years. It had its premiere at the 2015 Cannes Film Festival and was released in 3D. The film is notable for its unsimulated sex scenes. The film received mixed reviews.

== Plot ==
Murphy is an American film student living in Paris. On a rainy January morning, he receives a call at the small apartment he shares with Danish partner Omi and their 18-month-old son, Gaspar. The caller is Nora, the mother of his ex-girlfriend Electra, who asks if Murphy knows of her daughter's whereabouts. She hasn't heard from Electra in two months, and is worried, given her issues with depression and previous suicide attempts.

For the rest of this day, Murphy recalls his relationship with Electra in a series of fragmented, nonlinear flashbacks. They depict their first meeting; their quick hook-up; and their lives over the next two years, which are filled with drug abuse, rough sex, Murphy’s infidelity, and tender moments. Murphy and Electra eventually met and had a no-strings-attached threesome with Omi, then a young adolescent, as a way to add some excitement to their love life.

However, Murphy continued his sexual relationship with Omi, without Electra's knowledge. This eventually resulted in an unplanned pregnancy, due to a broken condom. Omi refused to terminate the pregnancy, as she was against abortion due to having been an unplanned child herself. Admitting the truth to Electra ultimately ended her and Murphy's relationship, leading to the present-day set up of Murphy and Omi raising the child together in a loveless relationship. Electra's whereabouts and ultimate fate are left unresolved at the end of the film.

== Cast ==
- Karl Glusman as Murphy
- Aomi Muyock as Electra
- Klara Kristin as Omi
- Ugo Fox as Gaspar (the baby)
- Juan Saavedra as Julio
- Gaspar Noé as Noé
- Isabelle Nicou as Nora
- Vincent Maraval as Castel
- Deborah Revy as Paula
- Stella Rocha as Mama
- Xamira Zuloaga as Lucile
- Benoît Debie as Yuyo
- Omaima S. as Victoire

== Production ==
Initially, Noé wanted the then-married couple Monica Bellucci and Vincent Cassel to play the leads, but they took issue with the explicit, unsimulated sex.

Love is the screen debut of the film's two main actresses, Muyock and Kristin. Noé met them in a club. He found Karl Glusman for the role of Murphy through a mutual friend. The budget of the film was approximately €2.6 million. Principal photography took place in Paris. Noé has said that the film's screenplay was seven pages long.

In a pre-release interview with Marfa Journal, Noé implied that the film would have an explicitly sexual feel. He asserted that it would "give guys a hard-on and make girls cry".

The film is notable for its unsimulated sex scenes. According to NPR, "roughly half of Gaspar Noe's Love consists of raw, unsimulated sex acts – presented in 3D, no less". In most cases, the sex scenes were also not choreographed.

Gaspar Noé said that some of the sex scenes in the film are real while others are simulated. The director also preferred not to reveal which ones were simulated and leave the possibility to the spectators to detect the true from the false. "I think the experience of sex should be represented in all its power - instead of being caricatured as it is too often", he explained before specifying that he also did according to wants and needs of the actors: "I also composed with the limits of the actors. For Karl Glusman (Murphy), the representation of ejaculation was done in a natural way; actresses experience this differently and I respected their limits."

== Release ==
Love was selected to be screened out of competition in the Midnight Screenings section at the 68th Cannes Film Festival, where it had its world premiere on 20 May 2015. The week before its debut at Cannes, the film's U.S. distribution rights were acquired by Alchemy. It was selected to be screened in the Vanguard section of the 2015 Toronto International Film Festival. The film also screened in The International Film Festival of Kerala, held in Thiruvananthapuram, India.

The film was refused a license to be screened in Russia.

== Reception ==
On Rotten Tomatoes, the film holds an approval rating of 42% with an average rating of 5.1/10, based on 96 reviews. The website's critics consensus reads: "Love sees writer-director Gaspar Noé delivering some of his warmest and most personal work; unfortunately, it's also among his most undeveloped and least compelling." On Metacritic, the film has a weighted average score of 51 out of 100, based on 27 critics, indicating "mixed or average" reviews.

Some critics and audiences were shocked by the film's graphic sexual content, including the opening sex scene, which inspired audiences to film their reactions to the opening scene and share them on social media.
