= Benoît Debie =

Belgian cinematographer

- Born: 1968 (age 57–58); Liège, Belgium
- Occupation: Cinematographer
- Years active: 1992–present

Benoît Debie (born 1968) is a Belgian cinematographer, known for his collaborations with Gaspar Noé.

== Career ==
Debie attended the Institut des Arts de Diffusion (IAD), a Belgian film school. After graduating, he worked as a camera assistant before taking up cinematography jobs on various television series. He worked in television for ten years while also shooting short films and advertisements. The first feature film he was involved with as a director of photography was Irréversible, a controversial 2002 film directed by Gaspar Noé. Noé contacted him to shoot the film after seeing Debie's previous work, specifically a short film titled A Wonderful Love (1999) directed by Fabrice Du Welz. Debie's next project was Lucile Hadžihalilović's Innocence (2004), followed by The Card Player (2004), an Italian film directed by Dario Argento, and The Ordeal, another collaboration with Fabrice du Welz. In 2006 he photographed the French feature Locked Out.

Debie went on to film Day Night Day Night, Julia Loktev's first film, released in 2006, before returning to work with his previous collaborators: Vinyan (2008) with Fabrice du Welz and Enter the Void (2009) with Gaspar Noé. In 2010 he was cinematographer on The Runaways, a biopic about Joan Jett's first band, and by 2011 he had finished shooting Adrian Grunberg's action film Get the Gringo. The same year, he was named one of Variety magazine's "10 Cinematographers to Watch". He photographed Harmony Korine's Spring Breakers in 2012—which was nominated for an Independent Spirit Award for Best Cinematography—and Wim Wenders' Every Thing Will Be Fine the following year. In 2013 he was hired by American actor Ryan Gosling (whom Debie had first met in 1998) to shoot Gosling's first film, Lost River, which was filmed in 2013 and premiered at the 2014 Cannes Film Festival.

Debie is a member of the Belgian Society of Cinematographers (SBC).

== Filmography ==
Short film

Year	Title	Director	Notes
1992	La Pureté	Yvan Le Moine	Segment of Les sept péchés capitaux
2008	New York, I Love You	Yvan Attal; Shekhar Kapur	2 segments
2009	Passage	Shekhar Kapur	
2015	Heineken's the Chase	Tom Kuntz	
2023	Modern Jam	Gaspar Noé	Segment of Circus Maximus

Feature film

Year	Title	Director	Notes
2002	Irréversible	Gaspar Noé	Shared credit with Gaspar Noé
2004	The Card Player	Dario Argento	
2004	The Ordeal	Fabrice Du Welz	
2004	Innocence	Lucile Hadžihalilović	
2006	Locked Out	Albert Dupontel	
2006	Day Night Day Night	Julia Loktev	
2007	Joshua	George Ratliff	
2008	Vinyan	Fabrice Du Welz	
2009	Enter the Void	Gaspar Noé	
2009	Carriers	Àlex Pastor; David Pastor	
2010	The Runaways	Floria Sigismondi	
2012	Get the Gringo	Adrian Grünberg	
2012	Spring Breakers	Harmony Korine	
2014	Lost River	Ryan Gosling	
2014	Colt 45	Fabrice du Welz	
2015	Every Thing Will Be Fine	Wim Wenders	
2015	Love	Gaspar Noé	Also made a cameo as "Yuyo"
2016	The Dancer	Stéphanie Di Giusto	
2016	The Beautiful Days of Aranjuez	Wim Wenders	
2017	Submergence	Wim Wenders	
2018	Climax	Gaspar Noé	
2018	The Sisters Brothers	Jacques Audiard	
2019	The Beach Bum	Harmony Korine	
2019	Lux Æterna	Gaspar Noé	
2021	Vortex	Gaspar Noé	
2023	Seneca – On the Creation of Earthquakes	Robert Schwentke	
2026	Outcome	Jonah Hill	
2026	Karma	Guillaume Canet	
2027	Nana	Olivier Dahan	

Documentary film

Year	Title	Director	Note
2016	One More Time with Feeling	Andrew Dominik	Shared credit with Alwin H. Küchler
2025	Something Beautiful	Miley Cyrus; Jacob Bixenman; Brendan Walter	Concert film

Music video

Year	Title	Director	Artist
2013	"Who Do We Think We Are"	Paul Gore	John Legend
2015	"Bitch Better Have My Money"	Megaforce; Rihanna; Leo Berne	Rihanna
2018	"Apeshit"	Ricky Saiz	Beyoncé; Jay-Z
2025	"Big Sleep"	Gaspar Noé	The Weeknd

== Awards and nominations ==
Lumière Awards

Year	Category	Title	Result
2016	Best Cinematography	The Dancer	Nominated
2018	Best Cinematography	Climax	Nominated
2018	Best Cinematography	The Sisters Brothers	Nominated

Magritte Awards

Year	Category	Title	Result
2016	Best Cinematography	The Dancer	Nominated
2018	Best Cinematography	The Sisters Brothers	Nominated

Other awards

Year	Award	Category	Title	Result
2012	Independent Spirit Awards	Best Cinematography	Spring Breakers	Nominated
2018	César Awards	Best Cinematography	The Sisters Brothers	Won
