= Gaspar Noé =

Argentine filmmaker (born 1963)

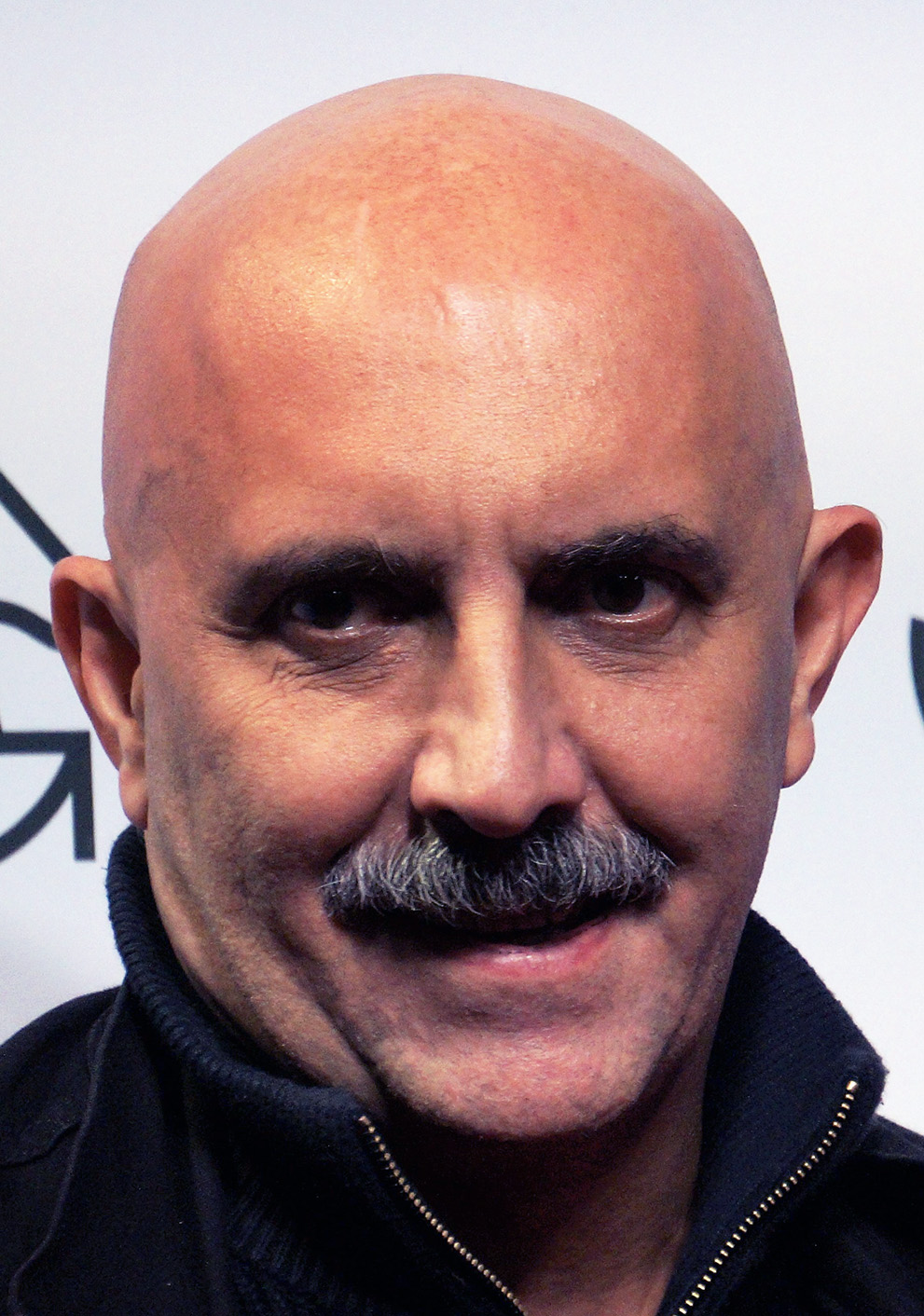
- Noé in 2021
- Born: Gaspar Julio Noé Murphy; 27 December 1963 (age 62); Buenos Aires, Argentina
- Citizenship: Argentina; Italy
- Education: École nationale supérieure Louis-Lumière
- Occupations: Film director; screenwriter; film editor; cinematographer; film producer
- Years active: 1985–present
- Style: Psychological fiction; drama; fantasy; horror; thriller
- Partner: Lucile Hadžihalilović (1985–present)
- Father: Luis Felipe Noé

Gaspar Julio Noé Murphy (born 27 December 1963), known professionally as Gaspar Noé, (Note: Spanish: [gasˈpaɾ noˈe]; French: [ɡaspaʁ nɔ.e]) is an Argentine filmmaker and screenwriter, who lives and works primarily in France. He is one of the primary exponents of New French Extremity, associated with its graphic nature of unsimulated sex, drugs, epilepsy, and violence.

As of 2026, he has directed seven feature films, I Stand Alone (1998), Irréversible (2002), Enter the Void (2009), Love (2015), Climax (2018), Lux Æterna (2019), and Vortex (2021).

== Early life and education ==
Gaspar Julio Noé Murphy was born on 27 December 1963 in Buenos Aires, Argentina to Luis Felipe Noé, a prominent Argentine artist, writer, and intellectual of Italian descent, and Nora Murphy, a social worker of Irish descent. He has a sister named Paula. Noé moved to New York City with his parents, and resided on Bleecker Street in Greenwich Village. Noé returned to Argentina at the age of 5 and emigrated to France in 1976 to escape the military dictatorship occurring in Argentina at the time. Noé obtained Italian citizenship from lineage, and is a dual-citizen of Argentina and Italy, but does not consider himself Italian.

Noé initially wanted to become a cartoonist, but became interested in filmmaking after his father gifted him a Super 8 camera that he bought in a Brazilian airport. Noé shot a reel with his best friend Juan Diego Solanas jumping from the Pont Neuf. He graduated from the École nationale supérieure Louis-Lumière in Paris. Following his graduation in 1982, he worked as an assistant director on Fernando Solanas's Tangos, the Exile of Gardel (1986) and Sur (1988). Noé's first officially released short film Carne premiered in 1991.

== Career ==
=== Collaborations ===
Noé and French filmmaker Lucile Hadžihalilović have repeatedly collaborated with each other on film projects since 1987. In the early 1990s, Noé co-founded the production company Les Cinémas de la Zone with Hadžihalilović. Noé operated the camera and was the cinematographer for two short films directed by Hadžihalilović: La Bouche de Jean-Pierre (1996) and Good Boys Use Condoms (1998). Similarly, Hadžihalilović produced and edited Carne (1991), edited Seul contre tous (1998), and was credited as a writer on Enter the Void (2009). The creative collaboration is made clear in the comparable stylistic choices across these early films, most clearly the credit sequences and the marketing designs. In 2025, Noé portrayed a film director in Hadžihalilović's fourth feature film, The Ice Tower.

Three of his films feature the character of a nameless butcher played by Philippe Nahon: Carne, I Stand Alone, and, in a cameo, Irréversible.

All of Noé's feature films are shot by cinematographer Benoît Debie.

The music for Irréversible was composed by Thomas Bangalter. The latter also sent Noé an unreleased song he made circa 1995 for Climax. The song was named "Sangria" in reference to the movie.

In collaboration with Saint Laurent, he directed films Lux Æterna and Saint Laurent - Summer of '21.

=== Style, themes, and influences ===
Noé's work has been strongly associated with a collection of films often described as new extreme films. Highlighting their challenging sexual and violent bodily imagery, Tim Palmer has described them as part of a cinéma du corps (cinema of the body), and a cinema of "brutal intimacy" because of its attenuated use of narrative, generally assaulting and often illegible cinematography, confrontational subject material, a treatment of sexual behavior as violent rather than mutually intimate, and a pervasive sense of social nihilism or despair.

Noé often directly addresses the audience in confrontational ways, most notably in I Stand Alone, when an intertitle warns the audience that they have 30 seconds to leave the cinema before the final violent climax. In a different way, this can be seen in Irreversible, in which the 10-minute long single-take rape sequence has frequently been read as an assault on viewers, as well as a depiction of an assault on the female character. Noé stated in the September 2012 edition of Sight & Sound magazine that seeing 2001: A Space Odyssey at the age of seven changed his life, an experience without which he would never have become a director. A poster for the film features notably in a scene towards the end of Irreversible. He also credits his mother for taking him to see other transgressive films as a child, including one by Fassbinder, and cites the skeleton fight scene from Jason and the Argonauts as a core memory from his youth.

Many of his movies feature all kind of film posters, which reflects his collection and passion for them. He is believed to be the owner of one of the three known copies of the rarest poster for the 1931 film M. Since Irréversible, he's kept working with French film poster designer Laurent Lufroy for all his feature films: Lufroy even appears in Love (as a policeman), Climax (as a dog-handler), and Lux Æterna (using a torch).

Additional influences cited by Noé include the French photographer Pierre Molinier, the Japanese director Koji Wakamatsu (particularly the film The Embryo Hunts in Secret), Spanish-Mexican filmmaker Luis Buñuel (particularly the films Un Chien Andalou and Los Olvidados), David Lynch's Eraserhead, Le Professeur Choron (the founder of Hara Kiri magazine), and Argentinian painter Jorge De La Vega (who is also Noé's godfather).

Many specific scenes and filmmaking decision from Noé's work were inspired by films. The warning in I Stand Alone was influenced by the film Homicidal (1961). Irreversible was inspired by the film Betrayal (1983), for its reverse chronology, as well as the films In the Realm of the Senses (1976), I Am Cuba (1964), A Clockwork Orange (1971), Straw Dogs (1971), Deliverance (1972), and Death Wish (1974). The POV camera in Enter the Void was inspired by Lady in the Lake (1947). Additionally, the use of 3D in Love was inspired by Gravity.

Noé also cites the 1983 Austrian serial killer film, Angst, by Gerald Kargl, and Martin Scorsese's Taxi Driver as additional influences. He has said De Niro's performance in Raging Bull was his "favorite male performance ever."

One of Noé's favorite books is An Experiment with Time by J. W. Dunne.

== Personal life ==
Noé has been in a relationship with French filmmaker and frequent collaborator Lucile Hadžihalilović since 1985, after meeting on the set of Noé's first short film, Tintarella di Luna. Some sources say that Noé and Hadžihalilović are married, but Noé refers to Hadžihalilović as "my girlfriend" and "my life partner" in interviews.

Noé considered Hadžihalilović's father as his second father. He also considered actor Philippe Nahon and film director Fernando Solanas as father figures to him. Their close deaths and also Noé's experiences dealing with his mother's dementia, as well as Noé being diagnosed with a brain hemorrhage that almost killed him in early 2020, inspired Noé to direct the film Vortex (2021).

Noé is an atheist.

When questioned about his sexuality he has described himself as "testosterophobic," saying "the male testosterone can be very boring and annoying and repetitive. So mostly in my movies, the girls have the cool parts and the men have the stupid parts." Furthermore, when asked about his thoughts on homosexuality, he stated, "I'm not homophobic. I'm not gay, either. I'm not even bisexual, but I've come close to gay situations in my life.” When asked about abortion, a theme in several of his films, he said, "I'm not pro-life, I'm not pro-choice, I'm not pro-death, I'm not anti-choice. In my personal life, I thought it was much easier to be careful."

=== Health and drug use ===
Throughout his career, Noé has spoken frequently about his experiences with drugs, and his use of substances like ecstasy, datura, LSD, cannabis, DMT, ayahuasca, morphine, amphetamine, poppers, and cocaine. After Noé suffered a near fatal brain hemorrhage in early 2020, he stopped using hard drugs and also quit smoking and drinking hard alcohol.

== Filmography ==
=== Feature films ===
Year	Title	Director	Writer	Producer	Editor	Other notes
1998	I Stand Alone	Yes	Yes	Yes	Yes	
2002	Irréversible	Yes	Yes	No	Yes	Also co-cinematographer with Benoît Debie
2009	Enter the Void	Yes	Yes	No	Yes	
2015	Love	Yes	Yes	Yes	Yes	
2018	Climax	Yes	Yes	No	Yes	
2019	Lux Æterna	Yes	Yes	Yes	No	
2021	Vortex	Yes	Yes	No	No	

=== Short films ===
- Tintarella di luna (1984)
- Pulpe amère (1987)
- Carne (1991)
- Une expérience d'hypnose télévisuelle (1995)
- Sodomites (1998)
- Intoxication (2002)
- Eva (2005)
- We Fuck Alone (2006) segment of Destricted
- SIDA (2008) segment of 8
- Ritual (2011) segment of 7 Days in Havana
- Shoot (2014) segment of Short Plays
- The Art of Filmmaking (2019)
- Saint Laurent – Summer of '21 (2020)

=== Music videos ===
- Animal Collective - "Applesauce"
- Arielle – "Je Suis si Mince"
- Bone Fiction – "Insanely Cheerful"
- Nick Cave and the Bad Seeds – "We No Who U R"
- Placebo – "Protège-moi"
- SebastiAn – "Love in Motion"
- SebastiAn – "Thirst"
- Thomas Bangalter – "Outrage" and "Stress" (both from the Irréversible soundtrack)
- Travis Scott – "Modern Jam" (Segment of Circus Maximus)
- The Weeknd – "Big Sleep"

=== Other production credits ===
Year	Title	Credit
1985	Tangos, the Exile of Gardel	Assistant Director
1988	Sur	Assistant Director
1996	La Bouche de Jean-Pierre	Cinematographer
1998	Good Boys Use Condoms	Camera Operator
2016	The End	Trailer Editor

=== Acting roles ===
Year	Title	Role	Director	Note
1984	Tintarella di Luna	A teenager from the village.	Himself	Short film, made while at Louis Lumiere College
1985	Tangos, the Exile of Gardel	Maria's boyfriend.	Fernando Solanas	Short appearance, he doesn't talk in the movie. He was also the Assistant Director.
1995	Cinématon n°1749	Himself	Gérard Courant	
1996	Le Rocher d'Acapulco	Sandrine's brother	Laurent Tuel	Gaspar Noé doesn't appear on-screen but his voice is used in a phone call scene.
1996	Je suis ton Châtiment	The homeless	Guillaume Bréaud	Shortfilm made for Canal+. Starring Denis Podalydès in the leading role, Albert Dupontel, Marc Caro and original soundtrack by John Powell
1997	Dobermann	Kebab seller	Jan Kounen	
2002	Irréversible	A client from the club	Himself	
2009	Enter the Void	Alex	Himself	Alex is a character played by Cyril Roy. But in a nightmare scene, there is a brief moment during which Gaspar Noé is dressed up as Cyril Roy's character.
2013	9 Month Stretch	A prisoner	Albert Dupontel	Cameo alongside Jan Kounen.
2015	Love	Noé, the Gallery Owner	Himself	Credited as Aron Pages, which is an anagram of his own name.
2020	Mon Cousin	A patient	Jan Kounen	Cameo alongside Albert Dupontel.
2022	Three in the Drift of the Creative Act	Himself	Fernando Solanas	Posthumous documentary in which director Fernando Solanas, Luis Felipe Noé, both of their sons (respectively Juan Solanas and Gaspar Noé) and Eduardo Pavlovsky discuss about creating arts.
2023	Dario Argento Panico	Himself	Simone Scafidi	Documentary film
2024	Schirkoa: In Lies We Trust	-	Ishan Shuklan	This feature film is the longer version of Indian shortfilm Schirkoa. Gaspar Noé was announced in the cast in 2021.
2024	Dans la peau de Blanche Houellebecq	Gaspar, the director	Guillaume Nicloux	
2025	The Ice Tower	Dino	Lucile Hadžihalilović	

== Photography ==
Besides being a filmmaker, he is an occasional photographer. In 2013, Noé shot the cover art for American singer-songwriter Sky Ferreira's debut album Night Time, My Time. Other celebrities, such as Agnès b., Todd Solondz, or Stacy Martin were shot by Gaspar Noé, as well as several models for erotic magazines.

== Reputation ==
Many of Noé's films were polarizing or controversial with viewers due to their inclusion of graphic scenes of violence and sexual violence. I Stand Alone, Irreversible, Enter the Void, We Fuck Alone, Love, and Climax were all considered controversial for their challenging sexual and violent imagery.

=== Irreversible ===
Irreversible was hugely divisive amongst critics with journals such as Sight and Sound (UK) and Positif (France) allowing critics to openly voice their disagreements about the film. It caused substantial outrage in many countries for its central scene of rape, filmed in a single take and lasting nearly ten minutes in total, with some critics comparing it to pornography because of its length and the use of a static camera, as well as considering the film as a whole to be deeply homophobic for its hellish portrayal of a gay S&M club. On the other hand, it was also frequently praised for its brutal portrayal of the horrors of rape, and its implicit challenge to viewers of the scene. Eugenie Brinkema, for instance, describes Irreversible as "ethically, generically, subjectively" disruptive: "the rape [...] is real, it is private, it is contained – it is insufferably present. [...] it interrogates vehicles of receptivity and the power and violence done to bodies by bodies".

== Awards and nominations ==
Year	Award	Category	Title	Result
1991	Avignon Film Festival	Prix Tournage	Carne	Won
1991	Cannes Film Festival	SACD Award	Carne	Won
1992	Fantasporto	Best Film	Carne	Nominated
1994	Yubari International Fantastic Film Festival	Minami Toshiko Award / Critic's Award	Carne	Won
1998	Cannes Film Festival	Mercedes-Benz Award	I Stand Alone	Won
1998	Namur International Festival of French-Speaking Film	Golden Bayard	I Stand Alone	Nominated
1998	Molodist International Film Festival	Best Full-Length Fiction Film	I Stand Alone	Nominated
1998	Sitges Film Festival	Best Film	I Stand Alone	Nominated
1998	Sarajevo Film Festival	FIPRESCI Prize	I Stand Alone	Won
1998	Sitges Film Festival	Best Screenplay	I Stand Alone	Won
1998	Stockholm Film Festival	Bronze Horse	I Stand Alone	Nominated
1999	Buenos Aires International Festival of Independent Cinema	Best Film	I Stand Alone	Nominated
2001	Boston Underground Film Festival	Best of Festival	I Stand Alone	Won
2002	Cannes Film Festival	Palme d'Or	Irréversible	Nominated
2002	Stockholm Film Festival	Bronze Horse	Irréversible	Won
2004	Bodil Awards	Best Non-American Film	Irréversible	Nominated
2009	Cannes Film Festival	Palme d'Or	Enter the Void	Nominated
2009	Sitges Film Festival	Special Prize of the Jury	Enter the Void	Won
2009	Sitges Film Festival	Best Film	Enter the Void	Nominated
2015	Cannes Film Festival	Queer Palm	Love	Nominated
2015	Camerimage	Best 3D Film	Love	Won
2018	Cannes Film Festival	Art Cinema Award	Climax	Won
2018	Sitges Film Festival	Best Film	Climax	Won
2022	Dublin International Film Festival	Best Film	Vortex	Won
2022	San Sebastián International Film Festival	Zabaltegi-Tabakalera Prize	Vortex	Won
2022	Ghent International Film Festival	Grand Prix for Best Film	Vortex	Won
2022	Istanbul Film Festival	Golden Tulip for Best Film / FIPRESCI Prize	Vortex	Won

== See also ==
- List of atheists in film, radio, television and theater

== Bibliography ==
- Frey, Mattias. (2016). Extreme Cinema: The Transgressive Rhetoric of Today’s Art Film Culture. Rutgers University Press.
- Horeck, Tanya, & Kendall, Tina. (Eds.). (2011). The New Extremism in Cinema: From France to Europe. Edinburgh University Press.
- Palmer, Tim. (2011). Brutal intimacy: Analyzing Contemporary French cinema. Wesleyan University Press.
- Palmer, Tim. (2015). Irreversible. Palgrave Macmillan.
- Russell, Dominique. (Ed.). (2010). Rape in Art Cinema. Continuum.
