= List of British films of 2023 =

English films

This article lists feature-length British films and full-length documentaries that have their premiere in 2023 and were at least partly produced by the United Kingdom. It does not feature short films, medium-length films, made-for-TV films, pornographic films, filmed theater, VR films or interactive films, nor does it include films screened in previous years that have official release dates in 2023.

== British films box office ==
The highest-grossing UK-qualifying and U.K. independent British films according to the British Film Institute released in 2023, by domestic box office gross revenue, are as follows:

=== In-Year releases ===
Highest-grossing U.K. independent films of 2023
Rank	Title	Distributor	Domestic gross (£m)
1	The Great Escaper	Warner Bros.	£5,310,000
2	What's Love Got to Do with It?	StudioCanal UK	£4,810,000
3	Empire of Light	Disney	£3,870,000
4	Allelujah	Pathé UK/Warner Bros.	£3,690,000
5	The Unlikely Pilgrimage of Harold Fry	EONE FILMS	£3,380,000
6	Sumotherhood	Paramount	£2,450,000
7	The Miracle Club	Lionsgate	£1,920,000
8	Greatest Days	Elysian Film Group	£1,550,000
9	Rye Lane	Walt Disney	£1,230,000
10	The Old Oak	Studiocanal UK	£1,100,000

Highest-grossing U.K. qualifying films of 2023
Rank	Title	Distributor	Domestic gross (£m)
1	Barbie	Warner Bros	£95,600,000
2	Wonka	Warner Bros	£58,400,000
3	The Little Mermaid	Walt Disney	£27,400,000
4	Mission: Impossible – Dead Reckoning Part One	Paramount	£26,600,000
5	Indiana Jones and the Dial of Destiny	Walt Disney	£20,400,000
6	Ant-Man and the Wasp: Quantumania	Walt Disney	£19,300,000
7	Fast X	Universal	£15,300,000
8	Napoleon	Sony	£14,400,000
9	Dungeons & Dragons: Honor Among Thieves	eOne Films	£13,700,000
10	Meg 2: The Trench	Warner Bros	£13,100,000

== Film premieres ==
=== January–March ===
Opening		Title	Cast and crew	Distributor	Ref.
J A N U A R Y	16	Bank of Dave	Director: Chris Foggin; Cast: Joel Fry, Phoebe Dynevor, Rory Kinnear, Hugh Bonneville, Paul Kaye, Jo Hartley	Netflix	
J A N U A R Y	16	Earth Mama	Director: Savanah Leaf; Cast: Tia Nomore, Erika Alexander, Doechii, Keta Price, Olivia Luccardi	A24; Based on The Heart Still Hums by Leaf and Taylor Russell	
J A N U A R Y	19	The Pod Generation	Director: Sophie Barthes; Cast: Emilia Clarke, Chiwetel Ejiofor, Rosalie Craig, Vinette Robinson, Jean-Marc Barr		
J A N U A R Y	21	Polite Society	Director: Nida Manzoor; Cast: Ritu Arya, Priya Kansara	Focus Features	
J A N U A R Y	22	Drift	Director: Anthony Chen; Cast: Cynthia Erivo, Alia Shawkat, Ibrahima Ba, Honor Swinton Byrne		
J A N U A R Y	22	The Deepest Breath	Director: Laura McGann	Netflix	
J A N U A R Y	22	Girl	Director: Adura Onashile; Cast: Déborah Lukumuena, Le'Shantey Bonsu, Danny Sapani, Liana Turner	New Europe Film Sales	
J A N U A R Y	23	Rye Lane	Director: Raine Allen-Miller; Cast: Vivian Oparah, David Jonsson, Alice Hewkin, Munya Chawawa, Simon Manyonda	Searchlight Pictures	
J A N U A R Y	23	Scrapper	Director: Charlotte Regan; Cast: Harris Dickinson, Lola Campbell, Alin Uzun, Cary Crankson		
J A N U A R Y	26	Winnie-the-Pooh: Blood and Honey	Director: Rhys Frake-Waterfield; Cast: Craig David Dowsett, Chris Cordell, Amber Doig-Thorne, Nikolai Leon, Maria Taylor	Altitude Film Distribution; Based on Winnie-the-Pooh by A. A. Milne and E. H. Shepard	
J A N U A R Y	27	Unwelcome	Director: Jon Wright; Cast: Hannah John-Kamen, Douglas Booth	Charades	
F E B R U A R Y	7	One Year Off	Director: Philippe Martinez; Cast: Jeff Fahey, Nathalie Cox, Chad Michael Collins, Ray Fearon	Grindstone Entertainment Group	
F E B R U A R Y	18	A Greyhound of a Girl	Director: Enzo D'Alò; Cast: Brendan Gleeson, Sharon Horgan, Mia O'Connor, Charlene McKenna, Rosaleen Linehan	Dazzler Media	
F E B R U A R Y	19	Femme	Directors: Sam H. Freeman, Ng Choon Ping; Cast: Nathan Stewart-Jarrett, George Mackay	Signature Entertainment	
F E B R U A R Y	19	Silver Haze	Director: Sacha Polak; Cast: Vicky Knight, Esmé Creed-Miles, Charlotte Knight, Archie Brigden, Angela Bruce	BFI	
F E B R U A R Y	22	The Strays	Director: Nathaniel Martello-White; Cast: Ashley Madekwe, Bukky Bakray, Jorden Myrie	Netflix	
F E B R U A R Y	24	Luther: The Fallen Sun	Director: Jamie Payne; Cast: Idris Elba, Cynthia Erivo, Andy Serkis	Netflix	
M A R C H	1	Bolan's Shoes	Director: Ian Puleston-Davies; Cast: Timothy Spall, Leanne Best, Mark Lewis Jones, Mathew Horne	Munro Films	
M A R C H	11	Little Bone Lodge	Director: Matthias Hoene; Cast: Joely Richardson, Sadie Soverall, Neil Linpow, Harry Cadby	Signature Entertainment	
M A R C H	12	Raging Grace	Director: Paris Zarcilla; Cast: Max Eigenmann, Leanne Best, David Hayman, Jaeden Paige Boadilla	Brainstorm	
M A R C H	15	Tetris	Director: Jon S. Baird; Cast: Taron Egerton, Nikita Efremov, Roger Allam, Anthony Boyle, Togo Igawa, Toby Jones, Ken Yamamura, Ben Miles, Matthew Marsh	Apple TV+	
M A R C H	15	Wait For Me	Director: Keith Farrell; Cast: Karen Hassan, Aaron Cobham, Sean McGinley, Elva Trill, Neil Bell, Rebecca Atkinson	Munro Films	
M A R C H	18	Polarized	Director: Shamim Sarif; Cast: Holly Deveaux, Maxine Denis	Blue Denim Films, Echo Lake Entertainment, Enlightenment Productions, Julijette (Canada-UK coproduction)	
M A R C H	19	Phantom Parrot	Director: Kate Stonehill		

=== April–June ===
Opening		Title	Cast and crew	Distributor	Ref.
A P R I L	14	The Last Kingdom: Seven Kings Must Die	Director: Edward Bazalgette; Cast: Alexander Dreymon, Harry Gilby, Mark Rowley, Arnas Fedaravicius	Netflix	
A P R I L	19	Coldplay – Music of the Spheres: Live at River Plate	Director: Paul Dugdale; Cast: Guy Berryman, Jonny Buckland, Will Champion, Golshifteh Farahani, H.E.R., Jin, Chris Martin	Trafalgar Releasing	
A P R I L	28	The Unlikely Pilgrimage of Harold Fry	Director: Hettie Macdonald; Cast: Jim Broadbent, Penelope Wilton, Linda Bassett, Joseph Mydell	Entertainment One	
M A Y	17	Occupied City	Director: Steve McQueen	20th Century Studios; Based on Atlas of an Occupied City, Amsterdam 1940-1945 by Bianca Stigter	
M A Y	19	How to Have Sex	Director: Molly Manning Walker; Cast: Mia McKenna-Bruce, Lara Peake, Shaun Thomas, Samuel Bottomley	Mubi	
M A Y	19	The Zone of Interest	Director: Jonathan Glazer; Cast: Sandra Hüller, Christian Friedel, Medusa Knopf, Daniel Holzberg, Sascha Maaz, Max Beck	A24; Loosely based on the novel of the same name by Martin Amis	
M A Y	21	Firebrand	Director: Karim Aïnouz; Cast: Alicia Vikander, Jude Law, Sam Riley, Eddie Marsan, Simon Russell Beale, Erin Doherty	STX International; Based on Queen's Gambit by Elizabeth Fremantle	
M A Y	22	Club Zero	Director: Jessica Hausner; Cast: Mia Wasikowska, Mathieu Demy, Elsa Zylberstein, Amir El-Masry, Sidse Babett Knudsen, Camilla Rutherford		
M A Y	22	The Settlers	Director: Felipe Gálvez Haberle; Cast: Camilo Arancibia, Mark Stanley, Benjamin Westfall, Alfredo Castro, Marcelo Alonso, Sam Spruell	Mubi	
M A Y	26	The Old Oak	Director: Ken Loach; Cast: Dave Turner, Ebla Mari, Debbie Honeywood, Reuben Bainbridge, Rob Kirtley	StudioCanal	
J U N E	9	The Miracle Club	Director: Thaddeus O'Sullivan; Cast: Laura Linney, Kathy Bates, Maggie Smith, Stephen Rea	Lionsgate	
J U N E	11	The Lesson	Director: Alice Troughton; Cast: Richard E. Grant, Julie Delpy, Daryl McCormack	Focus Features	
J U N E	12	Kensuke's Kingdom	Director: Neil Boyle, Kirk Hendry; Cast: Sally Hawkins, Cillian Murphy, Ken Watanabe, Raffey Cassidy	British Film Institute	
J U N E	16	Greatest Days	Director: Coky Giedroyc; Cast: Aisling Bea, Alice Lowe, Amaka Okafor, Jayde Adams	Based on the musical of the same name Bron Releasing	
J U N E	27	Wham!	Director: Chris Smith; Cast: George Michael, Andrew Ridgeley	Netflix, Altitude	
J U N E	30	My Extinction	Director: Josh Appignanesi; Cast: A. L. Kennedy, George Monbiot, Susie Orbach, Mark Rylance, Simon Schama, Ali Smith, Zadie Smith	Netflix, Dartmouth Films	

=== July–September ===
Opening		Title	Cast and crew	Distributor	Ref.
J U L Y	9	Barbie	Director: Greta Gerwig; Cast: Margot Robbie, Ryan Gosling, Will Ferrell, Simu Liu, America Ferrera, Ariana Greenblatt, Ncuti Gatwa, Emma Mackey, Alexandra Shipp, Michael Cera, Issa Rae	Warner Bros. Pictures	
J U L Y	11	Eigengrau Half-Life	Director: Christopher. C. Arkley; Cast: Dylan Allcock, Ben Whitehead, Katie Buchanan, Christopher. C. Arkley, Adam Reilly, Joe Buchanan, Russel Bury	Out of the Ark Productions	
J U L Y	11	Oppenheimer	Director: Christopher Nolan; Cast: Cillian Murphy, Emily Blunt, Robert Downey Jr., Matt Damon, Rami Malek, Florence Pugh, Benny Safdie, Michael Angarano, Josh Hartnett, Kenneth Branagh	Universal Pictures	
J U L Y	20	Haunting of the Queen Mary	Director: Gary Shore; Cast: Alice Eve, Joel Fry	Imagination Design Works	
A U G U S T	1	Dreams in Nightmares	Director: Shatara Michelle Ford; Cast: Denée Benton, Mars Storm Rucker, Dezi Bing, Sasha Compère, Charlie Barnett		
A U G U S T	18	Chuck Chuck Baby	Director: Janis Pugh; Cast: Annabel Scholey, Louise Brealey, Sorcha Cusack, Celyn Jones, Emily Fairn, Edyta Budnik		
A U G U S T	31	All of Us Strangers	Director: Andrew Haigh; Cast: Andrew Scott, Paul Mescal, Claire Foy, Jamie Bell	Searchlight Pictures	
A U G U S T	31	Saltburn	Director: Emerald Fennell; Cast: Barry Keoghan, Jacob Elordi, Rosamund Pike, Richard E. Grant, Alison Oliver, Archie Madekwe	Warner Bros. Pictures	
S E P T E M B E R	1	Baltimore	Director: Joe Lawlor, Christine Molloy; Cast: Imogen Poots, Jude McClean, Jack Meade, Tom Vaughan-Lawlor, Lewis Brophy, Patrick Martins, Dermot Crowley, John Kavanagh	Bankside Films	
S E P T E M B E R	1	The Pigeon Tunnel	Director: Errol Morris	Apple TV+ Based on the life and career of John le Carré	
S E P T E M B E R	1	Poor Things	Director: Yorgos Lanthimos; Cast: Emma Stone, Willem Dafoe, Ramy Youssef, Mark Ruffalo, Jerrod Carmichael, Margaret Qualley, Christopher Abbott	Searchlight Pictures	
S E P T E M B E R	1	The Royal Hotel	Director: Kitty Green; Cast: Julia Garner, Jessica Henwick, Toby Wallace, Hugo Weaving	Based on Hotel Coolgardie by Pete Gleeson	
S E P T E M B E R	1	Tuesday	Director: Daina O. Pusic; Cast: Julia Louis-Dreyfus, Lola Petticrew, Arinzé Kene, Leah Harvey	A24	
S E P T E M B E R	2	Hoard	Director: Luna Carmoon; Cast: Hayley Squires, Joseph Quinn, Saura Lightfoot Leon, Lily-Beau Leach		
S E P T E M B E R	2	Tatami	Director: Guy Nattiv, Zar Amir Ebrahimi; Cast: Arienne Mandi, Zar Amir Ebrahimi, Jaime Ray Newman, Nadine Marshall, Lirr Katz, Ash Goldeh	WestEnd Films	
S E P T E M B E R	3	Pet Shop Days	Director: Olmo Schnabel; Cast: Darío Yazbek Bernal, Jack Irv, Tal Chatterjee, Willem Dafoe, Peter Sarsgaard, Grace Brennan, Emmanuelle Seigner		
S E P T E M B E R	4	Sky Peals	Director: Moin Hussain		
S E P T E M B E R	7	The Convert	Director: Lee Tamahori; Cast: Guy Pearce, Te Kohe Tuhaka	Cinesky; Based on Wulf by Hamish Clayton	
S E P T E M B E R	7	Copa 71	Director: James Erskine, Rachel Ramsay; Cast: Brandi Chastain, Alex Morgan, Elena Schiavo, Elba Selva, Carol Wilson		
S E P T E M B E R	7	The Critic	Director: Anand Tucker; Cast: Ian McKellen, Gemma Arterton, Mark Strong, Lesley Manville, Romola Garai, Ben Barnes, Alfred Enoch	BKStudios; Based on Curtain Call by Anthony Quinn	
S E P T E M B E R	7	North Star	Director: Kristin Scott Thomas; Cast: Kristin Scott Thomas, Scarlett Johansson, Freida Pinto, Sienna Miller, Emily Beecham, Sindhu Vee		
S E P T E M B E R	8	Unicorns	Director: Sally El Hosaini, James Krishna Floyd; Cast: Ben Hardy, Jason Patel		
S E P T E M B E R	9	Defiant	Director: Karim Amer	Warner Bros. Pictures; Focusing on Dmytro Kuleba and the Russian invasion of Ukraine	
S E P T E M B E R	9	Lee	Director: Ellen Kuras; Cast: Kate Winslet, Marion Cotillard, Alexander Skarsgård, Andrea Riseborough, Josh O'Connor, Andy Samberg, Noémie Merlant	Sky Original; Adapted from The Lives of Lee Miller by Antony Penrose	
S E P T E M B E R	9	One Life	Director: James Hawes; Cast: Anthony Hopkins, Johnny Flynn, Helena Bonham Carter, Lena Olin, Jonathan Pryce, Romola Garai, Alex Sharp	Warner Bros. Pictures; Based on If It's Not Impossible...The Life of Sir Nicholas Winton by Barbara Winton	
S E P T E M B E R	9	The Teacher	Director: Farah Nabulsi; Cast: Saleh Bakri, Imogen Poots, Muhammad Abed Elrahman, Muayyad Abd Elsamad, Stanley Townsend	Front Row Filmed Entertainment	
S E P T E M B E R	9	Wicked Little Letters	Director: Thea Sharrock; Cast: Olivia Colman, Jessie Buckley, Timothy Spall, Anjana Vasan, Joanna Scanlan, Hugh Skinner, Gemma Jones, Lolly Adefope, Malachi Kirby, Alisha Weir, Eileen Atkins	StudioCanal	
S E P T E M B E R	10	Close To You	Director: Dominic Savage; Cast: Elliot Page, Hillary Baack, Wendy Crewson, Peter Outerbridge		
S E P T E M B E R	10	The End We Start From	Director: Mahalia Belo; Cast: Jodie Comer, Katherine Waterston, Benedict Cumberbatch, Mark Strong	Signature Entertainment; Based on The Ed We Start From by Megan Hunter	
S E P T E M B E R	10	Next Goal Wins	Director: Taika Waititi; Cast: Michael Fassbender, Oscar Kightley, David Fane, Beulah Koale, Lehi Falepapalangi, Semu Filipo, Uli Latukefu, Rachel House, Kaimana, Will Arnett, Elisabeth Moss	Searchlight Pictures	
S E P T E M B E R	11	A Haunting in Venice	Director: Kenneth Branagh; Cast: Kenneth Branagh, Kyle Allen, Camille Cottin, Jamie Dornan, Tina Fey, Jude Hill, Ali Khan, Emma Laird, Kelly Reilly, Riccardo Scamarcio, Michelle Yeoh	20th Century Studios; Loosely based on Hallowe'en Party by Agatha Christie and sequel to Death on the Nile	
S E P T E M B E R	11	Pain Hustlers	Director: David Yates; Cast: Emily Blunt, Chris Evans, Catherine O'Hara, Andy García, Jay Duplass	Netflix; Based on Pain Hustlers by Evan Hughes	
S E P T E M B E R	11	Widow Clicquot	Director: Thomas Napper; Cast: Haley Bennett, Tom Sturridge, Sam Riley	Vertical; Based on The Widow Clicquot by Tilar Mazzeo	
S E P T E M B E R	20	The Great Escaper	Director: Oliver Parker; Cast: Michael Caine, Glenda Jackson	Warner Bros. Pictures	
S E P T E M B E R	22	The Canterville Ghost	Director: Kim Burdon, Robert Chandler; Cast: Stephen Fry, Hugh Laurie, Freddie Highmore, Emily Carey, Imelda Staunton, Toby Jones, Miranda Hart, David Harewood, Meera Syal		
S E P T E M B E R	22	Jackdaw	Director: Jamie Childs; Cast: Oliver Jackson-Cohen, Jenna Coleman, Thomas Turgoose, Rory McCann	Vertigo Releasing	
S E P T E M B E R	24	Stopmotion	Director: Robert Morgan; Cast: Stella Gonet, Tom York, Therica Wilson-Read, Caoilinn Springall		
S E P T E M B E R	30	Dance First	Director: James Marsh; Cast: Gabriel Byrne, Fionn O'Shea, Aidan Gillen, Maxine Peake, Sandrine Bonnaire	Sky Cinema; Based on the life of Samuel Beckett	
S E P T E M B E R	30	Foe	Director: Garth Davis; Cast: Saoirse Ronan, Paul Mescal, Aaron Pierre	MGM; Based on Foe by Iain Reid	

=== October–December ===
Opening		Title	Cast and crew	Distributor	Ref.
O C T O B E R	5	Freelance	Director: Pierre Morel; Cast: John Cena, Alison Brie, Juan Pablo Raba, Christian Slater	Signature Entertainment	
O C T O B E R	6	Bonus Track	Director: Julia Jackman; Cast: Joe Anders, Samuel Small, Jack Davenport, Alison Sudol, Susan Wokoma, Ray Panthaki, Josh O'Connor		
O C T O B E R	12	Starve Acre	Director: Daniel Kokotajlo (director); Cast: Morfydd Clark, Matt Smith	BFI Distribution; Based on Starve Acre by Andrew Michael Hurley	
O C T O B E R	14	Chicken Run: Dawn of the Nugget	Director: Sam Fell; Cast: Zachary Levi, Thandiwe Newton, Bella Ramsey, Romesh Ranganathan, David Bradley, Daniel Mays, Jane Horrocks, Imelda Staunton, Lynn Ferguson, Nick Mohammed, Miranda Richardson, Peter Serafinowicz	Netflix; Aardman Animations	
O C T O B E R	15	The Kitchen	Director: Kibwe Tavares, Daniel Kaluuya; Cast: Kane Robinson, Jedaiah Bannerman, Hope Ikpoku Jr, Teija Kabs, Demmy Ladipo, Ian Wright	Netflix	
O C T O B E R	24	Wonka	Director: Paul King; Cast: Timothée Chalamet, Keegan-Michael Key, Sally Hawkins, Jim Carter, Matt Lucas, Natasha Rothwell, Olivia Colman, Rowan Atkinson	Warner Bros. Pictures	
O C T O B E R	26	Cottontail	Director: Patrick Dickinson; Cast: Jessie Buckley, Lily Franky, Ciarán Hinds, Ryo Nishikido, Tae Kimura, Rin Takanashi	WestEnd Films	
O C T O B E R	27	Boudica: The Queen of War	Director: Jesse V. Johnson; Cast: Olga Kurylenko, Clive Standen, Peter Franzén, Rita Tushingham, Nick Moran, Lucy Martin, James Faulkner, Leo Gregory, Harry Kirton	Saban Films; Signature Entertainment; Based on the Brythonic Celtic uprising against the conquering forces of the Roman Empire	
O C T O B E R	27	Freud's Last Session	Director: Matthew Brown; Cast: Anthony Hopkins, Matthew Goode, Liv Lisa Fries, Jodi Balfour, Jeremy Northam, Orla Brady	Vertigo Releasing; Based on Freud's Last Session by Mark St. Germain	
N O V E M B E R	1	Locked In	Director: Nour Wazzi; Cast: Famke Janssen, Rose Williams, Alex Hassell, Finn Cole, Anna Friel	Netflix	
N O V E M B E R	2	The Trouble with Jessica	Director: James Handel; Cast: Shirley Henderson, Alan Tudyk, Rufus Sewell, Olivia Williams, Indira Varma		
N O V E M B E R	3	The Undertaker	Director: Michael Wright; Cast: Paul McGann, Tara Fitzgerald, Roger Barclay, Lily Frazer, Sean Gilder, Murray Melvin, Nicholas Rowe, Bob Cryer	RRB Films	
N O V E M B E R	14	Napoleon	Director: Ridley Scott; Cast: Joaquin Phoenix, Vanessa Kirby, Tahar Rahim	Sony Pictures Releasing	
D E C E M B E R	21	The Iron Claw	Director: Sean Durkin; Cast: Zac Efron, Lily James, Harris Dickinson, Maura Tierney, Holt McCallany, Jeremy Allen White	Lionsgate; Based on the life of Kevin Von Erich and the Von Erich family	
D E C E M B E R	28	Baghead	Director: Alberto Corredor; Cast: Freya Allan, Peter Mullan, Anne Müller, Ruby Barker, Jeremy Irvine		

=== Other premieres ===
Title	Director	Release date	Ref.
Black Dog	George Jaques	14 October 2023 (BFI London Film Festival)	
Breaking Point	Max Giwa, Dania Pasquini	7 July 2023	
Cassius X: Becoming Ali	Muta'Ali Muhammad	20 February 2023	
Celluloid Underground	Ehsan Khoshbakht	5 October 2023 (BFI London Film Festival)	
A Clever Woman	Jon Sanders	21 April 2023	
The Contestant	Clair Titley	8 September 2023 (Toronto International Film Festival)	
The Devil Went Down to Islington	Daniel Wilson	23 October 2023	
Europa	Sudabeh Mortezai	16 August 2023 (Sarajevo Film Festival)	
Forever Young	Henk Pretorius	24 June 2023 (Dances with Film Festival)	
Gassed Up	George Amponsah	10 October 2023 (BFI London Film Festival)	
The Goose's Excuse	Mahdy Abo Bahat, Abdo Zin Eldin	5 October 2023 (BFI London Film Festival)	
Haar	Ben Hecking	7 October 2023 (BFI London Film Festival)	
High & Low — John Galliano	Kevin Macdonald	1 September 2023 (Telluride Film Festival)	
Hitmen	Savvas D. Michael	5 June 2023	
In Camera	Naqqash Khalid	1 July 2023 (Karlovy Vary Film Festival)	
Kindling	Connor O'Hara	25 March 2023	
Lies We Tell	Lisa Mulcahy	15 July 2023 (Galway Film Fleadh)	
Lord of Misrule	William Brent Bell	19 October 2023 (Screamfest Horror Film Festival)	
Lore	James Bushe, Patrick Michael Ryder, Greig Johnson	24 August 2023 (FrightFest London)	
Mad About the Boy: The Noël Coward Story	Barnaby Thompson	2 June 2023	
Makeup	Hugo Andre	26 June 2023	
Man In Black	Wang Bing	22 May 2023 (Cannes Film Festival)	
Mercy Falls	Ryan Hendrick	14 May 2023	
The Moor	Chris Cronin	26 August 2023 (FrightFest London)	
My Everest	Carl Woods	28 April 2023	
The Nettle Dress	Dylan Howitt	3 March 2023	
Notes from a Low Orbit	Mark Lyken	16 June 2023	
Red Herring	Kit Vincent	2 March 2023 (True/False Film Festival)	
Rewilding	Ric Rawlins	13 January 2023	
Scala!!! Or, the Incredibly Strange Rise and Fall of the World's Wildest Cinema and How It Influenced a Mixed-up Generation of Weirdos and Misfits	Ali Catterall, Jane Giles	25 June 2023 (Il Cinema Ritrovato Festival)	
Shoshana	Michael Winterbottom	8 September 2023	
Speed Is Expensive: Philip Vincent and the Million Dollar Motorcycle	Lancaster David	20 September 2023	
Sumotherhood	Adam Deacon	13 October 2023	
The Taste of Mango	Chloe Abrahams	3 March 2023 (True/False Film Festival)	
Tish	Paul Sng	1 June 2023	
Unmoored	Caroline Ingvarsson	5 October 2023 (BFI London Film Festival)	
Vermeer: The Greatest Exhibition	David Bickerstaff	18 April 2023	
Wilding	David Allen	6 October 2023 (BFI London Film Festival)	
Wolf Garden	Wayne David	28 February 2023	

=== Culturally British films ===
The following list comprises films not produced by a British or UK film studio but is strongly associated with British culture. The films in this list should fulfil at least three of the following criteria:

- The film is adapted from a British source material.
- The story is at least partially set in the United Kingdom.
- The film was at least partially produced in the United Kingdom.
- Many of the film's cast and crew members are British.

Title	Country of origin	Adaptation	Story setting	Film locations	British cast and crew
The Buckingham Murders	India		Buckinghamshire, UK	Buckinghamshire, UK	Keith Allen, Chris Wilson
The Little Mermaid	United States		British Caribbeans	London and Iver, UK	Jonah Hauer-King, Noma Dumezweni, Art Malik, Jessica Alexander, Simone Ashley
Peter Pan & Wendy	United States	Peter and Wendy by J. M. Barrie	Victorian England		Jude Law, Alexander Molony
Red, White & Royal Blue	United States		United Kingdom	United Kingdom	Nicholas Galitzine, Stephen Fry, Ellie Bamber, Sharon D Clarke
Surprised by Oxford	United States		United Kingdom	United Kingdom	Phyllis Logan, Simon Callow

Mummies fulfills two of the criteria. The animated film is set in 21st century London and stars British actors including Joe Thomas, Eleanor Tomlinson, Celia Imrie, Hugh Bonneville, Sean Bean and Shakka.

== See also ==
- Lists of British films
- 2023 in film
- 2023 in British music
- 2023 in British radio
- 2023 in British television
- 2023 in the United Kingdom
- List of British films of 2022
- List of British films of 2024
