= Sasha Compère =

American actress

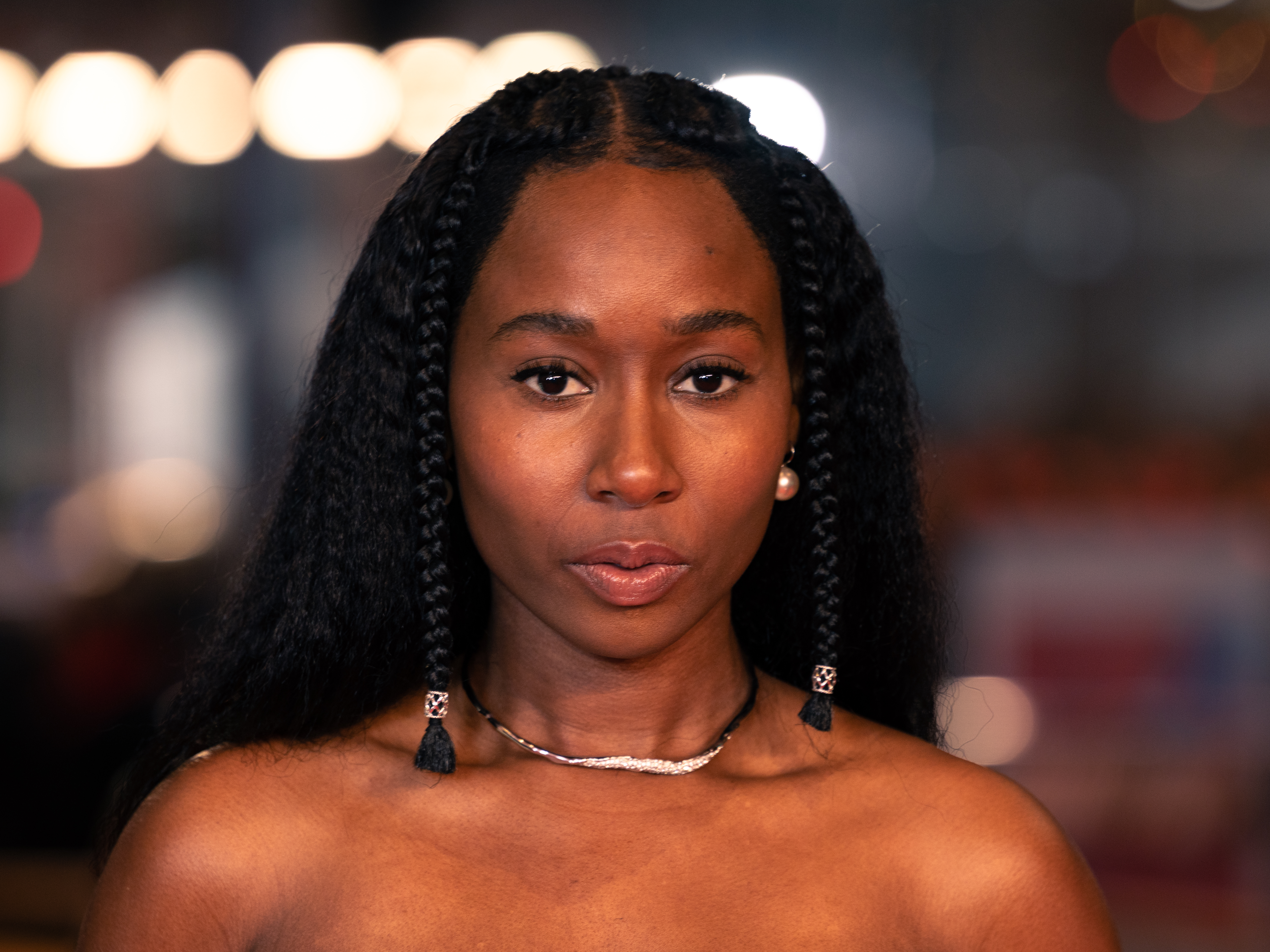
- Sasha Compère at the 2025 Berlin International Film Festival
- Born: Detroit, Michigan, US
- Occupation: Actress
- Years active: 2018–present

Sasha Compère is an American actress known for her roles in the television shows Miracle Workers, Love Life, and Single Drunk Female and in the film Uncorked.

== Early life and education ==
Sasha Compère was born in Detroit, Michigan, the daughter of immigrants from Haiti. She began performing theater in high school and continued theatre and film studies at The University of Michigan, while simultaneously receiving a Bachelors in Business Administration. Sasha joined The Flea Theatre as a member of the Bats in New York in 2009 and performed in their Serials underground theatre before moving to Los Angeles to pursue TV/Film.

== Career ==
Compère's breakthrough role was as a series regular, Laura Greene, on season one of the TBS comedy Miracle Workers. Prior to getting that role, Compère worked in various jobs such as an executive assistant at VH1, a copywriter, waitress, hostess building manager, and as Project Manager of Integrated Marketing at Oprah Winfrey Network. She said the role on Miracle Workers "changed my life."

Compere wrote her way into the union by writing and directing a short film for the internet under the Screen Actors Guild's New Media waiver.

Other prominent credits include a series regular on the anthology HBO show Love Life, starring Anna Kendrick, and a role in the Netflix film Uncorked, starring Mamoudou Athie and written and directed by the show runner for HBO's Insecure, Prentice Penny. Critic Pete Hammond called Compère "perfectly cast" in the film.

Compère appeared as a series regular in the comedy series Single Drunk Female on Freeform.

In February 2024, Sasha recurred as a guest star in National Geographic's seven-time NAACP Image Awards nominated fourth season of Genius (American TV series). Compère played the role of American civil rights activist Juanita Abernathy. Wife of Ralph Abernathy, fellow female organizer of the Montgomery Bus Boycott, best friend of Coretta Scott King and Martin Luther King.

Sasha co-stars in the independent feature film "Dreams in Nightmares written and directed by Shatara Michelle Ford, alongside Denee Benton, Charlie Barnett, Dezi Bing, Jasmin Savoy Brown, and Mars Rucker. The film had its domestic film premiere at Philadelphia's BlackStar Film Festival in August 2024, and competed for the 2025 Teddy Award with its international premiere at Berlin International Film Festival (the Berlinale).

== Selected filmography ==
- Ad Astra as Lieutenant Coleman (2019)
- Uncorked as Tanya (2019)
- Gigi & Nate as Nogo (2022)
- Dreams in Nightmares as Tasha (2024)

== Selected television ==
- Dead Girl's Detective Agency as Ali (2018)
- Reverie as Casey Hathaway (2018)
- Miracle Workers as Laura Greene (2019)
- Love Life as Mallory Moore (2020)
- Single Drunk Female as Brit (2022)
- Genius (American TV series) as Juanita Abernathy (2024)
