= Racism in the wine industry =

Racism in the wine industry is a type of systemic bias and institutionalized racism that has resulted in low participation in the industry by persons of color.

== Background ==
Racism in the wine industry has been a topic of discussion within the industry at least as early as 2018, when Julia Coney wrote an open letter to Karen MacNeil and the wine industry entitled Your Wine Glass Ceiling is My Wine Glass Box in response to an article MacNeil had written for SOMM journal which discussed the lack of women in the wine industry and highlighted dozens of female wine professionals, none of whom were women of color. Sommelier Ashtin Berry said that the industry was both racist and classist.

In June 2020, during the 2020 United States racial injustice reckoning sparked by the George Floyd protests, wine writer Dorothy Gaiter wrote an opinion piece on SevenFifty Daily, a wine industry news site. Economist Karl Storchmann posted data from the American Association of Wine Economists that the US wine industry overwhelmingly supported Donald Trump. Jancis Robinson wrote a piece for the Financial Times, Too White Wine, discussing the industry's racism. Other Black wine professionals called out racism in the industry.

According to Coney, "One of the problems is that most wine is not marketed to people who look like us. We have to change the perception of what a wine drinker looks like.”

== Representation within the industry ==
Winemaker Phil Long, president of the Association of African American Vintners (AAAV), in 2020 estimated that "About 1 percent of 1 percent of all winemakers are Black." He said that in 2020 there were "a few dozen" who were both the winemaker and the brand owner. Bloomberg estimated .1% of US winemakers and brand owners are Black.

A 2019 survey by SevenFifty of 3100 industry professionals found that only 2% identify as Black. The Washington Post pointed out that:

A major entry obstacle for people of color interested in the wine profession is money. It is expensive to learn about wine, from tasting rare, famous bottlings to taking classes for professional certifications. Aspiring winemakers and other wine professionals build their résumés by traveling the world and working harvests in France and elsewhere. Opportunity comes with money.

In South Africa, there are approximately 60 Black-owned wine brands representing 3% of the country's wine industry, although the 2011 census figures showed 90% of the country identifies as Black African or Coloured.

== Microaggressions ==
Black wine professionals have reported experiencing microaggressions from others in the industry and other wine consumers. Coney has said that in restaurants, servers and sommeliers will "steer her to cheaper wines or sweeter choices that fit their stereotype of what she might enjoy." She has related stories of pours at tastings being smaller for her than for white men and of being followed by staff at retail shops. Other Black wine professionals tell of being assumed to be servers at wine tasting events. Some report being grilled about their qualifications at wine events, asked who they knew who had invited them, or treated as if they were "either an imposter or an assistant, never the boss." Until June 2020, the Court of Master Sommeliers required students to address Master Sommeliers as "master"; after sommelier Tahiirah Habibi related her discomfort during her 2011 introductory-level exam when she was the only person of color in the room, writing that her discomfort had been profound enough that she never again pursued any wine credentialling, they revised that requirement. Brenae Royal, vineyard manager at Gallo’s Monte Rosso Vineyard, describes being mistaken for clerical staff in meetings. Heather Johnston, a Brooklyn wine shop owner, describes having wine sales reps address their comments to her white male employee.

== Developments ==
Mac MacDonald founded the AAAV in 2002 with Ernie Bates and Vance Sharp to not only "find the needle in the haystack that is the Black winemaker, but also know it's there in the first place." The organization was founded with the help of Urban Connoisseurs and the United Negro College Fund and supports African Americans pursuing careers in the wine industry.

In 2005 Selena Cuffe co-founded Heritage Link Brands to support Black South African and Brazilian winemakers.

Habibi in 2017 founded the Hue Society to provide a safe space for Black wine connoisseurs to enjoy wine without experiencing racism.

San Francisco sommelier Tonya Pitts reported in June 2020 that Millennial and Gen Z wine drinkers proactively requested wines from women and persons of color and were willing to pay more for those wines.

Long and winemakers Theodora Lee and Danny Glover reported profoundly increased sales during the US racial reckoning. In June 2020 the organization was reporting a surge in both memberships and donations.

Coney created the Black Wine Professionals database in 2020 because she was tired of "being the only Black person invited to a tasting or on a sponsored trip to a wine region" and "seeing the wine industry toss money only to white social-media influencers" and because industry "gatekeepers" had said they didn't contact black wine professionals because they didn't know how.

A group of wine professionals published Actionable Items for the Wine Community, a list of demands, in June 2020.

Robinson and Mags Janjo were as of June 2020 planning a survey of UK wine industry diversity.

Wine Spectator announced that during the month of August 2020 they would highlight Black wine professionals in their Instagram Live series, Straight Talk with Wine Spectator. The series featured McDonald, Coney, Royal, Pitts, Carlton McCoy, Will Blackmon, André Hueston Mack and Terry Arnold.

== Portrayal in popular culture ==
The 2020 film Uncorked, about a Black man studying for certification as a sommelier, "only lightly touched on" racism within the industry.
