= Vernon François =

British hairdresser

Vernon François is a hairdresser from Huddersfield, Yorkshire, England, UK. He is known for his work in the natural hair movement, particularly with curly hair and afro textured hair. He is the founder of the haircare line, the Vernon François Collection, which was created in 2016.

François was raised in Huddersfield, England in a Rastafarian household. He learned to braid, loc and twist hair on a mop from the age of eight and taught himself how to blow dry hair using a fork. By age 14, he was employed in a salon on Oxford Street in London. In 2016, he moved to Los Angeles.

Named a top stylist in 2018 and 2019 by The Hollywood Reporter, François is known for styling the hair of Lupita Nyong’o, Serena Williams, Iman, Solange Knowles, Amandla Stenberg, Denée Benton, Willow Smith, Danai Gurira and Ava DuVernay.

Since starting his career, he has been noted for his "creative, inclusive, and resourceful approach," and has had his work featured in Vogue, InStyle, Stylist, The Hollywood Reporter and Essence. He has also appeared as a guest on The Wendy Williams Show, Good Morning America and BBC Radio 1Xtra.

In 2017, he took part in the inaugural World Afro Day which included setting a world record for the world's largest hair education lesson.
