= Julia Coney =

American wine critic and journalist

- Occupations: Writer; journalist

Julia Coney is an American journalist and wine writer who has advocated for diversity and inclusion in the industry. She wrote an essay about racism in the wine industry and created Black Wine Professionals, a database tool intended to increase diversity in the industry.

== Early life ==
Coney grew up in Texas and Louisiana. In college she majored in English literature.

== Career ==
Coney worked as a legal assistant and beauty blogger until 2016, when she transitioned to writing about wine, which had been a longtime interest. She holds a WSET Level Two Certification in Wine and Spirits.

Coney regularly writes about the intersectionality of wine and racism and has advocated for diversity and inclusion in the wine industry. In 2018 she wrote an open letter to Karen MacNeil and the wine industry entitled Your Wine Glass Ceiling is My Wine Glass Box in response to an article MacNeil had written for SOMM journal which discussed the lack of women in the wine industry and highlighted dozens of female wine professionals, none of whom were women of color. Food & Wine magazine called Coney's open letter "the straw that broke the camel's back". The Washington Post called it memorable.

Coney has said she routinely experiences microaggressions from others in the industry and other wine consumers. She has said that in restaurants, servers and sommeliers will "steer her to cheaper wines or sweeter choices that fit their stereotype of what she might enjoy." She has related stories of pours at tastings being smaller for her than for white men and of being followed by staff at retail shops.

== Black Wine Professionals database ==
In 2020 Coney created Black Wine Professionals, a database of black professionals working in various industry positions that is intended to increase diversity within the wine industry by providing a tool for use by those planning tastings and tours. She said she created the tool because she was tired of "being the only Black person invited to a tasting or on a sponsored trip to a wine region" and "seeing the wine industry toss money only to white social-media influencers" and because industry "gatekeepers" had said they didn't contact black wine professionals because they didn't know how. The database evolved into a membership organization; it has partnered with Laurent-Perrier to offer professional development opportunities to its members.

== Personal life ==
Coney lives in Washington, DC, and in Houston, Texas. She is married.
