= Mars Rucker =

American stage actor (born 1997)

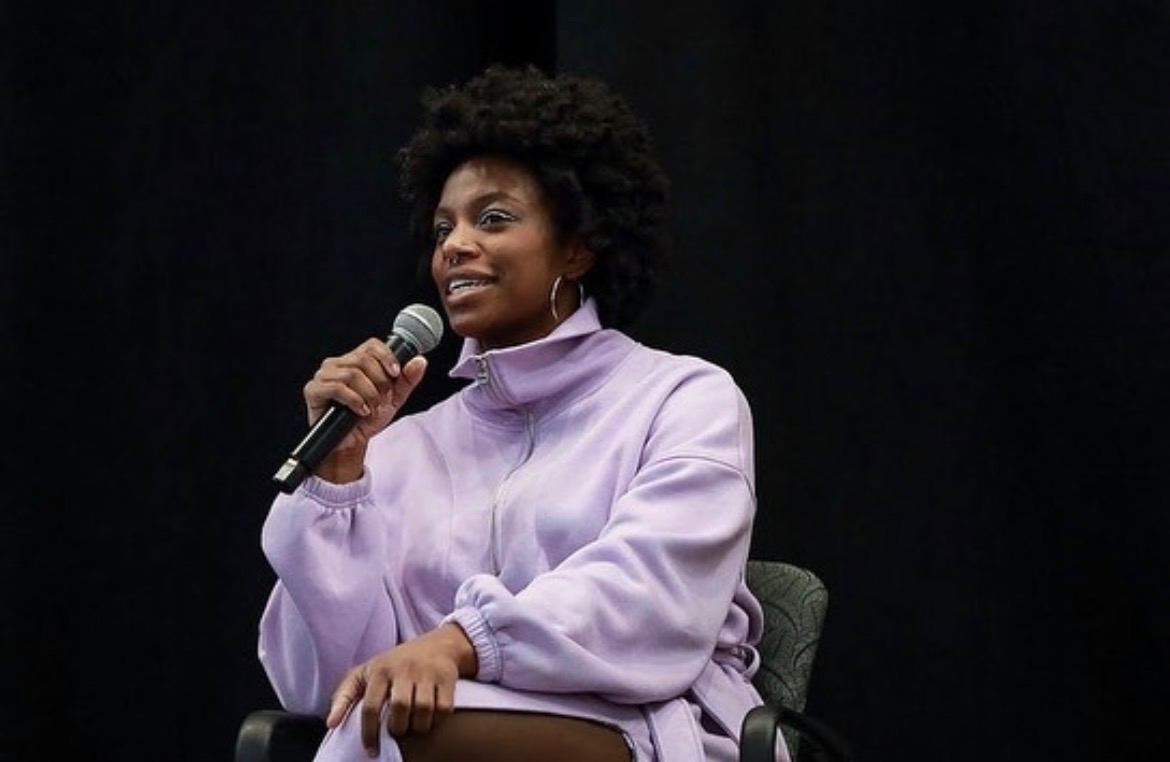
- Born: January 9, 1997 (age 29); Richmond, Virginia
- Education: Manhattan School of Music The New School
- Occupations: Actor, singer, filmmaker, Broadway performer

Mars Storm Rucker (born January 9, 1997) is an American actor, singer, dancer, choreographer, writer, collaborative artist, musician, filmmaker and curator. They are best known for being the first out nonbinary and genderqueer person on Broadway and for playing the role of Kel in Dreams In Nightmares. They made their Broadway debut in 2019 as Alline Bullock, Tina Turner's sister in the musical Tina, nominated for 12 Tony Awards. The role also made them the first out non-binary person to originate a role on Broadway.

== Early life and education ==
Rucker was born in Richmond, Virginia, and raised in Houston, Texas. They started dance classes when they were a young child, but became paralyzed with transverse myelitis at age six. After much rehabilitation and what they say was a "miracle situation", they regained their ability to walk and dance again, although they still lack some feeling in their left leg. The TV show Glee inspired them to become involved in musical theatre, and in their senior year of high school they decided to choose it as their career. In High School, they were nominated for Best Actor in the Tommy Tune Awards.

They attended University of Oklahoma for musical theatre for a year before transferring to Manhattan School of Music for Musical Theatre.

== Career ==
Rucker first became known as the main vocalist of Jahari Stampley's YouTube cover group. The group's covers, such as "Save Me" by BTS and "Gonna Be Alright" by Robert Glasper gained popularity. From there, they were selected as a soloist for Billy Childs, a 17-time Grammy nominee and 6-time Grammy winner, to present his new work at the Manhattan School of Music.

Rucker then made history in their first professional role as Alline Bullock, Tina Turner's sister, in the U.S. original Broadway production of TINA-The Tina Turner Musical in 2019.

In 2021, they were cast as a featured dancer in Bill T Jones choreography and alternate for Lillias White as Madame Sisseretta in musical Black No More, written by John Ridley and music by The Roots MC, Black Thought at the Signature Theatre.

In 2021, Rucker was featured in the short film MAJOR, written and directed by Christopher Betts and executive produced by Tarell Alvin McCraney and Glenn Davis. The film was nominated for Best Dramatic Short in the Los Angeles International Short Film Festival.

On May 4, 2021, Rucker released their sound healing EP called Variations in green.

Rucker gained wider prominence as the alternate for Thoughts 1, 2, and 3, in A Strange Loop. They recorded a song from the show for the album Broadway's Carol for a Cure, and the cast went on to win the Tony Award for Best Musical. Rucker remained with the show until it closed on January 15, 2023.

On March 12, 2022, Mars spoke as a panelist for the Athena Film Festival panel, “Thinking Beyond the Binary: Should Gendered Categories Still Exist?" at Barnard College. "In this discussion, the panelists explored moving beyond the binary, the importance of representing everyone, and the implications of removing gendered categories." Along with Mars, the panelists included Bliss Griffin, Kia Brooks and was moderated by Lisa Kenney.

On December 15, 2022, it was announced that Rucker would play the principal role of Dasia in National Black Theatre and Rattlestick Theatre's first joint co-production in the world premiere of a new play called Amani. Rucker also choreographed for this production (BluePrint Choreography).

Rucker played themself and was a writing collaborator in TikTok mega star, Dylan Mulvaney's Day 365 Live! show at the iconic Rainbow Room in New York. "The show raised awareness and funds for the Trevor Project, which provides crisis support and mental health resources for LGBTQ+ youth." The 80 minute show also included Rachel Brosnahan, Dominique Jackson, Jonathan Van Ness, Reneé Rapp, and L Morgan Lee.

For Pride in June 2023, Rucker was a featured model in Saks Off Fifth's Gender Neutral Capsule Collection Campaign and the Human Rights Campaign's Sexual Health Awareness campaign.

In June 2024, it was announced that Mars would star in Indie-Spirit and Gotham Award nominated Shatara Michelle Ford’s new film “Dreams in Nightmares” debuting at the Black Star Film Festival in August 2024. The film also stars Denee Benton, Sasha Compère and Dezi Bing. It debuted August 1, 2024 at Black Star Film Festival The film also premiered at Berlin International Film Festival and will be the special presentation at British Film Institute. Other festivals include NewFest Film Festival, Frameline Film Festival, Tapei Film Festival and Champs-Élysées Film Festival. The film will be presented with an extended introduction by Rucker on November 6 at the Houston Museum of Fine Arts. The film will open in theaters in August 2026, and will be shown in AMC Theaters nationwide. In October of 2026, the film was nominated for Best Feature at the Gotham Awards.

In August 2024, it was announced that Rucker would play the role of Whatsername in Center Theatre Group and Deaf West collaboration and production of the musical American Idiot. Also leading the cast will include, Milo Manheim, Daniel Durant, and Mason Alexander Park.

In March 2025, Rucker's music curation and song arrangements for the ERYC Taylor Dance's 2025 ETD New Choreographer Grant concert were presented in collaboration with recipient Nhyira Asante at the Martha Graham Studio Theater.

In June 2025, Rucker was an actor and the Head of DEI in the Sound and Scene cohort film "Them That's Not" debuting at and sponsored by The NewFest Film Festival directed by Mekhai Lee.

In June 2025, Rucker's debut film "Echoes: The B Side" was announced as a special presentation at IFC Center in collaboration with QueerIArt as a screening program spotlighting short films by an international roster of Black trans filmmakers and was curated by Lee Laa Ray Guillory. Their film was also presented at The New School Film Festival, in addition to them being on the programming team of the festival where the film won an award from Ifeyinwa Arinze. The film was announced by Deadline as an official selection in the 37th edition of NewFest and was selected for Queer Voices: New York City Film Festival. The film was recently announced by Deadline as the runner up for the audience award for Best Documentary/Non-Fiction Short. The film was presented at The City College of New York as a celebration of trans voices where Rucker was given the citation for special achievement from the NYC Public Advocate.

Rucker is pursuing a master's degree in liberal studies, with a focus on multimedia and immersive performance.

== Personal life ==
Rucker identifies as a "proud Black, queer, nonbinary person, adding that their queerness aligns with their Blackness". Their gender identity aligns with "African and Indigenous" understandings of gender. Mars uses they/them pronouns.

== Theatre credits ==
Year(s)	Production	Role	Location
2019–2020	Tina-The Tina Turner Musical	Alline Bullock/Ikette	Broadway
2019–2020	Tina-The Tina Turner Musical	Alline Bullock/Ikette	Lunt-Fontanne Theatre
February 6-March 12, 2022	Black No More	Madamme Sisseretta (alt)	Off-Broadway
	Black No More	Signature Theatre	
2022-2023	A Strange Loop	Thoughts 1, 2, and 3 (alt)	Broadway
2023	Amani	Dasia	Off Broadway
2024	American Idiot	Whatsername	Center Group Theatre LA-Mark Taper Forum

=== Film ===
Year	Title	Role	Notes
2021	Major	Rochelle	Short film
2024	Dreams in Nightmares	Kel	Feature-opens in AMC Theatres August 21, 2026
2025	Them That's Not	DEI Head	Short Film
2025	Echoes: The B Side	Director	Short Film
