= Uncorked (2020 film) =

2020 film directed by Prentice Penny

- Theatrical release poster
- Directed by: Prentice Penny
- Written by: Prentice Penny
- Produced by: Prentice Penny; Jill Ahrens; Ryan Ahrens; Ben Renzo; Datari Turner; Chris Pollack; Jason Michael Berman
- Starring: Mamoudou Athie; Courtney B. Vance; Niecy Nash; Matt McGorry; Sasha Compère; Gil Ozeri; Kelly Jenrette; Bernard David Jones; Meera Rohit Kumbhani
- Cinematography: Elliot Davis
- Edited by: Sandra Montiel
- Music by: Hit-Boy
- Production companies: Mandalay Pictures; Miles Media; Datari Turner Productions; Argent Pictures; A Penny For Your Thoughts Entertainment; Forge Media
- Distributed by: Netflix
- Release date: March 27, 2020 (United States)
- Running time: 104 minutes
- Country: United States
- Language: English

Uncorked is a 2020 American drama film, written and directed by Prentice Penny. It stars Mamoudou Athie, Courtney B. Vance, Niecy Nash, Matt McGorry, Sasha Compère, Gil Ozeri, Kelly Jenrette, Bernard David Jones, Melisia Lomax and Meera Rohit Kumbhani.

It was released on March 27, 2020, by Netflix.

== Plot ==
Elijah works both at a wine business and at his family's local barbecue restaurant in Memphis, TN, where his father Louis and mother Sylvia also work. His grandfather struggled and worked very hard to build the successful business and Louis expects Elijah to take it over someday. Eli is not interested and wants to do his own thing, so he's leaning torward wine.

At a large family dinner, Eli's dad openly criticises him for forgetting something for the restaurant, so Elijah admits he was at an open mixer for a sommelier school. Louis makes it seem like he is flighty, changing his mind as to what he wants constantly. That night, Sylvia calls Louis out for not supporting their son. He is frustrated at Elijah's lack of interest in the restaurant

Elijah meets Tanya at the wine shop and they go on a date at a roller rink. He tells her about how he became interested in wine, and expresses his aspiration to become a master sommelier. Seeing his passion for it, Tanya encourages him to pursue his dream. Elijah takes the grueling entrance exam for the Master Sommelier program and earns admittance.

Looking for his father, Elijah finds him at a location for a second restaurant he plans on opening. Louis details his plans for the place, and finally he directly tells him he doesn't want it. Eli announces that he's going back to school for the training, and investing all of his savings into it. However, he also promises to continue working.

To improve their chances, Eli joins a study group. When they are told the class is invited to an exchange program in Paris, he realizes he won't be able to afford it. Classmate Harvard offers to split it with him, so Elijah raises the rest of the money he needs through fundraising in his extended family and selling his car.

Elijah has a major financial setback when Harvard's father calls him back home. He is expected to return to work with him at Citibank. While in Paris Elijah learns Sylvia's cancer, which had been in remission for two years, has metastasized. However, she insists he stay in France and wires him money despite Louis's disapproval.

Sylvia dies, and Elijah returns home for the funeral. He tries to concentrate, but is constantly distracted, thinking about his mom. Eli begins missing classes for his sommelier program in order to help Louis at the family restaurant. Eventually, Elijah is forced to withdraw from the program.

Louis gives in and, with Tanya and others, helps Elijah study for the master sommelier exam. He takes his exam and later finds out that he did not pass, so returns to his two jobs. Sometime thereafter, out to dinner one night with Tanya, he comes across one of his friends who'd struggled in the study group but still became a master sommelier. Inspired, Elijah reenrolls in the program.

== Cast ==
- Mamoudou Athie as Elijah
- Courtney B. Vance as Louis
- Niecy Nash as Sylvia
- Matt McGorry as Harvard
- Sasha Compère as Tanya
- Gil Ozeri as Richie
- Kelly Jenrette as Brenda
- Bernard David Jones as JT
- Melisia Lomax as Boo
- Meera Rohit Kumbhani as Leann
- Matthew Glave as Raylan
- Princeton James as Newton

== Production ==
In November 2018, it was announced Niecy Nash, Courtney B. Vance and Mamoudou Athie had joined the cast of the film, with Prentice Penny directing from a screenplay he wrote. Penny, Datari Turner, Chris Pollock, Jason Michael Berman, Jill Ahrens, Ryan Ahrens, Ben Renzo will serve as producers, while Patrick Raymond, Veronica Nickel, Drew Brees and Tony Parker will serve as executive producers, under their Forge Media, Mandalay Pictures, and Argent Pictures banners, respectively. In December 2018, Kelly Jenrette, Matt McGorry, Gil Ozeri, and Bernard David Jones joined the cast of the film.

=== Filming ===
Principal photography began on November 10, 2018, in Memphis, Tennessee. Production concluded on December 11, 2018.

== Release ==
It was scheduled to have its world premiere at South by Southwest on March 14, 2020. However, the film was pulled from the festival due to the COVID-19 pandemic. It was released on March 27, 2020, by Netflix.

== Critical reception ==
Uncorked received positive reviews from film critics. It holds a 91% approval rating on review aggregator website Rotten Tomatoes, based on 46 reviews, with an average of 6.5/10. The website's critical consensus reads, "Like a good wine, once you let Uncorked breathe, its heartfelt tenderness will yield a sweet time." On Metacritic, the film holds a rating of 62 out of 100, based on 14 critics, indicating "generally favorable reviews".

John DeFore of The Hollywood Reporter gave the film a positive review writing: "Vance and Athie create characters worth our attention, and the script's realistic handling of their conflict pulls Uncorked through its lulls." Michael Rechtshaffen of The Los Angeles Times also gave the film a positive review writing: "Penny has crafted a thoroughly workable and well-informed vehicle, providing a nurturing atmosphere for the unhurried dramatic developments and uniformly gracious performances." Anna Menta of Decider gave the film a positive review writing: "Vance and Nash are a freakin' delight in this movie and any moment that either of them is on the screen is a moment very much enjoyed indeed."

Benjamin Lee of The Guardian gave the film two out of five stars writing: "There's not enough special sauce here to make it linger, it's a palate cleanser at best."

Reviewers who approached the film from a wine background gave it a generally average score making such comments as, "every now and then, it really hit the spot" and "the film overall falls rather flat and while possibly of interest to wine people, it's not going to be 'the next Sideways". Black sommelier Michaelangelo Wescott criticized it for only touching lightly on the racism within the industry.
