= Love Life (American TV series) =

American romantic comedy anthology television series (2020–2021)

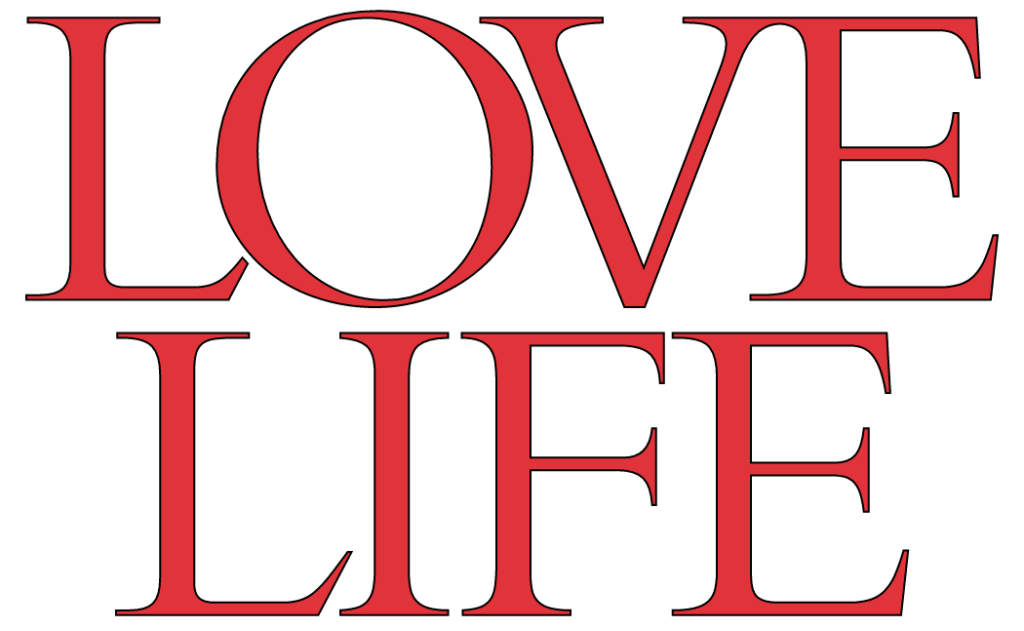
- Genre: Anthology; Romantic comedy
- Created by: Sam Boyd
- Starring: Anna Kendrick; Zoë Chao; Peter Vack; Sasha Compère; William Jackson Harper; Jessica Williams; Comedian CP; Punkie Johnson
- Narrated by: Lesley Manville; Keith David
- Music by: Dan Romer; Mike Tuccillo
- Country of origin: United States
- Original language: English
- No. of seasons: 2
- No. of episodes: 20

Production
- Executive producers: Bridget Bedard; Sam Boyd; Paul Feig; Dan Magnante; Anna Kendrick; Rachelle Williams-BenAry; William Jackson Harper
- Producers: Denise Pinckley; Leah Nanako Winkler; Solomon Georgio; Ali Kinney
- Cinematography: Adrian Peng Correia
- Editors: Brent White; Ken Eluto; Jennifer Lilly; Peter CabadaHagan; Shannon Mitchell; Janet Weinberg; Erin Nicole Wyatt
- Running time: 28–37 minutes
- Production companies: Foxera; Feigco Entertainment; Let's Go Again, Inc.; Mandatory Snack; Lionsgate Television; HBO Max Originals

Original release
- Network: HBO Max
- Release: May 27, 2020 – November 11, 2021

Love Life is an American romantic comedy anthology television series created by Sam Boyd and starring Anna Kendrick that premiered on the HBO Max streaming service on May 27, 2020. The series follows a different person each season from their first romance until their last romance and "how the people we're with along the way make us into who we are when we finally end up with someone forever."

In December 2022, Love Life was canceled after two seasons and removed from HBO Max.

== Cast ==
=== Main ===
- Anna Kendrick as Darby Carter (season 1; special guest star season 2)
- Zoë Chao as Sara Yang (season 1; guest star season 2), Darby's roommate and best friend
- Sasha Compère as Mallory Moore (season 1; guest star season 2), Darby's other roommate and friend
- Peter Vack as Jim (season 1; guest star season 2), Sara's boyfriend and later ex-boyfriend
- William Jackson Harper as Marcus Watkins (season 2)
- Jessica Williams as Mia Hines (season 2)
- Comedian CP as Yogi (season 2)
- Punkie Johnson as Ida Watkins (season 2)

The series is narrated by Lesley Manville (season 1) and Keith David (season 2).

=== Recurring ===
- Jin Ha as Augie Jeong
- Hope Davis as Claudia Hoffman, Darby's mother
- Janet Hubert as Donna Watkins, Marcus' mother (season 2)
- Jordan Rock as Trae Lang (season 2)
- Leslie Bibb as Becca Evans (season 2)
- John Earl Jelks as Kirby Watkins (season 2)
- Arian Moayed as Kian Parsa (season 2)
- Steven Boyer as Josh (season 2)

=== Guest ===
- Scoot McNairy as Bradley Field
- Maureen Sebastian as Kate Field
- Nadia Quinn as Lola
- Gus Halper as Danny Two-Phones
- Nick Thune as Magnus Lund
- James LeGros as Larry Carter
- Jackson Demott Hill as Hunter Carter
- Siobhan Fallon Hogan as Darby's therapist
- Courtney Grosbeck as teenager Darby Carter
- John Gallagher Jr. as Luke Ducharme
  - Griffin Gluck portrays teenager Luke Ducharme
- Kingsley Ben-Adir as Grant
- Maya Kazan as Emily Hexton (season 2)
- Kimberly Elise as Suzanné Hayward (season 2)
- Ego Nwodim as Ola Adebayo (season 2)
- Blair Underwood as Leon Hines (season 2)

== Episodes ==
=== Series overview ===
Season	Episodes	Originally released	
Season	Episodes	First released	Last released
1	10	May 27, 2020	June 11, 2020
2	10	October 28, 2021	November 11, 2021

=== Season 1 (2020) ===
No. overall	No. in season	Title	Directed by	Written by	Original release date
1	1	"Augie Jeong"	Sam Boyd	Sam Boyd	May 27, 2020
While at a karaoke night in 2012, Darby meets Augie Jeong, who immediately begins flirting with her. The two spend the night together and she gives him her number before he leaves the next morning. After several agonizing days of not hearing from him, Darby talks to her roommates, Sara and Mallory, and Jim, Sara's long-term boyfriend, about whether to text him first. Augie finally texts her and the two start a relationship. After several months, Augie announces he'll be leaving town to report on the Obama re-election campaign. On his last night in town, they attend Darby's boss's wedding, where the two say "I Love You" for the first time. They discuss staying in touch via Skype, but it seems unlikely their relationship will continue. He leaves the next morning. The final seconds of the episode flash forward to Darby walking down the street, pregnant, with a bare ring finger.
2	2	"Bradley Field"	Craig Johnson	Bridget Bedard	May 27, 2020
One year later, Darby starts a relationship with her former boss, Bradley, who's recently divorced. He's older and successful, feeding her insecurity. She attempts to rekindle her interest in photography by taking a class, but receives only criticism and drops out. The difference in age and maturity between Darby and Bradley comes to a head when she gets drunk at his father's wake and embarrasses them both. Following their breakup, she purchases a photo from a former classmate and begins building an art collection.
3	3	"Danny Two Phones"	Tricia Brock	Ali Liebegott	May 27, 2020
Another year passes, and Darby runs into Augie getting coffee. Augie has quit his job and is preparing to travel the country in a van with his girlfriend. Darby's roommate Sara drags her to a party to make her stop thinking about Augie, but Sara feels guilty she skipped her boyfriend Jim's family event to go to the party. After kissing another guy in a game of spin the bottle, Sara leaves and goes to see Jim and his family. While there, one of Jim's relatives tells her to let Jim go if he's not the one. Meanwhile, Darby ends up sleeping with Danny, a guy from the party, but she's turned off by his intensity and lies that she's moving to Cleveland for a job opportunity. Later, she runs into him while working at the Whitney. Danny is hurt by her lie, and while she's initially defensive, Darby apologizes. Darby runs into Augie at the coffee house again, who's arguing with his girlfriend about their road trip, and after a brief exchange Darby leaves for a job interview at an auction house. As Augie's girlfriend loads the van, Augie scrolls through Darby's social media.
4	4	"Magnus Lund"	Craig Johnson	Brig Muñoz-Liebowitz	June 4, 2020
After a series of casual relationships, Darby begins dating Magnus Lund, a chef. He seems perfect: fun, successful, affectionate, and great with Darby's mom. After a vacation to the country, he moves in with Darby. Things take a turn when, on the same day Darby gets a promotion at the auction house, Magnus is fired, sending him into a depression. He watches sports and drinks a lot, and Darby begins to resent that she's supporting them both. After a fight, Magnus seems motivated to look for a job, but he leaves the house one morning and doesn't return for 24 hours. Darby, scared and worried, goes through his stuff and finds a birthday card from another woman, past-due bills, and credit card debt. She discusses Magnus with Sara and Mallory, who describe Magnus as shady and a flirt. When he finally comes home, he reveals he's gotten her name tattooed on his chest and he asks her to marry him. Meanwhile, Sara begins to worry she's outgrown Jim.
5	5	"Luke Ducharme"	Stephanie Laing	Sam Boyd	June 4, 2020
Darby tries therapy to discuss her relationship with Magnus and realizes her fear of rejection has made her a people-pleaser. After the therapist asks her to recount the first time she felt rejection, Darby describes her first relationship as a teenager, during one year she spent at boarding school. While stuck there over Thanksgiving break, feeling unwanted by both her parents, she has an intense fling with fellow student Luke Ducharme. However, after break ends, Luke ignores her and hooks up with her roommate. When Darby's roommate finds her crying, Darby lies and says she has cancer. The news spreads throughout the school, Luke takes her back, and Darby is showered with affection and support. When she's caught in her lie, she's humiliated and leaves school to return home. In the present day, Darby downplays the incident, saying she was a stupid teenager and it was no big deal. Darby's therapist disagrees and asks her to come back. Darby decides not to continue therapy and remains in her relationship with Magnus.
6	6	"Magnus Lund Part II"	Jennifer Kaytin Robinson	Jaclyn Moore and Brig Muñoz-Liebowitz	June 4, 2020
A year after getting engaged and eight months after getting married, an unemployed Magnus frustrates Darby by pursuing a wrongful termination lawsuit against his previous employer, without much luck. Darby connects with Luke on Facebook and they meet up when he is in New York. He apologizes for the way he treated her in high school. They spend more time together and eventually kiss, but Darby stops it and tells him that she's just frustrated at her husband. Luke, now a lawyer, offers to help with Magnus's lawsuit, but Magnus becomes rude and aggressive when Luke tells him the case doesn't have much merit. An angry Darby goes to Luke's hotel room for a drink, where Luke tells her she can leave Magnus if she wants. Darby and Luke sleep together, but part ways after, leaving Darby feeling guilty and confused. After a major success at work, Darby tells Magnus she wants a divorce. Magnus threatens self-harm and belittles Darby and they fight, but Darby stands her ground. Meanwhile, Sara and Jim realize they want different things when he announces he's moving to New Jersey and she refuses to go with him.
7	7	"Claudia Hoffman"	Anu Valia	Megan Mercier	June 11, 2020
Seven months after getting divorced from Magnus, Darby has quit her job at the auction house and is working with Bradley's friend Lola at a gallery. Darby needs to have her appendix out and her mother Claudia comes to take care of her after the surgery. Darby quickly becomes annoyed with her overbearing, critical mother and it escalates into a fight. Darby tries to smooth things over but then her younger brother Hunter calls and Claudia's focus is shifted to her son. While out shopping with her family, Darby starts crying when she sees how easily Claudia bonds with Hunter. Claudia and Darby have a serious but heartfelt conversation in the store, helping them see the other person's point of view about their relationship and they resolve to be more understanding. Meanwhile, Jim still refuses to take Sara's calls, so Sara crashes a friends birthday party to "accidentally" run into Jim. Jim tells her they're on different paths and he doesn't want to get back together or even be friends after her behavior.
8	8	"Sara Yang"	Stephanie Laing	Ali Liebegott	June 11, 2020
Mallory, Darby and Sara's friend and former roommate, is getting married, so the girls head to a cabin for the bachelorette weekend. Shortly after arriving, Darby catches Sara and fellow guest Ramona doing lines of coke in a bedroom. At dinner, Sara gives an overly emotional toast. Later, when everyone is asleep, Sara sneaks out and goes for a drive while drunk and high. Darby finds her sleeping in the car in the morning and tells her off. Sara spends the day cleaning and sobering up and promises to be better. In the evening, the girls head to a strip club. Sara gets drunk and sneaks off to the bathroom to do more coke and finds a bag with a large amount of money in one of the stalls. She returns the bag, but later the owner accuses Sara of stealing the money. Darby and Sara leave the club, and Sara admits she stole the money. She feels betrayed by Jim, she has lost her job, and she feels like Darby doesn't need her anymore. Darby encourages Sara to get professional help and go to rehab. The next morning, Sara acts like she doesn't remember their talk. Darby gives Sara an ultimatum: go to rehab or the friendship is over. Sara hides under the covers and Darby leaves the cabin.
9	9	"Augie Again"	Stephanie Laing	Franklin Hardy	June 11, 2020
It's Thanksgiving, two months after the bachelorette party. Darby attends a Friendsgiving party hosted by Jim, who tells her he heard Sara is in rehab. At the party, she runs into Augie. After the dinner, Augie and Darby have sex and decide to get back together. At first the relationship seems perfect, but after Darby takes Augie to a work party at the gallery, he makes some comments that embarrass Darby in front of Lola. She begins to question whether they really are a good fit and whether being 'comfortable' with each other is enough. Darby asks Jim for advice, and he tells her that if they're not bringing out the best in each other, it's okay to end things. While talking with Jim, Darby reacts badly to the smell of their food. Jim suspects she may be pregnant, which she confirms by taking a number of pregnancy tests. She visits with Augie and tells him they're too different now and that things aren't really working out. Augie says he's glad she broached the subject and he's happy she's breaking up with him. The episode ends with Darby about to reveal her pregnancy.
10	10	"The Person"	Sam Boyd	Bridget Bedard & Sam Boyd	June 11, 2020
Two years after the pregnancy test, Darby is mother to baby Theo, who she co-parents with Augie. Darby spends her first night apart from Theo to go to Sara's wedding (who is now sober) and Darby's mom Claudia comes to babysit. Darby expresses frustration to Claudia about the different expectations that she and Augie face as parents. Claudia reassures Darby that while she will probably never live up to the high expectations that are placed on her, Theo will appreciate her in the long-run, and cites their now close relationship. At the reception, Darby and Sara have a heartfelt conversation and repair their friendship. Darby is seated by a man named Grant and, encouraged by Sara, Darby spends the entire evening hanging out and talking with him. Darby invites him to her hotel room, where they kiss. Grant goes out to get some drinks from the corner store, but Darby falls asleep while he's gone and he can't get back into her room. Grant leaves his number and a kind note, but it's implied she doesn't call him. She runs into Grant a few weeks later and they hit it off again and go for a long walk with Theo. A little while later, Darby and Grant (who the narrator announces is the person Darby will spend the rest of her life with) are still dating, and Darby celebrates a successful gallery opening, finally content with her life.

=== Season 2 (2021) ===
No. overall	No. in season	Title	Directed by	Written by	Original release date
11	1	"Mia Hines"	Sam Boyd	Rachelle Williams-BenAry & Sam Boyd	October 28, 2021
Marcus Watkins is a book editor married to Emily, a restaurant worker. At Darby's wedding to Magnus, Marcus meets Mia Hines. They quickly bond and Marcus sends a book to Mia he thinks she will like. Marcus begins communicating with Mia regularly and spending more and more time with her despite both of them being in relationships. Marcus' friends Yogi and Kian caution him to not spend so much time with Mia, and instead focus on improving his marriage. Marcus attends a gallery event with Mia while Emily is at work, and afterwards goes back to Mia's apartment. They flirt, but Marcus goes home without anything happening. The next day, Mia says she's too sick to hang out. Marcus rushes over with a care package, but leaves when Mia's boyfriend, Amar'e Stoudemire, answers the door. Convinced to recommit to his marriage, Marcus returns home to find Emily has discovered his text messages with Mia via the cloud, which mock Emily and say marrying her was a mistake.
12	2	"Paloma"	Pete Chatmon	Leah Nanako Winkler	October 28, 2021
Having divorced Emily, Marcus crashes with his sister Ida. One Friday night, Marcus rallies his team at work for an in-office happy hour where he is talked into taking Adderall. Later on, he meets up with Ida at a bar; while there, Mia asks to hang out and meets them there. Mia and Marcus later go for a walk, which turns into an argument where Marcus accuses her of leading him on and ending his marriage. Mia denies this, claims they are just friends, and storms off. Marcus goes to another bar and meets a girl named Paloma; they leave to hook up, but Marcus learns she is just a college senior when they arrive at her dorm. Aware of and clearly uncomfortable with how much older he is than her, Marcus nonetheless has sex with her. On the walk home, Marcus stops outside his old apartment and sits, thinking about how his marriage with Emily is done.
13	3	"Destiny Mathis"	Thembi Banks	Amain Berhane	October 28, 2021
Marcus goes with Ida and her girlfriend Keiko to visit his parents, Donna and Kirby, for their wedding anniversary. On the way there, he receives an Instagram comment from Destiny Mathis, a former high school classmate. Marcus meets up with her, and they have sex in Ida's car. The next day, Donna invites Destiny (who Marcus had mentioned to her the night before) to the anniversary party. She shows up, but Marcus largely ignores her. When Destiny attempts to leave, Marcus offers her a ride home. They arrive at her house, where Marcus (in Ida's car) is suddenly boxed in by Destiny's ex-boyfriend, who smashes the car's windshield and taillight. Unable to make it home in time, Marcus misses his parents' speeches at the party. When he arrives home, he and Donna talk about Emily and about his relationships, and she shows him a video of Kirby's speech encouraging him to keep going. Meanwhile, Ida and Keiko get in a fight over Keiko giving out her soap samples to Ida's family in an attempt to grow her business, and they break up.
14	4	"Ola Adebayo"	Pete Chatmon	Neel Shah	November 4, 2021
Nine months after the visit to his parents, Marcus meets Ola Adebayo, a playwright, at a bookstore, and they start up a relationship. Despite Marcus not feeling more than a spark for her and clearly unsure of their compatibility, the two continue dating for several weeks and eventually move in together. One night, when moving Ola's car, Marcus runs into Mia and the two briefly catch up. That night, Marcus, feeling further doubts about his relationship with Ola, cannot get aroused when they try to have sex. Trying to get his mojo back, Marcus is finally able to masturbate in the shower when he imagines Mia there with him naked, but Ola walks in and catches him. He admits to her that he moved too fast with her, and she angrily tells him off and dumps him.
15	5	"Becca Evans"	Stacey Muhammad	Ali Kinney	November 4, 2021
Six months after Ola dumps him, Marcus and Mia are friends and Marcus is in a casual sex relationship with Becca Evans. At work, Marcus' boss Josh offers him a promotion but makes no commitment to a raise in pay. He also gives Marcus two tickets to an event featuring a poetry reading by Nikki Giovanni; when Marcus mentions this on the phone to his parents, Donna insists he bring Kirby as his plus-one. That same night, Becca invites Marcus over for a threesome with her friend Gigi, but Marcus climaxes quickly. Marcus goes with Kirby to the poetry event, where they bond and also get to meet and speak with Giovanni. After Marcus arrives home, Becca shows up at his apartment and tells him that she got pregnant the night of the threesome and she plans on keeping the baby. She tells Marcus he can be as involved or not involved as he wants. Marcus criticizes her for not thinking of the negative stereotypes of Black men being uninvolved parents, and the two argue about their roles as parents before Becca storms out.
16	6	"Becca Evans Part II"	Natalia Leite	Megan Mercier	November 4, 2021
Marcus, depressed and uninvolved with Becca as she continues with her pregnancy, has a change of heart after Yogi encourages him to be an involved father and reaches back out to Becca. Marcus goes to one of Becca's doctor's appointments with her, then afterwards meets up with Mia in Central Park. Marcus and Mia talk for hours and go for a long walk around the city that lasts into the night and ends in a kiss. The next day, Becca calls Marcus over and tells him that the doctor informed her that due to genetic abnormalities she will likely have a miscarriage. Marcus consoles her, but Becca ultimately decides that she wants to handle it on her own. Marcus tells Mia, who comes over to his apartment. The two talk on his couch and appear ready to start a relationship.
17	7	"Suzanné Hayward & Leon Hines"	Stacey Muhammad	Rachelle Williams-BenAry & Helin Jung	November 11, 2021
In a flashback, Suzanné looks after her daughter, a young Mia, while at work at a bank. Her divorced father, Leon, refuses to give additional support. Present-day, six months after Mia and Marcus start dating, Suzanné calls Mia to tell her she's losing her house. Mia goes to her mother's house to help her move out, where she learns that Suzanné and Leon have been seeing each other again. Untrusting of her father, Mia has dinner with him. He apologizes for not showing up over the years, but she remains unconvinced. The next day, Leon flakes on showing up to help move a piano. Upset, Mia calls Akil, a TaskRabbit worker, to move the piano, and she hooks up with him. Mia returns to Brooklyn guilty over her infidelity. Marcus, completely unaware of what she has done, throws her a surprise birthday party. After the party, while Mia and Marcus are alone, Marcus reaches into his coat pocket to give her a key to his apartment; Mia, thinking it is an engagement ring, blurts out "don't propose". They argue, and Mia dumps a stunned Marcus.
18	8	"Yogi & Kian"	Natalie Leite	Leah Nanatko Winkler & Amain Berhane	November 11, 2021
Devastated over being dumped by Mia, Marcus lashes out in front of everyone at Suttoncourt and subsequently takes a two-week leave from work. Yogi and Kian suggest a trip and they decide to go camping. That night, around the campfire, Kian admits to Marcus that he is dating Emily and suggests that they are eventually going to get married. Marcus initially appears accepting of this. However, the next morning, he eats the group's mushroom chocolates and gets in a fight with Kian, who says he is undoing the damage Marcus did to Emily. Marcus leaves to go on a bike ride into the forest, then throws his bike into the lake. Yogi and Kian, noticing that Marcus ate the mushroom chocolates, go searching for him. Lost in the forest and having a bad trip, Marcus calls Mia and leaves her a panicked voicemail. That night, after their car breaks down, Yogi and Kian find and wake up Marcus in the forest, where he and Kian both apologize. Kian calls for Emily to pick them up, and she and Marcus have their first conversation since the divorce, in which he apologizes for how he treated her.
19	9	"Marcus Watkins"	Satya Bhabha	Theo Travers	November 11, 2021
Shortly after the COVID-19 pandemic begins, Marcus breaks up with his new girlfriend, Anjali. Marcus visits Ida, who tells him that she and Jaleesa are getting married. Marcus agrees to be her best man. Marcus struggles while alone, with the challenges of the pandemic, and even more so when racial unrest breaks out across the country. Mia calls him and admits to sleeping with Akil, apologizes, and asks to see Marcus, but he declines. Meanwhile, most of Marcus's coworkers at Suttoncourt are furloughed, drastically increasing his workload. Later, when Josh asks Marcus (the only remaining Black member of the team) to read over a PR statement on the unrest, Marcus criticizes him for marginalizing Black voices while saddling him with all the work and quits on the spot. At Ida's wedding, she and Marcus share a heartfelt conversation, which inspires him to call Mia and meet up. The two share lunch and clear the air about their relationship and various issues. They almost part ways, but reconcile and get back together.
20	10	"Epilogue"	Sam Boyd	Bridget Bedard & Aundrea Posey	November 11, 2021
10 months after Marcus and Mia move in together, they are invited to and attend a show created by Ola, "Little Ass Boy", that is clearly inspired by her relationship with Marcus, though Ola denies that to him after the show. Mia suggests that Marcus write a book of his own. Marcus then proposes to Mia, and she accepts. The following year, Mia gives birth to a daughter, Audre. They hire a nanny to look after Audre so Marcus can finish his book on schedule. Marcus brings his book to Trae Lang, who is lukewarm on it and suggests it needs edits. With some motivation following a chance encounter with Darby and Theo and a conversation with Mia, Marcus finishes the book and gets it published. 15 months later, Marcus is a successful author, but realizes that his new fame is taking a toll on Mia. He encourages her to quit her unsatisfying job, then surprises her with a trip to the Bahamas. While on the flight, Marcus happily tells Mia the story of running into Amar'e Stoudemire at her door.

== Production ==
=== Development ===
On May 23, 2019, it was announced that WarnerMedia had ordered a romantic comedy anthology straight to series with the first season consisting of ten episodes for HBO Max. The series was created by Sam Boyd who was also expected to executive produce alongside Anna Kendrick, Paul Feig, Jessie Henderson, and Bridget Bedard. The pilot was also written and directed by Sam Boyd. Production companies involved with the series were slated to consist of Lionsgate Television and Feigco Entertainment. On June 11, 2020, HBO Max renewed the series for a second season. Janet Hubert, Jordan Rock, and Maya Kazan joined the second season as executive producers.

=== Casting ===
Alongside the initial series announcement, Anna Kendrick was also cast in a lead role. On August 13, 2019, it was reported that Zoë Chao, Sasha Compère and Peter Vack joined the cast in starring roles, with Scoot McNairy joining in a recurring role. On November 5, 2020, William Jackson Harper was cast to headline the second season with Kendrick set to reprise her role of Darby as a guest. On May 3, 2021, it was announced that Jessica Williams and Chris Powell joined the main cast. On July 20, 2021, Punkie Johnson was cast in a starring role while Leslie Bibb, John Earl Jelks, and Arian Moayed were cast in recurring roles for the second season. Kimberly Elise, Ego Nwodim, and Blair Underwood also joined the cast as guest stars for the second season. The following month, Keith David was cast in the role of the season's narrator while Steven Boyer joined the cast in a recurring role.

=== Filming ===
Filming had begun by August 2019 in Queens, New York. The final scene of the finale was filmed on March 12, 2020, and production was forced to shut down the next day because of the COVID-19 pandemic. While several more days of filming pick-ups had been planned, they were able to complete the season without those additional shots.

== Release ==
The series premiered on May 27, 2020, on HBO Max. In Australia, the series was released on May 27, 2020, on Stan, and public broadcaster BBC acquired television broadcast rights in the United Kingdom (where the series started airing on the broadcaster's main BBC One channel) to the series on September 10, 2020. The series is streaming on Lionsgate Play in India. In the United States, the series was aired on TBS on August 22, 2021. The second season was scheduled to debut on October 28, 2021, with the first three episodes available immediately, followed by three episodes on November 4, and the final four episodes on November 11.

In December 2022, Love Life was canceled after two seasons and removed from HBO Max. In July 2025, it was announced that the series was acquired by Netflix and was released on Netflix on August 5, 2025. It is set to leave Netflix on February 4, 2026.

== Reception ==
On Rotten Tomatoes, the first season has an approval rating of 63% based on reviews from 51 critics, with an average rating of 5.4/10. The site's critics consensus reads: "Love Life first season breezes by on Anna Kendrick's charms, but those looking for a real connection may find its featherweight familiarness frustrating." On Metacritic it has a weighted average score of 54 out of 100 based on reviews from 22 critics, indicating "mixed or average reviews". On Rotten Tomatoes, the second season holds an approval rating of 95% based on reviews from 21 critics, with an average rating of 7.1/10. The site's critics consensus states: "William Jackson Harper's Love Life is easy to get caught up in thanks to the star's charm and this season's thoughtful exploration of a real romantic conundrum." On Metacritic, the second season has a weighted average score of 78 out of 100 based on reviews from 10 critics, indicating "generally favorable reviews".
