= Miracle Workers (2019 TV series) =

American anthology comedy television series

- Title card for the first season
- Genre: Comedy; Anthology
- Created by: Simon Rich
- Based on: What in God's Name by Simon Rich (season 1); "Revolution" by Simon Rich (season 2)
- Starring: Daniel Radcliffe; Geraldine Viswanathan; Karan Soni; Jon Bass; Sasha Compère; Lolly Adefope; Steve Buscemi; Quinta Brunson
- Opening theme: "Cowboy Soprano" by Oh Morice (season 1); "Been Here Before" by Tony Molina (season 2)
- Country of origin: United States
- Original language: English
- No. of seasons: 4
- No. of episodes: 37

Production
- Executive producers: Lorne Michaels; Simon Rich; Andrew Singer; Daniel Radcliffe; Steve Buscemi; Jorma Taccone
- Producers: Dan Mirk; Paul Garnes
- Cinematography: Brian Burgoyne
- Editors: Jessica Burnetto; Rob Burnett
- Running time: 22–23 minutes
- Production companies: Broadway Video; Allagash Industries (seasons 1–2); FXP; Studio T (season 1); RIP Productions (season 3-4); Pink Moment Productions (season 3-4)

Original release
- Network: TBS
- Release: February 12, 2019 – August 28, 2023

Miracle Workers is an American anthology comedy television series created by Simon Rich for TBS. It is based in part on Rich's writings, with the first season being based on his 2012 novel What in God's Name, while the short story "Revolution" provided the basis for the second season. The series stars an ensemble cast comprising Daniel Radcliffe, Steve Buscemi, Geraldine Viswanathan, Jon Bass, Karan Soni, Sasha Compère, and Lolly Adefope. The show was a co-production between TBS and FX, whose in-house production company FXP was involved.

Miracle Workers premiered on February 12, 2019, with its seven-episode first season. A second season, subtitled Dark Ages, premiered in January 2020, and a third season, subtitled Oregon Trail, premiered in July 2021. In November 2021, the series was renewed for a fourth season, subtitled End Times, which premiered on July 10, 2023. In November 2023, the series was cancelled after four seasons.

== Premise ==
In the first season, Craig is a low-level angel responsible for handling all of humanity's prayers, and Eliza is a recent transfer from the Department of Dirt. Their boss, God, has checked out to focus on his favorite hobbies. To prevent Earth's destruction, Craig and Eliza must achieve their most impossible miracle to date. The season is based on Rich's novel What in God's Name.

The second season is set during the Dark Ages and is based on Rich's short story "Revolution".

In the third season, Reverend Ezekiel Brown leads his dying, famine-stricken town for a better life on the Oregon Trail, taking in notorious outlaw Benny the Teen as trail master.

In the fourth season, taking place in a postnuclear apocalyptic world, Road Warrior Sid and Warlord Freya Exaltada, along with their War Dog Scraps, leave behind the ravaging Wasteland for a more normal life in Boomtown.

== Cast and characters ==
=== Main ===
| Cast member | Character and role | | | |
| Cast member | 1 | 2 | 3 | 4 |
|---|---|---|---|---|
| Daniel Radcliffe | Craig Bog | Prince Chauncley the Pretty Cool | Reverend Ezekiel "Zeke" Brown | Sid |
| Steve Buscemi | God | Edward "Eddie" Murphy Shitshoveler | Benny the Teen | Morris 'The Junkman' Rubinstein |
| Geraldine Viswanathan | Eliza Hunter | Alexandra "Al" Shitshoveler | Prudence Aberdeen | Freya Exaltada |
| Karan Soni | Sanjay Prince | Lord Chris Vexler | The Gunslinger | TI-90 / "Tai" |
| Jon Bass | Sam Gardner | Michael "Mikey" Shitshoveler | Todd Aberdeen | Scraps the War Dog / Roland Proudfoot |
| Sasha Compère | Laura Greene | | | Julia (Guest) |
| Lolly Adefope | Rosie | Maggie | | NeuralNet (Guest) |
| Quinta Brunson | | | Trig | Administrator |

=== Guest ===
| Cast member | Character and role | | | |
| Cast member | 1 | 2 | 3 | 4 |
|---|---|---|---|---|
| Tim Meadows | Dave Shelby | | Jedidiah Noonan | |
| Jessica Lowe | | Mary Baker | Branchwater tavern host | |
| Erin Darke | | | Phaedra | Holly |
| Paul F. Tompkins | | | Snake Oil Salesman | Percy |

==== Season 1 ====
- John Reynolds as Mason
- Angela Kinsey as Gail, an angel in the Department of Angel Resources
- Tim Meadows as Dave Shelby
- Chris Parnell as God's Dad
- Margaret Cho as God's Mom
- Tituss Burgess as God's Brother

==== Season 2 ====
- Peter Serafinowicz as King Cragnoor the Heartless
- Tony Cavalero as Ted Carpenter
- Jessica Lowe as Mary Baker
- Jamie Demetriou as Town crier
- Kevin Dunn as Bert Shitshoveler
- Fred Armisen as Percival Forthwind
- Kerri Kenney-Silver as Lila
- Greta Lee as Princess Vicki

==== Season 3 ====
- Shay Mitchell as Purple
- Jordan Firstman as Kaya
- Carl Tart as Lionel
- Tim Meadows as Jedidiah Noonan
- Erin Darke as Phaedra
- Jessica Lowe as Branchwater tavern host
- Ron Funches as Dirty Dick Bob
- Karamo Brown as American Patriot
- Bobby Moynihan as Governor Lane
- Paul F. Tompkins as Snake Oil Salesman

==== Season 4 ====
- Ithamar Enriquez as Devon
- Erin Darke as Holly
- David Dastmalchian as Ugulus Sleeze
- Annie Mumolo as Linda Sherman
- Lisa Loeb as singer
- Jon Daly as Dr. Crazybrainz
- Garcelle Beauvais as Freya's mother
- Tim Heidecker as Freya's father
- Paul F. Tompkins as Percy
- Ego Nwodim as Belinda
- Kyle Mooney as John Christ
- Sasha Compère as Julia
- Lolly Adefope as NeuralNet

== Episodes ==
| Season | Title | Episodes | Originally released | |
| Season | Title | Episodes | First released | Last released |
|---|---|---|---|---|
| 1 | Miracle Workers | 7 | February 12, 2019 | March 26, 2019 |
| 2 | Dark Ages | 10 | January 28, 2020 | March 31, 2020 |
| 3 | Oregon Trail | 10 | July 13, 2021 | September 14, 2021 |
| 4 | End Times | 10 | July 10, 2023 | August 28, 2023 |

=== Season 1 (2019) ===
| No. overall | No. in season | Title | Directed by | Written by | Original release date | U.S. viewers (millions) |
|---|---|---|---|---|---|---|
| 1 | 1 | "2 Weeks" | Jorma Taccone | Simon Rich | February 12, 2019 (Note: The episode was released via TBS' official YouTube channel on February 8, 2019.) | 1.20 |
God decides to blow up Earth and focus his efforts on a new restaurant. Eliza, recently moved to the Prayer-answering department, makes a bet with God that if she and Craig can answer one "impossible" prayer within two weeks God will spare Earth. The "impossible" prayer they decide upon is to bring Sam and Laura, two socially awkward people with crushes on each other, together to kiss as a couple.
| 2 | 2 | "13 Days" | Jorma Taccone | Cirocco Dunlap | February 19, 2019 | 1.03 |
Although Eliza and Craig manage to pull off the difficult task of getting Sam and Laura to find each other and exchange phone numbers, their mission is threatened when Laura meets a charming man named Mason. Meanwhile, God assigns Sanjay with the tedious task of exploding Bill Maher's penis, which is hampered by repeated complications.
| 3 | 3 | "12 Days" | Ryan Case | Jeff Loveness | February 26, 2019 | 0.94 |
While trying to finish their plan, Eliza and Craig encounter a troublesome human. After learning his mistake, Sanjay attempts to burnish his credentials record.
| 4 | 4 | "6 Days" | Ryan Case | Heather Anne Campbell | March 5, 2019 | 0.95 |
Sanjay joins Craig and Eliza's team, somewhat supplanting Craig. With much effort, they arrange a date between Sam and Laura. The team discovers that Sam's beloved grandmother is scheduled to die immediately before the date.
| 5 | 5 | "3 Days" | Maurice Marable | Mitra Jouhari & Gary Richardson | March 12, 2019 | 0.94 |
Rosie is offered a great job on another world, but can only take it after the Earth is destroyed. Nonetheless, she helps trick God into signing an extension of life waiver for Sam's grandmother.
| 6 | 6 | "1 Day" | Dan Schimpf | Lucas Gardner | March 19, 2019 | 0.93 |
Over Craig's objections, Eliza, Sanjay, and Rosie attempt to get Sam and Laura to kiss on the kiss cam at a basketball game, but the results are so catastrophic that the couple depart the game separately, angry with each other. God pitches his restaurant idea to his family, who decline to invest, due to the failure of Earth. God decides not to destroy his creation, but since there is no going back on the deal, God joins the others in their efforts to get Sam and Laura to kiss.
| 7 | 7 | "1 Hour" | Maurice Marable | Dan Mirk | March 26, 2019 | 0.90 |
Sam and Laura walk separately through the city streets, the angels have only a half hour left before the end of the world to manipulate them back to each other. They enlist the help of Heaven Inc.'s union workers, who celebrate the impending end of the world, but offer their technical expertise. God offers his help too, but Sanjay, fearing that he will only ruin things, attempts to keep him occupied with a meaningless task. The angels are rendered powerless to affect the couple when the electricity goes out at their command central. Eliza manages to restore it, but instead of using their tools at their disposal, she instead points to the couple, who despite their shyness, end up sharing a kiss on their own, saving the Earth.

=== Season 2: Dark Ages (2020) ===
| No. overall | No. in season | Title | Directed by | Written by | Original release date | U.S. viewers (millions) |
|---|---|---|---|---|---|---|
| 8 | 1 | "Graduation" | Jarrad Paul & Andrew Mogel | Simon Rich | January 28, 2020 (Note: The season premiere aired on January 19 as a "sneak peek" ahead of the premiere in its regular timeslot.) | 1.10 |
Alexandra Shitshoveler graduates from school and is ready to make her life successful, but reluctantly follows her father's footsteps to shovel the town's feces as her lifelong occupation. Meanwhile, Prince Chauncley attempts to please his father by fighting battles for the kingdom, but decides at the last minute to instead lead the kingdom by being nicer to the peasants instead of through war.
| 9 | 2 | "Help Wanted" | Jarrad Paul & Andrew Mogel | Lucas Gardner | February 4, 2020 | 1.10 |
When Mikey finds Chauncley's pet duck, Chauncley scams him out of it, causing him to feel guilt for the first time. Alexandra is offered a job at the medical center, gaining the respect of her peers, but is forced to become a whistleblower when she realizes the doctor is a complete fraud.
| 10 | 3 | "Road Trip" | Daniel Gray Longino | Anna Drezen | February 11, 2020 | 0.81 |
The invention of the indoor pit toilet threatens Edward's business, forcing him to adapt. Vexler accidentally screws up an important diplomatic mission, believing he is saving Chauncley's life, and Chauncley takes the blame. Dedicated to Brandt Michael Screamface who died on October 30, 2020 at the age of 58 after being diagnosed with renal cell carcinoma.
| 11 | 4 | "Internship" | Daniel Gray Longino | Georgie Aldaco | February 18, 2020 | 0.84 |
Chauncley realizes he has no connection with common workers and asks Vexler to find him a job. He ends up interned to Edward and nearly destroys his business, leading Edward to decide to be honest with Chauncley about his incompetence. Mikey falls in with a 'merry band,' who turn out to be a gang that robs his house; Al helps him trap the bandits and regain his stolen book.
| 12 | 5 | "Holiday" | Dan Schimpf | Lucas Gardner | February 25, 2020 | 0.95 |
The kingdom celebrates Harvest Day. Alexandra gets into a fight with her uncle Bert over politics, accidentally revealing to the family that his wife left him after being sexually unfulfilled; she apologizes and they reconcile. Chauncley attempts to organize a family game night with his visiting extended family, culminating in a bloodbath when Kragnor kills the other family members. Chauncley goes for a walk and encounters Al, who invites Chauncley to their family game night.
| 13 | 6 | "Music Festival" | Dan Schimpf | Jen Jackson | March 3, 2020 | 0.85 |
Alexandra becomes jealous of Maggie's commitment to work at the convent and her new nun friend Trish. Chauncley organizes a music festival to impress Alexandra, but the star, Percival Forthwind, is rude and temperamental and insists on playing his new experimental material. After Percival walks off and is rude to Mikey, Chauncley erupts and threatens Percival, who performs his hit "Hoo Hoo Hoo". Trish leaves to perform with Percival and Maggie gets promoted.
| 14 | 7 | "Day in Court" | Dan Schimpf | Zeke Nicholson | March 10, 2020 | 0.73 |
After a royal goat eats their garden, Alexandra and her father sue the crown for damages. Vexler files a counter-lawsuit, but Chauncley defuses the situation.
| 15 | 8 | "First Date" | Steve Buscemi | Jen Jackson | March 17, 2020 | 0.86 |
Alexandra is swept off her feet by a handsome astronomer, angering Chauncley, who also has feelings for her. Edward befriends a Druid woman, forcing his friends to confront their prejudices.
| 16 | 9 | "Moving Out Part 1" | Tamra Davis | Dan Mirk | March 24, 2020 | 0.94 |
Alexandra plans to move to Paris with her astronomer boyfriend, breaking Edward's heart. Chauncley is forced into a political marriage. Chauncley defies his father, causing war to break out, as Alexandra returns home to make sure her family is safe.
| 17 | 10 | "Moving Out Part 2" | Tamra Davis | Dan Mirk | March 31, 2020 | 0.84 |
With invaders overrunning the village, King Cragnoor flees. Alexandra, Chauncley, and Vexler all have a chance to escape, but elect to stay and save their friends. They drive off the enemy by tricking them into believing the town is stricken with plague. Alexandra and Chauncley head for Paris, leaving Vexler with the throne.

=== Season 3: Oregon Trail (2021) ===
| No. overall | No. in season | Title | Directed by | Written by | Original release date | U.S. viewers (millions) |
|---|---|---|---|---|---|---|
| 18 | 1 | "Hittin' The Trail" | Andrew DeYoung | Dan Mirk & Robert Padnick | July 13, 2021 | 0.79 |
Reverend Zeke prays for someone to lead his dying town to Oregon. Outlaw Benny the Teen shows up and takes the job to escape from the law. Zeke betrays Benny to a bounty hunter known as The Gunslinger, but later rescues him with his friend Prudence.
| 19 | 2 | "Fording the River" | Steve Buscemi | Jared Miller | July 20, 2021 | 0.72 |
When the wagon train reaches a river, they find they are too overweight to float across and must abandon someone. Zeke volunteers to stay behind and build his own raft. Todd insists he and Prudence take the ferry, where they meet a pair of laid-back adventurers. Prudence decides she wants an adventure as well and returns to the ford in time to save Zeke from drowning.
| 20 | 3 | "Hunting Party" | Andrew DeYoung | Zeke Nicholson | July 27, 2021 | 0.59 |
With the party out of food, Todd leads a buffalo hunting expedition. Zeke, in an attempt to look manly, comes along. Todd admits how much he loves Prudence but can not express himself; Zeke writes a love letter for her husband Todd to read to her. Prudence, bored with the sewing circle, asks Benny to teach her banditry. They survive a shootout with the Gunslinger, but after learning how Benny had been betrayed by his adopted daughter, Trig, Prudence decides she's not outlaw material.
| 21 | 4 | "What Happens in Branchwater" | Andrew DeYoung | Taylor Cox | August 3, 2021 | 0.63 |
After many days on the road, the party decides to take a small detour to relax at a town called Branchwater. In Benny's words, this town is known to be the manifestation of the idea of the wild West, with many bar fights, thriving prostitution and more, but when the party arrives they discover the town has changed enormously to accommodate the growing tourism. Zeke, prompted by Prudence's advice to relax, drinks a salesman's supposed miracle drink called Snake Oil, and becomes drunk, resulting in daring words and an unforgettable stage dance. Todd loses his fortune in a series of card games while Benny and the Gunslinger trade memories of the old Branchwater. The next morning, Zeke finds himself ashamed of his behaviour and tries to blame it on the drink, only to discover it had no effect whatsoever and all he did was on him alone. He confesses his feelings for Prudence, but she tells him she needs some time to process and think.
| 22 | 5 | "Meet the Noonans" | Dan Schimpf | Andrew Farmer | August 10, 2021 | 0.86 |
The party is raided by a gang led by Benny's estranged daughter, Trig. Benny attempts to reconnect with her, but they end up fighting over how to execute the Gunslinger, causing Trig to angrily leave. A group of religious zealots called the Noonans, led by Jedidiah, offers to help the party get back on their feet. Zeke becomes engaged to Phaedra, a member of the party. Prudence, who finds Phaedra to be dull, breaks them up by announcing Zeke's (extremely minor) sins to the congregation, but later helps reunite them and they marry.
| 23 | 6 | "Independence Rock" | Dan Schimpf | Carrie Kemper | August 17, 2021 | 0.59 |
The wagon train reaches Independence Rock on the fourth of July and everyone celebrates Independence Day. Benny, embarrassed that Trig has supplanted him as the area's worst outlaw, attempts to execute an Uncle Sam impersonator, but stops when he realizes he's upsetting the children. Humiliated, he abandons the wagon train. Phaedra strongly disapproves of Zeke's intense patriotism. As Phaedra prays and Todd is passed out drunk, Zeke and Prudence kiss.
| 24 | 7 | "White Savior" | Blake McClure | Kelly Lynne D'Angelo | August 24, 2021 | 0.83 |
Benny is captured by a group of Blackfeet who are unimpressed with his reputation. When a general from the Bureau of Indian Affairs comes to kick the Natives off their land, Benny insists on negotiating on their behalf, leading to a cavalry attack. The Natives repel the soldiers, causing Benny to realize he is not the white savior and he returns to the wagon train.
| 25 | 8 | "Over the Mountain" | Steve Buscemi | Henry Michaels | August 31, 2021 | 0.69 |
Zeke and Prudence carry on an affair under their oblivious spouses' noses. Trig attacks Benny, furious that her exploits are still being compared to her father's, but is subdued by Zeke and Prudence. When a series of disasters befall the wagon train, Zeke thinks God is punishing him and he confesses the affair, causing him to become an outcast. Trig convinces Todd to release her. Todd sends the wagons hurtling down the mountain before escaping with Trig and a captive Prudence.
| 26 | 9 | "Stranded" | Claire Scanlon | Matthew Bass & Theodore Bressman | September 7, 2021 | 0.57 |
Stranded in a blizzard, the pioneers, including Zeke, resort to cannibalism. When they prepare to butcher young Levi, Benny offers himself instead, causing everyone to give up on their plans and wait out the storm. The outlaws reach Oregon and are impressed at the riches and lack of law. Trig gets Todd elected governor and uses him to turn the state into a criminal paradise, with Prudence locked in a cage in the governor's mansion.
| 27 | 10 | "End of the Trail" | Claire Scanlon | Robert Padnick & Dan Mirk | September 14, 2021 | 0.59 |
The wagon party arrives in Oregon City to find it has been transformed into a criminal hellscape by Trig and her gang. Zeke attempts to rescue Prudence from Todd's Caligula-like orgy, while Benny and the wagon party challenge Trig and her gang to a shootout. Hopelessly outgunned, Benny surrenders, but tells his daughter how proud he is of her, melting her heart. Prudence kills Todd with a cannon. Benny joins Trig's gang as her second in command. Pheadra leads some of the travelers to a new life in Florida, while Zeke, Prudence, and the others begin to rebuild the town.

=== Season 4: End Times (2023) ===
| No. overall | No. in season | Title | Directed by | Written by | Original release date | U.S. viewers (millions) |
|---|---|---|---|---|---|---|
| 28 | 1 | "Welcome to Boomtown" | David Wain | Dan Mirk & Robert Padnick | July 10, 2023 | 0.48 |
In a nuclear, post-apocalyptic wasteland, Freya, a warlord, and Sid, a road warrior, meet in combat. They immediately fall in love, get married, and move to a settlement called Boomtown with their human dog, Scraps. Sid gets a job with the local junk dealer, Morris Rubinstein, who invites Sid and his wife over to dinner. Freya is warned by her cyborg friend Tai that Boomtown will make them boring. When Tai, summoned by Freya, shoots up the dinner party, Rubinstein fires Sid. Sid and Freya agree to try to build a life together in Boomtown. Rubinstein, after being beaten by Freya, rehires Sid.
| 29 | 2 | "H.O.A." | David Wain | Rob Klein | July 10, 2023 | 0.30 |
When the Boomtown Home Owners Association forces Freya to remove her display of severed heads, she attempts to take over the HOA. She loses the election, but claims to Scraps that it's all part of a larger plan. Sid kills a mutant named Ugulus Sleeze to prevent Mr. Rubinstein from selling him a powerful artifact, which turns out to be a karaoke machine.
| 30 | 3 | "The MatriXXX" | Heather Jack | Ashley Wigfield | July 17, 2023 | N/A |
Freya and Sid's sex life has become stale, so Tai brings them into a virtual world called the MatriXXX to explore their sexual fantasies. Sid admits to being aroused by boulders, disgusting his wife. They finally have nice virtual date, rekindling their passions. Mr. Rubinstein attends his high school reunion, where he confronts his old bully and connects with his old crush, even though his entire class died in the Boom and are nothing but skeletons.
| 31 | 4 | "The Grouping Ceremony" | Bill Benz | Dan Klein | July 17, 2023 | N/A |
Freya's constant partying with Tai catches up with her when Dr. Crazybrainz diagnoses her with a hangover. She attempts to continue her lifestyle until she wakes up at her own funeral and admits she's slowing down. Mr. Rubinstein's two-headed son Timmy is about to be sorted into a 'group.' He bribes the administrator into putting Timmy into 'Strong,' but later allows him to go to 'Heroic,' where he actually belongs.
| 32 | 5 | "Jim Carrey in the Park" | Bill Benz | Nora Winslow | July 24, 2023 | 0.37 |
Freya is forced to skip friends weekend with Tai and Sid to take Scraps to an audition for Mr. Rubinstein's production of Ace Ventura: Pet Detective. Freya lands the lead role, but has a breakdown, believing she is actually the title character. Meanwhile, Sid is forced to spend the weekend with Tail and his four identical clones, who resent him for coming. When Tai overdoses on data, Sid saves his life by submerging him in rice, cementing their friendship.
| 33 | 6 | "Olympus" | Heather Jack | Henry Michaels | July 31, 2023 | 0.40 |
Fredya's unbelievably wealthy parents invite her and Sid to a weekend at their floating utopian city, Olympus. They consider staying, until Freya's father steals Sid's organs. Scraps attempts to fit in with the pure-bred eunuchs in Olympus. Mr. Rubenstein hires Tai to fix the ball pit in his McMansion. When his holographic wife discovers he's still carrying on with his skeleton girlfriend, she leaves him, causing him to look to Tai for solace.
| 34 | 7 | "Roland Proudheart" | Steve Buscemi | Tommy Do | August 7, 2023 | 0.44 |
Scraps is kidnapped by his old village, where he was a respected man named Roland Proudhart, a husband and father who saved the town from Freya's wrath. After realizing the stress of being a man, he returns to being Freya's war dog. Sid buys a Bifi, a huge man who serves as a vehicle, but becomes obnoxiously obsessed with his 'car'.
| 35 | 8 | "Children of Women" | Blake McClure | Matt Walsh | August 14, 2023 | 0.46 |
Freya is pregnant and feels uneasy about bringing a child into the world. Mr. Rubinstein's baby-worshiping cult causes her to have to flee the city to get her head together. Tai takes Scraps back to the year 2023 to assassinate a man who will destroy robotkind, but they become distracted and go to an escape room instead. Tai's target uses the time machine to travel to the future and begin a human/robot war.
| 36 | 9 | "John Christ" | Claire Scanlon | Dan Mirk | August 21, 2023 | 0.45 |
NeuralNet, the AI that originally destroyed the world, accuses Tai of being obsolete as a killbot and forces him to compete against newer models. John Christ, the time traveler from 2023, recruits Sid in his protests against NeuralNet, but he balks at bombing Mr. Rubinstein's business. Scraps arranges a gang war for Freya's last hurrah before giving birth, but her heart is no longer in warlording.
| 37 | 10 | "The End" | Claire Scanlon | Robert Padnick | August 28, 2023 | 0.37 |
NeuralNet leads Tai and an army of robot clones to attack Boomtown to destroy John Christ. John Christ is killed, but Freya, Sid, and the original Tai use his device to shut down NeuralNet. A year later, Freya, now the president of the HOA, leads Boomtown in a celebration of their victory.

== Production ==
=== Development ===
On May 17, 2017, TBS announced that it had given the production a series order for a first season consisting of seven episodes. The series was created by Simon Rich and based on his novel What in God's Name. Executive producers were expected to include Rich, Lorne Michaels, Andrew Singer, Daniel Radcliffe, and Owen Wilson. Production companies involved with the series were slated to consist of Broadway Video and Studio T. On October 19, 2017, it was announced that Wilson would no longer be serving as an executive producer and would be replaced with Steve Buscemi.

On May 15, 2019, the series was renewed for a second season. On November 20, 2019, it was announced that the second season, titled Miracle Workers: Dark Ages, would premiere on January 28, 2020. On August 6, 2020, the series was renewed for a third season that will focus on the Wild West and Oregon Trail. On May 19, 2021, it was announced that the third season, titled Miracle Workers: Oregon Trail, would premiere on July 13, 2021.

On November 3, 2021, TBS renewed the series for a fourth season. On October 27, 2022, it was announced that the fourth season, titled End Times, would premiere on January 16, 2023. On January 16, 2023, TBS quietly postponed the season premiere to a date yet to be announced later in the year. That same day, the first episode of End Times was released on HBO Max in some countries. However, the episode did not air on TBS in the U.S. that week as previously scheduled and was removed from HBO Max two days later, with the remainder of the season delayed indefinitely. According to a spokesperson for TBS, Miracle Workers was "one of the impacted series" in a January scheduling adjustment. The network said the scheduling shift would allow TBS to "better support the series later in the year." On May 31, 2023, it was announced that the fourth season would premiere on July 10, 2023. On November 21, 2023, it was announced that the series was canceled after four seasons.

=== Casting ===
Alongside the initial series order announcement, it was confirmed that Daniel Radcliffe and Owen Wilson would star in the series. On October 19, 2017, it was announced Steve Buscemi had replaced Wilson in the role of God after the latter had decided to vacate the part. In November 2017, Deadline Hollywood and Variety reported that Geraldine Viswanathan, Jon Bass, Karan Soni, and Sasha Compère had been cast in series regular roles. On March 25, 2018, it was announced that Lolly Adefope had joined the cast in a main role. On May 27, 2021, Quinta Brunson joined in a recurring role for the third season.

=== Filming ===
Principal photography for the first season took place in December 2017 and January 2018 in and around Atlanta, Georgia. Filming took place in Norcross, Georgia, on December 29, 2017, and in Piedmont Park on January 16, 2018.

== Release ==
Season 1 promotional poster

On December 4, 2018, TBS announced that the series would premiere on February 12, 2019. On January 26, 2019, the series held a screening of the pilot episode during the 2019 Sundance Film Festival. Those in attendance included Daniel Radcliffe, Geraldine Viswanathan, Karan Soni, and Simon Rich. On February 8, 2019, TBS released the first episode of the series on its official YouTube channel. In Australia, the series has same day release on the streaming service Stan as a Stan Exclusive.

== Reception ==
=== Critical response ===
On Rotten Tomatoes, the first season has an approval rating of 74% based on reviews from 39 critics, with an average rating of 6.26/10. The website's critical consensus reads, "More charming than clever, Miracle Workers functions as a palatable showcase of Daniel Radcliffe and Steve Buscemi's quirky star power." On Metacritic it has a score of 61 out of 100 based on reviews from 19 critics. On Rotten Tomatoes, the second season has an approval rating of 78% based on reviews from 9 critics, with an average rating of 5.60/10. Also on Rotten Tomatoes, the fourth season has an approval rating of 100% based on reviews from 8 critics, with an average rating of 8.80/10.

=== Ratings ===
==== Season 1 ====
Viewership and ratings per episode of Miracle Workers
| No. | Title | Air date | Rating (18–49) | Viewers (millions) | DVR (18–49) | DVR viewers (millions) | Total (18–49) | Total viewers (millions) |
|---|---|---|---|---|---|---|---|---|
| 1 | "2 Weeks" | February 12, 2019 | 0.4 | 1.20 | —N/a | 0.88 | —N/a | 2.09 |
| 2 | "13 Days" | February 19, 2019 | 0.4 | 1.03 | —N/a | 0.69 | —N/a | 1.72 |
| 3 | "12 Days" | February 26, 2019 | 0.3 | 0.94 | 0.2 | 0.51 | 0.5 | 1.45 (Note: Live +7 ratings were not available, so Live +3 ratings have been used instead.) |
| 4 | "6 Days" | March 5, 2019 | 0.3 | 0.95 | 0.2 | 0.49 | 0.5 | 1.44 |
| 5 | "3 Days" | March 12, 2019 | 0.3 | 0.94 | —N/a | 0.64 | —N/a | 1.59 |
| 6 | "1 Day" | March 19, 2019 | 0.3 | 0.93 | 0.2 | 0.61 | 0.5 | 1.54 |
| 7 | "1 Hour" | March 26, 2019 | 0.3 | 0.90 | —N/a | 0.65 | —N/a | 1.55 |

==== Season 2 ====
Viewership and ratings per episode of Miracle Workers
| No. | Title | Air date | Rating (18–49) | Viewers (millions) | DVR (18–49) | DVR viewers (millions) | Total (18–49) | Total viewers (millions) |
|---|---|---|---|---|---|---|---|---|
| 1 | "Graduation" | January 28, 2020 | 0.4 | 1.10 | 0.1 | 0.44 | 0.5 | 1.50 |
| 2 | "Help Wanted" | February 4, 2020 | 0.4 | 1.10 | 0.2 | 0.63 | 0.6 | 1.73 |
| 3 | "Road Trip" | February 11, 2020 | 0.3 | 0.81 | 0.2 | 0.55 | 0.5 | 1.36 |
| 4 | "Internship" | February 18, 2020 | 0.3 | 0.84 | 0.1 | 0.27 | 0.3 | 1.11 |
| 5 | "Holiday" | February 25, 2020 | 0.3 | 0.95 | 0.2 | 0.58 | 0.5 | 1.53 |
| 6 | "Music Festival" | March 3, 2020 | 0.3 | 0.85 | —N/a | —N/a | —N/a | —N/a |
| 7 | "Day in Court" | March 10, 2020 | 0.2 | 0.73 | 0.2 | 0.50 | 0.4 | 1.23 |
| 8 | "First Date" | March 17, 2020 | 0.3 | 0.86 | 0.2 | 0.57 | 0.5 | 1.43 |
| 9 | "Moving Out Part 1" | March 24, 2020 | 0.3 | 0.94 | 0.2 | 0.54 | 0.5 | 1.47 |
| 10 | "Moving Out Part 2" | March 31, 2020 | 0.3 | 0.84 | 0.2 | 0.52 | 0.5 | 1.36 |

==== Season 3 ====
Viewership and ratings per episode of Miracle Workers
| No. | Title | Air date | Rating (18–49) | Viewers (millions) | DVR viewers (millions) | Total viewers (millions) |
|---|---|---|---|---|---|---|
| 1 | "Hittin' The Trail" | July 13, 2021 | 0.2 | 0.79 | 0.75 | 1.53 |
| 2 | "Fording the River" | July 20, 2021 | 0.2 | 0.72 | 0.58 | 1.30 |
| 3 | "Hunting Part" | July 27, 2021 | 0.1 | 0.59 | —N/a | —N/a |
| 4 | "What Happens in Branchwater" | August 3, 2021 | 0.2 | 0.63 | —N/a | —N/a |
| 5 | "Meet the Noonans" | August 10, 2021 | 0.3 | 0.86 | 0.75 | 1.61 |
| 6 | "Independence Rock" | August 17, 2021 | 0.2 | 0.59 | 0.76 | 1.35 |
| 7 | "White Savior" | August 24, 2021 | 0.2 | 0.83 | —N/a | —N/a |
| 8 | "Over the Mountain" | August 31, 2021 | 0.2 | 0.69 | —N/a | —N/a |
| 9 | "Stranded" | September 7, 2021 | 0.2 | 0.57 | —N/a | —N/a |
| 10 | "End of the Trail" | September 14, 2021 | 0.2 | 0.59 | —N/a | —N/a |

=== Accolade ===
Radcliffe was nominated for Choice Comedy TV Actor for his work on the series at the 2019 Teen Choice Awards.

== See also ==
- List of films about angels
