= Single Drunk Female =

2022 American comedy television series

- Promotional poster
- Genre: Comedy drama
- Created by: Simone Finch
- Starring: Sofia Black-D'Elia; Rebecca Henderson; Sasha Compère; Lily Mae Harrington; Garrick Bernard; Ally Sheedy; Ian Gomez
- Composers: Keir Schmidt; Ryan Lott; Tony Kanal
- Country of origin: United States
- Original language: English
- No. of seasons: 2
- No. of episodes: 20

Production
- Executive producers: Phil Traill; Nora Silver; Simone Finch; Leslye Headland; Jenni Konner; Daisy Gardner; John Riggi
- Producers: Christina Varotsis; Angi Bones; Chloe Keenan; Isaiah Lester; Jessica Watson; Dianne Ashford; Michael C. Bolton
- Cinematography: Brian Burgoyne; Adam Silver; Andy Rydzewski; Adam McDaid
- Editors: Agnès Challe-Grandits; Brian Merken; Nicole Artzer; Libby Cuenin; Adam Neely; Gina Hirsch; Luke Pebler
- Running time: 20–25 minutes
- Production companies: Jenni Konner Productions; Shoot to Midnight; 8th in State Productions; 20th Television

Original release
- Network: Freeform
- Release: January 20, 2022 – May 10, 2023

Single Drunk Female (stylized as Single ~~Drunk~~ Female) is an American comedy drama television series created by Simone Finch that premiered on Freeform on January 20, 2022, and ended on May 10, 2023. In April 2022, the series was renewed for a second season, which premiered on Freeform on April 12, 2023, with all second-season episodes released on Hulu on April 13. In June 2023, the series was cancelled after two seasons.

== Plot ==
After a terribly embarrassing public meltdown in New York, alcoholic Samantha Fink has only one chance to avoid jail time. She needs to stay sober and has to move back to Boston and stay with her bossy mother, Carol. Samantha tries to make the best of the situation, but is confronted with the ghosts of her past, which drove her to alcohol addiction in the first place. At first Samantha is reluctant to take a new path, but when her childhood best friend Brit reveals that she will be marrying Samantha's ex-boyfriend, Samantha has to admit that her partying life can't go on like this.

== Cast and characters ==
=== Main ===
- Sofia Black-D'Elia as Samantha Fink, a 28-year-old alcoholic who is forced to move back home after hitting rock bottom
- Rebecca Henderson as Olivia (season 1, recurring season 2), sponsor of Samantha at Alcoholics Anonymous
- Sasha Compère as Brit, Samantha's ex-BFF who is a doctor
- Lily Mae Harrington as Felicia, Samantha's drinking buddy and current BFF
- Garrick Bernard as James, a fellow member of Alcoholics Anonymous
- Ally Sheedy as Carol Fink, Samantha's mother
- Ian Gomez as Bob (season 2; recurring season 1), Carol's boyfriend

=== Recurring ===
- Jon Glaser as Nathaniel, Samantha's former boss
- Madison Shepard as Gail Williams, Samantha's probation officer
- Jojo Brown as Melinda "Mindy" Moy, Samantha's boss at Giovanni's grocery store
- Charlie Hall as Joel, Samantha's ex-boyfriend and Brit's fiancé
- Madeline Wise as Stephanie, Olivia's wife
- Tom Simmons as Ronnie
- Ben Thompson as Peter
- Ricky Velez as Alex (season 2), Samantha's new love interest

=== Special guest stars ===
- Bob the Drag Queen as herself (season 2)
- Molly Ringwald as Alice (season 2), Carol's sister-in-law and Samantha's aunt
- Busy Philipps as Darby (season 2), Olivia's sponsor at Alcoholics Anonymous who has been 20 years sober

== Production ==
=== Development ===
On September 25, 2019, Freeform gave Single Drunk Female a pilot order. On February 26, 2021, Freeform gave production a series order consisting of ten episodes. The series is created by Simone Finch, who also executive produces alongside Leslye Headland, Jenni Konner, and Phil Traill. Headland also directed the pilot while Finch wrote the pilot. 20th Television is involved with producing the series. On April 26, 2022, Freeform renewed the series for a second season. On June 30, 2023, Freeform cancelled the series after two seasons.

=== Casting ===
Upon the pilot order announcement, Sofia Black-D'Elia and Ally Sheedy were cast to star. Upon the series order announcement, Rebecca Henderson, Sasha Compère, Lily Mae Harrington and Garrick Bernard joined the main cast. On January 7, 2022, Jojo Brown, Charlie Hall, Madison Shepard, Ian Gomez, Madeline Wise, and Jon Glaser were cast in recurring roles. On January 11, 2023, it was announced that Busy Philipps and Ricky Velez had been added to the cast in recurring roles in the second season, with Charlie Hall set to return as Sam's ex-boyfriend Joel.

== Episodes ==
=== Series overview ===
Season	Episodes	Originally released	
Season	Episodes	First released	Last released
1	10	January 20, 2022	March 17, 2022
2	10	April 12, 2023	May 10, 2023

=== Season 1 (2022) ===
No. overall	No. in season	Title	Directed by	Written by	Original release date	Prod. code	U.S. viewers (millions)
1	1	"Pilot"	Leslye Headland	Simone Finch	January 20, 2022	IGCG79	0.194
2	2	"One Day at a Time"	Phil Traill	Simone Finch	January 20, 2022	IGCG02	0.162
3	3	"I'm Sorry, But..."	Katrelle N. Kindred	Jessica Watson	January 27, 2022	IGCG03	0.121
4	4	"Shamrocks and Shenanigans"	Travon Free	Chloe Keenan	February 3, 2022	IGCG04	0.107
5	5	"Sober for the D and V"	John Riggi	Lauren Bans	February 10, 2022	IGCG05	0.091
6	6	"Look Me Up Sometime"	Kimmy Gatewood	Aminatou Sow	February 17, 2022	IGCG06	0.091
7	7	"New York"	Keith Powell	Daisy Gardner	February 24, 2022	IGCG07	0.072
8	8	"James"	Leslye Headland; Adam Silver	Jenni Konner	March 3, 2022	IGCG08	0.090
9	9	"Higher Parent"	Travon Free	Simone Finch	March 10, 2022	IGCG09	0.051
10	10	"A Wedding"	Mary Wigmore	Jay Dyer	March 17, 2022	IGCG10	0.089

=== Season 2 (2023) ===
No. overall	No. in season	Title	Directed by	Written by	Original release date (Note: All ten episodes of the second season were released on Hulu on April 13, 2023, ahead of its weekly Freeform premieres.)	Prod. code	U.S. viewers (millions)
11	1	"Promotion"	Phil Traill	Lauren Bans	April 12, 2023	2GCG01	0.151
12	2	"Grant Me the Serenity"	Heather Jack	Jessica Watson	April 12, 2023	2GCG02	0.121
13	3	"Normie"	Phil Traill	Chloe Keenan	April 19, 2023	2GCG03	0.090
14	4	"4th Step"	Mary Wigmore	Simone Finch	April 19, 2023	2GCG04	0.057
15	5	"Defining Relationships"	Ahmed Ibrahim	Ama Quao	April 26, 2023	2GCG05	0.074
16	6	"Keeping it Professional"	Travon Free & Martin Desmond Roe	Mithra B. Alavi & Heather Gromley	April 26, 2023	2GCG06	0.052
17	7	"Shiva"	John Riggi	John Riggi	May 3, 2023	2GCG07	0.082
18	8	"Darby"	Tyne Rafaeli	Daisy Gardner	May 3, 2023	2GCG08	N/A
19	9	"Coming Clean"	Kimmy Gatewood	Jessica Larson & Ekaterina Vladimirova	May 10, 2023	2GCG09	0.081
20	10	"Group of Drunks"	John Riggi	Richard Brandon Manus	May 10, 2023	2GCG10	0.070

== Broadcast and release ==
The series premiered on Freeform on January 20, 2022. The second season premiered on April 12, 2023, with all ten second-season episodes released on Hulu on April 13. The series finale aired on May 10, 2023. The series was removed from Hulu on July 1, 2023.

== Reception ==
=== Critical response ===
For the first season, the review aggregator website Rotten Tomatoes reported a 96% approval rating with an average rating of 7.8/10, based on 25 critic reviews. The website's critics consensus reads, "Single Drunk Female's clear-eyed chronicle of the challenges of sobriety is a joy, thanks in part to some spiky satire and Sofia Black-D'Elia's spirited star turn." Metacritic, which uses a weighted average, assigned a score of 76 out of 100 based on 11 critics, indicating "generally favorable reviews".

Leila Latif of The A.V. Club gave the first season a B and said, "Sofia Black-D'Elia makes for an incredible lead across all 10 episodes, selling every moment of Samantha's story as a woman with high-functioning alcoholism rebuilding her life." Reviewing the series' first season for The Guardian, Ellen E Jones gave a rating of 4 out of 5 stars and described it as "a show that has most to say at the very point when other shows lose interest."

On Rotten Tomatoes, the second season holds an approval rating of 100% with an average rating of 7.8/10, based on 6 critic reviews. Metacritic gave the second season a weighted average score of 81 out of 100 based on 4 critics, indicating "universal acclaim".

=== Ratings ===
==== Season 1 ====
Viewership and ratings per episode of Single Drunk Female
No.	Title	Air date	Rating (18–49)	Viewers (millions)
1	"Pilot"	January 20, 2022	0.08	0.194
2	"One Day at a Time"	January 20, 2022	0.06	0.162
3	"I'm Sorry, But..."	January 27, 2022	0.04	0.121
4	"Shamrocks and Shenanigans"	February 3, 2022	0.03	0.107
5	"Sober for the D and V"	February 10, 2022	0.02	0.091
6	"Look Me Up Sometime"	February 17, 2022	0.03	0.091
7	"New York"	February 24, 2022	0.02	0.072
8	"James"	March 3, 2022	0.02	0.090
9	"Higher Parent"	March 10, 2022	0.01	0.051
10	"A Wedding"	March 17, 2022	0.03	0.089

==== Season 2 ====
Viewership and ratings per episode of Single Drunk Female
No.	Title	Air date	Rating (18–49)	Viewers (millions)
1	"Promotion"	April 12, 2023	0.04	0.151
2	"Grant Me Serenity"	April 12, 2023	0.03	0.121
3	"Normie"	April 19, 2023	0.05	0.090
4	"4th Step"	April 19, 2023	0.03	0.057
5	"Defining Relationships"	April 26, 2023	0.04	0.074
6	"Keeping it Professional"	April 26, 2023	0.03	0.052
7	"Shiva"	May 3, 2023	0.03	0.082
9	"Coming Clean"	May 10, 2023	0.05	0.081
10	"Group of Drunks"	May 10, 2023	0.05	0.070

=== Accolades ===
In 2021, the series won the IMDbPro Top 200 Scripted TV Recipients for ReFrame Stamp.
