= Mamoudou Athie =

American actor (born 1988)

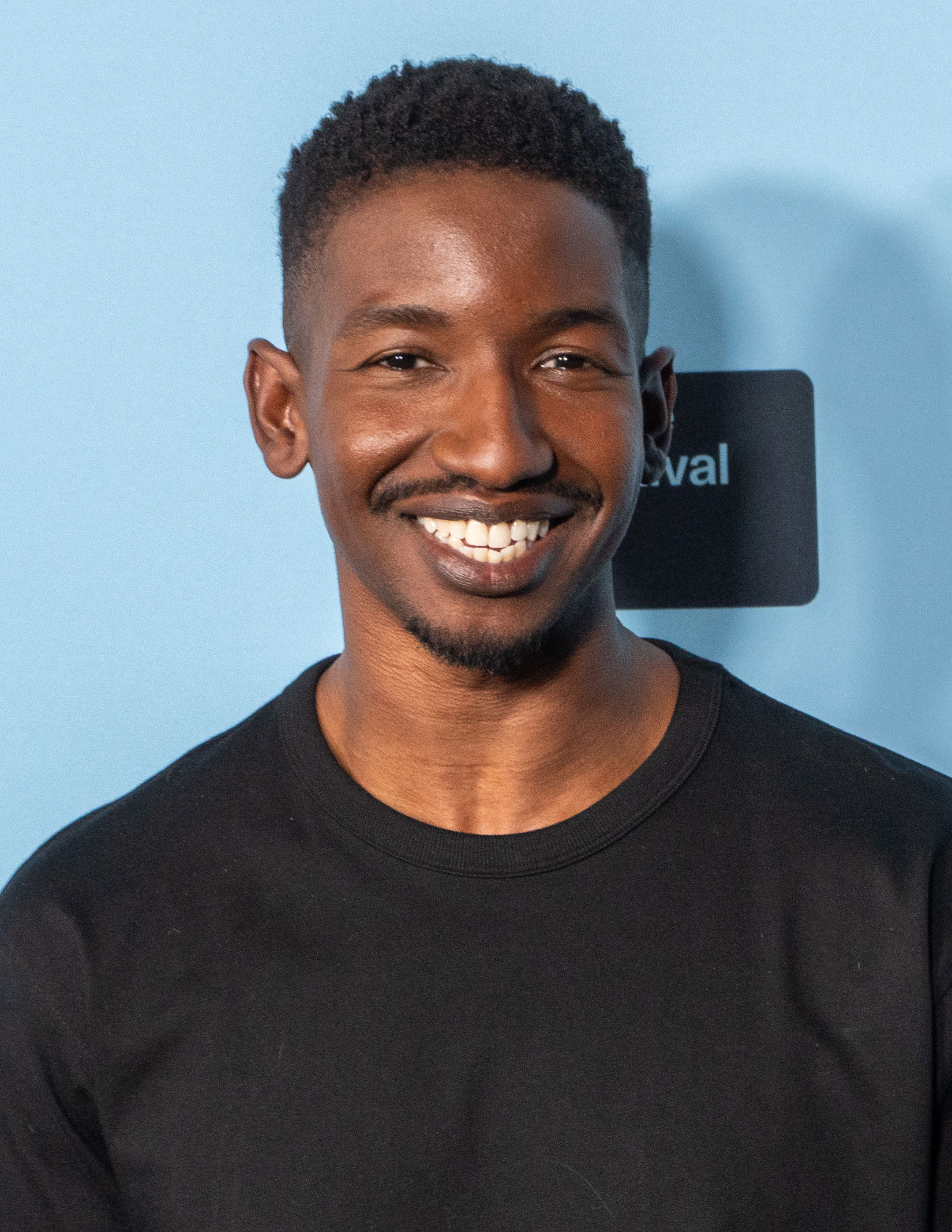
- Athie in 2025
- Born: 1988 (age 37–38); Mauritania
- Education: William Esper Studio; Yale University (MFA)
- Occupation: Actor
- Years active: 2012–present

Mamoudou Athie (/ˈmɑːməduː ˈɑːtʃeɪ/ MAH-mə-doo AH-chay; born 1988) is an American actor. He is known for his starring roles in the feature films Uncorked and Black Box, and had the leading role in the Netflix horror series Archive 81 (2022). He has also had supporting roles in many films, including The Burial (2023) and Kinds of Kindness (2024), as well as in the television series Sorry for Your Loss (2018–2019), the FXX anthology Cake (2019), and others. He voiced Wade Ripple in the Pixar animated film Elemental (2023). He has also appeared in several stage productions.

== Early life and education ==
Mamadou Athie was born in 1988 (Note: Athie's age of 27 in May 2015 and 28 in November 2017 makes his birth year 1988.) in Mauritania, the son of a diplomat father who received political asylum in the U.S. when Athie was six months old. Athie grew up in New Carrollton, Maryland, outside of Washington, D.C.

He studied acting at the William Esper Studio in the Two-Year Professional Actor Training Program. He graduated with an MFA from the Yale School of Drama in 2014.

== Career ==
Athie began his career in theater, starring off-Broadway in 2015 in The Mystery of Love and Sex.

He had supporting roles in the films Patti Cake$ (2017), The Circle (2017), Unicorn Store (2017), The Front Runner (2018), Underwater (2020), Jurassic World Dominion (2022), The Burial (2023), and Kinds of Kindness (2024).

He also starred in the television series The Get Down (2016–2017), The Detour (2017), Sorry for Your Loss (2018–2019), and the FXX anthology Cake (2019).

He had his first feature film starring roles in 2020, starring in Uncorked and Black Box, and had the leading role in the Netflix horror series Archive 81 (2022).

He also voiced Wade Ripple in the 2023 Pixar film Elemental.

== Filmography ==
=== Film ===
Key
†	Denotes films that have not yet been released

Year	Title	Role	Notes
2015	Experimenter	Crying Man	
2016	Jean of the Joneses	Ray Malcom	
2017	Patti Cake$	Basterd	
2017	One Percent More Humid	Jack	
2017	The Circle	Jared	
2017	Unicorn Store	Virgil	
2018	The Front Runner	AJ Parker	
2020	Underwater	Rodrigo Nagenda	
2020	Uncorked	Elijah	
2020	Black Box	Nolan Wright	
2022	Jurassic World Dominion	Ramsay Cole	
2023	Elemental	Wade Ripple	Voice role
2023	The Burial	Hal Dockins	
2023	The Boy and the Heron	Parakeet	Voice role (English dub)
2024	Kinds of Kindness	Will / Neil / Morgue nurse	
2024	An Almost Christmas Story	Pelly	Voice role; short film
2025	By Design	Olivier	
2026	Wardriver	Oscar	
2026	The Drama	Mike	
2026	Via Negativa †	Brian	
TBA	Hystoria †	—N/a	Post-production

=== Television ===
Year	Title	Role	Notes
2015	Madam Secretary	Staffer	Episode: "The Ninth Circle"
2016	Me & Mean Margaret	Charles	Unsold pilot
2016–2017	The Get Down	Grandmaster Flash	Recurring role
2017	The Detour	Carl	Recurring role (season 2)
2018–2019	Sorry for Your Loss	Matt Greer	Main cast
2019	Cake	Jerome	Recurring role (season 1)
2019	Oh Jerome, No	Jerome	Main cast, miniseries
2022	Archive 81	Dan Turner	Main cast
2023	Strange Planet	Being #1 (voice)	Episode: "Key Change"

=== Video games ===
Year	Title	Role	Notes
2022	Jurassic World Evolution 2	Ramsey Cole	Biosyn Dominion expansion

=== Theater ===
Selected professional credits

Year	Title	Role	Venue
2012	Tripolitania	Xavier	Williamstown Theatre Festival
2012	Becoming Sylvia	Ensemble	Williamstown Theatre Festival
2013	Hamlet	Voltimand	Yale Repertory Theatre
2014	Generations	Boyfriend	Soho Repertory Theatre
2015	The Mystery of Love and Sex	Jonny	Mitzi E. Newhouse Theater
2024	Good Bones	Travis	Public Theatre

== Awards and nominations ==
Athie was nominated for Primetime Emmy Award for Outstanding Actor in a Short Form Comedy or Drama Series for his performance in Cake.
