= Dreams in Nightmares =

2024 American drama film

- Theatrical release poster
- Directed by: Shatara Michelle Ford
- Screenplay by: Shatara Michelle Ford
- Produced by: Shatara Michelle Ford; Pin-Chun Liu; Naïma Abed; Adam Wyatt Tate; Josh Peters; Robina Riccitiello; Ben Stillman; Ana Leocha; Tyler Bagley; Chris Quintos Cathcart
- Starring: Denée Benton; Mars Storm Rucker; Dezi Bing; Sasha Compère; Charlie Barnett; Molly Bernard; Alfie Fuller; Malek Mouzon; Joss Barton; Jasmin Savoy Brown; Regina Taylor; Robert Wisdom
- Cinematography: Ludovica Isidori
- Edited by: Cyndi Trissel
- Music by: Lia Ouyang Rusli
- Production companies: 120E Films; Spark Features; Tango Entertainment; Birchall Entertainment; Each Other Films; Track Eight Pictures; Paradise City; Verdant Peak Films
- Distributed by: Lunette Films
- Release dates: August 1, 2024 (BlackStar); August 21, 2026 (United States)
- Running time: 120 minutes
- Countries: United States; United Kingdom; Taiwan
- Language: English

Dreams in Nightmares is a 2024 internationally co-produced drama film, written, directed, and produced by Shatara Michelle Ford. It stars Denée Benton, Mars Storm Rucker, Dezi Bing, Sasha Compère, Charlie Barnett, Molly Bernard, Alfie Fuller, Malek Mouzon, Joss Barton, Jasmin Savoy Brown, Regina Taylor and Robert Wisdom.

The film had its world premiere at the BlackStar Film Festival on August 1, 2024, and was released in the United States on August 21, 2026, by Lunette Films.

== Premise ==
Three friends road trip across the Midwestern United States in search of their friend who has disappeared off the grid.

== Cast ==
- Denée Benton as Z
- Mars Storm Rucker as Kel
- Dezi Bing as Lauren
- Sasha Compère as Tasha
- Charlie Barnett as Reece
- Molly Bernard as Jamie
- Alfie Fuller as Trish
- Malek Mouzon as Dionne
- Joss Barton as Toni
- Jasmin Savoy Brown as Sabrina
- Regina Taylor as Bernice
- Robert Wisdom as Virgil

== Production ==
Principal photography took place in the Midwest.

== Release ==
It had its world premiere at the BlackStar Film Festival on August 1, 2024. It also screened at the 75th Berlin International Film Festival in February 2025. In May 2026, Lunette Films acquired distribution rights to the film, with plans for a summer release. The first trailer was released by IndieWire in June 2026, which also announced that the film would open theatrically in New York City on August 21, 2026, followed by Los Angeles on August 28, before expanding to additional U.S. markets in September.

== Reception ==
On the review aggregator website Rotten Tomatoes, 100% of 26 critics' reviews are positive, with an average rating of 7.9/10. Metacritic, which uses a weighted average, assigned the film a score of 86 out of 100, based on nine critics, indicating "universal acclaim".

Variety described it as a "a step up from their debut Test Pattern. The canvas is bigger, the rhythm slower yet more confident". Richard Brody, writing in The New Yorker, described Ford's direction as giving "rise to performances of an extraordinary immediacy, a sense of commitment to the characters’ quests for sexual freedom, freedom from fear, a measure of financial stability that isn’t necessarily wealth but is the absence of panic".
