= The SOMM Journal =

American trade magazine for sommeliers

- Frequency: Monthly
- First issue: April 2008
- Country: United States
- Based in: Encino, California
- Language: English
- Website: www.sommjournal.com
- ISSN: 1944-074X

The SOMM Journal is a subscription-based magazine publication, founded in 2008 for sommeliers and others in the restaurant and wine business. The magazine summarized consumer, restaurant, and wine trends and news for wine professionals.

== History ==
Sommelier Journal was first published in April 2008. Its editor is David Vogels. At the initial phase, the magazine had seven contributing editors: Shayn Bjornholm, Beverley Blanning, Randy Caparoso, Catherine Fallis, David Furer, Joyce Goldstein and Jim Meehan. It also has ten members on its Editorial Advisory Board: Robert Bath, Jesse Becker, Gilles de Chambure, Fred Dexheimer, Christie Dufault, Tim Gaiser, David Glancy, Bobby Stuckey, Alder Yarrow, and Brett Zimmerman.

It was reported that the magazine would close its doors in 2013. It temporarily ceased publication in October 2013. In December 2013 TPM Custom Publishing headed by Meridith May acquired Sommelier Journal. It was restarted with the name The SOMM Journal in Spring 2014. The headquarters moved to Encino, California.

== Philosophy ==
According to an interview with wine writer Tom Wark, Vogels' family has operated and published a professional journal for orthodontists for more than 40 years. While fostering a growing interest in wine, he conducted market research and determined there was no publication targeted at the niche of wine professionals, which he described as "almost empty" prior to the debut of the magazine.

The magazine's self-described mission was to offer wine knowledge, best business practices, and service advice to professionals. Vogels said he made an effort to be educated about wines to cater to the audience. The San Francisco Chronicle describes the magazine as “informative without being preachy."

The publication is unique among wine magazines in that it does not issue numerical scores. For the most part, tasting notes without scores were included instead, including "Hot Picks" from the magazine's Editorial Board. The only place Sommelier Journal did use numbers is in its "Tasting Panels", which used a statistical plot of the opinions of a panel of tasters. The tasters’ opinions were summarized in a box plot graph.

== See also ==
- List of food and drink magazines
