= Shatara Michelle Ford =

American director, writer, and producer

- Occupations: Director, writer, producer
- Years active: 2016– present
- Notable work: Test Pattern

Shatara Michelle Ford is an American director, writer, and producer. Their feature film directorial debut Test Pattern (2019) received critical acclaim.

== Career ==
Ford gained prominence in 2019 for Test Pattern, their feature film directorial debut. The story follows Renesha and Evan, a young interracial couple seeking medical care after Renesha is sexually assaulted by a stranger. Ford also wrote and produced the film. Test Pattern debuted in August 2019 at the BlackStar Film Festival, where it received the Lionsgate/STARZ Producer Award. Additional accolades were awarded at the New Orleans Film Festival and the deadCENTER Film Festival.

The script for their forthcoming coming-of-age film, Queen Elizabeth, was named to the 2017 Black List. It is in development as of 2021.

In 2024, Ford directed, wrote, and produced Dreams in Nightmares following three friends roadtripping across the Midwestern United States in search of their friend who has disappeared off the grid.

They cited German Expressionism and Alfred Hitchcock as key influences.

== Personal life ==
Ford was raised in St. Louis, Missouri. Ford is non-binary and uses they/them pronouns. Ford has an MFA in screenwriting from Royal Holloway, University of London and a BA in political studies and sociology from Pitzer College.

== Filmography ==
Year	Title	Director	Writer	Producer	Notes
2012	Leftover	No	No	Yes	Short film
2015	Teachers	No	No	Yes	Short film
2016	Afro-Woman: 2016 CE	Yes	Yes	Yes	Short film
2019	Test Pattern	Yes	Yes	Yes	
2024	Dreams in Nightmares	Yes	Yes	Yes	

== Awards and nominations ==
Year	Award	Category	Work	Result	Ref.
2019	BlackStar Film Festival	Lionsgate/STARZ Producer Award	Test Pattern	Won	
2019	New Orleans Film Festival	Best Narrative Feature	Test Pattern	Won	
2020	DeadCENTER Film Festival	Special Jury Prize	Test Pattern	Won	
2021	Gotham Awards	Best Feature	Test Pattern	Nominated	
2021	Gotham Awards	Bingham Ray Breakthrough Director Award	Test Pattern	Nominated	
2021	Los Angeles Film Critics Circle Awards	New Generation Prize	Test Pattern	Won (tied with Prayers for the Stolen)	
2021	San Francisco Bay Area Film Critics Circle	Special Citation for Independent Cinema	Test Pattern	Won (tied with Kuessipan)	
2021	Women Film Critics Circle Awards	Josephine Baker Award	Test Pattern	Nominated	
2022	Austin Film Critics Association	Special Honorary Award	Test Pattern	Won	
2022	Black Reel Awards	Outstanding Independent Film	Test Pattern	Nominated	
2022	Independent Spirit Awards	Best First Feature	Test Pattern	Nominated	
2022	Independent Spirit Awards	Best First Screenplay	Test Pattern	Nominated	
2022	NAACP Image Awards	Outstanding Independent Motion Picture	Test Pattern	Nominated	
2026	Gotham Awards	Best Feature	Dreams in Nightmares	Nominated	
