= Denée Benton =

American actress and singer (born 1991)

- Benton in 2026
- Born: December 31, 1991 (age 34); Eustis, Florida, U.S.
- Education: Carnegie Mellon University (BFA)
- Occupations: Actor, singer
- Years active: 2013–present
- Spouse: Carl Lundstedt (m. 2020; div. 2023)

Denée Benton (born December 31, 1991) is an American actress and singer. She is best known for her performance as Natasha Rostova in the 2016 musical Natasha, Pierre & The Great Comet of 1812 on Broadway, for which she was nominated for a Tony Award. Benton's other Broadway credits include the role of Eliza Hamilton in Hamilton (2018) and the role of Cinderella in Into the Woods (2022). Her television acting credits include UnREAL and the role of journalist Peggy Scott on The Gilded Age.

== Early life and education ==
Benton was born and raised in Eustis, Florida. Her mother was a journalist, therapist, and businesswoman; her father was a mayor of Eustis and an airport executive. Rodgers and Hammerstein's Cinderella was an early inspiration for her desire to act.

She attended Trinity Preparatory School in Winter Park, Florida, before graduating from Carnegie Mellon University in 2014.

== Career ==
Benton's first prominent professional role was her role as Nabulungi in the West End and U.S. national tour of The Book of Mormon.

Benton was cast in the titular role of Natasha Rostova in Natasha, Pierre & The Great Comet of 1812 with the American Repertory Theatre; she later made her Broadway debut opposite Josh Groban as Pierre when the show opened at the Imperial Theatre on November 14, 2016. Benton was nominated for the Tony Award for Best Actress in a Musical for her role in the show. Later in the run, she starred opposite Okieriete Onaodowan and the show's creator Dave Malloy as Pierre. She appeared on The Late Show with Stephen Colbert on December 12, 2016, to discuss the role.

Benton gained wider prominence in her recurring role on the second season of the Lifetime series, UnREAL, as Ruby Carter in 2016.

On October 17, 2018, it was announced that Benton would assume the role of Eliza Hamilton in the Broadway production of Hamilton, beginning performances on October 30, starring opposite Michael Luwoye, Daniel Breaker, Mandy Gonzalez and James Monroe Iglehart. She left the show on December 8, 2019.

In 2022, Benton started acting as Peggy Scott in the main cast of the HBO historical drama series The Gilded Age, alongside Louisa Jacobson, Cynthia Nixon and Christine Baranski. In 2023 she was nominated alongside the cast for the Screen Actors Guild Award for Outstanding Performance by an Ensemble in a Drama Series.

In May 2022, Benton played the role of Cinderella in Stephen Sondheim's Into the Woods at New York City Center opposite Heather Headley, Neil Patrick Harris, Sara Bareilles, and Gavin Creel. In November, she reprised her role replacing Krysta Rodriguez in the Broadway revival of the show. She left the production on December 24. She would star opposite Creel, Brian d'Arcy James, Patina Miller, Stephanie J. Block, Montego Glover, Andy Karl, Joshua Henry, and Joaquina Kalukango.

In December 2023, it was announced that Denee will star as Susan in the production of Tick, Tick... Boom! at The Kennedy Center.

== Personal life ==
Benton began dating Carl Lundstedt in 2014, whom she met in her acting program at Carnegie Mellon University. They were married from 2020 to 2023. She is queer.

== Theatre credits ==
Year(s)	Production	Role	Location	Category
2012	Annie	Star-To-Be	Benedum Center	Regional
2012	Fiddler on the Roof	Ensemble	Benedum Center	Regional
2012	Sunset Boulevard	Ensemble	Benedum Center	Regional
2013	The Crucible	Rebecca Nurse	Carnegie Mellon University	Regional
2014–2015	The Book of Mormon	Nabulungi	-	U.S. National Tour
2015	The Book of Mormon	Nabulungi	Prince of Wales Theatre	West End
2015–2016	Natasha, Pierre & The Great Comet of 1812	Natasha Rostova	American Repertory Theater	Regional, Pre-Broadway
2016–2017	Natasha, Pierre & The Great Comet of 1812	Natasha Rostova	Imperial Theatre	Broadway
2017	Of Thee I Sing	Mary Turner	Carnegie Hall	MasterVoices Concert
2018–2019	Hamilton	Eliza Hamilton	Richard Rodgers Theatre	Broadway
2022	Into the Woods	Cinderella	New York City Center	Off-Broadway, Encores!
2022	Into the Woods	Cinderella	St. James Theatre	Broadway
2024	tick, tick... BOOM!	Susan	Kennedy Center	Regional
2025	Pericles	Thaisa	The Public Theater	Off-Broadway
2026	School Girls; Or, the African Mean Girls Play	Paulina Sarpong	Samuel J. Friedman Theatre	Broadway

== Filmography ==
=== Film ===
Year	Title	Role	Notes
2013	The Narrative of Dalvin Reynolds	Felicia	Short film
2018	Mother's Milk	Lark	
2019	Our Friend	Charlotte	
2023	Genie	Julie	
2024	Dreams in Nightmares	Z	

=== Television ===
Year	Title	Role	Notes
2016	UnREAL	Ruby Carter	10 episodes
2018	25	Morgan	Television film
2022–present	The Gilded Age	Peggy Scott	Main cast
2026	The Drop: A Snowfall Saga	Rochelle Kinsey	Supporting

== Awards and nominations ==
Year	Award	Category	Work	Result	Ref.
2016	Elliot Norton Award	Outstanding Performance by an Actress	Natasha, Pierre & The Great Comet of 1812	Nominated	
2016	IRNE Awards	Best Actress in a Musical	Natasha, Pierre & The Great Comet of 1812	Nominated	
2017	Tony Awards	Best Leading Actress in a Musical	Natasha, Pierre & The Great Comet of 1812	Nominated	
2017	Drama League Awards	Distinguished Performance	Natasha, Pierre & The Great Comet of 1812	Nominated	
2017	Theatre World Awards		Natasha, Pierre & The Great Comet of 1812	Honoree	
2023	Screen Actors Guild Awards	Outstanding Performance by an Ensemble in a Drama Series	The Gilded Age	Nominated	
2025	Helen Hayes Awards	Outstanding Supporting Performer in a Musical – Hayes	tick, tick... BOOM!	Won	
2026	Critics' Choice Awards	Best Supporting Actress in a Drama Series	The Gilded Age	Nominated	
