= Philippe Nahon =

French actor (1938–2020)

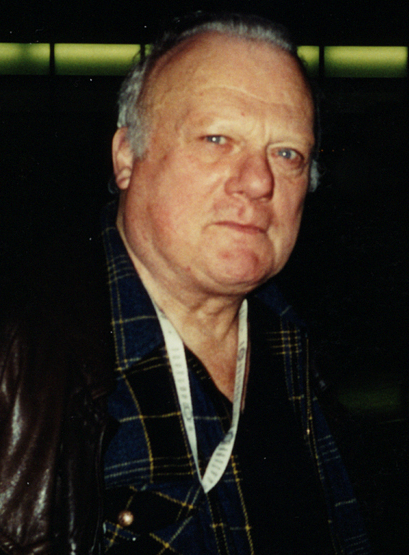
- Nahon in 1999
- Born: 24 December 1938; Paris, France
- Died: 19 April 2020 (aged 81); Paris, France
- Occupation: Actor
- Years active: 1962–2019
- Spouse: Elisabeth Weissman (m?. -2020; his death)

Philippe Nahon (French: [na.ɔ̃]; 24 December 1938 – 19 April 2020) was a French actor. He was known for his roles in French horror and thriller films, including I Stand Alone, Humains, Calvaire, The Pack and Haute Tension, and was featured as a nameless butcher in three films by Gaspar Noé: Carne, I Stand Alone, and Irréversible. He died from an illness and COVID-19 on 19 April 2020.

== Filmography ==
| Year | Title | Role | Director | Notes |
|---|---|---|---|---|
| 1962 | Le Doulos | Remy | Jean-Pierre Melville | |
| 1972 | Les camisards | Reboul | René Allio | |
| 1974 | Les doigts dans la tête | The Viennese | Jacques Doillon | |
| 1974 | Ardéchois-coeur-fidèle | Poitevin | Jean-Pierre Gallo | TV mini-series |
| 1975 | Azev: le tsar de la nuit | Tatavov | Guy Lessertisseur | TV movie |
| 1976 | Un mari, c'est un mari | Thomas | Serge Friedman | |
| 1977 | Solemn Communion | A unionist | René Féret | |
| 1977 | Messieurs les jurés | Fernand Rabuteau | André Michel | TV series (1 episode) |
| 1977 | Désiré Lafarge | Carl | Jean-Pierre Gallo | TV series (2 episodes) |
| 1977–1983 | Les Cinq Dernières Minutes | Various | Éric Le Hung, Guy Lessertisseur, ... | TV series (5 episodes) |
| 1978 | Ne pleure pas | The CRS Captain | Jacques Ertaud | |
| 1978 | La passion | 2nd thief | Raoul Sangla | TV movie |
| 1978 | Les enquêtes du commissaire Maigret | Demarie | René Lucot | TV series (1 episode) |
| 1978 | Brigade des mineurs | Prevant | Peter Kassovitz and Guy Lessertisseur | TV series (2 episodes) |
| 1979 | Les héritiers | Hi-Fi installer | Jean-Pierre Gallo | TV series (1 episode) |
| 1980 | Ça va? Ça va! | The neighbor | Jacques Krier | TV movie |
| 1980 | Les 400 coups de Virginie | The rescuer | Bernard Queysanne | TV mini-series |
| 1981 | Clara et les Chics Types | A cop | Jacques Monnet | |
| 1981 | Commissaire Moulin | Pillette | Guy Lefranc and Jean Kerchbron | TV series (2 episodes) |
| 1982 | La rescousse | Edmond | Jacques Krier | TV movie |
| 1982 | Malesherbes, avocat du roi | Bondy's delegate | Yves-André Hubert | TV movie |
| 1982 | Ralentir école | Ruffin | Alain Dhouailly | TV movie |
| 1983 | La java des ombres | Boussac | Romain Goupil | |
| 1983 | Richelieu ou La journée des dupes | Tréville | Jean-Dominique de La Rochefoucauld | TV movie |
| 1984 | Julien Fontanes, magistrat | A cop | Daniel Moosmann | TV series (1 episode) |
| 1984 | Les enquêtes du commissaire Maigret | Inspector Janvier | Georges Ferraro | TV series (1 episode) |
| 1985 | Mort carnaval | Sandor Pajor | Daniel Van Cutsem | TV movie |
| 1985 | Les colonnes du ciel | The guard #2 | Gabriel Axel | TV mini-series |
| 1987 | Inutile de crier | Pierlot | André Cortines Clavero | short |
| 1987 | Bonne chance monsieur Pic ! | The recruiter | Maurice Failevic | TV movie |
| 1987 | Le gerfaut | Guégan | Marion Sarraut | TV mini-series |
| 1987 | Les enquêtes du commissaire Maigret | Inspector Vacher | Georges Ferraro | TV series (1 episode) |
| 1988 | Let Sleeping Cops Lie | Sergeant #2 | José Pinheiro | |
| 1989 | La comtesse de Charny | Pierre Louis Roederer | Marion Sarraut | TV mini-series |
| 1990 | Haute tension | The magician | Patrick Dromgoole | TV series (1 episode) |
| 1991 | Toubab Bi | The concierge | Moussa Touré | |
| 1991 | Carne | The Butcher | Gaspar Noé | short Clermont-Ferrand International Short Film Festival – Best Actor |
| 1993 | Lola Posse | | Benoît Cohen | short |
| 1993 | Jour de fauche | | Vincent Monnet | short |
| 1993 | Red Shoe Diaries | Groom | Rafael Eisenman | TV series (1 episode) |
| 1993 | Ferbac | Monsieur Mortier | Bruno Gantillon | TV series (1 episode) |
| 1994 | Pigalle | Lezzi | Karim Dridi | |
| 1994 | Carences | Monsieur Jules | David Rozenberg | |
| 1994 | Extrême limite | Bracco | Klaus Biedermann | TV series (1 episode) |
| 1995 | La Haine | Police Chief | Mathieu Kassovitz | |
| 1995 | Les Anges gardiens | Taxi Driver | Jean-Marie Poiré | |
| 1995 | Faut pas rire du bonheur | André | Guillaume Nicloux | |
| 1995 | Histoire d'Eau | Inspector | Fabien Ferreri | short |
| 1996 | A Self Made Hero | The General | Jacques Audiard | |
| 1996 | Les frères Gravet | The father | René Féret | |
| 1996 | Le marché du sport | Darieusec | Luc Béraud | TV movie |
| 1997 | Seule | | Erick Zonca | short |
| 1997 | Rien que des grandes personnes | | Jean-Marc Brondolo | short |
| 1997 | Rencontres | The homeless | Arnaud Cafaxe | short |
| 1997 | Paloma | Feuillant | Marianne Lamour | TV movie |
| 1997 | Noël en Quercy | Maurice Lacassagne | Raymond Pinoteau | TV movie |
| 1997 | Une femme d'honneur | Robert Staron | Marion Sarraut | TV series (1 episode) |
| 1998 | I Stand Alone | The Butcher | Gaspar Noé | Festival International du Film Francophone de Namur – Best Actor |
| 1998 | The Visitors II: The Corridors of Time | Supermarket's owner | Jean-Marie Poiré | |
| 1998 | Le poulpe | Bar's owner | Guillaume Nicloux | |
| 1998 | Le monde à l'envers | Anne's father | Rolando Colla | |
| 1998 | Cantique de la racaille | Inspector of Havre | Vincent Ravalec | |
| 1998 | Comme une bête | Skaffar | Patrick Schulmann | |
| 1998 | Sodomites | A spectator | Gaspar Noé | short |
| 1998 | Stress | | Didier Delaître | short |
| 1999 | The Carriers Are Waiting | Overseer | Benoît Mariage | |
| 1999 | Prison à domicile | Bowling's owner | Christophe Jacrot | |
| 1999 | Tout tout près | Roland | Fabrice Maruca | short |
| 1999 | Suspendu | Youri | Alexis Charrier | short |
| 1999 | L'otage | | Pierre Vinour | short |
| 2000 | The Crimson Rivers | Man at Petrol Station | Mathieu Kassovitz | |
| 2000 | Marie, Nonna, la vierge et moi | Marcel | Francis Renaud | |
| 2000 | Sauve-moi | Motte | Christian Vincent | |
| 2000 | Sur un air d'autoroute | Milou | Thierry Boscheron | |
| 2000 | Virilité | Monsieur Max | Ronan Girre | |
| 2000 | Millevaches [Expérience] | The Man | Pierre Vinour | short |
| 2000 | Le distracteur | The Nr. 72 | Frédéric Chignac | short |
| 2000 | Bom! | The cop | Clément Subileau and David Tardé | short |
| 2000 | Les brigands | | Jérôme Le Maire | short |
| 2000 | Sans famille | Father Barberin | Jean-Daniel Verhaeghe | TV movie |
| 2000 | La crim' | Warin | Dennis Berry | TV series (1 episode) |
| 2001 | Brotherhood of the Wolf | Jean Chastel | Christophe Gans | |
| 2001 | The Château | Pierre | Jesse Peretz | |
| 2001 | Les aliénés | The boss | Yvan Gauthier | |
| 2001 | Les Siens | The father | Noël Mitrani | short |
| 2001 | Le regard de l'autre | Cazeneuve | Dominique Tabuteau | TV movie |
| 2002 | A Private Affair | Mathieu | Guillaume Nicloux | |
| 2002 | Irréversible | The Butcher | Gaspar Noé | |
| 2002 | The Code | Simon | Manuel Boursinhac | |
| 2002 | Âges ingrats | Robert | Cyril Gelblat | short |
| 2002 | L'ancien | The father | Nicky Naudé and Emmanuel Rodriguez | short |
| 2002 | Avocats & associés | Forlane's father | Christophe Lamotte | TV series (1 episode) |
| 2002 | P.J. | Pépé | Brigitte Coscas | TV series (1 episode) |
| 2003 | High Tension | The Killer | Alexandre Aja | |
| 2003 | L'enfant du pays | Charles | René Féret | |
| 2003 | À la petite semaine | Roger | Sam Karmann | |
| 2003 | Supernova [Expérience #1] | Simon Peyrelevade | Pierre Vinour | |
| 2003 | R.I.P. - Repose en paix | Fabre | Roland Collin | short |
| 2003 | Le beau Jacques | Alain | Elise Griffon and Sébastien Marnier | short |
| 2004 | Calvaire | Robert Orton | Fabrice Du Welz | |
| 2004 | Doo Wop | Michel | David Lanzmann | |
| 2004 | Le salopard | Fossart | Jean-Noël Betzler | short |
| 2004 | La quille | Raoul Lemarque | Jean-Jacques Lelté | short |
| 2004 | Transit | | Julien Leclercq | short |
| 2004 | Ressac | | Anne Flandrin | short |
| 2004 | P.J. | Beauchamps | Étienne Dhaene | TV series (1 episode) |
| 2004 | La crim' | Breton | Vincent Monnet | TV series (1 episode) |
| 2004 | Les Cordier, juge et flic | Max Chauffour | Jean-Marc Seban | TV series (1 episode) |
| 2005 | Virgil | Louis | Mabrouk El Mechri | |
| 2005 | Love Is in the Air | Ludo's father | Rémi Bezançon | |
| 2005 | Friday or Another Day | Philippe de Nohan | Yvan Le Moine | |
| 2005 | Ennemis publics | | Karim Abbou and Kader Ayd | |
| 2005 | Touché par la grâce | Bruce | Florent Schmidt | short |
| 2005 | D77 | The man | Paul Vallespi | short |
| 2005 | Sur la route | The driver | Benjamin Papin | short |
| 2005 | Joséphine, ange gardien | Léo | Jean-Marc Seban | TV series (1 episode) |
| 2005–2009 | Kaamelott | Goustan de Carmélide | Alexandre Astier | TV series (7 episodes) |
| 2006 | Morganez | Léon | David Tardé | short |
| 2006 | Aurore, une autre histoire | Lawyer Mouillac | Henri Kebabdjian | short |
| 2006 | Novice | Luigi | Alexis Charrier | short |
| 2007 | The Second Wind | Commissaire Fardiano | Alain Corneau | |
| 2007 | Vous êtes de la police ? | Francky Garcia | Romuald Beugnon | |
| 2007 | CowBoy | One eyed | Benoît Mariage | |
| 2007 | Michou d'Auber | The coffee maker | Thomas Gilou | |
| 2007 | Faits divers | Jacques | Bill Barluet | short |
| 2007 | Oeil pour oeil | Bowman's friend | Frederic Polizine | short |
| 2007 | Bloody Current Exchange | Vincent | Romain Basset | short |
| 2007 | Situation critique | Monsieur Cauchon | Guillaume Le Mezo and Boris Vassallo | short |
| 2007 | Noël 347 | The ideal grandfather | Michaël Bier and Alice De Vestele | short |
| 2007 | Dérives | | Bill Barluet | short |
| 2007 | Les prédateurs | Alfred Sirven | Lucas Belvaux | TV series (2 episodes) |
| 2008 | Eldorado | The collector | Bouli Lanners | |
| 2008 | The Last Deadly Mission | Charles Subra | Olivier Marchal | |
| 2008 | Dragon Hunters | Lord Arnold | Guillaume Ivernel and Arthur Qwak | |
| 2008 | Lady Blood | Commissaire Jo Laumier | Jean-Marc Vincent | |
| 2008 | La saison des orphelins | Fournier | David Tardé | |
| 2008 | Faux freres | Gaby | Jo Prestia | short |
| 2008 | Vieillesse ennemie | The Old Man | Marc Obin | short |
| 2008 | J'reviens | The boss | Rani | short |
| 2008 | Contre nature | The patriarch | Julien Despaux | short |
| 2008 | Saignant | The policeman | Jean-Noël Betzler | short |
| 2009 | Humains | Professor Schneider | Jacques-Olivier Molon and Pierre-Olivier Thevenin | |
| 2009 | Orpailleur | Zpapa | Marc Barrat | |
| 2009 | Lignes de front | Father François | Jean-Christophe Klotz | |
| 2010 | The Extraordinary Adventures of Adèle Blanc-Sec | Professor Ménard | Luc Besson | |
| 2010 | Mammuth | The director of the Hospital | Benoît Delépine and Gustave Kervern | |
| 2010 | Wandering Streams | Edmond | Pascal Rabaté | |
| 2010 | The Pack | Chinaski | Franck Richard | |
| 2010 | Cannibal | The father | Benjamin Viré | |
| 2010 | Kill Me Please | Monsieur Antoine | Olias Barco | |
| 2010 | Comme les cinq doigts de la main | Kazan | Alexandre Arcady | |
| 2010 | Belleville-Tokyo | Jean-Jacques | Élise Girard | |
| 2010 | Le temps de la kermesse est terminé | The truck driver | Frédéric Chignac | |
| 2010 | Gauche droite | Gauche | Stéphane Bouquet | short |
| 2010 | Sortir | Father | Nicolas Leborgne | short |
| 2010 | Vivre, jusqu'au bout... | René | Vincent Plaidy | short |
| 2010 | En chantier, monsieur Tanner ! | Tanner's father | Stefan Liberski | TV movie |
| 2010 | Je, François Villon, voleur, assassin, poète | Guillaume de Villon | Serge Meynard | TV movie |
| 2011 | War Horse | French Auctioneer | Steven Spielberg | |
| 2011 | Comme des héros | Monsieur Javeau | Véronique Jadin | short |
| 2011 | Entre Chien et Loup | The psy | Clayton Burkhart | short |
| 2011 | Une nuit dans Paris | Jacques | Anissa Bonnefont | short |
| 2011 | Les beaux mecs | Janvier | Gilles Bannier | TV mini-series |
| 2011 | Hard | Daniel | Cathy Verney | TV series (1 episode) |
| 2012 | In the Name of the Son | Father Taon | Vincent Lannoo | |
| 2012 | Karma Koma | Vlad | Aurélia Mengin | short |
| 2012 | Autopsy des Délices | The Killer | Aurélia Mengin | short |
| 2012 | Du poil de la bête | Louis | Sylvain Drecourt | short |
| 2012 | Le silence et l'oubli | Gaby | Christophe Delsaux | short |
| 2012 | Deux caves en sous-sol | Charles | Rémi Dumas | short |
| 2012 | No Limit | Victor Cerda | Julien Despaux | TV series (2 episodes) |
| 2012 | Mafiosa | Jules Acquaviva | Hugues Pagan and Pierre Leccia | TV series (5 episodes) |
| 2013 | The Informant | Glacose | Julien Leclercq | |
| 2013 | The Marchers | René Ledu | Nabil Ben Yadir | |
| 2013 | Une histoire d'amour | The minister | Hélène Fillières | |
| 2013 | Svolta | The vet | Cédric Deneubourg | |
| 2013 | Nos héros sont morts ce soir | Ferdinand | David Perrault | |
| 2013 | La storia di Cino | Gold digger | Carlo Alberto Pinelli | |
| 2013 | A.D.N., l'âme de la terre | Howard | Thierry Obadia | |
| 2013 | Là-haut | Luc | Bill Barluet | short |
| 2013 | Fais pas ci, fais pas ça | Gérard | Cathy Verney | TV series (1 episode) |
| 2014 | Colt 45 | Prefect Pradier | Fabrice Du Welz | |
| 2014 | Ablations | Wortz | Arnold de Parscau | |
| 2014 | Horsehead | Priest | Romain Basset | |
| 2014 | 14 Million Screams | The husband | Lisa Azuelos | short |
| 2014 | Le domaine des étriqués | Elfred Ewing | Arnold de Parscau | short |
| 2014 | La malédiction de Julia | Julien | Bruno Garcia | TV movie |
| 2014 | Caïn | Stefano | Benoît d'Aubert | TV series (1 episode) |
| 2014 | Origines | Josselin Seilhan de Beaurepaire | Jérôme Navarro | TV series (1 episode) |
| 2015 | Anton Tchékhov 1890 | Dmitry Grigorovich | René Féret | |
| 2015 | One Wild Moment | Antoine's neighbor | Jean-François Richet | |
| 2015 | Nothing Sacred | Otho | Dylan Bank and Morgan Pehme | |
| 2015 | Omaha Beach | The old man | Luc Martin | short |
| 2015 | Murders at Carcassonne | Father Ancel | Julien Despaux | TV movie |
| 2015 | Les Petits Meurtres d'Agatha Christie | Emile Deboucke | Marc Angelo | TV series (1 episode) |
| 2016 | Mon frère bien-aimé | Guy Fourvier | Denis Malleval | TV movie |
| 2016 | Le juge est une femme | Georges Tusseau | Jean-Christophe Delpias | TV series (1 episode) |
| 2016 | Chefs | Marcel | Arnaud Malherbe and Clovis Cornillac | TV series (3 episodes) |
| 2016 | À Jamais | André Munoz | Luc Murat | TV series (4 episodes) |
| 2017 | Moi et le Che | The photograph | Patrice Gautier | |
| 2017 | Contact | Charles Orsenna | Elsa Bennett and Hippolyte Dard | TV series (1 episode) |
| 2018 | Moi, maman, ma mère et moi | Jeff | Christophe Le Masne | |
| 2018 | Besoin Dead | Priest | Aurélien Digard | short |
| 2018 | Le corps des vieux | Jacques | Louise de Prémonville | short |
| 2018 | Le chat qui pleure | Uncle Daniel | Jean-Loup Felicioli and Alain Gagnol | short |
| 2019 | Fornacis | Fornacis Bar Owner | Aurélia Mengin | |

== Theatre ==
| Year | Title | Author | Director |
|---|---|---|---|
| 1969 | Trumpets and Drums | Bertolt Brecht | Jean-Pierre Vincent |
| 1970 | Cyrano de Bergerac | Edmond Rostand | Jean Deschamps |
| 1970 | King Lear | William Shakespeare | Pierre Debauche |
| 1970 | The Trojan War Will Not Take Place | Jean Giraudoux | Yves Kerboul |
| 1970 | The Sea Wall | Marguerite Duras | Georges Goubert |
| 1971 | Capitaine Schelle, Capitaine Eçço | Serge Rezvani | Jean-Pierre Vincent |
| 1972–73 | In the Jungle of Cities | Bertolt Brecht | André Engel, Jean Jourdheuil & Jean-Pierre Vincent |
| 1973 | Nom : Stuart, prénom : Marie | Jaromir Knittl | Jaromir Knittl |
| 1981–82 | Edward II | Christopher Marlowe | Bernard Sobel |
| 1988 | The Public | Federico García Lorca | Jorge Lavelli |
| 2015 | Dancing at Lughnasa | Brian Friel | Didier Long |
