= Clara Pacini =

French actress (born 2002)

- Pacini in 2026
- Born: 2002 (age 23–24)
- Education: Cours Florent; Conservatoire national supérieur d'art dramatique
- Occupation: Actress
- Years active: 2022–present

Clara Pacini (born 2002) is a French actress known for her role as Jeanne in The Ice Tower (2025), her feature film debut that marked her breakthrough.

== Early life and education ==
Clara Pacini was born in 2002 in France. She pursued formal acting education at the Cours Florent from 2020 to 2022, where she underwent dual training in both French and English. She then continued her studies at the Conservatoire national supérieur d'art dramatique (CNSAD) in Paris from 2022 to 2025.

== Career ==
Pacini started acting in short films. Her credits include Club Cauchemar (2024), a psychological thriller, and Il manque toujours quelque chose (surtout quand on ne sait pas quoi chercher) (2025), a dramatic exploration of the human condition.

=== Breakthrough in The Ice Tower (2025) ===
In 2025, Pacini made her feature film debut in The Ice Tower, a major international production directed by Lucile Hadžihalilović. She plays the role of Jeanne, which has been widely noted as her breakout performance. The film, co-starring Marion Cotillard, has been praised for its unique blend of drama and fantasy, and Pacini's portrayal has garnered significant attention from critics for its emotional depth and maturity.

In addition to her film work, Pacini has gained experience in theater. She is involved in several productions as part of her training at CNSAD, such as Et je me souviendrai toujours de cela (2024), directed by Claire Lasne Darcueil, Saudade (2025), directed by Sidonie Vilas Boas; Fragments de la forêt (2025), directed by Simon Falguières; Musée Duras (2025), directed by Julien Gosselin; and Quelques mots d’amour (2024), directed by Christophe Patty and Audrey Jean-Baptiste.

== Personal life ==
In addition to acting, Pacini plays the piano, and is a black belt in judo. She is bilingual in French and English and is also fluent in Spanish.

== Filmography ==
=== Feature films ===
Key
†	Denotes films that have not yet been released

Year	Title	Role	Director	Notes
2025	The Ice Tower	Jeanne	Lucile Hadžihalilović	
2026	One Minute to Midnight	Emma	Nicolas Pariser	

=== Short films ===
Year	Title	Role	Director	Ref.
2022	La Chaleur	Suzanne	Maïa Kerkour	
2024	Club Cauchemar		Merlin Dutertre	
2025	Il manque toujours quelque chose (surtout quand on ne sait pas quoi chercher)		Paul Rigoux	

=== Theatre ===
Year	Title	Role	Director	Ref.
2024	Et je me souviendrai toujours de cela		Claire Lasne Darcueil	
2024	Quelques mots d'amour		Christophe Patty and Audrey Jean-Baptiste	
2025	Musée Duras		Julien Gosselin	
2025	Fragments de la forêt		Simon Falguières	
2025	Saudade		Sidonie Vilas Boas	
