= Moucherotte =

Mountain in France

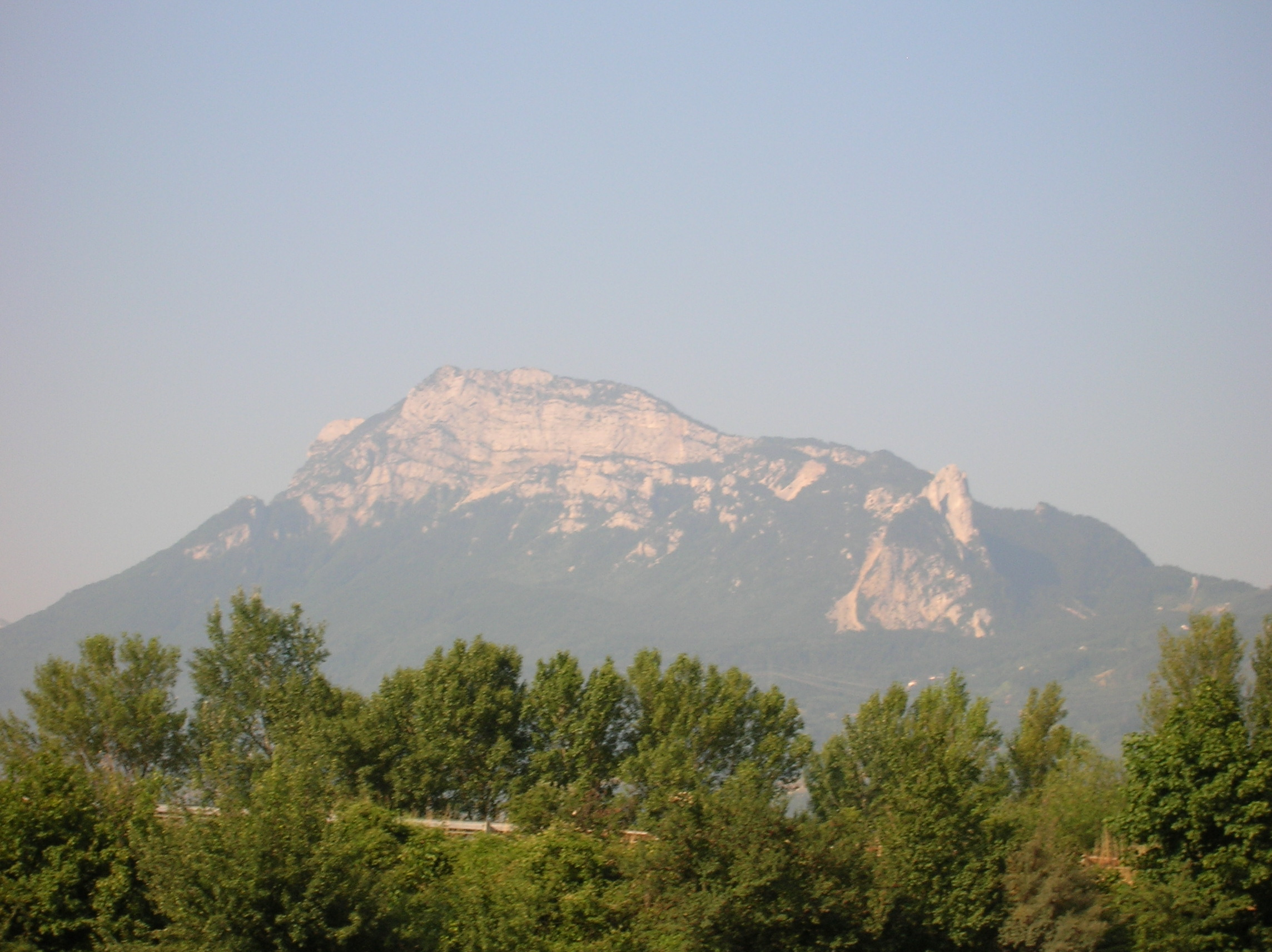
- Le Moucherotte from the village of Saint-Martin-le-Vinoux

Highest point
- Elevation: 1,901 m (6,237 ft)
- Coordinates: 45°08′52″N 05°38′21″E

Geography
- Location within France
- Location: Isère, Rhône-Alpes, France
- Parent range: Vercors Plateau

Climbing
- Easiest route: Hike

Le Moucherotte (1901 metres) is the easternmost peak of the Vercors Massif, and also the northern culmination of the long ridge that runs along the eastern edge of the Vercors high plateau, and overlooks the city of Grenoble. The mountain is divided between the communes of Saint-Nizier-du-Moucherotte, Lans-en-Vercors, Seyssins and Claix.

== Geology ==
Similar to the rest of the Vercors range, the Moucherotte is largely composed of limestone. At the foot of Moucherotte, (bottom right in photo) there are three rocks, known as the Three Maidens, which were used in the resistance during the second world war by the maquis of Saint-Nizier-of-Moucherotte.

The southern slopes and ridges of the Moucherotte extend to the Col de l'Arc, with three consecutive secondary peaks, called "la Croix des Ramées" (the Cross of Ramées), "du Grand Cheval" (the Great Horse, 1827 metres) and "du Pic Saint-Michel" (the peak of Saint Michael, 1966 metres).

The Moucherotte is home to a variety of fauna, including chamois, mountain sheep, and deer. The summit is covered in grass, and loosely wooded.

== Commercial use ==
There was once a cable car, built by the company Applevage, which connected the village of Saint-Nizier Moucherotte to the summit, where there was also a hotel, l'Ermitage (the Hermitage). Following first financial difficulties and then vandalism, the hotel closed permanently in the mid-1970s. The uniqueness and outstanding natural beauty of the location attracted the stars of the era, and it served as the setting for the filming of some scenes from the movie "La Bride sur le cou" (The Bride of the neck), with Brigitte Bardot; the lead actress stayed at the hotel longer than expected, as access was cut off due to a snowstorm. The stately hotel, abandoned and left in ruins, was finally demolished at the start of the twenty-first century to return the site to its original beauty. At the same time, the derelict gondola station was also demolished. Today, there is almost no trace of its past.

== Sporting history ==
During the 1968 Winter Olympics, the ski jumping competition was held on a 90-metre springboard, which is still in place on the northern foothills of the Moucherotte. However, it has seen no use since the late 1980s.

== Ascent ==
There are several conventional methods of ascent:

- From the village of Saint-Nizier-du-Moucherotte, either by the Grande Randonnee, or up past the old ski slope.
- From the bottom of the commune of Saint-Nizier-du-Moucherotte, possible routes are either through the vallon des Forges, or by the east face (the most direct and steepest ascent).
- From the Lans-en-Vercors winter-sports stadium, the easiest route utilises a wide track and has a relatively gentle gradient.
