= The Ice Tower =

2025 film by Lucile Hadžihalilović

- Theatrical release poster
- French: La Tour de glace
- Directed by: Lucile Hadžihalilović
- Written by: Lucile Hadžihalilović; Geoff Cox
- Produced by: Muriel Merlin; Ingmar Trost
- Starring: Marion Cotillard; Clara Pacini; August Diehl; Gaspar Noé
- Cinematography: Jonathan Ricquebourg
- Edited by: Nassim Gordji Tehrani
- Production companies: 3B Productions; Arte France Cinéma; Sutor Kolonko; Albolina Film; Davis Films
- Distributed by: Metropolitan Filmexport (France); Grandfilm (Germany)
- Release dates: 16 February 2025 (Berlinale); 17 September 2025 (France); 18 December 2025 (Germany)
- Running time: 118 minutes
- Countries: France; Germany; Italy
- Language: French
- Budget: €4.9 million
- Box office: $46,000

The Ice Tower (

French: La Tour de glace) is a 2025 fantasy drama film directed by Lucile Hadžihalilović from a screenplay she co-wrote with Geoff Cox. Set in the 1970s, it stars Marion Cotillard as an actress who is shooting a film adaptation of Hans Christian Andersen's fairy tale The Snow Queen, in which she plays the title character, and Clara Pacini as a runaway teenage orphan who becomes infatuated with the actress. The cast also includes August Diehl and Gaspar Noé in supporting roles. A co-production between France, Germany and Italy, the film had its world premiere at the 75th Berlin International Film Festival on 16 February 2025, where it won the Silver Bear for Outstanding Artistic Contribution.

The Ice Tower received generally positive reviews from critics. It was ranked number 18 on Sight and Sound's list of "50 best films of 2025", and it also won the awards for Best Film and Best Production Design at the 2025 Neuchâtel Fantastic Film Festival, and the Zabaltegi-Tabakalera Award at the 2025 San Sebastián Film Festival. It was released theatrically in France by Metropolitan Filmexport on 17 September 2025, and in Germany by Grandfilm on 18 December 2025.

== Plot ==
In the 1970s, the enigmatic actress Cristina is shooting a film adaptation of Hans Christian Andersen's fairy tale The Snow Queen, in which she plays the title character. At the same time, Jeanne, a runaway teenage orphan, takes refuge in the studio where the film is being shot and falls under Cristina's spell, and a mutual fascination grows between them.

== Cast ==
- Marion Cotillard as Cristina / The Snow Queen
- Clara Pacini as Jeanne / Bianca
- August Diehl as Max
- Gaspar Noé as Dino
- Marine Gesbert as Stéphanie
- Lilas-Rose Gilberti Poisot
- Dounia Sichov
- Raphael Reboul
- Wilhelm Bonnelle

== Production ==
=== Development ===
On 20 March 2017, Cineuropa reported that Lucile Hadžihalilović was finishing the screenplay for her next film, La Reine des Neiges (The Snow Queen), which had been selected by Groupe Ouest as one of the eight projects that would benefit from a writing coaching programme in Brittany that year. Hadžihalilović co-wrote the screenplay with Geoff Cox, with whom she had collaborated in Évolution (2015) and Earwig (2021).

On 22 June 2023, ARTE France announced that it would co-produce the film, now titled La Tour de glace (The Ice Tower) and starring Marion Cotillard, with Metropolitan Filmexport set to distribute it, and that shooting would take place in France and Germany between January and February 2024.

The film was co-produced by France's 3B Productions, Germany's Sutor Kolonko, and Italy's Albolina Film. The crew includes Jonathan Ricquebourg as the director of photography, Julia Irribarria as set designer, and costumes made by Laurence Benoit.

The word "glace" in the original French title (La Tour de glace) means both "ice" and "mirror". Cristina and Jeanne mirror each other throughout the film. Hadžihalilović told Filmmaker Magazine in February 2025:

It was clear from the script that what happens in the film-within-the-film is, in fact, a continuation of what happened to Jeanne in real life, on the set. Similarly, what happens between her and Cristina mirrors what happens in the film. It's the same story which is being told sometimes in reality, sometimes in the film-within-the-film, or maybe in Jeanne's dreams at some point. Maybe she's the one who created the film-within-the-film? Together with [cinematographer] Jonathan Ricquebourg we decided that The Snow Queen [the film they were shooting in the film], shouldn't look too differently from our film. So the link, or the frontier of reality, would be blurred with the help of very slight differences. But still, I knew that I was going to edit it as a mix between reality and film: for example, now we are looking at Jeanne looking at the set, etc. What I wanted was to blur the frontier so there is emotional continuity.

=== Casting ===
On 22 June 2023, ARTE France announced that Marion Cotillard would star in the film, marking her second collaboration with Hadžihalilović 20 years after starring in her feature directorial debut, Innocence (2004). Clara Pacini (in her first feature film), August Diehl, Gaspar Noé, Lilas-Rose Gilberti Poisot, Raphael Reboul, Wilhelm Bonnelle, Marine Gesbert and Dounia Sichov later joined the cast.

Hadžihalilović said she thought it would be funny to cast Noé, her longtime collaborator and real-life partner, as a director completely unlike himself. Noé's only condition to appear in the film was to wear a wig in it. He told Hadžihalilović that he would do the film for free if he could wear a wig.

=== Influences ===
Hadžihalilović told Variety about the film's inspirations: "We thought a lot about Víctor Erice's The Spirit of the Beehive (1973), which transfigures reality through the eyes of a youth. And we tried to do the same — embellishing and stylizing, experiencing this world through the young girl's eyes by making the mundane a bit more enchanted." The Snow Queen dress that fascinates Jeanne was inspired by the costumes in A Midsummer Night's Dream (1935).

On 2 October 2025, Hadžihalilović shared with Letterboxd a list of 10 films that inspired The Ice Tower with accompanying notes that read:

- Black Narcissus (1947) – "A captivating blend of studio-bound artificiality and breathtaking painted backdrops that evoke the vastness of the high mountains. The tension between the two women on the precipice still lingers in my mind, and the madness that can possess a woman in an icy mountain landscape."
- The Birds (1963) – "I've always been drawn to Hitchcock's women, and Melanie, played by Tippi Hedren, feels like a distant cousin to Marion Cotillard's character—beautiful, cold and distant, but with deep inner turmoil. And then, of course, there are the birds. Always threatening."
- Shanghai Express (1932) – "Marlene Dietrich was the spark behind Cristina. Her elegance, her mystery—it's all there. And von Sternberg's fetishistic attention to mise-en-scène left an impression on me."
- A Midsummer Night's Dream (1935) – "The exquisite artwork: scenery, costumes, lightning—every detail conjures an enchanted vision, a shimmering world that sparkles."
- Warning Shadows (1923) – "The haunting interplay between realism and expressionism, using chiaroscuro like a language of its own—between on-screen and off-screen space. The theme of the 'double' has never been more compelling, with the shadow-puppeteer's show mirroring the relationships between his guests."
- Beauty and the Beast (1978) – "There's something in the dark fairy-tale atmosphere, steeped in snow and dread. The framing, the lighting, the unsettling beauty—a blend of surreal and the real within a toxic atmosphere really captured my imagination."
- Daughters of Darkness (1971) – "Delphine Seyrig's elegance, her erotic vibes, and the vampire kiss really resonated with me—she embodies cinematic allure. The twilight hotel adrift in a desolate landscape, the deep nostalgia and loneliness… And for Kümel's view on cinema: "One can mistreat the subjects as much as they want, but not the cinema."
- Deep Red (1975) – "Torino becomes a character in itself—mysterious and terrifyingly beautiful with its empty streets and arcades. Its mix of fascist and gothic architecture, the empty and dilapidated palazzo was a big influence in creating our environment."
- Veronika Voss (1982) – "A woman unraveling—an actress lost to morphine and memory. The blend of realism and theatricality feels dreamlike. The film within a film, the enigmatic storytelling, and the striking nods to German Expressionism continue to intrigue me."
- All About Eve (1950) – "While not a conscious inspiration, the parallels with The Ice Tower are undeniable—the accomplished actress, the adoring young admirer. I've watched it a few times and loved it. Maybe it crept in subconsciously, shaping things without me even realizing."

=== Filming ===
Principal photography began in Paris on 7 January 2024, and wrapped in March 2024. Filming also took place in Yvelines between February and March 2024, and in the city of Bolzano in Northern Italy, between late February and late March 2024.

== Release ==
The Ice Tower had its world premiere at the 75th Berlin International Film Festival in official competition on 16 February 2025. The film was released theatrically in France by Metropolitan Filmexport on 17 September 2025. International sales are handled by Goodfellas. The film was shown in a special silent screening at the Brussels International Fantastic Film Festival on 17 April 2025.

On 18 February 2025, Yellow Veil Pictures acquired North American distribution rights to the film and released it theatrically in the United States on 3 October 2025. BFI Distribution released the film in the United Kingdom on 21 November 2025. Movies Inspired will release it in Italy and Bir Film will release it in Turkey. The film was released in Germany by Grandfilm on 18 December 2025.

The official poster and the official trailer for the film were released on 5 August 2025.

== Home media ==
The Ice Tower was released on digital download and video on demand in France by Metropolitan Filmexport on 18 December 2025. The DVD and the 4k Blu-ray featuring audio commentary by the filmmakers were released in France on 12 March 2026.

In the United Kingdom, the film was made available for streaming on BFI Player on 12 January 2026.

In the United States, the Blu-ray for the film was included on the box set The Worlds of Lucile Hadžihalilović, released by Severin Films on 30 June 2026, with bonus features such as an introduction by Hadžihalilović, interviews with Hadžihalilović and cinematographer Jonathan Ricquebourg, two Q&As at the IFC Center, and a video essay by Alexandra Heller-Nicholas. The film will be made available to stream on Shudder on 5 June 2026.

== Reception ==
=== Critical response ===
The Ice Tower received generally positive reviews from critics. The film holds a 81% "Certified Fresh" score on review aggregator Rotten Tomatoes, based on 69 reviews with an average rating of 7.5/10. The site's "critics consensus" reads: "Gorgeous as frost and just as brittle, The Ice Tower occasionally wobbles as a narrative but largely excels as an atmospheric meditation on the creative process." On Metacritic, the film has a weighted average score of 80 out of 100 based on reviews from 17 critics, indicating "generally favorable reviews". AlloCiné, a French cinema site, gave the film an average rating of 3.5/5, based on a survey of 24 French reviews.

Peter Bradshaw of The Guardian gave the film 5 stars and wrote: "an eerie and unwholesome spell is cast in this film; it is a fairytale of death-wish yearning and erotic submission. It wittily fuses the real and the fictional into a trance-state – and that's the state that I've sometimes found a little static in previous films by Lucile Hadžihalilović, but not here. Dreamily strange it might be (and in fact, on the face of it, entirely preposterous) this movie had me gripped with its two outstanding lead performances – from Marion Cotillard and newcomer Clara Pacini – and a clamorous musical score." Bradshaw added about Gaspar Noé's character: "Cristina's somewhat louche director Dino, played by cameo by Hadzihalilovic's partner Gaspar Noé, is in the habit of telling likely young actresses that he might cast them in his next project, a Hitchcockian thriller. In fact, there is something Hitchcockian in this shoot, with an attack carried out by a bird, and in Cristina's own cold, cruel detachment from the victim's suffering. Hadzihalilovic might intend us to notice in one shot a movie poster for The Red Shoes, but the Powell/Pressburger film that this more resembles is surely Black Narcissus with its female desire and delirium in the bitter mountain cold."

Jordan Mintzer of The Hollywood Reporter called it "an artsy fable for adults", "a twisted retro fairytale that sits somewhere between Frozen (2013) and Mulholland Drive (2001)", and added: "As the film-within-a-film's famous star, Cotillard doesn't need to say much to make her presence felt. Shot in soft light like the Chanel fashion icon she now is, the actress emits a Garbo or Dietrich-like aura, terrifying those around her — especially the young extras forced to play in her scenes — with temper tantrums that are quelled, it seems, by heroin or some other drug that a doctor (August Diehl) administers to her between takes."

Jennie Kermode of Eye for Film wrote: "Cotillard is at her very best as a character we see only from the sidelines – earthy and opinionated in flashes, yet frozen by her art."

Elisa Guimarães of Collider wrote: "With a pacing that is more on the slower side and that, thus, might scare off some viewers, The Ice Tower is nevertheless a potent picture about coming of age in a world that isn't necessarily kind to us or our fantasies." Guimarães also praised Jonathan Ricquebourg's cinematography: "every single shot of The Ice Tower looks like a painting, or, rather, like an illustration from a very modern fairy tale book. Combining grainy images with a soft focus, Ricquebourg not only makes the movie seem like a product of the time in which it takes place—the late 60s—but also makes everything feel like a dream."

Isaac Feldberg of RogerEbert.com gave the film 4 stars and wrote: "Femininity exerts a powerfully unsettling pull in the work of Lucile Hadžihalilović, a French auteur who's never made a film of such coruscating, crystalline beauty as "The Ice Tower," a hypnotic meditation on the enchantment that develops between an impressionable teenage runaway and the imperious film actress whose set she stumbles first onto, then into. [...] Hadžihalilović suffuses this story with a languid menace, as if inducing hypnagogic near-slumber and still holding us under, even as the oxygen starts to run thin and what materializes from the ether begins to scare us." Feldberg also praised the film's leading actresses, saying: "it's a testament to the vividly expressive performance of newcomer Pacini—as well as a master class by Cotillard, whose immortal movie-star allure is charged here with almost vampiric malevolence at points—that "The Ice Tower" sustains its trance-like melodrama across a rigorously slow-burning 118 minutes."

=== Industry reception ===
Mexican film director Guillermo del Toro praised The Ice Tower calling it a "tremendous film".

=== Accolades ===
The Ice Tower was ranked number 18 on Sight and Sound's list of the "50 best films of 2025".

Award / Film Festival	Date of ceremony	Category	Recipient(s)	Result	Ref.
Berlin International Film Festival	22 February 2025	Golden Bear	Lucile Hadžihalilović	Nominated	
Berlin International Film Festival	22 February 2025	Silver Bear for Outstanding Artistic Contribution	Lucile Hadžihalilović and the creative ensemble	Won	
Brussels International Fantastic Film Festival	20 April 2025	White Raven	Lucile Hadžihalilović	Nominated	
Neuchâtel International Fantastic Film Festival	12 July 2025	H.R. Giger "Narcisse" Award - Best Film	Lucile Hadžihalilović	Won	
Neuchâtel International Fantastic Film Festival	12 July 2025	Imaging the Future Award - Best Production Design	Lucile Hadžihalilović	Won	
San Sebastián International Film Festival	27 September 2025	Zabaltegi-Tabakalera Award	Lucile Hadžihalilović	Won	
Imagine Film Festival	9 November 2025	Méliès d'Argent Award	Lucile Hadžihalilović	Nominated	
