= Humains =

- Official teaser poster
- Directed by: Pierre-Olivier Thévenin; Jacques-Olivier Molon
- Written by: Jean-Armand Bougrelle; Frédérique Henri; Dominique Néraud; Silvan Boris Schmid
- Produced by: Vérane Frédiani; Franck Ribière; Ruth Waldburger
- Starring: Philippe Nahon; Sara Forestier; Dominique Pinon
- Cinematography: Aleksander Kaufmann
- Edited by: Manuel De Sousa
- Music by: Gast Waltzing
- Production company: La Fabrique 2
- Distributed by: La Fabrique de Films; Films Distribution
- Release date: 6 February 2009
- Running time: 90 minutes
- Countries: France; Switzerland; Luxembourg
- Language: French

Humains is a 2009 French horror film directed from Pierre-Olivier Thévenin and Jacques-Olivier Molon. The film stars Sara Forestier, Dominique Pinon and Philippe Nahon.

== Plot ==
A French research team travels to the Swiss Alps to investigate a discovery. After a car accident, the group becomes lost in the mountains with a group of tourists and struggle to survive while being hunted by mysterious figures.

== Cast ==
- Lorànt Deutsch as Thomas
- Sara Forestier as Nadia
- Dominique Pinon as Gildas
- Philippe Nahon as Professor Schneider
- Manon Tournier as Elodie
- Élise Otzenberger as Patricia
- Christian Kmiotek as Paulo

== Production ==
The film was shot in late 2008 in Luxembourg, Paris and the Swiss Alps under the working title of "Les Disparus de Lötschental". Yolande Moreau was originally cast in the lead role as the character Charlotte, but she left the project. As a result, the character's role was changed and became Sara Forestier's character, Nadia.

== Release ==
The film premiered on 6 February 2009 as part of the European Film Market in Germany and was part of the Brussels International Fantastic Film Festival on 11 April 2009. The French cinema release was on 22 April 2009.

== Reception ==
The film grossed only $236,617 in its opening week in France and was universally panned by critics. It is the only film to be reviewed on Nanarland.com in its first week.

== Soundtrack ==
The score was composed by Luxembourg cinema composer Gast Waltzing.
