= La Bouche de Jean-Pierre =

1996 film

- Directed by: Lucile Hadžihalilović
- Written by: Lucile Hadžihalilović
- Produced by: Gaspar Noé
- Starring: Denise Aron-Schropfer
- Cinematography: Dominique Colin
- Edited by: Lucile Hadžihalilović
- Music by: Loic Da Silva; Philippe Mallier; John Milko; François Roy
- Distributed by: Rézo Films
- Release dates: May 1996 (Cannes); 9 April 1997 (France)
- Running time: 52 minutes
- Country: France
- Language: French

La Bouche de Jean-Pierre is a 1996 French drama film directed by Lucile Hadžihalilović. It was screened in the Un Certain Regard section at the 1996 Cannes Film Festival.

== Plot ==
Mimi is a little girl whose mother tries to commit suicide. Her aunt then takes her in. But Mimi is affected by the arrival of Jean-Pierre, her aunt's fiancé, to the point of losing sleep.

== Cast ==
- Denise Aron-Schropfer as Solange
- Sandra Sammartino as Mimi
- Michel Trillot as Jean-Pierre

== Production ==
In reference to the living room scene, Sandra Sammartino said,"No one has ever spoken to me brutally saying 'this is a touching scene, you are facing a pedophile, it will be hard'! That's why I had no apprehension, some embarrassment to be sure but for me it was all just a game !! I had a lot of fun on the set and I got along very well with Michel, I was able to distinguish between him and Jean Pierre... But I remember thinking to myself, 'This Jean Pierre is really stupid, why he does that ? !' Because in my young mind this kind of character did not exist in reality. Surely I would have had more trouble if I had been old enough to understand what I was shooting."
