= Hôtel de Ville, Fontaine, Isère =

Town hall in Fontaine, Isère, France

Hôtel de Ville
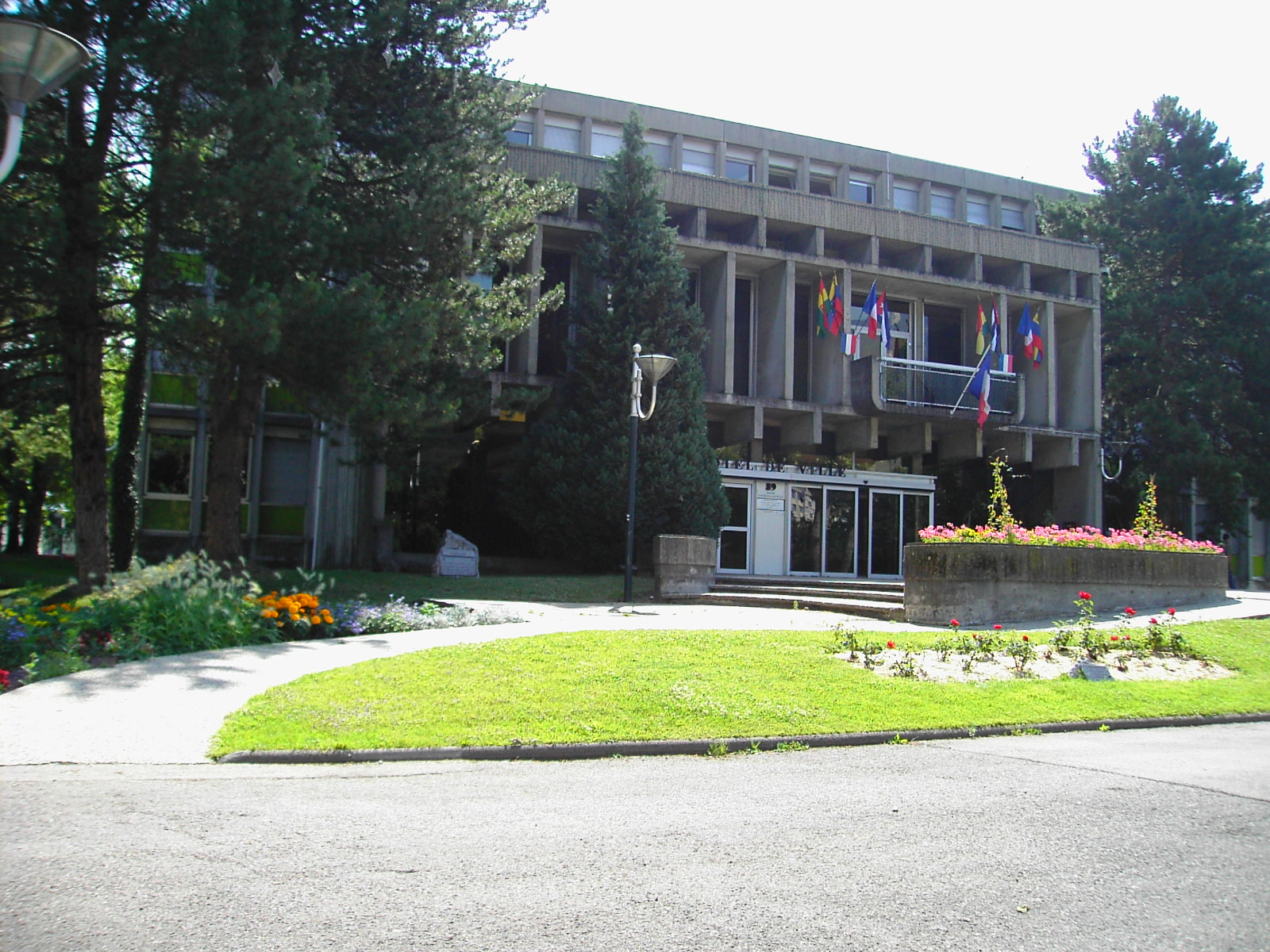
- The main frontage of the Hôtel de Ville in July 2008
- Interactive map of the Hôtel de Ville area

General information
- Type: City hall
- Architectural style: Modern style
- Location: Fontaine, France
- Coordinates: 45.1918°N 5.6882°E
- Completed: 1972

The Hôtel de Ville (French pronunciation: [otɛl də vil], City Hall) is a municipal building in Fontaine, Isère, in southeastern France, standing on Mail Marcel Cachin.

== History ==
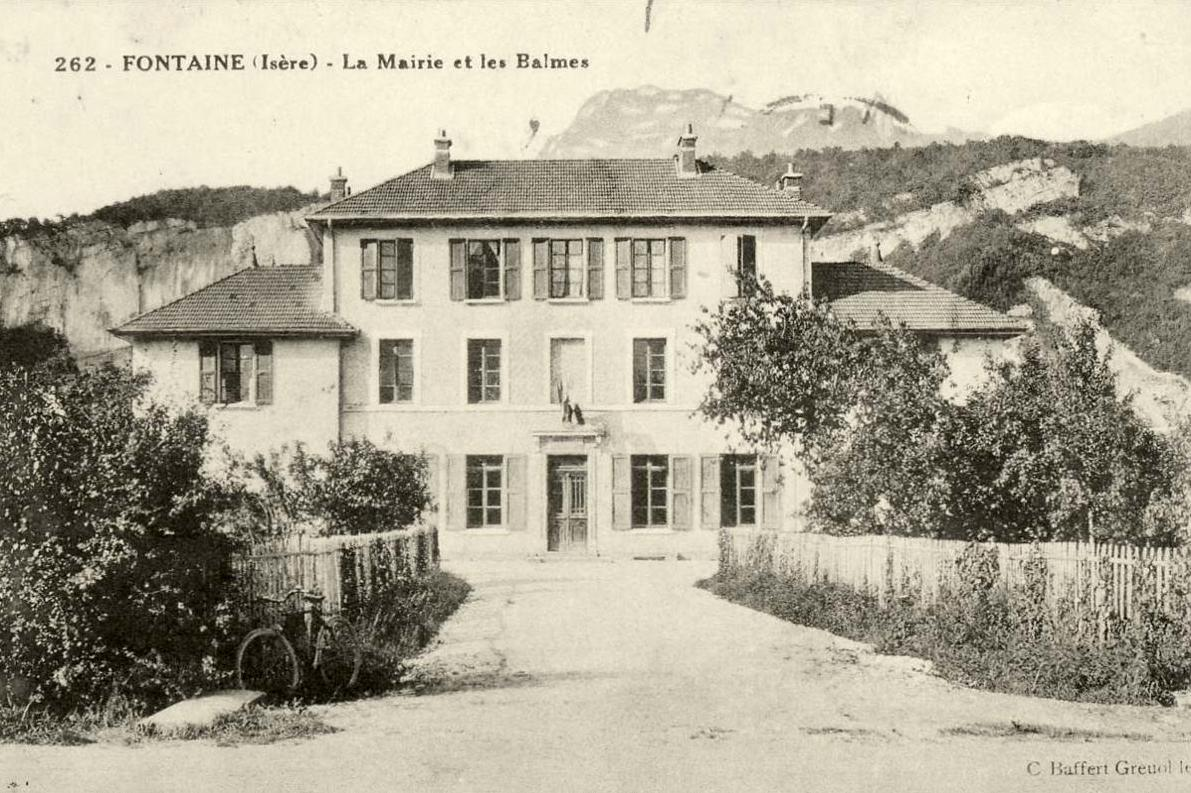
The old town hall

Follow the French Revolution, the new town council initially met at the house of the mayor at the time. At the end of the 19th century, following significant population growth largely associated with the tanneries and glove-making industries, the council decided to establish a dedicated town hall. The site they selected was on Place Henri Chapays. The town hall stood in front of Les Balmes, a distinctive formation of cliffs.

The building was designed in the neoclassical style and built in brick with a cement render finish. The design involved a symmetrical main frontage of seven bays facing onto Avenue Amboise Croizat. It was laid out as a three-storey main block of five bays and a pair of two-storey wings of one bay each. The central bay featured a square-headed doorway with a cornice. The rest of the building was fenestrated by casement windows with stone surrounds and shutters. After the building was no longer required for municipal purposes, it accommodated a primary school, later known as École Primaire La Mairie.

After the Second World War, a war memorial which was intended to commemorate the lives of local service personnel who had died in the war, was erected behind the town hall, in the cemetery on the opposite side of Boulevard Paul Langevin.

In the late 1960s, following further population growth, the council led by the mayor, Louis Maisonnat, decided to commission a more substantial town hall. The site they selected was on Mail Marcel Cachin, approximately 1 kilometre (0.62 mi) to the southeast along Avenue Amboise Croizat. The new building was designed in the modern style, built in concrete and glass and was officially opened by the junior general secretary of the French Communist Party, Georges Marchais, in 1972.

The design involved an asymmetrical main frontage of 27 bays facing onto Mail Marcel Cachin. The left-hand section of 16 bays featured a series of glass doors on the ground floor, a series of recessed, double-height, casement windows separated by concrete piers on the first floor, and a series of smaller casement windows at attic level. The right-hand section of 11 bays was fenestrated on a more regular basis by casement windows on four floors. Internally, the principal room was the Salle du Conseil (council chamber) on the first floor.

A triangular green area, known as the Parc André Malraux, was subsequently created in front of the town hall. It was intended to act as a venue for wedding photos for marriages which had taken place in the town hall, and to host music festivals and other public events. The park was named to commemorate the life of the former minister of culture, André Malraux, who survived an assassination attempt while in office.
