= Jacques Krier =

French film director and writer

- Born: February 6, 1926; Nancy, France
- Died: August 24, 2008 (aged 82); Digne-les-Bains, France
- Education: University of Nancy; University of Paris; Institut des hautes études cinématographiques
- Occupations: Television producer and director, novelist
- Political party: French Communist Party

Jacques Krier (February 6, 1926 - August 24, 2008) was a French television film producer and director. A communist, he directed many mini-series of television documentaries about the living conditions of French workers, including janitors, as well as Arabs in French Algeria and immigrants from Mali. He also directed films for television and documentaries for the General Confederation of Labour, a labor union. He was the author of several novels and the winner of the 2000 Prix Roger Vailland.

== Early life ==
Jacques Krier was born on February 6, 1926, in Nancy, France. His parents were storekeepers.

Krier co-founded the ciné-club de Nancy with Jean L'Hôte in his hometown as a teenager. He graduated from the University of Nancy with a Bachelor of Laws and the University of Paris with a bachelor of arts degree in philosophy. He subsequently attended film school at the Institut des hautes études cinématographiques, later known as La Fémis. Meanwhile, he joined the French Communist Party. Moreover, with Stellio Lorenzi, he was the co-founder of the Syndicat français des réalisateurs de Télévision, a subgroup of the General Confederation of Labour (CGT), a labor union in France.

== Career ==
Krier started his career in television because the 1946 Blum–Byrnes agreement made it difficult for communists to work in cinema. He joined the Radiodiffusion-Télévision Française in 1953, where he first worked as an assistant to Maurice Failevic. He later worked on the newscast.

Krier began directing documentaries in 1957 alongside Jean-Claude Bergeret with A la découverte des Français, a television series of 14 mini-documentaries about the everyday lives of French miners, fishermen, teachers, etc. He directed Cinq colonnes à la une, another television series, from 1959 to 1968. Some of it showed scenes of Arab villages in French Algeria. With Pierre Tchernia, he directed 40 000 voisins, a 1960 documentary about the new HLMs built in Sarcelles. In 1964, he directed Ouvriers noirs de Paris, a documentary about Malian immigrants in Paris, with scenes shot in their home country. He also directed Mémoires d’un vieux quartier, a 1965 documentary about Ménilmontant with Gérard Chouchan. After a two-year hiatus, he directed Les femmes aussi for television in 1970. He subsequently directed Les Matinales – Paris de 5 à 7, a television series of mini-documentaries about the living conditions of janitors.

Krier directed television films. For example, he directed Un matin à Glisolles in 1962; it was about a young couple who run away without their parents's consent to be together. Meanwhile, he directed documentaries for the CGT.

Krier was the author of several novels and plays. His 2000 novel, L’Idéale, won the Prix Roger Vailland.

== Death ==
Krier died on August 24, 2008, in Digne-les-Bains. On his death, journalist Marcel Trillat said he was "a pioneer of what we came to know as the social-poetical documentary". His papers and films are held at the Institut national de l'audiovisuel.

== Works ==
- Krier, Jacques (1979). La Jeanne d'Arc est rouillée : les enfants de Lorraine ... et les choses de la vie : document. Paris: Ramsay. ISBN 9782859561277. OCLC 6666921.
- Krier, Jacques (1991). Coup de jeunes : récit d'enquête. Paris: Messidor. ISBN 9782209064861. OCLC 463565677.
- Krier, Jacques (1998). Monsieur, ça vous embête de nous parler de votre travail? : Carvin à livres ouverts. Pantin: Le Temps des cerises. ISBN 9782841090884. OCLC 467962695.
- Krier, Jacques (2000). L'idéale. Pantin: Le Temps Des Cerises. ISBN 2841092364.
- Krier, Jacques (2005). Les drôles de voyages d'un camarade errant. Pantin: Le Temps des Cerises. ISBN 9782841095414. OCLC 470211541.
