= Canton of Fontaine-Seyssinet =

Coordinates: 45.19°N 5.69°E

The canton of Fontaine-Seyssinet is an administrative division of the Isère department, eastern France. Its borders were modified at the French canton reorganisation which came into effect in March 2015. Its seat is in Fontaine.

It consists of the following communes:

1. Claix
2. Fontaine (partly)
3. Seyssinet-Pariset
4. Seyssins
