= A la découverte des Français =

Documentary series

- Genre: Documentary
- Country of origin: France
- Original language: French

Production
- Camera setup: Multi-camera
- Running time: 55 minutes

Original release
- Network: RTF
- Release: 5 April 1957 – 11 May 1960

A la découverte des Français is a documentary series directed by Jean-Claude Bergeret with Jacques Krier, hosted by Étienne Lalou, broadcast from April 5, 1957 to May 11, 1960 on RTF Television. The show was a 14 episode which covered everyday French lives of Fisherman and miners etc.
