= One Minute to Midnight =

2026 French film by Nicolas Pariser

- French: Un peu avant minuit
- Directed by: Nicolas Pariser
- Written by: Nicolas Pariser
- Produced by: Emmanuel Agneray
- Starring: Melvil Poupaud; Chiara Mastroianni; Golshifteh Farahani; Léonie Simaga
- Cinematography: Julia Mingo
- Edited by: Christel Dewynter
- Music by: Benjamin Esdraffo
- Production companies: Bibizi; Dimanche Soir
- Distributed by: Pyramide Distribution
- Release dates: 10 September 2026 (Venice); 25 November 2026
- Running time: 117 minutes
- Country: France
- Language: French

One Minute to Midnight (French: Un peu avant minuit, lit. 'A Bit Before Midnight') is a 2026 French drama film written and directed by Nicolas Pariser. It stars Melvil Poupaud, Chiara Mastroianni, Golshifteh Farahani, and Léonie Simaga.

The film had its world premiere in the main competition of the 83rd Venice International Film Festival on 10 September 2026, where it competed for the Golden Lion. It will be theatrically released in France by Pyramide Distribution on 25 November.

== Plot ==
In eastern France, 49-year-old Léo is preparing to separate from his partner when he learns that the biological father he never knew has died. Ahead of his trip to Italy to manage the inheritance, he spends time in Paris connecting with his activist daughter and reevaluating his life and relationships with women.

== Cast ==
- Melvil Poupaud as Léo
- Chiara Mastroianni as
- Golshifteh Farahani as Tina
- Léonie Simaga as Eléonore
- Clara Pacini as Emma
- Anaïs Demoustier as Armelle
- Micha Lescot as François

== Production ==
One Minute to Midnight was shot in Paris and Ferrara; filming began in late September 2025 and wrapped that November. The film was produced by Bibizi and Dimanche Soir with financial support from Sofica Indéfilms, Cofinova and La Banque Postale Image, and the Emilia-Romagna fund.

Clara Pacini, Léonie Simaga, Nicolas Pariser, Chiara Mastroianni and Melvil Poupaud at the 83rd Venice International Film Festival

== Release ==
One Minute to Midnight premiered on 10 September 2026, in competition for the Golden Lion at the 83rd Venice International Film Festival. It will be theatrically released in France by Pyramide Distribution on 25 November.

== Reception ==
The Hollywood Reporter's Jordan Mintzer called the film "charming, melancholic and Parisian to a fault". Miriam Bale from IndieWire criticized the film as being too talkative, up to the point it "could have been an article, or perhaps a play." Fabien Lemercier from Cineuropa described it as "an existentialist feature film about the passage of time, which is awash with modern-day issues and Joseph Roth undertones, and whose unusual style exerts a powerful force."

Marco Paiano of Lost Cinema said, "One Minute to Midnight is great cinema, yet it also looks to the present, analyzing its chaos and contradictions amid lost loves, social criticism, and countless regrets." and rated the film 8 out of 10 stars. Simon Eberhard writing for Outnow rated the film 3 out of 6 stars.
