= I Stand Alone (film) =

1998 film by Gaspar Noé

Stand Alone
- Theatrical release poster
- French: Seul contre tous
- Directed by: Gaspar Noé
- Written by: Gaspar Noé
- Produced by: Lucile Hadžihalilović; Gaspar Noé
- Starring: Philippe Nahon; Blandine Lenoir; Frankie Pain; Martine Audrain
- Cinematography: Dominique Colin
- Edited by: Lucile Hadžihalilović; Gaspar Noé
- Production companies: Canal+; Les Cinémas de la Zone; Love Streams Productions; Procirep
- Distributed by: Rézo Films
- Release dates: 16 May 1998 (Cannes); 17 February 1999 (France)
- Running time: 92 minutes
- Country: France
- Language: French
- Box office: $54,735

I Stand Alone (French: Seul contre tous, lit. 'Alone Against Everyone') is a 1998 French psychological drama art film written, directed, co-produced, and co-edited by Gaspar Noé in his feature-length directorial debut. It stars Philippe Nahon, Blandine Lenoir, Frankye Pain, and Martine Audrain. A sequel to Noé's short film Carne (1991), it depicts several pivotal days in the life of a butcher facing abandonment, isolation, rejection, and unemployment, It premiered at Cannes Film Festival in 1998 and received favourable reviews from critics.

== Plot ==
The film opens with a monologue on how morality and justice favor the rich, so that the poor have to enforce their own justice.

A slideshow commences, depicting the Butcher's life, narrated by himself. He explains that he is just a banal commoner: born near Paris in 1939, he was orphaned at two years old. At the end of World War II, he learns that his father was a French Communist who was killed in a concentration camp. He starts to become depressed and is sexually abused by a priest. At 14, he aspires to become a butcher and works odd jobs for a decade so he may own a horsemeat market. He succeeds at 30, setting up shop in Aubervilliers. He fathers a child with a worker, who wants nothing to do with a child, and ends up abandoning them. His daughter suffers from mutism.

As she hits puberty, he admits to incestuous ideation, but does not take action. She has her first period; out of shock, he believes she has been raped after a neighbor saw her with a worker. He hunts down the worker and stabs him in the face, leading to his arrest and his daughter's institutionalization. He is evicted from his shop and flat. Out of desperation, he becomes a barman and impregnates the owner of the bar. She offers to sell her bar to start from scratch in Lille, planning to open a meat market with the proceeds. He says a final farewell to his daughter and departs. They live with her mother, as they find apartments and market space. The Butcher attempts to forget his past, as well as his daughter – to start anew.

There, however, she uses her wealth against him and breaks their promise, which forces him to take up a job as a night watchman at a nursing home. During his job, he meets a young and caring nurse who is the complete opposite of his old, icy mistress. After he and the nurse witness the death of an elderly patient, the Butcher thinks back about the lack of affection throughout his life, from the orphanage to a life with an uncaring mistress who abuses the power she has over him because of her money. When his mistress unjustly accuses him of having an affair with the nurse, he snaps and punches her in the belly several times, likely killing their unborn child, then flees the scene with a pistol.

He decides to return to Paris, where he rents the same flophouse room where he conceived his daughter, and begins looking for a job as a horse meat butcher. Unfortunately, due to the changing tastes of customers during his time in prison, the market for horse meat has collapsed. Despite his patience, his job interviews consistently end in rejection. He broadens his job search but is considered unskilled in terms of general butchery, forcing him to start over again at the very bottom.

He starts looking outside his field, but the more he broadens his searches, the more desperate he becomes, and the more humiliating the job interviews become. When he turns to his old friends for advice, they also reject him. After being turned away at a slaughterhouse that once did business with his shop, the Butcher decides to kill the slaughterhouse manager. He plots the murder at a local tavern but is ejected from the bar at gunpoint after squabbling with the owner's son. The Butcher finds that he has only three bullets in his gun and begins assigning them to the men he feels have humiliated him the most.

Before he can take revenge, the Butcher decides to look for the only person he feels has ever loved him: his daughter. After meeting her at the asylum in which she is a patient, he takes her back to his room where he fantasizes about molesting her, killing her, and committing suicide. Then he decides to put his gun away, resolving to be good, and tearfully embraces his daughter. Again, however, he starts to contemplate having sex with her in the same manner he did with her mother.

Standing at a window, he unzips his daughter's jacket and begins fondling her. As he abuses his daughter, the Butcher, between more and more incoherent thoughts, tries to justify his act by asserting that the world does not condemn his love because it is evil, but because it is too powerful.

== Cast ==
- Philippe Nahon as the Butcher
- Blandine Lenoir as his daughter, Cynthia
- Frankie Pain as his Mistress
- Martine Audrain as his Mother-in-Law
- Roland Guéridon as his Old Friend
- Aïssa Djabri as Dr. Choukroun
- Gérard Ortega as the Bar Owner
- Alain Pierre as the Owner's Son
- Zaven as the Man with Morality

== Production ==
The film was produced by Les Cinémas de la Zone, a production company run by director Noé and his girlfriend Lucile Hadžihalilović. It was shot in an unusual combination of 16 mm film and the CinemaScope format. Recording took place sporadically over a period of two and a half years, with frequent budget problems. The fashion designer agnès b. eventually granted a loan which Noé says saved his production company. The gimmick of having a warning text before the story's climax was borrowed from William Castle's 1961 film Homicidal.

According to a 2010 interview, Noé came up with the idea of the butcher character following a conversation he had with his father as a teenager. The Argentinian-born Noé was traveling to his mother's native France for the first time, and upon landing in Paris, his father turned to him and said: "They eat horses here" (referring to the French consumption of horse meat, which is unheard of in Argentina). Noé then decided that a horse meat butcher would make a great character in a film, and this formed the basis for his first short Carne.

== Style ==
Most of the film's script consists of the Butcher's internal monologue, spoken in voice-over.

The camera is usually stationary throughout the film, but this trend is sometimes contrasted by abrupt, rapid movements. The sudden movements are always accompanied by a loud sound effect, usually an explosive gunshot. A notable exception is the final crane shot, which moves gently away from the Butcher's window and turns to look down an empty street.

The film frequently cuts to title cards that display a variety of messages. The cards often repeat a notable word spoken by the Butcher, such as "Morality" and "Justice". At the film's climax, a "Warning" title card counts down 30 seconds, gives viewers an opportunity to stop watching and avoid the remainder of the film.

== Reception ==
The film was favourably received by film critics, on Rotten Tomatoes the film has an approval rating of 88% with an average rating of 7.70/10 out of 24 critics.

On Metacritic the film has a score of 77 out of 100 based on 15 critics.

Writing for Entertainment Weekly film critic Owen Gleiberman gave the film a favourable review saying “The power of I Stand Alone lies in the way that the butcher's everything-sucks ferocity masks, and ultimately reveals, his despair. The movie blisters with the scalding poignance of a man trying — and failing — to surgically remove his own heart.” giving it a score of B+.

== Film connections ==
The film is a sequel to Noé's short film Carne. The Butcher also makes a cameo appearance at the beginning of Irréversible, Noe's follow-up to I Stand Alone. In a drunken monologue, the Butcher reveals that he was arrested for molesting his daughter.

== Accolades ==
- International Critics' Week Award at the 1998 Cannes Film Festival
- Official Selection of Telluride, Toronto, New York, Rotterdam, San Francisco, Sundance film festivals.
- Selected as a favourite film by John Waters to present as his annual selection within Maryland Film Festival 2003.
