= Carne (1991 film) =

1991 film by Gaspar Noé

- Directed by: Gaspar Noé
- Written by: Gaspar Noé
- Starring: Philippe Nahon; Blandine Lenoir
- Cinematography: Dominique Colin
- Edited by: Lucile Hadžihalilović
- Production company: Les Cinémas de la Zone
- Distributed by: Action Gitanes
- Release dates: May 1991 (Cannes); 17 June 1992
- Running time: 38 minutes
- Country: France
- Language: French

Carne is a 1991 French drama short film written and directed by Gaspar Noé, starring Philippe Nahon and Blandine Lenoir. It tells the story of a horse butcher with a mute daughter. At a running time of 38 minutes, it was the first longer film directed by Noé. The narrative was continued in Noé's 1998 full-length debut, I Stand Alone.

== Plot ==
A nameless horse butcher, whose wife left him soon after their mute daughter was born, operates his own business while trying to raise the daughter. Despite the fact that she has become a teenager, the Butcher continues to wash her like a baby, and struggles to resist the temptation of committing incest.

On the day of the daughter's first menstruation, the Butcher misinterprets the situation and assumes that she's been raped by a worker, whom he immediately seeks out. However, this only leads to him stabbing an innocent worker in the mouth and crippling him. The Butcher is imprisoned for the assault and forced to sell not only his shop but also his apartment.

Even after he's released from prison (having been traumatized by his sexual relations with his cellmate, Gerard) the Butcher is unable to meet his daughter, who's ended up in a mental hospital, and is forced to work for a woman who runs a cafeteria.

He and the cafeteria owner end up in a relationship, which he comes to hate, and she ends up pregnant. He finally meets his daughter in the mental hospital but leaves, frustrated with his life and how it has turned out.

== Cast ==
- Philippe Nahon as The Butcher
- Blandine Lenoir as The Butcher's Daughter
- Frankye Pain as The Butcher's Mistress
- Hélène Testud as The Maid

== Production ==
The film was produced through Gaspar Noé and his girlfriend Lucile Hadžihalilović's company Les Cinémas de la Zone. It was shot in 16 mm CinemaScope which was blown up to 35 mm. An instrumental version of the song "Ahwak", composed by the 20th-century Egyptian singer and composer Mohammed Abdel Wahab and originally sung by the Egyptian singer and actor Abdel Halim Hafez, plays when the halal butchery is first shown in the film.

Blandine Lenoir said she was 15 at the time of filming.

== Release ==
The film premiered in the short film section of the 1991 International Critics' Week in Cannes. It won the top prize in its section, as well as the Georges Sadoul Prize and the Prix Très Special. Carne was eventually given a theatrical release in France and started a trend of theatrical distribution for films with similar length.

== References in other media ==
Johnny Weeks describes the beginning of the film Carne in "Hard Cases", the fourth episode of the second season of the TV series The Wire.
