= Seyssinet-Pariset =

- Commune
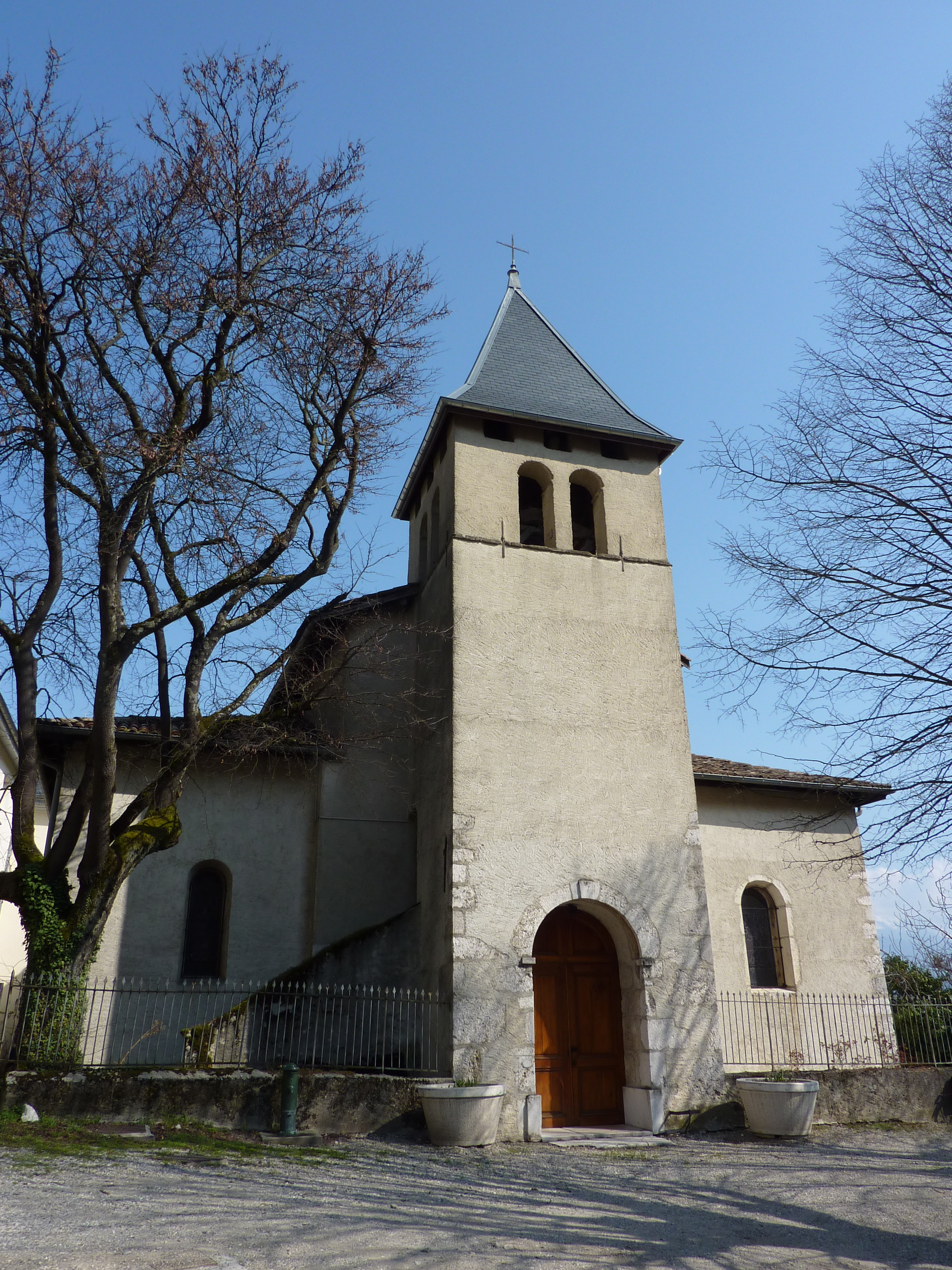
- The church of Seyssinet

- Coat of arms
- Location of Seyssinet-Pariset
- Location within France Location within Auvergne-Rhône-Alpes
- Coordinates: 45°10′59″N 5°41′49″E
- Country: France
- Region: Auvergne-Rhône-Alpes
- Department: Isère
- Arrondissement: Grenoble
- Canton: Fontaine-Seyssinet
- Intercommunality: Grenoble-Alpes Métropole

Government
  - Mayor (2020–2026): Guillaume Lissy
- Area^{1}: 10.65 km^{2} (4.11 sq mi)
- Elevation: 262 m (860 ft)
- Highest elevation: 1,565 m (5,135 ft)
- Lowest elevation: 209 m (686 ft)
- Population (2023): 11,739
  - Density: 1,102/km^{2} (2,855/sq mi)
- Time zone: UTC+01:00 (CET)
  - Summer (DST): UTC+02:00 (CEST)
- INSEE/Postal code: 38485 /38170
- ^{1} French Land Register data, which excludes lakes, ponds, glaciers > 1 km^{2} (0.386 sq mi or 247 acres) and river estuaries.

Seyssinet-Pariset (French pronunciation: [sɛsinɛ paʁizɛ]) is a commune in the Isère department in southeastern France. It is part of the Grenoble urban unit (agglomeration).

== Population ==
Historical population

Year	Pop.	±% p.a.
1793	571	—
1800	673	+2.38%
1806	730	+1.36%
1821	734	+0.04%
1831	914	+2.22%
1836	957	+0.92%
1841	973	+0.33%
1846	1,006	+0.67%
1851	936	−1.43%
1856	944	+0.17%
1861	932	−0.26%
1866	930	−0.04%
1872	914	−0.29%
1876	904	−0.27%
1881	886	−0.40%
1886	903	+0.38%
1891	992	+1.90%
1896	904	−1.84%
1901	861	−0.97%

Year	Pop.	±% p.a.
1906	846	−0.35%
1911	970	+2.77%
1921	951	−0.20%
1926	1,342	+7.13%
1931	1,319	−0.35%
1936	1,358	+0.58%
1946	1,612	+1.73%
1954	2,072	+3.19%
1962	4,539	+10.30%
1968	10,869	+15.67%
1975	12,157	+1.61%
1982	12,893	+0.84%
1990	13,241	+0.33%
1999	13,074	−0.14%
2007	12,582	−0.48%
2012	12,147	−0.70%
2017	12,013	−0.22%
2023	11,739	−0.38%

Source: EHESS and INSEE (1968-2023)

== Sights ==
The tour sans Venin, located in the hamlet of Pariset, is known as one of the Seven wonders of Dauphiné.

== Notable people ==
- Marcel Trillat (1940–2020), journalist and documentary filmmaker.

== See also ==
- Parc naturel régional du Vercors
