= Fontaine, Isère =

Fontaine Fontana (Arpitan)
- Commune
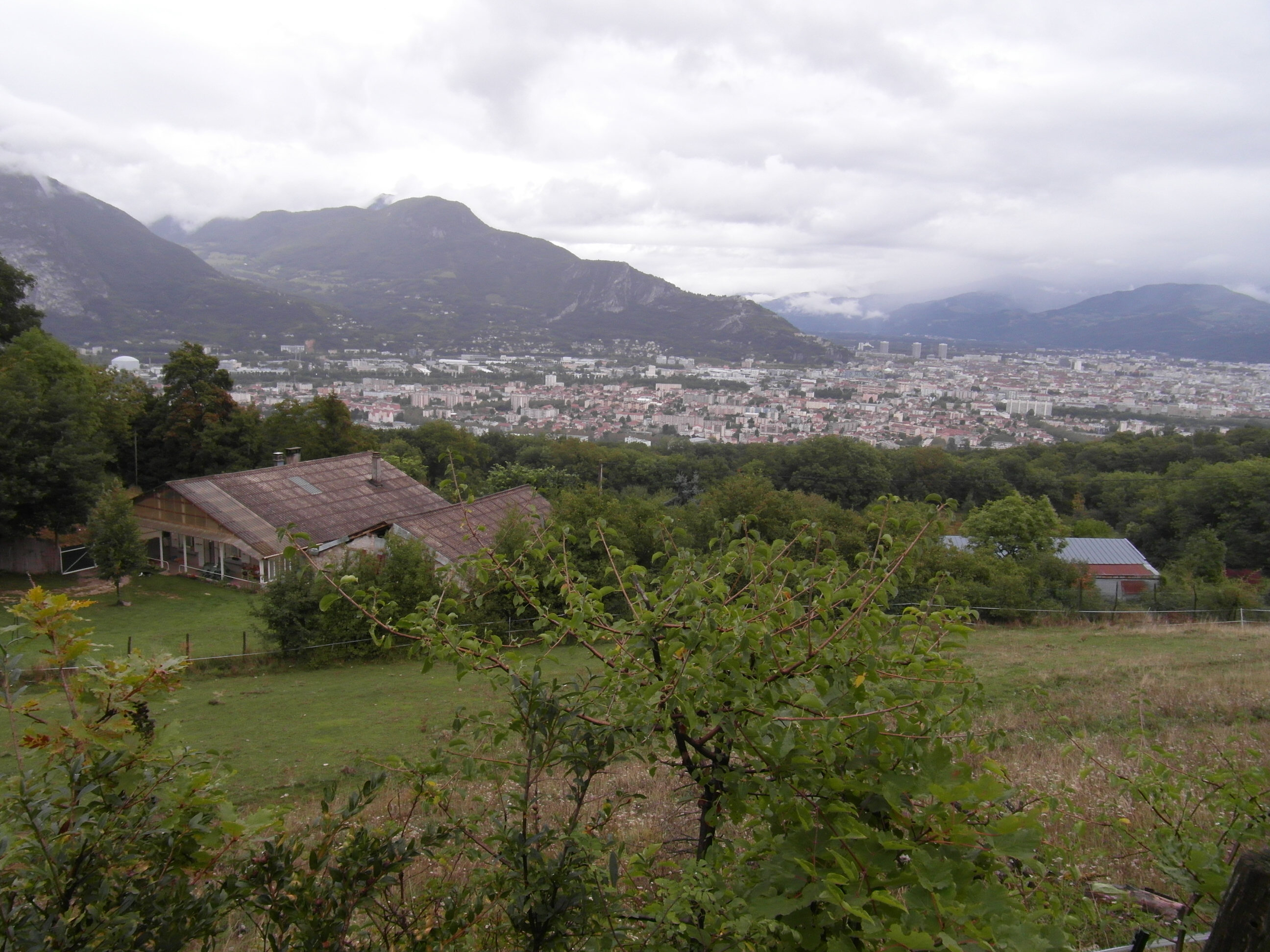
- A general view of Fontaine

- Coat of arms
- Location of Fontaine
- Location within France Location within Auvergne-Rhône-Alpes
- Coordinates: 45°11′38″N 5°41′08″E
- Country: France
- Region: Auvergne-Rhône-Alpes
- Department: Isère
- Arrondissement: Grenoble
- Canton: Fontaine-Seyssinet and Fontaine-Vercors
- Intercommunality: Grenoble-Alpes Métropole

Government
  - Mayor (2020–2026): Franck Longo
- Area^{1}: 6.74 km^{2} (2.60 sq mi)
- Highest elevation: 1,007 m (3,304 ft)
- Lowest elevation: 202 m (663 ft)
- Population (2023): 22,020
  - Density: 3,270/km^{2} (8,460/sq mi)
- Time zone: UTC+01:00 (CET)
  - Summer (DST): UTC+02:00 (CEST)
- INSEE/Postal code: 38169 /38600
- ^{1} French Land Register data, which excludes lakes, ponds, glaciers > 1 km^{2} (0.386 sq mi or 247 acres) and river estuaries.

Fontaine (French pronunciation: [fɔ̃tɛn]; Arpitan: Fontana) is a commune in the Isère department in southeastern France. Part of the Grenoble urban unit (agglomeration), it is the third-largest suburb of the city of Grenoble, and is adjacent to it on the west.

== History ==
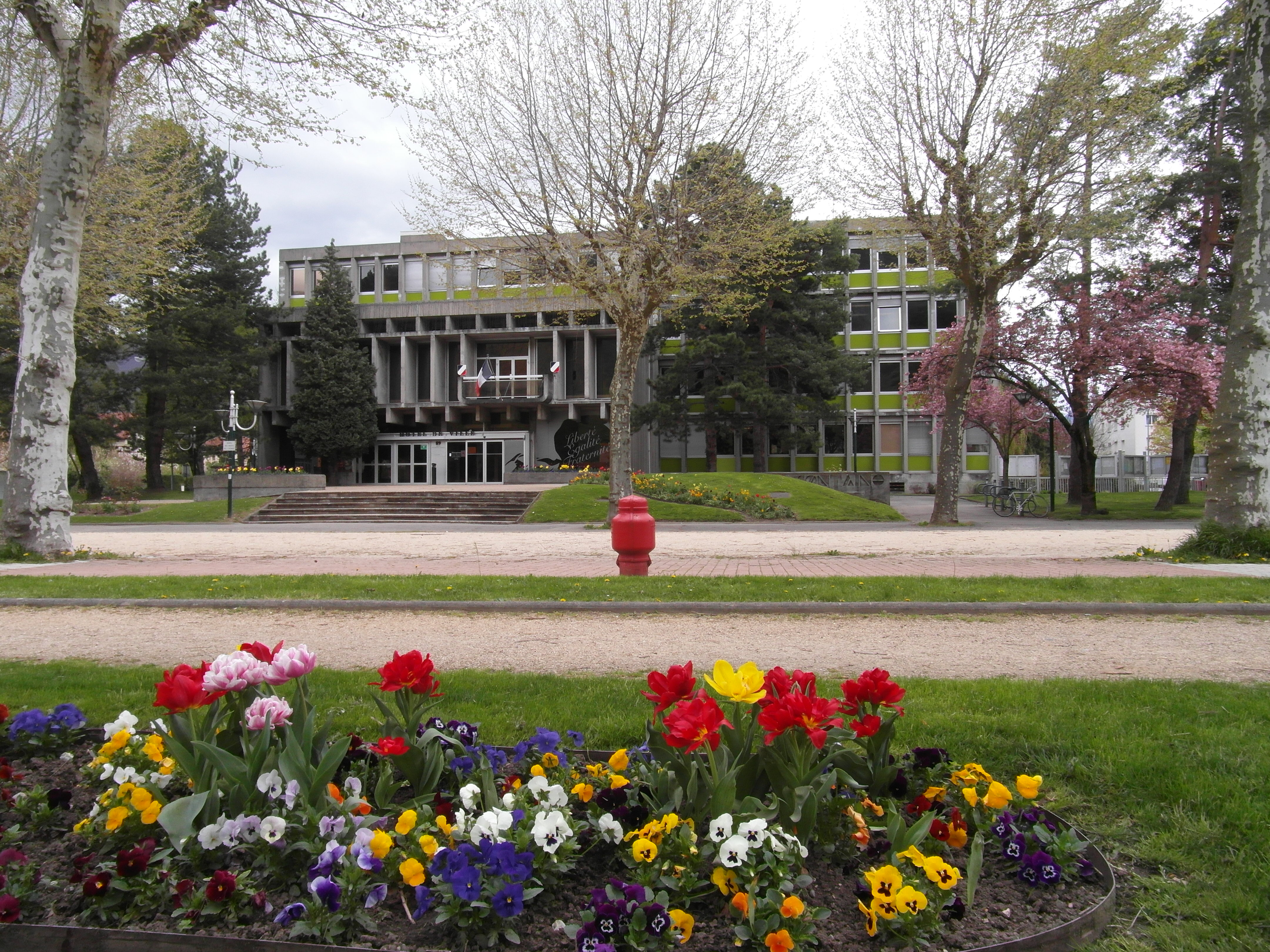
The Hôtel de Ville

The Hôtel de Ville was completed in 1972.

== Population ==
Historical population

Year	Pop.	±% p.a.
1793	500	—
1800	395	−3.31%
1806	546	+5.54%
1821	641	+1.08%
1831	673	+0.49%
1836	733	+1.72%
1841	857	+3.18%
1846	895	+0.87%
1851	885	−0.22%
1856	839	−1.06%
1861	1,016	+3.90%
1866	889	−2.64%
1872	1,068	+3.10%
1876	1,082	+0.33%
1881	1,226	+2.53%
1886	1,252	+0.42%
1891	1,349	+1.50%
1896	1,530	+2.55%
1901	1,785	+3.13%

Year	Pop.	±% p.a.
1906	1,952	+1.80%
1911	2,211	+2.52%
1921	2,930	+2.86%
1926	4,808	+10.41%
1931	6,722	+6.93%
1936	7,073	+1.02%
1946	7,594	+0.71%
1954	8,817	+1.88%
1962	15,102	+6.96%
1968	22,236	+6.66%
1975	25,036	+1.71%
1982	22,827	−1.31%
1990	22,853	+0.01%
1999	23,323	+0.23%
2007	22,394	−0.51%
2012	22,050	−0.31%
2017	22,523	+0.43%
2023	22,020	−0.38%

Source: EHESS and INSEE (1968-2023)

== Twin towns – sister cities ==
Fontaine is twinned with:

- Schmalkalden, Germany (1963)
- Alpignano, Italy (1971)
- Sommatino, Italy (1991)

== See also ==
- Parc naturel régional du Vercors
