= Evolution (2015 film) =

2015 film

- Film poster
- Directed by: Lucile Hadžihalilović
- Written by: Lucile Hadžihalilović; Alantė Kavaitė
- Produced by: Julien Naveau; Sylvie Pialat; Sebastián Álvarez
- Starring: Max Brebant; Roxane Duran; Julie-Marie Parmentier
- Cinematography: Manuel Dacosse
- Edited by: Nassim Gordji-Tehrani
- Music by: Zacarías M. de la Riva
- Distributed by: Potemkine Films (France)
- Release dates: 14 September 2015 (TIFF); 16 March 2016 (France)
- Running time: 81 minutes
- Countries: France; Spain; Belgium
- Language: French

Evolution (French: Évolution) is a 2015 French science fiction horror-thriller film directed by Lucile Hadžihalilović. It was shown in the Vanguard section of the 2015 Toronto International Film Festival.

== Plot ==
Nicolas is a sickly young boy living by the sea with his mother. One day while swimming in the sea, he thinks he sees the body of a dead boy with a red starfish at his waist. He tells his mother, who goes diving and brings back the starfish, but she tells him there is no body there. Later that night, his mother brings back the body and the other mothers gather around it.

The following day Nicolas plays with his starfish. After another boy mocks him for being afraid of it, he grows angry and attacks the boy, and later hacks off one of the arms of the starfish. After his outburst, his mother takes him to a hospital for observation. At the hospital, a doctor makes an incision just above Nicolas' stomach. Nicolas finds himself in a ward with other young boys who have been similarly operated on.

At night, the nurses watch videos of cesarean sections being performed.

Once released, Nicolas begins to suspect his mother and the nurses of having lied to him. He and his friend, Victor, sneak out in the middle of the night to observe what the mothers are doing. Victor runs back home, but Nicolas sees the women lying together completely nude, writhing around in mud, and passing around an object from one to another. At home, he sneaks a peek at his mother as she is showering off the mud and observes that she has what appears to be suckers on her back.

Back at the hospital, Nicolas is given an ultrasound. To his mother's apparent joy, they hear the heart beat of a fetus. Victor is operated on and a creature is taken out of his stomach and put in a jar. Victor dies during his operation, but the nurses tell Nicolas and the other boys that he is recovering. A nurse brings a conch shell into the ward, saying that Victor has sent it to them. Nicolas's mother visits him, and he refuses to eat what she feeds him. When she becomes upset and begins to look through his sketchbook, he accuses her of not being his real mother.

Nicolas develops a friendship with one of the nurses, Stella. Stella sneaks Nicolas crayons and paper and draws with him. Nicolas' drawings include a dead boy and starfishes but also a bicycle, a car, a building, and a giraffe. Nicolas is drawing these from memory, as they cannot be found in the village; this suggests that he was kidnapped and brought there. The other boys on the island may have been kidnapped as well, since some of them also observe that their mothers are not who they claim to be. In the video that the nurses watch, a baby is delivered.

Stella shows Nicolas a file with pictures of women with suckers on their backs, including one of a young girl. One night, she takes him down to the sea, shows him the suckers on her back, and allows him to touch them before taking him into the water. She holds him under water until he drowns, then revives him using CPR. Nicholas goes back to the hospital and after awakening from a nightmare, sneaks into another room where he finds one of the boys. When Nicolas approaches, the boy lays Nicolas's hand on his own stomach and he feels movement in the boy's body. After forcing Nicolas to press on his stomach, he begins to vomit. Nicolas leaves and enters a different room where he sees one of the boys floating in a tank. He is caught by a nurse, and after a final surgery, Nicolas awakens in a tank himself. He is in restraints and sees what appear to be two babies floating inside the tank with him.

Nicolas again finds himself by the sea with Stella. They again enter the water, but this time she presses her mouth to his as she swims with him, giving him air to breathe underwater. She pushes him back to the surface and the two end up in a small rowboat floating away from the island. After making sure Nicolas has a drink of fresh water, Stella slips back into the sea, presumably to go back to the island. Nicolas stays on the boat and by nightfall finds himself approaching the harbour of a major city.

== Cast ==
- Max Brebant as Nicolas
- Roxane Duran as Stella
- Julie-Marie Parmentier as Mother
- Nissim Renard as Frank
- Mathieu Goldfeld as Victor
- Pablo-Noé Étienne as Lucas

== Critical response ==
Evolution received generally positive reviews from critics. Review aggregator website Rotten Tomatoes reports an approval rating of 82% based on 62 reviews, with an average rating of 7.26/10. The site's critics' consensus reads: "Creepy, provocative, and aesthetically absorbing, Evolution marks a satisfying step forward for director/co-writer Lucile Hadzihalilovic." At Metacritic, which assigns a normalized rating out of 100 to reviews from mainstream critics, the film received an average score of 77 based on 19 reviews, indicating "generally favorable reviews".

== Accolades ==
Award / Film Festival	Category	Recipients and nominees	Result
Magritte Awards	Best Cinematography	Manuel Dacosse	Nominated
San Sebastián International Film Festival	Special Jury Prize		Won
San Sebastián International Film Festival	Best Cinematography	Manuel Dacosse	Won
Stockholm International Film Festival	Best Cinematography	Manuel Dacosse	Won
Utopiales	Grand Jury Prize		Won
