= Maurice Failevic =

French film director

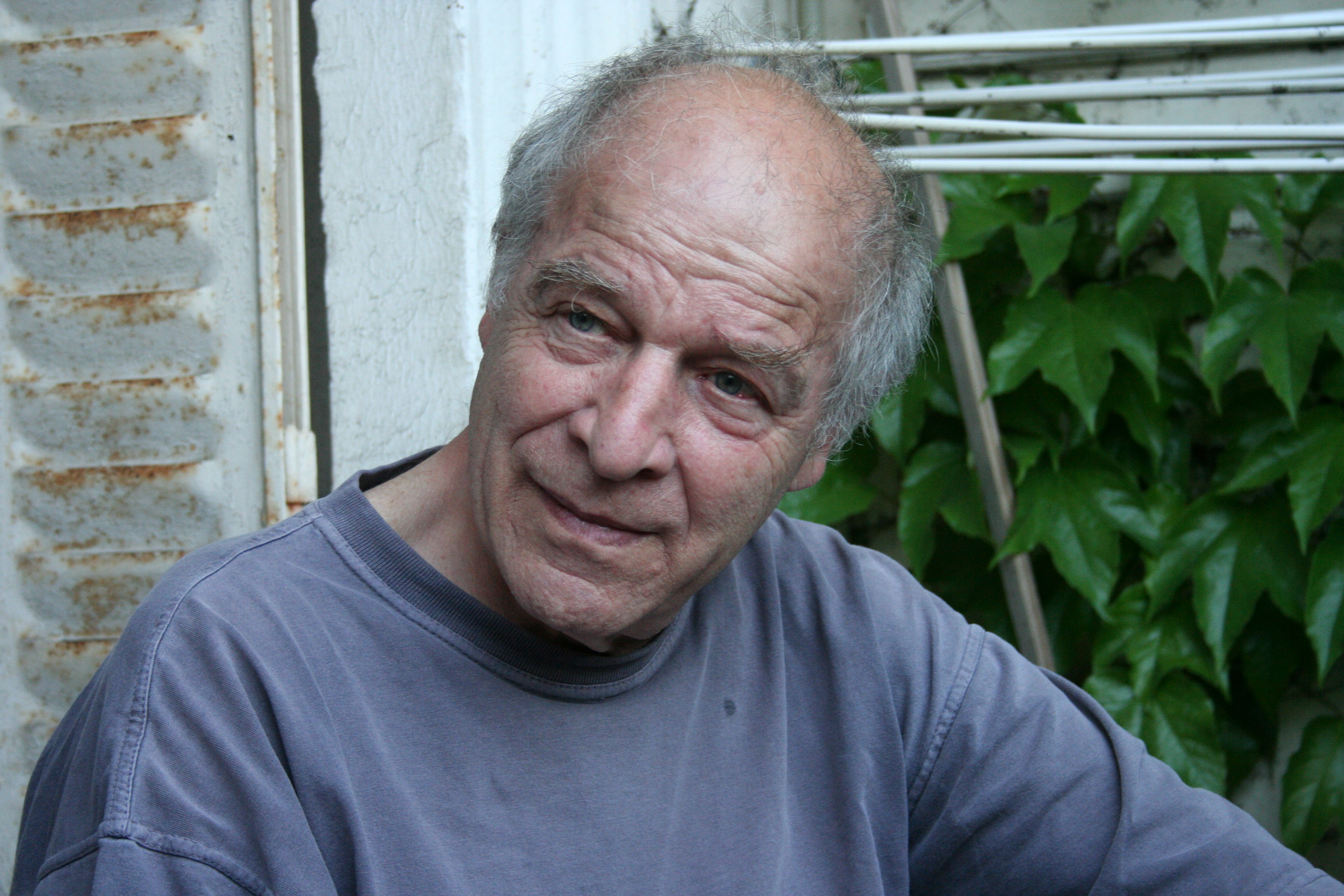
- Maurice Failevic in 2008
- Born: 14 August 1933; Paris, France
- Died: 27 December 2016 (aged 83); Paris, France
- Education: Institut des hautes études cinématographiques
- Occupation: Film director

Maurice Failevic (14 August 1933 – 27 December 2016) was a French film director. A communist, he directed 50+ films about class struggles, depicting the lives of members of the French working class, from peasants during the French Revolution to the unemployed, factory workers and banlieue dwellers in the 20th century. He directed films for cinema and television as well as documentaries.

He was the recipient of several awards for his work, including the Prix de la critique from the International Critics' Week twice, the Fipa d'or and the Fipa d'argent, and the Grand Prix from the Société des Auteurs et Compositeurs Dramatiques. On his death, the French Culture Minister, Audrey Azoulay, said he "stood for an activist approach to cinema, based on his commitment to political and social engagement".

== Early life ==
Maurice Failevic was born on 14 August 1933 in Paris, France. His father was an immigrant from Lithuania who worked as a miner and later a storekeeper.

Failevic graduated from the Institut des hautes études cinématographiques. He became a communist activist in 1953, and he attended the 4th World Festival of Youth and Students in Bucharest, Romania.

== Career ==
Failevic began his career as an assistant director to Henri Spade and Jacques Krier at the Radiodiffusion-Télévision Française in 1962. He directed films for cinema and television as well as documentaries. He chose to spend most of his career working in television as opposed to cinema to have a regular income and support his family. Over the course of his career, he directed over 50 television and documentary films. He also served as the director of the Directing Department at La Fémis from 1985 to 1996.

Most of Failevic's films focus on class struggles. He first directed Les Femmes aussi, a television series, in 1967. He directed his first film, Naissance d’un spectacle, un événement ordinaire, in 1968. Three years later, in 1971, he directed De la belle ouvrage; the television film was about the struggle of a factory worker to handle new technology. In 1972, he directed Patrick et Sylvie, 9 ans, a film about a school exchange in a banlieue, or lower-class neighborhood. In 1975, he directed Gouverneurs de la rosée, based on a novel about sugarcane planters by Haitian author Jacques Roumain. In 1976, he directed Le Journal d’un prêtre ouvrier, or the diary of a worker-priest.

In 1977, Failevic released 1788, a film about the struggle of villagers before the French Revolution, their awakening with the advent of the Cahiers de doléances, and their disillusionment in the wake of the abolition of privileges on 4 August 1789. It was called a "cognitive fiction" by philosopher Jean-Marie Schaeffer. Director Jean Chérasse considered 1788 to be Failevic's best film. In 1981, he directed Le cheval vapeur, a documentary about the use of tractors to replace men in fields. In 1987, he directed Bonne chance monsieur Pic, a film pitting an employed man against a successful businessman. With Ahmed Rachedi, Failevic co-directed C’était la guerre in 1993. A television film about the Algerian War, it was based on the 1989 novel La Paix des braves by Jean-Claude Carrière. In 1997, Failevic directed Le premier qui dit non, a film about a football player who returns to the lower-class neighborhood of his childhood to meet the drug dealers who murdered his brother.

In 2001, with Marcel Trillat, Failevic co-directed Les Prolos, a documentary about the French working class in the 21st century. A year later, they worked together on 300 jours de colère, another documentary about the factory workers of the Mossley Group in Hellemmes-Lille, northern France, who bargain collectively for severance packages. In 2004, he directed Jusqu'au bout, a television mini-series based on the real-life protests of workers at the Cellatex factory in Givet, in the Ardennes, over its 2000 closure. Failevic hired the workers as extras, thus increasing its verisimilitude. In 2010, with Trillat, he co-directed L'Atlantide, une histoire du communisme, a documentary about the history of communism in France. In it, Failevic expressed his nostalgia for a bygone era when communism was still popular in France.

Failevic was honored with the Prix de la critique by the International Critics' Week for De la belle ouvrage in 1971 and for Gouverneurs de la rosée in 1975. He won the Prix de télévision Albert Ollivier from the Académie française for La Belle ouvrage in 1972. He also won the Fipa d'or from the Festival International de Programmes Audiovisuels for C’était la guerre in 1983 and the Fipa d’argent for Jusqu'au bout in 2005. In 2005, he won the Grand Prix for Jusqu'au bout from the Société des Auteurs et Compositeurs Dramatiques.

Failevic was an active member of the Syndicat français des réalisateurs de Télévision, a subgroup of the General Confederation of Labour (CGT), the second largest labor union in France.

== Death and legacy ==
Failevic died on 27 December 2016 in Paris, at the age of 83.

The French Culture and Communication Minister Audrey Azoulay said, "Maurice Failevic stood for an activist approach to cinema, based on his commitment to political and social engagement." The General Confederation of Labour (CGT) also paid tribute to him on their website by saying he "combined political engagement with artistry, especially in his later years".

== Filmography ==
- Les Femmes aussi (1967), a television series
- Naissance d’un spectacle, un événement ordinaire (1968)
- De la belle ouvrage (1971), television film
- Journal d’un prêtre ouvrier (1976)

== Works ==
- Failevic, Maurice; La Rochefoucauld, Jean-Dominique (1978). 1788: Luttes révolutionnaires pour une propriété paysanne. Paris: Éditions sociales. ISBN 9782209052943. OCLC 5213152.
