= Seyssins =

- Commune
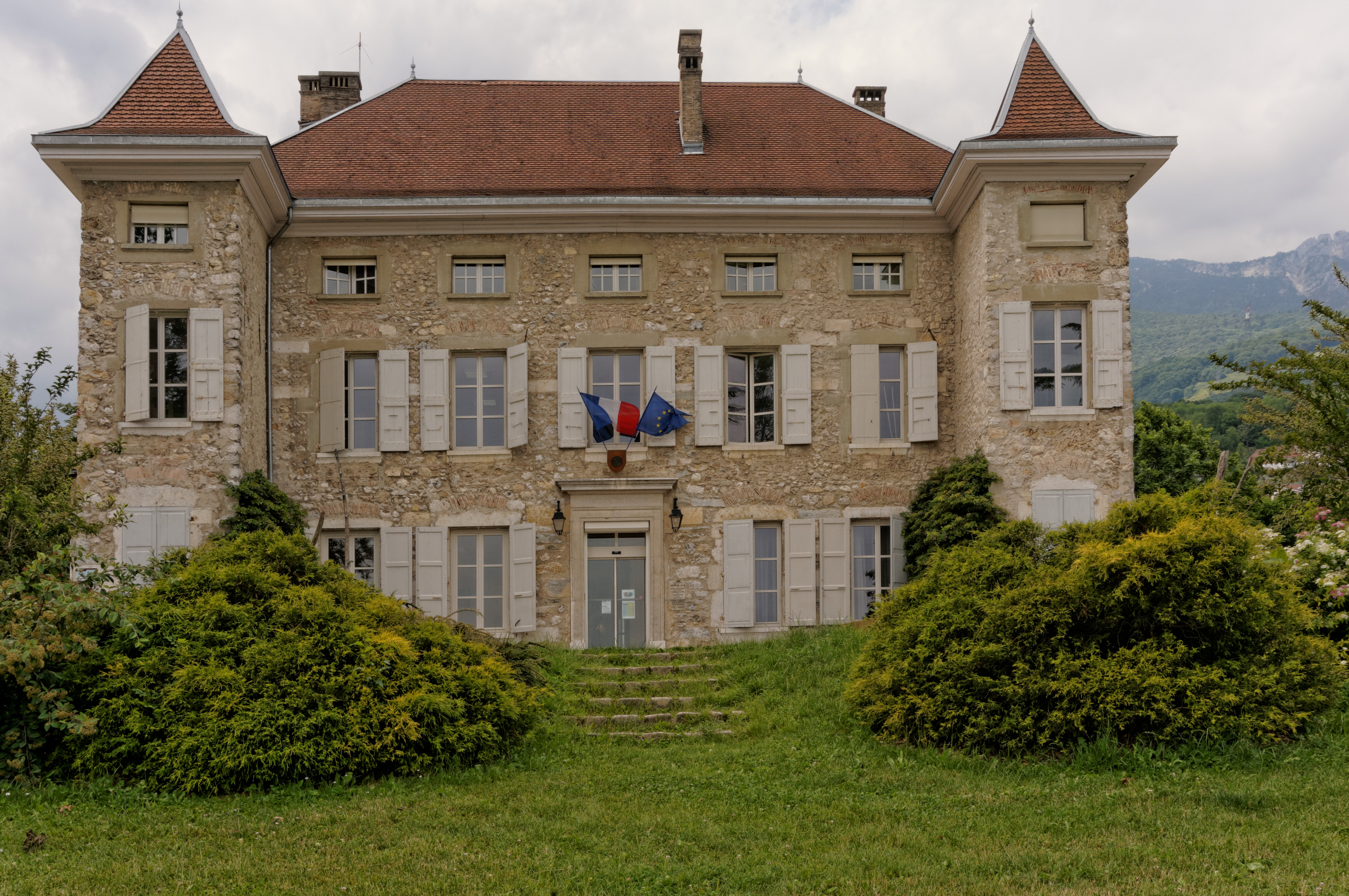
- Town hall

- Coat of arms
- Location of Seyssins
- Location within France Location within Auvergne-Rhône-Alpes
- Coordinates: 45°09′47″N 5°41′10″E
- Country: France
- Region: Auvergne-Rhône-Alpes
- Department: Isère
- Arrondissement: Grenoble
- Canton: Fontaine-Seyssinet
- Intercommunality: Grenoble-Alpes Métropole

Government
  - Mayor (2020–2026): Fabrice Hugelé
- Area^{1}: 8 km^{2} (3.1 sq mi)
- Elevation: 301 m (988 ft)
- Highest elevation: 1,897 m (6,224 ft)
- Lowest elevation: 219 m (719 ft)
- Population (2023): 8,092
  - Density: 1,000/km^{2} (2,600/sq mi)
- Time zone: UTC+01:00 (CET)
  - Summer (DST): UTC+02:00 (CEST)
- INSEE/Postal code: 38486 /38180
- ^{1} French Land Register data, which excludes lakes, ponds, glaciers > 1 km^{2} (0.386 sq mi or 247 acres) and river estuaries.

Seyssins (French pronunciation: [sesɛ̃]) is a commune in the Isère department in southeastern France. It is part of the Grenoble urban unit (agglomeration).

== Population ==
Historical population

Year	Pop.	±% p.a.
1793	669	—
1800	623	−1.01%
1806	724	+2.54%
1821	768	+0.39%
1831	833	+0.82%
1836	914	+1.87%
1841	1,196	+5.53%
1846	1,162	−0.58%
1851	1,387	+3.60%
1856	1,374	−0.19%
1861	2,238	+10.25%
1866	659	−21.69%
1872	654	−0.13%
1876	675	+0.79%
1881	669	−0.18%
1886	700	+0.91%
1891	641	−1.75%
1896	605	−1.15%
1901	566	−1.32%

Year	Pop.	±% p.a.
1906	577	+0.39%
1911	540	−1.32%
1921	502	−0.73%
1926	528	+1.02%
1931	532	+0.15%
1936	513	−0.72%
1946	500	−0.26%
1954	762	+5.41%
1962	1,007	+3.55%
1968	1,573	+7.72%
1975	3,911	+13.90%
1982	5,021	+3.63%
1990	7,028	+4.29%
1999	6,850	−0.28%
2007	6,908	+0.11%
2012	6,970	+0.18%
2017	7,685	+1.97%
2023	8,092	+0.86%

Source: EHESS and INSEE (1968-2023)

== See also ==
- Parc naturel régional du Vercors
