= Marcel Trillat =

French journalist (1940–2020)

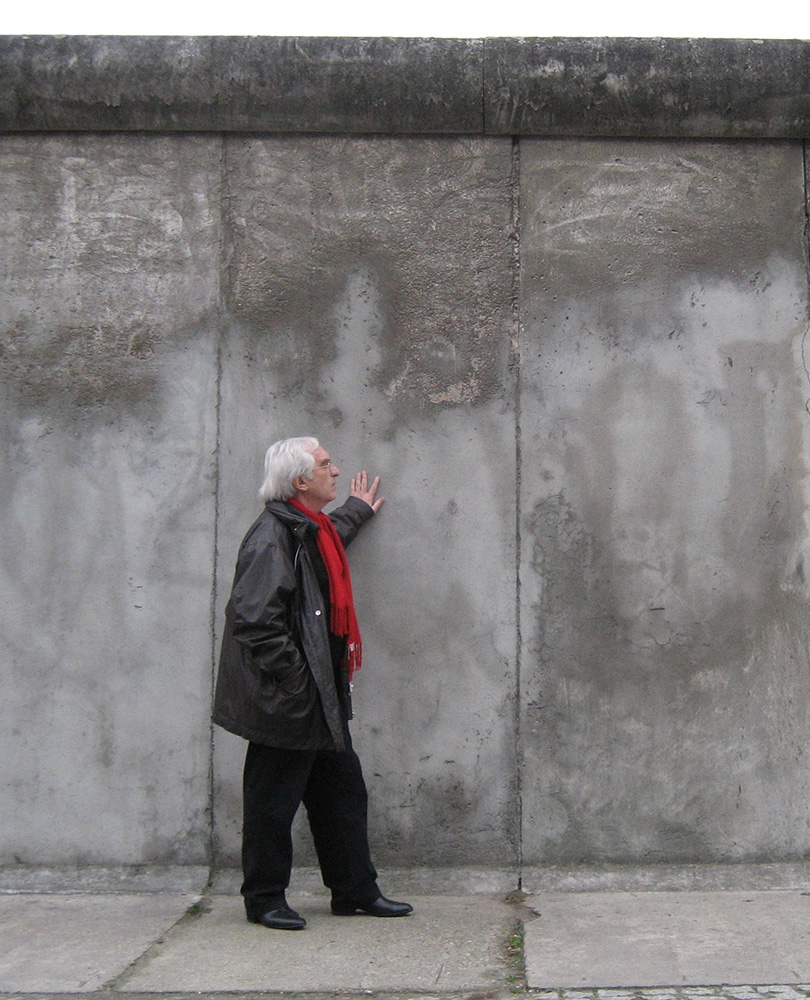
- Born: 4 April 1940; Seyssinet-Pariset, Isère, France
- Died: 18 September 2020 (aged 80); Paris, France
- Occupations: Journalist, documentary filmmaker

Marcel Trillat (4 April 1940 – 18 September 2020) was a French journalist and documentary filmmaker. He directed many documentaries about the living conditions of workers, women and immigrants in France. He also did documentaries about French government's response to the Algerian War and the Gulf War and religious cults and public hospitals. He co-directed a documentary with Maurice Failevic, about the history of communism in France.

== Early life ==
Marcel Trillat was born on 4 April 1940 in Seyssinet-Pariset Isère, France. He grew up on a farm, and his parents were farmers. He joined the French Communist Party at the age of 16, until 1987. He attended a normal school to become a schoolteacher.

== Career ==
Trillat began his career in television as an intern at the Office de Radiodiffusion Télévision Française in 1965. He first worked on a program called Cinq colonnes à la une. He was fired for his politics in 1968. He subsequently joined SCOPCOLOR (production cooperative) and UNICITE (film producer of PCF) as well as the General Confederation of Labour. Meanwhile, he worked for Radio Lorraine Coeur d'Acier, an independent radio station created by the CGT in Longwy, Meurthe-et-Moselle. He returned to public broadcasting in 1981, as journalist, manager, foreign correspondent or deputy director of the newscast on Antenne 2, later known as France 2, until 2006. He also served on the board of directors of France Télévisions as union representative (CGT) from 2001 to 2006.

Trillat directed one of his first documentary, Étranges étrangers, in 1970. It showed the living conditions of Portuguese and African immigrants in Aubervilliers and Nanterre. In 1981, he directed a report about the Paris massacre of 1961. A decade later, in 1991, he directed a report as correspondent about the Gulf War, where he said on live television that the footage of the war was restricted by the United States and France. In 1994, he directed Travailleurs fantômes. With Éric Delagneau, he directed Témoins de Jehovah : demain l'Apocalypse, a documentary which describes the Jehovah's Witness as a cult, in 1998. He also directed Les Enfants de la dalle, a documentary about children who grew up in Corbeil-Essonnes, in 1998.

In 2001, Trillat directed Les Prolos, a documentary about the French working class in the 21st century, and 300 jours de colère, another documentary about the factory workers of the Mossley Group in Hellemmes-Lille, northern France, who bargain collectively for severance packages. In 2003, he directed SOS hôpital, 24 heures dans la vie d'un hosto, a documentary about the poor state of French public hospitals. In 2005, he directed Femmes précaires, a documentary about women trapped in precarious work. In 2007, he directed Silence dans la vallée, a documentary about workers in Nouzonville, Ardennes who lose their jobs when their jobs are outsourced overseas. In 2010, he co-directed a documentary with Maurice Failevic called L'Atlantide, une histoire du communisme, it chronicled the history of communism in France. In 2013, he directed a documentary about the trials and tribulations of undocumented immigrants in Paris.

Trillat openly supported the Left Front in 2011. In 2015, he signed a petition to maintain the right to protest in spite of the state of emergency.

Trillat died 18 September 2020 in Paris, aged 80.

== Personal life ==
With Catherine Dehaut, Trillat had a son, Julien.
