= Nicolas Pariser =

French filmmaker (born 1974)

- Pariser in 2026
- Born: 29 September 1974 (age 51); Paris, France
- Education: Sorbonne University
- Occupations: Director; screenwriter
- Years active: 2008–present
- Children: 1

Nicolas Pariser (born 29 September 1974) is a French filmmaker.

== Early life ==
Pariser was born in Paris to dentist parents, and was raised in Chartres. He attended Lycée Marceau before studying law, philosophy, art history, and film at Sorbonne University. During his studies, he attended a film course taught by Éric Rohmer at the Institut d'Art et d'Archéologie.

== Career ==
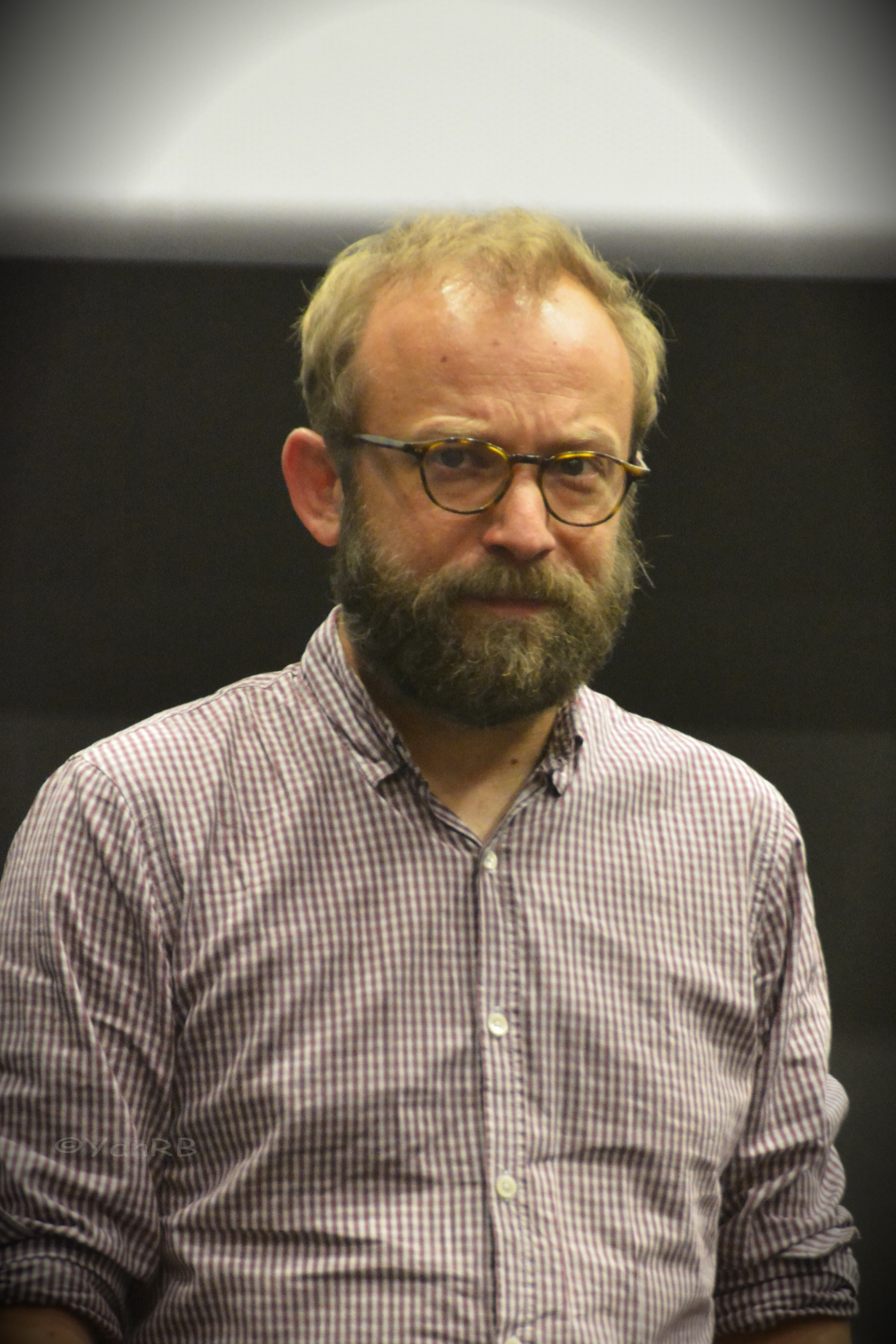
Pariser in 2019

Pariser worked as a film critic at a magazine before becoming a production assistant at Pathé. He also worked as director Pierre Rissient's assistant for four years. He wrote and directed his first short film, Le Jour où Ségolène a gagné, in 2008. His second short film, La République, won the Prix Jean Vigo in 2010.

His debut feature film, The Great Game, won the Louis Delluc Prize for Best First Film in 2015. His second and third feature films, Alice and the Mayor and Le Parfum vert, were screened in the Directors' Fortnight section of the 2019 and 2022 Cannes Film Festival, respectively. His fourth feature film, One Minute to Midnight, premiered in the main competition of the 83rd Venice International Film Festival in September 2026.

== Personal life ==
Pariser has a daughter.

== Filmography ==
=== Feature films ===
Year	English title	Original title	Director	Writer	Ref.
2015	The Great Game	Le Grand Jeu	Yes	Yes	
2019	Alice and the Mayor	Alice et le Maire	Yes	Yes	
2022	The Green Perfume	Le Parfum vert	Yes	Yes	
2026	One Minute to Midnight	Un peu avant minuit	Yes	Yes	

=== Short films ===
Year	Title	Director	Writer	Ref.
2008	Le Jour où Ségolène a gagné	Yes	Yes	
2010	La République	Yes	Yes	
2013	Agit Pop	Yes	Yes	

=== Television ===
Year	Title	Director	Writer	Notes	Ref.
2021	In Therapy	Yes	No	7 episodes	
