= Claix, Isère =

Claix
- Commune
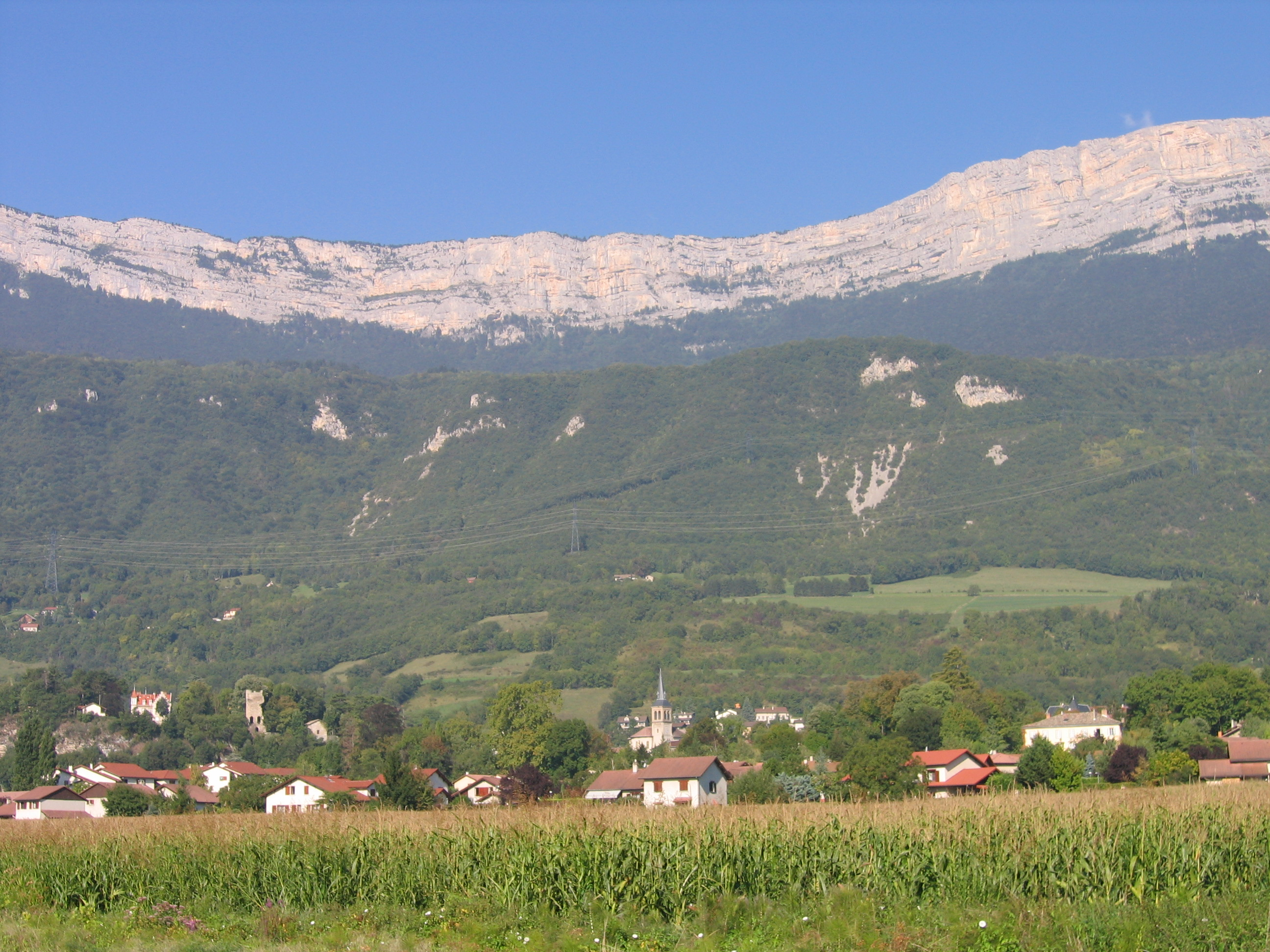
- A general view of Claix

- Coat of arms
- Location of Claix
- Location within France Location within Auvergne-Rhône-Alpes
- Coordinates: 45°07′13″N 5°40′21″E
- Country: France
- Region: Auvergne-Rhône-Alpes
- Department: Isère
- Arrondissement: Grenoble
- Canton: Fontaine-Seyssinet
- Intercommunality: Grenoble-Alpes Métropole

Government
  - Mayor (2020–2026): Christophe Revil
- Area^{1}: 24.12 km^{2} (9.31 sq mi)
- Elevation: 300 m (980 ft)
- Highest elevation: 1,960 m (6,430 ft)
- Lowest elevation: 226 m (741 ft)
- Population (2023): 7,836
  - Density: 324.9/km^{2} (841.4/sq mi)
- Time zone: UTC+01:00 (CET)
  - Summer (DST): UTC+02:00 (CEST)
- INSEE/Postal code: 38111 /38640
- ^{1} French Land Register data, which excludes lakes, ponds, glaciers > 1 km^{2} (0.386 sq mi or 247 acres) and river estuaries.

Claix (French pronunciation: [klɛ]; Arpitan: Cllês) is a commune in the Isère department in southeastern France. It is part of the Grenoble urban unit (agglomeration).

== Population ==
Historical population

Year	Pop.	±% p.a.
1793	1,409	—
1800	1,316	−0.97%
1806	1,371	+0.68%
1821	1,533	+0.75%
1831	1,659	+0.79%
1836	1,711	+0.62%
1841	1,833	+1.39%
1846	1,840	+0.08%
1851	1,942	+1.08%
1856	1,933	−0.09%
1861	2,026	+0.94%
1866	2,102	+0.74%
1872	2,096	−0.05%
1876	1,345	−10.50%
1881	1,269	−1.16%
1886	1,270	+0.02%
1891	1,223	−0.75%
1896	1,250	+0.44%
1901	1,189	−1.00%

Year	Pop.	±% p.a.
1906	1,122	−1.15%
1911	1,093	−0.52%
1921	1,151	+0.52%
1926	1,306	+2.56%
1931	1,473	+2.44%
1936	1,373	−1.40%
1946	1,364	−0.07%
1954	1,878	+4.08%
1962	2,391	+3.06%
1968	3,105	+4.45%
1975	3,926	+3.41%
1982	5,382	+4.61%
1990	6,960	+3.27%
1999	7,388	+0.67%
2007	7,585	+0.33%
2012	7,727	+0.37%
2017	7,932	+0.53%
2023	7,836	−0.20%

Source: EHESS and INSEE (1968–2023)

== See also ==
- Parc naturel régional du Vercors
- Communes of the Isère department
