= Aurelia Mengin =

French director

Aurélia Mengin-Lecreulx
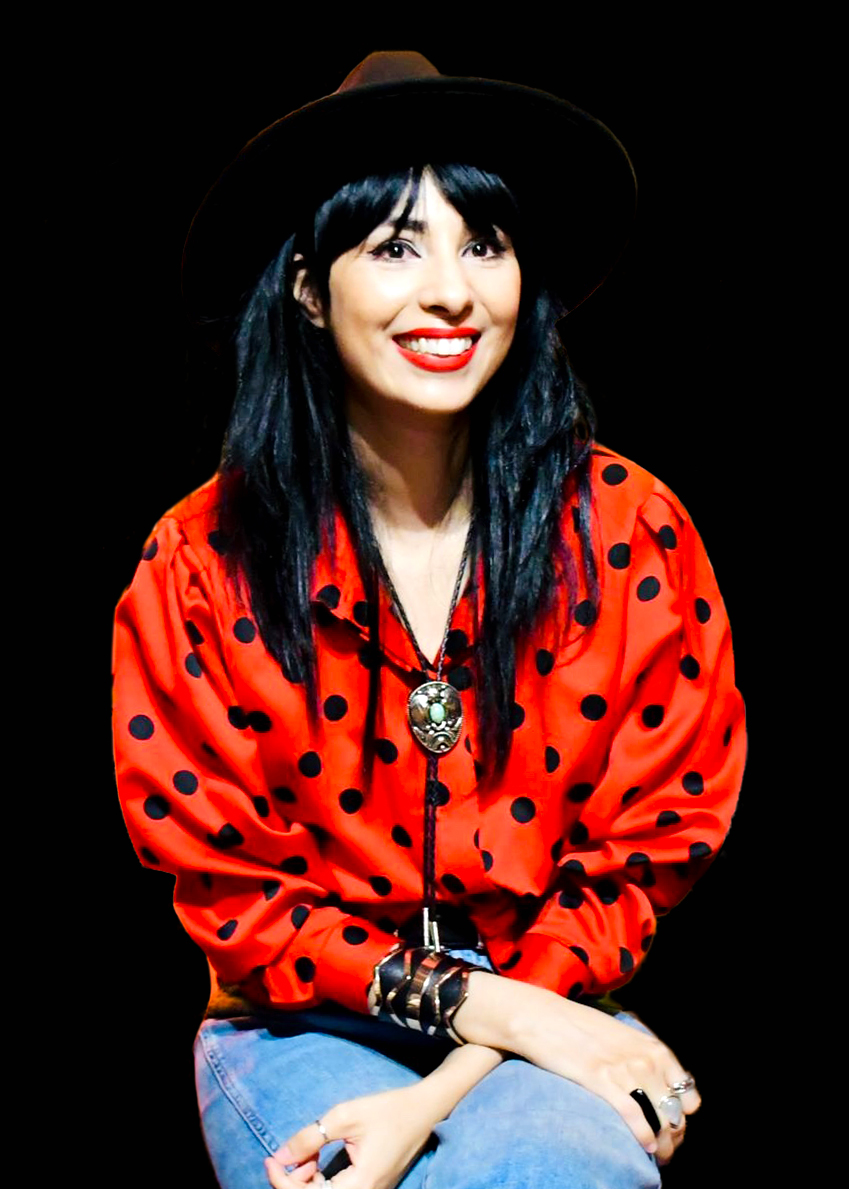
- Occupations: Actress; director; producer

Aurélia Mengin-Lecreulx is a Réunionnaise Actor, director and producer. She is the founder and director of the "Even Not Fear" Festival.

Her 2018 film Fornacis, the first to be directed by a woman from Réunion, won first prize at the Girona Film festival.

== Filmography ==
- Adam moins Eve, 2015
- Fornacis, 2018

== Awards ==
- 2015 Best long short film, Open World Film Festival, Toronto
- 2015 Best African Director, Festival International du Cinéma du Nigéria
- 2018 Girona Film Festival, First prize.
