= Lucile Hadžihalilović =

French film director and screenwriter (born 1961)

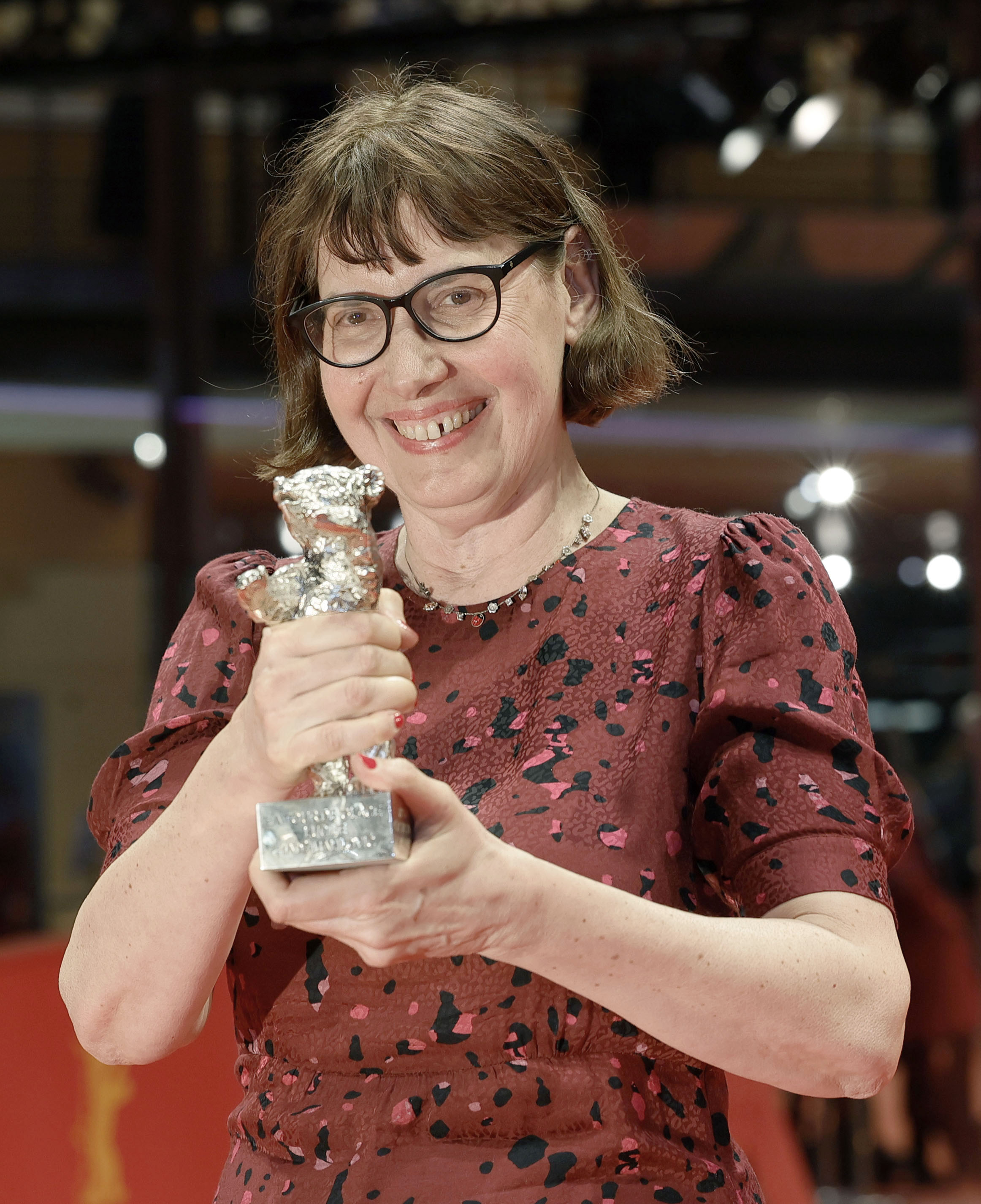
- Hadžihalilović in 2025
- Born: Lucile Emina Hadzihalilovic; 7 May 1961 (age 65); Lyon, France
- Education: La Fémis
- Occupations: Film director; screenwriter
- Years active: 1986–present
- Partner: Gaspar Noé (1985–present)

Lucile Emina Hadžihalilović (French: [lysil adʒialilɔvitʃ]; born 7 May 1961) is a French film director and screenwriter of Bosnian descent. She wrote and directed the short film La Bouche de Jean-Pierre (1996), and the feature films Innocence (2004)—for which she became the first woman to win the Stockholm International Film Festival's Bronze Horse Award for Best Film—Evolution (2015), Earwig (2021), and The Ice Tower (2025), the latter won the Silver Bear for Outstanding Artistic Contribution at the 2025 Berlin Film Festival.

== Early life and education ==
Hadžihalilović was born in Lyon, France on 7 May 1961, to a Bosnian Yugoslav father and a French mother and grew up in Morocco until she was 17.

She studied art history and graduated from the prestigious French film school La Fémis (previously Institut des hautes études cinématographiques) in 1987 with the short film La Première Mort de Nono.

== Career ==
=== 1986–1998: Early work ===
Hadžihalilović worked as an editor for a number of films before beginning her own projects. The first film she worked on was Sylvain Ledey's short Festin (1986), after which she edited Alain Bourges' 1991 documentary Horizons artificiels (Trois rêves d'architecture), which has been described as "three confrontations between the discourse on architecture and the architecture of speech."

In the early 1990s, she began to collaborate with the Argentine filmmaker Gaspar Noé. She produced and edited Noé's short film Carne (1991) and its sequel, the feature-length I Stand Alone (1998), and together they formed the production company Les Cinémas de la Zone in 1991. Noé explained their coming together as business partners: "we discovered that we shared a desire to make films atypical and we decided together to create our own society, Les Cinémas de la Zone, in order to finance our projects." Hadzihalilovic's first film after her graduation, La Bouche de Jean-Pierre (1996), was a result of this collaborative effort. Hadzihalilovic wrote, edited, produced, and directed the film while Noé worked as the cinematographer. La Bouche de Jean-Pierre was shown during the Un Certain Regard panel at the Cannes Film Festival, as well as being selected for various other notable festivals throughout the world. It is told through the eyes of a young girl, Mimi (Sandra Sammartino), whose mother had attempted suicide. Mimi is then relocated to live with her aunt (Denise Aron-Schropfer) and a man named Jean-Pierre (Michel Trillot). The film features child abuse, and ends with Mimi taking sleeping pills in an effort to copy her mother.

In 1994, Hadžihalilović worked on the short La Baigneuse by Joel Leberre. In 1998, Hadžihalilović made Good Boys Use Condoms, one of a series of erotic short films promoting condom use. Another in the series, Sodomites, was made by Noé.

=== 2004–2015: Innocence and acclaim ===
In 2004, she released the critically acclaimed film Innocence, starring Marion Cotillard and Hélène de Fougerolles. The film was inspired by the 1903 novella Mine-Haha, or On the Bodily Education of Young Girls by German playwright Frank Wedekind. The film follows three young girls who attend a secluded mysterious boarding school and their interactions with their teachers (Cotillard and Fougerolles). She has commented on the film's similarity or references to Peter Weir's Picnic at Hanging Rock (1975), Dario Argento's Suspiria (1977), and Victor Erice's The Spirit of the Beehive (1973).

Hadžihalilović released a short entitled Nectar in 2014, and the feature film Evolution in 2015. Evolution revolves around young boys who are subjected to mysterious treatments and live on an island inhabited solely by women and themselves.

Hadžihalilović also contributed to the screenplay of Noé's critically divisive Enter the Void (2009), and continued as a producer of Lux Æterna (2019) and Vortex (2021).

=== 2021–present: Established director ===
In 2021, Hadžihalilović released her first English-language feature, Earwig, about a girl whose teeth are made of ice, which won Special Jury Prize at San Sebastian Film Festival.

In 2025, Hadžihalilović released her fourth feature film, The Ice Tower, starring Marion Cotillard, on their second collaboration after Innocence (2004). The Ice Tower had its world premiere at the 2025 Berlin Film Festival in official competition, where it won the Silver Bear for Outstanding Artistic Contribution. It also won the awards for Best Film and Best Production Design at the 2025 Neuchâtel Fantastic Film Festival, and the Zabaltegi-Tabakalera Award at the 2025 San Sebastián Film Festival. The film was released theatrically in France by Metropolitan Filmexport on 17 September 2025. Yellow Veil Pictures acquired North American distribution rights to the film and released it theatrically in the United States on 3 October 2025.

== Personal life ==
Hadžihalilović has been in a relationship with Argentine filmmaker and frequent collaborator Gaspar Noé since 1985, after meeting on the set of Noé's first short film, Tintarella di Luna. Some sources say that Noé and Hadžihalilović are married, but Noé refers to Hadžihalilović as "my girlfriend" and "my life partner" in interviews. Noé considered Hadžihalilović's father as his second father.

Hadžihalilović is a member of the French gender equality group Collectif 50/50, which aims to promote equality between women and men and diversity in cinema and audiovisual.

== Favourite films ==
In 2022, Hadžihalilović participated in the Sight & Sound film polls of that year. It is held every ten years to select the greatest films of all time, by asking contemporary directors to select ten films of their choice. Hadzihalilovic selections were:

- 2001: A Space Odyssey (1968)
- Stalker (1979)
- Saikaku Ichidai Onna (1952)
- The Ascent (1977)
- Grave of the Fireflies (1988)
- The Red Shoes (1948)
- Last Year at Marienbad (1961)
- Tabu A Story of the South Seas (1931)
- Mamma Roma (1962)
- The Spirit of the Beehive (1973)

== Awards ==
Year	Award	Category	Film	Result
1996	Amiens International Film Festival	OCIC Award	La bouche de Jean-Pierre	Won
1996	Avignon Film Festival	Prix SACD	La bouche de Jean-Pierre	Won
1996	Cannes Film Festival	Golden Camera	La bouche de Jean-Pierre	Nominated
1997	Angers European First Film Festival	Best Screenplay	La bouche de Jean-Pierre	Won
1997	Clermont-Ferrand International Short Film Festival	National Competition	La bouche de Jean-Pierre	Won
2004	Stockholm International Film Festival	Bronze Horse	Innocence	Won
2004	San Sebastián International Film Festival	Best New Director	Innocence	Won
2005	Istanbul Film Festival	People's Choice Award -International Competition	Innocence	Won
2005	Istanbul Film Festival	FIPRESCI Prize - International Competition	Innocence	Won
2005	Neuchâtel International Fantastic Film Festival	Narcisse Award - Best Feature Film	Innocence	Won
2005	Neuchâtel International Fantastic Film Festival	Denis-de-Rougemont Youth Award	Innocence	Won
2005	Amsterdam Fantastic Film Festival	Grand Prize of European Fantasy Film in Silver - Honorable Mention	Innocence	Won
2005	Jeonju Film Festival	Woosuk Award - Indie Vision	Innocence	Nominated
2009	Sundance Film Festival	NHK Award	Lucile Hadzihalilovic	Won
2014	Côté Court Festival	Grand Prix - Fiction	Nectar	Nominated
2014	Festival International du Film Indépendant de Bordeaux	Grand Prize of the Jury - Short Prize	Nectar	Nominated
2015	London Film Festival	Best Film - Official Competition	Évolution	Nominated
2015	AFI Fest	Short Award - New Auteurs	Évolution	Nominated
2015	San Sebastián International Film Festival	Golden Seashell - Best Film	Évolution	Nominated
2015	San Sebastián International Film Festival	Special Prize of the Jury	Évolution	Won
2015	Stockholm International Film Festival	Bronze Horse - Best Film	Évolution	Nominated
2015	TheWIFTS Foundation International Visionary Awards	The Adrienne Fancey Award - Best Film	Évolution	Won
2016	Istanbul Film Festival	Audentia Award	Évolution	Nominated
2016	Athens International Film Festival	Golden Athena - Best Picture	Évolution	Nominated
2016	Dublin Film Critics Circle Awards	DFCC - Best Director	Évolution	Nominated
2016	BloodGuts UK Horror Awards	Best International Film	Évolution	Nominated
2016	Titanic International Film Festival	Special Mention of the Jury	Évolution	Won
2018	London Film Festival	Best Short Film	De Natura	Nominated
2018	San Sebastián International Film Festival	Zabaltegi-Tabakalera Prize	De Natura	Nominated
2018	Stockholm International Film Festival	Best Short Film	De Natura	Nominated
2021	San Sebastián International Film Festival	Golden Seashell - Best Film	Earwig	Nominated
2021	San Sebastián International Film Festival	Special Prize of the Jury	Earwig	Won
2021	Toronto International Film Festival	Platform Prize	Earwig	Nominated
2022	Cleveland International Film Festival	Best Feature Film	Earwig	Nominated

== Filmography ==
=== As filmmaker ===
Year	Title	Credited as			Notes
Year	Title	Director	Writer	Editor	Notes
1987	La Première Mort de Nono	Yes	Yes	Yes	Short film
1996	La Bouche de Jean-Pierre	Yes	Yes	Yes	Short film
1998	Good Boys Use Condoms	Yes	Yes	No	Short film
2004	Innocence	Yes	Yes	No	Feature film
2009	Enter the Void	No	Yes	No	Directed by Gaspar Noé
2014	Nectar	Yes	Yes	No	Short film
2015	Evolution	Yes	Yes	No	Feature film
2018	De Natura	Yes	Yes	No	Short film
2021	Earwig	Yes	Yes	No	Feature film
2025	The Ice Tower	Yes	Yes	No	Feature film

Editor

Year	Title	Director	Notes
1986	Festin	Sylvain Ledey	Short film
1991	Horizons artificiels (Trois rêves d'architecture)	Alain Bourges	Documentary
1991	Carne	Gaspar Noé	Short film
1994	La Baigneuse	Joël Leberre	Short film
1994	L'Oeil du cyclone	Gaspar Noé	TV series; 1 episode
1997	Marquis de Slime	Quélou Parente	Short film
1998	I Stand Alone	Gaspar Noé	Feature film

Producer

Year	Title	Director	Notes
1991	Carne	Gaspar Noé	
1998	I Stand Alone	Gaspar Noé	
2019	Lux Æterna	Gaspar Noé	
2021	Vortex	Gaspar Noé	Co-producer

=== Acting roles ===
Year	Title	Role	Director	Notes
1989	Les cinéphiles - Le retour de Jean	Lucile	Louis Skorecki	Feature film
1989	Les cinéphiles 2 - Eric a disparu	Lucile	Louis Skorecki	Feature film
1991	Carne	L'infirmiere	Gaspar Noé	Short film
