= Deba Hekmat =

Iranian-British model, actress and writer

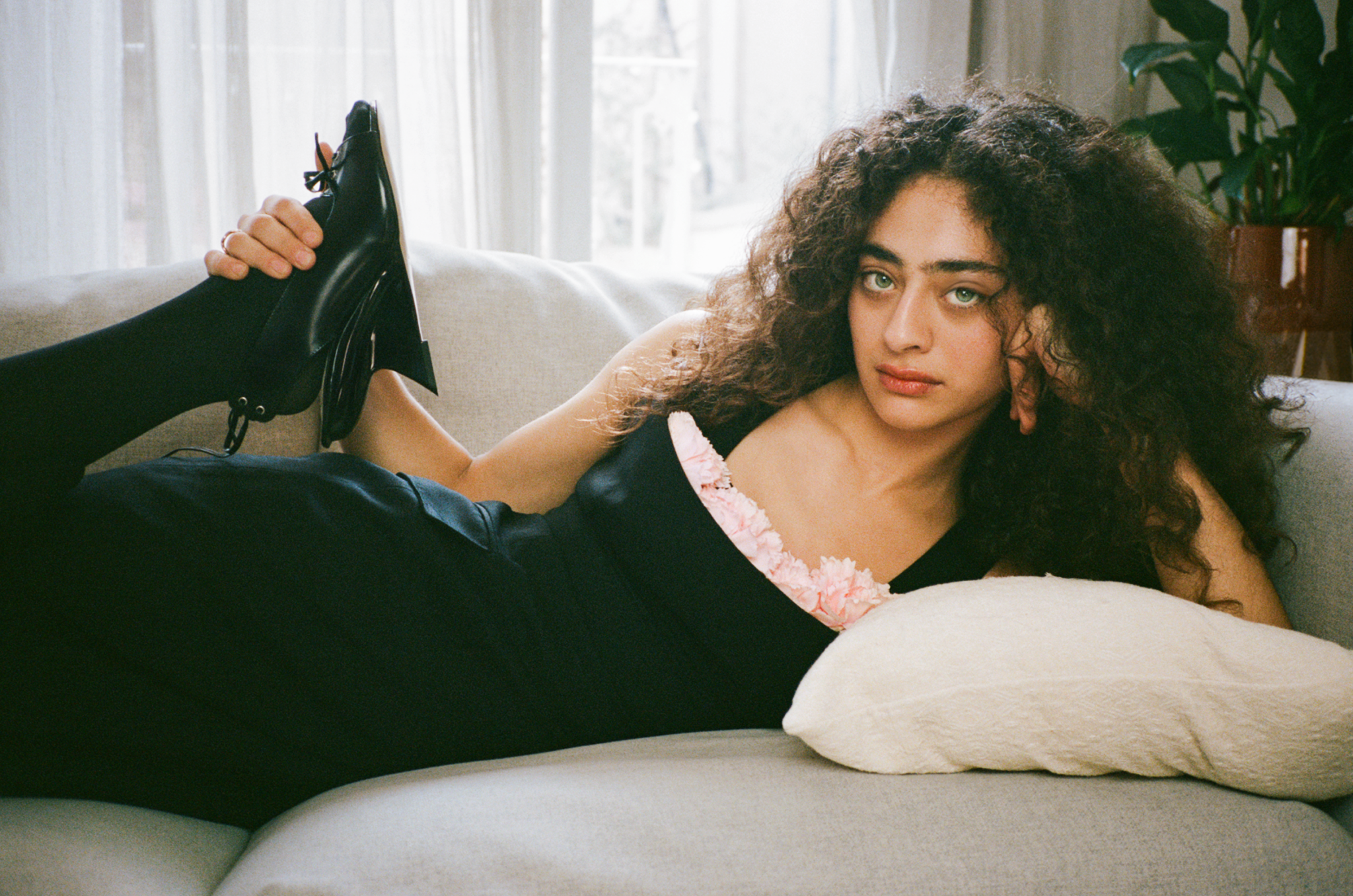
- Deba Hekmat
- Born: 14 November 2001 (age 24); Sardasht, Iran
- Occupations: Actress, model, writer
- Years active: 2018–present

Deba Hekmat (born 14 November 2001) is a British model, actress, and writer. She began her career in modeling before starring in the film Last Swim (2024).

== Early life ==
Hekmat was born in Sardasht, western Iran. She is Kurdish. In 2004, her family fled to the United Kingdom, where they settled in Croydon, South London. When Hekmat was 12, the family moved again to Cardiff. She left her sixth form college early and subsequently moved back to London.

== Career ==
=== Modelling ===
At the age of 16, while attending college and living with her father in London, Hekmat discovered the modeling agency Anti-Agency through Instagram. After submitting photos, she signed with the agency within a week. In 2018, she presented and appeared in videos for i-D and PAQ. Her other early work includes gigs with Cosmopolitan UK and walking the runway for Vivienne Westwood and Vetements. She starred in the Genesis II campaign for FootDistrict in 2020. In the early stages of her modeling career, she became known for her advocacy related to body image, particularly the normalization of body hair on women. In 2021, she discussed this subject in a BBC Sounds podcast episode titled Carefree Body Hair with Deba Hekmat, in which she framed body hair as something "for showing, not for shaving."

In 2021, Hekmat featured in W Magazine's "Punk Fashion Goes Pop" issue, led jeweler Loveness Lee's spring/summer 2021 campaign and a Mulberry bag campaign, and modeled the Lee x H&M collection. She also had gigs with the likes of Metal Magazine.

With musician Tom Austin (also known as Niko B), Hekmat collaborated on modeling projects and campaigns for Lucozade Sport and YOOX x Aries in 2022 and 2023. Hekmat represented the star sign Cancer for the astrology-themed campaign Heaven by Marc Jacobs and editorially featured on the cover of Exit's spring/summer 2022 issue.

=== Film and writing ===
Hekmat entered the film industry without formal acting training, and she had not worked in television or theatre prior to her debut. She made her feature film debut as Laraib in Luna Carmoon's Hoard, after being cast by a casting director who contacted her directly via Instagram. The film premiered at the 2023 Venice Film Festival. Hekmat then starred in the lead role of Ziba Soofi in Sasha Nathwani's Last Swim, which premiered at the 2024 Berlinale. She received acclaim for her performance. In April 2025, Hekmat signed with Olivia Bell Management.

Hekmat has contributed to publications such as The Basement and conducted an interview for the monograph Mia by Aries.

== Pledge ==
In September 2025, she signed an open pledge with Film Workers for Palestine pledging not to work with Israeli film institutions "that are implicated in genocide and apartheid against the Palestinian people."

== Filmography ==
| Year | Title | Role | Notes |
|---|---|---|---|
| 2023 | Hoard | Laraib | |
| 2024 | Last Swim | Ziba Soofi | |
| 2026 | Vote Gavin Lyle | Aisha | |

=== Music videos ===
- "Angel" (2020), Lava La Rue
