= Saura Lightfoot-Leon =

British actress (born 1998)

- Born: 24 April 1998 (age 28); Leiden, Netherlands
- Other name: Saura Lightfoot Leon
- Education: Royal Academy of Dramatic Art
- Occupation: Actress
- Years active: 2020–present

Saura Lightfoot-Leon (born 24 April 1998) is a British actress. For her debut feature film Hoard (2023), she received two British Independent Film Award nominations. She was named a 2024 Screen International Star of Tomorrow and a 2025 Brit to Watch by Variety.

== Early life ==
Lightfoot-Leon was born in Leiden, Netherlands to English father Paul Lightfoot and Spanish mother Sol León, both dancers and choreographers, and grew up in The Hague. Lightfoot-Leon graduated from the Royal Academy of Dramatic Art (RADA) in 2020 with a Bachelor of Arts (BA) in Acting.

== Career ==
As a child, Lightfoot-Leon appeared in the projected background videos of her parents' ballet and contemporary dance productions, such as Silent Screen (2005) and Stop-Motion (2014) at Lucent Danstheater in The Hague. Stop-Motion was also staged in 2018 at Sadler's Wells Theatre in London. Upon graduating from RADA in 2020, Lightfoot-Leon was also featured in their project with Nederlands Dans Theater (NDT), She Remembers, which was staged virtually.

Lightfoot-Leon's television debut was in an episode of the BBC One miniseries Life After Life in 2022. She made her feature film debut as Maria, the leading role in Luna Carmoon's film Hoard, co-starring Joseph Quinn and Hayley Squires. For her performance in Hoard, she was awarded a Special Jury Mention at the 80th Venice International Film Festival. She was nominated for the 2024 British Independent Film Award for Breakthrough Performance and jointly nominated for Best Joint Lead Performance with Quinn.

In 2024, Lightfoot-Leon had a major role in the Paramount+ series The Agency, playing CIA field officer Daniela Ruiz Morata. She also appeared in the Apple TV+ WWII drama series Masters of the Air and completed work on the Netflix limited series American Primeval, a period Western.

Lightfoot-Leon is set to portray Kick Kennedy in the Netflix series Kennedy.

== Filmography ==
Key
†	Denotes titles that have not yet been released

=== Film ===
Year	Title	Role	Notes
2020	Grapes	Rae	Short film
2020	Hard Pass		Short film
2023	Hoard	Maria	

=== Television ===
Year	Title	Role	Notes
2022	Life After Life	Hilde	1 episode
2024	Masters of the Air	Louise	2 episodes
2024–present	The Agency	Daniela Ruiz Morata	Main role
2025	American Primeval	Abish	6 episodes
TBA	Kennedy †	Kick Kennedy	Filming

== Stage ==
Year	Title	Role	Notes
2005	Silent Screen		
2014	Stop-Motion		Lucent Danstheater, The Hague
2020	She Remembers		Nederlands Dans Theater (virtual)

== Awards and nominations ==
Year	Award	Category	Work	Result	Ref.
2023	Venice International Film Critics Week	Special Jury Mention	Hoard	Won	
2024	British Independent Film Award	Best Joint Lead Performance	Hoard	Nominated	
2024	British Independent Film Award	Breakthrough Performance	Hoard	Nominated	
