= Olivier M. Herter =

Dutch-German writer

Olivier M. Herter (10 October 1995) is a Dutch and German writer, playwright, artist and actor. He is known as the writer of the award-winning opera film Songs for a Passerby. His body of work consists of plays, poems, scenarios, librettos, and performances. Translations of his work were published in multiple languages.

== Early life and education ==
From 2016 until 2020 he received his professional education as an actor at the Institute of Performative Arts in Maastricht. In this period in time, he also played a few smaller roles in short and feature films in The Netherlands. During his studies Herter performed performances and recitals of his writings throughout Flanders and The Netherlands.

== Career ==
In 2019, Herter wrote the libretto of The Opera of the Falling. This virtual reality opera was part of exhibitions at Eye Film Institute and Staatsschauspiel Dresden, among others. In 2020, Herter was artist in residence at leading night club and cultural venue De School, in Amsterdam.

In 2023, Herter wrote the virtual reality opera film Songs for a Passerby, directed by Celine Daemen. The film premiered at the 80th Venice International Film Festival, where it won the Venice Immersive Grand Prize, the first prize of the extended reality section of the Venice Biennale. The Dutch première of the piece was in September 2023, in Muziekgebouw Amsterdam.

== Awards ==
Year	Award	Category	Recipient	Result
2023	Venice Film Festival	Venice Immersive Grand Prize	Songs for a Passerby	Won
