= Hoard (film) =

2023 film by Luna Carmoon

- Theatrical release poster
- Directed by: Luna Carmoon
- Written by: Luna Carmoon
- Produced by: Loran Dunn; Helen Simmons; Andrew Starke
- Starring: Saura Lightfoot-Leon; Hayley Squires; Joseph Quinn; Lily-Beau Leach; Deba Hekmat; Samantha Spiro; Cathy Tyson
- Cinematography: Nanu Segal
- Edited by: Rachel Durance
- Music by: Jim Williams
- Production companies: BFI; BBC Film; Anti-Worlds; Delaval Film; Erebus Pictures
- Distributed by: Vertigo Releasing
- Release dates: 2 September 2023 (Venice); 17 May 2024 (United Kingdom and Ireland)
- Running time: 126 minutes
- Country: United Kingdom
- Language: English
- Box office: $88,244

Hoard is a 2023 British coming-of-age drama film written and directed by Luna Carmoon in her feature directorial debut. It stars Saura Lightfoot-Leon, Hayley Squires, Joseph Quinn, Lily-Beau Leach, Deba Hekmat, Samantha Spiro, and Cathy Tyson. It follows a teenager whose mother used to be an obsessive hoarder as she journeys through childhood trauma and emerging sexuality.

The film had its world premiere at the 80th Venice International Film Festival on 2 September 2023, where it won three prizes. It was theatrically released in the United Kingdom and Ireland on 17 May 2024, by Vertigo Releasing. It received positive reviews from critics, who praised Carmoon's direction and the performances of the cast. Carmoon was nominated for the European Discovery at the 37th European Film Awards and for Outstanding Debut by a British Writer, Director or Producer at the 78th British Academy Film Awards.

== Plot summary ==
8-year-old Maria lives with her mother, Cynthia, who is a hoarder. Although Cynthia is loving and affectionate, their house is filthy and rat-infested, and Cynthia becomes upset if Maria doesn't save the day's rubbish and bring it home to her. Cynthia often repeats aphorisms and rhymes, encouraging Maria to do the same, and describes her hoarded items as her and Maria's 'catalogue of love'. At Christmas, Maria goes out at night and a man flashes her. Later, one of Cynthia's stacks of hoarded items collapses, severely injuring her. Maria is placed in foster care.

Ten years later, in 1994, an 18-year-old Maria still lives with her foster mother, Michelle. Another of Michelle's former charges, the older Michael, aged 30, comes to stay with them temporarily while he searches for a house with his girlfriend. Cynthia's ashes are delivered to Maria, the courier advising that cremated remains are only delivered within two weeks of death; meaning that Cynthia only recently passed. The same day, Maria's childhood best friend, Laraib, is forced by her family to move away due to rebellious behavior.

Maria and Michael become close and form a strange, intense physical relationship, often built out of daring one another to go further. They eat ashes and Maria masturbates on Michael's back. Michael's girlfriend visits one day, and Maria finds out she is pregnant. Her encounters with Michael continue to escalate, and Maria asks Michael to burn her stomach with an iron, something that happened to her as a child. Maria has recurring flashbacks to her life with Cynthia and hallucinates herself and Michael repeating Cynthia's rhymes. She flashes a wino on a railway bridge and when he laughs at her, she steals his toy drum.

Maria begins to hoard garbage and increasingly neglects her physical hygiene. When she wanders outside during the night and comes home with chilblains, Michael tenderly cares for her, and they have sex. The next morning, Michael's girlfriend Leah visits; Maria discovers he proposed to her the day before. That night, Michael and Maria encounter a woman who has been seriously injured in a hit-and-run; she dies as Maria waits for Michael to get help, and Maria places coins over her eyes, walks away and climbs into a large rubbish bin.

The next day, a barefoot, filthy Maria returns home. Locked in her room, which is revealed to be filled with hoarded trash, Maria imagines herself and Cynthia happy together in their house. Leah arrives to confront Michael, who has broken up with her via a voicemail. Michael breaks into Maria's room and begs her to love him, but Maria finally rejects him and Michelle, learning the truth of their relationship, asks him to leave. As Michael and Leah leave together, Maria gifts her with a trinket, advising her to never leave her daughter.

Michelle helps Maria throw away her hoard, and Laraib returns home. On New Year's Eve, Maria sneaks into a tip, where she sits atop a pile of rubbish to watch fireworks. In a voiceover, she tells Cynthia she loves her and says the 'catalogue of love' has returned to her.

== Cast ==
- Saura Lightfoot Leon as Maria
  - Lily-Beau Leach as young Maria
- Hayley Squires as Cynthia, Maria's mother
- Joseph Quinn as Michael, one of Michelle's former foster children
- Deba Hekmat as Laraib, Maria's school friend
- Samantha Spiro as Michelle, Maria's foster mother
- Cathy Tyson as Sam
- Nabil Elouahabi as Ali
- Sandra Hale as Janice
- Alexis Tuttle as Mrs Norwood

== Production ==
The film was produced by Delaval Film, Erebus Pictures, Anti-Worlds with producers Loran Dunn, Helen Simmons and Andy Starke. It was backed by the British Film Institute (BFI) and BBC Film.

Casting was revealed in April 2022 with Saura Lightfoot Leon, Deba Hekmat, Hayley Squires, Joseph Quinn and Lily-Beau Leach in the lead roles.

Principal photography took place in South-East London and was completed by May 2022.

== Release ==
Hoard was first shown at the BFI London Film Festival Works-in-Progress showcase in October 2022. It had its world premiere at the 80th Venice International Film Festival on 2 September 2023. The film had a UK premiere date of 9 October 2023, again at the BFI London Film Festival. It was theatrically released in the UK and Ireland on 17 May 2024. In April 2024, Sunrise Films acquired distribution rights for the United States and Canada, where it was scheduled for release on 6 September 2024.

== Reception ==
On the review aggregator website Rotten Tomatoes, 94% of 47 critics' reviews are positive, with an average rating of 7.3/10. Metacritic, which uses a weighted average, assigned the film a score of 73 out of 100, based on 8 critics, indicating "generally favorable" reviews.

Peter Bradshaw in The Guardian gave the film four stars out of five, describing a "deeply strange and emotionally extravagant story" with "a lot of storytelling substance. Hoard isn’t perfect but its pure vehemence and the commitment of its performances are arresting". Ed Potton in The Times compared the filmmaking to Andrea Arnold and Andrew Birkin but said that "Carmoon is very much her own film-maker" and praised Lightfoot Leon's performance, saying she was "a leading lady with animalistic, inhibited presence". The film also received four stars out of five from Sophie Monks Kauffman in Time Out who called it a "visceral debut" which "defies simple interpretations" and made mention of cinematographer Nanu Segal’s handheld camerawork which "captures the fearless Lightfoot Leon".

=== Accolades ===
Carmoon was nominated for Best Directing Debut and Squires, Lightloot Leon and Quinn all received acting nominations at the British Independent Film Awards in November 2024.

Award	Date of ceremony	Category	Recipient(s)	Result	Ref.
Venice Film Festival	9 September 2023	Venice International Critics' Week – Grand Prize	Luna Carmoon	Nominated	
Venice Film Festival	9 September 2023	The Film Club Audience Award	Luna Carmoon	Won	
Venice Film Festival	9 September 2023	Verona Film Club Award	Luna Carmoon	Won	
Venice Film Festival	9 September 2023	Authors Under 40 Award – Best Directing and Screenwriting	Luna Carmoon	Won	
Venice Film Festival	9 September 2023	Venice International Critics' Week – Jury Special Mention	Saura Lightfoot Leon	Won	
London Film Festival	15 October 2023	Sutherland Award for Best First Feature	Hoard	Nominated	
Valladolid International Film Festival	28 October 2023	Punto de Encuentro Award	Hoard	Nominated	
New Horizons Film Festival	27 July 2024	The Audience Award	Hoard	Won	
European Film Awards	7 December 2024	European Discovery – Prix FIPRESCI	Hoard	Nominated	
British Independent Film Awards	8 December 2024	Best Supporting Performance	Hayley Squires	Nominated	
British Independent Film Awards	8 December 2024	Best Joint Lead Performance	Joseph Quinn and Saura Lightfoot-Leon	Nominated	
British Independent Film Awards	8 December 2024	Breakthrough Performance	Saura Lightfoot-Leon	Nominated	
British Independent Film Awards	8 December 2024	Best Casting	Heather Basten	Nominated	
British Independent Film Awards	8 December 2024	Best Production Design	Bobbie Cousins	Nominated	
British Independent Film Awards	8 December 2024	Douglas Hickox Award (Best Debut Director)	Luna Carmoon	Nominated	
