= Hot Property (film) =

- Directed by: Max McGill
- Written by: Max McGill, Andrew Cryan
- Story by: Max McGill, Andrew Cryan
- Produced by: Campbell Beaton, Tiernan Hanby
- Starring: MyAnna Buring; Tom Rhys Harries; Ella Smith; Sam Phillips; Kate Bracken
- Cinematography: Mattias Nyberg
- Edited by: Joe Parsons
- Release date: 1 May 2016 (LOCO London Comedy Film Festival)
- Running time: 90 minutes
- Country: United Kingdom

Hot Property is a 2016 British comedy co-written and directed by Max McGill, starring MyAnna Buring and produced by Campbell Beaton. This is the first film by writer/director, Max McGill.

== Plot ==
Melody Munro (MyAnna Buring) is a corporate spy and professional identity thief who is subsidising her lavish lifestyle by embezzling from her employer. When she is caught and fired by her employer, she finds herself facing eviction, but calls upon her spy skills to defend her home.
