= Making Of (2023 film) =

2023 film by Cédric Kahn

Making of
- Theatrical release poster
- Directed by: Cédric Kahn
- Written by: Fanny Burdino; Samuel Doux; Cédric Kahn
- Produced by: Olivier Delbosc
- Starring: Denis Podalydès; Jonathan Cohen; Stefan Crepon; Souheila Yacoub; Emmanuelle Bercot; Xavier Beauvois; Valérie Donzelli
- Cinematography: Patrick Ghiringhelli
- Edited by: Yann Dedet
- Production companies: Curiosa Films; France 2 Cinéma; Tropdebonheur Productions; Umedia Production
- Distributed by: Ad Vitam
- Release dates: 4 September 2023 (Venice); 10 January 2024 (France)
- Running time: 119 minutes
- Country: France
- Language: French
- Budget: €3,750,000
- Box office: €1,402,000

Making of is a 2023 French drama film co-written and directed by Cédric Kahn. It premiered out of competition at the 80th Venice International Film Festival. It was released in France on 10 January 2024.

== Plot ==
Simon, a film director, has just started filming his next movie about the struggle of a group of workers who want to avoid the closure of the factory in which they work at all costs. The filming quickly became complicated with the arrival of serious financial problems: two of the co-producers realized that the script on the basis of which they had given their agreement was not the final script. They want the film to have a positive ending, with the workers managing to take back the factory thanks to a SCOP, when the scenario actually predicts that the workers lose their fight. Simon refuses outright, and the co-producers withdraw from the project, which seriously unbalances the film's budget.

The producer, Marquez, leaves for Paris to seek new financing. On the set itself, the situation is complicated. Alain, the actor who plays the main role, keeps suggesting changes to the script which all have the effect of highlighting his character, while reducing the role of Nadia, an actress who has just landed her first major role. Simon must manage multiple conflicts within the team. He also has marital problems, his wife wants them to separate.

One of the extras, Joseph, dreams of becoming a director and has great admiration for Simon. He shyly hands him a script he wrote in the hope that he will want to give him his opinion. Joseph works in the family pizzeria with his sister, but dreams of cinema. Simon then gives him a camera and asks him to make a making-of, a logbook of the film.

Marquez regularly reports on his efforts to seek new funding to Simon, he is optimistic about his chances of success. With Viviane, his production director, Simon nevertheless tries to reduce filming costs. Joseph bonds with Nadia, they kiss. Nadia confides to him that she is in a relationship, but wants to leave her boyfriend.

Marquez finally had to admit that he had not found any financing for the film, and there was no money left at all. Viviane and Simon therefore bring together the entire team to tell them that filming must be interrupted, unless they agree to work voluntarily. This causes disagreements among them, some accepting, others categorically refusing to work without being paid. This echoes the scene they have just shot, in which the workers are informed that they could be offered a bonus of 100,000 euros if they give up their fight, and are very divided between those for whom this is a godsend and those who refuse to give up the fight.

Simon decides to make a quick return trip to see his family. He leaves, accompanied by Jules, one of the extras. Simon tells his wife that he has decided to agree to change the ending of his film to solve his budget problems. During a stop on the way back, he felt unwell and lost consciousness.

It's the last day of filming, and the ending is not happy: the workers have lost, the factory is going to be moved to Poland, but they sabotage the machine before being arrested by the police. Everyone is delighted to have completed this shoot. Following his illness, Simon remained hospitalized for two weeks, and Marquez took advantage of the compensation paid by the insurance to finance the end of filming.

== Cast ==
- Denis Podalydès as Simon
- Jonathan Cohen as Alain / Jim
- Stefan Crepon as Joseph
- Souheila Yacoub as Nadia / Oudia
- Emmanuelle Bercot as Viviane
- Xavier Beauvois as Marquez
- Valérie Donzelli as Alice
- Riad Gahmi as Jeff
- Thaïs Vauquières as Cathy
- Orlando Vauthier as Jules
- Johanna Colboc as script supervisor
- Thomas Silberstein as first assistant director
- Antoine Berry Roger as grip
- David Olivier Fischer as sound mixer
- Matilda Kime as cinematographer
- Romaric Thomas as régisseur
- Damien Rondeau as set designer

== Production ==
The film's screenplay was written by Cédric Kahn, Fanny Burdino and Samuel Doux. Making of was produced by Olivier Delbosc through his company Curiosa Films, in co-production with France 2 Cinéma, Cédric Kahn's company Tropdebonheur Productions, and Umedia Production.

Principal photography began on 14 January 2022 in the Île-de-France region, and was projected to conclude on 28 February.

== Release ==
Making of was selected to be screened out of competition at the 80th Venice International Film Festival, where it had its world premiere on 30 August 2023. The film was released in France on 10 January 2024 by Ad Vitam.

== Reception ==
On the review aggregator website Rotten Tomatoes, the film holds an approval rating of 60% based on 5 reviews, with an average rating of 4.5/10.
