= De School =

Club and entertainment complex in the Netherlands

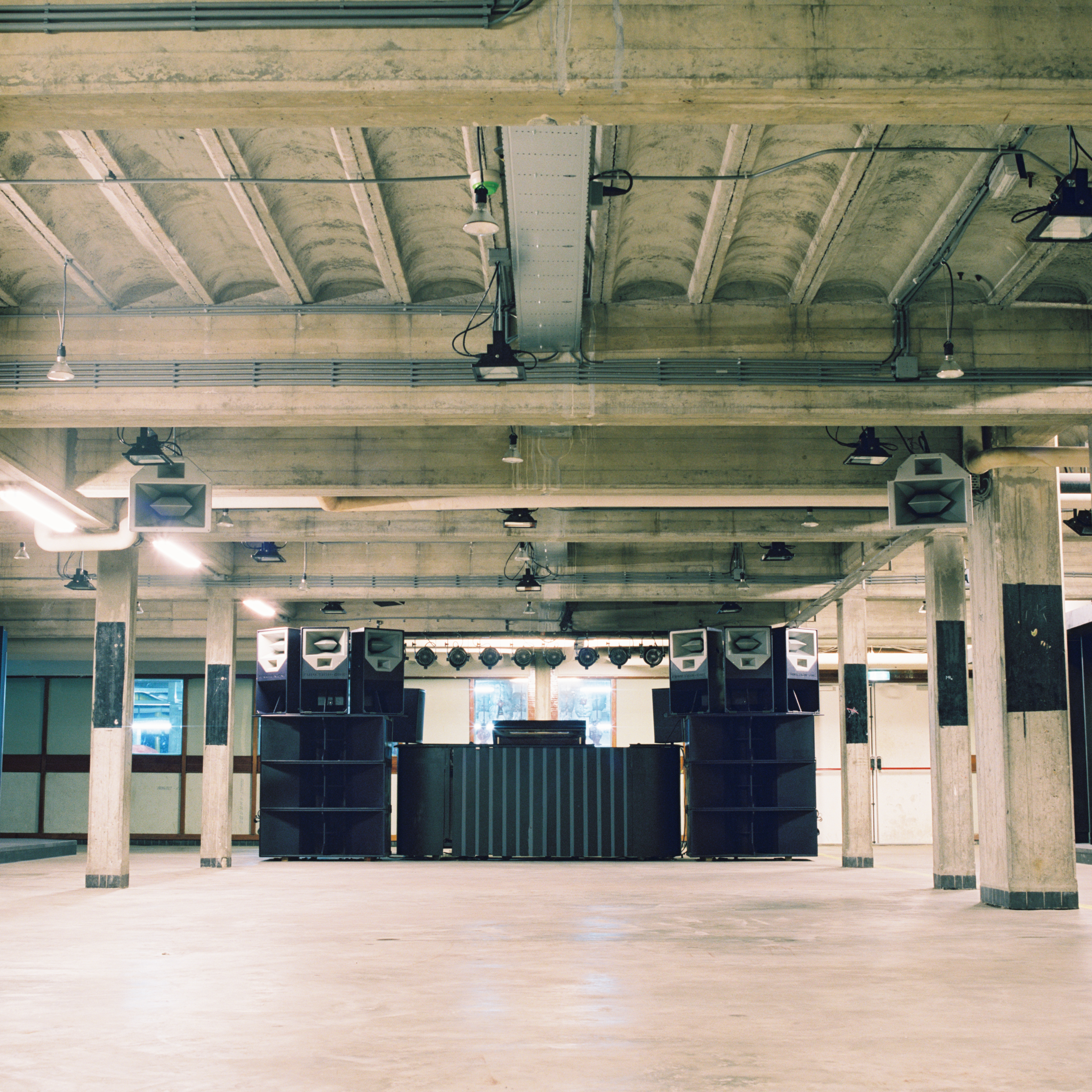
De School Dancefloor

De School was a leading club and cultural venue located in the western part of Amsterdam. The club was situated on the Dr. Jan van Breemenstraat in the building of a former technical high school.

From the opening in 2016 until the definite closing in January 2024, De School was a leading club and cultural venue in The Netherlands. Its reputation was renowned internationally.

== History ==
The club and cultural venue was founded in 2016 by Post CS BV, the company also responsible for the since-closed nightclub Trouw. The complex consisted of a nightclub, concert venue, restaurant, cafe, gallery space, artist residency and gym. The nightclub of De School, located in the former school's bicycle storage basement, had a capacity of 700 and a 24-hour license. The complex additionally served as the headquarters of Subbacultcha, a local art magazine and music platform. The program of Subbacultcha took place in the venue’s s105 room.

The club was temporarily closed in 2020 amidst the COVID-19 pandemic and opened again in September 2022. In January 2024, the club closed indefinitely, due to expiring municipal permits and building plans on site. The final party, running from January 12th through 15th, was a marathon event called Het Einde.

== Reputation ==
The club earned a reputation in the international electronic music for their entrance policy, sound system and community.

In 2020, DJ Magazine announced De School to be the 39th club on the list of top 100 clubs worldwide. In that same year, writer and performer Olivier Herter was artist in residence at the venue. The club has hosted artists such as DJ Sprinkles, Theo Parrish, Cinnaman, Wata Igarashi, and I-F.
