= The Salt of Tears =

2020 film

- French: Le Sel des larmes
- Directed by: Philippe Garrel
- Written by: Philippe Garrel; Jean-Claude Carrière; Arlette Langmann
- Produced by: Edouard Weil
- Starring: Logann Antuofermo; Oulaya Amamra; Louise Chevillotte; Souheila Yacoub; André Wilms
- Cinematography: Renato Berta
- Edited by: François Gédigier
- Music by: Jean-Louis Aubert
- Production company: Rectangle Productions
- Distributed by: Ad Vitam
- Release date: 22 February 2020 (Berlinale)
- Running time: 100 minutes
- Countries: France; Switzerland
- Language: French

The Salt of Tears (French: Le Sel des larmes) is a 2020 black-and-white drama film directed by Philippe Garrel. It stars Logann Antuofermo, Oulaya Amamra, Louise Chevillotte, Souheila Yacoub, and André Wilms. It tells the story of a young man who falls in love with three women. The film had its world premiere in the Competition section at the 70th Berlin International Film Festival on 22 February 2020. The film was a nominee for the Zabaltegi-Tabakalera Prize at the San Sebastián International Film Festival in 2020, as well as the New York Film Festival. It was also an official selection at the Buenos Aires International Festival of Independent Cinema in 2021.

== Premise ==
An aspiring carpenter Luc travels to Paris to take the examination for École Boulle, a prestigious joinery school. He has a brief relationship with Djemila. Subsequently, he goes back to his rural hometown, where he lives with his father. Luc sleeps with his former girlfriend Geneviève. He moves to Paris and falls in love with another woman, a nurse named Betsy.

== Cast ==
- Logann Antuofermo as Luc
- Oulaya Amamra as Djemila
- Louise Chevillotte as Geneviève
- Souheila Yacoub as Betsy
- André Wilms as Luc's father
- Martin Mesnier as Paco
- Teddy Chawa as Jean-René
- Aline Belibi as Alice

== Production ==
The film was co-written by Philippe Garrel with his longtime collaborators Arlette Langmann and Jean-Claude Carrière. Principal photography began on 2 April 2019.

It was shot on 35mm film by cinematographer Renato Berta.

== Release ==
The film had its world premiere in the Competition section at the 70th Berlin International Film Festival on 22 February 2020. It was originally scheduled to be released in France on 8 April 2020, but it was then delayed to 14 October 2020 due to the COVID-19 pandemic. The film was then removed from the release calendar.

== Reception ==
=== Box Office ===
On opening day The film made $32,908, showing in 65 theaters across Paris. The film would go on to eventually reach 77 theaters, and gross $83,516 domestically, and $89,465 internationally. Notably, the film would also later be released in Portugal, to an opening of $1,549, and a gross of $5,949.

=== Critical Response ===
On review aggregator website Rotten Tomatoes, the film holds an approval rating of 64% based on 22 reviews, with an average of 5.3/10. On Metacritic, the film has a weighted average score of 62 out of 100, based on 11 critics, indicating "generally favorable reviews".

Eric Kohn of IndieWire gave the film a grade of B, commenting that "there's an undeniable allure to the way the movie hovers in an ambiguous space between Luc's passions and their problematic connotations." Peter Bradshaw of The Guardian gave the film 3 out of 5 stars, writing, "It is a watchable, insouciant love story with some great incidental performances, although there is a sense of the shark being jumped 30 minutes from the end." Boyd van Hoeij of The Hollywood Reporter wrote, "Though set in the present, the grainy black-and-white images and [Jean-Louis] Aubert's familiar-sounding, piano-led score again lend the story something timeless." Meanwhile, Diego Semerene of Slant Magazine gave the film 1.5 out of 4 stars, writing, "[Philippe] Garrel illustrates the absurdity behind the myth of the complementary couple with the same cynicism that permeates his previous work but none of the humor or wit." Guy Lodge of Variety wrote, "A minor romantic roundelay that deviates little from the essential template of his last three films, it's very much the work of an artist less preoccupied with innovation than with signature craftsmanship."
