= Dario Argento Panico =

2023 French documentary film

- Film poster
- Directed by: Simone Scafidi
- Written by: Simone Scafidi; Manlio Gomarasca; Davide Pulici
- Produced by: Giada Mazzoleni; Daniele Bolcato
- Cinematography: Patrizio Saccò
- Edited by: Claudio Rossoni
- Music by: Alessandro Baldessari
- Release date: 6 September 2023 (Venice)
- Running time: 98 minutes
- Countries: Italy; United Kingdom
- Languages: Italian; Spanish; English; French

Dario Argento Panico (also spelled Dario Argento: Panico) is a 2023 Italian-British documentary film co-written and directed by Simone Scafidi. It premiered out of competition at the 80th edition of the Venice Film Festival.

== Synopsis ==
The film focuses on Dario Argento's works as well as on his personal life. Interviewees include Argento's family, including his daughters Fiore and Asia and his first wife Marisa Casale, Argento's longtime collaborators such as Michele Soavi, Lamberto Bava, Luigi Cozzi, Franco Ferrini and Goblin's Claudio Simonetti, and directors who were influenced by his works, namely Guillermo del Toro, Nicolas Winding Refn and Gaspar Noé.

== Release ==
The film had its world premiere at the 80th Venice International Film Festival in the Venice Classics sidebar. It was released on Shudder on 2 February 2024.

== Reception ==
On the review aggregator website Rotten Tomatoes, 100% of 18 critics' reviews are positive. Metacritic, which uses a weighted average, assigned the film a score of 65 out of 100, based on five critics, indicating "generally favorable" reviews.
