= The Summer with Carmen =

2023 film by Zacharías Mavroidís

- Theatrical release poster
- Greek: Το Καλοκαίρι της Κάρμεν
- Directed by: Zacharías Mavroidís
- Written by: Zacharías Mavroidís; Xenofón Chalátsis
- Produced by: Ioánna Bolomýti
- Starring: Yorgos Tsiantoulas; Andreas Lampropoulos; Nikolas Mihas; Vasilis Tsigristaris; Roubini Vasilakopoulou
- Cinematography: Theódoros Michópoulos
- Edited by: Lívia Neroutsopoúlou
- Music by: Ted Regklis
- Production companies: Atalante Productions; Argonauts Productions; ERT; Athens Productions
- Distributed by: Cinobo
- Release dates: 7 September 2023 (Venice); 13 June 2024 (Greece)
- Running time: 106 minutes
- Country: Greece
- Language: Greek

The Summer with Carmen (Greek: Το Καλοκαίρι της Κάρμεν, romanized: To Kalokairi tis Karmen) is a 2023 Greek comedy-drama film co-written and directed by Zacharías Mavroidís. It follows two close gay friends, Demosthenes (Yorgos Tsiantoulas) and Nikitas (Andreas Lampropoulos), attempting to write a screenplay for a feature film, during a hot summer in Athens.

The film had its world premiere in the Giornate degli Autori section of the 80th Venice International Film Festival on 7 September 2023. It was theatrically released in Greece on 13 June 2024 by Cinobo.

== Plot ==
Demosthenes is enjoying a beautiful day at the queer beach in Athens. He is helping his friend and aspiring filmmaker Nikitas come up with an idea for his first feature film, inspired by the tribulations of a rescue dog named Karmen. Two summers earlier, Demosthenes had to stop in Athens for the Summer because of his father's health problems. An excuse to meet Panos, his ex who has rescued a dog, Karmen. Panos regrets taking in the dog, just as Demosthenes seems to regret breaking up with Panos, so Demosthenes takes over the dog's care and everyone in his life seems to project their unspoken emotions into the little dog.

Committed to transforming their anecdotes into "the hero's journey", consulting a script-writing book Nikitas found, the two friends begin to question the main rule of screenplay theory — the hero changes — and in the process give a twist to their enduring friendship.

== Cast ==
- Yorgos Tsiantoulas as Demosthenes
- Andreas Lampropoulos as Nikitas
- Nikolas Mihas as Panos
- Roubini Vasilakopoulou as Kaiti
- Vasilis Tsigristaris as Thymios

== Production ==
Mavroidís co-wrote the film with his best friend Xenofondas Chalatsis. He described it as "a comedy about the futility of knowing thyself", and mentioned Charlie Kaufman as an inspiration for the film's structure. The film was shot in Athens and the nudist beach of Limanákia in Vouliagmeni.

== Release ==
The Summer with Carmen premiered in the Giornate degli Autori section of the 80th Venice International Film Festival on 7 September 2023. The film had its North American premiere at the AFI Fest on 29 October 2023. It was later screened at the Thessaloniki International Film Festival, where it won the Mermaid Award, the Youth Jury Best Film Award and the Fischer Audience Award for a Greek film. The film was released theatrically in Greece on 13 June 2024 by Cinobo. In the United Kingdom, it was released theatrically on 28 February 2025 by Peccadillo Pictures.

== Reception ==
On the review aggregator website Rotten Tomatoes, 89% of 18 critics' reviews are positive, with an average rating of 7/10.
