= Climax (2018 film) =

2018 film by Gaspar Noé

- French theatrical release poster
- Directed by: Gaspar Noé
- Written by: Gaspar Noé
- Produced by: Edouard Weil; Vincent Maraval; Brahim Chioua
- Starring: Sofia Boutella; Kiddy Smile; Romain Guillermic; Souheila Yacoub; Claude Gajan Maull; Giselle Palmer; Taylor Kastle; Thea Carla Schøtt
- Cinematography: Benoît Debie
- Edited by: Denis Bedlow; Gaspar Noé
- Music by: Thomas Bangalter
- Production companies: Rectangle Productions; Wild Bunch; Les Cinemas de la Zone; Eskwad; KNM; Arte France Cinéma; Artémis Productions
- Distributed by: O'Brother Distribution (Belgium); Wild Bunch (France)
- Release dates: 13 May 2018 (Cannes); 19 September 2018 (France); 21 November 2018 (Belgium)
- Running time: 96 minutes
- Countries: Belgium; France
- Languages: French; English
- Budget: $2.9 million
- Box office: $1.7 million

Climax is a 2018 experimental psychological horror film directed, written and co-edited by Gaspar Noé. Featuring an ensemble cast of 24 actors, led by Sofia Boutella, the plot is set in 1996 and follows a French dance troupe holding a days-long rehearsal in an abandoned school; the final night of rehearsing is a success, but the group's celebratory after-party takes a dark turn when the communal bowl of sangria is spiked with LSD, sending each of the dancers into agitated, confused and psychotic states.

The film is notable for its unorthodox production, having been conceived and pre-produced in four weeks and shot in chronological order in only 15 days: although Noé conceived the premise, the bulk of the film was unrehearsed on-the-spot improvisation by the cast, who were provided no lines of dialogue beforehand and had almost complete liberty as to where to take the story and characters. Climax features unusual editing and cinematography choices, and includes several long takes, including one lasting over 42 minutes. The cast of the film consists almost exclusively of dancers who, aside from Boutella and Souheila Yacoub, had no previous acting experience.

Climax premiered on 10 May 2018 in the Directors' Fortnight section of the Cannes Film Festival, where it won the Art Cinema Award. It was released theatrically in France on 19 September 2018 by Wild Bunch and in Belgium on 21 November 2018 by O'Brother Distribution. The film received positive reviews, with much praise for its direction, cinematography, soundtrack, choreography and performances.

== Plot ==
In the winter of 1996, a professional French dance troupe, led by manager Emmanuelle and choreographer Selva, rehearse an upcoming performance in an abandoned school. After completing the elaborate closing piece of the dance, the group commence a celebratory after-party, dancing and drinking sangria made by Emmanuelle, while DJ Daddy provides music.

As the party progresses, the dancers become increasingly agitated and confused, eventually concluding that the sangria has been spiked with a hallucinogen, presumably LSD. They initially accuse Emmanuelle since she made the drink, but she points out that she drank it too and is also suffering from its effects. Taylor, already resentful towards Omar for dating his sister Gazelle, proclaims that Omar is the only one who has not had the sangria, since he does not drink alcohol for religious reasons, causing the rest of the group to throw Omar out into the snowstorm.

Emmanuelle finds her young son, Tito, drinking the sangria and locks him inside an electrical room to protect him from the dancers. Selva goes to the room of her friend Lou, who confesses that she did not drink because she is pregnant. A drug-addled Dom enters the room, accuses Lou of spiking the drink and kicks her repeatedly in the stomach, not believing she is pregnant. In the kitchen, Alaïa catches Jennifer snorting cocaine, despite earlier telling Alaïa that she had none, which causes Alaïa to angrily push Jennifer into a portable stove, setting her hair on fire.

A frenzied Lou confronts Dom on the dance floor, but the others also accuse Lou of having spiked the drink. At first taking up a knife to defend herself, the taunts of the group cause Lou to have a breakdown, and she punches herself in the stomach and slashes herself with the knife on her face and arm as the group encourages her to kill herself, before being comforted by Eva.

Selva, hearing screams, finds Emmanuelle, who has lost the key to the electrical room in which Tito is locked and is screaming for help due to hallucinations. While Emmanuelle desperately searches for the key, Selva witnesses Taylor and a group brutally beating David, who has spent the night talking about having sex with all the women in the group. When the school suddenly loses electricity and switches to red emergency lighting, someone laughingly shouts that Tito has electrocuted himself.

In a shower, Eva desperately tries to wash off the blood from Lou's cuts. Ivana drags Selva to her room, where they kiss and start having sex. David enters and tries to drag out Selva, who pushes him out and locks the door. David is also turned away by Daddy, who is comforting Riley who has been repeatedly rejected by David throughout the evening. David then catches Taylor having incestuous sex with Gazelle in a bathroom. Gazelle flees and stumbles into the central hall, where the remaining dancers have descended into drug-induced psychosis, dancing wildly, having sex, or physically assaulting one another. Taylor catches up to Gazelle and professes his love to her, as she sobs and suffers a seizure on the floor. Taylor takes her to his room while David is attacked by another dancer who slams his head against the floor.

When police arrive the next morning, they find almost all of the dancers either unconscious or dead. Ivana's girlfriend Psyché continues to dance alone. Dom is curled up alone, sobbing. Jennifer is splashing water on her burned scalp, screaming. Tito's corpse lies beside the open door of the electrical junction cabinet. Emmanuelle has killed herself outside the electrical room out of grief. Lou exits the building and writhes outside in the snow, laughing uncontrollably. Omar has frozen to death in the snow. Eva is curled up naked in the shower cubicle. Daddy cradles Riley in his bed. Gazelle wakes up next to Taylor, who instructs her not to say anything to their father. Ivana and Selva are asleep, cuddling. Psyché, who has several books related to hallucinogens in her bag, goes to her room and drops liquid LSD into her eye.

== Cast ==
- Sofia Boutella as Selva
- Romain Guillermic as David
- Souheila Yacoub as Lou
- Kiddy Smile as Daddy
- Claude Gajan Maull as Emmanuelle
- Giselle Palmer as Gazelle
- Taylor Kastle as Taylor
- Thea Carla Schøtt as Psyché
- Sharleen Temple as Ivana
- Léa Vlamos as Eva
- Alaïa Alsafir as Alaïa
- Kendall Mugler as Rocket
- Lakdhar Dridi as Riley
- Adrien Sissoko as Omar
- Mamadou Bathily as Bart
- Alou Sidibe as Kyrra
- Ashley Biscette as Shirley
- Mounia Nassangar as Dom
- Tiphanie Au as Sila
- Sarah Belala as Jennifer
- Alexandre Moreau as Cyborg
- Naab as Rocco
- Strauss Serpent as Serpent
- Vince Galliot Cumant as Tito

== Production ==
=== Development ===
The film is loosely based on the true story of a French dance troupe in the 1990s who had their alcoholic beverage spiked with LSD at an after-party; no further incidents took place during the actual event, unlike in the film. The idea of making a film based around dance came to Noé in late November/December 2017, when he was invited to a vogue ballroom by Léa Vlamos (who would eventually be a part of the film's cast): "I couldn't believe the energy and the crowd – and then I thought, I'd love to film these kind of people. I'd also seen that movie by David LaChapelle called Rize, about krumping. I was amazed by these young kids dancing like they were possessed by evil forces." Although he originally felt inspired to make a documentary film about dance, he came up with the idea of Climax in early January 2018. He used 1970s films for additional inspiration, including The Towering Inferno, The Poseidon Adventure and Shivers.

He stated that the film was "all about people creating something together, and failing in the second half. It's like the [biblical] story of the Tower of Babel. Mankind can create big things. And then with the influence of alcohol, or some accident, everything falls. [...] I remember as a teenager when I was 14, I would host parties at my home. And I liked sangria, it was the first alcohol I ever drank. But you seriously don't need drugs to lose control, alcohol is more than enough. I've seen so many more fights linked to alcohol – it can turn you crazy." In another interview, he claimed that the theme of the film was "a group [of] people creating something together and then collapsing." Noé, who had experience using LSD, claimed that the film was more about the impact fear can have on people than it was about drug abuse. He also denied that the film had any kind of moral agenda, pointing out that "It is not necessarily the most aggressive ones that get punished. It's mostly about a collective screw-up."

=== Pre-production ===
In early January 2018, Noé had the idea of starting the production of Climax right away, and to make the film much faster than in typical productions. Producers Vincent Maraval (who had produced Noé's previous two films Enter the Void and Love) and Edouard Weil agreed, under the condition that Noé would keep the production very short and film it for cheap. Noé stated: "The whole project happened very quickly. We started casting and preparing the movie at the beginning of January [2018], and we were shooting one month later in an abandoned school in a suburb in Paris. It was the most joyful and quick shooting I've ever done." He was able to quickly find a crew, made up of people that he had worked with before or had wanted to work with for a long time. The crew included cinematographer Benoît Debie, assistant director Claire Cobetta, and set decorator Jean Rabasse.

=== Casting ===
The film was cast over the month of January 2018. It was mostly made of dancers with no acting experience, as Noé found the cast himself mostly in ballrooms, krumping battles, or on the internet. As vogue and krumping are largely individual dances, most of the cast had no experience dancing as a group, or in synchronization. When asked about the casting process for the film, Noe said "I went to see some voguing ballrooms and krump battles, and I was hypnotized by their body language. These guys, who are usually very poor, become stars onstage once a month in a ballroom or in a battle."

The film's choreographer, Nina McNeely, is the one who had the idea of casting Sofia Boutella. The only cast members with acting experience were Sofia Boutella and Souheila Yacoub; Boutella had been a dancer for many years, although she had stopped dancing a few years before, and agreed to do it again for the film. One of the cast members was a contortionist in Congo whom Noé had heard of when searching for unusual dancers, and got into touch with before flying him to France. An agent brought up Yacoub when Noé asked for a dancer who would be "able to scream and shout on demand [...] I met her and we did a quick casting to see how much she could scream and dance... and she was excellent and I was like can you start on Monday... she thought I was joking at first." He recognized that the characters played by Boutella and Yacoub "would have been too hard [for] someone who is not really an actor, as they were more complicated psychologically."

=== Filming ===
Climax was shot in 15 days in an abandoned school in Paris. Although Noé conceived a basic story, and gave the cast ideas as to where the story and characters could go, he did not write any lines, and let the cast improvise the dialogue and most of the situations in front of the camera; there were no rehearsals, and only the premise, the characters' basic personality traits, and the early dance scene had been planned beforehand. He stated that when the cast asked him for a script so they could learn their lines, he answered, "No, just come to the set and do whatever you want, I'll never push you to do anything against your will and if you have any ideas please tell them to me." Noé did give several ideas to the cast, but let them be free to follow them or not: "I knew the start and the end point, but I didn't know the in-between. For example, initially I thought Sofia Boutella's character, Selva, would end up with a boy, then I thought maybe it could be a girl. When I met the Russian girl dancer and I asked Sofia if she minds ending up with her, she didn't... so the whole thing was quite organic. Then I didn't know how the story of the DJ would end... oh maybe he ends with the young dancer... But everything was shot in chronological order, which keeps the door open for any kind of re-writing." He stated that "The mood on set was so joyful and friendly. People were not getting wasted. I asked them what you would enjoy doing in the movie? How would you want to shock an audience? I would never ask them to do, what they would not like doing. Tell me who you want to kiss? Who you want to smash? Who you want to insult? And I would ask the other person, would you mind if this person wants to do this or that. And of-course the reciprocal person was welcome to [propose] anything."

After the opening scene and the audition tapes, the plot of the film starts with a long take lasting over 12 minutes, with the first five minutes consisting of a fully choreographed dance by the cast. The choreography had also not been rehearsed before shooting, with the cast improving the dance and adding to it with each take, with the help of McNeely and the rest of the crew. They eventually filmed sixteen takes, with the fifteenth being the one used in the film; Noé stated that the final two takes were the only ones good enough to be used. Another long take central to the film lasts over 42 minutes, almost half of the film's running time; Noé stated that "I was operating the camera but I had no idea how I was going to frame the scenes until immediately before I was on the set. I especially wanted the second half of the movie to be one continuous master shot, but how it was going to be I had no idea."

About the opening shot, in which Lou is seen screaming in the snow and the end credits roll, Noé stated: "I look at [the film as] a book and there is a prologue, or at the end an epilogue, a bibliography, or an additional personal note. In the case of this movie, the first exaggerated scene with her being bloody, crying in the snow, it wasn't meant to be. It was just snowing in Paris for two days and the second day, I thought about possibly taking advantage of the weather. We got a drone and filmed the girl in the snow from above. I didn't know how to use that footage at first. Later in the movie when they open the door, I thought that could fit in with the previous footage, if we made it snow outside and make it look like they were locked in. So I got some snow machines to re-create the whole thing. When people mentioned that there was some reference to The Shining it wasn't that at all. I liked the idea of getting rid of the credits at the beginning of the movie. I hate ending credits. I like movies from the 40s, 50s of which movies would end abruptly. So, I knew how I wanted to end the movie. I found like a satanic icon that I could put before the movie starts. Like an omen, that's something is going to turn bad, there was going to be a big drama, that the world is going to turn to hell."

There was no clear ending in mind while the actors were improvising. According to Noé, the only narrative directive given to the cast about the end of the story was that "the most fragile ones would die at the end! Only the strong survive." The interview tapes featured early in the film were not originally planned, but Noé's line producer suggested that the cast should have talked more in the film, and came up with the idea of interviewing them for possible extra footage for the home media release; it was eventually added to the film. Those scenes were also completely improvised.

While he had also featured drugs in previous films, Noé decided to have a different approach in Climax: "I didn't want to do any visual or sound effects to reproduce the feeling you are having when you're on drugs. I thought it would be funny to do it the other way, like shoot almost documentary style with long cuts, seeing how the effects of drugs and alcohol are experienced, how its seen from the outside. Like how it all shows and not how it feels." He also left the cast free to have their characters react to LSD in whichever way they preferred, as people can react very differently to it in real life: "They were all quite keen to get to the second part of the shoot, with the drugs and everything going crazy. I showed them all these videos; people high on LSD, mushrooms, crack, whatever. Then after, I asked each one how they would want to portray their own craziness."

=== Music ===
The soundtrack features music by Daft Punk, Aphex Twin, Giorgio Moroder, Soft Cell, Dopplereffekt, Cerrone, and Chris Carter amongst others, as well as an original song by Daft Punk's Thomas Bangalter, who had previously composed the score to Noé's Irréversible.

== Release ==
Climax premiered on 13 May 2018 at the Cannes Film Festival, screening in the Directors' Fortnight section where it won the Art Cinema Award.

The film was released in France on 19 September 2018 by Wild Bunch Distribution and in Belgium on 21 November 2018 by O'Brother Distribution. It was released in the United Kingdom on 21 September 2018 by Arrow Films, and in the United States on 1 March 2019 by A24.

=== Marketing ===
For the premiere at the Cannes Film Festival, the promotional material for the film humorously addressed the polarising responses and controversies surrounding Noé's previous films, stating: "You despised I Stand Alone, hated Irréversible, execrated Enter the Void, cursed Love, come celebrate Climax." A limited stock of 100 VHS copies of the film was sold by A24.

== Reception ==
=== Box office ===
Climax grossed $817,339 in the United States and Canada, and $878,930 in other territories, for a total worldwide gross of $1.7 million, against a production budget of $2.9 million.

=== Critical response ===
On the review aggregator website Rotten Tomatoes, the film holds an approval rating of 69% based on 185 reviews, with an average rating of 7/10. The website's critics consensus reads, "Challenging and rewarding in equal measure, Climax captures writer-director Gaspar Noé working near his technically brilliant and visually distinctive peak." On Metacritic, the film has a weighted average score of 69 out of 100 based on 37 critics, indicating "generally favorable reviews". Noé's direction, Benoît Debie's cinematography, Thomas Bangalter's score, and the performances (both in terms of acting and dance) were praised; Boutella, in particular, was singled out. However, some criticised the violence and story. Critics agreed that the film had a unique style, but while most found this to be a positive quality, other reviewers heavily disliked it.

In a positive review, Joseph Walsh of Time Out stated: "Inventive and seductive, this infernal chamber piece will be sure to divide opinion. The camera plunges into the chaos, melding physical theatre with a palette of fiendish reds and impish greens, all accompanied by throbbing techno. Part musical, part political treatise, and with more than a wink to Dante's Divine Comedy, Noé is at his most decadent and devilish." Hau Chu of The Washington Post also gave a positive review, stating that "Noé has made what might be his most accessible and, yes, tender film to date, teasing the idea of heavenly bliss - before heading straight to hell."

Ray Pride of Newcity gave a very positive review, stating: "Climax is a rude, refined, gyroscopic, hurtling mash-up ... of heaven and hell [with] a bravura dance number with a ravishing range of bodies in orchestrations of sensual motion and the camera brandishing its lavish mobility for moments on end." Writing for the Chicago Sun-Times, Richard Roeper was less positive: although he highly praised the various dance scenes, calling them "a jarring, beautiful, dangerously adventurous symphony of arms and legs and torsos, bursting with originality and sexuality and almost violent physicality, all set to a relentless and seemingly endless hip-hop beat. Seriously great stuff", he criticized the dialogue and horror scenes, stating that the film "turns into a sick circus of atrocities", which "just as often is more annoying and attention-seeking than dramatically effective, and the increasingly absurdist storyline. Alas, with the notable exception of the empathetic Boutella, the cast of Climax consists primarily of dancers who are not actors. And as actors, they're really good dancers."

Scott Craven of The Arizona Republic panned the film, rating it 1 out of 5 and stating, "Climax is actually two movies, one in which you hang out at a party with young dancers who are as wearisome as they are flexible, and the other with the same group on acid. Neither is the least bit interesting. [...] Gaspar Noe doesn't care what you think. He makes movies to provoke, if not to inspire annoyance, even hate. When a mom locks her young son in an electrical closet (inside is a menacing circuit panel that, if animate, would swallow the child whole), even those without kids cringe as the boy screams for help. Noe laughs at your discomfort." He concluded saying: "You just have to figure out if it's a ride you want to take".

Regarding the overall positive response to Climax, unlike most of his films which were more polarizing or controversial, Noé stated jokingly: "I must be doing something wrong. I have to take a long holiday and rethink my career." In another he claimed: "Even my father tells me it's his favorite film, and there's a lot of directors who told me it was my best film. I never worked so little on something and I was never congratulated so much."

In 2025, it was one of the films voted for the "Readers' Choice" edition of The New York Times' list of "The 100 Best Movies of the 21st Century," finishing at number 282.

=== Accolades ===
Award	Date of ceremony	Category	Recipient(s)	Result	Ref(s)
Cannes Film Festival	17 May 2018	Art Cinema Award	Gaspar Noé	Won	
Dublin Film Critics Circle Awards	20 December 2018	Best Cinematography	Benoît Debie	Nominated	
Festival du nouveau cinéma	13 October 2018	Temps Ø Public's Choice Award	Climax	Nominated	
Lumière Awards	4 February 2019	Best Director	Gaspar Noé	Nominated	
Lumière Awards	4 February 2019	Best Cinematography	Benoît Debie	Nominated	
Méliès International Festivals Federation	13 October 2018	Méliès d'Or	Climax	Won	
Neuchâtel International Fantastic Film Festival	14 July 2018	H. R. Giger Award « Narcisse » for Best Feature Film	Climax	Won	
Neuchâtel International Fantastic Film Festival	14 July 2018	Méliès d'Argent for Best European Fantastic Feature Film	Climax	Won	
Sitges Film Festival	13 October 2018	Best Feature Length Film	Climax	Won	
Strasbourg European Fantastic Film Festival	22 September 2018	Golden Octopus for Best International Fantastic Film	Climax	Nominated	
Tromsø International Film Festival	20 January 2019	Aurora Award	Climax	Nominated	

== See also ==
- List of films featuring hallucinogens
