= Warren Du Preez and Nick Thornton Jones =

British photographic and filmmaking duo

Warren Du Preez and Nick Thornton Jones are a London-based photographic and filmmaking duo whose work spans fashion, film, art, scenography and music; together they founded WN Studio.

== Lives and careers ==
Du Preez, a self-taught photographer from Johannesburg, arrived in London in 1989 and began shooting for magazines in 1992 with his first editorial for The Face magazine. Thornton Jones started his career as an art director. They began collaborating in the late nineties and have worked together ever since.

== Fashion photography – magazines ==
Du Preez and Thornton Jones’ work has featured in the fashion magazines I-D; Visionaire; Big Magazine; Numero; V Magazine and The New York Times.

== Advertising campaigns ==
Du Preez and Thornton Jones have created photography, film and digital campaigns for beauty, fashion and automotive clients including Lancôme; BMW; Pepé Jeans; Schweppes and Perrier Jouët. They have also photographed print campaigns for Issey Miyake; Boucheron; Cartier; Mercedes Benz; Absolut; Hermes; Thierry Mugler and Levi's.

They were involved in the global campaign visuals for the Louis Vuitton 2022/23 collaboration with artist, Yayoi Kusama. As a part of the project, they created a photorealistic 3D avatar of Kusama, as well as re-imagining and animating her art, for assets showcased and experienced across XR (AR/VR), traditional and anamorphic billboards, gaming and 3D environments.

== Music ==
Over the last decade, the duo have worked with Icelandic pop star, Björk, winning the Cannes Lion Grand Prix in 2017 for their virtual reality experience on Björk's NOTGET.

They are also collaborators with British DJ, producer and electronic recording artist, James Lavelle and his collective, UNKLE, having directed the art film released for The Lost Highway, as well as music videos for Follow Me Down and The Runaway, from the album Where Did the Night Fall. They have also collaborated with British trip-hop/electro artists, Massive Attack.

== Fashions shows and scenography ==
In October 2007 they devised the theatrical showpiece light installation for La Dame Bleue – the SS08 show from late British fashion designer, Alexander McQueen.

== Filmmaking – art projects ==
In 2013 Du Preez & Thornton Jones directed Erebus – a filmic response to British choreographer Russell Maliphant's staging of The Rodin Project, created in tandem with Sadler's Wells theatre, London. Initially previewed at the British Film Institute (BFI), in collaboration with gallerist Siobhan Andrews of Daydreaming Projects, the Erebus project was also exhibited as a film, a series of static artworks as well as an exterior installation during London's Frieze Art Fair, 2013.

In 2015 W&N collaborated with Daria Werbowy to produce the animated film ‘ALEPH’ as part of the Creative Review 2015 annual cover.

In 2017 they won the Cannes Grand Prix award for their VR project Not Get in their collaboration with Bjork with their exec producer Campbell Beaton.

In 2019, W&N directed a film for UNKLE's album ‘The Road: Part II (Lost Highway)'. Invoking a female Rōnin, the film centred around a performance by progressive Chinese dancer Maya Jilan Dong, and was shot by Henry Braham, with choreography by Farooq Chaudhry OBE.

In 2020, W&N began a visual storytelling process with choreographer and dancer Dickson Mbi, culminating in live-visuals and a film for 'Enowate'.

In 2021, W&N, in collaboration with Philip Beesley and Salvador Breed, showcased installation 'Grove Cradle' at the Venice Biennale.

== Exhibitions ==
- 2021 – ‘Grove’ with Philip Beesley at the Venice Biennale, Venice
- 2021 – Beyond the Road - Hyundai Seoul’s ALT1 Gallery, group show Seoul
- 2017-2020 – 'Bjork Digital' VR Exhibition - a touring VR exhibition including the ‘Notget’ VR experience. Tour locations include Miraikan, Tokyo; Somerset House, London; Harpa, Reykjavik; Centro Nacional de les Artes By Grupo Sentido, Mexico City; Museu da Imagem e do Som, São Paulo; among others.
- 2019 – Beyond the Road - Saatchi Gallery, group show, London
- 2019 – Michele Lamy - Dover Street Market Photo, London
- 2018 – Veuve Clicquot ‘Widow’ Series: Rebels - The Bargehouse Southbank, group show, London
- 2017 – Kimono Roboto - Space O gallery, group show, Tokyo
- 2017 – Immortal - Gallery 46, solo exhibition, London
- 2016 – Daydreaming with Stanley Kubrick - Somerset House, group show, London
- 2014 – Meltdown Festival ‘Worship’ film installation featuring Michele Lamy, London
- 2013 – Erebus – Frieze London, London Newcastle Gallery, solo show, London
- 2012 – Daydreaming – The Hong Kong Edition, Artistree, group show, Hong Kong
- 2011 – When the Night Falls - Vinyl Factory Gallery, solo exhibition, London
- 2010 – Daydreaming - Haunch of Venison Gallery, group show, London
- 2010 – ’52 Weeks’ for Shelter - 20 Hoxton Projects, group show, London
- 2009 – Phillips de Pury – NOW group show, London
- 2009 – ‘House of Cards’ for Shelter - Haunch of Venison Gallery, group show, London
- 2008 – Lazarides Gallery – Unkle War Paint show with Robert Del Naja, London
- 2007 – Prêt a Porter – Solo Show, Paris
- 2007 – In the Making: Fashion & Advertising, National Portrait Gallery group show, London
- 2004 – Issey Miyake Roppongi store - solo show, Tokyo
- 2004 – Issey Miyake Conduit Street store - solo show, London
- 2003 – ‘Yanomami, Spirit of the Forest’ for Naoki Takizawa - Fondation Cartier, group show, Paris
- 2002 – Colette – 5th Birthday – solo exhibition, Paris
- 2001 – 'Exquisite Corpse’ for Visionaire magazine - Paul Kasmin Gallery, group exhibition, São Paulo, Brazil
- 2001 – 'A Decade ‘Dreaming in Print’ for Visionaire magazine – Fashion Institute of Technology (FIT), New York

== Installations ==
- 2009 – Lightform installation performance with Unkle music collective, De La Warr Pavilion, East Sussex, UK 2009.
- 2007 – Bird of Light, Alexander McQueen S/S 2008 show collaboration (lightform installation).
- 2005 – Institute Contemporary Arts (ICA) – Mutation film installation / Fashioning the future, London
- 2004 – Fashion at Belsay, Zero G film installation in collaboration with Hamish Morrow, Northumberland, UK
- 2003 – TATE magazine art + fashion, feature x collaboration with Issey Miyake, London

== Books ==
- 2017 – Immortal Box Set
- 2005 – Fashioning the Future, published by Thames & Hudson
- 2003 – Gas Book 14, Warren du Preez and Nick Thornton Jones, published by Takeyuki Fuji
- 2002 – Book One, published by Studio/Colette.
