= Malqueridas =

2023 Chilean documentary film

- Promotional release poster
- Directed by: Tana Gilbert
- Screenplay by: Tana Gilbert; Paola Castillo Villagrán; Javiera Velozo; Karina Sánchez
- Produced by: Paola Castillo; Dirk Manthey
- Edited by: Javiera Velozo; Tana Gilbert
- Release date: 7 September 2023 (Venice)
- Running time: 74 minutes
- Countries: Chile; Germany
- Language: Spanish

Malqueridas (lit. 'Unloved women') is a 2023 Chilean-German documentary film directed by Tana Gilbert, at her feature film debut. It premiered at the 80th edition of the Venice Film Festival.

== Plot ==
The daily life of inmate mothers in a Chilean prison.

== Production ==
The film had a seven years production. It was shot clandestinely in a Chilean women's prison through cellphones.

== Release ==
While in its editing stage, a work-in-progress version of the film was screened at the 2022 Cannes Docs Marché du Film. It eventually premiered in the International Critics' Week section at the 80th Venice International Film Festival, being the first Chilean documentary ever screened in Venice sidebar, and it won the Critics' Week Grand Prize, as well as the award for best technical contribution.
