= Photophobia (film) =

2023 Slovak, Czech drama film

- Promotional release poster
- Directed by: Ivan Ostrochovský; Pavol Pekarčík
- Written by: Ivan Ostrochovský; Pavol Pekarčík
- Produced by: Ivan Ostrochovský; Albert Malinovský; Katarína Tomková; Tomáš Michálek; Kristýna Michálek Květová
- Starring: Nikita Tyshchenko
- Cinematography: Ivan Ostrochovský; Pavol Pekarčík
- Edited by: Ivan Ostrochovský; Pavol Pekarčík; Martin Piga
- Music by: Roman Kurhan; Michal Novinski
- Release date: September 1, 2023 (Venice)
- Running time: 71 minutes
- Countries: Slovakia; Czech Republic; Ukraine
- Languages: Ukrainian; Russian

Photophobia (Slovak: Światłowstręt, Ukrainian: «Фотофобія», Czech: Světloplachost) is a 2023 docudrama film written and directed by Ivan Ostrochovský, and Pavol Pekarčík. It premiered at the 80th Venice International Film Festival in the Giornate degli Autori sidebar, in which it won the Europa Cinemas Label Award. A co-production between Slovakia, Czech Republic and Ukraine, it was shot in Ukraine during the Russian invasion.

The film was selected as the Slovak entry for the Best International Feature Film at the 96th Academy Awards.

== Plot ==
The daily life of a Ukrainian family who live in the tunnels of the Kharkiv subway station to protect themselves from the Russian bombings.

== Cast ==
- Nikita Tyshchenko as Niki
- Viktoriia Mats as Vika
- Yana Yevdokymova as Niki's mother
- Yevhenii Borshch as Niki's stepfather
- Anna Tyshchenko as Anya, Niki's sister
- Vitaly Pavlovitch as Cowboy

== Accolades ==
Photophobia won the Youth Jury Prize for Best Documentary at the 22d International Film Festival and Forum on Human Rights.

== See also ==
- List of Slovak submissions for the Academy Award for Best International Feature Film
