= Souheila Yacoub =

Swiss actress (born 1992)

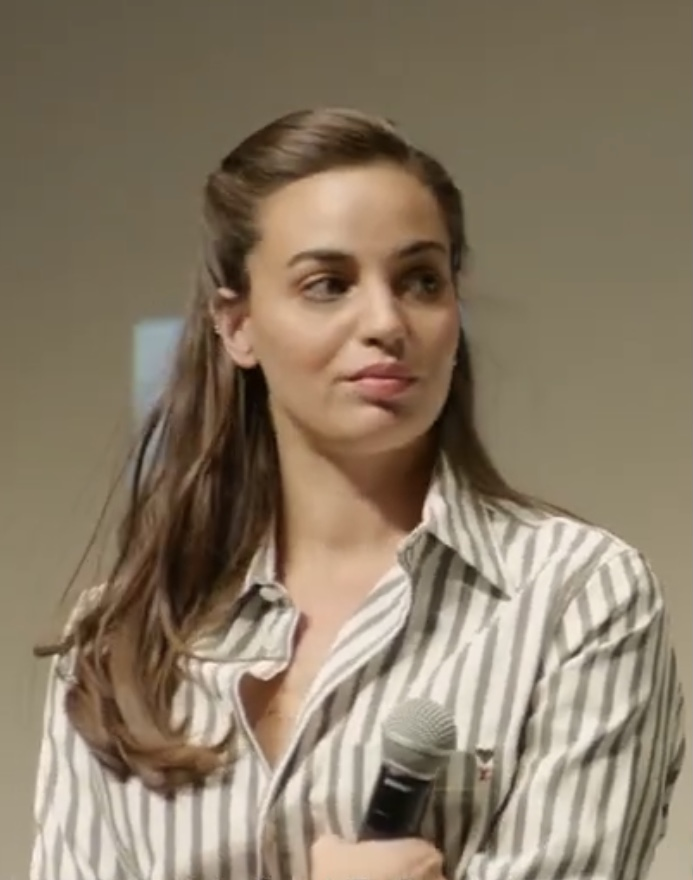
- Yacoub in 2021
- Born: 29 June 1992 (age 34); Geneva, Switzerland
- Occupation: Actress

Souheila Yacoub (born 29 June 1992) is a Swiss actress. Her films include Climax (2018), Making Of (2023), Dune: Part Two (2024) and Evil Dead Burn (2026). On television, she appeared in the Canal+ miniseries Savages (2019).

== Early life and education ==
Souheila Yacoub was born on 29 June 1992 in Geneva to a Tunisian father and a Flemish mother. She has a sister. Yacoub attended La Haute école fédérale de sport de Macolin and joined the Swiss National Rhythmic Gymnastics Team as a teenager, competing in the 2009 and 2010 World Rhythmic Gymnastics Championships. She left school at 16 to focus on gymnastics. When the team did not qualify for the Olympics, Yacoub quit the sport altogether. Although she did not officially testify against the coaches amid abuse allegations in 2020, detailed in the Magglingen Protocols, she supported her former teammates' claims and told a number of stories of the coaches' behaviour, such as limiting how much members could eat or drink and benching them for putting on a kilo.

After quitting, Yacoub returned home. Uncertain what to do next, her sister suggested she apply for Miss Suisse Romande. Yacoub also enrolled in local dance and acting classes. After winning Miss Suisse Romande 2012, Yacoub was offered a scholarship for a three-year programme at the Cours Florent in Paris. She further trained at the CNSAD.

== Career ==
Yacoub made her television debut in six episodes of the France 3 soap opera Plus belle la vie. Upon graduating from the Cours Florent, Yacoub landed her first major theatre role on the Paris stage as Wahida in Wajdi Mouawad's play Tous des oiseaux at Théâtre national de la Colline. She then starred in Gaspar Noé's 2018 horror film Climax and the 2019 Canal+ miniseries Savages.

In 2020, Yacoub appeared in the multilingual internationally co-produced war drama series No Man's Land. She starred in Philippe Garrel's black and white film The Salt of Tears, which premiered at the 70th Berlin International Film Festival, as well as The Braves and A Brighter Tomorrow in 2021.

Yacoub is the founder of theatre company 23h59.

== Filmography ==
=== Film ===
Year	Title	Role	Notes
2018	Climax	Lou	
2018	Les Affamés	Eva	
2020	The Salt of Tears (French: Le Sel des larmes)	Betsy	
2021	The Braves (French: Entre les vagues)	Margot	
2021	A Brighter Tomorrow (French: De bas étage)	Sarah	
2022	Rise (French: En corps)	Sabrina	
2023	Making Of	Nadia / Oudia	
2024	Dune: Part Two	Shishakli	
2024	The Balconettes	Ruby	
2024	Planet B	Nour	
2025	The Carpenter's Son	Lilith	
2026	Evil Dead Burn	Alice Price	

=== Television ===
Year	Title	Role	Notes
2016	Plus belle la vie	Aïcha	6 episodes
2019	Savages (French: Les Sauvages)	Jasmine	Miniseries
2020	No Man's Land	Sarya Dogan	Main role

=== Music videos ===
Song	Year	Artist	Notes
"Trop beau"	2019	Lomepal	

== Stage ==
Year	Title	Role	Notes
2017–2018	Tous des oiseaux	Wahida	Théâtre national de la Colline, Paris

== Awards and nominations ==
Year	Award	Category	Work	Result	Ref
2022	Berlinale	Shooting Star	—N/a	Won	
