= Campbell Beaton =

British producer

- Born: 29 September
- Occupation: Producer

Campbell Beaton is a British producer.

== About ==
Campbell Beaton is a producer and director. He has made commercials for the likes of Mercedes, Burberry and Dolce & Gabbana for Mario Testino. He promos for artists ranging from Bjork, Professor Green and Unkle.

Campbell has produced the feature films Last Swim, Bonus Track and Hot Property as well as the shorts, Half Hearted by Max McGill, The Karman Line by Oscar Sharp and Sean De Sparengo's Counting Backwards. He has also produced the 2017 Cannes Lions Grand Prix award-winning VR project Not Get for Bjork by directors Warren and Nick

== VR Awards ==
Cannes Grand Prix winner 2017 for Bjork Not Get VR directed by Warren Du Preez and Nick Thornton Jones

== Film awards ==
- Last Swim - Winner of the 2024 Berlinale Crystal Bear & Winner of the 2024 Berlin Kino Gilde award
- Cowboy Ben starring Shaun Dooley
- The Karman Line (Nomination for BAFTA 2015 Best Short Film).
