= Moin Hussain =

English film director and writer (born 1992)

- Born: 24 July 1992 (age 34); Tower Hamlets, London, England
- Education: University of Leeds
- Years active: 2015–present

Moin Hussain (born 24 July 1992) is an English film director and writer. He was named a 2018 Screen International Star of Tomorrow. He is known for his debut science fiction feature Sky Peals (2023). Born in London to an English mother and a Pakistani father, he graduated from the University of Leeds with a degree in Cinema and Photography.

== Early life ==
Hussain was born in Tower Hamlets, East London to an English mother and a Pakistani father, both sculptors, and moved to King's Lynn, Norfolk at age 10. He also has Welsh heritage on his mother's side. His paternal grandfather was from the border region around Kashmir and served in the British Army before moving to England.

Hussain was interested in music growing up and played in local bands. He went on to graduate with a Bachelor of Arts (BA) in Cinema and Photography from the University of Leeds in 2014.

== Career ==
Upon graduating university, Hussain joined a Directors Guild trainee programme. He wrote and directed his first short film Holy Thursday, with support from Creative England.

Hussain next directed the short horror film Real Gods Require Real Blood, written by Tom Benn. It premiered at the 2017 Cannes Critics' Week. Hussain also co-wrote the short film Noose, directed by Misha Vertkin.

Supported by Film4, Hussain's science fiction short film Naptha also featured at the 2018 Cannes Critics' Week. Hussain described Naptha as more personal than his previous work, inspired by his experiences as a teenager moving from London to Norfolk and working at a drive-thru.

Under the working title Birchanger Green and expanding on the themes and concepts in Naptha, Hussain started developing his debut feature in early 2019. He wrote most of the script during the COVID-19 lockdown, incorporating the isolation of the time into it. Sky Peals opened at the 80th Venice Film Festival to critical acclaim.

Hussain has two projects in development, one set at a textile mill in 1970s Yorkshire and the other in World War II Burma.

== Artistry ==
Hussain named Wim Wenders and Stan Brakhage films, Steven Spielberg's Close Encounters of the Third Kind (1977) and Todd Haynes' Safe (1995), and Éliane Radigue's music as influences on Sky Peals.

== Filmography ==
Year	Title	Director	Writer	Notes
2015	Holy Thursday	Yes	Yes	Short film
2017	Real Gods Require Real Blood	Yes	No	Short film
2017	Noose	No	Yes	Short film
2018	Naptha	Yes	Yes	Short film
2023	Sky Peals	Yes	Yes	
TBA	Burma			
