= The Red Suitcase (2023 film) =

Nepali film by Fidel Devkota

- Official artwork - The Red Suitcase (2023)
- Directed by: Fidel Devkota
- Written by: Fidel Devkota
- Produced by: Ram Krishna Pokharel; Fidel Devkota; Shova Thapa; Vimukthi Jayasundara
- Starring: Saugat Malla; Prabin Khatiwada; Shristi Shrestha; Bipin Karki
- Cinematography: Sushan Prajapati
- Edited by: Saman Alvitigala
- Production company: Icefall Productions
- Distributed by: REASON8 Films Ltd
- Release date: 8 September 2023 (80th Venice International Film Festival)
- Countries: Nepal, Sri Lanka
- Language: Nepalese

The Red Suitcase is a 2023 Nepali film written and directed by Fidel Devkota. It is produced by Nepalese producer Ram Krishna Pokharel’s Icefall Productions, alongside Shova Thapa with Sri Lanka’s Vimukthi Jayasundara serving as co-producer. London-based REASON8 handles international sales.

== Plot ==
A pick-up truck driver leaves Kathmandu airport for a two-day drive with a delivery to a remote mountain village. On the high road, a solitary figure slowly makes his way, wheeling a small red suitcase toward the same village.

== Film festivals ==
- Venice International Film Festival
- Zurich Film Festival
- JIO Mami Film Festival
