= Arthur Havisham =

Character in Charles Dickens novel

In Charles Dickens' 1861 novel Great Expectations, Arthur Havisham is Miss Havisham's younger, rebellious half-brother who was a result of Mr Havisham's affair with the cook after Mrs Havisham died. He and Compeyson plot against her and swindle her to gain more money, despite the fact that Mr Havisham had left Arthur plenty. Arthur was jealous that Mr Havisham favoured his sister and was extravagantly greedy with his money. He is a subordinate character in Great Expectations, working with Compeyson. Towards the end of his life he suffered from paranoia; a constant haunting by his sister's supposed presence around him. He dies of an illness caused by the guilt of how he had treated his sister. Through his death Dickens provided a kind of poetic justice in the novel.

== Representations ==
Descriptions in the book were kept minimal. The only reference to him was in chapter 42, where Abel Magwitch described his past experiences:

"There was another in with Compeyson, as was called Arthur – not as being so christened but as a surname. He was in a Decline, and was a shadow to look at. Him and Compeyson had been in a bad thing with a rich lady some years afore, and they'd made a pot of money by it; but Compeyson betted and gamed, and he'd have run through the king's taxes."

References to Arthur are generally absent from screen adaptations of the novel. In the 2011 BBC television series of Great Expectations, Arthur is mentioned as deceased and had a collection of butterflies on his wall.

The most recent representation of Arthur was portrayed by actor Joseph Quinn in the BBC 2015–2016 television series Dickensian in which he helps Compeyson to jilt his sister, to take back the brewery, and to inherit the remainder of his father's money. However, this does not go to plan because Compeyson is too manipulative, Compeyson implies strongly that the reason Arthur's father disinherited him was that he discovered Arthur was homosexual, which at the time was illegal and scandalous.
