= Oceans Are the Real Continents =

2023 Italian-Cuban drama film

- Spanish: Los océanos son los verdaderos continentes
- Directed by: Tommaso Santambrogio
- Written by: Tommaso Santambrogio
- Cinematography: Lorenzo Casadio Vannucci
- Edited by: Matteo Faccenda
- Release date: August 30, 2023 (Venice)
- Countries: Italy; Cuba
- Language: Spanish
- Box office: $24,435

Oceans Are the Real Continents (Spanish: Los océanos son los verdaderos continentes) is a 2023 Italian-Cuban drama film written and directed by Tommaso Santambrogio, at his feature film debut. It premiered at the 80th edition of the Venice Film Festival.

== Cast ==
- Alexander Diego as Alex
- Edith Ybarra Clara as Edith
- Frank Ernesto Lam as Frank
- Alain Alain Alfonso González as Alain
- Milagros Llanes Martínez as Milagros

== Production ==
The film is an expansion of a 2019 Santambrogio's short film with the same title which had premiered in the International Critics’ Week at the 76th Venice International Film Festival. The film is set and shot in San Antonio de los Baños. None of the cast members have previously appeared in a feature film.

== Release ==
The film opened the Giornate degli Autori section at the 80th Venice International Film Festival.

== Reception ==
On the review aggregator website Rotten Tomatoes, 100% of 11 critics' reviews are positive, with an average rating of 8.5/10. The Hollywood Reporter critic Jordan Mintzer described the film as "poetic" and "beautifully realized", and noted some stylistic affinities to Mikhail Kalatozov's I Am Cuba.
