= Sky Peals =

- Directed by: Moin Hussain
- Screenplay by: Moin Hussain
- Produced by: Michelle Stein; Jennifer Monks; Diva Rodriguez
- Starring: Faraz Ayub; Natalie Gavin
- Cinematography: Nick Cooke
- Edited by: Nse Asuquo
- Music by: Sarah Davachi
- Production company: Escape Films
- Release dates: 4 September 2023 (Venice Film Festival); 9 August 2024 (United Kingdom / Ireland)
- Country: United Kingdom
- Language: English

Sky Peals is a 2023 British science fiction drama film written and directed by Moin Hussain in his feature directorial debut. It premiered at the 80th edition of the Venice Film Festival.

== Cast ==
- Faraz Ayub as Umar a.k.a. Adam
- Natalie Gavin as Tara
- Claire Rushbrook as Donna
- Simon Nagra as Hamid
- Steve Oram as Jeff
- Jeff Mirza as Hassan
- Bill Fellows as Terry
- Adrian Hood as Raymond
- Maizie Wickson as Steph
- Alan Cammish as Reece

== Release ==
The film premiered at the 80th edition of the Venice Film Festival, in the Venice International Critics' Week sidebar. It was later screened at the BFI London Film Festival and at the Stockholm International Film Festival.

The film was theatrically released in United Kingdom and Ireland on 9 August 2024.

== Reception ==
On the review aggregator website Rotten Tomatoes, 100% of 15 critics' reviews are positive, with an average rating of 6.5/10. The Guardian called it a "creepy, distinctive British feature" and a "pointed meditation on racial and cultural identity, dressed up as a kind of emo SF tale." They awarded the film four stars out of five.
