= Frank Capra: Mr. America =

2023 British documentary film

- Directed by: Matthew Wells
- Written by: Matthew Wells
- Produced by: Nick Varley
- Cinematography: Oscar Oldershaw
- Edited by: Isobel Goodrich
- Music by: Roly Witherow
- Release date: 1 September 2023 (Venice)

Frank Capra: Mr. America is a 2023 British documentary film written and directed by Matthew Wells, at his feature film debut. It premiered out of competition at the 80th edition of the Venice Film Festival. The film focuses on director Frank Capra's personal life and career, through film clips, interviews, and Capra's home movies. Interwees include Alexander Payne, Jeanine Basinger, Tom Rothman, and Joseph McBride.

== Production ==
The film marked the feature film debut of Matthew Wells, who had previously directed a series of shorts about Stanley Kubrick. It is also the first film produced by Ten Thousand 86, a company founded by Park Circus founder Nick Varley. The film was fully funded by Sony Pictures.

== Release ==
The film had its world premiere at the 80th Venice International Film Festival in the Venice Classics sidebar. It was also screened at the 2024 Glasgow Film Festival, and the 2024 TCM Classic Film Festival, with Wells and Basinger presenting the film.

== Reception ==
Deadline's film critic Matthew Carey praised the director's non-apologethic approach and the film as a 'nuanced portrait [which] offers a fresh perspective' on Capra. Glenn Kenny described the film as 'cogent and moving'.
