= Songs for a Passerby =

2023 Dutch film

- Directed by: Celine Daemen
- Screenplay by: Olivier Herter
- Produced by: Dominique Slegers; Romain Bischoff; Celine Daemen; Ton Driessen; Joost Segers; Leonie Baars; Joost Heijthuijsen
- Starring: Sterre Konijn; Michaela Riener; Carl Refos; Georgi Sztojanov; Hans Croiset; Nadia Amin; Vincent van den Berg; Misja Nolet; Eleonora Schrickx; Garbo; Rey; Raffie; Micha
- Cinematography: Aron Fels
- Music by: Asa Horvitz
- Production companies: Silbersee; Studio Nergens; VIA ZUID; Muziekgebouw Productiehuis
- Release date: 30 August 2023 (80th Venice International Film Festival)
- Country: Netherlands

Songs for a Passerby is a 2023 Dutch surrealist virtual reality opera film directed by Celine Daemen, designed by VR artdirector Aron Fels, with compositions of Asa Horvitz en texts of librettist Olivier Herter. Songs for a Passerby premiered at the 80th Venice International Film Festival on 30 August 2023, where it won the Venice Immersive Grand Prize.

== Synopsis ==
Songs for a Passerby is a virtual reality experience during which the audience autonomously walks through an abandoned city landscape, wearing a VR head set. The film is structured like a musical dreamscape. The audience member themself becomes the protagonist in this film. Passing by various scenes, such as a choir of murmuring people, a dying horse lying on the ground and metro commuters with audible thoughts, the film allows the audience to step outside reality for a moment. A stray dog guides the audience through this experience. In the final scene both this stray dog and the audience have an encounter with their own 3D mirror image.

== Production ==
The film is a transdisciplinary work of art, using elements from music, visual arts, opera, film, literature and new media. Director Daemen herself described the film as an opera, since the musical dramaturgy was especially important to her during the production.

== Release and reception ==
Songs for a Passerby premiered in the official competition of the Venice Immersive section of the Venice International Film Festival. In this competition the film won the prestigious Grand Prize. This is the first prize of the Extended Reality section of the world leading art exhibition Venice Biennale. The jury called the film a visionary work of art and "a landmark work in the field of VR cinema." Also, the technical virtuosity and emotional impact of the film was praised by the jury. In The Netherlands, the film premiered at the Muziekgebouw in Amsterdam. The critical reception of Songs for a Passerby by the international press was overall positive.

The film was released in North America during its premiere at South by Southwest on the 10th of March 2024.

== Awards ==
Year	Award	Category	Recipient	Result
2023	Venice International Film Festival	Venice Immersive Grand Prize	Songs for a Passerby	Won
