= Last Swim =

2024 film by Sasha Nathwani

- Theatrical release poster
- Directed by: Sasha Nathwani
- Written by: Sasha Nathwani; Helen Simmons
- Produced by: Campbell Beaton; Bert Hamelinck; Nisha Mullea; Sorcha Shepherd; Helen Simmons; James Isilay
- Starring: Deba Hekmat; Lydia Fleming; Denzel Baidoo; Solly McLeod; Jay Lycurgo; Michelle Greenidge; Narges Rashidi
- Cinematography: Olan Collardy
- Edited by: Stephen Dunne
- Music by: Federico Albanese
- Production companies: Caviar London; Pablo & Zeus
- Distributed by: Vertigo Releasing
- Release dates: 16 February 2024 (Berlinale); 4 April 2025
- Running time: 96 minutes
- Country: United Kingdom
- Language: English

Last Swim is a 2024 British coming-of-age film directed by Sasha Nathwani, and written by Nathwani and Helen Simmons.

== Synopsis ==
British-Iranian sixth form student Ziba Soofi, who recently aced her A Levels and won a place at University College London (UCL) to study astrophysics, plans to celebrate results day with her friends Shea, Merf, and Tara. However, underneath what should be a joyous day, Ziba has been left depressed by a condition that threatens her future.

== Cast ==
- Deba Hekmat as Ziba Soofi
- Lydia Fleming as Tara
- Denzel Baidoo as Malcolm
- Solly McLeod as Shea
- Jay Lycurgo as Merf
- Michelle Greenidge as Tonya
- Narges Rashidi as Mona

== Production ==
Last Swim was in development as of 2021 and appeared on Filmarket Hub's 2022 UK Online Pitchbox list. Campbell Beaton produced the film for Pablo & Zeus, alongside Nisha Mullea and Bert Hamelinck for Caviar London. Principal photography took place in and around London in May and June 2023.

== Release ==
Last Swim opened the Generation 14plus competition at the 74th Berlin International Film Festival (Berlinale) where it also won a Crystal Bear and the AG Kino - Gilde - Cinema Vision 14Plus prize. It is set to be released by Vertigo Releasing in the UK on 4 April 2025, and at a later date in the US.

== Accolades ==
Award	Date	Category	Recipient	Result	Ref.
Berlin International Film Festival	25 February 2024	Crystal Bear for the Best Film	Sasha Nathwani	Won	
Berlin International Film Festival	25 February 2024	AG Kino - Gilde - Cinema Vision 14Plus prize	Sasha Nathwani	Won	
BFI London Film Festival	20 October 2024	Sutherland Trophy	Sasha Nathwani	Nominated	
