= Anaïs Tellenne =

- Born: May 17, 1987 (age 38); Paris
- Occupations: Actress, director, screenwriter
- Spouse: Amaury Chabauty

Anaïs Tellenne, born on May 17, 1987, in Paris, is a French actress, screenwriter, and director.

== Early life and education ==
Anaïs Tellenne was born on May 17, 1987, in Paris. She is the daughter of actors and directors Marc Tellenne, known as Karl Zéro, and Anne-Laure Tellenne, also known as Daisy d’Errata.

She trained as a dancer and actress.

== Career ==
She began her career as a film and television actress, as well as a theater performer.

After working as an actress, she directed her first short film, 19 Juin, which aired on France 2. She co-directed her second short film with Zoran Boukherma.

In 2020, she co-wrote the feature film L'Engloutie with Louise Hémon, which received the Beaumarchais writing grant and the Screenplay Award.

At 36 years old in 2023, she directed her first feature film, L'Homme d'argile · . The film "reimagines the myth of Pygmalion in a manor in Morvan" with Emmanuelle Devos and her muse Raphaël Thiéry. The film was nominated at the 80th edition of the Venice Film Festival in 2023.

In 2024, she directed the film Les indépendants in the United States, a biopic about Impressionist painter Mary Cassatt.

== Personal life ==
She is married to film composer Amaury Chabauty.

== Theatre ==
=== Actress ===
- Les Fourberies de Scapin by Molière, as Zerbinette, directed by Karl Eberhard, touring France on tréteaux.
- The Winter's Tale by William Shakespeare, as Paulina, directed by Claire Prévost, at Théâtre de l'Épouvantail.
- Le Cabaret volant by Roch-Antoine Albaladejo, as Irma, at Lucernaire.
- Cat in the Bag by Georges Feydeau, directed by Christophe Barratier, at Théâtre national de Nice (2009).

=== Director ===
- C'est au 5e, a comedy by Anne Vantal, performed at Théâtre des Funambules in Montmartre, Paris, and at the Avignon Festival at Théâtre du Buffon.

== Filmography ==
=== Director and screenwriter ===
==== Short films ====
- 2018: 19 juin
- 2018: Le Mal bleu (co-directed with Zoran Boukherma)
- 2019: Modern Jazz

==== Feature films ====
- 2023: L'Homme d'argile

==== Television ====
- Vice Versa (pilot)

==== Music videos ====
- Depuis que j'fume plus d'shit with Abd al Malik and Karl Zéro
