= Luna Carmoon =

English screenwriter and film director

- Born: 1997 or 1998 (age 27–28); Lewisham, London, England
- Occupations: Film director; scriptwriter
- Years active: 2018–present

Luna Carmoon (né Hollie Moore; born 1997 or 1998) is an English screenwriter and film director. Her 2023 debut feature film Hoard starred Joseph Quinn and Hayley Squires and premiered at the 80th Venice International Film Festival.

== Early life ==
Carmoon was born in Downham, Lewisham. Her father works as a plumber and her mother a hairdresser, they are divorced. She grew up on a council estate with her mum, sister, grandfather, and late-grandmother, who appears at the end of Hoard.

At 17, she realised that she could become a filmmaker and began applying to schemes that did not need a degree, as she was unable to afford film school.

Prior to becoming to filmmaker, Carmoon worked at her local CeX, she was also employed at a garden centre.

== Career ==
In 2019, Carmoon made her first short film Nosebleed with Sky Arts and National Youth Theatre via their "shortFLIX" scheme, ran by Creative UK. The film was screened at BFI London Film Festival and was broadcast on television the same year. The following year, Carmoon was selected as a Sundance Ignite fellow and directed her second short film Shagbands, produced by Film4 and BFI.

Carmoon then developed a script with Film4 who, she claims, "ghosted" her for a year after they put the project on "indefinite hold".

Carmoon made her feature film debut with Hoard in 2023, after a work in process screening at the 2022 BFI London Film Festival. For Hoard, Carmoon received Special Mention for Direction at 2024 Luxembourg City Film Festival.

She directed the 2024 "Here's The Thing" music video, a coming-of-age narrative depicting an Irish stepdancer befriending and joining a coven, for the Irish rock group Fontaines D.C.. The video surpassed 1 million views within two years on YouTube.

In 2025, Carmoon was nominated for the BAFTA Award for Outstanding Debut by a British Writer, Director or Producer. Subsequently. she became a member of BAFTA Breakthrough.

Her next project will be a book adaptation that she is transposing to the 1930s, and which will also draw influence from her own grandmother’s diaries.

She has contributed to both Sight and Sound and Tate Etc.

In 2026, Carmoon wrapped principal photography on her next feature; To Make Ends Meat, a horror starring Naomi Ackie, Alison Oliver and Éanna Hardwicke. The film, produced by BBC Film, BFI , Goodfellas, Mother, ProdCo, Arts Alliance, Affine Films, Cofiloisirs and Blush Film, will begin its sales launch at Marché du Film.

== Personal life ==
In an interview with Another Magazine, Carmoon explained she had depression during the COVID 19 lockdown, stating that Hoard, originally a 20-page short story, was intended as a suicide note.

She is currently in a relationship.

== Filmography ==
Year	Title	Director	Writer	Producer	Notes	Ref(s)
2019	Nosebleed	Yes	Yes	No	Short film	
2020	Shagbands	Yes	Yes	No	Short film	
2023	Hoard	Yes	Yes	No		
TBA	To Make Ends Meat	Yes	Yes	No		
