= 80th Venice International Film Festival =

2023 Italian film festival event

- 2023 official poster by Lorenzo Mattotti
- Opening film: Comandante
- Closing film: Society of the Snow
- Location: Venice, Italy
- Founded: 1932
- Awards: Golden Lion: Poor Things
- Hosted by: Caterina Murino
- Artistic director: Alberto Barbera
- Festival date: 30 August – 9 September 2023
- Website: www.labiennale.org/en/cinema/2023

Venice Film Festival chronology
- 81st 79th

The 80th annual Venice International Film Festival was held from 30 August to 9 September 2023, at Venice Lido in Italy.

Alberto Barbera, Venice's artistic director, acknowledged that the 2023 SAG-AFTRA strike was likely to impact the festival if it was not resolved in time, due to the strike rules that prevent all actors from taking part in any kind of promotional activities for their films. Nevertheless, the festival proceeded though fewer Hollywood celebrities than usual were in attendance, while an increase of European titles in all sections was expected. The world premieres of some upcoming award season hot titles expected to premiere at Venice, such as Ethan Coen's Drive-Away-Dolls, ended up delayed. As the strike was ongoing, some American films announced the absence of the cast in the red carpet of their world premieres, including Bradley Cooper, director/writer/producer and actor of Maestro.

American filmmaker Damien Chazelle served as Jury President for the main competition. Italian actress Caterina Murino hosted the opening and closing nights of the festival. The Golden Lion was awarded to Poor Things by Yorgos Lanthimos.

Italian director Liliana Cavani and Chinese/Hong Kong actor Tony Leung Chiu-wai were both awarded with the Golden Lion for Lifetime Achievement during the festival.

The festival opened with Comandante by Edoardo De Angelis. Luca Guadagnino's Challengers was originally scheduled to have its world premiere as the festival's opening film, but MGM/Amazon chose to withdraw it and delay its release due to the ongoing 2023 SAG-AFTRA strike. J. A. Bayona's Society of the Snow was the closing film.

== Juries ==
=== Main Competition (Venezia 80) ===
- Damien Chazelle, American filmmaker - Jury President
- Saleh Bakri, Palestinian actor
- Jane Campion, New Zealand filmmaker
- Mia Hansen-Løve, French filmmaker and actress
- Gabriele Mainetti, Italian filmmaker
- Martin McDonagh, British-Irish filmmaker and playwright
- Santiago Mitre, Argentine filmmaker
- Laura Poitras, American filmmaker
- Shu Qi, Chinese actress and model

=== Orizzonti ===
- Jonas Carpignano, Italian filmmaker - Jury President
- Kaouther Ben Hania, Tunisian filmmaker
- Kahlil Joseph, American filmmaker, music video director, and video artist
- Jean-Paul Salomé, French filmmaker
- Tricia Tuttle, programmer and director of the BFI London Film Festival and the BFI Flare: London LGBTQI+ Film Festival

=== Luigi de Laurentiis Award for Debut Film ===
- Alice Diop, French filmmaker - Jury President
- Faouzi Bensaïdi, Moroccan filmmaker
- Laura Citarella, Argentinian director and producer
- Andrea De Sica, Italian director and screenwriter
- Chloe Domont, American filmmaker

=== Venice Classics ===
- Andrea Pallaoro, Italian filmmaker - Jury President

=== Venice Immersive ===
- Singing Chen, Taiwanese filmmaker and music composer - Jury President
- Pedro Harres, Brazilian director, animator, screenwriter and multimedia artist
- German Heller, Argentinian animator and producer

== Official Selection ==
=== In Competition (Venezia 80) ===
The following films were selected for the main competition:

English Title	Original Title	Director(s)	Production Country
Adagio		Stefano Sollima	Italy
The Beast	La Bête	Bertrand Bonello	France, Canada
Comandante (opening film)		Edoardo De Angelis	Italy
Dogman		Luc Besson	France
El Conde		Pablo Larraín	Chile
Enea		Pietro Castellitto	Italy
Evil Does Not Exist	悪は存在しない	Ryusuke Hamaguchi	Japan
Ferrari		Michael Mann	United States
Finally Dawn	Finalmente l'alba	Saverio Costanzo	Italy
Green Border	Zielona granica	Agnieszka Holland	Poland, France, Czech Republic, Belgium
Holly		Fien Troch	Belgium, Netherlands, Luxembourg, France
Io capitano		Matteo Garrone	Italy, Belgium
The Killer		David Fincher	United States
Lubo		Giorgio Diritti	Italy, Switzerland
Maestro		Bradley Cooper	United States
Memory		Michel Franco	Mexico, United States
Origin		Ava DuVernay	United States
Out of Season	Hors-saison	Stéphane Brizé	France
Poor Things		Yorgos Lanthimos	United Kingdom, Ireland, United States
Priscilla		Sofia Coppola	United States, Italy
The Promised Land	Bastarden	Nikolaj Arcel	Denmark, Germany, Sweden
The Universal Theory	Die Theorie von allem	Timm Kröger	Germany, Austria, Switzerland
Woman Of...	Kobieta z...	Małgorzata Szumowska and Michał Englert	Poland, Sweden

=== Out of Competition ===
The following films were selected to be screened out of competition:

English Title	Original Title	Director(s)	Production Country
Fiction
Aggro Dr1ft		Harmony Korine	United States
The Caine Mutiny Court-Martial		William Friedkin	United States
Coup de chance		Woody Allen	France, United Kingdom
Daaaaaalí!		Quentin Dupieux	France
Hit Man		Richard Linklater	United States
The Order of Time	L'ordine del tempo	Liliana Cavani	Italy, Belgium
Making Of		Cédric Kahn	France
On the Pulse	Vivants	Alix Delaporte	France, Belgium
The Palace		Roman Polanski	Italy, Switzerland, Poland, France
The Penitent - A Rational Man		Luca Barbareschi	Italy
Society of the Snow (closing film)	La sociedad de la nieve	J. A. Bayona	Uruguay, Spain, Chile
Snow Leopard	雪豹	Pema Tseden	China
The Wonderful Story of Henry Sugar		Wes Anderson	United States
Non Fiction
Amor		Virginia Eleuteri Serpieri	Italy, Lithuania
Enzo Jannacci vengo anch'io		Giorgio Verdelli	Italy
Frente a Guernica (Director's Cut)		Yervant Gianikian, Angela Ricci Lucchi	Italy
Hollywoodgate		Ibrahim Nash'at	Germany, United States
Menus-Plaisirs – Les Troisgros		Frederick Wiseman	France, United States
Ryuichi Sakamoto | Opus		Neo Sora	Japan
Series
I Know Your Soul (episodes 1 and 2)	Znam kako dišeš	Alen Drljević, Nemin Hamzagić	Bosnia and Herzegovina
Of Money and Blood (12 episodes)	D'argent et de sang	Xavier Giannoli, Frédéric Planchon	France
Short Films
Welcome to Paradise		Leonardo Di Costanzo	Italy

=== Special Screening ===
The following films were selected to have a Special Screening:

English Title	Original Title	Director(s)	Production Country
The Lion's Share: A History of the Mostra	La parte del leone: una storia della Mostra	Baptiste Etchegaray, Giuseppe Bucchi	France, Italy

=== Orizzonti ===
The following films were selected to the Orizzonti main competition:

English Title	Original Title	Director(s)	Production Country
Behind the Mountains	Oura el jbel	Mohamed Ben Attia	Tunisia, Belgium, France, Italy, Saudi Arabia, Qatar
City of Wind	Сэр сэр салхи	Lkhagvadulam Purev-Ochir	France, Mongolia, Portugal, Netherlands, Germany, Qatar
Dormitory	Yurt	Nehir Tuna	Turkey, Germany, France
El paraíso		Enrico Maria Artale	Italy
An Endless Sunday	Una sterminata domenica	Alain Parroni	Italy, Germany, Ireland
Explanation for Everything	Magyarázat mindenre	Gábor Reisz	Hungary, Slovakia
The Featherweight		Robert Kolodny	United States
For Night Will Come	En attendant la nuit	Céline Rouzet	France, Belgium
Gasoline Rainbow		Bill Ross, Turner Ross	United States
Heartless	Sem Coração	Nara Normande, Tião	Brazil, France, Italy
Hesitation Wound	Tereddüt çİzgİsİ	Selman Nacar	Turkey, Spain, Romania, France
Housekeeping for Beginners	Domakinstvo za pocetnici	Goran Stolevski	North Macedonia, Poland, Croatia, Serbia, Kosovo
Nowhere	Invelle	Simone Massi	Italy, Switzerland
Paradise Is Burning	Paradiset brinner	Mika Gustafson	Sweden, Italy, Denmark, Finland
The Red Suitcase		Fidel Devkota	Nepal, Sri Lanka
Shadow of Fire	ほかげ	Shinya Tsukamoto	Japan
Tatami		Guy Nattiv and Zar Amir Ebrahimi	Georgia, United States
Upon Open Sky	A cielo abierto	Mariana Arriaga, Santiago Arriaga	Mexico, Spain

=== Orizzonti Extra ===
The following films were selected to the Orizzonti Extra section:

English Title	Original Title	Director(s)	Production Country
Day of the Fight		Jack Huston	United States
The Dreamer	L'homme d'Argile	Anaïs Tellenne	France
Felicità		Micaela Ramazzotti	Italy
Forever-Forever	Назавжди-Назавжди	Anna Buryachkova	Ukraine, Netherlands
In the Land of Saints and Sinners		Robert Lorenz	Ireland
Pet Shop Days		Olmo Schnabel	United States, Italy, United Kingdom, Mexico
Phantom Youth	Bota jonë	Luàna Bajrami	Kosovo, France
The Rescue: The Weight of the World	El rapto	Daniela Goggi	Argentina, United States
Stolen		Karan Tejpal	India

=== Venice Classics ===
Venice Classics is the section that since 2012 has presented world premiere screenings at the Venice Film Festival of a selection of the best restorations of film classics carried out over the past year by film archives, cultural institutions and production companies around the world. The section usually also presents a selection of documentaries about cinema. Director and screenwriter Andrea Pallaoro will chair a Jury of Film Students which will award the Venice Classics prizes for the respective competitions for Best Restored Film and for the Best Documentary About Cinema. The Jury chaired will be composed of 24 students, each of them recommended by professors of film studies from various Italian universities. The following films were selected to the Venice Classics section:

English Title	Original Title	Director(s)	Production Country
Restored Films - Main Competition
Andrei Rublev – Director's Cut (1966)	Андрей Рублёв	Andrei Tarkovsky	Soviet Union
Bellissima (1951)		Luchino Visconti	Italy
Bugis Street (1995)	妖街皇后	Yonfan	Hong Kong
The Creatures (1966)	Les Créatures	Agnès Varda	France
Days of Heaven (1978)		Terrence Malick	United States
Deep Crimson – Director's Cut (1996)	Profundo Carmesí	Arturo Ripstein	Mexico, Spain, France
The Exorcist (1973)		William Friedkin	United States
Harmonica (1973)	سازدهنی	Amir Naderi	Iran
The Hunt (1966)	La caza	Carlos Saura	Spain
Jungle Holocaust (1977)	Ultimo Mondo Cannibale	Ruggero Deodato	Italy
King & Country (1964)		Joseph Losey	United Kingdom
Life of a Shock Force Worker (1972)	Slike iz života udarnika	Bahrudin Bato Čengic	Yugoslavia
Moving (1993)	お引越し	Shinji Sômai	Japan
One from the Heart: Director's Cut (1982)		Francis Ford Coppola	United States
Rebecca of Sunnybrook Farm (1938)		Allan Dwan	United States
Shadows of Forgotten Ancestors (1965)	Тіні забутих предків	Sergei Parajanov	Soviet Union
There Was a Father (1942)	父ありき	Yasujiro Ozu	Japan
The Wayward Life (1953)	La provinciale	Mario Soldati	Italy
The Working Girls (1974)		Stephanie Rothman	United States
Restored Films - Out of Competition
Portrait of Gina (1958)		Orson Welles	United States, Italy
Documentaries about Cinema
Bill Douglas: My Best Friend		Jack Archer	United Kingdom
Dario Argento Panico		Simone Scafidi	United Kingdom
Le Film Pro-Nazi d’Hitchcock		Daphné Baiwir	France
Frank Capra: Mr. America		Matthew Wells	United Kingdom
Ken Jacobs: From Orchard Street to the Museum of Modern Art		Fred Riedel	United States
Landrián		Ernesto Daranas	Cuba, Spain
Michel Gondry: Do It Yourself		François Nemeta	France
Thank You Very Much		Alex Bravermen	United States
Un’altra Italia era possibile: il cinema di Giuseppe De Santis		Stefano Della Casa	Italy

=== Venice Immersive ===
The Venice Immersive is entirely devoted to immersive media and includes all XR means of creative expression, from 360° videos to XR works of any length, including installations and virtual worlds. The following projects were selected for the XR - Extended Reality section of La Biennale di Venezia:

English Title	Original Title	Director(s)	Production Country
In Competition
Body of Mine		Cameron Kostopoulos	United States
Chen Xiang VR		Liu Yuejun, Wu Nanni, Shi Tao, Xu Jingqiu	China
Comfortless		Gina Kim	South Korea, United States
Complex 7		Fins	United States
Emperor	Empereur	Marion Burguer, Ilan Cohen	France, Germany
Finally Me	Finalmente Eu	Marcio Sal	Brazil
Floating with Spirits		Juanita Onzaga	Belgium, Luxembourg, Netherlands
Flow		Adriaan Lokman	Netherlands, France
Frequency	周波数	Ellie Omiya	Japan
Gargolye Doyle		Ethan Shaftel	United States, Argentina, Austria
Home		Temsuyanger Longkumer	United Kingdom
Horse Canyon		Nprowler	Canada
The Imaginary Friend		Steye Hallema	Netherlands, Belgium, France
Jim Henson's the Storyteller: The Seven Ravens		Paul Raphaël, Félix Lajeunesse	Canada, United States
Letters from Drancy		Darren Emerson	United States, United Kingdom
My Name is O90		Siyeon Kim	South Korea
Oneroom-Babel		Sanghee Lee	South Korea
Pepitos: The Beak Saga		Ruxandra Gabriela Popescu	United Kingdom, United States
Perennials		Zoe Roellin	United States
Populate	Peupler	Maya Mouawad, Cyril Laurier	France, Lebanon
Remember this Place: 31°20’46’’N 34°46’46’’E		Patricia Echeverria Liras	Palestine, Qatar, Spain
Sen		Keisuke Itoh	Japan
Shadowtime		Sister Sylvester, Deniz Tortum	Netherlands, United States, Turkey
Songs for a Passerby		Celine Daemen	Netherlands
Spots of Light		Adam Weingrod	Israel, Canada
Tulpamancer		Marc Da Costa, Matthew Niederhauser	United States
Upwind	Aufwind	Florian Siebert	Germany
Wallace & Gromit in the Grand Getaway		Finbar Hawkins, Bram Ttwheam, Lawrence Benett	France, United Kingdom
Best of Immersive - Out of Competition
Another Fisherman's Tale		Alexis Moroz, Balthazar Auxietre	France
Consensus Gentium		Karen Palmer	United Kingdom, United States
David Attenbourough's Conquest of the Skies		Lewis Ball	United Kingdom, United States
The First Ingredient: Tales From Soda Island – CH. 7		Simone Fougnier	United States
Forager		WIinslow Porter, Elie Zananiri	United States
Gaudi, the Atelier of the Divine	Gaudi, l'atelier du divin	Stéphane Landowski, Gaël Cabouat	France, Japan
Over the Rainbow		Craig Quintero	Taiwan
Pixel Ripped 1978		Ana Ribeiro	United States
Space Explorers: Blue Marble – Orbit 1		Paul Raphaël, Félix Lajeunesse	Canada
The Utility Room		Lionel Marsden	United Kingdom
Biennale College Cinema VR - Out of Competition
First Day		Valeriy Korshunov	Ukraine
Human Violins - Prelude		Ioana Mischie	Romania, France
Origen		Emilia Sánchez Chiquetti	Brazil
Queer Utopia: Act I Cruising		Lui Avallos	Portugal, Brazil
Tales of the March		Stefano Casertano	Germany, Italy
A Vocal Landscape		Omid Zarei, Anne Jeppesen	Denmark, United States

=== Final Cut in Venice ===
Final Cut in Venice is the festival program that has been providing since 2013 support in the completion of films from African and Middle East countries. The following seven work-in-progress films have been selected for the 11th edition of Final Cut in Venice:

English Title	Original Title	Director(s)	Production Country
Fiction
Allah is Not Obliged	Allah n'est pas obligé	Zaven Najjar	France, Luxembourg, Belgium, Saudi Arabia, Canada, Slovakia, United States
Carissa		Jason Jacobs and Devon Delmar	South Africa
Happy Holidays		Scandar Copti	Palestine, Germany, France, Qatar, Italy
Life Is a Railroad	La Vie est un chemin de fer	Kevin Mavakala, Manassé Kashala, Tousmy Kilo, Isaac Sahani	Democratic Republic of Congo, France, Germany
Documentary
Sudan, When Poems Fall Apart	Soudan retiens les chants qui s'effondrent	Hind Meddeb	France, Tunisia
She Was Not Alone		Hussein Al-Asadi	Iraq, Saudi Arabia
Zion Music		Rama Thiaw	Senegal, Ivory Coast, Germany

== Independent sections ==
=== Venice International Critics’ Week (38. Settimana Internazionale della Critica) ===
The titles in competition will compete for the €5,000 Grand Prize and the €3,000 Audience Award. The selection committee is led by delegate general Beatrice Fiorentino with members including Enrico Azzano, Chiara Borroni, Ilaria Feole, and Federico Pedroni. The following films were selected to the International Critics’ Week sections:

English Title	Original Title	Director(s)	Production Country
In competition
About Last Year		Dunja Lavecchia, Beatrice Surano, Morena Terranova	Italy
Hoard		Luna Carmoon	United Kingdom
Life Is Not a Competition, But I'm Winning		Julia Fuhr Mann	Germany
Love Is a Gun	愛是一把槍	Lee Hong-chi	Hong Kong, Taiwan
Malqueridas		Tana Gilbert	Chile, Germany
Sky Peals		Moin Hussain	United Kingdom
The Vourdalak	Le Vourdalak	Adrien Beau	France
Special Screenings
God Is a Woman (opening film)	Dieu est une femme	Andres Peyrot	France, Switzerland, Panama
Infested (closing film)	Vermines	Sébastien Vaniček	France
Passione critica		Simone Isola, Franco Montini, Patrizia Pistagnesi	Italy
SIC@SIC Short Italian Cinema
De l'amour perdu		Lorenzo Quagliozzi	Italy
Foto di gruppo		Tommaso Frangini	Italy
It Isn't So		Fabrizio Paterniti Martello	Italy
La linea del terminatore		Gabriele Biasi	Italy
Las memorias perdidas de los árboles		Antonio La Camera	Italy, Spain
Pinoquo		Federico Demattè	Italy
We Should All Be Futurists		Angela Norelli	Italy
SIC@SIC Short Italian Cinema - Special Screenings
Incontro di notte (opening short film)		Liliana Cavani	Italy
Tilipirche (closing short film)		Francesco Piras	Italy

=== Giornate degli Autori ===
The line-up spans 10 films in competition, seven special events, eight titles in "Venice Nights" as well as a special day-long event devoted Vallée and the cinema of Québec. The following films were selected to the Giornate degli Autori sections:

English Title	Original Title	Director(s)	Production Country
In Competition
Backstage		Afef Ben Mahmoud, Khalil Benkirane	Morocco, Tunisia, Belgium, France, Qatar, Norway, Saudi Arabia
Foremost by Night	Sobre todo de noche	Víctor Iriarte	Spain, Portugal, France
Following the Sound	彼方のうた	Kyoshi Sugita	Japan
Humanist Vampire Seeking Consenting Suicidal Person	Vampire humaniste cherche suicidaire consentant	Ariane Louis-Seize	Canada
Milk	Melk	Stefanie Kolk	Netherlands
Oceans Are the Real Continents	Los océanos son los verdaderos continentes	Tommaso Santambrogio	Italy, Cuba
Photophobia		Ivan Ostrochovský, Pavol Pekarčík	Slovakia, Czech Republic, Ukraine
Sidonie in Japan	Sidonie au Japon	Élise Girard	France, Germany, Japan, Switzerland
Snow in Midsummer	五月雪	Chong Keat Aun	Malaysia, Taiwan, Singapore
The Summer with Carmen	Το Καλοκαίρι της Κάρμεν	Zacharias Mavroeidis	Greece
Through the Night	Quitter la nuit	Delphine Girard	Belgium, Canada, France
Out of Competition
Coup! (closing film)		Austin Stark, Joseph Schuman	United States
Special Events
21 Days Until the End of the World		Teona Strugar Mitevska	North Macedonia
Bye Bye Tiberias		Lina Soualem	France, Palestine, Belgium, Qatar
L'Expérience Zola		Gianluca Matarrese	France, Italy
The Outpost	L'avamposto	Edoardo Morabito	Italy, Brazil
The Sun Will Rise	آفتاب می‌شود	Ayat Najafi	Iran, France
This Is How a Child Becomes a Poet		Céline Sciamma	Italy, France
Miu Miu Women's Tales
#25 Eye Two Times Mouth		Lila Avilés	Mexico
#26 Stane		Antoneta Alamat Kusijanović	Croatia
Venice Nights
Casablanca		Adriano Valerio	France, Italy
Flesh and Bronze	Semidei	Fabio Mollo, Alessandra Cataleta	Italy
Fragments of a Life Loved	Frammenti di un percorso amoroso	Chloé Barreau	Italy
The Invention of Snow	L'invenzione della neve	Vittorio Moroni	Italy
Le Mie Poesie Non Cambieranno Il Mondo		Annalena Benini and Francesco Piccolo	Italy
With the Grace of a God	Con la grazia di un Dio	Alessandro Roja	Italy
Venice Nights - Special Screening
Nina of the Wolves	Nina dei lupi	Antonio Pisu	Italy
Venice Nights - Dialogues With Auteurs
Parola ai giovani		Angelo Bozzolini	Italy
Il popolo delle donne		Yuri Ancarani	Italy
The Writer in the Trees	Italo Calvino, lo scrittore sugli alberi	Duccio Chiarini	Italy, France
Venice Nights - Tribute to Jean-Marc Vallée in collaboration with SODEC and the Delegation of Quebec in Rome
C.R.A.Z.Y. (2005)		Jean-Marc Vallée	Canada

== Official Awards ==
=== Main Competition (Venezia 80) ===
- Golden Lion: Poor Things by Yorgos Lanthimos
- Grand Jury Prize: Evil Does Not Exist by Ryusuke Hamaguchi
- Special Jury Prize: Green Border by Agnieszka Holland
- Silver Lion: Matteo Garrone for Io capitano
- Volpi Cup for Best Actress: Cailee Spaeny for Priscilla
- Volpi Cup for Best Actor: Peter Sarsgaard for Memory
- Best Screenplay: Guillermo Calderón and Pablo Larraín for El Conde
- Marcello Mastroianni Award: Seydou Sarr for Io capitano

=== Golden Lion for Lifetime Achievement ===
- Liliana Cavani
- Tony Leung Chiu-wai

=== Orizzonti ===
- Best Film: Explanation for Everything by Gabor Reisz
- Best Director: Mika Gustafson for Paradise Is Burning
- Special Jury Prize: An Endless Sunday by Alain Parroni
- Best Actress: Margarita Rosa de Francisco for El paraíso
- Best Actor: Tergel Bold-Erdene for City of Wind
- Best Screenplay: El paraíso by Enrico Maria Artale
- Best Short Film: A Short Trip by Erenik Beqiri

=== Orizzonti Extra ===
- Audience Award: Felicità by Micaela Ramazzotti

=== Lion of the Future ===
- Luigi De Laurentiis Award for a Debut Film: Love Is a Gun by Lee Hong-chi

=== Venice Classics ===
- Best Documentary on Cinema: Thank You Very Much by Alex Bravermen
- Best Restored Film: Moving by Shinji Sômai

=== Venice Immersive ===
- Grand Prize: Songs for a Passerby by Celine Daemen
- Special Jury Prize: Flow by Adriaan Lokman
- Achievement Prize: Emperor by Marion Burguer, Ilan Cohen

=== Final Cut in Venice ===
- Carissa by Jason Jacobs, Devon Delmar
- “Coup de cœur de la Cinémathèque Afrique” award: Carissa by Jason Jacobs, Devon Delmar
- El Gouna Film Festival award: Sudan, When Poems Fall Apart by Hind Meddeb
- Eye on Films award: She Was Not Alone by Hussein Al-Asadi
- Festival International du Film d’Amiens award: She Was Not Alone by Hussein Al-Asadi
- Festival International de Films de Fribourg award: Carissa by Jason Jacobs, Devon Delmar
- Laser Film award: Happy Holidays by Scandar Copti
- MAD Solutions award: Sudan, When Poems Fall Apart by Hind Meddeb
- Organisation Internationale de la Francophonie (OIF – ACP – EU) post-production award: Life is A Railroad by Kevin Mavakala, Manassé Kashala, Isaac Sahani, Tousmy Kilo
- Oticons award: She Was Not Alone by Hussein Al-Asadi
- Music Supervision Oticons award: Life is A Railroad by Kevin Mavakala, Manassé Kashala, Isaac Sahani, Tousmy Kilo
- Rai Cinema award: Sudan, When Poems Fall Apart by Hind Meddeb
- Red Sea Fund of the Red Sea International Film Festival award: Sudan, When Poems Fall Apart by Hind Meddeb
- Sub-Ti Ltd award: She Was Not Alone by Hussein Al-Asadi
- Sub-Ti Access Srl award: She Was Not Alone by Hussein Al-Asadi
- TitraFilm award: Sudan, When Poems Fall Apart by Hind Meddeb
- Studio A Fabrica award: Happy Holidays by Scandar Copti

== Independent Sections Awards ==
The following collateral awards were conferred to films of the autonomous sections:

=== Venice International Critics' Week ===
- Grand Prize: Malqueridas by Tana Gilbert
  - Jury Special Mention:
    - Saura Lightfoot Leon in Hoard
    - Ariane Labed in The Vourdalak
- The Film Club Audience award: Hoard by Luna Carmoon
- Verona Film Club Award: Hoard by Luna Carmoon
- Mario Serandrei: Malqueridas by Tana Gilbert
- Best Short Film: Las Memorias Perdidas de los Arboles by Antonio La Camera
- Best Director: La linea del terminatore by Gabriele Biasi
- Best Technical Contribution: Malqueridas by Tana Gilbert

=== Giornate degli Autori ===
- Europa Cinemas Label Award: Photophobia by Ivan Ostrochovský, Pavol Pekarčík
- GdA Director's Award: Humanist Vampire Seeking Consenting Suicidal Person by Ariane Louis-Seize
- People Choice's Award: Through the Night by Delphine Girard

== Independent Awards ==
=== Queer Lion ===
- Housekeeping for Beginners by Goran Stolevski

=== ARCA CinemaGiovani Award ===
- Best Film of Venezia 80: Green Border by Agnieszka Holland
- Best Italian Film in Venice: El Paraíso by Enrico Maria Artale

=== Authors Under 40 Award ===
- Best Directing and Screenwriting: Luna Carmoon for Hoard
- Best Screenwriting: Mika Gustafson for Paradise Is Burning
  - Special Mention: Ariane Louis-Seize and Chrisine Doyon for Humanist Vampire Seeking Consenting Suicidal Person
  - Special Mention for Best Editing: Javira Velozo and Tana Gilbert for Malqueridas

=== Brain Award ===
- Tatami by Guy Nattiv and Zar Amir Ebrahimi

=== Casa Wabi - Mantarraya Award ===
- To the winner of the Lion of the Future Award

=== CICT - UNESCO Enrico Fulchignoni Award ===
- Io capitano by Matteo Garrone

=== Cinema & Arts Award ===
- Golden Musa: Backstage by Afef Ben Mahmoud and Khalil Benkirane
- Golden Musa: Making Of by Cédric Kahn
  - Special Mention Dedicated to a Multidisciplinary Artist': Chong Keat Aun for Snow in Midsummer

=== Premio CinemaSarà ===
- Green Border by Agnieszka Holland
  - Special Mention: Evil Does Not Exist by Ryusuke Hamaguchi

=== Civitas Award ===
- Io capitano by Matteo Garrone

=== Edipo Re Award ===
- Io capitano by Matteo Garrone
- Ca' Foscari Young Jury Award: Evil Does Not Exist by Ryusuke Hamaguchi

=== Premio Fondazione Fai Persona Lavoro Ambiente ===
- Evil Does Not Exist by Ryusuke Hamaguchi
  - Special Mention: Making Of by Cédric Kahn (treatment of issues related to work)
  - Special Mention: The Red Suitcase by Fidel Devkota (treatment of issues related to work)
  - Special Mention: Housekeeping for Beginners by Goran Stolevski (treatment of issues related to social environment)

=== Fanheart3 Award ===
- Graffetta d'Oro for Best Film: Dogman by Luc Besson
- Nave d'Argento for Best OTP: Characters Sasha and Paul in Humanist Vampire Seeking Consenting Suicidal Person by Ariane Louis-Seize
- XR Fan Experience: Gargoyle Doyle by Ethan Shaftel
  - XR Special Mention: Pixel Ripped 1978 by Ana Ribeiro

=== FEDIC Award ===
- Io capitano by Matteo Garrone
  - Special Mention for Best Film: Anna by Marco Amenta
  - Special Mention for Best Short Film: We Should All Be Futurists by Angela Norelli
  - Jury Special Prize: Passione Critica by Simone Isola, Franco Montini, Patrizia Pistagnesi

=== FIPRESCI Awards ===
- Best Film (main competition): Evil Does Not Exist by Ryusuke Hamaguchi
- Best Film (other sections): An Endless Sunday by Alain Parroni

=== Francesco Pasinetti Award ===
- Io capitano by Matteo Garrone

=== Green Drop Award ===
- Green Border by Agnieszka Holland (ex-aequo)
- Io capitano by Matteo Garrone (ex-aequo)

=== ImpACT Award ===
- Io capitano by Matteo Garrone

=== Lanterna Magica Award ===
- Io capitano by Matteo Garrone

=== Leoncino d'Oro Award ===
- Io capitano by Matteo Garrone
  - Cinema for UNICEF: Green Border by Agnieszka Holland

=== Lizzani Award ===
- Nowhere by Simone Massi

=== NUOVOIMAIE Talent Awards ===
- Best New Young Actor: Gianmarco Franchini for Adagio
- Best New Young Actress: Sara Ciocca for Nina of the Wolves

=== La Pellicola d'Oro Award ===
- Best Production Director: Claudia Cravotta for Io capitano
- Best Camera Operator: Massimiliano Kuveiller for Finally Dawn
- Best Set Designer: Simona Balducci for Comandante

=== SIGNIS Award ===
- Io capitano by Matteo Garrone
  - Special Mention: The Promised Land by Nikolaj Arcel

=== "Sorriso Diverso Venezia Award" XI Edition ===
- Best Italian Film: The Penitent - A Rational Man by Luca Barbareschi
- Best Foreign Film: Green Border by Agnieszka Holland

=== Premio Soundtrack Stars Award ===
- Best Soundtrack: Io capitano, soundtrack by Andrea Farri
  - Special Mention: The Killer, soundtrack by Trent Reznor and Atticus Ross
  - Special Prize: Adagio, soundtrack by Subsonica

=== UNIMED Award ===
- Best Film: Poor Things by Yorgos Lanthimos
- Prize for Cultural Diversity: Green Border by Agnieszka Holland

== Controversy ==
During the Festival, casting director of Io capitano, Henri-Didier Njikam, was denied an entry visa by the Italian Embassy in Rabat, Morocco, because there were no guarantees that he would leave Italian territory once he entered. In an interview with The Hollywood Reporter Roma, Njikam said the fact was perceived as "an act of racism" as "the embassy justified the refusal by claiming that there were no guarantees that I would leave Italian territory once I entered, in Venice. They basically treated me as a migrant, as if I wanted to take advantage of the situation to escape. But I have a job, a professional card from the Moroccan Film Center. And, frankly, if I wanted to work in Europe, I would have already done so," and that the entity "did not look at my resume or my documents, only the color of my skin. [...] This problem exists only with the Italian embassy in Morocco, because my colleagues from Ghana and the Ivory Coast were able to leave. If I had been white, I don't think I would have been treated this way."
