= Joseph Quinn =

British actor (born 1994)

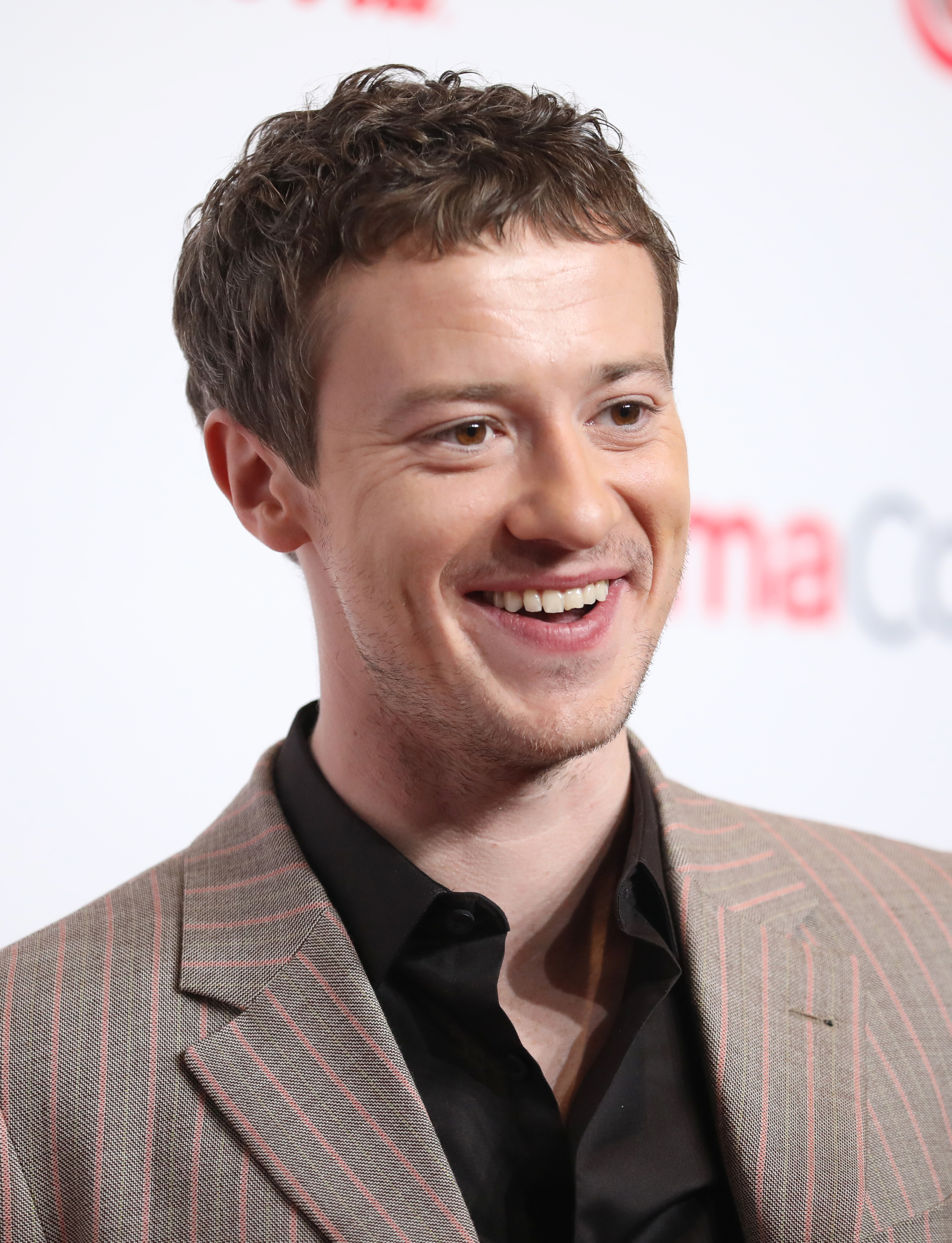
- Quinn in 2024
- Born: 26 January 1994 (age 32); London, England
- Citizenship: United Kingdom; Ireland
- Education: London Academy of Music and Dramatic Art
- Occupation: Actor
- Years active: 2011–present

Joseph Quinn (born 26 January 1994) is a British actor. After graduating from drama school, Quinn began his acting career on stage and television, earning roles in the BBC One series Dickensian (2016), Howards End (2017), Les Misérables (2018), and the Sky Atlantic series Catherine the Great (2019). His breakthrough role came as Eddie Munson in the fourth season of the Netflix series Stranger Things (2022).

In film, Quinn gained further recognition for starring in the science fiction horror film A Quiet Place: Day One (2024) as well as for portraying emperor Geta in the historical action film Gladiator II (2024) and Johnny Storm / Human Torch in the Marvel Cinematic Universe film The Fantastic Four: First Steps (2025). He also portrayed an American Navy SEAL in Alex Garland's Warfare (2025). He will portray George Harrison in Sam Mendes's upcoming The Beatles – A Four-Film Cinematic Event.

== Early life and education ==
Quinn was born on 26 January 1994 and brought up in South London. His father, Anthony, works as head of screen and audio performance at the London Academy of Music and Dramatic Art (LAMDA). Through his parents, Quinn holds both British and Irish citizenship.

He attended Emanuel, a private school, from 2007 to 2012. He subsequently went to drama school at LAMDA, graduating in 2015.

== Career ==
=== 2011–2021: Early roles ===
After graduating from LAMDA, Quinn was cast in the BBC One series Dickensian as main character Arthur Havisham. He starred in the 2017 four-part series Howards End as Leonard Bast, a young bank clerk, opposite Hayley Atwell. That same year, he starred in the short film KIN, and appeared in a season 7 episode of the HBO series Game of Thrones as Koner, a Stark soldier.

Quinn is also known for his work in theatre, appearing on the London stage at the National Theatre and Off West End. He was awarded Best Actor in a Studio Production at the 2017 Manchester Theatre Awards for his performance in Wish List. He was named a 2018 Screen International Star of Tomorrow. In 2018, Quinn played Enjolras in the BBC One adaptation of Les Misérables and made his feature film debut in Overlord. The following year, he starred alongside Molly Windsor in the thriller film Make Up and portrayed Tsarevich Pavel in the Sky Atlantic miniseries Catherine the Great. He voiced Will Ladislaw in a BBC Radio 4 adaptation of Middlemarch. In 2020, he appeared in the BBC One series Strike and the Mangrove installment of Steve McQueen's television anthology Small Axe.

=== 2022–present: Breakthrough, Stranger Things, and Marvel Cinematic Universe ===
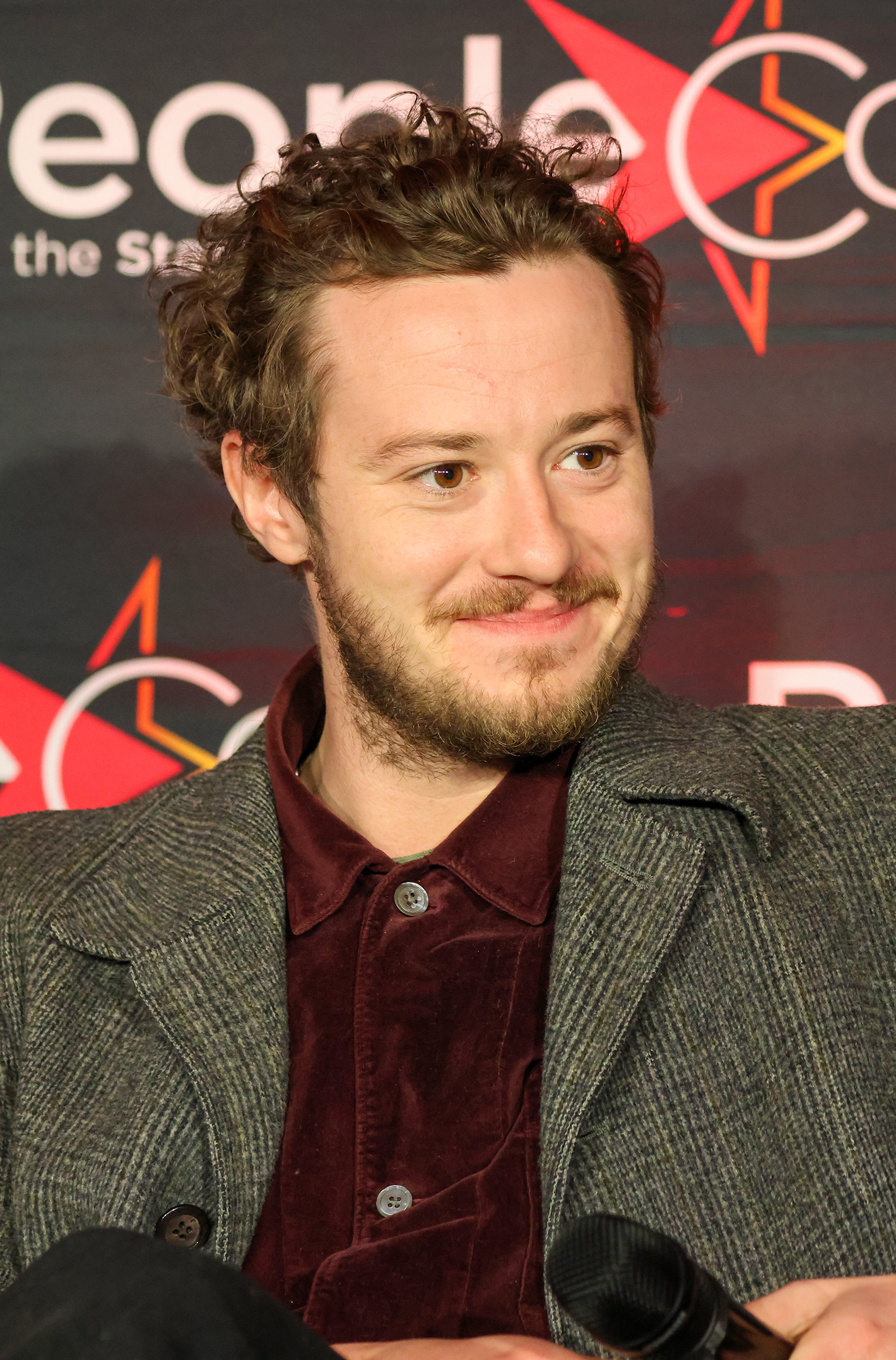
Quinn in 2022

In 2022, Quinn gained prominence internationally through his role as Eddie Munson in the fourth season of Stranger Things. He was cast in the role in 2019, with filming for the season taking place in 2021. Quinn was nominated for a Saturn Award for Best Supporting Actor in a Streaming Series for his role. He later won the Best Breakthrough Performance Award at the 2023 MTV Movie & TV Awards for his work on Stranger Things. In August 2022, Quinn signed with Creative Artists Agency. Quinn narrated the trailer for a reboot of the Lords of the Fallen video game. He became the official face for the Gris Dior fragrance in October 2022. At the 2022 Newport Beach Film Festival Honors, Quinn appeared on the Variety list of 10 Actors to Watch. In November 2022, Quinn was one of British GQ's Men of the Year Honourees.

Following his performance in Stranger Things, Quinn was cast in numerous major studio films. He starred with Lupita Nyong'o in the horror film A Quiet Place: Day One, directed by Michael Sarnoski, which was released in June 2024. He was also cast as Geta in the historical action film Gladiator II, directed by Ridley Scott, which released in November 2024. In 2025, Quinn featured alongside an ensemble cast in Warfare, a war film written and co-directed by Alex Garland, and portrayed Johnny Storm / Human Torch in the Marvel Cinematic Universe film The Fantastic Four: First Steps (2025), a role he will reprise in Avengers: Doomsday (2026) and Avengers: Secret Wars (2027). Quinn has also been cast as George Harrison in Sam Mendes's four-part biopic of the Beatles.

== Filmography ==
Key
†	Denotes films that have not yet been released

=== Film ===
Year	Title	Role	Notes	Ref.
2015	Instinct	Dan	Short film	
2017	KIN	Jamie	Short film	
2018	The Hoist	Hash	Short film	
2018	Overlord	Grunauer		
2019	Make Up	Tom		
2023	Hoard	Michael		
2024	A Quiet Place: Day One	Eric		
2024	Gladiator II	Publius Septimius Geta / Geta		
2025	Warfare	Sam		
2025	The Fantastic Four: First Steps	Johnny Storm / Human Torch		
2026	Down the Length †	TBD	Yet to be released	
2026	Avengers: Doomsday †	Johnny Storm / Human Torch	Post-production	
2027	Tidbit †	TBD	Post-production	
2028	The Beatles – A Four-Film Cinematic Event †	George Harrison	Filming	

=== Television ===
Year	Title	Role	Notes	Ref.
2011	Postcode	Tim	Episode #1.1	
2015–2016	Dickensian	Arthur Havisham	19 episodes	
2017	Game of Thrones	Koner	Episode: "The Spoils of War"	
2017	Howards End	Leonard Bast	4 episodes	
2017	Timewasters	Ralph	2 episodes	
2018	Les Misérables	Enjolras	3 episodes	
2019	Catherine the Great	Tsarevich Paul	4 episodes	
2020	Strike	Billy Knight	4 episodes	
2020	Small Axe	PC Dixon	Episode: "Mangrove"	
2022	Stranger Things	Edward "Eddie" Munson	Also starring, (season 4); 8 episodes	

=== Stage ===
Year	Title	Role	Director(s)	Venue	Ref.
2016	Deathwatch	Morris	Geraldine Alexander	Print Room	
2017	Wish List	Dean	Matthew Xia	Royal Court Theatre	
2017	Mosquitoes	Luke	Rufus Norris	Royal National Theatre	

=== Video games ===
Video game credits
Year	Title	Role	Notes	Ref.
2025	Fortnite Battle Royale	Johnny Storm / Human Torch	Likeness	
2026	Dead by Daylight	Eddie Munson	Likeness	

== Accolades ==
Award	Year	Category	Work	Results	Ref.
British Independent Film Awards	2024	Best Joint Lead Performance	Hoard	Nominated	
British Independent Film Awards	2025	Best Ensemble Performance	Warfare	Won	
MTV Movie & TV Awards	2023	Best Breakthrough Performance	Stranger Things	Won	
Saturn Awards	2022	Best Supporting Actor in a Streaming Series	Stranger Things	Nominated	
