= List of awards and nominations received by the Dardenne brothers =

Dardenne brothers awards and nominations
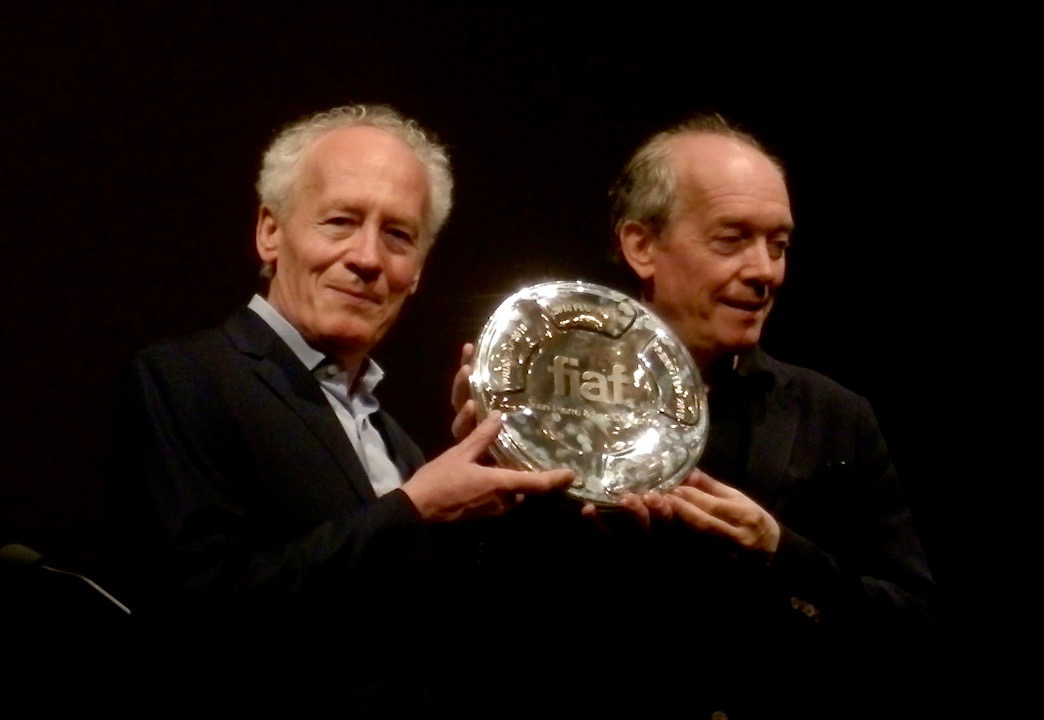
- Jean-Pierre and Luc Dardenne in 2016
Awards and nominations
Award	Wins	Nominations
British Academy Film Awards	0	1
Cannes Film Festival Awards	10	8

Totals (Note: Certain award groups do not simply award one winner. They acknowledge several different recipients, have runners-up, and have third place. Since this is a specific recognition and is different from losing an award, runner-up mentions are considered wins in this award tally. For simplification and to avoid errors, each award in this list has been presumed to have had a prior nomination.)
- Wins: 58
- Nominations: 107

The following is a list of awards and nominations received by the Belgian filmmaking duo Dardenne brothers (Jean-Pierre and Luc Dardenne).

== BAFTA Awards ==
Year	Nominated work	Category	Result	Ref
2015	Two Days, One Night	Best Film Not in the English Language	Nominated	

== Belgian Film Critics Association ==
Year	Nominated work	Category	Result	Ref
1996	La Promesse	André Cavens Award	Won	
1997	La Promesse	Grand Prix	Won	
1999	Rosetta	André Cavens Award	Won	
2002	The Son	André Cavens Award	Won	
2005	L'Enfant	André Cavens Award	Won	
2014	Two Days, One Night	André Cavens Award	Won	
2025	Young Mothers	André Cavens Award	Won	

== Bodil Awards ==
Year	Nominated work	Category	Result	Ref
2007	L'Enfant	Best Non-American Film	Nominated	
2015	Two Days, One Night	Best Non-American Film	Nominated	

== Cannes Film Festival ==
Year	Nominated work	Category	Result	Ref
1999	Rosetta	Palme d'Or	Won	
1999	Rosetta	Prize of the Ecumenical Jury	Special Mention	
2002	The Son	Palme d'Or	Nominated	
2002	The Son	Prize of the Ecumenical Jury	Special Mention	
2005	L'Enfant	Palme d'Or	Won	
2008	Lorna's Silence	Palme d'Or	Nominated	
2008	Lorna's Silence	Best Screenplay	Won	
2011	The Kid with a Bike	Palme d'Or	Nominated	
2011	The Kid with a Bike	Grand Prix	Won	
2014	Body of Work	Special Prize of the Ecumenical Jury	Won	
2014	Two Days, One Night	Palme d'Or	Nominated	
2016	The Unknown Girl	Palme d'Or	Nominated	
2019	Young Ahmed	Palme d'Or	Nominated	
2019	Young Ahmed	Best Director Award	Won	
2022	Tori and Lokita	Palme d'Or	Nominated	
2022	Tori and Lokita	75th Anniversary Award	Won	
2025	Young Mothers	Palme d'Or	Nominated	
2025	Young Mothers	Best Screenplay	Won	

== César Awards ==
Year	Nominated work	Category	Result	Ref
1997	La Promesse	Best Foreign Film	Nominated	
2006	L'Enfant	Best Film	Nominated	
2006	L'Enfant	Best Director	Nominated	
2006	L'Enfant	Best Original Screenplay	Nominated	
2009	Lorna's Silence	Best Foreign Film	Nominated	
2012	The Kid with a Bike	Best Foreign Film	Nominated	
2015	Two Days, One Night	Best Foreign Film	Nominated	
2017	The Unknown Girl	Best Foreign Film	Nominated	
2020	Young Ahmed	Best Foreign Film	Nominated	

== David di Donatello ==
Year	Nominated work	Category	Result	Ref
2006	L'Enfant	Best European Film	Nominated	

== European Film Awards ==
Year	Nominated work	Category	Result	Ref
1997	Gigi, Monica... et Bianca	Best Documentary	Won	
1999	Rosetta	Best Film	Nominated	
2002	The Son	Best Director	Nominated	
2005	L'Enfant	Best Film	Nominated	
2006	L'Enfant	People's Choice Award for Best European Film	Nominated	
2011	The Kid with a Bike	Best Film	Nominated	
2011	The Kid with a Bike	Best Director	Nominated	
2011	The Kid with a Bike	Best Screenwriter	Won	
2014	Two Days, One Night	Best Screenwriter	Nominated	
2014	Two Days, One Night	People's Choice Award for Best European Film	Nominated	

== Globes de Cristal Awards ==
Year	Nominated work	Category	Result	Ref
2015	Two Days, One Night	Best Film	Nominated	

== Golden Globe Awards ==
Year	Nominated work	Category	Result	Ref
2012	The Kid with a Bike	Best Foreign Language Film	Nominated	

== Gopo Awards ==
Year	Nominated work	Category	Result	Ref
2007	L'Enfant	Best European Film	Nominated	
2010	Lorna's Silence	Best European Film	Nominated	
2013	The Kid with a Bike	Best European Film	Nominated	

== Guldbagge Awards ==
Year	Nominated work	Category	Result	Ref
2006	L'Enfant	Best Foreign Film	Won	
2015	Two Days, One Night	Best Foreign Film	Won	

== Joseph Plateau Awards ==
Year	Nominated work	Category	Result	Ref
1997	La Promesse	Best Belgian Director	Won	
1999	La Promesse	Best Belgian Screenplay 1984–1999	Nominated	
2000	Rosetta	Best Belgian Director	Won	
2003	The Son	Best Belgian Director	Won	
2003	The Son	Best Belgian Screenplay	Nominated	
2006	L'Enfant	Best Belgian Director	Won	
2006	L'Enfant	Best Belgian Screenplay	Won	

== Independent Spirit Awards ==
Year	Nominated work	Category	Result	Ref
2000	Rosetta	Best International Film	Nominated	
2012	The Kid with a Bike	Best International Film	Nominated	

== Lumière Awards ==
Year	Nominated work	Category	Result	Ref
2003	The Son	Best French-Language Film	Won	
2006	L'Enfant	Best French-Language Film	Won	
2009	Lorna's Silence	Best French-Language Film	Won	
2015	Two Days, One Night	Best French-Language Film	Won	

== Lux Prize ==
Year	Nominated work	Category	Result	Ref
2008	Lorna's Silence		Won	

== Magritte Awards ==
Year	Nominated work	Category	Result	Ref
2012	The Kid with a Bike	Best Film	Nominated	
2012	The Kid with a Bike	Best Director	Nominated	
2012	The Kid with a Bike	Best Screenplay	Nominated	
2015	Two Days, One Night	Best Film	Won	
2015	Two Days, One Night	Best Director	Won	
2015	Two Days, One Night	Best Screenplay	Nominated	
2020	Young Ahmed	Best Film	Nominated	
2020	Young Ahmed	Best Director	Nominated	
2020	Young Ahmed	Best Screenplay	Nominated	
2022	Tori and Lokita	Best Film	Nominated	
2022	Tori and Lokita	Best Director	Nominated	

== Robert Awards ==
Year	Nominated work	Category	Result	Ref
2013	The Kid with a Bike	Best Non-American Film	Nominated	
2015	Two Days, One Night	Best Non-American Film	Won	

== Other organisation awards ==
Year	Nominated work	Organisation	Category	Result	Ref
1997	La Promesse	Los Angeles Film Critics Association	Best Foreign Language Film	Won	
1997	La Promesse	National Society of Film Critics	Best Foreign Language Film	Won	
1998	La Promesse	International Press Academy	Best Foreign Language Film	Won	
2003	The Son	San Francisco Film Critics Circle	Best Foreign Language Film	Won	
2005	L'Enfant	Russian Guild of Film Critics	Best Foreign Film	Won	
2006	L'Enfant	Toronto Film Critics Association	Best Director	Won	
2006	L'Enfant	Toronto Film Critics Association	Best Foreign Language Film	Won	
2007	L'Enfant	Argentine Film Critics Association	Best Foreign Language Film	Nominated	
2012	The Kid with a Bike	San Diego Film Critics Society	Best Foreign Language Film	Won	
2014	Two Days, One Night	Online Film Critics Society	Best Picture	Nominated	
2014	Two Days, One Night	Online Film Critics Society	Best Foreign Language Film	Won	
2014	Two Days, One Night	Online Film Critics Society	Best Director	Nominated	
2014	Two Days, One Night	Boston Society of Film Critics	Best Foreign Language Film	Won	
2014	Two Days, One Night	Denver Film Critics Society	Best Foreign Language Film	Won	
2014	Two Days, One Night	London Film Critics' Circle	Foreign Language Film of the Year	Nominated	
2015	Two Days, One Night	Broadcast Film Critics Association	Best Foreign Language Film	Nominated	
2016	Two Days, One Night	Argentine Film Critics Association	Best Foreign Language Film	Nominated	

== Other festival awards ==
Year	Nominated work	Film festival	Award	Result	Ref
1996	La Promesse	Festival International du Film Francophone de Namur	Bayard d'Or for Best Film	Won	
1996	La Promesse	Festival International du Film Francophone de Namur	Audience Award	Won	
1996	La Promesse	Valladolid International Film Festival	Golden Spike	Won	
1996	La Promesse	Valladolid International Film Festival	FIPRESCI Prize	Won	
2000	Rosetta	Flaiano International Prizes	Best Director	Won	
2003	The Son	Fajr International Film Festival	Crystal Simorgh for Best International Film	Won	
2005	L'Enfant	Valdivia International Film Festival	Best Film	Won	
2006		Telluride Film Festival	Silver Medallion	Won	
2008		Film by the Sea	Lifetime Achievement Award	Won	
2011		Venice Film Festival	Robert Bresson Prize	Won	
2011	The Kid with a Bike	Flaiano International Prizes	Best Director	Won	
2011		Film Fest Gent	Joseph Plateau Honorary Award	Won	
2014	Two Days, One Night	Sydney Film Festival	Sydney Film Prize	Won	
2015	Two Days, One Night	Traverse City Film Festival	Founders Prize for Best Drama	Won	
