= Joseph Plateau Award for Best Director =

- Awarded for: Excellence in Cinematic Direction Achievement
- Country: Belgium
- First award: 1987
- Most recent winner: Jean-Pierre and Luc Dardenne for L'Enfant (2005)

The Joseph Plateau Award for Best Director (Dutch: Joseph Plateauprijs voor Beste Regisseur) was an annual film award presented in Belgium to honor outstanding achievement in film directing. It was awarded from 1987 to 2005 as part of the Joseph Plateau Awards and was presented during the International Film Fest Gent.

The most awarded filmmakers were Jean-Pierre and Luc Dardenne, who won four awards, followed by Dominique Deruddere and Jaco Van Dormael with two awards each.

== Winners ==
=== 1980s ===
Year	Director(s)	English title	Original title
1987	Dominique Deruddere	Crazy Love	
1988	André Delvaux	The Abyss	L'Œuvre au noir
1989	Robbe De Hert	Blueberry Hill	

=== 1990s ===
Year	Director(s)	English title	Original title
1990	Dominique Deruddere	Wait Until Spring, Bandini	
1991	Jaco Van Dormael	Toto the Hero	Toto le Héros
1992	Harry Kümel	Eline Vere	
1993	Stijn Coninx	Daens	
1994	Marc-Henri Wajnberg	Just Friends	
1995	Frank Van Passel	Manneken Pis	
1996	Jaco Van Dormael	The Eighth Day	Le Huitième Jour
1997	Jean-Pierre and Luc Dardenne	La Promesse	
1998	Julien Vrebos	The Masked Ball	Le Bal masqué
1999	Patrice Toye	Rosie	

=== 2000s ===
Year	Director(s)	English title	Original title	Ref.
2000 (14th)	Jean-Pierre and Luc Dardenne	Rosetta		
2000 (14th)	Dominique Deruddere	Everybody's Famous!	Iedereen beroemd!	
2000 (14th)	Frédéric Fonteyne	An Affair of Love	Une liaison pornographique	
2001 (15th)	Lieven Debrauwer	Pauline & Paulette		
2001 (15th)	Gérard Corbiau	The King Is Dancing	Le Roi danse	
2001 (15th)	Robbe De Hert	The Publishers	Lijmen/Het Been	
2002 (16th)	Jean-Pierre and Luc Dardenne	The Son	Le Fils	
2002 (16th)	Danis Tanović	No Man's Land		
2002 (16th)	Frank Van Passel	Villa des Roses		
2003 (17th)	Erik Van Looy	The Memory of a Killer	De zaak Alzheimer	
2003 (17th)	Lucas Belvaux	On the Run	Cavale	
2003 (17th)	Lucas Belvaux	An Amazing Couple	Un couple épatant	
2003 (17th)	Lucas Belvaux	After the Life	Après la vie	
2003 (17th)	Stijn Coninx	Sea of Silence	Verder dan de maan	
2004 (18th)	Frédéric Fonteyne	Gilles' Wife	La Femme de Gilles	
2004 (18th)	Lieven Debrauwer	Sweet Jam	Confituur	
2004 (18th)	Felix van Groeningen	Steve + Sky		
2005 (19th)	Jean-Pierre and Luc Dardenne	L'Enfant		
2005 (19th)	Bouli Lanners	Ultranova		
2005 (19th)	Fien Troch	Someone Else's Happiness	Een ander zijn geluk	
