= Joseph Plateau Awards 2002 =

16th Joseph Plateau Awards

2003

Best Film:
The Son

The 16th Joseph Plateau Awards, given in 2003, honored the best Belgian filmmaking of 2002.

Jean-Pierre and Luc Dardenne's Le fils (The Son) won three awards: Best Film, Actor (Decleir) and Director.

== Winners ==
- Best Actor:
  - Olivier Gourmet - Le fils (The Son) and Une part de ciel (A Piece of Sky)
- Best Actress (tie):
  - Antje de Boeck - Hop
  - Els Dottermans - Meisje (Girl)
- Best Composer (tie):
  - Vincent D'Hondt - Hop
  - Daan Stuyven - Meisje (Girl)
- Best Director:
  - Jean-Pierre and Luc Dardenne - Le fils (The Son)
- Best Documentary:
  - Iran - sous le voile des apparences (Iran: Veiled Appearances)
- Best Film:
  - Le fils
- Best Screenplay:
  - No Man's Land - Danis Tanović
- Best Short Film:
  - Snapshot
- Box office award:
  - Alias
