= Les Films du Fleuve =

Film production company founded by Jean-Pierre and Luc Dardenne

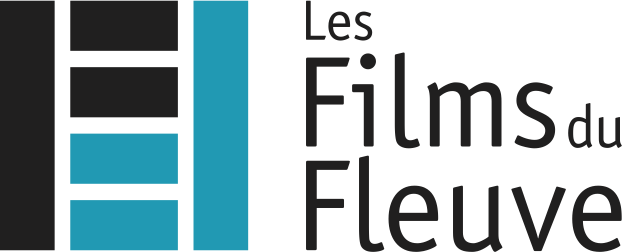
- Type: Private
- Industry: Film
- Founded: 1994
- Founders: Jean-Pierre Dardenne; Luc Dardenne
- Headquarters: Liège, Belgium
- Products: La Promesse; Rosetta; The Son; L'Enfant; Lorna's Silence; The Kid with a Bike; Rust and Bone; Two Days, One Night; I, Daniel Blake; Tori and Lokita

Les Films du Fleuve is a Belgian art-film production company owned by the Belgian filmmaking duo Dardenne brothers, Jean-Pierre and Luc Dardenne, and launched in 1994.

It has produced three Palme d'Or winning films: Rosetta (1999) and L'Enfant (2005) by the Dardenne brothers, and I, Daniel Blake (2016) by Ken Loach, and one Oscar-nominated film: Two Days, One Night (2014) by the Dardenne brothers, which earned Marion Cotillard a nomination for Best Actress at the 87th Academy Awards in 2015.

== History ==
In 1994, the Belgian filmmaking duo Dardenne brothers, Jean-Pierre and Luc Dardenne, launched the art-film production company Les Films du Fleuve in Liège, Belgium.

The company has produced three Palme d'Or winning films: Rosetta (1999) and L'Enfant (2005) by the Dardenne brothers, and I, Daniel Blake (2016) by Ken Loach, and one Oscar-nominated film: Two Days, One Night (2014) by the Dardenne brothers, which earned Marion Cotillard a nomination for Best Actress at the 87th Academy Awards in 2015, making her the first actor to be nominated for an Academy Award for a Belgian film.

== Filmography ==
=== 1990s ===
Year	Title	Director	Notes
1996	La Promesse	Jean-Pierre and Luc Dardenne	
1999	Rosetta	Jean-Pierre and Luc Dardenne	
1999	Les Siestes grenadine	Mahmoud Ben Mahmoud	

=== 2000s ===
Year	Title	Director	Notes
2000	La Devinière	Benoît Dervaux	
2001	The Milk of Human Kindness	Dominique Cabrera	
2002	The Son	Jean-Pierre and Luc Dardenne	
2003	Le Monde vivant	Eugène Green	
2003	The Mystery of the Yellow Room	Bruno Podalydès	
2003	Stormy Weather	Sólveig Anspach	
2003	Le Soleil assassiné	Abdelkrim Bahloul	
2005	L'Enfant	Jean-Pierre and Luc Dardenne	
2005	The Axe	Costa-Gavras	
2006	Vous êtes de la police?	Romuald Beugnon	
2006	The Colonel	Laurent Herbiet	
2007	Pourquoi on ne peut pas se voir dehors quand il fait beau	Bernard Bellefroid	
2007	Madonnen	Maria Speth	
2008	Lorna's Silence	Jean-Pierre and Luc Dardenne	
2009	Looking for Eric	Ken Loach	
2009	The Frontline	Renato De Maria	

=== 2010s ===
Year	Title	Director	Notes
2010	Route Irish	Ken Loach	
2011	The Minister	Pierre Schoeller	
2011	The Kid with a Bike	Jean-Pierre and Luc Dardenne	
2012	The Angels' Share	Ken Loach	
2012	Beyond the Hills	Cristian Mungiu	
2012	Rust and Bone	Jacques Audiard	
2013	Marina	Stijn Coninx	
2013	Playing Dead	Jean-Paul Salomé	
2014	À ciel ouvert	Mariana Otero	
2014	40-Love	Stéphane Demoustier	
2014	Jimmy's Hall	Ken Loach	
2014	The Price of Fame	Xavier Beauvois	
2014	Two Days, One Night	Jean-Pierre and Luc Dardenne	
2014	Wild Life	Cédric Kahn	
2014	Trois Journées d'août 1914	André Dartevelle	
2015	Les Cowboys	Thomas Bidegain	
2015	Diary of a Chambermaid	Benoît Jacquot	
2015	Long Live the Bride	Ascanio Celestini	
2015	Good Luck Sam	Farid Bentoumi	
2016	Achter de wolken	Cecilia Verheyden	
2016	The Dancer	Stéphanie Di Giusto	
2016	Graduation	Cristian Mungiu	
2016	Hedi	Mohamed Ben Attia	
2016	I, Daniel Blake	Ken Loach	
2016	Pericle	Stefano Mordini	
2016	Planetarium	Rebecca Zlotowski	
2016	The Son of Joseph	Eugène Green	
2016	The Unknown Girl	Jean-Pierre and Luc Dardenne	
2016	Vangelo	Pippo Delbono	
2017	The Elephant and the Butterfly	Amélie van Elmbt	
2017	Endangered Species	Gilles Bourdos	
2017	Loveless	Andrey Zvyagintsev	
2018	Carnivores	Jérémie Renier and Yannick Renier	
2018	Dear Son	Mohamed Ben Attia	
2018	Don't Shoot	Stijn Coninx	
2018	Fatwa	Mahmoud Ben Mahmoud	
2018	One Nation, One King	Pierre Schoeller	
2018	Paul Sanchez Is Back!	Patricia Mazuy	
2018	The Sisters Brothers	Jacques Audiard	
2019	Casanova, Last Love	Benoît Jacquot	
2019	Sorry We Missed You	Ken Loach	
2019	Young Ahmed	Jean-Pierre and Luc Dardenne	
2019	Suzanne and René	Maria Reggiani	

=== 2020s ===
Year	Title	Director	Notes
2020	Atarrabi & Mikelats	Eugène Green	
2020	Honey Cigar	Karim Aïnouz	
2020	Red Soil	Farid Bentoumi	
2021	Animals	Nabil Ben Yadir	
2021	La civil	Teodora Ana Mihai	
2021	My Night	Antoinette Boulat	
2022	Tori and Lokita	Jean-Pierre and Luc Dardenne	
2022	Harkis	Philippe Faucon	
2022	The Line	Ursula Meier	
2022	R.M.N.	Cristian Mungiu	
2022	Saturn Bowling	Patricia Mazuy	
2023	Jeanne du Barry	Maïwenn	
2023	The Old Oak	Ken Loach	
2023	Black Box	Aslı Özge	
2023	Holly	Fien Troch	
2023	Behind the Mountains	Mohamed Ben Attia	
2024	Julie Keeps Quiet	Leonardo Van Dijl	
2024	The Most Precious of Cargoes	Michel Hazanavicius	
2024	Langue étrangère	Claire Burger	
2025	Enzo	Robin Campillo	
2025	Adam's Interest	Laura Wandel	
2025	Young Mothers	Jean-Pierre and Luc Dardenne	
2025	Julian	Cato Kusters	
2025	Skiff	Cecilia Verheyden	
2025	Those Who Watch Over	Karima Saïdi	
2026	Heysel 85	Teodora Ana Mihai	
2026	Butterfly Jam	Kantemir Balagov	
2026	Diane in the Loop	Ann Sirot and Raphaël Balboni	
