= The Kid with a Bike =

- Theatrical release poster
- Directed by: Jean-Pierre Dardenne; Luc Dardenne
- Written by: Jean-Pierre Dardenne; Luc Dardenne
- Produced by: Jean-Pierre Dardenne; Luc Dardenne; Denis Freyd
- Starring: Thomas Doret; Cécile de France
- Cinematography: Alain Marcoen
- Edited by: Marie-Hélène Dozo
- Production company: Les Films du Fleuve
- Distributed by: Cinéart (Belgium); Diaphana Films (France)
- Release dates: 15 May 2011 (Cannes); 18 May 2011 (France)
- Running time: 87 minutes
- Countries: Belgium; France
- Language: French
- Budget: €5.8 million
- Box office: $5.2 million

The Kid with a Bike (French: Le gamin au vélo) is a 2011 drama film written and directed by Jean-Pierre and Luc Dardenne. Set in Seraing, Belgium, it tells the story of a 12-year-old boy (Thomas Doret) who turns to a woman (Cécile de France) for comfort after his father (Jérémie Renier) has abandoned him.

The film was produced through companies in Belgium and France. While The Kid with a Bike does not deviate from the naturalistic style of the Dardenne brothers' earlier works, a comparatively bright aesthetic was employed, as well as a screenplay inspired by fairy tales. Unusually for a film by the directors, it also uses music.

On 15 May 2011 The Kid with a Bike premiered at the Cannes Film Festival, where it was a co-winner of the Grand Prix.

== Plot ==
Cyril, a 12-year-old in a Liège children's home, attempts to call his father, who said he would only be there for a month, but gets no response. He makes a violent escape from the home and goes to his father's building, where a neighbor tells him his father's apartment is empty. When found by the caretakers Cyril grabs hold of a passing woman, Samantha, who says she doesn't mind. The caretakers take Cyril to the empty apartment, showing his father has abandoned him.

The next day, Samantha brings Cyril his bike. Cyril asks her to host him on weekends, she agrees and with her partner Gilles provide Cyril with a happy home. Still, his father's abandonment haunts him, even after discovering his father sold his bike. He confides in Samantha about wanting his father and, without official permission, she tracks him down and takes Cyril to see him. Cyril's father does not meet as agreed but they find him working at a restaurant, where Cyril asks why he has to stay at the home and his father gives no indication of wanting him back. Cyril's father tells Samantha he is now her problem, he has a new life and cannot raise Cyril now that his grandmother is dead. Samantha demands Cyril's father be honest with him and his father tells him not to see him again, causing Cyril to have a breakdown.

Cyril is taken under the wing of Wesker, a local gang leader, whom Samantha and Gilles warn him to stay away from. Cyril ignores their requests and begins staying out late with Wesker, straining the couple's relationship. Gilles loses patience with Cyril and leaves Samantha when she chooses Cyril over him, causing her upset. Cyril fails to understand Samantha's feelings and continues running wild. When Cyril refuses to go out with a friend and his family, Samantha suspects he is planning to meet Wesker in secret. When Samantha prevents Cyril from leaving, he screams he does not want to be with her anymore; she tells him to call the children's home but he won't be leaving the house. Cyril stabs her with a pair of scissors and goes to Wesker, who makes him beat and rob a newsstand owner and his son. Fearing discovery, Wesker forces Cyril to keep the stolen money and threatens to kill him if he tells anyone. Cyril tries giving the money to his father, but he does not want involvement. Dejected, Cyril apologetically returns to Samantha.

The robbery is settled by Cyril apologizing, but while the owner accepts, his son does not. Later, the son against his father's wishes confronts and chases after Cyril, who climbs a tree to get away but falls when struck by a thrown rock. Believing Cyril has died, the two discuss what lie to tell and how to dispose of the body when Cyril regains consciousness. He declines an ambulance and the two watch aghast as he rides away on his bike.

== Cast ==
- Thomas Doret as Cyril Catoul
- Cécile de France as Samantha, hair dresser and foster mother of Cyril
- Jérémie Renier as Guy Catoul, father of Cyril
- Fabrizio Rongione as Bookseller
- Egon Di Mateo as Wesker
- Olivier Gourmet as Café owner
- Myriem Akheddiou as the assistant

== Production ==
Luc Dardenne said that he and his brother Jean-Pierre had for a long time had the idea of a film about "a woman who helps a boy emerge from the violence that holds him prisoner." Writing the screenplay took one year including a few breaks. In the earliest drafts, the character Samantha was a doctor and not a hairdresser. The script was structured with a fairytale in mind, where the boy would lose his illusions and Samantha would appear as a fairy-like figure. By not explaining much about the characters' past and psychology, the brothers aimed to avoid sentimentality. Throughout the writing process the brothers strove to maintain a strong clarity in the overall work and to avoid gloom, which is why the brothers, according to Jean-Pierre, decided to omit "any form of vulgarity in the teenagers' language, even though they're street criminals".

The film is a co-production with 46% investment from its directors' Belgian company Les Films du Fleuve, 44% from its French Archipel 35, and 10% from Italy's Lucky Red. It received further funding from the CNC, Eurimages, Wallimage, Radio Télévision Belge de la Communauté Française, and the Belgian French Community.

Cécile de France was offered the role of Samantha soon after the screenplay was finished, as the brothers believed she would be able to portray the kindness of the character with her body and face alone. For the casting of the boy, Cyril, the production team held around 100 auditions. Thomas Doret was the fifth applicant the brothers met, and according to Jean-Pierre, "it clicked right away". The team rehearsed for a month on the actual sets in full costume.

The 55-day shoot commenced in Belgium in August 2010 and ended on 15 October. It was the first time the Dardenne brothers made a film in the summer. The film was made under the production title Délivrez-moi! which means "Set me free!"

Unusually for a film by the Dardenne brothers, there is music in the film. According to Luc, they hesitated for a long time, but eventually decided that music would serve the film's structure: "In a fairytale there has to be a development, with emotions and new beginnings. It seemed to us that music, at certain points, could act like a calming caress for Cyril."

== Release ==
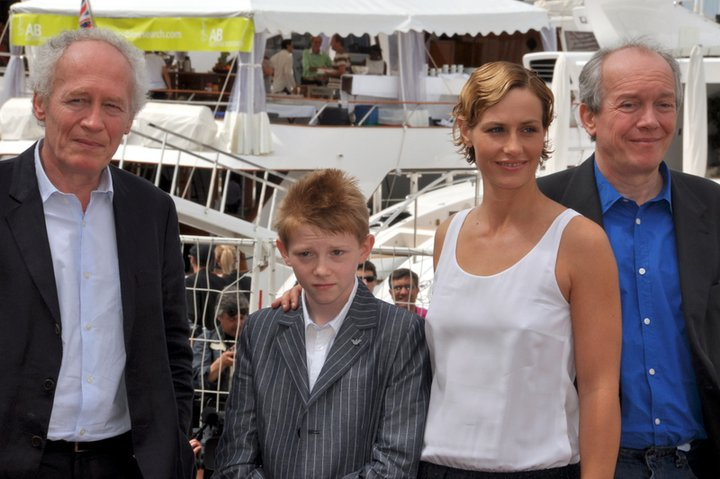
Jean-Pierre Dardenne, Thomas Doret, Cécile de France and Luc Dardenne at the Cannes Film Festival for the premiere of the film

The film premiered in competition on 15 May at the 2011 Cannes Film Festival. Cinéart distributed it in Belgium and Diaphana Films in France. The premiere in both countries took place on 18 May. In Belgium, the film was launched on 27 screens and entered the box-office chart as number six, with a weekend gross of 70,768 euro. In France, it was launched in 172 venues and had an attendance of 107,763 the opening week, which also resulted in a sixth place on the domestic chart. One week later the number of screens had been increased to 215, and the total attendance reached 209,725. In Italy, the film was released on 18 May through Lucky Red. Sundance Selects acquired the distribution rights for the United States. The film was distributed in the United Kingdom through Artificial Eye.

== Reception ==
=== Critical response ===
The film received acclaim. On Rotten Tomatoes it has an approval rating of 96% based on 119 reviews. The site's critical consensus said that the film "is a heart-wrenching, thematically and spiritually rich drama." On Metacritic, the film has a weighted average score of 87 out of 100, based on 33 reviews.

Jonathan Romney wrote in Screen Daily: "After the slightly sub-par Lorna's Silence (2008), the brothers are back on peerless form with this story of innocence betrayed and befriended, which must count as one of the best films about childhood since Kes – or for that matter Bicycle Thieves, to which it surely nods." Romney further commented: "Shooting as usual with cinematographer Alain Marcoen, and in their familiar stamping ground of Seraing, the brothers this time bring a somewhat different, airier look to their locations, more suburban than in the past. Marcoen's camerawork, also, is rather more free-wheeling than the tightly constrained (and often imitated) tightness of The Son." At the 2011 London Film Festival it was among Sight & Sound's 30 recommendations; according to them, "The Dardenne brothers may be the most consistently high-achieving filmmakers of our time – the kings, if you like, of poetic neorealism. Like all their films, Le Gamin au vélo (The Kid with a Bike) is near perfect." Upon its March 2012 UK release, Peter Bradshaw gave it (four stars out of 5) and said it "revive[s] the memory of De Sica's 1948 classic Bicycle Thieves"; it is a "heartfelt, boldly direct film composed in the social-realist key signature of C major, revisiting the film-makers' classic themes of parenthood, trust and love." Conversely, another reviewer for the conservative magazine Spiked called it "formulaic" and "superficial".

Keith Uhlich of Time Out New York named The Kid with a Bike the fourth-best film of 2012, calling it "another remarkable, unsentimental stunner [from the Dardenne brothers]."

=== Box office ===
The Kid with a Bike grossed $1,389,524 in North America, along with $3,786,899 in other countries, for a worldwide total of $5,176,423.

=== Accolades ===
The film received the Grand Prix at the Cannes film Festival, which is the festival's second most prestigious award. The win was shared with the Turkish film Once Upon a Time in Anatolia. The film received a nomination at the 69th Golden Globe Awards for Best Foreign Language Film and at the Satellite Awards 2011 in the same category. It was also nominated at the Independent Spirit Awards for Best International Film. The St. Louis Gateway Film Critics Association nominated the film for Best Foreign-Language Film, but it lost to The Intouchables.

It received eight nominations at the 2nd Magritte Awards, including Best Film and Best Director for Jean-Pierre and Luc Dardenne. It went on to win Most Promising Actor for Thomas Doret. The film was named among the National Board of Review's Top 5 Foreign Language Films of 2012. It won the Best Foreign Language Film at the San Diego Film Critics Society Awards 2012.
