= San Francisco Bay Area Film Critics Circle Award for Best Foreign Language Film =

Annual US film award

The San Francisco Film Critics Circle Award for Best Foreign Language Film, given by the San Francisco Film Critics Circle, honors the finest achievements in filmmaking.

== Winners ==
=== 2000s ===
Year	Winner	Country	Director(s)
2002	And Your Mother Too (Y tu mamá también)	Mexico	Alfonso Cuarón
2003	The Son (Le fils)	Belgium	Jean-Pierre and Luc Dardenne
2004	Maria Full of Grace (Maria, llena eres de gracias)	Colombia/USA	Joshua Marston
2005	Hidden (Caché)	Austria/France	Michael Haneke
2006	Pan's Labyrinth (El laberinto del fauno)	Mexico	Guillermo del Toro
2007	The Diving Bell and the Butterfly (Le scaphandre et le papillon)	France/USA	Julian Schnabel
2008	Let the Right One In (Låt den rätte komma in)	Sweden	Tomas Alfredson
2009	You, the Living (Du levande)	Sweden	Roy Andersson

=== 2010s ===
Year	Winner	Country	Director(s)
2010	Mother (Madeo)	South Korea	Bong Joon-ho
2011	Certified Copy (Copie conforme)	France	Abbas Kiarostami
2012	Amour	Austria/France/Germany	Michael Haneke
2013	Blue is the Warmest Color (La Vie d'Adèle – Chapitres 1 & 2)	France	Abdellatif Kechiche
2014	Ida	Poland/Denmark	Paweł Pawlikowski
2015	Son of Saul (Saul Fia)	Hungary	László Nemes
2016	The Handmaiden (Agassi)	South Korea	Park Chan-wook
2017	BPM (Beats Per Minute)	France	Robin Campillo
2018	Roma	Mexico	Alfonso Cuaron
2019	Parasite	South Korea	Bong Joon-ho

=== 2020s ===
Year	Winner	Country	Director(s)
2020	Another Round	Denmark	Thomas Vinterberg
2021	Drive My Car	Japan	Ryusuke Hamaguchi
