= Olivier Gourmet =

Belgian actor

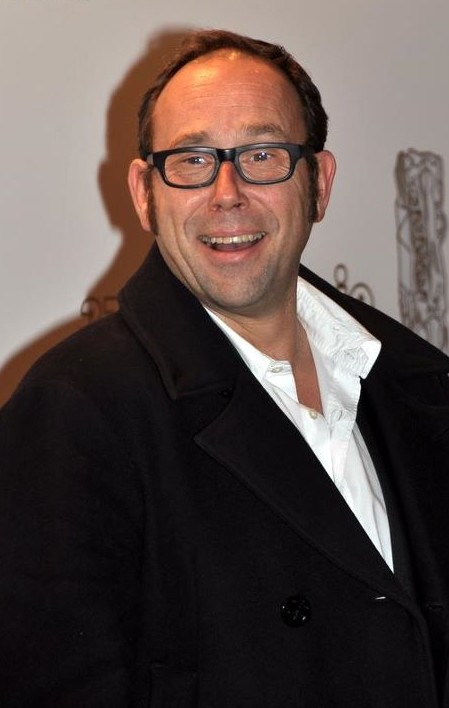
- Olivier Gourmet in 2012
- Born: 22 July 1963 (age 63); Namur, Belgium
- Occupation: Actor
- Years active: 1990–present

Olivier Gourmet (born 22 July 1963) is a Belgian actor.

Gourmet was born in Namur. He won the Best Actor award at the 2002 Cannes Film Festival for his role in Le Fils by Jean-Pierre and Luc Dardenne. He also appeared in La Promesse, Rosetta and L'Enfant.

== Selected filmography ==
Year	Title	Role	Notes
1996	The Eighth Day	The father at the restaurant	
1996	La promesse	Roger	Namur Film Festival Best Actor Award
1998	Those Who Love Me Can Take the Train	Bernard	
1999	Rosetta	The Boss	Nominated—Joseph Plateau Award for Best Actor
1999	Nadia and the Hippos		
2000	Nationale 7	René	
2001	Sur mes lèvres		
2001	A Moment of Happiness	Father	
2001	The Milk of Human Kindness	Doctor Gérald Cafarelli	
2002	The Son	Olivier	Cannes Film Festival Best Actor Award; Fajr Film Festival Best Actor Award; Joseph Plateau Award for Best Actor; Nominated—European Film Award for Best Actor
2002	A Piece of Sky	Joanna's Lawyer	Joseph Plateau Award for Best Actor
2002	Safe Conduct	Roger Richebé	
2002	Peau d'Ange		
2003	Time of the Wolf	Koslowski	
2003	Where Is Madame Catherine?	Eric	
2004	Le pont des Arts	Jean-Astolphe Méréville	
2005	L'Enfant	Policier en civil	
2005	Le Couperet		
2005	Burnt Out		
2006	The Colonel	Colonel Raoul Duplan	
2006	Les Brigades du Tigre		
2006	Congorama	Michel Roy	Jutra Award for Best Actor; Nominated—Genie Award for Best Actor
2007	Hidden Love	Morris	
2008	Mesrine	Le commissaire Broussard	
2008	Lorna's Silence	L'inspecteur	
2008	Home	Michel	
2009	Angel at Sea	Le père	Karlovy Vary Film Festival Best Actor Award; Nominated—Magritte Award for Best Actor
2009	Altiplano	Max	
2009	Park Benches	Maurice Begeard	
2010	Nothing to Declare	Le prêtre de Chimay	
2010	Black Venus	Réaux	
2011	The Minister	Bertrand Saint-Jean	Magritte Award for Best Actor; Mar del Plata International Film Festival Award for Best Actor; Nominated—César Award for Best Actor; Nominated—Globes de Cristal Award for Best Actor; Nominated—Lumière Award for Best Actor
2011	The Kid with a Bike	Le patron du bar	
2011	My Wife's Romance	Chollet	
2013	Grand Central	Gilles	Nominated—César Award for Best Supporting Actor; Nominated—Magritte Award for Best Supporting Actor
2013	Violette	Jacques Guérin	
2013	The Marchers	Dubois	Nominated—Magritte Award for Best Supporting Actor
2014	Two Days, One Night	Jean-Marc	
2014	Madame Bovary	Monsieur Rouault	
2014	The Gate	Marsac	
2014	40-Love	Jérôme Sauvage	
2015	L'Affaire SK1	Bougon	
2015	The Night Watchman	Franck	
2015	April and the Extraordinary World	Paul	
2015	L'Odeur de la mandarine	Charles	
2015	En mai, fais ce qu'il te plait	Paul	
2016	Chocolat	Joseph Oller	
2016	The Unknown Girl	Lambert's son	
2016	The Woman in the Silver Plate	Stéphane	
2016	A Wedding	André	
2017	The Midwife	Paul Baron	
2017	Above the Law	Frank Valken	Nominated—Magritte Award for Best Actor
2017	The Young Karl Marx	Pierre Proudhon	
2021	Simone Veil, A Woman of the Century		
2023	Mayhem!	Narong	
2023	Turtles (Les Tortues)	Henri Janssens	
2025	Néro the Assassin	Horace (monk)	Netflix series
