= Joseph Plateau Awards 1999 =

13th Joseph Plateau Awards

1999

Best Film:
Rosie

The 13th Joseph Plateau Awards honoured the best Belgian filmmaking of 1998 and 1999.

== Winners and nominees ==
=== Best Belgian Actor ===
Benoît Poelvoorde – The Carriers Are Waiting (Les convoyeurs attendent)

- Dirk Roofthooft – Rosie
- Frank Vercruyssen – Rosie

=== Best Belgian Actress ===
Aranka Coppens – Rosie

- Pascale Bal – The Wall (Le mur)
- Sara de Roo – Rosie

=== Best Belgian Director ===
Patrice Toye – Rosie

- Danny Deprez – The Ball (De bal)
- Benoît Mariage – The Carriers Are Waiting (Les convoyeurs attendent)

=== Best Belgian Screenplay 1984–1999 ===
Toto le héros – Jaco Van Dormael

- La promesse – Jean-Pierre and Luc Dardenne
- Man Bites Dog – André Bonzel, Rémy Belvaux, Benoît Poelvoorde

=== Best Belgian Film ===
Rosie

- The Ball (De bal)
- The Carriers Are Waiting (Les convoyeurs attendent)

=== Best Belgian Series – Drama ===
Heterdaad

- Recht op recht
- Windkracht 10

=== Box Office Award ===
Kabout Plop: De kabouterschat

=== Joseph Plateau Award of Honour ===
Bonnie Arnold
Sandra Bullock
Peter Greenaway

=== Joseph Plateau Life Achievement Award ===
Stanley Donen
Irwin Winkler
