= List of Belgian submissions for the Academy Award for Best International Feature Film =

Best International Feature Film submissions from Belgium

Highlights
- Debut: 1967
- Submissions: 51
- Nominations: 8
- Oscar winners: none

Belgium has submitted films for the Academy Award for Best International Feature Film (Note: The category was previously named the Academy Award for Best Foreign Language Film, but this was changed to the Academy Award for Best International Feature Film in April 2019, after the Academy deemed the word "Foreign" to be outdated.) since 1967. The award is handed out annually by the United States Academy of Motion Picture Arts and Sciences to a feature-length motion picture produced outside the United States that contains primarily non-English dialogue. The "Best Foreign Language Film" category was not created until the 1956 Academy Awards, in which a competitive Academy Award of Merit, known as the Best Foreign Language Film Award, was created for non-English speaking films, and has been given annually since. Between 1947 and 1955, the academy presented a non-competitive Honorary Award for the best foreign language films released in the United States.

As of 2026, Belgium has been nominated eight times. It most recent nominated film was Close (2022).

== Submissions ==
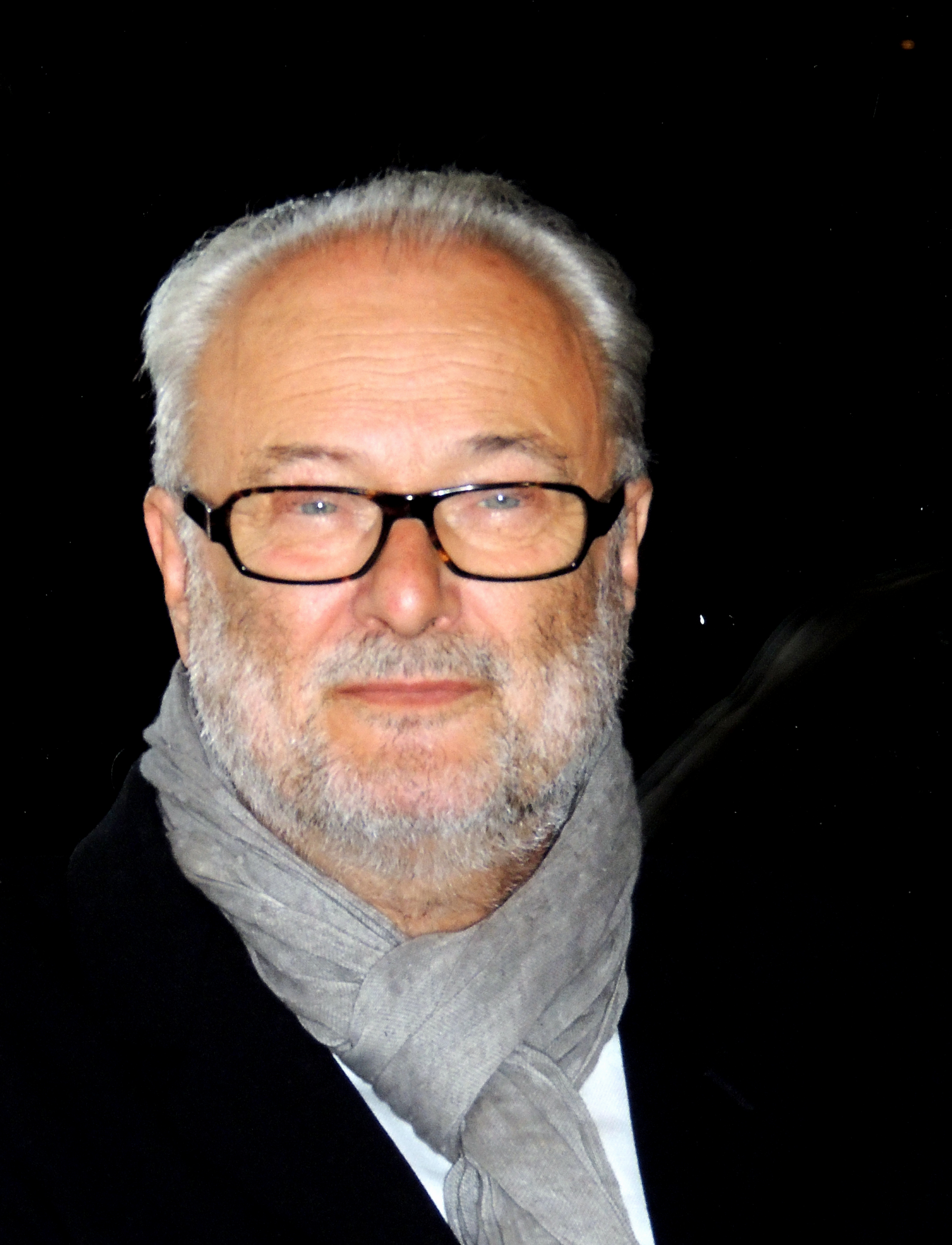
Gérard Corbiau directed two Belgian films nominated for the award.

The Academy of Motion Picture Arts and Sciences has invited the film industries of various countries to submit their best film for the Academy Award for Best International Feature Film since 1956. The International Feature Film Committee oversees the process and reviews all the submitted films. Following this, they vote via secret ballot to determine the five nominees for the award.

Even though Belgium was nominated eight times, two-times Palme d'Or winners and acclaimed Belgian filmmakers Jean-Pierre and Luc Dardenne were never nominated. They hold the record of most submitted directors, with 5 films selected to represent the country: Rosetta (1999), The Son (2002), The Child (2005), Two Days, One Night (2014) and Young Mothers (2025). However, French actress Marion Cotillard was nominated for the Academy Award for Best Actress for Two Days, One Night.

Two of the nominees were directed by Gérard Corbiau: The Music Teacher (1988) and Farinelli (1994). The six other Belgian filmmakers to have films accepted as nominees were: Jacques Boigelot's Peace in the Fields (1970), Stijn Coninx's Daens (1993), Dominique Deruddere's Everybody's Famous! (2000), Michaël R. Roskam's Bullhead (2011), Felix van Groeningen's The Broken Circle Breakdown (2012), and Lukas Dhont's Close (2022).

Jaco Van Dormael's The Brand New Testament (2015) and Laura Wandel's Playground (2021) both advanced to the December semifinalist shortlists, but were not nominated.

Below is a list of the films that have been submitted by Belgium for review by the academy for the award by year and the respective Academy Awards ceremony.

Year (Ceremony)	Film title used in nomination	Original title	Language(s)	Director(s)	Result
1967 (40th)	Le Départ		French	Jerzy Skolimowski	Not nominated
1969 (42nd)	Palaver		Swahili, Dutch, French, English, German, Latin	Emile Degelin	Not nominated
1970 (43rd)	Peace in the Fields	Paix sur les champs	French	Jacques Boigelot	Nominated
1972 (45th)	The Lonely Killers	Les tueurs fous	French	Boris Szulzinger	Not nominated
1974 (47th)	The Conscript	De loteling	Dutch	Roland Verhavert	Not nominated
1976 (49th)	High Street	Rue Haute	French	André Ernotte	Not nominated
1977 (50th)	Rubens	Rubens, schilder en diplomaat	Dutch	Roland Verhavert	Not nominated
1979 (52nd)	Woman in a Twilight Garden	Een vrouw tussen hond en wolf	Dutch	André Delvaux	Not nominated
1981 (54th)	Le Grand Paysage d'Alexis Droeven		French	Jean-Jacques Andrien	Not nominated
1982 (55th)	Minuet	Menuet	Dutch	Lili Rademakers	Not nominated
1985 (58th)	Dust		French, English	Marion Hänsel	Not nominated
1986 (59th)	Jumping	Springen	Dutch	Jean-Pierre De Decker	Not nominated
1987 (60th)	The Cruel Embrace	Les noces barbares	French	Marion Hänsel	Not nominated
1988 (61st)	The Music Teacher	Le maître de musique	French	Gérard Corbiau	Nominated
1989 (62nd)	The Sacrament	Het Sacrament	Dutch	Hugo Claus	Not nominated
1991 (64th)	Toto the Hero	Toto le héros	French	Jaco Van Dormael	Not nominated
1992 (65th)	Daens		Flemish, Dutch, French, Latin, Spanish	Stijn Coninx	Nominated
1993 (66th)	Just Friends		Dutch, French	Marc-Henri Wajnberg	Not nominated
1994 (67th)	Farinelli	Farinelli, Il Castrato	Italian, French	Gérard Corbiau	Nominated
1995 (68th)	Manneken Pis	Manneken Pis	Dutch	Frank Van Passel	Not nominated
1996 (69th)	The Eighth Day	Le huitième jour	French	Jaco Van Dormael	Not nominated
1997 (70th)	My Life in Pink	Ma vie en rose	French	Alain Berliner	Not nominated
1998 (71st)	Rosie		Dutch	Patrice Toye	Not nominated
1999 (72nd)	Rosetta		French	Jean-Pierre and Luc Dardenne	Not nominated
2000 (73rd)	Everybody's Famous!	Iedereen beroemd!	Flemish, English, Spanish	Dominique Deruddere	Nominated
2001 (74th)	Pauline & Paulette		Dutch, French	Lieven Debrauwer	Not nominated
2002 (75th)	The Son	Le fils	French	Jean-Pierre and Luc Dardenne	Not nominated
2003 (76th)	Sea of Silence	Verder dan de maan	Dutch	Stijn Coninx	Not nominated
2004 (77th)	The Alzheimer Case	De zaak Alzheimer	Dutch, French, Flemish	Erik Van Looy	Not nominated
2005 (78th)	The Child	L'Enfant	French	Jean-Pierre and Luc Dardenne	Not nominated
2006 (79th)	Someone Else's Happiness	Een ander zijn geluk	Dutch	Fien Troch	Not nominated
2007 (80th)	Ben X		Flemish, Dutch	Nic Balthazar	Not nominated
2008 (81st)	Eldorado		French	Bouli Lanners	Not nominated
2009 (82nd)	The Misfortunates	De helaasheid der dingen	Dutch, Flemish	Felix van Groeningen	Not nominated
2010 (83rd)	Illegal	Illègal	French, Russian, English	Olivier Masset-Depasse	Not nominated
2011 (84th)	Bullhead	Rundskop	Dutch, French, Limburgish, West Flemish	Michaël R. Roskam	Nominated
2012 (85th)	Our Children	À perdre la raison	French, Arabic	Joachim Lafosse	Not nominated
2013 (86th)	The Broken Circle Breakdown	Alabama Monroe	Flemish, English, Dutch	Felix van Groeningen	Nominated
2014 (87th)	Two Days, One Night	Deux jours, une nuit	French	Jean-Pierre and Luc Dardenne	Not nominated
2015 (88th)	The Brand New Testament	Le Tout Nouveau Testament	French	Jaco Van Dormael	Made shortlist
2016 (89th)	The Ardennes	D'Ardennen	Flemish, French, Dutch	Robin Pront	Not nominated
2017 (90th)	Racer and the Jailbird	Le Fidèle	Flemish, French, Dutch	Michaël R. Roskam	Not nominated
2018 (91st)	Girl		Flemish, Dutch, French, English	Lukas Dhont	Not nominated
2019 (92nd)	Our Mothers	Nuestras madres	Spanish	César Díaz	Not nominated
2020 (93rd)	Working Girls	Filles de joie	French	Frédéric Fonteyne and Anne Paulicevich	Not nominated
2021 (94th)	Playground	Un monde	French	Laura Wandel	Made shortlist
2022 (95th)	Close		French, Dutch	Lukas Dhont	Nominated
2023 (96th)	Omen	Augure	French	Baloji	Not nominated
2024 (97th)	Julie Keeps Quiet	Julie zwijgt	Dutch, French	Leonardo Van Dijl	Not nominated
2025 (98th)	Young Mothers	Jeunes mères	French	Jean-Pierre and Luc Dardenne	Not nominated
2026 (99th)	Coward		French, Dutch	Lukas Dhont	Pending

== See also ==
- List of Academy Award-winning foreign language films
- List of Academy Award winners and nominees for Best International Feature Film
- List of countries by number of Academy Awards for Best International Feature Film
- Cinema of Belgium
