= Joseph Plateau Awards 1997 =

11th Joseph Plateau Awards

1997

Best Film:
La promesse

The 11th Joseph Plateau Awards honoured the best Belgian filmmaking of 1996 and 1997.

== Winners and nominees ==
=== Best Belgian Actor ===
Jan Decleir - Character (Karakter)

- Stany Crets - Alles moet weg
- Peter Van den Begin - Alles moet weg

=== Best Belgian Actress ===
Sophie Leboutte - La promesse

- Inge De Waele - La Sicilia
- Sabrina Leurquin - Gaston's War

=== Best Belgian Director ===
Jean-Pierre and Luc Dardenne - La promesse

- Alain Berliner - My Life in Pink (Ma vie en rose)
- Robbe De Hert - Gaston's War

=== Best Belgian Film ===
La promesse

- Character (Karakter)
- Alles moet weg

=== Box Office Award ===
My Life in Pink (Ma vie en rose)
La promesse

=== Joseph Plateau Life Achievement Award ===
Gina Lollobrigida
Sydney Pollack
David Puttnam
