= National Society of Film Critics Award for Best Foreign Language Film =

Cinematographic award

- Description: Annual film award recognizing outstanding achievement in non-English language cinema
- Country: United States
- Presented by: National Society of Film Critics

The National Society of Film Critics Award for Best Foreign Language Film is one of the annual awards given by the National Society of Film Critics since its inception in 1990.

== Winners ==
=== 1990s ===
Year	English title	Original title	Country	Director
1990	Ariel		Finland	Aki Kaurismäki
1991	The Double Life of Veronique	La Double Vie de Véronique	France / Poland	Krzysztof Kieślowski
1992	Raise the Red Lantern	Da hong deng long gao gao gua	China	Zhang Yimou
1993	The Story of Qiu Ju	Qiu Ju da guan si	China	Zhang Yimou
1994	Three Colors: Red	Trois couleurs: Rouge	France / Poland	Krzysztof Kieślowski
1995	Wild Reeds	Les Roseaux sauvages	France	André Téchiné
1996	La Cérémonie		France	Claude Chabrol
1997	La Promesse		Belgium	Jean-Pierre and Luc Dardenne
1998	Taste of Cherry	Ta'm e guilass	Iran	Abbas Kiarostami
1999	Autumn Tale	Conte d'automne	France	Eric Rohmer

=== 2000s ===
Year	English title	Original title	Country	Director
2000	Not awarded because the year's best film is a foreign language film (Yi Yi)			
2001	In the Mood for Love	Fa yeung nin wa	Hong Kong	Wong Kar-wai
2002	Y tu mamá también		Mexico	Alfonso Cuarón
2003	The Man Without a Past	Mies vailla menneisyyttä	Finland	Aki Kaurismäki
2004	Moolaadé		Burkina Faso/Cameroon/France	Ousmane Sembène
2005	Head-On	Gegen die Wand	Germany / Turkey	Fatih Akin
2006	Not awarded because the year's best film is a foreign language film (Pan's Labyrinth)			
2007	4 Months, 3 Weeks and 2 Days	4 luni, 3 săptămâni și 2 zile	Romania	Cristian Mungiu
2008	Not awarded because the year's best film is a foreign language film (Waltz with Bashir)			
2009	Summer Hours	L'Heure d'été	France	Olivier Assayas

=== 2010s ===
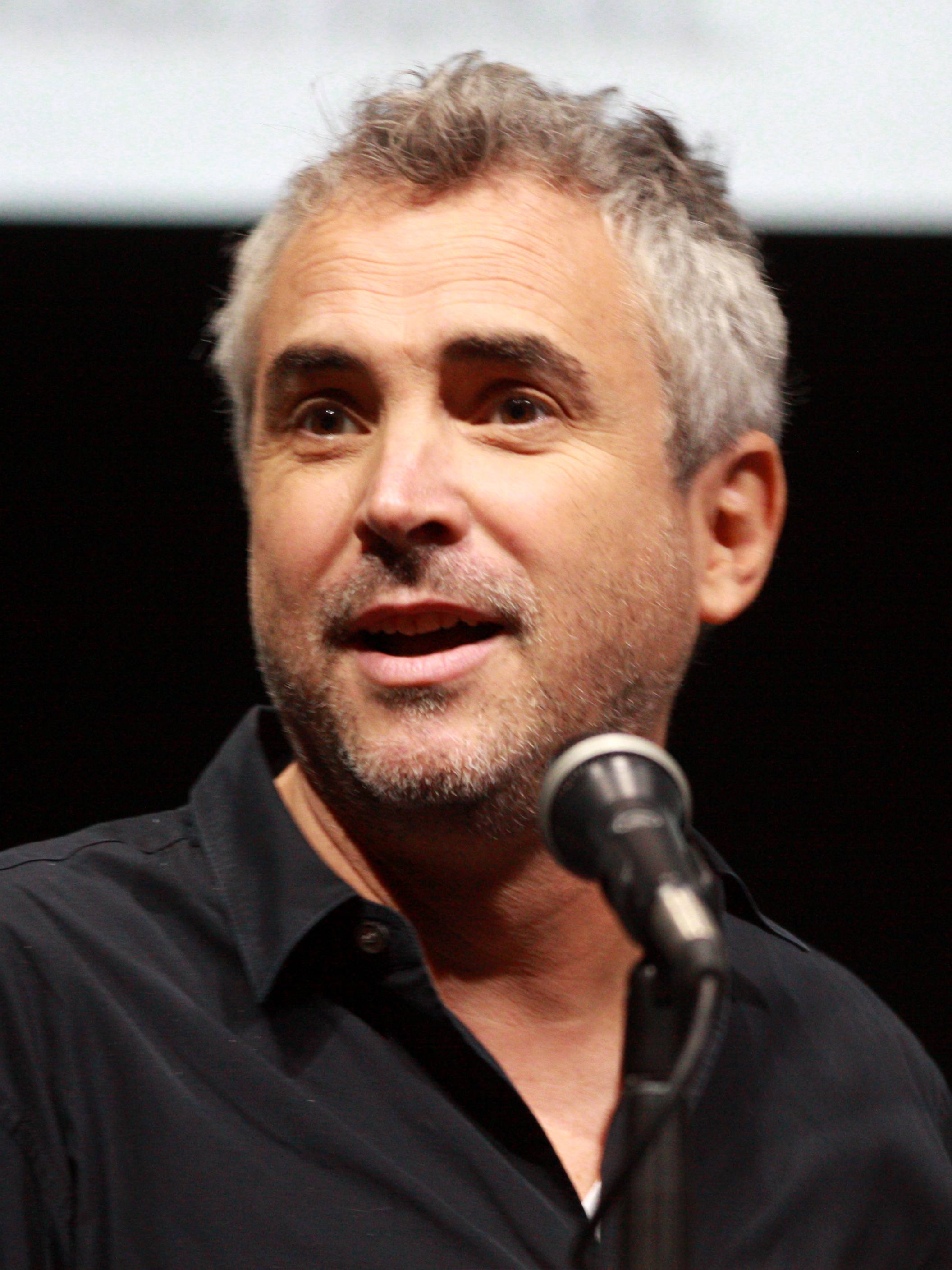
Alfonso Cuarón

Year	English title	Original title	Country	Director
2010	Carlos		France / Germany	Olivier Assayas
2011	A Separation	Jodái-e Náder az Simin	Iran	Asghar Farhadi
2012	Not awarded because the year's best film is a foreign language film (Amour)			
2013	Blue Is the Warmest Colour	La Vie d'Adèle – Chapitres 1 & 2	France	Abdellatif Kechiche
2014	Not awarded because the year's best film is a foreign language film (Goodbye to Language)			
2015	Timbuktu	Timbuktu	Mauritania	Abderrahmane Sissako
2016	Toni Erdmann		Germany	Maren Ade
2017	Graduation	Bacalaureat	Romania	Cristian Mungiu
2018	Roma		Mexico	Alfonso Cuarón
2019	Not awarded because the year's best film was a foreign language film (Parasite)			

=== 2020s ===
Year	English title	Original title	Country	Director
2020	Collective	Colectiv	Romania / Luxembourg	Alexander Nanau
2021	Not awarded because the year's best film was a foreign language film (Drive My Car)			
2022	EO	IO	Poland/Italy	Jerzy Skolimowski
2023	Fallen Leaves	Kuolleet lehdet	Finland	Aki Kaurismäki
2024	All We Imagine as Light	Prabhayaay Ninachathellam	India	Payal Kapadia
2025	The Secret Agent	O Agente Secreto	Brazil	Kleber Mendonça Filho

== Superlatives ==
=== Countries with more than two wins ===
- France – 8
- Finland - 3
- Germany – 3
- Poland - 3
- Romania – 3

=== Directors with multiple wins ===
- Aki Kaurismäki (Finland) – 3
- Olivier Assayas (France) – 2
- Alfonso Cuarón (Mexico) – 2
- Krzysztof Kieślowski (Poland) – 2
- Cristian Mungiu (Romania) – 2
- Zhang Yimou (China) – 2
