= Fabrizio Rongione =

Belgian screenwriter, film producer and actor

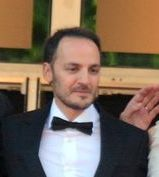
- Fabrizio Rongione at the 2014 Cannes Film Festival
- Born: 3 March 1973 (age 52); Brussels, Belgium
- Occupations: Actor, screenwriter, film producer
- Website: fabriziorongione.com

Fabrizio Rongione (born 3 March 1973) is a Belgian-Italian screenwriter, film producer and actor.

== Career ==
Rongione was born in Brussels, Belgium, in a family of Italian origin. He collaborated with Jean-Pierre and Luc Dardenne in Rosetta (1999), L’Enfant (2005), Lorna's Silence (2008), The Kid with a Bike (2011), Two Days, One Night (2014) and The Unknown Girl (2016). In 2002 he founded the film production company Eklektik Productions with Nicolas de Borman, Samuel Tilman and Stéphane Heymans.

Rongione hosted the Magritte Awards ceremony for two consecutive years in 2013 and 2014, and again in 2018.

== Selected filmography ==
=== Film ===
Year	Title	Role	Notes
1999	Rosetta	Riquet	
2002	The Words of My Father	Zeno	Golden Goblet Award for Best Newcomer
2005	L'Enfant	Jeune Bandit	
2006	Nema problema	Maxime	
2008	Lorna's Silence	Fabio	
2008	Passe-passe	Canolo	
2010	The Front Line	Piero	
2011	The Kid with a Bike	Bookseller	
2012	Diaz – Don't Clean Up This Blood	Nick Janssen	
2013	The Nun	Father Morante	
2013	Violette	Yvon Belaval	
2014	La Sapienza	Alexandre Schmidt	
2014	Two Days, One Night	Manu Bya	Magritte Award for Best Actor
2016	Le Fils de Joseph	Joseph	
2016	The Unknown Girl	Mathias	
2016	Children of the Night	Joseph	
2017	Don't Tell Her	Alain Grégoire	
2017	The Benefit of the Doubt	David	
2019	Romulus & Remus: The First King	Lars	
2019	Rosa Pietra e Stella	Tarek	
2020	Rose Island	Monsieur Carlozzi	
2021	Azor	Yvan	
2021	Happening	Dr. Ravinsky	
2022	Flowing	Thomas	
2023	The Order of Time	Jacob	
2023	Amal	Nabil	Nominated—Magritte Award for Best Supporting Actor
2024	The Flood †	TBA	

Key
†	Denotes film or TV productions that have not yet been released

=== Television ===
Title	Year	Role	Notes
Mafiosa	2006–2008	Rémi Andréani	TV series, 14 episodes
A French Village	2009–2017	Marcel Larcher	TV series, 44 episodes
Black Spot	2019	Simon Lefranc	TV series, 1 episode
Unit 42	2019	Pierre Remacle	TV series, 2 episodes
La rebelle: Les aventures de la jeune George Sand	2025	Henri de Latouche	Upcoming TV series

== Theatre ==
=== Actor ===
- 1997 : Vous permettez, Hugo ? by Tadeusz Różewicz, dir. Olivier Musenfarth - Brussels
- 1997 : Le Piège by Tadeusz Różewicz, dir. Serenella Morelli : Franz Kafka
- 1998 : Bent by Martin Sherman, dir. Derek Goldby - Brussels, Paris
- 1999: Ferdydurke by Witold Gombrowicz, dir. Elvire Brison : Mientus - Brussels
- 1999 : The Red and the Black by Stendhal, adaptation by Jacques De Decker, dir. Michel Wright : Julien Sorel - Brussels
- 1999 : Egmont by Goethe, dir. Jean-Claude Idée - Brussels
- 2000 : Foudres, dir. Véronique Van Meerbeeck
- 2001 : The Open Couple by Dario Fo, dir. Daniela Bisconti - Brussels
- 2002-2003 : C'était Bonaparte, dir. Robert Hossein : Napoleon - Paris
- 2005 : La Princesse de Babylone, dir. José Besprosvany - Schaerbeek
- 2005 : Papiers d’Arménie, dir. Caroline Safarian - Brussels
- 2005-2007 : The Game of Love and Chance by Marivaux, dir. Dominique Serron - Brussels
- 2007 : One for the Road by Harold Pinter, dir. Marcel Gonzalez and Vincent Bruno - Brussels
- 2007 : Une rencontre by Fabrice Gardin, dir. Claude Henuset - Brussels
- 2008 : L'assassin habite au 21, dir. Claude Henuset, from Stanislas-André Steeman : Ginger Lawson - Brussels
- 2013 : Le Cid by Pierre Corneille, dir. Dominique Serron : Rodrigue

=== Actor, author and director ===
- 1998 : Les Fléaux, cowritten and co dir. with Samuel Tilman - Brussels, Paris
- 2001 : John and the wonderful’s, collective writing, co dir. with Samuel Tilman - Brussels
- 2002-2003 : À genoux, one man show, cowritten with Samuel Tilman, Samuel Tilman and Marcel Gonzalez - Brussels, Festival d’Avignon
- 2009 : On vit peu mais on meurt longtemps, one man show, cowritten and co dir. with Samuel Tilman - Brussels, tour Belgium and France

== Awards ==
- 1998 : Grand Prix and Prix du public at Festival du rire, Brussels for Les Fléaux
- 2002 : Prix du Théâtre for best one man show for A genoux
