= L'Enfant (film) =

2005 film by Luc Dardenne, Jean-Pierre Dardenne

- Theatrical poster
- Directed by: Dardenne brothers
- Written by: Dardenne brothers
- Produced by: Dardenne brothers Denis Freyd
- Starring: Jérémie Renier; Déborah François
- Cinematography: Alain Marcoen
- Edited by: Marie-Hélène Dozo
- Production company: Les Films du Fleuve
- Distributed by: Cinéart
- Release dates: 17 May 2005 (Cannes); 14 September 2005 (Belgium)
- Running time: 91 minutes
- Country: Belgium
- Language: French
- Budget: €3.6 million
- Box office: $5.5 million

L'Enfant (English: The Child) is a 2005 Belgian film directed by Jean-Pierre and Luc Dardenne, starring Jérémie Renier and Déborah François. The film was released under its French title in the US, and as The Child in the UK.

It won the Palme d'Or at the 2005 Cannes Film Festival, among other accolades. In 2017, the film was named the fourteenth "Best Film of the 21st Century So Far" by The New York Times.

== Plot ==
Bruno, 20, and Sonia, 18, are surviving on her welfare cheques and Bruno's petty crimes when Sonia becomes pregnant. While Sonia is absent, Bruno sells their baby to a black market adoption ring to make some quick cash. He tells Sonia, telling her that they can simply "make" another baby, but Sonia is sickened and faints.

Faced with Sonia's shock, and feeling regret for his mistake, Bruno buys the child back at a premium—but, after being turned away by Sonia, his mounting debts lead Bruno down a quick path to desperation. He also learns Sonia is pressing charges. He winds up in prison, and Sonia visits him, sharing a moment of despair.

== Cast ==
- Jérémie Renier as Bruno
- Déborah François as Sonia
- Jérémie Segard as Steve
- Fabrizio Rongione
- Olivier Gourmet

== Reception ==
=== Critical response ===
L'Enfant received critical acclaim. Review aggregation website Rotten Tomatoes gives it an 86% approval rating, based on 106 reviews, with an average score of 7.5/10. The site's consensus reads, "The Dardennes continue to excel at presenting works of rigorous naturalism, with detached observations of authentic characters that nevertheless resonate with complex moral issues.". On Metacritic, which assigns a rating out of 100 to reviews from mainstream critics, the film received an average score of 87, based on 34 reviews, indicating "universal acclaim".

=== Accolades ===
L'Enfant won the Palme d'Or in 2005 Cannes Film Festival, making directors Jean-Pierre Dardenne and Luc Dardenne twice winners of the Palme d'Or, having won the award previously in 1999 with Rosetta. The film received the André Cavens Award for Best Film by the Belgian Film Critics Association (UCC). It was also nominated for Best Film and Best Actor (for Jérémie Renier) at the European Film Awards.

The film was chosen as Belgium's official entry for the Academy Award for Best Foreign Language Film at the 78th Academy Awards, but did not secure a nomination.

Award	Date of ceremony	Category	Recipient(s)	Result	Ref(s)
Belgian Film Critics Association	2005	André Cavens Award	Dardenne brothers	Won	
Cannes Film Festival	11 – 22 May 2005	Palme d'Or	Dardenne brothers	Won	
César Awards	25 February 2006	Best Film	Dardenne brothers	Nominated	
César Awards	25 February 2006	Best Director	Dardenne brothers	Nominated	
César Awards	25 February 2006	Best Original Screenplay	Dardenne brothers	Nominated	
César Awards	25 February 2006	Most Promising Actress	Deborah Francois	Nominated	
David di Donatello Awards	2006	Best European Film	Dardenne brothers	Nominated	
European Film Awards	2006	Best Film	Dardenne brothers, Denis Freyd	Nominated	
European Film Awards	2006	Best Actor	Jérémie Renier	Nominated	
Gopo Awards	2007	Best European Film	Dardenne brothers	Nominated	
Guldbagge Awards	30 January 2006	Best Foreign Film	Dardenne brothers	Won	
Joseph Plateau Awards	7 March 2006	Best Film	Dardenne brothers	Won	
Joseph Plateau Awards	7 March 2006	Best Director	Dardenne brothers	Won	
Joseph Plateau Awards	7 March 2006	Best Actor	Jérémie Renier	Won	
Joseph Plateau Awards	7 March 2006	Best Actress	Déborah François	Won	
Lumière Awards	21 February 2006	Best French-Language Film	Dardenne brothers	Won	
Toronto Film Critics Association	19 December 2006	Best Foreign Language Film	Dardenne brothers	Won	
Toronto Film Critics Association	19 December 2006	Best Director	Dardenne brothers	Won	

== See also ==
- List of Belgian submissions for Academy Award for Best Foreign Language Film
