= Tori and Lokita =

2022 drama film

- Promotional poster
- French: Tori et Lokita
- Directed by: Luc Dardenne; Jean-Pierre Dardenne
- Written by: Luc Dardenne; Jean-Pierre Dardenne
- Produced by: Luc Dardenne; Jean-Pierre Dardenne; Delphine Tomson
- Starring: Pablo Schils; Joely Mbundu
- Cinematography: Benoît Dervaux
- Edited by: Marie-Hélène Dozo
- Production companies: Les Films du Fleuve; Savage Film
- Distributed by: Cinéart (Belgium); Diaphana Distribution (France)
- Release dates: 24 May 2022 (Cannes); 7 September 2022 (Belgium); 5 October 2022 (France)
- Running time: 88 minutes
- Countries: Belgium; France
- Language: French
- Box office: $715,666

Tori and Lokita (French: Tori et Lokita), is a 2022 drama film written, produced and directed by Jean-Pierre and Luc Dardenne. A co-production of Belgium and France, it stars newcomers Pablo Schils as Tori and Joely Mbundu as Lokita, and follows two infant African refugees in Belgium, struggling to obtain a visa.

The film had its world premiere in the main competition of the 2022 Cannes Film Festival on 24 May, where it won the festival's special 75th Anniversary Prize. It was theatrically released in Belgium by Cinéart on 7 September, and in France by Diaphana Distribution on 5 October 2022.

== Plot ==
Two African immigrants, eleven-year-old Tori and sixteen-year-old Lokita, live by their wits in a Belgian city, posing as brother and sister.

The two serve as musical performers at the restaurant of Betim, a man who uses his business to cover up a drug ring the two courier for, and sometimes pays Lokita for sexual favors. Lokita is trying to obtain a work visa with which she can support both herself and Tori, but she also has to deal with the debt contracted with the people who brought her to Belgium and think about the mother and five brothers she left behind in Cameroon.

When Lokita's application papers are rejected again, she accepts Betim's offer to work for him for several months, locked up in a hangar tending cannabis plantations. But this means she has to be separated from Tori, without even being able to call him, which becomes unbearable for both of them.

Tori hides in Betim's car to find out where Lokita is, then manages to find a way into the hangar. But on his second visit, they are both discovered by Betim. They flee, followed by Betim and his aide Luckas, who finds and kills Lokita with two gunshots to the head. Luckas cannot find Tori, who has remained hidden in the bushes.

The film ends with Lokita's funeral, where Tori performs a song that the two enjoyed.

== Cast ==
- Pablo Schils as Tori
- Joely Mbundu as Lokita
- Charlotte De Bruyne as Margot
- Tijmen Govaerts as Luckas
- Alban Ukaj as Betim
- Marc Zinga as Firmin
- Nadege Ouedraogo as Justine
- Leonardo Raco as Rino
- Baptiste Sornin as Client
- Amel Benaissa as Barbara
- Ankaye Jeannot as Client Western Union

== Production ==
Produced by Les Films du Fleuve and Savage Film, in co-production with Archipel 35/Archipel 33 and France 2 Cinéma.

== Release ==
The film had its world premiere in the main competition of the 2022 Cannes Film Festival on 24 May, where it won the festival's special 75th Anniversary Award. It was also selected as the closing film of the 46th Hong Kong International Film Festival, where it was screened on 31 August 2022.

The film was released in theaters in Belgium on 7 September 2022 by Cinéart, and in France on 5 October 2022 by Diaphana Distribution.

In June 2022, Sideshow and Janus Films acquired North American distribution rights for the film.

== Reception ==
=== Critical response ===
Tori and Lokita received generally positive reviews from critics. Rotten Tomatoes gives the film a score of 90% based on 48 reviews, with a weighted average of 7.2/10. The site's critical consensus states: "Another humanistic gem from the Dardennes, Tori and Lokita puts its characters in heartbreaking circumstances while insisting on their intrinsic dignity." Metacritic gave the film a rating of 75/100, based on 13 reviews, indicating "generally favorable reviews".

AlloCiné, a French cinema website, gave the film an average rating of 3.5/5, based on a survey of 31 French reviews.

=== Accolades ===
Award / Film Festival	Date of ceremony	Category	Recipient(s)	Result	Ref.
Cannes Film Festival	28 May 2022	Palme d'Or		Nominated	
Cannes Film Festival	28 May 2022	Special 75th Anniversary Prize		Won	
Magritte Awards	4 March 2023	Best Film		Nominated	
Magritte Awards	4 March 2023	Best Director	Jean-Pierre and Luc Dardenne	Nominated	
Magritte Awards	4 March 2023	Best Supporting Actor	Tijmen Govaerts	Nominated	
Magritte Awards	4 March 2023	Most Promising Actor	Pablo Schils	Nominated	
Magritte Awards	4 March 2023	Most Promising Actress	Joely Mbundu	Nominated	
