= Joseph Plateau Awards 2001 =

15th Joseph Plateau Awards

2003

Best Film:
Pauline & Paulette

The 15th Joseph Plateau Awards honoured the best Belgian filmmaking of 2000 and 2001.

== Winners ==
=== Best Belgian Actor ===
Dirk Roofthooft - Don't Cry Germaine (Pleure pas Germaine)

- Koen De Bouw - The Publishers (Lijmen/Het been)
- Benoît Poelvoorde - Doors of Glory (Les portes de la gloire)

=== Best Belgian Actress ===
Dora van der Groen - Pauline & Paulette

- Catherine Grosjean - Don't Cry Germaine (Pleure pas Germaine)
- Ann Petersen - Pauline & Paulette

=== Best Belgian Director ===
Lieven Debrauwer - Pauline & Paulette

- Robbe De Hert - Lijmen/Het been
- Gérard Corbiau - The King Is Dancing (Le roi danse)

=== Best Belgian Film ===
Pauline & Paulette

- Don't Cry Germaine (Pleure pas Germaine)
- The Publishers (Lijmen/Het been)

=== Best Belgian Screenplay ===
Pauline & Paulette - Jaak Boon and Lieven Debrauwer

- The Publishers (Lijmen/Het been)
- The King Is Dancing (Le roi danse)

=== Box Office Award ===
Pauline & Paulette

=== Joseph Plateau Music Award ===
Arno - Ties and Ropes (Le bal des pantins)
