= Pauline and Paulette =

2001 Belgian film by Lieven Debrauwer

Pauline & Paulette
- Directed by: Lieven Debrauwer
- Written by: Jaak Boon; Lieven Debrauwer
- Cinematography: Michel van Laer
- Edited by: Philippe Ravoet
- Music by: Frédéric Devreese
- Release date: 27 June 2001 (Belgium)
- Running time: 78 minutes
- Language: Dutch

Pauline and Paulette (original title: Pauline & Paulette) is a 2001 Belgian comedy-drama film directed and co-written by Lieven Debrauwer. The movie was the Belgian entry for the Academy Awards 2002 in the category Best Foreign Language Film but failed to receive the actual nomination.

== Cast ==
- Dora van der Groen as Pauline
- Ann Petersen as Paulette
- Rosemarie Bergmans as Cécile
- Julienne De Bruyn as Martha
- Idwig Stéphane as Albert
- Bouli Lanners as Taxi driver

== Plot ==
Pauline (van der Groen) is a 'little girl of 66 years old.' She is mentally disabled and being cared for by her sister, Martha. When Martha dies, her two younger sisters, Paulette (Petersen) and Cecile, have to make a decision on the best place for Pauline to be looked after. Neither of them is ready to take care of her. Paulette has a shop to look after, and Cecile has her Albert. But, according to Martha's will, her fortune will only be divided in three equal parts if one of the sisters looks after Pauline. If they decide to take her to an institution, Pauline will be the only heir.

== Awards and nominations ==
- Joseph Plateau Awards:
  - Best Belgian Actress (Dora van der Groen, won)
  - Best Belgian Actress (Ann Petersen, nominated)
  - Best Belgian Director (Lieven Debrauwer, won)
  - Best Belgian Film (won)
  - Best Belgian Screenplay (Jaak Boon and Lieven Debrauwer, won)
- World Soundtrack Awards:
  - WSA for Best Original Score of the Year Not Released on an Album (Frédéric Devreese, nominated)

== See also ==
- List of Belgian submissions for Academy Award for Best Foreign Language Film
