= Joseph Plateau Awards 2003 =

17th Joseph Plateau Awards

May 7, 2004

Best Film:
The Memory of a Killer

The 17th Joseph Plateau Awards, given on 7 May 2004, honored the best Belgian filmmaking of 2003.

Erik Van Looy's De Zaak Alzheimer (a.k.a. The Alzheimer Case or The Memory of a Killer) won five awards: Best Film, Actor (Decleir), Director (Van Looy), Screenplay and the Box Office Award. dEUS' singer Tom Barman's film Any Way the Wind Blows won two awards.

== Winners ==
- Best Actor:
  - Jan Decleir - De Zaak Alzheimer
- Best Actress:
  - Natali Broods - Any Way the Wind Blows
- Best Composer:
  - Tom Barman - Any Way the Wind Blows
- Best Director:
  - Erik Van Looy - De Zaak Alzheimer
- Best Film:
  - De Zaak Alzheimer
- Best Screenplay:
  - De Zaak Alzheimer - Carl Joos and Erik Van Looy
- Best Short Film:
  - Mayra
- Box office award:
  - De Zaak Alzheimer
