= Jérémie Renier =

Belgian actor

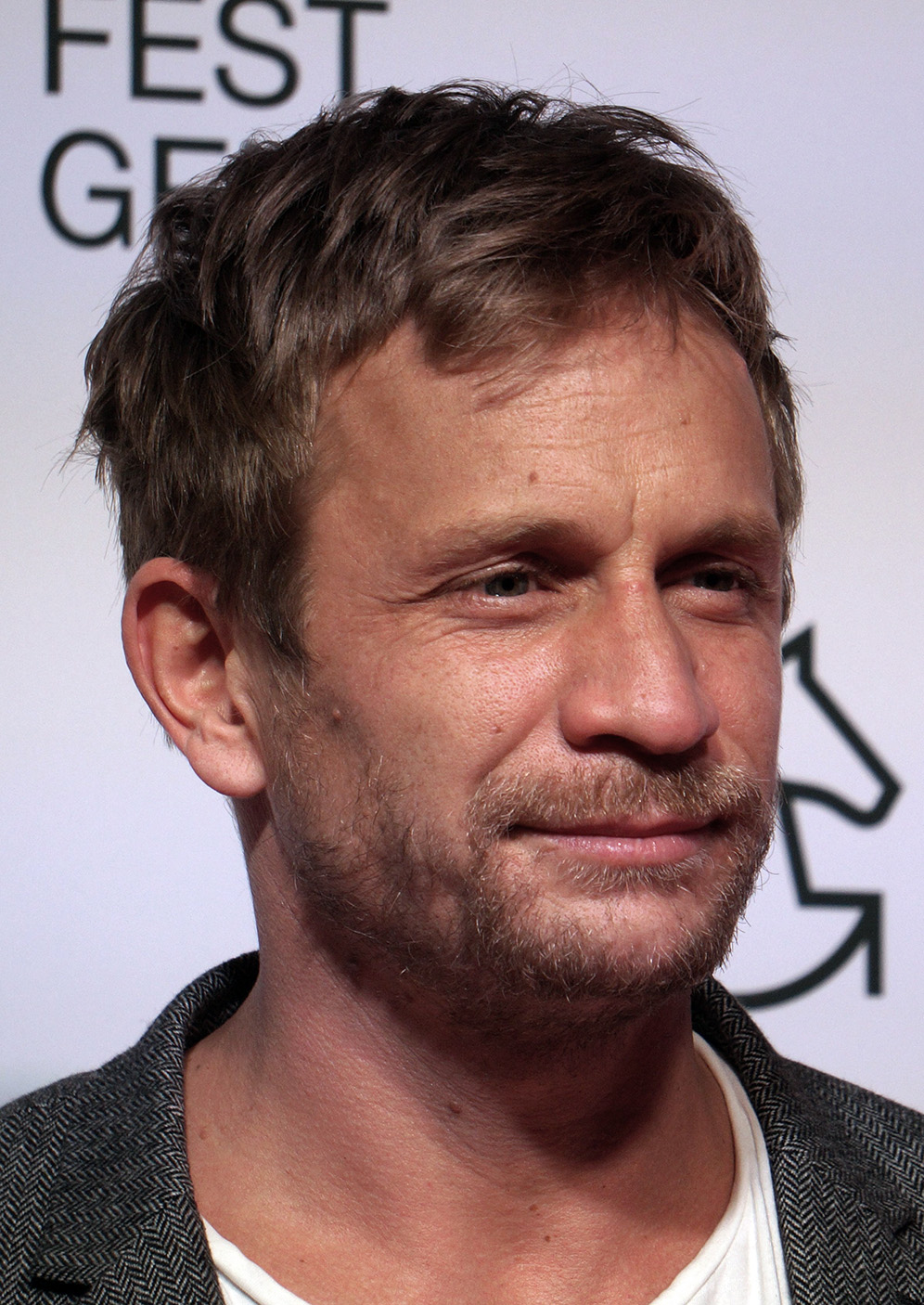
- Renier in 2020
- Born: 6 January 1981 (age 45); Brussels, Belgium
- Occupation: Actor
- Years active: 1992–present
- Known for: La Promesse; Brotherhood of the Wolf; L'Enfant

Jérémie Renier (French: [ʁenje]; born 6 January 1981) is a Belgian actor. His film debut was in 1992 at the age of 11 in a small Belgian film entitled "Les sept péchés capitaux (The Seven Deadly Sins)". He became better known to worldwide audiences in Brotherhood of the Wolf (2001) and L'Enfant (2005), for the latter he was nominated for the European Film Award for Best Actor.

For his portrayal of French singer Claude François in the 2012 film My Way, he was nominated for the César Award for Best Actor. As Yves Saint Laurent co-founder Pierre Bergé, in the 2014's biopic Saint Laurent, he was nominated for the César Award for Best Supporting Actor.

== Filmography ==
| Year | Title | Role | Notes |
|---|---|---|---|
| 1992 | The Seven Deadly Sins | Figurant | Segment "L'Honnêteté" |
| 1996 | The Promise (La Promesse) | Igor | |
| 1999 | Criminal Lovers (Les amants criminels) | Luc | |
| 2000 | Le Fétichiste | Julien Leduc | Short |
| 2000 | Faites comme si je n'étais pas là (Pretend That I'm Not Here) | Eric | |
| 2000 | The King's Daughters | François de Réans | |
| 2001 | Mère de toxico | Paul | TV movie |
| 2001 | Le Pornographe (The Pornographer) | Joseph | |
| 2001 | Brotherhood of the Wolf (Le Pacte des Loups) | Thomas d'Apcher | |
| 2002 | Jean Moulin | Didot (René Hardy) | TV movie |
| 2002 | The War in Paris | Jules | |
| 2002 | Le Troisième Œil | Michaël | |
| 2003 | Work Hard, Play Hard (Violence des échanges en milieu tempéré) | Philippe Seigner | Nominated—César Award for Most Promising Actor |
| 2003 | Un fils de notre temps | Le fils | TV movie |
| 2003 | En territoire indien | Cédric | |
| 2004 | La Petite Fadette | Landry Barbeau | TV movie |
| 2004 | À cran, deux ans après | Vincent | TV movie |
| 2004 | Le Pont des Arts | Cédric | |
| 2004 | Toi, vieux | Jérémie | Short |
| 2004 | San-Antonio | Toinet San-Antonio | |
| 2005 | L'Enfant (The Child) | Bruno | Nominated—European Film Award for Best Actor; Won—Joseph Plateau Award for Best Belgian Actor |
| 2005 | Cavalcade | Jules | |
| 2005 | Un amour à taire | Jean | TV movie |
| 2006 | Nue Propriété | Thierry | starred opposite his half-brother Yannick |
| 2006 | Président | Mathieu | |
| 2006 | Fair Play | Alexandre | |
| 2006 | Dikkenek | Greg | |
| 2007 | Atonement | Luc Cornet | |
| 2007 | Chez Maupassant | Chenal | TV series (Episode: "Miss Harriet") |
| 2008 | Lorna's Silence | Claudy Moreau | Nominated—International Cinephile Society Award for Best Supporting Actor |
| 2008 | L'Heure d'été (Summer Hours) | Jérémie | |
| 2008 | Coupable (Guilty) | Lucien | |
| 2008 | In Bruges | Eirik | |
| 2009 | The Vintner's Luck | Sobran Jodeau | |
| 2009 | Tomorrow at Dawn | Paul | |
| 2010 | Potiche | Laurent Pujol | Magritte Award for Best Supporting Actor |
| 2010 | Trois chats | Lui | Short |
| 2010 | Pièce montée | Vincent | |
| 2011 | Possessions | Bruno Caron | |
| 2011 | The Kid with a Bike | Guy Catoul | |
| 2011 | Les Aventures de Philibert, capitaine puceau | Philibert | |
| 2012 | White Elephant | Nicolás | |
| 2012 | My Way (Cloclo) | Claude François | Cabourg Film Festival Best Actor Award; Globes de Cristal Award for Best Actor; Nominated—César Award for Best Actor; Nominated—Lumière Award for Best Actor; Nominated—Magritte Award for Best Actor |
| 2013 | Brotherhood of Tears | Gabriel Chevalier | |
| 2013 | Intus | | Short |
| 2014 | Waste Land | Leo Woeste | |
| 2014 | The Great Man | Hamilton / Michaël Hernandez | |
| 2014 | Saint Laurent | Pierre Bergé | Magritte Award for Best Supporting Actor Nominated—César Award for Best Supporting Actor |
| 2015 | The Wakhan Front (Ni le ciel ni la terre) | Antares Bonnassieu | Nominated—Lumière Award for Best Actor; Nominated—Magritte Award for Best Actor |
| 2015 | Ladygrey | Mattis | |
| 2015 | Sanctuaire | Grégoire Fortin | TV movie |
| 2016 | Eternité | Henri | |
| 2016 | The Unknown Girl | Bryan's father | |
| 2017 | L'Amant Double | Paul and Louis | Nominated—Magritte Award for Best Actor |
| 2018 | L'Ordre des Médecins | Simon | |
| 2019 | Frankie | Paul | |
| 2020 | L'ennemi | Louis Durieux | |
| 2020 | Slalom | Fred | Nominated—Magritte Award for Best Actor |
| 2021 | The Man in the Basement | Simon Sandberg | |
| 2022 | Ailleurs si j'y Suis | Mathieu | |
| 2022 | L'Astronaute | Capitaine Muller | |
| 2022 | November | Marco | |
| 2025 | Carême | Charles-Maurice de Talleyrand-Périgord | |
| 2025 | Mrs. | Johann Sameck | |

== Awards and nominations ==
| Year | Award and category | Nominated work | Result | Refs |
|---|---|---|---|---|
| 2005 | César Award for Most Promising Actor | Work Hard, Play Hard | Nominated | |
| 2006 | Joseph Plateau Award | L'Enfant | Won | |
| 2006 | Prix Jean Gabin | — | Won | |
| 2012 | Magritte Award for Best Supporting Actor | Potiche | Won | |
| 2012 | Cabourg Film Festival Swann d'Or for Best Actor | My Way | Won | |
| 2013 | Globe de Cristal Award for Best Actor | My Way | Won | |
| 2013 | Lumière Award for Best Actor | My Way | Nominated | |
| 2013 | Magritte Award for Best Actor | My Way | Nominated | |
| 2013 | César Award for Best Actor | My Way | Nominated | |
| 2015 | Magritte Award for Best Supporting Actor | Saint Laurent | Won | |
| 2015 | César Award for Best Supporting Actor | Saint Laurent | Nominated | |
| 2016 | Magritte Award for Best Actor | The Wakhan Front | Nominated | |
| 2016 | Lumière Award for Best Actor | The Wakhan Front | Nominated | |
| 2018 | Magritte Award for Best Actor | L'Amant double | Nominated | |
