= Rosetta (film) =

1999 film by Luc Dardenne, Jean-Pierre Dardenne

- Theatrical release poster
- Directed by: Luc Dardenne; Jean-Pierre Dardenne
- Written by: Luc Dardenne; Jean-Pierre Dardenne
- Produced by: Luc Dardenne; Jean-Pierre Dardenne
- Starring: Émilie Dequenne; Fabrizio Rongione; Olivier Gourmet; Anne Yernaux
- Cinematography: Alain Marcoen
- Edited by: Marie-Hélène Dozo
- Music by: Thomas Gauder
- Production companies: Les Films du Fleuve; ARP; RTBF
- Distributed by: Cinéart (Belgium); ARP Sélection (France)
- Release dates: 22 May 1999 (Cannes); 22 September 1999 (Belgium); 29 September 1999 (France)
- Running time: 93 minutes
- Countries: Belgium; France
- Language: French
- Box office: $5.6 million

Rosetta is a 1999 coming-of-age drama film written and directed by Luc and Jean-Pierre Dardenne. The film follows the story of a teenager (Émilie Dequenne), residing in a caravan park with her alcoholic mother. In her quest for survival and a better life, she tirelessly seeks employment in order to break free from her tumultuous living situation, hoping to leave behind the caravan and her dysfunctional mother for a more stable and secure life.

The film won numerous accolades, including the Palme d'Or and the Best Actress awards at the 1999 Cannes Film Festival, and received critical acclaim upon release.

== Plot ==
When her probationary employment ends without her being hired, Rosetta (Émilie Dequenne) engages in a violent struggle against her manager and the policemen when she refuses to leave the premises. She returns home to "The Grand Canyon", the trailer park where she lives with her alcoholic mother, who mends worn clothes for Rosetta to sell to charity shops. They get into a physical struggle over her mother accepting gifts from men for sexual favours. Rosetta goes to a nearby river and lays out fish traps to poach trout for food. Unable to receive unemployment pay, refusing to take welfare, and desperate for work, Rosetta asks around for vacancies until she comes upon a waffle stand. She befriends the worker, Riquet (Fabrizio Rongione), and asks the owner (Olivier Gourmet) for a job, without success. Later, Rosetta treats her period cramps with pain relievers and a hairdryer, warming her abdomen.

Riquet makes an unexpected visit to the caravan park, startling Rosetta. He informs her that a colleague was fired and that she can have the job. Her mother's promiscuity resulting from alcoholism prompts Rosetta to encourage her to visit a rehabilitation clinic. However, her mother's denial of her addiction causes a physical fight between them. Her mother runs away and leaves Rosetta to nearly drown in the river by the park. She decides to stay with Riquet for the night and inquires about renting a bed in the building. During the awkward evening, Rosetta discovers a waffle iron in his possession. He tries to get Rosetta to dance, but her period cramps put an end to it. As she lies in bed, she tries to convince herself that her life has started to function normally.

At work, she is replaced after three days by the owner's son, who failed school, leading to another emotional meltdown. Rosetta is moderately pacified when the owner tells her she will be contacted if an opportunity arises. She begins a new but fruitless search for employment and keeps Riquet company during work. He offers to pay for a waffle, but she refuses his charity.

While fishing Rosetta hears a motorbike engine, thinking it is the janitor, she throws her fish traps into the pond, though it turns out to be only Riquet. He then falls into the pond while helping her find the traps. She watches him thrashing in the muddy water and hesitates before helping him out. Later, she discovers that Riquet has been selling his own waffles during business hours, due to him offering her an under-the-table job helping him mix the batter. After some contemplation, she tells the owner. Rosetta looks on as Riquet is thrown out of the stand, and she is handed his apron. Betrayed and hurt, Riquet chases her on his moped until he catches up to her and demands to know her motive. Rosetta states she wanted a job and wishes she hadn't saved him from the water. He counters that she still helped him and lets her leave.

The next day, Riquet buys a waffle from Rosetta while she is working, and she can barely look him in the eye. Returning home, she finds her mother unconscious and inebriated in front of the caravan. She drags her mother inside and puts her to bed. Rosetta calls her boss on a payphone and quits her job. Returning to the trailer, she turns on the gas and leaves it running in an attempt to asphyxiate herself and her mother. The gas runs out though, and she goes to the landlord to buy another canister. As she hauls the heavy canister of gas with great difficulty, Riquet arrives on his moped and circles around her. She eventually collapses to the ground and bursts into tears. Riquet helps her up, and she turns to gaze at him as she slowly regains her composure.

== Cast ==
- Émilie Dequenne as Rosetta
- Fabrizio Rongione as Riquet
- Anne Yernaux as the mother
- Olivier Gourmet as the boss
- Bernard Marbaix as the campground's manager
- Thomas Gollas as the mother's boyfriend

== Reception ==
=== Box office ===
The film opened on two screens in New York City on 5 November 1999 and grossed $20,187, ultimately grossing $266,665 after thirteen weeks in theatres.

=== Critical response ===
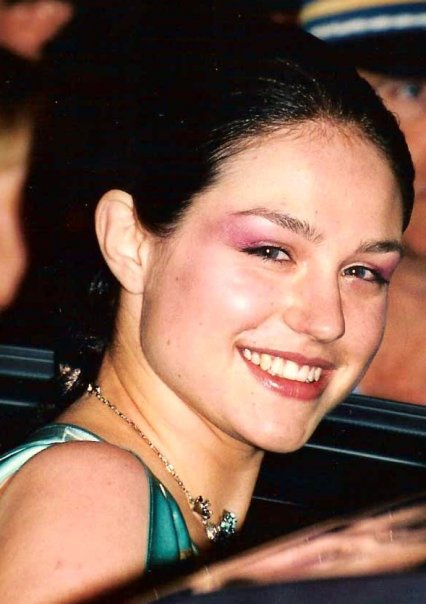
Lead actress Émilie Dequenne at the 1999 Cannes Film Festival

Rosetta was released to overwhelmingly positive reception by American mainstream press and critics, who cited the lack of a musical score and use of a handheld camera throughout its production as a major factor in its overall unique tone. On the review aggregator website Rotten Tomatoes, the film holds an approval rating of 90% based on 29 reviews, with an average rating of 7.7/10. Metacritic, which uses a weighted average, assigned the film a score of 76 out of 100, based on 19 reviews, indicating "generally favorable" reviews.

Derek Elley of Variety notes the film is "Anchored by a performance of grim determination and almost feral instincts from its lead actress, Rosetta is an extremely small European art movie from Belgian brothers Luc and Jean-Pierre Dardenne that will alienate as many viewers as it wins over." Stephen Holden of The New York Times gave a more critical review due to the prevalent gloom, stating Rosetta "is so clinically detached from its subject and its screenplay so minimal that we never really feel the title character's intense suffering or even get to know her very well. As she spirals into despair, the film's heavy, social-realist angst feels more than a little contrived... Instead of feeling universal, the movie feels claustrophobic." In his review for Boston Globe Jay Carr surmises, "The bleakness of Rosetta will not be for all, but it's one of the best films of the year."

Roger Ebert gave Rosetta three and a half stars in the Chicago Sun-Times, noting its "neorealist, without pedigree, downbeat, stylistically straightforward" nature. He further commented, "The film has an odd subterranean power. It doesn't strive for our sympathy or make any effort to portray Rosetta as colorful, winning or sympathetic. It's a film of economic determinism, the story of a young woman for whom employment equals happiness. Or so she thinks until she has employment and is no happier, perhaps because that is something she has simply never learned to be." Peter Bradshaw, writing for The Guardian, lauded Rosetta to be "a rigorous transforming gaze, a strange and passionate urgency. Every time I watch it, it becomes more moving, more commanding, more exceptional. It is a film whose grace and lyricism has earned it, simply, the status of classic: something of real greatness." Jonathan Rosenbaum, reviewing for Chicago Reader, extolled the film as showing an extraordinary capability of maintaining an objective view into the world of the protagonist and "the most visceral filmgoing experience of the past year, including all of Hollywood's explosions and special-effects extravaganzas".

The French press were also enthusiastic about the film. Jean-Pierre Dufreigne reviewing for L'Express highly recommended Rosetta to readers regardless of polarization because of its tenacious depiction of youth straining to preserve their integrity while bearing adult responsibilities and the effective use of the camera to capture the essence of the protagonist. Marine Landrot writing for Télérama gave additional praise to Rosetta, noting the role reversal between Rosetta and her mother signified the inherent desire in childhood comforts as both yield to the pressures afflicted by modern society.

=== Accolades ===
The film unanimously won the Palme d'Or and the Best Actress awards at the 1999 Cannes Film Festival. The film also received the André Cavens Award for Best Film by the Belgian Film Critics Association (UCC), and the Golden Pegasus from the 2000 Flaiano International Prizes for Best Director. Belgium's submission of Rosetta was not nominated for the 72nd Academy Awards. Émilie Dequenne won the CFCA Award for Most Promising Actress from the Chicago Film Critics Association Awards, tied with Julia Stiles of 10 Things I Hate About You and was nominated for the Most Promising Actress at the 25th César Awards.

At the 2000 Joseph Plateau Awards, it was presented with the Joseph Plateau Award for Best Belgian Actress, Best Belgian Director, Best Belgium Film, and Box Office Award while Olivier Gourmet received a nomination for Best Belgium Actor. Other nominations included the Independent Spirit Award for Best Foreign Film and the European Film Awards for Best Actress and Best Film.

== Rosetta Law ==
Contrary to popular belief, the film did not inspire a new so-called "Rosetta Law" in Belgium that prohibited employers from paying teenage workers less than the minimum wage and included other youth labour reforms. In a 2006 Guardian interview with the Dardenne brothers, Jean-Pierre explained the misconception; "No, that law already existed, it just hadn't been voted through yet. The truth is always less interesting than the fiction."

== See also ==
- List of submissions to the 72nd Academy Awards for Best Foreign Language Film
- List of Belgian submissions for Academy Award for Best Foreign Language Film
