= Mayra =

Mayra or Mäyrä is a given name. Notable people with the name include:

- Mayra Andrade (born 1985), Cape Verdean singer who lives and records in Paris, France
- Mayra Conde (born 1969), Guatemalan personal trainer and mixed martial artist
- Mayra Dias, Brazilian model
- Mayra Flores (born 1986), American politician
- Mayra Gómez Kemp (born 1948), movie star
- Mayra García (born 1972), Mexican beach volleyball player
- Mayra Gil (born 2003), Mexican basketball player
- Mayra González (born 1968), Cuban rower
- Mayra Hermosillo (born 1987), Mexican actress and filmmaker
- Mayra Huerta, (born 1970), Mexican beach volleyball player
- Mayra Leiva (born 1996), Argentine basketball player
- Mayra Matos (born 1988), Puerto Rican beauty pageant contestant
- Mayra Mendoza (born 1983), Argentine politician who served as National Deputy from 2011 to 2019
- Mayra Montero (born 1952), Cuban-Puerto Rican writer
- Mayra Ramírez (born 1999), Colombian footballer
- Mayra Rosales (born 1980), was one of the heaviest living people in the world
- Mayra Santos-Febres (born 1966), Puerto Rican professor of literature, poet, novelist, and critic
- Mayra Verónica (born 1977), Cuban-American model
- Mayra Vila (born 1960), Cuban javelin thrower
