= Alain Marcoen =

Belgian cinematographer

- Born: 1950 (age 74–75); Brussels, Belgium

Alain Marcoen, is a Belgian cinematographer. He is known for his work on L'enfant (2005), L'âge de raison, le cinéma des frères Dardenne (2013) and Two Days, One Night (2014). Marcoen has frequently worked on films by the Dardenne brothers.
