= The Unknown Girl =

2016 film by Jean-Pierre Dardenne and Luc Dardenne

- Theatrical release poster
- French: La Fille inconnue
- Directed by: Jean-Pierre Dardenne; Luc Dardenne
- Written by: Jean-Pierre Dardenne; Luc Dardenne
- Produced by: Jean-Pierre Dardenne; Luc Dardenne; Denis Freyd
- Starring: Adèle Haenel; Olivier Bonnaud; Jérémie Renier; Louka Minnella
- Cinematography: Alain Marcoen
- Edited by: Marie-Hélène Dozo
- Production companies: Les Films du Fleuve; Archipel 35; Savage Film; France 2 Cinéma; VOO; BeTV; RTBF
- Distributed by: Cinéart (Belgium); Diaphana (France)
- Release dates: 18 May 2016 (Cannes); 5 October 2016 (Belgium); 12 October 2016 (France)
- Running time: 106 minutes
- Countries: Belgium; France
- Language: French
- Budget: $7 million
- Box office: $2.4 million

The Unknown Girl (French: La Fille inconnue) is a 2016 mystery drama film directed by the Dardenne brothers, and starring Adèle Haenel, Jérémie Renier, and Louka Minnella.

The Unknown Girl was selected to compete for the Palme d'Or at the 2016 Cannes Film Festival. The film was released in Belgium on 5 October 2016 by Cinéart and in France on 12 October 2016 by Diaphana.

== Plot ==
Dr. Davin, a young white Belgian attending physician, is filling in for imminent retiree Dr. Habran at a free clinic in Seraing before Davin begins working at a large practice. She is assisted by Julien, a taciturn intern. One busy Thursday, Davin and Julien are attending to a patient when the clinic's buzzer is rung by a mother whose son is suffering from a seizure. They rush to the patient and he survives, but Julien contributes little to the situation. That evening, the buzzer rings a single time after hours and Davin does not answer it, dismissing it as an annoyance and telling Julien that as doctors, they must not allow patients to cause them excessive fatigue and hinder their diagnostic judgment. However, Julien exits the room. It is unclear if he answers the door, though he soon leaves the clinic without saying a word to Davin.

The next morning, Davin is stopped outside of the clinic by policemen who tell her that a woman has been found dead on a construction site on the bank of the river near the clinic and request to see the clinic’s surveillance camera footage. Davin obliges and tries to go about the day as usual, but Julien neither arrives for work nor answers her call. In the afternoon, Davin is called to the police station and confesses to having heard the buzzer. She learns that the woman died from an open skull fracture and from watching the footage, sees that she is a young African and takes a picture of her. The police found no identifying documents on her but suspect that she stopped by the clinic because she was a patient, yet Davin does not recognize her. Davin visits the construction site where the woman died but workers there tell her that the block of concrete she fractured her head on has been removed. At night, she goes to Julien’s and shows him the photo; he does not recognize her. He also tells Davin that he plans to quit medicine and return to his home village but offers no explanation and is unwilling to be convinced otherwise.

Davin stops by the hospitalized Habran, who looks at the picture but does not recognize the woman, though he offers to share the names of the dozens of African families he cares for with the police. During their interaction, Davin suddenly reveals her decision to give up the job at the practice and take over Habran’s clinic. On a house call, Davin shows the picture of the woman to Bryan, a young male patient. When he claims to have never seen her, Davin perceives a sudden and significant elevation in Bryan’s heart rate. Leaving the house, she calls a detective, learns that the woman was buried that afternoon, and requests the name of the cemetery. Davin then returns to Bryan’s house and presses him regarding the woman, but he continues to deny knowledge, so she tells him that he can stop by the clinic if he wishes to talk.

Davin moves into the clinic and buys a plot in the cemetery for the woman. Bryan arrives at the clinic with indigestion and ultimately divulges that he and a friend saw the woman performing fellatio on an old man in a truck that Thursday evening. Davin meets the truck owner, who denies any knowledge of the incident and angrily tells her to leave. At an assisted living facility, Davin finds the owner’s father, who reveals that the woman was a prostitute brought to him by her son but claims to not know her name. The owner soon walks in on the two, forcing Davin to leave. She notices a few Africans inside of an Internet café and walks in. She first calls Julien, leaving a voicemail where she asks for permission to visit him at his village. Then, she asks an employee and two other patrons there if they recognize the woman, but none of them do. Later, Bryan’s father arrives at the clinic to tell Davin that Bryan had made up the friend to seem less guilty, so she should not bother anyone else.

Davin visits Julien, who explains that seeing the seizure patient prompted him to quit medicine because the sight reminded him of the abuse he suffered at the hand of his father and the neglect he experienced from his physician, which made him realize that he had worked to become a doctor to treat himself, not others. Returning to Seraing, Davin is cornered by the Internet café patrons, who warn her to stay in her lane regarding the dead woman. After the patrons leave, Davin sees Bryan and a friend riding on a motorcycle and follows them to another construction site, where she hopes to speak with the friend. Before she can do so, Bryan pushes her into a hole before giving her a ladder - enough time for the friend to escape.

Back home, Davin receives a call from Julien, who shares that he has decided to resume pursuing medicine. At night, Bryan’s parents visit Davin, accusing her of harassing Bryan about the dead woman and causing his indigestion to flare up again. Consequently, they decide to no longer procure Davin’s services and warn her against further contact with Bryan. However, mere hours later, Bryan’s father calls Davin for his back pain. After Davin administers morphine, she asks Bryan’s father if he knew about the dead woman, a question that annoys him.

Davin is called to the police station because showing the dead woman’s photo around is interfering with the police’s other activities. They also claim to have identified the dead woman as one Serena Ndong from Gabon but need some time to verify her passport. Returning home, she is stopped by Bryan’s father, who confesses that on that Thursday, he was driving when he saw Serena walking and flagged her for her services. However, Serena refused and started running, so Bryan’s father pursued her in his car. Unbeknownst to him, Bryan had witnessed this. Serena initially lost Bryan’s father, which is how she was able to press on the clinic’s buzzer, but when the door was not opened, she ran to catch a bus, which she missed, allowing Bryan’s father to catch up with her. They made a deal but Bryan’s father wanted to go further, which Serena refused, causing him to pursue her on foot, leading to her tripping over something on the construction site and falling. Bryan’s father believes she merely fainted and left. When Davin tells Bryan’s father that the woman died because of excessive blood loss from the fall, implying that he could have saved her, Bryan’s father becomes outraged and refuses to accept Davin’s advice of calling the police for fear of the repercussions. While he uses Davin’s bathroom, Davin hears a loud noise, prompting her to barge in and discover that Bryan’s father just failed in an attempt to strangle himself. After further convincing, Bryan’s father uses Davin’s phone to call the police.

Some time later, Davin is working as usual when the Internet café employee walks in. She confides in Davin that she once worked alongside the dead woman, whose name was Félicie Khoumba; her pimp gave her a fake passport because she was a minor. The employee’s pimp was attracted to Félicie, causing the employee to become jealous of her. Thus, when Félicie disappeared, she was initially happy. However, when Davin showed her the photo, she felt ashamed and feared that her pimp would force her to return to prostitution, prompting her to visit Davin. As she leaves, she tells Davin that she will act in place of Félicie’s family to arrange her burial and accepts a hug from her. Davin then turns her attention to the next patient of the day.

== Cast ==
- Adèle Haenel as Jenny Davin, a young physician
- Olivier Bonnaud as Julien, a medical school student
- Jérémie Renier as Bryan's father
- Louka Minnella as Bryan
- Christelle Cornil as Bryan's mother
- Nadège Ouedraogo as cashier at the cybercafé
- Olivier Gourmet as Lambert's son
- Pierre Sumkay as Monsieur Lambert
- Yves Larec as Doctor Habran, retired owner of the clinic
- Ben Hamidou as Inspector Ben Mahmoud
- Laurent Caron as Inspector Bercaro
- Fabrizio Rongione as Doctor Riga
- Myriem Akheddiou as Doctor Riga's assistant
- Jean-Michel Balthazar as diabetic patient
- Thomas Doret as Lucas
- Marc Zinga as pimp

== Production ==
In April 2015, Adèle Haenel joined the cast of the film, with the Dardenne brothers, Luc and Jean-Pierre, directing from a screenplay they wrote. The Unknown Girl is produced through the directors' Belgian company Les Films du Fleuve in collaboration with the French company Archipel 35. Filming began in October 2015 and ended on 22 December.

The film was shot in chronological order.

== Release ==
The film had its world premiere at the 2016 Cannes Film Festival on 18 May 2016. Sundance Selects had previously acquired U.S distribution rights to the film. Mixed critical response to the film led to the Dardenne brothers making extensive cuts after Cannes, shortening the film by seven minutes than the original cut premiered at the festival. Luc Dardenne stated that "There are several critics who are also friends who liked it a lot but thought there were certain places in the film that didn’t work very well. I believe it was that which prompted our concern. We were ready to make changes." The new cut was officially shown in June at the Institut Lumière in Lyon, France. The film was screened at the Toronto International Film Festival, and the New York Film Festival on 12 October 2016. The film was released in Belgium on 5 October 2016 and in France on 12 October 2016.

In the United Kingdom, the BBC Four broadcast was on 30 March 2019.

== Reception ==
On review aggregator Rotten Tomatoes, the film holds a 70% approval rating based on 80 reviews, with an average score of 6.2/10. The website's critical consensus reads, "The Unknown Girl isn't quite up to the standards of the Dardenne brothers' best work, but remains a well-acted effort that pays poignant – albeit limited – dividends." At Metacritic, the film received a score of 65 out of 100 based on 21 reviews from mainstream critics, indicating "generally favorable reviews".
