= Marie-Hélène Dozo =

Belgian film editor

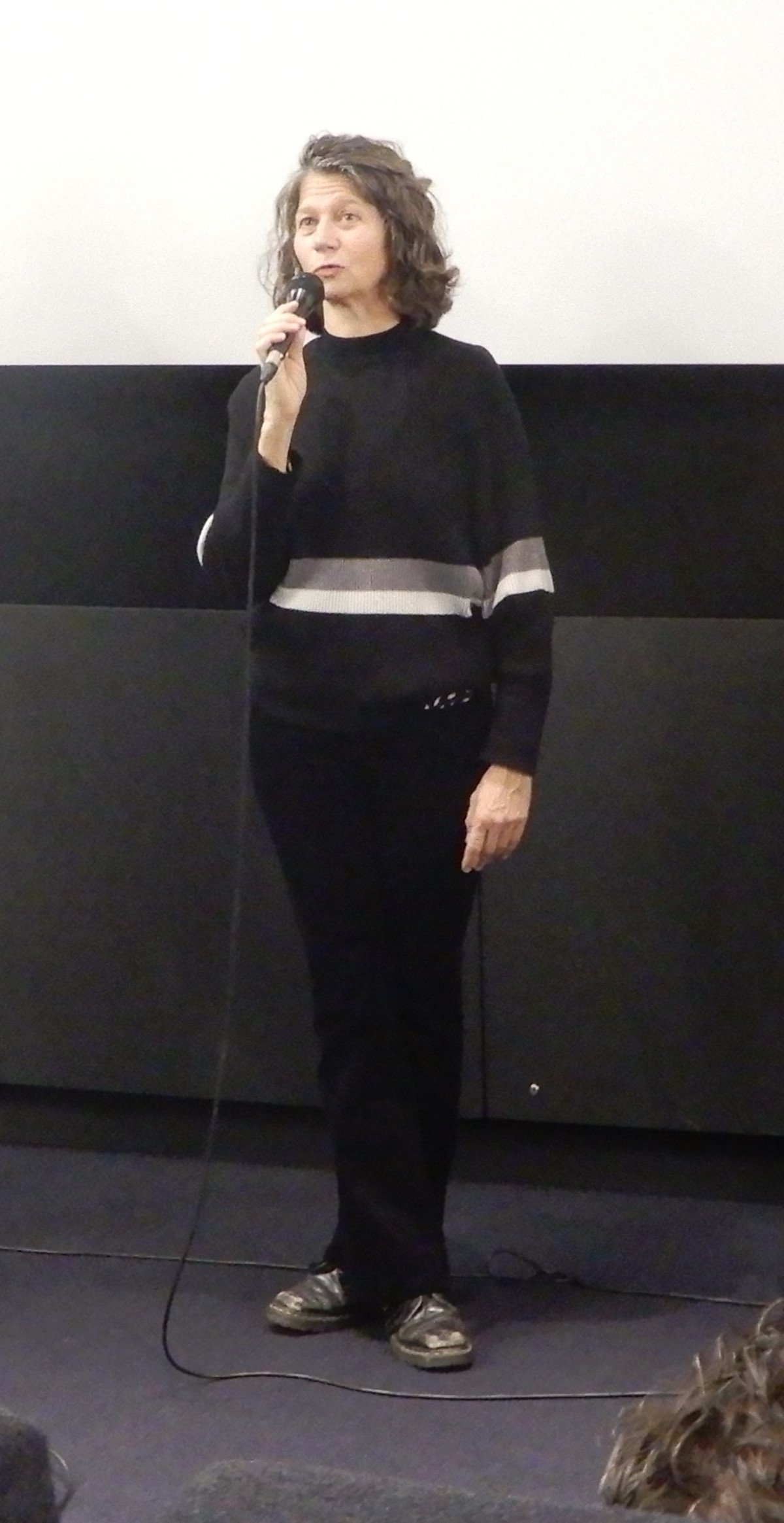
- Occupation: Film editor
- Years active: 1989–present

Marie-Hélène Dozo is a film editor with more than forty film credits. Her editing credits include La Promesse (1996), Rosetta (1999), Murderous Maids (2000), The Son (2002), My Queen Karo (2009), A Screaming Man (2010) and The Ditch (2010). Dozo received the Magritte Award for Best Editing for her work in the 2012 film Kinshasa Kids.

== Filmography ==
Year	Title	Notes
1989	La Mina	
1992	Les Sept Péchés capitaux	
1992	Camion	
1996	La Promesse	
1997	Gigi, Monica... et Bianca	Documentary
1999	Rosetta	
2000	Murderous Maids	
2000	Low Tide	
2000	La Devinière	
2001	In This Tricky Life	
2002	A Piece of Sky	
2002	The Son	
2002	First Love	Short film
2003	Feathers in My Head	
2004	The Suspects	
2005	The Girl from the Chartreuse	
2005	L'Enfant	
2005	Clejani	Documentary
2005	Aguaviva: El abrazo de la tierra	Documentary
2006	Dry Season	
2007	To Each His Own Cinema	Segment: Dans l'Obscurité
2008	Lorna's Silence	
2008	De wieg van het pissend Ketje	Documentary
2008	Sex, Okra and Salted Butter	Telefilm
2009	My Queen Karo	
2009	Zindeeq	
2010	A Screaming Man	Muhr AsiaAfrica Award for Best Editor - Feature Film
2010	The Ditch	
2011	The Kid with a Bike	Nominated—Magritte Award for Best Editing
2011	The Passage	
2012	Low Tide	
2012	Kinshasa Kids	Magritte Award for Best Editing
2012	Shadow of the Stone	Short film
2013	Diego Star	
2013	Stop the Pounding Heart	Documentary
2013	GriGris	
2013	Gimme Shelter	
2014	L'Éclat furtif de l'ombre	
2014	Iranien	Documentary
2014	Two Days, One Night	Nominated—Magritte Award for Best Editing
2015	The Diary of a Teenage Girl	
2015	The Other Side	Documentary
2015	L'Ennemi invisible	Documentary
2016	The Unknown Girl	
2017	Boundaries	
2019	Young Ahmed	Nominated—Magritte Award for Best Editing
2021	The Restless	Nominated—Magritte Award for Best Editing
2025	Six Days in Spring	
