= Lorna's Silence =

- Theatrical poster
- Directed by: Jean-Pierre Dardenne; Luc Dardenne
- Written by: Jean-Pierre Dardenne; Luc Dardenne
- Produced by: Jean-Pierre Dardenne; Luc Dardenne; Denis Freyd
- Starring: Arta Dobroshi; Jérémie Renier; Fabrizio Rongione
- Cinematography: Alain Marcoen
- Edited by: Marie-Hélène Dozo
- Production company: Les Films du Fleuve
- Distributed by: Cinéart (Belgium); Lucky Red (Italy)
- Release dates: 19 May 2008 (Cannes); 27 August 2008 (Belgium)
- Running time: 105 minutes
- Countries: Belgium; Italy; Germany
- Languages: French; Italian; German
- Budget: €4 million
- Box office: $5.1 million

Lorna's Silence (French: Le Silence de Lorna) is a 2008 drama film by the Belgian brothers Jean-Pierre and Luc Dardenne. It was the winner of the 2008 LUX Prize, as well as the Best Screenplay Award at the 2008 Cannes Film Festival.

== Plot ==
Lorna, a young Albanian woman living in Belgium, is in a sham marriage with a drug addict named Claudy. She dreams of owning a snack bar with her boyfriend, Sokol, and agrees to have another fake marriage with a Russian man to earn the money for it. Fabio, a petty criminal who orchestrated the whole plan, pressures Lorna to kill Claudy via an overdose. Moved by Claudy's determination to stay clean, Lorna pleads with Fabio to hold off with the plan.

In order to obtain a quick divorce, Lorna decides to hurt herself and make it look like Claudy abused her. After a second attempt where she enlists a nurse at a drug rehabilitation clinic to act as the witness, she receives approval for the divorce, while Claudy gets out of the hospital. She asks Fabio to wait a month before she has to marry the Russian. At home, she kicks out a drug dealer who almost tempted Claudy into a relapse, has sex with Claudy and reconciles with him. The next day, Lorna and Claudy agree that she will help him stay clean.

After a time skip, Lorna is seen collecting Claudy's possessions in his apartment and from a morgue worker, revealing that Claudy was killed, though Fabio made it look like an overdose, supposedly thanks to "Lorna's silence". Fabio claims the murder was necessary as the Russian man was growing impatient and offers Lorna an extra thousand euro for putting up with Claudy. While Fabio and his accomplice Spirou leave, Lorna is interrogated by two detectives.

Afterward, Lorna makes plans to open up the bar with Sokol and has a meeting with the Russian man, taking more money from Fabio, including the thousand she refused prior. Feeling ill, she suspects that she is pregnant and visits the hospital to get an abortion but backs out. Fabio pressures her to go through with it but she refuses, trying to open a bank account for her unborn child, giving Claudy's last name when asked for information. During a second meeting with the Russian, she reveals her pregnancy and he tells her the baby is out of the question. Fabio later accosts Lorna and tells her he will take her to get an abortion, after which Lorna clutches her stomach in pain. Later, at the hospital, the doctor insists that Lorna is not pregnant but asks her to stay in the hospital overnight.

Fabio realizes that he can no longer use Lorna, meets up with her and Sokol and takes back most of the money he had given her. The next day, Lorna packs up her possessions and Fabio takes away her SIM card, sending her off with Spirou. In the car, Lorna asks Spirou why he has not taken the highway, as he claims that he needs a gas station, yet passes one on the way. Realizing that Spirou intends to kill her, she asks him to stop the car so she can pee. Lorna grabs a rock while she's urinating and hits Spirou in the head with it, running off into the woods. The movie ends as Lorna arrives at a cabin in the woods where she decides to spend the night. She goes out to find firewood and talks to her imaginary baby, telling it that she will not let it die the way she did with Claudy.

== Cast ==
- Arta Dobroshi - Lorna
- Jérémie Renier - Claudy Moreau
- Fabrizio Rongione - Fabio
- Alban Ukaj - Sokol
- Morgan Marinne - Spirou

== Critical response ==
Lorna's Silence received mostly positive reviews from critics. Review aggregation website Rotten Tomatoes gives it an 85% approval rating, based on 96 reviews, with an average score of 7.2/10. The site's consensus reads, "Subtle and emotionally bleak, this gripping thriller features the Dardenne brothers' recognizable penchant for realism and very strong performances. At Metacritic, which assigns a normalized rating out of 100 to reviews from mainstream critics, the film received an average score of 80, based on 24 reviews, indicating "generally favorable reviews".

== Accolades ==
- Cannes Film Festival (France)
  - Won: Best Screenplay (Jean-Pierre and Luc Dardenne)
  - Nominated: Golden Palm (Jean-Pierre and Luc Dardenne)
- César Awards (France)
  - Nominated: Best Foreign Film
- European Film Awards
  - Nominated: Best Actress (Arta Dobroshi)
- Lumiere Awards (France)
  - Won: Best French Language Film
- LUX Prize
  - Won: 2008 LUX Prize
