= Dardenne brothers =

Belgian film directors, screenwriters and film producers

Jean-Pierre and Luc Dardenne CMW
- Jean-Pierre (right) and Luc Dardenne in 2026
- Born: Jean-Pierre: 21 April 1951 (age 75); Liège, Belgium Luc: 10 March 1954 (age 72); Liège, Belgium
- Occupations: Filmmakers and producers
- Years active: 1978–present
- Awards: Full list

Brothers Jean-Pierre Dardenne CMW (French: [daʁdɛn]; born 21 April 1951) and Luc Dardenne CMW (born 10 March 1954), collectively referred to as the Dardenne brothers, are Belgian filmmaking brothers, who write, produce, and direct their films together. Their work tends to reflect left-wing themes and points-of-view in contemporary Belgium. They also own the Belgian production company Les Films du Fleuve.

The Dardennes began making narrative and documentary films in the late 1970s. They came to international attention with La Promesse (1996) and Rosetta (1999), which won their first Palme d'Or at the 52nd Cannes Film Festival. For L'Enfant (2005), the duo won the Palme for a second time, putting them in a small club, at the time, of only seven filmmakers to ever do so.

Their eighth film, The Kid with a Bike (2011), won the Grand Prix (second place) at the 64th Cannes Film Festival, and was nominated for the Golden Globe Award for Best Foreign Language Film. While Young Ahmed (2019) won Best Director at the 72nd Cannes Film Festival.

The duo is also known for launching the career of several Belgian actors, who later established themself in the Francophone cinema industry, such as Jérémie Renier, Olivier Gourmet, Émilie Dequenne, Fabrizio Rongione, Déborah François, and Myriem Akheddiou.

== Early life and career ==
The Dardennes were born and raised in Seraing in Liege, in Wallonia, the French-speaking region of Belgium. Jean-Pierre (born in 1951) studied drama while Luc (born three years later) studied philosophy.

In 1975 they established Derives, the production company that produced the roughly sixty documentary films they made before branching into feature films. These films covered such topics as Polish immigration, World War II resistance, a general strike in 1960. Their first two feature films, however, are still not widely distributed today: Falsch (1987) adapted from René Kalisky, featuring Bruno Cremer and Je pense a vous (1992).

In 1994, they launched the production company Les Films du Fleuve, which produces all of their films and also films by other European directors such as Ken Loach, Jacques Audiard and Cristian Mungiu.

== Career ==
=== 1990s ===
Their first international success was La Promesse (1996), the film premiered in the Directors' Fortnight section of the 49th Cannes Film Festival. It stars their recurrent collaborators Jérémie Renier (by then still a teenager) and Olivier Gourmet as a son/father duo who traffic undocumented immigrants in Seraing. The film received critical acclaim and was nominated for the César Award for Best Foreign Film.

Rosetta (1999), marked their first film selected to the main competition of the Cannes Film Festival, where it won the Palme d'Or at the 52nd edition. Starring newcomer Émilie Dequenne in the titular role, the Dardennes turned their focus to the burdens – philosophical, spiritual, psychological – of unemployment in contemporary Belgium. Dequenne, who had not acted in a film before, was awarded the Best Actress prize, it also starred newcomer Fabrizio Rongione and Olivier Gourmet. It received critical acclaim, and was selected as the Belgian entry for the Best International Feature Film at the 72nd Academy Awards, but it was not nominated.

=== 2010s ===
The Son (2002) premiered in the main competition of the 55th Cannes Film Festival, where Olivier Gourmet received the Best Actor prize. It follows a solitary carpenter consumed by a desire for revenge for his son death. The film received critical acclaim and was selected as the Belgian entry for the Best International Feature Film at the 75th Academy Awards, but it was not nominated.

L'Enfant (2005) premiered in the main competition of the 58th Cannes Film Festival, where the Dardennes won the Palme d'Or for a second time, becoming the only Belgian filmmakers to do so. Starring Jérémie Renier and Déborah François, it follows two empovirished young first time parents struggling to raise their newborn baby. The film received critical acclaim and was nominated for four César Awards, including Best Film and Best Director (their only nomination in the category). It was also selected as the Belgian entry for the Best International Feature Film at the 78th Academy Awards, but it was not nominated.

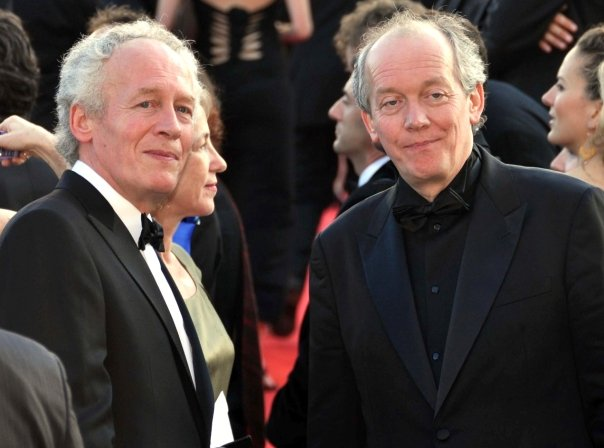
The Dardenne Brothers at the 2009 Cannes Film Festival.

Lorna's Silence (2008) premiered in the main competition of the 61st Cannes Film Festival, where it won the Best Screenplay prize. Starring Arta Dobroshi in the titular role, it was the Dardennes' first film to fully adress the imigration crisis in contemporary Europe, following the Albanian refugee community in Belgium. It also starred Jérémie Renier and Fabrizio Rongione, in supporting roles. The film received positive reviews, and won the Lux Prize, alongside a nomination for the César Award for Best Foreign Film.

=== 2010s ===
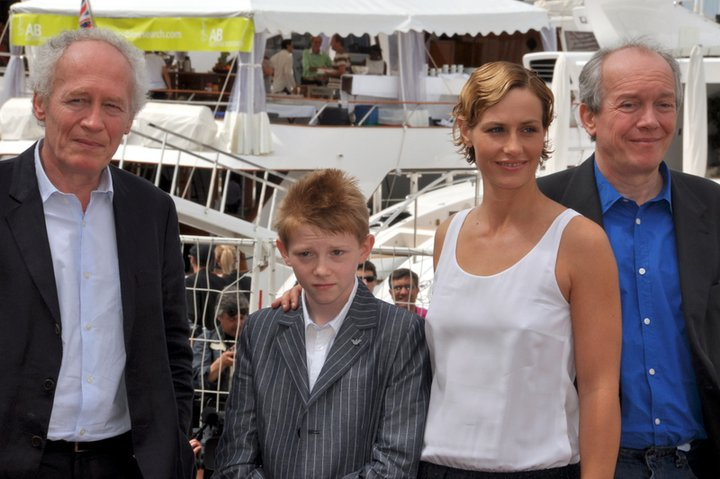
Jean-Pierre Dardenne, Thomas Doret, Cécile de France, and Luc Dardenne at the 2011 Cannes Film Festival.

The Kid with a Bike (2011) premiered in the main competition of the 64th Cannes Film Festival, where it won the Grand Prix (second place). Starring 12-year-old newcomer Thomas Doret, Cécile de France, and Jérémie Renier, it follows a teenager boy struggling to accept his father abandonment. The film is usually noted for its lighter and positive approach compared to the filmmakers other films, it received critical acclaim and was nominated for the Golden Globe Award for Best Foreign Language Film.

In June 2012, the brothers were invited to join the Academy of Motion Picture Arts and Sciences. In the same year Jean-Pierre was the jury president for the Cinéfondation and Short Films sections of the 65th Cannes Film Festival.

Two Days, One Night (2014) premiered in the main competition of the 67th Cannes Film Festival, where it was nominated for the Palme d'Or, it was their first film since La Promesse to not win any official prizes at the festival. Starring Marion Cotillard and Fabrizio Rongione, it follows Sandra, a young wife and mother in Seraing, who after a medical leave of absence for depression is fired from her job in a small solar panel factory.

Two Days, One Night received critical acclaim, and for her performance Cotillard was nominated for the Academy Award for Best Actress and the César Award for Best Actress. It was also selected as the Belgian entry for the Best International Feature Film at the 87th Academy Awards, but was controversially not nominated in the category. At the 5th Magritte Awards, it won three awards, including Best Film and Best Director.

Also in 2014, their body of work was awarded the special prize of the 40th Anniversary of the Ecumenical Jury at the Cannes Film Festival.

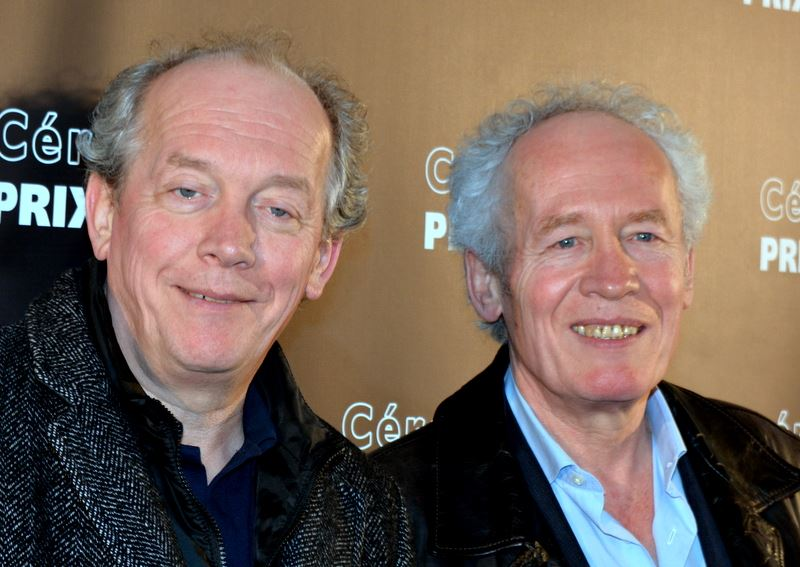
Dardenne brothers at the 2015 Lumières Awards.

The Unknown Girl (2016) premiered in the main competition of the 69th Cannes Film Festival, where it was nominated for the Palme d'Or. Starring Adèle Haenel as Jenny Davin, it follows a young white Belgian doctor who lets the door buzzer of her small clinic go unanswered one evening after work hours and then grows determined to discover the identity of the young African refugee woman found dead nearby when the police see from a security tape that she had been the person ringing at the door. It marked the return of the Dardenne brothers to the immigration subject, almost eight years after Lorna's Silence, but the film received mixed reviews at the Cannes premiere, which led to the Dardennes to engage in extensive cuts, shortening the film by seven minutes from the original cut presented at the festival. The new cut was officially shown in June 2016 at the Institut Lumière in Lyon, France.

Young Ahmed (2019) premiered in the main competition of the 72nd Cannes Film Festival, where it won the Best Director prize. Starring newcomer Idir Ben Addi in the titular role, it follows a teenager Belgian boy attempted to embrace Islamic extremism. The film received positive reviews. It was nominated for the César Award for Best Foreign Film and Addi won the Magritte Award for Most Promising Actor.

=== 2020s ===
Tori and Lokita (2022) premiered in the main competition of the 75th Cannes Film Festival, where it won the special 75th Anniversary Prize. Starring Pablo Schils and Joely Mbundu in the titular roles, it follows two infant African refugees in Belgium struggling to obtain a visa. The film received critical acclaim, and was nominated for five Magritte Awards, including Magritte Award for Best Film.

Young Mothers (2025) premiered in the main competition of the 78th Cannes Film Festival, where it won the Best Screenplay prize and the Prize of the Ecumenical Jury. Starring Lucie Laruelle, Babette Verbeek, Elsa Houben, Janaïna Halloy Fokan and Samia Hilmi, it follows five poor teenager mothers in a maternity shelter in Banneux. The film received critical acclaim, and was selected as the Belgian entry for the Best International Feature Film at the 98th Academy Awards, but it was not nominated.

== Style ==
Noted for the use of a naturalistic and social realist aproach of the working class life in Belgium, the Dardennes' films usually feature the experiences of young people at the fringes of society – immigrants, the unemployed, the inhabitants of shelters. Often employing handheld cameras and use available light.

The Dardenne brothers have a regular stable of collaborators (for all of their films the brothers share writing and directing credits), including cinematographer Alain Marcoen and editor Marie-Hélène Dozo. Jérémie Renier played Igor in La Promesse, Bruno in L'Enfant, Claudy in Le Silence de Lorna (Lorna's Silence), Guy in Le gamin au vélo (The Kid with a Bike), and Bryan's father in The Unknown Girl (La Fille inconnue). Olivier Gourmet, the main character of Le fils, has brief cameos as a detective in L'Enfant and as a bullying character in "La Fille Inconnue". Like Rosetta's Emilie Dequenne, Déborah François, the seventeen-year-old lead in L'Enfant, was appearing in her first film. Luc Dardenne has described their process of working with actors as follows: "What we do with the actors is also very physical. The day filming begins we do not feel obliged to do things exactly the way they were rehearsed; we pretend that we are starting over from zero so that we can rediscover things that we did before. The instructions we give the actors are above all physical. We start working without the cameraman—just the actors and my brother and me. We walk them through the blocking, first one then the other, trying several different versions. They say but do not act their lines. We do not tell them what the tone of their lines should be; we just say that we will see once the camera is rolling. At this point there is no cameraman, no sound engineer, no lighting. Then we set up all the camera movements exactly and the rhythm of the shot, which is usually a long take. Doing it this way allows us the ability to modify the actors' movements or any small details."

== Personal life ==
=== Controversies ===
In 2009, they signed a petition in support of director Roman Polanski, who had been detained while traveling to a film festival in relation to his 1977 sexual abuse charges, which the petition argued would undermine the tradition of film festivals as a place for works to be shown "freely and safely", and that arresting filmmakers traveling to neutral countries could open the door "for actions of which no-one can know the effects."

== Filmography ==
=== Feature film ===
Year	English title	Original title	Directors	Screenwriters	Producers	Notes
1987	Falsch		Yes	Yes	No	
1992	Je pense à vous		Yes	Yes	Yes	
1996	La Promesse		Yes	Yes	No	
1999	Rosetta		Yes	Yes	Yes	Palme d'Or at the 1999 Cannes Film Festival
2002	The Son	Le Fils	Yes	Yes	Yes	
2005	L'Enfant		Yes	Yes	Yes	Palme d'Or at the 2005 Cannes Film Festival
2008	Lorna's Silence	Le Silence de Lorna	Yes	Yes	Yes	Best Screenplay at the 2008 Cannes Film Festival
2011	The Kid with a Bike	Le gamin au vélo	Yes	Yes	Yes	Grand Prix at the 2011 Cannes Film Festival
2014	Two Days, One Night	Deux jours, une nuit	Yes	Yes	Yes	
2016	The Unknown Girl	La Fille inconnue	Yes	Yes	Yes	
2019	Young Ahmed	Le Jeune Ahmed	Yes	Yes	Yes	Best Director at the 2019 Cannes Film Festival
2022	Tori and Lokita	Tori et Lokita	Yes	Yes	Yes	75th Anniversary Special Award at the 2022 Cannes Film Festival
2025	Young Mothers	Jeunes mères	Yes	Yes	Yes	Best Screenplay at the 2025 Cannes Film Festival

=== Only producers ===
Year	Title	Notes
1995	Faute de soleil	Co-producers
2001	The Milk of Human Kindness	Co-producers
2003	The Living World	Co-producers
2003	Stormy Weather	
2003	The Assassinated Sun	
2005	The Axe	
2006	The Colonel	
2007	Vous êtes de la police?	
2009	The Front Line	
2010	K.O.R.	
2011	The Minister	
2012	Rust and Bone	Co-producers
2012	Beyond the Hills	Co-producers
2013	Marina	Co-producers
2013	Je fais le mort	Co-producers
2014	Wild Life	Co-producers
2015	Diary of a Chambermaid	Co-producers
2015	Cowboys	Co-producers
2015	Long Live the Bride	Co-producers
2016	Le Fils de Joseph	Co-producers
2016	Hedi	Co-producers
2016	Graduation	Co-producers
2016	Pericle	Co-producers
2016	Les Carnivores	Co-producers
2023	Jeanne du Barry	Co-producers
2023	The Old Oak	Co-producers
2026	Diane in the Loop	

=== Documentaries ===
Year	Title	Credited as			Notes
Year	Title	Directors	Screenwriters	Producers	Notes
1978	Le Chant du rossignol	Yes			
1980	Pour que la guerre s'achève, les murs devraient s'écrouler	Yes	Yes		
1981	R... ne répond plus	Yes	Yes		Also cinematographers and editors
1982	Leçons d'une université volante	Yes	Yes		Also cinematographers
1983	Regarde Jonathan, Jean Louvet, son œuvre	Yes			Also editors and camera operators
1997	Gigi, Monica... et Bianca			Yes	Executive producers
2000	La Devinière			Yes	Line producer
2002	Brook by Brook			Yes	TV; co-producers
2002	Romances de terre et d'eau			Yes	
2005	Il fare politica			Yes	
2006	Rwanda, les collines parlent			Yes	
2007	Why We Can't See Each Other Outside When the Sun is Shining			Yes	
2009	Children Without a Shadow			Yes	Executive producers
2012	Un été avec Anton			Yes	TV
2013	À ciel ouvert			Yes	Co-producers

=== Shorts ===
Year	Title	Credited as			Notes
Year	Title	Directors	Screenwriters	Producers	Notes
1979	Lorsque le bateau de Leon M. descendit la Meuse pour la première fois	Yes	Yes		Documentary; also cinematographers
1987	Il court, il court, le monde	Yes	Yes		
1999	L'Héritier			Yes	Executive producers
2002	First Love			Yes	
2007	Dans l'obscurité	Yes	Yes		Segment of the anthology film To Each His Own Cinema
2008	Premier Jour			Yes	
2011	Bloody Eyes		Yes		

== Honors and accolades ==
- 2005: Grand-Cross of the Order of the Crown (Belgium)
- 2008: Film Award Cologne within the Cologne Conference
- 2011: Commander of the Walloon Merit

== Sources ==
- Sebastiano Gesù (ed.), Etica ed estetica dello sguardo. Il cinema dei fratelli Dardenne, Catania, 2006.
