= La Promesse =

1996 film by the Dardenne brothers

- Film poster
- Directed by: Jean-Pierre Dardenne; Luc Dardenne
- Written by: Jean-Pierre Dardenne; Luc Dardenne; Léon Michaux; Alphonse Badolo
- Starring: Jérémie Renier; Olivier Gourmet; Assita Ouedraogo
- Cinematography: Alain Marcoen
- Edited by: Marie-Hélène Dozo
- Music by: Jean-Marie Billy; Denis M'Punga
- Production companies: Eurimages; Les Films du Fleuve; RTBF; Samsa Film; Touza Productions
- Distributed by: Cinélibre (Belgium); ARP Sélection (France)
- Release dates: May 1996 (Cannes); 9 October 1996 (Belgium); 16 October 1996 (France)
- Running time: 90 minutes
- Countries: Belgium; Luxembourg; Tunisia; France
- Language: French
- Budget: €1.5 million
- Box office: $2.8 million

La Promesse (lit. '"The Promise"') is a 1996 drama film written and directed by the Belgian brothers Luc Dardenne and Jean-Pierre Dardenne, starring Jérémie Renier and Olivier Gourmet. The film had its world premiere in the Directors' Fortnight section parallel to the 1996 Cannes Film Festival. The film was shot in chronological order.

== Plot ==
In the Belgian city of Seraing, teenager Igor is apprenticing at a garage as a mechanic when he is called out of work by his father, Roger. Despite a lack of intimacy in their relationship, they cooperate closely (with partner-in-crime Nabil) to traffic undocumented immigrants, house them in shabby conditions, and exploit them for cheap labor. Among their most recent group of victims is the African Assita and her child, whose transportation fee her husband Hamidou, a gambler, cannot pay in full, causing friction with Roger. Nonetheless, he offers the immigrants a 50% discount on rent if they will help him with a construction project on a nearby “white house”. Meanwhile, Igor pities the family by giving them heating supplies without compensation and begins taking sexual interest in Assita.

Learning from a friend that the media is pressuring the mayor to crack down on the problem of illegal immigration, Roger has Igor lure 4 of their immigrants with the promise of traveling to America to a bar, where they are captured by police. Later, Igor brings passports to the other immigrants and sees Hamidou gambling again as well as Assita performing a superstitious ritual to rid her infant of evil spirits in the building, a notion that Igor desperately tries to dispel. He then arrives late at work, much to the frustration of the garage owner, and almost immediately receives a call about the arrival of labor inspectors, forcing him to leave the garage and quit his apprenticeship.

Rushing to the white house, Igor tells them to stop work on the construction project and leave. Everyone does except for Hamidou, who falls off of the scaffolding. Igor barely has time to promise him that he will care for Assita and the child when he has to hide him and work with Roger to bluff the inspectors, which they succeed in. Returning to Hamidou, Igor sees blood gushing from his right leg and uses his belt as a tourniquet but Roger stops him, rejects his proposal to take him to a hospital, and forces him to conceal his death by hiding his body behind the white house and covering it with cement. While repairing Assita’s heating appliance, two men arrive demanding Hamidou pay his gambling debts. Igor pays Nabil to pretend to owe Hamidou some money and give it to Assita so that she can pay off the debt collectors. Nabil agrees but squeals to Roger, who assaults Igor before making up with him and arranging a prostitute for him to lose his virginity with.

Returning to the apartment, he finds Nabil trying to sexually assault Assita, which he uses as pretext to convince her to return to Africa to prevent arousing further suspicion about Hamidou’s disappearance. However, she insists on going to the police and superstitiously believes that Hamidou has not disappeared to escape debt collectors but is actually nearby. Seeing this, Roger sends a telegram in Hamidou’s name to Assita lying about how he is in Cologne and wants to meet her at the train station there. Roger even offers to drive Assita there so that he can personally sell her into prostitution. When Igor discerns his father’s plan, he initially helps him get Assita and her child onto his van before seizing a moment when Roger is away from the van to drive it away.

Igor helps Assita report her case to the police and has them hide at his old boss’ garage for the night. When Assita mentions an Italian town where they have family, Igor tries to get her there but she insists on staying to find Hamidou. This angers him before he emotionally embraces Assita. While she sleeps, Igor leaves to call Roger, who picks up and tries to convince him to return to him, but he merely tells him where the van and keys are before hanging up. On return, he finds Assita out in the streets trying desperately to hitchhike to the hospital because her baby is running a fever. Ultimately, Igor convinces her to let him find a car in the garage to drive her there but when she asks him whether Hamidou is dead, he lies that he is not.

At the hospital, Assita’s lack of insurance leads to a high out-of-pocket cost, which Igor cannot fully cover, but African janitor Rosalie steps in. The following day, Rosalie takes Assita, the baby, and Igor to a seer who convinces Assita to take the baby to the relative in Italy. To facilitate her travels, Rosalie lends Assita her ID and Igor pawns a ring Roger gave him. Just as they prepare to leave, Roger arrives. When Igor insists on telling Assita the truth about Hamidou, Roger assaults him but is briefly knocked out by Assita, giving Igor a few seconds to chain him to a piece of machinery in the garage. Regaining consciousness, Roger desperately tries to reconcile with Igor but the latter leaves him hanging.

Walking to the train station, Igor is quiet before finally revealing to Assita the circumstances surrounding Hamidou’s death. Without a word, she heads back toward the station’s entrance and Igor follows suit.

== Cast ==
- Jérémie Renier as Igor
- Olivier Gourmet as Roger
- Assita Ouedraogo as Assita

== Critical response ==
La Promesse received critical acclaim. Review aggregation website Rotten Tomatoes gives it a 95% approval rating, based on 22 reviews, with an average score of 7.8/10. At Metacritic, which assigns a normalized rating out of 100 to reviews from mainstream critics, the film received an average score of 82, based on 17 reviews, indicating "universal acclaim".

== Awards and nominations ==
- Belgian Film Critics Association (Belgium)
  - Won: André Cavens Award for Best Film
  - Nominated: Grand Prix
- César Awards (France)
  - Nominated: Best Foreign Film
- Los Angeles Film Critics (USA)
  - Nominated: Best Foreign Film
- National Society of Film Critics (USA)
  - Won: Best Foreign Language Film
- Online Film Critics Society Awards (USA)
  - Nominated: Best Foreign Language Film
- Satellite Awards (USA)
  - Nominated: Best Motion Picture – Foreign Language
- Valladolid Film Festival (Spain)
  - Won: FIPRESCI Prize (Jean-Pierre and Luc Dardenne)
  - Won: Golden Spike (Jean-Pierre and Luc Dardenne)
