= The Son (2002 film) =

2002 film

- French theatrical release poster
- Directed by: Jean-Pierre Dardenne; Luc Dardenne
- Written by: Jean-Pierre Dardenne; Luc Dardenne
- Produced by: Jean-Pierre Dardenne; Luc Dardenne; Denis Freyd
- Starring: Olivier Gourmet; Morgan Marinne; Isabella Soupart
- Cinematography: Alain Marcoen
- Edited by: Marie-Hélène Dozo
- Production companies: Archipel 35; Les Films du Fleuve; RTBF
- Distributed by: Cinéart (Belgium); Diaphana Films (France)
- Release dates: 9 October 2002 (Belgium); 23 October 2002 (France)
- Running time: 104 minutes
- Countries: Belgium; France
- Language: French
- Box office: $70,262

The Son (French: Le Fils) is a 2002 mystery film directed by Jean-Pierre and Luc Dardenne. It revolves around the relationship between a Olivier, a solitary carpenter, and his apprentice Francis, a troubled youth.

== Plot ==
Olivier (Olivier Gourmet) is an impersonal and stern master carpenter at a youth trade training center. Despite dissatisfaction with his workload, he hesitantly takes on an additional apprentice: Francis Thorion (Morgan Marinne), a boy recently released from juvenile detention for the murder of Olivier’s son five years prior. Olivier takes interest in the boy’s training and follows him home, although Francis is unaware of their connection. He tells his ex-wife Magali (Isabella Soupart), who is remarried and pregnant, that Francis was denied from the center, but that he considered taking the boy on; she is upset by his suggestion. Francis makes an attempt to befriend Olivier, who reacts coldly. Despite this, Olivier steals Francis's keys and sneaks into his barren, impoverished apartment. Later, when Olivier offers to drive Francis home from the center, Magali confronts him, who admits that the boy is her son's murderer. She faints in shock, and when she regains consciousness she asks Olivier why he has taken the boy under his wing. He replies that he does not know.

The next day, while taking Francis on a training excursion to a sawmill, Olivier asks about the circumstances of Francis’s detention. Francis is evasive. Despite this, when the pair stops for lunch, Francis asks Olivier to be his guardian. Olivier replies inconclusively. While they play table football, Olivier coaxes Francis to admit that he killed someone. As they continue the drive, Francis confesses that he strangled a boy to death in the process of stealing a car radio. Olivier is briefly angered by Francis's confession and apparent lack of remorse. The pair arrive at the sawmill and work together until Olivier abruptly states that the boy Francis killed was his son. Despite Olivier’s pleas, Francis runs away; worried that Olivier intends to avenge his son, he hides and throws planks at Olivier. Olivier eventually catches Francis and begins to strangle him before letting go. He returns to the mill alone, only for Francis to reappear. The pair silently resumes their work.

== Cast ==
- Olivier Gourmet as Olivier
- Morgan Marinne as Francis Thorion
- Isabella Soupart as Magali
- Nassim Hassaïni as Omar
- Kevin Leroy as Raoul
- Félicien Pitsaer as Steve
- Rémy Renaud as Philippo
- Annette Closset as Training center director
- Fabian Marnette as Rino
- Jimmy Deloof as Dany
- Anne Gerard as Dany's mother

== Interpretation ==
Luc Dardenne wrote a comment about The Son in his book Au dos de nos images. Magali, the ex-wife of Olivier is very astonished that Olivier took Francis, the murderer of their son, into his workshop. She says to Olivier, "Nobody would do that." He answers, "I know." And she replies, "Then, why do you do it?" He answers, "I don't know." And Luc Dardenne wrote "We don't know either."

== Critical response ==
The Son received mostly positive reviews from film critics. Review aggregation website Rotten Tomatoes gives it an 88% approval rating, based on 57 reviews, with an average score of 7.7/10. The site's consensus reads, "Austere, finely crafted, and compelling.". At Metacritic, which assigns a normalized rating out of 100 to reviews from mainstream critics, the film received an average score of 86, based on 18 reviews, indicating "universal acclaim".

== Awards and nominations ==
Olivier Gourmet received the Best Actor Award at the 2002 Cannes Film Festival for his portrayal of the tormented Olivier.

The film received the André Cavens Award for Best Film by the Belgian Film Critics Association (UCC). Roger Ebert ranked the film No. 7 on his list of the best films of the decade (2000–2009). Paste Magazine named it one of the 50 Best Movies of the Decade (2000–2009), ranking it at No. 8.

== See also ==
- List of Belgian submissions for Academy Award for Best Foreign Language Film
