= Joseph Plateau Award =

Former Belgian Film Award

- Awarded for: Excellence in cinematic achievements
- Country: Belgium
- Presented by: Flanders International Film Festival Ghent
- First award: 1985
- Final award: 2006
- Website: josephplateauprijzen.be

A Joseph Plateau Award was an accolade presented by the Flanders International Film Festival Ghent, first awarded in 1985. The awards were given in several categories to honor cinematic achievements in the film industry. They were restricted to Belgian cinema and Belgian producers, directors, and actors. The name of the award comes from the physicist Joseph Plateau (1801–1883). They were considered to be the Belgian equivalent to the Academy Awards of the United States.

The awards ceremony was held in conjunction with the Flanders International Film Festival Ghent, which initially co-founded the event. The last award ceremony was held on March 7, 2006. Since then, two separate awards were established in Belgium in 2010: the Flemish Film Awards, named Ensor Awards, which are presented each year on the final day of the Ostend Film Festival; and the Magritte Awards, which were established by the Académie André Delvaux to recognize cinematic achievement in the francophone film industry.

== See also ==
- Cinema of Belgium
- Flanders International Film Festival Ghent
