= José María Cruz Novillo =

Spanish painter and sculptor (1936–2026)

- Born: 21 May 1936; Cuenca, Spain
- Died: 2 May 2026 (aged 89)
- Monuments: Escuela de Arte Cruz Novillo
- Other name: Cruz Novillo
- Occupation: Designer
- Known for: logos
- Website: Official website

José María Cruz Novillo (21 May 1936 – 2 May 2026) was a Spanish sculptor, engraver, painter, and designer. He was tasked with the re-branding of many entities and companies in post-Francoist Spain.

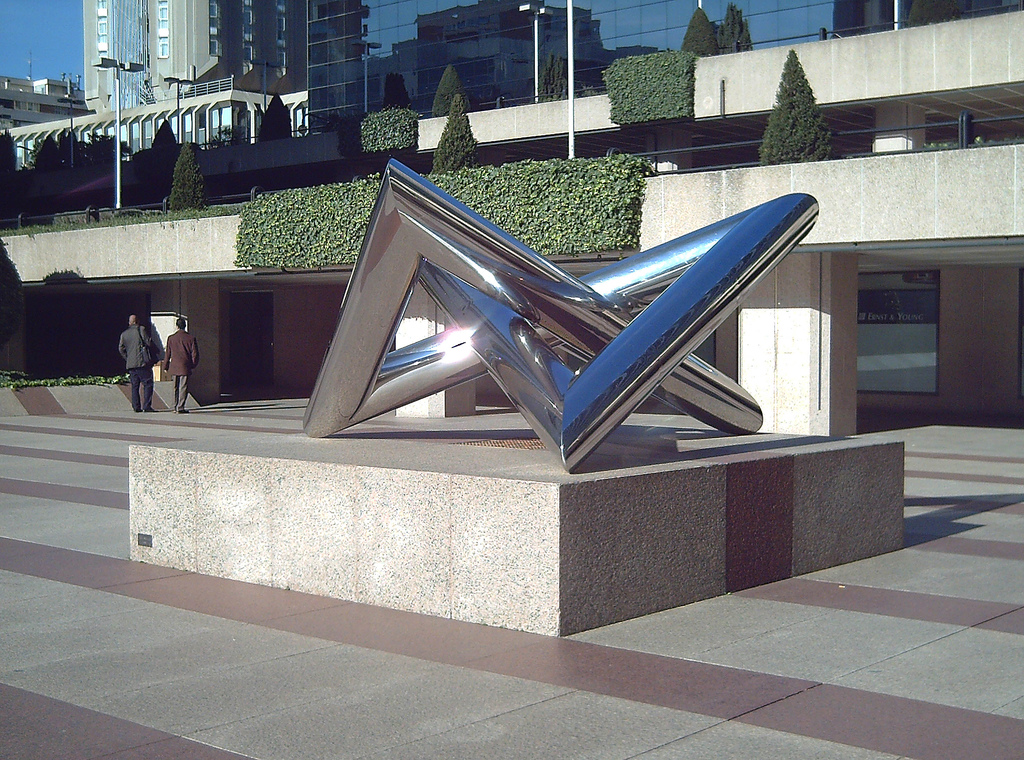
Sculpture for Plaza de Picasso, Madrid (1989).

== Life and career ==
Cruz Novillo began painting in his native town in 1950 and in 1958 moved to Madrid. In 1964, he was hired to work for the Spain Pavilion at the New York's World Fair.

He designed many logos. Among them, that of the newspaper El Mundo, the version of the fist and rose used by the PSOE, radiochain COPE, the Spanish post service, Endesa, Banco Pastor, Repsol, Fundación ONCE, Diario 16, Antena 3 Radio, the first logo of Antena 3 TV, El Economista, Renfe railways, Spanish police Cuerpo Nacional de Policía, and Tesoro Público. He designed a series of peseta bills. He also co-authored the coat of arms and the flag of the Comunidad de Madrid, with Santiago Amón Hortelano. His studio won the contest for the new institutional identity of the Government of Spain.

Cruz Novillo also designed film posters for The Spirit of the Beehive, El Sur, Ana and the Wolves, La prima Angélica, Deprisa, deprisa, Pascual Duarte, Year of Enlightment, Mama Turns 100, Hay que matar a B., La escopeta nacional, Familia, Barrio, Mondays in the Sun, and others, mostly those produced by Elías Querejeta.

He chaired the Spanish Association of Design Professionals (Asociación Española de Profesionales del Diseño, AEPD). He was also an honorary fellow of the Madrid association di_mad.

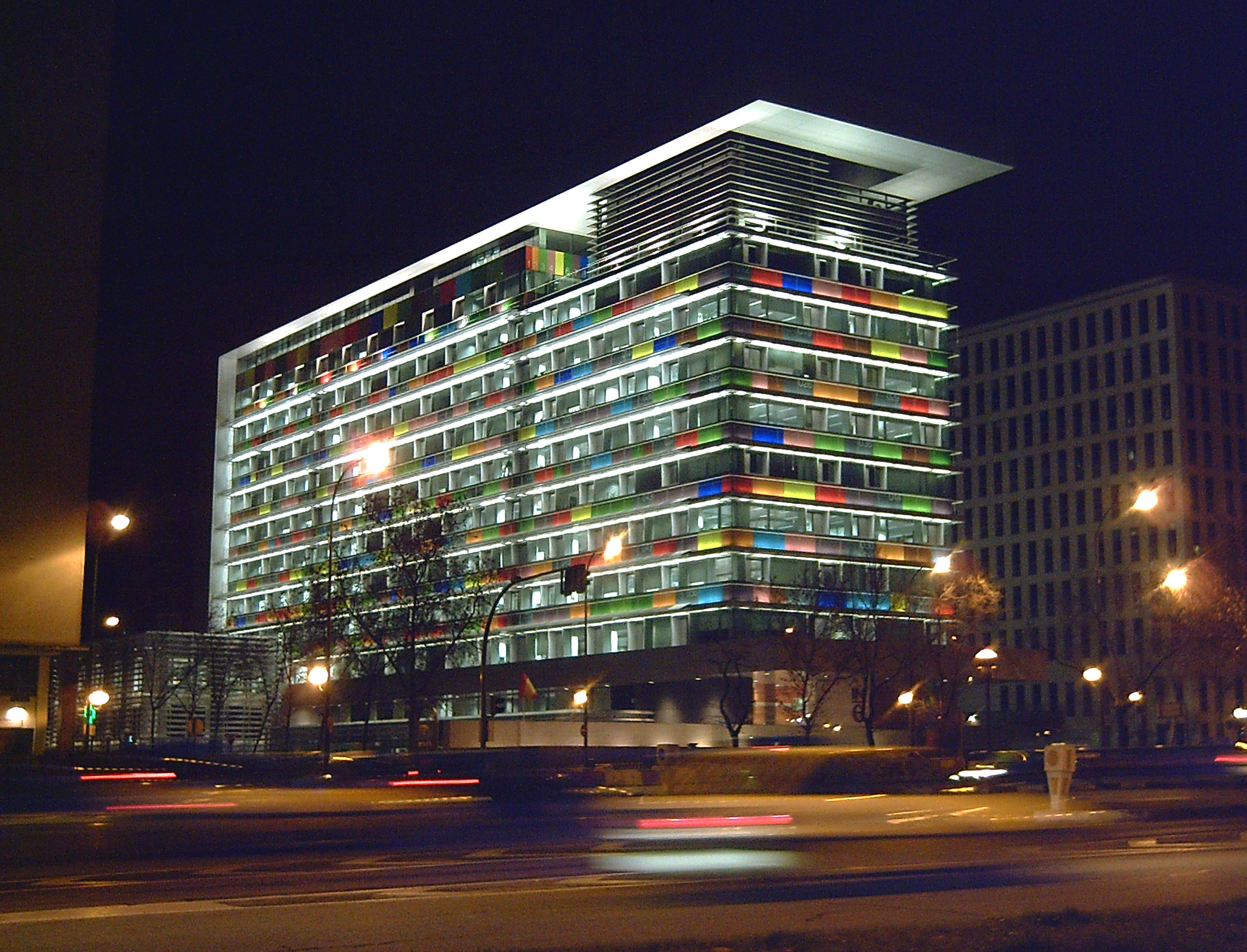
Façade of the main building of the Instituto Nacional de Estadística (Madrid, 2008)

As a sculptor, he participated in the São Paulo Art Biennial, the 1964 World's Fair in New York City, and art fairs such as FIAC, Art Basel, Art Cologne, and from 1985 on in most editions of ARCO.

From the early 1990s, Cruz Novillo focused on the development of the "Diafragma" concept. Under this concept many of his works combine a variable number of monochrome, sound, photographic or tri-dimensional elements. In 2008 he finished the "Diafragma Decafónico de Dígitos" ("Decaphonic Diaphragm of Digits") for the façade of the main building of the National Institute of Statistics of Spain, in Madrid, after its redesign by Ruiz-Larrea y Asociados. This work adds sound to produce synesthesia. In ARCO'10 he presented "Diafragma dodecafónico 8.916.100.448.256, opus 14", a "chronochromophonic" work that can be played for 3,392,732 years.

In 2007, Cruz Novillo founded the studio Cruz más Cruz with his son Pepe, a designer and architect.

In November 2006 he joined the Academia de Bellas Artes de San Fernando.

Cruz Novillo died on 2 May 2026, at the age of 89.

== PSOE fist and rose logo ==
In 1977, Cruz Novillo designed the new logo of the Spanish Socialist Workers' Party (PSOE), a redesign of the emblem created by Marc Bonnet for the French Socialist Party in 1969, and shared by a number of parties around the world as well as by the Socialist International. His work was inspired by an earlier redesign by the Dutch Labour Party (PvdA). Cruz Novillo's version was later picked up, without PSOE authorization, by the Socialist Party of Albania. The PSOE stated that it owned a copyright on the Spanish version, although it was not clear if its designer Cruz Novillo also maintained rights over it.

== Gallery ==
=== Logos ===
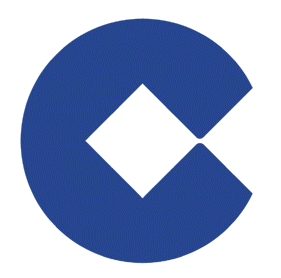
COPE

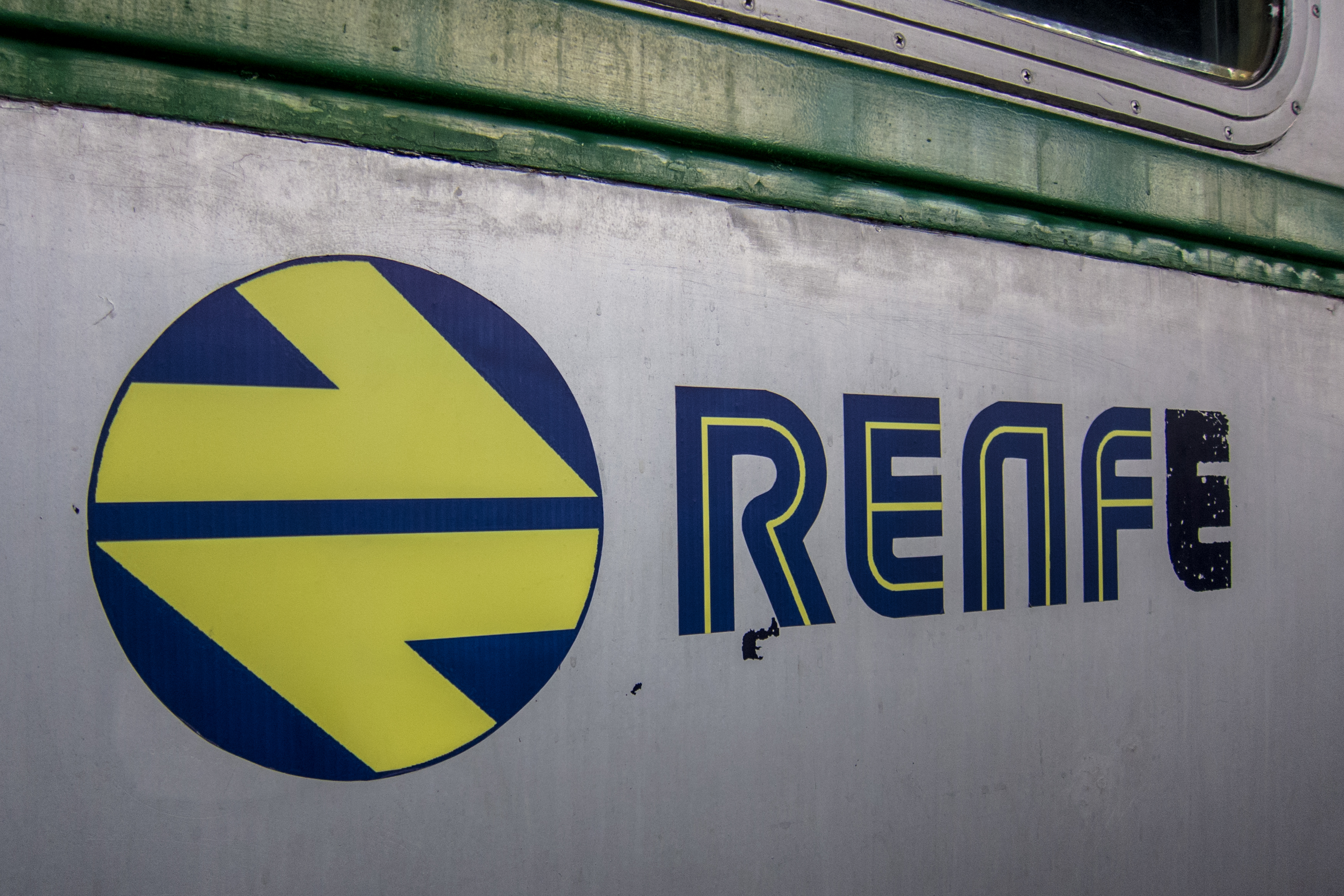
The Renfe trains displayed this logo from 1972 until 1989.

The fist and rose logo of the PSOE, in the version used between 1977 and 1998.

This logo for the Banco Popular is no longer in use.

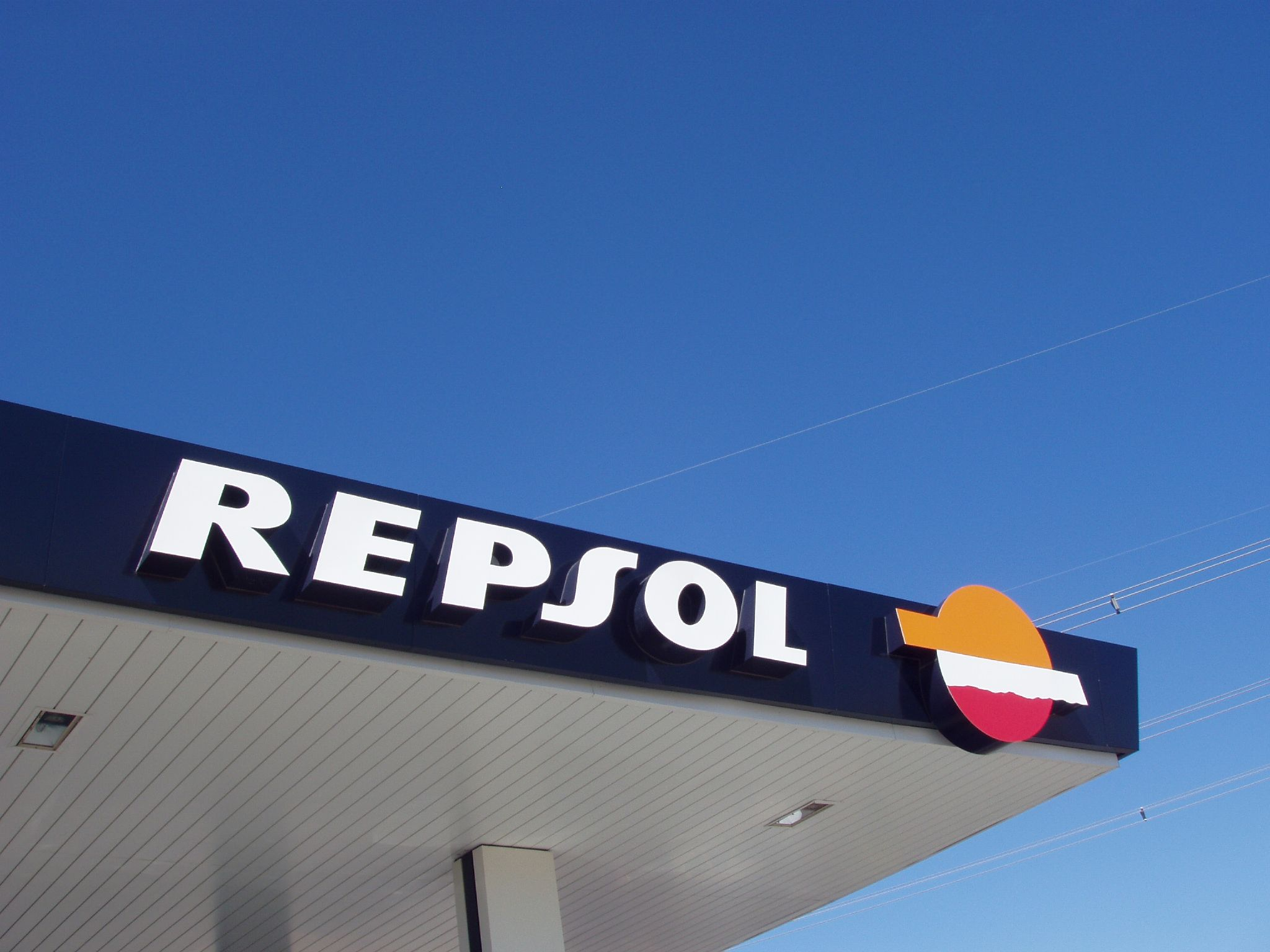
A Repsol logo like in this gas station could be found along the Spanish roads.

Diario 16 used this masthead from 1976 to 1984.

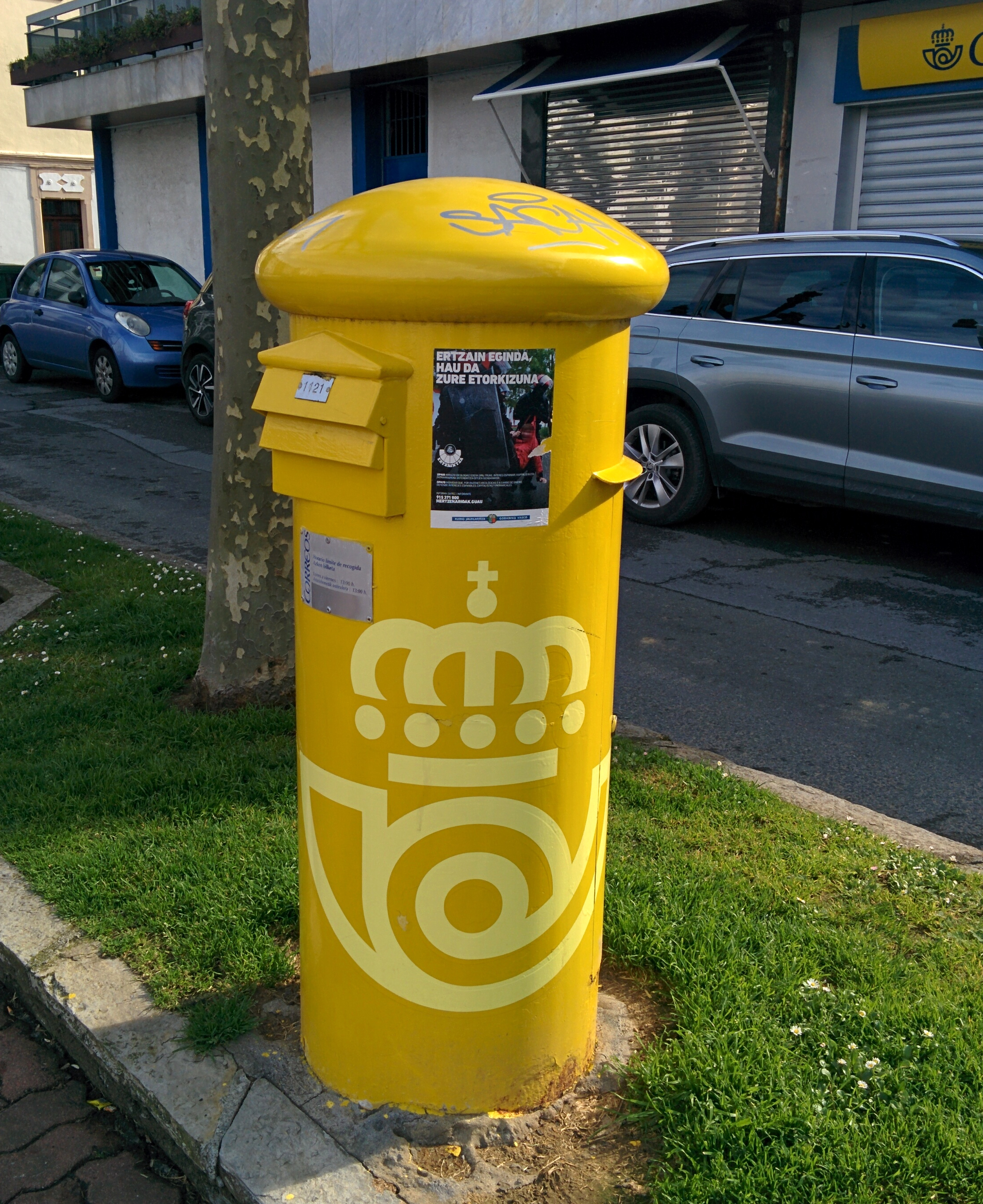
A letterbox in 2018 with the 1977 Correos logo.

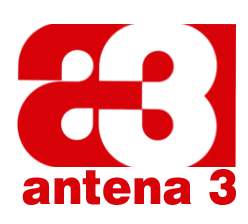
Antena 3 used this logo starting from 1982.

Red Eléctrica de España, 1987.

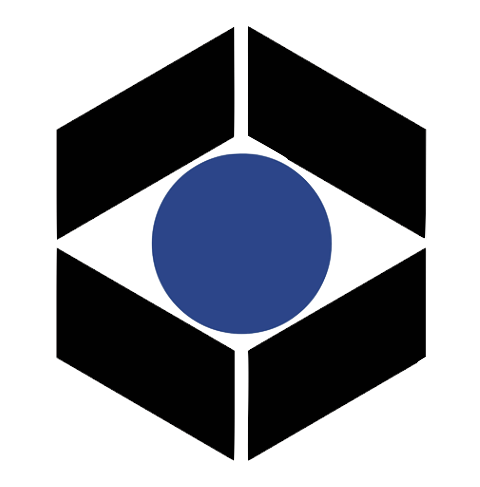
TVE used this logo from 1982 until 1990.

Coat of arms of the Community of Madrid, 1984.

Flag of the Community of Madrid, 1984.

Cuerpo Nacional de Policía, 1986.

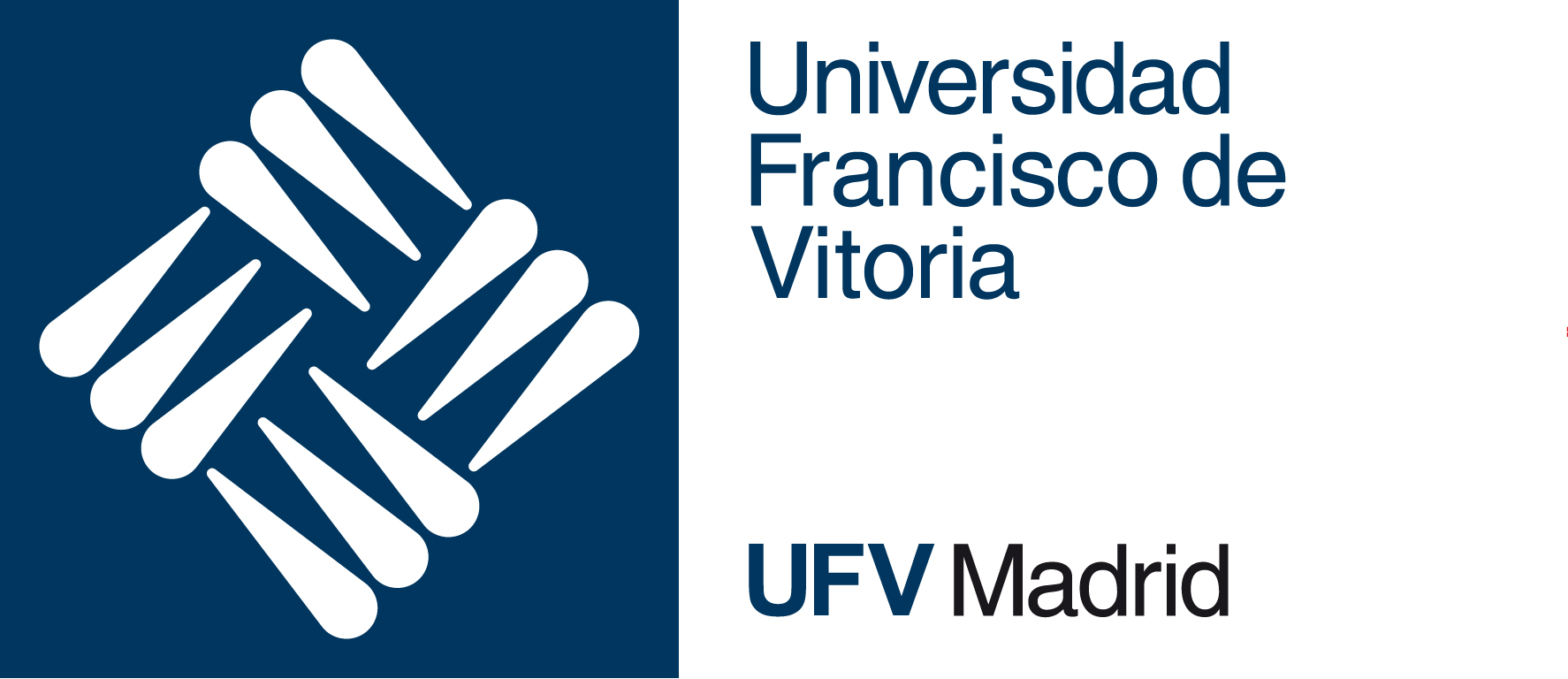
Universidad Francisco de Vitoria, 2012.

=== Bank notes ===
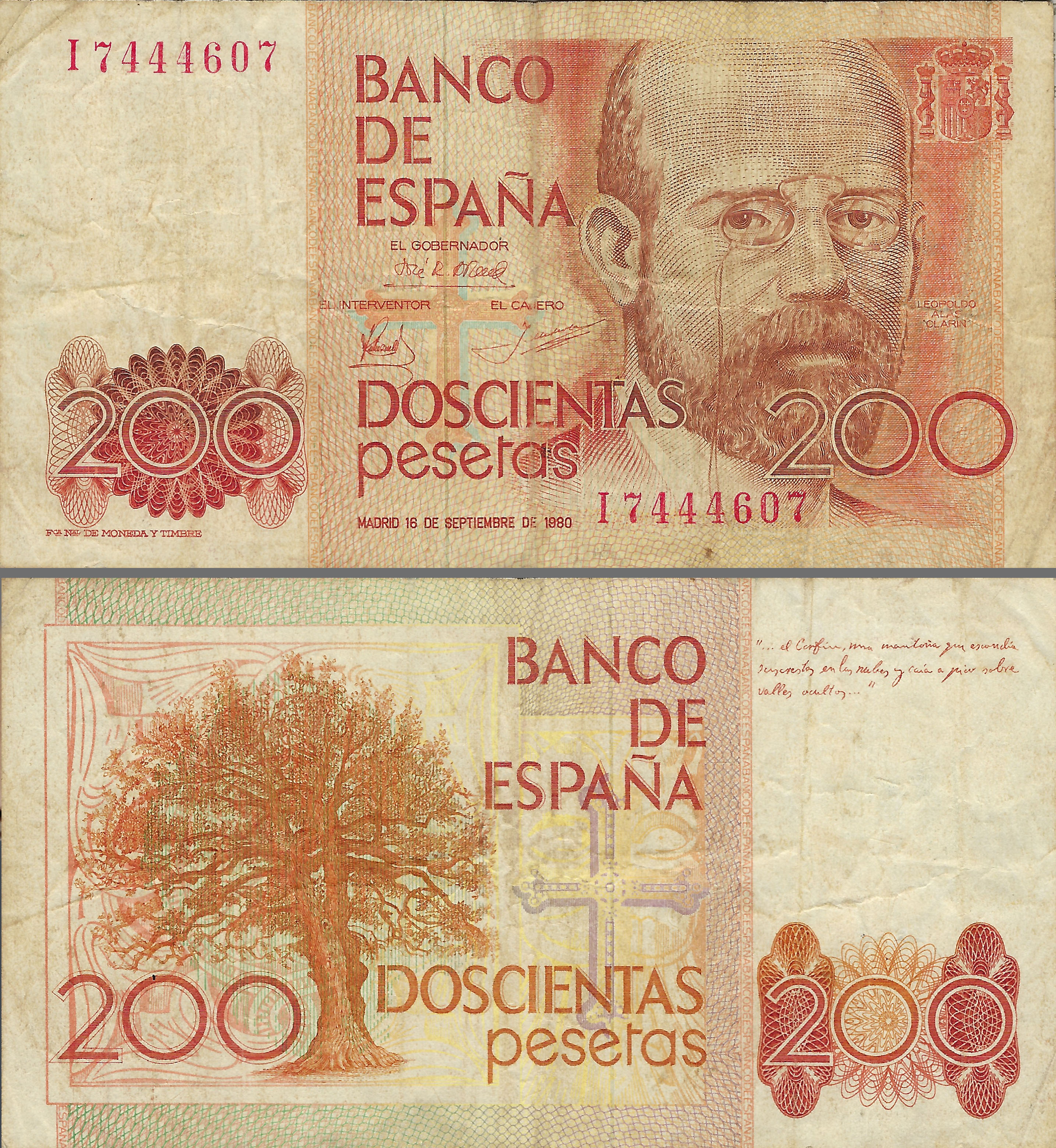
200 pesetas, 1978

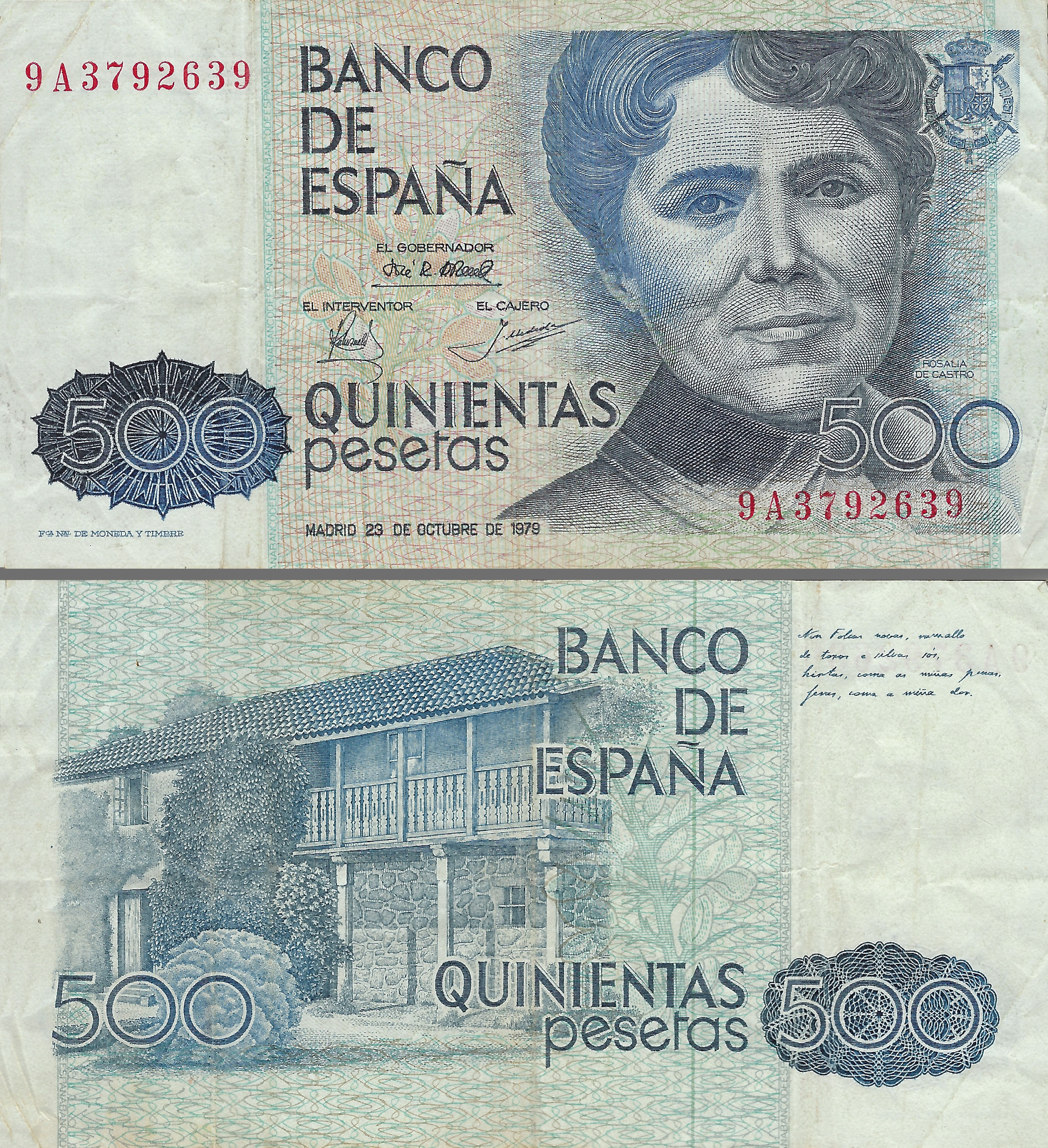
500 pesetas, 1978.

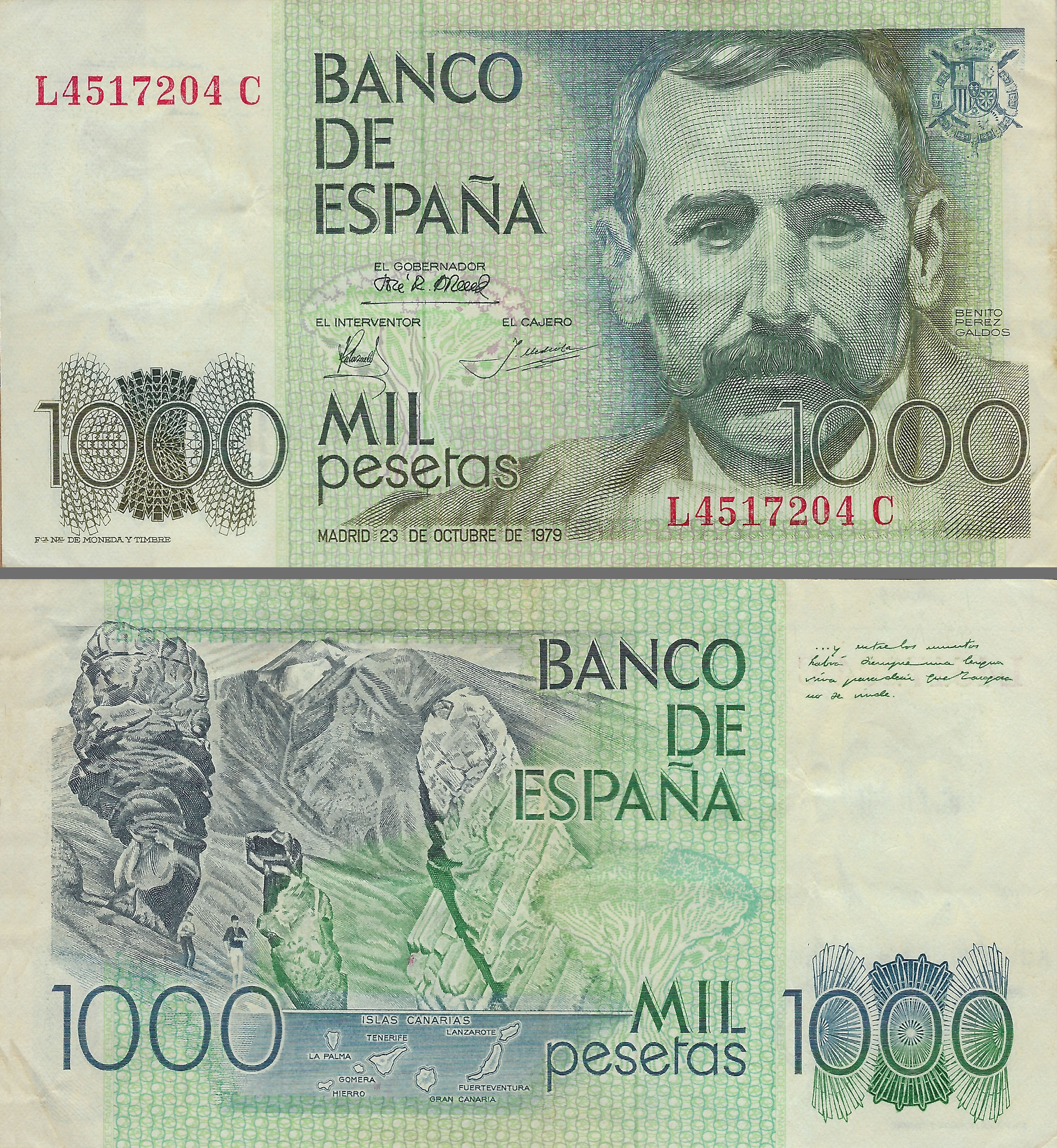
1000 pesetas, 1978.

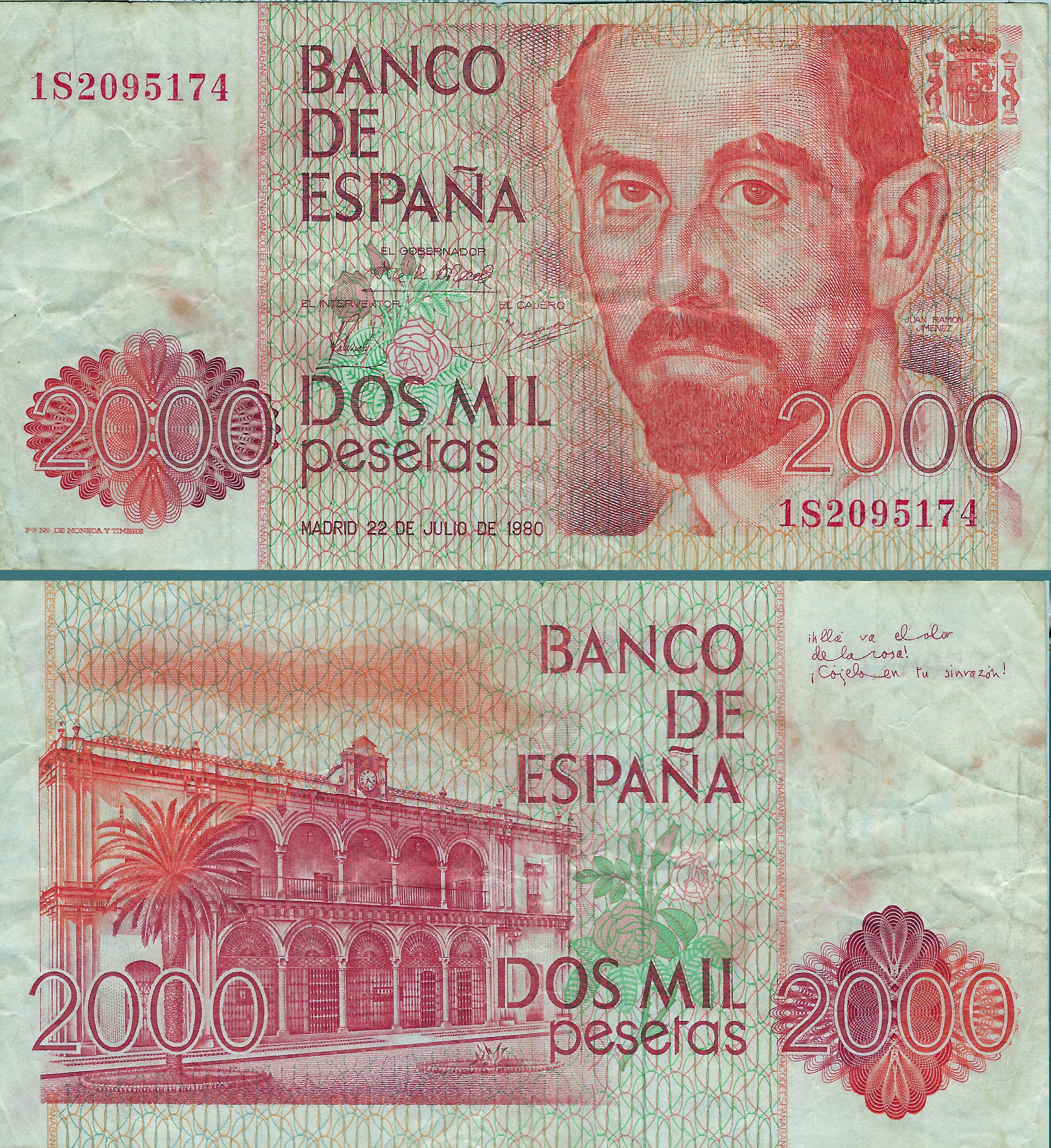
2000 pesetas, 1980.

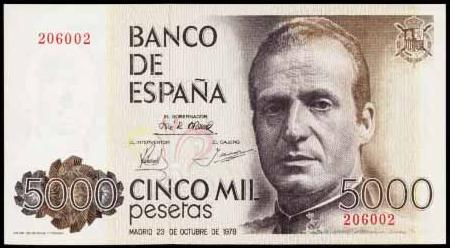
5000 pesetas, 1979.

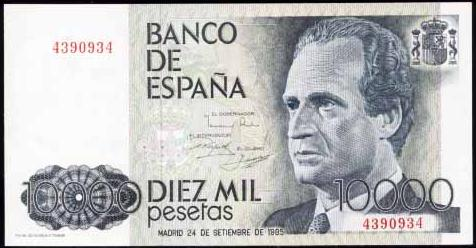
10 000 pesetas, 1985.

== Prizes ==
- Premio Nacional de Diseño (1997)
- LAUS Prize (1978)
- AEPD Prize (1993, 1995, 1996 y 2001)
- Premio Nacional de Pintura CCM (2002)
- FAD Medal (2006)
- Prize of the Society of News Design to the best designed masthead for his work for the newspaper El Economista (2006)
- Premio Castilla-La Mancha de Diseño (2008)
- Medalla de Oro al Mérito en las Bellas Artes (2012)
- Premio Gráffica (2017)
