= 28th Locarno Film Festival =

Film festival in Locarno, Switzerland

- Location: Locarno, Switzerland
- Founded: 1946
- Awards: Golden Leopard: The Son of Amir is Dead directed by Jean-Jacques Andrien
- Artistic director: Moritz de Hadeln
- Festival date: Opening: 31 July 1975; Closing: 10 August 1975
- Website: Locarno Film Festival

Locarno Film Festival
- 29th 27th

The 28th Locarno Film Festival was held from 31 July to 10 August 1975 in Locarno, Switzerland. Hungarian director Peter Bacso made a return appearance at the festival with his film Let Go of My Beard!, and Norwegian writer-director Anja Breien's film Wives competed as one of two films from Norway. The festival also featured Legacy, directed by Karen Arthur, which won best first feature.

In years past, the Locarno festival was often accused by the Swiss press of being too left-wing. This time, however, it was attacked by a conservative British critic, Alexander Walker of The Evening Standard. Walker wrote a letter of protest to festival director Moritz de Hadeln himself, which garnered some criticism in the press and annoyance from De Hadeln. Walker defended his letter in Variety and said the festival was filled with "communist propaganda". Walker complained about films which depicted the communist resistance to the fascist government of Mussolini and Italian fascism specifically in The Suspect, Down the Ancient Staircase and especially in ABCinema, a documentary on the making of Bernardo Bertolucci's film 1900.

The Golden Leopard, the festival's top prize, was awarded to The Son of Amir is Dead directed by Jean-Jacques Andrien.

== Official Sections ==
The following films were screened in these sections:

=== Main Program ===
Main Program / Feature Films In Competition

Original Title	English Title	Director(s)	Year	Production Country
Chamula		Archibaldo Burns		Mexico
Ereszd El A Szakallamat	Let Go of My Beard!	Peter Bacso	1975	Hungary
Fluchtgefahr	Escape Risk	Markus Imhoof	1974	Switzerland
Fru Inger Til Ostrat	Mrs. Inger to Ostrat	Sverre Udnaes	1975	Norway
Hustruer	Wives	Anja Breien	1975	Norway
In Gefahr Und Grösster Not Bringt Der Mittelweg Den Tod	In Danger and Deep Distress, the Middleway Spells Certain Death	Alexander Kluge, Edgar Reitz	1974	Germany
India Song		Marguerite Duras	1975	France
Kind Van De Zon	Children of the Sun	René van Nie	1975	Netherlands
Kochajmy Sie	Love Thy Neighbor	Krzysztof Wojciechowski	1975	Poland
Konfrontation	Assassination in Davos	Rolf Lyssy	1975	Switzerland
La Pomme Rouge	The Red Apple	Tolomouch Okeev	1975	Russia
Le Fils D'Amr Est Mort	The Son of Amir is Dead	Jean-Jacques Andrien	1975	Belgium
Legacy		Karen Arthur	1975	USA
Looping		Kurt Tetzlaff	1975	Germany
Per Le Antiche Scale	Down the Ancient Staircase	Alessandro Bolognini	1975	Italia
Silna Voda	High-Water	Ivan Terziev	1975	Bulgaria
Spomen	Remembrance	Ivan Nitchev	1974	Bulgaria
The Mourning Suit		Leonard Yakir	1975	Canada
Vetchni Vremena	Eternal Times	Assen Chopov	1974	Bulgaria
Xala		Ousmane Sembène	1975	Senegal

=== Out of Competition (Fuori Concorso) ===
Main Program / Feature Films Out of Competition

Original Title	English Title	Director(s)	Year	Production Country
C'Eravamo Tanto Amati	We Were so Loved	Ettore Scola	1974	Italy
French Connection II		John Frankenheimer	1975	United States
Il Sospetto	The Suspect	Francesco Maselli	1975	Italy
L'Heritage	The Legacy	Mohamed Bouamari	1975	Algeria
Pas Si Mechant Que Ca	Not so Nasty	Claude Goretta		Switzerland
Pas Si Mechant Que Ça	Not so Bad as that	Claude Goretta	1974	Switzerland
Quing Song Ling		Liu Guoquan, Jing Shusen	1973	China
The Street Fighter		Walter Hill		USA
Ziemia Obiecana	Promised Land	Andrzej Wajda	1975	Poland

=== Film Critics Week ===
FIPRESCI - International Federation of Film Critics Week
Original Title	English Title	Director(s)	Year	Production Country
ABiCinema	ABCinema	Giuseppe Bertolucci		Italy
Falsche Bewegung	False Movement	Wim Wenders		Germany
Noua	Nine	Adbelaziz Tolbi		Algeria
The Family		Lodewijk de Boer		Netherlands
Vegul	End	Gyula Maar		Hungary
Wir Bergler In Den Bergen Sind Eigentlich Nicht Schuld, Dass Wir Da Sind	We Who Dwell In The Mountains Cannot Be Blamed For Being There	Fredi M. Murer		Switzerland
Zair El Fagre		Mamduh Shukry		Egypt

=== Special Sections ===
Open Forum
English title	Original title	Director(s)	Year	Production country
Allonsanfan		Vittorio Taviani, Paolo Taviani		Italy
Film About A Woman Who...		Yvonne Rainer	1974	USA
Flaming Creatures		Jack Smith	1963	USA
Far from Home	در غربت	Sohrab Shahid-Saless	1975	Germany, Iran
Jeanne Dielman, 23 quai du Commerce, 1080 Bruxelles	Jeanne Dielman, 23, Quai Du Commerce, 1080 Bruxelles	Chantal Akerman	1975	Belgium
The Red Snowball Tree	Kalina Krasnaja	Vasiliy Shukshin	1974	Russia
Kaskara		Dore O.	1974	Germany
Makimono		Werner Nekes	1974	Germany
My Little Loves	Mes Petites Amoureuses	Jean Eustache	1974	France
Moses and Aron	Moses Und Aron	Danièle Huillet, Jean-Marie Straub		Germany
The Travelling Players	O Thiassos	Theo Angelopoulos	1975	Greece
French Provincial	Souvenirs d'en France	André Téchiné	1975	France
The Honeymoon Killers		Leonard Kastle	1970	USA
The Texas Chain Saw Massacre		Tobe Cooper	1974	USA
Swiss Films For Ticino
A Bus	Buseto	Remo Legnazzi		Switzerland
A Strike is Not a Sunday School	Ein Streik Ist Keine Sonntagsschule	Nina Stürm, Hans Stürm		Switzerland
Totò, Portrait of An Actor (1898-1967)
Destination Piovarolo	Destinazione Piovarolo	Domenico Paolella	1955	Italy
Hands Off Me!	Fermo Con Le Mani	Gero Zambuto	1937	Italy
Cops and Robbers	Guardie E Ladri	Stefano "Steno" Vanzina	1951	Italy
The Two Marshals	I Due Marescialli	Sergio Corbucci	1961	Italy
Big Deal on Madonna Street	I Soliti Ignoti	Mario Monicelli	1948	Italy
The Three Thieves	I Tre Ladri	Lionello De Felice	1954	Italy
The Gold of Naples - Episode Il Guappo	L'Oro Di Napoli Episodio Il Guappo	Vittorio De Sica	1954	Italy
Totò in Hell	Totò All'Inferno	Camillo Mastrocinque	1954	Italy
Toto vs. the Four	Totò Contro I Quattro	Stefano "Steno" Vanzina	1963	Italy
Totò Diabolicus		Stefano "Steno" Vanzina	1962	Italy

== Official Awards ==
According to the festival's website, the official awards were as follows:

=== International Jury ===
- Golden Leopard: THE SON OF AMIR IS DEAD by Jean-Jacques Andrien
- Silver Leopard: VETCHNI VREMENA by Assen Chopov
- Special Prize: DOWN THE ANCIENT STAIRCASE by Alessandro Bolognini
- Best First Feature Prize: LEGACY by Karen Arthur
- International Jury Mention: HUSTRUER by Anja Breien, FLUCHTGEFAHR by Markus Imhoof, LA POMME ROUGE by Tolomouch Okeev

=== Oecumenical Jury ===
- Oecumenical Jury Prize: NOUA by Adbelaziz Tolbi
- Oecumenical Jury Mention: HUSTRUER by Anja Breien

=== FIPRESCI Jury ===
- International Critics Award: LEGACY by Karen Arthur, THE SUSPECT by Francesco Maselli
- International Critic's special mention: WIR BERGLER IN DEN BERGEN SIND EIGENTLICH NICHT SCHULD, DASS WIR DA SIND by Fredi M. Murer
