= Permeke (film) =

Belgian documentary film

- Theatrical release poster
- Directed by: Patrick Conrad; Henri Storck
- Written by: Patrick Conrad; Henri Storck; Pierre Drouot
- Produced by: Pierre Drouot
- Cinematography: Marc Koninckx
- Edited by: Ton de Graaff
- Music by: David Darling; John Surman
- Release date: 1985
- Running time: 95 minutes
- Country: Belgium
- Language: Dutch

Permeke is a 1985 documentary film directed by Patrick Conrad and Henri Storck. It tells the story of Anna, a 20-year-old photographer, who becomes interested by the works of Constant Permeke, Belgian painter and sculptor considered the leading figure of Flemish expressionism.

Permeke was produced by Conrad, Storck and Pierre Drouot, and features appearances by Jan Decleir, Jean-Michel Arnold, and Hugo Claus, among others. In December 1985, Permeke received the André Cavens Award for Best Film given by the Belgian Film Critics Association (UCC).
