= Le Grand Paysage d'Alexis Droeven =

1981 Belgian film by Jean-Jacques Andrien

- Theatrical release poster
- Directed by: Jean-Jacques Andrien
- Starring: Jan Decleir
- Cinematography: Georges Barsky
- Release date: February 1981
- Running time: 88 minutes
- Country: Belgium
- Language: French

Le Grand Paysage d'Alexis Droeven is a 1981 Belgian drama film directed by Jean-Jacques Andrien. The French-language film was entered into the 31st Berlin International Film Festival where it won an Honourable Mention. It also received the André Cavens Award for Best Film by the Belgian Film Critics Association (UCC). The film was selected as the Belgian entry for the Best Foreign Language Film at the 54th Academy Awards, but was not accepted as a nominee.

== Cast ==
- Jan Decleir as Jacob
- Nicole Garcia as Elizabeth
- Maurice Garrel as Alexis
- Jerzy Radziwilowicz as Jean-Pierre

== See also ==
- List of submissions to the 54th Academy Awards for Best Foreign Language Film
- List of Belgian submissions for the Academy Award for Best Foreign Language Film
