= Chris Vermorcken =

Belgian film director and screenwriter

Chris Vermorcken is a Belgian film director and screenwriter. Her 1980 documentary film, My Name Is Anna Magnani, received the André Cavens Award for Best Film given by the Belgian Film Critics Association (UCC). Her other works include the TV series The New You Asked for It and the documentary films The Hollywood Messenger (1985), Leonor Fini (1988), and Vers des rêves impossibles (1999).
