= Belgian general strike of 1932 =

General strike in Belgium

General strike
- 1932; Part of General strikes in Belgium
- Date: July 1932
- Location: Sillon industriel
- Caused by: Great Depression
- Methods: Wildcat strikes

Parties
Miners

Number
100,000	

Casualties and losses
2	

The general strike of 1932 was a major strike which broke out in Belgium on 7 July 1932. It began after a spontaneous strike by coal miners in the Borinage and involved communist agitation amid a severe decrease in living standards and real wages, as well as high unemployment, caused by the Great Depression. Two people were killed during the strike which only ended on 9 September 1932.

The strike served as the inspiration for the 1934 documentary film Misère au Borinage directed by Henri Storck and Joris Ivens.

== Sources ==
- Deruette, Serge (1994). Mineurs en lutte! La grève générale de l'été '32. Brussels: Fondation Joseph Jacquemotte. ISBN 9782930109008.
- De Wasseige, Yves (1952). "La grève, Phénomène économique et sociologique. Étude inductive des conflits du travail en Belgique de 1920 à 1940". Bulletin de l'Institut de Recherches Économiques et Sociales. 18 (7): 663–724. doi:10.1017/S0770451800047552. ISSN 1373-9719. JSTOR 40730313. S2CID 251354370.
- Moreews, Alain (2015). La grève des mineurs du Borinage : (Belgique, 1932-1936). Paris: L'Harmattan. ISBN 9782343061993.
