= Gabriel's Dream =

- Directed by: Anne Lévy-Morelle
- Produced by: Thierry de Coster
- Cinematography: Rémon Fromont
- Edited by: Gervaise Demeure; Emmanuelle Dupuis
- Music by: Ivan Georgiev
- Release date: 1997
- Running time: 83 minutes
- Countries: Belgium; France
- Language: French

Gabriel's Dream (French: Le Rêve de Gabriel) is a documentary film directed by Anne Lévy-Morelle. It tells the story of Gabriel de Halleux, an established businessman who, in the late 1940s, decided to leave everything and start a new life in Chile Chico, in the depths of the Chilean Patagonia. In December 1997, Gabriel's Dream received the André Cavens Award for Best Film given by the Belgian Film Critics Association (UCC).

== Synopsis ==
This "authentic epic" (a term the director prefers to "documentary") tells the story of a well-established man, Gabriel de Halleux, who nevertheless decides at the end of the 1940s to leave everything behind and start his life anew in Chile Chico, in the depths of Chilean Patagonia.

In early 2006, Anné Lévy-Morelle was preparing her third work: Le Berceau de l'enfant pisseur
