= Rosie (1998 film) =

- Theatrical release poster
- Directed by: Patrice Toye
- Written by: Patrice Toye
- Produced by: Antonino Lombardo
- Starring: Aranka Coppens; Sara de Roo; Dirk Roofthooft
- Cinematography: Richard Van Oosterhout
- Edited by: Ludo Troch
- Music by: John Parish
- Production company: Prime Time
- Distributed by: Cinélibre (Belgium)
- Release date: 18 November 1998
- Running time: 97 minutes
- Countries: Belgium; France
- Language: Dutch

Rosie is a 1998 drama film written and directed by Patrice Toye. It was screened at the 1998 Toronto International Film Festival. It received the André Cavens Award for Best Film given by the Belgian Film Critics Association (UCC). Rosie was selected as the Belgian entry for the Best Foreign Language Film at the 71st Academy Awards, but was not nominated.

== Plot ==
Rosie, a teenage girl in Belgium, attempts to deal with her dysfunctional family and an adult world that she does not understand.

== Cast ==
- Aranka Coppens as Rosie
- Sara de Roo as Irene
- Dirk Roofthooft as Bernard
- Joost Wijnant as Jimi

== Reception ==
Rotten Tomatoes, a review aggregator, reports that 67% of six surveyed critics gave the film a positive review; the average rating was 6.1/10. Glenn Lovell of Variety called it "the most incisive look at adolescent angst since Peter Jackson’s Heavenly Creatures". Janet Maslin of The New York Times wrote that film's decision to hide plot details until the climax "adds suspense, and eventually chills, to what would otherwise be an all too familiar tale of domestic dysfunction".

== See also ==
- List of submissions to the 71st Academy Awards for Best Foreign Language Film
- List of Belgian submissions for the Academy Award for Best Foreign Language Film
