= In the Name of the Führer =

- Directed by: Lydia Chagoll
- Release date: 1977
- Running time: 87 minutes
- Country: Belgium

In the Name of the Führer (Dutch: In naam van de Fuehrer) is a 1977 Belgian documentary film directed by Lydia Chagoll. It received the André Cavens Award for Best Film given by the Belgian Film Critics Association (UCC).
