= Lydia Chagoll =

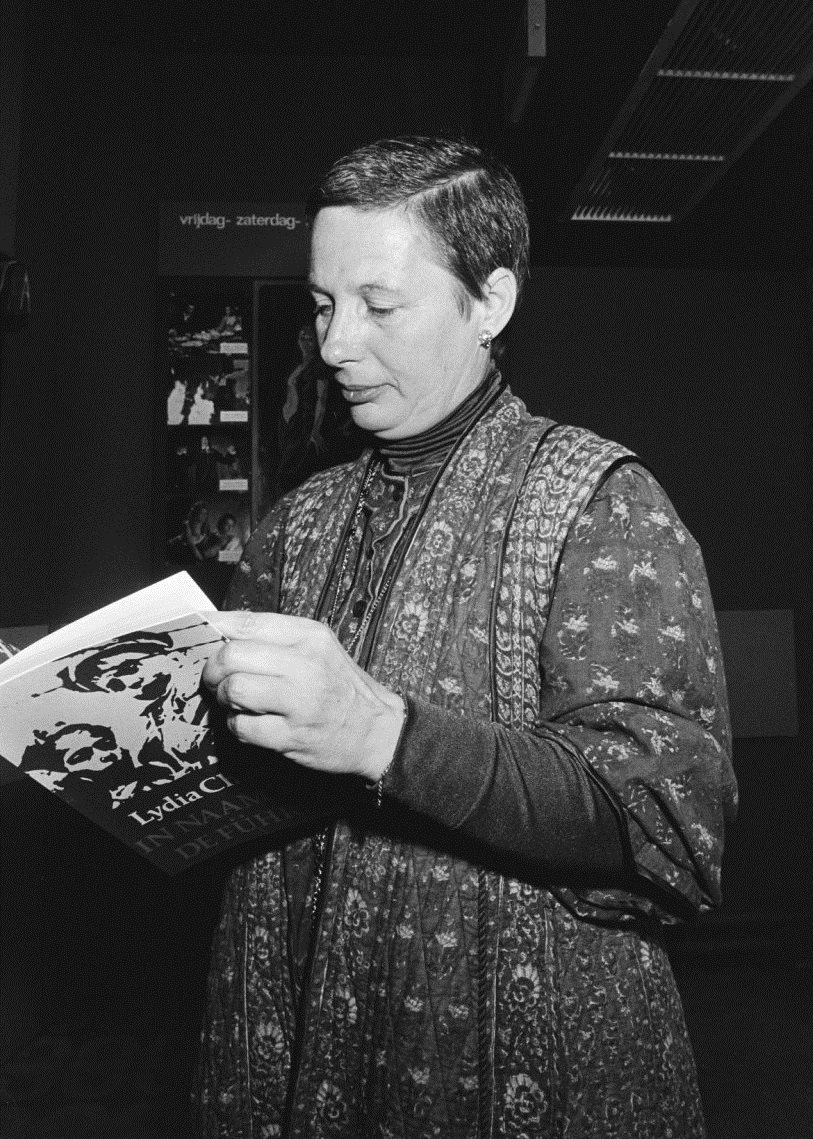
- Lydia Chagoll in 1979 at the presentation of: In naam van de Führer
- Born: Lydia Aldewereld; 16 June 1931; Voorburg, Netherlands
- Died: 23 June 2020 (aged 89); Overijse, Belgium
- Occupations: writer, film director, dancer
- Known for: In the Name of the Führer, Hirohito, emperor of Japan, a forgotten war criminal?

Lydia Chagoll (16 June 1931 – 23 June 2020) was a Dutch born dancer, choreographer, film director, screenwriter, writer and actress.

== Biography ==
Lydia was born in Voorburg as Lydia Aldewereld from Jewish parents. When she was young she moved to Brussels, Belgium. During World War II the family fled, and ended up in a Japanese Internment Camp in Indonesia. In 1942, she was held in Tjideng and transferred to Grogol in August 1943. She returned to Tjideng in August 1944. Her novels Zes jaar en zes maanden (1981) (Six years and six months) and Hirohito, keizer van Japan. Een vergeten oorlogsmisdadiger? (1988) (Hirohito, emperor of Japan, a forgotten war criminal?) dealt with that period. When the family returned to the Netherlands, they discovered that all their family members had been killed.

In 1952, she took the stage name Lydia Chagoll, and took on Belgian nationality. Chagoll first graduated from the Vrije Universiteit Brussel, and continued her studies at École Superieure des Études Choréographiques (Higher school for choreography) in Paris and began to teach dancing. She directed the 1977 documentary film In the Name of the Führer (In naam van de Führer), which received the André Cavens Award for Best Film given by the Belgian Film Critics Association (UCC). In 1982, she directed Voor de glimlach van een kind (For the smile of a child) about child abuse. She campaigned throughout Belgium and in 1983 founded SOS Enfants/SOS Kinderen. In 2014, at the age of 83, she directed Ma Bister about the persecution of the Romani. She was awarded the Prijs voor de Democratie (Price for Democracy) for Ma Bister.

On 23 June 2020, Lydia died in Overijse, Belgium. She insisted that the death would be kept a secret until after her cremation.
