= List of Spanish films of 1981 =

A list of films produced in Spain in 1981 (see 1981 in film).

== 1981 ==
Title	Director	Cast	Genre	Release date	Notes	Ref.
1981
Bodas de sangre	Carlos Saura	Antonio Gades, Cristina Hoyos	Musical		Based on Federico García Lorca's Bodas de sangre. Screened at the 1981 Cannes Film Festival.	
Deprisa, Deprisa	Carlos Saura	real marginalized teneenagers	Social, crime		Golden Bear winner at Berlin	
La fuga de Segovia	Imanol Uribe			6 November		
Matad al buitro	José Truchado					
Maravillas	Manuel Gutiérrez Aragón	Cristina Marcos, Fernando Fernán Gómez		26 February	Entered into the 31st Berlin International Film Festival	
La mujer del ministro	Eloy de la Iglesia			27 August		
Patrimonio nacional	Luis García Berlanga	Luis Escobar, José Luis López Vázquez, Mary Santpere, Amparo Soler Leal, José Luis de Vilallonga, Agustín González		20 March		
Jalea real	Carles Mira			2 November		
El crimen de Cuenca	Pilar Miró			17 August		
