= Il y a (disambiguation) =

Il y a is the equivalent of the English existential clause "there is". Refer to French grammar#Existential clauses

Il y a may also refer to:

== Film and television ==
- Il y a des jours... et des lunes, French original title of There Were Days... and Moons, a 1990 film directed by Claude Lelouch
- Il y a longtemps que je t'aime, French original title of I've Loved You So Long, a 2008 film directed by Philippe Claudel
- Il y a un train toutes les heures, French original title of A Train Leaves in Every Hour, a 1961 Belgian film directed by André Cavens

== Music ==
- "Il y a" (song), a 2014 song by the French musical duo Fréro Delavega
- "Il y aura toujours des violons", French entry in the Eurovision Song Contest 1978, performed in French by Joël Prévost
- "Il y a trop de gens qui t'aiment", 1999 song recorded by French artist Hélène Ségara
- Il y a un sorcier à Champignac, album by Franquin, from the Spirou et Fantasio series
