= André Cavens =

Belgian film director, film producer and screenwriter

- Born: 1 October 1912; Brussels, Belgium
- Died: 9 April 1971 (aged 58)
- Occupation(s): Film director, film producer, writer, editor
- Years active: 1961–1968

André Cavens (1 October 1912 – 9 April 1971), born in Brussels, Uccle, was a Belgian film director, film producer and screenwriter.

== Career ==
His career started in 1961 as the director and producer of the drama A Train Leaves in Every Hour (Il y a un train toutes les heures). The film starred Evelyne Axell and was nominated for the Golden Bear at the 12th Berlin International Film Festival. In 1965, he directed the short La présence désolée. Cavens returned to film work in 1968 writing and directing the drama Michaella.

Since 1976, the Belgian Film Critics Association presents the André Cavens Award to recognize the best Belgian film of the year.
