= My Name Is Anna Magnani =

- Directed by: Chris Vermorcken
- Screenplay by: Chris Vermorcken
- Produced by: Jacqueline Pierreux
- Cinematography: Rufus Bohez; Romano Scavolini; Gianfranco Transunto
- Edited by: Eva Houdova; Yves Van Herstraeten
- Music by: Willy De Maesschaelck
- Release date: October 1979
- Running time: 105 minutes
- Countries: Belgium; Italy
- Languages: French; Italian

My Name Is Anna Magnani (Italian: Io sono Anna Magnani) is a 1979 documentary film written and directed by Chris Vermorcken. It is about the life and career of Italian actress Anna Magnani. The film features appearances and interviews by Federico Fellini, Leonor Fini, Claude Autant-Lara, Giulietta Masina, Marcello Mastroianni, and Franco Zeffirelli, among others.

My Name Is Anna Magnani received the André Cavens Award for Best Film given by the Belgian Film Critics Association (UCC).
