= André Cavens Award =

- Awarded for: Excellence in cinematic achievement
- Presented by: Belgian Film Critics Association
- First award: 1976
- Currently held by: Young Mothers (2025)

The André Cavens Award (French: Prix André-Cavens) is an accolade presented annually by the Belgian Film Critics Association (UCC), an organization of film critics from publications based in Brussels. The André Cavens Award was introduced in 1976 by the organizing committee to honor cinematic achievement in Belgium. The name of the award comes from film director André Cavens.

The most awarded filmmakers are Jean-Pierre and Luc Dardenne with six awards, followed by Jaco Van Dormael, Joachim Lafosse, and Fien Troch with three. Other multiple winners are Jean-Jacques Andrien, André Delvaux, and Lukas Dhont with two awards each. As of 2025, Young Mothers is the most recent winner.

== Winners ==
=== 1970s ===
Year	English title	Original title	Director(s)	Ref.
1976	The Son of Amir Is Dead	Le Fils d'Amr est mort	Jean-Jacques Andrien	
1977	In the Name of the Führer	In naam van de Fuehrer	Lydia Chagoll	
1978	Les Rendez-vous d'Anna		Chantal Akerman	
1979	Woman Between Wolf and Dog	Een vrouw tussen hond en wolf	André Delvaux	

=== 1980s ===
Year	English title	Original title	Director(s)	Ref.
1980	My Name Is Anna Magnani	Io sono Anna Magnani	Chris Vermorcken	
1981	Le Grand Paysage d'Alexis Droeven		Jean-Jacques Andrien	
1982	Le Lit		Marion Hänsel	
1983	Brussels by Night		Marc Didden	
1985	Permeke		Patrick Conrad and Henri Storck	
1986	The van Paemel Family	Het gezin van Paemel	Paul Cammermans	
1987	Wedding in Galilee	Urs al-Jalil	Michel Khleifi	
1988	The Abyss	L'Œuvre au noir	André Delvaux	
1989	Wait Until Spring, Bandini		Dominique Deruddere	

=== 1990s ===
Year	English title	Original title	Director(s)	Ref.
1990	Monsieur		Jean-Philippe Toussaint	
1991	Toto the Hero	Toto le Héros	Jaco Van Dormael	
1992	Man Bites Dog	C'est arrivé près de chez vous	Rémy Belvaux, André Bonzel and Benoît Poelvoorde	
1993	Just Friends		Marc-Henri Wajnberg	
1994	The Sexual Life of the Belgians	La Vie sexuelle des Belges 1950–1978	Jan Bucquoy	
1995	Manneken Pis		Frank Van Passel	
1996	La Promesse		Jean-Pierre and Luc Dardenne	
1997	Gabriel's Dream	Le rêve de Gabriel	Anne Lévy-Morelle	
1998	Rosie		Patrice Toye	
1999	Rosetta		Jean-Pierre and Luc Dardenne	

=== 2000s ===
Year	English title	Original title	Director(s)	Ref.
2000	Lijmen/Het Been		Robbe De Hert	
2001	No Man's Land	Ničija zemlja	Danis Tanović	
2002	The Son	Le Fils	Jean-Pierre and Luc Dardenne	
2003	On the Run	Cavale	Lucas Belvaux	
2003	An Amazing Couple	Un couple épatant	Lucas Belvaux	
2003	After Life	Après la vie	Lucas Belvaux	
2004	Gilles' Wife	La Femme de Gilles	Frédéric Fonteyne	
2005	L'Enfant		Jean-Pierre and Luc Dardenne	
2006	The Only One	Vidange perdue	Geoffrey Enthoven	
2007	Private Property	Nue propriété	Joachim Lafosse	
2008	Eldorado		Bouli Lanners	
2009	Unspoken		Fien Troch	

=== 2010s ===
Year	English title	Original title	Director(s)	Ref.
2010	Mr. Nobody		Jaco Van Dormael	
2011	Bullhead	Rundskop	Michaël R. Roskam	
2012	Our Children	À perdre la raison	Joachim Lafosse	
2013	Kid		Fien Troch	
2014	Two Days, One Night	Deux jours, une nuit	Jean-Pierre and Luc Dardenne	
2015	The Brand New Testament	Le Tout Nouveau Testament	Jaco Van Dormael	
2016	After Love	L'Économie du couple	Joachim Lafosse	
2017	Home		Fien Troch	
2018	Girl		Lukas Dhont	
2019	Our Mothers	Nuestras madres	César Díaz	

=== 2020s ===
Year	English title	Original title	Director(s)	Ref.
2020	Adoration		Fabrice Du Welz	
2021	Playground	Un monde	Laura Wandel	
2022	Close		Lukas Dhont	
2023	Love According to Dalva	Dalva	Emmanuelle Nicot	
2024	Night Call	La nuit se traîne	Michiel Blanchart	
2024	Soundtrack to a Coup d'Etat		Johan Grimonprez	
2025	Young Mothers	Jeunes mères	Jean-Pierre and Luc Dardenne	

== Multiple winners ==
Eight directors or co-directors have won the award multiple times. Three of them (^{‡}) have also received a nomination for the Grand Prix.

Number of wins	Director(s)	Films
6	Jean-Pierre and Luc Dardenne ‡	La Promesse (1996), Rosetta (1999), The Son (2002), L'Enfant (2005), Two Days, One Night (2014), Young Mothers (2025)
3	Jaco Van Dormael	Toto the Hero (1991), Mr. Nobody (2010), The Brand New Testament (2015)
3	Joachim Lafosse	Private Property (2007), Our Children (2012), After Love (2016)
3	Fien Troch	Unspoken (2009), Kid (2013), Home (2017)
2	Jean-Jacques Andrien	The Son of Amir Is Dead (1976), Le Grand Paysage d'Alexis Droeven (1981)
2	André Delvaux	Woman Between Wolf and Dog (1979), The Abyss (1988)
2	Lukas Dhont ‡	Girl (2018), Close (2022)
