= Anne Lévy-Morelle =

Belgian film director and writer

- Born: 19 February 1961 (age 64); Brussels, Belgium
- Occupation(s): Film director, writer

Anne Lévy-Morelle (born 19 February 1961) is a Belgian film director and writer. After graduating from the Université libre de Bruxelles, she attended the INSAS in Brussels and began directing short films and collaborating with numerous Belgian directors.

She worked as assistant director with Jean-Pierre and Luc Dardenne and Jaco Van Dormael, among others. Lévy-Morelle wrote and directed the short films Les tentations d'Albert (1989) and Manfred (1993). She directed the documentary film Gabriel's Dream in 1997, which received the André Cavens Award for Best Film given by the Belgian Film Critics Association (UCC). Her follow-up, Through the Walls of the Heart (2002), premiered at the Karlovy Vary International Film Festival. In 2008, she wrote and directed The Cradle of the Little Pisser.
