= Kids from the Coal Land: A Letter to Henri Storck =

Kids from the Coal Land: A Letter to Henri Storck (French: Les enfants du Borinage - Lettre a Henri Storck) is a 2000 documentary film by director Patric Jean about the former mining district Borinage in Wallonia (Belgium).

The film is a follow-up/homage to Henri Storck's previous 1933 documentary about the Borinage, Misère au Borinage.

== Awards ==
- IDFA Award for best Mid-Length Documentary (1999)
