= Maravillas (film) =

1981 film

- Theatrical release poster
- Directed by: Manuel Gutiérrez Aragón
- Written by: Manuel Gutiérrez Aragón; Luis Megino
- Produced by: Luis Megino
- Starring: Fernando Fernán Gómez; Cristina Marcos
- Cinematography: Teo Escamilla
- Edited by: José Salcedo
- Music by: Nina Hagen
- Production company: Arándano
- Distributed by: Los Films del Búho
- Release dates: February 1981 (Berlinale); 26 February 1981 (Spain)
- Running time: 95 minutes
- Country: Spain
- Language: Spanish

Maravillas is a 1981 Spanish drama film directed by Manuel Gutiérrez Aragón which stars Cristina Marcos as the title character alongside Fernando Fernán Gómez. It was entered into the 31st Berlin International Film Festival.

== Plot ==
Set in Madrid, the plot follows Maravillas, a 15-year-old girl gifted with a ring by her Sephardic Jewish godfather Salomón on the day of her first communion.

== Cast ==
- Cristina Marcos as Maravillas
- Fernando Fernán Gómez as Fernando
- Enrique San Francisco as Chessman
- Francisco Merino as Salomón
- León Klimovsky as Santos
- Eduardo McGregor as Simón
- Gérard Tichy as Benito
- Jorge Rigaud as Tomás
- José Luis Fernández as Pirri
- Yolanda Medina as Loles
- Miguel Molina as Miqui
- José Manuel Cervino as juez
- Charo Zapardiel
- Francisco Catalá as perista
- Ofelia Angélica
- Juan Jesús Valverde
- Emilio Rodríguez

== Production ==
The film was shot in Madrid.

== Release ==
The film screened at the 31st Berlin International Film Festival in February 1981. Distributed by Los Films del Búho. the film was released theatrically in Spain on 26 February 1981.

== See also ==
- List of Spanish films of 1981
