= Barbara Grabowska =

Polish actress (1954–1994)

- Born: 28 November 1954; Zabrze, Poland
- Died: 12 August 1994 (aged 39); Częstochowa, Poland
- Occupation: Actress
- Years active: 1980-1989

Barbara Grabowska (28 November 1954 – 12 August 1994) was a Polish actress. She starred in the 1981 film Fever. The film was entered into the 31st Berlin International Film Festival, where Grabowska won the Silver Bear for Best Actress.

She died aged 39. Her body was found near the railroad tracks near Częstochowa.

== Selected filmography ==
- Fever (1981)
- The Last Ferry (1989)
