= Henri Storck =

Belgian writer, filmmaker and documentarist

- Born: 5 September 1907; Ostend, Belgium
- Died: 17 September 1999 (aged 92); Uccle, Belgium
- Occupations: Author, filmmaker

Henri Storck (5 September 1907 – 17 September 1999) was a Belgian writer, filmmaker and documentarist.

In 1933, he directed, with Joris Ivens, Misère au Borinage, a film about the miners in the Borinage area. The film was banned in several countries, but he gained worldwide notoriety from the film becoming a milestone in activist cinema. In 1938, with Andre Thirifays and Pierre Vermeylen, he founded the Cinémathèque Royale de Belgique (Royal Belgian Film Archive).

Storck was an actor in two key films of the history of the cinema: Jean Vigo's Zéro de conduite (1933) in the role of the priest, and Chantal Akerman's Jeanne Dielman, 23 Quay Commercial, 1080 Brussels (1975) in the role of a customer of the prostitute.

Jacqueline Aubenas wrote about him, in her expository work, It's been going on for 100 years: a history of the francophone cinema of Belgium: "There emerges forcefully the personality of a cineaste who is not a militant in the sense that this term had in the 1930s for Soviet directors who held an ideology, but in the sense of a generous man who will never choose the wrong side and who will be, in ethics as well as in esthetics, in the first line of battle".

In 1959, he was a member of the jury at the 1st Moscow International Film Festival.

== Awards and achievements ==
- Doctor honoris causa of the Vrije Universiteit Brussel (1978) and the Université libre de Bruxelles (1995)
- cofounder with André Thirifays and Pierre Vermeylen, of the Cinémathèque de Belgique (1938)
- André Cavens Award for Best Film for Permeke (1985)
- honorary president of the Association belge des auteurs de films et de télévision (1992)
- founder member of the Association internationale des documentalistes (AID, 1963)
- lecturer at the Institut des arts de diffusion (IAD), Bruxelles (1966–1968)

== Films ==
1927–1928

- Films d'amateur sur Ostende

1929–1930

- Pour vos beaux yeux – 8'
- Images d'Ostende – 12'

1930

- Une pêche au hareng – 15'
- le Service de sauvetage à la côte belge – 18'
- Ostende, reine des plages – 11'
- Les Fêtes du Centenaire – 7'
- Trains de plaisir – 8'
- Films abstraits dessinés sur pellicule
- La Mort de Vénus – 10'
- Suzanne au bain – 10'

1931

- Une idylle à la plage – 35'

1932

- Les Travaux du tunnel sous l'Escaut – 20'
- Histoire du soldat inconnu – 10'
- Sur les bords de la caméra – 10' 1933
- Trois vies et une corde – 33'

1933

- Misère au Borinage – 28' (directed with Joris Ivens, sound since 1963)

1934

- Création d'ulcères artificiels chez le chien – 15'
- La Production sélective du réseau à 70 kVA – 20'

1935

- Électrification de la ligne Bruxelles-Anvers – 20'
- L'Ile de Pâques – 26'
- Le Trois-mâts Mercator – 23'
- Cap au Sud – 25'
- L'Industrie de la tapisserie et du meuble sculpté – 13'
- Le Coton – 13'

1936

- Les Carillons – 13'
- Les Jeux de l'été et de la mer – 14'
- Sur les routes de l'été – 15'
- Regards sur la Belgique ancienne – 20'

1937

- La Belgique nouvelle – 26'
- Un ennemi public – 27'
- Les Maisons de la misère – 30'

1938

- Comme une lettre à la poste – 25'
- La Roue de la fortune – 15'
- Terre de Flandre – 11'
- Vacances – 11'
- Le Patron est mort – 31'
- Pour le droit et la liberté à Courtrai – 13'

1940

- La Foire internationale de Bruxelles – unfinished

1942–1944

- Symphonie paysanne : Le Printemps – 31'
- Symphonie paysanne : l'Été – 23'
- Symphonie paysanne : Noces paysannes – 19'
- Symphonie paysanne : l'Automne – 20'
- Symphonie paysanne : l'Hiver – 22'

1945

- Rencontre d'artistes – 7'

1946

- Le Monde de Paul Delvaux – 11'

1947

- La Joie de revivre – 13'

1948

- Rubens – 65' (directed with Paul Haesaerts)

1949

- Au carrefour de la vie – 28'

1950

- Carnavals – 15'

1951

- Le Banquet des fraudeurs – 90'

1952

- La Fenêtre ouverte – 18'

1953

- Herman Teirlinck – 55'

1954

- Les Belges et la mer – 15'
- Les Portes de la nation – 15'

1953–1954

- Le Tour du monde en bateau-stop – 20'

1955

- Le Trésor d'Ostende – 24'
- Dix reportages sur le Congo belge, l'Argentine et le Brésil

1956

- Décembre, mois des enfants – 21'30"

1957

- Couleur de feu – 45'

1960

- Les Gestes du silence – 15'

1961

- Les Dieux du feu – 12'
- L'Énergie est à vous – 20' (directed with Philippe Arthuys)

1962

- Variations sur le geste – 23'
- Le Bonheur d'être aimé ou Félix Labisse – 14'
- Les Malheurs de la guerre – 11'

1963

- Plastiques

1964

- Matières nouvelles – 17'
- Enquête sociologique en Yougoslavie

1965

- Le Musée vivant – 34'

1970–1971

- Paul Delvaux, ou les femmes défendues – 18' Palme d'Or nominee for short film.
- Fêtes de Belgique : Le Carnaval d'Ostende – 12'30"
- Fêtes de Belgique : Le Mardi gras à Alost – 11'30"
- Fêtes de Belgique : Le Carnaval de Malmedy – 12'30"
- Fêtes de Belgique : Le Théâtre de rues à Malmedy – 11'30"
- Fêtes de Belgique : Les Gilles de Binche – 26'
- Fêtes de Belgique : La Plantation de Meyboom et le théâtre de Toone à Bruxelles – 14'30"
- Fêtes de Belgique : La Procession du Saint-Sang à Bruges, les pénitents de Furnes – 12'45"
- Fêtes de Belgique : Les Blancs Moussîs de Stavelot et la Ducasse de Mons – 13'30"
- Fêtes de Belgique : La Passion du Christ à Lessines et à Ligny
- Fêtes de Belgique : Les Fêtes d'Outremeuse à Liège – 14'30"
- Fêtes de Belgique : Les Chinels de Fosses
- Fêtes de Belgique : Les Grands-més de La Louvière
- Fêtes de Belgique : le Tir des Campes à Liège – 12'

1975

- Fifres et tambours d'entre Sambre et Meuse – 21'
- Les Marcheurs de Sainte Rolande – 17'
- Les Joyeux tromblons – 16'

1978

- Le Chant du peintre – 11'

1985

- Permeke – 90' (directed with Patrick Conrad)

== See also ==
- Les Enfants du Borinage – Lettre à Henri Storck
