= Misère au Borinage =

1933 film

- Directed by: Henri Storck; Joris Ivens
- Written by: Henri Storck; Joris Ivens
- Edited by: Helen van Dongen
- Release date: 1934
- Running time: 36 minutes
- Country: Belgium
- Languages: French, Dutch

Misère au Borinage (French pronunciation: [mizɛʁ o bɔʁinaʒ], lit. 'Poverty in the Borinage' or 'Penury in the Borinage'), also known as Borinage, is a 1934 Belgian documentary film directed by Henri Storck and Joris Ivens. Produced during the Great Depression, the film's theme is intensely socialist, covering the poor living conditions of workers, particularly coal miners, in the Borinage region of Hainaut Province in Belgium. It is considered a classic work of political cinema and has been described as "one of the most important references in the documentary genre".

Misère au Borinage was shot in black and white and is a silent film with intertitles in French and Dutch. It opens with a title card, bearing the slogan: "Crisis in the Capitalist World. Factories are closed down, abandoned. Millions of proletarians are hungry!" and shows footage of the repression of a 1933 strike in Ambridge, Pennsylvania in the United States. The film then shifts to the Borinage, an industrial region in Belgium's Hainaut Province, during and after the general strike of 1932. The majority of the film focuses on the plight of Borinage coal miners who have been evicted from their houses and made unemployed following their participation in the strike. It also shows the poor living conditions of the miners and their families. The film makes the argument that strike action could be justified by the poor conditions in which Belgian workers lived.

The film was made against the context of the Great Depression and premiered in Brussels in March 1934. According to Robert Stallaerts, Storck's work as director of Misère au Borinage justified his status as "father of Walloon cinema" even though he was actually Flemish.

In 2000, a new documentary was made about the Borinage as a tribute to Storck: "Les Enfants du Borinage - Lettre à Henri Storck".

== See also ==
- Belgian general strikes
- Les Enfants du Borinage - Lettre à Henri Storck (2000)
