= National Statistics Institute (Spain) =

Spanish Statistical Office

- Instituto Nacional de Estadística

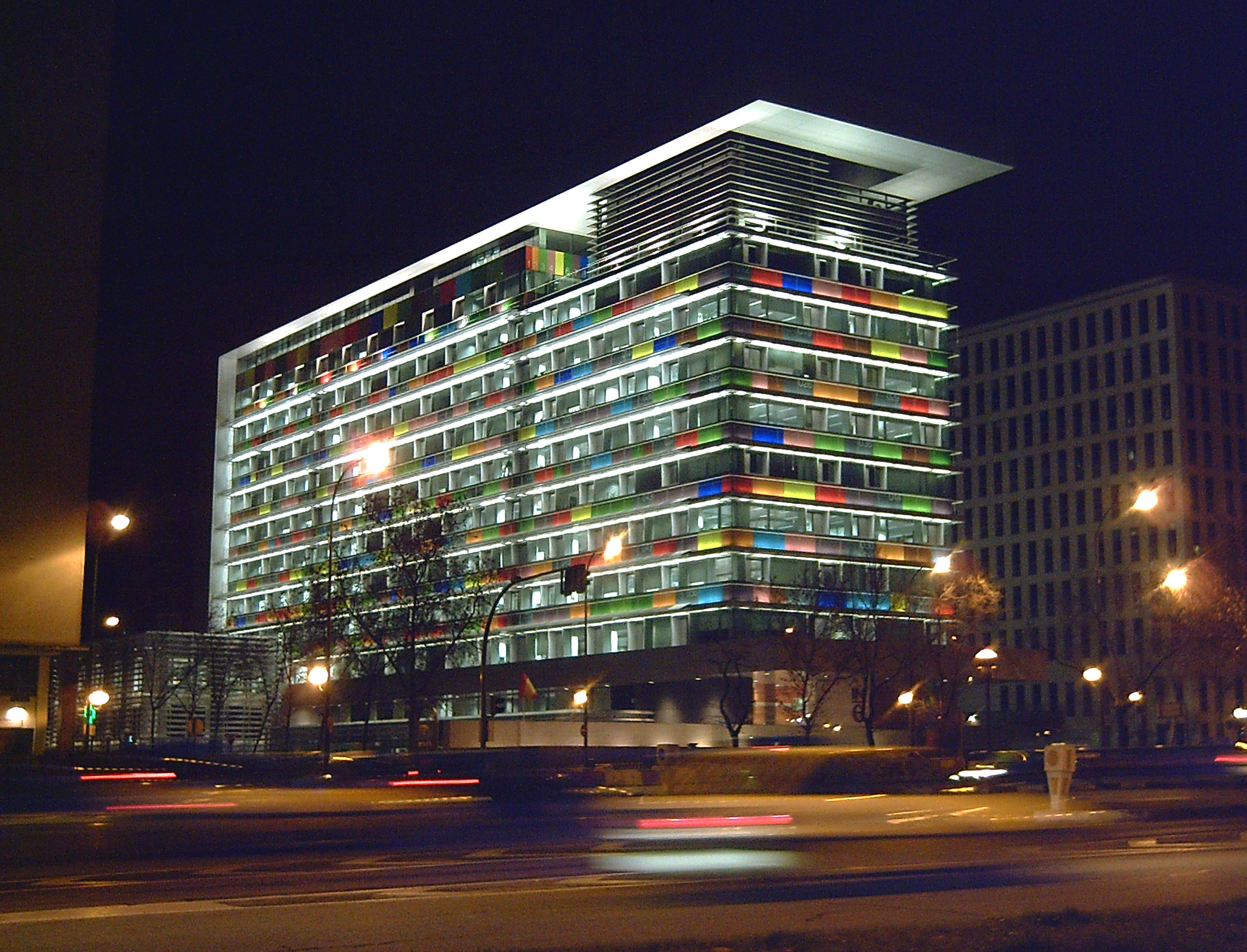
- INE headquarters, Madrid.

Agency overview
- Formed: 3 November 1856 (170 years ago) (as Statistics Commission of the Kingdom); 31 December 1945 (80 years ago) (as National Statistics Institute)
- Preceding agencies: Junta de Estadística; Instituto Geográfico y Estadístico
- Jurisdiction: Government of Spain
- Headquarters: Paseo de la Castellana, 183 Madrid
- Employees: 3,263 (2020)
- Annual budget: € 192.8 million, 2023
- Agency executive: Elena Manzanera, President
- Website: ine.es

The National Statistics Institute (Spanish: Instituto Nacional de Estadística, INE) is the official government agency in Spain that collects statistics about demography, the economy, and Spanish society. It is an autonomous organization responsible for overall coordination of statistical services of the General State Administration in monitoring, control and supervision of technical procedures. Every 10 years, the institute conducts a national census.

== History ==
=== First agency and evolution ===
The oldest statistics agency of Spain and the predecessor of the current agency was the General Statistics Commission of the Kingdom, created on 3 November 1856 during the reign of Isabella II. The so-then prime minister Ramón María Narváez, 1st Duke of Valencia, approved a decree creating this agency within his Office and ordering that people with recognized ability in this matter were part of it.

On 1 May 1861 the Commission changed its name to General Statistics Board and their first work was to do a population census.

By a decree of 12 September 1870, prime minister Francisco Serrano, 1st Duke of la Torre, created the Geographic Institute and in 1873 this Institute changed its name to Geographic and Statistic Institute assuming the competences of the General Statistics Board. In 1890, the titularity of the agency was transferred from the Prime Minister's Office to the Ministry of Development.

Between 1921 and 1939, change its name many times. In the same way, the agency was transferred from one ministry to another, passing through the Deputy Prime Minister's Office, the Ministry of the Presidency, and the Ministry of Labour.

=== National Statistics Institute ===
After the approval of the Law of 31 December 1945, the statistical services were grouped around the new Directorate-General of the National Statistics Institute (INE), with a mission to develop and refine the demographic, economic and social statistics already existing, creating new statistics and coordination with the statistical offices of provincial and municipal areas.

At the end of 1964 the first computer was installed at the INE. It was a first-generation IBM 1401, for which a team was formed consisting of four statistics faculty and ten technicians. In the four years following it was possible that said computer would operate at its full capacity.

The Public Statistics Act of 1989 transformed the Institute into an autonomous agency.

== Organization ==
INE Organization (2025)
| Presidency | Cabinet |
| Presidency | General Secretariat |
| Presidency | Electoral Census Office |
| Presidency | Deputy Directorate-General for International Relations and 2030 Agenda |
| Presidency | Deputy Directorate-General for Training, Analysis and Innovation in Statistical Production |
| Presidency | Deputy Directorate-General for Data Laboratory |
| Directorate-General for Statistical Planning and Procedurement | Deputy Directorate-General for Statistical Coordination and Planning |
| Directorate-General for Statistical Planning and Procedurement | Deputy Directorate-General for Methodology and Sample Design |
| Directorate-General for Statistical Planning and Procedurement | Deputy Directorate-General for Dissemination and Communication |
| Directorate-General for Statistical Planning and Procedurement | Deputy Directorate-General for ICT |
| Directorate-General for Statistical Planning and Procedurement | Deputy Directorate-General for Data Collection |
| Directorate-General for Population Statistics | Deputy Directorate-General for Demographic Statistics |
| Directorate-General for Population Statistics | Deputy Directorate-General for Social Statistics |
| Directorate-General for Population Statistics | Deputy Directorate-General for Labor Market Statistics |
| Directorate-General for Economic Statistics | Deputy Directorate-General for Statistics of Economic Sectors |
| Directorate-General for Economic Statistics | Deputy Directorate-General for Situational Statistics |
| Directorate-General for National Accounts | Deputy Directorate-General for National Accounts |
| Directorate-General for National Accounts | Deputy Directorate-General for Quarterly Accounts |
| Directorate-General for National Accounts | Division for New Developments |

== Headquarters ==
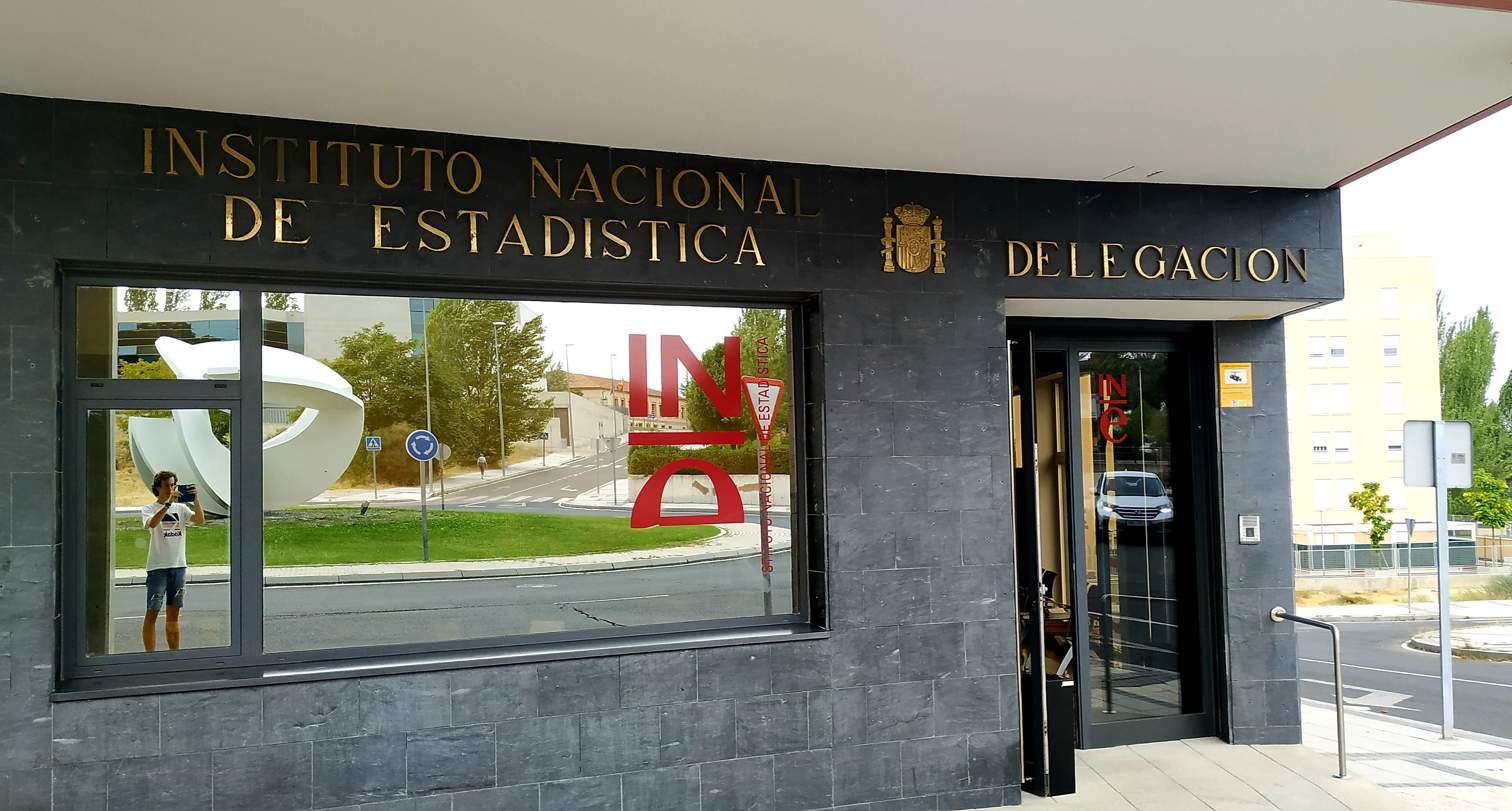
INE Delegation in Segovia

The main headquarters of the INE is located at Paseo de la Castellana no. 183, in Madrid. Although the building was built in 1973, it was thoroughly restored between 2006 and 2008, through a work by the architects César Ruiz-Larrea and Antonio Gómez Gutiérrez, who have completely transformed its original appearance (ocher in color) giving it a colorful appearance, since colored panels with numbers ranging from 001 to 058 have been placed on the façade. This façade is the work of the sculptor José María Cruz Novillo and has been called the Decaphonic Diaphragm of Digits.

It also has delegations and an Electoral Census Office in all provincial capitals.

== Yearbook ==
Spain's Statistical Yearbook (in Spanish, Anuario Estadístico de España) is published annually since 1943. A first edition was released as a one-shot in 1858. It provides information on multiple aspects of Spanish reality, using information available at the time of publication on territory, environment, demography, education, health, economy, agriculture, living conditions, culture, leisure, industry and energy. An international comparison is also included for some of these aspects. All editions since 1858 are accessible online, their content reusable commercially and noncommercially under conditions specified on the website.

== See also ==
- Singular population entity
