= Fever (1981 film) =

1981 Polish film

- Directed by: Agnieszka Holland
- Written by: Andrzej Strug; Krzysztof Teodor Toeplitz
- Starring: Barbara Grabowska
- Cinematography: Jacek Petrycki
- Edited by: Halina Nawrocka
- Release date: February 1981
- Running time: 122 minutes
- Country: Poland
- Language: Polish

Fever (Polish: Gorączka) is a 1981 Polish drama film directed by Agnieszka Holland. It is based on a story of writer Andrzej Strug. It was entered into the 31st Berlin International Film Festival where Barbara Grabowska won the Silver Bear for Best Actress.

The film takes place during the Revolution in the Kingdom of Poland (1905–07). The film was immediately banned by the Polish Communist government upon its release, because of its brutally realistic portrayal of the occupying Russian forces.

== Plot ==
The film is set at the beginning of the 20th century, when Poland fought for its independence.

== Cast ==
- Barbara Grabowska - Kama
- Adam Ferency - Wojtek Kielza
- Bogusław Linda - Gryziak
- Olgierd Łukaszewicz - Leon
- Tomasz Miedzik - Kamil
- Aleksy Awdiejew - Governor's Aide (as Aleksiej Awdiejew)
- Wiktor Grotowicz - Governor's Butler
- Tadeusz Huk - Chemist
- Michal Juszczakiewicz - Michal
- Krzysztof Kiersznowski - Activist
- Marian Lacz - Kielza's Uncle
- Pawel Nowisz - Wartki
- Ryszard Sobolewski - Governor
- Michal Tarkowski - Doctor
- Krzysztof Zaleski - Czarny
