= The Son of Amir Is Dead =

- Directed by: Jean-Jacques Andrien
- Release date: 1975
- Country: Belgium

The Son of Amir Is Dead (French: Le Fils d'Amr est mort) is a 1975 Belgian film directed by Jean-Jacques Andrien. It won the Golden Leopard at the 1975 Locarno International Film Festival.

== Reception ==
The film won the Golden Leopard at the 1975 Locarno International Film Festival. It received the André Cavens Award for Best Film given by the Belgian Film Critics Association (UCC).
