= Flag of the Community of Madrid =

Regional flag in Spain

Community of Madrid
- Proportion: 7:11
- Adopted: December 23, 1983
- Designed by: José María Cruz Novillo

The flag of the Community of Madrid is crimson red, with seven five-pointed stars in white, placed four and three in the centre of the field.

The crimson color stands for Castile as Madrid has been historically Castilian, and the stars represents each of the administrative areas of the province of Madrid, which are the City of Madrid, Alcalá de Henares, Torrelaguna, San Martín de Valdeiglesias, El Escorial, Getafe and Chinchón. The stars are also thought to represent either the Ursa Major (The Plough asterism) or Ursa Minor constellation, in reference to the bear of the City of Madrid's coat of arms.

== See also ==
- Flags of the autonomous communities of Spain
- Coat of arms of the Community of Madrid
