= Little Black Spiders =

- Directed by: Patrice Toye
- Written by: Ina Vandewijer, Patrice Toye
- Produced by: Antonino Lombardo
- Starring: Line Pillet, Charlotte De Bruyne, Dolores Bouckaert
- Cinematography: Richard Van Oosterhout
- Edited by: Damien Keyeux
- Music by: John Parish
- Production companies: Prime Time, Versus Production, Topkapi Films
- Release date: 19 September 2012 (Belgium)
- Running time: 93 minutes
- Country: Belgium
- Language: Dutch

Little Black Spiders is a 2012 Belgian drama film directed by Patrice Toye. The film is set in 1978 and tells the story of a group of teenage girls who are sent to a secluded maternity ward to give birth in secret. The film explores themes of social shame, hidden pregnancies, force adoptions and institutional control.

== Plot ==
In 1978, sixteen-year-old Katja is sent to a secret attic ward in a hospital where pregnant teenage girls are hidden from society. Each girl has her own backstory—some are victims of abuse, others of social prejudice. Under the watch of strict nuns, the girls form close bonds while facing the harsh reality that their babies may be taken from them against their will.

== Based on real events ==
The story of Little Black Spiders was inspired by real-life accounts of young unmarried girls in Belgium who were hidden away in so-called mother houses (moederhuizen) during the 1960s and 1970s. In particular, the film draws on testimonies connected to Tamar in Lommel, a Catholic institution where pregnant teenage girls were isolated from society and often pressured into giving up their children for adoption.

== Cast ==
- Line Pillet as Katja
- Charlotte De Bruyne as Roxanne
- Dolores Bouckaert as Cecilia
- Ineke Nijssen as Sister Simone
- Romy Lauwers as Mia
- Martha Vandermeulen as Sabine
- Marjan De Schutter as Clara
- Nathalie Marie Verbeke as Liesbeth
- Dorien De Clippel as Mireille
- Sam Louwyck as Henrik
- Joren Seldeslachts as Dirk
- Sara De Bosschere as Greet

== Production ==
The film was directed by Patrice Toye and co-written with Ina Vandewijer. It was produced by Prime Time in co-production with Versus Production and Topkapi Films. Principal photography took place in Belgium, including locations in Spa, Belgium, Dunkirk, and Leuven.

== Release ==
Little Black Spiders premiered in Belgium on 19 September 2012 and was the opening film of the Ostend Film Festival. It was also shown at international festivals including the Montreal World Film Festival, the Valladolid International Film Festival (SEMINCI), and the Arras Film Festival.

== Reception ==
Upon its release, critics compared the film's themes and narrative to Peter Mullan's 2002 film The Magdalene Sisters. Barend de Voogd, in a review for Filmkrant, praised Line Pillet's performance but criticized the film's unsurprising narrative and described some of the supporting characters as one-dimensional. Michelle de Silva, writing for The Georgia Straight, wrote that "Audiences who have seen Sophia Coppola’s The Virgin Suicides will notice similar elements: dreamy, out-of-focus shots; muted, pastel tones; religious iconography; and a good soundtrack."

== Awards and nominations ==
- Arras Film Festival 2012 – Best Director (Patrice Toye)
- Vancouver Women in Film Festival 2013 – Best Feature Film, Best Directing, Best Screenwriting
- Ensor Awards 2013 – Nomination: Best Director, Best Actress, Best Screenplay

== See also ==
- Cinema of Belgium
