= Coat of arms of the Community of Madrid =

Versions
- Emblem (Simplified version)
- Adopted: 1983
- Crest: Spanish Royal Crown
- Shield: two castles with turrets and keep, gate and windows azure, masonry sable, overhead seven silver (or white) stars placed four and three
- Earlier version: see below
- Use: the complex version is only for works in stone, other construction materials or confectionery

The coat of arms of the Community of Madrid was adopted in 1983. The field is crimson red with two yellow or golden castles with seven five-pointed white or silver stars on top, arranged four and three. The crest is the Spanish Royal Crown.

The red field symbolizes historic Castile, of which Madrid had long been part, and the two castles represent the two Castilian communities and Madrid as their union. The seven stars come from the coat of arms of the capital representing the constellation Ursa Major, which is visible from the city. The five points of the stars refer to the five provinces which about the Community. The royal crown symbolizes Madrid as the royal seat.

== Coats of arms of the Province of Madrid ==
History of the coat of arms of Madrid Province
Coat of arms	Dates	Details
	1872–1873; 1874 – c.1920	The first version of Madrid Province quarterings and a central inescutcheon were standing for: 1 Alcalá de Henares 'ancient' (a triple-towered castle over waves); 2 Navalcarnero 'ancient' (an aqueduct); 3 Colmenar Viejo 'ancient' (arms based on the heraldry of the Santillana-Vega-Luna family); 4 Chinchón 'ancient'; 5 San Martin de Valdeiglesias 'ancient' (Saint Martin and the beggar); 6 Getafe 'ancient' (An orb); 7 Torrelaguna (a tower over waves); 8 (inescutcheon) Madrid 'ancient' or 'proper'.
	1873–1874	During the First Republic, the heraldic open royal crown was replaced by a mural crown.
	c.1920–1931	Later, reigning King Alfonso XIII, in the third quarter were added the 'ancient' arms of San Lorenzo de El Escorial (Habsbourg, Austria and Lorraine). In the inescutcheon were also introduced the griffin and the civic crown that had been included in the arms of Madrid City in 1859. The 'ancient' open royal crown was replaced by the Spanish Royal Crown. An example of this achievement can still seen today on the front facade of Las Ventas Bullring.
	1931–1939	During the Second Republic, the Spanish Royal Crown was replaced by a mural crown and the coronets of the heraldic lions of San Lorenzo de El Escorial and Chinchón were also removed.
	1939–1968	In the Francoist period, the coronets of the heraldic lions were restored, a female bust was introduced over the aqueduct of Navalcarnero and the mural crown was replaced by the heraldic open royal crown as was displayed with the monarchy from 1872 to c.1920.
	1968–1977	Madrid's provincial division was later rearranged into only five judicial districts, and a new coat of arms was considered, with five quarterings and a central inescutcheon standing for: 1 Alcalá de Henares (a triple-towered castle over waves); 2 Navalcarnero 'modern' (an aqueduct); 3 San Lorenzo de El Escorial 'modern' (per pale a grill and per fess Austria and France modern); 4 Colmenar Viejo 'modern' (arms based on the heraldry of Santillana-Vega-Luna family); 5 Aranjuez (1st division: the Cross of St James, 2nd division: a palace over waves); 6 (inescutcheon) Madrid 'ancient' (in fact, modern because in 1967 the griffin and the civic crown were removed) and the five-pointed stars became six-pointed according to the 1939 version of the city arms.
	1977–1983	In 1977, after King Juan Carlos's accession to the throne, the heraldic open crown used by Franco's regime was replaced by the Spanish Royal Crown and the traditional Iberian escutcheon shape was introduced.

== See also ==
- Coat of arms of Madrid (City)
- Flag of the Community of Madrid
