= Patrice Toye =

Belgian film director

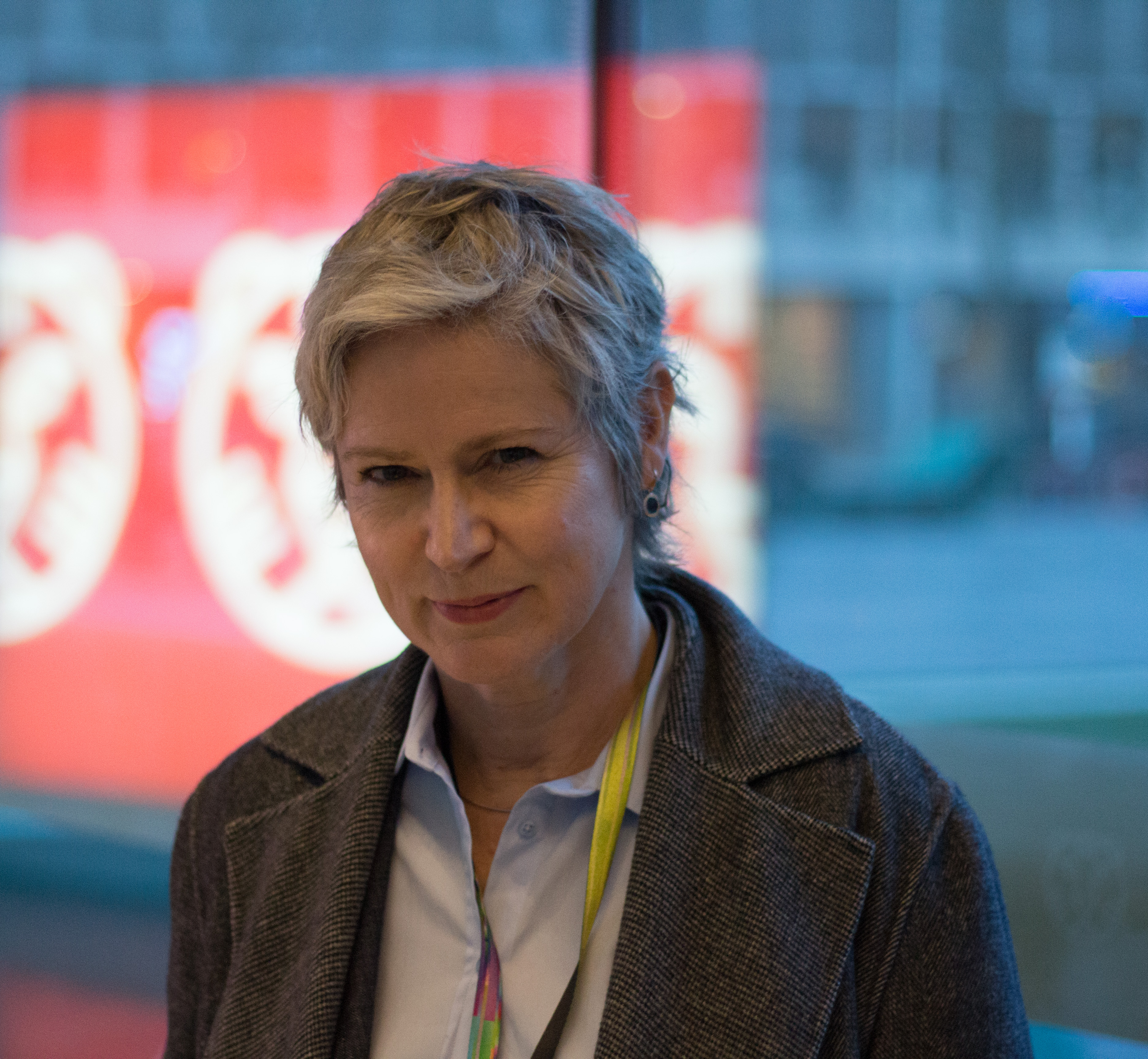
- Born: 1967 (age 58–59); Ghent, Flanders, Belgium
- Occupation: Film director

Patrice Toye (born Ghent, 1967) is a Belgian film director. Her 1998 film Rosie was selected as the Belgian entry for the Best Foreign Language Film at the 71st Academy Awards, but was not nominated.

== Filmography ==
=== Short films ===
- Vrouwen willen trouwen (1992)

=== Feature films ===
- Rosie (1998)
- Nowhere Man (2008)
- Little Black Spiders (2012)
- Tench (2019)
