= Jean-Jacques Andrien =

Belgian film director (born 1944)

- Born: 1 June 1944 (age 81); Verviers (Wallonia)
- Occupation: Film director
- Years active: 1972–present

Jean-Jacques Andrien (born 1 June 1944) is a Belgian film director. Le Monde deem his film Le Grand Paysage d'Alexis Droeven (1981), to be the first great Film of a Walloon cinema This film addresses two problems; the first is that of Belgium's region, site of a bitter conflict between Flemish and Walloon inhabitants, and the second that of dramatic changes that have affected the agricultural world. The film was entered into the 31st Berlin International Film Festival where it won an Honourable Mention.

== Filmography ==
see

- L'babou 1970
- La Pierre qui flotte (1971)
- Le Rouge, le rouge et le rouge (1972) (10 minutes)
- Le Fils d'Amr est mort [The Son of Amir Is Dead] (1975) André Cavens Award; Golden Leopard, 28th Locarno International Film Festival.
- Le Grand Paysage d'Alexis Droeven (1981) (88 minutes) André Cavens Award; Grand Prix du festival d'Aurillac
- Mémoires (1985) (55 minutes] Golden Plaque International Filmfestival Mannheim-Heidelberg
- Australia (1989) (118 minutes) Best Photography Venice Film Festival
