= Patrick Conrad =

Flemish painter, poet, screenwriter and novelist

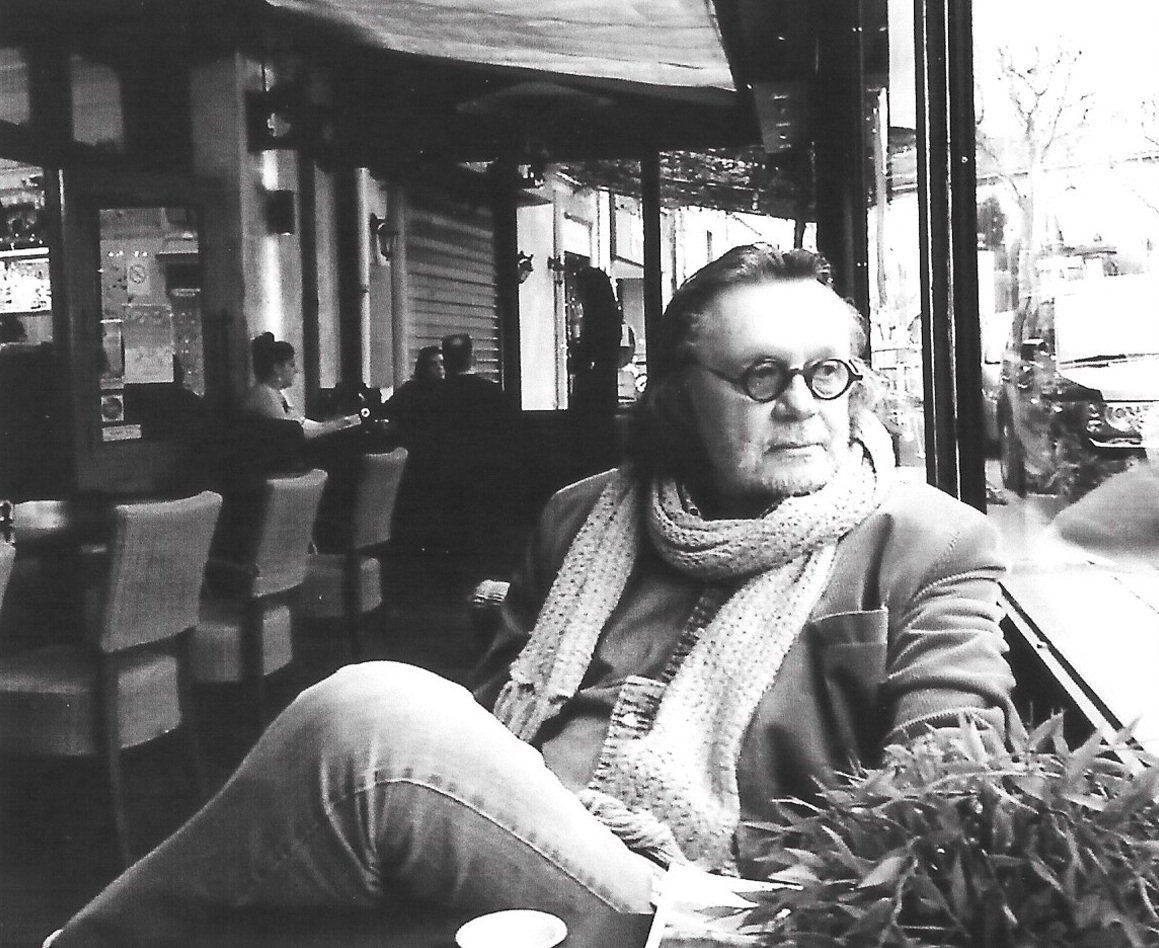
Image of Patrick Conrad

Patrick Conrad (born 16 July 1945 in Antwerp) is a Flemish painter, poet, screenwriter and novelist, and one of the founders of The Pink Poets. He also directed about twenty movies for cinema and television, including – selected for the Cannes Festival - the international cult film Mascara. As a painter and collage artist he showed his work in about 40 solo exhibitions in Belgium and France and three retrospective exhibitions of his work: in 1975 (Museum of Fine Arts of Antwerp), in 2005 (Museum Elzenveld, Antwerp) and in 2022 in the Verbeke Foundation. His work is part of important private collections in France, Belgium, England, Scotland, Germany, Holland, Denmark, Australia and U.S. He lived 34 years in the south of France and moved in 2023 to Porto Alegre, Brasil. In Belgium he is represented by the Paul Verbeke gallery which published several art books about his work.

== Bibliography ==
- Cezar and Jezabel (poems) (1963)
- Ik lig in de dalai-lama (poems) (1964)
- Rose mon chameau (poems) (1965)
- Een pop van Patrick Conrad met Pola Negri in de rol van Eleonora (poems) (1966)
- Mercantile marine engineering (poems) (1967)
- 11 Sad Songs for Edward Kienholz (poems) (1971)
- De kleine dood van Kasper Q. (novel) (1971)
- Allegria! Allegria! (short stories) (1972)
- Continental Hotel of De duisternis der dingen loert (poems) (1975)
- Le déjeuner sur l'herbe (poems) (1975)
- Requiem (poems) (1975)
- Hugues C. Pernath (essay) (1976)
- La mort s'appelle bonsoir (poems) (1977)
- Roxy's Roxane (illustrated script) (1981)
- De vernieling (poems) (1985)
- De tranen van Mary Pickford (poems) (1991)
- Ba! (novel) (1993)
- Limousine (Thriller) (1994)
- Bloemlezing uit de poëzie van Patrick Conrad (book about Conrad by Daan Carstens with a choice of poems) (1995)
- Louisiana (thriller) (1996)
- Annalen (poems) (1998)
- Luwte (thriller) (1998)
- Op de Franse duinen (thriller) (1998)
- Good morning, Hoboken (thriller) (1999)
- Cargo (thriller) (2000)
- Slachtvee (novelization of his movie) (1980)
- De Aap van God (thriller) (2001)
- Starr (thriller) (2006)
- Leven en werk van Marcel Van Acker (Illustrated novel) (2009)
- Getande raadsels (essay about Hugo Claus) (2009)
- Perdida's Droom (Roman Noir) (2010)
- "De Geur van de Maan" (roman noir) (2012)
- "Tango Assasino" (roman noir) (2013)
- "WALKER - De onvoltooide roamance van Ediapaso Gianovoltare" (Roman noir) 2014
- "AS - Verzalmelde gedichten 1963-2014" (complete poems) 2015
- "Moço" (Roman noir) 2015
- "De Cadillac van Mallarmé" (poems) 2016
- "Residentie van Artevelde" (Roman noir) 2016
- "Diep in December" (Roman noir) 2017

Some of Conrads work has been translated in the UK (Random House), the U.S.A. (Viking Press) and Germany (Verlagshaus n°8) In 2012 Starr was published by Bitter Lemon Press under the title NO SALE (Translation Jonathan Lynn);

== Filmography ==
- Les wagons verts-réséda (1967) Director
- Un soir, un train (1968) Actor – Le maître d'hôtel
- Slijk (1972) Director
- Slachtvee (1979) Director/Writer
- Een vrouw tussen hond en wolf (1979) Actor – Fregoli
- Ieder mens die sterft is een museum dat brandt (1982) Director
- Maria Danneels (of het leven dat we droomden) (1982) Actor
- Parlez-moi d'amour (1983) Director
- Na de liefde (1983) Actor – Guido
- L'agenda d'Agenor (1983) Director
- Permeke (1985) Director - Writer
- Mascara (1987) Director - Writer
- Hector (1987) Actor – Filmregisseur
- Het sacrament (1990) Producer

== Awards ==
Literature

- 1969 – Arkprijs van het Vrije Woord
- 1971 – Poetry prize of 'De Vlaamse Gids'
- 1976 – Poetry prize of de Province of Antwerp
- 2008 – Diamant Bullit Award (Best Thriller of the Netherlands and Belgium) for Starr.
- 2015 - Hercule Poirot Award (Best Flemish thriller) for ‘Moço’.

Film

- 1967 Prize of the experimental short movie for Les wagons verts-réséda, Benelux Filmfestival.
- 1985 Prize of the video production for Parlez-moi d'amour, festival of Nyons, Switzerland.
- 1985 Oecumenique Prize for Parlez-moi d'amour, Festival of Nyons, Switzerland.
- 1986 Grand prix for Parlez-moi d'amour, Festival Video Réalité, Brussels.
- 1985 Special Prize of the Jury for Permeke, festival de Nyons, Switzerland.
- 1985 Prize of the Public for Permeke, festival de Nyons, Switzerland.
- 1985 Prix Femina for Permeke.
- 1985 André Cavens Award – Prize for the best Belgian Movie of the year for Permeke.
- 1986 Bert Leysen Prize (Prize for the best Belgian Television Movie 1985/86) for DadaTristesse.

== See also ==
- 1969 : Sinaal prijs voor poëzie.
- Flemish literature

== Sources ==
- Patrick Conrad op Misdaadauteurs
- Patrick Conrad
- Patrick Conrad
- G. J. van Bork en P. J. Verkruijsse, De Nederlandse en Vlaamse auteurs (1985)
- Patrick Conrad at IMDb
