= 31st Berlin International Film Festival =

1981 film festival in West Berlin, Germany

- Festival poster
- Location: West Berlin, Germany
- Founded: 1951
- Awards: Golden Bear (Deprisa, Deprisa)
- Festival date: 13–24 February 1981
- Website: Website

Berlin International Film Festival chronology
- 32nd 30th

The 31st annual Berlin International Film Festival was held from 13 to 24 February 1981. The Golden Bear was awarded to Deprisa, deprisa directed by Carlos Saura.

The retrospective was dedicated to British film producer Michael Balcon, as well a tribute to Turkish film director Yılmaz Güney who was a political prisoner at the time. The guest of the Homage was German film director Peter Pewas.

== Juries ==
The following people were announced as being on the jury for the festival:

=== Main Competition ===
- Jutta Brückner, German director, screenwriter and producer - Jury President
- Denis Héroux, French director and producer
- Astrid Henning-Jensen, Danish director and screenwriter
- Irina Kupchenko, Soviet actress
- Peter Bichsel, Swiss journalist and writer
- Antonio Isasi-Isasmendi, Spanish director, screenwriter, editor and producer
- Chatrichalerm Yukol, Thai director
- Jerzy Płażewski, Polish film critic, writer and film historian
- Italo Zingarelli, Italian producer

== Official Sections ==
=== Main Competition ===
The following films were in competition for the Golden Bear award:

English title	Original title	Director(s)	Production Country
Akaler Shandhaney	আকালের সন্ধানে	Mrinal Sen	India
The Boat Is Full	Das Boot ist voll	Markus Imhoof	Switzerland
Children's Island	Barnens ö	Kay Pollak	Sweden
Come Back Swallow	燕归来	Jinggong Fu	China
Deprisa, deprisa		Carlos Saura	Spain
Der Neger Erwin		Herbert Achternbusch	West Germany
Fever	Gorączka	Agnieszka Holland	Poland
Le Grand Paysage d'Alexis Droeven		Jean-Jacques Andrien	Belgium
Head On		Michael Grant	Canada
History of the World in Three Minutes Flat		Michael Mills	Canada
Il minestrone		Sergio Citti	Italy
The Inventor	Der Erfinder	Kurt Gloor	Switzerland
Köszönöm, megvagyunk		László Lugossy	Hungary
Kudrat	कुदरत	Chetan Anand	India
Luang Ta	หลวงตา	Permphol Cheyaroon	Thailand
Maravillas		Manuel Gutiérrez Aragón	Spain
Milka – A Film About Taboos	Milka – elokuva tabuista	Rauni Mollberg	Finland
On Land, at Sea and in the Air	Ter land, ter zee en in de lucht	Paul Driessen	Netherlands
La provinciale		Claude Goretta	Switzerland
Tribute		Bob Clark	Canada
The Truck	Камионът	Christo Christov	Bulgaria
Twenty Six Days from the Life of Dostoyevsky	Двадцать шесть дней из жизни Достоевского	Aleksandr Zarkhi	Soviet Union
Zigeunerweisen	ツィゴイネルワイゼン	Seijun Suzuki	Japan
Vrijdag		Hugo Claus	Belgium

=== Out of competition ===
- Ordinary People, directed by Robert Redford (United States)
- Raging Bull, directed by Martin Scorsese (United States)

=== Retrospective ===
The following films were shown in the retrospective dedicated to Michael Balcon:

English title	Original title	Director(s)	Production Country
Bulldog Jack		Walter Forde	United Kingdom
Dead of Night		Alberto Cavalcanti, Charles Crichton, Basil Dearden and Robert Hamer	United Kingdom
Foreign Affaires		Tom Walls	United Kingdom
I Was a Spy		Victor Saville	United Kingdom
Sabotage		Alfred Hitchcock	United Kingdom
Secret Agent		Alfred Hitchcock	United Kingdom
The Blue Lamp		Basil Dearden	United Kingdom
The Gaunt Stranger		Walter Forde	United Kingdom
The Man Who Knew Too Much		Alfred Hitchcock	United Kingdom
The Ladykillers		Alexander Mackendrick	United Kingdom
The Lavender Hill Mob		Charles Crichton	United Kingdom
The 39 Steps		Alfred Hitchcock	United Kingdom

The following films were shown in the homage dedicated to Peter Pewas:

English title	Original title	Director(s)	Country
Many Passed By	Viele kamen vorbei	Peter Pewas	West Germany

== Official Awards ==
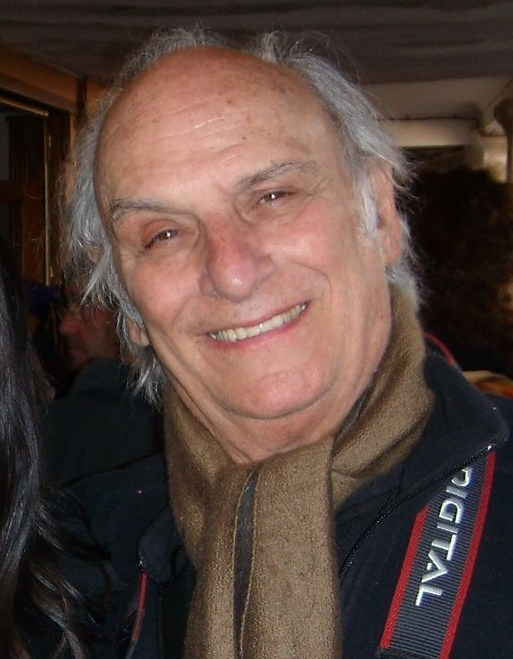
Carlos Saura, winner of the Golden Bear at the event

The following prizes were awarded by the Jury:

- Golden Bear: Deprisa, Deprisa by Carlos Saura
- Silver Bear – Special Jury Prize: Akaler Sandhane by Mrinal Sen
- Silver Bear for Best Actress: Barbara Grabowska for Gorączka
- Silver Bear for Best Actor:
  - Anatoly Solonitsyn for Dvadtsat shest dney iz zhizni Dostoevskogo
  - Jack Lemmon for Tribute
- Silver Bear for an outstanding single achievement: Markus Imhoof for Das Boot ist voll
- Honourable Mention:
  - Le Grand Paysage d'Alexis Droeven
  - Tsigoineruwaizen
