= Evelyne Axell =

Belgian painter (1935–1972)

- Born: 16 August 1935; Namur, Belgium
- Died: 10 September 1972 (aged 37) near Ghent, Belgium
- Known for: Painting, happenings
- Movement: Pop art

Evelyne Axell (16 August 1935 – 10 September 1972) was a Belgian Pop painter. She is best known for her psychedelic, erotic paintings of female nudes and self-portraits on plexiglass that blend the hedonistic and Pop impulses of the 1960s. Elements of the 1960s—the Vietnam War, the Black Panthers movement, and the sexual liberation of women affected her work.

== Early years ==
Born on 16 August 1935 in Namur, Belgium, Evelyne Axell (née Devaux) was born into a traditional, middle-class Catholic family. Her father, André Devaux, was a well known craftsman in silverware and jewelry in the region and her mother, Mariette Godu, came from a very modest family. At the age of two she was declared "The Province of Namur's most beautiful baby"; her beauty continued to be a defining feature of her adult life. Although the family home and shop in Namur were destroyed by a Royal Air Force bomb in 1940, the young Axell was little affected by World War II. After graduating high school, she studied pottery at the Namur School of Art in 1953. In 1954, she switched to drama school and quickly began a career as an actress.

In 1956, she married Belgian film director Jean Antoine, who specialized in art documentaries for Belgian television. She decided to change her name to Evelyne Axell for the purposes of her acting career, which her husband encouraged. He cast her as an interviewer in Jeunes Artistes de Namur (1957) in which she introduced young avant-garde Belgian painters. After Antoine and Axell's son Philippe was born, Axell worked as a television announcer. Although she gained a fair amount of local celebrity, she found the job trivial. In 1959, she moved to Paris to pursue a more serious acting career. There she performed in a variety of theatrical and televised plays. Eventually she moved back to Belgium to star in several movies, including three directed by her husband (Jardins français, La Nouvelle Eurydice, and Comacina) and one directed by André Cavens (A Train Leaves in Every Hour (Il y a un train toutes les heures)). In 1963, she wrote and starred in the provocative film Le Crocodile en peluche, also directed by her husband. Although the film won first prize at the Alexandria International Film Festival, it would be the last film project Axell and Antoine worked on together.

== Artistic career ==
In 1964, Axell quit her promising acting career to pursue painting. She enlisted Surrealist painter René Magritte, a family friend of Antoine's, to be her artistic mentor. Axell visited with Magritte twice a month for a whole year, during which time he helped her improve her oil painting technique. At the same time, Antoine embarked on a series of documentaries devoted to Pop Art and Nouveau Realisme. Axell went with Antoine to London for filming and met Allen Jones, Peter Phillips, Pauline Boty, Peter Blake, Patrick Caulfield, and Joe Tilson. Inspired by these studio visits, Axell created her own style of Pop art, becoming one of the first Belgian artists to experiment within this avant-garde idiom. Although Belgian collectors were interested in her work, private galleries were resistant to showing her paintings. At this time she started to use the androgynous name "Axell" professionally, in the hopes that she would be taken seriously as an artist despite her gender, youth, and beauty, not to mention the explicit sexual nature of her work.

In 1966, her Erotomobiles paintings won an honorable mention in the Young Painters Prize. In early 1967, she had her first solo exhibition at the Palais des Beaux-Arts in Brussels. Shortly thereafter, she stopped using oil on canvas and began painting plastic, first clartex and later plexiglas, with auto enamel. This new method became her signature technique, which she showed for the first time at an exhibition at the Galerie Contour in Brussels in the fall of 1967.

In 1969 she won the Young Belgian Painters Prize, no small feat for a female artist at that time. She organized a few illicit happenings as she continued to make increasingly erotic paintings. In 1970 she painted Le Peintre (Autoportrait) [The Painter (Self-Portrait)] said to be the first painting in which a woman painted herself naked and as an artist. Critic Pierre Restany commented, "The Belgian painter Evelyne Axell has joined the company of womanpower's art, with Niki de Saint Phalle from France, Yayoi Kusama from Japan, Marisol from Venezuela - and the list goes on. These women are living their sexual revolution as real women, with all the direct, unsurprising consequences: the other side is taking the initiative."

In 1972 Axell visited her uncle's family in Guatemala, Jean Devaux, the creator of the Guatemala Ballet, where she became enamored with the landscape and vowed to return. She had secured an exhibition in Mexico for 1973, decided to divorce from her husband and move to Central America for a few years where she had found a nice house in Guatemala with the help of the Devaux family. But her life and career were unexpectedly cut short in a tragic car crash outside of Ghent, Belgium. Axell died in the early morning of 10 September 1972. Her final piece, L'herbe folle, shows a woman resting comfortably with her sunglasses by her side and surrounded by a tropical forest.

== Artistic style ==
Axell's first paintings were more classically based on oil. Soon after, Axell evolved a groundbreaking signature technique by using transparent and translucent plastic sheets from which she cut silhouettes of her voluptuous females and self-conscious heroines absorbed in (homo)erotic poses and activities. In 1970, she coined the term, "The Age of Plastic." She enamel painted these contoured-cut sheets, often painting on both back and front surfaces, and mounted them on background panels to create layered, low relief images of the figures imbued with an opalescent, dream-like quality. With their upfront sexual imagery, the use of bright colours and manufactured plastic materials, their intense monochromatic surfaces and canvasses shaped like large sign posts and public tableaux, Axell's paintings owned the immediacy and commonality of Pop.

== Bibliography ==
1. Axell, Evelyne, and Angela Stief. "Evelyne Axell." Power up - Female Pop Art: Evelyne Axell, Sister Corita, Christa Dichgans, Rosalyn Drexler, Jann Haworth, Dorothy Iannone, Kiki Kogelnik, Marisol, Niki De Saint Phalle; Kunsthalle Wien, 5. November 2010 Bis 20. Februar 2011, Phoenix Art. Köln: Dumont, 2010. 51.
2. Ken Johnson, "EVELYNE AXELL. 'Axell’s Paradise: Last Works (1971-72) Before She Vanished.’" New York Times, 12 November 2009.
3. John Yau, ""Axell's Paradise: Last works (1971-1972) before she vanished." The Brooklyn Rail, November 2009.
4. Kalliopi Minioudaki, "Pop's Ladies and Bad Girls: Axell, Pauline Boty and Rosalyn Drexler." Oxford Art Journal 30.3 2007, 402–430.
5. Liesbeth Decan, "Evelyne Axell (1935-1972) A Belgian Surrealist Pop Artist?" in Collective Inventions: Surrealism in Belgium eds. Patricia Allmer and Hilde Van Gelder. Leuven University Press (2007), 155–173.
6. Jean Antoine, "Stages in a Life Cut Short. Biography of Evelyne Axell." in EVELYNE AXELL. Du viol d'Ingres au retour de Tarzan iac editions, 2006.
7. Liesbeth Decan, [Review of] Evelyne Axell. From Pop Art to Paradise, Image [&] Narrative, Issue 13, November 2005.
8. Sarah Wilson, "AXELL: One + One" in Evelyne Axell. From Pop Art to Paradise/Le Pop Art jusqu'au Paradis, exh. cat., Namur, Musee Felicien-Rops, Namur, Maison de la Culture de la province de Namur, and Jambes: Galerie Detour (2004), 23–40.
9. Evelyne Axell, 1935-1972 : L'Amazone du Pop Art. Renaissance du livre (2000).
10. Evelyne Axell - Méthodes Pop. Paris : Skira, 2019, Isabelle de Longrée, Flavia Frigeri, Angela Stief, Sue Tate, Philippe Axell, Claas Hulshoff. 136 pages, 23,6 x 24,1 cm, ISBN 9782370741226

== Exhibitions ==
=== Solo ===
- 1967

"Axell", Palais des Beaux-Arts, Brussels
"Evelyne Axell", Galerie Contour, Brussels

- 1969

"Axell", Galerie Estro Armonico, Brussels
"Axell", Galerie Richard Foncke, Ghent, Belgium
"Axell, Pierre et les Opalines", Galerie Daniel Templon, Paris

- 1971

"Axell", Palais des Beaux-Arts, Brussels
"Evelyne Axell", Galerie Flat 5, Bruges

- 1972

Cutureel Centrum, Arnhem, The Netherlands
"Axell", Galerie Contour, Brussels

- 1978

"Evelyne Axell", Palais des Beaux-Arts, Brussels

- 1980

"Axell. Derniers dessins". Galerie Jacqueline Ledoux, Namur

- 1997

"Evelyne Axell et les années 60. Un frisson de la vie (Het ruisen van het leven)", Musée des Beaux-Arts d’Ixelles, Brussels

- 1999

"Evenlyne Axell en de jaren zestig", Provinciaal Museum voor Moderne Kunst, Ostende

- 2000

"Evelyne Axell, 1935-1972. L’amazone du Pop Art", Centre Wallonie-Bruxelles, Paris
"Evelyne Axell, Mémoire de Bacchante", Iselp, Brussels

- 2003

"Evelyne Axell 1935-1972, Erotomobiles", The Mayor Gallery, London

- 2004

"Axell. Le Pop Art jusqu’au Paradis", Maison de la Culture de la province de Namur, Musée Provincial Félicien-Rops, Namur, Galerie Détour, Jambes, Belgium

- 2005

"Evelyne Axell", The Mayor Gallery, London

- 2006

"Evelyne Axell, Die belgische Amazone der Pop Art", Fernsehturm and Belgian Embassy, Berlin
" Evelyne Axell, Du viol d’Ingres au retour de Tarzan", Musée d’art Roger-Quillot, Clermont-Ferrand
"The Sixties seen by Evelyne Axell", Patrick Derom Gallery, Brussels

- 2008

"Axell (1965 – 1972) Entre Pop Art et Figuration Narrative", Galerie Natalie Seroussi, Paris

- 2009

"Evelyne Axell, le Pop Art en Wallonie", Centre Wallon d’Art Contemporain, Flémalle
"Axell’s Paradise, Last works (1971-72) before she vanished", Broadway 1602 Gallery, New York

- 2010

"Evelyne Axell, Images contestataires", WIELS, Brussels

- 2011

"La Terre est ronde", Kunstverein, Hamburg
"Axelleration" (retrospective exhibition), Museum Abteiberg, Monchengladbach

- 2012

"The great journey into Space", Broadway 1602 Gallery, New York

=== Group ===
- 1965

"Arts d’Extrème-Occident", Galerie Angle Aigü, Brussels

- 1966

"Jeune peinture belge", Palais des Beaux-Arts, Brussels
"Boîtes à secrets, à surprises", Galerie Maya, Brussels

- 1967

Schwarz galleria d’Arte, Milan
Biennale des Jeunes, Paris
Premio Lissone, Milan

- 1967-68

Galerie Accent, Brussels

- 1968

"Alternative Attuali", L’Aquila

- 1969

"Jeune peinture belge", Palais des Beaux-Arts, Brussels

- 1970

"Images et signes de notre temps", Musées Royaux des Beaux-Arts de Belgique, Brussels
"Pop Art—Nouveau Réalisme—Néo Dada et tendances apparentées", Casino Knokke
"Le plastique et l’art contemporain", Grand Palais, porte de Versailles, Paris
"Belgische Kunst 1960-1970", Kunstverein, Köln
"Multiples", Galerie Rive gauche, Brussels

- 1971

Prix International, Knokke
Winter Art Show, Brussels
Galerie Klang, Köln
Tweede Triënnale, Bruges
Galerie Richard Foncke, Ghent
"D’aprés—Omaggi e dissacrazioni nell’arte contemporanea ", Lugano, Switzerland

- 1972

"La Vénus de Milo ou les dangers de la célébrité", Musée du Louvre, Paris
"De Permeke à nos jours", Palais des Beaux-Arts, Brussels

- 1975

"La Femme dans l’art", Musées royaux des Beaux-Arts de Belgique, Brussels

- 1979

"De jaren '60—Kunst in België", Centre d’expositions Sint-Pietersabdij, Ghent

- 1980

"Vies de femmes 1830-1980", Europalia Belgique, Banque Bruxelles Lambert, Brussels

- 1987

"Femmes artistes en Namurois", Halle al’Chair, Namur

- 1991

"Autoportraits en Belgique depuis 1945", Maison de la Culture de la province de Namur, Namur

- 1992

"ARTificial WOMEN", Galerie Cotthem, Zottegem

- 1999

"De Picasso à Magritte. 40 toiles pour 40 ans de jumelage entre Biarritz et Ixelles", Musée Bellevue, Biarritz

- 2001

"La vie en Pop", Galerie 51, Paris

- 2002

"Portrait en Namurois", Musée provincial des Arts anciens du Namurois, Namur

- 2003

"The 1960s, Painting and Collages", The Mayor Gallery, London

- 2009

"elles@centrepompidou", Centre Pompidou, Paris
"Ingres et les modernes", Musée Ingres, Montauban

- 2010

"Seductive Subversion: Women Pop Artists 1958 – 1968", University of the Arts, Philadelphia
"POWER UP – Female Pop Art", Kunsthalle, Wien

- 2011

"Seductive Subversion: Women Pop Artists 1958 – 1968", Brooklyn Museum, New York
"POWER UP – Female Pop Art", Städtische Galerie, Bietigheim-Bissingen

- 2012

"European Pop Art", Museum Het Valkhof, Nijmegen
"Faces", Palais Royal de Bruxelles, Brussels

- 2013

"Axelle Red, Fashion Victim", Fashion Museum, Hasselt
"GLAM! The performance of Style", Tate Liverpool, Liverpool
"GLAM! The performance of Style", Schirn Kunsthalle, Frankfurt
"GLAM! The performance of Style", LENTOS Kunstmuseum, Linz
"Warhol, Axell, un double regard sur les Sixties", Cornette de Saint Cyr – Bruxelles, Brussels
"Pop Art Design", Barbican Art Gallery, London, UK

- 2014

“Femminilità Radicale“, Museo Gucci, Florence
“Pop to Popism“, Art Gallery of New South Wales, Sidney
"RE: Painted", SMAK, Ghent, Belgium

- 2015

"Noir Chantilly, Féminisme(s)", Centre Wallon d’Art Contemporain, Flémalle
"Le fruit défendu", Galerie du Beffroi, Namur
"The World Goes Pop", Tate Modern, London, UK

"International Pop", Walker Art Center, Minneapolis, USA

"La résistance des images", La Patinoire Royale, Brussels, Belgium

"Pop Art in Belgium", ING Art Center, Brussels, Belgium

"Pop Impact - Women Artists" Maison de la Culture de la Province de Namur, Namur, Belgium

"International Pop", Dallas Museum of Art, Dallas, USA
