= A Train Leaves in Every Hour =

1961 film

- Directed by: André Cavens
- Written by: Georges Lecomte; Théodore Louis
- Produced by: André Cavens; Pierre Levie
- Starring: Evelyne Axell
- Cinematography: Albert Le Berrurier
- Release date: 9 February 1961
- Running time: 110 minutes
- Country: Belgium
- Language: French

A Train Leaves in Every Hour (French: Il y a un train toutes les heures) is a 1961 Belgian drama film directed by André Cavens. It was entered into the 12th Berlin International Film Festival.

== Cast ==
- Evelyne Axell as Isabelle
- Cécile Brandt
- Henri De Bruder
- Nicole Denise
- Irena Fensie
- Stig Gerson as Eric
- Gaston Joostens
- Magda Stevens
- Piero Vitali
