= Belgian Film Critics Association =

Organization of film critics

- Union de la critique de cinéma
- Abbreviation: UCC
- Formation: 1950s
- Type: Film organization
- Headquarters: Brussels, Belgium
- President: Marc Bussens

The Belgian Film Critics Association (French: Union de la critique de cinéma, UCC) is an organization of film critics from publications based in Brussels, Belgium.

== History ==
The Belgian Film Critics Association was founded in the early 1950s in Brussels. Its membership includes film reviewers from daily newspapers, weekly newspapers and magazines from Belgium.

In December of each year, the organization meets to vote on awards for films released in the previous calendar year. To determine the UCC's annual awards, ballots are sent in by the members – select knowledgeable film enthusiasts, academics, filmmakers, and students – and subsequently tabulated in order to decide the winners.

Since 1954, the Belgian Film Critics Association has presented the Grand Prix award to the film of the year "that contributed the most to the enrichment and influence of cinema". Since 1976, the organization has presented the André Cavens Award to the best film of the year produced in Belgium. Its name was chosen in honor of Belgian film director André Cavens (1912–1971).
