= 14th Ensor Awards =

Gala of the Ensors
- Date: 2 March 2024

Highlights
- Best Picture: Wil

The 14th Ensor Awards, presented by the Ensor Academy, took place on 2 March 2024 at the end of the Ostend Film Festival during the Gala of the Ensors in Kursaal Ostend to honor Flemish films of 2023. The awards were hosted by Fatma Taspinar and Xavier Taveirne who handed out awards in 30 categories. The TV series 1985, about the Brabant killers, won 10 Ensors. The best picture winner Wil won 7 awards.

== Winners and nominees ==
=== Awards ===
Winners are listed first, highlighted in boldface, and indicated with a double dagger (‡).

**Best Picture**: **Wil**‡; Here; When It Melts; Holly; Sea Sparkle	**Best Director**: **Tim Mielants – Wil**‡; Sahim Omar Kalifa – Baghdad Messi; Bas Devos – Here; Veerle Baetens – When It Melts; Fien Troch – Holly
**Best Actor in a Leading Role (Film)**: **Stef Aerts – Wil**‡; Annelore Crollet – Wil; Charlotte De Bruyne – When It Melts; Cathalina Geeraerts – Holly; Rosa Marchant – When It Melts	**Best Supporting Actor (Film)**: **Jan Bijvoet – Wil**‡; Ruth Becquart – The Chapel; Robby Cleiren – Holly; Anemone Valcke – Aller/Return; Dirk Roofthooft – Wil
**Best Screenplay (Film)**: **Carl Joos – Wil**‡; Veerle Baetens, Maarten Loix – When It Melts; Bas Devos – Here; Wendy Huyghe, Jean-Claude van Rijckeghem – Sea Sparkle; Fien Troch – Holly	**Best Editing**: **Pieter Smet – 1985**‡; Bert Jacobs – Wil; Nico Leunen – Holly; Helena Overlaet-Michiels – F*** You Very, Very Much s2; Koen Timmerman, Gert Fimmers – Ferry: the series
**Best Documentary Film**: **Planet B – Pieter Van Eecke**‡; Broken View – Hannes Verhoustraete; How Do You Spell Home? – Louisiana Mees-Fongang; Iraq's Invisible Beauty – Sahim Omar Kalifa, Jurgen Buedts; The Pasha, My Mother and I – Nevine Gerits	**Best Short Film**: **Klette – Michael Abay**‡|; The Miracle - Nienke Deutz; As If It Could - Ada Güvenir; Beautiful Men - Nicolas Keppens; Very extraordinary - Sarah van Dale
**Best Sound**: **Arne Winderickx, Matthias Hillegeer – 1985** ‡; Eddy De Cloe, Peter Flamman, Wart Wamsteker – Wil; Wim Frenssen, Bart Vanvoorden – F*** You Very, Very Much s2; Bart Martens, Thomas Vertongen, Benoît Biral, Arne Thomas – Ferry: the series; Geert Vlegels, Pedro Van der Eecken – When It Melts	**Best Music**: **David Martijn, Jeroen Swinnen – 1985**‡; Stijn Cole – Rough Diamonds; Bjorn Eriksson – When It Melts; Geert Hellings – Wil; Johnny Jewel – Holly
**Best Art Direction**: **Stijn Verhoeven – 1985**‡; Kurt Loyens – Arcadia; Kurt Rigolle, Anna Maes – F*** You Very, Very Much s2; Hendrik Van Kets – Rough Diamonds; Bart Van Loo – Wil	**Best Makeup**: **Esther De Goey – Rough Diamonds**‡; Fabienne Adam, Carina Smeekens – 1985; Labhise Allara Mandango Ciratu – Knokke Off; Liesbet Fijalka – F*** You Very, Very Much s2; Kaatje Van Damme – Wil
**Best Costume**: **Sophie Van den Keybus – 1985**‡; Vanessa Evrard – Rough Diamonds; Jutta Smeyers, Sofie Callaerts – Arcadia; Manu Verschueren – When It Meltsing; Charlotte Wilems, Valerie Le Roy – Wil	**Best Cinematography (DOP)**: **Robrecht Heyvaert – Wil**‡; Pieter Van Alphen, Tom Bonroy – Knokke Off; Frank Van den Eeden – Holly; Jordan Vanschel – The Twelve: The Cinderella Murder; Wim Vanswijgenhoven – 1985
**Best Youth Fiction**: **#LikeMe s4**‡; 3Hz s3; Hacked s2; Love Tips to Myself; wtFOCK: ADA	**Best Animation**: **Knor**‡; BIM; Hamsters; Mush-Mush; Titina
**Telenet Audience Award**: **Sea Sparkle**‡	**Box Office Award**: **Wil**‡

=== TV Awards ===
**Best Fiction – Series**: **1985**‡; The Club; The Twelve: The Cinderella Murder; Ferry: The Series; Knokke Off	**Best Director (Fiction Series)**: **Wouter Bouvijn – 1985**‡; Kaat Beels – The Twelve: The Cinderella Murder; Tom Goris – Knokke Off; Bert Scholiers – F*** You Very, Very Much s2; Rotem Shamir, Cecilia Verheyden – Rough Diamonds
**Best Actor in a Leading Role (Tv Series)**: **Aimé Claeys - 1985**‡; Robby Cleiren - Rough Diamonds; Tim Govaerts - 1985; Ini Massez - Rough Diamonds; Pommelien Thijs - Knokke Off	**Best Supporting Actor (TV Series)**: **Tom Vermeir - 1985**‡; Titus De Voogdt - 1985; Anemone Valcke - The Twelve: The Cinderella Murder; Peter Van den Begin - 1985; Marie Vinck - Rough Diamonds
**Best Screenplay (Fiction Series)**: **Wilem Wallyn – 1985**‡; Roel Mondelaers, Nele Meirhaeghe – The Twelve: The Cinderella Murder; Bert Scholiers – F*** You Very, Very Much s2; Leander Verdievel, Sara Theunynck, Zita Theunynck, Hilde Pallen, Astrid Van Keulen – The Club; Luk Wyns, Nele Vandael – Knokke Off	**Best Documentary Series**: **Godforsaken – Ibbe Daniëls, Ingrid Schildermans**‡; Boris; Miracle n°71; Shalom everyone!; Road to Work
