= 13th Magritte Awards =

2024 Belgian film awards ceremony

- Official poster
- Date: 9 March 2024
- Site: Théâtre National; Marais-Jacqmain, Brussels, Belgium
- Hosted by: Patrick Ridremont

Highlights
- Best Film: Love According to Dalva
- Most awards: Love According to Dalva (7)
- Most nominations: Omen (13)

Television coverage
- Network: RTBF

The 13th Magritte Awards ceremony, presented by the Académie André Delvaux, honored the best films of 2023 in Belgium. It took place on 9 March 2024, at the Théâtre National, in the historic site of Marais-Jacqmain, Brussels. During the ceremony, the Académie André Delvaux presented Magritte Awards in 23 categories. The ceremony was televised in Belgium by La Trois. Actor Bouli Lanners presided the ceremony, while director Patrick Ridremont hosted the show for the second time.

The nominees for the 13th Magritte Awards were announced on 9 February 2024. Films with the most nominations were Omen with thirteen, followed by Love According to Dalva and The Experience of Love with nine and eight, respectively. Love According to Dalva won seven awards, including Best Film and Best Director for Emmanuelle Nicot. Other multiple winners were Omen with five and The Experience of Love with two.

== Winners and nominees ==
=== Best Film ===
- Love According to Dalva (Dalva)
  - The Experience of Love (Le Syndrome des amours passées)
  - The Lost Boys (Le Paradis)
  - Omen (Augure)
  - Time Out (Temps mort)

=== Best Director ===
- Emmanuelle Nicot – Love According to Dalva (Dalva)
  - Baloji – Omen (Augure)
  - Zeno Graton – The Lost Boys (Le Paradis)
  - Ann Sirot and Raphaël Balboni – The Experience of Love (Le Syndrome des amours passées)

=== Best Actor ===
- Arieh Worthalter – The Goldman Case (Le Procès Goldman)
  - Bouli Lanners – Paint It Gold (Un coup de maître)
  - Jérémie Renier – Let's Get Lost (Ailleurs si j'y suis)
  - Marc Zinga – Omen (Augure)

=== Best Actress ===
- Lubna Azabal – The Blue Caftan (Le Bleu du caftan)
  - Lucie Debay – The Experience of Love (Le Syndrome des amours passées)
  - Yolande Moreau – The Jolly Forgers (La Fiancée du poète)
  - Mara Taquin – La Petite

=== Best Supporting Actor ===
- Arieh Worthalter – All to Play For (Rien à perdre)
  - Philippe Résimont – Employee of the Month (L'Employée du mois)
  - Jean-Benoît Ugeux – Last Dance
  - Peter Van Den Begin – Employee of the Month (L'Employée du mois)

=== Best Supporting Actress ===
- Sandrine Blancke – Love According to Dalva (Dalva)
- Yves-Marina Gnahoua – Omen (Augure)
  - Myriem Akheddiou – Sixteen (16 Ans)
  - Lucie Debay – Omen (Augure)

=== Most Promising Actor ===
- Lazare Gousseau – The Experience of Love (Le Syndrome des amours passées)
  - Amine Hamidou – The Lost Boys (Le Paradis)
  - N'Landu Lubansu – The Lost Boys (Le Paradis)
  - Yoann Zimmer – Return to Seoul (Retour à Séoul)

=== Most Promising Actress ===
- Zelda Samson – Love According to Dalva (Dalva)
  - Laetitia Mampaka – Employee of the Month (L'Employée du mois)
  - Bérangère McNeese – Let's Get Lost (Ailleurs si j'y suis)
  - Mara Taquin – The Beast in the Jungle (La Bête dans la jungle)

=== Best Screenplay ===
- Love According to Dalva (Dalva) – Emmanuelle Nicot
  - The Experience of Love (Le Syndrome des amours passées) – Ann Sirot and Raphaël Balboni
  - The Lost Boys (Le Paradis) – Zeno Graton
  - Omen (Augure) – Baloji

=== Best First Feature Film ===
- Love According to Dalva (Dalva)
  - The Lost Boys (Le Paradis)
  - Omen (Augure)
  - Time Out (Temps mort)

=== Best Flemish Film ===
- When It Melts (Het smelt)
  - Holly
  - Luka
  - Wil

=== Best Foreign Film in Coproduction ===
- Vincent Must Die (Vincent doit mourir)
  - The Blue Caftan (Le Bleu du caftan)
  - No Dogs or Italians Allowed (Interdit aux chiens et aux Italiens)
  - Return to Seoul (Retour à Séoul)

=== Best Cinematography ===
- Omen (Augure) – Joachim Philippe
  - Love According to Dalva (Dalva) – Caroline Guimbal
  - The Other Laurens (L'Autre Laurens) – Florian Berutti

=== Best Production Design ===
- Omen (Augure) – Eve Martin
  - The Experience of Love (Le Syndrome des amours passées) – Julien Dubourg
  - Love According to Dalva (Dalva) – Catherine Cosme

=== Best Costume Design ===
- Omen (Augure) – Elke Hoste and Baloji
  - The Belgian Wave – Jessica Harkay
  - The Experience of Love (Le Syndrome des amours passées) – Frédérick Denis
  - The Falling Star (L'Étoile filante) – Claire Dubien

=== Best Original Score ===
- Omen (Augure) – Baloji
  - The Line (La Ligne) – Stéphanie Blanchoud, Benjamin Biolay and Jean-François Assy
  - The Other Laurens (L'Autre Laurens) – Thomas Turine

=== Best Sound ===
- Love According to Dalva (Dalva) – Fabrice Osinski, Valérie Le Docte, Aline Gavroy and Olivier Thys
  - Omen (Augure) – Jan Deca, Erik Griekspoor, Danny van Spreuwel and Vincent Nouaille
  - Vincent Must Die (Vincent doit mourir) – Dirk Bombey, Emilie Mauguet, Xavier Thieulin and Bertrand Boudaud

=== Best Editing ===
- The Experience of Love (Le Syndrome des amours passées) – Sophie Vercruysse and Raphaël Balboni
  - I Have Electric Dreams (Tengo sueños eléctricos) – Bertrand Conard
  - Omen (Augure) – Bruno Tracq and Bertrand Conard

=== Best Fiction Short Film ===
- The Silent Ones (Les silencieux) – Basile Vuillemin
  - Beyond the Sea – Hippolyte Leibovici
  - A Good Boy (Un bon garçon) – Paul Vincent de Lestrade
  - Said of a Deer That Sheds Its Antlers (Se dit d'un cerf qui quitte son bois) – Salomé Crickx

=== Best Animated Short Film ===
- Pina – Giuseppe Accardo and Jérémy Depuydt
  - The Marrons Glacés (Les marrons glacés) – Delphine Hermans and Michel Vandam
  - Go Away, Alfred! (Va-t'en, Alfred !) – Célia Tisserant and Arnaud Demuynck
  - Journey in Amnesia (Voyage en amnésie) – Anouk Kilian-Debord

=== Best Documentary Film ===
- Adieu sauvage – Sergio Guataquira Sarmiento
  - Le balai libéré – Coline Grando
  - Se crasher pour exister – Julien Henry
  - An Italian Youth (Une jeunesse italienne) – Mathieu Volpe

=== Best Documentary Short Film ===
- Human, Not Human (En attendant les robots) – Natan Castay
  - Journal d'une solitude sexuelle – Nina Alexandraki
  - Empty Hours (Les heures creuses) – Judith Longuet-Marx
  - On Mothers and Daughters in Times of Injustice – Talia Jawitz

=== Honorary Magritte Award ===
- Aurore Clément

== Films with multiple nominations and awards ==
The following eight films received multiple nominations.

- Thirteen: Omen
- Nine: Love According to Dalva
- Eight: The Experience of Love
- Six: The Lost Boys
- Three: Employee of the Month
- Two: The Blue Caftan, Let's Get Lost, The Other Laurens, Return to Seoul, Time Out, Vincent Must Die

The following four films received multiple awards.

- Seven: Love According to Dalva
- Five: Omen
- Two: The Experience of Love

== See also ==
- 2023 in film
- 49th César Awards
- 29th Lumières Awards
