= 26th Torino Film Festival =

The 26th Torino Film Festival was held 21 – 29 November 2008 in Turin, Italy, directed by Nanni Moretti.

== Films in competition ==
- Bitter & Twisted – Christopher Weekes
- Burn the Bridges (Quemar las Naves) – Francisco Franco-Alba
- Give Me Your Hand – Pascal-Alex Vincent
- Helen – Joe Lawlor, Christine Mollowy
- Momma's Man – Azazel Jacobs
- My Friend from Faro (Mein Freund aus Faro) – Nana Neul
- The New Year Parade – Tom Quinn
- Noise (Entre os Dedos) – Tiago Guedes, Frederico Serra
- Prince of Broadway – Sean Baker
- The Shaft (Dixia De Tiankong) – Zhang Chi
- Tomorrow (Demain) – Maxime Giroux
- Tony Manero – Pablo Larraín
- Unspoken – Fien Troch
- The Wave – Dennis Gansel
- We've Never Been to Venice – Blaz Kutin

== Out of competition ==
- 24 City — Jia Zhangke (China)
- Days of the Turquoise Sky (Kurus) — Woo Ming Jin (Malaysia)
- Dream — Kim Ki-duk (South Korea/Japan)
- The Edge of Love — John Maybury (UK)
- The Escapist — Rupert Wyatt (Ireland/UK)
- Filth and Wisdom — Madonna (UK)
- Gigantic — Matt Aselton (US)
- Highway World: Living, Changing, Growing — Martin Hans Schmitt (Germany)
- Katyń — Andrzej Wajda (Poland)
- Lake Tahoe — Fernando Eimbcke (Mexico)
- Lemon Tree — Eran Riklis (Israel/Germany/France)
- Let the Right One In — Tomas Alfredson (Sweden)
- Mateo Falcone — Éric Vuillard (France)
- New Orleans, Mon Amour — Michael Almereyda (US)
- Night and Day — Hong Sang-soo (South Korea)
- Of Time and the City — Terence Davies (UK)
- Real Time — Randall Cole (Canada)
- Rumba — Dominique Abel, Fiona Gordon (France)
- Shiva (7 Days) — Ronit Elkabetz, Shlomi Elkabetz (France/Israel)
- Somers Town — Shane Meadows (UK)
- W. — Oliver Stone (US)
- Wendy and Lucy — Kelly Reichardt (US)

== The State of Things ==
- Armando e la politica — Chiara Malta (Italy)
- The Baby Formula — Alison Reid (Canada)
- Le Chant des mariées — Karin Albou (France)
- La conquista della vita — Silvano Agosti (Italy)
- Crips and Bloods: Made in America — Stacy Peralta (US)
- Di madre in figlia — Andrea Zambelli (Italy)
- The Exiles — Kent Mackenzie (US)
- The Fire, the Blood, the Stars (Le Feu, le sang, les etoiles) — Caroline Deruas Garrel (France)
- Hunger — Steve McQueen (UK/Ireland)
- Mai 68, La Belle ouvrage — Jean-Luc and Loic Magneron (France)
- The Sun Street Boys — Gyorgy Szomjas (Hungary)
- No Son Invisibles: Maya Women and Microfinance, Featuring Muhammad Yunus — Melissa Eidson (Mexico/US)
- Religulous — Larry Charles (US)
- Sidney Poitier: Un outsider à Hollywood — Catherine Arnaud (France)
- United Red Army — Kōji Wakamatsu (Japan)

== La Zona ==
- Birdsong (El cant dels ocells) — Albert Serra (Spain)
- Extraordinary Stories (Historias extraordinarias) — Mariano Llinas (Argentina)
- Now Showing — Raya Martin (Philippines)
- Nucingen House — Raúl Ruiz (France/Chile)
- Pane/Piazza delle Camelie — Tonino De Bernardi (Italy)
- Parade — Brandon Cahoon (US)
- Still Walking — Hirokazu Kore-Eda (Japan)
- Trilogia: il Pensiero, lo Sguardo, la Parola — Luciano Emmer (Italy)
- Wings of a Butterfly (Le Battement d'ailes d'un papillon) — Aleksandr Balagura (France/Ukraine)
- A Zona — Sandro Aguilar (Portugal)

== Awards ==
- Jury Special Prize:
  - Prince of Broadway - Sean Baker
- Cipputi Award for Best Film:
  - Noise (Entre os Dedos) — Tiago Guedes, Frederico Serra
