= 2022 Cannes Film Festival =

- Official poster of the 75th Cannes Film Festival featuring a homage to The Truman Show (1998)
- Opening film: Final Cut
- Location: Cannes, France
- Founded: 1946
- Awards: Palme d'Or: Triangle of Sadness
- Hosted by: Virginie Efira
- No. of films: 21 (In Competition)
- Festival date: 17–28 May 2022
- Website: festival-cannes.com/en

Cannes Film Festival
- 2023 2021

The 75th annual Cannes Film Festival is a film festival that took place from 17 to 28 May 2022. French actor Vincent Lindon served as jury president for the main competition. French actress Virginie Efira hosted the opening and closing ceremonies.

Swedish filmmaker Ruben Östlund won the Palme d'Or, the festival's top prize, for a second time with the comedy-drama film Triangle of Sadness. The Honorary Palme d'Or was awarded to American actors Forest Whitaker and Tom Cruise, the latter on short notice during the international premiere of Top Gun: Maverick.

The official poster for the festival was designed as a homage to The Truman Show (1998), the film was also selected for the Cinéma de la Plage section.

The festival opened with Final Cut by Michel Hazanavicius. The edition also marked the festival's return to its full spectator capacity after the disruption in its previous two years' editions due to COVID-19 restrictions in France.

== Juries ==
=== Main competition ===
- Vincent Lindon, French actor – Jury President
- Asghar Farhadi, Iranian director, screenwriter and producer
- Rebecca Hall, English actress, producer, director and screenwriter
- Ladj Ly, French director, screenwriter, actor and producer
- Jeff Nichols, American director and screenwriter
- Deepika Padukone, Indian actress
- Noomi Rapace, Swedish actress
- Joachim Trier, Norwegian director and screenwriter
- Jasmine Trinca, Italian actress and director

=== Un Certain Regard ===
- Valeria Golino, Italian actress, director and producer – Jury President
- Benjamin Biolay, French singer, songwriter, actor and producer
- Debra Granik, American director
- Joanna Kulig, Polish actress
- Édgar Ramírez, Venezuelan actor and producer

=== Caméra d'or ===
- Rossy de Palma, Spanish actress – Jury President
- Natasza Chroscicki, French general director of Arri France
- Lucien Jean-Baptiste, French director, screenwriter and actor
- Jean-Claude Larrieu, French cinematographer
- Samuel Le Bihan, French actor
- Olivier Pelisson, French film critic
- Éléonore Weber, French director and author

=== Cinéfondation and Short Films Competition ===
- Yousry Nasrallah, Egyptian director – Jury President
- Monia Chokri, Canadian actress, director and screenwriter
- Félix Moati, French actor, director and screenwriter
- Jean-Claude Raspiengeas, French journalist and literary critic
- Laura Wandel, Belgian director and screenwriter

=== Independent juries ===
Critics' Week

- Kaouther Ben Hania, Tunisian director and screenwriter – Jury President
- Benoît Debie, Belgian cinematographer
- Benedikt Erlingsson, Icelandic director
- Huh Moon-yung, Korean film critic and director of the Busan International Film Festival
- Ariane Labed, French-Greek actress

Queer Palm

- Catherine Corsini, French director and screenwriter – Jury President
- Djanis Bouzyani, French actor, director and screenwriter
- Marilou Duponchel, French journalist
- Stéphane Riethauser, Swiss director
- Paul Struthers, Australian producer

L'Œil d'or

- Agnieszka Holland, Polish director – Jury President
- Pierre Deladonchamps, French actor
- Hicham Falah, Moroccan general director of the Agadir International Documentary Film Festival
- Iryna Tsilyk, Ukrainian director and writer
- Alex Vicente, Spanish film critic

== Official sections ==
=== In Competition ===
The following films were selected to compete for the Palme d'Or:

English Title	Original Title	Director(s)	Production Country
Armageddon Time		James Gray	United States
Boy from Heaven	صبي من الجنة	Tarik Saleh	Sweden, France Finland
Broker	브로커	Hirokazu Kore-eda	South Korea
Brother and Sister	Frère et sœur	Arnaud Desplechin	France
Close		Lukas Dhont	Belgium, Netherlands, France
Crimes of the Future		David Cronenberg	Canada, France, United Kingdom, Greece
Decision to Leave	헤어질 결심	Park Chan-wook	South Korea
The Eight Mountains	Le otto montagne	Charlotte Vandermeersch and Felix van Groeningen	Italy, Belgium, France
EO	Io	Jerzy Skolimowski	Poland, Italy
Forever Young	Les Amandiers	Valeria Bruni Tedeschi	France, Italy
Holy Spider	عنکبوت مقدس	Ali Abbasi	Denmark, Sweden, France, Germany
Leila's Brothers	برادران لیلا	Saeed Roustayi	Iran
Mother and Son	Un petit frère	Léonor Serraille	France
Nostalgia		Mario Martone	Italy, France
Pacifiction	Pacifiction – Tourment sur les îles	Albert Serra	France, Spain, Portugal, Germany
R.M.N.		Cristian Mungiu	Romania, France, Belgium
Showing Up		Kelly Reichardt	United States
Stars at Noon		Claire Denis	France
Tchaikovsky's Wife	Жена Чайковского	Kirill Serebrennikov	Russia, France, Switzerland
Tori and Lokita	Tori et Lokita	Jean-Pierre and Luc Dardenne	Belgium, France
Triangle of Sadness		Ruben Östlund	Sweden, France, United Kingdom, Germany

=== Un Certain Regard ===
The following films were selected to compete in the Un Certain Regard section:

English Title	Original Title	Director(s)	Production Country
All the People I'll Never Be	Retour à Séoul	Davy Chou	Cambodia, France, Belgium, Germany, Qatar
The Blue Caftan	Le Bleu du caftan	Maryam Touzani	Morocco, France, Belgium, Denmark
Burning Days	Kurak Günler	Emin Alper	Turkey, France
Butterfly Vision (CdO)	Бачення метелика	Maksym Nakonechnyi	Croatia, Czech Republic, Sweden, Ukraine
Corsage		Marie Kreutzer	Austria, France, Germany, Luxembourg
Domingo and the Mist	Domingo y la niebla	Ariel Escalante Meza	Costa Rica
Father & Soldier (opening film)	Tirailleurs	Mathieu Vadepied	France, Senegal
Godland	Vanskabte Land	Hlynur Pálmason	Denmark, Iceland, France, Sweden
Harka (CdO)		Lotfy Nathan	Tunisia, France, Luxembourg, Belgium, Germany, United States
Joyland (CdO)	جوائے لینڈ	Saim Sadiq	Pakistan
Mediterranean Fever	حمى البحر المتوسط	Maha Haj	Palestine, Germany, France, Cyprus, Qatar
Metronom (CdO)		Alexandru Belc	Romania, France
More Than Ever	Plus que jamais	Emily Atef	Germany, France, Luxembourg, Norway
Plan 75 (CdO)		Chie Hayakawa	Japan, Philippines, France
Rodeo (CdO)	Rodéo	Lola Quivoron	France
Sick of Myself	Syk Pike	Kristoffer Borgli	Norway, Sweden
The Silent Twins		Agnieszka Smoczyńska	Poland, United Kingdom, United States
The Stranger		Thomas M. Wright	Australia
War Pony (CdO)		Riley Keough and Gina Gammell	United States
The Worst Ones (CdO)	Les Pires	Lise Akoka, Romane Gueret	France

(CdO) indicates film eligible for the Caméra d'Or as a feature directorial debut.

=== Out of Competition ===
The following films were selected to be screened out of competition:

English Title	Original Title	Director(s)	Production Country
Elvis		Baz Luhrmann	Australia, United States
Final Cut (opening film)	Coupez!	Michel Hazanavicius	France
The Innocent	L'Innocent	Louis Garrel	France
Masquerade	Mascarade	Nicolas Bedos	France
November	Novembre	Cédric Jimenez	France
Three Thousand Years of Longing		George Miller	Australia, United States
Top Gun: Maverick		Joseph Kosinski	United States
Midnight screenings
Hunt	헌트	Lee Jung-jae	South Korea
Moonage Daydream		Brett Morgen	Germany, United States
Rebel		Adil El Arbi and Bilall Fallah	Belgium, France, Luxembourg
Smoking Causes Coughing	Fumer fait tousser	Quentin Dupieux	France

=== Cannes Premiere ===
The following films were selected to be screened in the Cannes Premiere section:

English Title	Original Title	Director(s)	Production Country
The Beasts	As bestas	Rodrigo Sorogoyen	Spain, France
Diary of a Fleeting Affair	Chronique d'une liaison passagère	Emmanuel Mouret	France
Dodo		Panos H. Koutras	Greece, France, Belgium
Don Juan		Serge Bozon	France
Exterior Night (Part I and II)	Esterno notte	Marco Bellocchio	Italy, France
Irma Vep (episodes 1 and 2)		Olivier Assayas	United States
The Night of the 12th	La Nuit du 12	Dominik Moll	France, Belgium
Our Brothers	Nos frangins	Rachid Bouchareb	France, Algeria

=== Special Screenings ===
English Title	Original Title	Director(s)	Production Country
All That Breathes		Shaunak Sen	India, United Kingdom, United States
Feminist Riposte (CdO)	Riposte féministe	Marie Perennès and Simon Depardon	France
Jerry Lee Lewis: Trouble in Mind		Ethan Coen	United States
Little Nicholas: Happy as Can Be (CdO)	Le Petit Nicolas: Qu'est-ce qu'on attend pour être heureux?	Amandine Fredon and Benjamin Massoubre	France
Marcel! (CdO)		Jasmine Trinca	Italy, France
Mariupolis 2	Маріуполіс 2	Mantas Kvedaravicius and Hanna Bilobrova	Germany, France, Lithuania, Ukraine
My Imaginary Country	Mi país imaginario	Patricio Guzmán	Chile, France
The Natural History of Destruction	Die Naturgeschichte der Zerstörung	Sergei Loznitsa	Germany, Netherlands, Lithuania
Remains of the Wind	Restos do Vento	Tiago Guedes	Portugal, France
Salam		Mélanie Diam's, Houda Benyamina and Anne Cissé	France
The Vagabonds (CdO)		Doroteya Droumeva	Germany

(CdO) indicates film eligible for the Caméra d'Or as a feature directorial debut.

=== Short Films Competition ===
Out of 3,507 entries, the following films were selected to compete for the Short Film Palme d'Or.

English Title	Original Title	Director(s)	Production Country
A Short Story	破碎太阳之心	Bi Gan	China
Cherries	Uogos	Vytautas Katkus	Lithuania
Fire at the Lake	Le Feu au lac	Pierre Menahem	France
Melancholy of my Mother's Lullabies	Lori	Abinash Bikram Shah	Nepal, Hong Kong
Night Light	Luz Nocturna	Kim Torres	Costa Rica
Persona	각질	Moon Sujin	South Korea
Same Old		Lloyd Lee Choi	United States, Canada
Tsutsuɛ		Amartei Armar	Ghana, France
The Water Murmurs	海边升起一座悬崖	Chen Jianying	China

=== Cinéfondation ===
The Cinéfondation section focuses on films made by students at film schools. The following 16 entries (13 live-action and 3 animated films) were selected out of 1,528 submissions. Four of the films selected represent schools participating in Cinéfondation for the first time.

English Title	Original Title	Director(s)	School
A Conspiracy Man	Il Barbiere complottista	Valerio Ferrara	Centro Sperimentale di Cinematografia, Italy
All of This Belongs to You	Tout ceci vous reviendra	Lilian Fanara	La Fémis, France
Craze	Hajszálrepedés	Bianka Szelestey	Eötvös Loránd University, Hungary
Glorious Revolution		Masha Novikova	London Film School, United Kingdom
Humans Are Dumber When Crammed Up Together	Les Humains sont cons quand ils s'empilent	Laurène Fernandez	CinéFabrique, France
Kinship	Sheherut	Orin Kadoori	Tel Aviv University, Israel
Liquid Bread	Chlieb náš každodenný	Alica Bednáriková	FTF VŠMU, Slovakia
Mistida		Falcão Nhaga	ESTC, Portugal
Mumlife		Ruby Challenger	AFTRS, Australia
Nauha		Pratham Khurana	Whistling Woods International, India
The Pass		Pepi Ginsberg	New York University, United States
The Silent Whistle	Feng Zheng	Li Yingtong	Emerson College, United States
Somewhere	地儿	Li Jiahe	Hebei University of Science and Technology, China
Spring Roll Dream		Mai Vu	NFTS, United Kingdom
That's Amore	100% Flået Kærlighed	Malthe Saxer	Den Danske Filmskole, Denmark
We Are Not There Tomorrow	Jutro Nas Tam Nie Ma	Olga Kłyszewicz	Łódź Film School, Poland

=== Cannes Classics ===
The following films were selected to be screened in Cannes Classics:

English Title	Original Title	Director(s)	Production Country
Restorations
Black God, White Devil (1964)	Deus e o Diabo na Terra do Sol	Glauber Rocha	Brazil
Daisies (1966)	Sedmikrásky	Věra Chytilová	Czechoslovakia
If I Were a Spy (1967)	Si j'étais un espion	Bertrand Blier	France
Itim (1976)		Mike De Leon	Philippines
The Last Waltz (1978)		Martin Scorsese	United States
The Mother and the Whore (1972)	La Maman et la putain	Jean Eustache	France
Pratidwandi (1970)		Satyajit Ray	India
The Red Head (1932)	Poil de Carotte	Julien Duvivier	France
Shoeshine (1946)	Sciuscià	Vittorio De Sica	Italy
Singin' in the Rain (1952)		Gene Kelly, Stanley Donen	United States
Thampu (1978)		G. Aravindan	India
The Trial (1962)		Orson Welles	France, West Germany, Italy
Viva la Muerte (1971)		Fernando Arrabal	France, Tunisia, Morocco, Spain, Portugal, Philippines, Brazil, Italy
Documentaries about Cinema
Gérard Philipe, le dernier hiver du Cid		Patrick Jeudy	France
Hommage d'une fille à son père (CdO)		Fatou Cissé	Mali
Jane Campion, Cinema Woman	Jane Campion, la femme cinéma	Julie Bertuccelli	France
The Last Movie Stars (episodes 3 and 4)		Ethan Hawke	United States
Official Film of the Olympic Games Tokyo 2020 Side A		Naomi Kawase	Japan
L'Ombre de Goya par Jean-Claude Carrière		José Luis Lopez-Linares	France, Spain, Portugal
Patrick Dewaere, My Hero	Patrick Dewaere, mon héros	Alexandre Moix	France
Romy, A Free Woman	Romy femme libre	Lucie Cariès, Clémentine Déroudille	France
Three in the Drift of the Creative Act	Tres en la deriva del acto creativo	Fernando Solanas	Argentina
Visions of Eight		Miloš Forman, Yuri Ozerov, Claude Lelouch, Mai Zetterling, Michael Pfleghar, Kon Ichikawa, Arthur Penn and John Schlesinger	United States, West Germany

(CdO) indicates film eligible for the Caméra d'Or as a feature directorial debut.

=== Cinéma de la plage ===
The following films have been selected to be screened out of competition, in the "Cinéma de la plage" section.

English Title	Original Title	Director(s)	Production Country
The Godfather (1972)		Francis Ford Coppola	United States
E.T. (1982)		Steven Spielberg	United States
The Truman Show (1998)		Peter Weir	United States
Save Our Schools (2022)	La Cour des Miracles	Carine May and Hakim Zouhani	France
This Is Spinal Tap (1984)		Rob Reiner	United States
Brotherhood of the Wolf (2001)	Le Pacte des loups	Christophe Gans	France
East/West (1999)	Est-Ouest	Régis Wargnier	France
A Monkey in Winter (1962)	Un singe en hiver	Henri Verneuil	France
Strictly Ballroom (1992)		Baz Luhrmann	Australia
Fanfan la tulipe (1952)		Christian-Jaque	France
The Last Picture Show (1971)		Peter Bogdanovich	United States

== Parallel sections ==
=== Critics' Week ===
The following films were selected to be screened in the Critics' Week.

English Title	Original Title	Director(s)	Production Country
In Competition
Aftersun		Charlotte Wells	United Kingdom, United States
Alma viva		Cristèle Alves Meira	France, Portugal
Imagine (CdO)	تصور	Ali Behrad	Iran
The Pack	La jauría	Andrés Ramírez Pulido	Colombia, France
Love According to Dalva	Dalva	Emmanuelle Nicot	Belgium, France
Summer Scars	Nos cérémonies	Simon Rieth	France
The Woodcutter Story	Metsurin tarina	Mikko Myllylahti	Finland, Denmark, Netherlands, Germany
Special Screenings
Everybody Loves Jeanne	Tout le monde aime Jeanne	Céline Devaux	France
Next Sohee (closing film)	다음 소희	July Jung	South Korea
Sons of Ramses	Goutte d'or	Clément Cogitore	France
When You Finish Saving the World (opening film) (CdO)		Jesse Eisenberg	United States

(CdO) indicates film eligible for the Caméra d'Or as a feature directorial debut.

=== Directors' Fortnight ===
The following films were selected to be screened in the Directors' Fortnight section:

English Title	Original Title	Director(s)	Production Country
In Competition
1976		Manuela Martelli	Chile, Argentina
Ashkal		Youssef Chebbi	Tunisia
The Dam	السد	Ali Cherri	France, Germany, Serbia, Sudan
Continental Drift (South)	La Dérive des continents (au sud)	Lionel Baier	Switzerland
Enys Men		Mark Jenkin	United Kingdom
De Humani Corporis Fabrica		Lucien Castaing-Taylor and Véréna Paravel	France, Switzerland
Falcon Lake (CdO)		Charlotte Le Bon	Canada, France
The Five Devils	Les Cinq Diables	Léa Mysius	France
Funny Pages		Owen Kline	United States
God's Creatures		Saela Davis and Anna Rose Holmer	Ireland, United Kingdom
The Green Perfume	Le Parfum vert	Nicolas Pariser	France
Harkis	Les Harkis	Philippe Faucon	France
A Male	Un varón	Fabian Hernández	Colombia, France, Germany, Netherlands
The Mountain	La Montagne	Thomas Salvador	France
One Fine Morning	Un beau matin	Mia Hansen-Løve	France
Pamfir	Памфiр	Dmytro Sukholytkyy-Sobchuk	France, Ukraine, Luxembourg
Paris Memories	Revoir Paris	Alice Winocour	France
Scarlet	L'Envol	Pietro Marcello	France, Germany, Italy, Russia
The Super 8 Years	Les Années Super 8	Annie Ernaux and David Ernaux-Briot	France
Under the Fig Trees	تحت الشجرة	Erige Sehiri	Tunisia, France, Switzerland
The Water	El agua	Elena López Riera	France, Spain, Switzerland
Will-o'-the-Wisp	Fogo-Fátuo	João Pedro Rodrigues	Portugal, France
Special Screening
Men		Alex Garland	United Kingdom, United States

(CdO) indicates film eligible for the Caméra d'Or as a feature directorial debut.

== Official awards ==
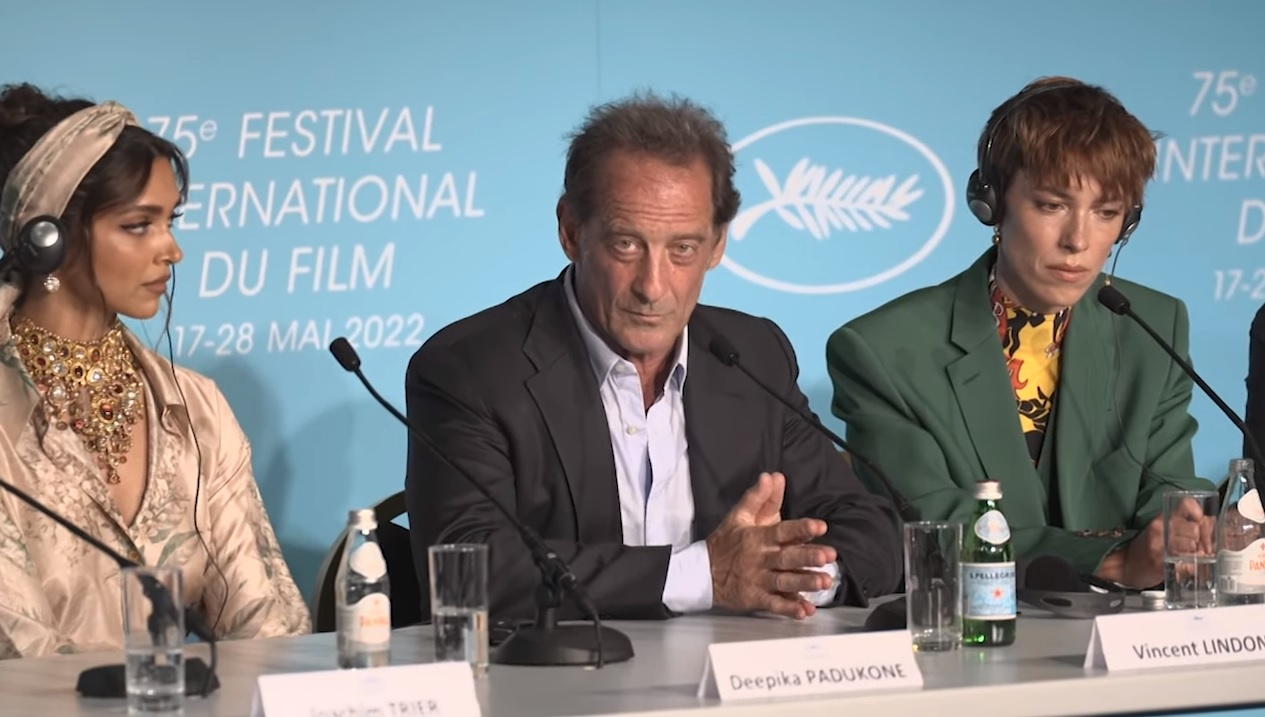
Vincent Lindon, Jury President of the 75th Cannes Film Festival

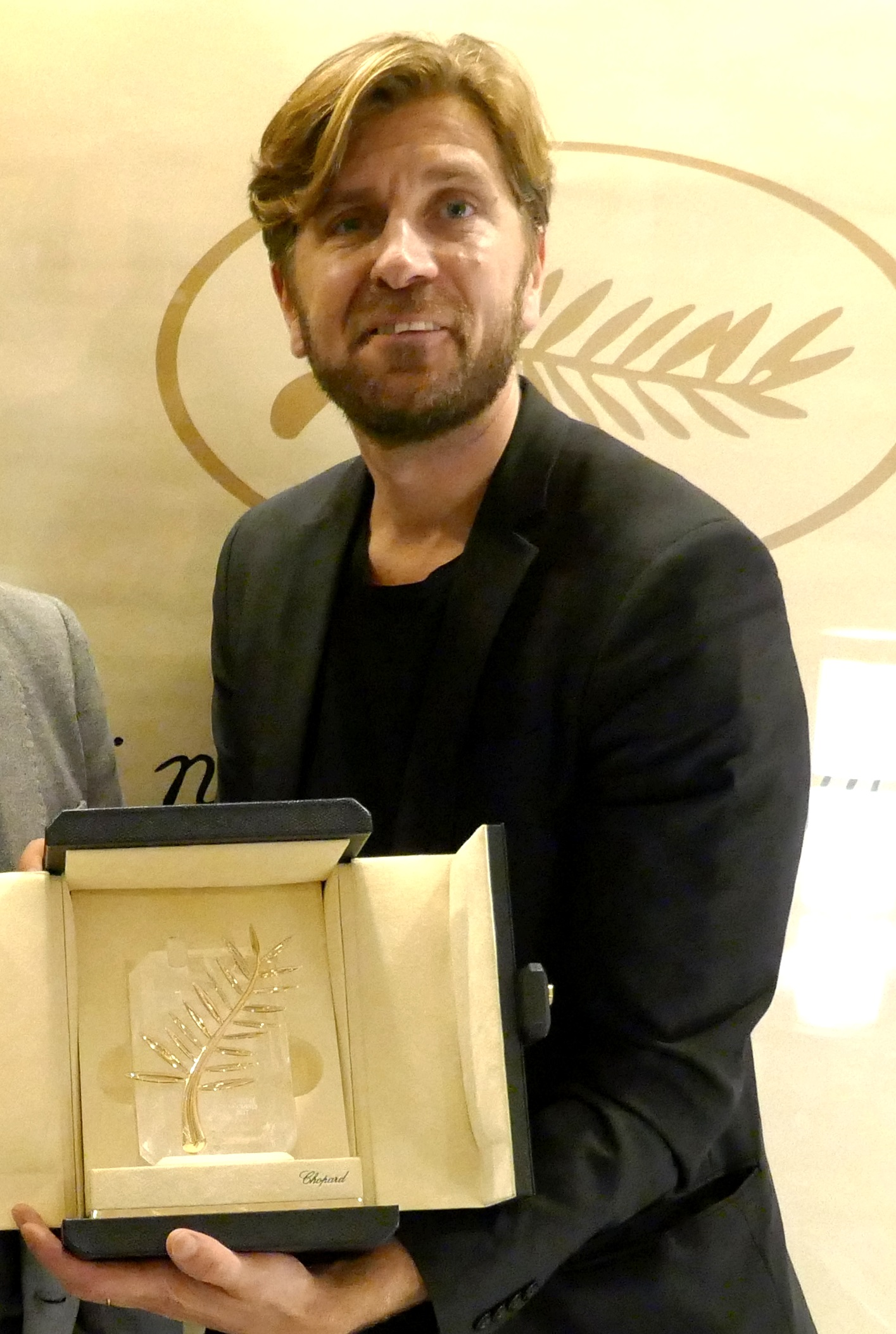
Ruben Ostlund, Palme d'Or winner

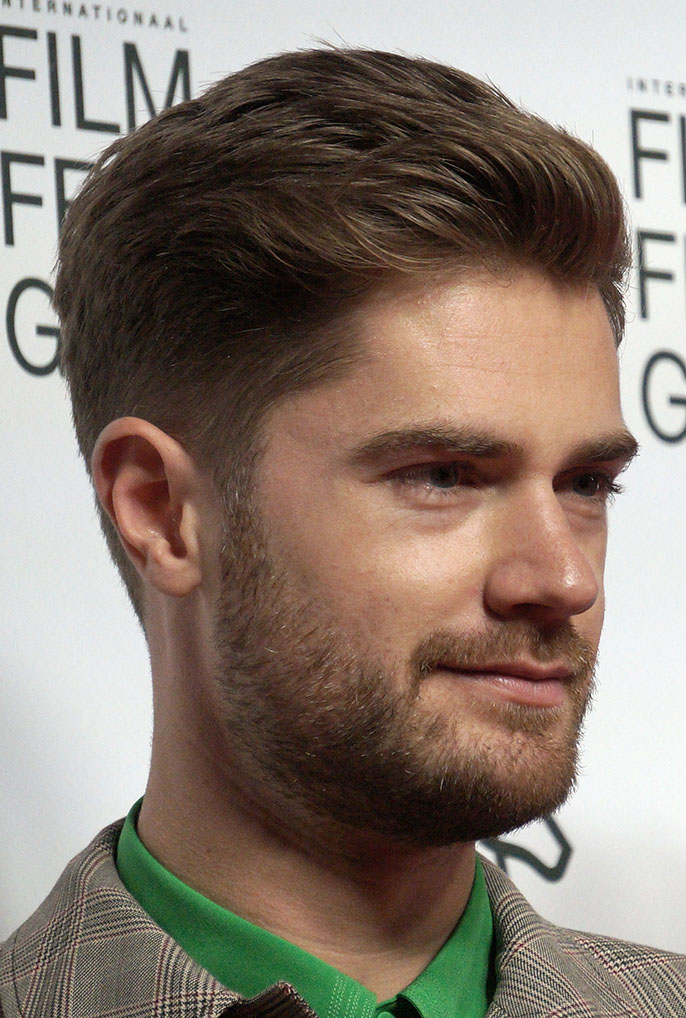
Lukas Dhont, Grand Prix winner

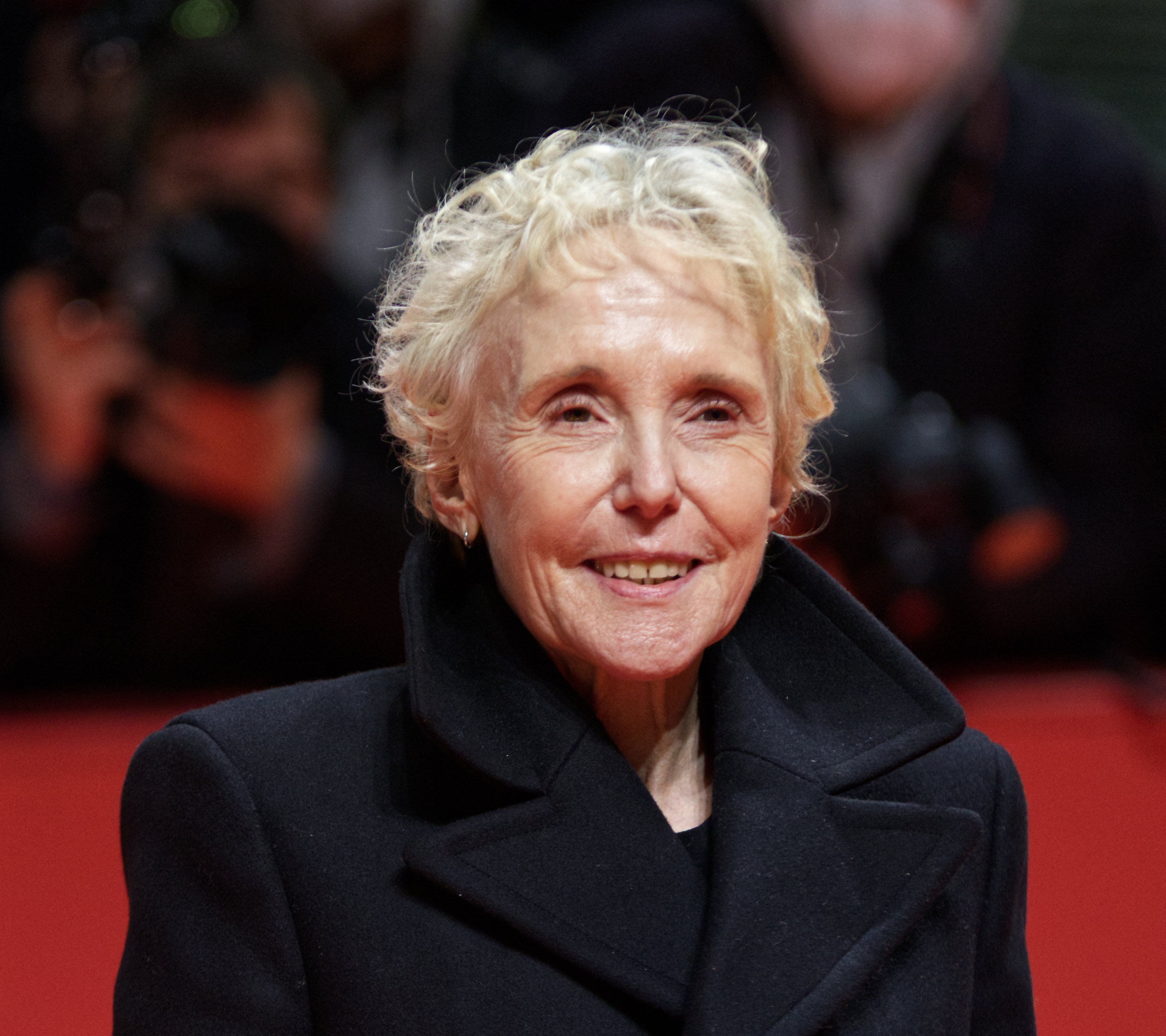
Claire Denis, Grand Prix winner

=== In Competition ===
- Palme d'Or: Triangle of Sadness by Ruben Östlund
- Grand Prix:
  - Close by Lukas Dhont
  - Stars at Noon by Claire Denis
- Best Director: Park Chan-wook for Decision to Leave
- Best Actress: Zar Amir Ebrahimi for Holy Spider
- Best Actor: Song Kang-ho for Broker
- Best Screenplay: Tarik Saleh for Boy from Heaven
- Jury Prize:
  - EO by Jerzy Skolimowski
  - The Eight Mountains by Felix van Groeningen and Charlotte Vandermeersch
- 75th Anniversary Prize: Tori and Lokita by Jean-Pierre and Luc Dardenne

=== Un Certain Regard ===
- Un Certain Regard Award: The Worst Ones by Lise Akoka & Romane Gueret
- Un Certain Regard Jury Prize: Joyland by Saim Sadiq
- Un Certain Regard Best Director: Alexandru Belc for Metronom
- Un Certain Regard Best Performance Prize:
  - Vicky Krieps in Corsage
  - Adam Bessa in Harka
- Un Certain Regard Best Screenplay Prize: Mediterranean Fever by Maha Haj
- Un Certain Regard « Coup de cœur » Prize: Rodeo by Lola Quivoron

=== Short Film Competition ===
- Short Film Palme d'Or: The Water Murmurs by Jianying Chen
  - Special Mention: Lori (Melancholy of my Mother's Lullabies) by Abinash Bikram Shah

=== Cinéfondation ===
- First Prize: A Conspiracy Man by Valerio Ferrara
- Second Prize: Somewhere by Li Jiahe
- Third Prize:
  - Glorious Revolution by Masha Novikova
  - Humans Are Dumber When Crammed up Together by Laurène Fernandez

=== Honorary Palme d'Or ===
- Forest Whitaker
- Tom Cruise

=== Caméra d'Or ===
- War Pony by Riley Keough and Gina Gammell
  - Special Mention: Plan 75 by Chie Hayakawa

== Independent awards ==
=== FIPRESCI Prizes ===
- In Competition: Leila's Brothers by Saeed Roustaee
- Un Certain Regard: The Blue Caftan by Maryam Touzani
- Parallel section (first features): Love According to Dalva by Emmanuelle Nicot (Critics' Week)

=== Prize of the Ecumenical Jury ===
- Broker by Hirokazu Kore-eda

=== Critics' Week ===
- Grand Prize: The Pack by Andrés Ramírez Pulido
- French Touch Prize of the Jury: Aftersun by Charlotte Wells
- Louis Roederer Foundation Rising Star Award: Zelda Samson for Love According To Dalva
- Leitz Cine Discovery Prize for Short Film: Ice Merchants by João Gonzalez
- Gan Foundation Award for Distribution: The Woodcutter Story by Mikko Myllylahti
- SACD Prize: Andrés Ramírez Pulido for The Pack
- Canal+ Award for Short Film: On Xerxes’ Throne by Evi Kalogiropoulou

=== Directors' Fortnight ===
- Europa Cinemas Label Award for Best European Film: One Fine Morning by Mia Hansen-Løve
- SACD Award for Best French-language Film: The Mountain by Thomas Salvador
- Carrosse d'Or: Kelly Reichardt

=== L'Œil d'or ===
- All That Breathes by Shaunak Sen
- Jury's Special Award: Mariupolis 2 by Mantas Kvedaravicius

=== Queer Palm ===
- Joyland by Saim Sadiq
- Best Short Film: Will You Look at Me by Shuli Huang

=== Prix François Chalais ===
- Boy from Heaven by Tarik Saleh

=== Prix de la Citoyenneté ===
- Citizenship Prize: Leila's Brothers by Saeed Roustaee

=== Cannes Soundtrack Award ===
- Paweł Mykietyn for EO

=== Prix des Cinémas Art et Essai ===
- AFCAE Art House Cinema Award: Triangle of Sadness by Ruben Östlund
  - Special Mention: EO by Jerzy Skolimowski

=== Palm Dog ===
- Palm Dog Award: Brit in War Pony
- Grand Jury Prize:
  - Marcel in Marcel!
  - Canine cast in Godland
- Palm DogManitarian Award: Patron (Ukrainian Jack Russell terrier mine sniffer)
- Palm Hound Dog: Titane

=== Trophée Chopard ===
- Sheila Atim
- Jack Lowden

== TikTok Short Film Competition ==
The 2022 Cannes Film Festival also saw the first edition of the TikTok Short Film Competition. It was organised in partnership with social media giant TikTok, and was part of a desire to diversify the audience of the festival. The jury consisted of Oscar-nominated director Rithy Panh, world-famous TikTok creator Khaby Lame, director Camille Ducellier, director-stylist Basma Khalifa and writer-director Angele Diabang. The first Grand Prix Award for Best Film was given to Matej Rimanić, for his film Love In Plane Sight, the second Grand Prix Award was given to Mabuta Motoki, for his film Is it Okay to Chop Down Trees?. The jury also awarded Tim Hamilton with his film Zero Gravity for Best Edit, and Claudia Cochet with her film Modern Princess for Best Script.
