= Emmanuelle Nicot =

French filmmaker (born 1985)

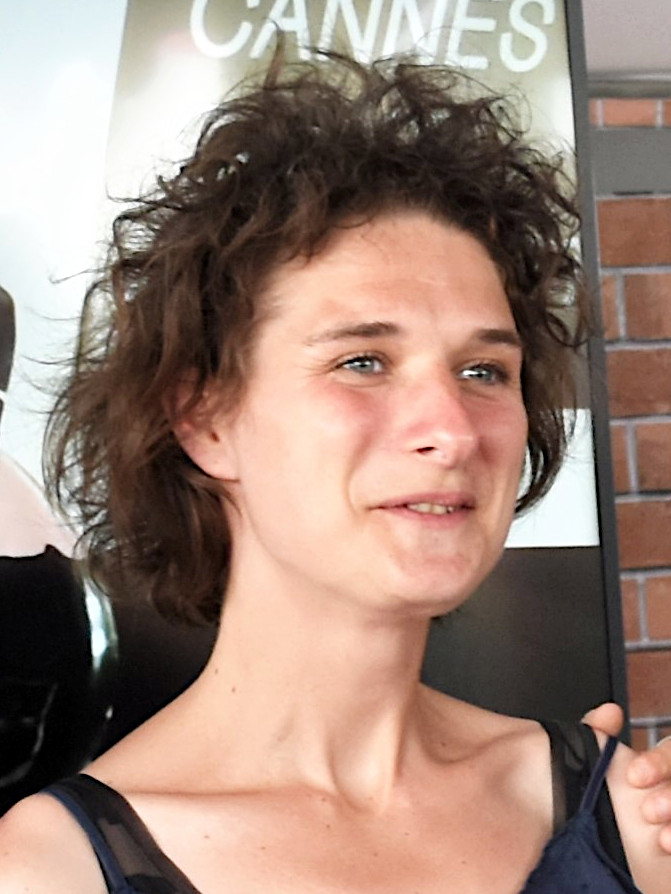
- Nicot in 2022
- Born: 18 November 1985 (age 40); Sedan, France
- Occupations: Film director; screenwriter; casting director
- Years active: 2012–present
- Notable work: Love According to Dalva

Emmanuelle Nicot (born 18 November 1985) is a French film director and screenwriter. She is also a casting director, specialising in the recruitment of non-professional actors.

== Early life ==
Emmanuelle Nicot was born on 18 November 1985 in Sedan, in the Ardennes department. She studied at the Institut des arts de diffusion in Belgium.

== Career ==
Nicot made her film debut in 2012 with her first short film Rae for which she won 15 awards.

In 2016, she presented À l'arraché, a short film which she made after immersing herself in an emergency reception center for adolescents in France. It was presented at more than 60 festivals, winning 17 awards.

In July 2021, she began filming on her feature-length debut Love According to Dalva (2023) in Charleville-Mézières, Reims and Sedan. The film, which tells the story of the rehabilitation of a 12-year-old victim of incest, was selected in the official competition of the Critics' Week section at the 2022 Cannes Film Festival, where it won the FIPRESCI Prize and Rail d'or.

== Filmography ==
Year	Title	Credited as		Notes
Year	Title	Director	Screenwriter	Notes
2012	Rae	Yes	Yes	Short
2016	À l'arraché	Yes	Yes	Short
2022	Love According to Dalva	Yes	Yes	

== Accolades ==
Award	Date of ceremony	Category	Film	Result	Ref.
Belgian Film Critics Association	December 2023	Prix André Cavens	Love According to Dalva	Won	
Brussels Short Film Festival	8 May 2016	Grand prix national	À l'arraché	Won	
Cannes Film Festival	28 May 2022	Critics' Week FIPRESCI Prize	Love According to Dalva	Won	
Cannes Film Festival	28 May 2022	Rail d'or	Love According to Dalva	Won	
Magritte Awards	4 February 2017	Best Fiction Short Film	À l'arraché	Nominated	
Magritte Awards	9 March 2024	Best Film	Love According to Dalva	Won	
Magritte Awards	9 March 2024	Best First Feature Film	Love According to Dalva	Won	
Magritte Awards	9 March 2024	Best Director	Love According to Dalva	Won	
Magritte Awards	9 March 2024	Best Screenplay	Love According to Dalva	Won	
