= Eye Haïdara =

French actress (born 1983)

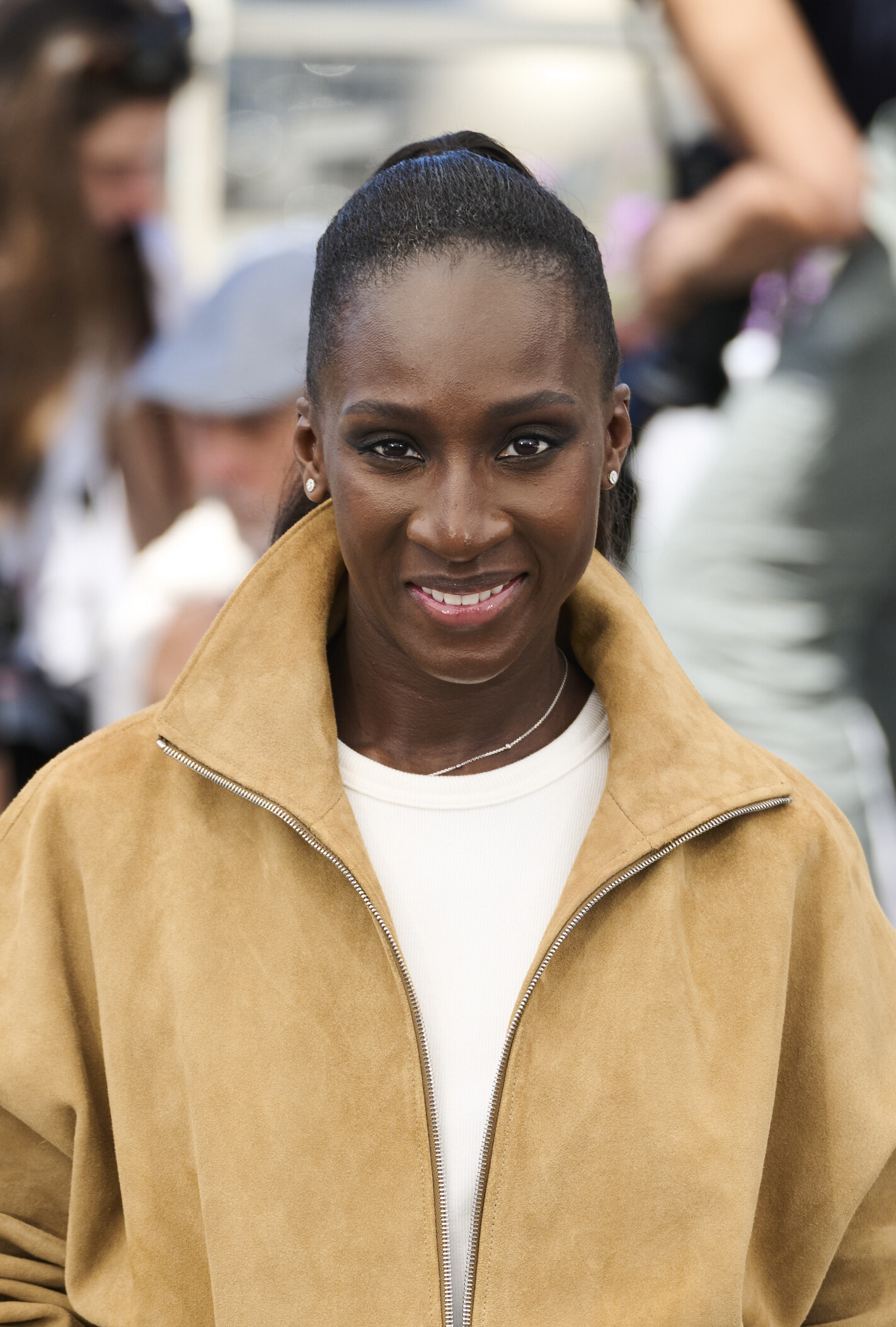
- Haïdara at the 2026 Cannes Film Festival
- Born: 7 March 1983 (age 43); Boulogne-Billancourt, Hauts-de-Seine, France
- Occupation: Actress
- Years active: 2007–present

Eye Haïdara (French: [ej aidaʁa]; born 7 March 1983) is a French-Malian actress.

== Biography ==
Eye Haïdara was born in 1983 to Malian parents (her father also has Moroccan origins) who returned to live in the south of Bamako (Mali). She began acting in theater under the encouragement of her primary school teacher at Boulevard Bessières in the 17th arrondissement of Paris. After a traditional educational path, obtaining a baccalaureate with a theater option from Lycée Racine in Paris in 2001, and then a DEUG in Performing Arts from Université Sorbonne Nouvelle in 2003, she attended acting classes at Acting International under the direction of Robert Cordier.

== Filmography ==
Year	Title	Role	Director	Notes
2007	Regarde-moi	Fatima	Audrey Estrougo	
2010	Film Socialisme	Camerawoman	Jean-Luc Godard	
2011	Jimmy Rivière	Fatim	Teddy Lussi-Modeste	
2011	Mar Vivo	Laetitia	Cyril Brody	Short
2011	Implosion	Djamile	Sören Voigt	TV movie
2015	Les gorilles	Linda	Tristan Aurouet	
2016	Jailbirds	Nato Kanté	Audrey Estrougo	
2016	Opération Commando	Eye	Jan Czarlewski	Short
2016	Caramel Surprise	Mawena	Fairouz M'Silti	Short
2017	C'est la vie !	Adèle	Éric Toledano and Olivier Nakache	Nominated – César Award for Most Promising Actress; Nominated – Lumière Award for Best Female Revelation
2018	Papa ou Maman	Tania	Frédéric Balekdjian	TV series (6 episodes)
2018	Patriot	Detective Nan Ntep	Steven Conrad	TV series (7 episodes)
2019	La lutte des classes	Dounia	Michel Leclerc	Film
2019	Someone, Somewhere (Deux moi)	Djena	Cédric Klapisch	Film
2023	The Lost Boys (Le Paradis)	Sophie	Zeno Graton	Film
2024	Furies	Keïta		TV series
2025	Six Days in Spring	Sana	Joachim Lafosse	San Sebastián 2025
