= Love According to Dalva =

- Theatrical release poster
- French: Dalva
- Directed by: Emmanuelle Nicot
- Written by: Emmanuelle Nicot; Jacques Akchoti (collaboration); Bulle Decarpentries (collaboration)
- Produced by: Julie Esparbes; Delphine Schmit
- Starring: Zelda Samson; Alexis Manenti; Fanta Guirassy
- Cinematography: Caroline Guimbal
- Edited by: Suzana Pedro
- Music by: Frédéric Alvarez
- Production companies: Hélicotronc; Tripode Productions; Arte France Cinéma; RTBF; Proximus; Shelter Prod
- Distributed by: Diaphana Distribution
- Release dates: 20 May 2022 (Cannes); 22 March 2023 (France); 22 March 2023 (Belgium)
- Running time: 83 mins
- Countries: Belgium; France
- Language: French
- Box office: $548,489

Love According to Dalva (French: Dalva) is a 2022 Belgian-French film directed by Emmanuelle Nicot in her feature debut. It follows a 12-year-old girl who is taken away from her sexually abusive father and struggles to adjust to her new life in a foster home.

At the 13th Magritte Awards, Dalva received nine nominations and won seven awards, including Best Film and Best Director for Nicot.

== Cast ==
- Zelda Samson as Dalva
- Alexis Manenti as Jayden
- Fanta Guirassy as Samia
- Marie Denarnaud as Zora
- Jean-Louis Coulloc'h as Jacques
- Sandrine Blancke as Marina, Dalva's mother
- Maïa Sandoz as the psychologist
- Charlie Drach as Lucile
- Roman Coustère-Hachez as Dimi
- Abdelmounim Snoussi as Shérif
- Babetida Sadjo as the lady doctor
- Gilles David as the judge
- Romane Mouyal as Inès

== Production ==
Principal photography, under the working title L'Amour selon Dalva, began on 19 July 2021, with shooting mostly taking place in Charleville-Mézières, Reims and Sedan. Filming also took place in the Bois de la Houssière in Braine-le-Comte, as well as in Brussels and Braine-l'Alleud. continuing until 24 September 2021.

== Reception ==
=== Accolades ===
Award	Date of ceremony	Category	Recipient(s)	Result	Ref.
Magritte Awards	9 March 2024	Best Film	Love According to Dalva	Won	
Magritte Awards	9 March 2024	Best Director	Emmanuelle Nicot	Won	
Magritte Awards	9 March 2024	Best Supporting Actress (Note: Shared with Yves-Marina Gnahoua for Omen.)	Sandrine Blancke	Won	
Magritte Awards	9 March 2024	Most Promising Actress	Zelda Samson	Won	
Magritte Awards	9 March 2024	Best Screenplay	Emmanuelle Nicot	Won	
Magritte Awards	9 March 2024	Best First Feature Film	Love According to Dalva	Won	
Magritte Awards	9 March 2024	Best Sound	Fabrice Osinski, Valérie Le Docte, Aline Gavroy and Olivier Thys	Won	
Magritte Awards	9 March 2024	Best Cinematography	Caroline Guimbal	Nominated	
Magritte Awards	9 March 2024	Best Production Design	Catherine Cosme	Nominated	
