= Unspoken (film) =

- Theatrical release poster
- Directed by: Fien Troch
- Written by: Fien Troch
- Produced by: Antonino Lombardo
- Starring: Emmanuelle Devos; Bruno Todeschini
- Cinematography: Frank van den Eeden
- Edited by: Ludo Troch
- Music by: Peter Van Laerhoven
- Release dates: 5 September 2008 (TIFF); 18 February 2009 (Belgium)
- Running time: 97 minutes
- Country: Belgium
- Language: French
- Box office: $24.138

Unspoken (French: Non-dit) is a 2008 Belgian drama film. It was written and directed by Fien Troch, produced by Antonino Lombardo, and starred Emmanuelle Devos and Bruno Todeschini.

The film tells the story of Grace, who is still grappling with the disappearance of her daughter five years earlier, and her husband Lukas, who is trapped in his own helpless grief. He and Grace have long since stopped communicating. As Grace confronts a series of small absurdities in her apartment building, Lukas finds himself unable to complete even the simplest of daily tasks. When something truly heartbreaking happens in a family, the deepest response is often unspoken.

Unspoken had its world premiere at the 2008 Toronto International Film Festival. It has received high praise from film critics and won various awards from numerous film organizations and festivals. The film was named Best Film of 2009 by the Belgian Film Critics Association (UCC) winning the André Cavens Award. Emmanuelle Devos received Best Female Performance at the 26th Torino Film Festival. The film was also nominated for the Grand Prix at the Flanders International Film Festival Ghent.

== Cast ==
- Emmanuelle Devos : Grace
- Bruno Todeschini : Lucas
- Patrick Descamps : Monsieur Tournier
- Joffrey Verbruggen : Benjamin
