= Someone Else's Happiness =

2005 film

Een ander zijn geluk
- Theatrical release poster
- Directed by: Fien Troch
- Written by: Fien Troch
- Starring: Ina Geerts; Peter Van den Begin; Johan Leysen; Josse De Pauw; Natali Broods
- Cinematography: Frank van den Eeden
- Production companies: Prime Time; Motel Films
- Distributed by: Kinepolis Film Distribution (Belgium); A-Film Distribution (Netherlands)
- Release date: 2005
- Running time: 98 minutes
- Countries: Belgium; Netherlands
- Language: Dutch

Someone Else's Happiness (Dutch: Een ander zijn geluk) is a 2005 Belgian-Dutch film directed and written by Fien Troch. The movie was the Belgian entry for the Academy Awards 2006 in the category Best Foreign Language Film but failed to receive the actual nomination.

== Cast ==
- Ina Geerts as Christine
- Johanna ter Steege as Ann
- Johan Leysen as Francis
- Natali Broods as Gerda
- Peter Van den Begin as Mark
- Josse De Pauw as Inspecteur

== Awards and nominations ==
- Joseph Plateau Awards:
  - Best Belgian Director (Fien Troch, nominated)
  - Best Belgian Film (nominated)
  - Best Belgian Screenplay (Fien Troch, nominated)
- Thessaloniki Film Festival:
  - Best Actress (Ina Geerts, won)
  - Best Screenplay (Fien Troch, won)
  - Golden Alexander (Fien Troch, won)
  - Special Mention (Natali Broods for the acting)

== See also ==
- List of Belgian submissions for Academy Award for Best Foreign Language Film
