= Love In Plane Sight =

TikTok short film

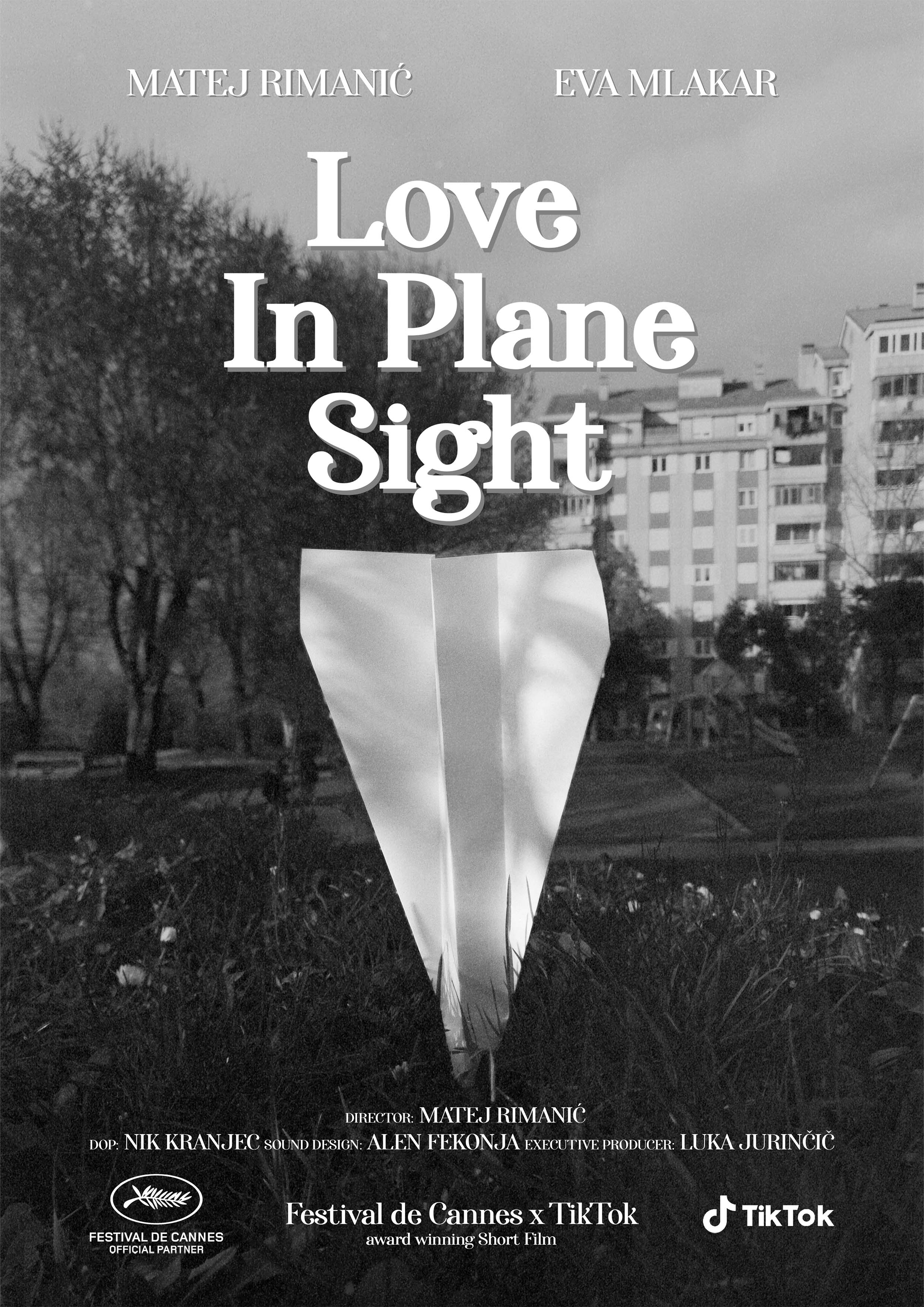
- Film poster
- Directed by: Matej Rimanić
- Screenplay by: Matej Rimanić
- Starring: Matej Rimanić; Eva Mlakar
- Cinematography: Nik Kranjec
- Edited by: Nik Kranjec; Matej Rimanić
- Release date: 7 April 2022
- Running time: 2 minutes 36 seconds
- Country: Slovenia

Love In Plane Sight, a 2022 silent short film, directed by Matej Rimanić and shot by Nik Kranjec, stars Matej Rimanić as Boy and Eva Mlakar as Girl. It won the Grand Prix award for Best Film in the first edition of the TikTok Short Film Competition, at the 2022 Cannes Film Festival.

== Storyline ==
The Boy sees a neighboring Girl and instantly falls in love. He invites her on a date through a paper plane invite, but gets rejected so he uses his charm to get his second chance.

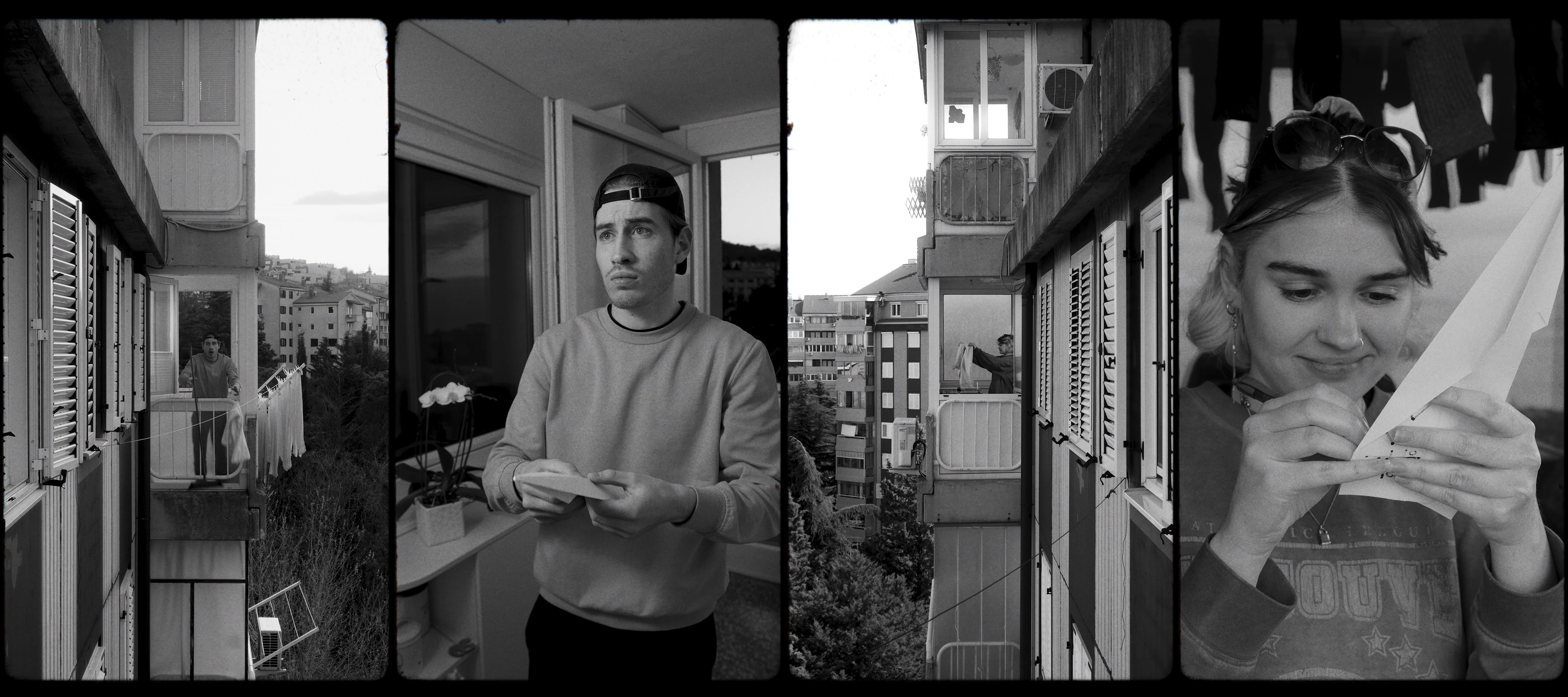
Love In Plane Sight Stills

== TikTok Short Film Competition ==
In 2022, social media giant TikTok organised a short film competition in partnership with the Cannes Film Festival inviting all of its users to create a short film, with a duration from 30 seconds to 3 minutes. 70.000 short films were submitted from 44 different countries amassing a total of 4,5 billion views. Along with the Grand Prix for Best Film, TikTok also awarded Best Editing and Best Script.

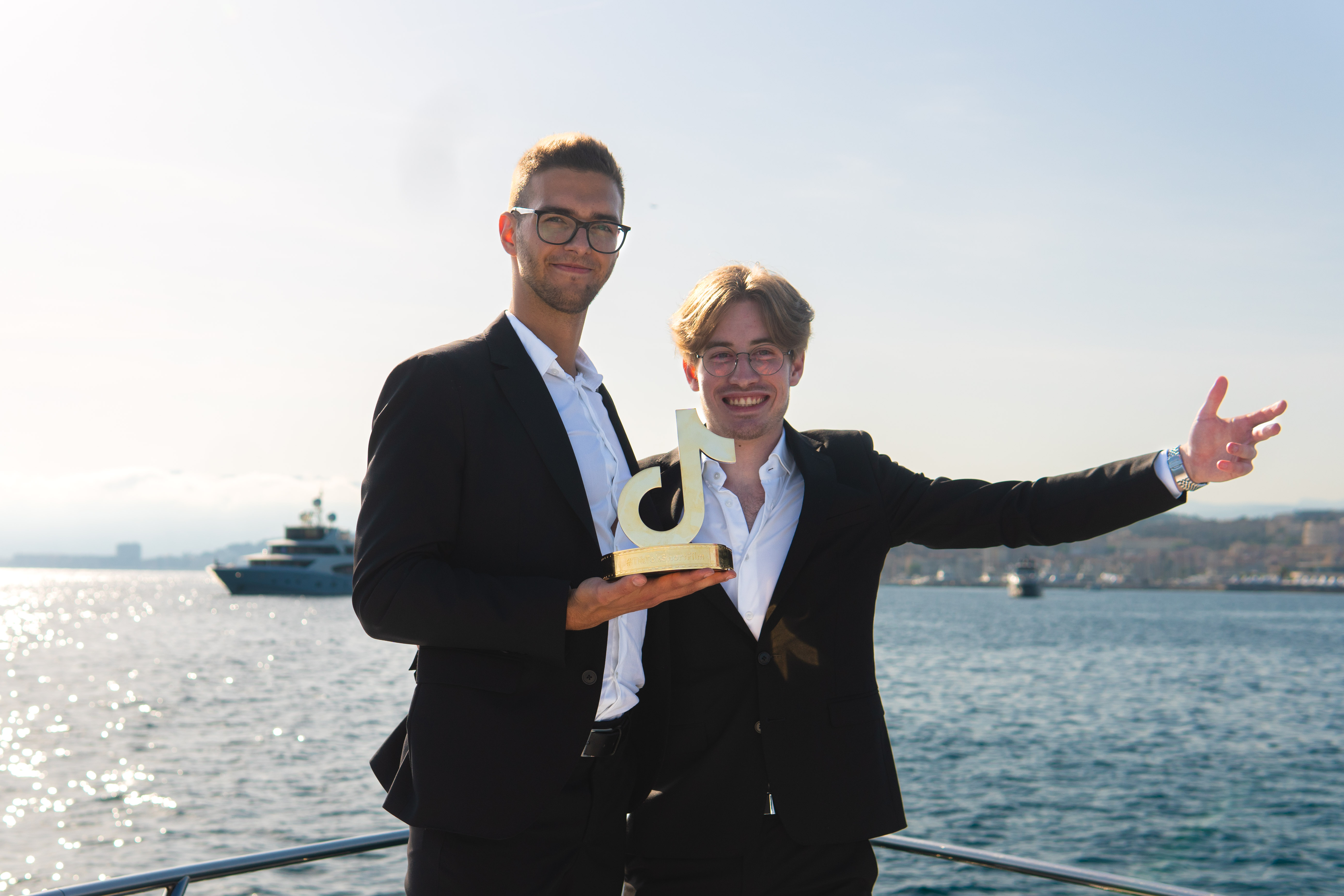
Nik Kranjec and Matej Rimanić
