= Lize Spit =

Belgian writer (born 1988)

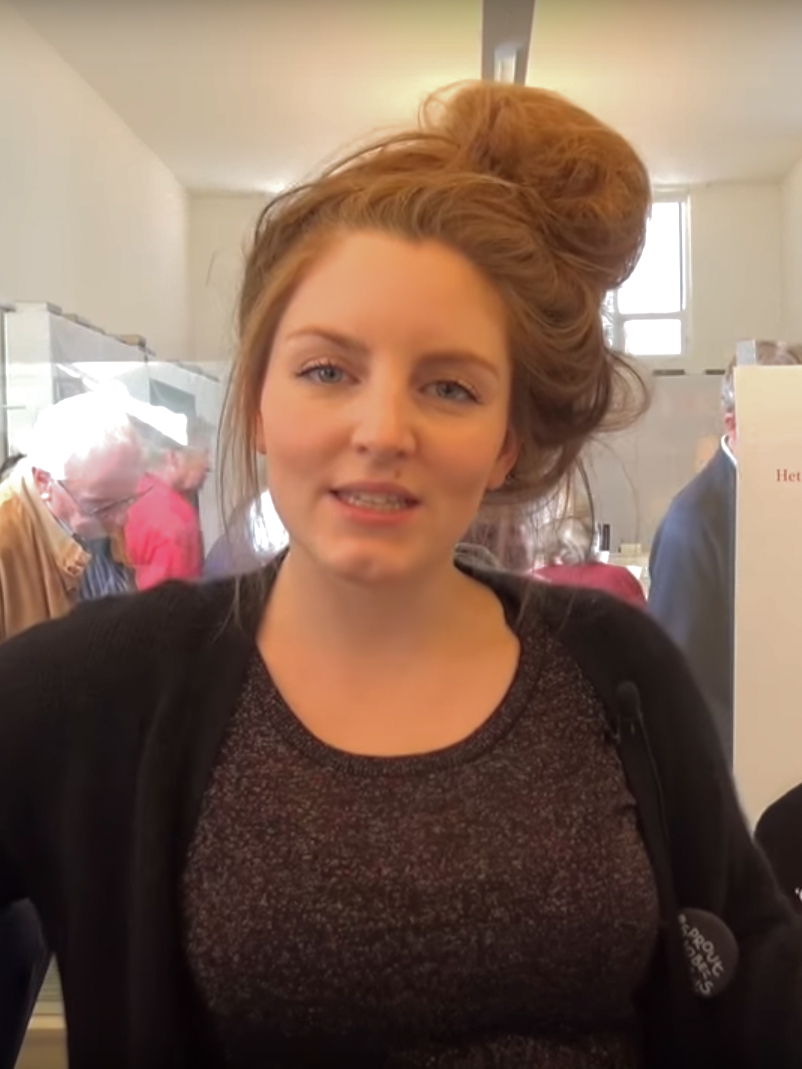
Lize Spit (2016)

Lize Spit (born 1988, in Lier) is a Flemish Belgian writer. Her first novel, Het smelt, won several awards, including the De Bronzen Uil award, and has been translated into French. Her second novel, Ik ben er niet, launched on 10 December 2020

== Biography ==
Spit grew up in Viersel in the Belgian De Kempen region. She studied in Brussels at the Royal Institute for Theatre, Cinema and Sound (RITCS), where she was awarded a master's degree in scriptwriting. In 2013, she won the Write Now! award. After having written her first novel Het smelt, she won the De Bronzen Uil award for this book in 2016. After gaining popularity with this book, she became a columnist for the De Morgen newspaper until 2017.

In 2023, actress Veerle Baetens adapted Het smelt into a film of the same name, starring Charlotte De Bruyne and Rosa Marchant.

== Works ==
- 2016: Het smelt (The Melting)
- 2020: Ik ben er niet
- 2023: De eerlijke vinder
- 2024: Autobiografie van mijn lichaam
