= Vulgaires Machins =

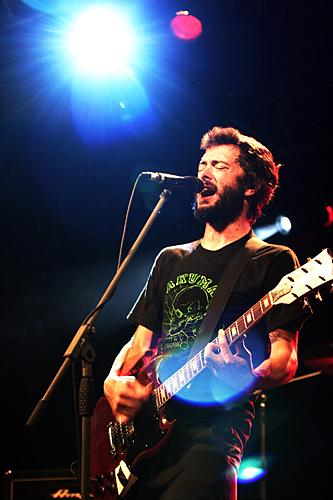
- Guillaume Beauregard in Lac-Mégantic, Québec on August 12, 2007

Background information
- Origin: Granby, Quebec, Canada
- Genres: Punk rock
- Years active: 1995–present
- Labels: Indica Records, Guerilla Asso
- Website: http://www.vulgairesmachins.ca/

Vulgaires Machins is a French Canadian punk rock group from Granby, Quebec. The group consists of Guillaume Beauregard (vocals, guitars), Marie-Ève Roy (vocals, guitars), Maxime Beauregard (bass), and Pat Sayers (drums). Their lyrics denounce consumerism and modern decadence.

== History ==
Vulgaires Machins was formed in 1995. The next year they released their first album, La vie est belle.

Their album Compter les corps was nominated for the Juno Award for Francophone Album of the Year at the Juno Awards of 2007.

The group was also nominated for French Video of the Year at the 2007 MuchMusic Video Awards ("Compter les corps"), and in 2010 their song "Parasites" won the French ECHO songwriting prize. In 2012, they were featured on CBC Television's Studio 12.

Guillaume Beauregard has also released music as a solo artist, receiving a SOCAN Songwriting Prize nomination in 2015 for his solo single "De pluie et de cendre", and has had acting roles including in Maxime Giroux's 2008 film Tomorrow (Demain).

== Discography ==
=== Albums ===
- 1996: La vie est belle (independent)
- 1998: 24-40 (Indica Records)
- 2000: Regarde le monde (Indica Records)
- 2002: Aimer le mal (Indica Records)
- 2004: Cross the bridge/Passe le pont split with Burning Heads (independent/Enrage Production)
- 2006: Compter les corps (Indica Records)
- 2008: Presque Sold-Out (CD/DVD) (Indica Records)
- 2010: Requiem pour les sourds (Indica Records)
- 2011: Vulgaires Machins (Indica Records)
- 2022: Disruption (Costume Records)
- 2025: Contempler l'abîme (Costume Records)

=== Participation in compilations ===
- 1996: From The Basements To Your Socks (IHL Records/My Friend's Sox)
- 1997: Inhale vol. 2 (Indica Records)
- 1999?: All that bunch of punkers (R.A.D.)
- 1999 : 1, 2, 3 Punk
- Independent vol. 1
- 2 tongue 2
