= The Pack (2022 film) =

La jauría
- Film poster
- Directed by: Andrés Ramírez Pulido
- Written by: Andrés Ramírez Pulido
- Produced by: Jean-Étienne Brat; Lou Chicoteau; Angie Gómez; Andrés Ramírez Pulido
- Starring: Jhojan Estiven Jimenez; Maicol Andrés Jimenez
- Cinematography: Balthazar Lab
- Edited by: Julie Duclaux; Juliette Kempf
- Music by: Pierre Desprats
- Production companies: Alta Rocca Films; Valiente Gracia
- Release dates: May 2022 (Cannes); October 20, 2022 (Colombia); April 4, 2023 (France)
- Running time: 86 minutes
- Countries: Colombia; France
- Language: Spanish

The Pack (Spanish: La jauría) is a 2022 Colombian-French drama film written and directed by Andrés Ramírez Pulido in his directorial debut. In May 2022, it won the Critics' Week Award at the 75th Cannes Film Festival. In the same month, Ramírez Pulido received the Society of Dramatic Authors and Composers award for his work on the film. The film was nominated in the Best Ibero-American Film category at the 37th Goya Awards.

== Synopsis ==
In an experimental rehabilitation center in the middle of the jungle, Eliú pays a sentence for murder. When their best friend and accomplice is transferred to the same place, the young people must rebuild their crime and face a past that Eliú wants to get away from. In the midst of therapies and forced labor, Eliú will face the darkness of human nature and will try to escape from his own before it is too late.

== Cast ==
The actors participating in this film are:

- Jhojan Estiven Jimenez as Eliú
- Maicol Andrés Jimenez as El Mono
- Diego Rincón as Godoy
- Miguel Viera as Álvaro
- Carlos Steven Blanco as Le frère d'Eliú
- Ricardo Alberto Parra as Juan Macias
- Jhoani Barreto as Ider
- Marleyda Soto as Tránsito
- Wismer Vásquez as Calculate

== Release ==
The film had its international premiere in May as part of Critics' Week at the 75th Cannes Film Festival. It released on October 20, 2022, in Colombian theaters, and on April 4, 2023, in French theaters.

== Reception ==
The critic Fabien Lermercier of the Cineuropa portal highlighted that the film is "endowed with an eminently convincing cast", and that it "weaves a strange web where the invisible plays with hyperrealism while exploring themes such as truth, family and freedom". Jonathan Holland of Screendaily stated that the film "combines powerful atmospheric elements with suspense and classic tragedy in a haunting and disturbing tone, providing a fresh, sensitive and thoughtful perspective on the cinema of gang culture in Latin America."
