= The Lost Boys (2023 film) =

2023 Belgian-French drama film

- Film poster
- French: Le Paradis
- Directed by: Zeno Graton
- Written by: Zeno Graton; Clara Bourreau; Maarten Loix
- Produced by: Priscilla Bertin; Valérie Bournonville; Judith Nora; Joseph Rouschop
- Starring: Khalil Ben Gharbia; Julien de Saint Jean; Eye Haïdara
- Cinematography: Olivier Boonjing
- Edited by: Arnaud Bellemans; Nobuo Coste
- Music by: Bachar Khalifé
- Production companies: Tarantula; Silex Films; Menuetto Film
- Distributed by: O'Brother Distribution; Rézo Films
- Release date: 19 February 2023 (Berlin)
- Running time: 83 minutes
- Countries: Belgium; France
- Language: French

The Lost Boys (French: Le Paradis) is a 2023 drama film written and directed by Zeno Graton in his feature debut. The film centres on a romance between Joe (Khalil Ben Gharbia) and William (Julien de Saint Jean), two teenagers incarcerated in a youth detention center.

The ensemble cast also includes Eye Haïdara, Jonathan Couzinié, Matéo Bastien, Samuel Di Napoli, Amine Hamidou, Nlandu Lubansu, Terry Ngoga, Audrey D'Hulstère, Laurence Oltuski, David Leclercq, Noémie Van Cauwelaert, Marc-Elie Piedagnel, Marc Gallo, Aurélien Vandenbeyvanghe, Samir Asghir and Giovanni Vanhaerens in supporting roles.

The film premiered at the 73rd Berlin International Film Festival. It was later screened at TIFF Next Wave and the BFI London Film Festival. At the 13th Magritte Awards, The Lost Boys received six nominations, including Best Film. Best Director and Best Screenplay for Graton.

== Critical reception ==
The Lost Boys has an approval rate of 100% on review aggregator website Rotten Tomatoes, based on 15 reviews. Alice Saville from Time Out described it as "a powerfully physical romance shaded in dreamy, intense colours." Randy Myers from The Mercury News wrote that "the leads are exceptional, and Graton's direction and pacing never slackens."

Ben Turner, writing for The Pink Lens, called it both "dark, gritty and filled with hopelessness" and "a tragic and sad coming-of-age movie that turns the genre on its head."

== Accolades ==
Award	Date of ceremony	Category	Recipient(s)	Result	Ref.
Berlin International Film Festival	26 February 2023	Crystal Bear		Nominated	
Berlin International Film Festival	26 February 2023	Teddy Award		Nominated	
Magritte Awards	9 March 2024	Best Film		Nominated	
Magritte Awards	9 March 2024	Best Director	Zeno Graton	Nominated	
Magritte Awards	9 March 2024	Best Screenplay	Zeno Graton and Clara Bourreau	Nominated	
Magritte Awards	9 March 2024	Best First Feature Film		Nominated	
Magritte Awards	9 March 2024	Most Promising Actor	Amine Hamidou	Nominated	
Magritte Awards	9 March 2024	Most Promising Actor	Nlandu Lubansu	Nominated	
Molodist Film Awards	29 October 2023	Best International Film		Won	
Thessaloniki Film Festival	12 November 2023	Best Film		Nominated	
Thessaloniki Film Festival	12 November 2023	Best Screenplay	Zeno Graton and Clara Bourreau	Won	

== See also ==
- List of LGBTQ-related films
