= Tomorrow (2008 film) =

- French: Demain
- Directed by: Maxime Giroux
- Written by: Alexandre Laferrière; Maxime Giroux
- Produced by: Paul Barbeau; Maxime Giroux
- Starring: Eugénie Beaudry; Guillaume Beauregard; Serge Houde
- Cinematography: Sara Mishara
- Edited by: Mathieu Bouchard-Malo
- Production company: NuFilms
- Distributed by: Les Films Séville
- Release date: November 2008 (Torino)
- Running time: 100 minutes
- Country: Canada
- Languages: English; French

Tomorrow (French: Demain) is a Canadian drama film, directed by Maxime Giroux and released in 2009. The film stars Eugénie Beaudry as Sophie, a woman who begins a casual affair with Jérôme (Guillaume Beauregard) while caring for her ailing father Richard (Serge Houde), but finds it to be essentially a one-way relationship from which she wants more than Jérôme is prepared to give.

The film premiered at the 26th Torino Film Festival in 2008, before going into theatrical release in 2009.
