= 1985 (TV series) =

2023 Belgian television series

- Written by: Willem Wallyn
- Directed by: Wouter Bouvijn
- Country of origin: Belgium
- Original languages: Dutch; French
- No. of series: 1
- No. of episodes: 8

Production
- Producers: Gunter Schmid; Peter Bouckaert
- Production company: Eyeworks

Original release
- Network: Eén; La Une
- Release: January 22 – March 12, 2023

1985 is a 2023 Belgian television series about the Brabant killers.

== Cast ==
- Tijmen Govaerts as Marc De Vuyst
- Aimé Claeys as Franky Verhellen
- Mona Mina Leon as Vicky Verhellen
- Peter Van Den Begin as Herman Vernaillen
- Tom Vermeir as Guy Goffinard
- Titus De Voogdt as Philippe Debels
- Roda Fawaz as Madani Bouhouche
- Guillaume Kerbusch as Robert Beijer
