= Jean-Claude Raspiengeas =

French journalist and literary critic (born 1958)

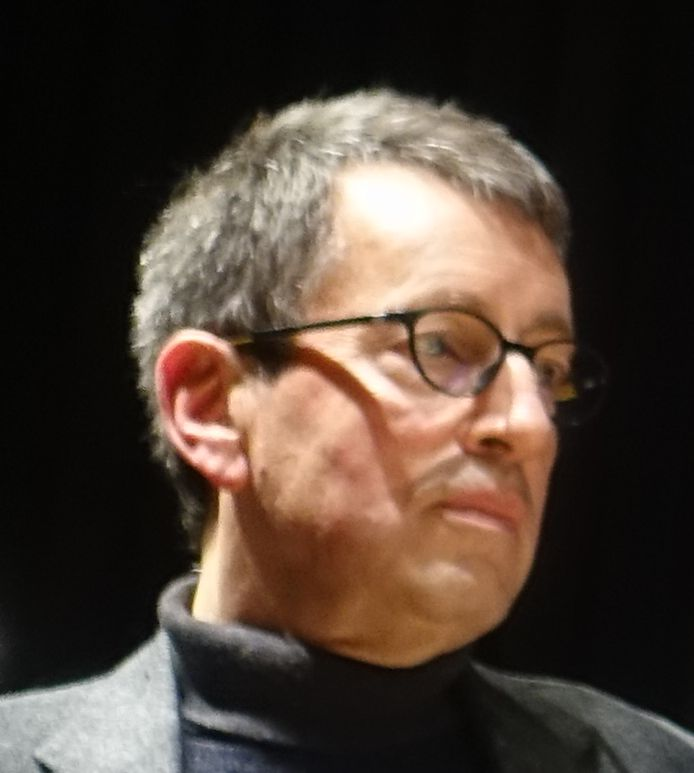
Jean-Claude Raspiengeas

Jean-Claude Raspiengeas (born 1958) is a French journalist and literary critic.

== Biography ==
A graduate from the Institut d'études politiques de Bordeaux, Jean-Claude Raspiengeas turned his attention to publishing with his entry into the editorial bureau of Les Nouvelles littéraires then directed by Philippe Tesson and Jean-François Kahn. From 1984 he worked as senior-reporter for Télérama which he left in 2002 for the daily La Croix of which he became head of the culture department.

Jean-Claude Raspiengeas is also a literary critic on France Inter in the program Le Masque et la Plume.

In March 2014 he became grand reporter of the culture department of the newspaperLa Croix.

== Publications ==
- 1995: L'Esprit de résistance, with Serge Ravanel, Éditions du Seuil, ISBN 2020190281.
- 1999: Je prends la liberté, with Jacques Gaillot, Flammarion, ISBN 2080671669.
- 2001: Bertrand Tavernier, Flammarion, ISBN 2080681125.
- 2001: La Haine antisémite, with Serge Moati, Flammarion, ISBN 2080666304.
