= Here (2023 film) =

2023 film by Bas Devos

- Theatrical release poster
- Directed by: Bas Devos
- Written by: Bas Devos; Nabil Ben Yadir; Agung Bagus
- Produced by: Marc Goyens; Nabil Ben Yadir
- Starring: Stefan Gota; Liyo Gong; Nanna Voss; Teodor Corban; Saadia Bentaïeb; Alina Constantin; ShuHuan Wang; Victor Claudio Zichil; Jovial Mbengga; Sanae Khamlichi; Stella Kitoga; Misha van der Werf; Giovanni Chiva; Laurent Kumba; Maakie Neuville; Marian Uram; Hafsa Aqqal; Pilar Verbinnen; Ghasem Mousavi; Rudy Verbinnen; Karim Akalay; Simon Allem
- Cinematography: Grimm Vandekerckhove; Agung Bagus; Manuel Alberto Claro
- Edited by: Janus Billeskov Jansen
- Music by: Brecht Ameel
- Production companies: Nordisk Film Production; SF Studios; Motor
- Distributed by: The Cinema Guild
- Release date: August 2023
- Running time: 84 minutes
- Country: Belgium
- Language: French

Here is a 2023 drama film directed by Bas Devos.

== Synopsis ==
A Romanian construction worker in Brussels meets a Chinese graduate student just before he is supposed to return to his country.

== Cast ==
- Stefan Gota as Stefan
- Liyo Gong as Shuxiu
- Saadia Bentaïeb as Saadia
- Alina Constantin as Anca
- Victor Claudio Zichil as Radu
- Jovial Mbenga as Jovial
- Pilar Verbinnen as Devis
- Ghasem Mousavi as Nurse

== Reception ==
On the review aggregator Rotten Tomatoes website, the film has an approval rating of 95% based on 38 reviews, with an average rating of 7.8/10. On Metacritic, the film received a score of 92 out of 100, based on 10 critics, indicating "universal acclaim."

=== Accolades ===
Award	Date	Category	Recipient	Result	Ref.
Magritte Awards	22 February 2025	Best Flemish Film	Here	Nominated	
