= Holly (2023 film) =

2023 film by Fien Troch

- Theatrical release poster
- Directed by: Fien Troch
- Written by: Fien Troch
- Produced by: Antonino Lombardo; Elisa Heene
- Starring: Cathalina Geeraerts; Felix Heremans; Greet Verstraete
- Cinematography: Frank van den Eeden
- Edited by: Nico Leunen
- Music by: Johnny Jewel
- Production companies: Prime Time; Mirage; Tarantula; Les Films du Fleuve; Topkapi Films; Tabiki Film; Agat Films
- Distributed by: Cinéart
- Release dates: 7 September 2023 (Venice); 22 November 2023 (Belgium); 6 March 2024 (France); 7 March 2024 (Netherlands)
- Running time: 103 minutes
- Countries: Belgium; Netherlands; Luxembourg; France
- Language: Dutch
- Budget: €2.7 million

Holly is a 2023 Dutch-language drama film written and directed by Fien Troch. It is an international co-production between Belgium, Netherlands, Luxembourg and France.

The film was selected to compete for the Golden Lion at the 80th Venice International Film Festival, where it premiered on 7 September 2023.

== Synopsis ==
One morning, 15-year-old Holly calls in absent to her school. Shortly thereafter, a serious fire breaks out, which destroys part of the school building and takes the lives of several students. Months later, the accident has still not been fully processed by the traumatized city population. Teacher Anna has created a volunteer group for the grieving community to give comfort to one another. Intrigued by Holly's strange premonition, she invites her to join her group. The girl's presence seems to bring unexpected peace of mind, warmth and hope to the group members. Without Anna's help, people soon begin to seek out Holly and her cathartic energy and demand more and more of her. The gifted girl unwittingly becomes the town's savior. The line between support and abuse is beginning to blur.

== Cast ==
- Cathalina Geeraerts as Holly
- Felix Heremans as Bart
- Greet Verstraete as Anna
- Serdi Faki Alici as Anna's husband
- Els Deceukelier as Holly's mother
- Maya Louisa Sterkendries as Dawn
- Robby Cleiren
- Sara De Bosschere

== Production ==
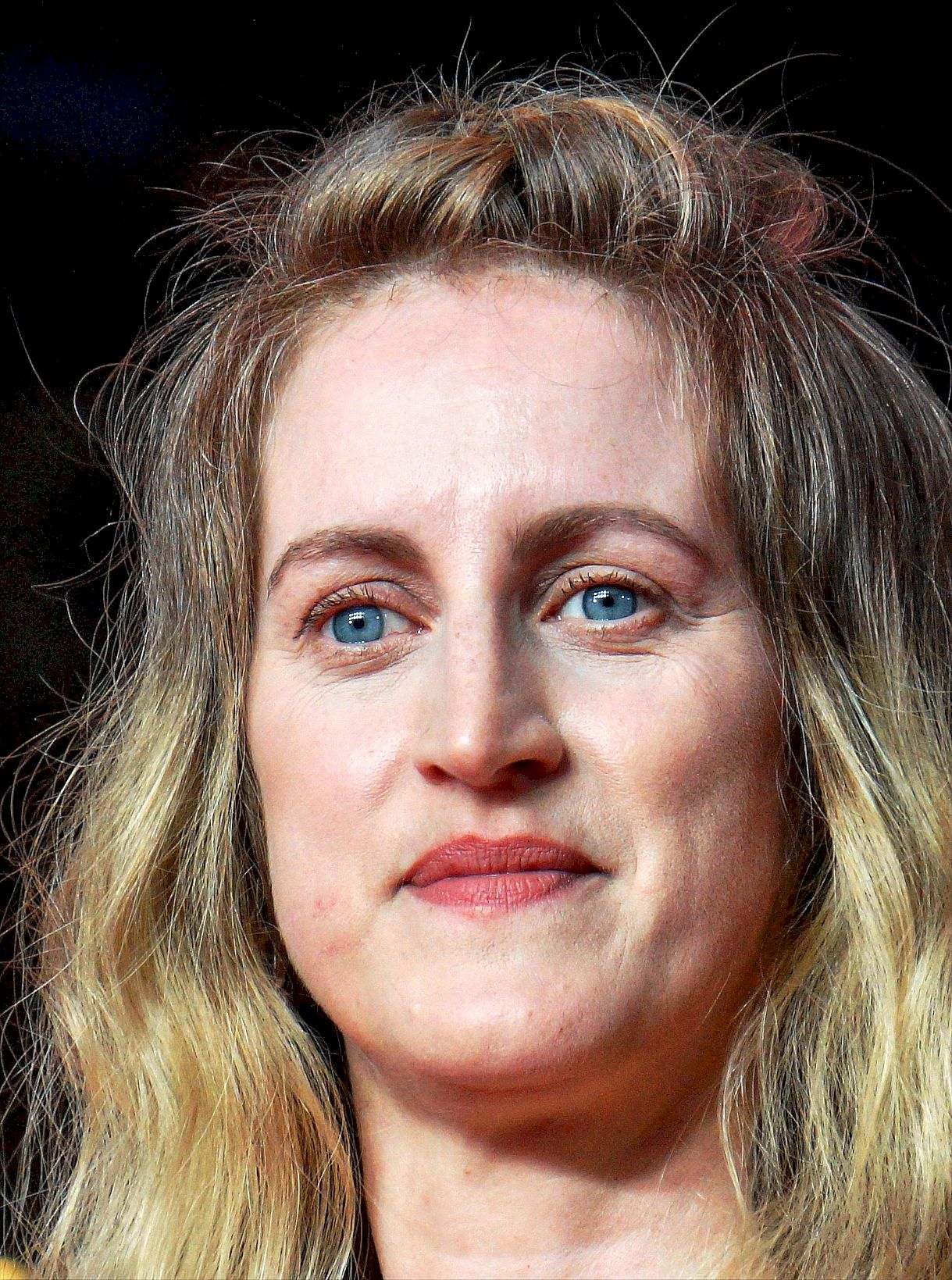
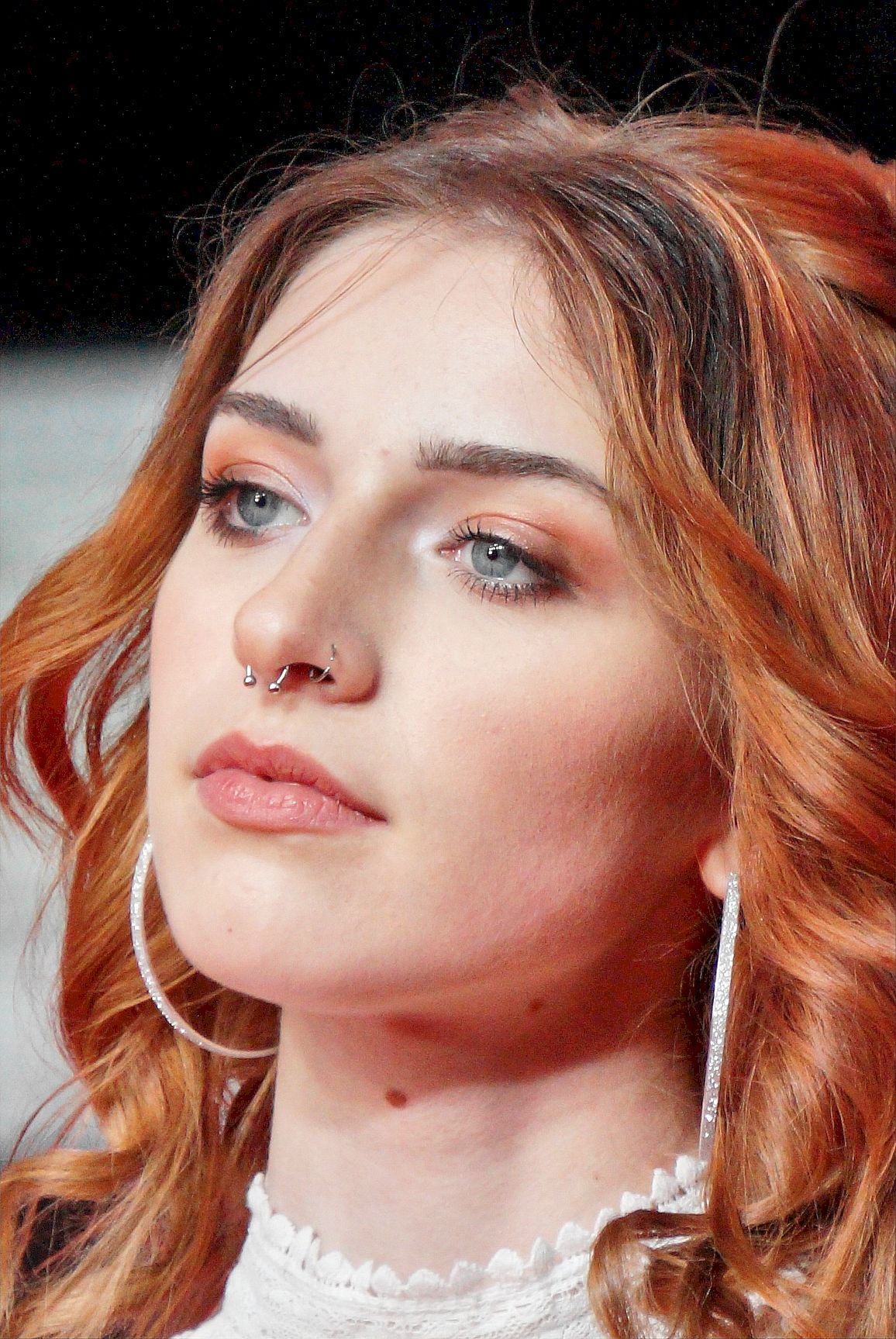
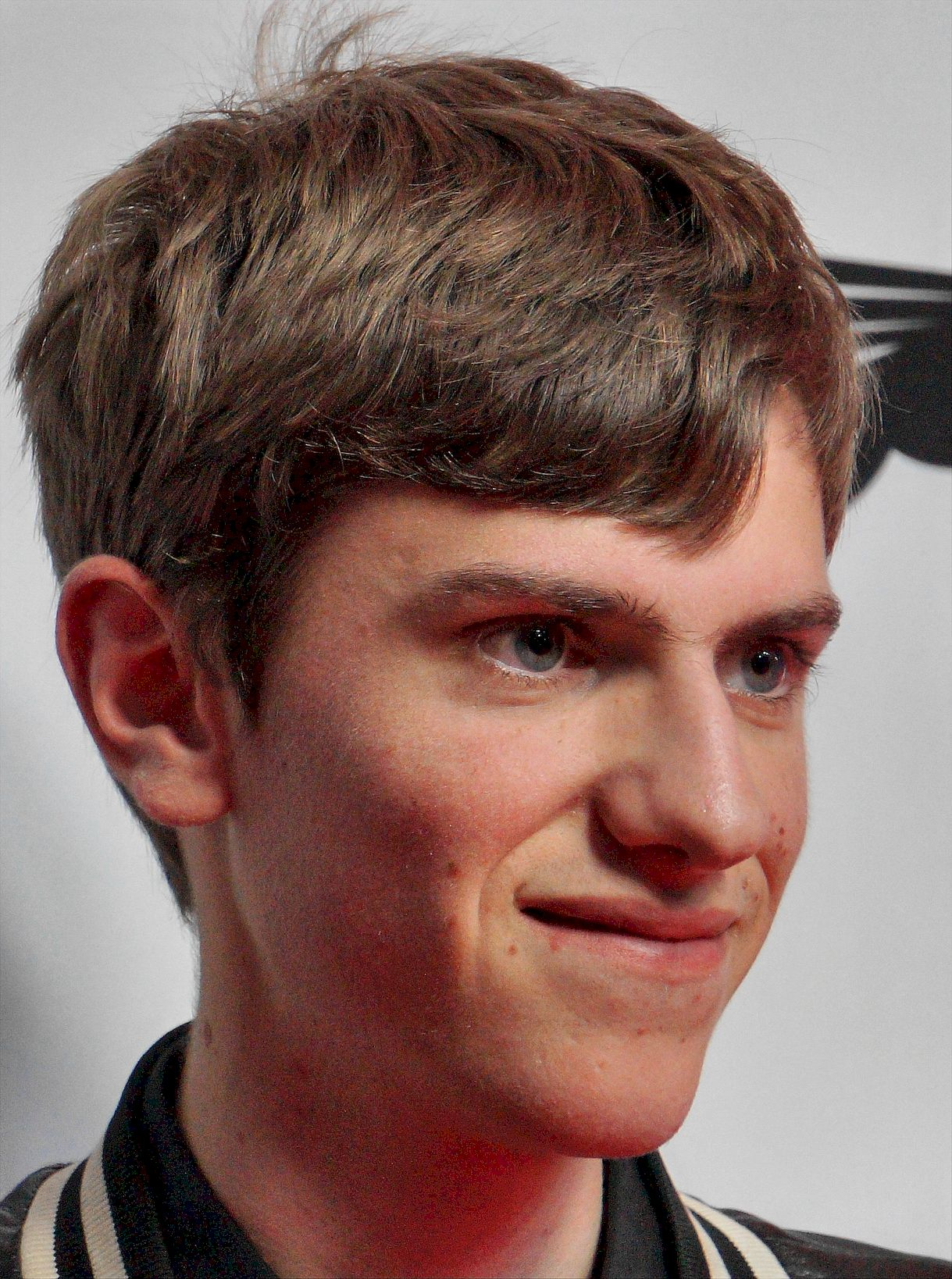
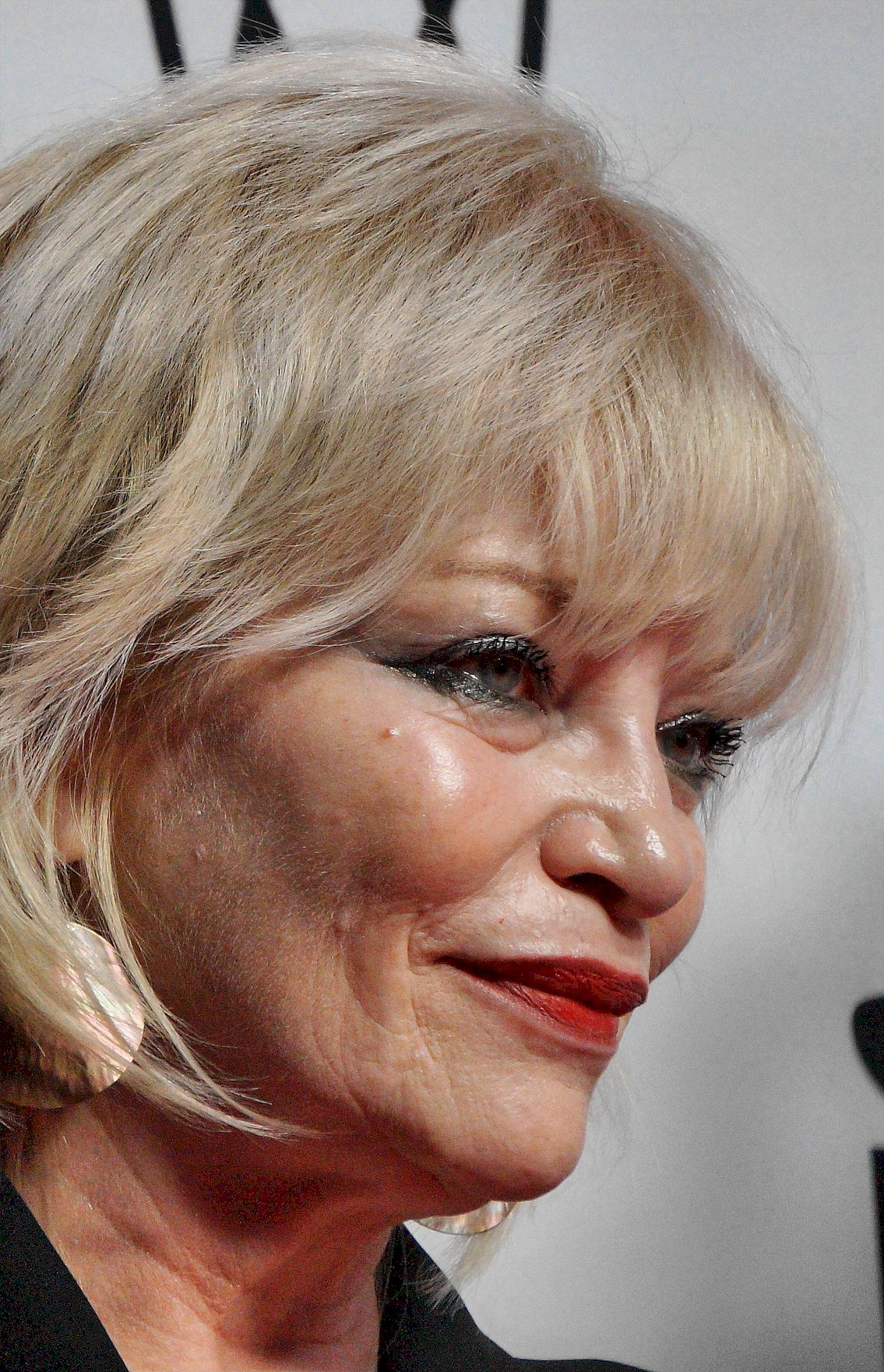
Clockwise, from top left: Fien Troch, Cathalina Geeraerts, Els Deceukelier and Felix Heremans, for the presentation of Holly at Film Fest Gent 2023

For the film, Troch again teamed with Frank van den Eeden as director of photography, and her husband Nico Leunen as editor, the latter of whom has been involved in all of Troch's works. For the film's score, she enlisted the American musician Johnny Jewel, former member of the band Chromatics, who she already worked with on her previous feature film Home (2016).

As of September 2021, the film was budgeted at €2.5 million. It was produced by Antonino Lombardo for his company Prime Time (Belgium) and Elisa Heene for Mirage (Belgium), in co-production with Tarantula (Luxembourg), Les Films du Fleuve (Belgium), Topkapi (Netherlands), Tabiki (Netherlands) and Agat Films (France). Production support was provided by Flanders Audiovisual Fund (VAF), Casa Kafka, Cinéart, Netherlands Film Fund, Centre du Cinéma et de l'Audiovisuel de la Fédération Wallonie-Bruxelles, Film Fund Luxembourg.

== Release ==
Holly was selected to compete for the Golden Lion at the 80th Venice International Film Festival, where it had its world premiere on 7 September 2023. It was also invited at the 28th Busan International Film Festival in 'World Cinema' section and was screened on 6 October 2023.

The film was released in Belgium on 22 November 2023 by Cinéart, who also distributed the film in the Netherlands on 7 March 2024. New Story distributed the film in France on 6 March 2024.

== Reception ==
=== Critical response ===
On the review aggregator website Rotten Tomatoes, the film holds an approval rating of 67% based on 12 reviews, with an average rating of 5.9/10.

=== Accolades ===
| Award | Date of ceremony | Category | Recipient(s) | Result | Ref. |
|---|---|---|---|---|---|
| Arras Film Festival | 12 November 2023 | Golden Atlas | Holly | Won | |
| Chicago International Film Festival | 22 October 2023 | Gold Hugo | Holly | Nominated | |
| Magritte Award | 9 March 2024 | Best Flemish Film | Holly | Nominated | |
| Venice Film Festival | 9 September 2023 | Golden Lion | Holly | Nominated | |
