= When It Melts =

2023 film directed by Veerle Baetens

- Film poster
- Directed by: Veerle Baetens
- Written by: Veerle Baetens; Maarten Loix
- Based on: The Melting by Lize Spit
- Produced by: Bart Van Langendonck; Ellen Havenith; Jacques-Henri Bronckart; Arlette Zylberberg
- Cinematography: Frederic Van Zandycke
- Edited by: Thomas Pooters
- Music by: Bjorn Eriksson
- Production companies: Savage Film; Flanders Image
- Release dates: 21 January 2023 (Sundance); 25 October 2023
- Running time: 111 minutes
- Countries: Belgium; Netherlands
- Language: Dutch

When It Melts (Dutch: Het smelt) is a 2023 drama film written and directed by Veerle Baetens in her directorial debut. It is loosely based on the 2016 novel The Melting (Het smelt) by Lize Spit. The film stars Charlotte De Bruyne and Rosa Marchant, and explores themes of childhood trauma, the influence of family dynamics, and the struggle for personal identity.

The film had its world premiere at the 2023 Sundance Film Festival where it competed for the Grand Jury Prize Dramatic. At the 2023 Ensor Awards, When It Melts received eight nominations, including Best Film and Best Director for Baetens.

== Plot ==
Eva grows up with two boys in the small village of Bovenmeer. As they reach adolescence, the boys come up with cruel schemes, and Eva is faced with the difficult decision of whether to go along with them, a choice she feels powerless to avoid. Thirteen years after that fateful summer spiraled out of control, Eva returns to her hometown with a block of ice in the trunk of her car, intent on confronting the trauma of her past.

== Production ==
Production for When It Melts was initially in the hands of the production company Menuet. After it ceased to exist in 2017, Savage Film, led by Bart Van Langendonck and Sarah Marks, took over. In early 2020, the film project was presented at the Berlinale production market, where it won the ArteKino International Prize. The film also received financial support from the Netherlands Film Fund and the Flanders Audiovisual Fund.

In August 2021, filming commenced across various locations in Belgium, spanning two months. Actress Veerle Baetens made her directorial debut with the project, after five years of preparation, which included working with Maarten Loix to adapt Lize Spit's novel The Melting (Het smelt) into a screenplay. The film was initially scheduled for release on November 24, 2022, but was postponed to the fall of 2023. In early December 2022, it was selected for the World Cinema Dramatic competition at the Sundance Film Festival in the United States, where it had its world premiere on 21 January 2023.

== Reception ==
=== Critical response ===
When It Melts received positive reviews from critics. On review aggregator website AlloCiné, the film holds an average score of three and a half stars out of five, based on a survey of 18 reviews.

=== Accolades ===
Award / Film Festival	Category	Recipients and nominees	Result
Dragon Award	Best First Feature Film		Nominated
Ensor Award	Best Film		Nominated
Ensor Award	Best Director	Veerle Baetens	Nominated
Ensor Award	Best Screenplay	Veerle Baetens and Maarten Loix	Nominated
Ensor Award	Best Performance in a Leading Role	Charlotte De Bruyne	Nominated
Ensor Award	Best Performance in a Leading Role	Rosa Marchant	Nominated
Ensor Award	Best Sound	Geert Vlegels and Pedro Van der Eecken	Nominated
Ensor Award	Best Original Score	Bjorn Eriksson	Nominated
Ensor Award	Best Costume Design	Manu Verschueren	Nominated
Magritte Award	Best Flemish Film		Won
Sundance Film Festival	Grand Jury Prize		Nominated
Sundance Film Festival	Best Performance	Rosa Marchant	Won
World Soundtrack Award	Best Original Score	Bjorn Eriksson	Nominated
