= The Shaft (2008 film) =

2008 Chinese film

The Shaft is a three-episode Chinese drama movie written and directed by Zhang Chi. It stars Zheng Louqian, Li Chen, Huang Xuan and Luo Deyuan.
