= Zeno Graton =

Belgian film director

- Occupations: Director; Screenwriter
- Notable work: The Lost Boys

Zeno Graton is a Belgian film director and screenwriter, whose debut feature film The Lost Boys (Le Paradis) premiered at the 73rd Berlin International Film Festival in 2023.

Graton studied film at INSAS. He directed the short films Seagulls (Mouettes) in 2013 and Jay Amongst Men (Jay parmi les hommes) in 2015. Seagulls won awards at the Namur Film Festival and the Brussels Short Film Festival, and Jay Amongst Men received a Magritte Award nomination for Best Live Action Short Film at the 6th Magritte Awards in 2016. He was a Cinéfondation resident in the fall 2016 and winter 2017 session.

He served on the Queer Palm jury at the 2023 Cannes Film Festival.

He is of partial Tunisian descent, and identifies as queer.
