= Fien Troch =

Film director, producer, writer

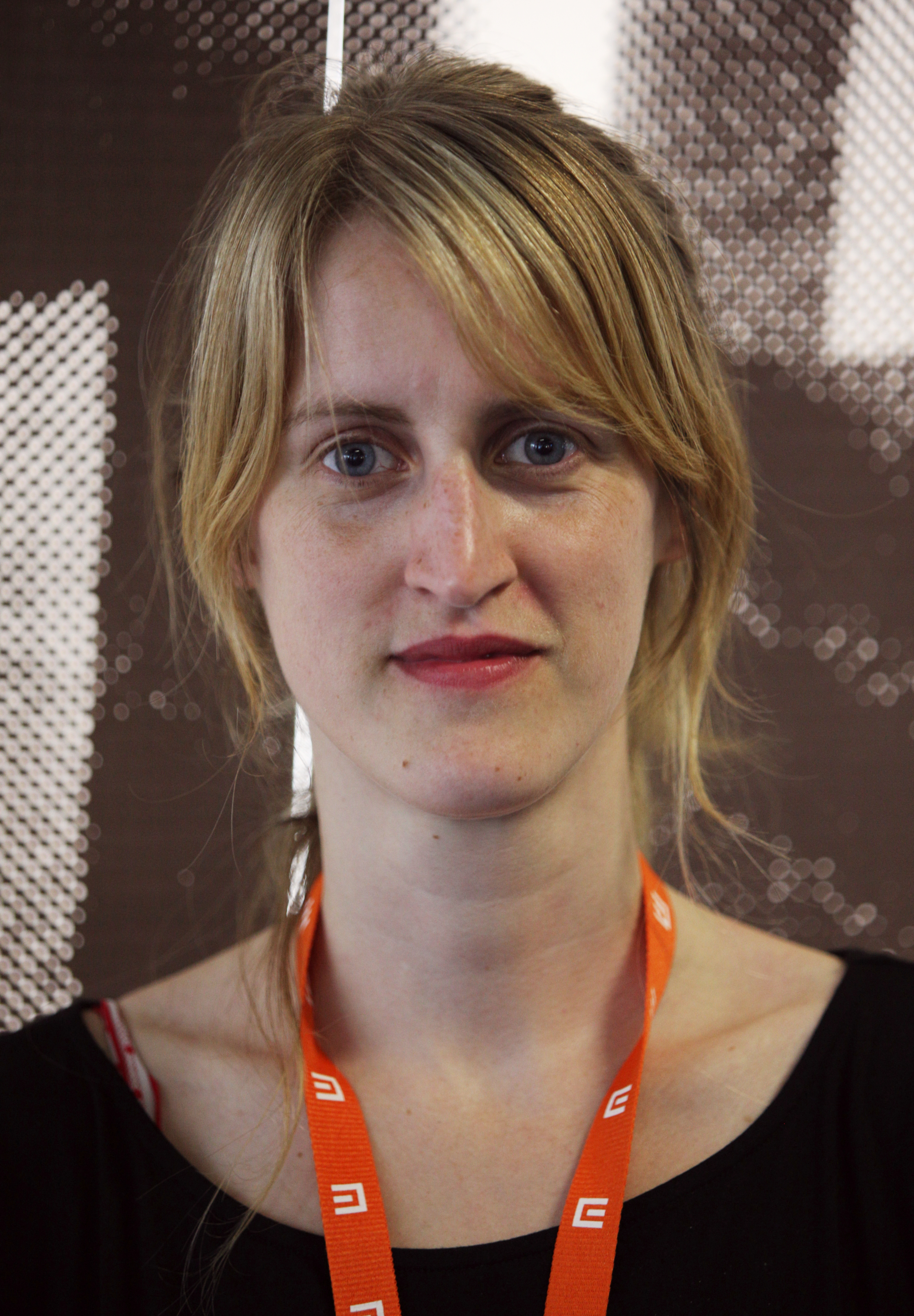
Fien Troch at the 44th Karlovy Vary International Film Festival in 2009

Fien Troch (born 1978, in Londerzeel) is a Belgian film director, producer and screenwriter.

== Career ==
After graduating from the Sint-Lukas art academy in Brussels in 2000, she achieved several nominations and awards in her chosen career.

Her first full-length film Someone Else's happiness is a psychological drama film that deals with how a fatal car accident affects a small village in Flanders. The film was nominated for the Grand Prix (2005) at the Flanders International Film Festival Ghent and for the Joseph Plateau Award (2006) for Best Belgian Director and Best Belgian Screenplay.

Moreover, in 2005 at Thessaloniki Film Festival it won the Golden Alexander and an award for Best Screenplay. At the 62nd edition of the Torino Film Festival it also won the prize for Best Actress.

Her second film Unspoken depicts the aftermath of the disappearance of a young girl. The film received the André Cavens Award for Best Film by the Belgian Film Critics Association (UCC). Her 2012 film Kid was nominated for two Magritte Awards.

For her 2016 film Home Troch won the award for Best Director in the Horizons section at the 73rd Venice International Film Festival.

== Personal life ==
Troch is married to writer and editor Nico Leunen. They have two children together.

== Filmography ==
- Verbrande aarde (short,1998)
- Wooww (short, 1999)
- Maria (short, 2000)
- Cool Sam & Sweet Suzy (short, 2001)
- Someone Else's Happiness (2005)
- Unspoken (2008)
- Kid (2012)
- Home (2016)
- The Responder (2022) – 2 episodes
- Holly (2023)
