= Brussels Short Film Festival =

Short film festival in Brussels, Belgium, 1998-

The Brussels Short Film Festival (BSFF) has been run by the non-profit organisation "Un Soir … Un Grain" since 1998. It is an annual event and has taken place every year since its inaugural event, with the exception of 2020, due to the COVID-19 pandemic. As of 2021 the festival shows about 300 short films each year from Belgium and around the world, with about a hundred of these being entered into its competitions. It also hosts workshops, seminars and other events, attracting about 25,000 visitors.

== Competitions ==
BSFF has been an Oscars Qualifying Film Festival since 2018, meaning that the winners of the International and National Competitions are eligible for consideration in the Best Animated Short Film or Live Action Short Film category of the Academy Awards, with no requirement for the usual theatrical run beforehand.

The European Short Film Audience Award (ESFAA) was launched in 2019, as a collaboration between BSFF and nine other European film festivals. The winner is announced in Brussels. The winner of the Audience Award of the National Competition is selected for the ESFAA competition, along with the other nine audience award winners from the other festivals.

As of 2026, the film festival awards many film prizes in one of three categories: International Competition, National Competition, and Next Generation (for students' films), as well as the ESFAA. There is no requirement that a film in competition premieres at the festival. The "Be Tv" Award, awarded in the National Competition, gives broadcasting rights by Be TV.

== Locations ==
The locations for the screenings and other events include Flagey, the Vendôme cinema, Cinema Galeries and Mont des Arts.

== 2021 edition ==
In 2021, the 24th edition of festival will run from 28 August to 5 September, later than its originally scheduled dates of 21 April to 1 May. The 2021 festival will include a selection of the nearly 6800 films received for entry across 2020 and 2021, with 98 films selected for the International Competition.
