= Peter Van Den Begin =

Belgian actor and director

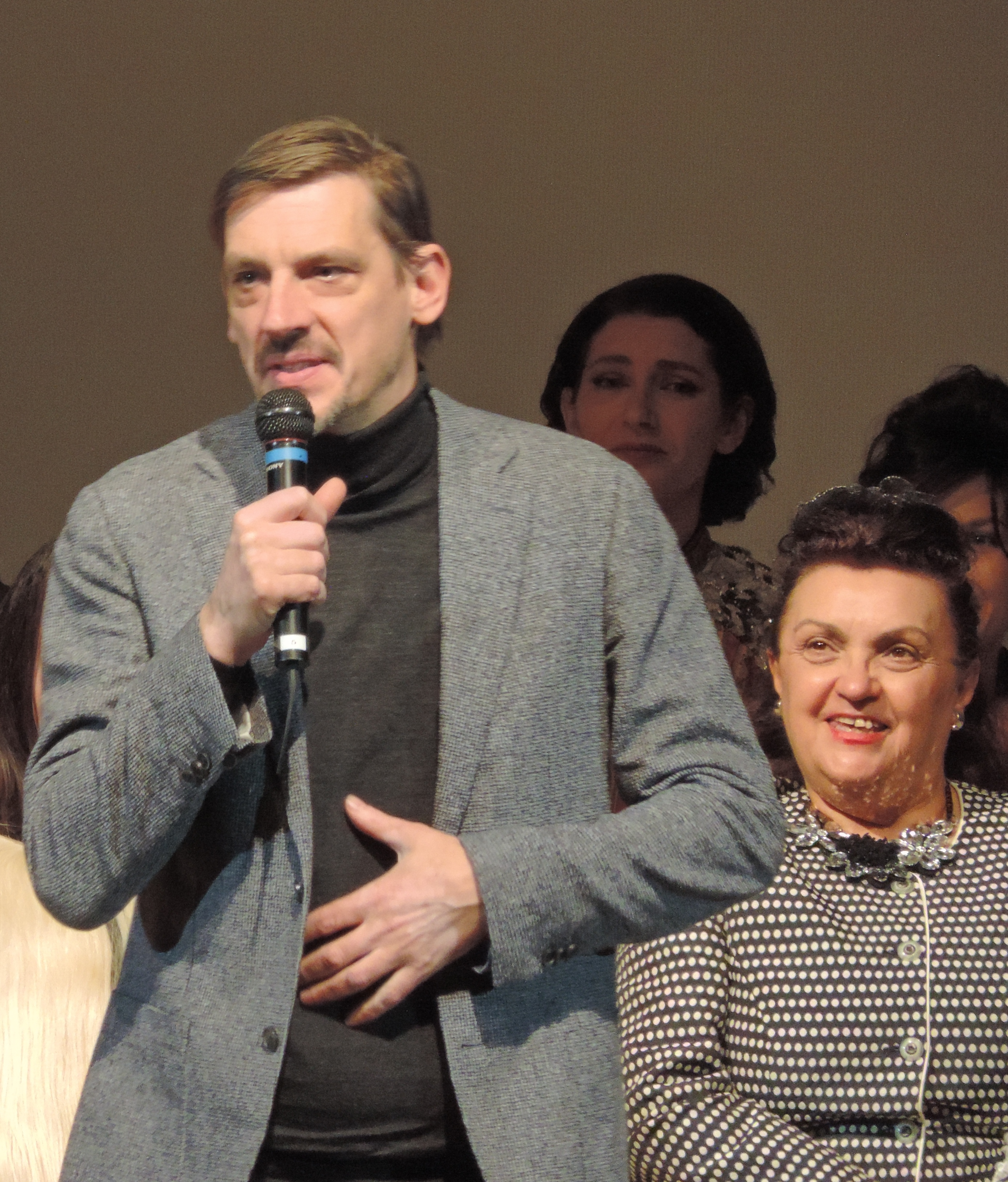
Peter Van Den Begin, 2017

Peter Alfons Christiaan Van Den Begin (born 25 October 1964 in Berchem) is a Belgian actor and director. He has two daughters with actress and singer-songwriter Tine Reymer.

His very first theater performances include acting in such plays as De Straat (Ronald Van Rillaer), Droomspel (Mannen van den Dam) and De getemde feeks (theaterMalpertuis). Later on he has continued his theater acting career by performing in various plays. Under Blauwe Maandag Compagnie he has performed in such pieces like All for love, Joko and Vrijen met dieren.

== Awards ==
In the 44th Gent Film Festival in 2017 Van de Begin received two Flemish Actors' Guild awards as the best actor both in theater for his role in Risjaar Drei (Olympique Dramatique & Toneelhuis) and in film for his performance in the movie King of the Belgians.

== Filmography ==
Year	Film	Role
1986	De Paniekzaaiers	Assistant
1989	Zapp	Presentator
1991	De getemde feeks	Gremio
1991	De bossen van Vlaanderen	Koetsier
1993	De zevende hemel	Claude
1993	Moeder, waarom leven wij?	Mario
1995	Hoogste tijd	Etienne
1995	De (V)Liegende Doos	Presentator
?	Heterdaad	Guy Renquin
1996	Alles moet weg	Andreeke
1996	De tijdreiziger	?
1997	Windkracht 10	Kapitein Sie
1998	Verbrande aarde	Jos
1998	De Raf en Ronny Show	Ronny
1998	Out (1998 film)	?
1998	Dief!	George
1998	Le bal masqué	Peter Daerden
1999	Wooww	?
1999	Kaas	Van der Zijpen Junior
1999	Raf en Ronny II	Ronny
1999	Film 1	Willem Wallyn
2000	Bruxelles mon amour	Jens
2000	Maria	?
2000	Penalty	Thierry
2000	Team Spirit	Eddy
2000	Plop in de Wolken	Kabouter Jeuk
2001	Debby en Nancy Laid Knight	Debby
2001	Raf en Ronny III	Ronny
2001	De verlossing	Johnny
2003	Verder dan de maan	Kneutje
2003	Team Spirit 2	Eddy
2004	De duistere diamant	Tante Sidonia
2004	Sketch à gogo	?
2004	10 jaar leuven kort	?
2004	Erik of het klein insectenboek	Duizendpoot
2005	Team Spirit - de serie 2	Eddy
2005	Matroesjka's	Raymond Van Mechelen
2005	Lepel	Ballonvaarder
2005	Too Fat Too Furious	Vuk
2005	Enneagram	Hendrick
2005	Een Ander Zijn Geluk	Mark
2005	Als 't maar beweegt	Frans Gheysen
2005	Buitenspel	Scheidsrechter
2005	De Parelvissers	
2007	Debby & Nancy's Happy hour	Debby
2007	Firmin	Jespers
2007	Matroesjka's 2	Raymond Van Mechelen
2008	Fans	Beatrijs, Elvis Seghers, Luc Renders
2008	Wit Licht	François Lama
2009	Oud België	Marcel
2009	Anubis en de wraak van Arghus	Arghus
2009	True West	Lee
2009	Dirty Mind	David Vandewoestijne
2009	Suske en Wiske: De Texas rakkers	Rik (stem)
2009	Peter & De Wolf	Verteller
2010	Frits & Freddy	Frits
2010	Oliver!	Fagin
2011	Peter & De Wolf	Verteller
2011	Allez, Eddy!	André
2012	Met Man en Macht	
2012	Deadline 14.10	Bert Coenen
2014 - 2017	Hollands Hoop	Dimitri Dugour
2016	Den Elfde van den Elfde	Frank Geunings
2016	Everybody Happy	Ralph Hartman
2017	Tabula Rasa	Vronsky
2017	Dode Hoek	Jan Verbeeck
2017	Storm: Letters van Vuur	Van der Hulst
2019	Adoration	Oscar Batts
2020	Fair Trade	Patrick Paternoster
2021	Earwig	The Stranger
2022	Good People	Serge Vandersteen
2023	1985	Herman Vernaillen
2026	Le Faux Soir	
2026	Diane in the Loop	

=== Writing ===
Together with Stany Crets he has been a writer for:

Year	Film
1998	De Raf en Ronny Show
1999	Raf en Ronny II
2001	Debby en Nancy Laid Knight
2001	Raf en Ronny III
2004	Sketch à gogo
2005	Als 't maar beweegt
2007	Debby & Nancy's Happy hour

== Theater ==
Year	Name	Notes
1984	De Straat	
1986	Droomspel	
1989	De meeuw	
1991	Wilde Lea	
1993	All for love	
1993	Joko	
2002	De krippel	
2002	Bloedarm	
2006	Licht aan! A.U.B.	
2010-2011	Oliver!	Musical
2017	Risjaar Drei	
2023	Red Star Line	Musical (Studio 100)
