= Dis-moi que l'amour... =

Single by Marc Lavoine

from the album Olympia Deuxmilletrois
- Language: French
- English title: "Tell Me That Love"
- B-side: "Passent les nuages (Live Olympia)"
- Released: 20 June 2003
- Recorded: January 2003
- Studio: Studio Mega (Suresnes)
- Genre: French pop; chanson; synth-pop
- Length: 3:18
- Label: Universal
- Lyricists: Jean-François Berger; Marc Lavoine
- Producers: François Delabrière; Jean-François Berger; Marc Lavoine

Marc Lavoine singles chronology
"J’écris des chansons" (2000)	"Dis-moi que l'amour..." (2003)	"Je me sens si seul" (2005)

"Dis-moi que l'amour..." (English: "Tell Me That Love") is a song by French singer Marc Lavoine, released on 20 June 2003, as the lead and only single from his live album Olympia Deuxmilletrois (2003), through Universal. The track is a duet with singer Bambou and was written by Marc Lavoine and Jean-François Berger. Production was handled by Lavoine, Berger, and François Delabrière. The song explores themes of romantic longing and the desire for enduring love.

Upon its release, "Dis-moi que l'amour" experienced significant commercial success in various European markets. In France, the single reached a peak position of No. 4 on the French Singles Chart and remained there for 30 weeks, making it one of Marc Lavoine's longest-charting and most successful singles in the country. In Belgium (Wallonia), it achieved a peak of No. 14 on the Ultratop 50 Singles chart, staying on the chart for 17 weeks and earning a spot at No. 80 on the region's year-end singles chart for 2003. The song also performed well in Switzerland, where it peaked at No. 38 on the Schweizer Hitparade and maintained a chart presence for 20 weeks—his most successful entry in that market.

== Background ==
Marc Lavoine's 2001 album Marc Lavoine was a commercial success, earning a 2× platinum certification in France for over 600,000 copies sold. The album features a blend of pop and adult contemporary music. Some notable tracks include the hit singles "Elle a les yeux revolver," which became one of his signature songs, and the duet "J'ai tout oublié" with Cristina Marocco. The album remained in the French Top 50 for 70 weeks and charted for a total of 96 weeks. The success of the album established Lavoine as one of France's most successful artists.

== Composition ==
"Dis-moi que l'amour" was recorded in 2003 and appears as the lead and only single from Marc Lavoine’s live album Olympia Deuxmilletrois. "Dis-moi que l'amour" was recorded at Studio Mega in Suresnes, France. The song was co-written by Marc Lavoine and Jean-François Berger, with production and arrangement handled by Lavoine, Berger, and François Delabrière. Musically, the track is a mid-tempo pop ballad, composed in the key of G♯ major with a tempo of approximately 130 beats per minute. Lyrically, "Dis-moi que l'amour" revolves around the desire for lasting affection and emotional security.

== Commercial performance ==
Upon its release, "Dis-moi que l'amour..." became one of Marc Lavoine's most commercially successful singles of the early 2000s, charting strongly in multiple European countries. In France, the song debuted within the top 10 and climbed to a peak position of No. 4 on the French Singles Chart (SNEP), where it remained for 30 weeks. This marked one of Lavoine’s longest-charting singles, bolstered by high rotation on national radio stations and strong physical sales. As of 2016, the single sold over 170,000 copies.

In Belgium (Wallonia), the song reached No. 14 on the Ultratop 50 Singles chart and holding a place in the rankings for 17 consecutive weeks. It was No. 80 on the Ultratop year-end chart for 2003. In Switzerland, "Dis-moi que l'amour" peaked at No. 38 on the Schweizer Hitparade and maintained a chart presence for 20 weeks—Lavoine's most successful single in that country to date.

=== Téléthon resurgence ===
In 2015, Marc Lavoine's 2003 single "Dis-moi que l'amour" experienced a significant resurgence when it was selected as the official anthem for France's 29th annual Téléthon, a major televised fundraising event supporting research into rare genetic diseases. As the event's patron, Lavoine chose the love ballad—originally a duet with Bambou—to reflect the spirit of the Téléthon. Lavoine arranged for proceeds from each digital download of "Dis-moi que l'amour" to be donated to the Association française contre les myopathies (AFM). The song was #1 on the iTunes France chart during the Téléthon weekend.

== Music video ==
The music video for "Dis-moi que l'amour...", a single by French singer Marc Lavoine, features a minimalist and atmospheric visual style that reflects the song’s introspective themes. Directed with a focus on simplicity and emotional resonance, the video follows Lavoine as he moves through a series of stark urban and interior settings, often depicted at night or in low light. The imagery is predominantly monochromatic.

== Track listing ==
All lyrics are written by Marc Lavoine, with music composed by Jean-François Berger.

CD Single
No.	Title	Length
1.	"Dis-moi que l'amour"	3:18
2.	"Passent les nuages (Live Olympia)"	4:03
Total length:		7:21

== Charts ==
=== Weekly charts ===
Weekly chart performance for "Dis-moi que l'amour..."
Chart (2003–2004)	Peak position
Belgium (Ultratop 50 Wallonia)	14
Europe (Eurochart Hot 100)	64
France (SNEP)	10
Switzerland (Schweizer Hitparade)	38

Chart (2015)	Peak position
France (SNEP)	4

=== Year-end charts ===
2003 year-end chart performance for "Dis-moi que l'amour..."
Chart (2003)	Position
Belgium (Ultratop 50 Wallonia)	80
France (SNEP)	46

== Certifications and sales ==
Regional certifications
Region	Certification	Certified units/sales
France (SNEP)	————	170,000

== Personnel ==
Credits adapted from Dis-moi que l'amour liner notes.

- Producer – Marc Lavoine (tracks: 1)
- Producer, Arranged By – Jean-François Berger (tracks: 1)
- Producer, Recorded By – François Delabrière (tracks: 1)
