= Les Duos de Marc =

Greatest hits album by Marc Lavoine
- Released: October 2007
- Recorded: 1987–2007
- Genre: Pop
- Label: Mercury, Universal Music

Marc Lavoine chronology
L'Heure d'été (2005)	Les Duos de Marc (2007)	La Collection de Marc (2007)

Singles from Les Duos de Marc
- 1. "J'ai confiance en toi (Mi fido di te)" Released: April 2007; 2. "Un ami" Released: November 2007

Les Duos de Marc is a 2007 compilation recorded by French artist Marc Lavoine. This album is a best of containing all the singer's duets recorded throughout his career, since 1985. Released on October 22, 2007, at the same of Lavoine's other best of Les Solos de Marc, the album was very successful in France, where it topped the chart for two weeks, and in Belgium (Wallonia), where it reached the top two.

== Releases ==
Date	Label	Country	Format	Catalog
October 22, 2007	Universal Music	Belgium, France, Switzerland	CD	53020944
February 27, 2008	Universal Music	Belgium, France, Switzerland	Slidepack CD	5305971

== Track listings ==
1. "Qu'est-ce que t'es belle" (Aboulker, Lavoine, Mithois) (with Catherine Ringer) — 3:56
2. "Une nuit sur son épaule" (Sanson) (with Véronique Sanson) — 3:33
3. "Les hommes sont des femmes comme les autres" (Arnault, Lavoine, Mithois) (with Princess Erika) — 4:13
4. "Adieu Camille" (Bernheim, DeMusset) (with Julie Depardieu) — 3:43
5. "J'ai tout oublié (Lavoine, Lunghini) (with Cristina Marocco) — 3:46
6. "Je ne veux qu'elle" (Kapler, Lavoine) (with Claire Keim) — 3:58
7. "Paris" (Aboulker, Lavoine) (with Souad Massi) — 5:03
8. "Chère amie (toutes mes excuses)" (Aboulker, Lavoine) (with Françoise Hardy) — 3:37
9. "Dis-moi que l'amour" (Berger, Lavoine) (with Bamboo) — 2:54
10. "J'espère" (Grillet, Lavoine) (with Quynh Anh) — 3:49
11. "J'ai confiance en toi (Mi fido di te)" (Cherubini, Lavoine, Onori) (with Jovanotti) — 3:36
12. "Un Ami" (Lavoine, Rodde) (with Florent Pagny) — 3:56
13. "Désolé" (Darc, Lo) (with Jennifer Ayache) — 4:14
14. "Nuits de Chine" (Benech, Dumont) (with Bamboo) — 3:36

Source : Allmusic.

== Certifications ==
Country	Certification	Date	Sales certified
Belgium	Gold	January 12, 2007	15,000

== Charts ==
Chart (1995)	Peak position
Belgian (Wallonia) Albums Chart	2
French SNEP Compilations Chart	1
Swiss Albums Chart	42

End of year chart (2007)	Position
Belgian (Wallonia) Albums Chart	42
