= Toi mon amour =

Single by Marc Lavoine

from the album L'Heure d'été
- Language: French
- Released: 9 January 2006
- Studio: Abbey Road Studios (London); Studio Gang (Paris); Studio Guillaume Tell (Suresnes); Studio Méga D (Suresnes)
- Length: 3:38
- Label: Mercury Records France; Universal
- Lyricists: Marc Lavoine; Christophe Casanave
- Producers: Marc Lavoine; Jean-François Berger; François Delabrière

Marc Lavoine singles chronology
"Je me sens si seul" (2005)	"Toi mon amour" (2006)

"Toi mon amour" (English: You, My Love) is a song by French singer Marc Lavoine, released on 9 January 2006 as part of his ninth studio album, L'Heure d'été (2005), through Universal Music Group and Mercury Records France. The track was written by Marc Lavoine and Christophe Casanave, with production handled by Jean-Francois Berger, François Delabrière, and Lavoine himself.

In France, the single peaked at No. 8 on the French Singles Chart (SNEP). In Belgium (Wallonia), it reached No. 10 on the Ultratop 50 Singles chart and was included in the year-end chart for 2006 at position No. 73. In Switzerland, the track peaked at No. 43 on the Schweizer Hitparade and spent a total of 10 weeks on the chart.

== Background and composition ==
Marc Lavoine's 2001 album Marc Lavoine was a major commercial success, earning a 2× platinum certification in France for over 600,000 copies sold. The album features a blend of pop and adult contemporary music, showcasing Lavoine's emotional vocal delivery and strong songwriting. Some notable tracks include the hit singles "Elle a les yeux revolver," which became one of his signature songs, and the duet "J'ai tout oublié" with Cristina Marocco, which further solidified his popularity. The album remained in the French Top 50 for 70 weeks and charted for a total of 96 weeks.

"Toi mon amour" was written by Marc Lavoine and Christophe Casanave, with the music composed by Casanave. The song was produced by Marc Lavoine, Jean-François Berger, and François Delabrière, who also contributed to the arrangements and overall production on Lavoine's ninth studio album L'Heure d'été. The track was recorded in various studios, with notable work taking place at Studios de la Grande Armée in Paris, a prominent studio for French pop music. The song's lyrics revolve around themes of romantic devotion, emotional vulnerability, and the longing for connection, capturing the complexities of love and desire. Musically, "Toi mon amour" features a smooth pop ballad arrangement, with subtle soft rock influences. It is written in the key of D minor, with a tempo (BPM) of 97.

== Commercial performance ==
Upon release, "Toi mon amour" experienced moderate commercial performance in various European countries. In France, the single climbed to No. 8 on the French Singles Chart (SNEP), ranking among Marc Lavoine's more notable chart successes. It remained on the chart for several weeks. In Belgium (Wallonia), it secured the No. 10 spot on the Ultratop 50 Singles chart, and appeared on the 2006 year-end chart at No. 73. In Switzerland, the song reached No. 43 on the Schweizer Hitparade and charted for 10 weeks.

== Music video ==
"Toi mon amour" is a French ballad in which Marc Lavoine sings about love and emotional connection. The lyrics describe feelings of affection, longing, and devotion, with the narrator addressing his partner as "my love." The music video for "Toi mon amour" features Marc Lavoine and actress Zoé Félix in a series of black-and-white visuals. The video focuses on intimate, close-up shots of the two performers, with an emphasis on their emotional expressions. The aesthetic is minimalist and subdued, reflecting the song's mood. Rather than following a specific narrative, the video centers on portraying the emotional atmosphere of the song through its visuals.

== Track listing ==
All tracks are written by Marc Lavoine, Christophe Cazenave and Jean-François Berger.

CD Single
No.	Title	Length
1.	"Toi mon amour"	3:38
2.	"On est passé à l heure d été"	3:07
Total length:		6:45

== Charts ==
=== Weekly charts ===
Weekly chart performance for "Toi mon amour"
Chart (2006)	Peak position
French Singles Chart (SNEP)	8
Belgian (Wallonia) Singles Chart (Ultratop)	10
Swiss Singles Chart (Schweizer Hitparade)	43

=== Year-end charts ===
2006 year-end chart performance for "Toi mon amour"
Chart (2006)	Peak position
Belgian (Wallonia) Singles Chart (Ultratop)	73

== Certifications and sales ==
Region	Certification	Certified units/sales
France (SNEP)	—————	110,000

== Personnel ==
- Record Company – Universal Music France
- Published by Les Editions Du 44
- Published by Scorpio Music
- Designed at Barilla.design
- Made by Cinram
