= L'Heure d'été (album) =

Studio album by Marc Lavoine
- Released: May 23, 2005
- Recorded: 2004–2005
- Studio: Abbey Road Studios, London; Studio Gang, Paris; Studio Guillaume Tell, Suresnes; Studio Méga D, Suresnes
- Genre: Pop
- Label: Mercury France, Universal
- Producer: Jean-François Berger; François Delabrière; Marc Lavoine

Marc Lavoine chronology
Olympia Deuxmilletrois (2003)	L'Heure d'été (2005)	Les Duos de Marc (2007)

Singles from Marc Lavoine
- 1. "Je me sens si seul" Released: July 4, 2005; 2. "Toi mon amour" Released: January 9, 2006; 3. "Tu m'as renversé" Released: 2006; 4. "J'espère" Released: 2006

L'Heure d'été is a 2005 album recorded by French artist Marc Lavoine. It was his ninth studio album and his 12th album overall. Released on May 23, 2005, it was successful in the francophone countries.

== Content ==
L'Heure d'été provided two hit singles : "Je me sens si seul" (#16 in France) and "Toi mon amour" (#8 in France). "Tu m'as renversé" and "J'espère", a duet with Belgium singer of Vietnamese descent Quynh Anh, were just released as promotional singles.

In France, the album started at No. 3, its peak position, on May 28, 2005, before dropping slowly on the chart the weeks later. It managed to stay for nine weeks in the top ten, 63 weeks in the top 50 and 91 weeks on the chart (top 200). In Belgium (Wallonia), the album was ranked for 49 weeks. It entered the Ultratop 40 at No. 7 on June 4, 2005, and reached No. 2 two weeks later and for two consecutive weeks. It totaled 12 weeks in the top ten.

== Releases ==
Date	Label	Country	Format	Catalog
2005	Universal	Belgium, France, Switzerland	CD	98299
2005	Mercury	Belgium, France, Switzerland	CD	9829953
2006	Universal	Belgium, France, Switzerland	CD	982992
2006	Universal	Belgium, France, Switzerland	CD	9835706
2006	Universal	Belgium, France, Switzerland	CD	9844586

== Track listing ==
CD

No.	Title	Lyrics	Music	Length
1.	"Toi mon amour"	Marc Lavoine	Christophe Casanave	3:35
2.	"Je me sens si seul"	Marc Lavoine	Jean-François Berger, Marc Lavoine	3:05
3.	"Tu m'as renversé"	Pierre Grillet	Marc Lavoine	2:32
4.	"La Mélancolie"	Marc Lavoine	Marc Ricci, Pierre Zito	3:16
5.	"Ne m'en veux pas de t'en vouloir"	Daniel Darc	Frédéric Lo	3:37
6.	"Vogue le magazine"	Marc Lavoine	Jean-François Berger, Marc Lavoine	3:36
7.	"J'espère" (duet with Quynh Anh)	Pierre Grillet	Marc Lavoine	3:50
8.	"On a cru"	Marc Esposito	Marc Lavoine	3:07
9.	"Tous les jours"	Yvan Coriat, Marc Lavoine	Marc Lavoine, Marc Ricci, Pierre Zito	3:39
10.	"Doucement rock'n'roll"	Marc Lavoine	Jean-François Berger, Marc Lavoine	3:29
11.	"On est passé à l'heure d'été"	Marc Lavoine	Jean-François Berger, Marc Lavoine	3:06
12.	"Les Papillons"	Marc Lavoine	Pascal Rodde	4:26
13.	"J'ai oublié de te dire"	Marc Lavoine	Hervé Larribe	4:16

+

DVD

1. "Je me sens si seul" (music video)
2. "Toi mon amour" (music video)
3. "Tu m'as renversé" (music video)

Source : Allmusic.

== Personnel ==
- Barilla – design
- Denis Benarrosh – percussion
- Jean-François Berger – electric guitar, Fender Rhodes, harmonica, keyboards, Korg MS-20, mandolin, piano, programming, string arrangement & conducting, trumpet & Wurlitzer
- Jean-Pierre Bucolo – acoustic guitar & electric guitar
- Clarisse Canteloube – front cover & inside photography
- Christophe Deschamps – drums
- Martin Jenkins – keyboards, programming
- Claire Keim – backing vocals
- Peter Lale – cello
- Marc Lavoine – lead vocals & backing vocals
- Sandrine Le Bars – executive producer
- Jean-Marc Lubrano – inside photography
- David Maurin – drums
- François Poggio – acoustic guitar
- Nick Rodwell – clarinet
- Philippe Russo – electric guitar
- Éric Sauviat – acoustic guitar & dobro
- Matthew Vaughan – programming
- Laurent Vernerey – bass guitar
- Gavyn Wright – concertmaster

- Artistic direction – Egidio Alves-Martins
  - Assistant & artistic coordination – Thomas Sandoval
- Engineered by François Delabrière
  - Assistants – Denis Caribaux (Studio Guillaume Tell), Florian Lagatta (Studio Gang) & Valéry Pellegrini (Studio Méga D)
- Mixed by François Delabrière at Studio Méga
  - Assistant – Éric Uzan
- Mastered by George Marino at Sterling Sound, New York City

== Charts ==
=== Weekly charts ===
Chart (2005–2007)	Peak position
Belgian (Wallonia) Albums Chart	2
French SNEP Albums Chart	3
Swiss Albums Chart	23

=== Year-end charts ===
Chart (2005)	Position
Belgian Albums (Ultratop 50 Wallonia)	14
French Albums (SNEP)	13

Chart (2006)	Position
Belgian Albums (Ultratop 50 Wallonia)	65
French Albums (SNEP)	35

== Certifications and sales ==
Country	Certification	Date	Sales certified	Physical sales
Belgium	Gold		25,000	
France	2 x Gold	December 14, 2005	200,000	507,000
