= Je ne veux qu'elle =

Single by Marc Lavoine and Claire Keim

from the album Marc Lavoine
- B-side: "N'oublie jamais"
- Released: November 2002
- Recorded: 2001
- Genre: Pop
- Length: 3:58
- Label: Mercury Records, Universal Music
- Songwriters: Marc Lavoine, J. Kapler
- Producers: Marc Lavoine, Jean-François Berger, François Delabrière

Marc Lavoine singles chronology
"J'aurais voulu" (2002)	"Je ne veux qu'elle" (2002)	"Dis-moi que l'amour" (2003)

"Je ne veux qu'elle" is a 2002 pop song recorded by French singer Marc Lavoine as a duet with actress Claire Keim. It was the fourth and last single off his eighth studio album Marc Lavoine and was released in November 2002. It was a top ten single in France and was also a hit in Belgium (Wallonia) and Switzerland.

== Song information ==
The song was co-written by J. Kapler, Jean-Jacques Goldman's brother and Marc Lavoine and composed by J. Kapler, and helped launch the career of Claire Keim, who was mostly unknown before this duet. Both singers performed the song during Lavoine's 2003 tour and their live version is available on the album Olympia Deuxmilletrois. The song is also included on Lavoine's best of Les Duos de Marc and La collection de Marc, both released in 2007.

The song was covered by Gérard Darmon and Julie Zenatti for Les Enfoirés' 2006 album Le Village des Enfoirés and included in a medley named "Medley Séduction".

In France, the single went straight to a peak of No. 9 on 9 November 2002, thus becoming Lavoine's third top ten hit in the SNEP chart. It then dropped and remained for 17 weeks in the top 50 and 23 weeks in the top 100. In Belgium (Wallonia), the single was ranked for 16 weeks on the Ultratop 50 and reached No. 14 in its second week, on 23 November 2002. In Switzerland, the song peaked at No. 34 on 12 January 2003 and stayed in the top 100 for 15 weeks.

In 2002, "Je ne veux qu'elle" was the 63rd most aired song on radio in France, and the music video was the 127th most broadcast on television.

== Track listings ==
CD single

No.	Title	Length
1.	"Je ne veux qu'elle"	4:03
2.	"N'oublie jamais" (by Marc Lavoine)	4:12

Digital download (since 2005)

No.	Title	Length
1.	"Je ne veux qu'elle"	3:58
2.	"Je ne veux qu'elle" (2003 live version)	5:03

== Credits ==
- Arrangements and direction of strings : Jean-François Berger
- Artistic direction : Egidio Alves Martins
- Acoustic guitar : Hugh Burns
- Bass : Laurent Vernerey
- Dobro : Jean-Pierre Bucolo
- Electric guitar : Philippe Russo
- First violin : Perry Montague-Mason
- Strings : Isabel Griffiths
- Assistant : Thomas Sandoval
- Programmations : Mathew Vaughan
- Recorded by François Delabrière
- Mixed by François Delabrière at Mega studio
- Mastering @ Metropolis by Ian Cooper
- Produced by François Delabrière, Jean-François Berger and Marc Lavoine

== Charts ==
=== Weekly charts ===
Chart (2002)	Peak position
Belgian (Wallonia) Singles Chart	14
French SNEP Singles Chart	9
Swiss Singles Chart	34

=== Year-end charts ===
Chart (2002)	Position
French Singles Chart	92
