= Jean-Louis Sbille =

Belgian radio producer (1948–2026)

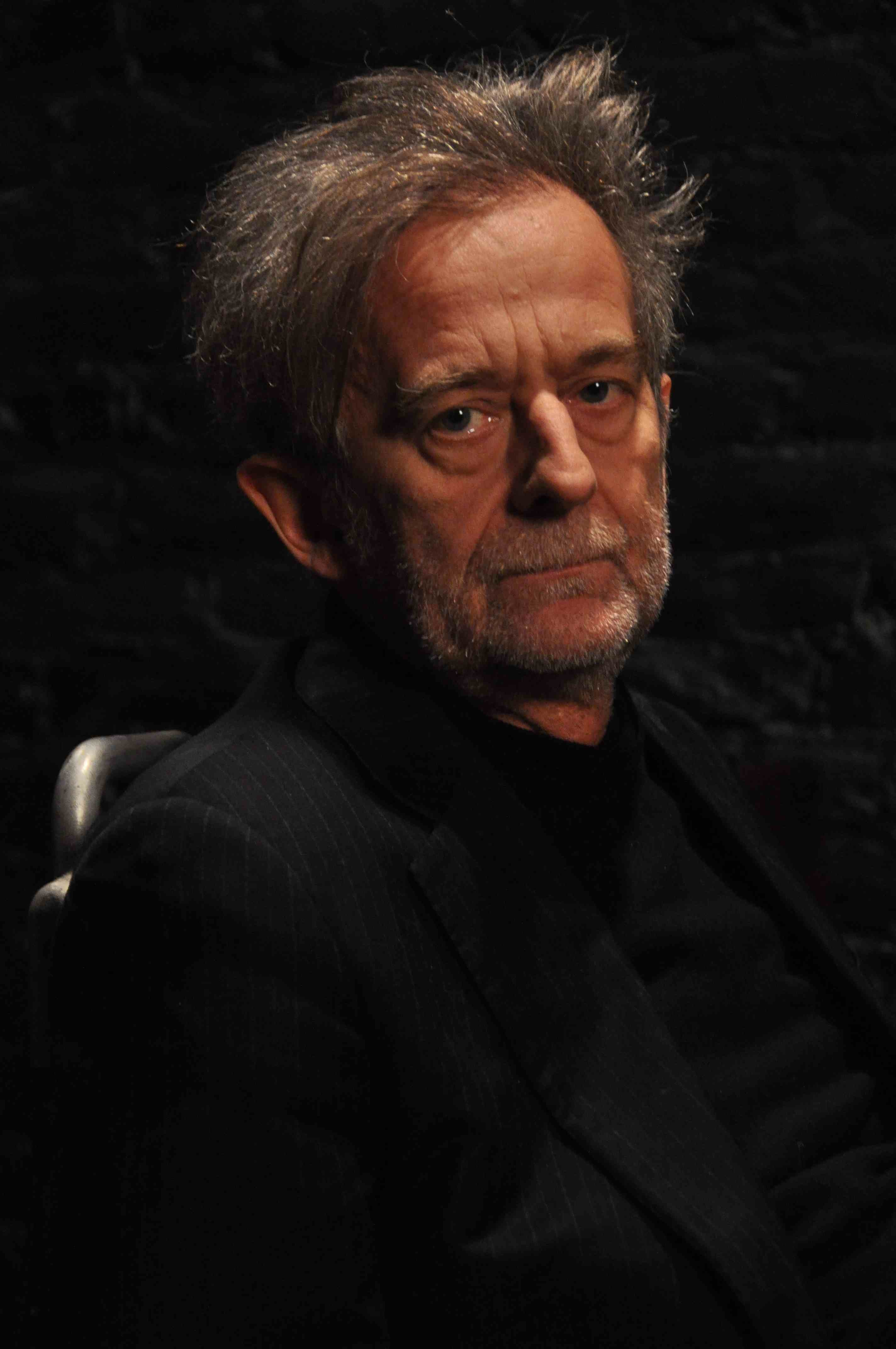
- Born: 14 March 1948; Ottignies, Belgium
- Died: 14 November 2026 (aged 78); Brussels, Belgium
- Years active: 1974–2026
- Website: www.sbille.net

Jean-Louis Sbille (14 March 1948 – 14 November 2026) was a Belgian French-speaking artist, radio and television producer, actor and writer.

== Life and career ==
In the mid-70s, with the graphic designer and art director, Marc Borgers they created RUPTZ, an art video and performance group. From 1977 to 1981 he published the new wave art magazine Soldes Fins de Séries. He published novels for youth, poetry, dramatic works and screenplays for television Ici Bla Bla.

Sbille produced cultural, musical and youth radio and television shows on RTBF, the French-speaking Belgian radio and television organisation. He worked in Brussels with the Mexican choreographer José Besprosvany from 2003 to 2009 as a dramatist.

He was also a professor of media criticism at the Haute Ecole Libre de Bruxelles Ilya Prigogine.

Sbille died on 14 November 2026, at the age of 78.

== Filmography ==
Year	Title	Role	Director	Notes
1988	The Music Teacher	Critic	Gérard Corbiau	
1989	Wait Until Spring, Bandini	Bank Employee	Dominique Deruddere	
1989	Blueberry Hill	Teacher	Robbe De Hert	
1989	L'homme de terre		Boris Lehman	
1989	Le retour d'Arsène Lupin		Michel Boisrond	TV series (1 episode)
1992	Maigret	Vadot	Serge Leroy	TV series (1 episode)
1992	Carré d'as		Marc Lobet	TV series (1 episode)
1993	Embrasse-moi vite !		Gérard Marx	TV movie
1993	Nestor Burma		Maurice Frydland	TV series (1 episode)
1994	Mina Tannenbaum		Martine Dugowson	
1996	Les Steenfort, maîtres de l'orge		Jean-Daniel Verhaeghe	TV mini-series
1996	Le R.I.F.	The photographer	Teff Erhat	TV series (1 episode)
1998	La carte postale		Vivian Goffette	Short
2000	Le Roi danse	Spectator	Gérard Corbiau (2)	
2001	L'étrange Monsieur Joseph	Marcel Joanovici	Josée Dayan	TV movie
2003	Je ne peux pas t'aider	The grandfather	Rachel Lecomte	Short
2004	Du côté de chez Marcel	The mayor	Dominique Ladoge	TV movie
2005	Croit		Fabrice Couchard	Short
2005	Le piège du Père Noël	Drag-queen	Christian Faure	TV movie
2006	Le Lièvre de Vatanen	Aaron	Marc Rivière	
2006	Bataille natale	The priest	Anne Deluz	TV movie
2007	Septième ciel Belgique	Mr Neville	Luc Boland & André Chandelle	TV series (2 episodes)
2009	The Vintner's Luck	Henri	Niki Caro	
2009	Légende de Jean l'Inversé		Philippe Lamensch & Françoise Duelz	Short
2011	La Chance de ma vie	M. Mexès	Nicolas Cuche	
2011	Moi, Michel G., milliardaire, maître du monde	Marc Boubil	Stéphane Kazandjian	
2011	Les tribulations d'une caissière	The homeless	Pierre Rambaldi	
2011	Il n'y a pas sans toi	The trader	Christophe Johanns	Short
2011	About a Spoon	Mister Rico	Philippe Lamensch (2)	Short
2012	The Hot Potato	Ernst Koppel	Tim Lewiston	
2012	La solitude du pouvoir	The deputy	Josée Dayan (2)	
2012	Regards		Paolo Zagaglia	
2012	Clan	Pierre	Nathalie Basteyns & Kaat Beels	TV series (1 episode)
2013	A Promise	Hans	Patrice Leconte	
2013	Before the Winter Chill	Fred	Philippe Claudel	
2013	Angélique	The priest	Ariel Zeitoun	
2013	Landes	Deyris	François-Xavier Vives	
2013	Le petit bonhomme vert		Roland Lethem	Short
2013	Van Gogh; een huis voor Vincent	Monsieur Le Clerq	Pim van Hoeve	TV series (1 episode)
2014	Jacques a vu	Cardinal	Xavier Diskeuve	
2014	Les pencheurs		Jan Boon	Short
2014	Typique	The doctor	Lionel Delhaye, Jérôme Dernovoi & Benjamin Torrini	TV mini-series
2014	Léo Matteï, Brigade des Mineurs	The driver	David Morlet	TV series (1 episode)
2015	Soirée à la Girafe	Valdeburgo	Pim Dinghs	Short
2015	Who's in the Fridge ?		Philippe Lamensch (3)	Short
2015	Chefs	The notary	Arnaud Malherbe	TV series (1 episode)
2016	Raw	The professor	Julia Ducournau	
2016	Caffè	Robert	Cristiano Bortone	
2016	Au-delà des Murs	The man in the crowd	Hervé Hadmar	TV mini-series
2017	This Is Our Land	Monsieur Biagi	Lucas Belvaux	
2017	Above the Law	Minister Van Bollen	François Troukens, Jean-François Hensgens	
2018	Les Misérables	Gorbeau beggar	Tom Shankland	TV mini-series (1 episode)

== Works ==
=== Poetry ===
- Flip Inégral (Illustrated by André Lambotte) 1974.
- Faustine Surface (Photographs by Marc Borgers) 1976.
- Mamamama (Illustrated by Michèle Baczynsky) 2012.

=== Albums and novels for youth ===
- The Castle That Had Hiccups (Illustrated by Dominique Maes) 2000.
- La table, les trois chaises et le petit tabouret (illustrated by Dominique Maes) 2002.
- Les Camions De La Peur 2005.
- Golfo 2012.

=== Screenplays ===
- Le nid de l'aigle 2004
- Uncle Logic &... 2005
- Patatras et Vnudlaba 2007
- Monologue de Machine à Laver 2010
- Poings Perdus 2012
