= 10 ans de succès =

10 ans de succès (French: "10 years of success") may refer to:

- 10 ans de succès (Marc Lavoine album)
- 10 ans de succès, Bembeya Jazz National (2010)
- Tu trouveras... 10 ans de succès (Best of), by Canadian singer Natasha St-Pier
- Aimer, 10 ans de succès, a 1983 album by the French singer-songwriter Frédéric François
