= Bonjour Vietnam =

Single by Quynh Anh

from the album Bonjour Vietnam
- Released: January 2006
- Length: 3:05
- Label: Universal
- Songwriters: Marc Lavoine; Yvan Coriat

"Bonjour Vietnam" is a song composed by Marc Lavoine, co-written by Lavoine and Yvan Coriat, and recorded by Vietnamese-Belgian singer Quynh Anh. Lavoine said he was impressed by Quynh Anh's charm and talent as well as being touched by the feeling of a young girl who had never seen her homeland, so he wrote the song as a gift for her. The content of the song is about the longing of an overseas Vietnamese for her homeland.

== Popularity ==
The song received favorable acclaim from Vietnamese communities, both at home and abroad as well as from the francophone community. Thúy Nga Productions featured the song in several shows for overseas Vietnamese all over the world. By 2008, due to its popularity, the song was translated into English by Guy Balbaert with the name "Hello Vietnam" (not to be confused with the song "Hello Vietnam" written by Tom T. Hall and recorded by American country music singer Johnnie Wright in 1965). In May 2008, Quynh Anh made a special appearance singing the song "Hello Vietnam" in Thúy Nga's Paris By Night 92 show. Later, Quynh Anh released the single "Hello Vietnam".
