= Ève de Castro =

French writer

Valérie Cazeneuve called Ève de Castro (1961) is a French writer, novelist and screenwriter, a winner of the Prix des libraires in 1992, the Prix des Deux Magots and the Prix Maurice Genevoix in 1996.

== Work ==
=== Novels ===
- 1987: Les Bâtards du soleil, éditions Orban
- 1991: La Galigaï, éditions Orban
- 1992: Ayez pitié du cœur des hommes, éditions Jean-Claude Lattès – Prix des libraires
- 1994: Soleils amers, éditions Jean-Claude Lattès
- 1996: Nous serons comme des dieux, Albin Michel – Prix des Deux Magots and Prix Maurice Genevoix
- 1998: Le Soir et le Matin suivant, éditions Albin Michel
- 2001: Le Peseur d'âme, éditions Albin Michel
- 2006: La Trahison de l'ange, éditions Robert Laffont
- 2010: Cet homme-là, éditions Robert Laffont
- 2012: Le Roi des ombres, éditions Robert Laffont – Grand prix littéraire of the Académie nationale de pharmacie (2013)
- 2013: Enfant roi, Plon
- 2014: Joujou, éditions Robert Laffont
- 2015: Nous, Louis, roi, éditions L'Iconoclaste

=== Scripts ===
- 2000: Le Roi danse by Gérard Corbiau (in collaboration with Gérard and Andrée Corbiau)
- 2001: Rastignac ou les Ambitieux (TV) by Alain Tasma (in collaboration with Natalie Carter)
- 2010: L'École du pouvoir (TV) by Raoul Peck (in collaboration with Didier Lacoste)
- 2011: Fort comme la mort (TV) by Gilles Banier
