= Olympia Deuxmilletrois =

Les Amours du dimanche

Live album by Marc Lavoine
- Released: May 27, 2003
- Recorded: France
- Venue: Olympia, Paris
- Genre: Pop
- Label: Mercury, Universal Music

Marc Lavoine chronology
| Marc Lavoine (2001) | Les Amours du dimanche (2003) | L'Heure d'été (2005) |

Singles from Olympia Deuxmilletrois
- 1. "Dis-moi que l'amour..." Released: June 2003

Olympia Deuxmilletrois is a 2003 album by French singer Marc Lavoine. This live album, recorded on January 24 and 25, 2003, at the Olympia (Paris) during the singer's concerts series, was his eleventh album overall and was released on May 27, 2003. The album reached the top 15 in France and Belgium (Wallonia). "Dis-moi que l'amour..." was the sole single from the album, and became a hit in France (#10).

== Track listing ==
1. "Dis-moi que l'amour..." (Berger / Lavoine) (duet with Bamboo) — 2:54
2. "Le Pont Mirabeau" (Apollinaire / Lavoine) — 4:00
3. "Passent les nuages" (Duvall / Momont) — 3:54
4. "Les Tournesols" (Coeurlot / Lavoine) — 3:54
5. "Elle a les yeux revolver..." (Aboulker / Lavoine) — 3:57
6. "Je ne veux qu'elle" (Kapler / Lavoine) (duet with Claire Keim) — 5:02
7. "C'est ça la France" (Arnault / Lavoine) — 4:34
8. "Javanaise Remake" (Gainsbourg) — 5:12
9. "J'aurais voulu" (Esposito, Friedrich / Lavoine) — 4:05
10. "C'est la vie" (Aboulker / Lavoine) — 4:34
11. "Paris" (Aboulker / Lavoine) (duet with Souad Massi) — 6:24
12. "N'oublie jamais" (Lavoine / Musumarra) — 4:04
13. "Rue Fontaine" (Aboulker / Lavoine) — 4:10
14. "J'ai tout oublié" (Lavoine / Lunghini) (duet with Cristina Marocco) — 5:19
15. "Le monde est tellement con" (Aboulker / Lavoine) — 5:01
16. "Qu'est-ce que t'es belle" (Aboulker / Lavoine, Mithois) — 6:07
17. "Sittin' on the Dock of the Bay" (Redding / Scopper) (duet with Tcheky Karyo) — 3:14
18. "Pour une giguine avec toi" (Aboulker / Lavoine) — 3:11
19. "Le Parking des anges" (Aboulker / Lavoine) — 5:51
20. "Chère Amie" (Aboulker / Lavoine) — 4:28
21. "J'écris des chansons" (Goldman / Lavoine) — 5:39

Source : Allmusic.

== Releases ==
| Date | Label | Country | Format | Catalog |
|---|---|---|---|---|
| 2003 | Universal | Belgium, France, Switzerland | CD | 773452 |

== Certifications and sales ==
| Country | Certification | Date | Sales certified | Physical sales |
|---|---|---|---|---|
| France | Gold | December 18, 2003 | 100,000 | 112,000 |

== Charts ==
| Chart (2003) | Peak position |
|---|---|
| Belgian (Wallonia) Albums Chart | 14 |
| French SNEP Albums Chart | 13 |
| Swiss Albums Chart | 81 |

| End of year chart (2003) | Position |
|---|---|
| French Albums Chart | 96 |
