= Marc Lavoine (album) =

Studio album by Marc Lavoine
- Released: November 27, 2001
- Recorded: Angel Recording Studios, London; Studio Ferber, Paris; Studio Guillaume Tell, Suresnes; Studio Méga, Suresnes; Olympic Studios, London
- Genre: Pop
- Labels: Mercury France, Universal
- Producers: Jean-François Berger; François Delabrière; Marc Lavoine

Marc Lavoine chronology
C'est ça Lavoine (2001)	Marc Lavoine (2001)	Olympia Deuxmilletrois (2003)

Singles from Marc Lavoine
- 1. "Le pont Mirabeau" Released: June 2001; 2. "J'ai tout oublié" Released: November 2001; 3. "J'aurais voulu" Released: May 2002; 4. "Je ne veux qu'elle" Released: November 2002

Marc Lavoine is a 2001 album recorded by French singer-songwriter and actor Marc Lavoine. It was released on November 27, 2001, and even if it failed to reach the top ten, it achieved success in France and Belgium (Wallonia), where it remained charted respectively for two and one years.

== Background ==
This album was composed of new songs and singer's old songs overdubbed as duets, such as "Chère amie (toutes mes excuses)" and "Paris". Lavoine's 1984 hit single "Elle a les yeux revolver" was also included as hidden track in a slower version. "Mucho embrasse-moi" is a cover version of Dalida's hit "Bésame Mucho", with other lyrics. 1980s singers and musicians Philippe Russo, Alain Lanty and Christophe Deschamps participated in the recording of the album.

The album provided four singles, included two top ten hits (two duets of the album : "J'ai tout oublié", with Cristina Marocco, and "Je ne veux qu'elle", with Claire Keim) and allowed Lavoine to obtain his first number-one hit. The other two singles, "Le Pont Mirabeau" and "J'aurais voulu", flopped, failing the top 50 in France.

In France, the album started at No. 13 on October 13, 2001. It peaked at No. 11 in its 19th week and remained for 70 weeks in the top 50 and 96 weeks on the chart (top 150). It was eventually certified Double Platinum by the SNEP, the French provider. After leaving the albums chart, it topped the Top Mid'Price / Back Catalogue for four weeks.

== Release history ==
Date	Label	Country	Format	Catalog
November 27, 2001	Universal	Belgium, France, Switzerland	CD	586208
November 27, 2001	Polygram	Belgium, France, Switzerland	CD	5862082
2006	Universal	Belgium, France, Switzerland	CD	9830339

== Track listings ==
1. "Le Pont Mirabeau" (Guillaume Apollinaire, Marc Lavoine) – 3:18
2. "Passent les nuages" (Jacques Duvall, Frédéric Momont) – 3:43
3. "J'aurais voulu" (Marc Esposito, Marc Lavoine, Bedřich Smetana) – 4:27
4. "Je ne veux qu'elle" (J. Kapler, Marc Lavoine) (duet with Claire Keim) – 3:58
5. "Mucho embrasse-moi" (Consuelo Velázquez, adapt. Marc Lavoine) – 4:17
6. "Chère amie (toutes mes excuses)" (Fabrice Aboulker, Marc Lavoine) (duet with Françoise Hardy) – 3:37
7. "N'oublie jamais" (Marc Lavoine, Romano Musumarra) – 4:09
8. "Paris" (Fabrice Aboulker, Marc Lavoine) (duet with Souad Massi) – 5:03
9. "Deux Guitares au soleil" (Marc Lavoine, Romano Musumarra) – 4:41
10. "Ma Jonque est jaune" (Jean Fauque, Marc Lavoine) – 3:28
11. "J'ai tout oublié" (Marc Lavoine, Georges Lunghini) (duet with Cristina Marocco) – 4:05
12. "Ma solitude.com" (Marc Lavoine, Richard Mortier) – 2:45
13. "Elle a les yeux revolver..." (Fabrice Aboulker, Marc Lavoine) (hidden track) – 5:38

Source : Allmusic

== Credits ==
Musicians

- Drums : Christophe Deschamps (tracks 1,2,9), Regis Ceccarelli (track 7)
- Bass : Laurent Vernerey (tracks 1,2,4,9)
- Piano : Jean-François Berger (tracks 1,10), Alain Lanty (track 5,6)
- Keyboards : Jean-François Berger (track 1,5,8)
- Guitar : Jean-François Berger (track 1,5), Victor (tracks 3), Jean-François Kellner (track 8), Dominic Miller (track 9)
  - Acoustic guitar : Franck Amseli (track 2), Hugh Burns (track 4), Jean-Pierre Bucolo (track 10)
  - Electric guitar : Philippe Russo (tracks 2,4), Victor (tracks 2,10)
- Programmations : Jean-François Berger (track 1,2,5,8,10,11), François Delabrière (tracks 2,8), Mathew Vaughan (tracks 3–5,9-11)
- Background vocals : Marc Lavoine (tracks 1,2), Claire Keim (tracks 2,11)
- Dobro : Jean-Pierre Bucolo (track 4)
- Trumpet : Jean-François Berger (track 5)
- First violin : Gavyn Wright (tracks 1,9,11), Perry Montague-Mason (tracks 2–5,10), Christophe Guiot (tracks 6,7)
- Percussion : Rabah Kahlfa (track 8)
- Double bass : Rémi Vignolo (track 7)
- Oud : Ahmed Djouhri (track 8)
- Accordion : Jean-François Berger (track 8)
- Arrangements : Souad Massi (track 8)
- Flute : Michel Gaucher (track 9)
- Buggle : Christian Martinez (track 9)
- Mellotron : Jean-François Berger (track 12)

Recording

- Engineered by François Delabrière
- Mixed by François Delabrière at Mega studio
- Mastered by Ian Cooper at Metropolis Mastering, London
- String arrangements and conducting : Jean-François Berger
- Produced by François Delabrière, Jean-François Berger and Marc Lavoine
- Strings contractors : Isobel Griffiths (tracks 1–5, 9–11), Christophe Guiot (tracks 6,7)
- Artistic direction : Egidio Alves Martins
  - Assistant : Thomas Sandoval
- Made in the EU

== Certifications and sales ==
Country	Certification	Date	Sales certified	Physical sales
Belgium	Gold		25,000	
France	2 x Platinum	May 2003	600,000	644,000

== Charts ==
Chart (2001–2003)	Peak position
Belgian (Wallonia) Albums Chart	11
French SNEP Albums Chart	11
Swiss Albums Chart	62

End of year chart (2001)	Position
French Albums Chart	81
End of year chart (2002)	Position
Belgian (Wallonia) Singles Chart	34
French Albums Chart	26
End of year chart (2003)	Position
Belgian (Wallonia) Singles Chart	69
