= The Music Teacher (film) =

- English language poster
- Directed by: Gérard Corbiau
- Written by: Gérard Corbiau
- Starring: José van Dam; Anne Roussel; Philippe Volter; Sylvie Fennec; Patrick Bauchau
- Cinematography: Walther Vanden Ende
- Release date: May 1988 (Cannes)
- Running time: 99 minutes
- Country: Belgium
- Language: French

The Music Teacher (French: Le maître de musique) is a 1988 Belgian film directed and co-written by Gérard Corbiau. The film was nominated for the Academy Award for Best Foreign Language Film at the 61st Academy Awards.

== Plot ==
In the early 20th century, in London, after a concert, the famous opera singer Joachim Dallayrac shocks everyone by announcing his retirement from the stage at the height of his fame. Instead, he decides to focus on teaching Sophie, a young singer, much to the surprise and disappointment of critics. Meanwhile, his longtime rival Prince Scotti thrives, while Joachim's proteges, Sophie and Jean, excel under his guidance.

As time passes, Sophie develops feelings for Joachim, who remains devoted solely to his music. Despite their growing closeness, Joachim keeps his distance, knowing their relationship can't progress. However, circumstances lead them to participate in a singing competition at Scotti's castle, where Sophie and Jean shine. Meanwhile, Joachim dies unexpectedly.

Sophie's performance at the competition impresses everyone, including Scotti, who pits Jean against his own protege, Arcas, in a singing duel. Jean emerges victorious, and both he and Sophie are offered opportunities to further their careers. Amidst this success, they receive news of Joachim's death and reflect on their future without him.

== Cast ==
Actor	Role
José van Dam	Joachim Dallayrac
Anne Roussel	Sophie Maurier
Philippe Volter	Jean Nilson
Sylvie Fennec	Estelle Fischer
Patrick Bauchau	Prince Scotti
Johan Leysen	François Manssaux
Jean-Louis Sbille	Critic

== See also ==
- List of submissions to the 61st Academy Awards for Best Foreign Language Film
- List of Belgian submissions for the Academy Award for Best Foreign Language Film
