= The Awakening (French TV series) =

- Cover of the French edition of the DVD
- Created by: Joël Houssin
- Starring: Claire Keim; Guillaume Cramoisan; Boris Terral; Antoine Duléry; Arthur Jugnot
- Theme music composer: Didier Delaître
- Country of origin: France
- No. of episodes: 6

Production
- Producers: Denis Karvil; Pierre Roitfeld

Original release
- Network: M6
- Release: July 30 – August 13, 2009

The Awakening (French: Éternelle) is a French television miniseries. It was produced by Alizés Film (France) in a format of six episodes of 52 minutes, directed by Didier Delaître. It stars Claire Keim and was broadcast for the first time on M6 between July 30, 2009 and August 13, 2009 on prime time.

== Plot summary ==
On a rainy night, Yann Voline, a night doctor, crashes his SUV into a young naked woman. He takes her to the hospital, where it is discovered that she has no memory of her past or who she is, and that she is infected by an unknown bacteria. She refuses to be separated from the man who injured her, and she is a complete mystery for everybody, medical personnel and police. Yann discovers that she has strange powers such as mind reading, and she can appropriate the personality, memories and abilities of people she meets. She has also a kind of Sumerian birthmark on her left thigh.

== Cast ==
- Claire Keim : « She »
- Guillaume Cramoisan : Yann Voline
- Boris Terral : Christophe Morel
- Antoine Duléry : Lieutenant Gir
- Audrey Fleurot : Svetlana Jankova
- Serge Riaboukine : Shakin
- Arthur Jugnot : Martin
- Elsa Mollien : Karine
- Asil Rais : Ikshan

== Reception and distribution ==
The series was quite successful in France. It gathered 4 million viewers on the first night (19,6% market share), which is good in France for science fiction on prime time television. For the following episodes, the audience settled down at 2.5 million.

However, the series was cancelled after the sixth episode, ultimately leaving no explanation for the multiple mysteries introduced in the show, such as: who ultimately is the amnesiac woman “She”; how to stop the deadly plant "Jordanum"; who is the mysterious biker who follows "She"; what is Ikshan‘s actual mission; and where does the mysterious bacterium come from? There are also the following errors and inconsistencies in the series: Cronsdtadt is not in Ukraine, but is a naval base in St. Petersburg; Hecate is not an Egyptian goddess but Greek; and Sumerian writing was cuneiform and did not include the snakelike twist or triangle shown in the Sumerian ring.

The series is available on DVD in France and on Amazon Prime under its English title “The Awakening”.

== See also ==
- List of French television series
