= Les Amours du dimanche =

Studio album by Marc Lavoine
- Released: June 1989; 1993 (reissue)
- Recorded: June 1988–March 1989; CBS Studios, London; Studio Fortuny, Paris; Studio Marcadet, Paris; O'Henry Studio, Los Angeles; Studio Plus XXX, Paris
- Genre: Pop
- Label: AVREP/PolyGram; Disques Vogue/BMG (reissue)
- Producer: Fabrice Aboulker

Marc Lavoine chronology
Fabriqué (1987)	Les Amours du dimanche (1989)	Paris (1991)

Singles from Les Amours du dimanche
- 1. "C'est la vie " Released: May 1989; 2. "Ami " Released: 1989; 3. "Toutes mes excuses (Chère amie) " Released: 1990; 4. "Rue Fontaine " Released: September 1990; 5. "Je n'ai plus rien à te donner " Released: March 1991

Les Amours du dimanche is a 1989 album recorded by French artist Marc Lavoine. It was his third studio album and contains the singles "C'est la vie" (#14), "Ami", "Chère amie" (they failed to chart) "Rue Fontaine" (#11) and "Je n'ai plus rien à te donner" (#18) which obtained popularity in France. The album earned a Gold certification awarded by the SNEP and was ranked on the chart for 26 weeks in 1989 and 1991, peaking at #35 in its first and second weeks.

== Track listing ==
1. "C'est la vie" (Marc Lavoine / Fabrice Aboulker) — 3:47
2. "Du côté de chez toi" (Marc Lavoine / Fabrice Aboulker) — 4:31
3. "Chère amie" (Marc Lavoine / Fabrice Aboulker) — 3:33
4. "Rue Fontaine" (Marc Lavoine / Fabrice Aboulker) — 3:33
5. "Le Poids de ta peine" (Marc Lavoine / Fabrice Aboulker) — 3:13
6. "Les Amours du dimanche", part 1 (Instrumental) (Fabrice Aboulker) — 3:21
7. "Je n'ai plus rien à te donner" (Marc Lavoine / Fabrice Aboulker) — 3:52
8. "Cent balles de sentiment" (Marc Lavoine / Fabrice Aboulker) — 4:50
9. "T'es ma danseuse" (Marc Lavoine / Fabrice Aboulker) — 4:15
10. "Ami" (Marc Lavoine / Fabrice Aboulker) — 4:16
11. "Les Amours du dimanche", part 2 (Marc Lavoine / Fabrice Aboulker) — 3:51

== Album credits ==
- Fabrice Aboulker – arranger & keyboards
- The Astarte Orchestra – strings
- Jean-Philippe Bonichon - engineer & mixing (Paris)
- Sally Browder - assistant engineer (Los Angeles)
- Bill Butt - design for Liaison Internationale
- Bill Cuomo – keyboards & synthesizer
- Paulinho da Costa – percussion
- Richard Groulx – backing vocals
- Christopher Hooker – cor anglais
- Nick Knight – photography
- Abraham Laboriel – bass guitar
- Nick Lane – trombone
- Basile Leroux – guitar
- Steve Madaio – horn arrangement, trumpet
- Kate Markowitz – backing vocals
- Guida de Palma – backing vocals
- Philippe Rault - artistic coordinator
- Doug Rider - engineer (Los Angeles)
- Patrick Rousseau – percussion
- Carole Rowley – backing vocals
- Claude Salmiéri – drums
- Pascal Stive – arranger, engineer (Paris), keyboards, string engineer (London), synthesizer programming
- Jannick Top – bass guitar
- Carlos Vega – drums
- David Woodford – saxophone
- Gavyn Wright – concertmaster

- Mixed at Studio Marcadet

== Releases ==
Date	Label	Country	Format	Catalog
1989	AVREP/PolyGram	Belgium, France, Switzerland	LP; CD; Cassette	838 257-1; 838 257-2; 838 257-4
1989	B.C.C.L./Select	Canada	CD	BCCL-CD-059
1993	Disques Vogue/BMG	France	CD; Cassette	74321167632; 74321167634

== Certifications ==
Country	Certification	Date	Sales certified
France	Gold	1990	100,000

== Charts ==
Chart (1989–1991)	Peak position
French SNEP Albums Chart	35
