= Vietnamese people in Belgium =

Total population
- ~14,000 (2012 est.)

Regions with significant populations
- Brussels, Liège

Languages
- French, Vietnamese, Dutch, German

Religion
- Vietnamese folk religion, Mahayana Buddhism

Related ethnic groups
- Overseas Vietnamese, Vietnamese people in France, Vietnamese people in Germany, Vietnamese people in the Netherlands

Vietnamese people in Belgium or Vietnamese Belgian refers to people of Vietnamese ancestry who were born in or immigrated to Belgium. The population of the community is about 14,000 as of 2012.

== History ==
The first Vietnamese migrants to Belgium consisted of students and diplomats from South Vietnam beginning in 1965, when the South Vietnamese government sought for stronger relations with other Francophone nations following a minor rift with France. Belgium soon became a popular alternative to France for South Vietnamese students seeking higher education and career opportunities, especially in the cities of Brussels, Liège and Leuven.

A much larger influx of Vietnamese immigrants arrived as refugees following the Fall of Saigon, beginning in 1978. Similarly to their counterparts in France, South Vietnamese refugees to Belgium were largely of higher socioeconomic standing and integrated much easier into their host country's society due to better linguistic and cultural knowledge than their peers who settled in North America, Australia and the rest of Europe.

Following the fall of the Berlin Wall in 1989, a number of Vietnamese workers in former Soviet Bloc countries who were sponsored by the communist government of Vietnam sought asylum in Belgium. This included many guest workers in the former East Germany who were encouraged by the German government to be repatriated back to their home country following German reunification.

== Demographics and culture ==
A large proportion of the Vietnamese Belgian population resides in Brussels and the surrounding area, with a Vietnamese business district centered along Boulevard Anspach. The rest of the Vietnamese Belgian community is largely concentrated in the southern French-speaking Wallonia region, especially around the city of Liège.

The Vietnamese community in Belgium maintains strong relations with its counterpart community in France. Before the establishment of Vietnamese businesses and community institutions in Belgium during the late 1970s, Vietnamese Belgians would travel to Paris for various purposes, such as buying Vietnamese grocery products and seeking immigrant needs.

In terms of religion, the vast majority of Vietnamese Belgians are at least nominal Buddhists, following the Mahayana branch with influences from Confucian philosophy. The influx of Vietnamese immigrants into Belgium created a visible Buddhist community in the country, with temples serving as both spiritual and community centers, and have also attracted non-Vietnamese worshippers.

== Socioeconomics ==
The Vietnamese community in Belgium is largely well-integrated into Belgian society. Among immigrants from the former South Vietnam, initial strong knowledge of the French language allowed them to pursue studies and careers despite their recent arrival. While some Vietnamese immigrants did settle in the Flanders region and learned Dutch, most relocated to Brussels or Wallonia. Meanwhile, Belgian-born Vietnamese have extremely high rates of success in education, at many times outperforming their peers and having a high rate of enrollment in higher education.

== Notable people ==
- Quynh Anh

== See also ==
- Vietnamese people in France
- Vietnamese people in Germany
- Vietnamese people in the Netherlands
- Overseas Vietnamese
- Demographics of Belgium
