= The King Is Dancing =

Le Roi danse
- Theatrical release poster
- Directed by: Gérard Corbiau
- Written by: Marcel Beaulieu; Andrée Corbiau; Gérard Corbiau; Ève de Castro; Didier Decoin
- Produced by: Dominique Janne
- Starring: Benoît Magimel; Boris Terral; Tchéky Karyo
- Cinematography: Gérard Simon
- Edited by: Philippe Ravoet; Ludo Troch
- Music by: Jean-Baptiste Lully; Jacques Cordier; Michel Lambert; Robert Cambert
- Distributed by: UGC Fox Distribution
- Release dates: 6 December 2000 (Belgium and France); 8 February 2001 (Germany)
- Running time: 115 minutes
- Countries: France; Germany; Belgium
- Language: French

The King Dances (Le Roi danse) is a 2000 costume drama film co-written and directed by Gérard Corbiau based on Philippe Beaussant's biography of Jean-Baptiste Lully, Lully ou le musicien du soleil (1992). The film, presenting libertine Lully as a natural ally of the early Enlightenment figure Louis XIV of France in his conflicts with the Catholic establishment, focuses on Lully's personal relationship with the King, as well as his camaraderie with Molière and rivalry with Robert Cambert.

== Plot ==
Lully starts to gain the favour of the 14-year-old King Louis in 1653 by giving him specially designed shoes for Ballet Royal de la Nuit. His subsequent rise draws hostility from the old cadres of the court, particularly the royal composer Cambert.

Following Cardinal Mazarin's death, Louis installs himself in full power as the king in 1661. He is now at stake with the religious establishment created and controlled by his mother Anne of Austria at the Palais-Royal. On the other hand, Lully's animosity with Cambert comes to a novel dimension after Cambert's mistress Madeleine Lambert, the daughter of Michel Lambert, marries Lully in 1662.

Lully and another Versailles favourite, Molière, are keen to further disarm the old court. The duo get to understand their own limitations when conflict becomes more manifest at events such as the staging (and consequent ban) of Tartuffe in 1664. Meanwhile, the passing years bring an end to Lully's position as the king's dance teacher and choreographer and he also has to face the emotional tensions growing with his wife's niece Julie, which will culminate at the gala of Cambert's Pomone in 1671.

== Cast ==
- Benoît Magimel as Louis XIV
  - Emil Tarding as the young Louis XIV
- Boris Terral as Jean-Baptiste Lully
- Tchéky Karyo as Molière
- Johan Leysen as Robert Cambert
- Cécile Bois as Madeleine Lambert
- Claire Keim as Julie
- Idwig Stéphane as Prince de Conti
- Caroline Veyt as Armande Béjart
- Ingrid Rouif as Madame de Montespan
- Jacques François as Jean de Cambefort
- Pierre Gérald as Jean-Baptiste Boësset
- Vincent Grass as Archbishop of Paris
- Jean-Louis Sbille as Spectator
- Colette Emmanuelle (1943–2021) as Anne of Austria
- Serge Feuillard as Cardinal Mazarin

== Production ==
The film was shot on location at Versailles, as well as in other locations in France, Germany and Belgium. Sets for the film were built at MMC Studios in Cologne.
