= Marc Lavoine =

French singer and actor (born 1962)

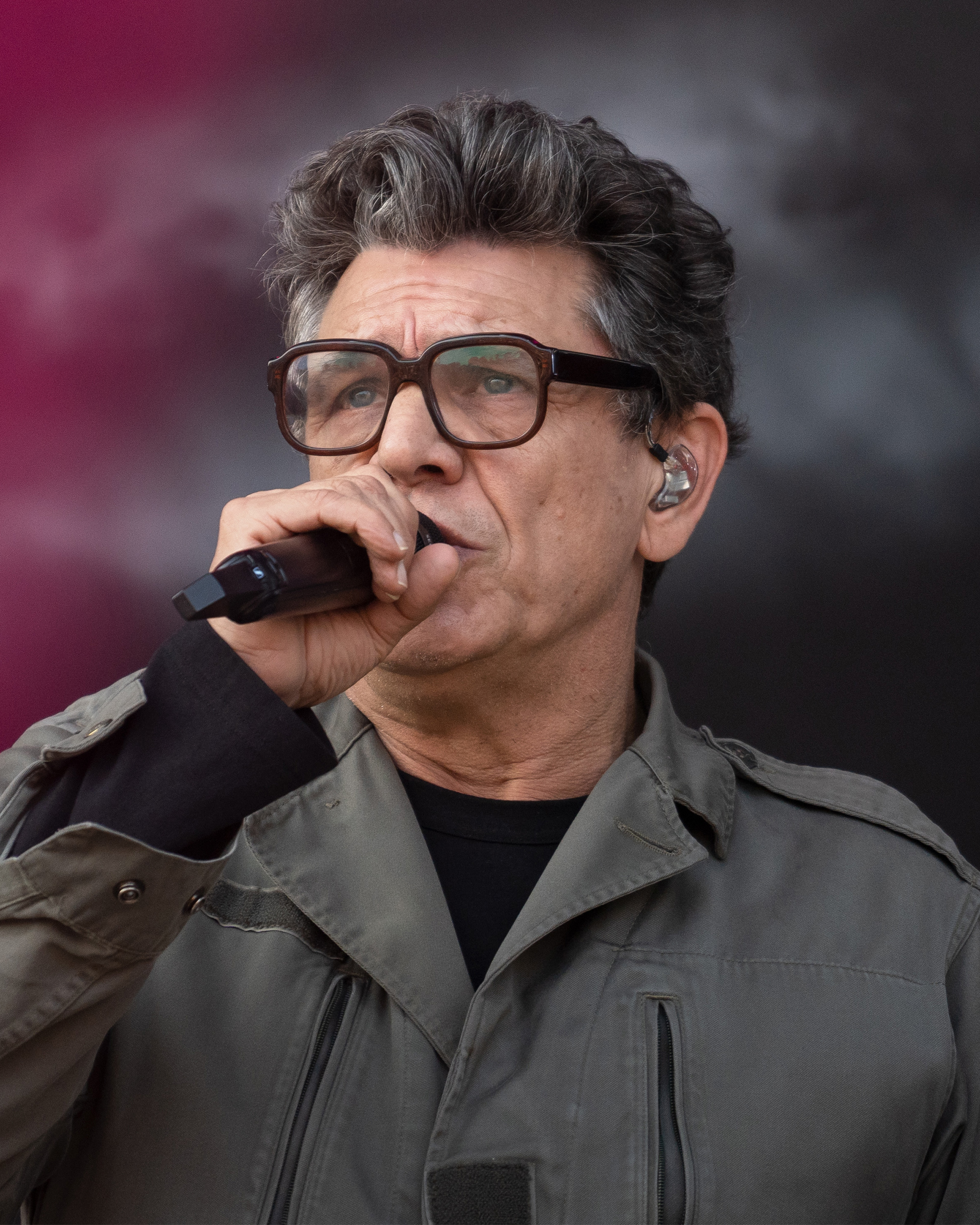
- Lavoine on stage in 2023

Background information
- Also known as: M. Oats
- Born: 6 August 1962 (age 63); Longjumeau, France
- Genres: Chanson, French pop
- Occupation(s): Singer, actor
- Years active: 1983–present
- Labels: Philips; AVREP/PolyGram; BMG; Mercury/Universal; Barclay

Marc Lucien Lavoine (French pronunciation: [maʁk lysjɛ̃ lavwan]; born 6 August 1962) is a French singer and actor. In 1985, his hit single "Elle a les yeux revolver..." reached number four on the French Singles chart and marked the beginning of his successful singing career. He starred in the television series Crossing Lines as Louis Daniel, head of an International Criminal Court police team that investigates crimes that cross European borders.

== Career ==
Lavoine was born near Paris. He was labelled a heart throb at the beginning of his career and remains popular. He released his first album, Le Parking des Anges, in 1985 with his song "Elle a les yeux revolver..." as a favourite among teens. In 1987, Lavoine released his second album Fabriqué. His single, "Qu'est-ce que t'es belle", was a duet with Les Rita Mitsouko leader Catherine Ringer. His third album Les Amours Du Dimanche was released in 1989, which sold 300,000 copies.

In 1992, the singles "Paris", also the title track of his fourth album, and "L'Amour de trente secondes" gained success. In 1993, Lavoine released his fifth album Faux Rêveur. Lavoine's sixth album Lavoine-Matic, released in 1996, included the single "C'est ça la France", which is a song of tolerance and was awarded Best Video from the Victoire de la Musique. In 1999, his seventh album Septième Ciel was released, with the first single as "Les Tournesols".

Lavoine's eighth album, which did not have a title, was released in 2001. Like former albums, this featured duets with female singers, including Italian singer and actress Cristina Marocco, singer Françoise Hardy and actress Claire Keim. In 2003, he released the single "Dis-moi que l'amour" and a live album entitled Olympia Deux Mille Trois. Lavoine's ninth album L'Heure d'été, included singles "Je me sens si seul", "Toi mon amour" and "J'espère", a duet with Belgian singer of Vietnamese descent Quynh Anh. He also wrote the song "Bonjour Vietnam" as a gift for Quynh Anh.

== Personal life ==
Marc Lavoine has a son, Simon, from his first marriage to ex-Vogue model Denise Pascale.

In 1995 he married Sarah Poniatowski (from the Poniatowski family, which is originally from Poland); they have three children together: Yasmine, Roman, and Milo (born 1 July 2010). They divorced in 2018.

On 25 July 2020 he married the novelist Line Papin. They divorced in 2022.

He now lives in Paris and has put out numerous albums along with several movies.

Lavoine is a member of the Les Enfoirés charity ensemble since 1996. He has no other known charitable interests.

== Discography ==
=== Studio albums ===
- 1985: Marc Lavoine (Philips)
- 1987: Fabriqué (Avrep/PolyGram)
- 1989: Les Amours du dimanche (Avrep/PolyGram)
- 1991: Paris (Avrep/PolyGram)
- 1993: Faux rêveur (BMG)
- 1996: Lavoine Matic (Avrep/RCA/BMG)
- 1999: 7e ciel (Avrep/RCA/BMG)
- 2001: Marc Lavoine (Mercury France/Universal)
- 2005: L'Heure d'été (Mercury France/Universal)
- 2009: Volume 10 (Mercury France/Universal)
- 2012: Je descends du singe (Barclay)
- 2018: Je reviens à toi (Universal Music Division Barclay)

=== Live albums ===
- Live (1988, Avrep)
- Olympia Deuxmilletrois (2003, Mercury/Universal)

=== Compilations ===
- 85-95 (1995, Avrep/RCA/BMG)
- C'est ça Lavoine: L'essentiel (2001, Avrep/RCA/BMG) 1984–1999
- Les Duos de Marc (2007, Mercury/Universal)
- Les Solos de Marc (2007, RCA/Sony BMG)
- La Collection de Marc (2007, Mercury/Universal)

=== Singles ===
Year	Title	Peak chart positions			Album
Year	Title	FRA	BEL (Wa)	SWI	Album
1983	"Je n'sais même plus de quoi j'ai l'air"	—	—	—	
1984	"Pour une biguine avec toi"	—	—	—	Marc Lavoine
1985	"Elle a les yeux revolver..."	4	—	—	Marc Lavoine
1985	"Tu me divises par deux"	—	—	—	Marc Lavoine
1986	"Le Parking des anges"	11	—	—	Marc Lavoine
1986	"Bascule avec moi"	14	—	—	Marc Lavoine
1987	"Même si"	14	—	—	Fabriqué
1987	"Le monde est tellement con"	20	—	—	Fabriqué
1988	"Qu'est-ce que t'es belle" (with Catherine Ringer)	31	—	—	Fabriqué
1988	"Si tu veux le savoir"	11	—	—	Fabriqué
1989	"C'est la vie"	14	—	—	Les Amours du dimanche
1989	"Ami"	—	—	—	Les Amours du dimanche
1990	"Toutes mes excuses (chère amie)"	—	—	—	Les Amours du dimanche
1990	"Rue Fontaine"	11	—	—	Les Amours du dimanche
1990	"Je n'ai plus rien à te donner"	18	—	—	Les Amours du dimanche
1991	"Paris"	28	—	—	Paris
1992	"L'Amour de 30 secondes"	32	—	—	Paris
1992	"Ça m'est égal"	41	—	—	Paris
1992	"Fils de moi"	—	—	—	Paris
1993	"Tu me suffiras"	—	—	—	Faux rêveur
1994	"On ira jamais à Venise"	—	—	—	Faux rêveur
1994	"Faux rêveur"	—	—	—	Faux rêveur
1995	"Une nuit sur son épaule" (with Véronique Sanson)	34	—	—	Comme ils l'imaginent (Véronique Sanson album)
1995	"Reste sur moi"	—	—	—	85-95
1996	"C'est ça la France"	—	—	—	Lavoine Matic
1996	"Petit à petit feu"	—	—	—	Lavoine Matic
1997	"Les hommes sont des femmes comme les autres" (with Princess Erika)	—	—	—	Lavoine Matic
1997	"Les Embouteillages"	—	—	—	Lavoine Matic
1998	"J'habite en jalousie"	—	—	—	Lavoine Matic
1999	"Les tournesols"	62	—	—	Septième ciel
1999	"Fais semblant"	—	—	—	Septième ciel
2000	"J'écris des chansons"	—	—	—	Septième ciel
2000	"Adieu Camille" (with Julie Depardieu)	—	—	—	
2001	"Le Pont Mirabeau"	83	—	—	Marc Lavoine
2001	"J'ai tout oublié" (with Cristina Marocco)	1	4	—	Marc Lavoine
2002	"J'aurais voulu"	54	—	—	Marc Lavoine
2002	"Je ne veux qu'elle" (with Claire Keim)	9	14	34	Marc Lavoine
2003	"Dis-moi que l'amour..." (with Bambou)	10	14	38	Olympia Deuxmilletrois
2005	"Je me sens si seul"	16	17	59	L'Heure d'été
2005	"Toi mon amour"	8	10	43	L'Heure d'été
2006	"Tu m'as renversé"	—	—	—	L'Heure d'été
2006	"J'espère" (with Quynh Anh)	—	—	—	L'Heure d'été
2007	"J'ai confiance en toi / me fido di te" (with Jovanotti)	—	—	—	Les Duos de Marc
2007	"Un Ami" (with Florent Pagny)	—	25	—	Les Duos de Marc
2009	"La semaine prochaine"	—	13	—	Volume 10
2009	"Reviens mon amour"	—	12	—	Volume 10
2010	"Rue des Acacias"	—	—	—	Volume 10
2010	"Demande moi"	—	—	—	
2013	"Chère amie"	159	—	—	
2018	"Comme je t'aime"	175	—	—	

== Filmography ==
- 1984 : Frankenstein 90
- 1994 : L'Enfer
- 1995 : Fiesta
- 1996 : Les Menteurs
- 1998 : Cantique de la racaille
- 1999 : Le double de ma moitié
- 2001 : Déception
- 2001 : My Wife Is an Actress
- 2002 : Blanche
- 2003 : Le coeur des hommes
- 2002 : The Good Thief
- 2003 : Les clefs de bagnole
- 2006 : Toute la beauté du monde
- 2006 : Arthur and the Minimoys (French voice of Darkos played by Jason Bateman)
- 2007 : Le cœur des hommes 2
- 2007 : Si c'était lui...
- 2009 : Korkoro (Liberté)
- 2013 : Crossing Lines
- 2014 : Papa was not a rolling stone
