= Paris (Marc Lavoine album) =

Studio album by Marc Lavoine
- Released: October 1991
- Recorded: France
- Genre: Pop
- Label: AVREP/PolyGram; Disques Vogue/BMG (reissue)
- Producer: Fabrice Aboulker; Jean-Philippe Bonichon

Marc Lavoine chronology
Les Amours du dimanche (1989)	Paris (1991)	Faux rêveur (1993)

Singles from Marc Lavoine
- 1. "Paris " Released: October 1991; 2. "L'Amour de 30 secondes " Released: March 1992; 3. "Ça m'est égal " Released: October 1992; 4. "Fils de moi " Released: March 1993

Paris is a 1991 album recorded by French artist Marc Lavoine. It was his fourth studio album and his fifth album overall. It provided three singles which achieved moderate success on the French Singles Chart : "Paris" (#28), "L'Amour de 30 secondes" (#32) and "Ça m'est égal" (#41). The album earned a Gold certification awarded by the SNEP and was ranked on the chart for eight weeks, peaking at #35 in its third and fifth weeks.

== Track listings ==
1. "L'Amour de 30 secondes" (Marc Lavoine / Fabrice Aboulker) — 3:40
2. "Ça m'est égal" (Marc Lavoine / Fabrice Aboulker) — 5:00
3. "Étagère" (Marc Lavoine / Fabrice Aboulker) — 2:58
4. "Laisse pousser les fleurs" (Marc Lavoine / Fabrice Aboulker) — 4:18
5. "Femme seule" (Marc Lavoine / Fabrice Aboulker) — 5:30
6. "Paris" (Marc Lavoine / Fabrice Aboulker) — 3:50
7. "Fils de moi" (Marc Lavoine / Fabrice Aboulker) — 4:01
8. "Tu ne peux pas savoir" (Marc Lavoine / Fabrice Aboulker) — 4:25
9. "Amour après guerre" (Pierre Grillet, Marc Lavoine / Fabrice Aboulker) — 4:15
10. "Madame sans gêne" (Marc Lavoine / Fabrice Aboulker) — 3:56

== Album credits ==
=== Production ===
- Produced by Fabrice Aboulker & Jean-Philippe Bonichon
- Engineered & mixed by Jean-Philippe Bonichon

=== Design ===
- Raymond Depardon - photography
- Bill Butt - design
- Paul Ritter - design

== Releases ==
Date	Label	Country	Format	Catalog
1991	AVREP/PolyGram	Belgium, France, Switzerland	CD; Cassette	191034-2; 191034-4
1994	Disques Vogue/BMG	France	CD; Cassette	74321167642; 74321167644

== Certifications ==
Country	Certification	Date	Sales certified
France	Gold	1992	100,000

== Charts ==
Chart (1991)	Peak position
French SNEP Albums Chart	35
