= Boris Terral =

French actor (born 1969)

- Born: 8 November 1969 (age 56); Saint-Denis, France
- Occupation: Actor
- Years active: 1992-present

Boris Terral (born 8 November 1969) is a French actor. He appeared in more than forty films since 1992.

== Selected filmography ==
Film
Year	Title	Role	Notes
2015	Blind Date	L'inconnu italien	
2003	Leave Your Hands on My Hips	Eric	
2000	Le Roi danse	Lully	
1998	The Garden of Eden	Jochanan	
1997	After Sex	Emilio	
1997	Metroland	Jacques	
1996	Pédale douce	Cyril	

TV
Year	Title	Role	Notes
2003	Joséphine, ange gardien	Renaud	TV series (1 episode)
2009	Éternelle	Christophe Morel	
