= A Promise (2013 film) =

- French theatrical release poster
- Directed by: Patrice Leconte
- Written by: Patrice Leconte; Jérôme Tonnerre
- Starring: Rebecca Hall; Alan Rickman; Richard Madden; Maggie Steed; Shannon Tarbet; Jean-Louis Sbille
- Cinematography: Eduardo Serra
- Edited by: Joelle Hache
- Music by: Gabriel Yared
- Distributed by: Mars Distribution
- Release date: September 2013 (TIFF)
- Running time: 95 minutes
- Country: France
- Language: English
- Budget: €10.4 million
- Box office: $1.5 million

A Promise is a 2013 English-language French drama romance film directed by Patrice Leconte and written by Patrice Leconte and Jérôme Tonnerre. The story is based on Stefan Zweig's 1929 novel Widerstand der Wirklichkeit (translated into English as Journey into the Past) and stars Rebecca Hall, Alan Rickman, Richard Madden, and Maggie Steed. It was screened in the Special Presentation section at the 2013 Toronto International Film Festival. It was the final film shot by Eduardo Serra before his death in 2025.

== Plot ==
In 1912 Germany, a freshly graduated engineer with modest origins, Friedrich Zeitz (Richard Madden), starts work at a steelworks owned by ageing tycoon Karl Hoffmeister (Alan Rickman). Hoffmeister is impressed by Zeitz's knowledge and commitment to the work, and Friedrich moves up through the ranks. When Hoffmeister's declining health starts to confine him permanently to his house, Friedrich has to visit him at home for briefings, which he then relays back to the steelworks. Through his visits, Friedrich makes the acquaintance of Hoffmeister's younger wife Charlotte (Rebecca Hall), a beautiful and reserved woman in her early 30s. He immediately becomes enamoured with her.

Friedrich begins to spend more time with the Hoffmeisters, tutoring their young son Otto. Hoffmeister asks Zeitz to move in with his family, so as to be as close as possible for business matters. Friedrich struggles with his growing feelings for Charlotte, not realising that they are reciprocated. Just as they disclose their mutual attraction towards one another, Friedrich has to leave the country to represent Hoffmeister on an overseas mining venture in Mexico. They make a promise to one another that, once Friedrich returns from Mexico, they can be together.

Charlotte and Friedrich communicate frequently in secret, but the outbreak of World War I and a military blockade prevent Friedrich from returning to Germany. Eventually the letters between the lovers are unable to pass through the blockade, and Charlotte begins to fear that Friedrich may be dead. Karl Hoffmeister dies of his illness, confessing to Charlotte that he should never have kept her and Friedrich apart. Some time after the war, Friedrich finally returns home. At first, the relationship between Charlotte and Friedrich is tense - so much has changed in the time they were apart - but they reunite and promise to never leave each other again.

== Cast ==
- Rebecca Hall as Charlotte "Lotte" Hoffmeister
- Alan Rickman as Karl Hoffmeister
- Richard Madden as Friedrich Zeitz
- Maggie Steed as Frau Hermann
- Shannon Tarbet as Anna
- Jean-Louis Sbille as Hans
- Toby Murray as Otto Hoffmeister
- Christelle Cornil as Post Office Employee
- Jonathan Sawdon as engineer

== Reception ==
Review aggregation website Rotten Tomatoes gives the film an approval rating of 13% based on 23 reviews, with an average rating of 4/10. On Metacritic, the film has a score of 36 out of 100, based on 39 critics, indicating "generally unfavorable reviews".

Critics commented on the quality of the film-making, but a number of reviewers criticised the lack of chemistry between the two leads. Justin Chang of Variety described the film as "awkward [and] passionless]" and Elizabeth Weitzman of the New York Daily News commented "A romantic triangle featuring Rebecca Hall, Alan Rickman and "Game of Thrones" costar Richard Madden has no business being this dull". David Parkinson of the Radio Times described the lack of spark between Madden and Hall as "unintentionally amusing". Some critics suggested that perhaps issues of translation, as Patrice Leconte's first English-language film, may have been partially responsible.

On the whole, critics felt that the film missed the mark as an adaptation. Robbie Collin, writing for The Telegraph, dismissed the film as "a classic Zweig narrative, as tight and prickly as a thorn-bush, pruned into a shapeless, leafy clump", while David Hughes of Empire advised "If you only watch one Stefan Zweig-inspired film this year, watch The Grand Budapest Hotel. If you watch two, see The Grand Budapest Hotel twice".

== Awards ==
Organization	Award category	Recipients	Result
Beijing International Film Festival	Best Supporting Actor	Alan Rickman	Won
Magritte Awards	Best Foreign Film in Co-Production	Patrice Leconte	Nominated
