= Anne Roussel =

French actress

- Born: 6 August 1960 (age 65); Albi, France
- Occupation: Actress
- Years active: 1981–present

Anne Roussel (born 6 August 1960) is a French actress. She has appeared in more than fifty films since 1981.

== Selected filmography ==
Year	Title	Role	Notes
1988	The Music Teacher	Sophie Maurier	
1991	The Yes Man	Juliette	
1991	El Rey Pasmado	The Queen	
