= 10 ans de succès (Marc Lavoine album) =

10 ans de succès 85-95 le meilleur de Marc Lavoine

Greatest hits album by Marc Lavoine
- Released: October 1995
- Recorded: 1984–1995
- Genre: Pop
- Labels: RCA Records, BMG
- Producer: Fabrice Aboulker

Marc Lavoine chronology
Faux rêveur (1993)	10 ans de succès 85-95 le meilleur de Marc Lavoine (1995)	Lavoine Matic (1996)

10 ans de succès, released with the yellow cover band 85-95 le meilleur de Marc Lavoine', is a 1995 compilation recorded by French artist Marc Lavoine. It was the singer's first best of and his seventh album overall. It was released in October 1995 and achieved success in France and Belgium (Wallonia), where it reached the top four. This compilation contains all the singer's singles from the beginning of hi career, plus two unreleased songs : "Reste sur moi", a song previously written for Patricia Kaas on her 1993 album Je te dis vous, and "Nu".

== Track listings ==
No.	Title	Writer(s)	Length
1.	"Pour une biguine avec toi"	Marc Lavoine / Fabrice Aboulker	3:40
2.	"Elle a les yeux revolver..."	Marc Lavoine / Fabrice Aboulker	3:30
3.	"Le parking des anges"	Marc Lavoine / Fabrice Aboulker	3:50
4.	"Bascule avec moi"	Marc Lavoine / Fabrice Aboulker	3:39
5.	"Même si"	Marc Lavoine / Fabrice Aboulker	3:32
6.	"Le monde est tellement con"	Marc Lavoine / Fabrice Aboulker	3:09
7.	"Qu'est-ce que t'es belle" (duet with Catherine Ringer)	Marc Lavoine, Patrice Mithois / Fabrice Aboulker	4:12
8.	"Si tu veux le savoir"	Marc Lavoine / Fabrice Aboulker	3:09
9.	"C'est la vie"	Marc Lavoine / Fabrice Aboulker	3:44
10.	"Chère amie (toutes mes excuses)"	Marc Lavoine / Fabrice Aboulker	4:04
11.	"Rue fontaine"	Marc Lavoine / Fabrice Aboulker	3:53
12.	"Je n'ai plus rien à te donner"	Marc Lavoine / Fabrice Aboulker	3:21
13.	"Paris"	Marc Lavoine / Fabrice Aboulker	3:49
14.	"L'amour de 30 secondes"	Marc Lavoine / Fabrice Aboulker	3:40
15.	"Ça m'est égal"	Marc Lavoine / Fabrice Aboulker	4:31
16.	"Tu me suffiras"	M. Oats / O. Menor	4:22
17.	"On n'ira jamais à Venise"	Marc Lavoine / Fabrice Aboulker	5:35
18.	"Une nuit sur son épaule" (duet with Véronique Sanson)	Véronique Sanson	3:40
19.	"Reste sur moi"	Marc Lavoine, Pierre Grillet / Fabrice Aboulker	4:08
20.	"Nu"	Marc Lavoine / Fabrice Aboulker	3:54

Source : Allmusic.

== Releases ==
Date	Label	Country	Format	Catalog
1995	RCA	Belgium, France	CD	96922
2005	BMG International	Belgium, France	CD	129692

== Personnel ==
=== Recording ===
- Arrangements : Pascal Stive, except 14,15, Eric Benzi (16), Hervé Leduc (18)
- Mixed by J.P.B., except :
  - 1,2 : Bernard Estardy
  - 4 : Manu Guyot
  - 7,16 : Tony Visconti
  - 18 : Justin Niebank
- Produced by Fabrice Aboulker for AVREP except :
  - 1,3,14,15 : Fabrice Aboulker for J.P.B.
  - 16,17 : Tony Visconti
  - 18 : Bernard Saint-Paul for B.S.P. Conseil
- Illustrations : Hervé Di Rosa
- Photo : Vincent Knapp

=== Editions ===
- 2–6, 8-12 : AVREP
- 1 : Société des Nouvelles Éditions Eddie Barclay droits transférés à Warner Chappell Music France / R.M.F.
- 7 : AVREP / Virgin
- 13–15,17,20 : AVREP / Les Amours du Dimanche
- 16 : AVREP / JRG
- 18 : Société des Éditions Musicales Piano Blanc
- 19 : Note de Blues / Les Amours du Dimanche

== Certifications ==
Country	Certification	Date	Sales certified
France	Gold	1996	200,000

== Charts ==
Chart (1995)	Peak position
Belgian (Wallonia) Albums Chart	4
French SNEP Albums Chart	4
