= Vietnamese people in the Netherlands =

Vietnamese people in the Netherlands Vietnamezen in Nederland Người Việt tại Hà Lan
Total population
- 25,135 (2022)

Regions with significant populations
- Helmond, Almere, Purmerend, Hoorn, Harlingen, Leeuwarden, Spijkenisse

Languages
- Vietnamese, Dutch

Religion
- Vietnamese folk religion, Mahayana Buddhism, Roman Catholicism

Related ethnic groups
- Overseas Vietnamese

Vietnamese people in the Netherlands (Dutch: Vietnamezen in Nederland; Vietnamese: Người Việt tại Hà Lan) form one of the smaller overseas Vietnamese communities of Europe. They consist largely of refugees from the former South Vietnam, Vietnamese born-citizens and their descendants (Dutch born-citizens of part or full Vietnamese origin).

== History ==
The first Vietnamese boat people arrived in the Netherlands in 1977.

In the early 1990s, after the fall of communist regimes all over Central and Eastern Europe, a group of about 400 Vietnamese—formerly guest workers in Czechoslovakia—fled to the Netherlands and sought asylum there. By May 1992, 300 still remained. The Vietnamese government, although it saw the asylum-seekers as guilty of a crime for having fled, offered assurances to the Dutch government that they would suffer no discrimination if repatriated.

== Demographic characteristics ==
As of 2009, statistics of the Dutch Centraal Bureau voor de Statistiek showed:

- 11,960 Vietnamese-born persons (5,623 men, 6,337 women)
- 6,955 locally born persons of Vietnamese background (3,534 men, 3,421 women), of which:
  - 1,027 persons with one parent also born locally (524 men, 503 women)
  - 5,928 persons with both parents born abroad (3,010 men, 2,918 women)

For a total of 18,915 persons (9,157 men, 9,758 women). This represented 46% growth over the 1996 total of 12,937 persons. Most of the growth was in the locally born segment of the population, whose numbers more than doubled from 3,366 persons over the period in question; the number of Vietnamese-born showed more modest growth of 25%, from 9,571 persons.

== Religion ==
A part of Vietnamese people in the Netherlands are Buddhists. Pagode Van Hanh is one of the official Vietnamese Buddhist temples in the Netherlands.

The two first parishes aimed at the Netherlands' Vietnamese Catholic community, the Allochtonen Missie van de Heilige Martelaren van Vietnam in Amersfoort and the Allochtonen Missie van de Heilige Moeder Maria in Deventer, were set up in 1994; at that time, there were estimated to be roughly 3,000 Vietnamese Catholics in the country.

== Cuisine ==
=== Vietnamese loempia ===
In the Netherlands a localised version of the Chả giò (or nem rán) known as the Vietnamese loempia is typically sold on every Dutch market and in many Dutch snackbars and supermarkets. These Vietnamese loempia's were introduced during the mid-1980s and are typically served with a special sauce invented for the Dutch market as Dutch people are unfamiliar with fish sauce.

== Notable individuals ==
- Nhung Dam (born 1984), actress and writer
- Chloe Nguyen (born 1987), actress and television presenter
- Vincent Nguyen (born 1995), basketball player
- Reiky de Valk (2000–2023), actor
- Lian Tran (born 2002), tennis player

== See also ==
- Netherlands–Vietnam relations
- Vietnamese diaspora
- Immigration to the Netherlands
