= Philippe Russo =

French singer-songwriter (born 1961)

- Born: Philippe Russo; 4 October 1961 (age 64)
- Origin: Paris, France
- Genres: Pop, Synthpop
- Occupation(s): Singer, songwriter
- Instrument: Guitar
- Years active: 1986–1992
- Labels: EMI France (1986–1989) - Flarenasch / Carrère (1990–1992)

Philippe Russo is a French singer-songwriter (born on 4 October 1961, Paris). He had a hit between 1986 and early 1987 in France with his single "Magie noire", devoted to the discothèques, which peaked at #10 on the SNEP Singles Chart. Then he published several singles until 1991, but they were unsuccessful and failed to reach the chart. Therefore, Russo can be deemed a one-hit wonder. He was the guitar of Marc Lavoine during this one's last concert tour.

== Discography ==
=== Singles ===
Year	Side A / Side B	Label
1986	Magie noire / Mr. Gossen - #10 in France	EMI France
1987	En Pleine Lumière / La muraille de Chine	EMI France
1988	Corps et Âme / Les terrasses	EMI France
1989	Emmenez-moi / Miss Lester	EMI France
1991	Change pas / Envies douces	Flarenasch / Carrère
1992	Les garçons s'envolent / Change pas	Flarenasch / Carrère
