= Elle a les yeux revolver... =

Single by Marc Lavoine

from the album Marc Lavoine
- B-side: "J'veux faire la paix avec toi"
- Released: 5 March 1985
- Recorded: 1985; Studio CBE, Paris
- Genre: Pop
- Length: 3:33; 5:05 (remix)
- Label: Bandit, Phonogram
- Songwriters: Marc Lavoine (lyrics); Fabrice Aboulker (music)
- Producer: Fabrice Aboulker

Marc Lavoine singles chronology
"Pour une biguine avec toi" (1983)	"Elle a les yeux revolver..." (1985)	"Le Parking des anges" (1986)

"Elle a les yeux revolver..." is a 1985 pop song recorded by French singer Marc Lavoine. It was the second single from his debut album Marc Lavoine, and his third single overall. Released in March 1985, the song was a top four hit in France, becoming the singer's first successful single, and has remained to date one of Lavoine's signature songs.

== Lyrics and music ==
Written by Marc Lavoine and composed by Fabrice Aboulker, the song deals with a woman described in the lyrics as a femme fatale. The song is characterized by "a few notes of Far East color, violins that slightly give rhythm to the song, [and] a warm and sensual voice".

== Chart performance ==
In France, "Elle a les yeux revolver..." entered the SNEP singles chart at number 48 on 18 May 1985, then climbed and reached number four on 13 and 27 July. It remained for 13 weeks in the top ten and totaled 25 weeks in the top 50.

== Versions ==
"Elle a les yeux revolver..." was performed in a live version at the Olympia (Paris) and included on the 2003 Olympia Deuxmilletrois album. The song also appears on Lavoine's compilations 85-95, Les Solos de Marc and La Collection de Marc. The singer re-recorded his song in a new version, more acoustic, on his 2001 studio album Marc Lavoine on which it is featured as a hidden track. "Elle a les yeux revolver..." was notably covered in 1998 by British a cappella vocal group The Flying Pickets on its cover album Vox Pop, on which it features as third track. This 3:40 version was just entitled "Les Yeux revolver". The song was translated in Dutch by Bart Herman in the song ‘ogen van lood’. The song was also covered in 2003 by A La Recherche De La Nouvelle Star on its album 1ers Tubes.

== Track listings ==
- 7" single
1. "Elle a les yeux revolver..." — 3:33
2. "J'veux faire la paix avec toi" — 3:18
- 12" maxi single
1. "Elle a les yeux revolver..." (remix) — 5:05
2. "J'veux faire la paix avec toi" — 3:18
- Digital download
1. "Elle a les yeux revolver..." — 3:37
2. "Elle a les yeux revolver..." (2003 live) — 3:57

== Credits ==
- Fabrice Aboulker - producer for AVREP
- Bruno de Balincourt - photography
- Bernard Estardy - engineer
- Pascal Stive - arranger
- Brigitte Terrasse - design for DGA

== Charts ==
Chart (1985)	Peak position
Europe (European Hot 100 Singles)	30
France (SNEP)	4

== Certifications and sales ==
Region	Certification	Certified units/sales
France (SNEP)	Silver	250,000^{*}
^{*} Sales figures based on certification alone.
