= Quynh Anh =

Vietnamese-Belgian singer

- Born: Quynh Anh Pham or Pham Quynh Anh; 16 January 1987 (age 39); Liège, Belgium
- Genre: French pop
- Occupation: Singer
- Instrument: Vocals
- Years active: 2005–present
- Label: Universal
- Website: https://www.universalmusic.fr/quynh-anh/

Quynh Anh Pham (born 16 January 1987 in Liège, Belgium) is a Vietnamese-Belgian singer.

== Singing career ==
From an early age, Quynh Anh participated in numerous music activities in Mons. In September 2000 her father enrolled her in the TV singing competition "Pour la Gloire" (For the Glory) held by Belgium TV channel RTBF, where she won first prize. Through this competition she met her new manager, who introduced Quynh Anh to her producer. In 2002 she signed a contract with Rapas Centre, a French branch of Universal. The producer made possible Quynh Anh's duet "J'espère" with French hit singer Marc Lavoine in 2005. Quynh Anh then accompanied Lavoine on a tour through France, Switzerland, and Belgium.

Quynh Anh reached international popularity in 2006 with her French song "Bonjour Vietnam", composed by Lavoine and co-written by Lavoine and Yvan Coriat. Lavoine said he was touched by the innocent charm and the longing of a small girl who had never seen her homeland. Later, Quynh Anh worked with her producer Pierre-Alain Simon to release her first album "Bonjour Vietnam". Due to its popularity, "Bonjour Vietnam" was translated into English by Guy Balbaert and was called "Hello Vietnam" (not to be confused with the single "Hello Vietnam" written by Tom T. Hall and recorded by American country music singer Johnnie Wright in 1965). In May 2008 Quynh Anh performed "Hello Vietnam" in the Paris by Night 92 show by Thúy Nga Productions. The song was even used by Vietjet Air as background music while disembarking from the plane.

== Discography ==
=== Album ===
- Bonjour Vietnam

=== Singles ===
- 2005: J'espère (duet with Marc Lavoine)
- 2006: Bonjour Vietnam
- 2008: Hello Vietnam
- 2010: I Say Gold
