= J'ai tout oublié =

Single by Marc Lavoine and Cristina Marocco

from the album Marc Lavoine
- B-side: "Ma Jonque est jaune"
- Released: 19 November 2001
- Recorded: Studio Méga, Suresnes
- Genre: Pop
- Length: 4:05
- Label: Mercury, Universal
- Songwriters: Marc Lavoine (lyrics); Georges Lunghini (music)
- Producers: Jean-François Berger; François Delabrière; Marc Lavoine

Marc Lavoine singles chronology
"Le pont Mirabeau" (2001)	"J'ai tout oublié" (2001)	"J'aurais voulu" (2002)

"J'ai tout oublié" is a 2001 song recorded as a duet by the French artist Marc Lavoine and the Italian singer Cristina Marocco. The song was released on 19 November 2001 as the second single from Lavoine's eighth album, just entitled Marc Lavoine. It reached number one on the French Singles Chart, thus becoming to date the most successful single of the singer in France.

== Background and cover versions ==
The song was written by Marc Lavoine and the music composed by Georges Lunghini, the father of Elsa Lunghini. This song allowed Lavoine to take up with the success, because its previous single failed to reach Top 50. "J'ai tout oublié" was much aired on many radios such as NRJ.

In 2004, the song was covered by Jean-Louis Aubert, Calogero and Lorie on Les Enfoirés' album Les Enfoirés dans l'espace. This 4:57 version is the tenth track.

== Chart performance ==
In France, "J'ai tout oublié" went straight to number eight on 27 November 2001 and gained a few places almost every week, until reaching number one in the 14th week, and stayed there for two weeks. Then, the single almost did not stop to drop on the chart and totaled 18 weeks in the top ten, 27 weeks in the top 50 and 30 weeks in the top 100. It achieved Gold status and was ranked number 69 and number 20 on the 2001 and 2002 year-end charts, respectively. As of August 2014, it is the 63rd best-selling single of the 21st century in France, with 359,000 units sold. In the region Wallonia of Belgium, "J'ai tout oublié" charted for 21 weeks on the Ultratop 40, from 8 December 2001, spending eleven weeks in the top ten and peaking at number four in the 13th week. It was certified Gold disc, and was the 50th best-selling single of 2002 in this territory.

== Track listings ==
CD single

1. "J'ai tout oublié" — 4:05
2. "Ma Jonque est jaune" by Marc Lavoine (Jean Fauque/Marc Lavoine) — 3:30

== Personnel ==
- Programmations : Jean-François Berger and Mathew Vaughan
- Keyboards : Jean-François Berger
- Background vocals : Claire Keim
- First violin : Gavyn Wright

== Charts and sales ==
=== Weekly charts ===
Weekly chart performance for "J'ai tout oublié"
Chart (2001–02)	Peak position
Belgium (Ultratop 50 Wallonia)	4
Europe (European Hot 100 Singles)	3
France (SNEP)	1

=== Year-end charts ===
2001 year-end chart performance for "J'ai tout oublié"
Chart (2001)	Position
France (SNEP)	69

2002 year-end chart performance for "J'ai tout oublié"
Chart (2002)	Position
Belgium (Ultratop 50 Wallonia)	50
Europe (Eurochart Hot 100 Singles)	23
France (Airplay Chart)	10
France (TV Music Videos Chart)	53
France (SNEP)	20

== Certifications and sales ==
Region	Certification	Certified units/sales
Belgium (BRMA)	Gold	25,000^{*}
France (SNEP)	Gold	359,000
^{*} Sales figures based on certification alone.
