= Gérard Corbiau =

Belgian film director

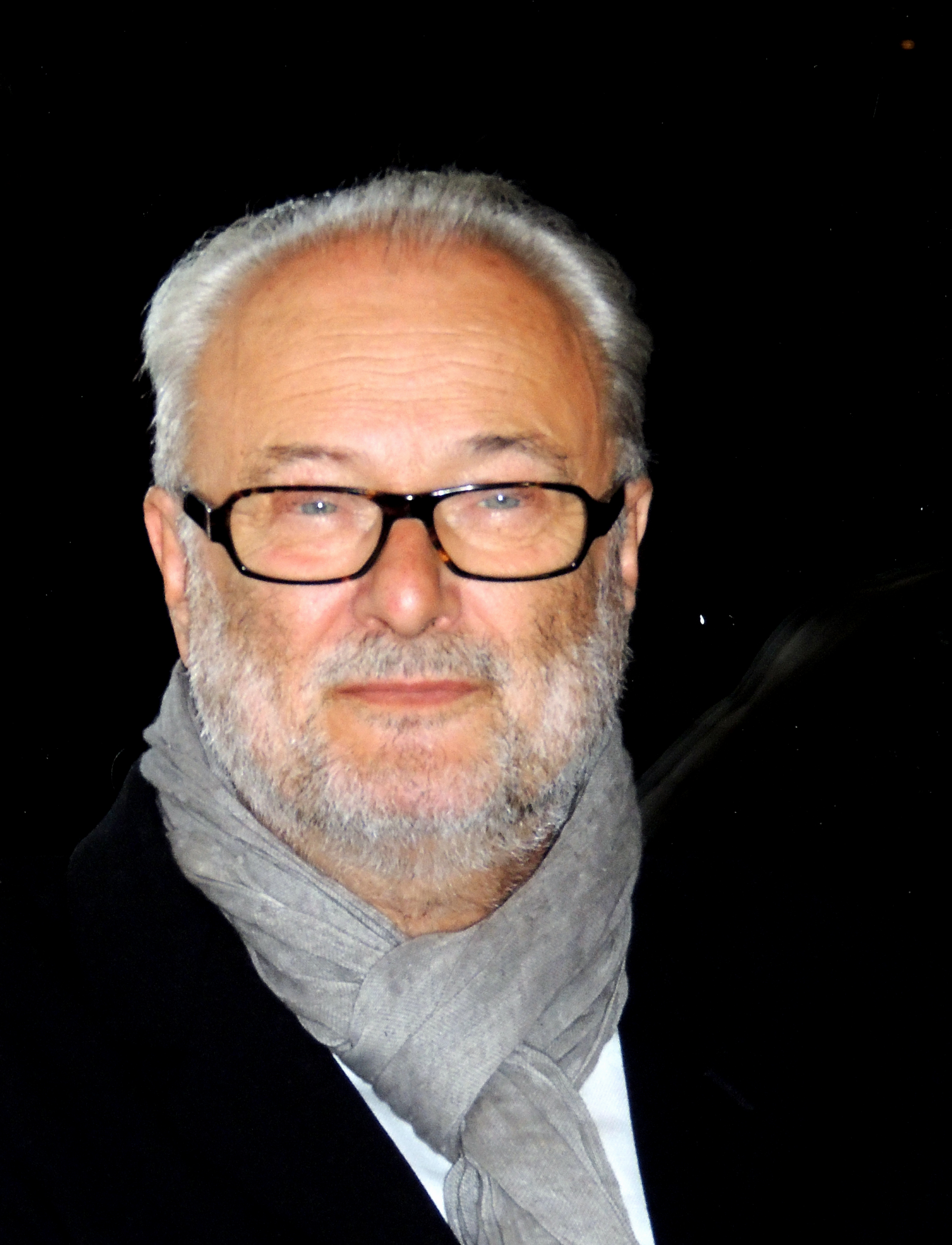
- Born: 19 September 1941 (age 85); Brussels, Belgium
- Occupation: Filmmaker

Gérard Corbiau (French: [kɔʁbjo]; born 19 September 1941) is a Belgian film director.

Corbiau was born in Brussels, Belgium. He is best known for his costume dramas about music, Le maître de musique (1988), Farinelli (1994) and Le roi danse (2000). Two of them (Le maître de musique and Farinelli) were nominated for the Academy Award for Best Foreign Language Film. He lives in Belgium and is working on several projects.

== Filmography ==
- The Music Teacher (1988)
- L'année de l'éveil (1991)
- Farinelli (1994)
- Versailles, la visite (1999)
- The King Is Dancing (2000)
- Saint-Germain ou La négociation (2003)
- Augustin Dumay, Laisser une trace dans le coeur (2009)
- Abdel Rahman El Bacha: Un piano entre Orient et Occident (2015)
