= Cristina Marocco =

Italian singer and actress (born 1972)

- Born: Cristina Marocco; 21 March 1972 (age 54)
- Origin: Italy
- Genres: Pop
- Occupations: Singer, actress
- Years active: 1996–present
- Website: www.cristinamarocco.com

Cristina Marocco (born 21 March 1972 in Turin, Italy) is an Italian singer and actress.

== Biography ==
Cristina Marocco's father had Sicilian origin; some believe that one of his grandparents came from Morocco; for this reason he was called "Marocco", which means "Morocco" in the Italian language.

Cristina Marocco became famous as an actress in her home country. She met Marc Lavoine and recorded with him the song "J'ai tout oublié", which became a huge hit in France and 2001. Marocco worked then on her first album, and her first single from this album, "Appelle-moi", was released in May 2003. Her album À côté du soleil was released a few months later. On this album, Lara Fabian wrote the song "Faire semblant". In 2008, she came out with her latest album, Je te dirais que tout est beau. The video clip Le Parfum, appeals the French public. This video was shot in one of the most paris prestigious hotel, the champs elysees plaza hotel.

== Discography ==
=== Albums ===
- 2003 : À côté du soleil
- 2008 : Je te dirais que tout est beau

=== Singles ===
- 2001 : "J'ai tout oublié" (duet with Marc Lavoine) – No. 1 in France, No. 4 in Belgium
- 2002 : "On s'en va" – No. 84 in France
- 2003 : "Appelle-moi"
- 2003 : "Tout donner"
- 2008 : "Le Parfum"
