= Claire Keim =

French actress and singer (born 1975)

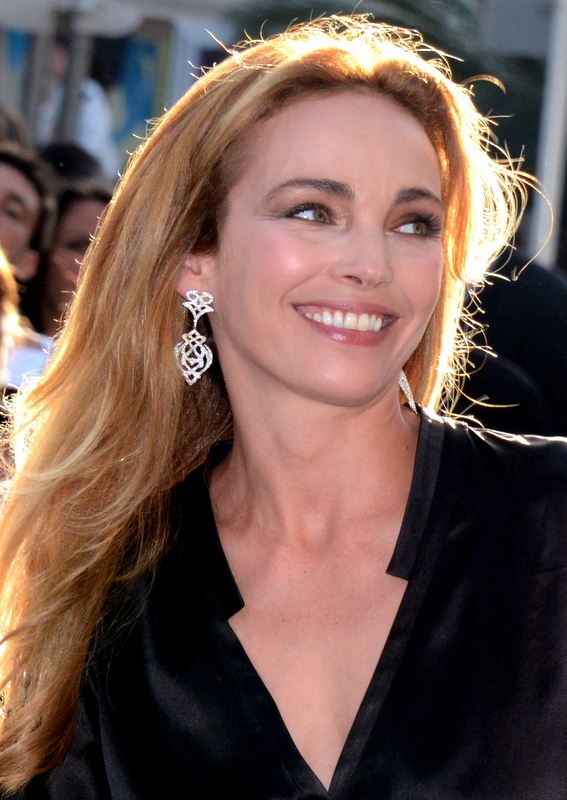
- Keim at the 2014 Cannes Film Festival
- Born: 8 July 1975 (age 51); Senlis, Oise, Picardy, France
- Occupations: Actress, singer
- Years active: 1994–present
- Partner: Bixente Lizarazu (2006-present)
- Website: http://www.clairekeim.fr/

Claire Keim (born Claire Lefebvre 8 July 1975) is a French actress and singer.

== Biography ==
Keim was born in Senlis, Oise to an architect father and a dentist mother. She is in a relationship with French footballer Bixente Lizarazu, and lives in Saint-Jean-de-Luz and Paris. She gave birth to their daughter Uhaina in August 2008.

== Filmography ==
Year	Title	Role	Director	Notes
1994	Les yeux d'Hélène	Cornélia	Jean Sagols	TV series (8 episodes)
1994	Tous les garçons et les filles de leur âge...	Ariane	Émilie Deleuze	TV series (1 episode)
1994	Tour Eiffel	The prostitute	Veit Helmer	Short
1994	Bout d'essai		Frédéric Darié	Short
1994	Highlander: The Series	Waitress	Dennis Berry	TV series (1 episode)
1994	Le juge est une femme	Pauline Vivien	Claude Grinberg	TV series (1 episode)
1995	Au petit Marguery	Mylène	Laurent Bénégui	
1996	Cubic		Thomas Chabrol	TV series
1996	Je m'appelle Régine	Régine	Pierre Aknine	TV movie
1996	La Belle Verte	Sonia	Coline Serreau	
1996	Oui	Marie	Alexandre Jardin	
1996	La dernière fête	Marie	Pierre Granier-Deferre	TV movie
1997	Bonjour Antoine	Clémentine	Radu Mihăileanu	TV movie
1997	J'irai au paradis car l'enfer est ici	Claire	Xavier Durringer	
1997	Barracuda	Margot	Philippe Haïm	
1997	Highlander: The Series	Marie	Dennis Berry (2)	TV series (1 episode)
1998	Marriages	Catherine	Cristina Comencini	
1998	Donne in bianco	Francesca	Tonino Pulci	
1999	Chambre n° 13		Olivier Dahan	TV series (1 episode)
1999	Vérité oblige	Claire Forestier	Claude-Michel Rome	TV series (1 episode)
1999	Juliette	Juliette	Jérôme Foulon	TV movie
1999	Le juge est une femme	Catherine	Pierre Boutron	TV series (1 episode)
2000	Le sens des affaires	Laetitia Zoët	Guy-Philippe Bertin	
2000	The Girl	The Girl	Sande Zeig	
2000	Le Roi danse	Julie	Gérard Corbiau	
2001	Juliette: Service(s) compris	Juliette	Jérôme Foulon (2)	TV movie
2001	Le roman de Lulu	Lulu	Pierre-Olivier Scotto	
2001	Le nouveau big bang	Julie	Nicolas Koretzky	Short
2001	Step by Step		Laurent Merlin	
2001	Ripper	Chantal Etienne	John Eyres	
2001	Heureuse	The happy girl	Céline Nieszawer	Short
2002	Il giovane Casanova	Elisabetta	Giacomo Battiato	TV movie
2002	Féroce	Lucie	Gilles de Maistre	
2002	Le secret de la belle de Mai	Alice	Patrick Volson	TV movie
2002	Vertiges	Emmanuelle / Céline	Steve Suissa	TV series (1 episode)
2003	Good Dog		Antoine Raimbault	Short
2003	Calypso Is Like So	The journalist	Bruno Collet	Short
2003	En territoire indien	Gladys	Lionel Epp	
2003	Un homme par hasard	Léa Faber	Édouard Molinaro	TV movie
2003	Entrusted	Catherine Lamiel	Giacomo Battiato (2)	TV movie
2004	Les aventures extraordinaires de Michel Strogoff	Nadia Fedor	Alexandre Huchez; Bruno-René Huchez	
2004	Petits mythes urbains	Pretty Young Girl	Yzabel Dzisky	TV series (1 episode)
2004	Zodiaque	Esther Delaître	Claude-Michel Rome (2)	TV series (5 episodes)
2005	À la poursuite de l'amour	Camille	Laurence Katrian	TV movie
2006	A Pirate's Heart	Elisabeth Preen	Miguel Alexandre	TV movie
2006	Le maître du Zodiaque	Esther Delaître	Claude-Michel Rome (3)	TV mini-series
2007	Caravaggio	Fillide Melandroni	Angelo Longoni	TV movie
2007	Un admirateur secret	Laura Fabre	Christian Bonnet	TV movie
2008	La vie à une	Elisa	Frédéric Auburtin	TV movie
2009	The Magical Odyssey, the Child and the Earth	Titania	Dominique Benicheti	Short
2009	Éternelle	She	Didier Delaître	TV series (6 episodes)
2009	Beauté fatale	Alice Grant	Claude-Michel Rome (4)	TV movie
2010	Le grand restaurant	A client	Gérard Pullicino	TV movie
2010	Le pigeon	Victoire de Moustier	Lorenzo Gabriele	TV movie
2011	Dans la peau d'une grande	Olivia	Pascal Lahmani	TV movie
2011	La nouvelle Blanche-Neige	Gabrielle	Laurent Bénégui (2)	TV movie
2010-12	Les Edelweiss	Anne-Sophie	Philippe Proteau; Stéphane Kappes	TV series (3 episodes)
2012	Nom de code: Rose	Margot Chapelier	Arnauld Mercadier	TV movie
2013	Jusqu'au bout du monde	Virginie	Gilles de Maistre (2)	TV movie
2014	Respire	Laura	Mélanie Laurent	
2014	La dernière échappée	Valérie Fignon	Fabien Onteniente	TV movie
2016	Arrête ton cinéma	Julie Dumas	Diane Kurys	
2016	Zootropolis	Dawn Bellwether	Byron Howard; Rich Moore	French version
2019	Infidèle	Emma		TV series
2023	Année Zéro	Anna Honoré	Olivier Barma	TV series (4 episodes)
2026	Missed Call	Virginie Taylor	Sheree Folkson	TV Series (5 episodes)
