= 24th Lumière Awards =

2019 French film awards ceremony

- Official poster
- Date: 4 February 2019
- Site: Institut du Monde Arabe, Paris, France

Highlights
- Most awards: The Sisters Brothers (3)
- Most nominations: In Safe Hands, The Sisters Brothers, Mademoiselle de Joncquières (4)

The 24th Lumière Awards ceremony, presented by the Académie des Lumières, took place on 4 February 2019 to honour the best in French films of 2018. The nominations were announced on 17 December 2018.

== Nominees ==
Best Film The Sisters Brothers - Jacques Audiard: Amanda - Mikhaël Hers; Guy - Alex Lutz; Mademoiselle de Joncquières - Emmanuel Mouret; In Safe Hands - Jeanne Herry	Best Director Jacques Audiard — The Sisters Brothers: Jeanne Herry — In Safe Hands; Xavier Legrand — Custody; Gaspar Noé — Climax; Pierre Salvadori — The Trouble with You
Best Actor Alex Lutz — Guy: Romain Duris — Our Struggles; Vincent Lacoste — Amanda; Vincent Lindon — At War; Denis Ménochet — Custody	Best Actress Élodie Bouchez — In Safe Hands: Cécile de France — Mademoiselle de Joncquières; Léa Drucker — Custody; Virginie Efira — An Impossible Love; Mélanie Thierry — Memoir of War
Best Male Revelation Félix Maritaud — Sauvage: Anthony Bajon — The Prayer; William Lebghil — The Freshmen; Andranic Manet — A Paris Education; Dylan Robert — Shéhérazade	Best Female Revelation Ophélie Bau — Mektoub, My Love: Canto Uno: Galatea Bellugi — The Apparition; Andréa Bescond — Little Tickles; Jeanne Cohendy — Head Above Water; Kenza Fortas — Shéhérazade
Best First Film Custody - Xavier Legrand: Little Tickles - Andréa Bescond and Eric Métayer; The Wild Boys - Bertrand Mandico; Sauvage - Camille Vidal-Naquet; Shéhérazade - Jean-Bernard Marlin	Best Screenplay The Trouble with You — Pierre Salvadori, Benoît Graffin and Benjamin Charbit: Little Tickles — Andréa Bescond and Eric Métayer; In Safe Hands — Jeanne Herry; The Freshmen — Thomas Lilti; Mademoiselle de Joncquières — Emmanuel Mouret
Best Cinematography Benoît Debie — The Sisters Brothers: Benoît Debie — Climax; Laurent Desmet — Mademoiselle de Joncquières; Julien Hirsch — One Nation, One King; David Ungaro — To the Ends of the World	Best Music Vincent Blanchard and Romain Greffe — Guy: Camille Bazbaz — The Trouble with You; Alexandre Desplat — The Sisters Brothers; Pierre Desprats — The Wild Boys; Grégoire Hetzel — An Impossible Love
Best Documentary Samouni Road - Stefano Savona: Cassandro the Exotico! - Marie Losier; Each and Every Moment - Nicolas Philibert; No Man Is an Island - Dominique Marchais; Young Solitude - Claire Simon	Best Animated Film Dilili in Paris - Michel Ocelot: Asterix: The Secret of the Magic Potion - Louis Clichy and Alexandre Astier; Mutafukaz - Shojiro Nishimi and Run; Pachamama - Juan Antín
Best Film from a French-speaking Country Girl - Lukas Dhont: Capernaum - Nadine Labaki; Chris the Swiss - Anja Kofmel; The Insult - Ziad Doueiri; Our Struggles - Guillaume Senez	Honorary Award: Claude Lelouch and Anouk Aimée for the film A Man and a Woman; Jane Birkin

== See also ==
- 44th César Awards
- 9th Magritte Awards
