= 44th César Awards =

2019 French film awards

- Official poster featuring a photo of actress Isabelle Huppert, taken during filming of Violette Nozière (1978) by Roger Corbeau
- Date: 22 February 2019
- Site: Salle Pleyel, Paris
- Hosted by: Kad Merad

Highlights
- Best Film: Custody
- Best Actor: Alex Lutz; Guy
- Best Actress: Léa Drucker; Custody
- Most awards: Custody (4); The Sisters Brothers (4)
- Most nominations: Custody (10); Sink or Swim (10)

Television coverage
- Network: Canal+

The 44th César Awards ceremony, presented by the Académie des Arts et Techniques du Cinéma, took place on 22 February 2019, at the Salle Pleyel in Paris to honour the best French films of 2018. Kristin Scott Thomas presided, and Kad Merad was the host. The ceremony was dedicated to Charles Aznavour, who died the previous October.

For the first time the "César des Lycéens" will be awarded, in a separate ceremony on 13 March 2019, at the Sorbonne in Paris. This award is to be conferred on one of the seven nominees for Best Film and is selected by the students of three high schools.

== Winners and nominees ==
The nominees for the 44th César Awards were announced on January 23, 2019.

Best Film Custody − Produced by Alexandre Gavras; Directed by Xavier Legrand: Sink or Swim − Produced by Alain Atall and Hugo Sélignac; Directed by Gilles Lellouche; The Sisters Brothers − Produced by Pascal Caucheteaux, Grégoire Sorlat and Michel Merkt; Directed by Jacques Audiard; In Safe Hands − Produced by Alain Atall, Hugo Sélignac and Vincent Mazel; Directed by Jeanne Herry; Guy − Produced by Oury Milshtein; Directed by Alex Lutz; The Trouble with You − Produced by Philippe Martin and David Thion; Directed by Pierre Salvadori; Memoir of War − Produced by Laetitia Gonzalez, Yael Fögiel, David Gauquié, Julien Deris and Etienne Mallet; Directed by Emmanuel Finkiel	Best Director Jacques Audiard − The Sisters Brothers: Alex Lutz − Guy; Gilles Lellouche − Sink or Swim; Pierre Salvadori − The Trouble with You; Jeanne Herry − In Safe Hands; Xavier Legrand − Custody; Emmanuel Finkiel − Memoir of War
Best Actor Alex Lutz − Guy: Romain Duris − Our Struggles; Denis Ménochet − Custody; Pio Marmaï − The Trouble with You; Gilles Lellouche − In Safe Hands; Édouard Baer − Mademoiselle de Joncquières; Vincent Lacoste − Amanda	Best Actress Léa Drucker − Custody: Adèle Haenel − The Trouble with You; Sandrine Kiberlain − In Safe Hands; Élodie Bouchez − In Safe Hands; Virginie Efira − An Impossible Love; Mélanie Thierry − Memoir of War; Cécile de France − Mademoiselle de Joncquières
Best Supporting Actor Philippe Katerine − Sink or Swim: Denis Podalydès − Sorry Angel; Damien Bonnard − The Trouble with You; Clovis Cornillac − Little Tickles; Jean-Hugues Anglade − Sink or Swim	Best Supporting Actress Karin Viard − Little Tickles: Audrey Tautou − The Trouble with You; Leïla Bekhti − Sink or Swim; Isabelle Adjani − The World is Yours; Virginie Efira − Sink or Swim
Most Promising Actor Dylan Robert − Shéhérazade: Thomas Gioria − Custody; William Lebghil − The Freshman; Anthony Bajon − The Prayer; Karim Leklou − The World is Yours	Most Promising Actress Kenza Fortas − Shéhérazade: Galatea Bellugi − The Apparition; Lily-Rose Depp − A Faithful Man; Ophélie Bau − Mektoub, My Love: Canto Uno; Camille Berthomier − An Impossible Love
Best Original Screenplay Custody − Xavier Legrand: The Trouble with You − Pierre Salvadori, Benoît Graffin, Benjamin Charbit; Sink or Swim − Gilles Lellouche, Ahmed Hamidi, Julien Lambroschini; Guy − Alex Lutz, Anaïs Deban, Thibault Ségouin; In Safe Hands − Jeanne Herry	Best Adaptation Little Tickles − Andréa Bescond, Éric Métayer: The Sisters Brothers − Jacques Audiard, Thomas Bidegain; Mademoiselle de Joncquières − Emmanuel Mouret; An Impossible Love − Catherine Corsini, Laurette Polmanss; Memoir of War − Emmanuel Finkiel
Best First Feature Film Shéhérazade − Jean-Bernard Marlin: Little Tickles − Andréa Bescond, Éric Métayer; Custody − Xavier Legrand; L'amour flou − Romane Bohringer, Philippe Rebbot; Sauvage − Camille Vidal-Naquet	Best Cinematography The Sisters Brothers − Benoît Debie: Mademoiselle de Joncquières − Laurent Desmet; Sink or Swim − Laurent Tangy; Memoir of War − Alexis Kavyrchine; Custody − Nathalie Durand
Best Editing Custody − Yorgos Lamprinos: The Trouble with You − Isabelle Devinck; The Sisters Brothers − Juliette Welfling; Little Tickles − Valérie Deseine; Sink or Swim − Simon Jacquet	Best Sound The Sisters Brothers − Cyril Holtz: Custody − Julien Roig, Julien Sicart, Vincent Verdoux; Sink or Swim − Gwennolé Le Borgne; Guy − Antoine Baudouin, Yves-Marie Omnes; Memoir of War − Antoine Mercier, David Vranken, Aline Gavroy
Best Original Music Guy − Romain Greffe, Vincent Blanchard: The Sisters Brothers − Alexandre Desplat; In Safe Hands − Pascal Sangla; An Impossible Love − Grégoire Hetzel; Amanda − Anton Sanko; The Trouble with You − Camille Bazbaz	Best Costume Design Pierre-Jean Larroque − Mademoiselle de Joncquières: Pierre-Yves Gayraud − The Emperor of Paris; Milena Canonero − The Sisters Brothers; Sergio Ballo and Anaïs Romand − Memoir of War; Anaïs Romand − One Nation, One King
Best Production Design The Sisters Brothers − Michel Barthélémy: Memoir of War − Pascal Le Guellec; Mademoiselle de Joncquières − David Faivre; One Nation, One King − Thierry François; The Emperor of Paris − Emile Ghigo	Best Documentary Film So Help Me God − Jean Libon i Yves Hinant: Le grand bal − Laetitia Carton; The State Against Mandela and the Others − Gilles Porte i Nicolas Champeaux; Each and Every Moment − Nicolas Philibert; America − Claus Drexel
Best Animated Feature Film Dilili à Paris − Michel Ocelot: Vilaine fille − Ayce Kartal; Asterix: The Secret of the Magic Potion − d'Alexandre Astier and Louis Clichy; Pachamama − Juan Antin	Best Animated Short Film Vilaine fille − Ayce Kartal: Au coeur des ombres − Alice Eça Guimarães; La mort, père et fils − Denis Walgenwtiz; Raymonde ou l'évasion verticale − Sarah Van Den Boom
Best Short Film Les Petites Mains − Rémi Allier: Les Indes Galantes − Clément Cogitore; Laissez-Moi Danser − Valérie Leroy; Kapitalistis − Pablo Muñoz Gómez; Braguino − Clément Cogitore	Best Foreign Film Shoplifters (Japan) – Directed by Hirokazu Kore-eda: Girl (Belgium) – Directed by Lukas Dhont; Three Billboards Outside Ebbing, Missouri (United States/Great Britain) – Directed by Martin McDonagh; Cold War (Poland) – Directed by Paweł Pawlikowski; Our Struggles (Belgium/France) – Directed by Guillaume Senez; Capernaum (Lebanon) – Directed by Nadine Labaki; Hannah (Italy) – Directed by Andrea Pallaoro
Audience Award Les Tuche 3 d'Olivier Baroux	Honorary César Robert Redford

== See also ==
- 24th Lumière Awards
- 9th Magritte Awards
- 31st European Film Awards
- 91st Academy Awards
- 72nd British Academy Film Awards
