= Globe de Cristal Award for Best Actress =

The Globe de Cristal Award for best actress was first awarded in 2006.

== Winners and nominees ==
=== Best Actress – Motion Picture (2006–2018) ===
Year	Winner and nominees	Film	Director
2006 (1st)
2006 (1st)	Nathalie Baye	The Young Lieutenant	Xavier Beauvois
2006 (1st)	Marion Cotillard	Love Is in the Air	Rémi Bezançon
2006 (1st)	Elsa Zylberstein	Little Jerusalem	Karin Albou
2006 (1st)	Catherine Frot	Boudu	Gérard Jugnot
2006 (1st)	Isabelle Carré	Entre ses mains	Anne Fontaine
2007 (2nd)
2007 (2nd)	Léa Drucker	The Man of My Life	Zabou Breitman
2007 (2nd)	Mélanie Laurent	Don't Worry, I'm Fine	Philippe Lioret
2007 (2nd)	Charlotte Gainsbourg	I Do	Eric Lartigau
2007 (2nd)	Cécile De France	Avenue Montaigne	Danièle Thompson
2007 (2nd)	Marina Hands	Lady Chatterley	Pascale Ferran
2008 (3rd)
2008 (3rd)	Cécile De France	A Secret	Claude Miller
2008 (3rd)	Marion Cotillard	La Vie en rose	Olivier Dahan
2008 (3rd)	Isabelle Carré	Anna M.	Michel Spinosa
2008 (3rd)	Julie Depardieu	A Secret	Claude Miller
2008 (3rd)	Ludivine Sagnier	Love Songs	Christophe Honoré
2009 (4th)
2009 (4th)	Sylvie Testud	Sagan	Diane Kurys
2009 (4th)	Catherine Deneuve	A Christmas Tale	Arnaud Desplechin
2009 (4th)	Nathalie Baye	A French Gigolo	Josiane Balasko
2009 (4th)	Catherine Frot	Mark of an Angel	Safy Nebbou
2009 (4th)	Yolande Moreau	Séraphine	Martin Provost
2010 (5th)
2010 (5th)	Isabelle Adjani	La Journée de la jupe	Jean-Paul Lilienfeld
2010 (5th)	Kristin Scott Thomas	Leaving	Catherine Corsini
2010 (5th)	Chiara Mastroianni	Making Plans for Lena	Christophe Honoré
2010 (5th)	Marie-Josée Croze	Je l'aimais	Zabou Breitman
2010 (5th)	Maïwenn	All About Actresses	Maïwenn
2011 (6th)
2011 (6th)	Kristin Scott Thomas	Sarah's Key	Gilles Paquet-Brenner
2011 (6th)	Géraldine Nakache	Tout ce qui brille	Géraldine Nakache & Hervé Mimran
2011 (6th)	Leïla Bekhti	Tout ce qui brille	Géraldine Nakache & Hervé Mimran
2011 (6th)	Vanessa Paradis	Heartbreaker	Pascal Chaumeil
2011 (6th)	Sara Forestier	The Names of Love	Michel Leclerc
2012 (7th)
2012 (7th)	Karin Viard & Marina Foïs	Polisse	Maïwenn
2012 (7th)	Bérénice Bejo	The Artist	Michel Hazanavicius
2012 (7th)	Marie Gillain	All Our Desires	Philippe Lioret
2012 (7th)	Valérie Donzelli	Declaration of War	Valérie Donzelli
2012 (7th)	Leïla Bekhti	The Source	Radu Mihăileanu
2013 (8th)
2013 (8th)	Marion Cotillard	Rust and Bone	Jacques Audiard
2013 (8th)	Emmanuelle Riva	Amour	Michael Haneke
2013 (8th)	Émilie Dequenne	Our Children	Joachim Lafosse
2013 (8th)	Déborah François	Populaire	Régis Roinsard
2013 (8th)	Izïa	Bad Girl	Patrick Mille
2014 (9th)
2014 (9th)	Adèle Exarchopoulos	Blue Is the Warmest Colour	Abdellatif Kechiche
2014 (9th)	Sandrine Kiberlain	9 Month Stretch	Albert Dupontel
2014 (9th)	Bernadette Lafont	Paulette	Jérôme Enrico
2014 (9th)	Emmanuelle Seigner	Venus in Fur	Roman Polanski
2015 (10th)
2015 (10th)	Aïssa Maïga	Prêt à tout	Nicolas Cuche
2015 (10th)	Marion Cotillard	Two Days, One Night	Dardenne brothers
2015 (10th)	Émilie Dequenne	Not My Type	Lucas Belvaux
2015 (10th)	Adèle Haenel	Love at First Fight	Thomas Cailley
2015 (10th)	Sandrine Kiberlain	Elle L'Adore	Jeanne Herry
2017 (11th)
2017 (11th)	Isabelle Huppert	Elle	Paul Verhoeven
2017 (11th)	Virginie Efira	Up for Love	Laurent Tirard
2017 (11th)	Marion Cotillard	It's Only the End of the World	Xavier Dolan
2017 (11th)	Sandrine Kiberlain	Encore heureux	Benoît Graffin
2017 (11th)	Audrey Tautou	The Odyssey	Jérôme Salle
2018 (12th)
2018 (12th)	Karin Viard	Jalouse	David & Stéphane Foenkinos
2018 (12th)	Juliette Binoche	Let the Sunshine In	Claire Denis
2018 (12th)	Doria Tillier	Mr. & Mrs. Adelman	Nicolas Bedos
2018 (12th)	Catherine Deneuve	The Midwife	Martin Provost
2018 (12th)	Sara Forestier	M	Sara Forestier

=== Best Actress – Drama (2019–) ===
Year	Winner and nominees	Film	Director
2019 (13th)
2019 (13th)	Karin Viard	Little Tickles	Andréa Bescond & Eric Métayer
2019 (13th)	Léa Drucker	Custody	Xavier Legrand
2019 (13th)	Virginie Efira	An Impossible Love	Catherine Corsini
2019 (13th)	Cécile de France	Mademoiselle de Joncquières	Emmanuel Mouret
2019 (13th)	Mélanie Thierry	Memoir of War	Emmanuel Finkiel

=== Best Actress – Comedy (2019–) ===
Year	Winner and nominees	Film	Director
2019 (13th)
2019 (13th)	Alexandra Lamy	Rolling to You	Franck Dubosc
2019 (13th)	Isabelle Adjani	The World Is Yours	Romain Gavras
2019 (13th)	Camille Cottin	Larguées	Eloïse Lang
2019 (13th)	Adèle Haenel	The Trouble with You	Pierre Salvadori
2019 (13th)	Mélanie Laurent	Return of the Hero	Laurent Tirard

== Trivia ==
=== Multiple awards ===
3 awards

- Karin Viard

=== Multiple nominations ===
5 nominations

- Marion Cotillard

3 nominations

- Cécile De France
- Sandrine Kiberlain
- Karin Viard

2 nominations

- Isabelle Adjani
- Nathalie Baye
- Leïla Bekhti
- Isabelle Carré
- Catherine Deneuve
- Émilie Dequenne
- Léa Drucker
- Virginie Efira
- Sara Forestier
- Catherine Frot
- Adèle Haenel
- Mélanie Laurent
- Kristin Scott Thomas

== See also ==
- César Award for Best Actress
