= Lumière Award for Best Music =

Annual French film award

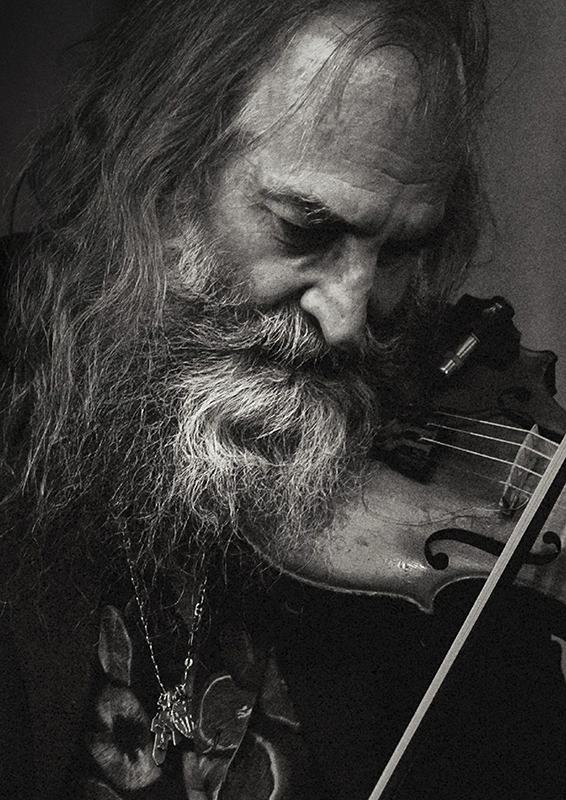
- 2026 co-recipient: Warren Ellis
- Country: France
- Presented by: Académie des Lumières
- First award: 2016
- Currently held by: Warren Ellis, Dom La Nena and Rosemary Standley for Whispers in the Woods (2026)
- Website: academiedeslumieres.com

The Lumière Award for Best Music (French: Lumière de la meilleure musique) is an award presented annually by the Académie des Lumières since 2016.

== Winners and nominees ==
=== 2010s ===
Year	English title	Original title	Composer(s)
2016 (21st)	My Golden Days	Trois souvenirs de ma jeunesse	Grégoire Hetzel
2016 (21st)	Summertime	La Belle Saison	Grégoire Hetzel
2016 (21st)	Diary of a Chambermaid	Journal d'une femme de chambre	Bruno Coulais
2016 (21st)	Mustang		Warren Ellis
2016 (21st)	Disorder	Maryland	Gesaffelstein
2016 (21st)	L'Astragale		Béatrice Thiriet
2016 (21st)	Microbe & Gasoline	Microbe et Gasoil	Jean-Claude Vannier
2017 (22nd)	In the Forests of Siberia	Dans les forêts de Sibérie	Ibrahim Maalouf
2017 (22nd)	My Life as a Courgette	Ma vie de Courgette	Sophie Hunger
2017 (22nd)	The Red Turtle	La Tortue rouge	Laurent Perez del Mar
2017 (22nd)	Planetarium		Robin Coudert
2017 (22nd)	Frantz		Philippe Rombi
2017 (22nd)	It's Only the End of the World	Juste la fin du monde	Gabriel Yared
2018 (23rd)	BPM (Beats per Minute)	120 battements par minute	Arnaud Rebotini
2018 (23rd)	Makala		Gaspar Claus
2018 (23rd)	Step by Step	Patients	Angelo Foley and Grand Corps Malade
2018 (23rd)	Ismael's Ghosts	Les Fantômes d'Ismaël	Grégoire Hetzel
2018 (23rd)	Jeannette: The Childhood of Joan of Arc	Jeannette, l'enfance de Jeanne d'Arc	Igorrr
2018 (23rd)	L'Amant double		Philippe Rombi
2019 (24th)	Guy		Vincent Blanchard and Romain Greffe
2019 (24th)	The Trouble with You	En liberté !	Camille Bazbaz
2019 (24th)	The Sisters Brothers		Alexandre Desplat
2019 (24th)	The Wild Boys	Les Garçons sauvages	Pierre Desprats
2019 (24th)	An Impossible Love	Un amour impossible	Grégoire Hetzel

=== 2020s ===
Year	English title	Original title	Composer(s)
2020 (25th)	Adults in the Room		Alexandre Desplat
2020 (25th)	Atlantics	Atlantique	Fatima Al Qadiri
2020 (25th)	Joan of Arc	Jeanne	Christophe
2020 (25th)	By the Grace of God	Grâce à Dieu	Evgueni Galperine and Sacha Galperine
2020 (25th)	I Lost My Body	J'ai perdu mon corps	Dan Levy
2021 (26th)	Josep		Sílvia Pérez Cruz
2021 (26th)	Calamity, a Childhood of Martha Jane Cannary	Calamity, une enfance de Martha Jane Cannary	Florencia Di Concilio
2021 (26th)	Appearances	Les Apparences	Bertrand Burgalat
2021 (26th)	Marona's Fantastic Tale	L'Extraordinaire Voyage de Marona	Pablo Pico
2021 (26th)	Night Ride	La Nuit venue	Rone
2022 (27th)	Annette		Sparks
2022 (27th)	The Summit of the Gods	Le Sommet des Dieux	Amine Bouhafa
2022 (27th)	The Velvet Queen	La Panthère des neiges	Nick Cave and Warren Ellis
2022 (27th)	Gagarine		Evgueni Galperine, Sacha Galperine and Amine Bouhafa
2022 (27th)	Titane		Jim Williams
2023 (28th)	Flickering Ghosts of Loves Gone By	Et j'aime à la fureur	Benjamin Biolay
2023 (28th)	Full Time	À plein temps	Irène Drésel
2023 (28th)	The Innocent	L'Innocent	Grégoire Hetzel
2023 (28th)	The Night of the 12th	La Nuit du 12	Olivier Marguerit
2023 (28th)	Pacifiction	Pacifiction – Tourment sur les îles	Marc Verdaguer
2024 (29th)	Disco Boy		Vitalic
2024 (29th)	The Animal Kingdom	Le Règne animal	Andrea Laszlo De Simone
2024 (29th)	Chicken for Linda!	Linda veut du poulet !	Clément Ducol
2024 (29th)	Four Daughters	Les Filles d'Olfa	Amine Bouhafa
2024 (29th)	The Mountain	La Montagne	Chloé Thévenin
2025 (30th)	Emilia Pérez		Camille and Clément Ducol
2025 (30th)	And Their Children After Them	Leurs enfants après eux	Amaury Chabauty
2025 (30th)	The Beast	La Bête	Bertrand Bonello and Anna Bonello
2025 (30th)	Ghost Trail	Les Fantômes	Yuksek
2025 (30th)	The Most Precious of Cargoes	La Plus Précieuse des marchandises	Alexandre Desplat
2026 (31st)	Whispers in the Woods	Le Chant des forêts	Warren Ellis, Dom La Nena and Rosemary Standley
2026 (31st)	The Stranger	L'Étranger	Fatima Al Qadiri
2026 (31st)	The Little Sister	La Petite Dernière	Amine Bouhafa
2026 (31st)	A Private Life	Vie privée	Robin Coudert
2026 (31st)	Arco		Arnaud Toulon

== See also ==
- Academy Award for Best Original Score
- BAFTA Award for Best Original Music
- César Award for Best Original Music
- European Film Award for Best Composer
- Golden Globe Award for Best Original Score
- Goya Award for Best Original Score
- Magritte Award for Best Original Score
