= César Award for Best Actress =

Honor awarded in the French film industry

César de la meilleure actrice César Award for Best Actress
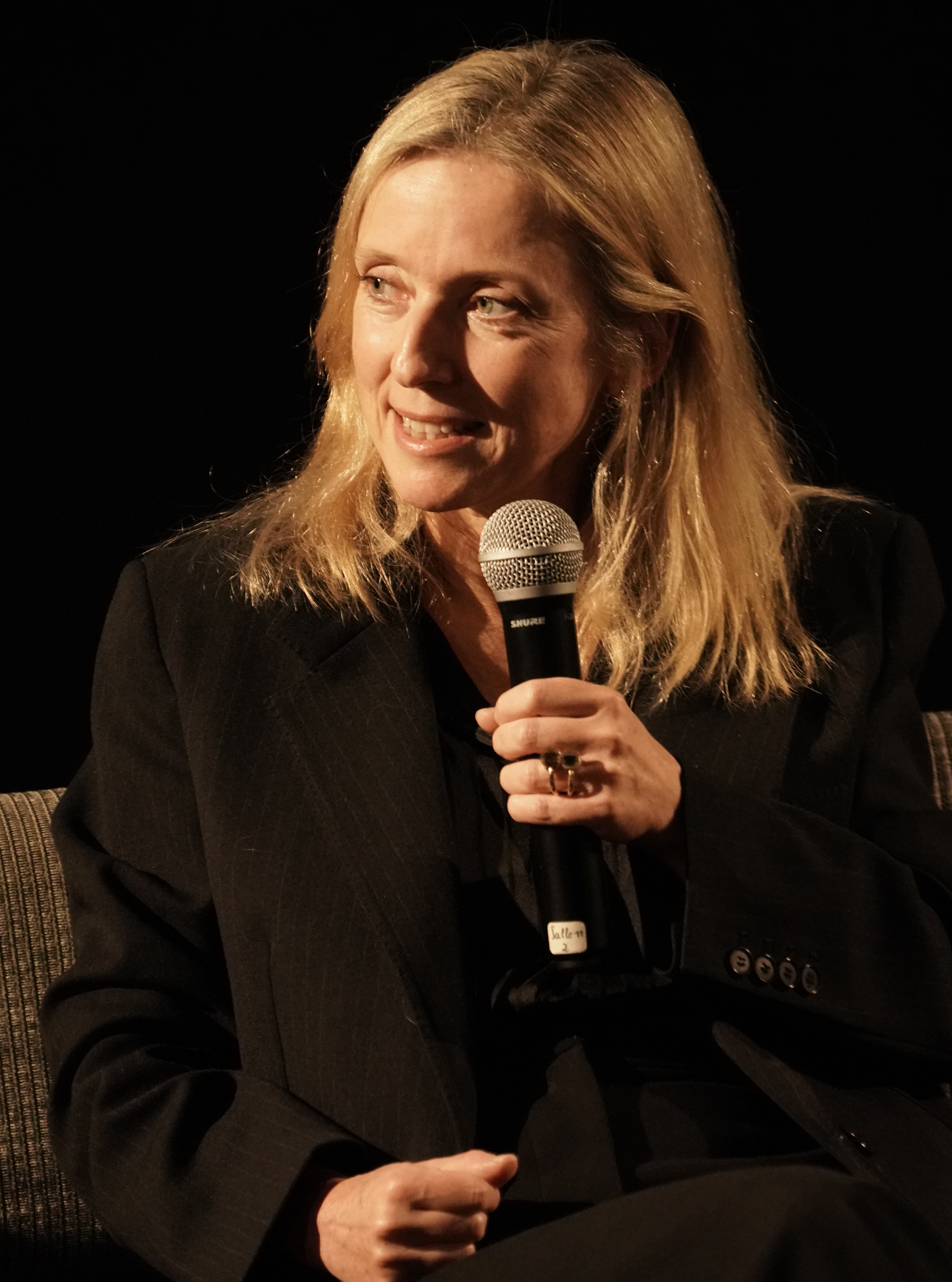
- 2026 recipient: Léa Drucker
- Awarded for: Best Actress in a Leading Role
- Country: France
- Presented by: Académie des Arts et Techniques du Cinéma
- First award: 1976
- Currently held by: Léa Drucker for Case 137 (2026)
- Website: academie-cinema.org

The César Award for Best Actress (French: César de la meilleure actrice) is one of the César Awards, presented annually by the Académie des Arts et Techniques du Cinéma to recognize the outstanding performance in a leading role of an actress who has worked within the French film industry during the year preceding the ceremony. Nominees and winner are selected via a run-off voting by all the members of the Académie.

== Winners and nominees ==
Following the Académie des Arts et Techniques du Cinéma (AATC)'s practice, the films below are listed by year of ceremony, which corresponds to the year following the film's year of release. For example, the César for Best Actress of 2010 was awarded on February 27, 2010, for a performance in a film released between January 1, 2009, and December 31, 2009.

Actresses are selected via a two-round vote: first round to choose the nominees, second round to designate the winner. All the members of the Académie, without regard to their branch, are eligible to vote on both rounds. The number of nominees, initially set to four, was expanded to five in 1984 and then to seven in 2012.

Winners are listed first in bold, followed by the other nominees in alphabetic order.

=== 1970s ===
Year	Winner and Nominees	Film	Original Title	Role(s)
1976 (1st)	**Romy Schneider**	**That Most Important Thing: Love**	**L'Important c'est d'aimer**	**Nadine Chevalier**
1976 (1st)	Isabelle Adjani	The Story of Adele H.	L'Histoire d'Adèle H.	Adèle Hugo
1976 (1st)	Catherine Deneuve	Lovers Like Us	Le Sauvage	Nelly Ratabou
1976 (1st)	Delphine Seyrig	India Song		Anne-Marie Stretter
1977 (2nd)	**Annie Girardot**	**Docteur Françoise Gailland**		**Françoise Gailland**
1977 (2nd)	Isabelle Adjani	Barocco		Laure
1977 (2nd)	Miou-Miou	F comme Fairbanks		Marie
1977 (2nd)	Romy Schneider	Une Femme à sa fenêtre		Margot Santorini
1978 (3rd)	**Simone Signoret**	**Madame Rosa**	**La Vie devant soi**	**Madame Rosa**
1978 (3rd)	Brigitte Fossey	Les Enfants du placard		Juliette
1978 (3rd)	Isabelle Huppert	The Lacemaker	La Dentellière	Pomme
1978 (3rd)	Miou-Miou	This Sweet Sickness	Dites-lui que je l'aime	Juliette
1978 (3rd)	Delphine Seyrig	Repérages		Julie
1979 (4th)	**Romy Schneider**	**A Simple Story**	**Une Histoire simple**	**Marie**
1979 (4th)	Anouk Aimée	Mon premier amour		Jane Romain
1979 (4th)	Annie Girardot	The Key Is in the Door	La Clé sur la porte	Marie Arnault
1979 (4th)	Isabelle Huppert	Violette Nozière		Violette Nozière

=== 1980s ===
Year	Winner and Nominees	Film	Original Title	Role(s)
1980 (5th)	**Miou-Miou**	**Memoirs of a French Whore**	**La Dérobade**	**Marie**
1980 (5th)	Nastassja Kinski	Tess		Tess d'Uberville
1980 (5th)	Dominique Laffin	The Crying Woman	La Femme qui pleure	Dominique
1980 (5th)	Romy Schneider	Clair de femme		Lydia
1981 (6th)	**Catherine Deneuve**	**The Last Metro**	**Le Dernier Métro**	**Marion Steiner**
1981 (6th)	Nathalie Baye	A Week's Vacation	Une Semaine de vacances	Laurence
1981 (6th)	Nicole Garcia	My American Uncle	Mon Oncle d'Amérique	Janine Garnier
1981 (6th)	Isabelle Huppert	Loulou		Nelly
1982 (7th)	**Isabelle Adjani**	**Possession**		**Anna / Helen**
1982 (7th)	Fanny Ardant	The Woman Next Door	La Femme d'à côté	Mathilde Bauchard
1982 (7th)	Catherine Deneuve	Hotel America	Hôtel des Amériques	Hélène
1982 (7th)	Isabelle Huppert	Coup de torchon		Rose Marcaillou
1983 (8th)	**Nathalie Baye**	**La Balance**		**Nicole Danet**
1983 (8th)	Miou-Miou	Josepha		Josepha Manet
1983 (8th)	Romy Schneider (posthumous)	The Passerby	La Passante du Sans-Souci	Elsa Wiener / Lina Baumstein
1983 (8th)	Simone Signoret	L'Étoile du Nord		Madame Baron
1984 (9th)	**Isabelle Adjani**	**One Deadly Summer**	**L'Eté meurtrier**	**Eliane**
1984 (9th)	Fanny Ardant	Confidentially Yours	Vivement dimanche!	Barbara Becker
1984 (9th)	Nathalie Baye	J'ai épousé une ombre		Hélène Georges
1984 (9th)	Nicole Garcia	Les Mots pour le dire		Marie
1984 (9th)	Miou-Miou	Entre Nous	Coup de foudre	Madeleine
1985 (10th)	**Sabine Azéma**	**A Sunday in the Country**	**Un Dimanche à la campagne**	**Irène**
1985 (10th)	Jane Birkin	The Pirate	La Pirate	Alma
1985 (10th)	Valérie Kaprisky	The Public Woman	La Femme publique	Ethel
1985 (10th)	Julia Migenes	Carmen		Carmen
1985 (10th)	Pascale Ogier (posthumous)	Full Moon in Paris	Les Nuits de la pleine lune	Louise
1986 (11th)	**Sandrine Bonnaire**	**Vagabond**	**Sans Toit ni loi**	**Mona Bergeron**
1986 (11th)	Isabelle Adjani	Subway		Helena
1986 (11th)	Juliette Binoche	Rendez-vous		Nina / Anne Larrieux
1986 (11th)	Nicole Garcia	Death in a French Garden	Péril en la demeure	Julia Tombsthay
1986 (11th)	Charlotte Rampling	He Died with His Eyes Open	On ne meurt que deux fois	Barbara Spark
1987 (12th)	**Sabine Azéma**	**Mélo**		**Romaine Belcroix**
1987 (12th)	Juliette Binoche	Mauvais Sang		Anna
1987 (12th)	Jane Birkin	La Femme de ma vie		Laura
1987 (12th)	Béatrice Dalle	Betty Blue	37°2 le matin	Betty
1987 (12th)	Miou-Miou	Ménage	Tenue de soirée	Monique
1988 (13th)	**Anémone**	**The Grand Highway**	**Le Grand Chemin**	**Marcelle**
1988 (13th)	Sandrine Bonnaire	Under the Sun of Satan	Sous le Soleil de Satan	Mouchette
1988 (13th)	Catherine Deneuve	Agent trouble		Amanda Webber
1988 (13th)	Nastassja Kinski	Maladie d'amour		Juliette
1988 (13th)	Jeanne Moreau	The Miracle	Le Miraculé	Sabine
1989 (14th)	**Isabelle Adjani**	**Camille Claudel**		**Camille Claudel**
1989 (14th)	Catherine Deneuve	A Strange Place to Meet	Drôle d'endroit pour une rencontre	France
1989 (14th)	Charlotte Gainsbourg	The Little Thief	La Petite Voleuse	Janine Castang
1989 (14th)	Isabelle Huppert	Story of Women	Une Affaire de femmes	Marie Latour
1989 (14th)	Miou-Miou	The Reader	La Lectrice	Constance / Marie

=== 1990s ===
Year	Winner and Nominees	Film	Original Title	Role(s)
1990 (15th)	**Carole Bouquet**	**Too Beautiful for You**	**Trop belle pour toi**	**Florence Barthélémy**
1990 (15th)	Sabine Azéma	Life and Nothing But	La Vie et rien d'autre	Irène de Courtil
1990 (15th)	Josiane Balasko	Too Beautiful for You	Trop belle pour toi	Colette Chevassu
1990 (15th)	Emmanuelle Béart	Les Enfants du désordre		Marie
1990 (15th)	Sandrine Bonnaire	Monsieur Hire		Alice
1991 (16th)	**Anne Parillaud**	**La Femme Nikita**	**Nikita**	**Nikita**
1991 (16th)	Nathalie Baye	Every Other Weekend	Un week-end sur deux	Camille Valmont
1991 (16th)	Anne Brochet	Cyrano de Bergerac		Roxane
1991 (16th)	Tsilla Chelton	Tatie Danielle		Danielle Billard
1991 (16th)	Miou-Miou	May Fools	Milou en mai	Camille
1992 (17th)	**Jeanne Moreau**	**The Old Lady Who Walked in the Sea**	**La Vielle qui marchait dans la mer**	**Lady M.**
1992 (17th)	Emmanuelle Béart	La Belle Noiseuse		Marianne
1992 (17th)	Juliette Binoche	The Lovers on the Bridge	Les Amants du Pont-Neuf	Michèle STalens
1992 (17th)	Anouk Grinberg	Merci la vie		Joëlle
1992 (17th)	Irène Jacob	The Double Life of Véronique	La double vie de Véronique	Weronika / Véronique
1993 (18th)	**Catherine Deneuve**	**Indochine**		**Eliane Devries**
1993 (18th)	Anémone	Le petit Prince a dit		Mélanie
1993 (18th)	Emmanuelle Béart	A Heart in Winter	Un Cœur en hiver	Camille
1993 (18th)	Juliette Binoche	Damage	Fatale	Anna Barton
1993 (18th)	Caroline Cellier	Le Zèbre		Camille
1994 (19th)	**Juliette Binoche**	**Three Colours: Blue**	**Trois Couleurs: Bleu**	**Julie Vignon de Courcy**
1994 (19th)	Sabine Azéma	Smoking/No Smoking		Célia / Sylvie / Irène / Joséphine
1994 (19th)	Josiane Balasko	Not Everybody's Lucky Enough to Have Communist Parents	Tout le monde n'a pas eu la chance d'avoir des parents communistes	Irène
1994 (19th)	Catherine Deneuve	My Favorite Season	Ma Saison préférée	Emilie
1994 (19th)	Anouk Grinberg	1, 2, 3, Sun	Un, deux, trois, soleil	Victorine
1994 (19th)	Miou-Miou	Germinal		Maheude
1995 (20th)	**Isabelle Adjani**	**Queen Margot**	**La Reine Margot**	**Marguerite de Valois**
1995 (20th)	Anémone	Something Fishy	Pas très catholique	Maxime Chabrier
1995 (20th)	Sandrine Bonnaire	Joan the Maid	Jeanne la Pucelle	Joan of Arc
1995 (20th)	Isabelle Huppert	The Separation	La Séparation	Anne
1995 (20th)	Irène Jacob	Three Colours: Red	Trois Couleurs: Rouge	Valentine Dussaut
1996 (21st)	**Isabelle Huppert**	**The Ceremony**	**La Cérémonie**	**Jeanne**
1996 (21st)	Sabine Azéma	Happiness Is in the Field	Le Bonheur est dans le pré	Nicole Bergeade
1996 (21st)	Emmanuelle Béart	Nelly and Mr. Arnaud	Nelly et Monsieur Arnaud	Nelly
1996 (21st)	Juliette Binoche	The Horseman on the Roof	Le Hussard sur le toit	Pauline de Théus
1996 (21st)	Sandrine Bonnaire	The Ceremony	La Cérémonie	Sophie
1997 (22nd)	**Fanny Ardant**	**Pédale douce**		**Eva**
1997 (22nd)	Catherine Deneuve	Thieves	Les Voleurs	Marie Leblanc
1997 (22nd)	Charlotte Gainsbourg	Love, etc.		Marie
1997 (22nd)	Anouk Grinberg	My Man	Mon Homme	Marie Abarth
1997 (22nd)	Marie Trintignant	Le Cri de la soie		Marie Benjamin
1998 (23rd)	**Ariane Ascaride**	**Marius and Jeannette**	**Marius et Jeannette**	**Jeannette**
1998 (23rd)	Sabine Azéma	Same Old Song	On connaît la chanson	Odile Lalande
1998 (23rd)	Marie Gillain	On Guard	Le Bossu	Aurore de Nevers
1998 (23rd)	Sandrine Kiberlain	Seventh Heaven	Le Septième ciel	Mathilde
1998 (23rd)	Miou-Miou	Dry Cleaning	Nettoyage à sec	Nicole
1999 (24th)	**Élodie Bouchez**	**The Dreamlife of Angels**	**La Vie rêvée des anges**	**Isa**
1999 (24th)	Catherine Deneuve	Place Vendôme		Marianne
1999 (24th)	Isabelle Huppert	The School of Flesh	L'Ecole de la chair	Dominique
1999 (24th)	Sandrine Kiberlain	For Sale	A vendre	France Robert
1999 (24th)	Marie Trintignant	Comme elle respire		Jeanne

=== 2000s ===
Year	Winner and Nominees	Film	Original Title	Role(s)
2000 (25th)	**Karin Viard**	**Haut les cœurs!**		**Emma**
2000 (25th)	Nathalie Baye	Venus Beauty Institute	Vénus Beauté (Institut)	Angèle
2000 (25th)	Sandrine Bonnaire	East/West	Est-Ouest	Marie Golovine
2000 (25th)	Catherine Frot	La Dilettante		Pierrette Dumortier
2000 (25th)	Vanessa Paradis	Girl on the Bridge	La Fille sur le pont	Adèle
2001 (26th)	**Dominique Blanc**	**Stand-by**		**Hélène**
2001 (26th)	Emmanuelle Béart	Sentimental Destinies	Les Destinées sentimentales	Pauline
2001 (26th)	Juliette Binoche	The Widow of Saint-Pierre	La Veuve de Saint-Pierre	Madame La
2001 (26th)	Isabelle Huppert	The King's Daughters	Saint-Cyr	Madame de Maintenon
2001 (26th)	Muriel Robin	Marie-Line		Marie-Line
2002 (27th)	**Emmanuelle Devos**	**Read My Lips**	**Sur mes lèvres**	**Carla Behm**
2002 (27th)	Catherine Frot	Chaos		Hélène
2002 (27th)	Isabelle Huppert	The Piano Teacher	La Pianiste	Erika Kohut
2002 (27th)	Charlotte Rampling	Under the Sand	Sous le sable	Marie Drillon
2002 (27th)	Audrey Tautou	Amélie	Le Fabuleux destin d'Amélie Poulain	Amélie Poulain
2003 (28th)	**Isabelle Carré**	**Beautiful Memories**	**Se Souvenir des belles choses**	**Claire Poussin**
2003 (28th)	Fanny Ardant	8 Women	Huit Femmes	Pierrette
2003 (28th)	Ariane Ascaride	Marie-Jo and Her Two Lovers	Marie-Jo et ses deux amours	Marie-Jo
2003 (28th)	Juliette Binoche	Jet Lag	Décalage horaire	Rose
2003 (28th)	Isabelle Huppert	8 Women	Huit Femmes	Augustine
2004 (29th)	**Sylvie Testud**	**Fear and Trembling**	**Stupeur et tremblements**	**Amélie Nothomb**
2004 (29th)	Josiane Balasko	That Woman	Cette femme-là	Michèle Varin
2004 (29th)	Nathalie Baye	Feelings	Les Sentiments	Carole
2004 (29th)	Isabelle Carré	Feelings	Les Sentiments	Edith
2004 (29th)	Charlotte Rampling	Swimming Pool		Sarah Morton
2005 (30th)	**Yolande Moreau**	**When the Sea Rises**	**Quand la mer monte...**	**Irène**
2005 (30th)	Maggie Cheung	Clean		Emily
2005 (30th)	Emmanuelle Devos	Kings and Queen	Rois et reine	Nora
2005 (30th)	Audrey Tautou	A Very Long Engagement	Un long dimanche de fiançailles	Mathilde
2005 (30th)	Karin Viard	The Role of Her Life	Le Rôle de sa vie	Claire Rocher
2006 (31st)	**Nathalie Baye**	**The Young Lieutenant**	**Le petit lieutenant**	**Commandant Vaudieu**
2006 (31st)	Isabelle Carré	Entre ses mains		Claire Gauthier
2006 (31st)	Anne Consigny	Not Here to Be Loved	Je ne suis pas là pour être aimé	Françoise Rubion
2006 (31st)	Isabelle Huppert	Gabrielle		Gabrielle Hervey
2006 (31st)	Valérie Lemercier	Palais royal!		Princesse Armelle
2007 (32nd)	**Marina Hands**	**Lady Chatterley**		**Lady Chatterley**
2007 (32nd)	Cécile de France	Avenue Montaigne	Fauteuils d'orchestre	Jessica
2007 (32nd)	Cécile de France	When I Was a Singer	Quand j'étais chanteur	Marion
2007 (32nd)	Catherine Frot	The Page Turner	La Tourneuse de pages	Ariane Fouchécourt
2007 (32nd)	Charlotte Gainsbourg	I Do	Prête-moi ta main	Emma
2008 (33rd)	**Marion Cotillard**	**La Vie en Rose**	**La môme**	**Edith Piaf**
2008 (33rd)	Isabelle Carré	Anna M.		Anna M.
2008 (33rd)	Cécile de France	A Secret	Un Secret	Tania
2008 (33rd)	Marina Foïs	Darling		Catherine Nicolle a.k.a. Darling
2008 (33rd)	Catherine Frot	Odette Toulemonde		Odette Toulemonde
2009 (34th)	**Yolande Moreau**	**Séraphine**		**Séraphine Louis**
2009 (34th)	Catherine Frot	Le crime est notre affaire		Prudence Beresford
2009 (34th)	Kristin Scott Thomas	I've Loved You So Long	Il y a longtemps que je t'aime	Juliette Fontaine
2009 (34th)	Tilda Swinton	Julia		Julia
2009 (34th)	Sylvie Testud	Sagan		Françoise Sagan

=== 2010s ===
Year	Winner and Nominees	Film	Original Title	Role(s)
2010 (35th)	**Isabelle Adjani**	**Skirt Day**	**La Journée de la jupe**	**Sonia Bergerac**
2010 (35th)	Dominique Blanc	The Other One	L'Autre	Anne-Marie
2010 (35th)	Sandrine Kiberlain	Mademoiselle Chambon		Véronique Chambon
2010 (35th)	Kristin Scott Thomas	Leaving	Partir	Suzanne
2010 (35th)	Audrey Tautou	Coco Before Chanel	Coco avant Chanel	Gabrielle Chanel
2011 (36th)	**Sara Forestier**	**The Names of Love**	**Le Nom des gens**	**Bahia Benmahmoud**
2011 (36th)	Isabelle Carré	Romantics Anonymous	Les Emotifs anonymes	Angélique
2011 (36th)	Catherine Deneuve	Potiche		Suzanne Pujol
2011 (36th)	Charlotte Gainsbourg	The Tree	L'Arbre	Dawn O'Neil
2011 (36th)	Kristin Scott Thomas	Sarah's Key	Elle s'appelait Sarah	Julia Jarmond
2012 (37th)	**Bérénice Bejo**	**The Artist**		**Peppy Miller**
2012 (37th)	Ariane Ascaride	The Snows of Kilimanjaro	Les Neiges du Kilimandjaro	Marie-Claire
2012 (37th)	Leïla Bekhti	The Source	La Source des femmes	Leïla
2012 (37th)	Valérie Donzelli	Declaration of War	La Guerre est déclarée	Juliette
2012 (37th)	Marina Foïs	Polisse		Iris
2012 (37th)	Marie Gillain	All Our Desires	Toutes nos envies	Claire
2012 (37th)	Karin Viard	Polisse		Nadine
2013 (38th)	**Emmanuelle Riva**	**Amour**		**Anne Laurent**
2013 (38th)	Marion Cotillard	Rust and Bone	De rouille et d'os	Stéphanie
2013 (38th)	Catherine Frot	Haute Cuisine	Les saveurs du Palais	Hortense Laborie
2013 (38th)	Noémie Lvovsky	Camille Rewinds	Camille redouble	Camille Vaillant
2013 (38th)	Corinne Masiero	Louise Wimmer		Louise Wimmer
2013 (38th)	Léa Seydoux	Farewell, My Queen	Les Adieux à la Reine	Sidonie Laborde
2013 (38th)	Hélène Vincent	A Few Hours of Spring	Quelques heures de printemps	Yvette Évrard
2014 (39th)	**Sandrine Kiberlain**	**9 Month Stretch**	**9 mois ferme**	**Ariane Felder**
2014 (39th)	Fanny Ardant	Bright Days Ahead	Les Beaux Jours	Caroline
2014 (39th)	Bérénice Bejo	The Past	Le Passé	Marie Brisson
2014 (39th)	Catherine Deneuve	On My Way	Elle s'en va	Bettie
2014 (39th)	Sara Forestier	Suzanne		Suzanne
2014 (39th)	Emmanuelle Seigner	Venus in Fur	La Vénus à la fourrure	Vanda
2014 (39th)	Léa Seydoux	Blue Is the Warmest Colour	La Vie d'Adèle – Chapitres 1 & 2	Emma
2015 (40th)	**Adèle Haenel**	**Love at First Fight**	**Les Combattants**	**Madeleine**
2015 (40th)	Juliette Binoche	Clouds of Sils Maria	Sils Maria	Maria Enders
2015 (40th)	Marion Cotillard	Two Days, One Night	Deux Jours, Une Nuit	Sandra Bya
2015 (40th)	Catherine Deneuve	In the Courtyard	Dans la cour	Mathilde
2015 (40th)	Émilie Dequenne	Not My Type	Pas son genre	Jennifer
2015 (40th)	Sandrine Kiberlain	Elle l'adore		Muriel Bayen
2015 (40th)	Karin Viard	The Bélier Family	La Famille Bélier	Gigi Bélier
2016 (41st)	**Catherine Frot**	**Marguerite**		**Marguerite Dumont**
2016 (41st)	Loubna Abidar	Much Loved		Noha
2016 (41st)	Emmanuelle Bercot	Mon roi		Tony
2016 (41st)	Cécile de France	Summertime	La Belle Saison	Carole
2016 (41st)	Catherine Deneuve	Standing Tall	La Tête haute	Florence Blaque
2016 (41st)	Isabelle Huppert	Valley of Love		Isabelle
2016 (41st)	Soria Zeroual	Fatima		Fatima
2017 (42nd)	**Isabelle Huppert**	**Elle**		**Michèle Leblanc**
2017 (42nd)	Judith Chemla	A Woman's Life	Une vie	Jeanne du Perthuis des Vauds
2017 (42nd)	Marion Cotillard	From the Land of the Moon	Mal de pierres	Gabrielle
2017 (42nd)	Virginie Efira	In Bed with Victoria	Victoria	Victoria Spick
2017 (42nd)	Marina Foïs	Faultless	Irréprochable	Constance
2017 (42nd)	Sidse Babett Knudsen	150 Milligrams	La Fille de Brest	Irène Frachon
2017 (42nd)	Soko	The Dancer	La Danseuse	Loie Fuller
2018 (43rd)	**Jeanne Balibar**	**Barbara**		**Brigitte**
2018 (43rd)	Juliette Binoche	Let the Sunshine In	Un beau soleil intérieur	Isabelle
2018 (43rd)	Emmanuelle Devos	Number One	Numéro une	Emmanuelle Blachey
2018 (43rd)	Marina Foïs	The Workshop	L'Atelier	Olivia
2018 (43rd)	Charlotte Gainsbourg	Promise at Dawn	La Promesse de l’aube	Nina Kacew
2018 (43rd)	Doria Tillier	Mr. & Mrs. Adelman	Monsieur & Madame Adelman	Sarah Adelman
2018 (43rd)	Karin Viard	Jalouse		Nathalie Pécheux
2019 (44th)	**Léa Drucker**	**Custody**	**Jusqu'à la garde**	**Miriam Besson**
2019 (44th)	Élodie Bouchez	In Safe Hands	Pupille	Alice
2019 (44th)	Cécile de France	Mademoiselle de Joncquières		Madame de La Pommeraye
2019 (44th)	Virginie Efira	An Impossible Love	Un amour impossible	Rachel Schwartz
2019 (44th)	Adèle Haenel	The Trouble with You	En liberté !	Yvonne Santi
2019 (44th)	Sandrine Kiberlain	In Safe Hands	Pupille	Karine
2019 (44th)	Mélanie Thierry	Memoir of War	La douleur	Marguerite Duras

=== 2020s ===
Year	Winner and Nominees	Film	Original Title	Role(s)
2020 (45th)	**Anaïs Demoustier**	**Alice and the Mayor**	**Alice et le Maire**	**Alice Heimann**
2020 (45th)	Eva Green	Proxima		Sarah Loreau
2020 (45th)	Adèle Haenel	Portrait of a Lady on Fire	Portrait de la jeune fille en feu	Héloïse
2020 (45th)	Noémie Merlant	Portrait of a Lady on Fire	Portrait de la jeune fille en feu	Marianne
2020 (45th)	Chiara Mastroianni	On a Magical Night	Chambre 212	Maria Mortemart
2020 (45th)	Doria Tillier	La Belle Époque		Margot
2020 (45th)	Karin Viard	The Perfect Nanny	Chanson douce	Louise
2021 (46th)	**Laure Calamy**	**My Donkey, My Lover & I**	**Antoinette Dans Les Cévennes**	**Antoinette Lapouge**
2021 (46th)	Martine Chevallier	Two of Us	Deux	Madeleine Girard
2021 (46th)	Virginie Efira	Bye Bye Morons		Suze Trappet
2021 (46th)	Camélia Jordana	Love Affair(s)	Les Choses qu'on dit, les choses qu'on fait	Daphné
2021 (46th)	Barbara Sukowa	Two of Us	Deux	Nina Dorn
2022 (47th)	**Valérie Lemercier**	**Aline**		**Aline Dieu**
2022 (47th)	Leïla Bekhti	The Restless	Les intranquilles	Leïla
2022 (47th)	Valeria Bruni Tedeschi	The Divide	La fracture	Raphaëlle Catania dite Raf
2022 (47th)	Laure Calamy	Her Way	Une femme du monde	Marie Kriegel
2022 (47th)	Virginie Efira	Benedetta		Benedetta Carlini
2022 (47th)	Vicky Krieps	Hold Me Tight	Serre moi fort	Clarisse
2022 (47th)	Léa Seydoux	France		France de Meurs
2023 (48th)	**Virginie Efira**	**Paris Memories**	**Revoir Paris**	**Mia**
2023 (48th)	Fanny Ardant	The Young Lovers	Les jeunes amants	Shauna Loszinsky
2023 (48th)	Juliette Binoche	Between Two Worlds	Ouistreham	Marianne Winckler
2023 (48th)	Laure Calamy	Full Time	À plein temps	Julie Roy
2023 (48th)	Adèle Exarchopoulos	Zero Fucks Given	Rien à foutre	Cassandre
2024 (49th)	**Sandra Hüller**	**Anatomy of a Fall**	**Anatomie d'une chute**	**Sandra Voyter**
2024 (49th)	Marion Cotillard	Little Girl Blue		Carole Achache
2024 (49th)	Léa Drucker	Last Summer	L'Été dernier	Anne
2024 (49th)	Virginie Efira	Just the Two of Us	L'Amour et les Forêts	Blanche and Rose
2024 (49th)	Hafsia Herzi	The Rapture	Le Ravissement	Lydia
2025 (50th)	**Hafsia Herzi**	**Borgo**		**Mélissa Dahleb**
2025 (50th)	Adèle Exarchopoulos	Beating Hearts	L'Amour ouf	Jackie
2025 (50th)	Karla Sofía Gascón	Emilia Pérez		Emilia Pérez / Juan "Manitas" Del Monte
2025 (50th)	Zoe Saldaña	Emilia Pérez		Rita Mora Castro
2025 (50th)	Hélène Vincent	When Fall Is Coming	LQuand vient l'automne	Michelle
2026 (51st)	**Léa Drucker**	**Case 137**	**Dossier 137**	**Stéphanie Bertrand**
2026 (51st)	Isabelle Huppert	The Richest Woman in the World	La femme la plus riche du monde	Marianne Farrère
2026 (51st)	Leïla Bekhti	Once Upon My Mother	Ma mère, Dieu et Sylvie Vartan	Esther Perez
2026 (51st)	Mélanie Thierry	Mariana’s Room	La chambre de Mariana	Mariana
2026 (51st)	Valeria Bruni Tedeschi	The Ties That Bind Us	L'Attachement	Sandra Ferney

== History ==
=== Superlatives ===
Superlative	Best Actress		Best Supporting Actress		Overall (including Most Promising Actress)	
Actress with most awards	Isabelle Adjani	5	Dominique Blanc	3	Isabelle Adjani	5
Actress with most nominations	Isabelle Huppert	15	Noémie Lvovsky; Karin Viard	6	Isabelle Huppert	17
Actress with most nominations without ever winning	Emmanuelle Béart; Charlotte Gainsbourg; Cécile de France	5	Noémie Lvovsky	6	Noémie Lvovsky	7
Film with most nominations	8 Women; La Cérémonie; Feelings; In Safe Hands; Polisse; Too Beautiful for You Two of Us	2	All Your Faces	4	8 Women All Your Faces; Polisse; Venus Beauty Institute	4
Oldest winner	Emmanuelle Riva	85	Suzanne Flon	72	Emmanuelle Riva	85
Oldest nominee	Emmanuelle Riva	85	Claude Gensac	87	Claude Gensac	87
Youngest winner	Sandrine Bonnaire	18	Déborah Lukumuena	22	Charlotte Gainsbourg	14
Youngest nominee	Charlotte Gainsbourg	17	Christine Pascal	22	Charlotte Gainsbourg	14

As of 2019, 82 actresses have been nominated in the category, with a total of 34 different winners. The average age at first nomination is 36 and the average age of winners at first win is 39.

With five wins (1982, 1984, 1989, 1995, 2010), Isabelle Adjani has the most Best Actress Césars. Seven actresses have won two Best Actress Césars: Romy Schneider (1976, 1979), Sabine Azéma (1985, 1987), Catherine Deneuve (1981, 1993), Nathalie Baye (1983, 2006), Yolande Moreau (2005, 2009), Isabelle Huppert (1996, 2017) and Léa Drucker (2019, 2026).

Adjani also holds the records for most César Awards in an acting category and for most Césars in a single artistic category. She is followed with 4 Césars by Dominique Blanc (1 Best Actress César and 3 Best Supporting Actress Césars) and Nathalie Baye (2 Best Actress Césars and 2 Best Supporting Actress Césars).

Isabelle Huppert holds the record of most nominations with 14. Including Best Supporting Actress, Huppert has been nominated a total of 16 times, which makes her the overall most-nominated female performer.

Virginie Efira hold the record of most consecutive nominations with 4 (2021, 2022, 2023 and 2024).

Cécile de France is the only actress to have been nominated for two different roles the same year, in 2007 for Avenue Montaigne and for When I Was a Singer. The Académie has since modified the nomination rules to ensure that no one could receive more than one individual nomination by category.

Eight women have won both the César Award for Best Actress and the César Award for Best Supporting Actress:

- Nathalie Baye (Best Supporting Actress in 1981 and 1982, Best Actress in 1983 and 2006)
- Annie Girardot (Best Actress in 1977, Best Supporting Actress in 1996 and 2002),
- Dominique Blanc (Best Supporting Actress in 1991, 1993 and 1999, Best Actress in 2001),
- Karin Viard (Best Actress in 2000, Best Supporting Actress in 2003 and 2019),
- Marion Cotillard (Best Supporting Actress in 2005, Best Actress in 2008),
- Emmanuelle Devos (Best Actress in 2002, Best Supporting Actress in 2010),
- Adèle Haenel (Best Supporting Actress in 2014, Best Actress in 2015),
- Catherine Frot (Best Supporting Actress in 1997, Best Actress in 2016),
- Fanny Ardant (Best Actress in 1997, Best Supporting Actress in 2020).

Nathalie Baye is the only actress with multiple wins in both categories. She is also the only performer to have won an acting César in three consecutive years, in 1981, 1982 and 1983.

Three films have received both accolades: One Deadly Summer in 1984 (Best Actress to Isabelle Adjani, Best Supporting Actress to Suzanne Flon), Indochine in 1993 (Best Actress to Catherine Deneuve, Best Supporting Actress to Dominique Blanc) and Queen Margot in 1995 (Best Actress to Isabelle Adjani, Best Supporting Actress to Virna Lisi).

Six women have won the César Award for Best Actress after previously winning the César Award for Most Promising Actress:

- Sandrine Bonnaire (Most Promising Actress in 1984, Best Actress in 1986),
- Élodie Bouchez (Most Promising Actress in 1995, Best Actress in 1999),
- Sylvie Testud (Most Promising Actress in 2001, Best Actress in 2004),
- Sara Forestier (Most Promising Actress in 2004, Best Actress in 2011),
- Sandrine Kiberlain (Most Promising Actress in 1996, Best Actress in 2014),
- Hafsia Herzi (Most Promising Actress in 2008; Best Actress in 2025).

Only one film has received both accolades: The Dreamlife of Angels in 1999 (Best Actress to Élodie Bouchez, Most Promising Actress to Natacha Régnier).

Thirteen women have received nominations in the three competitive acting categories: Best Actress, Best Supporting Actress and Most Promising Actress. They are Emmanuelle Béart, Charlotte Gainsbourg, Dominique Blanc, Anne Brochet, Karin Viard, Sandrine Kiberlain, Emmanuelle Devos, Cécile de France, Marion Cotillard, Sylvie Testud, Émilie Dequenne, Sara Forestier and Adèle Haenel. So far, no actress has achieved to win the three awards.

To date, the longest-living winner is Emmanuelle Riva, who died at 89, and the most short-lived is Romy Schneider, who died at 43. The oldest alive winner is Catherine Deneuve, aged 77, and the earliest alive winner is Miou-Miou (Memoirs of a French Whore, 1980).

=== Posthumous nominations ===
There have been only two posthumous nominations for any acting César and both occurred in the Best Actress category. Romy Schneider was nominated in 1983 for The Passerby, seven months after her death possibly by suicide. Pascale Ogier died of a drug overdose at 25, three months before receiving a nomination for Full Moon in Paris in 1985.

Romy Schneider is the only actress to have been presented a posthumous Honorary César, in 2008. Actor Alain Delon presented the César, as the date also corresponded to the forty years of the iconic film La Piscine in which they starred together. During the standing ovation, he turned towards a giant portrait of the actress and declared in German that she was the love of his life.

=== International presence ===
As the César Awards are centered on the French Cinema, the majority of recipients are French and performed in French language. The non-French winners of the Best Actress César include Belgian actress Yolande Moreau (2005, 2009) and German actress Sandra Hüller (2024). Romy Schneider was born German, Virginie Efira was born Belgian and Bérénice Bejo was born Argentine, but all had become French naturalized citizens by the time of their wins.

International actresses who have received nominations are:

- Algeria: Soria Zeroual
- Argentina: Bérénice Bejo
- Belgium: Cécile de France, Marie Gillain, Yolande Moreau, Émilie Dequenne and Virginie Efira
- Denmark: Sidse Babett Knudsen,
- Germany: Nastassja Kinski, Barbara Sukowa and Sandra Hüller
- Hong Kong: Maggie Cheung
- Luxembourg: Vicky Krieps
- Morocco: Loubna Abidar
- Spain: Karla Sofia Gascón
- Switzerland: Irène Jacob
- United Kingdom: Jane Birkin, Charlotte Rampling, Tilda Swinton and Kristin Scott Thomas
- United States: Julia Migenes and Zoe Saldaña

The Best Actress César has been awarded twice for a foreign-language performance: to Isabelle Adjani for her English-language performance in Possession (1982) and to Sylvie Testud for her Japanese-language performance in Fear and Trembing (2004). In addition, Bérénice Bejo is the only performer in the history of the César to receive an award for a silent role, in The Artist (2012).

=== Multiple wins and nominations ===
The following individuals received two or more Best Actress awards:

Wins	Actress
5	Isabelle Adjani
2	Isabelle Huppert
2	Catherine Deneuve
2	Nathalie Baye
2	Sabine Azéma
2	Léa Drucker
2	Romy Schneider
2	Yolande Moreau

The following individuals received three or more Best Actress nominations:

Nominations	Actress
15	Isabelle Huppert
13	Catherine Deneuve
11	Juliette Binoche
10	Miou-Miou
8	Isabelle Adjani
7	Nathalie Baye
7	Catherine Frot
6	Fanny Ardant
6	Sabine Azéma
6	Sandrine Bonnaire
6	Virginie Efira
6	Sandrine Kiberlain
6	Karin Viard
5	Emmanuelle Béart
5	Isabelle Carré
5	Marion Cotillard
5	Cécile de France
5	Charlotte Gainsbourg
5	Romy Schneider
4	Marina Foïs
3	Anémone
3	Ariane Ascaride
3	Josiane Balasko
3	Laure Calamy
3	Emmanuelle Devos
3	Léa Drucker
3	Nicole Garcia
3	Anouk Grinberg
3	Adèle Haenel
3	Charlotte Rampling
3	Kristin Scott Thomas
3	Léa Seydoux
3	Audrey Tautou

== See also ==
- Lumière Award for Best Actress
- Magritte Award for Best Actress
- European Film Award for Best Actress
- Academy Award for Best Actress
- Nastro d'Argento for Best Actress
- BAFTA Award for Best Actress
- David di Donatello for Best Actress
- Goya Award for Best Actress
