= Léa Drucker =

French actress (born 1972)

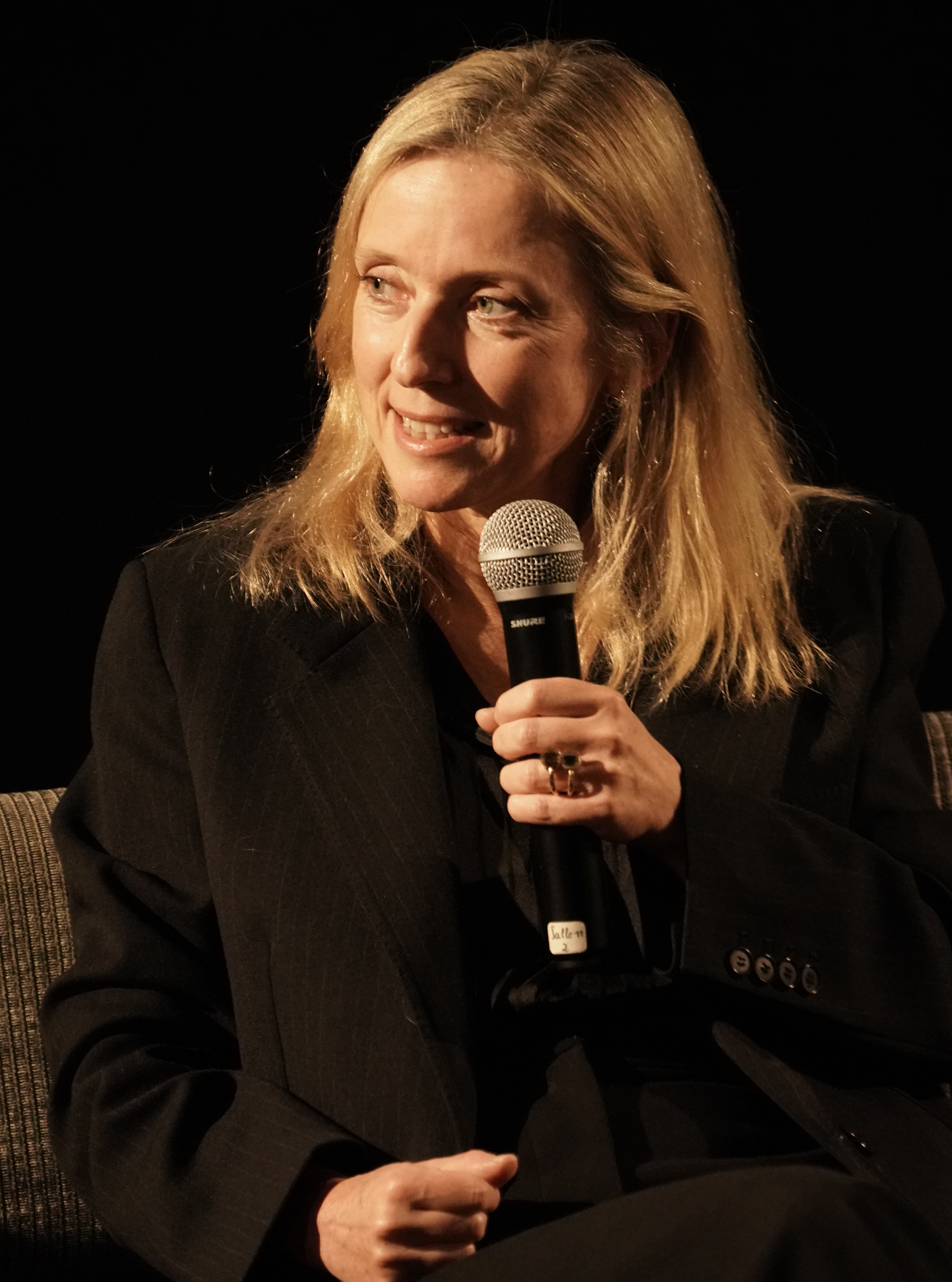
- Drucker in 2024
- Born: 23 January 1972 (age 54); Caen, France
- Occupation: Actress
- Years active: 1991–present
- Partner: Julien Rambaldi
- Children: 1
- Relatives: Marie Drucker (cousin); Jean Drucker (uncle); Michel Drucker (uncle)

Léa Drucker (French: [lea dʁykɛʁ]; born 23 January 1972) is a French actress. She played Catherine Durand in the French-British television series War of the Worlds. She won two César Awards for Best Actress for portraying an abused woman in Custody (2017) and a dedicated IGPN investigator in Case 137 (2025).

== Early life ==
Born in Caen, Normandy, Drucker is the niece of television presenter Michel Drucker, and of ex-president of M6 Jean Drucker. Her father Jacques is a medical doctor, and her mother, Martine, an English teacher. She is the cousin of the journalist Marie Drucker. Her paternal grandfather was a Romanian Jewish immigrant.

Drucker studied acting at the École de la rue Blanche, the École Nationale Supérieure des Arts et Techniques du Théâtre (ENSATT) in Paris.

== Career ==
Drucker's early career encompassed both classical theatre pieces like Le Misanthrope, and contemporary plays such as Blanc by Emmanuelle Marie.

Drucker has been twice nominated for the Molière Award for Best Female Revelation, in 2001 for her role in Danny et la grande bleue and in 2004 for 84 Charing Cross Road. In 2017, she starred in Xavier Legrand's domestic abuse drama Custody, which premiered in competition at the 74th Venice International Film Festival. For her performance, she won Best Actress at the 44th César Awards.

In 2019, Drucker began her first work in English-language television, starring as Catherine Durand in three seasons (24 episodes) of the StudioCanal French-British television series War of the Worlds (2019–2022), alongside Gabriel Byrne and Daisy Edgar-Jones.

In 2025, Drucker starred in Dominik Moll's crime drama Case 137, which premiered in competition at the 78th Cannes Film Festival. For her performance, she won her second César Award for Best Actress, and received a nomination for the European Film Award for Best Actress.

== Personal life ==
Drucker is in a relationship with director and screenwriter Julien Rambaldi. They have one daughter, born in July 2014.

== Filmography ==
=== Films ===
Year	Title	Role	Director	Notes
1991	La thune	Edwige's friend	Philippe Galland	
1992	List of Merite	Solange	Charles Nemes	
1993	Colis d'oseille	Alice	Yves Lafaye	TV movie
1995	Raï	Girl at the party	Thomas Gilou	
1995	Ah les femmes	Emmanuelle	Nicolas Hourès	Short
1997	Assassin(s)	Léa	Mathieu Kassovitz	
1997	Bouge!	Nathalie	Jérôme Cornuau	
1998	L'annonce faite à Marius	Brigitte	Harmel Sbraire	
1999	Peut-être	Clotilde	Cédric Klapisch	
1999	Mes amis	Gilda	Michel Hazanavicius	
1999	Un pur moment de rock'n roll	Florence	Manuel Boursinhac	
1999	Fait d'hiver		Robert Enrico	
1999	La vie ne me fait pas peur		Noémie Lvovsky	
2001	Chaos	Nicole	Coline Serreau	
2002	In My Skin	Sandrine	Marina de Van	
2002	Hypnotized and Hysterical (Hairstylist Wanted)	Coraline	Claude Duty	
2002	3 zéros	Debby	Fabien Onteniente	
2002	Papillons de nuit	Roberta	John Pepper	
2002	Pourkoi... passkeu	She	Tristan Aurouet & Gilles Lellouche	Short
2003	Bienvenue au gîte	Agnès	Claude Duty	
2003	Concours de circonstance	The woman	Mabrouk El Mechri	Short
2004	Narco	The binoculars	Tristan Aurouet & Gilles Lellouche	
2004	À quoi ça sert de voter écolo ?	Camille	Aure Atika	Short
2004	Illustre inconnue	The hairdresser	Marc Fitoussi	Short
2004	Du bois pour l'hiver	Paul's wife	Olivier Jahan	Short
2005	Virgil	Margot	Mabrouk El Mechri	
2005	Akoibon	The tourist	Édouard Baer	
2005	Dans tes rêves	Jenny	Denis Thybaud	
2006	The Man of My Life	Frédérique	Zabou Breitman	
2006	The Tiger Brigades	Léa	Jérôme Cornuau	
2006	2 filles	A girl	Lola Doillon	Short
2006	La blonde au bois dormant	Estelle Fenelon	Sébastien Grall	TV movie
2007	Tel père telle fille	Alice	Olivier De Plas	
2007	Faits divers	Marie	Bill Barluet	Short
2007	J'ai plein de projets	The woman at the door	Karim Adda	Short
2007	Divine Émilie	Émilie du Châtelet	Arnaud Sélignac	TV movie
2008	Coluche: l'histoire d'un mec	Véronique Colucci	Antoine de Caunes	
2008	Le bruit des gens autour	Kate	Diastème	
2008	Animal singulier	Suzanne	Hélène Guétary	Short
2009	Cyprien	Héléna	David Charhon	
2010	Pièce montée	Hélène	Denys Granier-Deferre	
2010	Les meilleurs amis du monde	Mathilde	Julien Rambaldi	
2010	Pauline et François	Catherine	Renaud Fely	
2010	A vos caisses!	Marie-Jo	Pierre Isoard	TV movie
2011	Jeanne Devère	Jeanne Devère	Marcel Bluwal	TV movie
2012	Je me suis fait tout petit	Ariane	Cécilia Rouaud	
2012	La vérité si je mens 3	Muriel Salomon	Thomas Gilou	
2012	Crapuleuses	Pascale	Magaly Richard-Serrano	TV movie
2013	The Big Bad Wolf	Patricia Delcroix	Nicolas & Bruno	
2013	Je suis supporter du Standard	Martine	Riton Liebman	
2013	Just Before Losing Everything	Miriam	Xavier Legrand	Short; Nominated for the Academy Award for Best Live Action Short Film
2014	The Blue Room	Delphine Gahyde	Mathieu Amalric	
2014	Au nom des fils	Odile Chasseuil	Christian Faure	TV movie
2014	Des Roses en Hiver	Elsa	Lorenzo Gabriele	TV movie
2015	Stop Me Here	Louise Lablache	Gilles Bannier	
2015	Pierre Brossolette ou les passagers de la lune	Gilberte	Coline Serreau	TV movie
2016	News from Planet Mars	Myriam	Dominik Moll	
2017	The Teacher	Caroline	Olivier Ayache-Vidal	
2017	La Consolation	Gigi	Magaly Richard-Serrano	TV movie
2017	Custody	Miriam Besson	Xavier Legrand	
2018	Place publique	Nathalie	Agnès Jaoui	
2019	Roxane	Anne-Marie Leroux	Mélanie Auffret	
2019	Synonyms	French Teacher	Nadav Lapid	
2019	Je promets d'être sage	Sybille Dermaux	Ronan Le Page	
2019	La sainte famille	Marie	Louis-Do de Lencquesaing	
2019	Two of Us	Anne	Filippo Meneghetti	Shortlisted for the Academy Award for Best International Feature Film
2020	Vulnérables	Elsa	Arnaud Sélignac	TV movie
2020	C'est la vie	Manon Laval	Julien Rambaldi	
2021	Petite Solange	Aurélia Maserati	Axelle Ropert	
2021	Chère Léa	Harriet	Jérôme Bonnell	
2021	Adieu Paris	L'auxiliaire de vie d'Alain	Édouard Baer	
2022	Incredible but True	Marie Duval	Quentin Dupieux	
2022	Le monde d'hier	Isabelle de Raincy	Diastème	
2022	Close	Nathalie	Lukas Dhont	Nominated for the Academy Award for Best International Feature Film
2022	Les femmes du square	Hélène	Julien Rambaldi	
2022	Couleurs de l'incendie	Madeleine Péricourt	Clovis Cornillac	
2023	Last Summer	Anne	Catherine Breillat	
2023	Mars Express	Aline Ruby	Jérémie Périn	Voice
2024	Auction	Bettina	Pascal Bonitzer	
2025	Case 137	Stéphanie Bertrand	Dominik Moll	
2025	Adam's Interest	Lucy	Laura Wandel	
2026	A Woman's Life		Charline Bourgeois-Tacquet	

=== TV series ===
Year	Title	Role	Director	Notes
1992	Chien et chat	The cashier	Philippe Galland	1 episode
1995-1998	Anne Le Guen	Louise Le Guen	Stéphane Kurc	4 episodes
1995	L'histoire du samedi	Lil	Christiane Spiero	1 episode
2000	Duelles	Adriane Roux	Laurence Katrian	1 episode
2000	Avocats & associés	Martine Mérieux / Lawyer Castor	Denis Amar & Philippe Triboit	2 episodes
2001	Fabien Cosma	Valérie	Franck Apprederis	1 episode
2005	Kaamelott	Morgan le Fay	Alexandre Astier and François Guérin	2 episodes
2009	Suite noire	Nora	Claire Devers	1 episode
2015-2017	The Bureau	Dr Laurène Balmes	Mathieu Demy, Laïla Marrakchi, ...	19 episodes
2016	Blaise	Carole	Jean-Paul Guigue & Camillelvis Théry	Short, 30 episodes
2019-2022	War of the Worlds	Catherine Durand	Richard Clark & Gilles Coulier	24 episodes
2023	Sous contrôle (En. Under Control)	Marie Teissier	-	Miniseries

=== Director / Writer ===
Year	Title	Notes
2013	Jeudi 15 h	Short

== Awards and nominations ==
Award	Year	Category	Work	Result	Ref.
César Awards	2019	Best Actress	Custody	Won	
César Awards	2024	Best Actress	Last Summer	Nominated	
César Awards	2026	Best Actress	Case 137	Won	
El Gouna Film Festival	2025	Best Actress	Adam's Interest	Won	
Ensor Awards	2023	Best Performance in a Supporting Role	Close	Nominated	
European Film Awards	2026	European Actress	Case 137	Nominated	
Globe de Cristal Awards	2007	Best Actress	The Man of My Life	Won	
Globe de Cristal Awards	2019	Best Actress	Custody	Nominated	
Lumière Awards	2019	Best Actress	Custody	Nominated	
Lumière Awards	2024	Best Actress	Last Summer	Nominated	
Lumière Awards	2026	Best Actress	Case 137	Won	
Molière Awards	2001	Best Female Revelation	Danny et la grande bleue	Nominated	
Molière Awards	2004	Best Female Revelation	84 Charing Cross Road	Nominated	
Molière Awards	2016	Best Actress	Un amour qui ne finit pas	Nominated	
Molière Awards	2020	Best Actress	La Dame de chez Maxim	Nominated	

== Theatre ==
Year	Title	Author	Director
1994	The Misanthrope	Molière	Roger Hanin
1994	Lysistrata	Aristophanes	Samuel Serreau-Labib
1995	The Trickster of Seville and the Stone Guest	Tirso de Molina	Jean-Louis Jacopin
1995	Le Mot	Victor Hugo	Xavier Marcheschi
1995	Le Projet	Gilles Dyrek, Frédéric Hulné, ...	Gilles Dyrek
1996	Les Vilains	Ruzzante	Marjorie Nakache
1996	Plaidoyer pour un boxeur	Marcia Romano	Serge Brincat
2000	Extrême Nudité	Christiane Liou	Hans Peter Cloos
2000-2001	Danny and the Deep Blue Sea	John Patrick Shanley	John R. Pepper
2002-03	Mangeront-ils	Victor Hugo	Benno Besson
2003	84 Charing Cross Road	Helene Hanff	Serge Hazanavicius
2004	Three Days of Rain	Richard Greenberg	Jean-Marie Besset & Gilbert Desveaux
2006	Blanc	Emmanuelle Marie	Zabou Breitman
2006-2007	La folle et véritable vie de Luigi Prizzoti	Édouard Baer	Édouard Baer
2007	Le Système Ribadier	Georges Feydeau	Christian Bujeau
2008-10	Blackbird	David Harrower	Claudia Stavisky
2009	Miam Miam	Édouard Baer	Édouard Baer
2010	The Lover	Harold Pinter	Didier Long
2011	Mer	Tino Caspanello	Jean-Louis Benoît
2011	Jeux de scène	Victor Haïm	Zabou Breitman
2012	Lúcido	Rafael Spregelburd	Marcial Di Fonzo Bo
2012-13	Demain il fera jour	Henry de Montherlant	Michel Fau
2012-13	À la française	Édouard Baer	Édouard Baer
2015-16	Un amour qui ne finit pas	André Roussin	Michel Fau
2016	La Porte à côté	Fabrice Roger-Lacan	Bernard Murat
2017	Cuisine et dépendances & Un air de famille	Jean-Pierre Bacri & Agnès Jaoui	Agnès Jaoui
2017	La Vraie vie	Fabrice Roger-Lacan	Bernard Murat
