= The Sisters Brothers (film) =

2018 film by Jacques Audiard

- Theatrical release poster
- Directed by: Jacques Audiard
- Screenplay by: Jacques Audiard; Thomas Bidegain
- Based on: The Sisters Brothers by Patrick deWitt
- Produced by: Pascal Caucheteux; Gregoire Sorlat; Michel Merkt; Michael De Luca; Allison Dickey; John C. Reilly
- Starring: John C. Reilly; Joaquin Phoenix; Jake Gyllenhaal; Riz Ahmed; Rutger Hauer
- Cinematography: Benoît Debie
- Edited by: Juliette Welfling
- Music by: Alexandre Desplat
- Production companies: Why Not Productions; Annapurna Pictures; Page 114; Michael De Luca Productions; Apache Films
- Distributed by: Annapurna Pictures (United States); UGC Distribution (France); Avalon Distribution (Spain)
- Release dates: 2 September 2018 (Venice); 21 September 2018 (United States)
- Running time: 121 minutes
- Countries: France; United States; Spain
- Language: English
- Budget: $38 million
- Box office: $14.6 million

The Sisters Brothers is a 2018 Western film directed by Jacques Audiard from a screenplay he co-wrote with Thomas Bidegain, based on the novel of the same name by Patrick deWitt. An American and French co-production, it is Audiard's first English-language work. The film stars John C. Reilly (who also produced) and Joaquin Phoenix as the notorious assassin brothers Eli and Charlie Sisters, and follows the two brothers as they chase after two men (Jake Gyllenhaal and Riz Ahmed) who have banded together to search for gold.

The film had its world premiere at the Venice International Film Festival on 2 September 2018, where it won the Silver Lion for Best Direction, and was theatrically released in the United States on 21 September 2018. The Sisters Brothers received positive reviews from critics, with most praise going to its performances, characters, direction and soundtrack. It was a box office bomb, grossing $14.1 million against its $38 million production budget. It was the final feature film featuring Rutger Hauer released before his death, although he had finished filming several projects released after his death.

== Plot ==
In the American West in 1851, gunfighters Eli and Charlie Sisters are hired by the wealthy "Commodore" to kill a man named Hermann Warm.

John Morris, a private detective, has been hired by the Commodore to track Warm down, and hand him over to the Sisters brothers. Morris finds Warm traveling by wagon train to California with the Gold Rush and befriends him. They travel to Jacksonville where Morris has arranged his rendezvous with the Sisters brothers. Warm finds Morris' handcuffs, realizes his true intentions, and threatens him at gunpoint but Morris overpowers him. Warm reveals that he plans to find gold using a chemical formula of his own invention; the Sisters brothers have been sent to retrieve the formula, most likely by torturing Warm before killing him. Refusing to allow an innocent man's murder, Morris frees Warm and the two leave Jacksonville. On the road toward San Francisco, Warm reveals that his ultimate plan is to create a utopian society in Dallas, Texas.

The brothers' pursuit is plagued by misfortune. A grizzly bear attacks their camp and mauls Eli's horse, Eli becomes very ill from swallowing a spider in his sleep and Charlie is repeatedly drunk and too hung over to ride. When they discover Morris' betrayal in Jacksonville, they follow the pair to the town of Mayfield. At Ms. Mayfield's hotel and brothel, she denies having seen Warm and Morris but offers the brothers a warm welcome. A sympathetic prostitute warns Eli of an impending attack and he attempts to leave with a drunken Charlie but they are cornered by Mayfield's gunslingers. The brothers kill the gunslingers and interrogate Mayfield as to Warm's and Morris’ whereabouts, before murdering and robbing her.

In San Francisco, Charlie and Eli argue about continuing their hunt. Eli wishes to retire and open a store, but Charlie angrily rejects this idea. The next day, Charlie reveals that he has found a claim staked in Morris' name a few days' ride away. Eli agrees to complete the hunt as their final job.

On the way to the claim site, the brothers are ambushed and captured by Warm and Morris, who are then attacked by Mayfield's men sent before her death to claim the formula for herself. The four team up to kill Mayfield's men, after which Charlie and Eli agree to help Warm and Morris find gold in exchange for half the takings. Morris is revealed to be a wealthy young man from Washington DC, who came west in rebellion against his father, now dead, and to whom Warm's Dallas phalanstère project has at last given a purpose in life. Working to dam the river, the new partners develop a camaraderie. Eli reveals to Warm that Charlie killed their abusive, alcoholic father when they were young, and that Charlie's short temper and violent tendencies put him in danger, so Eli reluctantly took up their present employment to protect him.

The dam is completed and Warm explains that when his chemical formula is added to water, it causes gold ore to glow briefly, but is extremely caustic. The men pour the formula into the river and begin gathering the gold. When the glow begins to fade, Charlie panics and tries to add more formula, but spills the undiluted substance onto his hand and into the river. Morris, rushing to restrain Charlie, stumbles and is submerged in the contaminated water while Warm, ignoring Eli's warnings, jumps in to rescue him. The next day, Warm, blinded and badly burned, dies from his injuries while Morris shoots himself to end his suffering.

Eli takes Charlie to the nearest town, where a doctor amputates his arm. Hired guns sent by the Commodore arrive and demand their surrender. Eli shoots them and the brothers spend many days fighting against various hired guns until he and Charlie decide they must kill the Commodore. They arrive in Oregon City to find that he has already died. The brothers are the only mourners at the Commodore's open casket; Eli punches the corpse several times "just to make sure". The brothers return home to their mother; though initially suspicious, she welcomes them in.

== Cast ==
- John C. Reilly as Eli Sisters
  - Aldo Maland as young Eli
- Joaquin Phoenix as Charlie Sisters
  - Theo Exarchopoulos as young Charlie
- Jake Gyllenhaal as John Morris
- Riz Ahmed as Hermann Kermit Warm
- Rebecca Root as Mayfield
- Allison Tolman as Saloon Prostitute
- Rutger Hauer as The Commodore
- Carol Kane as Mrs. Sisters, The Brothers' Mother
- Ian Reddington as Mr. Sisters, The Brothers' Father
- Richard Brake as Rex
- Creed Bratton as Quarrel Saloon Patron #2

== Production ==
In 2011, it was announced that the film rights to the novel The Sisters Brothers had been sold to John C. Reilly's production company, and Reilly was set to play one of the brothers. Four years later, French director Jacques Audiard announced on the radio station RTL that he would direct the film, his first English-language feature. On 25 April 2016, Deadline Hollywood reported that Joaquin Phoenix had joined the project. In February 2017, Variety reported that Jake Gyllenhaal had also been cast, later announcing that Riz Ahmed joined as well. In May, Variety stated that Annapurna Pictures would also produce and co-finance the film, alongside Why Not Productions, with Megan Ellison serving as an executive producer on the project.

The film started shooting in early June 2017 in the Spanish city Almería, and continued the shoot throughout the summer in Tabernas, Navarre and Aragon.

== Release ==
The Sisters Brothers had its world premiere at the Venice Film Festival on 2 September 2018. It was also screened at the Toronto International Film Festival on 7 September, and was theatrically released on 21 September 2018. Annapurna paid between $7.5–9 million for the North American distribution rights.

== Reception ==
=== Box office ===
As of May 9, 2019, The Sisters Brothers has grossed $3.1 million in the United States and Canada, and $11.5 million in other territories, for a total worldwide gross of $14.6 million, against a production budget of $38 million.

During its limited opening weekend, on 21 September, the film grossed $115,575 from four theaters, an average of $28,894 per venue. It expanded to 27 theaters in its second weekend, making $233,258, and to 54 theaters in its third, grossing $203,525. By its seventh weekend of release, the film had crossed $3 million domestically, after grossing $66,665 in 146 theaters that weekend. Its widest release was at 1,141 theaters.

=== Critical response ===
On review aggregation website Rotten Tomatoes, the film holds an approval rating of 87%, based on 208 reviews, with an average rating of 7.3/10. The site's critical consensus reads, "The Sisters Brothers rides familiar genre trails in occasionally unexpected ways - a satisfying journey further elevated by its well-matched leading men." On Metacritic, the film has a weighted average score of 78 out of 100, based on reviews from 44 critics, indicating "generally favorable reviews".

Peter Bradshaw of The Guardian gave the film 4 out of 5 stars, calling it "resoundingly enjoyable and funny". William Bibbiani of IGN assigned it an 8.0 out of 10, saying, "John C. Reilly and Joaquin Phoenix shine as wild west hitmen who are just smart enough to know they should be smarter, [and] whose quest leads them in unexpected, funny, and surprisingly emotional directions." Owen Gleibermen of Variety wrote, "The Sisters Brothers is too light to be a true drama and too heavy to be a comedy."

The film earned a warm response, including a standing ovation, at the 75th Venice International Film Festival. Jacques Audiard won the Silver Lion for Best Director at the festival.

=== Accolades ===
Award	Date of ceremony	Category	Recipient(s)	Result	Ref(s)
COFCA Awards	3 January 2019	Actor of the Year	Joaquin Phoenix (also for Don't Worry, He Won't Get Far on Foot and You Were Never Really Here)	Nominated	
César Awards	22 February 2019	Best Film	Pascal Caucheteaux, Grégoire Sorlat, Michel Merkt and Jacques Audiard	Nominated	
César Awards	22 February 2019	Best Director	Jacques Audiard	Won	
César Awards	22 February 2019	Best Adaptation	Jacques Audiard and Thomas Bidegain	Nominated	
César Awards	22 February 2019	Best Cinematography	Benoît Debie	Won	
César Awards	22 February 2019	Best Editing	Juliette Welfling	Nominated	
César Awards	22 February 2019	Best Sound	Cyril Holtz	Won	
César Awards	22 February 2019	Best Original Music	Alexandre Desplat	Nominated	
César Awards	22 February 2019	Best Costume Design	Milena Canonero	Nominated	
César Awards	22 February 2019	Best Production Design	Michel Barthélémy	Won	
Hollywood Music in Media Awards	14 November 2018	Original Score — Feature Film	Alexandre Desplat	Nominated	
International Film Music Critics Award	21 February 2018	Best Original Score for a Comedy Film	Alexandre Desplat	Nominated	
Lumière Awards	4 February 2019	Best Film	Jacques Audiard	Won	
Lumière Awards	4 February 2019	Best Director	Jacques Audiard	Won	
Lumière Awards	4 February 2019	Best Cinematography	Benoît Debie	Won	
Lumière Awards	4 February 2019	Best Music	Alexandre Desplat	Nominated	
Magritte Award	1 February 2020	Best Foreign Film in Coproduction	The Sisters Brothers	Nominated	
Magritte Award	1 February 2020	Best Cinematography	Benoît Debie	Nominated	
National Society of Film Critics Awards	5 January 2019	Best Actor	John C. Reilly (also for Stan & Ollie)	Nominated	
Louis Delluc Prize	25 October 2018	Best Film	Jacques Audiard	Nominated	
San Diego Film Critics Society Awards	10 December 2018	Best Actor	John C. Reilly	Nominated	
San Diego Film Critics Society Awards	10 December 2018	Best Body of Work	John C. Reilly (also for Ralph Breaks the Internet and Stan & Ollie)	Won	
Satellite Awards	22 February 2019	Best Original Score	Alexandre Desplat	Nominated	
Toronto International Film Festival	16 September 2018	People's Choice Award: Special Presentations	Jacques Audiard	Nominated	
Venice Film Festival	September 2018	Golden Lion	Jacques Audiard	Nominated	
Venice Film Festival	September 2018	Silver Lion for Best Direction	Jacques Audiard	Won	
