= La Vengeance au Triple Galop =

2021 French TV film

- Film poster
- Genre: Comedy
- Screenplay by: Alex Lutz; Arthur Sanigou; Lison Daniel; Thomas Poitevin; Audrey Lamy
- Directed by: Alex Lutz; Arthur Sanigou
- Starring: Audrey Lamy; Alex Lutz; Guillaume Gallienne; Leïla Bekhti; Gaspard Ulliel; Marion Cotillard; Izïa Higelin; François Civil
- Music by: Vincent Blanchard
- Country of origin: France
- Original language: French

Production
- Producers: Emmanuel Georges; Brigitte Ducottet; Jean-Marc Dumontet
- Cinematography: Michel Vannier
- Running time: 95 minutes
- Production companies: Supermouche; JMD

Original release
- Network: Canal+
- Release: 4 October 2021

La Vengeance au triple galop is a 2021 French comedy TV film directed by Alex Lutz and Arthur Sanigou, starring Audrey Lamy, Alex Lutz, Guillaume Gallienne, Leïla Bekhti, Gaspard Ulliel, Marion Cotillard, Izïa Higelin, and François Civil. The film is a parody of the 1983 Australian TV series Return to Eden. It was originally broadcast by French TV channel Canal+ on 4 October 2021. It was the last film starring Gaspard Ulliel to be released during his lifetime.

== Plot ==
After the death of her father, Stephanie Harper, a wealthy heiress, finds herself at the head of an empire she never dreamed of. A few years later, she married with great fanfare Craig Danners, three weeks after their "love at first sight". This man is a star thanks to the sport of which he is a reference in the whole world. However, he is not the dream husband... Craig has an affair with Crystal, Stephanie's best friend. The couple of lovers has a Machiavellian plan to get rid of Stephanie and steal her fortune.

== Cast ==
- Audrey Lamy as Stephanie Harper / Dolly Praners
- Alex Lutz as Craig Danners
- Guillaume Gallienne as Claude Marquinnier
- Leïla Bekhti as Crystal Clear
- Gaspard Ulliel as Danley Marchal-Widkins
- Marion Cotillard as Kim Randall
- Izïa Higelin as Debby Harper
- François Civil as Rodney Stingwing
- Karin Viard as Miranda Bloomberg
- Bruno Sanches as Abigail Santa Cruz
- Ingrid Chauvin as La Juge

== Production ==
A co-production between Supermouche and JMD, the film is a parody of the 1983 Australian TV series Return to Eden, whose French title is "La Vengeance aux Deux Visages" ("Two Faces of Revenge"). Director Alex Lutz said he used to watch soap-operas with his grandmother when he was a child, and that he wanted to pay a tribute to those soap-operas and also to his childhood memories.

A trailer was released on 24 September 2021.

== Filming ==
It was filmed in three weeks between April and May 2021. Filming took place in Ermenonville, on the property of horse trainer Mario Luraschi, with whom director Alex Lutz often rides.

== Release ==
The film made its world premiere at the Rochelle Fiction Film Festival in France on 17 September 2021. It was broadcast by French TV channel Canal+ on 4 October 2021. From 20 December to 23 December 2021, the film was broadcast as a four-part miniseries on Canal+. It was also made available for streaming on Canal+'s streaming platform, myCANAL.

== Awards ==
Year	Award	Category	Result
2021	La Rochelle TV Fiction Festival	Best Comedy	Won
