= The Trouble with You =

2018 film by Pierre Salvadori

- Theatrical release poster
- French: En liberté !
- Directed by: Pierre Salvadori
- Screenplay by: Pierre Salvadori; Benoît Graffin; Benjamin Charbit
- Dialogue by: Pierre Salvadori
- Produced by: Philippe Martin; David Thion
- Starring: Adèle Haenel; Pio Marmaï; Damien Bonnard; Vincent Elbaz; Audrey Tautou; Octave Bossuet; Hocine Choutri; Jean-Louis Barcelona
- Cinematography: Julien Poupard
- Edited by: Isabelle Devinck; Julie Lena; Géraldine Mangenot
- Music by: Camille Bazbaz
- Production companies: Les Films Pelléas; France 2 Cinéma; MK2 Films; CN6 Productions; Les Films Chaocorp; Tovo Films
- Distributed by: Memento Films Distribution
- Release dates: 14 May 2018 (Cannes); 31 October 2018 (France)
- Running time: 108 minutes
- Country: France
- Language: French
- Budget: €8 million ($9.2 million)
- Box office: $6.8 million

The Trouble with You (French: En liberté !, lit. 'Freely!') is a 2018 French romantic crime comedy film co-written and directed by Pierre Salvadori. It stars Adèle Haenel, Pio Marmaï, Damien Bonnard, Vincent Elbaz and Audrey Tautou.

The film premiered in the Directors' Fortnight section of the Cannes Film Festival on 14 May 2018. It was released theatrically in France on 31 October 2018 by Memento Films Distribution.

== Plot ==
Yvonne tells her young son every night the adventures of his father Jean, a police officer who died two years before. She is a lieutenant herself, and she prefers being on the field to the desk job she has. During a routine interrogation, she learns that Jean was in fact a corrupt cop, and had got Antoine imprisoned, who had a clean history before, for a hold-up of a jewellery shop. Louis, a colleague who is in love with her, convinces Yvonne to not reveal anything and let Antoine finish his last weeks in jail.

Antoine gets released soon. Yvonne, who is regretful, follows him and observes that after years of imprisonment, he is now mentally disturbed. Antoine finds his wife Agnès, who has been waiting for him. He has strange and sometimes violent reactions - he commits petty theft and beats up several people who attack him at a pub. Yvonne lets him get away at each instance.

After a fight with his wife, he is wandering around on the road, when he decides to jump in the sea. Yvonne who has been following him, jumps to save him. They get back to the city in a stolen car. Yvonne is both stunned and attracted to him, comes home to her son, who is being babysat by Louis. She then flirts with him, to his great surprise.

The next day, Antoine is taken to the police station for having crashed the car. Yvonne, who does not want Antoine to know that she works with the police, sits on a bench with prostitutes, to make it look like she is one of them.

Antoine, thinking that Yvonne is a prostitute, invites her to dinner, but Louis takes Yvonne on a fake suspect chase. Disappointed, Antoine takes the restaurant personnel hostage and burns down the restaurant. Yvonne removes him from the scene and hides him in a disused underground sado-masochist club. Antoine escapes, leaves his wife and handcuffs Yvonne to a bedpost to go rob the jewellery shop that he was supposed to have robbed, thus making him truly guilty and giving a meaning to the imprisonment which destroyed his youth.

Yvonne escapes and meets Antoine in the jewellery shop. She helps him to take the jewels and convinces him to escape to join his wife, while Yvonne gets arrested.

Much later, Yvonne is released from prison and finds Louis, who has taken care of her son during this time.

== Cast ==
- Adèle Haenel as Yvonne Santi
- Pio Marmaï as Antoine Parent
- Damien Bonnard as Louis
- Vincent Elbaz as Jean Santi
- Audrey Tautou as Agnès Parent
- Hocine Choutri as Mariton
- Octave Bossuet as Théo Santi
- Jean-Louis Barcelona as the psychopath
- Steve Tran as a client at the jewellery store

== Reception ==
=== Critical response ===
On the review aggregator website Rotten Tomatoes, the film holds an approval rating of 77% based on 13 reviews, with an average rating of 6.6/10. The French website AlloCiné gave the film an average rating of 4.3/5, based on 39 reviews.

=== Accolades ===
Award	Year	Category	Recipient(s)	Result	Ref(s)
Cannes Film Festival	2018	SACD Prize	Pierre Salvadori	Won	
Louis Delluc Prize	2018	Best Film	Pierre Salvadori	Nominated	
César Awards	2019	Best Film	Pierre Salvadori, Philippe Martin and David Thion	Nominated	
César Awards	2019	Best Director	Pierre Salvadori	Nominated	
César Awards	2019	Best Actor	Pio Marmaï	Nominated	
César Awards	2019	Best Actress	Adèle Haenel	Nominated	
César Awards	2019	Best Supporting Actor	Damien Bonnard	Nominated	
César Awards	2019	Best Supporting Actress	Audrey Tautou	Nominated	
César Awards	2019	Best Original Screenplay	Pierre Salvadori, Benoît Graffin and Benjamin Charbit	Nominated	
César Awards	2019	Best Editing	Isabelle Devinck	Nominated	
César Awards	2019	Best Original Music	Camille Bazbaz	Nominated	
Globe de Cristal Awards	2019	Best Comedy Film	Pierre Salvadori	Nominated	
Globe de Cristal Awards	2019	Best Comedy Actor	Pio Marmaï	Nominated	
Globe de Cristal Awards	2019	Best Comedy Actress	Adèle Haenel	Nominated	
Lumière Awards	2019	Best Director	Pierre Salvadori	Nominated	
Lumière Awards	2019	Best Screenplay	Pierre Salvadori, Benoît Graffin and Benjamin Charbit	Won	
Lumière Awards	2019	Best Music	Camille Bazbaz	Nominated	
Miami Film Festival	2019	Knight Marimbas Award	Pierre Salvadori	Nominated	
