= One Nation, One King =

- Film poster
- French: Un peuple et son roi
- Directed by: Pierre Schoeller
- Written by: Pierre Schoeller
- Produced by: Denis Freyd
- Starring: Gaspard Ulliel; Adèle Haenel; Laurent Lafitte; Louis Garrel
- Cinematography: Julien Hirsch
- Edited by: Laurence Briaud
- Music by: Philippe Schoeller
- Production companies: Archipel 35 / Archipel 33; France 3 Cinéma; StudioCanal; Les Films du Fleuve
- Distributed by: StudioCanal
- Release dates: 7 September 2018 (Venice Film Festival); 26 September 2018 (France)
- Running time: 121 minutes
- Countries: France; Belgium
- Language: French
- Budget: €16,9 million
- Box office: $2,4 million

One Nation, One King (French: Un peuple et son roi) is a 2018 French film written and directed by Pierre Schoeller. It stars Adèle Haenel, Gaspard Ulliel, Laurent Lafitte and Louis Garrel, and shows the French Revolution in Paris from the storming of the Bastille to the execution of the King. The film made its world premiere out of competition at the 75th Venice International Film Festival on 7 September 2018. It was released in France by StudioCanal on 26 September 2018.

== Plot ==
The film is a historical fresco dealing with the French Revolution, especially the first years of the period (1789–1793), and notably focusing on the role and the perception of the contemporaries of King Louis XVI in the tumult which engulfed France at the end of the Ancien Régime. The film looks at a number of historic figures of the time, such as Robespierre, Marat, Desmoulins and Danton, in the Estates General, the National Constituent Assembly, and finally the National Convention.

== Cast ==
- Gaspard Ulliel as Basile
- Louis Garrel as Maximilien de Robespierre
- Adèle Haenel as Françoise Candole
- Céline Sallette as Reine Audu
- Laurent Lafitte as Louis XVI
- Ruggero Barbera as le Dauphin Louis Charles
- Maëlia Gentil as Marie-Antoinette
- Denis Lavant as Jean-Paul Marat
- Niels Schneider as Louis Antoine de Saint-Just
- Izïa Higelin as Margot Laforce
- Olivier Gourmet as Louis-Joseph Henri, called the Uncle.
- Noémie Lvovsky as Solange, the Uncle's wife
- Andrzej Chyra as Claude François Lazowski
- Johan Libéreau as Tonin
- Audrey Bonnet as femme Landelle
- Thibaut Evrard as Stanislas-Marie Maillard
- Jean-Marc Roulot as sectionnaire Lechenard
- Grégory Gatignol as Clément l’Effaré
- Cosme Castro as a patriot during the Storming of the Bastille
- Vincent Deniard as Georges Jacques Danton
- Jean-Charles Clichet as Jérôme Pétion de Villeneuve
- Julia Artamonov as Pauline Léon
- Patrick Hauthier as François Henri, comte de Virieu
- Philippe Chaine as Jean-Denis Lanjuinais
- Rodolphe Congé as Emmanuel-Joseph Sieyès
- Jean-Pierre Duret as Gamon
- Guillaume Marquet as Jean-Joseph Mounier, president of the Assemblée
- Pierre-François Garel as Antoine Barnave
- John Arnold as Nicolas de Condorcet
- Jacques Ledran as Jacques Guillaume Thouret
- Etienne Beydon as Camille Desmoulins
- Grégoire Tachnakian as Antoine-François Momoro
- Thibault Lacroix as Charles Varlet
- Frédéric Norbert as César-Guillaume de La Luzerne, Bishop of Langres
- Serge Merlin as Louis XI in the nightmare of Louis XVI
- Patrick Préjean as Henry IV of France in the nightmare of Louis XVI
- Louis-Do de Lencquesaing as Louis XIV in the nightmare of Louis XVI
- Jacques Lacaze as Bertrand Barère

== Release and reception ==
The film premiered out of competition at the 75th Venice International Film Festival on 7 September 2018. It was the opening film of the 8th Festival de l'Ecrit à l'écran, and was screened at the 2018 23rd Busan International Film Festival.

=== Accolades ===
- Festival du film politique de Porto-Vecchio 2018 : Jury des médias
- 44th César Awards
  - Nominated – César Award for Best Costume Design for Anaïs Romand
  - Nominated – César Award for Best Production Design for Thierry François
