= Alex Lutz =

French actor, comedian and director (born 1978)

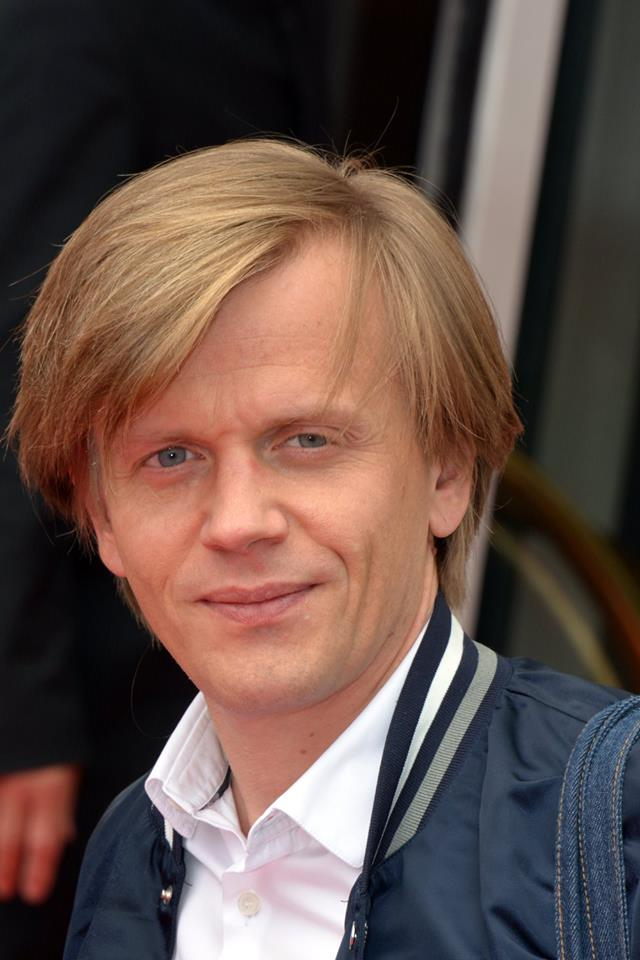
- Lutz in 2018
- Born: 25 August 1978 (age 48); Strasbourg, France
- Occupations: Actor, comedian, director
- Years active: 2003–present

Alex Lutz (born 25 August 1978) is a French actor, comedian and director. He is best known for his role of Catherine in La revue de presse de Catherine et Liliane in Le Petit Journal.

He won two Molière awards for comedy in 2016 and 2019. His breakthrough came the same year when he won the Lumière and César awards for Best Actor for his role in Guy, a faux musical documentary that marked his second stint as a director.

He has worked with comedians such as Malik Bentalha, Pierre Palmade, Michèle Laroque, Jean-Loup Dabadie, Sylvie Joly, Audrey Lamy in different plays and one man shows, as a comedian or director.

== Filmography ==
=== As filmmaker ===
Year	English Title	Original title	Notes
2015	Le talent de mes amis		
2018	Guy		Nominated - César Award for Best Film; Nominated - César Award for Best Director; Nominated - César Award for Best Original Screenplay; Nominated - Globe de Cristal Award - Best Comedy; Nominated - Lumière Award for Best Film
2021	La Vengeance au Triple Galop		TV Movie
2023	Strangers by Night	Une Nuit	
2025	Connemara		

=== As actor ===
Year	Title	Role	Director(s)	Notes
2008	Female Agents	Soldier	Jean-Paul Salomé	
2009	OSS 117: Lost in Rio	Heinrich	Michel Hazanavicius	
2010	Bacon on the Side	Benoît Dubreuil	Anne Depétrini	
2011	Hollywoo	Jean-Philippe	Frédéric Berthe; Pascal Serieis	
2011	My Piece of the Pie	Important Man	Cédric Klapisch	
2011	La Croisière	Brian	Pascale Pouzadoux	
2011	Xanadu	Young Alex Valadine	Jean-Philippe Amar	TV series (1 episode)
2011–2012	Soda	Thierry	Nath Dumont; Jean-Michel Ben Soussan	TV series (1 episode)
2012	Porn in the Hood	The Egyptian	Franck Gastambide	
2012	Bowling	The Examiner	Marie-Castille Mention-Schaar	
2012	Scènes de ménages	Stutterer Neighbour	Karim Adda; Francis Duquet	TV series (1 episode)
2012–2019	Catherine et Liliane	Catherine Jablasy	Arthur Sanigou	TV series
2013	Paris à tout prix	Ben	Reem Kherici	
2013	Turf	Baron de Sonneville	Fabien Onteniente	
2013	Une femme dans la Révolution	Maximilien Robespierre	Jean-Daniel Verhaeghe	TV miniseries
2014	French Women	Jacques	Audrey Dana	
2015	Le talent de mes amis	Alexandre Ludon	Alex Lutz	
2016	Odd Job	Brecht	Pascal Chaumeil	
2016	The Visitors: Bastille Day	Robert de Montmirail	Jean-Marie Poiré	
2016	Paris-Willouby	Marc Lacourt	Arthur Delaire; Quentin Reynaud	
2017	Knock	Lupus	Lorraine Lévy	
2017	Jamais contente	Sébastien Couette	Émilie Deleuze	
2018	Guy	Guy Jamet	Alex Lutz	César Award for Best Actor; Lumière Award for Best Actor; Nominated - Globe de Cristal Award - Best Actor - Comedy
2018	Asterix: The Secret of the Magic Potion	Teleferix	Louis Clichy; Alexandre Astier	
2018	Les aventures de Spirou et Fantasio	Fantasio	Alexandre Coffre	
2019	Convoi exceptionnel		Bertrand Blier	
2020	Final Set	Thomas Edison	Quentin Reynaud	
2021	La Vengeance au Triple Galop	Craig Danners	Alex Lutz & Arthur Sanigou	TV film
2021	A Bookshop in Paris	Gérard	Sergio Castellitto	
2022	Vortex	Stéphane	Gaspar Noé	
2022	The Blaze	Simon	Quentin Reynaud	
2022	Une comedie romantique	Cesar	Thibault Segouin	
2024	Becoming Karl Lagerfeld	Pierre Bergé	Jérôme Salle; Audrey Estrougo	TV series
2024	Dear Paris	Xavier	Marjane Satrapi	
