= Shéhérazade (2018 film) =

French movie released in 2018

- Directed by: Jean-Bernard Marlin
- Written by: Jean-Bernard Marlin; Catherine Paillé
- Starring: Dylan Robert; Kenza Fortas; Idir Azougli
- Distributed by: Netflix
- Release dates: 11 May 2018 (Cannes Film Festival); 5 September 2018
- Country: France
- Language: French
- Box office: $966,225

Shéhérazade is a 2018 French drama film directed by Jean-Bernard Marlin and written by Jean-Bernard Marlin and Catherine Paillé.

== Cast ==
- Dylan Robert as Zachary
- Kenza Fortas as Shéhérazade
- Idir Azougli as Ryad
- Lisa Amedjout as Sabrina
- Kader Benchoudar as Medhi Mouton
- Nabila Ait Amer as Sara
- Nabila Bounad as Souraya
- Sofia Bent as Zelda (as Sofian Bentoumi)
- Osman Hrustic as Cheyenne
- Abdellah Khoulalene as Jordi
- Abdelkader Benkaddar as Jugurtha
- Agnès Cauchon Riondet as La juge (as Agnès Cauchon)
- Sabine Gavaudan as La juge d'instruction
- Assia Laouid as Assia

== See also ==
- Shéhérazade (1963 film)
