= Kenza Fortas =

French actress (born 2001)

Kenza Fortas (born 26 January 2001 in Bagnols-sur-Cèze) is a French actress. In her first film in 2018 she played the title role in Shéhérazade. She also appeared in BAC Nord directed by Cédric Jimenez.
