= Emmanuel Finkiel =

French film director and actor

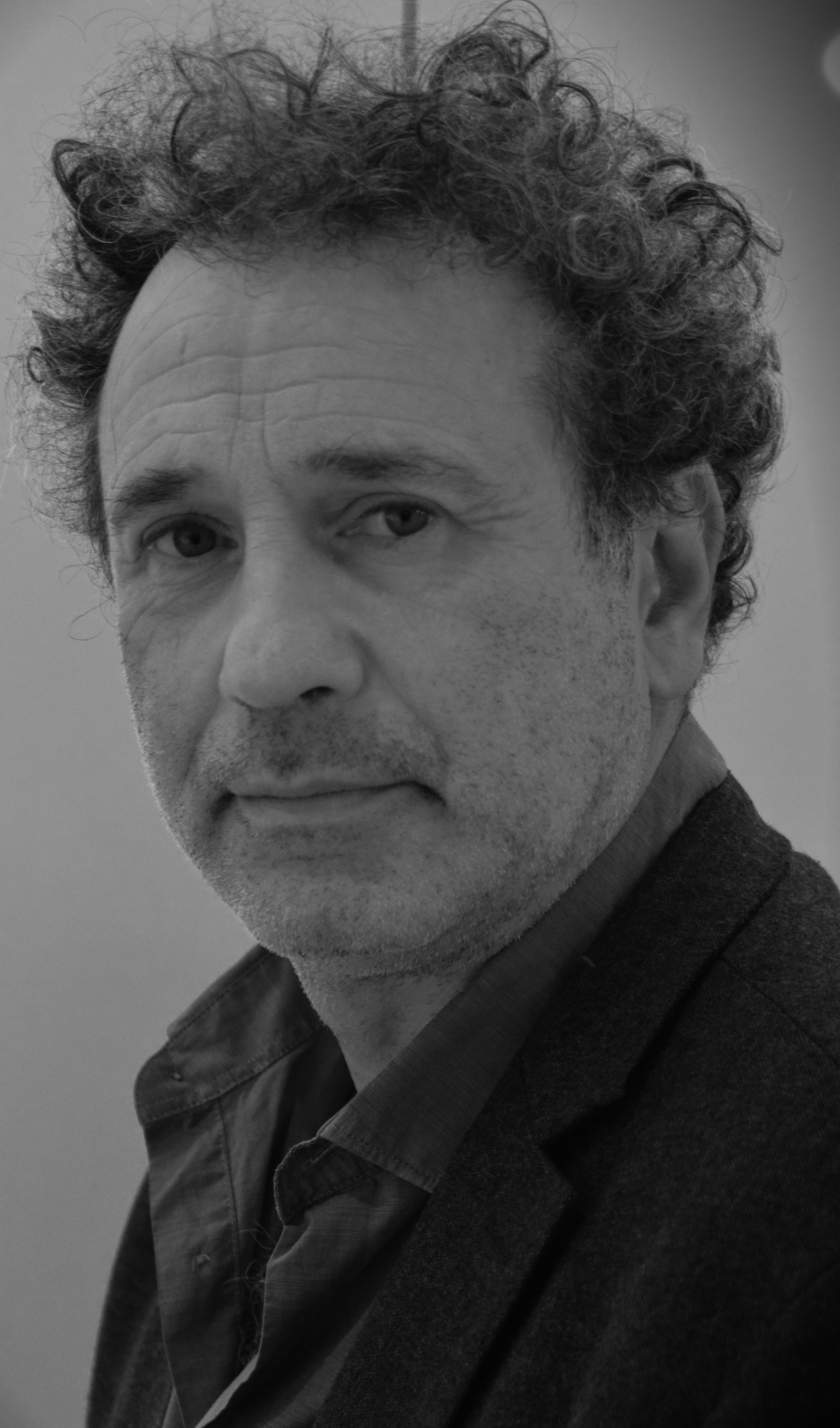
- Emmanuel Finkiel in 2018
- Born: 30 October 1961 (age 64); Boulogne-Billancourt
- Occupations: Film director, actor

Emmanuel Finkiel (born 30 October 1961 in Boulogne-Billancourt) is a French film director and actor.

Emmanuel Finkiel was born to a father who was born in France, whose parents and brother were rounded up in 1942 during the Vel d'Hiv roundup and then deported and killed in Auschwitz. His family came from Poland and one of his great-grandfathers was a rabbi.

He began his career in 1979 as an assistant director to Jean-Luc Godard, Krzysztof Kieslowski and Bertrand Tavernier. He initially worked as an assistant director for 16 years. His debut film, Voyages received Louis Delluc Prize and César Award for Best First Feature Film. Finkiel also received Prix Jean Vigo for his film Nulle part, terre promise. In 2019, he was nominated for César Award for Best Director and César Award for Best Adaptation for his film, Memoir of War.

== Filmography ==
=== Director ===
==== Cinema ====
- 1999: Voyages
- 2000: Samedi
- 2000: Dimanche
- 2000: Lundi
- 2006: Les Européens
- 2009: Nulle part, terre promise
- 2012: Je suis
- 2016: A Decent Man
- 2017: Memoir of War

==== Television ====
- 1997: Regards d'enfance
- 2006: En marge des jours
- 2022: In Therapy (season 2, Claire episodes)

=== Actor ===
- 2003: Motus
- 2004: Le Pont des Arts
- 2004: The Beat That My Heart Skipped
