= Custody (2017 film) =

2017 film by Xavier Legrand

- Theatrical release poster
- French: Jusqu'à la garde
- Directed by: Xavier Legrand
- Written by: Xavier Legrand
- Produced by: Alexandre Gavras
- Starring: Denis Ménochet; Léa Drucker; Thomas Gioria; Mathilde Auneveux; Mathieu Saïkaly; Florence Janas; Saadia Bentaïeb; Sophie Pincemaille; Émilie Incerti Formentini; Jérôme Care-Aulanier; Jenny Bellay; Jean-Marie Winling; Martine Vandeville; Martine Schambacher; Jean-Claude Leguay; Julien Lucas; Coralie Russier
- Cinematography: Nathalie Durand
- Edited by: Yorgos Lamprinos
- Production companies: KG Productions; France 3 Cinéma
- Distributed by: Haut et Court
- Release dates: 8 September 2017 (Venice); 7 February 2018 (France)
- Running time: 93 minutes
- Country: France
- Language: French
- Budget: €3.1 million ($3.5 million)
- Box office: $3.8 million

Custody (French: Jusqu'à la garde, lit. 'Up to the Hilt') is a 2017 French drama film written and directed by Xavier Legrand and starring Denis Ménochet, Léa Drucker and Thomas Gioria. It was screened in the main competition section of the 74th Venice International Film Festival where it won the Silver Lion. At the 44th César Awards, Custody won the awards for Best Film, Best Actress (Drucker), and Best Original Screenplay.

== Plot ==
Miriam Besson and Antoine Besson are a recently divorced couple. They have a daughter close to the age of eighteen, Joséphine, and an eleven-year-old son, Julien. Miriam wants to protect her son and keep him away from his father, whom she accuses of being violent. Therefore, during the custody court hearing, she asks for sole custody of the child, providing a letter from Julien saying that he does not want to see his father.

Despite Miriam's pleas, the judge grants shared custody and orders the child to spend alternate weekends with his father. Julien is frightened of his father and wants to protect his mother from the physical and psychological violence inflicted by Antoine.

Antoine wants to continue to exercise his power over Miriam and Julien with pressure and threats to the child. This attitude, and his aggressive outbursts, creates tension with his own parents who tell Antoine to leave their home, where he had been staying. Antoine then intimidates Julien into showing him where the family has moved to.

Antoine turns up outside the venue of Joséphine's 18th birthday party. During an argument he grabs his ex-wife by her throat, until her sister Sylvia intervenes, threatening to call the police if Antoine ever shows up again.

That night, while Miriam and Julien are sleeping at their home, Antoine tries to enter the apartment armed with a shotgun, which he fires into the door. A neighbour calls the police. Miriam and Julien barricade themselves in the bathroom, following advice from a police call centre, until police officers arrive and disarm and arrest Antoine.

== Cast ==
- Léa Drucker as Miriam Besson
- Denis Ménochet as Antoine Besson
- Thomas Gioria as Julien Besson
- Mathilde Auneveux as Joséphine Besson
- Mathieu Saïkaly as Samuel
- Florence Janas as Sylvia
- Saadia Bentaïeb as the judge
- Coralie Russier as the court clerk
- Sophie Pincemaille as Maître Davigny
- Émilie Incerti Formentini as Maître Ghenen
- Jérôme Care-Aulanier as the Police Rescue operator agent
- Jenny Bellay as the neighbour
- Martine Vandeville as Madeleine, Antoine's mother
- Jean-Marie Winling as Joël Besson, Antoine's father
- Martine Schambacher as Nanny, Miriam's mother
- Jean-Claude Leguay as André, Miriam's father
- Julien Lucas as Cyril

== Reception ==
On the review aggregator website Rotten Tomatoes, the film holds an approval rating of 96% based on 119 reviews, with an average rating of 7.9/10. The website's critical consensus reads, "Custody uses formal restraint—and a series of searing performances—to take a hard-hitting look at the often painful bond between parents and children." On Metacritic, the film has a weighted average score of 83 out of 100, based on 21 critics, indicating "universal acclaim", and is listed as a "Metacritic must-see".

For The Canadian Press, David Friend said, "Xavier Legrand captures unsettling performances from his entire cast, especially the young Thomas Gioria as the child caught in the midst of turmoil." Peter Rainer of The Christian Science Monitor noted "the ordeal of the children is not skimped. They bear the brunt, and the legacy, of the anguish."
