= Pierre Salvadori =

French film directorn 1964)(bor

- Salvadori in 2026
- Born: 8 November 1964 (age 61); Tunisia
- Occupations: Film director, screenwriter
- Years active: 1992–present

Pierre Salvadori (born 8 November 1964) is a French film director from Santo-Pietro-di-Venaco, known for works on romantic comedies such as Priceless (2006) and The Trouble with You (2018).

== Life and career ==
In 1989, Salvadori wrote his first screenplay, which would then become the hit film Wild Target(Cible émouvante), which he directed in 1993. The film garnered the young director a César nomination for Best First Work, though he had already tested his directorial capabilities the year before with the short film Ménage.

Cible émouvante was remade in London by Jonathan Lynn as Wild Target (2009).

In 1995, Salvadori began working with Marie Trintignant and Guillaume Depardieu, whom he cast in the highly successful films The Apprentices and Comme elle respire. And in 2000, Salvadori switched gears from comedy to the dark thriller The Sandmen.

He was awarded the ‘Itinérances’ prize in 2023 by the Alès Film Festival – Itinérances.

In 2026, Salvadori directed The Electric Kiss, a romantic tragicomedy set in the Paris art world of the Roaring Twenties, which opened the 79th Cannes Film Festival.

== Filmography ==
=== As filmmaker ===
Year	English Title	Original Title	Notes
1993	Wild Target	Cible émouvante	
1995	The Apprentices	Les Apprentis	
1998	White Lies	Comme elle respire	
2000	The Sandmen	Le détour	Feature version of TV Movie of same title
2003	After You...	Après vous	
2006	Priceless	Hors de prix	
2010	Beautiful Lies	De vrais mensonges	
2014	In the Courtyard	Dans la cour	
2018	The Trouble with You	En liberté!	
2022	The Little Gang	La Petite Bande	
2026	The Electric Kiss	La Vénus électrique	

=== Television ===
- L'@mour est à réinventer (1996) – TV series, 1 episode
- Le détour (2000) – TV film

=== Actor ===
- L'histoire du garçon qui voulait qu'on l'embrasse (1994)
- The Banned Woman (1997)
- La femme du cosmonaute (1998)
- White Lies (1998)
- Tu vas rire, mais je te quitte (2005)
