= Jeanne Herry =

French actress and film director

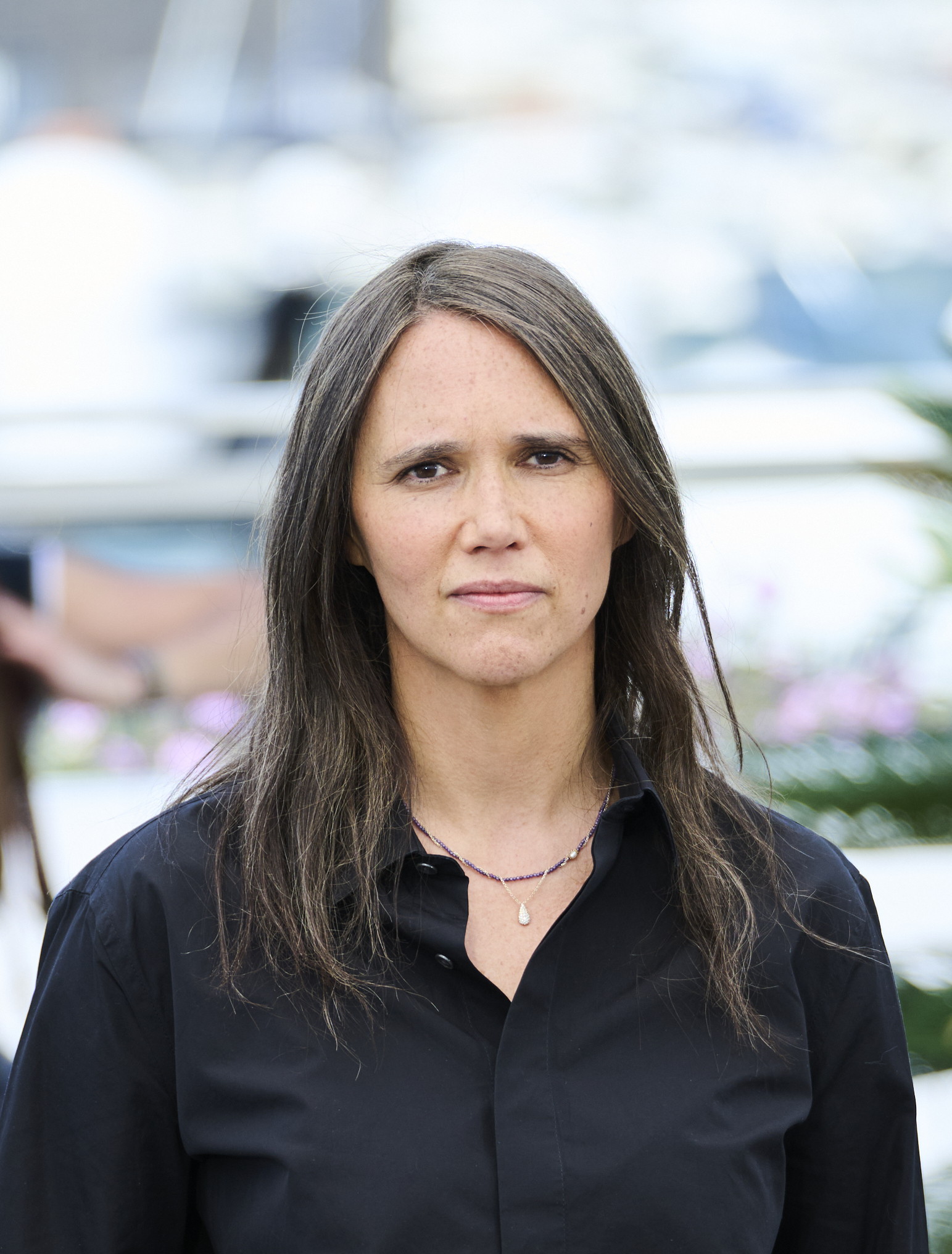
- Herry in 2026
- Born: 19 April 1978 (age 48); France
- Occupations: Film director, actress, screenwriter
- Years active: 1990–present
- Children: 2

Jeanne Herry (born 19 April 1978) is a French filmmaker and actress. She is most known for her drama films In Safe Hands (2018) and All Your Faces (2023), for which she received two nominated for the César Award for Best Director.

== Personal life ==
She is the daughter of actress Miou-Miou and singer-songwriter Julien Clerc.

== Filmography ==
=== Feature films ===
Year	English Title	Original Title	Notes
2014	Number One Fan	Elle l'adore	Deauville American Film Festival - Michel d'Ornano Award; Nominated—César Award for Best First Feature Film; Nominated—Lumière Award for Best First Film; Nominated—Lumière Award for Best Screenplay
2018	In Safe Hands	Pupille	Festival International du Film Francophone de Namur - Best Screenplay; Nominated—César Award for Best Film; Nominated—César Award for Best Director; Nominated—César Award for Best Original Screenplay; Nominated—Lumière Award for Best Film; Nominated—Lumière Award for Best Director; Nominated—Lumière Award for Best Screenplay; Nominated—Louis Delluc Prize for Best Film
2023	All Your Faces	Je verrai toujours vos visages	
2026	Another Day	Garance	

=== Short films ===
- Marcher (2009)

=== Television ===
Year	Title	Notes
2017	Call My Agent!	TV series (3 episodes), also actress
2019	Mouche	Remake of British TV series Fleabag for Canal+

=== Only actress ===
Year	Title	Notes
1990	May Fools	
1995	Une femme dans la tourmente	TV movie
2002	Maigret	TV series (1 episode)
2004	La nourrice	TV movie
2004	À cran, deux ans après	TV movie
2005	Gabrielle	
2005	Clara Sheller	TV series (1 episode)
2006	Jean-Philippe	
2006	En compagnie des choses	Short
2007	La route, la nuit	Short
