= In Safe Hands =

- Directed by: Jeanne Herry
- Written by: Jeanne Herry
- Produced by: Alain Attal; Hugo Sélignac; Vincent Mazel
- Starring: Sandrine Kiberlain; Gilles Lellouche; Élodie Bouchez
- Cinematography: Sofian El Fani
- Edited by: Stéphane Garnier; Françis Vesin
- Music by: Pascal Sangla
- Distributed by: StudioCanal
- Release dates: 26 August 2018 (Angoulême); 5 December 2018
- Running time: 107 minutes
- Countries: France; Belgium
- Language: French
- Budget: $7.8 million
- Box office: $6.7 million

In Safe Hands (French: Pupille) is a 2018 French drama film directed by Jeanne Herry starring her mother Miou-Miou.

== Cast ==
- Sandrine Kiberlain : Karine
- Gilles Lellouche : Jean
- Élodie Bouchez : Alice
- Olivia Côte : Lydie
- Clotilde Mollet : Mathilde
- Miou-Miou : Irène
- Stéfi Celma : Elodie
- Jean-François Stévenin : Alice's father
- Bruno Podalydès : Alice's ex
- Grégory Gadebois : PFS Head of Service
- Émilie Gavois-Kahn : The pediatric nurse

== Production ==
The film was shot in seven weeks, between October and November 2017. Filming took place primarily in the Finistère department. Scenes were shot in the neonatal unit at the Hôpital Morvan in Brest. Additional scenes were shot at the town hall of Brest. Filming also took place in the nearby commune of Locmaria-Plouzané.

Filming also took place in Belgium in order to capture scenes with infants only three days old and ten days old because in France, the law prohibits children under 3 months old from appearing in film.
