= Guy (2018 film) =

2018 French comedy film

- Film poster
- Directed by: Alex Lutz
- Written by: Anaïs Deban; Alex Lutz; Thibault Ségouin
- Produced by: Oury Milshtein
- Starring: Alex Lutz; Tom Dingler; Pascale Arbillot; Nicole Calfan; Dani; Élodie Bouchez
- Edited by: Alexandre Donot; Alexandre Westphal
- Music by: Vincent Blanchard; Romain Greffe
- Distributed by: StudioCanal
- Release dates: 16 May 2018 (Cannes Film Festival); 29 August 2018 (France)
- Running time: 101 minutes
- Country: France
- Language: French
- Budget: $3 million
- Box office: $1.3 million

Guy is a 2018 French comedy film directed, written and starring Alex Lutz.

This is a mockumentary of a 73-year-old French pop singer, "Guy Jamet" (Alex Lutz), whose heyday was three or more decades ago, touring to promote a new album of covers. Pretending to film a documentary about him is Gauthier (Tom Dingler), who suspects Guy may be his biological father based on a letter written by his recently deceased mother that he (Gauthier) discovered. Guy is a "compilation of a number of classic" French crooners, and the film is made up of interviews by Gauthier of Guy with references to French TV shows and personalities. These are interrupted by performances of Guy's soft, sentimental pop songs before enthusiastic audiences during his tour.

== Cast ==
- Alex Lutz as Guy Jamet
- Tom Dingler as Gauthier
- Pascale Arbillot as Sophie Ravel
- Nicole Calfan as Stéphanie Madhani
- Dani as Anne-Marie
  - Élodie Bouchez as Young Anne-Marie
- Marina Hands as Kris-Eva
- Bruno Sanches as Frédéric
- Anne Marivin as Marie-France
- Nicole Ferroni as Juliette Bose
- Sarah Suco as Sara
- Brigitte Roüan as Gauthier's mother
- Catherine Hosmalin as The friend
- Alessandra Sublet as Herself
- Julien Clerc as Himself
- Michel Drucker as Himself

== Reception ==
The Hollywood Reporter considered Guy to be "A sparkling, ironic salute to age and passing time".
