= Little Tickles =

2018 film

- Film poster
- Directed by: Andréa Bescond; Eric Métayer
- Written by: Andréa Bescond
- Starring: Andréa Bescond; Karin Viard; Clovis Cornillac; Pierre Deladonchamps
- Edited by: Valérie Deseine
- Release dates: 14 May 2018 (Cannes); 26 September 2018 (France)
- Running time: 103 minutes
- Country: France
- Language: French
- Budget: $3.6 million
- Box office: $2.8 million

Little Tickles (French: Les Chatouilles) is a 2018 French drama film directed by Andréa Bescond and Eric Métayer. It was screened in the Un Certain Regard section at the 2018 Cannes Film Festival.

== Cast ==
- Andréa Bescond : Odette Le Nadant
- Karin Viard : Mado Le Nadant
- Clovis Cornillac : Fabrice Le Nadant
- Pierre Deladonchamps : Gilbert Miguié
- Grégory Montel : Lenny
- Carole Franck : The psy
- Gringe : Manu
- Ariane Ascaride : Madame Malec
- Alexis Michalik : Sonia's father

Principal photography began from 29 May 2017 to 17 July 2017.
