= Xavier Legrand =

French actor, scriptwriter and filmmaker (born 1979)

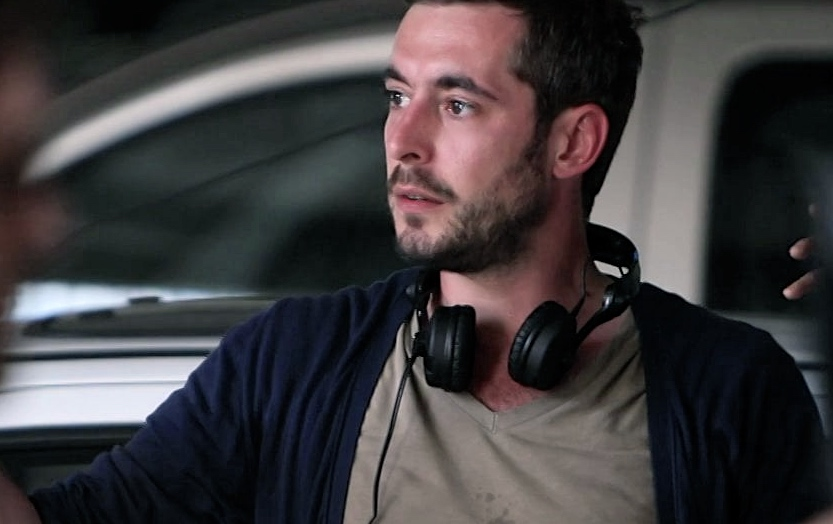
- Legrand on the set of Just Before Losing Everything
- Born: 28 March 1979 (age 46); Melun, France
- Occupation(s): Director, Actor, Screenwriter
- Years active: 2005–present

Xavier Legrand (born 28 March 1979) is a French actor, scriptwriter and filmmaker. Legrand was nominated for an Academy Award for Best Live Action Short Film for the 2013 film Avant que de tout perdre (Just Before Losing Everything). His first feature Custody was in competition at the 74th Venice Film Festival and earned Legrand the Silver Lion for Best Director as well as four César Awards.

His second feature film, The Successor (Le Successeur), premiered at the 71st San Sebastián International Film Festival in 2023. The movie received mixed reviews from critics.

== Selected filmography ==
- Just Before Losing Everything (2013, short film)
- Custody (2017)
- The Successor (Le Successeur) (2023)
