= Camille Bazbaz =

French author-composer-interpreter

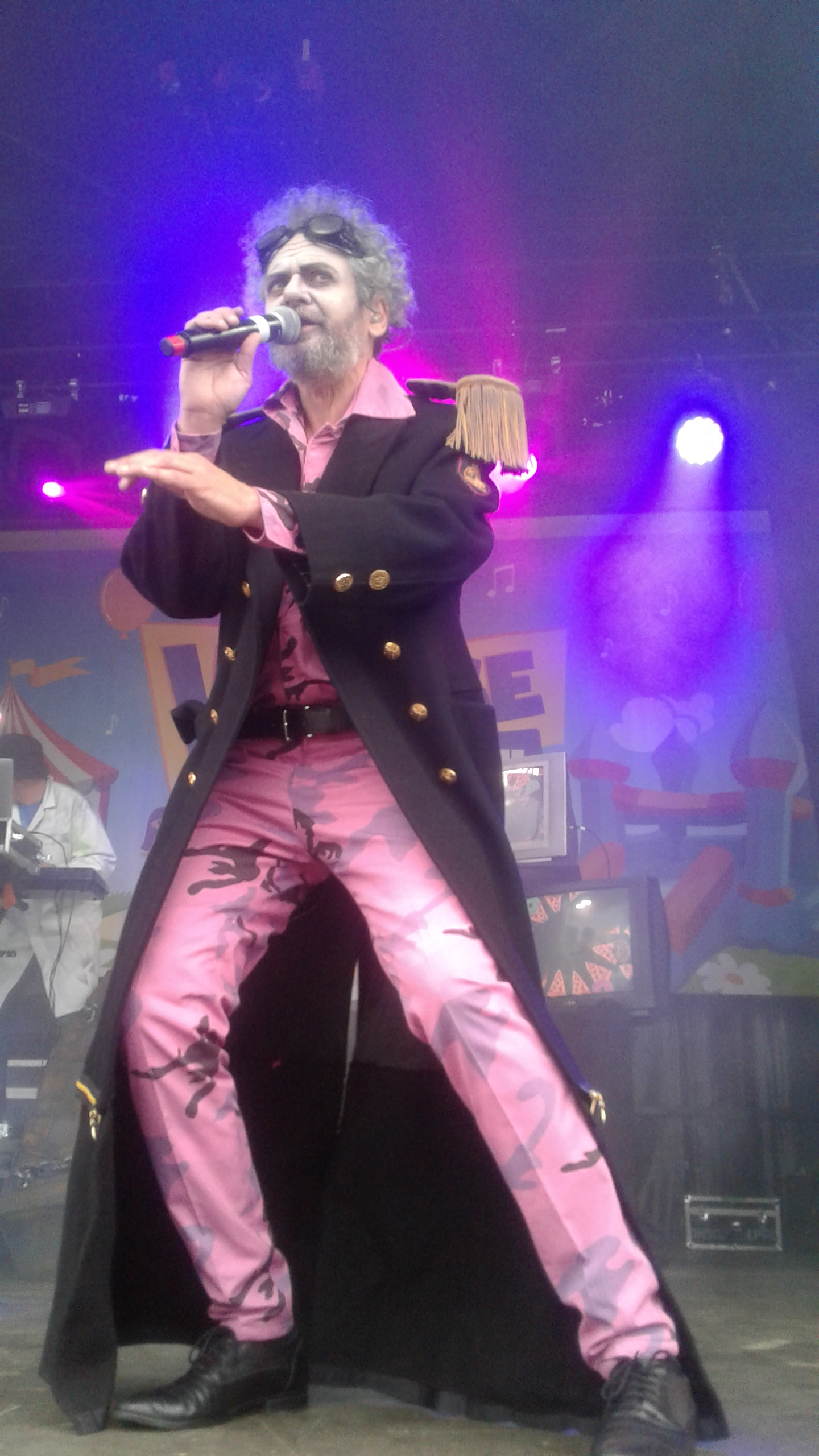

Background information
- Born: 1967 (age 58–59); Suresnes, France
- Occupations: Singer, author, composer
- Website: www.bazbaz.noziris.net

Camille Bazbaz (born 1967) is a French author-composer-interpreter with French-Lebanese roots. He was born in Suresnes.

== Biography ==
French pop-reggae-soul artist Camille Bazbaz's career began during his college years as a member of the politically charged, rebellious punk rock group Cri de la Mouche (Cry of the Fly). Bazbaz stayed with the group throughout the 1980s, serving as the group's organist. Influenced by the punk and rock sounds of the '70s, Cri de la Mouche stayed active until their split in 1990.

Bazbaz took the opportunity to explore new stylistic directions. These included reggae, soul, and the blues, but most importantly hip-hop. Bazbaz dove headfirst into the rap and hip-hop idioms in the early 1990s, collaborating with French hip-hop musicians like Joey Starr, who ultimately appeared on his debut record, Dubadelik, released in 1996. Colored with gentle reggae inflections and characterized by Bazbaz's typically humorous and seductive lyrics, the record was well received by the emerging French urban music community. Dubadelik earned Bazbaz a reputation as an underground up-and-comer, opening doors into other creative circles.

Filmmaker Pierre Savadori commissioned Bazbaz to compose the soundtracks for four of his films, Comme Elle Respire (1997), Les Marchands de Sable (2000), Apres Vous (2003), and Hors de Prix (2006). As he gained recognition as a film composer, Bazbaz's solo discography continued to grow with the releases of Une Envie de Chien (2000) and Sur le Bout de la Langue (2004).

A pilgrimage to Kingston, Jamaica, produced the artist's fourth solo record, Le bonheur fantôme. Recorded with a mixture of local musicians and Bazbaz's regular collaborators, the album became the artist's most West Indies-centric project to date. The album's release in May 2007 was followed by a busy touring schedule that would take Bazbaz and his bandmates to every corner of the French world music circuit.

== Discography ==
=== Albums ===
- Dubadelik (1996)
- Une envie de chien (2000)
- Sur le bout de la langue (2004)
- Le bonheur fantôme (2007)
- La chose (2010)
- A Bang (2011)
- Bazbaz café (2016)

=== Single ===
- Après vous... Original sound trac (2003)
- Illiennes (2007)
- Con d'Homme (2007)
