= Memoir of War =

2017 film

- Film poster
- Directed by: Emmanuel Finkiel
- Screenplay by: Emmanuel Finkiel
- Based on: La Douleur by Marguerite Duras
- Starring: Mélanie Thierry; Benoît Magimel
- Release date: 27 August 2017
- Running time: 126 minutes
- Country: France
- Language: French
- Budget: $7.6 million
- Box office: $2.8 million

Memoir of War, also known as Memoir of Pain (French: La douleur), is a 2017 French drama film directed by Emmanuel Finkiel that stars Mélanie Thierry and Benoît Magimel and is based on the 1985 autobiographical novel La Douleur by Marguerite Duras. It was selected as the French entry for the Best Foreign Language Film at the 91st Academy Awards, but it was not nominated.

== Plot ==
As Allied armies approach Paris in the summer of 1944, the occupying Germans arrest Robert, a writer and resister. His distraught wife Marguerite, also a writer and in the same resistance network, is approached by a French collaborator working for the Gestapo, who says he may be able to give information on her husband's fate. In return, he explicitly wants information on the influential resister Morland and implicitly would like an affair. After consulting Dionys, the head of the network who is also Marguerite's lover, she agrees to play along with the collaborator. They meet frequently, and he plies her with scarce food and wine, but she yields him no information or sex. He does however confirm that Robert has been deported to a concentration camp in Germany.

Once Paris is liberated and the Gestapo gone, the emphasis of the resisters switches to the fate of their captured members and support of their families. As Allied armies start liberating the concentration camps in the spring of 1945, information begins to trickle back on who is still alive and who is dead. Marguerite goes through agonies of waiting, torn between hope and despair, until it is confirmed that Robert is in Dachau and close to death. Dionys and Morland obtain a vehicle and papers to bring him back to Paris. When he is fit to work and travel, Marguerite takes him for a holiday in Italy but then divorces him.

== Cast ==
- Mélanie Thierry as Marguerite Duras
- Emmanuel Bourdieu as Robert Antelme
- Benoît Magimel as the fictional Pierre Rabier
- Benjamin Biolay as Dionys Mascolo
- Grégoire Leprince-Ringuet as Morland

== Reception ==
=== Critical response ===
On review aggregator website Rotten Tomatoes, the film holds an approval rating of 67% based on 43 reviews, with an average rating of 6.6/10. The website's critics consensus reads, "Memoir of War benefits from a magnetic performance by Mélanie Thierry, whose work is often enough to counter some of the film's fundamental flaws." Metacritic assigned the film a weighted average score of 57 out of 100, based on 12 critics, indicating "mixed or average reviews".

== See also ==
- List of submissions to the 91st Academy Awards for Best Foreign Language Film
- List of French submissions for the Academy Award for Best Foreign Language Film
