= An Impossible Love =

2018 film by Catherine Corsini

- Theatrical release poster
- French: Un amour impossible
- Directed by: Catherine Corsini
- Screenplay by: Catherine Corsini; Laurette Polmanss
- Based on: An Impossible Love by Christine Angot
- Produced by: Elisabeth Perez
- Starring: Virginie Efira; Niels Schneider; Jehnny Beth; Estelle Lescure; Coralie Russier; Iliana Zabeth; Ambre Hasaj; Sasha Alessandri-Torrès Garcia; Gaël Kamilindi; Simon Bakhouche
- Cinematography: Jeanne Lapoirie
- Edited by: Frédéric Baillehaiche
- Music by: Grégoire Hetzel
- Production companies: Chaz Productions; France 3 Cinéma; Artémis Productions; Le Pacte; VOO; BeTV; RTBF; Shelter Prod
- Distributed by: Le Pacte
- Release dates: 26 August 2018 (Angoulême); 7 November 2018 (France)
- Running time: 135 minutes
- Country: France
- Language: French

An Impossible Love (French: Un amour impossible) is a 2018 French romantic drama film co-written and directed by Catherine Corsini, based on the 2015 novel of the same name by Christine Angot. Starring Virginie Efira, Niels Schneider and Jehnny Beth, the film chronicles the life of office worker Rachel as she falls in love with the wealthy Philippe, gives birth to their daughter Chantal, and raises Chantal as a single mother while maintaining a complicated relationship with Philippe.

== Plot ==
In the late 1950s in Châteauroux, France, Rachel Steiner, a modest office secretary, meets Philippe Arnold, a brilliant young translator born to a rich bourgeois family. The two form a brief but passionate love affair. Philippe is often egotistical and condescending towards Rachel and her Jewish ethnicity, but she is too enamored by him to think otherwise. Rachel becomes pregnant and gives birth to a daughter, Chantal, but Philippe is hesitant to be bound by marriage.

Philippe visits Rachel and announces that he will marry a younger woman from a wealthy German family and that they are having a child. He insults Rachel as he refuses to marry outside of his social class or religion, and refuses to be part of his daughter's life. Rachel is devastated and expels him from the house, as she is forced to raise Chantal alone. Despite this, Philippe still wants sexual relations with Rachel, and she still overlooks his cynicism and amoral behaviour.

Years later, Rachel lives in Strasbourg and has a close bond with Chantal, who is now a 14 year-old teenager. Rachel campaigns for Philippe to legally acknowledge his daughter, which would give her legal rights and his last name, so that Chantal can form a relationship with him. Philippe initially agrees in a letter, but then backtracks and refuses. Finally, after much pressure, he acquiesces and Chantal's last name is changed to Arnold, just as she and Rachel start a new life in Reims.

On a visit, Philippe offers monthly payments for Chantal and wants to be more involved in his daughter's life. Chantal becomes more enamored by her father, who begins constantly spoiling her during his visits with lavish, extended trips and wealthy items beyond her mother's financial capabilities. Rachel becomes insecure as Chantal begins preferring Philippe and his treatment more than her. Chantal's growing dissatisfaction living modestly with her mother and her disgust at her parents' regular sexual flings strain her and Rachel's relationship.

Relations sour between Philippe and Chantal, making Rachel suspicious. The 16 year-old Chantal deliberately pursues a relationship with Franck, a 30 year-old man whom Rachel was also interested in, to spite her mother. Franck secretly informs Rachel that Chantal should not see her father anymore, as he has learned from Chantal that Philippe has been sexually abusing her. Rachel is horrified, but is unable to talk to her daughter about her abuse. The depressed Chantal severs ties with her father and her trauma further strains her relationship with her mother.

Many decades pass, and Rachel is now elderly and married to a man named Alain, who has dementia. The adult Chantal lives in Paris and lives with her partner and their daughter. Chantal reluctantly cares for and accompanies the elderly Philippe, who is suffering from Alzheimer's disease. After Philippe succumbs to his condition, Rachel visits Chantal, but Chantal is bitter at her mother for pushing a relationship with her father, resulting in her abuse, and sends her away.

Five years later, Rachel and Chantal reunite in a restaurant in Paris. The two discuss and reason Philippe's sexual abuse, humiliation, shame, and cruel behaviour which they both suffered over decades, before they decide to reconcile.

== Cast ==
- Virginie Efira as Rachel Steiner
- Niels Schneider as Philippe Arnold
- Jehnny Beth as Chantal Arnold
  - Ambre Hasaj as Chantal at 3–5 years old
  - Sasha Alessandri-Torrès Garcia as Chantal at 6–8 years old
  - Estelle Lescure as Chantal at 14-16 years old
- Simon Bakhouche as Alain
- Gaël Kamilindi as Franck

== Reception ==
In France, the film averages 3,7/5 on the AlloCiné from 32 press reviews. On the review aggregator website Rotten Tomatoes, 100% of 21 critics' reviews are positive, with an average rating of 7.3/10.
