= 2018 Cannes Film Festival =

- Official poster of the 71st Cannes Film Festival featuring Jean-Paul Belmondo and Anna Karina in Pierrot le Fou (1965)
- Opening film: Everybody Knows
- Closing film: The Man Who Killed Don Quixote
- Location: Cannes, France
- Founded: 1946
- Awards: Palme d'Or: Shoplifters
- Hosted by: Édouard Baer
- No. of films: 21 (In Competition)
- Festival date: 8–19 May 2018
- Website: festival-cannes.com/en

Cannes Film Festival
- 2019 2017

The 71st annual Cannes Film Festival took place from 8 to 19 May 2018. Australian actress Cate Blanchett served as jury president for the main competition. Japanese filmmaker Hirokazu Kore-eda won the Palme d'Or, the festival's top prize, for his drama film Shoplifters, marking Japan's first win after more than twenty years.

The official festival poster features Jean-Paul Belmondo and Anna Karina from Jean-Luc Godard's 1965 film Pierrot le Fou. It is the second time the festival poster was inspired by Godard's film after his 1963 film Contempt at the 2016 festival. According to festival's official statement, the poster is inspired by and paid tribute to the work of French photographer Georges Pierre.

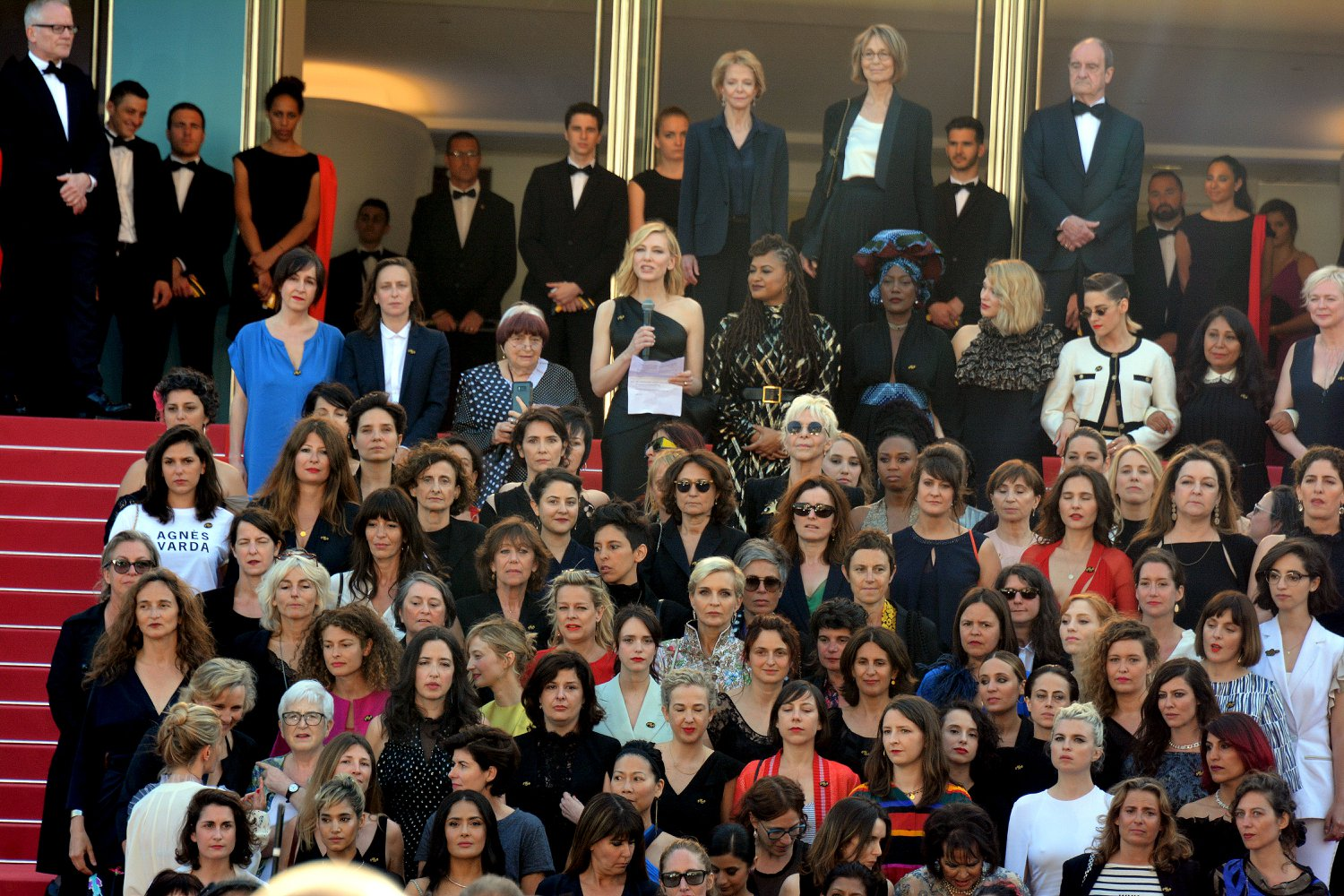
Demonstration by female filmmakers demanding equality between men and women in the film industry, 12 May.

The festival opened with Everybody Knows by Asghar Farhadi, and closed with The Man Who Killed Don Quixote by Terry Gilliam.

== Juries ==
=== Main competition ===
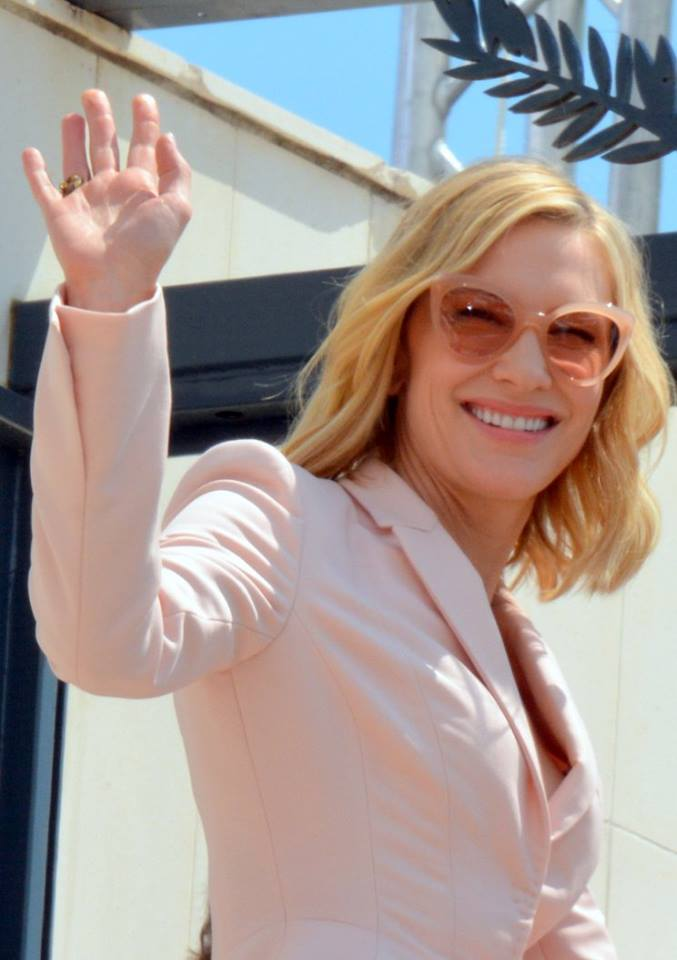
Cate Blanchett, President of the main competition Jury.

- Cate Blanchett, Australian actress – Jury President
- Chang Chen, Taiwanese actor
- Ava DuVernay, American filmmaker
- Robert Guédiguian, French filmmaker
- Khadja Nin, Burundian singer-songwriter
- Léa Seydoux, French actress
- Kristen Stewart, American actress
- Denis Villeneuve, Canadian filmmaker
- Andrey Zvyagintsev, Russian filmmaker

=== Un Certain Regard ===
- Benicio del Toro, Puerto Rican actor – Jury President
- Kantemir Balagov, Russian filmmaker
- Julie Huntsinger, American executive director of the Telluride Film Festival
- Annemarie Jacir, Palestinian filmmaker
- Virginie Ledoyen, French Actress

=== Camera d'Or ===
- Ursula Meier, Swiss film filmmaker – Jury President
- Marie Amachoukeli, French filmmaker
- Iris Brey, French-American critic and filmmaker
- Sylvain Fage, French president of Cinéphase
- Jeanne Lapoirie, French cinematographer
- Arnaud and Jean-Marie Larrieu, French filmmaker

=== Cinéfondation and Short Films Competition ===
- Bertrand Bonello, French filmmaker – Jury President
- Valeska Grisebach, German filmmaker
- Khalil Joreige, Lebanese artist and filmmaker
- Alantė Kavaitė, French-Lithuanian filmmaker
- Ariane Labed, French actress

=== Critics' Week ===
- Joachim Trier, Norwegian filmmaker – Jury President
- Nahuel Pérez Biscayart, Argentinian actor
- Eva Sangiorgi, Italian director of the Vienna International Film Festival
- Chloë Sevigny, American actress and filmmaker
- Augustin Trapenard, French culture journalist

=== L'Œil d'or ===
- Emmanuel Finkiel, French filmmaker – Jury President
- Lolita Chammah, French actress
- Isabelle Danel, French critic
- Kim Longinotto, British documentary filmmaker
- Paul Sturtz, American director of the True/False Film Festival

== Official selection ==
=== In Competition ===
The following films were selected to compete for the Palme d'Or:

English Title	Original Title	Director(s)	Production Country
3 Faces	سه رخ	Jafar Panahi	Iran
Asako I & II	寝ても覚めても	Ryusuke Hamaguchi	Japan
Ash Is Purest White	江湖儿女	Jia Zhangke	China
At War	En Guerre	Stéphane Brizé	France
Ayka	Айка	Sergey Dvortsevoy	Kazakhstan, Russia, France, Germany, Poland, China
BlacKkKlansman		Spike Lee	United States
Burning	버닝	Lee Chang-dong	South Korea, Japan
Capernaum	كفرناحوم	Nadine Labaki	Lebanon
Cold War	Zimna wojna	Paweł Pawlikowski	Poland, France, United Kingdom
Dogman		Matteo Garrone	Italy, France
Everybody Knows (opening film)	Todos lo saben	Asghar Farhadi	Spain, France, Italy
Girls of the Sun	Les filles du soleil	Eva Husson	France
Happy as Lazzaro	Lazzaro Felice	Alice Rohrwacher	Italy, Switzerland, France, Germany
The Image Book	Le livre d'images	Jean-Luc Godard	France, Switzerland
Knife+Heart (QP)	Un Couteau Dans Le Cœur	Yann Gonzalez	France, Mexico, Switzerland
Leto	Лето	Kirill Serebrennikov	Russia, France
Shoplifters	万引き家族	Hirokazu Kore-eda	Japan
Sorry Angel (QP)	Plaire, aimer et courir vite	Christophe Honoré	France
Under the Silver Lake		David Robert Mitchell	United States
The Wild Pear Tree	Ahlat Ağacı	Nuri Bilge Ceylan	Turkey, France, Germany, Bulgaria, North Macedonia, Bosnia and Herzegovina, Sweden
Yomeddine (CdO)	يوم الدين	Abu Bakr Shawky	Egypt

(CdO) indicates film eligible for the Caméra d'Or as a feature directorial debut.
(QP) indicates film in competition for the Queer Palm.

=== Un Certain Regard ===
The following films were selected to compete in the Un Certain Regard section:

English Title	Original Title	Director(s)	Production Country
El Angel (QP)	El Ángel	Luis Ortega	Argentina, Spain
Angel Face	Gueule d'ange	Vanessa Filho	France
Border (QP)	Gräns	Ali Abbasi	Sweden, Denmark
The Dead and the Others	Chuva é Cantoria na Aldeia dos Mortos	João Salaviza and Renée Nader Messora	Brazil, Portugal
Donbass (opening film)	Донбас	Sergei Loznitsa	Germany, Ukraine, France, Netherlands, Romania
Euphoria (QP)	Euforia	Valeria Golino	Italy
The Gentle Indifference of the World	Әлемнің жұмсақтық мазасыздығы	Adilkhan Yerzhanov	Kazakhstan, France
Girl (CdO) (QP)		Lukas Dhont	Belgium, Netherlands
The Harvesters (CdO)	Die Stropers	Etienne Kallos	South Africa, France, Poland, Greece
In My Room		Ulrich Köhler	Germany, Italy
Little Tickles (CdO)	Les Chatouilles	Andréa Bescond and Eric Métayer	France
Long Day's Journey into Night	地球最後的夜晚	Bi Gan	China, France
Manto	मंटो	Nandita Das	India
Murder Me, Monster	Muere, Monstruo, Muere	Alejandro Fadel	Argentina, France, Chile
My Favourite Fabric (CdO)	Mon tissu préféré	Gaya Jiji	France, Germany, Turkey
Rafiki (QP)		Wanuri Kahiu	Kenya
Sextape	À genoux les gars	Antoine Desrosières	France
Sofia (CdO)		Meryem Benm'Barek-Aloïsi	Morocco, Belgium

(CdO) indicates film eligible for the Caméra d'Or as a feature directorial debut.
(QP) indicates film in competition for the Queer Palm.

=== Out of Competition ===
The following films were selected to be screened out of competition:

English Title	Original Title	Director(s)	Production Country
Gotti		Kevin Connolly	United States
The House That Jack Built		Lars von Trier	Denmark, France, Germany, Sweden
The Man Who Killed Don Quixote (closing film)		Terry Gilliam	United Kingdom, Belgium, France, Portugal, Spain
Sink or Swim	Le Grand Bain	Gilles Lellouche	France
Solo: A Star Wars Story		Ron Howard	United States
Midnight Screenings
Arctic (CdO)		Joe Penna	Iceland, United States
Fahrenheit 451		Ramin Bahrani	United States
The Spy Gone North	공작	Yoon Jong-bin	South Korea
Whitney (QP)		Kevin Macdonald	United Kingdom

(CdO) indicates film eligible for the Caméra d'Or as a feature directorial debut.
(QP) indicates film in competition for the Queer Palm.

=== Special Screenings ===
The following films were selected be shown in the special screenings section:

English Title	Original Title	Director(s)	Production Country
Another Day of Life (ŒdO)	Jeszcze dzień życia	Damian Nenow and Raul De La Fuente	Poland, Spain, Germany, Belgium, Hungary
Dead Souls (ŒdO)	死靈魂	Wang Bing	France, Switzerland
The Great Mystical Circus	O Grande Circo Místico	Carlos Diegues	Brazil, Portugal, France
Pope Francis: A Man of His Word (ŒdO)p	Papst Franziskus - Ein Mann seines Wortes / Le pape François: un homme de parole	Wim Wenders	France, Germany, Italy, Switzerland
The State Against Mandela and the Others (ŒdO)		Nicolas Champeaux and Gilles Porte	France
Ten Years Thailand	สิบปีในประเทศไทย	Aditya Assarat, Wisit Sasanatieng, Chulayarnon Siriphol and Apichatpong Weerasethakul	Thailand
To the Four Winds	Libre	Michel Toesca	France
On the Road in France	La Traversée	Romain Goupil	France

(ŒdO) indicates film eligible for the Œil d'or for documentary feature.

=== Cannes Classics ===
The full line-up for the Cannes Classics section was announced on 23 April 2018.

English Title	Original Title	Director(s)	Production Country
Restorations
2001: A Space Odyssey (1968)		Stanley Kubrick	United States, United Kingdom
The Apartment (1960)		Billy Wilder	United States
Beating Heart (1940)	Battement de cœur	Henri Decoin	France
Bicycle Thieves (1948)	Ladri di biciclette	Vittorio De Sica	Italy
Blow for Blow (1972)	Coup pour coup	Marin Karmitz	France
Come and work (1979)	Fad’jal	Safi Faye	Senegal
Cyrano de Bergerac (1990)		Jean-Paul Rappeneau	France
Diamonds of the Night (1964)	Démanty noci	Jan Němec	Czechoslovakia
Driving Miss Daisy (1989)		Bruce Beresford	United States
Enamorada (1946)		Emilio Fernández	Mexico
Five and the Skin (1982)	Cinq et la peau	Pierre Rissient	France
Four White Shirts (1967)	Četri balti krekli	Rolands Kalniņš	Soviet Union
The Hour of the Furnaces (1968)	La hora de los hornos	Fernando Solanas	Argentina
Hyenas (1992)	Hyènes	Djibril Diop Mambéty	Senegal
The Island of Love (1982)	A Ilha dos Amores	Paulo Rocha	Portugal, Japan
João and the Knife (1972)	João e a faca	George Sluizer	Netherlands, Brazil
Lamb (1964)	La Lutte sénégalaise	Paulin Soumanou Vieyra	Senegal
The Nun (1966)	La Religieuse	Jacques Rivette	France
The Seventh Seal (1957)	Det sjunde inseglet	Ingmar Bergman	Sweden
Tokyo Story (1953)	東京物語	Yasujirō Ozu	Japan
War and Peace Part I (1966)	Война и мир	Sergei Bondarchuk	Soviet Union
Documentaries about Cinema
Be Natural: The Untold Story of Alice Guy-Blaché		Pamela B. Green	United States
Bergman – A Year in Life	Bergman — ett år, ett liv	Jane Magnusson	Sweden
The Eyes of Orson Welles (ŒdO)		Mark Cousins	United Kingdom
Jane Fonda in Five Acts		Susan Lacy	United States
Searching for Ingmar Bergman	À la recherche d'Ingmar Bergman	Margarethe von Trotta	Germany, France

(ŒdO) indicates film eligible for the Œil d'or as documentary.

=== Cinéma de la Plage ===
The Cinéma de la Plage is a part of the Official Selection of the festival. The outdoors screenings at the beach cinema of Cannes are open to the public.

Evening	English Title	Original Title	Director(s)	Production Country
Tuesday 8	The Firemen's Ball (1967)	Hoří, má panenko	Miloš Forman	Czechoslovakia
Wednesday 9	Black Panther (2018)		Ryan Coogler	United States
Thursday 10	The Specialists (1969)	Le Spécialiste	Sergio Corbucci	France, Italy, West Germany
Friday 11	The Big Blue (1988)	Le Grand Bleu	Luc Besson	France, United States, Italy
Saturday 12	The Departure (1967)	Le Départ	Jerzy Skolimowski	Belgium
Saturday 12	The Silence of the Lambs (1991)		Jonathan Demme	United States
Sunday 13	Destiny (1997)	المصير	Youssef Chahine	Egypt
Monday 14	One Sings, the Other Doesn't (1977)	L'une chante, l'autre pas	Agnès Varda	France
Tuesday 15	Vertigo (1958)		Alfred Hitchcock	United States
Wednesday 16	Grease (1978)		Randal Kleiser	United States
Thursday 17	Le grand bal (2018)		Laetitia Carton	France
Friday 18	Bagdad Cafe (1987)		Percy Adlon	West Germany
Saturday 19	Good Morning, Babylon (1987)	Buongiorno Babilonia	Paolo and Vittorio Taviani	Italy

== Parallel sections ==
=== Critics' Week ===
The following films were selected for the Critics' Week section:

English Title	Original Title	Director(s)	Production Country
Chris the Swiss (CdO)		Anja Kofmel	Switzerland, Croatia, Germany, Finland
Diamantino (CdO) (QP)		Gabriel Abrantes & Daniel Schmidt	Portugal, France, Brazil
Fugue	Fuga	Agnieszka Smoczyńska	Poland, Czech Republic, Sweden
One Day (CdO)	Egy Nap	Zsófia Szilágyi	Hungary
Sauvage (CdO) (QP)		Camille Vidal-Naquet	France
Sir (CdO)	Monsieur	Rohena Gera	India, France
Woman at War	Kona fer í stríð	Benedikt Erlingsson	Iceland, France, Ukraine
Special Screenings
Guy (closing film)		Alex Lutz	France
Our Struggles	Nos Batailles	Guillaume Senez	Belgium, France
Shéhérazade (CdO) (QP)		Jean-Bernard Marlin	France
Wildlife (opening film) (CdO)		Paul Dano	United States

(CdO) indicates film eligible for the Caméra d'Or as a feature directorial debut.
(QP) indicates film in competition for the Queer Palm.

==== Shorts ====
English Title	Original Title	Director(s)	Production Country
Amor, Avenidas Novas		Duarte Coimbra	Portugal
Hector Malot: The Last Day of the Year	Ektoras Malo: I Teleftea Mera Tis Chronias	Jacqueline Lentzou	Greece
Exemplary Citizen	Mo-Bum-Shi-Min	Kim Cheol-hwi	South Korea
Pauline Enslaved	Pauline asservie	Charline Bourgeois-Tacquet	France
La Persistente		Camille Lugan	France
Raptor / Rapace	Rapaz	Felipe Gálvez	Chile
Schächer		Flurin Giger	Switzerland
The Tiger	Tiikeri	Mikko Myllylahti	Finland
A Wedding Day	Un jour de marriage	Elias Belkeddar	Algeria, France
Normal	Ya normalniy	Michael Borodin	Russia
Special Screenings
The Fall	La chute	Boris Labbé	France
Third Kind		Yorgos Zois	Greece, Croatia
Ultra Pulpe		Bertrand Mandico	France

=== Directors' Fortnight ===
The following films were selected to be screened in the Directors' Fortnight section:

English Title	Original Title	Director(s)	Production Country
Amin		Philippe Faucon	France
Birds of Passage	Pájaros de verano	Cristina Gallego and Ciro Guerra	Colombia
Buy Me a Gun	Cómprame un Revólver	Julio Hernández Cordón	Mexico
Carmen and Lola (CdO) (QP)	Carmen y Lola	Arantxa Echevarria	Spain
Climax		Gaspar Noé	France
Dear Son	ولدي	Mohamed Ben Attia	Tunisia, Belgium, France
Leave No Trace		Debra Granik	United States
The Load (CdO)	Teret	Ognjen Glavonić	Serbia, France
Lucia's Grace	Troppa grazia	Gianni Zanasi	Italy
Mandy		Panos Cosmatos	United States
Mirai	未来のミライ	Mamoru Hosoda	Japan
The Pluto Moment	冥王星時刻	Ming Zhang	China
Petra		Jaime Rosales	Spain, France
Samouni Road	La strada dei Samouni	Stefano Savona	Italy, France
Los Silencios		Beatriz Seigner	Brazil, Colombia, France
The Snatch Thief	El Motoarrebatador	Agustin Toscano	Argentina
To the Ends of the World	Les Confins du Monde	Guillaume Nicloux	France
Treat Me Like Fire (CdO)	Joueurs	Marie Monge	France
The Trouble With You	En liberté!	Pierre Salvadori	France
The World Is Yours	Le Monde est à toi	Romain Gavras	France
Short Films
Basses		Félix Imbert	France
La Chanson		Tiphaine Raffier	France
Las Cruces		Nicolas Boone	France
La Lotta		Marco Bellocchio	Italy
This Magnificent Cake!	Ce magnifique gâteau!	Emma De Swaef and Marc Roels	Belgium
La Nuit des sacs plastiques		Gabriel Harel	France
The Orphan	O órfão	Carolina Markowicz	Brazil
Our Song to War		Juanita Onzaga	Colombia
Skip Day		Patrick Bresnan and Ivete Lucas	United States
The Subject	Le sujet	Patrick Bouchard	Canada

(CdO) indicates film eligible for the Caméra d'Or as a feature directorial debut.
(QP) indicates film in competition for the Queer Palm.

=== ACID ===
English Title	Original Title	Director(s)	Production Country
Alone at My Wedding	Seule à mon mariage	Marta Bergman	Belgium
Bad Bad Winter	Так Себе Зима	Olga Korotko	Kazakhstan
Cassandro the Exotico! (QP)		Marie Losier	France
In the Mighty Jungle	Dans la terrible jungle	Caroline Capelle and Ombline Rey	France
Love Blooms (QP)	L'Amour debout	Michaël Dacheux	France
Something is Happening	Il se passe quelque chose	Anne Alix	France
Thunder Road		Jim Cummings	United States
A Violent Desire For Joy	Un violent désir de Bonheur	Clément Schneider	France
We the Coyotes	Nous les Coyotes	Hanna Ladoul and Marco La Via	France, United States

(QP) indicates film in competition for the Queer Palm.

== Controversies ==
=== Netflix films ===
A ban on Netflix films in competition, which came about after the streaming giant refused to show them in French cinemas, has meant the issues of streaming and distribution have also been hot topics. The issue prompted Juror Ava DuVernay, who made 13th for Netflix, to make a plea for "flexibility of thought".

In March and April 2018, weeks before general delegate Thierry Frémaux was set to unveil the official selection, reports suggested streaming service Netflix was to pull its already-selected films from premiering at the festival in retaliation for the barring of Netflix films from competing. They were still allowed to premiere in other sections, and many reportedly opted for an Out of Competition berth. The films affected were Alfonso Cuarón's Roma, Morgan Neville's They'll Love Me When I'm Dead, Orson Welles' final film The Other Side of the Wind, Paul Greengrass' 22 July, and Jeremy Saulnier's Hold the Dark.

Ultimately, Netflix pulled all of their films from selection. Notably, in the press conference announcement, Frémaux commented that he wanted The Other Side of the Wind and had planned to screen it as a special screening with the Welles-related documentary They'll Love Me When I'm Dead. He also noted that he had selected Roma for competition.

=== Lars Von Trier ===
Danish film director Lars von Trier returned to Cannes with his film The House That Jack Built, after he was declared "persona non grata" at the 2011 festival.

=== Gender equality ===
The chair of the jury Cate Blanchett has called for gender parity at the Cannes Film Festival, calling it "almost a gladiatorial sport". However, she concedes that there has been improvements and the change "won't happen overnight".

During the festival, 82 female film professionals, led by Jury president Cate Blanchett and veteran director Agnès Varda, took part to a demonstration on the red carpet, demanding more equality between men and women in the film industry, notably the end of the pay gap.

The festival launched a sexual harassment hotline in partnership with France’s Ministry of Gender Equality where victims of harassment and abuse could receive support and guidance by calling a dedicated number.

=== Homophobia ===
French actor Éric Bernard, who was attending as part of the cast of the LGBTQ+ movie Sauvage, blamed the French film industry for the decline in his career, alleging that it was a consequence of homophobic bias. During an interview with 20 minutes in 2023, Bernard recalled that he went to the Cannes festival in 2018 and walked hand in hand with his husband, which caused Bernard's manager to scold him, advising to hide his relationship to protect his career.

== Official awards ==
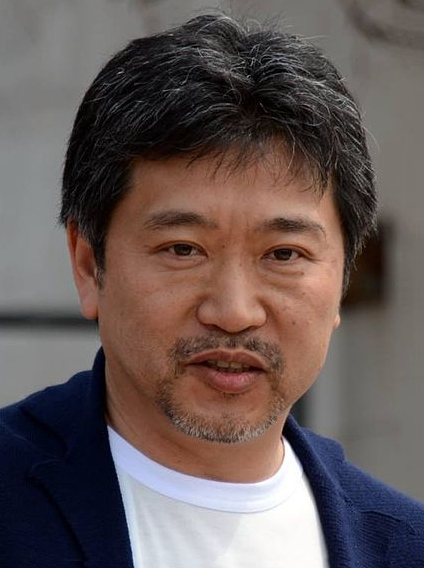
Hirokazu Kore-eda, Palme d'Or winner

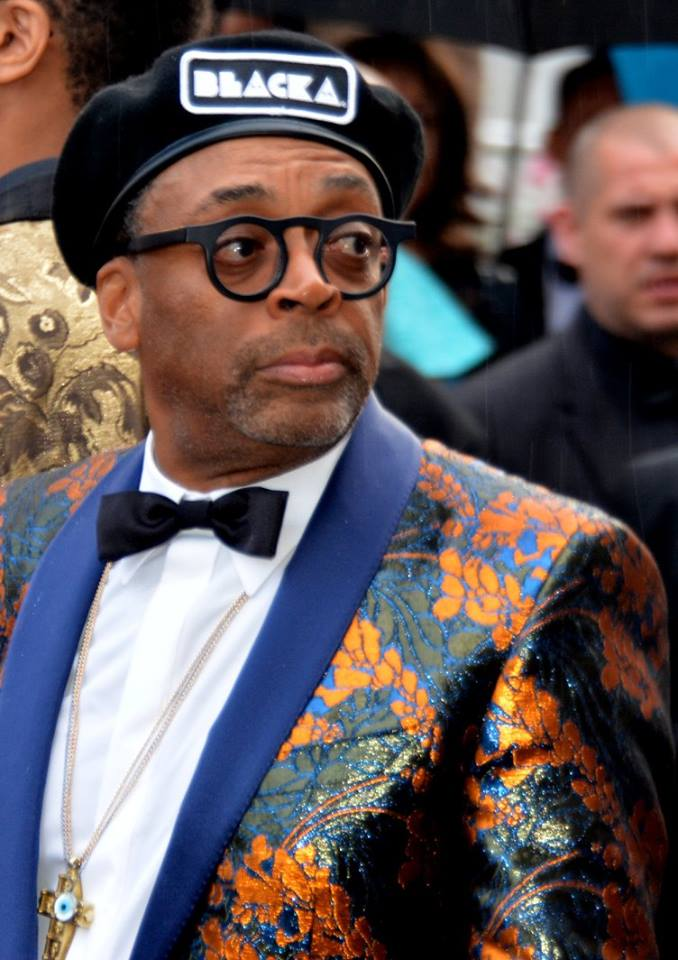
Spike Lee, Grand Prix winner

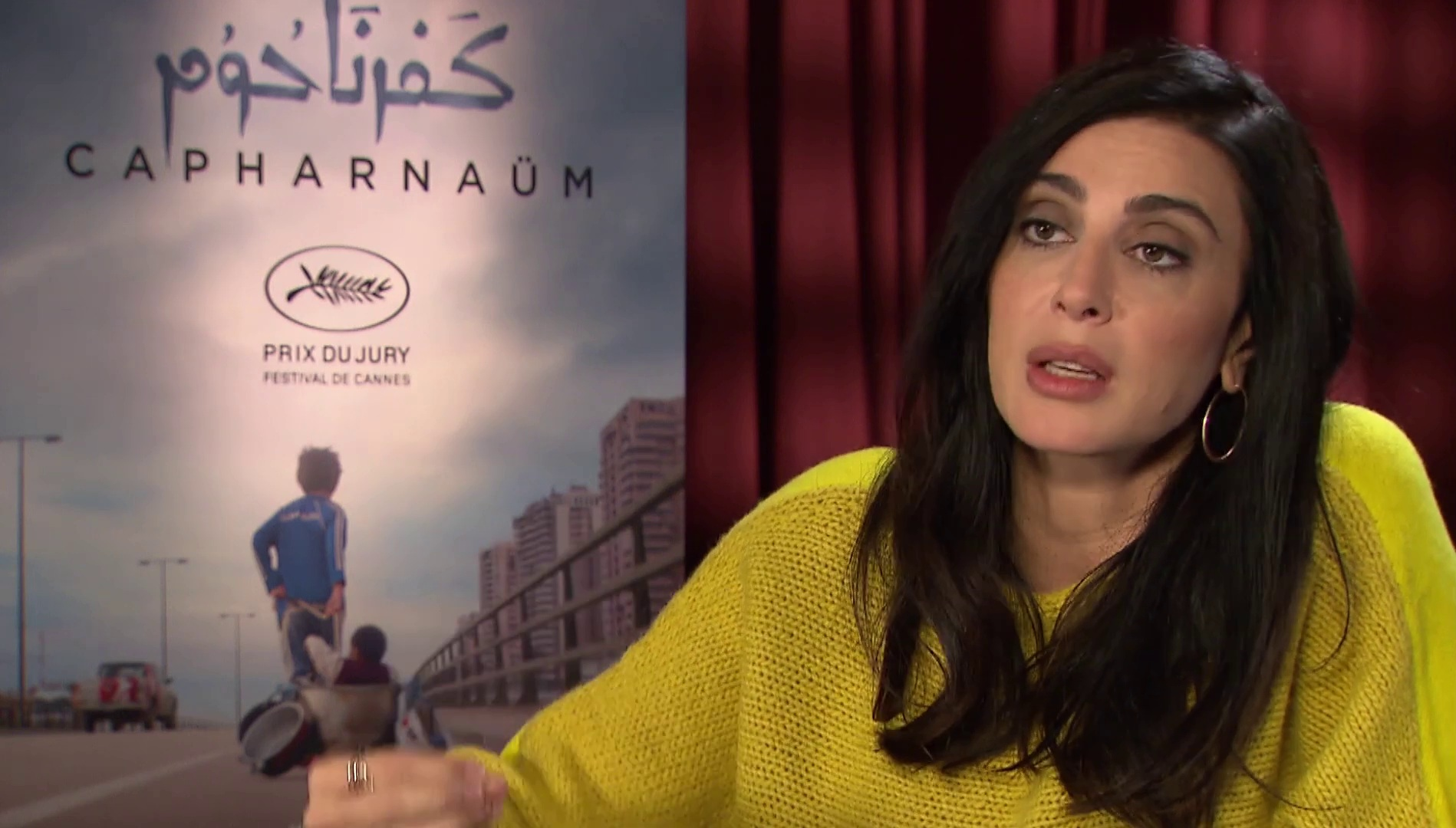
Nadine Labaki, Jury Prize winner

=== In Competition ===
- Palme d'Or: Shoplifters by Hirokazu Kore-eda
- Grand Prix: BlacKkKlansman by Spike Lee
- Best Director: Paweł Pawlikowski for Cold War
- Jury Prize: Capernaum by Nadine Labaki
- Best Screenplay:
  - Alice Rohrwacher for Happy as Lazzaro
  - Jafar Panahi and Nader Saeivar for 3 Faces
- Best Actress: Samal Yeslyamova for Ayka
- Best Actor: Marcello Fonte for Dogman
- Special Palme d'Or: The Image Book by Jean-Luc Godard

=== Un Certain Regard ===
- Un Certain Regard Award: Border by Ali Abbasi
- Un Certain Regard Jury Prize: The Dead and the Others by João Salaviza and Renée Nader Messora
- Un Certain Regard Award for Best Director: Sergei Loznitsa for Donbass
- Un Certain Regard Jury Award for Best Performance: Victor Polster for Girl
- Un Certain Regard Award for Best Screenplay: Meryem Benm'Barek-Aloïsi for Sofia

=== Cinéfondation ===
- First Prize: The Summer of the Electric Lion by Diego Céspedes
- Second Prize:
  - Calendar by Igor Poplauhin
  - The Storms in Our Blood by Shen Di
- Third Prize: Inanimate by Lucia Bulgheroni

=== Caméra d'Or ===
- Girl by Lukas Dhont

== Independent awards ==
=== FIPRESCI Prizes ===
- In Competition: Burning by Lee Chang-dong
- Un Certain Regard: Girl by Lukas Dhont
- Critics' Week: One Day by Zsófia Szilágyi

=== Prize of the Ecumenical Jury ===
- Capernaum by Nadine Labaki
  - Special Mention: BlacKkKlansman by Spike Lee

=== Critics' Week ===
- Nespresso Grand Prize: Diamantino by Gabriel Abrantes and Daniel Schmidt
- Leica Cine Discovery Prize for Short Film: Hector Malot: The Last Day of the Year by Jacqueline Lentzou
- Louis Roederer Foundation Rising Star Award: Félix Maritaud for Sauvage
- Gan Foundation Award for Distribution: Sir by Rohena Gera
- SACD Award: Woman at War by Benedikt Erlingsson and Ólafur Egill Egilsson
- Canal+ Award for Short Film: A Wedding Day by Elias Belkeddar

=== Directors' Fortnight ===
- Art Cinema Award: Climax by Gaspar Noé
- SACD Award: The Trouble with You by Pierre Salvadori
- Europa Cinemas Label Award: Lucia's Grace by Gianni Zanasi
- Illy Short Film Award: Skip Day by Ivete Lucas and Patrick Bresnan
- Carrosse d'Or: Martin Scorsese

=== L'Œil d'or ===
- Samouni Road by Stefano Savona
  - Special Mention:
    - Libre by Michel Toesca
    - The Eyes of Orson Welles by Mark Cousins

=== Queer Palm ===
- Girl by Lukas Dhont
- Short Film Queer Palm: The Orphan by Carolina Markowicz

=== Palm Dog ===
- Palm Dog Award: Canine cast of Dogman
- Grand Jury Prize: Diamantino
- Palm DogManitarian Award: Vanessa Davies and her pug Patrick
- Special Jury Prize: Security dogs Lilou, Glock and Even

=== Prix François Chalais ===
- Yomeddine by Abu Bakr Shawky

=== Vulcan Award of the Technical Artist ===
- Shin Joom-hee for Burning (art direction)

=== Cannes Soundtrack Award ===
- Roma Zver and German Osipov for Summer

=== Trophée Chopard ===
- Elizabeth Debicki
- Joe Alwyn
