= Portals (initiative) =

Public art initiative

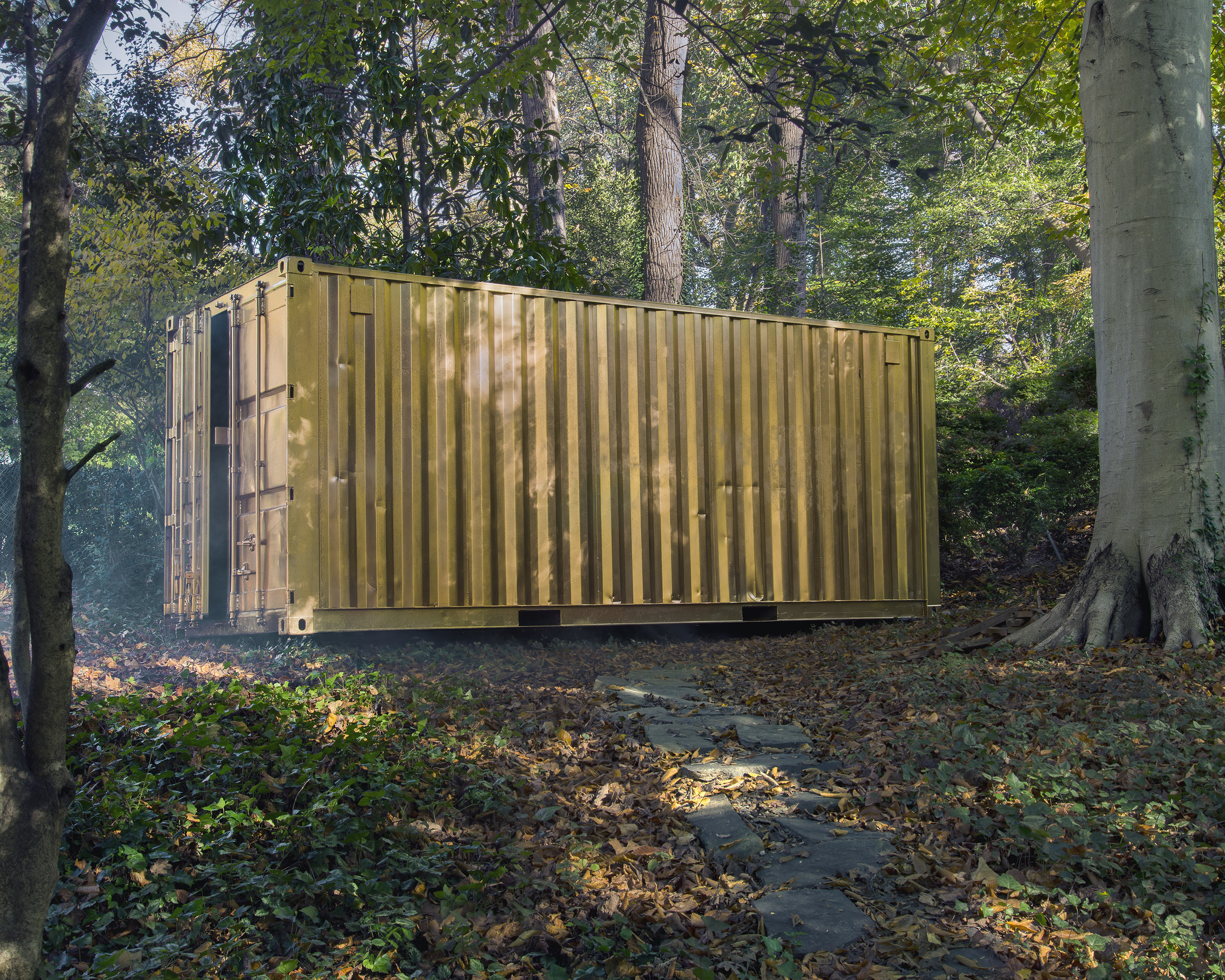
The original Portal, built in Washington DC, USA by artist Amar C. Bakshi in 2014.

Portals is a global public art initiative that connects people around the globe through real-time video audiovisual technology housed inside a gold-painted, converted shipping container or other structure. Individuals and groups enter local Portals and engage with individuals or groups in distant Portals through live, full-body video conferencing. The experience has been described as "breathing the same air." Portals are placed in public spaces such as public squares, museums, university campuses, high-level summits, and refugee camps. Participation is free, and the spaces are maintained by staff called Portal_Curators.

== History ==
The project was started in 2014 by artist Amar Bakshi, and initially connected the cities of New York and Tehran. According to Bakshi, he started the project "to connect people who wouldn't otherwise meet.” He had the idea to start the project after his days as a foreign journalist, where he launched How the World Sees America for The Washington Post. After returning from his time reporting, he realized he missed the conversations he had had with strangers he met around the world.

Bakshi, along with his art collective Shared Studios, has operated the project in nearly 50 cities around the world. Notable project participants have included U.S. president Barack Obama, UN Secretary General Ban Ki-moon, and Google founder Sergey Brin.

Artist Amar Bakshi built the first Portal in 2014. He launched Portals in collaboration with fellow journalist Michelle Moghtader and Iranian artist Sohrab Kashani. Bakshi began construction of the first Portal in his parents’ backyard in Washington, D.C. The first project connected participants in Lu Magnus art gallery in New York City, USA and Sazmanab Center for Contemporary Art in Tehran, Iran, and was in place for two weeks.

Computer science professor Omid Habibi then became interested in the project and decided to create a Portal at Hariwa University in Herat, Afghanistan, which then launched in March 2015.

The project has since expanded to over 40 cities around the world.

== Structure ==
The videoconferencing has been done through different platforms, including Zoom. According to Bakshi, he originally had wanted to strip the shipping containers of paint, buff them, and repaint them, but this process proved to be too expensive and bad for the environment. The decision to paint the shipping containers gold emerged through trial and error. He previously experimented with painting the container black, white, and silver, but he decided on the color gold because he felt it conveyed “sacredness.”

In some locations the video conferencing equipment is housed inside an existing building rather than a shipping container. In other locations the project operates inside a gold, inflatable portal.

Participation in the project is free, and those who wish to participate can often make appointments prior to arrival. The sessions typically last 20 minutes, and participants are asked an open-ended questions such as “What would make today a good day for you?” to get the conversation going. Interactions are sometimes aided by text translations or in-person translators.

== Notable Portal locations ==
Portals have been placed at the following locations:

- Amman, Jordan, at Fablab
- Aspen, USA at the 2016 Aspen Ideas Festival
- Austin, Texas at St. Edward's University and 2017 SXSW
- Baltimore, USA at Lexington Market
- Berlin, Germany at Tempelhof Airport
- Boulder, Colorado at University of Colorado Boulder
- Brooklyn, USA at the New Lab
- Chicago, USA at Chicago Ideas Week 2016
- College Park, USA at the University of Maryland
- El Progreso, Honduras with Organization for Youth Empowerment
- Erbil, Iraq at the Harsham IDP Camp with UNICEF
- Gaza City, Palestine at Gaza Sky Geeks
- Greenwich, USA at Greenwich Academy
- Havana, Cuba with Vistar Magazine
- Herat, Afghanistan at Hariwa University
- Isfahan, Iran
- Kigali, Rwanda at Impact Hub Kigali with Kurema Kureba Kwiga
- Los Angeles, USA at Grand Park
- London, UK at Campus London
- Mission, USA with Mission Economic Development District
- Mexico City, Mexico at Museo Tamayo and Center for Digital Culture
- Mumbai, India at the 2017 Mumbai Marathon
- Newark, USA at Military Park
- New York City, USA at the United Nations Headquarters, UNGA 2015 and UNGA 2016, Lu Magnus Gallery and Danese/Corey Gallery
- Oxford, UK at 2017 Skoll World Forum
- Park City, USA at the 2015 Sundance Film Festival with Airbnb
- Palo Alto, USA at Stanford University and the 2016 Global Entrepreneurship Summit with Google for Entrepreneurs
- Rye, USA at Rye Arts Center
- San Francisco, USA at ProxySF
- Seoul, South Korea at Campus Seoul
- Tehran, Iran at the Sazmanab Center for Contemporary Art
- Washington, DC at the U.S. Holocaust Memorial Museum, the U.S. Capitol, the Woodrow Wilson Plaza, and Georgetown University
- Yangon, Myanmar
- Za'atari, Jordan
- Davos, Switzerland (for the World Economic Forum)

== Notable guests ==
Portal participants include:

- Barack Obama
- Ban Ki-moon
- Haider Al-Abadi
- Samantha Power
- Ewan McGregor
- Fareed Zakaria
- Doug Liman
- Morgan Spurlock
- Amy Chua
- Robert Post
- Vint Cerf
- Tom Friedman
