= Éric Bernard (actor) =

French actor (born 1982)

- Born: Farid-Éric Pierre Bernard; 18 April 1982 (age 44); Paris, France
- Occupation: Actor
- Notable work: Sauvage (2018)

Farid-Éric Pierre Bernard (born 18 April 1982) is a French actor.

After starring in the 2018 film Sauvage, Bernard came out as a gay man, and subsequently went through a decline in his career which newspaper 20 minutes blamed on homophobia in French cinema.

== Early life ==
Bernard was born in Paris, France, on 18 April 1982, to Tunisian parents who abandoned him when he was four months old. After that, he entered into the foster care system until being adopted by the Bernards, a French couple. They gave the boy their surname and added Pierre as a middle name for him. The family moved frequently, living in Nantes, Dijon, and Reims before settling in Évreux, the capital commune of the Eure department.

While recalling his childhood as beautiful, Bernard deeply disliked Évreux, describing the place as "cold, damp, and sad", adding that he began to suffer from depressive feelings. Bernard said that in his desire to return to Paris, he got a job at the age of 17 and moved back to the capital; he took various jobs including waiter, dishwasher, and receptionist, saying that he did not want to be a burden on his parents.

In 1999, one of Bernard's friends sent a casting application on his behalf, and urged him to go. He began as an extra, and had his first major role in a film on France 2, after which he got an agent.

== Career ==
In 2011, Bernard was in the Christophe Sahr film Voie rapide. Two years later, he was cast for the Philippe Godeau film 11.6.

Bernard's breakthrough role came in the 2018 film Sauvage of Camille Vidal-Naquet, where he played a gay sex worker. The explicit sexual content and exposure of his genitals in the film caused controversy. Bernard's acting career had a sharp decline after Sauvage; Laure Beaudonnet of 20 minutes blamed homophobia in French cinema as a probable cause.

Sauvage was selected for the Critics' Week of the 2018 Cannes Film Festival and also won the Best Film award at the 44th César Awards. Bernard's co-star in the film is actor Félix Maritaud, who is also gay. Maritaud portrays a gay sex worker in Bois de Boulogne seeking tenderness and longing for love while also battling against drug addiction. Maritaud's character meets a masculine gay man (Bernard) who is also involved in prostitution and a life project.

The film received mostly positive reviews from critics. Magazine Télérama said that the "poetic and unsettling" ending was noteworthy while Les Inrockuptibles called the film "sensational". Bernard said he received fewer calls to audition after his role in Sauvage and that he faced hostility while attending the Cannes Film Festival. He and his husband recalled to 20 minutes that Bernard's agent at the time, who is also gay, scolded them for holding hands on the red carpet, warning Bernard that publicly showing their relationship could reduce his future chances of being cast as a straight man.

After Sauvage, Bernard ended the contract with his manager, and made minor appearances in other films. In 2020, he took part in the South Korean film The Man Standing Next, where he got a role as a French henchman. Four years later, Bernard joined the cast of the film Serpent's Path, portraying a police officer. He also appeared as a cruise ship captain in the TV film À qui profite le doute?

In 2020, lesbian actress Muriel Robin alleged that homophobia was prevalent in the French film industry and that she knew gay and lesbian actors who concealed their sexuality because there were no successful careers for those who came out. Bernard supported Robin's theory and expressed similar concerns, receiving support from actor Raphaël Lenglet, who described Bernard as having an "undeniable raw talent" and high levels of professionalism. His former agent argued that being gay was not an issue for Bernard, instead pointing to strategic mistakes by his new agent. Bernard has argued against these claims and denied any mismanagement by his new agent.

== Personal life ==
Bernard is gay, and is married.

In a November 2006 interview with Le Parisien, Bernard told reporter Elodie Le Maou that a friend had advised him to capitalise on his Tunisian background and pursue a career in the Tunisian film industry, an idea which Bernard disliked and rejected.

== Selected filmography ==
Year	Title	Notes
2002	Les Monos	Television drama
2011	Voie rapide	Drama film
2013	11.6	Philippe Godeau production
2018	Sauvage	Breakthrough role. Starred along Félix Maritaud
2020	The Man Standing Next	South Korean film
2024	Serpent's Path	Film by Kiyoshi Kurosawa
