= Argo Factory =

Contemporary art museum in Tehran, Iran

- کارخانه آرگو
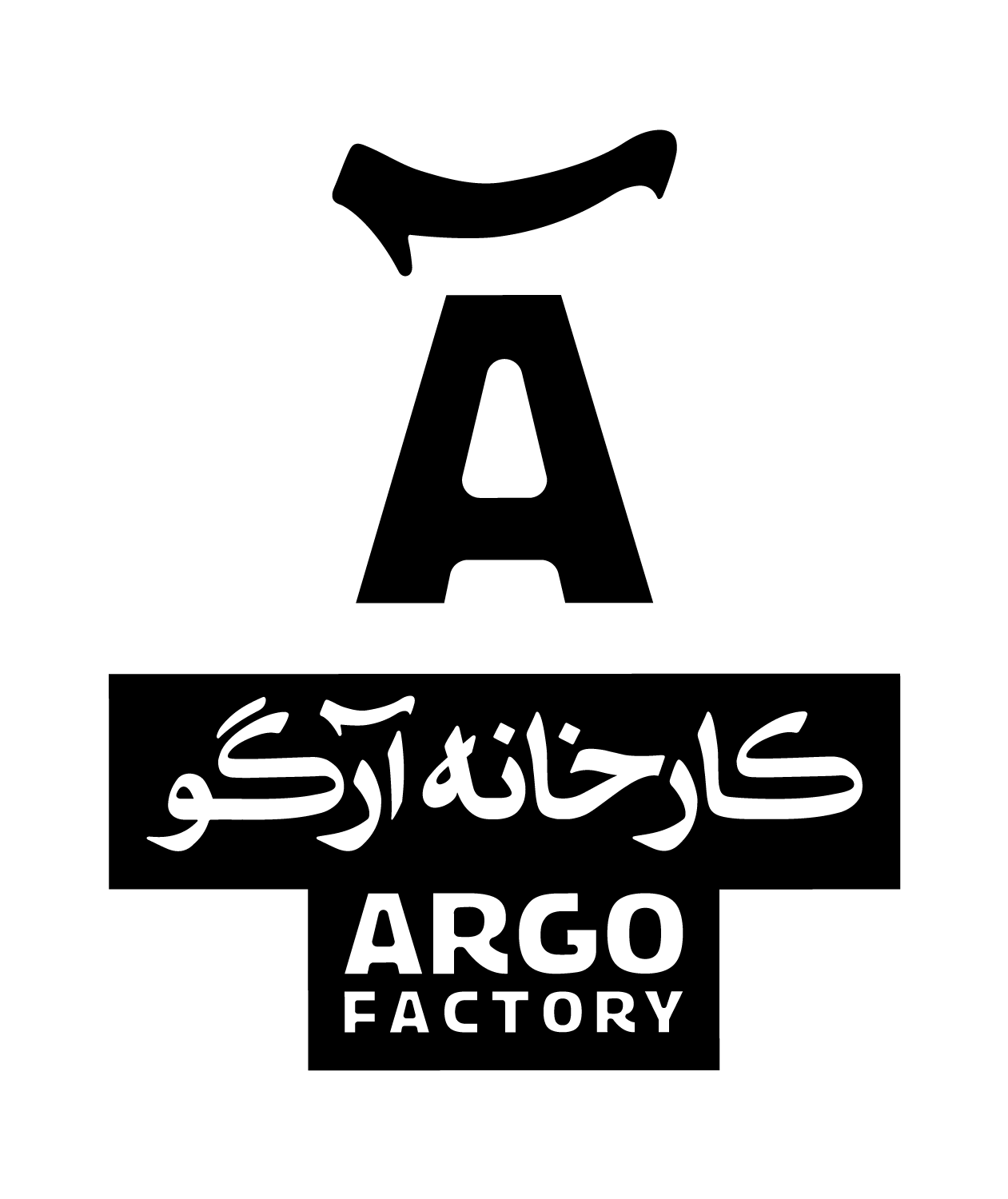

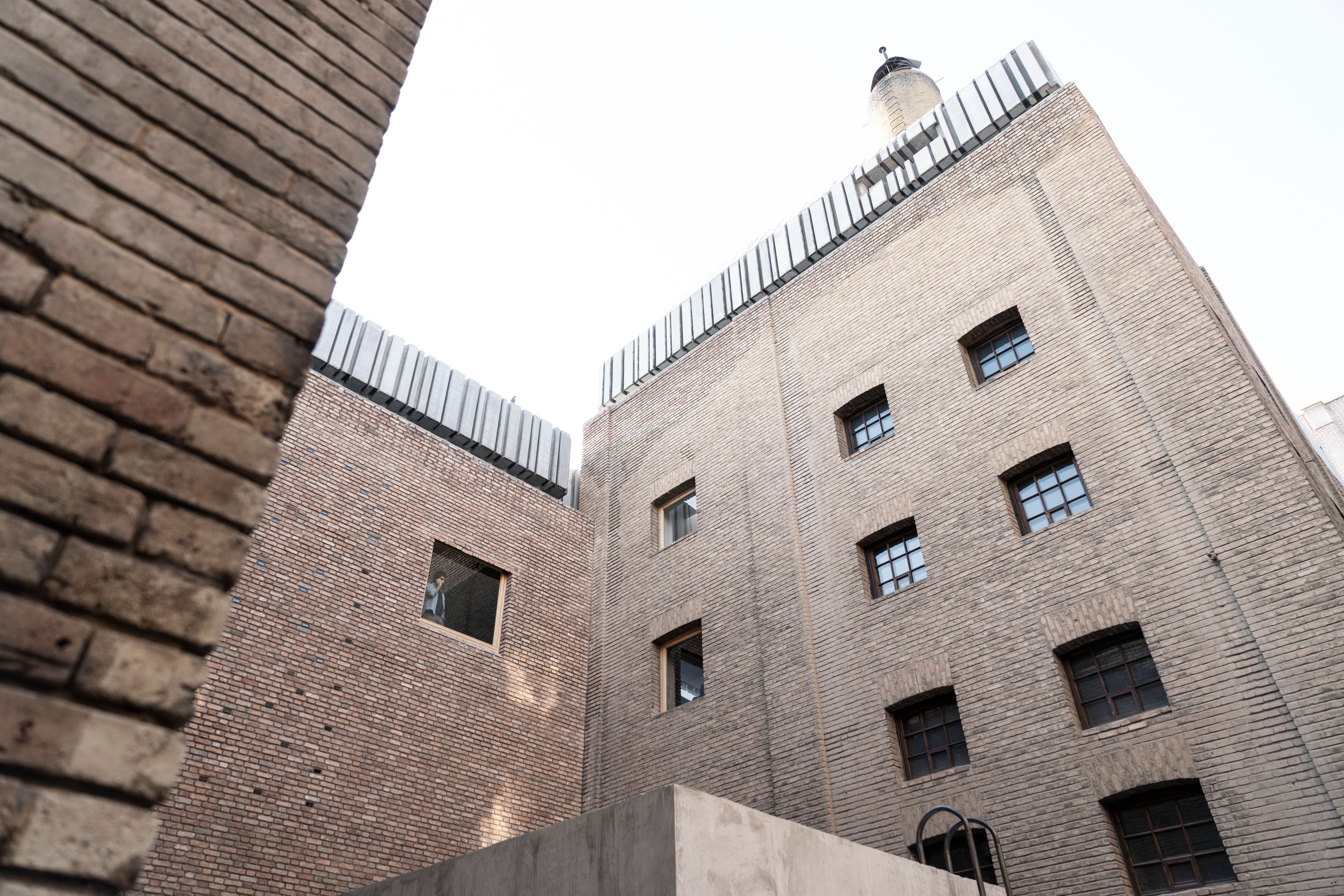
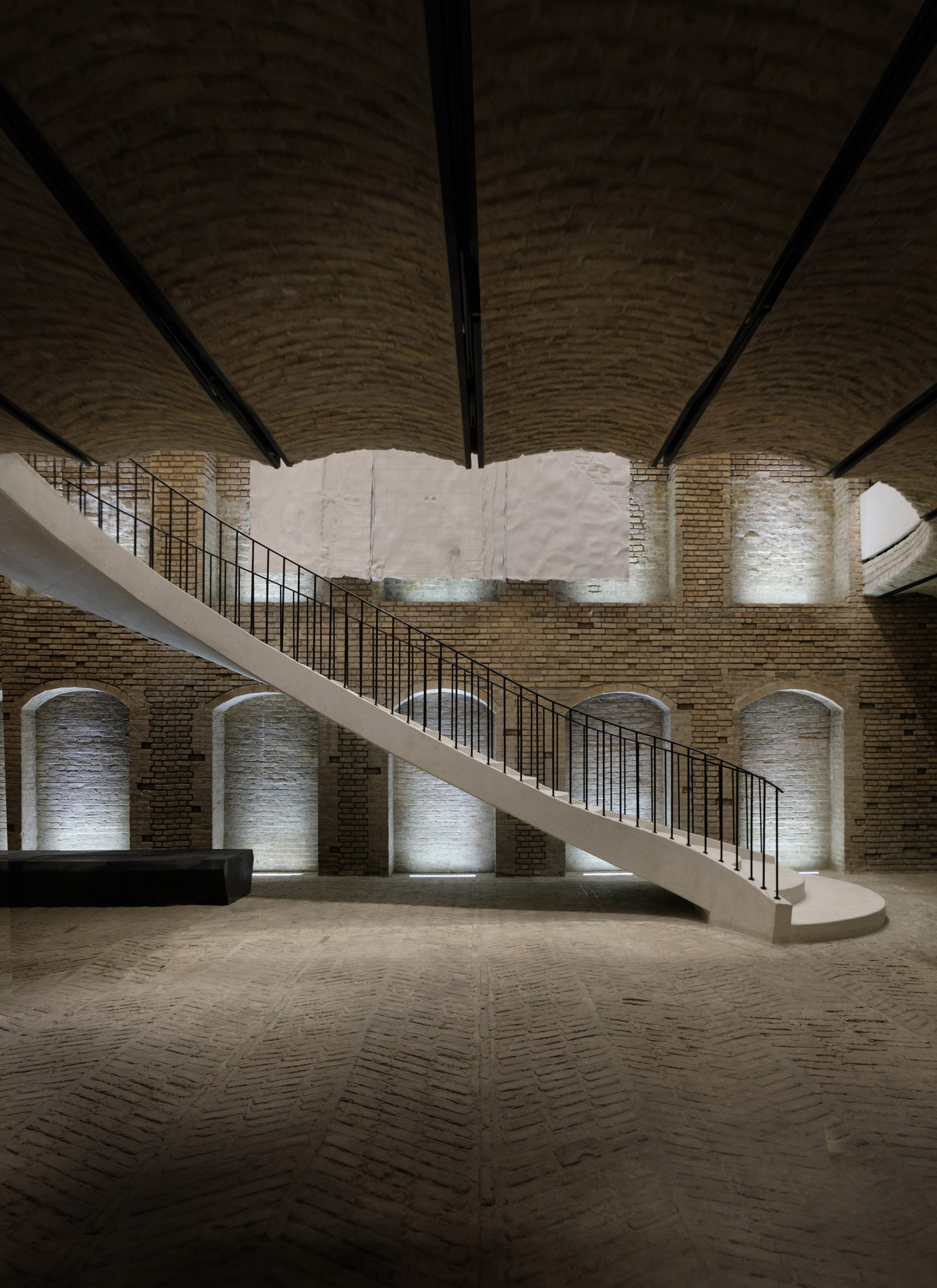
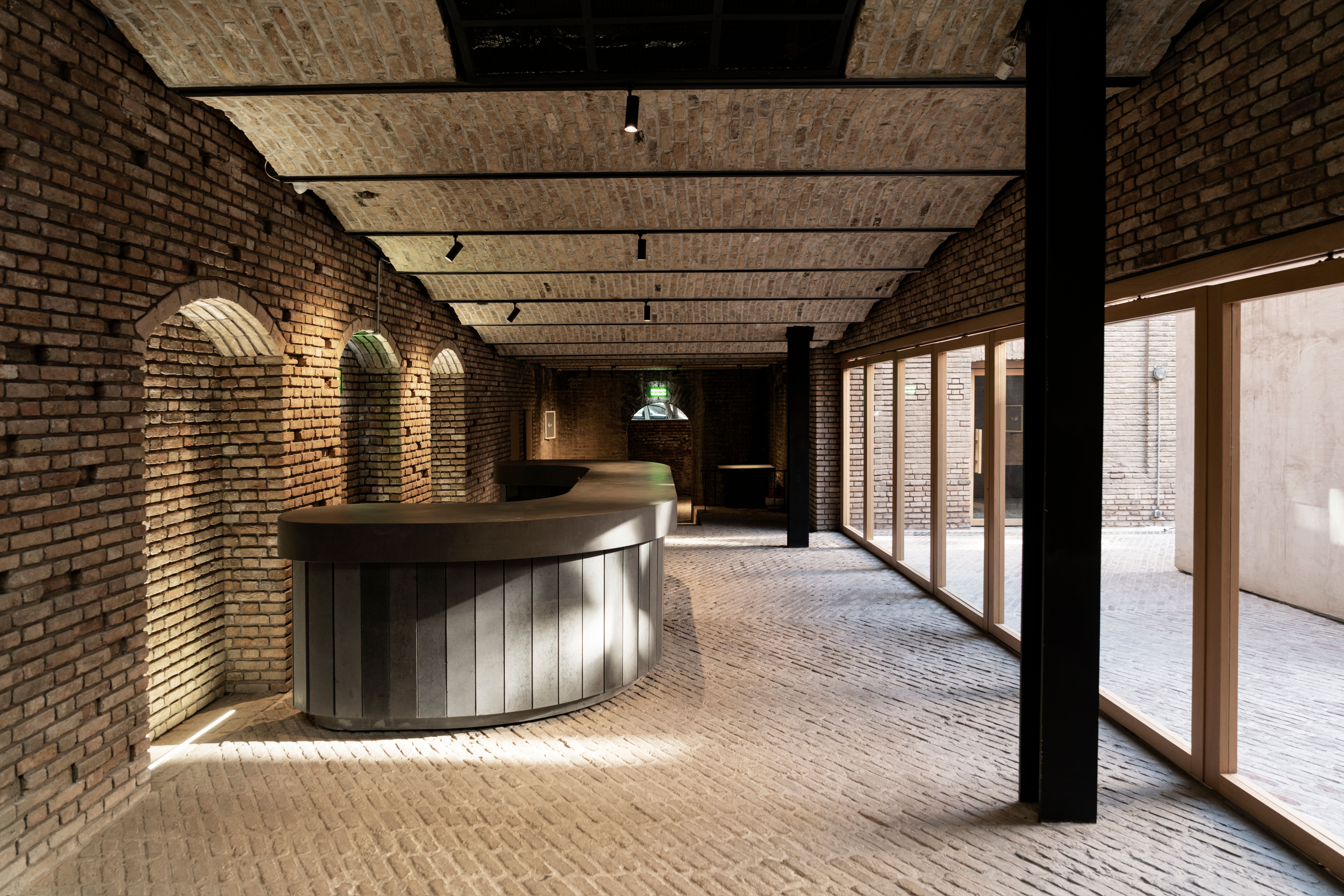

- Location within Iran
- Established: 2015
- Location: Tehran, Iran
- Coordinates: 35°41′57″N 51°25′18″E
- Type: Nonprofit Art museum
- Founder: Hamidreza Pejman
- Architect: ASA North — Ahmadreza Schricker
- Website: https://pejman.foundation/argofactory/

Argo Factory (Persian: کارخانه آرگو), is a contemporary art museum and cultural centre housed in a former brewery in Tehran, Iran. Argo Factory is part of the Pejman Foundation’s sites.

== History ==
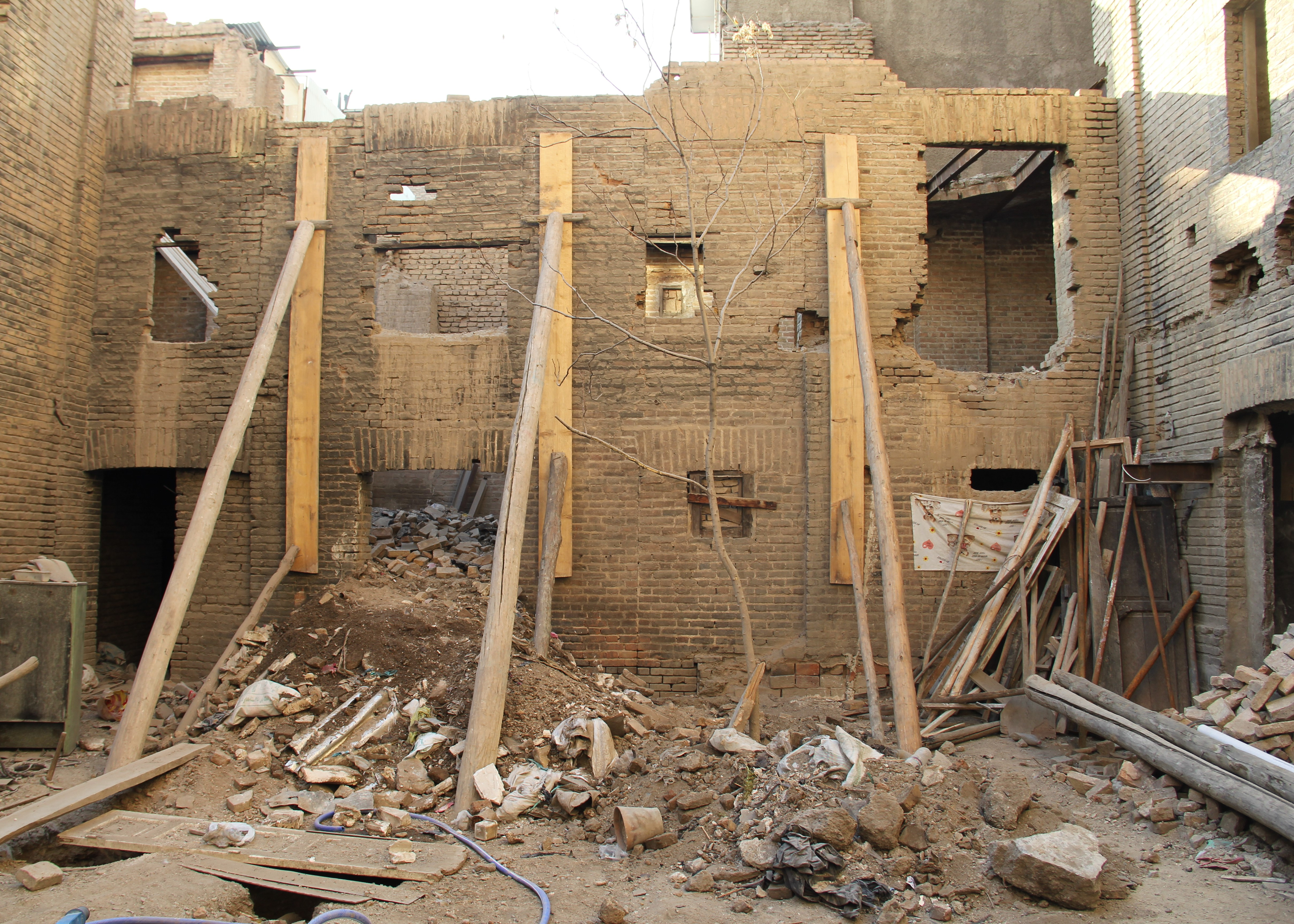
The factory before reconstruction

Constructed in the early 1920s, Argo Factory was one of the first industrial factories in Iran. In the 1960s, it became a major drink manufacturing factory until environmental issues led to its permanent closure in the 1970s.

In 2016, Pejman Foundation acquired and reconstructed the factory. The factory got its name, Argo, from "the name of the beer once made there".

== Architecture ==
In spite of its unique architectural features – high smokestacks and strategic geographical position at the heart of the city – the factory was neglected for years and eventually turned into a tumbledown building for almost four decades.

== Restoration ==
=== Structural Foundations ===
The new underpinning structure, designed by structural engineer Behrang Bani Adam, allows the architectural expression to maintain a restrained conversation between the old metal (halabi) roofs of Tehran houses and new floating (concrete) roofs of the museum that are the only new addition to the exterior form of the original factory. The design taps into the DNA of traditional local metal roofs and rewrites them as five performative floating roofs: each considering an unrepeated lighting atmosphere, for the cultural program underneath it. The restoration of the Argo Factory began with addressing its deteriorated structure. To stabilize the building, the team inserted new structural foundations, crucial for its long-term preservation. The architects retained the original load-bearing brick walls, which expressed the industrial character of the factory. This decision balanced structural safety with historical integrity. By maintaining the walls, the project respected the original materials while integrating contemporary design solutions.

=== Elevated Concrete Roofs ===
At the Argo Factory, five elevated concrete roof volumes rise 50 centimeters above the original brick walls, discreetly concealing climate control and mechanical systems within the Roof. This design not only enables efficient integration of modern infrastructure but also allows natural light to filter into the 8.5-meter-high galleries. Inspired by Tehran’s traditional halabi (metal) roofs, the new addition respectfully contrasts the historic structure, while the use of concrete—necessitated by sanctions—reinforces the site's industrial identity.

=== Spatial Expansion of Argo Factory ===
The project significantly expanded the building’s original footprint by approximately 85%, increasing the area from 480 m² to 1,890 m². Argo Factory stands as Tehran's first private contemporary art museum established since the 1979 Iranian Revolution. It offers artists versatile spaces with varied ceiling heights reaching up to 15 meters, providing greater flexibility for exhibitions and installations. Now a prominent cultural hub in the city, the factory attracts both local and international visitors. Its successful transformation has also inspired the renovation of surrounding buildings, playing a key role in the cultural revival of downtown Tehran.

The factory has undergone two phases of renovation, the most recent during 2018/19. In partnership with New-York based architecture firm ASA North, Argo Factory was transformed from nearly four decades of desertion, winning awards such as the Aga Khan Award for Architecture in 2022.

== Awards ==
Due to its special design, Argo factory received a lot of attention and managed to receive major architectural awards at the global level.

In 2022, this building, along with two other Iranian projects, among 463 submitted works from 16 countries, was included in the list of final candidates for the Aga Khan Award for Architecture, and from this list, six projects were selected as the final winners. Argo Factory, redesigned by Ahmadreza Schricker (ASA North), was among these winners. The Aga Khan Award for Architecture is given in three-year periods.

Argo Factory also won the 2022 Dezeen Architecture Award, organized by the Dezeen website. These awards include three categories: architecture, interior and design, with 14 categories in each category. Finally, the final winner will be selected from each section and will be honored as the three special works of Dezeen Architecture Award.

In the fifth edition of these awards, Argo Factory was among the names of selected projects in the final stage or short list of this international competition in the cultural buildings section, and became the final winner of this section and also became the Dezeen Awards 2022 architecture project of the year.

== Programs ==
Argo Factory is part of Pejman Foundation’s constellation of sites. Pejman Foundation supports art and culture through a program of exhibitions, talks, and events.

=== Exhibitions ===
- Neïl Beloufa - 2017
- Nose to Nose - Slavs and Tatars - 2017
- Elsewhere Interactive VR Installation - 2018
- Nazgol Ansarinia: The Room Becomes a Street - 2020
- “For the sake of Calmness” A project by Newsha Tavakolian - 2020
- “In the Midst” vol. 1 - 2021
- Video at Large Selection of videos from the collection of Paris Museum of Modern Art - 2021
- Mohsen Vaziri Moghaddam: Unrealised Projects - 2021
- Vanishing Point; A Selection of Pejman Collection - 2022
- “Truth Lies not in One Dream, but in Many” The One Thousand and One Nights of Pasolini narrated by Roberto Villa’s Photos - 2022
- Remembrance of Things Present; An Exhibition by ASA-North - 2023

== See also ==
- Art exhibition
- Modern and contemporary art in Iran
- Nonprofit organization
