= The Image Book =

2018 collage film by Jean-Luc Godard

- Film poster
- French: Le Livre d'image
- Directed by: Jean-Luc Godard
- Written by: Jean-Luc Godard
- Produced by: Fabrice Aragno; Mitra Farahani; Hamidreza Pejman
- Narrated by: Jean-Luc Godard
- Cinematography: Fabrice Aragno
- Edited by: Jean-Luc Godard
- Production companies: Casa Azul Films; Ecran Noir Productions Pejman Foundation
- Distributed by: Wild Bunch
- Release date: 11 May 2018 (Cannes)
- Running time: 88 minutes
- Countries: Switzerland; France
- Languages: French; English; Arabic; German; Italian

The Image Book (French: Le Livre d'image) is a 2018 Swiss avant-garde essay film written and directed by Jean-Luc Godard. It was his final feature film before his death in 2022.

Initially titled Tentative de bleu and Image et parole, in December 2016 Wild Bunch co-chief Vincent Maraval stated that Godard had been shooting the film for almost two years "in various Arab countries, including Tunisia" and that it is an examination of the modern Arabic world. Godard told Séance magazine that he was shooting without actors but the film would have a storyteller.

The film had its world premiere at the main competition of the 2018 Cannes Film Festival, where it was awarded an unprecedented "Special Palme d'Or" by the jury as an homage to his career and as an award to the film itself. The film was positively received by film critics.

== Synopsis ==
In line with the rest of Godard's late-period oeuvre, The Image Book is composed of a series of films, paintings and pieces of music tied together with narration and additional original footage by Godard and Anne-Marie Miéville. Similar to his earlier series Histoire(s) du cinéma (and sometimes using some of the exact same film quotes), the film examines the history of cinema and its inability to recognise the atrocities of the 20th and 21st centuries (specifically the Holocaust, ISIS and the Israeli–Palestinian conflict), the responsibilities of the filmmaker and the advances in political discourse with the introduction of consumer-grade digital cameras and iPhones.

== Release ==
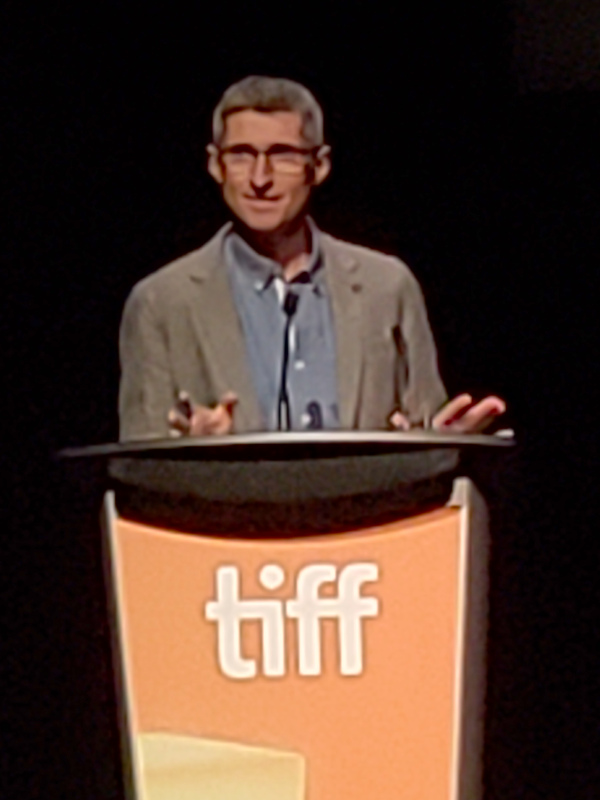
Producer Fabrice Aragno presenting The Image Book at the 2018 Toronto International Film Festival

The Image Book premiered on 11 May 2018 at the Cannes Film Festival. Although it did not win the official prize, the jury awarded it the first (and only) "Special Palme d'Or" in the festival's history. According to Godard, the film is intended to be shown on TV screens with speakers at a distance, in small spaces rather than in regular cinemas. It was shown in this way during its first run at the Théâtre Vidy-Lausanne in November 2018.

The film was released on Blu-ray by Kino Lorber in the United States on May 21, 2019.

== Reception ==
The film has a 90% approval rating on Rotten Tomatoes, based on 88 reviews, with an average rating of 7.6/10. The critics' consensus on it being stated as, "Potentially insurmountable for viewers not attuned to the director's wavelength, The Image Book is typically confounding - and ultimately rewarding - late-period Godard." It also holds a 76/100 on Metacritic. It was named the best film of 2019 by Cahiers du cinéma.

Richard Brody of The New Yorker gave high praise to the film, seeing it as "a sort of epilogue or sequel" to Godard's earlier work Histoire(s) du cinéma, and stated that the film centers around one theme: "the inadequate depiction of what he calls 'the Arab world' and, in particular, the dearth of iconic movie images from the Middle East—which he presents as a failure of the cinema itself, as well as of the world at large." For Bilge Ebiri, film critic for The Village Voice, the film was engaging in its editing of footage taken from varying sources, but Ebiri also shared an initial bafflement toward the film and the meaning of its chosen imagery until he conversed with Egyptian critic Joseph Fahim; Fahim shared to Ebiri that with the film's informed use of images from Middle Eastern cinema, Godard was attempting to deconstruct the Western narrative given to Arab societies and the Western influence on how cinema's history is recorded. Fahim added that "The images introduced by Godard in here are unknown to most Western critics who waxed poetic about the film."

On the other hand, Todd McCarthy of The Hollywood Reporter gave it a negative review stating that:

"As with his previous idiosyncratic, often inscrutable late works, this will be seen only by a highly select audience of dedicated Godardians, and genuinely liked by just a fraction of those; one can essentially name them."

David Sexton of The London Evening Standard called it "a magic lantern show gone wrong".
