= Pejman Foundation =

Art Foundation

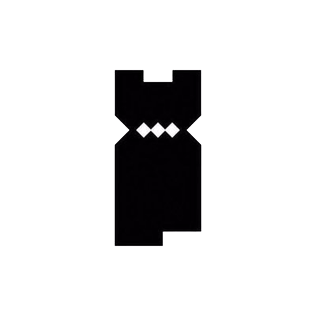
- Established: 2015
- Location: Tehran
- Founder: Hamidreza Pejman
- Website: http://pejman.foundation/

The Pejman Foundation is an Iranian nonprofit art foundation, established by Hamidreza Pejman in 2015, to promote art in a space free of nationality and geographical boundaries, and to connect the common aspects of art and philosophy. Throughout recent years, the activities of Pejman Foundation have expanded beyond building its collection and its grant and sponsorship program. Through the organization of workshops, lectures, and panel discussions, the invitation of international experts, its artist exchange programs, as well as its support for cultural research and publications, Pejman Foundation has become a creative hub for art practitioners and initiatives in Iran and abroad. Today, Pejman Foundation supports art and culture through a vibrant program of exhibitions, talks, and events at its multiple sites, including Argo Factory and Kandovan.

== Sites ==
The foundation's activities are held at three sites in Tehran:

- Argo Factory – the foundation headquarters, Argo Factory, which in the 1960s and 70s produced beverages, was, built in the 1920s and is one of the first industrial factories in the country. Although quite specific in terms of architecture, with its very tall chimney, and its geographical location at the heart of the city, the building was abandoned for forty years, and its owners were blocked from re-assuming ownership. In line with its long-term goal to establish a non-profit exhibition space and cultural center, Pejman Foundation decided to acquire the factory from the state and engaged in its restoration. In October 2016 and under the supervision of architect Ali Shakeri (Shiar Studio), the process of restoration and revival began and after a gap to hold two exhibitions, the second phase of the process went ahead under the supervision of the architect Ahmadreza Schricker (ASA NORTH). Due to its special design, Argo factory managed to receive many architectural awards at the global level. In 2022, this building, along with two other Iranian projects, among 463 submitted works from 16 countries, was included in the list of final candidates for the Aga Khan Award for Architecture, and from this list, six projects were selected as the final winners. Argo Factory, redesigned by Ahmadreza Schricker (ASA North), was among these winners. Argo Factory also won the 2022 Dezeen Architecture Award, organized by the Dezeen website. This annual award includes three categories: architecture, interior, and design, with 14 categories in each category. Finally, the final winner will be selected from each section and will be honored as the three special works of Dezeen Architecture Award. In the fifth edition of these awards, Argo Factory was among the names of selected projects in the final stage or short list of this international competition in the cultural buildings section, and became the final winner of this section. Argo Factory also won the Dezeen Awards 2022 architecture project of the year.
- Kandovan – a non-profit project space that in collaboration with local and international artists and curators, hosts a variety of events and exhibitions at its space. Kandovan also takes part in international cultural programmes and collaborates and creates exchanges with a variety of art spaces all over the world. Kandovan endeavors to appropriately bridge the gulf between arts and artists from Iran and other nations. Through holding a variety of events, artist talks, studio visits, and small exhibitions in tandem with its artist exchange programme, Kandovan has become an essential link in the chain that connects local and international art practitioners, artists with spaces, and spaces with artists.
- Café Musée Project – a platform for projects and events inside the Tehran Museum of Contemporary Art.

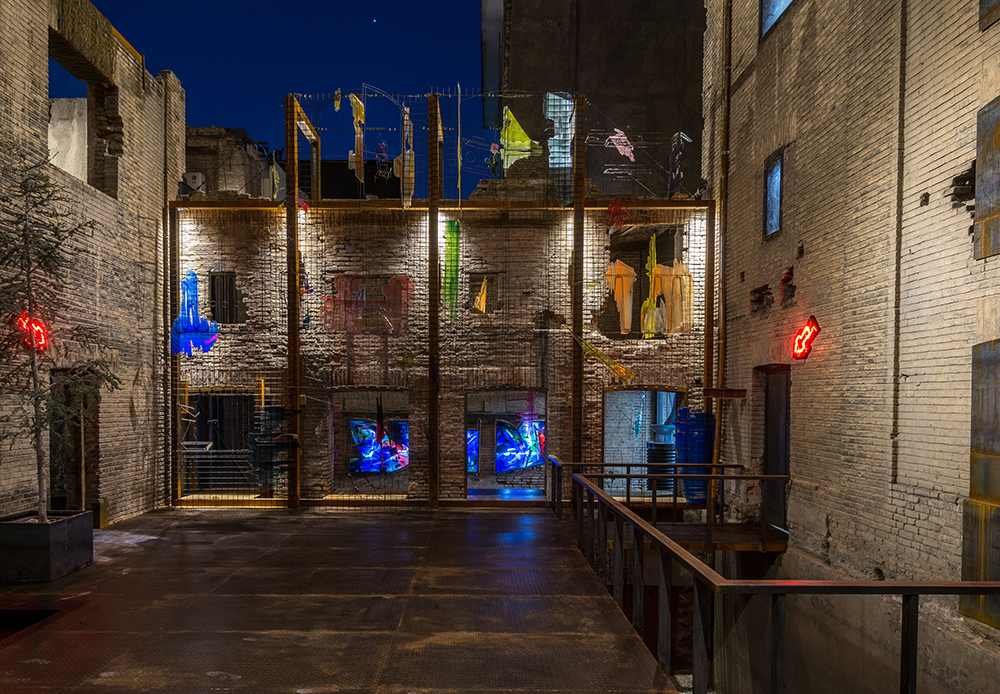
Neil Beloufa's exhibition at Pejman Foundation: Argo Factory in February 2017

== Artists and exhibitions ==
A partial list of artists who have worked with the foundation:

- 2023 Remembrance of Things Present; An Exhibition by ASA-North
- 2022 Truth Lies Not in One Dream, but in Many The One Thousand and One Nights of Pasolini narrated by Roberto Villa
- 2022 Vanishing Point, a selection of works from the Pejman collection
- 2021-2022 Mohsen Vaziri Moghaddam: Unrealised Projects, featuring Dynamic Sculptures from Small to Monumental 1968-2018, curated by Hamoon Vaziri Moghaddam
- 2021 Video at Large Selection of videos from the collection of the Paris Museum of Modern Art curated by Odile Burluraux and Jessica Castex
- 2020 In the Midst vol.1, three solo exhibitions presenting works by Iranian Artists; Neda Saeedi, Ali Meer Azimi, and Mohammad Hassanzadeh
- 2020 For the Sake of Calmness A Project by Newsha Tavakolian, Iranian Artist, featuring a movie and layout designed by Ahmadreza Schricker.
- 2019 The Room Becomes a street by Nazgol Ansarinia, Iranian artist, featuring drawings, videos, sculptures, installation, and publication curated by Aram Mosahyedi
- 2018: "Bal Umagbe La" by Sebastian Bieniek, a German artist, featuring photography, drawing, and performance art at the Kandovan Building. Curated by Robbie Vafai, opened 13 to 20 August 2018.
- 2017-2018: "Elsewhere" by South Korean filmmaker, documentarian and animator Hayoun Kwon, and French film director Balthazar Auxietre, featuring an interactive virtual reality art installation, including Auxietre's "The Cave", in which the audience can experience an ice age cave with prehistoric cave paintings.
- 2017: "Nose to Nose", by Slavs and Tatars, at the Argo Factory location, featuring sculptures, audio works and publications.
- 2017: "Shattered Frames: Recent video work from Iran", curated by Sohrab Kashani, originally shown at the Carnegie Museum of Art in Pittsburgh, Pennsylvania in 2016.
