= Carlos Noronha Feio =

Portuguese artist

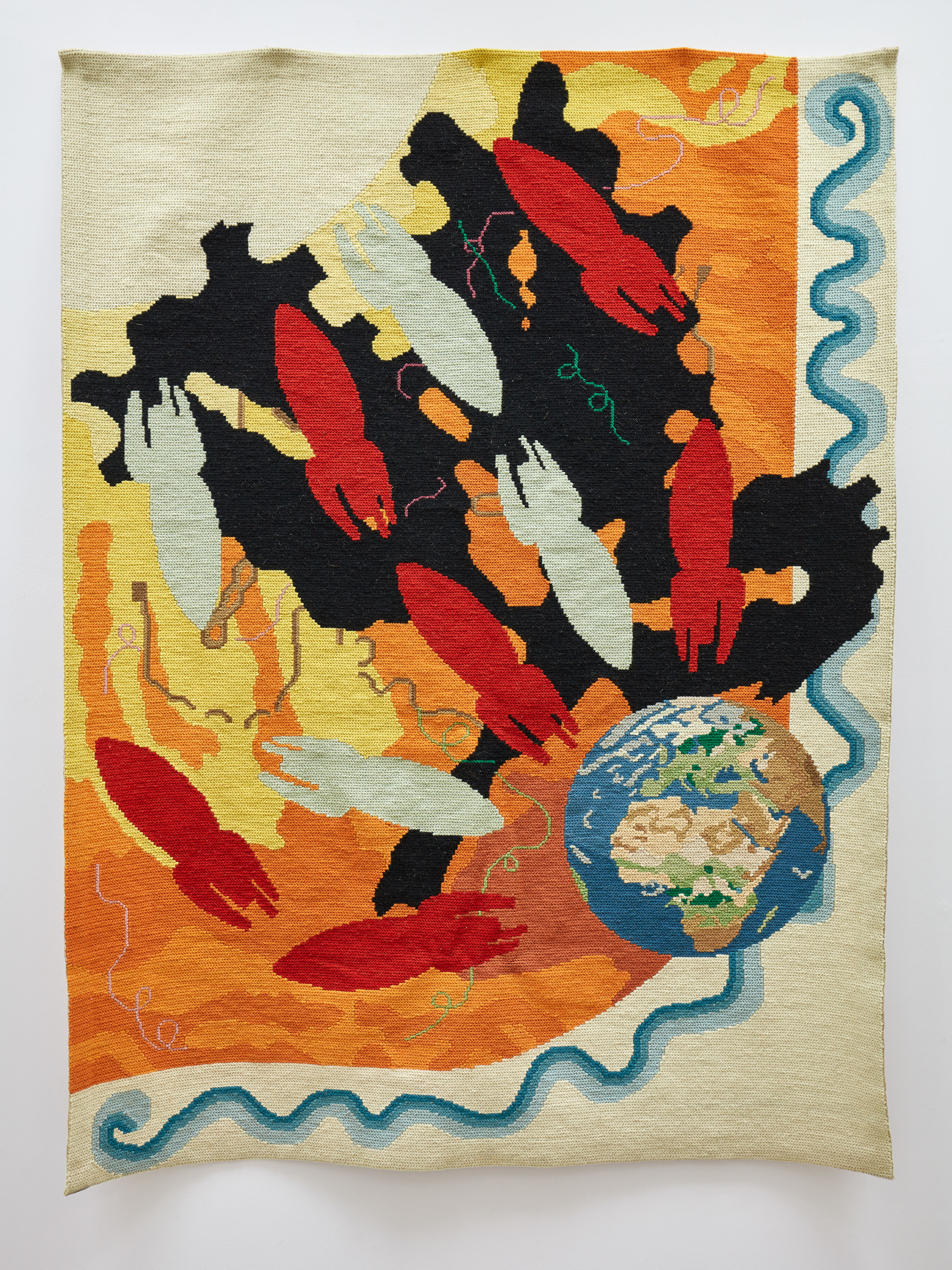
Arraiolos wool rug artwork by Carlos Noronha Feio, 2018.

Carlos Noronha Feio (born 1981) is a Portuguese artist. He works in a variety of media, including video, painting, digital, textile and book works, occasionally requiring craftspeople and industrial makers such as in a series of war rugs made in the Arraiolos tradition.

Noronha Feio holds a PhD from the Royal College of Art London. The title of his thesis is Practices of everyday emancipation: an artists' toolkit

Noronha Feio’s recent projects include (sunclipse!)/(sunsight!) a public art commission by Kunsteverein am Rosa-Luxemburg-Platz at Rosa-Luxemburg-Strasse 27&28 The Fabric of Felicity at Garage Museum of Contemporary Art in Moscow, New Art Dealers Alliance - NADA Miami Beach 2019 Sculpture Park in Miami USA, 'Futures' at Contemporary Art Centre (Vilnius), even if at heart we are uncertain of the will to connect, there is a common future ahead at narrative projects in London, (sunsight!)/(sunclipse!) at 3+1 Arte Contemporânea in Lisbon, Matter of Trust at Nottingham Contemporary, Nottingham,As you do on Earth at Galerie Iragui in Moscow, Oikonomia: a Matter of Trust at National Museum of Contemporary Art (Portugal) in Lisbon, You Are Now Entering_________ at CCA Londonderry/Derry in Northern Ireland, Image Wars at Abrons Arts Center in New York, The Flag: Instruction Manual #2 at Sazmanab Platform for Contemporary Art, Tehran, andDa outra margem do Atlântico: alguns exemplos da fotografia e do video português at Centro Cultural Helio Oiticica in Rio de Janeiro.

Noronha Feio’s work is included in the publicationsThe Art of Not Making: The New Artist/Artisan Relationship as well as in Nature Morte: Contemporary Artists Reinvigorate the Still Life Tradition, published by Thames & Hudson.

He is present in several private and public collections including MAAT—Fundação EDP in Lisbon, Saatchi Collection in London, and Museu de Arte do Rio in Rio de Janeiro, National Museum of Contemporary Art (Portugal) in Lisbon, Portuguese State Collection.

In 2020 Casa da Cerca - Centro de Arte Contemporânea, inaugurated a new permanent outdoor text sculptural artwork (crescei flores!)

From 2009 up to 2014 he was a director of The Mews Project Space in London’s Whitechapel, with Mikael Larsson.
