= Amar Bakshi =

Artist (b. 1984)

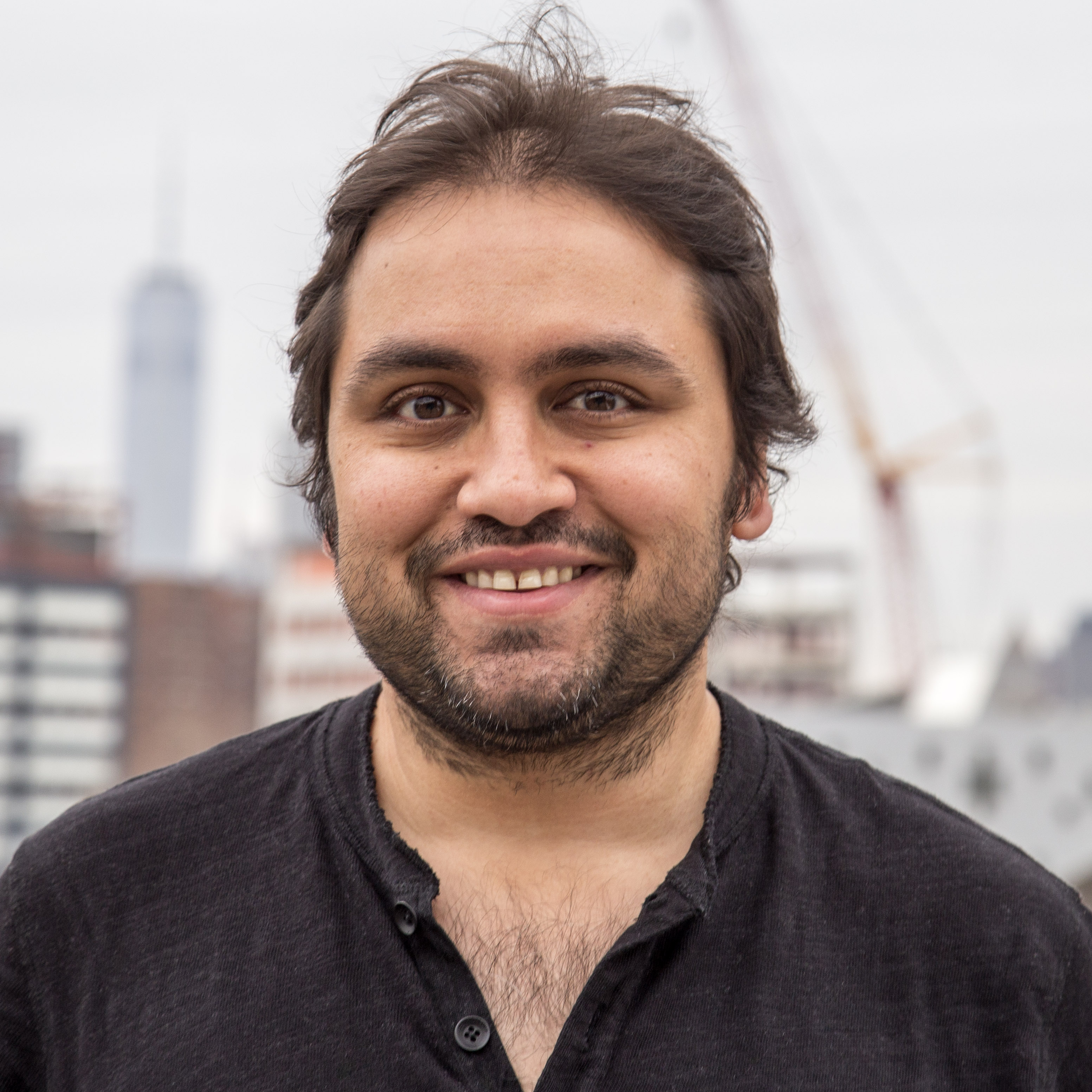
- Born: Amar C. Bakshi; May 12, 1984 (age 42); Washington, D.C., USA
- Education: Harvard University
- Occupations: Artist, creative director
- Known for: Portals, Shared Studios
- Website: www.sharedstudios.com

Amar C. Bakshi (born May 12, 1984) is an artist and founder of Shared Studios and Portals. Bakshi lives and works in Brooklyn, New York.

== Early life and education ==
Bakshi was born in Washington DC, USA. He went to high school at St. Albans and attended Harvard University, Johns Hopkins School of Advanced International Studies, and Yale Law School. He won a Truman Scholarship in 2005 and a Soros Scholarship in 2013.

== Career ==
=== The Washington Post ===
Bakshi began working at the Washington Post. He created the video blog How the World Sees America. It featured daily articles, which include text and short video clips, about citizens around the world impacted by the United States politically, economically and culturally.

=== The Legal Medium ===
Bakshi is the founder of The Legal Medium, which explores how artists use law as material with notable academics including Jack Balkin and Keller Easterling, and artists including Mary Ellen Carroll, Liam Gillick, and Tehching Hsieh.

=== Shared Studios ===
In 2014, Bakshi created the global initiative Portals, initially connecting the cities of New York and Tehran in gold shipping containers. Portals are gold spaces equipped with immersive audiovisual technology. When you enter a Portal, you come face-to-face with someone in a distant Portal live and full-body, as if in the same room. Bakshi started the project "to connect people who wouldn't otherwise meet”.
