= Anahita Razmi =

Iranian-German visual artist (b. 1981)

- آناهیتا رزمی
- Born: 1981 (age 44–45); Hamburg, Germany
- Education: Bauhaus University, Weimar, Pratt Institute, State Academy of Fine Arts Stuttgart
- Occupation: Visual artist
- Known for: Installation art, performance art, video art, sculpture, photography
- Website: www.anahitarazmi.de

Anahita Razmi (b.1981; Persian: آناهیتا رزمی) is a German-born contemporary artist, of Iranian and German descent. She works with installation, sculpture, video art, and performance. Razmi's work deploys an art processes of appropriation, in which the meaning(s) of existing images are altered by situating them in another temporal context. Her work often deals with both political and social issues, ones in fact that are often related to Iran, the homeland of Razmi's father. She lives in Berlin, and London.

== Early life and education ==
Anahita Razmi was born in 1981 in Hamburg, Germany. Her mother is German, and her father is Iranian.

She studied media art at Bauhaus University, Weimar; followed by classes at Pratt Institute in New York City; and continued her studies in fine art and sculpture at State Academy of Fine Arts Stuttgart.

== Career ==
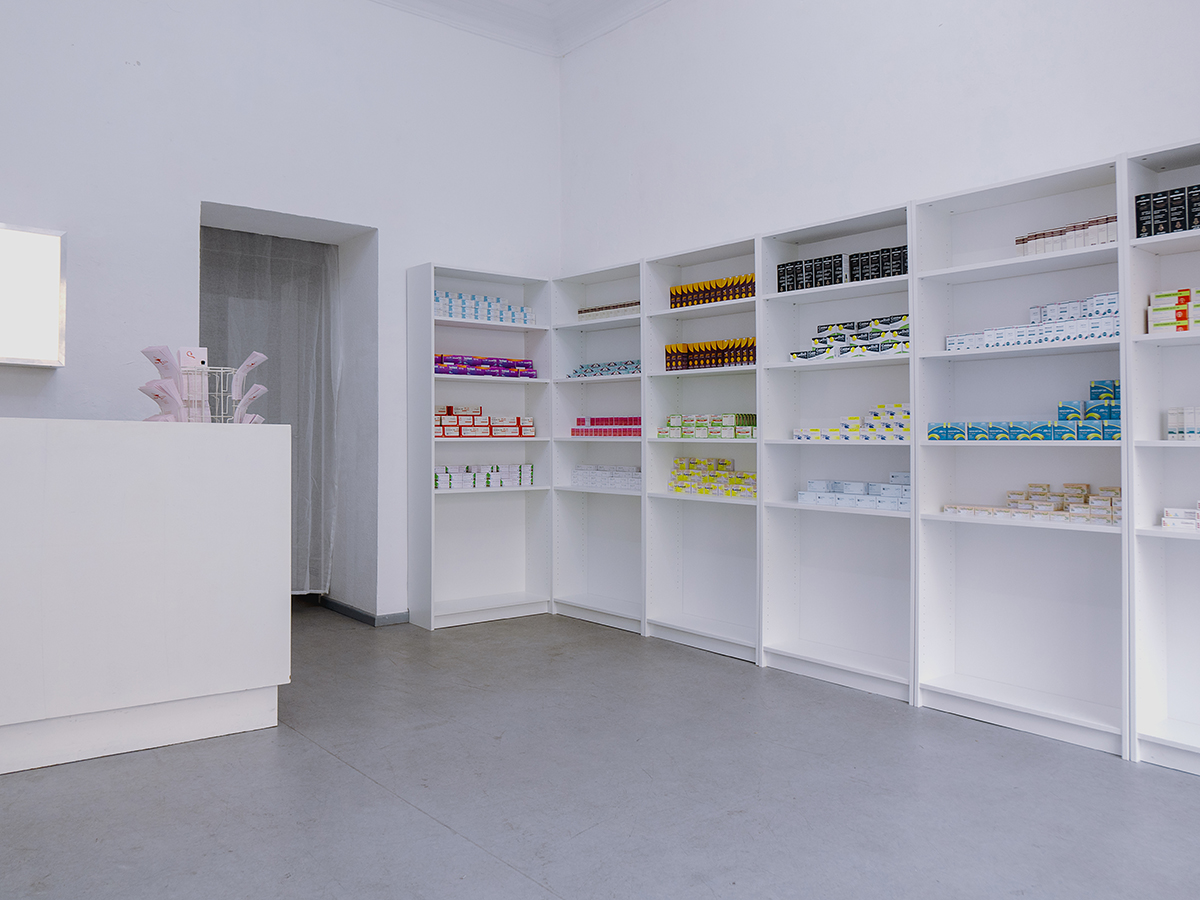
Darookhaneh Apotheke Pharmacy (2022), a project by Anahita Razmi and Sohrab Kashani in Berlin, Germany

Razmi's works have been exhibited at international institutions, such as the 55th Venice Biennale (2013), Venice; Halle 14 (2019), Leipzig; Zachęta National Gallery of Art (2016–2017), Warsaw; Museo Jumex, Mexico City; Kunstraum Innsbruck (2018), Innsbruck, Austria; Sazmanab Center for Contemporary Art, Tehran; Kunsthalle Baden-Baden, and Kunstmuseum Stuttgart (2013). During the Mahsa Amini protests, Razmi was one of a few artist to release protests posters.

Razmi received the Tarabya Cultural Academy fellowship, Istanbul (2020), the Goethe residency at LUX, London (2018), the Villa Kamogawa Residency, Kyoto (2015). She was awarded the Erich Hauser Art Foundation award (2015), the MAK–Schindler scholarship, Los Angeles (2013), and the Emdash award, Frieze Foundation, London (2011). In 2022, Razmi rejected an artist grant from the Stiftung Kunstfonds, criticizing the foundation's structural setup and the lack of diversity within its jury.

Her work is included in several public art collections, like the Bundeskunstsammlung in Germany; the Kunstmuseum Stuttgart, Stuttgart, Germany; the Museo del Novecento, Florence; and the Davis Museum at Wellesley College, Massachusetts, USA.

== Solo exhibitions ==
- Swing State (2013), travelled to Kunstverein Hannover, Hanover, Germany, and Stadtgalerie Saarbrücken (City Gallery Saarbrücken), Saarbrücken, Germany; her first solo exhibition
- Do Fard – Underwear Tehran Berlin (2015, 2016), travelled to Schwedenstr. 16, Berlin, Germany; and State of Concept Athens, Athens, Greece
- The Future State – a preliminary (2018), LUX London, London, England
- Anahita Razmi Spoilers (2018), Kunstraum Innsbruck, Innsbruck, Austria
- Darookhaneh Apotheke Pharmacy (2022), collaboration with Sohrab Kashani; traveling to Philomena in Berlin, Germany, and Uqbar in Vienna, Austria
- The Riff (2022), Carbon12 Gallery, Dubai, UAE

== See also ==
- List of Iranian women artists
