= Sauvage (film) =

2018 French drama film

- Film poster
- Directed by: Camille Vidal-Naquet
- Produced by: Emmanuel Giraud; Marie Sonne-Jensen
- Starring: Félix Maritaud; Eric Bernard; Nicolas Dibla; Philippe Ohrel
- Release date: 10 May 2018 (Cannes Film Festival)
- Running time: 99 minutes
- Country: France
- Language: French

Sauvage ('Wild') is a 2018 French drama film, directed by Camille Vidal-Naquet and produced by Emmanuel Giraud and Marie Sonne-Jensen. It stars Félix Maritaud in the lead role, with Éric Bernard, Nicolas Dibla and Philippe Ohrel. Sauvage premiered at the Cannes Film Festival in 2018, where it won the Rising Star Award and was nominated for 3 others.

== Premise ==
Léo (Félix Maritaud) is a male sex worker who uses drugs whilst longing for love.

== Cast ==
- Félix Maritaud as Léo
- Éric Bernard as Ahd
- Nicolas Dibla as Mihal
- Philippe Ohrel as Claude

== Themes and production ==
Sauvage was Vidal-Naquet's first feature film; his experience working with the Catholic charity Aux captifs la libération helped him to create the film. The film focuses on a young male sex worker, played by Félix Maritaud, with frequent explicit sex scenes; Vidal-Naquet "emphasizes [that] the sex we see in Sauvage is work". During pre-production, Vidal-Naquet and his director of photography Jacques Girault spent months planning out the camera work, performances and, particularly, the lighting and how it would work with other elements; he explained that he "wanted to film the sex scenes to be no different than the others" because "lighting is moral".

Vidal-Naquet describes that the theme of the film as being that Léo, the protagonist, is "untamed. He's a wild animal. When you think about it, the character of Léo reminds us that we live by rules of society, those set by modern cities. We’ve all been tamed." He quotes French film critic Jean Marc Lalanne's comments that "Léo behaves like a stray dog—he drinks water from the streets, he willingly sleeps in the streets, he eats garbage without disgust. For us, if we were really lost in a big city, and we didn’t have a dollar to buy water, it would be very difficult for us to imagine going to the gutter for a drink of water." David Gerstner, interviewing for Cineaste, observed that the film evoked a stray dog: "The basic instincts for survival not only require food and water, the stray dog also often gives affection when it receives affection."

Initially, Vidal-Naquet was reluctant to cast Maritaud, as he was looking for a younger, more "ill-looking" actor and "thought he would be too strong for this role". Once he met Maritaud, however, he saw that "the tenderness and fragility I wanted, he had them in the way he walks, the way he moves, the way he performs" and was convinced by the way the actor was talking about how to communicate emotions without dialogue, as Léo "doesn't talk much".

== Reception ==
=== Critical reception ===
On the review aggregator Rotten Tomatoes, the film holds an approval rating of 93% based on 57 reviews, and an average rating of 7.66. The website's critical consensus reads, "Sauvage / Wild takes a clear-eyed look at the life of a sex worker, fueled by Felix Maritaud's performance and writer-director Camille Vidal-Naquet's non-judgmental approach." Metacritic, which uses a weighted average, assigned the film a score of 77 out of 100, based on 10 critics, indicating "generally favorable reviews".

Peter Bradshaw of The Guardian wrote, "It’s a contrived and slightly unsatisfying image. But Maritaud’s performance has power." Tara Brady of The Irish Times wrote, "Félix Maritaud is a heartbreaking revelation as a sex worker seeking intimacy in France". David Rooney of The Hollywood Reporter wrote, "Sauvage has its longueurs, at times seeming stuck in a circuitous groove with too little forward momentum. However, the movie is never banal."

=== Accolades ===
Year	Award	Category	Result	Refs.
2018	Cannes Film Festival	Rising Star Award	Won	
2018	Cannes Film Festival	Critics' Week Grand Prize	Nominated	
2018	Cannes Film Festival	Golden Camera	Nominated	
2018	Cannes Film Festival	Queer Palm	Nominated	
2018	Chicago International Film Festival	Gold Q-Hugo	Nominated	
2018	Jerusalem Film Festival	International First Film	Won	
2019	César Award	Best First Film	Nominated	

== Bernard's claims ==
After his role in Sauvage, Bernard did not get other prominent roles in French cinema, which he accused of homophobic bias. In a 2023 interview with 20 minutes, Bernard spoke of the mistreatment in the national industry, echoing a plea from actress Muriel Robin, who had accused the French film industry of not letting gay and lesbian actors develop successful careers.

== See also ==
- Queer ecology
