= Olga Korotko =

Kazakh filmmaker

- Ольга Коротько
- Born: 19 January 1988; Oral
- Occupation: Film director

Olga Korotko (born January 19, 1988) is a Kazakh filmmaker based in Dubai.

Born in Oral, Kazakhstan, Korotko studied film at the Kazakh National Academy of Arts under Darezhan Omirbayev and later at the New York Film Academy.

Her first feature film, Tak sebe zima/Bad Bad Winter (2018), premiered at the Association for Independent Cinema and its Distribution (ACID) section of the 2018 Cannes Film Festival. It is a psychological thriller about the daughter of an Astana businessman who returns to her childhood home to sell her grandmother's house and becomes embroiled in the coverup of a murder. Her second feature film, Shegirtkeler, Vash Vyhod/Crickets, It's Your Turn (2024), was screened at the Locarno Film Festival.

== Filmography ==
- Vtoraya mama (2011)
- Golub na kryshe/Dove on the Roof (2012)
- Reverence (2013)
- Obyknovennyy chelovek/An Ordinary Person (2015)
- A Date (2015)
- Green Shoes (2016)
- Dom mamy/House of Mothers (2017)
- Tak sebe zima/Bad Bad Winter (2018)
- Shegirtkeler, Vash Vyhod/Crickets, It's Your Turn (2024)
