= Samouni Road =

- Film poster
- Italian: La strada dei Samouni
- Directed by: Stefano Savona
- Screenplay by: Stefano Savona; Léa Mysius; Penelope Bortoluzzi
- Produced by: Penelope Bortoluzzi; Marco Alessi; Cécile Lestrade
- Cinematography: Stefano Savona
- Edited by: Luc Forveille
- Music by: Giulia Tagliavia
- Production companies: Dugong Films; Picofilms; Alterego Productions; Rai Cinema; Arte France Cinéma
- Distributed by: Jour2fête
- Release date: 10 May 2018 (Cannes)
- Running time: 128 minutes
- Countries: Italy; France
- Language: Italian

Samouni Road (Italian: La strada dei Samouni) is a 2018 Italian documentary film directed by Stefano Savona. The film uses a combination of live action, scratchboard animation and drone footage recreations. It was selected to screen in the Directors' Fortnight section at the 2018 Cannes Film Festival and won the Œil d'or prize for best documentary.
