= The Enemy (2020 film) =

2020 Belgian true crime mystery film

- Theatrical film poster
- French: L'ennemi
- Directed by: Stephan Streker
- Written by: Stephan Streker
- Produced by: Michaël Goldberg; Boris Van Gils
- Starring: Jérémie Renier; Félix Maritaud; Alma Jodorowsky
- Cinematography: Léo Lefèvre
- Release dates: 29 August 2020 (Angoulême); 20 October 2020 (Ghent); 26 January 2022 (Belgium/France)
- Running time: 105 mins.
- Countries: Belgium; France; Luxembourg
- Languages: Flemish; French

The Enemy (French: L'ennemi) is a 2020 Belgian true crime mystery film directed and written by Stephan Streker. The film stars Jérémie Renier, Félix Maritaud, and Alma Jodorowsky. It premiered at the Angoulême Francophone Film Festival in 2020, before a theatrical release throughout Belgium and France in 2022.

== Synopsis ==
Prominent politician Louis Durieux is accused of having murdered his wife, found dead in their hotel room. The case blows up into an intense media storm. Is he guilty or innocent? Nobody knows. Perhaps not even him.

== Cast ==
- Jérémie Renier as Louis Durieux
- Félix Maritaud as Pablo Pasarela de la Peña
- Alma Jodorowsky as Maeva Durieux
- Zacharie Chasseriaud as Julien Durieux
- Emmanuelle Bercot as Maître Béatrice Rondas
- Peter Van Den Begin as Dirk
- Jeroen Perceval as Rudy
- Sam Louwyck as Translator
- Bruno Vanden Broecke as Judge

== Basis ==
Based on the real-life case of Walloon politician Bernard Wesphael.

== Reception ==
Claire Fulton of Loud and Clear Reviews rated the film 4/5 stars, and praised Stephan Streker: "The end result is a really clever, layered piece of filmmaking, symbolic of the idea that we judge others based on our judgements of ourselves, but also just really engaging as a piece of (almost) fiction." Aurore Engelen of Cineuropa lauded the acting: "In the role of Louis, Jérémie Renier is majestic, the unfathomable repository of everyone's doubts. He moves forward masked, in all senses of the word, reminding viewers of their own guilt in the field of moral judgement."

Meredith Taylor of Filmuforia gave it 2/5 stars and quipped: "More fascinating to watch than the film itself is Renier's hairstyle which looks like the turbo-charged tonsor of a medieval dauphin. Lacquered up to within an inch of its life to start with, it then takes on a different guise in every single scene, literally commanding your entire attention and getting it in lieu of a gripping plot-line." And Vpro Cinema awarded it 3/5 stars, opining: "Confusion predominates, while the story meanders and branches out to give the viewer a deliberately hazy glimpse into madness fueled by drink and drugs. Beautiful cinematography in and around Ostend."

== See also ==
- Uncovering the Wesphael Case
