= The Eyes of Orson Welles =

2018 documentary film

The Eyes of Orson Welles is a 2018 documentary film which explores the life and career of Orson Welles. It was directed by Mark Cousins.
