= Sohrab Kashani =

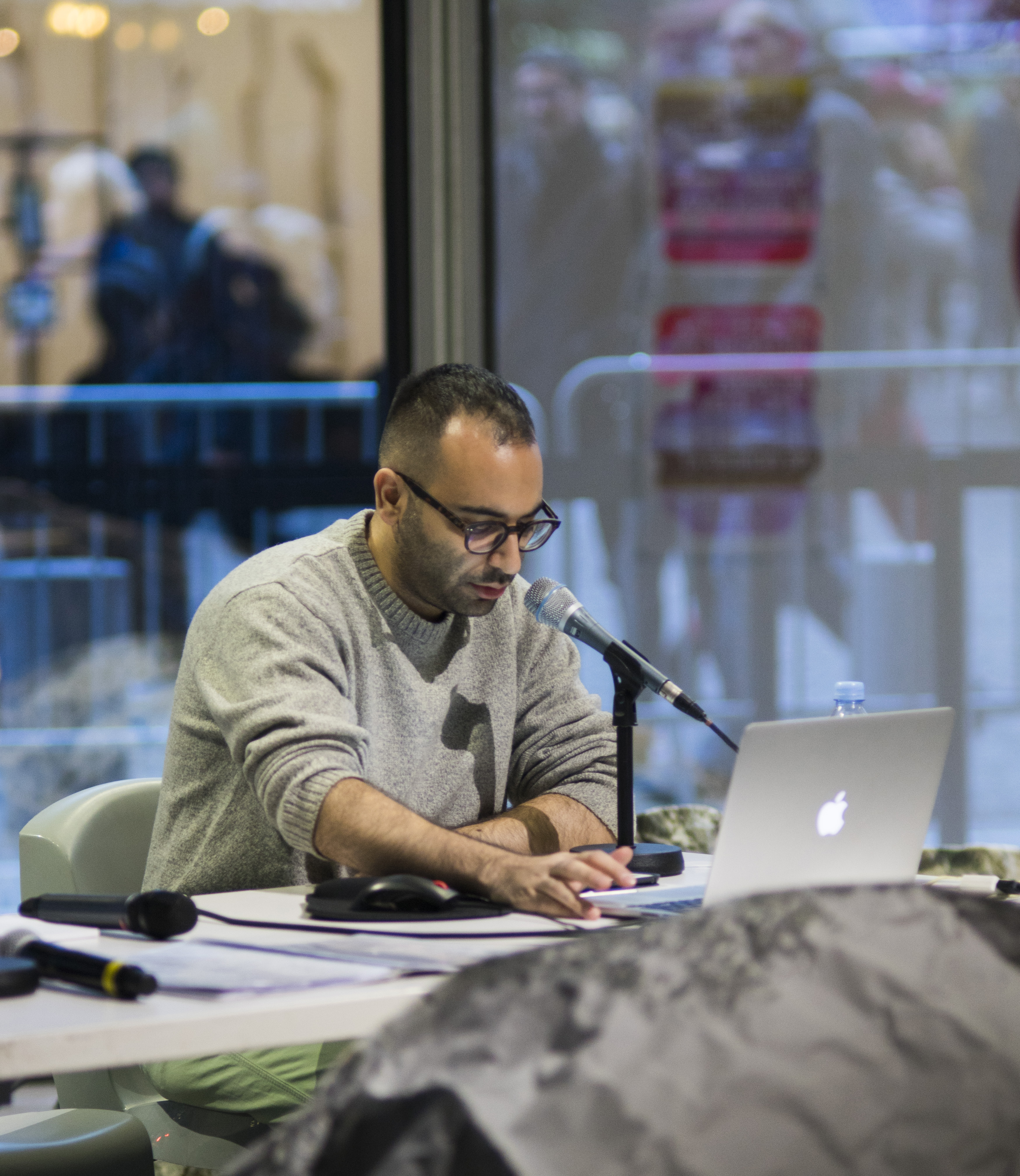
- Sohrab Kashani at Centre Pompidou in 2019
- Born: April 10, 1989 (age 36); Tehran, Iran
- Known for: Installation, Performance, Film, Video art, Image, Photography, Writing
- Notable work: The Other Apartment, Super Sohrab
- Website: sohrabmk.com

Sohrab Kashani (Persian: سهراب کاشانی) is an Iranian artist and contemporary art curator.

== Work as artist ==
=== Super Sohrab (2009–present) ===
Super Sohrab, Kashani’s alter-ego is a superhero who utilises satire and failure in their attempts to navigate the everyday challenges of daily life. Through the documentation of some of their own life events and their own failures, Super Sohrab addresses local and global socio-political problems. Super Sohrab's work often comprises performative interventions presented in photographs, videos, comics, text, and other formats. Super Sohrab also arm-wrestles in public to challenge and discuss power dynamics and sets up lifting workshops to practice resilience and resistance.

=== The Other Apartment (2019–present) ===
The Other Apartment is a collaborative project between Kashani and Pittsburgh-based artist Jon Rubin that initially occurred simultaneously in Kashani's apartment in Tehran and an exact replica of that apartment and all of its contents at the Mattress Factory museum in Pittsburgh, U.S. Using detailed photographs from Kashani (who was not able to travel to the U.S. due to the travel ban on Iranian citizens), the artists worked with a team of fabricators to meticulously recreate his Tehran apartment's facade, interior architecture, and all of his personal possessions. From his soap dish to his furniture, everything in The Other Apartment was purchased, altered, or entirely fabricated to replicate what existed in Kashani's apartment. Located within The Other Apartment, in both Tehran and Pittsburgh, was Sazmanab, Kashani's contemporary art space. Sazmanab produced programs where every object, video, and performance that happened in one space was meticulously duplicated for the other.

=== Darookhaneh Apotheke Pharmacy (2022/2024) ===
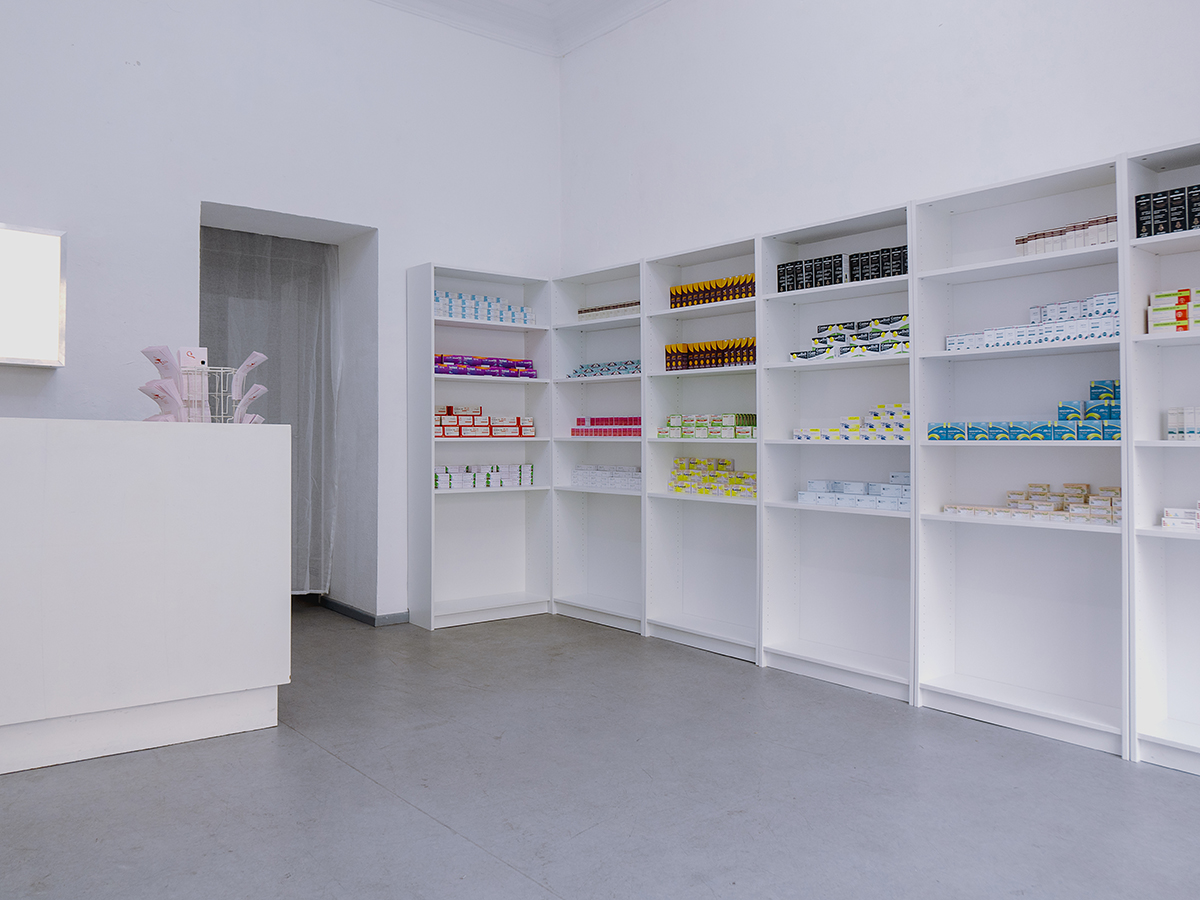
Darookhaneh Apotheke Pharmacy at uqbar projectspace (2022)

Darookhaneh Apotheke Pharmacy is a conversation space in the form of an Iranian pharmacy run by Kashani and German-born artist Anahita Razmi since 2022. Its spatial set-up comprises an installation filled with copies of Iranian pharmaceuticals and medication packages. Emerging in the aftermath of a global pandemic and a period of shared devastation, during which concerns about the unequal distribution of vaccines became pressing issues, Darookhaneh Apotheke Pharmacy makes a link to the Iranian concept of "darookhaneh" ("daroo" (medicine/cure) and "khaneh" (home) = "the home for cure"), testing out what it can enable for hybrid artistic work during crisis. Transcultural (dis)connections, trade infrastructures, legal obstacles, and inequalities in medicine distribution between the Global North and the Global South are some of the topics echoed in this space, which furthermore aims to look at what artistic strategies of appropriation and copying can do for rethinking and shifting (neo)colonial power dynamics. Bringing together selected speakers, collaborators, and the public, Darookhaneh Apotheke Pharmacy fosters discussions and conversations on these critical topics and their larger contexts.

== Work as curator ==
=== Sazmanab (2008–present) ===
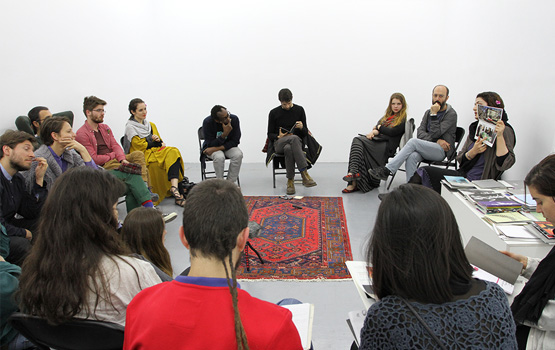
Cinétracts by Other Means at Sazmanab in 2015, a collaboration with Dutch Art Institute / Roaming Academy (Doreen Mende and The Otolith Group)

Sazmanab is a curatorial platform by Kashani which he originally started as an artist-run space and residency program in Tehran in 2008. From 2008 to 2014, Sazmanab was located in an apartment in the Sadeghiyeh district of Tehran and later in 2014 was relocated to an old building on Khaghani street near Darvaze Dolat in downtown Tehran. Since 2008, Sazmanab has set up more than hundred events and exhibitions at its venues and off-site. Sazmanab also holds talks and presentations at universities, museums, and institutions and takes part in international panels, seminars, and forums.

=== Exhibitions curated ===
- Sohrab Kashani and Joseph del Pesco, Voice-over (in three parts) Sazmanab (Tehran, Iran) and Mattress Factory Museum (Pittsburgh, PA, United States), 2019.
- Sohrab Kashani, Shattered Frames: Recent video work from Iran, Carnegie Museum of Art, Pittsburgh, PA, United States, 2016.
  This series of videos was later screened in Tehran, at the Pejman Foundation Kandovan site.
- Sohrab Kashani and Reza Aramesh, Centrefold Project: Spring of recession, Sazmanab, Tehran, Iran, 2015.
- Sohrab Kashani, Mapping Within: An Alternative Guide to Tehran, The Mine, Dubai, UAE, 2015.
- Sohrab Kashani, Lost & Found in Tehran: Contemporary Iranian Video, Columbus Museum of Art, Columbus, Ohio, United States, 2013.
- Sohrab Kashani, Subjective Truth from Iran, Center for Contemporary Art Tbilisi (CCA-T), Tbilisi, Georgia, 2013.
- Sohrab Kashani and Sandra Skurvida, Still Lives and Selected Acts, Dastan's Basement, Tehran, Iran, 2013.
- Sohrab Kashani and Sandra Skurvida, TVDinner Tehran, Sazmanab (Tehran, Iran) and Immigrant Movement International (New York, USA), 2011.
- Sohrab Kashani, The 1st Tehran Annual Digital Art Exhibition (TADAEX), Mohsen Gallery, Tehran, Iran, 2011.
- Sohrab Kashani and Jon Rubin, The Tehran/Pittsburgh YouTube Mix, The YouTube School for Social Politics, 2009.

== See also ==
- Modern and contemporary art in Iran
