= Centre d'étude des supports de publicité =

The Centre d'étude des supports de publicité (CESP) is a Paris-based non-profit association of media and communications services in France.

It is a French inter-professional body gathering the whole advertising market players concerned by studying audience of media: advertisers, agencies and media consulting houses, federation of ad purchasing space, medias and advertising sales houses. It is a center for documentation, information, training for professionals. Its missions are: conduct audit and labelize studies and researches on media and their audience. It brings its expertise both in France and internationally on works on media, on new tools and technics.

At the international level, it is a member of several bodies:

- Esomar: The World Association of Research Professionals.
- EBU: Union Européenne Radio-Télévision
- Emro: Association of European Media Research Organisations
- I-JIC (previously EURO-JICs): Association internationale des organismes de certification et d’études des supports de publicité
