= Camille Vidal-Naquet =

French director (born 1972)

Camille Vidal-Naquet (born 20 October 1972, Nevers) is a French director.

== Early life and education ==
Camille Vidal-Naquet came from an academic background; his parents and siblings are all teachers. He studied Literature, obtaining a master's degree and completing some work towards a PhD. His master's thesis was on literature and film, which he took into the PhD, wanting to write a thesis on Sam Raimi's The Evil Dead before trying to look at Ridley Scott's screenwriting in Alien and then quitting completely to make films. Queer culture scholar David A. Gerstner wrote in a film review that it is the director's academic background that acts as the "driving force for precision" in his work.

== Career ==
Vidal-Naquet's first feature film was 2018's Sauvage. His experience working with the Catholic charity Aux captifs la libération helped him to create the film. Sauvage premiered at the Cannes Film Festival in 2018, and became particularly popular with the LGBT+ community in New York City. The film focuses on a young male sex worker, played by Félix Maritaud, with frequent explicit sex scenes; Vidal-Naquet "emphasizes [that] the sex we see in Sauvage is work". During pre-production, Vidal-Naquet and his director of photography Jacques Girault spent months planning out the camera work, performances and, particularly, the lighting and how it would work with other elements; he explained that he "wanted to film the sex scenes to be no different than the others" because "lighting is moral".
