= Nazgol Ansarinia =

Iranian artist (born 1979)

- نازگل انصاری نیا
- Born: 1979 (age 46–47); Tehran, Pahlavi Iran (now Iran)
- Education: London College of Communication, California College of the Arts
- Occupation: Visual artist
- Known for: Mixed media sculpture, installation art

Nazgol Ansarinia (born 1979; Persian: نازگل انصاری نیا) is an Iranian interdisciplinary visual artist. She is known for her mixed media sculpture and installation art. She lives in Tehran.

== Biography ==
Ansarina was born in 1979 in Tehran, Pahlavi Iran (now Iran). She holds a B.A. degree in 2001 from the London College of Communication, and a M.F.A. degree in 2003 from the California College of the Arts in San Francisco, California.

In March 2009, she was awarded the Abraaj Capital Art Prize.

Her work is included in the collections of the Queensland Art Gallery, the Los Angeles County Museum of Art, the Tate Gallery and the British Museum.

== See also ==
- List of Iranian women artists
