= Slavs and Tatars =

Art collective

Slavs and Tatars is an art collective and "a faction of polemics and intimacies devoted to an area east of the former Berlin Wall and west of the Great Wall of China known as Eurasia". Founded in 2006 as a collaboration between artists and designers Payam Sharifi and Kasia Korczak, the group’s work is centered on three activities: exhibitions, books and lecture performances.

== History and work ==
Slavs and Tatars' exhibitions, books, printed matter and lecture-performances draw upon the stylistic palette of popular culture, spiritual and esoteric traditions, oral histories, modern myths, as well as scholarly research. Nicholas Cullinan in Artforum describes Slavs and Tatars as "the most cosmopolitan of collectives, where a geopolitics of globe-trotting allows their shape-shifting projects and concerns to continuously cross-pollinate divergent, and sometimes diametrically opposed, cultural specificities.”

The artists’ work can be organized according to cycles of research, each on a different theme or topic, from alphabet politics (Language Arts), to medieval advice literature (Mirrors for Princes) to an investigation of syncretism (Not Moscow Not Mecca).

H.G. Masters in Asia Art Pacific writes: "Beginning with the collective’s name, everything related to Slavs and Tatars is about building connections between seemingly disparate subjects—whether places, histories or ideologies." An important feature of their multi-disciplinary work is the resolution of antitheses or what the artists call the "metaphysical splits.” "The push and pull of competing ideologies (Sufism and communism), iconographies (sacred and profane) and functionalities (useful and useless) drawn from Eurasian traditions are condensed into polemical statements or objects, each one the conceptual equivalent of that hypothetical gymnast’s body.”

== Exhibitions ==
=== Solo exhibitions ===
Slavs and Tatars' most notable solo exhibitions include:

- Slavs and Tatars, Projects 98, Museum of Modern Art, NY, 2012
- Slavs and Tatars, Not Moscow Not Mecca, Vienna Secession, 2012
- Slavs and Tatars, Friendship of Nations: Polish Shi’ite Showbiz, REDCAT, Los Angeles
- Slavs and Tatars, Mirrors for Princes, Kunsthalle Zürich, 2014
- Slavs and Tatars, Concentrations 57, Dallas Museum of Art, 2014
- Slavs and Tatars, Mouth to Mouth, CCA Ujazdowski, 2017
- Slavs and Tatars, Nose to Nose, Argo Factory, 2017
- Slavs and Tatars, Made in Dschermany, Albertinum, Dresden, 2018

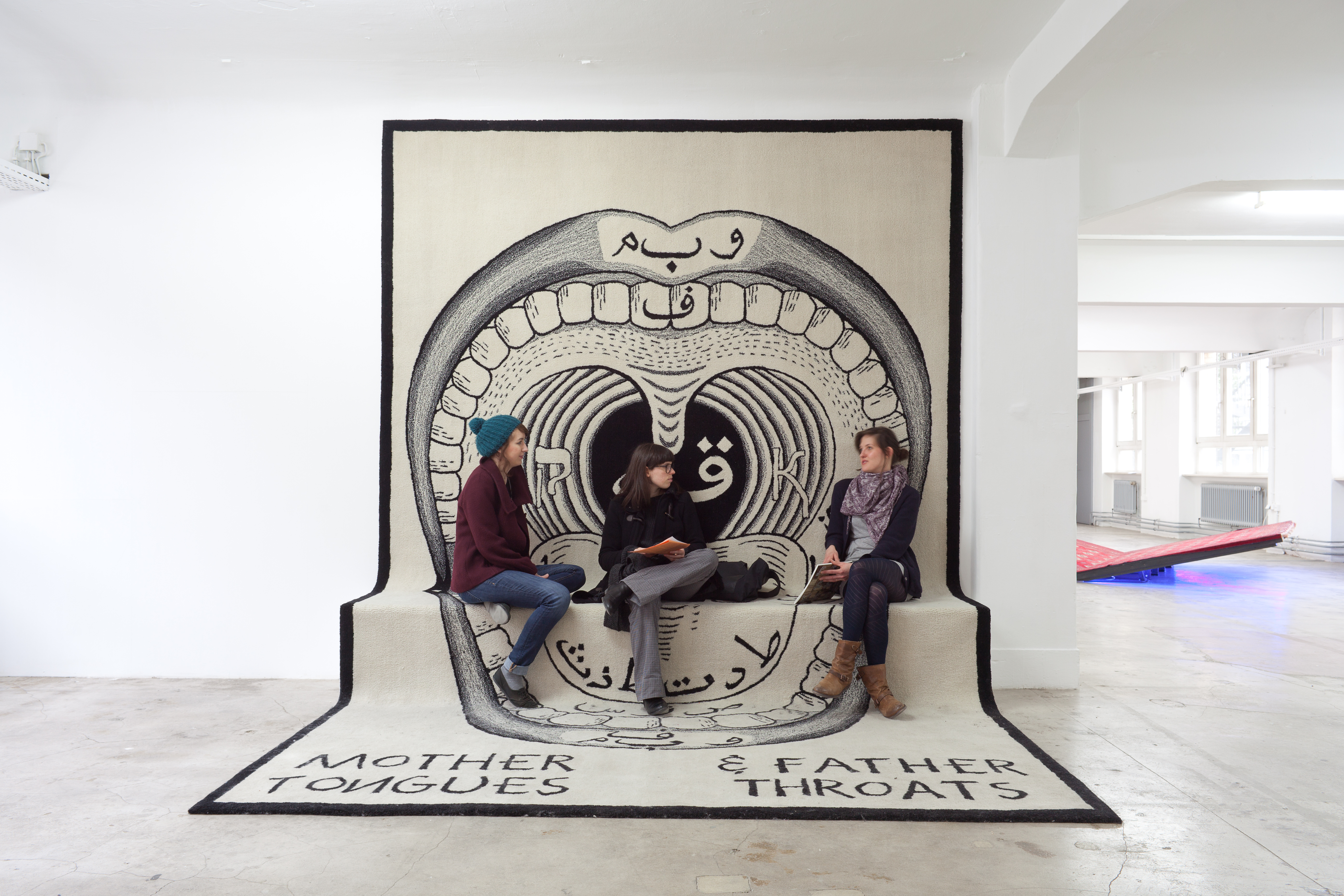
Slavs and Tatars, Mother Tongues and Father Throats, 2012. Installation view at Künstlerhaus, Stuttgart. Photo Bernard Kahrmann

=== Group exhibitions ===
Their work has been exhibited additionally at the Tate Modern, Centre Pompidou in Paris, Istanbul Modern, Artists Space, NY, 8th Berlin, 9th Gwangju, 1st Yinchuan and 10th Manifesta Biennales, among other institutions.

== Publications ==
The collective began as an informal reading group in 2006 and have since published 10 books with various publishers. These include:

- Friendship of Nations: Polish Shi’ite Showbiz on the unlikely points of convergence between Poland and Iran from the 17th to the 21st centuries (2nd edition, 2017, Book Works).
- Wripped Scripped (Hatje Cantz, 2018) on alphabet politics.
- Molla Nasreddin (2nd edition, 2017, I.B. Tauris)a translation of the legendary 20th century Azeri satirical weekly.
- Khhhhhhh: a look at sacred language via the phoneme [kh] in Hebrew, Cyrillic and Arabic scripts.

In 2017, the first monograph on their work was published by König Books, edited by Pablo Larios. Mid-career survey of Slavs and Tatars traveled between institutions within the artists’ geographic remit: Ujazdowski Castle Centre for Contemporary Art in Warsaw; Pejman Foundation, Tehran; SALT, Istanbul; CCA, Vilnius.

== Lectures ==
Slavs and Tatars lecture regularly at leading universities and museums including Yale University, University of Warsaw, Princeton University, UCLA, and NYU Abu Dhabi. Their roster of lecture-performances includes I Utter Other (2014–present) on Russian and Soviet Orientalism; 79.89.09 (2009–present) on the Iranian Revolution and Poland's Solidarność; Transliterative Tease (2013–present), on the march of alphabets accompanying empires; and Al-Isnad or Chains We Can Believe In on the role of faith in arts patronage via the works of Dan Flavin and a Dia Sufi mosque in New York City’s SoHo district.
