= 20 minutes (France) =

French daily newspaper

Coordinates: 48°53′53″N 2°16′44″E

- Type: Daily newspaper
- Publisher: Groupe Rossel, Ouest-France Group
- Founded: 2002; 23 years ago
- Language: French
- Country: France
- Circulation: 805,000 (Greater Paris)
- ISSN: 1632-1022 (print); 2270-6658 (web)
- Website: 20minutes.fr

20 minutes (French pronunciation: [vɛ̃ minyt] vingt minutes) is a free, daily newspaper aimed at commuters in France. It is published by Rossel and Ouest-France Group. 20 minutos, the Spanish version, is distributed by Schibsted and Zeta in Spain. In Switzerland, the French-language edition 20 minutes and the German-language edition 20 Minuten are published by Tamedia.

Rossel noted that the news outlet had 22.4 million monthly users while ratings firm Médiamétrie reported in 2017 that it received 16 million unique users per month. In Greater Paris, Ipsos and CESP confirmed a circulation of 805,000 with a readership of 2,339,000. 20 minutes claims that its readers are "young urban citizens (15–40 years old) that to a lesser extent consume traditional newspapers."

The French 20 minutes was launched in Paris on 15 March 2002, and spread to 11 other urban areas of France, including, in order of size, the cities of Marseille, Lyon, Toulouse, Nice, Nantes, Strasbourg, Montpellier, Bordeaux, Lille, Rennes and Grenoble. Each edition includes both national pages and regional sections.

Since its launch, 20 minutes has led the market of free French newspapers. In March 2014, due to the fall of advertising revenues (-6% en 2013), TF1 and Bolloré, owners of 20 minutes' competitors —Metronews and Direct Matin—, announced their willingness to buy 20 minutes and merge their activities.

Since 2016, it's co‑owned and published by Rossel and Ouest‑France, after Norwegian media group Schibsted sold its shares.

The final edition of the paper version was distributed on 5 July 2024. It marked the end of its print run. In January 2025, 20 Minutes got a new look, with a modern logo and clear visual styles for each section of the news. The editorial focus has shifted to include more practical content, as well as lifestyle and entertainment. It also features dedicated sections like "Vie Pro" and has plans to update its TV and social media video formats.

The shift to a fully digital format reflects changes in commuter behavior, with fewer people reading print during transit and more accessing news on mobile devices. With approximately 20 million monthly users, 20 Minutes is currently one of the most widely used online news platforms in France, particularly among younger, mobile-oriented audiences.

The name 20 minutes refers to the amount of time it should take one to read this daily newspaper.
