= How the World Sees America =

How the World Sees America is a video blog run by global correspondent Amar C. Bakshi and sponsored by The Washington Post and Newsweek Magazine. It features daily articles, which include text and short video clips, about citizens around the world impacted by the United States politically, economically and culturally.

== History ==
The project launched on May 15, 2007 in England, and wrapped up in Mexico in March 2008.

== Countries Covered ==
- How England Sees America
- How India Sees America
- How Pakistan Sees America
- How Turkey Sees America
- How Lebanon Sees America
- How Israel Sees America
- How The Philippines Sees America
- How South Korea Sees America
- How Venezuela Sees America
- How Mexico Sees America
