= Félix Maritaud =

French actor (born 1992)

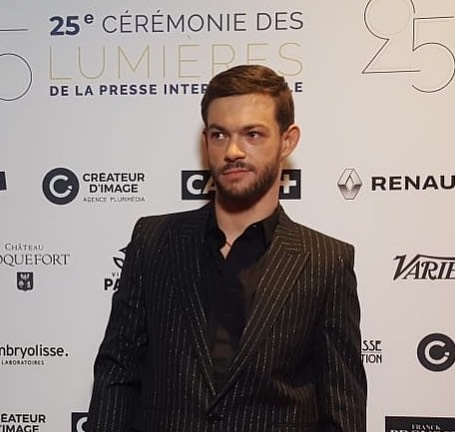
- Maritaud in January 2020
- Born: 12 December 1992 (age 33); Nevers, Nièvre, France
- Occupation: Actor
- Years active: 2017–present

Félix Maritaud (born 12 December 1992) is a French actor notable for his roles in French queer cinema.

== Career ==
Maritaud began to garner recognition after starring in a string of French independent films, most notably BPM (Beats per Minute). The French LGBT magazine Têtu dubbed him "the new hero of French queer cinema".

In 2018, Maritaud attracted further attention for his role in the independent film Sauvage, in which he played a homeless sex worker. Peter Bradshaw of The Guardian wrote that "Maritaud’s performance has power". Tara Brady of The Irish Times wrote, "Félix Maritaud is a heartbreaking revelation as a sex worker seeking intimacy in France". Dazed called his performance a "raw, delicate depiction". He won the Lumière Award for Best Male Revelation at the 24th Lumière Awards, for his performance in Sauvage. In 2019, Maritaud was featured in Gaspar Noé's Lux Æterna. It was screened out of competition at the 2019 Cannes Film Festival.

In 2020, Maritaud starred in a French short film titled Dustin, which was an official selection of the 2020 Cannes Film Festival, but was not able to be screened due to the cancellation of the festival in light of the COVID-19 pandemic in France. It was subsequently screened at the 2020 Toronto International Film Festival, where it was named the winner of the IMDbPro Short Cuts Award for Best International Short Film.

== Personal life ==
He is openly gay.

== Pledge ==
In September 2025, he signed an open pledge with Film Workers for Palestine pledging not to work with Israeli film institutions "that are implicated in genocide and apartheid against the Palestinian people."

== Filmography ==
Year	Title	Role	Director	Notes
2017	BPM (Beats per Minute)	Max	Robin Campillo	
2018	Sauvage	Leo	Camille Vidal-Naquet	Lumière Award for Best Male Revelation
2018	Knife+Heart	Thierry	Yann Gonzalez	
2018	Jonas	Jonas (as an adult)	Christophe Charrier	
2019	Lux Æterna	Félix	Gaspar Noé	
2020	La vita nuova	The Fauna	Colin Solal Cardo	Music video
2020	Dustin	Félix	Naïla Guiguet	Short film
2020	L'ennemi	Pablo Pasarela de la Peña Prieta y Aragon		
2022	You Won't Be Alone	Yovan	Goran Stolevski	
2022	Tom	Samy	Fabienne Berthaud	Post-production
2023	Solo	Olivier	Sophie Dupuis	
2024	Maldoror	Roberto	Fabrice du Welz	
