= Sazmanab =

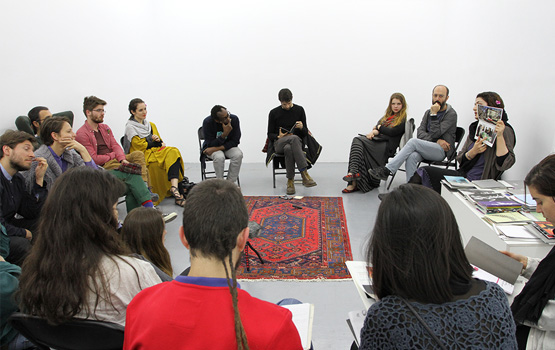
- Cinétracts by Other Means at Sazmanab in 2015
- Established: 2008
- Founder: Sohrab Kashani
- Website: www.sazmanab.org

Sazmanab (Persian: سازماناب) is a curatorial platform which originally started as an artist-run space and residency program in Tehran, Iran.

== History ==
=== Sazmanab Platform for Contemporary Arts ===
Sazmanab was founded in 2008 by artist and curator Sohrab Kashani. From 2008 to 2014, Sazmanab was located in an apartment in the north-west of Tehran, directly across the Tehran's Department of Water for the Sadeghiyeh district.

=== Sazmanab Center for Contemporary Art ===
In early 2014, Sazmanab began the relocation process to an old building on Khaghani Street near Darvaze Dolat in downtown Tehran. Sazmanab had its reopening and the launch of the new Ab-Anbar gallery (a gallery Kashani co-founded in the same building) in October 2014 with an exhibition by Iranian-born artist Babak Golkar. In 2016, Sazmanab held its last exhibition at its Khaghani Street venue; the Tehran retrospective of Harun Farocki.

Over the years, Sazmanab has held some of its programming off-site in collaboration with other art spaces and art venues.

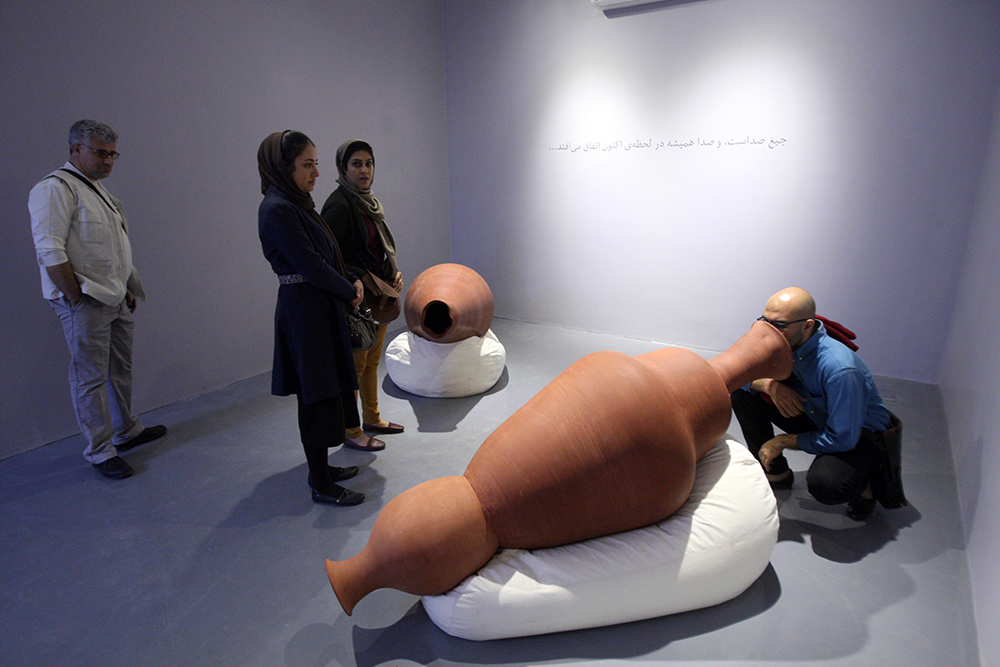
Of Labour, Of Dirt, exhibition by Babak Golkar in 2014

=== Sazmanab ⧚ Water Dept. ===
Sazmanab ⧚ Water Dept. was located simultaneously in Kashani's apartment in Nofel Loshato Street of Tehran and at the Mattress Factory Museum in Pittsburgh. As part of a collaboration, called The Other Apartment, between Kashani and Pittsburgh-based artist Jon Rubin, The Mattress Factory museum in Pittsburgh housed an exact replica of Kashani's apartment and all of its contents built meticulously by a team of fabricators in Pittsburgh. Located in both the US and Iran, Sazmanab ⧚ Water Dept. produced exhibitions, programs, and events where every object, video, and performance that happened in one space was meticulously duplicated for the other.
For the run of the project, Sazmanab was called Sazmanab ⧚ Water Dept. in a nod to the two versions of the same venue.

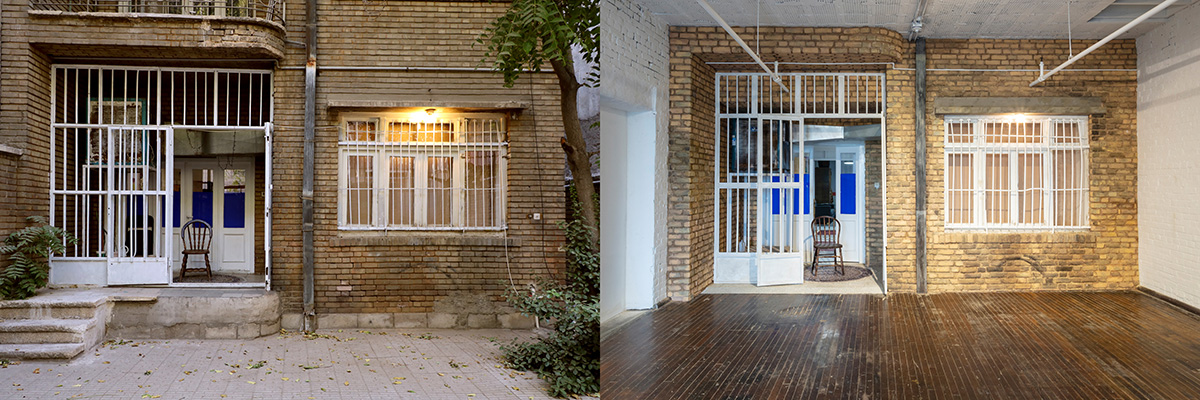
Sazmanab ⧚ Water Dept. in Kashani's apartment in Tehran and Mattress Factory Museum in Pittsburgh, Pennsylvania

== Exhibitions and Events ==
Since 2008, Sazmanab has set up more than a hundred events and exhibitions at its venues. Sazmanab also holds talks and presentations at universities, museums, and institutions and takes part in international panels, seminars, and forums.

== Residency Program ==
Shortly after Sazmanab's renovations in 2010, Sazmanab began its residency program. Sazmanab was the first open-call residency program in Tehran. While some residents were housed in the Sazmanab apartment, other residents were provided with living and working space in other locations in Tehran. Sazmanab hosted more than fifty artists and curators as part of its residency program.

== Library ==
Sazmanab's library held a variety of books, journals, and other publications related to the arts, cultural discourses, and social sciences. While there was an assortment of texts, there were specific sections dedicated to art history, monographs on artists, and exhibition catalogues featuring the work of artists from Iran and other parts of the world. The library also held publications produced by Sazmanab.

== Digital Archive ==
The Sazmanab Digital Archive included the documentation of all Sazmanab's projects and events, archived live-stream footage of Sazmanab during its events, episodes from "Sazmanab TV", and Sazmanab's video and film archive “Sazmanab Video Library”.

=== Sazmanab Video Library ===
Sazmanab Video Library (also known as: Lost in Teh(e)ran and Tehran Video Forum) was a database of Iranian video work and film formed by Sazmanab in 2011 and made public in 2012. Sazmanab Video Library was an innovative platform for artists working with video and film. The mission of Sazmanab Video Library was to collect and catalogue a large variety of different works that were made available for screenings and exhibitions. The database was a resource for artists, educational institutions, museums, galleries, and cultural centres.

=== Sazmanab TV ===
Sazmanab TV was launched in 2011. Sazmanab TV featured exhibitions at Sazmanab and other art spaces and galleries in Tehran, visited artist studios, and made interviews with artists in Tehran part of its program.
