= Cabourg Film Festival =

Annual film festival in Cabourg, France

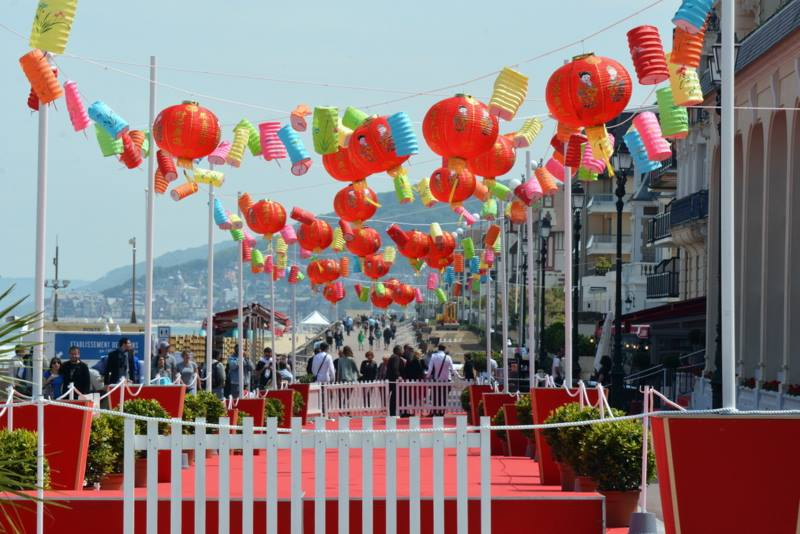
- Location: Cabourg, France
- Founded: 1983
- Language: International
- Website: festival-cabourg.com

The Cabourg Film Festival takes place on the seaside of Normandy every year in June. With romance as its theme, the festival presents a selection of films dedicated to passion, love, and fantasies.

The festival was founded by Gonzague Saint Bris in 1983, and its director is Suzel Pietri. Today, the festival reaches several towns on the Côte Fleurie between Cabourg, Houlgate and Dives-sur-Mer. At nightfall, the festival also offers several open air screenings on the beach of Cabourg.

Both the Grand Jury, consisting of professionals from the film and cultural industries, and the Youth Jury awards prizes to the best feature films. In addition to the official competition, the Panorama section allows the public to preview a selection of French and foreign films, which are all eligible for the Audience Award.

The short film competition includes a selection of romantic French shorts that another jury will reward with the following prizes: best short film, best actress, and best actor.

During the closing ceremony, the Festival's Golden Swann Committee, composed of journalists, and film professionals, attributes the following Golden Swanns: the best romantic actress and actor, male and female breakthrough performances, the best director, and the best romantic film of the past year.

The name of the award is a reference to the novel Du côté de chez Swann by Marcel Proust.

The trophy is made by one of the festival's partners, the Monnaie de Paris workshops. The statuette is fashioned in the form of two swans in an embrace to suggest the shape of two hearts.

The Premiers Rendez-Vous section highlights a young French actor and actress in their first appearance on screen. Additionally, since 2018, the Gonzague Saint Bris Prize distinguishes each year the best film adaptation of a literary work.

During the festival, some of the most renowned names in French, European, and international cinema come to present their films to the public or to receive an award: Isabelle Adjani, Swann Arlaud, Jacques Audiard, Emmanuelle Béart, Leïla Bekhti, Juliette Binoche, Sandrine Bonnaire, Lucas Bravo, Patrick Bruel, Guillaume Canet, François Civil, Marion Cotillard, Camille Cottin, Béatrice Dalle, Catherine Deneuve, Émilie Dequenne, Anne Dorval, Léa Drucker, Gad Elmaleh, Guillaume Gallienne, Gustave Kervern, Vincent Lacoste, Sophie Marceau, Noémie Merlant, Pierre Niney, Vanessa Paradis, Léa Seydoux, Céline Sciamma, Audrey Tautou, Zhang Ziyi, Rebecca Zlotowski.

== Awards ==
=== Competition ===
- Feature film
  - Grand Prix
- Short film
  - Best Short Film
  - Best Director
  - Best Actress
  - Best Actor

=== Panorama ===
- Audience Award (Prix du Public)

=== Premiers Rendez-vous ===
- Prix Premier Rendez-Vous

=== Jeunesse ===
- Youth Jury Prize (Prix de la Jeunesse)

=== Ciné Swann ===
- Best Feature Film (Swann d'Or du meilleur long-métrage)
- Best Director (Swann d'Or du meilleur réalisateur de long-métrage)
- Best Actress (Swann d'Or de la meilleure actrice)
- Best Actor (Swann d'Or du meilleur acteur)
- Female Revelation (Swann d'Or de la Révélation féminine)
- Male Revelation (Swann d'Or de la Révélation masculine)
- Coup de Cœur

== 2000 edition ==
=== Feature film ===
Jury President: Raúl Ruiz

=== Swann d'Or ===
- Best Feature Film: Fidelity (La Fidélité)
- Best Actress: Sophie Marceau – Fidelity (La Fidélité)
- Best Actor: Jean-Pierre Bacri – The Taste of Others (Le Goût des Autres)
- Female Revelation: Marion Cotillard – Blue Away to America (Du Bleu jusqu'en Amérique)
- Male Revelation: Sami Bouajila – The Adventures of Felix (Drôle de Félix)
- Coup de Foudre: Bernard Giraudeau

=== Short film ===
- Best Short Film: Les Aveugles
- Best Actress: Nathalie Villeneuve – Carpe Diem
- Best Actor: Gilberto Azevedo – Des morceaux de ma femme

== 2001 edition ==
=== Feature film ===
Jury President: Claude Pinoteau

- Grand Prix: Malèna directed by Giuseppe Tornatore
  - Special mention: Why Get Married the Day the World Ends? (Pourquoi se marier le jour de la fin du Monde ?) directed by Harry Cleven

=== Swann d'Or ===
- Best Director: Jean-Pierre Jeunet – Amélie (Le Fabuleux destin d'Amélie Poulain)
- Best Actress: Sandrine Bonnaire – Mademoiselle
- Best Actor: Mathieu Kassovitz – Amélie (Le Fabuleux destin d'Amélie Poulain)
- Female Revelation: Émilie Dequenne – Brotherhood of the Wolf (Le Pacte des Loups)
- Male Revelation: Éric Caravaca – Sans plomb
- Coup de Cœur: Arielle Dombasle
- Coup de Foudre: Richard Berry

=== Short film ===
- Best Short Film: Jean-Fares
- Best Actress: Alice Carel – On s'embrasse ?
- Best Actor: Jean-Luc Abel – On s'embrasse ?

== 2002 edition ==
=== Feature film ===
Jury: Nina Companéez (President), Évelyne Bouix, Marie Nimier

- Grand Prix: Riding in Cars with Boys directed by Penny Marshall
  - Special mention: Irène directed by Yvan Calberac

=== Swann d'Or ===
- Best Director: Yvan Attal – My Wife Is an Actress (Ma femme est une actrice)
- Best Actress: Mathilde Seigner – The Girl from Paris (Une hirondelle a fait le printemps)
- Best Actor: Sergi López – Women or Children First (Les Femmes... ou les enfants d'abord...)
- Female Revelation: Mélanie Doutey – The Warrior's Brother (Le Frère du guerrier)
- Male Revelation: Bernard Campan – Beautiful Memories (Se souvenir des belles choses)
- Coup de Cœur: Mylène Demongeot

=== Short film ===
- Best Short Film: J'attendrai le suivant
- Best Actress: Dinara Droukarova – Pensée assise
- Best Actor: Thomas Gaudin – J'attendrai le suivant

== 2003 edition ==
=== Feature film ===
Jury: Antoine de Caunes (President), Sacha Bourdo, Bruno Chiche, Vincent Delerm, Marie Gillain, Vincent Lannoo, Stanislas Merhar

- Grand Prix: Life Kills Me (Vivre me tue) directed by Jean-Pierre Sinapi

=== Swann d'Or ===
- Best Director: Jean-Paul Rappeneau – Bon Voyage
- Best Actress: Isabelle Adjani – Adolphe
- Best Actor: Bernard Giraudeau – That Day (Ce Jour-Là)
- Female Revelation: Morgane Moré – Once Upon an Angel (Peau d'Ange)
- Male Revelation: Jalil Lespert – Life Kills Me (Vivre me tue)
- Coup de Cœur: Isabelle Adjani

=== Short film ===
- Best Short Film: L'Escalier
- Best Actress: Nina Meurisse – L'Escalier
- Best Actor: Moussa Maaskri – Quand le vent tisse les fleurs

== 2004 edition ==
=== Feature film ===
- Grand Prix: The Consequences of Love directed by Paolo Sorrentino

=== Swann d'Or ===
- Best Director: Abdellatif Kechiche – Games of Love and Chance (L'Esquive)
- Best Actress: Karin Viard – France Boutique
- Best Actor: Patrick Bruel – Une vie à t'attendre
- Female Revelation: Sara Forestier – Games of Love and Chance (L'Esquive)
- Male Revelation: Nicolas Duvauche – Eager Bodies (Les Corps impatients)
- Coup de Cœur: Josiane Balasko

=== Short film ===
- Best Short Film: Cousines
- Best Actress: Marie-Laure Descoureaux – Hymne à la gazelle
- Best Actor: Adrien de Van – Trois jeunes tambours

== 2005 edition ==
=== Feature film ===
- Grand Prix: My Summer of Love directed by Paweł Pawlikowski

=== Swann d'Or ===
- Best Director: Arnaud Desplechin – Kings and Queen (Rois et Reine)
- Best Actress: Valeria Bruni Tedeschi – 5x2 & Crustacés et Coquillages
- Best Actor: Vincent Lindon – The Moustache
- Female Revelation: Lola Naymark – A Common Thread (Brodeuses)
- Male Revelation: Nicolas Cazalé – Le Grand Voyage
- Coup de Cœur: Charlotte Rampling

=== Short film ===
- Best Short Film: Pépins Noirs
- Best Actress: Thérèse Roussel – Le Temps des cerises
- Best Actor: Fred Epaud – Libre échange
- Prix Cinecourts: After Shave directed by Hany Tamba

=== Jeunesse ===
- Youth Jury Prize: My Summer of Love directed by Paweł Pawlikowski

== 2006 edition ==
=== Feature film ===
Jury: Xavier Beauvois, Soledad Bravi, Catherine Jacob, Julie Lopes-Curval, Caterina Murino, Brigitte Roüan, Pascale Roze

- Grand Prix: Lower City directed by Sérgio Machado
  - Special mention: Quinceañera directed by Richard Glatzer and Wash Westmoreland

=== Swann d'Or ===
- Best Director: Michele Placido – Romanzo Criminale (Rois et Reine)
- Best Actress: Cécile de France – Avenue Montaigne (Fauteuils d'orchestre)
- Best Actor: Michel Blanc – You Are So Beautiful (Je vous trouve très beau)
- Female Revelation: Anna Mouglalis – Romanzo Criminale
- Male Revelation: Lorànt Deutsch – Les Amants du Flore

=== Short film ===
- Best Director: Maryline Canto – Fais de beaux rêves
- Best Actress: Thérèse Roussel – Béa
- Best Actor: Aymeric Cormerais – Béa
- Special mention: Des putes dans les arbres
- Prix Cinecourts: La Petite Flamme directed by Elizabeth Marre and Olivier Pont

=== Jeunesse ===
- Youth Jury Prize: Lower City directed by Sérgio Machado
  - Special mention: The Yacoubian Building directed by Marwan Hamed

== 2007 edition ==
=== Feature film ===
Jury: Andrzej Żuławski (President), Anne Consigny, Agnès de Sacy, Yves Marmion, Roxane Mesquida, Sagamore Stévenin, Colo Tavernier O'Hagan

- Grand Prix: Franz + Polina directed by Mikhail Segal

=== Swann d'Or ===
- Best Director: Christophe Honoré – Love Songs (Les Chansons d'amour)
- Best Actress: Marion Cotillard – La Vie en Rose (La Môme)
- Best Actor: Guillaume Canet – Hunting and Gathering (Ensemble, c'est tout)
- Female Revelation: Clémence Poésy – Le Grand Meaulnes
- Male Revelation: Fu'ad Aït Aattou – The Last Mistress (Une vieille maîtresse)

=== Short film ===
- Best Director: Alice Winocour – Magic Paris
- Best Actress: Johanna ter Steege – Magic Paris
- Best Actor: Jonathan Zaccaï – De l'Amour

=== Jeunesse ===
- Youth Jury Prize: Water Lilies (Naissance des Pieuvres) directed by Céline Sciamma

== 2008 edition ==
=== Feature film ===
Jury: Jean-Pierre Denis (President), Lolita Chammah, Emmanuelle Cosso-Mérad, Hafsia Herzi, Maïwenn, Anne Le Ny, Jean-François Lepetit, Claire Nebout, Clément Sibony, Erick Zonca

- Grand Prix: Alice's House (A Casa de Alice) directed by Chico Teixeira

=== Swann d'Or ===
- Best Director: Emmanuel Mouret – Shall We Kiss? (Un baiser s'il vous plaît)
- Best Actress: Laetitia Casta – Born in 68 (Nés en 68)
- Best Actor: Patrick Bruel – A Secret (Un secret)
- Female Revelation: Anne Marivin – Welcome to the Sticks (Bienvenue chez les Ch'tis)
- Male Revelation: Yannick Renier – Born in 68 (Nés en 68)

=== Short film ===
- Best Director: Samuel Tilman – Voix de garage
- Best Actress: Julie Gayet – S'éloigner du rivage
- Best Actor: Dominique Wittorski – 6ème Ciel

=== Jeunesse ===
- Youth Jury Prize: Cherry Blossoms directed by Doris Dörrie

== 2009 edition ==
=== Feature film ===
Jury: Sam Karmann (President), Marie-Anne Chazel, Mélanie Doutey, Julie Gayet, François Kraus, Vahina Giocante, Jacques Fieschi, Jérôme Bonnell, Nicolas Giraud

- Grand Prix (ex-æquo):
  - Somers Town directed by Shane Meadows
  - Sometime in August directed by Sebastian Schipper

=== Swann d'Or ===
- Best Director: Stephen Frears – Chéri
- Best Actress: Émilie Dequenne – The Girl on the Train (La Fille du RER)
- Best Actor: Benoît Poelvoorde – Coco Before Chanel (Coco avant Chanel)
- Female Revelation: Anaïs Demoustier – Les Grandes Personnes
- Male Revelation: Jérémy Kapone – LOL (Laughing Out Loud)

=== Short film ===
Jury: Robin Renucci (President), Jeanne Cherhal, Cécile Cassel, Bouraouia Marzouk, Francois Vincentelli, Nicolas Rollinger

- Best Director: Rúnar Rúnarsson – Two Birds
- Best Actress: Camille Claris – En Douce
- Best Actor: Nazmi Kirik – Sidewalk

=== Jeunesse ===
- Youth Jury Prize: Somers Town directed by Shane Meadows

=== Panorama ===
- Audience Award: Tengri: Blue Heavens directed by Marie-Jaoul de Poncheville

=== Premiers Rendez-vous ===
- Prix Premiers Rendez-vous:
  - Firat Ayverdi – Welcome
  - Àstrid Bergès-Frisbey – The Sea Wall (Un Barrage contre le Pacifique)

== 2010 edition ==
=== Feature film ===
- Grand Prix (ex-æquo):
  - Air Doll directed by Hirokazu Koreeda
  - Come Undone (Cosa voglio di più) directed by Silvio Soldini

=== Swann d'Or ===
- Best Romantic Comedy: Heartbreaker (L'Arnacœur)
- Best Director: Julie Delpy – The Countess (La Comtesse)
- Best Actress: Marina Hands – Ensemble, nous allons vivre une très très grande histoire d'amour
- Best Actor: Éric Elmosnino – Gainsbourg: A Heroic Life (Gainsbourg (Vie héroïque))
- Female Revelation: Leïla Bekhti – Tout ce qui brille
- Male Revelation: Vincent Rottiers – Silent Voice (Qu'un seul tienne et les autres suivront)
- Coup de Cœur:
  - Christophe Lambert – Trivial (La Disparue de Deauville), Cartagena (L'Homme de chevet) and White Material
- Coup de Foudre: Mammuth directed by Gustave Kervern and Benoît Delépine

=== Short film ===
- Best Director: Amal Kateb – On ne mourra pas
  - Special mention: Vincent Vizioz – Tremblay-en-France
- Best Actress: Yelle – Une pute et un poussin
- Best Actor: Joseph Malerba – Le Cygne

=== Jeunesse ===
- Youth Jury Prize: Me Too (Yo, también) directed by Antonio Naharro and Álvaro Pastor

=== Panorama ===
- Audience Award: The Names of Love (Le Nom des gens) directed by Michel Leclerc

=== Premiers Rendez-vous ===
- Prix Premiers Rendez-vous:
  - Alice de Lencquesaing – Father of My Children (Le Père de mes enfants)
  - Mehdi Dehbi – He Is My Girl (La Folle Histoire d'amour de Simon Eskenazy )

== 2011 edition ==
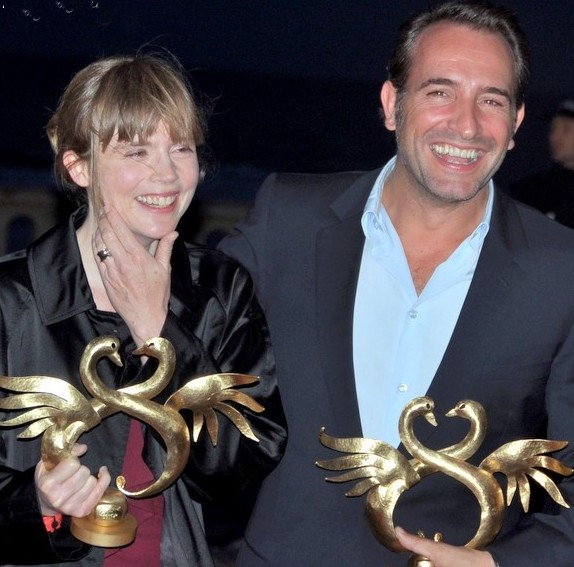
French actors Isabelle Carré and Jean Dujardin at the 2011 edition

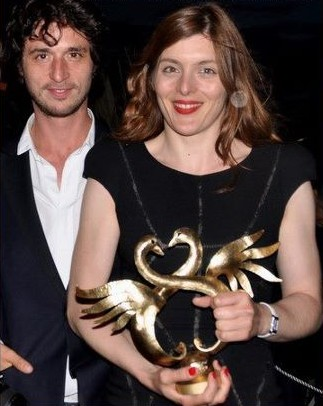
French actors Jérémie Elkaïm and Valérie Donzelli at the 2011 edition

=== Feature film ===
Jury: Radu Mihăileanu (President), Àstrid Bergès-Frisbey, Audrey Dana, Virginie Despentes, Emmanuel Mouret, Tomer Sisley, Saïd Taghmaoui

- Grand Prix: Declaration of War (La Guerre est déclarée) directed by Valérie Donzelli
  - Special mention: Happy, Happy directed by Anne Sewitsky

=== Swann d'Or ===
- Best Romantic Film: Les Yeux de sa mère directed by Thierry Klifa
- Best Director: Patrice Leconte – Voir la mer
- Best Actress: Isabelle Carré – Romantics Anonymous (Les Émotifs anonymes)
- Best Actor: Jean Dujardin – A View of Love (Un balcon sur la mer)
- Female Revelation: Pauline Lefèvre – Voir la mer
- Male Revelation: Raphaël Personnaz – The Princess of Montpensier (La Princesse de Montpensier )
- Coup de Cœur: Sylvie Vartan
- Coup de Foudre: Si tu meurs, je te tue directed by Huner Saleem

=== Short film ===
Jury: Gustave Kervern (President), Déborah François, Isabelle Frilley, Michèle Simmonet, Vénus Khoury-Ghata, Heremoana Maamaatuaiahutapu

- Best Short Film: J'aurais pu être une pute directed by Baya Kasmi
  - Special mention: Prochainement sur vos écrans directed by Fabrice Maruca
- Best Actress: Vimala Pons – J'aurais pu être une pute
- Best Actor: Franc Bruneau – Cheveu

=== Jeunesse ===
- Youth Jury Prize: Barney's Version directed by Richard J. Lewis

=== Panorama ===
- Audience Award: Where Do We Go Now? (Et maintenant, on va où ?) directed by Nadine Labaki

=== Premiers Rendez-vous ===
- Prix Premiers Rendez-vous:
  - Ana Girardot – Lights Out (Simon Werner a disparu...)
  - Jérémie Duvall – Jo's Boy (Le Fils à Jo) & Mon père est femme de ménage

== 2012 edition ==
=== Feature film ===
Jury: Yann Samuell (President), Bertrand Burgalat, Pierre Aïm, Thomas Anargyros, Amira Casar, Mathieu Demy, Marie Denarnaud, Anne Marivin, Christa Theret

- Grand Prix: Laurence Anyways directed by Xavier Dolan

=== Swann d'Or ===
- Best Film: Rust and Bone (De rouille et d'os) directed by Jacques Audiard
- Best Director: Robert Guédiguian – The Snows of Kilimanjaro (Les Neiges du Kilimandjaro)
- Best Actress: Léa Seydoux – Farewell, My Queen (Les Adieux à la reine) & Sister (L'Enfant d'en haut)
- Best Actor: Jérémie Rénier – My Way (Cloclo)
- Best Composer: Alex Beaupain
- Female Revelation: Soko – Bye Bye Blondie
- Male Revelation: Pierre Niney – 18 Years Old and Rising (J'aime regarder les filles
- Coup de Cœur: Corinne Masiero – Louise Wimmer
- Swann d'honneur: Vanessa Paradis

=== Short film ===
Jury: Pascal Greggory (President), Anne Azoulay, Natacha Régnier, Niels Schneider, Sarah Stern

- Best Short Film: Les Navets blancs empêchent de dormir directed by Rachel Lang
- Best Actress: Sophia Leboutte – A New Old Story
- Best Actor: Sébastien Houbani – La Tête froide

=== Jeunesse ===
- Youth Jury Prize: Laurence Anyways directed by Xavier Dolan

=== Panorama ===
- Audience Award: My Lucky Star (Ma bonne étoile) directed by Anne Fassio

=== Premiers Rendez-vous ===
- Prix Premiers Rendez-vous:
  - Abraham Belaga – A Bottle in the Gaza Sea (Une bouteille à la mer)
  - Fleur Lise – My Lucky Star (Ma bonne étoile)

== 2013 edition ==
=== Feature film ===
- Grand Prix: Grand Central directed by Rebecca Zlotowski

=== Swann d'Or ===
- Best Film: Just a Sigh (Le Temps de l'aventure) directed by Jérôme Bonnell
- Best Actress: Emmanuelle Devos – Just a Sigh (Le Temps de l'aventure)
- Best Actor: Pierre Niney – It Boy (20 ans d'écart)
- Female Revelation: Lola Créton – Something in the Air (Après mai)
- Male Revelation: Félix Moati – Télé gaucho
- Coup de Cœur: Catherine Deneuve – On My Way (Elle s'en va)

=== Short film ===
- Best Short Film: On the Beach directed by Marie-Elsa Sgualdo
- Best Actress: Joanne Nussbaum – On the Beach
- Best Actor: Olivier Duval – L'Amour bègue

=== Jeunesse ===
- Youth Jury Prize: My Sweet Pepper Land directed by Huner Saleem

=== Panorama ===
- Audience Award: Queens of the Ring (Les Reines du ring) directed by Jean-Marc Rudnicki

=== Premiers Rendez-vous ===
- Prix Premiers Rendez-vous:
  - Victoire Belezy – Fanny
  - François Civi – Macadam Baby

== 2014 edition ==
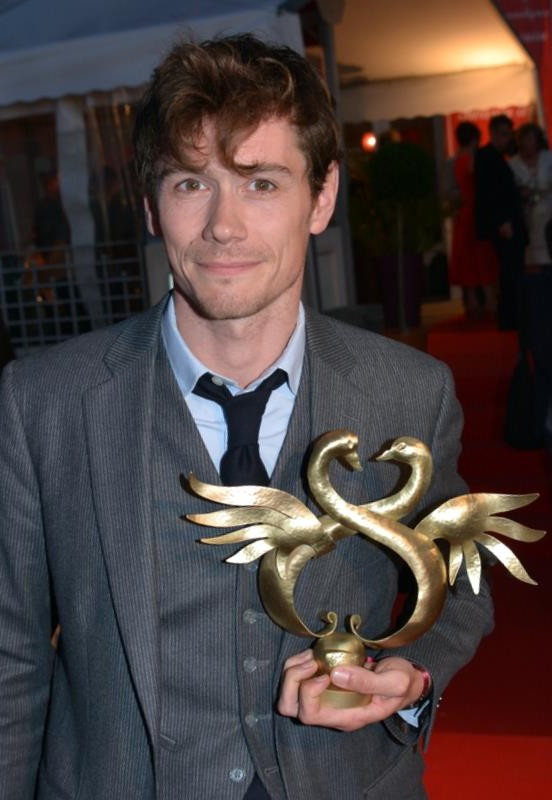
French actor Loïc Corbery at the 2014 edition.

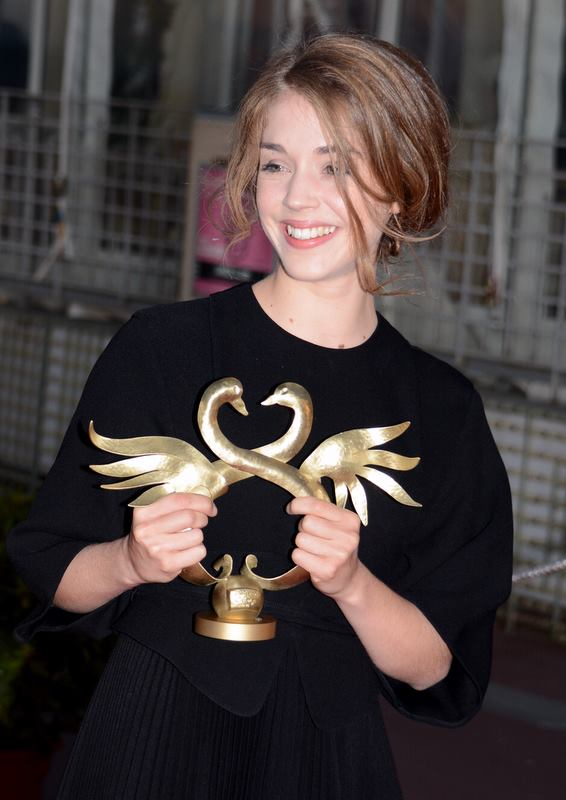
French actress Alice Isaaz at the 2014 edition.

=== Feature film ===
Jury: Catherine Corsini (co-president), Martin Provost (co-president), Pauline Étienne, Gilles Henry, Jean-Louis Martinelli, Gilbert Melki, Natacha Régnier, Laura Smet, Anne-Dominique Toussaint

- Grand Prix (ex-æquo):
  - Party Girl directed by Marie Amachoukeli, Claire Burger, Samuel Theis
  - Matterhorn directed by Diederik Ebbinge

=== Swann d'Or ===
- Best Film: Not My Type (Pas son genre) directed by Lucas Belvaux
- Best Director: Pierre Salvadori – In the Courtyard (Dans la cour)
- Best Actress: Émilie Dequenne – Not My Type (Pas son genre)
- Best Actor: Loïc Corbery – Not My Type (Pas son genre)
- Female Revelation: Alice Isaaz – Les Yeux jaunes des crocodiles
- Male Revelation: Pierre Rochefort – Going Away (Un beau dimanche)
- Coup de Cœur: Zhang Ziyi

=== Short film ===
Jury: Guillaume Nicloux (President), Victoire Bélézy, Pascal Bourdiaux, Florence Loiret Caille, China Moses, Stéphanie Murat, Julien Poupard

- Best Short Film: Bruine directed by Dénes Nagy
- Best Cinematographer: Fiona Braillon – Solo Rex
- Best Actress: Liv Henneguier – Loups solitaires en mode passif
- Best Actor (ex-æquo): Wim Willaert & Lucas Moreau – Solo Rex

=== Jeunesse ===
- Youth Jury Prize: Marina directed by Stijn Coninx

=== Panorama ===
- Audience Award: Coming Home directed by Zhang Yimou

=== Premiers Rendez-vous ===
- Prix Premiers Rendez-vous:
  - Flore Bonaventura – Chinese Puzzle (Casse-tête chinois)
  - Paul Hamy – Suzanne

== 2015 edition ==
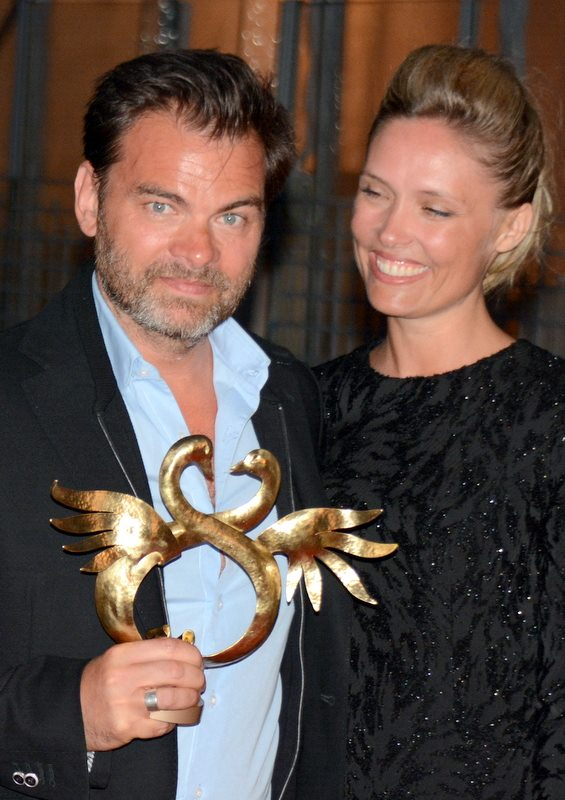
French actors Clovis Cornillac and Lilou Fogli at the 2015 edition

The 29th edition of the festival was held from 10 to 14 June 2015.

=== Feature film ===
Jury: Juliette Binoche (President), Mélanie Thierry, Céline Sallette, Jérôme Bonnell, Gilles Taurand, Raphaël Personnaz, Guillaume Schiffman, Luís Galvão Teles, Maxime Nucci

- Grand Prix: Short Skin directed by Duccio Chiarini
- Special Jury Prize: Zurich directed by Sacha Polak

=== Swann d'Or ===
- Best Film: Caprice directed by Emmanuel Mouret
- Best First Film: Blind Date (Un peu, beaucoup, aveuglément) directed by Clovis Cornillac
- Best Director: Arnaud Desplechin – My Golden Days (Trois souvenirs de ma jeunesse)
- Best Actress: Anaïs Demoustier – All About Them (À trois on y va)
- Best Actor: Benoît Magimel – Standing Tall (La Tête haute)
- Female Revelation: Joséphine Japy – Respire
- Male Revelation: Kévin Azaïs – Love at First Fight (Les Combattants)
- Coup de Cœur: Michel Legrand

=== Short film ===
Jury: Christophe Barratier (President), Alma Jodorowsky, Félix Moati, Marie Modiano, Finnegan Oldfield, Élisabeth Perez, Serge Riaboukine

- Best Short Film: Copain directed by Jan Roosens and Raf Roosens
- Best Actress (ex-æquo): Louisiane Gouverneur & Ilys Barillot – À qui la faute
- Best Actor: Benoit Hamon – Monsters Into Lovers (Jeunesse des loups-garous)

=== Jeunesse ===
- Youth Jury Prize: Short Skin directed by Duccio Chiarini

=== Panorama ===
- Essilor Audience Award: Words and Pictures directed by Fred Schepisi

=== Premiers Rendez-vous ===
- Prix Premiers Rendez-vous:
  - Sophie Verbeeck – All About Them (À trois on y va)
  - Rod Paradot – Standing Tall (La Tête haute)

== 2016 edition ==
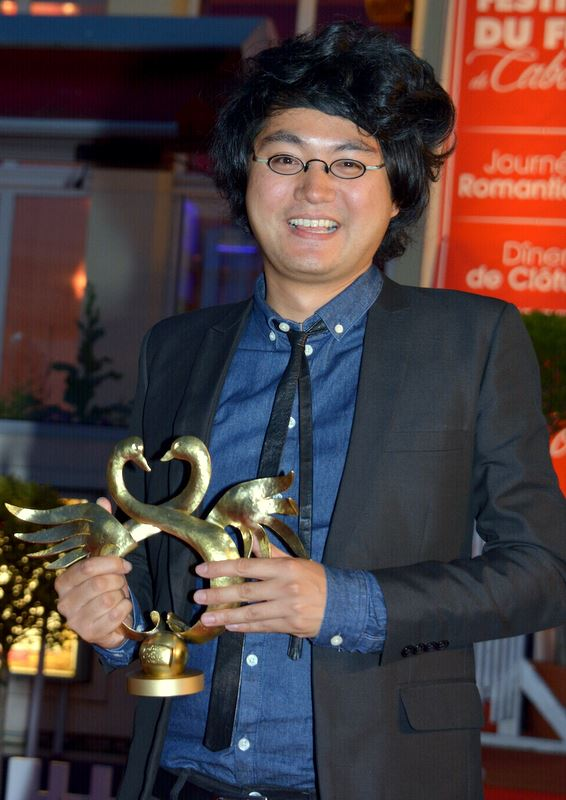
Cambodian-French filmmaker Davy Chou at the 2016 edition

The 30th edition of the festival was held from 8–12 June 2016.

=== Feature film ===
Jury: Emmanuelle Béart (President), Loubna Abidar, Samuel Benchetrit, Joeystarr, Éric Reinhardt, Pierre Rochefort, Julia Roy, Céline Sciamma

- Grand Prix: Diamond Island directed by Davy Chou

=== Jeunesse ===
- Youth Jury Prize: Departure directed by Andrew Steggall

=== Panorama ===
- Essilor Audience Award: A Man Called Ove directed by Hannes Holm

=== Short film ===
Jury: Pierre Schoeller (President), Marianne Basler, Frédérique Bel, Michel Feller, Jean-Baptiste Maunier, Diane Rouxel, Karidja Touré

- Best Short Film: Hotaru directed by William Laboury
  - Special Mention: Gabber Lover directed by Anna Cazenave Cambet
- Best Actress: Antonia Buresi – Que vive l'Empereur
- Best Actor: Jonathan Couzinié – Que vive l'Empereur

=== Swann d'Or ===
- Best Film: Les Ogres directed by Léa Fehner
- Best Director: Bouli Lanners – The First, the Last (Les Premiers, les Derniers)
- Best Actress: Louise Bourgoin – I Am a Soldier (Je suis un soldat)
- Best Actor: Manu Payet – Dad in Training (Tout pour être heureux)
- Female Revelation: Christa Théret – The Boss's Daughter (La Fille du patron)
- Male Revelation: Kacey Mottet Klein – Being 17 (Quand on a 17 ans)
- 50th Anniversary Tribute: A Man and a Woman (Un homme et une femme) directed by Claude Lelouch

=== Premiers Rendez-vous ===
- Prix Premiers Rendez-vous:
  - Noémie Schmidt – The Student and Mister Henri (L'Étudiante et Monsieur Henri)
  - (ex-æquo): François Nambot and Geoffrey Couët – Paris 05:59: Théo & Hugo (Théo et Hugo dans le même bateau)

== 2017 edition ==
The 31st edition of the festival was held from 14 to 18 June 2017.

=== Feature film ===
Jury: Marion Cotillard (President), Aure Atika, Camille Cottin, Anne Dorval, Hugo Gélin, Nathanaël Karmitz, Camille Laurens, Ibrahim Maalouf, Manu Payet

- Grand Prix: A Fantastic Woman directed by Sebastián Lelio
  - Special Mention: Mobile Homes directed by Vladimir de Fontenay

=== Jeunesse ===
- Youth Jury Prize: A Fantastic Woman directed by Sebastián Lelio

=== Panorama ===
- Audience Award: BPM (Beats per Minute) directed by Robin Campillo

=== Short film ===
Jury: Gabriel Le Bomin (President), Swann Arlaud, Olivier Chantreau, Élodie Frégé, Yaniss Lespert, Solene Rigot, Salomé Richard

- Best Short Film: Journée Blanche directed by Félix de Givry
- Best Actress: Adèle Simphal – L'Attente
- Best Actor: (ex-æquo) Théo Cholbi and Zacharie Chasseriaud – Tropique

=== Swann d'Or ===
- Best Film: The Midwife (Sage Femme) directed by Martin Provost
- Best Actress: Béatrice Dalle – Chacun sa vie
- Best Actor: Reda Kateb – Django
- Female Revelation: Doria Tillier – Mr. & Mrs. Adelman (Monsieur et Madame Adelman)
- Male Revelation: Rabah Nait Oufella – Nocturama

=== Premiers Rendez-vous ===
- Prix Premiers Rendez-vous:
  - Léna Magnien – Miss Impossible (Jamais contente)
  - Soufiane Guerrab – Patients

== 2018 edition ==
The 32nd edition of the festival was held from 13 to 17 June 2018.

=== Feature film ===
Jury: André Téchiné (President), Pascale Arbillot, Élodie Bouchez, Olga Kurylenko, Nahuel Pérez Biscayart, Raphaël, Géraldine Nakache, Karine Silla-Perez, Justin Taurand

- Grand Prix: Ága directed by Milko Azarov

=== Jeunesse ===
- Youth Jury Prize: Treat Me Like Fire (Joueurs) directed by Marie Monge

=== Panorama ===
- Audience Award: Monsieur directed by Rohena Gera

=== Short film ===
Jury: Ophélie Bau, François Civil, Julia Faure, Johan Heldenbergh, Thierry Klifa, Alysson Paradis, Alice Vial

- Best Short Film: Bye bye les Puceaux directed by Pierre Boulanger
- Best Actress: Yafa Abu Hijleh – Bye bye les Puceaux
- Best Actor: Jamil McCraven – Bye bye les Puceaux

=== Swann d'Or ===
- Best Film: Mektoub, My Love: Canto Uno directed by Abdellatif Kechiche
- Best Actress: Clémence Boisnard – La Fête est finie
- Best Actor: Anthony Bajon – The Prayer (La Prière)
- Female Revelation: Mélanie Thierry – Memoir of War (La douleur)
- Male Revelation: (ex-æquo) Pierre Deladonchamps and Vincent Lacoste – Sorry Angel (Plaire, aimer et courir vite)

=== Premiers Rendez-vous ===
- Prix Premiers Rendez-vous:
  - Laëtitia Clément – Luna
  - Shaïn Boumedine – Mektoub, My Love: Canto Uno

== 2019 edition ==
The 33rd edition of the festival was held from 12 to 16 June 2019.

=== Feature film ===
Jury: Sandrine Bonnaire (President), Naidra Ayadi, Eric Demarsan, Laetitia Dosch, Lou de Laâge, Oury Milshtein, Vincent Perez, Alice Pol, Danièle Thompson

- Grand Prix: Too Late to Die Young (Tarde Para Morir Joven) directed by Dominga Sotomayor

=== Jeunesse ===
- Youth Jury Prize: Aurora directed by Miia Tervo
  - Special Mention: Manta Ray directed by Phuttiphong Aroonpheng

=== Panorama ===
- Audience Award: Yesterday directed by Danny Boyle

=== Short film ===
Jury: Rebecca Zlotowski (President), Noée Abita, Santiago Amigorena, Shaïn Boumedine, Rahmatou Keïta, Jules Benchetrit, Lola Le Lann

- Best Short Film: Sous l'écorce directed by Ève-Chems de Brouwer
  - Special Mention: Elle s'appelait Baby directed by Mélanie Laleu et Baptiste Gourden
- Best Actress: Zoé Heran – Max
- Best Actor: Paul Nouhet – Les Méduses de Gouville

=== Swann d'Or ===
- Best Film: Love at Second Sight directed by Hugo Gélin
- Best Actress: Juliette Binoche – Who You Think I Am (Celle que vous croyez)
- Best Actor: Bouli Lanners – C’est ça l’amour
- Female Revelation: Nora Hamzawi – Non-Fiction (Doubles vies)
- Male Revelation: Karim Leklou – The World Is Yours (Le Monde est à toi)

=== Premiers Rendez-vous ===
- Prix Premiers Rendez-vous:
  - (ex-æquo) Sarah Henochsberg and Justine Lacroix – C’est ça l’amour
  - Tom Mercier – Synonymes

== See also ==
- Film festivals in France
