= 30th César Awards =

2005 French film awards ceremony

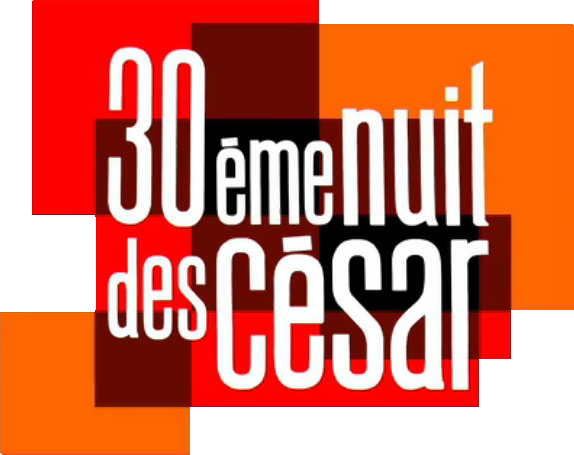
- Date: 26 February 2005
- Site: Théâtre du Châtelet, Paris, France
- Hosted by: Gad Elmaleh

Highlights
- Best Film: Games of Love and Chance
- Best Actor: Mathieu Amalric; Kings and Queen
- Best Actress: Yolande Moreau; When the Sea Rises

Television coverage
- Network: Canal+

The 30th César Awards ceremony, presented by the Académie des Arts et Techniques du Cinéma, honoured the best films of 2004 in France and took place on 26 February 2005 at the Théâtre du Châtelet in Paris. The ceremony was chaired by Isabelle Adjani and hosted by Gad Elmaleh. Games of Love and Chance won the award for Best Film.

== Winners and nominees ==
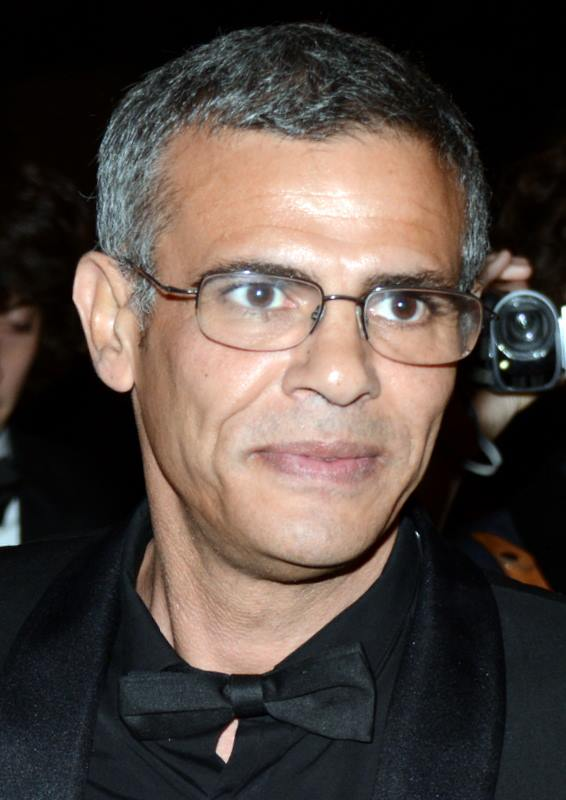
Abdellatif Kechiche, Best Film, Best Director and Best Original Screenplay or Adaptation winner

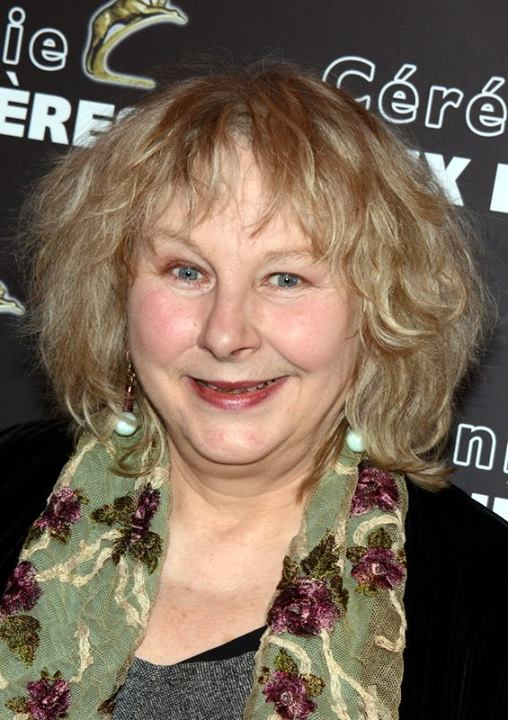
Yolande Moreau, Best Actress winner

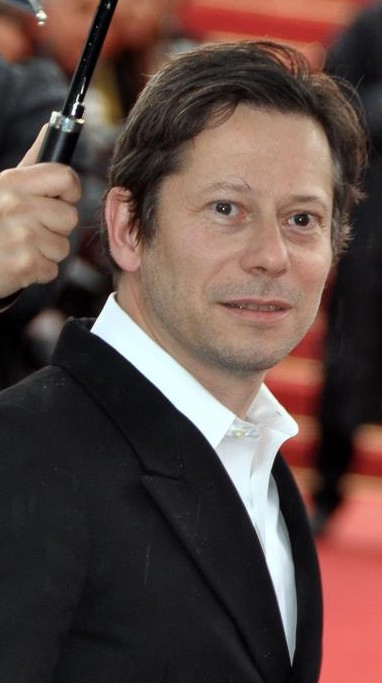
Mathieu Amalric, Best Actor winner

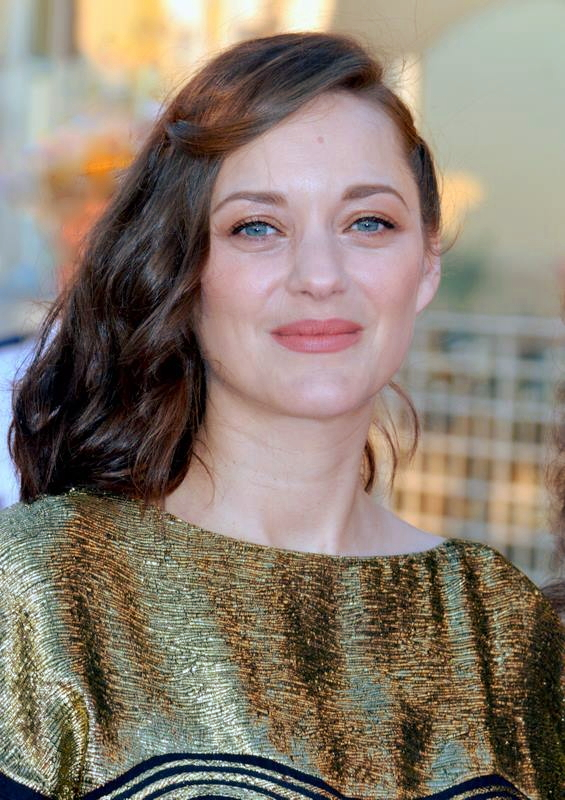
Marion Cotillard, Best Supporting Actress winner

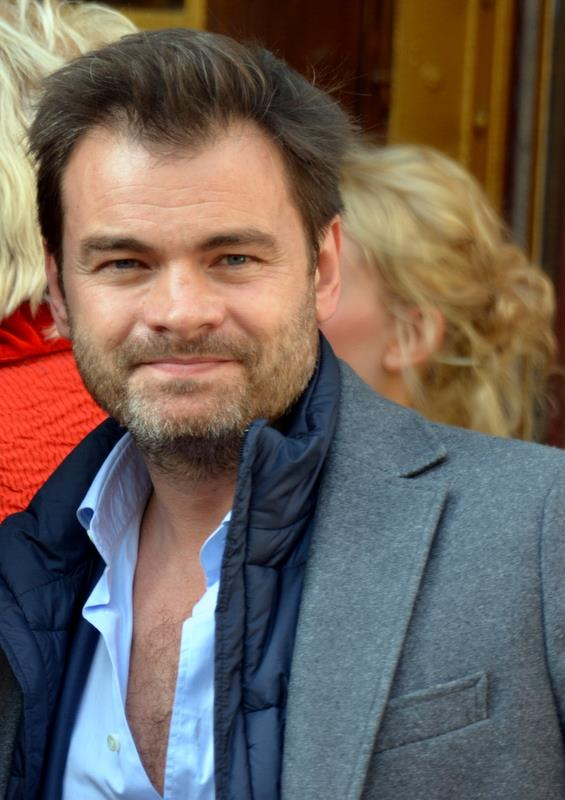
Clovis Cornillac, Best Supporting Actor winner

Best Film Games of Love and Chance: 36 Quai des Orfèvres; The Chorus; Kings and Queen; A Very Long Engagement	Best Director Abdellatif Kechiche – Games of Love and Chance: Olivier Marchal – 36 Quai des Orfèvres; Christophe Barratier – The Chorus; Arnaud Desplechin – Kings and Queen; Jean-Pierre Jeunet – A Very Long Engagement
Best Actor Mathieu Amalric – Kings and Queen: Daniel Auteuil – 36 Quai des Orfèvres; Gérard Jugnot – The Chorus; Benoît Poelvoorde – Podium; Philippe Torreton – The Light	Best Actress Yolande Moreau – When the Sea Rises: Maggie Cheung – Clean; Emmanuelle Devos – Kings and Queen; Audrey Tautou – A Very Long Engagement; Karin Viard – The Role of Her Life
Best Supporting Actor Clovis Cornillac – The Story of My Life: François Berléand – The Chorus; André Dussollier – 36 Quai des Orfèvres; Maurice Garrel – Kings and Queen; Jean-Paul Rouve – Podium	Best Supporting Actress Marion Cotillard – A Very Long Engagement: Ariane Ascaride – A Common Thread; Mylène Demongeot – 36 Quai des Orfèvres; Julie Depardieu – Podium; Émilie Dequenne – The Light
Most Promising Actor Gaspard Ulliel – A Very Long Engagement: Osman Elkharraz – Games of Love and Chance; Damien Jouillerot – Bad Spelling; Jérémie Renier – Work Hard, Play Hard; Malik Zidi – Changing Times	Most Promising Actress Sara Forestier – Games of Love and Chance: Marilou Berry – Look at Me; Lola Naymark – A Common Thread; Sabrina Ouazani – Games of Love and Chance; Magali Woch – Kings and Queen
Best Original Screenplay or Adaptation Games of Love and Chance – Abdellatif Kechiche and Ghalya Lacroix: 36 Quai des Orfèvres – Franck Mancuso, Olivier Marchal, Dominique Loiseau and Julien Rappeneau; Look at Me – Agnès Jaoui and Jean-Pierre Bacri; Kings and Queen – Arnaud Desplechin and Roger Bohbot; A Very Long Engagement – Jean-Pierre Jeunet and Guillaume Laurant	Best Film from the European Union (Tie) Ae Fond Kiss... & Life Is a Miracle: Bad Education; Mondovino; Saraband
Best First Feature Film When the Sea Rises: A Common Thread; The Chorus; Podium; Work Hard, Play Hard	Best Cinematography Bruno Delbonnel – A Very Long Engagement: Éric Gautier – Clean; Jean-Marie Dreujou – Two Brothers
Best Editing Noëlle Boisson – Two Brothers: Hachdé – 36 Quai des Orfèvres; Hervé Schneid – A Very Long Engagement	Best Sound Daniel Sobrino, Nicolas Cantin and Nicolas Naegelen – The Chorus: François Maurel, Pierre Mertens, Sylvain Lasseur and Joël Rangon – 36 Quai des Orfèvres; Vincent Arnardi, Gérard Hardy and Jean Umansky – A Very Long Engagement
Best Original Music Bruno Coulais – The Chorus: Nicola Piovani – The Light; Tony Gatlif and Delphine Mantoulet – Exils; Angelo Badalamenti – A Very Long Engagement	Best Costume Design Madeline Fontaine – A Very Long Engagement: Pierre-Jean Larroque – Arsène Lupin; Catherine Bouchard – Podium
Best Production Design Aline Bonetto – A Very Long Engagement: François Chauvaud – The Chorus; Jean-Pierre Fouillet – Immortal	Best Short Film Cousines: Hymne à la gazelle; La Méthode Bourchnikov; Les Parallèles
Best Foreign Film Lost in Translation: 21 Grams; The Motorcycle Diaries; Eternal Sunshine of the Spotless Mind; Fahrenheit 9/11
Honorary César Jacques Dutronc; Will Smith

== Viewers ==
The show was followed by 3.3 million viewers. This corresponds to 15.8% of the audience.

== See also ==
- 77th Academy Awards
- 58th British Academy Film Awards
- 17th European Film Awards
- 10th Lumière Awards
