= Mektoub, My Love: Canto Due =

2025 film by Abdellatif Kechiche

- Promotional poster
- Directed by: Abdellatif Kechiche
- Screenplay by: Abdellatif Kechiche; Ghalia Lacroix
- Based on: La Blessure, la vraie by François Bégaudeau
- Produced by: Abdellatif Kechiche
- Starring: Shaïn Boumedine; Ophélie Bau; Salim Kechiouche
- Cinematography: Marco Graziaplena
- Edited by: Luc Seugé; Alexis Goyard
- Production companies: Pathé Films; Bling Flamingo; Quat'sous Films; Why Not Productions; Goodfellas
- Distributed by: Pathé Films
- Release dates: 9 August 2025 (Locarno); 3 December 2025 (France)
- Running time: 139 minutes
- Country: France
- Languages: French; Arabic; English

Mektoub, My Love: Canto Due is a 2025 French romantic drama film produced, co-written, and directed by Abdellatif Kechiche. The film is the third and final installment in Kechiche's Mektoub, My Love series, following Canto Uno (2017) and Intermezzo (2019). As its predecessors, it is based on 2011 novel La Blessure, la vraie by François Bégaudeau. It stars Shaïn Boumedine, Ophélie Bau, Salim Kechiouche, Jessica Pennington and Andre Jacobs.

The film had its world premiere in the main competition of the 78th Locarno Film Festival on 9 August 2025, where it was nominated for the Golden Leopard, and received positive reviews by the French press. At the 31st Lumière Awards, it was nominated for Best Film, Best Director and Best Female Revelation (Pennington).

It was theatrically released in France on 3 December by Pathé.

== Synopsis ==
After completing his studies in Paris, Amin returns to Sète with his passion for film still burning. In September 1994, a chance encounter with a vacationing American producer brings unexpected interest in his screenplay, The Essential Elements of Universal Existence, and the producer suggests his young wife Jess for the lead role. But destiny, with its unpredictable whims, has other plans in store.

== Cast ==
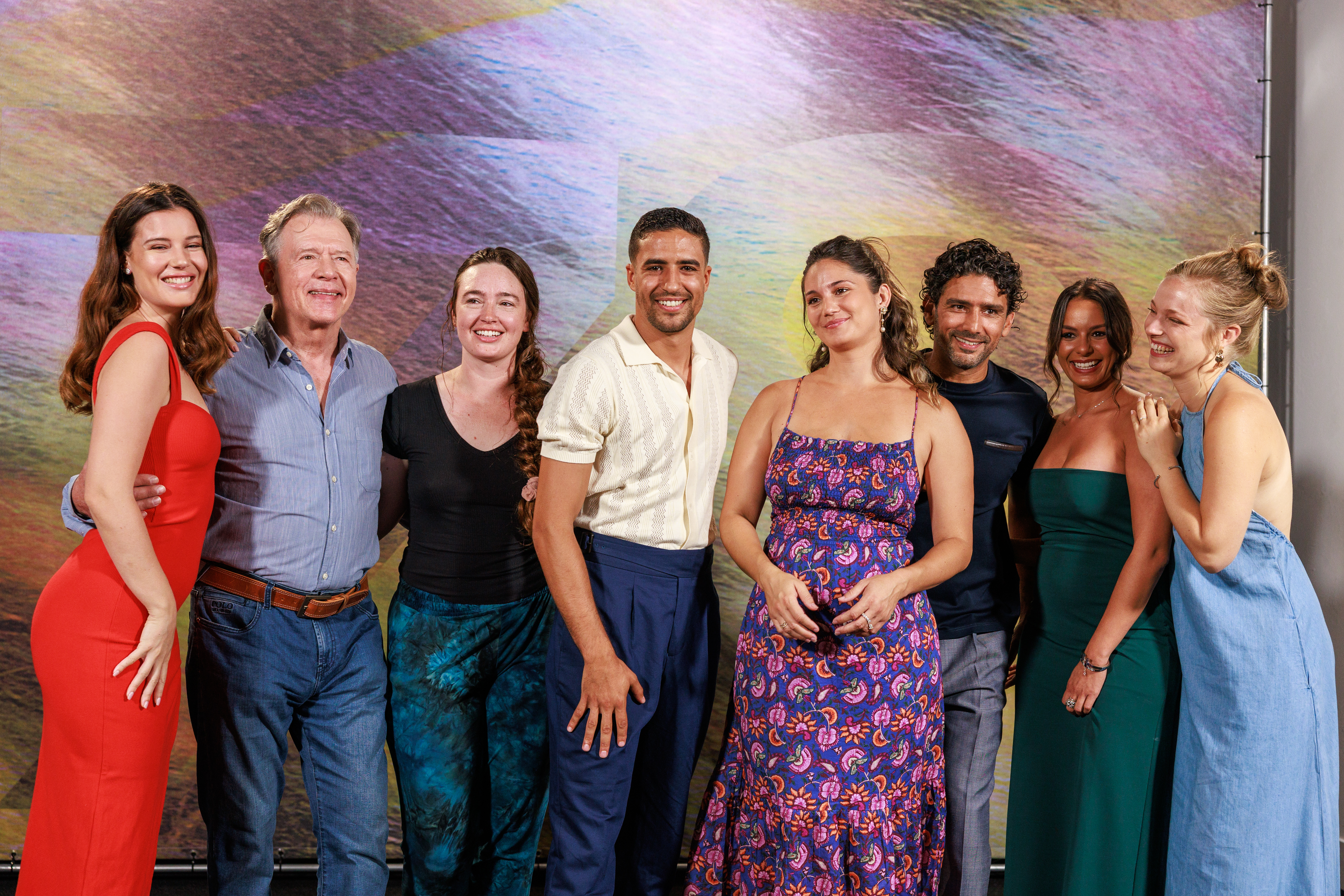
Cast during Locarno premiere

- Shaïn Boumedine as Amin
- Ophélie Bau as Ophélie
- Jessica Pennington as Jessica Patterson (Jess)
- Salim Kechiouche as Tony
- Andre Jacobs as Jack Patterson
- Dany Martial as Dany
- Hafsia Herzi as Camélia
- Alexia Chardard as Charlotte
- Delinda Kechiche as Amin's Mother
- Lou Luttiau as Céline
- Marie Bernard as Marie
- Meleinda Elasfour as Mel
- Roméo De Lacour as Aimé
- Kamel Saadi as Kamel
- Hatika Karaoui as Tony's Mother

== Production ==
Production wrapped in 2019, filming took place simultaneously with its predecessor Mektoub, My Love: Intermezzo.

Following Intermezzo (2019) world premiere at the 2019 Cannes Film Festival, Bau and Kechiche had a fallout due to the inclusion of a 13-minute unsimulated sex scene in the final cut, which alongside Kechiche's production company insolvent status, led Canto Due to a post-production limbo of nearly 7 years.

== Release ==
Mektoub, My Love: Canto Due had its world premiere at the 78th Locarno Film Festival on 9 August 2025, and competed for Golden Leopard. Kechiche was absent due to a recent stroke, while the main cast and line producer Riccardo Marchegiani attended the press Q&A. When asked about the Intermezzo (2019) off-set allegations, Bau declined any comments on it, while other cast members defended the filmmaker and the film.

It was theatrically released in France on 3 December 2025 by Pathé.

== Reception ==
Peter Bradshaw of The Guardian rated the film two stars out of five, calling the film "another heady dose of flirting, farce and bafflement."

However, the film received positive reviews from French critics. AlloCiné reported that French critics were "charmed by this sequel," noting that unlike the divisive reception of Intermezzo, "for this new installment, all critics are enthusiastic." Libération described it as "magnificent reunions" featuring "between sitcom parody and melancholy of blocked destinies." Le Monde called the film "sensual" and "furiously funny." Trois Couleurs praised it as "surprising in its restraint" and described it as concluding "a work already legendary" with "a mixture of mischief and twilight beauty."

== Accolades ==
At the 31st Lumière Awards, it was nominated for Best Film, Best Director and Best Female Revelation (Pennington).

Award	Date of ceremony	Category	Recipient	Result	Ref.
Locarno Film Festival	16 August 2025	Golden Leopard	Mektoub, My Love: Canto Due	Nominated	
Locarno Film Festival	16 August 2025	Junior Jury Awards	Mektoub, My Love: Canto Due	Third Prize	
Lumière Awards	18 January 2026	Best Film	Mektoub, My Love: Canto Due	Nominated	
Lumière Awards	18 January 2026	Best Director	Abdellatif Kechiche	Nominated	
Lumière Awards	18 January 2026	Best Female Revelation	Jessica Pennington	Nominated	
