= Shaïn Boumedine =

French actor (born 1996)

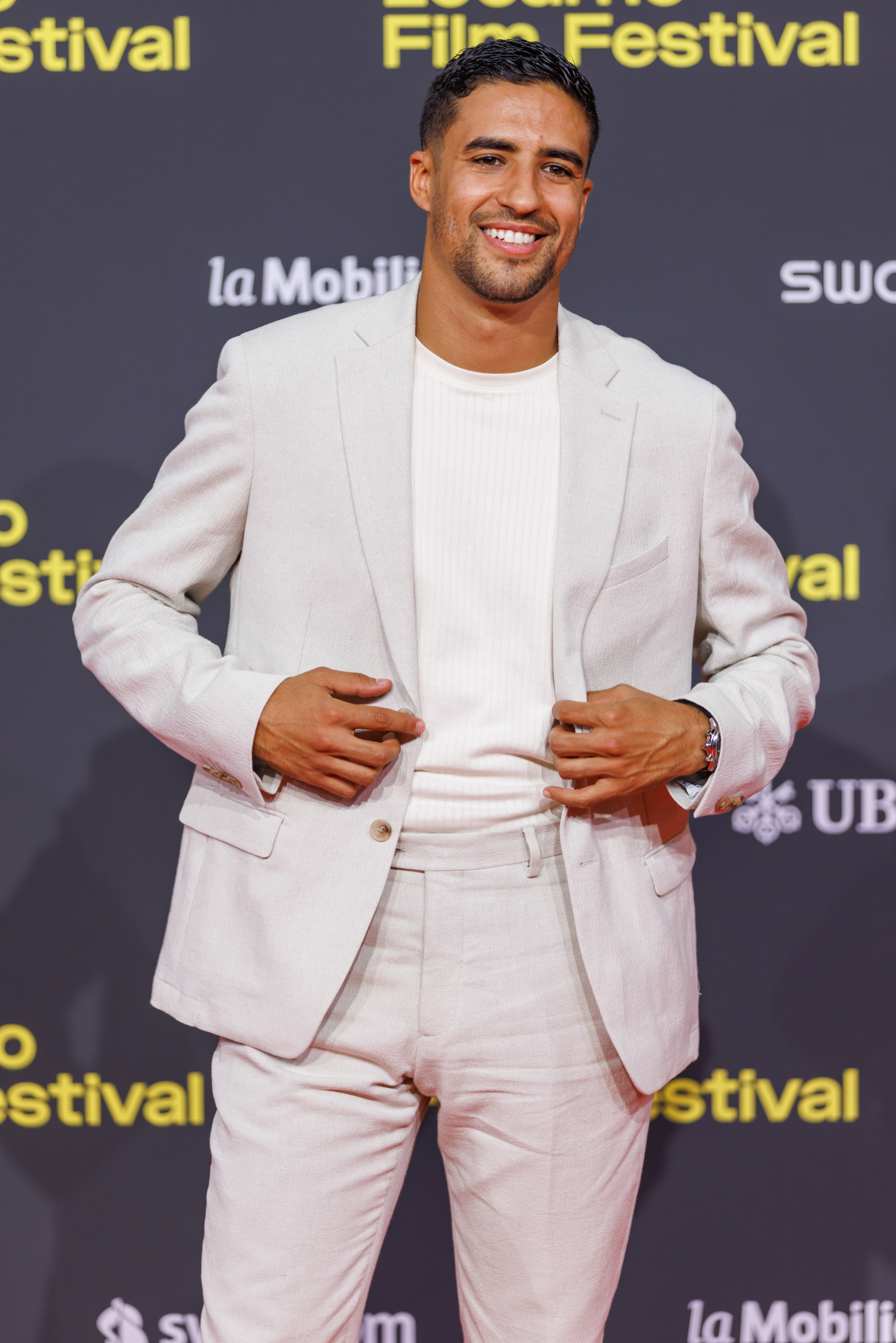
- Boumedine in 2025
- Born: 25 March 1996 (age 29); Montpellier, France
- Occupation: Actor
- Years active: 2017–present

Shaïn Boumedine (born 25 March 1996) is a French actor. He has starred in films such as Mektoub, My Love: Canto Uno (2017) and its sequels Mektoub, My Love: Intermezzo (2019) and Mektoub, My Love: Canto Due (2025), and also in Atomic Summer (2020), The Road Ahead (2022), For My Country (2022), and The Good Teacher (2024), and in the television series Savages (2019).

== Early life ==
Boumedine was born on 25 March 1996 in Montpellier, France, to an Algerian father and a Moroccan mother.

== Career ==
Boumedine made his film debut as Amin, the lead character in Abdellatif Kechiche's Mektoub, My Love: Canto Uno (2017), and reprised his role in the sequels Mektoub, My Love: Intermezzo (2019), and Mektoub, My Love: Canto Due (2025).

He has also appeared in films suchs as Atomic Summer (2020), The Road Ahead (2022), For My Country (2022), and The Good Teacher (2024), and in the television series Savages (2019).

== Filmography ==
=== Feature films ===
Year	Title	Role	Director
2017	Mektoub, My Love: Canto Uno	Amin	Abdellatif Kechiche
2019	Mektoub, My Love: Intermezzo	Amin	Abdellatif Kechiche
2020	Atomic Summer	Victor	Gaël Lépingle
2022	The Road Ahead	Elias	Nessim Chikhaoui
2022	For My Country	Aïssa Saïdi	Rachid Hami
2024	The Good Teacher	Walid	Teddy Lussi-Modeste
2025	Mektoub, My Love: Canto Due	Amin	Abdellatif Kechiche

=== Short films ===
Year	Title	Role	Director
2020	Petite princesse	Lamine	Eric Forestier
2023	It's Gonna Be Okay	Guy in the car	Thibaut Buccellato

=== Television ===
Year	Title	Role	Notes
2019	Savages	Slim Nerrouche	Miniseries; main role

== Accolades ==
Year	Award / Festival	Category	Work	Result	Ref.
2018	Cabourg Film Festival	Premier Rendez-Vous	Mektoub, My Love: Canto Uno	Won	
