= This Teacher =

- Film poster
- Directed by: Mark Jackson
- Written by: Mark Jackson; Dana Thompson
- Produced by: Mark Jackson; Dana Thompson; Gigi Graff; Josh Mandel; Javier Gonzalez
- Starring: Hafsia Herzi; Sarah Kazemy; Lucy Walters; Kevin Kane; Lev Gorn; Gabe Fazio; Rebekah del Rio
- Cinematography: John Barr
- Edited by: Mark Jackson; Gary Chan
- Music by: Dave Eggar; Chuck Palmer
- Distributed by: Breaking Glass Pictures
- Release date: September 22, 2018 (Los Angeles)
- Running time: 95 minutes
- Country: United States
- Language: English

This Teacher is a 2018 film directed by Mark Jackson and distributed by Breaking Glass Pictures.

The film premiered at the 2018 LA Film Festival, where it won the U.S. Fiction Award. It also was the closing night film of the 2019 Slamdance Film Festival.

== Plot ==
A French Muslim woman (Hafsia Herzi) travels to New York City from the rough neighborhoods outside of Paris to visit her childhood best friend Zahra (Sarah Kazemy). Hafsia finds that Zahra was not the girl she knew growing up in Paris. She now goes by Sarah and has completely assimilated into Western culture. Sarah explains to her much older boyfriend (Gabe Fazio) that Hafsia stinks and she doesn't want her to stay there anymore, which Hafsia overhears. Hafsia steals Sarah's credit card and identity, then disappears to a remote cabin upstate. Deep in the woods and alone for the first time in her life, she experiences a divine revelation. Sarah arrives and tries to convince Hafsia to return with her, which she refuses.

An animal breaks into Hafsia's cabin and steals all the food. Initially a couple, teacher Rose (Lucy Walters) and policeman Darren (Kevin Kane), help her. But Hafsia begins to see intolerance and suspicion which reflects back to an Islamophobic America. This third act explores themes such as the inherent racism and naivety that comes along with being a white American, that most white Americans don't even know they have or the rampant Islamophobia that has overtaken most of the world, and the difficulties of being a Muslim, particularly a Muslim woman, in a post-911 world.

== Critical reception ==
The film received positive reviews from critics, the review aggregator website Rotten Tomatoes reported that 100% of critics have given the film a positive review based on seven reviews.
