= Circumstance (2011 film) =

2011 film by Maryam Keshavarz

- Theatrical release poster
- شرایط
- Directed by: Maryam Keshavarz
- Written by: Maryam Keshavarz
- Starring: Nikohl Boosheri; Sarah Kazemy; Reza Sixo Safai; Keon Mohajeri
- Cinematography: Brian Rigney Hubbard
- Edited by: Andrea Chignoli
- Music by: Gingger Shankar
- Production companies: Marakesh Films; A Space Between; Bago Pictures; Neon Productions; Menagerie Pictures
- Distributed by: Participant Media; Roadside Attractions
- Release date: January 23, 2011; (Sundance Film Festival)
- Running time: 108 minutes
- Countries: France; Iran; United States
- Language: Persian
- Budget: $1 million
- Box office: $555,511

Circumstance (Persian: شرایط, romanized: Šar'ayet; French: En secret) is a 2011 drama film written and directed by Maryam Keshavarz starring Nikohl Boosheri, Sarah Kazemy, Reza Sixo Safai and Keon Alexander. It explores homosexuality in modern Iran, among other subjects.

== Plot ==
Atafeh (Nikohl Boosheri) is the teenage daughter of a wealthy Iranian family in Tehran. She and her best friend, the orphaned Shireen (Sarah Kazemy) attend illicit parties and experiment with sex, drinking, and drugs.

Atafeh's brother Mehran (Reza Sixo Safai) is a recovering drug addict who becomes increasingly religious and obsessed with Shireen, coinciding with the collapse of his once-strong relationship with his sister.

The heads of the family are the Hakimi parents, Firouz and Azar, who reminisce on their youth and what has become and what will become of their family.

== Production ==
Set in Iran and released with subtitled Persian dialogue, the film was shot in Lebanon. Circumstance contains a few English and French phrases. The budget was less than US$1 million.

Maryam Keshavarz, the director, was raised in the United States but spent summers in Shiraz, Iran. She used experiences in Shiraz to direct towards the movie, such as being very adventurous and experimenting within the scenes of partying and hearing about her cousin's whipping at the hands of the morality police, in the plot. Circumstance was the first full-length feature film she directed.

Keshavarz said that she wanted to make as authentic to Iranian culture as possible because, while Circumstance would likely be banned in Iran, Iranians would see the film via illegally imported copies. All of the main actors were fluent in Persian. Because the Persian they knew was dated from before the 1979 Iranian revolution, the film creators used a dialect coach. Of the actors of the three most prominent characters, all were members of the Iranian diaspora and were born to parents who left Iran around the time of the revolution, and all three had family members in Iran. Two of those actors visited family in Iran. Nikohl Boosheri, who did not visit relatives in Iran, said that she socialized with Iranians in her hometown, Vancouver, British Columbia, Canada to get a better idea of what the contemporary Persian spoken in Iran was like; many of them were recent immigrants from Iran. Sarah Kazemy, a Paris resident, visited relatives in Tehran while researching her role. She said goodbye to her relatives before leaving Iran; because of her role in the film, Iranian authorities could prevent her from entering the country for much of the foreseeable future.

Boosheri said that the film creators chose Beirut, Lebanon as the filming location because "[i]t was the right Middle Eastern feeling, it had the essence. And in Iran we wouldn’t have had the freedom to do what we did." Because the militant Shia Islamist group Hezbollah, supported by the Iranian government, operated in Lebanon, the filmmakers did not wish to make the true intention of the film public at the time of the filming. They sent a false script to the Lebanese authorities and told them that they were making Keshavarz's thesis film, while in reality, they were making a commercial film. Lebanese authorities did have encounters with the actors while filming occurred. Larry Rohter of The New York Times said "[i]n the end, Reza Sixo Safai and other cast members agreed, that sense of constant anxiety and dread actually helped strengthen their performances."

== Release and reaction ==
=== Critical reception ===
Reviews of the film were mostly positive. On the review aggregator website Rotten Tomatoes, 86% of 69 critics' reviews are positive, with an average rating of 7/10. The website's consensus reads: "A thought-provoking, insightful look into Iranian youth culture."

Since the film was released, both the film was banned as well as Keshavarz herself was banned from returning to Iran by the Iranian authorities.

== Awards and nominations ==
Circumstance won the Audience Award: Dramatic at the 2011 Sundance Film Festival and was ranked one of the 50 best movies of 2011 by Paste Magazine. The film won the Audience Favorite award, Best Director and Best Actress at the 2011 Noor Iranian Film Festival. It won Best Feature Film at the 2011 Paris Lesbian and Feminist Film Festival.

Autostraddle ranked the film in 27th in the 102 best lesbian movies of all time.

== Soundtrack ==
The film uses music from many Iranian and foreign artists, such as Leila Forouhar, Shahrum Kashani, Andy, and the band Zedbazi. Singer Ginger Shankar also composed the music. The film also uses rap songs, such as the song "Zan" by Farinaz. The soundtrack for this work is a joint publication of the American company Milan Records and Universal.

List of movie songs
Row	Song	Singer	Time
1	Bordi Az Yadam	Leila Forouhar, Jas Ahluwalia, Bahman Sarram	1:42
2	Reza's Theme	Gingger Shankar	2:15
3	Party	Zedbazi	4:22
4	Zamin Safe	Zedbazi	6:30
5	Forbidden Love	Gingger Shankar, Shahzad Ismaily	1:29
6	The Swim	Gingger Shankar	0:56
7	The Prayer	Sussan Deyhim	0:43
8	Fantasy Love Theme	Gingger Shankar	1:20
9	Finding You	Gingger Shankar	2:30
10	Sahraie	Andy	3:26
11	Between Worlds	Gingger Shankar, David Christophere	5:11
12	The Prayer 2	Sussan Deyhim	1:00
13	Surveillance Theme	Gingger Shankar	1:13
14	Within Reach - Car Chase	Janani Shankar, Jake Synder, Stevie Snyder, MT	1:21
15	The Prayer 3	Sussan Deyhim	0:44
16	Shireen Is Lost	Gingger Shankar	1:38
17	Agrabeh Zolfeh Kajet	Fataneh Eghbali, Keyavash Nourai	2:09
18	Dokhtar Bandari	Shahrum Kashani	5:12
19	Reza's Dark Theme	Gingger Shankar	0:36
20	Love Theme Part 2	Gingger Shankar	1:12
21	Reza Discovered	Gingger Shankar	1:44
22	Confrontation	Gingger Shankar	0:50
23	Within Reach (Full Version)	Janani Shankar, Jake Synder, Stevie Snyder, MT	1:25
24	Be Nam Zaan	Farinaz	4:00

== See also ==
- List of LGBT films directed by women
