= Mektoub, My Love: Canto Uno =

2017 film

- Film poster
- Directed by: Abdellatif Kechiche
- Screenplay by: Abdellatif Kechiche; Ghalia Lacroix
- Based on: La Blessure, la vraie by François Bégaudeau
- Produced by: Abdellatif Kechiche; Riccardo Marchegiani
- Starring: Shaïn Boumedine; Salim Kechiouche; Ophélie Bau; Hafsia Herzi; Lou Luttiau; Alexia Chardard
- Cinematography: Marco Graziaplena
- Edited by: Maria Giménez Cavallo; Nathanaëlle Gerbeaux
- Music by: Rémi Barbot
- Production companies: Quat'sous Films; Good Films
- Distributed by: Pathé
- Release dates: 7 September 2017 (Venice); 21 March 2018 (France); 24 May 2018 (Italy)
- Running time: 181 minutes
- Countries: France; Italy
- Language: French
- Budget: €8.6 million
- Box office: US$1.2 million

Mektoub, My Love: Canto Uno is a 2017 French romantic drama film produced, co-written, and directed by Abdellatif Kechiche. The film is an adaptation of François Bégaudeau's novel La Blessure, la vraie. It was screened in the main competition section of the 74th Venice International Film Festival. Two sequels were released in the following years, Intermezzo in 2019 and Canto Due in 2025.

== Plot ==
In 1994, Amin, a former medical student looking to become a screenwriter, returns from Paris to his hometown of Sète. While there he falls for Ophélie, a young woman who is engaged to another man, but who is having an affair with Amin's cousin Tony.

== Cast ==
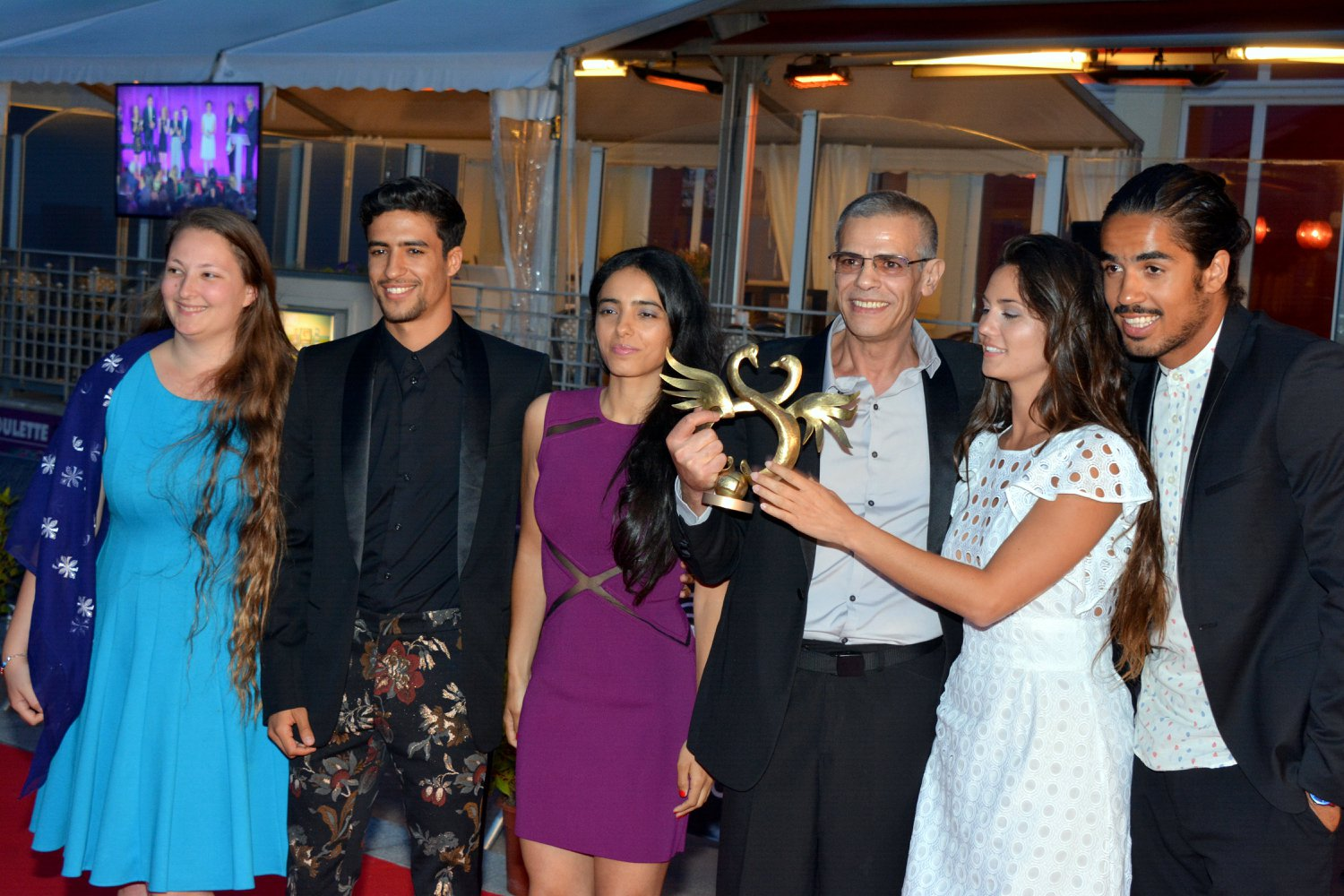
Giménez Cavallo, Boumédine, Herzi, Kechiche, Bau, and Bau's boyfriend at the 2018 Cabourg Film Festival

- Shaïn Boumedine as Amin
- Ophélie Bau as Ophélie
- Salim Kechiouche as Tony
- Lou Luttiau as Céline
- Alexia Chardard as Charlotte
- Hafsia Herzi as Camélia
- Kamel Saadi as Kamel

== Production ==
In 2017 Kechiche announced he was auctioning off the Palme d'or he had received for his previous film Blue Is the Warmest Colour in order to finish the film. Producers for Mektoub had withdrawn funds during post-production after discovering that Kechiche intended to split Mektoub into two or three films. Kechiche did find the funds necessary to finish the film and succeeded in splitting the film with the sequel, Mektoub, My Love: Intermezzo premiering in 2019.

== Critical response ==
On review aggregator Rotten Tomatoes, the film holds an approval rating of 55%, based on 20 reviews, with an average rating of 5.2/10. On Metacritic, which uses a weighted average, the film has a score of 59 out of 100, based on 9 critics, indicating "mixed or average reviews".
