= Rod Paradot =

French actor

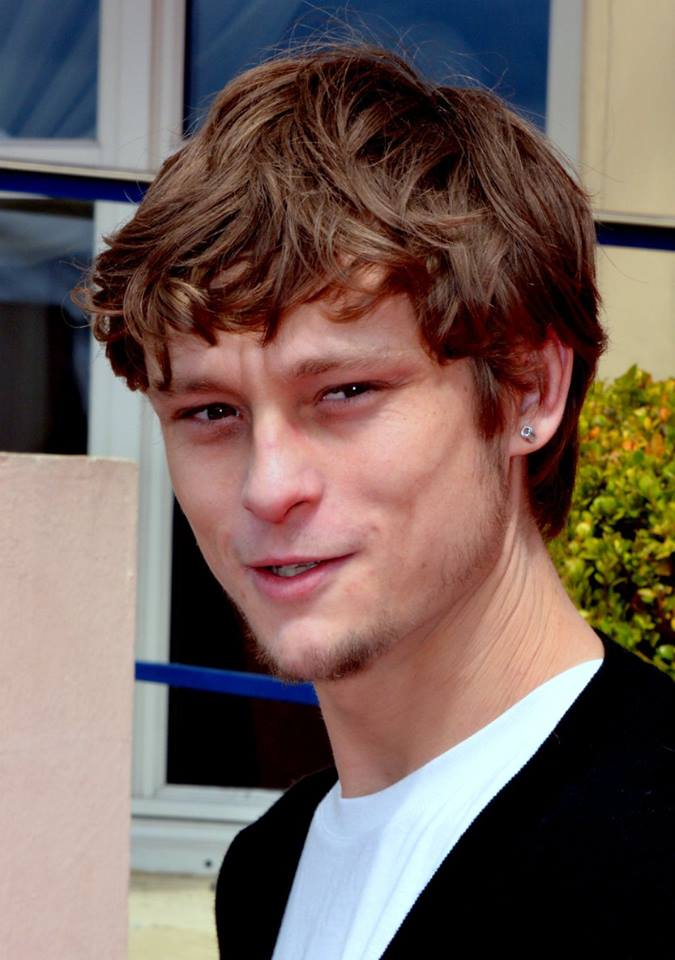
- Rod Paradot at the 2018 Cabourg Film Festival
- Born: 4 April 1996 (age 29); Saint-Denis, Seine-Saint-Denis, France
- Occupation: Actor
- Years active: 2015–present

Rod Paradot (born 1996) is a French actor. He won the César Award for Most Promising Actor in 2016 for his role in Standing Tall.

== Filmography ==
| Year | Title | Role | Director | Notes |
|---|---|---|---|---|
| 2015 | Standing Tall | Malony Ferrandot | Emmanuelle Bercot | Cabourg Film Festival - Prix Premiers Rendez-vous; César Award for Most Promising Actor; Lumière Award for Best Male Revelation |
| 2017 | Luna | | Elsa Diringer | |
| 2017 | Arborg | Lucas | Antoine Delelis | Short |
| 2017 | Capitaine Marleau | Gabriel | Josée Dayan | TV series (1 episode) |
| 2018 | Campers | Mateo | Léa Morel | Short |
| 2020 | Lost Bullet | Quentin | Guillaume Pierret | |
| 2022 | Umami | Nino Carvin | Slony Sow | |

In 2019 Paradot starred in Petit Biscuit's "We Were Young" music video.
