= Umami (film) =

- Directed by: Slony Sow
- Written by: Slony Sow
- Starring: Gérard Depardieu; Sandrine Bonnaire; Pierre Richard; Rod Paradot; Bastien Bouillon
- Cinematography: Denis Louis
- Music by: Frédéric Holyszewski, with a special appearance by Sugizo
- Production companies: Oliver-Frost Films, Slony Pictures, Sunny Side Up Never, Nompareille Productions
- Release date: 28 January 2022 (Premiers Plans Angers)
- Running time: 103 minutes (original version); 92 minutes (shorter version)
- Countries: France; Japan
- Languages: French; Japanese
- Box office: $206,530

Umami is a 2022 French-Japanese film, directed and written by Slony Sow, starring Gérard Depardieu as a French chef who travels to Japan to find a rival chef who once defeated him in a prestigious competition. It was filmed in France and Japan; principal photography was paused in March 2020 due to the COVID-19 lockdown, which also caused general release to be delayed until February 2023. Its theatrical release in France was impacted by the sexual assault accusations against Depardieu.

== Plot ==
Gabriel Carvin, a Michelin-starred chef from Saumur, is awarded his third crystal star by a culinary critic. The same evening, his wife, Louise, leaves him. This brutal separation triggers a family crisis. For Gabriel, the overflow strikes him to the heart. To clear his mind, he goes to Japan, which will allow him to reconnect with the simple pleasures of friendship and try to discover the mysteries of umami, the fifth taste of the palate.

== Cast ==
- Gérard Depardieu : Gabriel Carvin
- Sandrine Bonnaire : Louise Carvin
- Pierre Richard : Rufus
- Rod Paradot : Nino Carvin
- Bastien Bouillon : Jean Carvin
- You : Noriko
- Kyōzō Nagatsuka : Tetsuichi Morita
- Eriko Takeda : Fumi Morita
- Kyōko Koizumi : Taya
- Antoine Duléry : Robert
- Zinedine Soualem : Mohamad
- Assa Sylla : la bookeuse

== Production ==
Principal photography took place in Hokkaido, Japan (February 2020) and the Loire region in France (June 2020). It was interrupted in March 2020 by the COVID-19 pandemic, until it could resume in June. Filming in France took place largely in the area near Saumur in Maine-et-Loire, including at the Fontevraud Abbey, the Château de Montreuil-Bellay, the Château de Montsoreau and along the banks of the Loire. Some scenes were also filmed in Thouars (Deux-Sèvres). The cast included Pierre Richard, as a nod to the highly popular 1980s comedies of the 1980s that paired him with Depardieu.

== Reception ==
Comparing Umami to films including Babel and Tampopo, a review in Stuff called it "a whimsical film that stays on the right side of cloying". Le Figaro Magazine (Pierre de Boishue) on 12 May 2023 reviewed the film with two stars, describing it as "a taste of radiance" with "so many ingredients that give the whole thing a refreshing taste".

The original (103 minute) version of the film appeared at the Festival International du Film de Comédie de Liège, the Oslo Films from the South Festival, the Alliance Française French Film Festival in Australia and in Chicago, the vOilah! French Film Festival in Singapore and was the festival opening film at the Fribourg International Film Festival and Yokohama International Film Festival.

The original version of Umami opened theatrically in Germany (under the title Der Geschmack der kleinen Dinge) on 9 February 2023 initially on 142 screens, increasing to 147 screens in following weeks due to its positive reception. The film remained in German cinemas until the week of 14 January 2024.

In April 2023, one month before the French theatrical release, website Mediapart released a report stating that over a dozen women were accusing lead actor Gérard Depardieu of sexual assault. The actor's public image was severely impacted in France; at the end of the month, the film's producers decided to exclude him from promotion. On 17 May 2023 a shortened (92 minute) version of Umami opened in France on 251 screens, to poor box office results.

Umami (original version) was released theatrically in Switzerland, Belgium (short version), Taiwan, the Netherlands, Spain, Colombia, Israel, Singapore, Estonia, Hong Kong, Bulgaria, Mexico, Italy, Hungary, Austria, Australia and New Zealand. It was not released theatrically in the US, UK and Canada due to the Depardieu allegations. The original version of the film was released online in Russia and China.

The film's original version appeared as in-flight entertainment on airlines including Delta Air Lines, QANTAS, Cathay Pacific, Emirates, Corsair, Air India, Vietnam Airlines, EVA Air, WestJet, China Airlines, Gulf Air, Etihad, Qatar Airways, and Air France (Air France releasing the short version).

== Home video ==
Umami was published on DVD and Blu-Ray, and on VOD on several streaming services including Apple TV, Canal+ and Amazon Prime.
