= Good Mother (film) =

2021 film

- French: Bonne Mère
- Directed by: Hafsia Herzi
- Screenplay by: Hafsia Herzi
- Produced by: Saïd Ben Saïd; Michel Merkt
- Starring: Halima Benhamed; Sabrina Benhamed
- Cinematography: Jérémie Attard
- Edited by: Eric Armbruster; Camille Toubkis
- Music by: Remi Durel
- Release dates: 10 July 2021 (Cannes); 21 July 2021 (France)
- Country: France
- Language: French

Good Mother (French: Bonne Mère) is a 2021 French drama film directed by Hafsia Herzi. In June 2021, the film was selected to compete in the Un Certain Regard section at the 2021 Cannes Film Festival. At Cannes, it won the Ensemble Prize in the Un Certain Regard section.

== Cast ==
- Halima Benhamed as Nora
- Sabrina Benhamed as Sabah
- Jawed Hannachi Herzi as Jawed
- Mourad Tahar Boussatha as Ellyes
- Malik Bouchenaf as Amir
- Justine Grégory as Muriel
