= Primaire =

- Directed by: Hélène Angel
- Written by: Hélène Angel; Yann Coridian; Olivier Gorce; Agnès de Sacy
- Produced by: Hélène Cases
- Starring: Sara Forestier
- Cinematography: Yves Angelo
- Edited by: Sylvie Lager; Christophe Pinel
- Music by: Philippe Miller
- Production company: Lionceau Films
- Distributed by: StudioCanal
- Release dates: 11 November 2016 (Les Arcs International Film Festival); 4 January 2017
- Running time: 105 minutes
- Country: France
- Language: French
- Box office: $1.2 million

Primaire is a 2016 French drama film directed by Hélène Angel.

== Plot ==
Florence is a school teacher devoted to her students. When she meets little Sasha, a troubled child, she will do everything possible to save him, even if she abandons her life as a mother or a woman and even calls into question her vocation. Florence will gradually realize that learning is not confined only to the little ones and that it is never too late to learn.

== Cast ==
- Sara Forestier as Florence Mautret
- Vincent Elbaz as Mathieu
- Albert Cousi as Denis Mautret
- Ghillas Bendjoudi as Sacha Drouet
- Guilaine Londez as Madame Duru
- Hannah Brunt as Charlie
- Olivia Côte as Marlène Peillard
- Patrick d'Assumçao as M. Sabatier
- Laure Calamy as Christina Drouet
- Lucie Desclozeaux as Laure
- Denis Sebbah as M. Hadjaj
- Frédéric Boismoreau as Rémi
- Hervé Caullery as M. Teboul
- Jules Gaboriau as Jean-Philippe
