= Mektoub, My Love: Intermezzo =

2019 film by Abdellatif Kechiche

- Festival de Cannes poster
- Directed by: Abdellatif Kechiche
- Screenplay by: Abdellatif Kechiche; Ghalia Lacroix
- Based on: La Blessure, la vraie by François Bégaudeau
- Produced by: Abdellatif Kechiche; Ardavan Safaee; Jérôme Seydoux
- Starring: Shaïn Boumedine; Ophélie Bau; Salim Kechiouche; Alexia Chardard; Lou Luttiau; Hafsia Herzi
- Cinematography: Marco Graziaplena
- Edited by: Edgar Allender; Nathanaëlle Gerbeaux; Maria Giménez Cavallo
- Production companies: Pathé Films; Quat'sous Films; Futurikon
- Distributed by: Pathé Films
- Release date: 23 May 2019 (Cannes)
- Running time: 212 minutes
- Country: France
- Language: French

Mektoub, My Love: Intermezzo is an unreleased 2019 French erotic drama film produced, co-written, and directed by Abdellatif Kechiche. The film is a sequel to Kechiche's 2017 film Mektoub, My Love: Canto Uno, and like its predecessor, is based on the novel La Blessure, la vraie written by François Bégaudeau. It stars Shaïn Boumedine, Ophélie Bau, Salim Kechiouche, Alexia Chardard, Lou Luttiau and Hafsia Herzi.

The film had its world premiere in the main competition of the 2019 Cannes Film Festival, where it was widely panned. The film also received controversy surrounding the off-set treatment of Bau. As of 2026, the film has not been released beyond its premiere.

A third and final film (Mektoub, My Love: Canto Due) wrapped filming simultaneously and remained in post-production for six years, following legal troubles with Kechiche's production company, until its world premiere at the 78th Locarno Film Festival in 2025.

== Plot ==
In 1994, Ophélie discovers she is pregnant with her lover's child even though she is engaged and due to marry her fiancé soon. With summer at a close she contemplates going to Paris to have an abortion. She and her friends decide to spend a night at a club in Sète where she has sex with her other friend.

== Cast ==
- Shaïn Boumedine as Amin
- Ophélie Bau as Ophélie
- Salim Kechiouche as Tony
- Alexia Chardard as Charlotte
- Lou Luttiau as Céline
- Hafsia Herzi as Camélia

== Production ==
The decision to split this film apart from the film Mektoub, My Love: Canto Uno (2017) caused Kechiche's producers to withdraw funds for post-production for both films in 2017. Kechiche did eventually find the funds necessary to finish both films, in part by auctioning off the Palme d'or he won for Blue Is the Warmest Colour (2013).

== Reception ==
The film was critically panned upon premiering at the 2019 Cannes Film Festival. On review aggregator website Rotten Tomatoes, the film holds an approval rating of 10% based on 21 reviews, with an average rating of 2.9/10. The website's critics consensus reads: "Joyless and distastefully photographed, Abdellatif Kechiche's second chapter in his romantic epic is too enamored with derrière to offer audiences a reason to care." Metacritic, which uses a weighted average, assigned the film a score of 10 out of 100, based on 11 critics, indicating "overwhelming dislike".

== Controversy ==
The film featured a 13-minute unsimulated sex scene where actress Ophélie Bau receives oral sex from actor Roméo de Lacour and is brought to orgasm. Shortly before the film premiered at Cannes a report broke that Kechiche pressured the actors involved to consume alcohol to finish the scene despite their reluctance to do so. Bau attended the premiere of the film but left before the screening and did not attend a press conference for the film. In 2020, she revealed that she refused to attend the screening, because she had requested Kechiche to allow her to view the sex scene in question at a private screening before the film was publicly shown, a request which he denied.

== Sequels ==
As of 2020 Mektoub, My Love: Canto Due, a third entry had reportedly finished production, however Kechiche's production company became financially insolvent leaving it stuck in the post-production phase for six years. It finally had its world premiere at the main competition of the 78th Locarno Film Festival in 2025.

A fourth planned final entry Mektoub My Love: Canto Tre was canceled.
