= Sarah Kazemy =

Iranian French actress (born 1987)

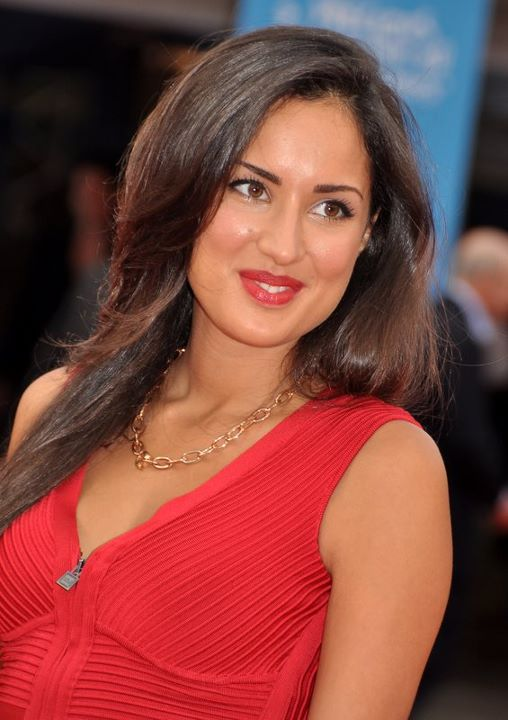
- Kazemy in 2011
- Born: 26 October 1987 (age 37); Neuilly sur Seine, Hauts-de-Seine, France
- Citizenship: Iran France
- Occupation: Actress
- Years active: 2011–present
- Height: 1.67 m (5 ft 5 1/2 in)

Sarah Kazemy (Persian: سارا کاظمی; born 26 October 1987) is an Iranian actress who born in France. She is best known for her role in the independent film Circumstance.

== Early life ==
Sarah was born in Neuilly sur Seine, France to an Iranian father and Algerian mother. She grew up in France and studied law, Arabic, German and Italian before becoming an actress.

== Career ==
She had no experience in acting when she was asked to play one of the leads in the 2011 Iranian independent film Circumstance, in which she plays a young woman who discovers her sexuality and develops a lesbian relationship. She prepared for the role by staying with her relatives in Tehran, to gain personal experience from the situation there. Soon after she was cast as the female lead in the film Kanyamakan.

== Filmography ==
Year	Title	Role
2011	Circumstance	Shireen Arshadi
2014	Kanyamakan	Aida
2014	Salaud, on t'aime	Automne Kaminsky
2016	The Bureau (TV series)	Daria Shahafi
2018	This Teacher	Sarah
2019	House of La Reine	Eva
