= For My Country =

- Directed by: Rachid Hami
- Screenplay by: Rachid Hami; Ollivier Pourriol
- Produced by: Nicolas Mauvernay
- Starring: Karim Leklou
- Cinematography: Jérôme Alméras
- Edited by: Joëlle Hache
- Music by: Dan Levy; Astrid Gomez-Montoya; Rebecca Delannet
- Release date: 2022

For My Country (French: Pour la France) is a 2022 drama film co-written and directed by Rachid Hami and starring Karim Leklou. A co-production between France and Taiwan, it premiered at the 79th edition of the Venice Film Festival.

== Plot ==
During an integration ritual at the French military school of Saint-Cyr, officer cadet Aïssa Saïdi lost his life. His older brother Ismaël, the black sheep of the family, finds himself at the forefront of the legal fight for the organization of his funeral.

== Cast ==
- Karim Leklou as Ismaël
- Shaïn Boumedine as Aïssa Saïdi
- Lubna Azabal as Nadia
- Samir Guesmi as Adil
- Laurent Lafitte as General Caillard
- Vivian Sung as Julie
- Lyes Salem as Colonel Mohamedi
- Slimane Dazi as Brahim
- Laurent Capelluto as General Ledoux
- Alicia Hava as Linda
- Hugo Becker as David
- Carole Franck as Public Prosecutor

== Production ==
The film was produced by Mizar Films, with France 2 Cinéma and Ma Studio serving as co-producers.

== Release ==
The film had its world premiere at the 79th Venice International Film Festival, in the Horizons sidebar. It was released in French cinemas on 8 February 2023.

== Reception ==
On the review aggregator website Rotten Tomatoes, 100% of 5 critics' reviews are positive, with an average rating of 7/10.
