= Savages (TV series) =

- Genre: Drama
- Written by: Sabri Louatah; Rebecca Zlotowski; Benjamin Charbit; David Elkaïm
- Directed by: Rebecca Zlotowski
- Music by: Robin Coudert
- Country of origin: France
- Original language: French
- No. of episodes: 6

Production
- Producers: Marco Cherqui; Joëy Faré; Rebecca Zlotowski
- Cinematography: Georges Lechaptois
- Editors: Mike Fromentin; Géraldine Mangenot

Original release
- Network: Canal+

Savages (French: Les Sauvages) is a French drama mini-series, which premiered on Canal+ in September 2019. A political drama, the series stars Roschdy Zem as Idder Chaouch, a politician who is on the verge of becoming the first Maghrebi person to win election as President of France, but whose campaign may be undone by family and racial politics after an assassination attempt is made on his life.

The series was created by Rebecca Zlotowski and Sabri Louatah, based on a series of novels by Louatah.

The series had its television premiere on September 23, 2019. In advance of its television premiere, two episodes of the series received a preview screening in the Primetime program at the 2019 Toronto International Film Festival.

== Cast ==
=== Main ===
- Roschdy Zem : Idder Chaouch,
- Marina Foïs : Marion Rihbeiro
- Amira Casar : Daria Tsouri Chaouch, Idder's wife
- Souheila Yacoub : Jasmine Chaouch, Idder and Daria's child
- Dali Benssalah : Fouad Nerrouche, Dounia second son
- Sofiane Zermani : Nazir Nerrouche, Dounia first son
- Shaïn Boumedine : Slim Nerrouche, Dounia third son
- Lyna Khoudri : Luna Benaïm, Rabia's daughter
- Ilies Kadri : Abdelkrim « Krim » Benaïm, Rabia'son
- Carima Amarouche : Rabia Benaïm
- Farida Rahouadj : Dounia Nerrouche

=== Recurrent ===
- Gérard Watkins : Serge Lamiel
- Jacques Bonnaffé : Doctor Lamarche-Vadel
- Franz Lang : Franz Berko
- Ariane Ascaride : Martine Guidicelli
- Jessim Mohli : Hakim Nerrouche, Nazir´son
- Neil Mohli : Marwann Nerrouche, Nazir´son
- Mehdi Djaadi : Ahmed Nerrouche
- Alassane Diong : Youssouf, Slim's love interest
- Éric Herson-Macarel : Tony Zarka
- Emmanuel Salinger : Me Szafran
- Jacques Bonnaffé : Lamarche Yadel
- Émilie de Preissac : Alix
