= The Good Teacher =

2024 film by Teddy Lussi-Modeste

- Theatrical release poster
- French: Pas de Vagues
- Directed by: Teddy Lussi-Modeste
- Written by: Teddy Lussi-Modeste; Audrey Diwan
- Produced by: Jean-Christophe Reymond; Amaury Ovise
- Starring: François Civil; Shaïn Boumedine; Toscane Duquesne; Mallory Wanecque; Bakary Kebe; Marianne Ehouman; Luna Ho Poumey; Emma Boumali; Estevan Marchenoir; Jawed Atik; Mohamed Fadiga; Agnès Hurstel; Myriam Djeljeli; Armindo Alves; Francis Leplay; Emilie Incerti-Formentini; Walid Afkir; Mustapha Abourachid; Fadily Camara
- Cinematography: Hichame Alaouié
- Edited by: Guerric Catala
- Music by: Jean-Benoît Dunckel
- Production companies: Kazak Productions; Frakas Productions
- Distributed by: Ad Vitam (France); Cinéart (Belgium)
- Release dates: 18 January 2024 (Ramdam Festival); 27 March 2024 (France); 3 April 2024 (Belgium)
- Running time: 92 minutes
- Countries: France; Belgium
- Language: French
- Budget: €3,9 million
- Box office: $3,1 million

The Good Teacher (French: Pas de Vagues, lit. 'No Waves') is a 2024 drama film directed by Teddy Lussi-Modeste from a screenplay he co-wrote with Audrey Diwan inspired by a true story that happened to the director in 2020, starring François Civil as a middle school teacher who is wrongfully accused of sexual harassment by one of his students, a teenage girl, and must fight to prove his innocence. The film is a co-production between France and Belgium and had its world premiere at the Ramdam Festival in Belgium on 18 January 2024. It was released theatrically in France by Ad Vitam on 27 March 2024, and in Belgium by Cinéart on 3 April 2024.

== Plot ==
Julien is a young, idealistic French-language teacher at a middle school (collège) in a working-class Paris suburb. Eager to connect with his students, he takes a particular interest in several of them, including the shy Leslie, offering her encouragement and informal support outside class.

When Leslie misreads one of Julien's well-meaning gestures, she writes a letter to the school's deputy principal accusing him of inappropriate behaviour toward her. The complaint sets off a chain of events Julien cannot control: Leslie's volatile older brother confronts the school and makes threats, rumours spread among the students, and the situation escalates into open conflict. Julien turns to his colleagues and to the school's administration for support, but in the face of the growing scandal, both remain silent, reluctant to take his side for fear of the reputational fallout; his own rigid, uncompromising manner, including his refusal to apologise for minor disciplinary incidents, further alienates colleagues who might otherwise have backed him.

Throughout the ordeal, Julien is also hiding his homosexuality from his students and colleagues. When an intimate video of him begins circulating around the school, his secret is exposed, adding a further, more personal dimension to the harassment he faces and amplifying the spiral of violence against him.

The film offers no clear vindication or resolution: by its end, Julien has been hardened and embittered by the experience, growing cynical and short-tempered with the very students he once tried to nurture, a transformation the film frames not as triumph but as a quiet corruption of his early idealism.

== Cast ==
- François Civil as Julien
- Shaïn Boumedine as Walid
- Bakary Kebe as Modibo
- Toscane Duquesne as Leslie
- Marianne Ehouman as Roxana
- Mallory Wanecque as Océane
- Agnès Hurstel as Laura
- Luna Ho Poumey as Erica
- Emma Boumali as Sihem
- Mohamed Fadiga as Yassine
- Jawed Atik as Mohamed-Amine
- Estevan Marchenoir as Theo
- Myriam Djeljeli as Nora
- Emilie Incerti-Formentini as Claire
- Mustapha Abourachid as Nasser
- Armindo Alves de Sa as Steve
- Francis Leplay as Musil
- Fadily Camara as Fatou
- Walid Afkir as Oumar
- Djilali Redjal as Gaspard
- Malo Chanson-Demange as Kylian
- Aaron Yapo as Glendy
- Mia Yapo as Sara
- Douglas Grauwels as Philippe

== Production ==
=== Development ===
The screenplay was co-written by Teddy Lussi-Modeste and Audrey Diwan, inspired by Lussi-Modeste's own experience when he was a French teacher at a school in Aubervilliers, in the Seine-Saint-Denis department in the northeastern suburbs of Paris, and was wrongfully accused of harassing a 13-year-old female student in 2020. "All the teachers then went on strike, there were death threats, complaints to the police station...", explained the film's producer, Jean-Christophe Reymond, on what happened to Lussi-Modeste at the time.

The film is part of the movement for teachers' freedom of speech in the face of the feeling of abandonment by their hierarchy.

The working title was originally Cueillez votre jeunesse in 2021, and it was later changed to La Plainte in 2022. It was shot under the title Pas de Vague in 2022, before being renamed again as Pas de Vagues in July 2023.

François Civil was announced in the lead role on 20 May 2022. On 11 July 2022, it was reported that the project was granted an advance on receipts by the CNC.

The Good Teacher was co-produced by France's Kazak Productions and Belgium's Frakas Productions. The score was composed by Jean-Benoît Dunckel. International sales are handled by the Paris-based company Indie Sales. The first image from the film was unveiled on 9 May 2023. The film was introduced to buyers at the 2023 Cannes Film Market with an exclusive promo-reel.

=== Filming ===
Principal photography began in Paris on 9 November 2022 and wrapped on 10 December 2022.

== Release ==
The Good Teacher had its world premiere at the Ramdam Festival in Tournai, Belgium on 18 January 2024. The film was originally set to be released theatrically in France by Ad Vitam in the fall of 2023, but the release date was pushed back to 27 March 2024. It was released in Belgium by Cinéart on 3 April 2024.

== Reception ==
=== Critical response ===
AlloCiné, a French cinema site, gave the film an average rating of 3.4/5, based on a survey of 25 French reviews.

=== Box office ===
The film sold 410.923 tickets in France after 12 weeks in theaters and has grossed $3.1 million.

== Accolades ==
Year	Award / Festival	Category	Nominee(s)	Result	Ref.
2024	International Filmfest Emden-Norderney	SCORE Bernhard Wicki Award	The Good Teacher	Nominated	
2024	International Filmfest Emden-Norderney	DGB Film Award	The Good Teacher	Nominated	
