= Hafsia Herzi =

French actress

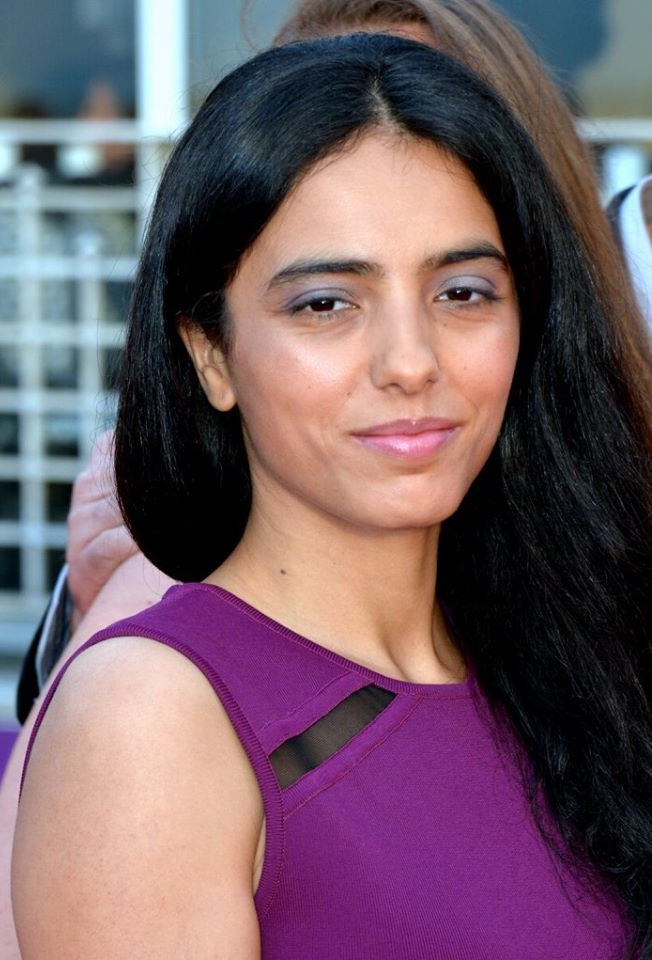
- Hafsia Herzi at the 2018 Cabourg Film Festival
- Born: 25 January 1987 (age 39); Manosque, France
- Occupations: Actress, film director
- Years active: 2007–present

Hafsia Herzi (born 25 January 1987) is a French actress, screenwriter, and director. She is best known for her debut role in the award-winning Franco-Tunisian feature The Secret of the Grain for which she won the award for most promising actress at the César Awards 2008, and the Marcello Mastroianni Award at the 64th Venice International Film Festival.

In 2025, Herzi won the César Award for Best Actress, for Borgo by Stéphane Demoustier.

== Early life ==
Herzi is of Tunisian descent from her father and Algerian from her mother, and is the youngest of a family of four children (two brothers and a sister, Dalila). After her parents' divorce, her father remarried in Algeria. Her mother lives in Marseille, where Herzi grew up.

== Career ==
=== Acting ===
Herzi's film debut is 2007's The Secret of the Grain. She has also appeared in 2011's House of Tolerance.

In 2016, Herzi starred in Sex Doll. Aside from her French film work, she has also appeared in American independent films War Story and This Teacher.

=== Filmmaking ===
In 2019, Herzi directed her first feature film, You Deserve a Lover. In June 2021, her second feature, Good Mother (Bonne Mère), was selected to compete in the Un Certain Regard section at the 2021 Cannes Film Festival. At Cannes, it won the Ensemble Prize in the Un Certain Regard section.

== Personal life ==
Herzi has a son with her partner, cyclist Nacer Bouhanni.

In 2017, Herzi had an altercation with a chauffeur after the latter declined her request for a detour. According to Herzi, the chauffeur had previously made sexual innuendos alluding to nude scenes in her films and accusing her of violating religious morals. She was cleared of charges of insult by the court of first instance, but the Court of Appeal of Paris found her guilty of non-public racial insult.

== Selected filmography ==
=== As filmmaker ===
Year	Title	Notes
2019	You Deserve a Lover	Also Actress
2021	Good Mother	
2022	La Cour	TV Movie
2025	The Little Sister	

=== As actress ===
Year	Title	Role	Notes
2007	The Secret of the Grain	Rym	César Award for Most Promising Actress; Lumière Award for Most Promising Actress; Marcello Mastroianni Award; Shooting Stars Award
2008	Dawn of the World	Zahra	
2008	A Man and His Dog	Leïla	
2009	The King of Escape	Curly Durandot	
2009	Buried Secrets	Aïcha	
2010	The Rabbi's Cat	Zlebia	Voice
2011	Jimmy Rivière	Sonia	
2011	House of Tolerance	Samira	
2011	The Source	Loubna Esmeralda	
2012	The Inheritance	Hajar	
2013	Exit Marrakech	Karima	
2013	The Marchers	Monia	
2013	On My Way	Jeanne	
2014	Le Sac de farineh	Sarah	
2014	Certifiée Halal		
2014	War Story	Hafsia	
2015	Par accident	Amra	
2016	Sex Doll	Virginie	
2017	Des plans sur la comète	Inès	
2017	Of Skin and Men	Amel	
2017	Mektoub, My Love: Canto Uno	Camélia	
2018	Féminin plurielles	Hafsia Chouchane	
2018	Black Tide		
2018	Le Banc		
2018	This Teacher		
2019	You Deserve a Lover	Lila	Also as director
2019	Mektoub My Love: Intermezzo	Camélia	
2019	Persona non grata	Iris	
2021	Madame Claude	Nadège	
2021	À l'ombre des filles	Jess	
2022	Three Nights a Week	Samia	
2022	La Gravité	Sabrina	
2023	The Rapture	Lydia	
2023	Borgo	Melissa	César Award for Best Actress
2024	My New Friends		World premiere at the 74th Berlin International Film Festival
2026	The Birthday Party	Nora	
