= Standing Tall (film) =

2015 film

- Film poster
- Directed by: Emmanuelle Bercot
- Written by: Emmanuelle Bercot; Marcia Romano
- Produced by: François Kraus; Denis Pineau-Valencienne
- Starring: Catherine Deneuve; Rod Paradot; Benoît Magimel; Sara Forestier; Diane Rouxel; Élizabeth Mazev; Anne Suarez; Christophe Meynet; Martin Loizillon
- Cinematography: Guillaume Schiffman
- Edited by: Julien Leloup
- Music by: Éric Neveux
- Production companies: France 2 Cinéma; Les Films du Kiosque
- Distributed by: Wild Bunch Distribution
- Release dates: 13 May 2015 (Cannes); 13 May 2015 (France)
- Running time: 119 minutes
- Country: France
- Language: French
- Budget: $6 million
- Box office: $5.2 million

Standing Tall (French: La Tête haute) is a 2015 French drama film directed by Emmanuelle Bercot. It was selected to open the 2015 Cannes Film Festival. The film received eight nominations at the 41st César Awards and won two, Best Supporting Actor for Benoît Magimel and Most Promising Actor for Rod Paradot.

== Cast ==
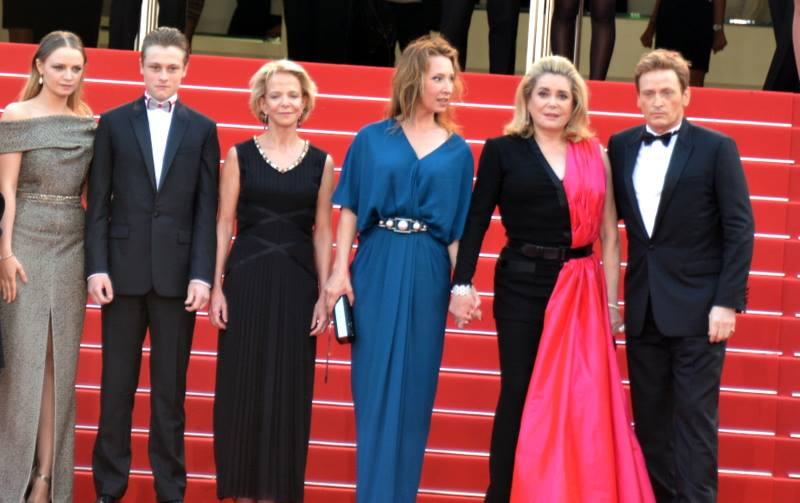
Director and stars at the 2015 Cannes Film Festival.

- Catherine Deneuve as judge Florence Blaque
- Rod Paradot as Malony
  - Enzo Trouillet as Malony (6-year-old)
- Benoît Magimel as Yann
- Sara Forestier as Séverine
- Diane Rouxel as Tess
- Catherine Salée as Gladys Vatier
- Élizabeth Mazev as Claudine
- Anne Suarez as JDC director
- Christophe Meynet as Mr. Robin
- Lise Lamétrie as The first clerk
- Martin Loizillon as The public prosecutor
- Michel Masiero as The grandfather

== Accolades ==
Principal Photography began 21 July 2014 and concluded on 17 September 2014

Award / Film Festival	Category	Recipients and nominees	Result
César Awards	Best Film		Nominated
César Awards	Best Director	Emmanuelle Bercot	Nominated
César Awards	Best Actress	Catherine Deneuve	Nominated
César Awards	Best Supporting Actor	Benoît Magimel	Won
César Awards	Best Supporting Actress	Sara Forestier	Nominated
César Awards	Most Promising Actor	Rod Paradot	Won
César Awards	Most Promising Actress	Diane Rouxel	Nominated
César Awards	Best Original Screenplay	Emmanuelle Bercot and Marcia Romano	Nominated
Lumière Awards	Best Male Revelation	Rod Paradot	Won
Prix Jacques Prévert du Scénario	Best Original Screenplay	Emmanuelle Bercot and Marcia Romano	Nominated
