= Ophélie Bau =

French actress

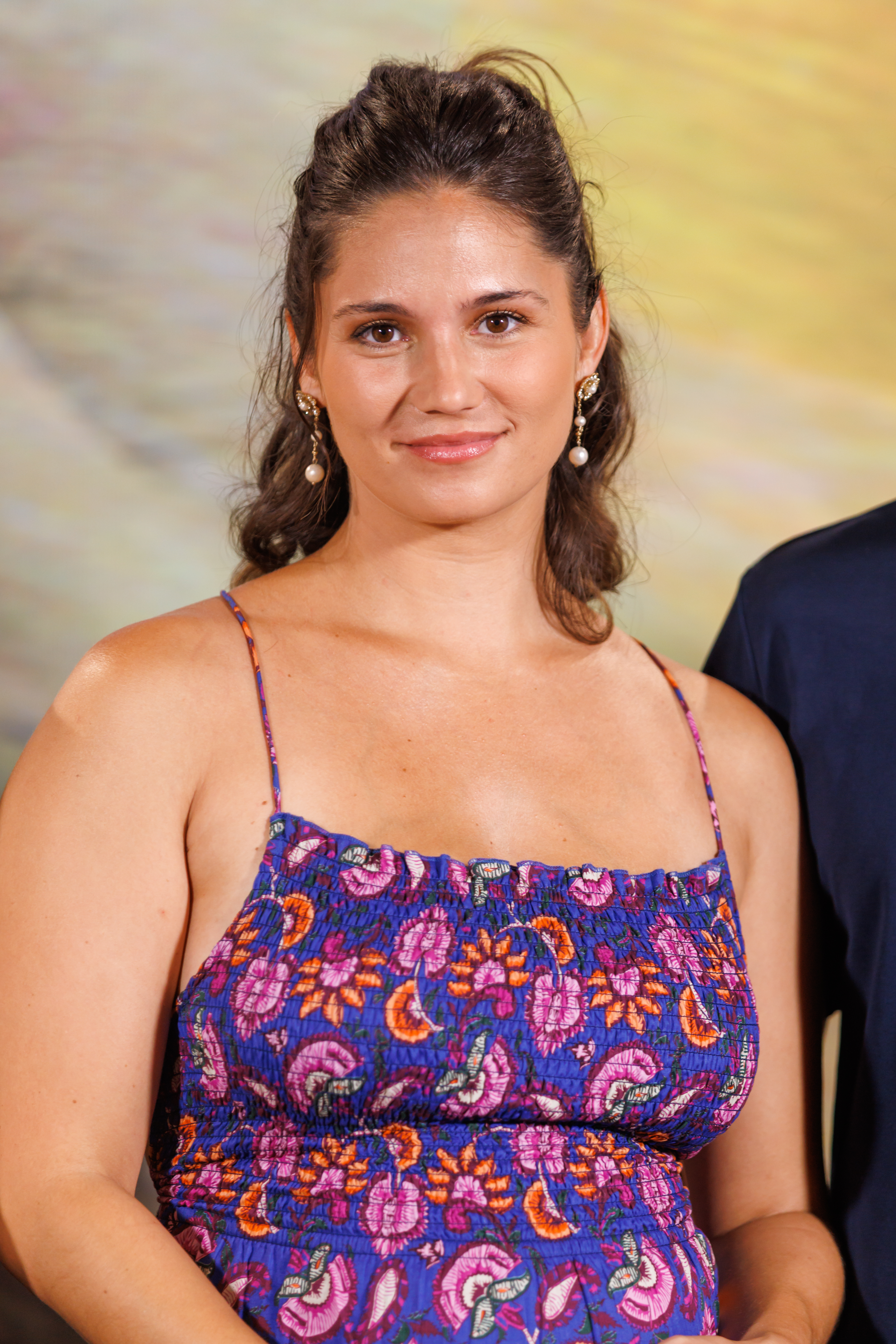
- Bau in 2025
- Born: 29 July 1992 (age 33); Besançon, France
- Occupation: Actress

Ophélie Bau is a French actress best known for her roles in Abdellatif Kechiche's trilogy of films Mektoub, My Love: Canto Uno (2017), Mektoub, My Love: Intermezzo (2019) and Mektoub, My Love: Canto Due (2025).

== Early life ==
Bau was born Ophélie Baufle in Besançon, where she was crowned Miss of this city in 2014.

== Career ==
Bau made her acting debut in the 2017 film Mektoub, My Love: Canto Uno. While the film received mixed reviews Bau's performance was widely praised. She won the 2019 Lumière Award for Best Female Revelation for her role in the film and was nominated in the same category at the César awards.

Bau's next movie was the 2019 sequel to Mektoub, Mektoub, My Love: Intermezzo. Shortly before the film premiered at the Cannes Film Festival in 2019 news broke that the film featured an unsimulated sex scene between her and a co-star, which the two had been pressured into filming by the film's director Abdellatif Kechiche. It was also revealed that Bau and her co-star had been intoxicated during the filming of the scene, also due to pressure from the director. Bau attended the premiere of the film but walked out of the screening and did not attend a press conference for the film. In 2020 in an interview she revealed she walked away from the premiere because she had asked Kechiche to allow her to view the sex scene in private before it was screened in public, a request which he denied.

As of 2024 Bau has appeared in another two French feature films, Vaurien and Fires in the Dark.

== Filmography ==
=== Film ===
- 2018: Mektoub, My Love: Canto Uno, directed by Abdellatif Kechiche : Ophélie
- 2019: Mektoub, My Love: Intermezzo, directed by Abdellatif Kechiche : Ophélie
- 2020: Grace (short film), directed by Marion Filloque et Ophélie Bau : Grace
- 2020 : Vaurien, directed by Peter Dourountzis : Maya
- 2020 : Fake (short film), directed by Lou-Brice Léonard : Sarah
- 2020 : Des feux dans la nuit, directed by Dominique Lienhard : Maya
- 2021: Free Like Air d'Abdolreza Kahani : Amber
- 2021 : Loving (short film), directed by Thibaut Buccellato :
- 2021 : La Vie d'avant (short film), directed by Anaïs Deban : Délia
- 2023: Le Marchand de sable, directed by Steve Achiepo : Aurore
- 2023 : La Grande Ourse (short film), directed by Anthony Bajon : Alexia
- 2023 : La sirène se marie (short film), directed by Achraf Arjaoui : Jeanne
- 2025: Mektoub, My Love: Canto Due, directed by Abdellatif Kechiche : Ophélie

=== Television ===
- 2023 : B.R.I., by Jérémie Guez : Vanessa
- 2024 : Fortune de France, by Christopher Thompson : Franchou

=== Music video ===
- 2021: Disiz: Casino
