= The Names of Love =

2010 film by Michel Leclerc

- Film poster
- Directed by: Michel Leclerc
- Written by: Michel Leclerc; Baya Kasmi
- Produced by: Antoine Rein; Fabrice Goldstein; Caroline Adrian
- Starring: Jacques Gamblin; Sara Forestier
- Cinematography: Vincent Mathias
- Edited by: Nathalie Hubert
- Music by: Jérôme Bensoussan; David Euverte
- Production companies: Delante Films; Karé Productions; TF1 Droits Audiovisuels
- Distributed by: UGC Distribution
- Release date: 10 July 2010
- Running time: 100 minutes
- Country: France
- Language: French
- Budget: $2.5 million
- Box office: $6.1 million

The Names of Love (French: Le Nom des gens) is a 2010 French romantic comedy film directed by Michel Leclerc, written by Leclerc and Baya Kasmi, and produced by Antoine Rein, Fabrice Goldstein and Caroline Adrian.

The film recorded 764,821 admissions in Europe. It was awarded two César Awards in 2011, including Best Actress for Sara Forestier and Best Original Screenplay.

== Plot ==
The film portrays the life of a Parisien scatter-brained and free-spirited, young left-wing activist who sleeps with her political opposites in order to convert them to her politics, until she meets her match. It includes references to the Holocaust, the Algerian War and child sexual abuse.

== Cast ==
- Jacques Gamblin as Arthur Martin
- Sara Forestier as Bahia Benmahmoud
- Zinedine Soualem as Mohamed Benmahmoud
- Carole Franck as Cécile Delivet Benmahmoud
- Jacques Boudet as Lucien Martin
- Michèle Moretti as Annette Martin
- Zakariya Gouram as Hassan Hassini
- Antoine Michel as photographer

The former French Prime Minister Lionel Jospin makes a cameo appearance.

== Production ==
In the scene one in which Forestier wearing only boots walks through the Paris streets and Metro, most of the people she encounters were unaware that a movie was being shot. The film was largely shot in Bagnolet (Seine-Saint-Denis).

== Reception ==
The Names of Love received generally positive reviews. Rotten Tomatoes gives the film an aggregate score of 72%, based on 53 reviews, with an average rating of 6.7/10. The film also has a score of 62 out of 100 on Metacritic, based on 19 reviews.
