= J'attendrai le suivant =

J'attendrai le suivant... (I'll Wait for the Next One...)
- Directed by: Philippe Orreindy
- Written by: Thomas Gaudin; Philippe Orreindy
- Produced by: Eric Pattedoie; Caroline Perchaud
- Starring: Sophie Forte; Thomas Gaudin; Pascal Casanova
- Cinematography: Eric Genillier
- Edited by: Anne Aravecchi
- Music by: Alain Marna
- Production company: La Boîte
- Distributed by: Mouviz (France)
- Release date: September 29, 2002
- Running time: 4 minutes
- Country: France
- Language: French

J'attendrai le suivant... (I'll Wait for the Next One...) is a 2002 French short film directed by Philippe Orreindy. Lasting only four minutes, the film takes place almost entirely on a metro train.

The film was released in France in September 2002, with subsequent screenings at various film festivals followed by releases around the world. At the 75th Academy Awards, the film was nominated for Best Short Film, but did not win.

== Synopsis ==
A man on a crowded metro train announces that he has something important to share with the passengers in his car. Initially, it seems the other riders assume he is a typical train performer. However, the man introduces himself as Antoine, 29 years old, claiming to be well-off, educated, and athletic. He explains that he is tired of a lonely, monotonous life and is seeking love and someone to share meaningful moments with.

Following a lengthy speech—and a brief argument with another male passenger—he invites any interested women to disembark at the next stop. A woman who had earlier been shown watching an affectionate couple with a sense of longing is now seen smiling throughout Antoine's speech. As the train slows, she stands and exits, clearly expecting him to follow.

As she waits on the platform, visibly excited, Antoine remains onboard and, just before the doors close, tells her, "Miss, it was only a skit..." The train departs, leaving her alone and visibly dejected. The screen fades to black, and Antoine is heard thanking the passengers for watching before asking for money, revealing that he is not who he claimed to be, but rather a beggar performing for donations.

== Cast ==
- Sophie Forte - La jeune femme
- Thomas Gaudin - L'homme
- Pascal Casanova - Le comparse

== Awards and nominations ==
| Award | Category | Status |
|---|---|---|
| Academy Awards | Best Short Film, Live Action Philippe Orreindy, Thomas Gaudin | Nominated |
| Avignon / New York Film Festival | Best Short - France Philippe Orreindy | Won |
| Capalbio Cinema | Best Creative Idea Philippe Orreindy | Won |
| César Awards, France | Best Short Film (Meilleur court métrage) Philippe Orreindy | Nominated |
| Drama Short Film Festival | International Philippe Orreindy | Won |
| European Film Awards | Best Short Film Philippe Orreindy | Won |
| Flanders International Film Festival | Best European Short Film Philippe Orreindy | Won |
| Huesca Film Festival | Critics Award - Special Mention Philippe Orreindy | Won |
| Huesca Film Festival | Special Jury Award Philippe Orreindy | Won |
| Huesca Film Festival | Youth Jury Award - Special Mention Philippe Orreindy | Won |
| Montréal World Film Festival | First Prize (Short Film) Philippe Orreindy | Won |
| Namur International Festival of French-Speaking Film | Best Short Film) Philippe Orreindy | Nominated |
| São Paulo International Film Festival | Audience Award - Best Short Film Philippe Orreindy | Won |
| Valladolid International Film Festival | FIPRESCI Prize Philippe Orreindy | Won |
| Valladolid International Film Festival | Short Film Philippe Orreindy | Won |
