= Abdellatif Kechiche =

Tunisian-French filmmaker (born 1960)

- عبد اللطيف كشيش
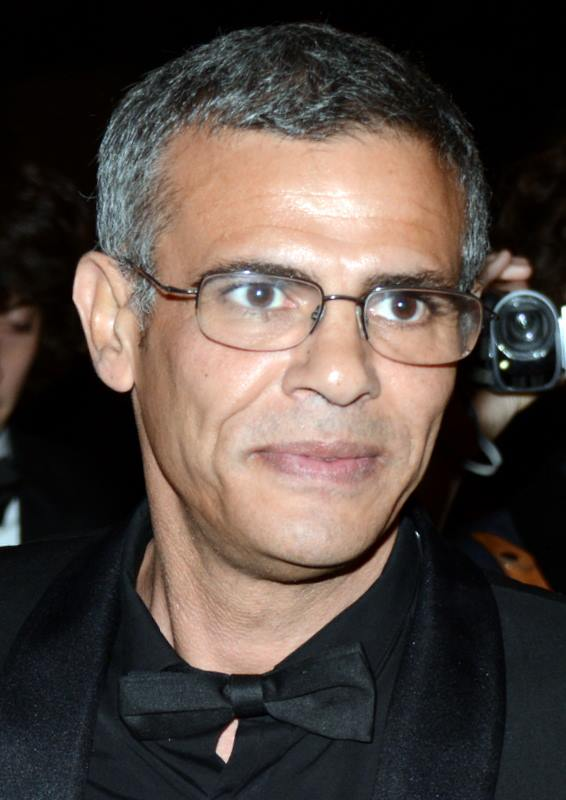
- Kechiche at the 2013 Cannes Film Festival.
- Born: 7 December 1960 (age 65); Tunis, Tunisia
- Citizenship: Tunisian, French
- Occupations: Filmmaker and former actor
- Years active: 1982–present

Abdellatif Kechiche (French: [abdɛlatif keʃiʃ]; Arabic: عبد اللطيف كشيش, born 7 December 1960), also known as Abdel Kechiche, is a Tunisian-French filmmaker and former actor. Known for his naturalistic style, his films usually explore the Arabic immigrant communities in contemporary France.

He has won several César Awards, including Best Film for Games of Love and Chance (2003) and The Secret of the Grain (2007), and the Palme d'Or for his erotic-romance film Blue Is the Warmest Colour (2013) at the 66th Cannes Film Festival.

== Early life ==
Born in Tunis, Tunisia, Kechiche emigrated with his parents to Nice, France when he was six years old. Passionate about theater, he took drama classes at the Antibes Conservatory. He performed several shows on the Cote d’Azur, most notably a play by Federico Garcia Lorca in 1978 and a play by Eduardo Manet the following year. He was equally dedicated to directing as he was to performing in theater; he presented The Architect at the Avignon Festival in 1981.

== Career ==
In film, his first acting role was in Abdelkrim Bahioul's Mint Tea, where he played a young Algerian immigrant who moved to Paris to make his fortune.

André Téchiné hired him in 1987 in The Innocents where he played a gigolo alongside Sandrine Bonnaire and Jean-Claude Brialy. Thanks to Nouri Bouzid’s film Bezness, he won the best male actor award at the Namur Festival in 1992.

In 2003, he wrote and directed, Games of Love and Chance (L’Esquive), with amateur actors and an extremely limited budget. The film follows a group of high school students from the Parisian suburbs who rehearse a Marivaux play for their French class. The film was an honorable success for an author's film without known actors; it was hailed by critics as one of the biggest French films of the year 2004. The film won four awards at the 30th César Awards in 2005: Best Film, Best Director, and Best Original Screenplay or Adaptation. Sara Forestier a lead actress won the César for most promising actress for her role in Games of Love and Chance.

As an actor, his introduction to most English-speaking audiences was starring as Ashade the taxi driver in the 2005 psychological thriller Sorry, Haters, an "official selection" in both the Toronto International and American Film Institute's film festivals.

He was decorated by the government of Zine El Abidine Ben Ali in 2005 and in 2008.

He then directed The Secret of the Grain (La Graine et le mulet) in 2006, which evokes the journey of a worker of Maghrebian origin who wants to establish a restaurant in the port of Sete as an inheritance for his family, but meets French bureaucratic opposition. The film had its world premiere in the main competition of the 64th Venice International Film Festival, where it won the Special Jury Prize, the film also received the FIPRESCI Prize, the Louis Delluc Prize and the César Awards for Best Film and Best Director.

Kechiche's fourth film Black Venus (Vénus Noire) had its world premiere in the main competition of the 67th Venice International Film Festival in 2010. The film follows the life of Saartjie Baartman, a Khoikhoi woman from the early 19th century who was exhibited and objectified in Europe for her voluptuous figure. The film's critical reception was positive, despite only receiving only one nomination at the 37th César Awards.

His 2013 film Blue Is the Warmest Colour (La Vie d'Adèle – Chapitres 1 & 2) won the Palme d'Or and the FIPRESCI Prize at the 2013 Cannes Film Festival. Shortly after, a controversy erupted about Kechiche's work methods; technicians on the film accused him of harassment, unpaid overtime and violations of labour laws. The two lead actresses, Léa Seydoux and Adèle Exarchopoulos, who were also awarded the Palme d'Or, had complained about Kechiche's behavior during the shooting but later, in an extensive interview, claimed that although he was difficult to work with it had been worth it, as he was a great filmmaker. The film also won Best International Independent Film at the British Independent Film Awards in 2013.

His follow-up film was Mektoub, My Love: Canto Uno (2017), the first chapter of a trilogy. The film had its world premiere in the main competition of the 74th Venice International Film Festival to mixed reviews. Shortly before its Venice premiere, Kechiche announced he was auctioning off the Palme d'or he had received for Blue Is the Warmest Colour in order to raise funds to finish the film. Producers for Mektoub had planned to withdraw funds during its post-production after discovering that Kechiche split Mektoub into two or three films. Kechiche did find the funds necessary to finish the film and succeeded in splitting the film with two sequels.

In 2019, Mektoub, My Love: Intermezzo had its world premiere in the main competition of the 2019 Cannes Film Festival, where it was widely panned by critics and the audience. The film featured a 13-minute unsimulated sex scene where actress Ophélie Bau receives oral sex from actor Roméo de Lacour and is brought to orgasm. Shortly before the film premiered at Cannes, a report broke that Kechiche pressured the actors involved to consume alcohol to finish the scene despite their reluctance to do so. Bau attended the premiere of the film but left before the screening and did not attend a press conference for the film. In 2020, she revealed that she refused to attend the screening, because she had requested Kechiche to allow her to view the sex scene in question at a private screening before the film was publicly shown, a request which he denied. As of 2025, due to the controversy surrounding the off-set treatment of Bau and Kechiche's production company becoming financially insolvent, the film remains unreleased worldwide.

In 2025, the third and final film of the trilogy, Mektoub, My Love: Canto Due, which had wrapped filming simultaneously with Intermezzo but remained on post-production for six years following Kechiche's production company's legal troubles, had its world premiere in the main competition of the 78th Locarno Film Festival. It was well received by the French press. Even though Kechiche was absent from the film's premiere due to a recent stroke, the main cast and line producer Riccardo Marchegiani attended the press Q&A session. When asked about the Intermezzo (2019) off-set allegations, Bau declined any comment on it, while other cast members defended the filmmaker and the film.

== Personal life ==
Since 1992, Kechiche has lived with Ghalya Lacroix.

=== Allegation of sexual assault ===
In October 2018, Kechiche was accused of sexual assault by an actress, whose name was withheld from official reports. French prosecutors later dropped the probe, citing insufficient evidence.

== Filmography ==
=== Feature films ===
Year	English title	Original title	Notes
2001	Poetical Refugee	La Faute à Voltaire	
2003	Games of Love and Chance	L'Esquive	César Award for Best Director
2007	The Secret of the Grain	La graine et le mulet	César Award for Best Director; Louis Delluc Prize; Lumière Award for Best Director
2010	Black Venus	Vénus noire	
2013	Blue Is the Warmest Colour	La Vie d'Adèle – Chapitres 1 & 2	Palme d'Or (shared with the film's actresses, Léa Seydoux and Adèle Exarchopoulos); FIPRESCI Prize (2013 Cannes Film Festival); Best International Independent Film (2013 British Independent Film Awards); Louis Delluc Prize; Lumière Award for Best Director
2017	Mektoub, My Love: Canto Uno		Also Producer
2019	Mektoub, My Love: Intermezzo		Also Producer
2025	Mektoub, My Love: Canto Due		Also Producer

=== Acting credits ===
Year	Title	Role	Notes
1982	Un balcon sur les Andes		Credited as Abdel Kechiche
1984	Le Thé à la menthe	Hamou	Credited as Abdel Kechiche
1987	Les Innocents	Saïd	Credited as Abdel Kechiche
1992	Bezness	Roufa	Credited as Abdel Kechiche
1992	Un vampire au paradis	Blondin	Credited as Abdel Kechiche
1996	Marteau rouge		Credited as Abdel Kechiche
2002	The Magic Box	Raouf	
2005	Sorry, Haters	Ashade Mouhana	
