= Games of Love and Chance =

- Directed by: Abdellatif Kechiche
- Written by: Abdellatif Kechiche; Ghalia Lacroix
- Produced by: Jacques Ouaniche
- Starring: Osman Elkharraz; Sara Forestier; Sabrina Ouazani
- Cinematography: Lubomir Bakchev
- Edited by: Antonella Bevenja; Ghalia Lacroix
- Distributed by: Rézo Films
- Release date: November 25, 2003
- Running time: 117 minutes (France); 123 minutes (US)
- Country: France
- Language: French
- Budget: $1.3 million
- Box office: $2.8 million

Games of Love and Chance (French: L'Esquive) is a 2003 French drama film directed by Abdellatif Kechiche and starring Sara Forestier. It won the César Award for Best Film, Best Director, Best Original Screenplay or Adaptation and Most Promising Actress.

The film was shot in Seine-Saint-Denis in 6 weeks in October and November 2002.

== Synopsis ==
A group of teenagers from the housing projects of the Paris suburbs practice a passage from the play The Game of Love and Chance by Marivaux for their French class. Abdelkrim, or Krimo, who initially does not act in the play, falls in love with Lydia. In order to try to seduce her, he accepts the role of Arlequin and joins the rehearsal. But his timidness and awkwardness keeps him from participating in the play as well as succeeding with Lydia.

== Cast ==
Other than Sara Forestier, many of the actors in this film were inexperienced in cinema and recruited specifically for the film.

- Osman Elkharraz as Krimo
- Sara Forestier as Lydia
- Sabrina Ouazani as Frida
- Nanou Benhamou as Nanou
- Hafet Ben-Ahmed as Fathi, Krimo's best friend
- Aurélie Ganito as Magalie, the girlfriend of Krimo (broke up near the beginning of the film)
- Carole Franck as The French Professor
- Hajar Hamlili as Zina
- Rachid Hami as Rachid / Arlequin
- Meryem Serbah as the mother of Krimo
- Hanane Mazouz as Hanane
- Sylvain Phan as Slam
- Olivier Loustau, Rosalie Symon, Patrick Kodjo Topou, Lucien Tipaldi as the police
- Reinaldo Wong as The couturier
- Nu Du, Ki Hong, Brigitte Bellony-Riskwait, Ariyapitipum Naruemol, Fatima Lahbi

== Reception ==
Games of Love and Chance garnered a 79% approval rating on Rotten Tomatoes and a 71/100 on Metacritic.
