= Sara Forestier =

French actress

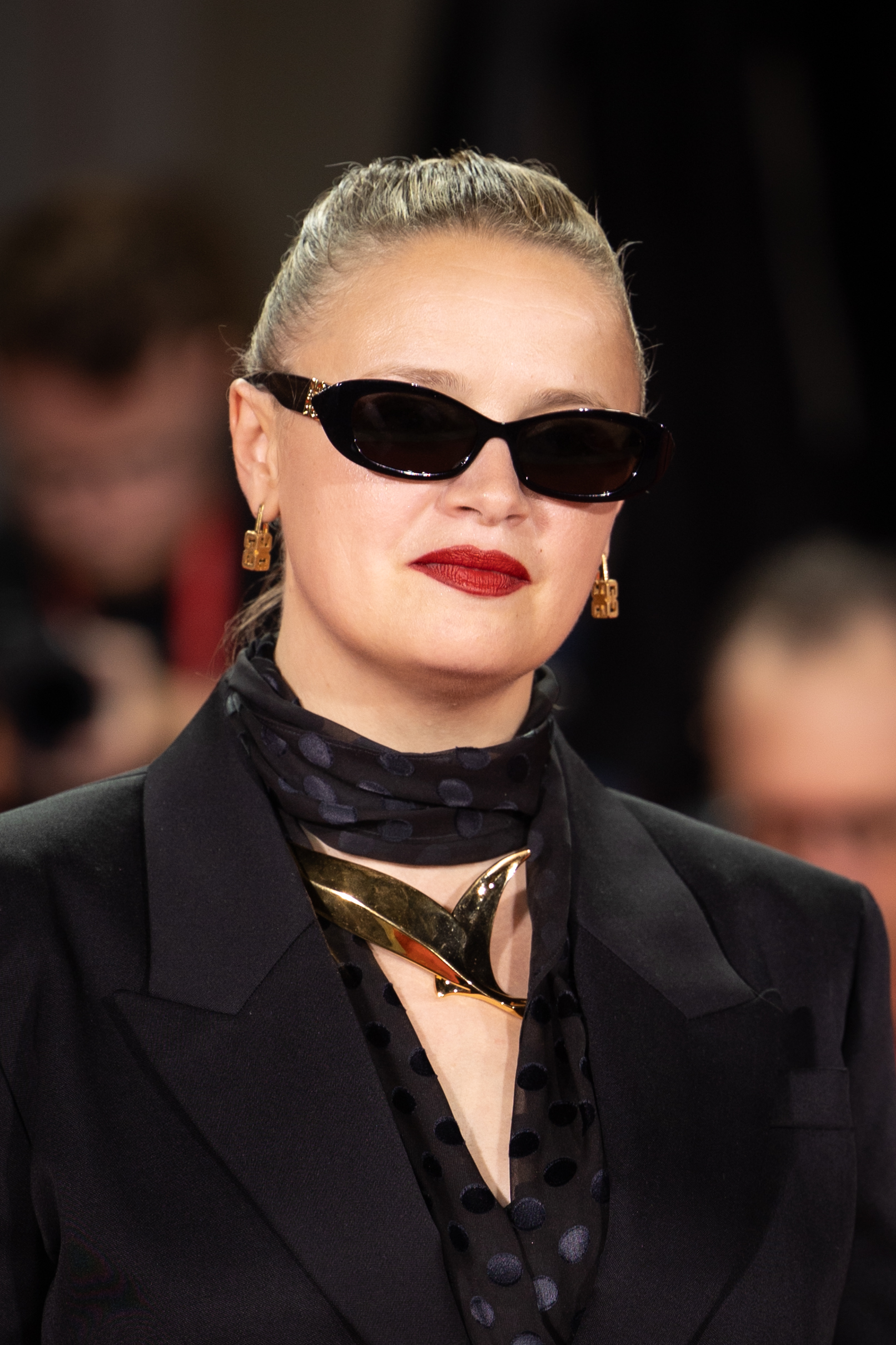
- Forestier in 2024
- Born: 4 October 1986 (age 39); Copenhagen, Denmark
- Occupations: Actress, film director, screenwriter
- Years active: 2001–present

Sara Forestier (born 4 October 1986) is a French actress, film director and screenwriter.

== Life and career ==
Forestier was born in Denmark to French parents working there as ambassadors for the French Foreign Legion. She began her film career in 2001.

She received a César Award for Most Promising Actress for her performance in Games of Love and Chance (2003). She won the César Award for Best Actress in 2011 for her performance in Le Nom des gens (2009).

Forestier resides in Paris.

== Selected filmography ==
=== As actress ===
Year	Title	Role	Notes
2001	Les Fantômes de Louba	Girl #2	
2002	La Guerre à Paris		
2003	Quelques jours entre nous	Alice	TV movie
2004	Games of Love and Chance	Lydia	César Award for Most Promising Actress
2004	À cran, deux ans après		TV movie
2005	Le courage d'aimer	Salomé	
2005	How Much Do You Love Me?	Muguet	
2005	Hell	Hell	
2006	Asterix and the Vikings	Abba	Voice
2006	A Few Days in September	Orlando	
2006	Perfume: The Story of a Murderer	Jeanne	
2007	To Each His Own Cinema	The Cinema's Till Girl	Sketch Cinéma érotique
2008	Sandrine in the Rain	Sandrine	
2008	Revivre	Hannah Goldenberg	TV miniseries
2009	Humains	Nadia	
2009	Wild Grass	Élodie	
2009	Victor	Alice	
2010	The Names of Love	Bahia Benmahmoud	César Award for Best Actress; Nominated—Globes de Cristal Award for Best Actress
2010	Gainsbourg: A Heroic Life	France Gall	
2012	Paris by Night	Laurence Deray	
2012	Pirate TV	Clara	
2013	Suzanne	Suzanne Merevsky	Nominated—César Award for Best Actress
2013	Love Is the Perfect Crime	Annie	
2013	Love Battles	Elle	
2014	Yellowbird	Delf	
2015	Standing Tall	Séverine	Nominated—César Award for Best Supporting Actress
2017	Primaire	Florence Mautret	
2017	M	Lila	Nominated—Globes de Cristal Award for Best Actress
2019	Disparition inquiétante	Maya Rosetti	TV movie
2019	Oh Mercy!		
2019	The Border		
2020	Working Girls		
2021	Playlist	Sophie	
2024	Three Friends	Rebecca Maillard	

=== As filmmaker ===
Year	Title	Credited as		Notes
Year	Title	Director	Screenwriter	Notes
2008	Un, deux, toi	Yes		Short film
2009	T Moi	Yes		Short film
2017	M	Yes	Yes	

== Other awards ==
- 2004: Prix Suzanne Bianchetti
- 2004: Best Actress for Games of Love and Chance at Mons International Festival of Love Films
- 2005: Shooting Stars Award
- 2005: Best Female Newcomer for Games of Love and Chance at Étoiles d'or

== Decorations ==
- Chevalier of the Order of Arts and Letters (2016)
