= List of French films of 2021 =

A list of French-produced films scheduled for release in 2021.

== Films ==
Title	Director	Cast	Notes	Release date	Ref
The Accusation	Yvan Attal	Ben Attal, Suzanne Jouannet, Charlotte Gainsbourg, Mathieu Kassovitz, Pierre Arditi, Audrey Dana, Benjamin Lavernhe, Judith Chemla		December 1, 2021	
Aline	Valérie Lemercier	Valérie Lemercier, Roc Lafortune, Danielle Fichaud, Sylvain Marcel			
Arthur Rambo	Laurent Cantet	Rabah Nait Oufella, Antoine Reinartz			
Beautiful Minds (Presque)	Bernard Campan, Alexandre Jollien	Bernard Campan, Alexandre Jollien			
Benedetta	Paul Verhoeven	Virginie Efira, Lambert Wilson, Charlotte Rampling			
Bigger Than Us	Flore Vasseur	Melati Wijsen, Xiuhtezcatl Martinez, Memory Banda	Documentary	September 22, 2021	
The Crusade (La Croisade)	Louis Garrel	Louis Garrel, Laetitia Casta, Joseph Engel			
Everything Went Fine (Tout s'est bien passé)	François Ozon	Sophie Marceau, André Dussollier, Géraldine Pailhas, Charlotte Rampling			
A Fishy Business in Saint-Pierre et Miquelon (Ça tourne à Saint-Pierre et Miquelon)	Christian Monnier				
Happening (L'événement)	Audrey Diwan	Anamaria Vartolomei, Luàna Bajrami		November 24, 2021	
The Hill Where Lionesses Roar	Luàna Bajrami	Flaka Latifi, Urate Shabani, Era Balaj			
Kaamelott: The First Chapter	Alexandre Astier				
The Last Chapter (La dernière séance)	Gianluca Matarrese	Bernard Guyonnet	Winner of the Queer Lion at the 78th Venice International Film Festival		
Lost Illusions	Xavier Giannoli				
Moon, 66 Questions	Jacqueline Lentzou	Sofia Kokkali, Lazaros Georgakopoulos	French-Greek coproduction		
Oxygene	Alexandre Aja	Mélanie Laurent, Mathieu Amalric, Malik Zidi			
Paris, 13th District	Jacques Audiard	Jehnny Beth, Noémie Merlant			
Petite Maman	Céline Sciamma	Joséphine Sanz, Gabrielle Sanz, Stéphane Varupenne, Nina Meurisse			
A Place Called Dignity	Matías Rojas Valencia	Salvador Insunza, Hanns Zischler, Amalia Kassai, Noa Westermeyer, Luis Dubó, David Gaete, Alex Gorlich, Alejandro Goic, Giannina Fruttero, Claudia Cabezas, Paulina Urrutia, Vivian Mahler, Philippa Zu Knyphausen, Gerardo Naumann, Ignacio Solari, Christiane Diaz, Victoria De Gregorio	An international co-production with Chile, Colombia, Argentina and Germany		
Presidents	Anne Fontaine	Jean Dujardin, Grégory Gadebois, Doria Tillier, Pascale Arbillot		June 30, 2021	
Sentinelle	Julien Leclerq	Olga Kurylenko, Marilyn Lima, Michel Nabokoff			
Titane	Julia Ducournau	Vincent Lindon, Agathe Rouselle, Garance Marillier		July 14, 2021	
La Vengeance au Triple Galop	Alex Lutz & Arthur Sanigou	Audrey Lamy, Alex Lutz, Guillaume Gallienne, Leïla Bekhti, Gaspard Ulliel, Marion Cotillard	TV film	October 4, 2021	
The Witches of the Orient (Les Sorcières de l’Orient)	Julien Faraut			July 28, 2021	
Zero Fucks Given	Emmanuel Marre & Julie Lecoustre	Adèle Exarchopoulos			
