= Kabugho =

Kabugho is a surname. Notable people with this surname include:

- Florence Kabugho, Ugandan politician and journalist
- Rebecca Kabugho (born 1994), Congolese activist
