= Philippe Carcassonne =

French film producer

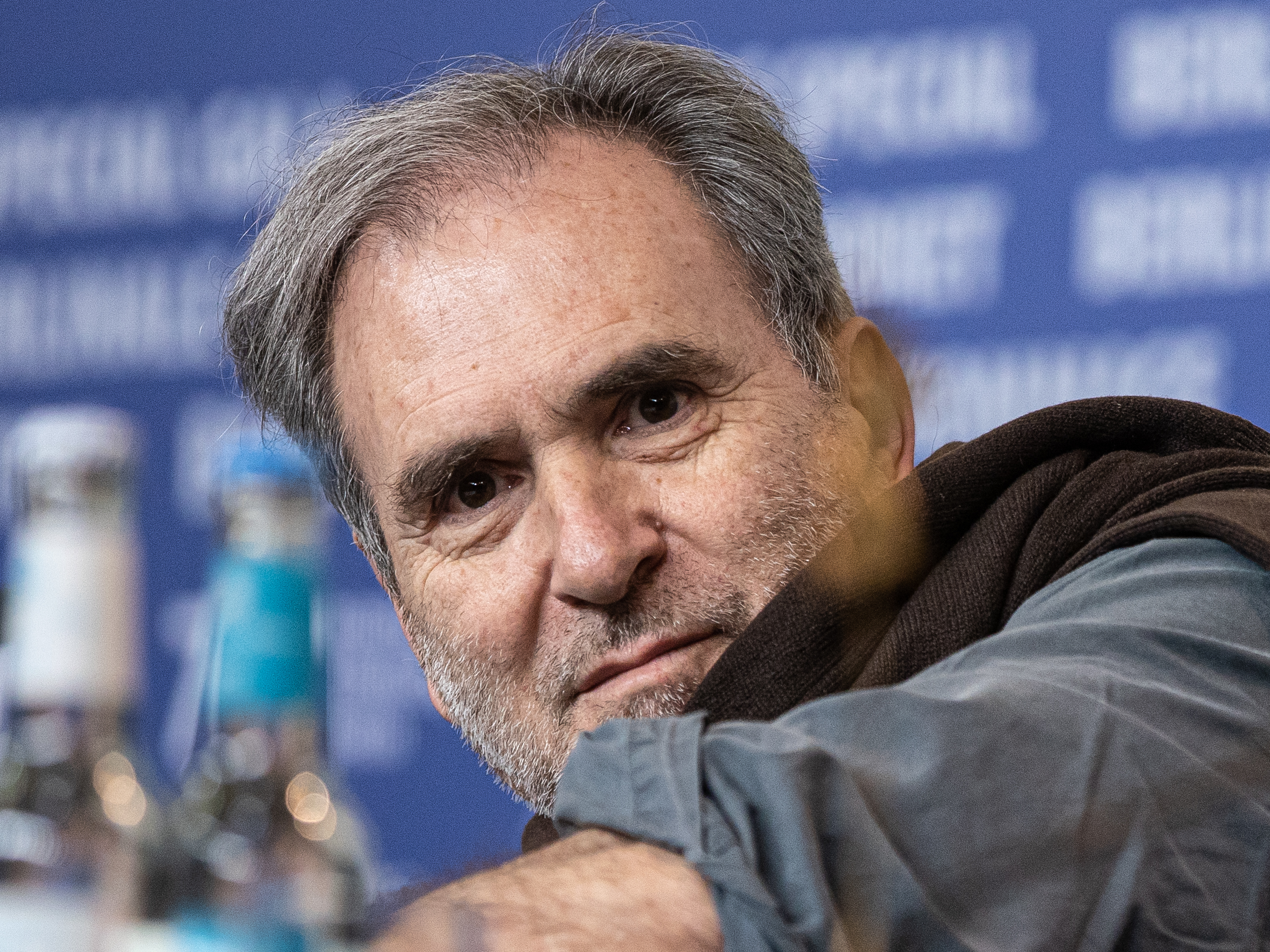
- Carcassonne in 2020
- Occupation: Film producer
- Years active: 1986–present
- Spouse: Anne Fontaine (m. 1994)

Philippe Carcassonne is a French film producer. He is a frequent producer of films directed by Patrice Leconte, Benoît Jacquot, and his wife Anne Fontaine. He was nominated for an Academy Award and two BAFTA Film Awards for producing The Father (2020).

== Career ==
After obtaining a degree in law and philosophy, Philippe Carcassonne worked as a journalist for the monthly film magazine Cinématographe, then as editor-in-chief of the newspaper Médias. In 1983, Carcassonne co-authored a film encyclopedia titled Le cinema with critic Claude Beylie, published by Éditions Bordas.

Carcassonne launched his film production career in 1986 after meeting Pierre et Vacances president Gérard Brémond through mutual friends. Brémond provided Carcassonne with the funding necessary to begin in film production. Carcassonne has run the production company Cinéa (stylised Ciné@) since the mid-1980s.

In 2021, Carcassonne became a member of the Academy of Motion Picture Arts and Sciences.

== Personal life ==
In 1994, Carcassonne married the Luxembourger filmmaker Anne Fontaine. His brother is the journalist and publisher Manuel Carcassonne.

== Filmography ==
Year	Title	Credit	Director	Notes
1987	Tandem		Patrice Leconte	
1987	Les Innocents		André Téchiné	
1988	Alouette, je te plumerai		Pierre Zucca	
1988	A Few Days with Me	Delegate producer	Claude Sautet	
1989	Mama, There's a Man in Your Bed		Coline Serreau	
1989	Monsieur Hire		Patrice Leconte	
1989	Chimère		Claire Devers	
1990	Le Bal du gouverneur		Marie-France Pisier	
1990	No Fear, No Die		Claire Denis	
1990	La Désenchantée		Benoît Jacquot	
1991	Prospero's Books	Co-producer	Peter Greenaway	
1991	30 Door Key	Executive producer	Jerzy Skolimowski	
1991	Keep It for Yourself		Claire Denis	Short film
1992	A Heart in Winter		Claude Sautet	
1993	Tango	Co-producer	Patrice Leconte	
1993	Les histoires d'amour finissent mal... en général		Anne Fontaine	
1994	The Favourite Son		Nicole Garcia	
1995	Carrington	Executive producer	Christopher Hampton	
1995	A Single Girl		Benoît Jacquot	
1995	The Confessional		Robert Lepage	
1995	Augustin		Anne Fontaine	
1995	Innocent Lies	Associate producer	Patrick Dewolf	
1995	Beyond the Clouds		Michelangelo Antonioni	
1995	L'aube à l'envers		Sophie Marceau	Short film
1996	Ridicule		Patrice Leconte	
1996	Polygraph		Robert Lepage	
1997	Seventh Heaven		Benoît Jacquot	
1997	Dry Cleaning		Anne Fontaine	
1997	La Vie de Marianne		Benoît Jacquot	
1998	Dis-moi que je rêve	Delegate producer	Claude Mouriéras	
1998	Late August, Early September		Olivier Assayas	
1998	Noël en famille		Fabienne Berthaud & Aruna Villiers	Short film
1999	Augustin, King of Kung-Fu		Anne Fontaine	
1999	Franck Spadone		Richard Bean	
1999	Pas de scandale		Benoît Jacquot	
2000	Stardom	Co-producer	Denys Arcand	
2000	La Mécanique des femmes	Co-producer	Jérôme de Missolz	
2000	Sabotage!		Esteban Ibarretxe & José Miguel Ibarretxe	
2001	Félix et Lola		Patrice Leconte	
2001	How I Killed My Father		Anne Fontaine	
2001	Loin	Associate producer	André Téchiné	
2001	Read My Lips		Jacques Audiard	
2002	Rue des plaisirs		Patrice Leconte	
2002	The Man on the Train		Patrice Leconte	
2002	Royal Bonbon	Associate producer	Charles Najman	
2002	Queenas			
2005	Entre ses mains		Anne Fontaine	
2006	Oh La La!		Anne Fontaine	
2007	Days of Darkness	Co-producer	Denys Arcand	
2008	Les Bureaux de Dieu		Claire Simon	
2008	The Girl from Monaco		Anne Fontaine	
2008	Gabbla	Co-producer	Tariq Teguia	
2008	Sur ta joue ennemie		Jean-Xavier de Lestrade	
2009	Coco Before Chanel		Anne Fontaine	
2010	The Illusionist	Executive producer	Sylvain Chomet	
2010	Au fond des bois		Benoît Jacquot	
2010	Rio Sex Comedy	Co-producer	Jonathan Nossiter	
2010	Red Nights	Co-producer	Julien Carbon & Laurent Courtiaud	
2011	My Worst Nightmare		Anne Fontaine	
2011	The First Man		Gianni Amelio	
2012	Camille Rewinds		Noémie Lvovsky	
2013	Adoration		Anne Fontaine	
2014	Durazno	Investor producer	Yashira Jordán	Documentary
2014	Gemma Bovery		Anne Fontaine	
2014	Senza nessuna pietà		Michele Alhaique	
2015	Qui c'est les plus forts?		Charlotte de Turckheim	
2015	Floride		Philippe Le Guay	
2016	The Innocents	Associate producer	Anne Fontaine	
2017	Demain et tous les autres jours	Associate producer	Noémie Lvovsky	
2017	7 Jours pas plus		Héctor Cabello Reyes	
2017	Reinventing Marvin		Anne Fontaine	
2018	Pauline asservie	Co-producer	Charline Bourgeois-Tacquet	Short film
2019	Blanche comme neige		Anne Fontaine	
2020	The Father		Florian Zeller	
2020	Night Shift		Anne Fontaine	
2020	Final Set	Co-producer	Quentin Reynaud	
2021	Presidents		Anne Fontaine	
2022	Maigret		Patrice Leconte	Uncredited
2022	Mrs. Harris Goes to Paris	Executive producer	Anthony Fabian	
2022	The Son	Executive producer	Florian Zeller	
2023	Super-bourrés	Co-producer	Bastien Milheau	
2023	Marianne		Michael Rozek	
2024	Boléro		Anne Fontaine	
2024	Belle		Benoît Jacquot	

== Awards and nominations ==
Award	Year	Category	Film	Result	Ref(s)
Academy Awards	2021	Best Picture	The Father	Nominated	
British Academy Film Awards	1991	Best Film Not in the English Language	Mama, There's a Man in Your Bed	Nominated	
British Academy Film Awards	1994	Best Film Not in the English Language	A Heart in Winter	Nominated	
British Academy Film Awards	1997	Best Film Not in the English Language	Ridicule	Won	
British Academy Film Awards	2010	Best Film Not in the English Language	Coco Before Chanel	Nominated	
British Academy Film Awards	2021	Best Film	The Father	Nominated	
British Academy Film Awards	2021	Outstanding British Film	The Father	Nominated	
British Independent Film Awards	2021	Best British Independent Film	The Father	Nominated	
César Awards	2013	Best Film	Camille Rewinds	Nominated	
European Film Awards	1993	Best Film	A Heart in Winter	Nominated	
European Film Awards	2021	Best Film	The Father	Nominated	
