= Boléro (2024 film) =

- Theatrical release poster
- Directed by: Anne Fontaine
- Screenplay by: Anne Fontaine; Claire Barré; Pierre Trividic (collaboration); Jacques Fieschi (collaboration); Jean-Pierre Longeat (collaboration)
- Based on: Maurice Ravel by Marcel Marnat
- Produced by: Philippe Carcassonne; David Gauquié; Julien Deris; Jean-Louis Livi; Patrick Quinet
- Starring: Raphaël Personnaz; Doria Tillier; Jeanne Balibar; Vincent Perez; Emmanuelle Devos
- Cinematography: Christophe Beaucarne
- Edited by: Thibaut Damade
- Production companies: Ciné@; Cinéfrance Studios; F comme Film; France 2 Cinéma; Artémis Productions; RTBF; VOO; BE TV; Proximus; Shelter Prod
- Distributed by: SND
- Release dates: 27 January 2024 (IFFR); 6 March 2024 (France)
- Running time: 120 minutes
- Countries: France; Belgium
- Language: French
- Box office: $3.35 million

Boléro is a 2024 French biographical film directed by Anne Fontaine. It is about the life of musical composer Maurice Ravel during his preparation of Boléro, as commissioned by Ida Rubinstein. It is loosely adapted from Marcel Marnat's 1986 monograph Maurice Ravel.

== Plot ==
The composer Maurice Ravel takes the dancer Ida Rubinstein into a metal work factory and tries to tell her that the machine noises are music to him.

Over the opening credits, different videos showcase different interpretations of Boléro.

The film flashes back to 1903, when Ravel fails in his third attempt at the Prix de Rome. Hearing an oriental melody outside that fascinates him, he falls out of a window and injures himself.

By 1927, Ravel meets the dancer Ida Rubinstein at a reception. She insists that he writes music for her next creation. During its composition, he shares the company of his piano teacher Marguerite Long and muse Misia Sert, who is in an unhappy marriage, and takes an interest in Ravel.

Prior to an American tour, Ravel suggests to Rubinstein that he orchestrate the dance cycle Iberia by Isaac Albéniz. In America, he encounters jazz and expresses his interest in this musical genre. In an interview during the tour, Ravel explains that an idea could take several years to mature before he starts to compose it.

After his return from the American tour, Rubinstein repeatedly urges Ravel to write the ballet music, but he is suffering from writer's block. Hoping to overcome it, he retreats to the seaside and spent his time with Misia. Then Ravel learns that he is not allowed to orchestrate Iberia because the copyright belongs to the conductor Enrique Arbós, so he returns to Paris. There, Rubinstein was considering having Igor Stravinsky compose the ballet, but eventually Rubinstein and Ravel agree on a ballet length of 17 minutes.

Finally, Ravel comes up with the right theme for the new ballet music, the Boléro; he decides to extend the one-minute-long theme 17 times. Ravel presents the Boléro to Ida Rubinstein in the factory, because he sees it as an "ode to modernity" and a "metaphor for the modern world." Rubinstein is enthusiastic about the idea of performing the Boléro in a factory setting. However, during its rehearsals, she downplays Ravel's factory idea and instead she spices her dance performance with eroticism, which upsets Ravel.

Ravel recalls taking a leave of absence from his wartime medical service, visiting his mother, and learning of her illness, from which she soon dies. He then recalls a childhood scene with his mother and further remembers his five losses at the Prix de Rome.

At its premiere, Boléro is a huge success. Ravel admits to Rubinstein that the music might have something erotic about it, something he himself hadn't noticed until then.

The pianist Paul Wittgenstein, who lost his right arm due to a war injury, commissions Ravel to compose the Piano Concerto for the Left Hand. At that time Ravel was working on his Piano Concerto in G major, and experienced difficulties composing.

Ravel collapses during a rehearsal and is unable to write down his music, his neurologist friend Cipa says. Ravel was also reluctant to undergo brain surgery. Further when Marguerite put on a recording of Boléro, Ravel did not recognize his own composition. Marguerite takes Ravel to the hospital. In a dream, Ravel hears the Boléro.

The film ends with Ravel conducting the Boléro, featuring a dance interpretation by former Paris Opera Ballet étoile François Alu and a title card stating that "not a quarter of an hour goes by without Ravel's Boléro being played somewhere in the world".

== Cast ==
- Raphaël Personnaz as Maurice Ravel
- Doria Tillier as Misia Sert
- Jeanne Balibar as Ida Rubinstein
- Vincent Perez as Cipa
- Emmanuelle Devos as Marguerite Long
- Sophie Guillemin as Madame Revelot
- Anne Alvaro
- Marie Denarnaud

== Release ==
The film had its world premiere on 27 January 2024 in the Limelight programme at the 53rd International Film Festival Rotterdam.

It was released in French cinemas on 6 March 2024 by SND.
