= Hamangaí Pataxó =

Indigenous Brazilian activist

Hamangai Pataxó
- Born: Hamangaí Marcos Melo Pataxó c. 1998 (age 27–28); Bahia
- Citizenship: Brazilian
- Education: Universidade Federal do Recôncavo da Bahia
- Occupations: student, activist

Hamangaí Pataxó (born c.1998) is a Brazilian Indigenous rights activist. She attracted international attention when she was invited to the Young Activists Summit in Geneva. She continues to protest about the rights of indigenous people in Brazil.

== Life ==
Pataxó was born Hamangaí Marcos Melo Pataxó in about 1998 in the Brazilian state Bahia in a small village. She has both Terena and Pataxós Hã-hã-hae heritage. It was 460 km north from her home to the state capital of Salvador. As a child she saw conflicts between her indigenous community and local farmers who both believed that had ownership of land because traditional ownership of land is not recognised. She has been recognised as a spokesperson and she was quoted as explaining "Our body is our territory; our belly is our temple; our veins are our rivers".

In 2015 she joined peaceful protests at Acampamento Terra Livre and in following year she joined Engajamundo which is an organisation run by young people.

She studied veterinary science at the Universidade Federal do Recôncavo da Bahia.

In 2019 she was invited to Geneva where she joined Memory Banda from Malawi, Rebecca Kabuo from the Democratic Republic of Congo who fights for good governance, and campaigners Amy and Ella Meek from the United Kingdom at the Young Activists Summit that included the Nobel Peace laureate Nadia Murad. The six received Young Activist Awards. Pataxo featured in a Swiss profile and in her own short episode of a French series about women activists.

By 2022 she was the national coordinator of the Engajamundo organisation and contributing to protests about indigenous rights. The people protesting were wearing traditional clothing and Pataxo wore a large blue headdress. The protesters were from different generations and the rights of women were being emphasised. Thousands of indigenous women each year were reporting violence. She has spoken about how colonisers not only took their land but they also claimed the ownership of the bodies of the local people.
