= Memory Banda =

Malawian children's rights activist

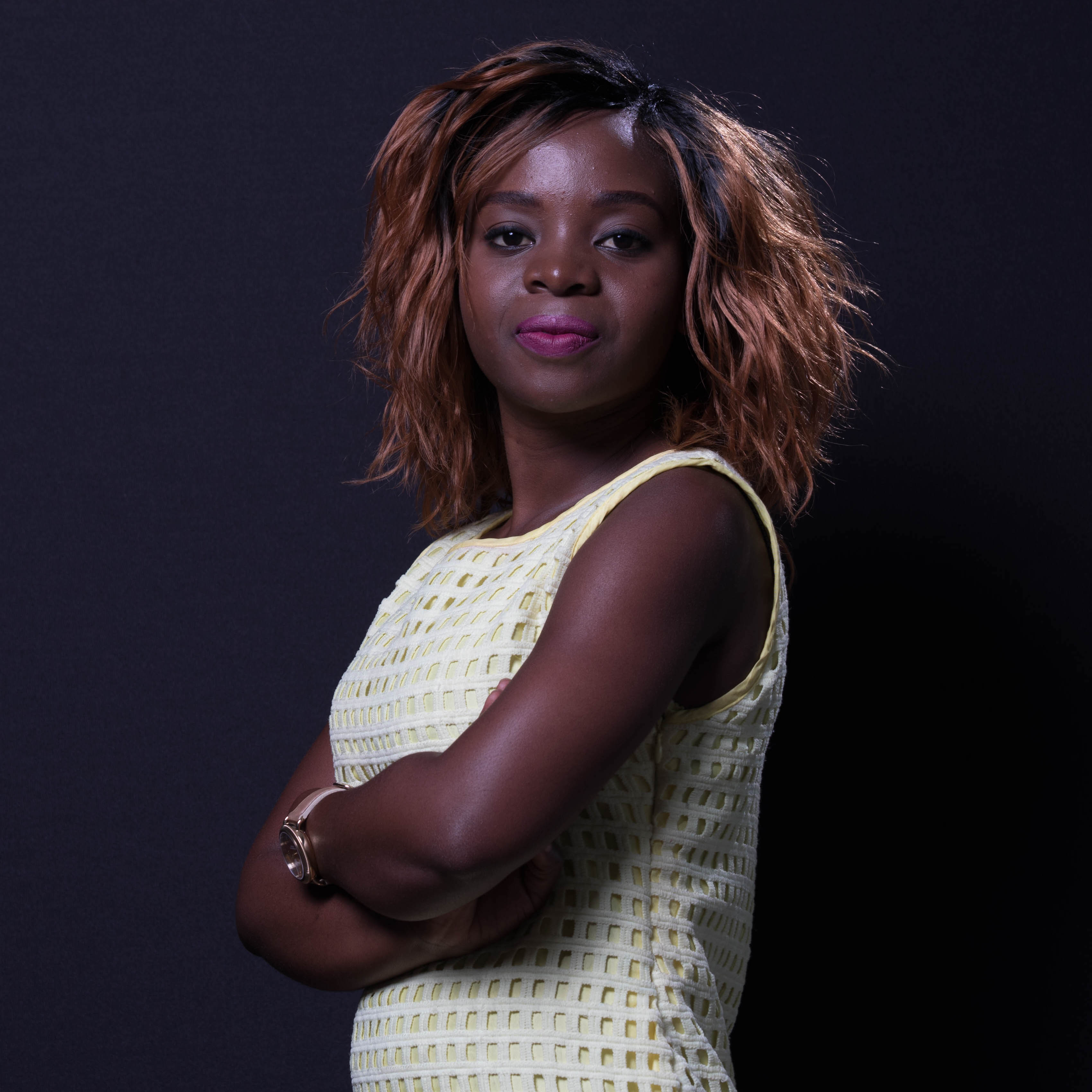
- Born: September 24, 1996 (age 30); Mzimba District
- Occupation: Activist

Memory Banda (born September 24, 1996) is a Malawian children's rights activist who has drawn international attention for her work in opposition to child marriage. She has received support from Switzerland, the UN, Michelle Obama, Amal Clooney, and Melinda French Gates.

== Early life ==
Banda was born in Mzimba District and grew up in Chiradzulu District. Her father died when she was four years old, and she was raised by her mother. Despite growing in a singled-headed family, Memory defied the odds of early marriage in her community. In 2009, sister Mercy was forced to marry at the age of 11 after she became pregnant during an initiation ceremony. At a young age, Memory aspired to be different from everybody and everything. She acknowledges that she was a tough girl. She had a voice, even though her culture reminded her to be quiet and silent because she was a girl child.

== Activism ==
A 2014 Human Rights Watch report found that "one out of two girls in [Malawi] on average was married by her 18th birthday". Memory Banda has played an influential role at both community, national and recently international level, including presentation of a TED talk, speaking at the 59th United Nations Commission on the Status of Women, and at the Oslo Freedom Forum. She advocated for traditional leaders to formulate by-laws that protect the girl child and at national level she advocated for the legal age of marriage to be raised from 15 to 18 years of age. This led to the law being changed to recognize 18 years as the legal age of marriage in Malawi. But Memory is more concerned about the enforcement of the law and she continues to advocate for the girl-child empowerment. Memory has created Malawi’s Girls Empowerment Network (GENET) and Let Girls Lead girls community groups in an effort to keep girls in school and raise awareness of their rights. She collaborated on a story telling project were young girls shared their experiences, dreams and challenges they face through different forms of art and theater.

In 2018 there was a sixteen day campaign against gender based violence. The campaign was called Fuula momentum. Fuula is the Chichewe word for "shout out". The leaders of the campaign included Willson Chivhanga, executive director of NGO, Every Girl in School Alliance (EGISA). Banda was the focus on day one and the Coalition for the Empowerment of Women and Girls' executive director Beatrice Mateyo was the lead on day two. Lecturer Margret Tendai Mwale, Police officer Alexander Ngwala, lawyer Juliet Chimwaga Sibale and survivor Lucy Trizah Titus Gondwe.

In 2019 she was invited to Geneva where she joined Hamangai Pataxo from Brazil, Rebecca Kabuo from the Democratic Republic of Congo who fights for good governance, and Amy and Ella Meek from the United Kingdom at the Summit that included the Nobel Peace laureate Nadia Murad as a special guest. They met guests at the UN office where Banda's presentation was said to have left the audience "speechless". They six each received Young Activist Awards.

In 2021, she was featured in the French documentary film Bigger Than Us. She was working with orphans in Mtandile which is an area of Lilongwe. Her organisation "Foundation for Girls Leadership" was supporting twenty teenage orphan girls to attend school and to avoid exploitation. She was receiving help from a supporting group in Switzerland.

Michelle Obama, Amal Clooney, and Melinda French Gates honoured Banda. Michelle Obama awarded Banda with a Justice for Women Award in 2024 at "the Albies" .
