= Prostitution in Malawi =

Prostitution in Malawi is legal and prevalent around hotels and bars in urban and tourist areas. Living off the proceeds of prostitution is illegal. In 2015, it was estimated there were 20,000 sex workers in Malawi.

Human trafficking, HIV and child prostitution are problems in the country.

== Overview ==
Whilst some street prostitution occurs, because of police harassment its extent is limited. Most prostitution occurs in bars and hotels. "Bar girls" are employed by the owners on very low wages; they make up their money by prostitution. Although prostitutes in bars are mostly employed by the bar owners, there are some freelance girls who will try to attract customers by moving from bar to bar. Food handling hygiene rules require all staff employed in bars to have monthly health checks, but this is not always enforced. Often the bar girls are from rural areas, moving to the towns and cities in search of lucrative employment.

Sex workers and NGOs report harassment and abuse from the police, including violence, theft and forced sex. They also report that police take no action if abuse or violence by clients is reported to them by sex workers.

Prostitution also occurs around the logging centres of Luwawa, Nthungwa, Raiply and Kalungulu. The prostitutes work from small shacks around the villages in the forests.

In previous years many women from Malawi went to work in Zambia's copperfields as prostitutes. The road leading towards Zambia came to be known as mtengamahule (conveyor of prostitutes). The border was subsequently closed to "unmarried women".

== Legal situation ==
Section 146 of the Malawi Penal Code prohibits living off the earnings of prostitution. This has been interpreted by the courts to include a sex worker's own earnings, effectively making prostitution illegal. Section 184(c) of the Penal Code makes an offence of: "every person in or upon or near any premises or in any road or highway or any place adjacent thereto or in any public place at such time and under such circumstances as to lead to the conclusion that such person is there for an illegal or disorderly purpose, is deemed a rogue and vagabond". (This law is based on the British Vagrancy Act 1824). This legislation was used to target sex workers.

Eleven sex workers were arrested in 2009 in the southern city of Mwanza. They were taken to a hospital and forcibly given HIV tests. The positive results of the tests were later read out in open court. The sex workers later sued the Malawi government for "damages as compensation for violation of their constitutional rights and trauma suffered as a result of actions of the police and a hospital”. High Court judge, Dorothy Kamanga, ruled that the sex workers should be compensated, and that the actions of the police and health workers were "irrational, unjust, unfair and unreasonable."

In September 2016, the Zomba High Court ruled that Section 146 of the Penal Code was meant to protect sex workers against exploitation, not criminalise sex workers. The court overturned the conviction of the 19 sex workers that had appealed against conviction by a magistrates court.

In January 2017, three judges of the Malawi High Court declared section 184(1)(c) of the Penal Code unconstitutional and invalid.

== HIV ==
Like other Sub-Saharan Africa countries, HIV is a major problem in Malawi. In 2016 the adult prevalence rate was 9.2%. Sex workers are a high risk group with a 24.9% prevalence rate in 2016. The reluctance of clients to use condoms, and lack of access to health services for sex workers are contributory causes. Clients may offer up to 4 times the usual rate for sex without a condom. Condoms are also in short supply in some areas of the country.

== COVID ==
In 2021, as the COVID-19 pandemic hit Malawi, the Female Sex Workers Association (FSWA) organised protests regarding restrictions on human contact. Their leader Zinenani Majawa argued that while the precautions had not been applied to married couples, they were used by the police to restrict the ability of sex workers to make a living. She led a protest in Lilongwe where sex-workers were demanding that bars should be allowed to open more freely. They took a petition to the council offices. Majawa said that their work had been affected by COVID-19 and these drinking establishments were their offices. They had rooms over the bars and the police would arrive and beat them. In February following a protest the FSWA was offered a loan at a meeting with the office of the President and the Cabinet to compensate then for the bars closing early. However Majawa reported to the AIDS and Rights Alliance for Southern Africa (ARASA) that the procedure was so complex that by August they had not seen any money - but the bars still closed.

== Sex trafficking ==
Malawi is a source country for women, and children subjected to sex trafficking. To a lesser extent, it is a destination country for men, women, and children from Zambia, Mozambique, the African Great Lakes region, and the Horn of Africa who are subjected to sex trafficking, and a transit country for people from these countries exploited in South Africa. Traffickers, primarily facilitators or brothel owners, typically lure children from their families in rural areas under pretences of employment opportunities, clothing, or lodging for which they are sometimes charged exorbitant fees, resulting in prostitution coerced through debts. Traffickers subject young girls to sexual exploitation in nightclubs or bars. Malawian victims of sex trafficking have been identified in Mozambique, South Africa, Zambia, and Tanzania. Some young girls are drugged, gang-raped, and exploited in commercial sex. Some girls recruited for domestic service are instead forced to marry and subsequently subjected to child sex trafficking by their “husbands”. Fraudulent employment agencies lure women and girls to Gulf states where they are exploited in sex trafficking.

The United States Department of State Office to Monitor and Combat Trafficking in Persons ranks Malawi as a Tier 2 country.

== See also ==
- Sex for fish
