= Stanislas Merhar =

French actor (born 1971)

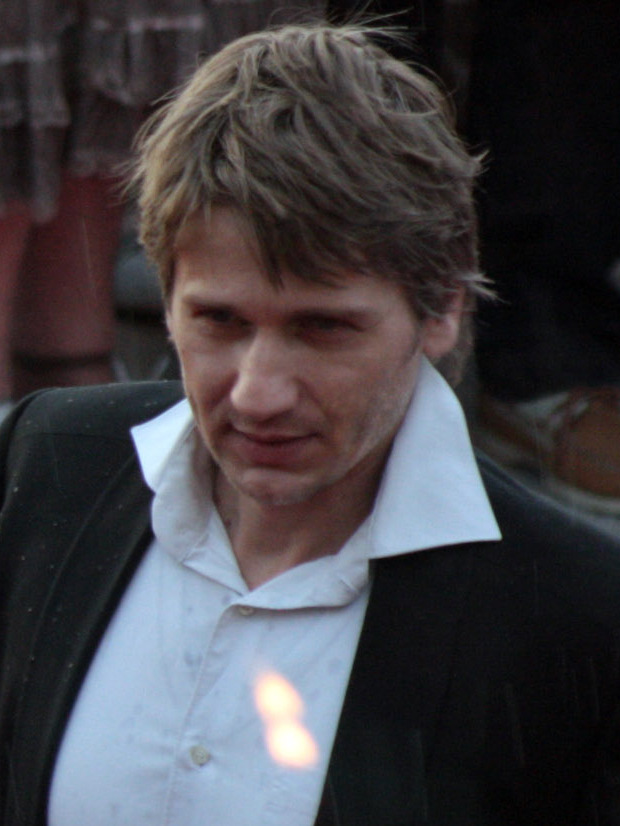
- Merhar in 2011
- Born: 24 January 1971 (age 55); Paris, France
- Occupation: Actor
- Years active: 1997–present
- Partner: Vanessa Paradis (1997–98)

Stanislas Merhar (born 24 January 1971) is a French actor.

He was born in Paris in a family of immigrants from Slovenia. He works in cinema, television and theatre.

In 1998 Merhar won the César Award for Most Promising Actor for his role in the film Dry Cleaning.

== Filmography ==
1997 : Nettoyage à sec (Dry Cleaning) by Anne Fontaine
1998 : The Count of Monte Cristo (TV miniseries, played the role of Albert de Morcerf) by Josée Dayan
1999 : La Lettre by Manoel de Oliveira
1999 : Furia by Alexandre Aja
1999 : Franck Spadone by Richard Bean
2000 : La Captive by Chantal Akerman
2000 : Les Savates du bon Dieu by Jean-Claude Brisseau
2001 : Nobel by Fabio Carpi
2001 : The Knights of the Quest by Pupi Avati
2002 : Almost Peaceful by Michel Deville
2002 : Merci Docteur Rey by Andrew Litvack
2003 : Courtes Histoires de train court métrage by François Aunay
2003 : Adolphe by Benoît Jacquot
2003 : L'Enfance de Catherine by Anne Baudry, short film
2005 : The Art of Breaking Up by Michel Deville
2005 : Code 68 de Jean-Henri Roger
2006 : Comme un chat noir au fond d'un sac by Stéphane Elmadjian
2006 : Müetter de Dominique Lienhard
2006 : L'Héritage by Géla Babluani and Temur Babluani
2011 : En ville by Valérie Mréjen and Bertrand Schefer
2011 : The Art of Love by Emmanuel Mouret
2011 : Almayer's Folly by Chantal Akerman
2012 : Climats by Caroline Huppert
2013 : Left Foot Right Foot by Germinal Roaux
2014 : Rosenn by Yvan Le Moine
2015 : L'Ombre des femmes by Philippe Garrel
2017 : Madame by Amanda Sthers
2018 : The Black Book
2023 : Liaison by Virginie Brac
2024 : Being Maria by Jessica Palud
