= Franck Spadone =

1999 crime film

- Directed by: Richard Bean
- Screenplay by: Richard Bean; Sophie Feldman
- Produced by: Philippe Carcassonne; Alain Sarde
- Starring: Stanislas Merhar; Monica Bellucci
- Cinematography: Philippe Van Leeuw
- Edited by: Andrée Davanture
- Music by: Olivier Lebé
- Release date: 1999
- Language: French

Franck Spadone, also known as Striptease, is a 1999 French crime film co-written and directed by Richard Bean, in his feature directorial debut. It premiered at the 56th Venice International Film Festival, in the Venice International Film Critics' Week sidebar.

== Cast ==
- Stanislas Merhar as Franck Spadone
- Monica Bellucci as Laura
- Carlo Brandt as Ferdinand
- Antoine Fayard as Pablo
- Christophe Le Masne as Bruno
- Jean-Claude Lecas as Jean
- Patrick Sueur as Henri
- Barbara Roig as Isabelle
- Meyer Bokobza as Osmuth
- Dominique Besnehard as the expert
- Frankie Pain as Franck's mother
- Dimitri Storoge

== Release ==
The film had its world premiere at the 56th edition of the Venice Film Festival, in the Venice International Film Critics' Week sidebar.

== Reception ==
Variety's critic Deborah Young described the film as "visually ambitious, cool as ice and devoid of contents", with Bean taking his characters "terribly seriously, whatever illogical things they do". Svet Atanasov from DVD Talk praised it, referring to it as a " near perfect" film that "virtually places its audience in a state of trance".
