= The Knights of the Quest =

2001 film by Pupi Avati

I Cavalieri che fecero l'impresa
- Directed by: Pupi Avati
- Written by: Pupi Avati
- Produced by: Antonio Avati; Tarak Ben Ammar; Mark Lombardo
- Starring: Edward Furlong; Raoul Bova; Thomas Kretschmann; Marco Leonardi; Stanislas Merhar; Edmund Purdom; Yorgo Voyagis; Carlo Delle Piane; F. Murray Abraham
- Cinematography: Pasquale Rachini
- Music by: Riz Ortolani
- Distributed by: 20th Century Fox (Italy)
- Release date: 6 April 2001 (Italy)
- Running time: 147 minutes
- Countries: Italy; France
- Languages: Italian; French; English
- Budget: $13–15 million

The Knights of the Quest (Italian: "I Cavalieri che fecero l'impresa") is a 2001 French-Italian epic adventure historical drama film directed by Pupi Avati and starring Edward Furlong, Raoul Bova and Thomas Kretschmann.

== Plot ==
In 1271, Europe is still reeling from the failure of the Seventh Crusade. King Louis IX of France, gravely ill and aware of his approaching death, entrusts a secret and dangerous mission to a small group of knights. A sacred Christian relic known as the Holy Shroud, once kept in the French royal treasury, has disappeared and is believed to have been taken east during the chaos of the Crusades. Fearing political unrest and religious scandal, the king orders the relic to be recovered in secrecy.

Five knights from different lands and backgrounds are chosen for the quest. Though united by faith and duty, they are divided by temperament, personal histories, and differing motivations. Their journey begins in France and takes them across war-torn Europe and into hostile territories once controlled by crusader armies. Along the way, they encounter mercenaries, traitors, and remnants of crusading forces who have lost their purpose.

As the expedition progresses, internal conflicts begin to surface. Some knights question the true value of the relic, while others struggle with guilt, fear, and disillusionment caused by years of warfare. The harsh realities of travel, ambushes, and moral compromise gradually erode their sense of idealism. One by one, the knights are forced to confront their personal limits, and not all survive the journey.

Eventually, the surviving knights discover the fate of the Holy Shroud and the terrible cost associated with its protection. The mission’s conclusion reveals that the true significance of the quest lies not in the relic itself, but in the sacrifices made and the spiritual reckoning faced by those who sought it. The film ends on a somber note, emphasizing the decline of the crusading era and the human toll of religious wars.

== Cast ==
- Edward Furlong as Simon di Clarendon
- Raoul Bova as Giacomo di Altogiovanni
- Thomas Kretschmann as Vanni delle Rondini
- Marco Leonardi as Ranieri di Panico
- Stanislas Merhar as Jean de Cent Acres
- Edmund Purdom as Hugh di Clarendon
- Yorgo Voyagis as Isacco Sathas
- Carlo Delle Piane as Giovanni da Cantalupo
- F. Murray Abraham as Delfinello da Coverzano
- Gigliola Cinquetti as the Mother Superior
- Cesare Cremonini as Monk

== Production ==
=== Casting ===
Variety reported that Italian actor Kim Rossi Stuart was eyed to play Vanni delle Rondini; however, for unknown reasons, he was replaced with German actor Thomas Kretschmann. English actor James Fox was meant to portray a supporting character, but he never joined the cast.

=== Filming ===
Principal photography began on 3 April 2000, and lasted for 16 weeks. The budget was estimated to be between $13 million to $15 million. Filming took place on location in Italy, France, and Tunisia.
