= Dry Cleaning (film) =

1997 film by Anne Fontaine

- Film poster
- French: Nettoyage à sec
- Directed by: Anne Fontaine
- Written by: Anne Fontaine; Gilles Taurand
- Produced by: Philippe Carcassonne; Alain Sarde
- Starring: Miou-Miou; Charles Berling; Stanislas Merhar; Mathilde Seigner
- Cinematography: Caroline Champetier
- Edited by: Luc Barnier
- Music by: Edouard Dubois
- Production companies: Cinéa; Les Films Alain Sarde; Maestranza Films
- Distributed by: AMLF
- Release dates: 4 September 1997 (Venice); 24 September 1997 (France)
- Running time: 95 minutes
- Countries: France; Spain
- Language: French
- Budget: $4.1 million
- Box office: $3.3 million

Dry Cleaning (French: Nettoyage à sec) is a 1997 drama film directed by Anne Fontaine and written by Fontaine and Gilles Taurand which stars Miou-Miou, Charles Berling, and Stanislas Merhar. The film won the Golden Osella for Best Screenplay at the 54th Venice International Film Festival.

== Plot ==
Nicole and Jean-Marie Kunstler are a noble, hard working couple who have been married for 15 years. They operate a dry cleaning business. They met a brother-sister drag queen performing team, then their lives completely changed.

== Cast ==
- Miou-Miou as Nicole Kunstler
- Charles Berling as Jean-Marie Kunstler
- Stanislas Merhar as Loïc
- Mathilde Seigner as Marylin
- Nanou Meister as Yvette
- Noé Pflieger as Pierre
- Michel Bompoil as Robert
- Christopher King as Steve
- Gérard Blanc as Bertrand

== Production ==
The film is a Cinea, Les Films Alain Sarde and Maestranza Films French-Spanish co-production, with the participation of CNC, and Canal Plus.

== Accolades ==
Award / Film Festival	Category	Recipients and nominees	Result
54th Venice International Film Festival	Golden Lion	Anne Fontaine	Nominated
54th Venice International Film Festival	Golden Osella	Anne Fontaine and Gilles Taurand	Won
23rd César Awards	Best Actor	Charles Berling	Nominated
23rd César Awards	Best Actress	Miou-Miou	Nominated
23rd César Awards	Best Supporting Actress	Mathilde Seigner	Nominated
23rd César Awards	Best Original Screenplay or Adaptation	Anne Fontaine and Gilles Taurand	Nominated
23rd César Awards	Most Promising Actor	Stanislas Merhar	Won
Lumière Awards	Best Actress	Miou-Miou	Won
