= Augustin, King of Kung-Fu =

- Theatrical release poster
- Directed by: Anne Fontaine
- Written by: Anne Fontaine; Jacques Fieschi; Gilles Taurand
- Produced by: Philippe Carcassonne; Brigitte Faure; Philippe Jacquier
- Starring: Jean-Chrétien Sibertin-Blanc; Maggie Cheung; Darry Cowl; Bernard Campan
- Cinematography: Christophe Pollock
- Edited by: Luc Barnier
- Release date: 25 August 1999
- Running time: 89 minutes
- Country: France
- Language: French

Augustin, King of Kung-Fu (French: Augustin, roi du Kung-fu) is a 1999 French film directed by Anne Fontaine.

== Cast and roles ==
- Jean-Chrétien Sibertin-Blanc as Augustin, an actor playing in minor roles. He is passionate about kung fu and has self-studied by watching movies and practicing in his small apartment
- Maggie Cheung as Ling, an acupuncture doctor. She studied in Guangzhou and has been living with her cousins in Paris for a year and a half
- Darry Cowl as René
- Bernard Campan as Boutinot
- Paulette Dubost as Madame Haton, the old neighbor
- Pascal Bonitzer as The movie director
- Ming Shan as Kung-fu teacher
- Patricia Dinev as Chantal
- Fanny Ardant as herself
- Anne-Laure Meury as Prostitute
- Ham-Chau Luong as Kung-fu master in the dream
- Winston Ong as Monsieur Li
- Reinaldo Wong as The hotel receptionist
- Marc Hoang as Ballet soloist
- André Dussollier as himself

== Filming locations ==
- Paris, mainly in the Chinatown of the 13th arrondissement
- Beijing
