= Lingson Belekanyama =

Malawian politician (died 2021)

Lingson Belekanyama (died 12 January 2021) was a Malawian politician who served as Minister of Local Government and Rural Development.

He was a conviction politician of the Malawi Congress Party.

He died of COVID-19 during the COVID-19 pandemic in Malawi.

He was buried at Chimphwanya Village, TA Masula in Mitundu, Lilongwe.
