= Zinenani Majawa =

Malawian sex worker activist

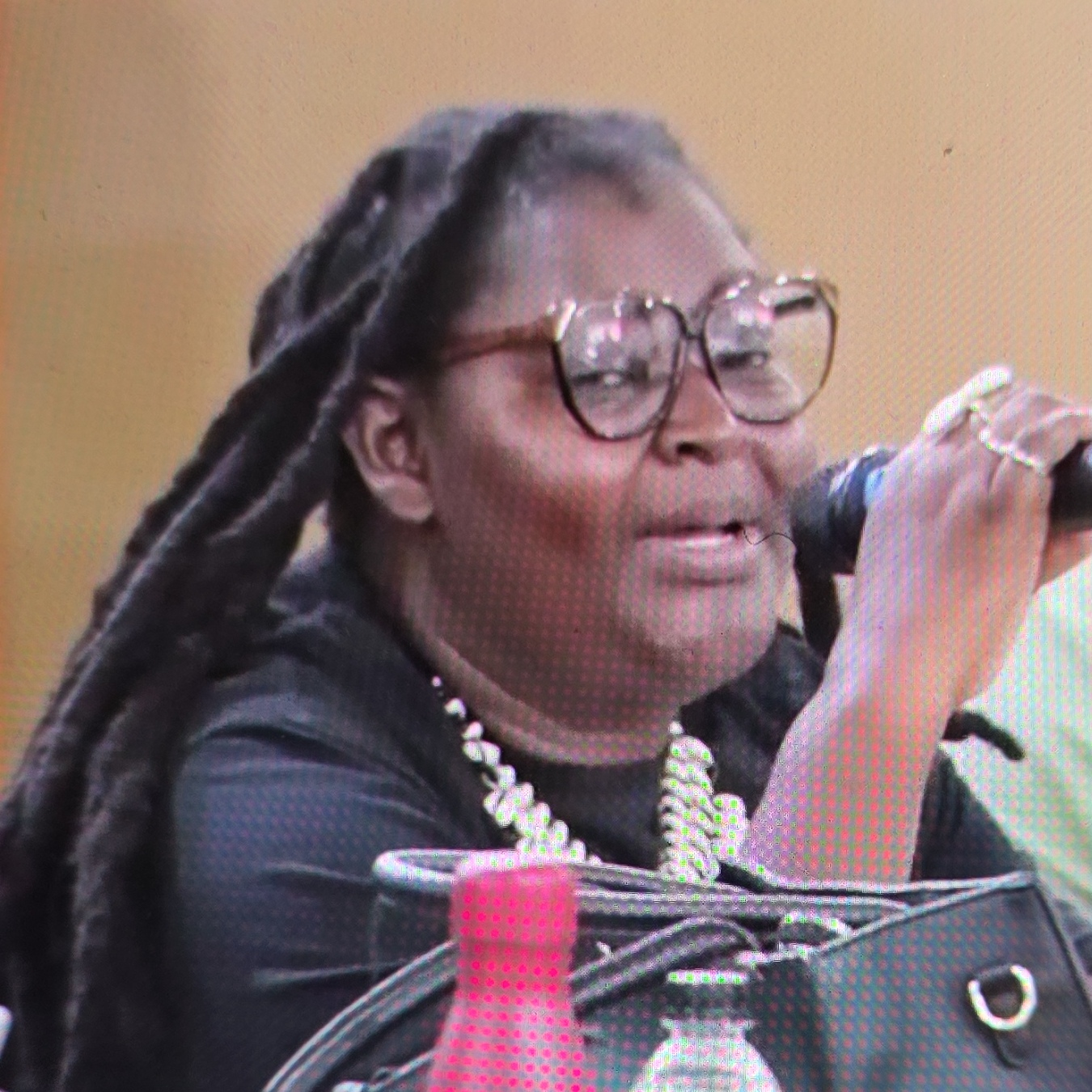
- Majawa in 2025
- Occupations: sex worker and activist
- Known for: executive director of Malawi's Female Sex Workers Association
- Children: 1

Zinenani Lucy Majawa is a Malawian activist who is the founder and executive director of Malawi's Female Sex Workers Association (FSWA). During the COVID-19 pandemic she led protests against the government's disregard for the sex workers' livelihoods. She has been Malawi's Civil Society Advocacy Forum's elected representative with regard to AIDS and HIV related funding.

== Life ==
Majawa is a sex worker and the founder and executive director of Malawi's Female Sex Workers Association (FSWA). She has a son and her work supports the two of them and his education.

== Activism ==
Although sex work is not illegal in Malawi, the police arrested sex workers under charges such as the "rogue and vagabond law", which allowed arrests based on the suspicion that a person is doing something illegal. This law was declared unconstitutional in January 2017. Police also use a law which makes it illegal to live on the profits of prostitution. This law was intended to protect sex workers from being exploited but it is redirected at them. Majawa said they use a Idle and Disorderly law. They are arrested and fined and the police do not give them a receipt for the fine.

The Women's Lawyers Association was one of the groups who supported the Minister of Health, Atupele Muluzi, who persuaded parliament to de-criminalise the transmission of HIV in December 2017. This included protests by Majawa of the Female Sex Workers Association. The FSWA said they had 120,000 members. They argued the law was based on fear and not on logic, and that the law's continued existence increased violence against women. UNICEF had noted in 2017 that teenagers in Malawi were being driven to sell sex because of the droughts and poor harvests.

In 2020, Majawa was a member of the Malawi Global Fund Coordinating Committee. She was also one of 15 members of the Malawi Civil Society National Reference Group, which was established in 2019 to counter violence against women. The other members included Esmie Tembenu, Esther Bonyonga, Barbra Banda, Chief Mlolo and Beatrice Mateyo Mkanda.

In 2021, as the COVID-19 pandemic hit Malawi, Majawa and the Female Sex Workers Association (FSWA) organised protests regarding restrictions on human contact. Majawa argued that while the precautions would not be applied to married couples, they would be used by the police to restrict the ability of sex workers to make a living. She led a protest in Lilongwe where sex workers were demanding that bars should be allowed to open more freely. They took a petition to the council offices. Majawa said that their work had been affected by COVID-19 and these drinking establishments were their offices. They had rooms over the bars and the police would arrive and beat them. In February following a protest the FSWA was offered a loan at a meeting with the office of the President and the Cabinet to compensate then for the bars closing early. However, Majawa reported to the AIDS and Rights Alliance for Southern Africa (ARASA) that the procedure was so complex that by August they had not seen any money - but the bars still closed.

She stood down in 2022 as Malawi's Civil Society Advocacy Forum's elected representative on the Malawi Global Fund Country Coordinating Mechanism which negotiated funding for HIV and AIDS prevention. She was succeeded by Lawrence Phiri and he lauded her integrity and steadfastness.

In 2025 she was consulted over sex workers' attitude to safe sex. Three years before, the National Aids Commission, had estimated that about half of the sex workers were living with HIV. Some were giving priority to customers who offered extra for unprotected sex. Majawa noted that her members needed to survive: "We encourage condom use, but money talks".
