= The Captive (2000 film) =

La Captive
- Directed by: Chantal Akerman
- Written by: Chantal Akerman
- Produced by: Paulo Branco
- Starring: Olivia Bonamy; Sylvie Testud; Stanislas Merhar
- Cinematography: Sabine Lancelin
- Edited by: Claire Atherton
- Release date: September 27, 2000 (France)
- Running time: 118 minutes
- Countries: France; Belgium
- Language: French

The Captive (La Captive) is a 2000 drama film written and directed by Chantal Akerman and featuring Olivia Bonamy, Sylvie Testud and Stanislas Merhar.

This French-language film is loosely based on Marcel Proust's novel La Prisonnière.

== Plot ==
Simon (Stanislas Merhar) lives in an apartment with his grandmother and his girlfriend Ariane (Sylvie Testud). He follows Ariane on a daily basis, testing her to see where she is going, what she is doing and whether she is lying to him about what she does. Ariane submits to his controlling ways, including letting him have sex with her while she is feigning sleep, the only way he seems capable of having intercourse. Simon begins to grow jealous of Ariane's friends and suspects that she is having an affair with another woman. Unable to let go of his jealousy, he asks her to move out of his apartment.

Ariane agrees to leave Simon and he drives her to her aunt's house where she plans to move. During the drive, they discuss what they consider love to be. Simon confesses that he doesn't believe love is possible without knowing everything about the other person, while Ariane disagrees and admits she likes having thoughts and feelings that Simon is unable to access. When they arrive at Ariane's aunt's home, Simon finds himself unable to leave her there and begs her to come back. Ariane agrees. On the way home, they stop at a seaside hotel, but while Simon orders food for Ariane, she disappears and he is left alone in the hotel. Believing that she has committed suicide by drowning, he dives into the water to try to find her. Simon is rescued by a boat and brought back to shore without Ariane.

== Cast ==
- Stanislas Merhar as Simon
- Sylvie Testud as Ariane
- Olivia Bonamy as Andrée
- Liliane Rovère as Françoise
- Françoise Bertin as The grandmother
- Aurore Clément as Léa
- Anna Mouglalis as Isabelle
- Bérénice Bejo as Sarah
