= Theresa Mkandawire =

- Born: Mzimba
- Education: Oklahoma State University, University of Leeds Metropolitan
- Employer: MUBAS
- Known for: Professor in civil engineering

Theresa Wongani Mkandawire is a Malawian academic and civil engineer. She was the first Malawian woman to attain a professorship in civil engineering.

== Life ==
Mkandawire was born in Mzimba and her farmer parents later had five more children. Her family moved to Mzimba and Dedza and her schools included the selective Lilongwe Girls Secondary School which she joined in 1984. She had aspired to be a nurse but her parents supported her ambitions and her decision to study engineering. She graduated with a distinction on Civil Engineering from what was then called Malawi Polytechnic. She went to work before she was funded to attend Oklahoma State University. She graduated in 1996 with a Master of Science degree in environmental engineering. In the following year she joined her alma mater as a lecturer. In 2012 she was an associate professor when the University of Leeds Metropolitan awarded her a doctorate.

She was the first vice president of the Malawi Engineering Institution. She was the first Malawian woman to be a Dean of Engineering. She was elected to be the secretary-general of the Africa Engineering Deans Council.

Mkandawire created a mining department and in collaboration with Leeds Becket University and the University of Botswana she established a masters degree in mining at MUBAS.

She has been entrusted with drafting water and sanitation policies for the Malawian government.

Mkandawire became the first Malawian woman to attain a professorship in civil engineering in 2023. Her department collaborates with Rice University in Texas.

== Private life ==
Her husband is Gift Mkandawire and they have three children.
