= Coalition for the Empowerment of Women and Girls =

Malawian non-governmental organisation

- Abbreviation: CEWAG
- Formation: 2016
- Type: NGO
- Headquarters: Lilongwe
- Location: Malawi
- Executive Director: Beatrice Mateyo
- Website: www.facebook.com/CEWAGMalawi/

Coalition for the Empowerment of Women and Girls (CEWAG) is a Malawian non-governmental organisation that promotes women rights through advocacy, capacity building, awareness raising, research and coalition building. The organisation's headquarters is in Lilongwe.

== History and legal status ==
CEWAG was formed in 2016 and registered in February 2017 with Malawi's NGO regulatory bodies, including the Council for Non-Governmental Organisations (CONGOMA) and the NGO Regulatory Authority (NGORA). CEWAG was established to coordinate civil-society efforts to empower girls and women, prevent gender-based violence (GBV), and support survivors of abuse through skills training and advocacy.

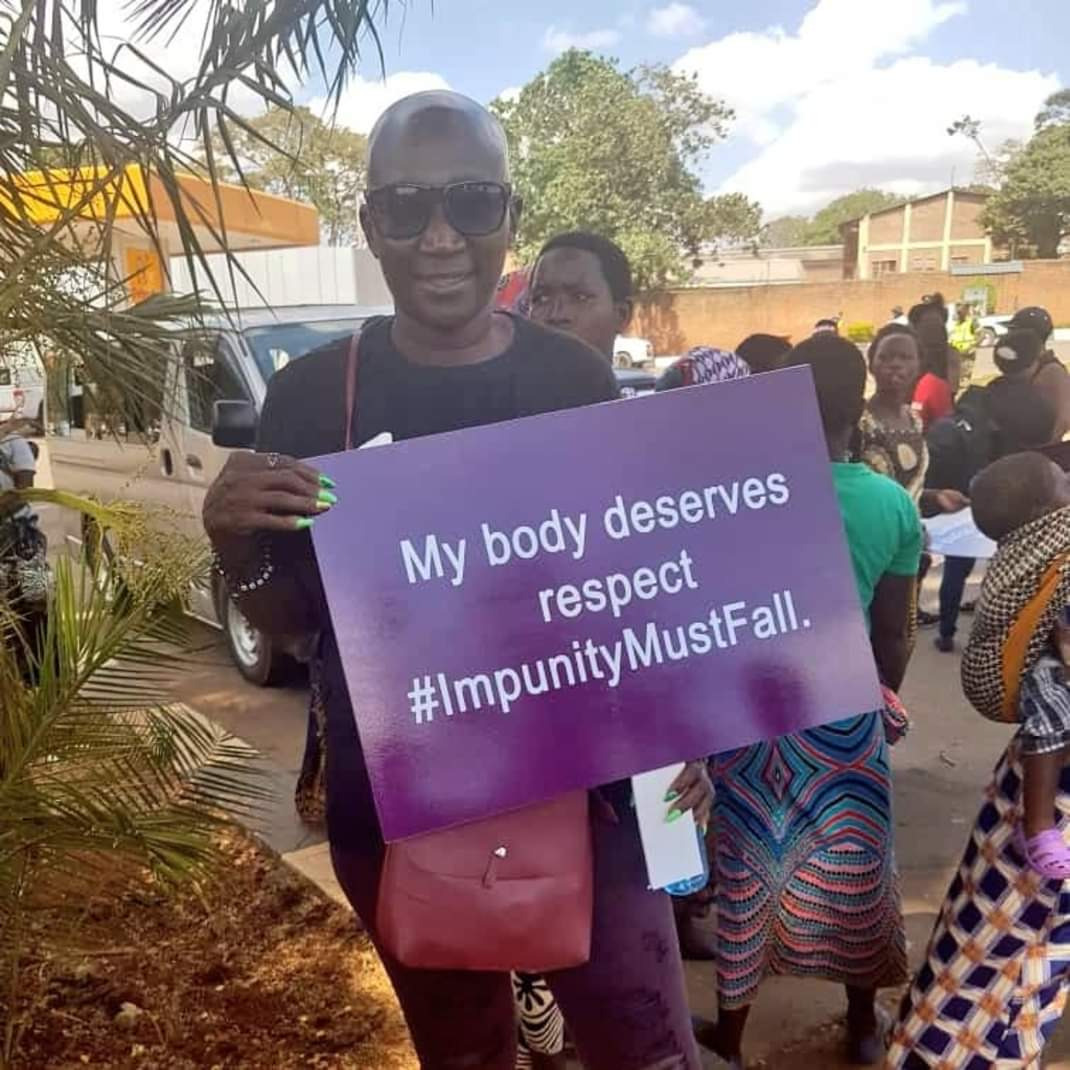
Beatrice Mateyo

In 2018 the Coalition was one of the supporters of a sixteen day campaign against gender based violence. The campaign was called Fuula momentum. Fuula is the Chichewe word for "shout out". The leaders of the campaign were Willson Chivhanga, executive director of NGO, Every Girl in School Alliance (EGISA). Memory Banda was the focus on day one and CEWAG's executive director Beatrice Mateyo was the lead on day two. Lecturer Margret Tendai Mwale, Police officer Alexander Ngwala, lawyer Juliet Chimwaga Sibale and survivor Lucy Trizah Titus Gondwe.

The chair of the Coalition is the UTM politician Hellen Chabunya. The executive director Beatrice Mateyo has spoke openly about sexual violence in her life. In 2020 she recalled her own rape as an example while advocating the legalisation of abortion for pregnancies created by rape.
