= Melati and Isabel Wijsen =

Indonesian climate activists

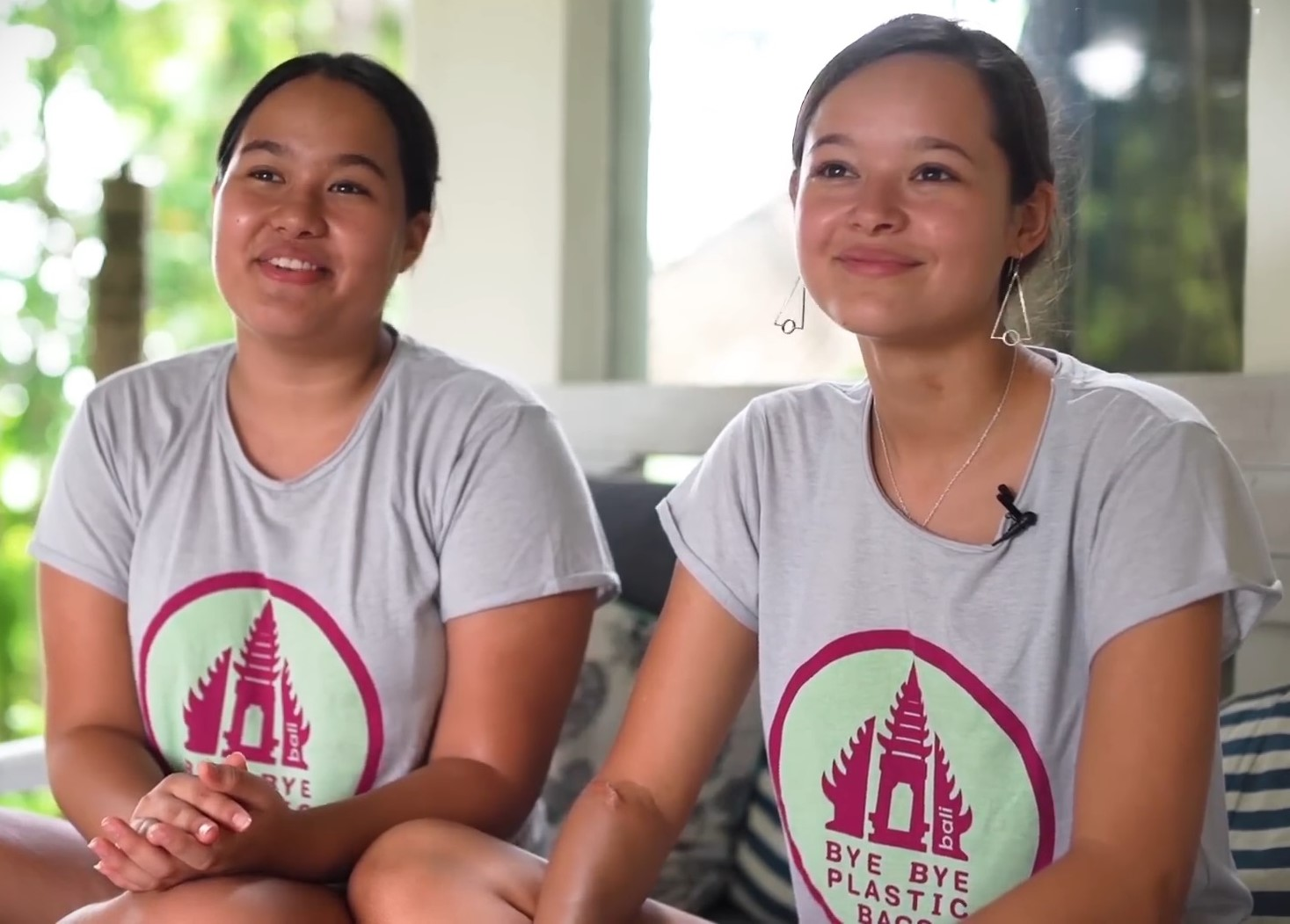
(left to right) Isabel and Melati Wijsen in 2019

Melati Riyanto Wijsen (born 2000) and Isabel Wijsen (born 6 November 2002) are Indonesian climate activists. The two sisters are known for their efforts to reduce plastic consumption in Bali.

The sisters were born in Bali to Dutch and Indonesian parents. In 2013, when Melati was 12 and Isabel was 10 years old, inspired by a lesson about positive world leaders at the Green School Bali, they brainstormed ideas on how to aid Indonesia's problem with plastic pollution, since it is the second worst plastic polluter in the world after China.

When the sisters found out that less than 5% of the plastic bags in Bali were being recycled, They decided to begin their campaign Bye Bye Plastic Bags with the help of other children in the island. In order to gain public attention, the campaign organized cleanups, presentations, and distribution of alternative bags. They organized Bali's biggest beach cleanup in 2018 with 20,000 people who collected 65 tons of waste.

In order to get the government's help, the sisters started a petition in 2015 which would eventually gather 100,000 signatures at the Bali International Airport. It wasn't until they staged a dawn to dusk hunger strike, when they were finally able to successfully arrange a meeting with Bali's then-governor, I Made Mangku Pastika, who promised to make Bali plastic free by 2018.

Bye Bye Plastic Bags is a social initiative and NGO driven by youth to say no to plastic bags. Their message reached stages around the world like TED, CNN, United Nations and the sisters helped build momentum towards the ban on single use plastic bags which finally came into effect in 2018 thanks to the efforts of many like-minded organisations and individuals. The focus of Bye Bye Plastic Bags is in education through the form of workshops, presentations and booklets.

Bye Bye Plastic Bags has expanded to 60 locations around the world with teams led by young people who want to bring the message of saying no to plastic bags globally. They also began another campaign called One Island, One Voice which recognized the restaurants and markets in Bali that committed to being plastic-free.

The sisters believe in encouraging other children to help the world, and as Isabel Wijsen said in 2015:

“To all the kids of this beautiful but challenging world, go for it, make that difference.”

In 2017, the pair spoke at the United Nations World Ocean Day in New York City.

In 2018, the pair were named two of the 25 Most Influential Teens of 2018 by Time magazine.

In 2020, Melati was an invited speaker at the World Economic Forum in Davos.

In 2021, a documentary film on Melati Wijsen titled Bigger Than Us was released. The film was directed by French director Flore Vasseur and produced by Marion Cotillard.

Melati and Isabel has since founded her latest NGO, Youthtopia, a learning platform for young change makers which hosts workshops and training to equip youth to encourage them to make a difference.
