= Rebecca Kabugho =

Congolese activist (born 1994)

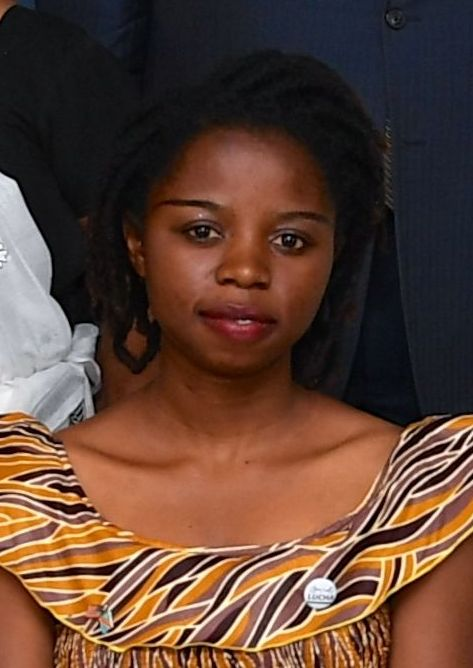
- Born: 3 September 1994 (age 31); Goma, Zaire
- Known for: "one of" the youngest prisoners of conscience

Rebecca Kabugho (born 3 September 1994) is a Congolese activist who was detained by the government. She was said to be one of the youngest prisoners of conscience and she was given an International Women of Courage Award in 2017.

== Life ==
Kabugho was born in Goma in 1994 in the Democratic Republic of the Congo. She was a member of the LUCHA (Lutte pour le changement - Struggle for Change) which had been founded in her home town in June 2012. LUCHA was a non-hierarchical non-violent movement for change.

LUCHA was opposed by Congo's National Intelligence Agency as a "insurrectionist movement". Kabugho and she was one of six members arrested on 16 February after several peaceful protests but the protest at that time was named "Dead City". She and the other five men were charged with encouraging civil disobedience over President Joseph Kabila's disregard of Congo's constitution.

She spent six months in a prison in her home town whilst being lauded on social media and the international press as "one of" the "youngest prisoner of conscience in the world".

On 19 December 2016, Rebecca was amongst 19 other activists who were arrested again for protesting against what they consider as an unconstitutional government. She was released within a week but continued to be a leading non-violent campaigner for improvements in Congo.

Kabugho was awarded an International Women of Courage Award by Melania Trump in March 2017 with twelve other women. In 2016 she was awarded International Women of Courage Award.

In 2019 Kabugho was invited to Geneva where she joined the Brazilian Hamangai Pataxo, children's rights activist Memory Banda from Malawi and Amy and Ella Meek from England at the Young Activists Summit that included the Nobel Peace laureate Nadia Murad as a special guest. They met guests at the UN office and the six each received Young Activist Awards.
