= Mr. & Mrs. Adelman =

2017 film by Nicolas Bedos

- Theatrical release poster
- French: Monsieur & Madame Adelman
- Directed by: Nicolas Bedos
- Screenplay by: Nicolas Bedos; Doria Tillier
- Dialogue by: Nicolas Bedos
- Produced by: François Kraus; Denis Pineau-Valencienne
- Starring: Doria Tillier; Nicolas Bedos; Denis Podalydès; Antoine Gouy; Christiane Millet; Pierre Arditi; Zabou Breitman; Julien Boisselier
- Cinematography: Nicolas Bolduc
- Edited by: Anny Danché; Marie Silvi
- Music by: Philippe Kelly; Nicolas Bedos
- Production companies: Les Films du Kiosque; France 2 Cinéma; Orange Studio; Le Pacte; Chaocorp Cinéma; Umedia
- Distributed by: Le Pacte
- Release date: 8 March 2017
- Running time: 120 minutes
- Country: France
- Language: French
- Budget: €5.9 million
- Box office: $2.8 million

Mr. & Mrs. Adelman (French: Monsieur & Madame Adelman) is a 2017 French romantic comedy-drama film directed by Nicolas Bedos (in his feature directorial debut), who co-wrote the screenplay with Doria Tillier. The film stars Tillier and Bedos, with Denis Podalydès, Antoine Gouy, Christiane Millet, Pierre Arditi, Zabou Breitman and Julien Boisselier in supporting roles.

== Plot ==
At the funeral of Victor Adelman, an acclaimed leftist novelist, his widow, Sarah, is approached by young journalist Antoine Grillot, who is writing a biography of Victor. In Victor's study, Sarah agrees to recount their marriage of 45 years to Antoine.

At a Paris nightclub in 1971, Sarah, a doctoral student in Classics, first meets Victor, a struggling writer from a wealthy, conservative family. She is instantly attracted to him, and he takes her to his apartment, but he passes out drunk before they can have sex. The next morning, Victor awakens to find Sarah copyediting a manuscript of his. Over the next few days, as Victor begins dating another woman, Sarah incessantly calls him until he tells her to stop calling him, which leaves her heartbroken.

In 1972, Sarah attends Victor's birthday party with his best friend, whom she is dating. On Christmas that year, Victor is surprised when his brother introduces Sarah as his new girlfriend to their family. Later that night, Victor kisses Sarah, and they soon begin a relationship, moving in together in 1973. After meeting Sarah's Jewish parents, Victor is so fascinated by them that he writes a novel about a family of Holocaust survivors and adopts Sarah's last name, Adelman. Initially angry, Sarah is moved to tears after reading his manuscript and assists him with his first novel.

Published in 1974, Victor's first novel becomes hugely successful and earns him the Prix Goncourt. Victor and Sarah marry, and in 1975, she becomes pregnant with their first child. In the hospital, while Sarah is giving birth, Victor has sex with a female fan he has met in the waiting room. In 1978, Victor and Sarah's son Arthur is diagnosed with an intellectual disability, which would become a constant source of frustration for Victor. Victor's next novel is a roman à clef about his alcoholic mother, who kills herself after reading it, devastating Victor.

With Victor enjoying growing success, Sarah quits school, and in 1980, the family move into a lavish manor in Chantilly. However, Victor declares he is bored with Sarah, feeling she has become vapid and unfunny. After Sarah reveals she is pregnant, they sell the manor and move back to Paris. Sarah develops a brief cocaine addiction, which Victor discovers as she gives birth to their daughter, Chloé.

In the mid-1990s, Victor's career begins to wane and their marriage deteriorates. One evening, Victor hires a male prostitute as Sarah's birthday gift. Humiliated, she initiates sex with the prostitute in front of Victor, who angrily throws him out before tearfully asking her to forgive him. Sarah eventually divorces Victor and marries another man, Marc. Following a period of depression, Victor retreats to Brittany and writes a book about his own life—including his marriage to Sarah—which becomes a bestseller.

In 2000, when Victor visits Marc and Sarah in Paris, Sarah leaves with Victor. Arthur moves back in with his parents until his death in 2002; Sarah is relieved, while Victor publishes the controversial novel The Son I Didn't Love. He is then elected to the Académie française. In 2003, Victor becomes a university professor and develops feelings for a student, Mélanie. After Sarah angrily throws Mélanie out of their house, a depressed Victor quits teaching and writing.

In 2016, Victor begins to suffer from dementia. Mistaking Sarah for his mother, he apologises for the novel he wrote about her; Sarah pretends to be his mother and forgives him. For Victor's birthday, Sarah takes him to Étretat, where they spent their first vacation together. To put him out of his misery, she blindfolds him and instructs him to keep walking, causing him to fall off a cliff to his death. She would later tell the police she was not with him during the incident.

Antoine remarks that Victor's writing style was not the same when he was with Sarah and when they were separated. Sarah discloses that she helped write several of Victor's books throughout his career, swearing Antoine to secrecy. After Antoine leaves, it is revealed that Sarah is ghostwriting a manuscript under Victor's name, titled A Man Under the Influence.

== Cast ==
- Doria Tillier as Sarah Adelman
- Nicolas Bedos as Victor de Richemont (later Adelman)
- Denis Podalydès as the psychiatrist
- Antoine Gouy as Antoine Grillot
- Christiane Millet as Sylvie de Richemont, Victor's mother
- Pierre Arditi as Claude de Richemont, Victor's father
- Zabou Breitman as the school director
- Julien Boisselier as Antoine de Richemont, Victor's brother
- Jean-Pierre Lorit as Marc Danchelier
- Jack Lang as himself
- Betty Reicher as Sarah's mother
- Ronald Guttman as Sarah's father
- Lucie Fagedet as Chloé at 14 years old
- Lola Bessis as Mélanie
- Julie Delarme as adult Chloé
- Ophélia Kolb as a birthday party guest

== Reception ==
=== Critical response ===
Jordan Mintzer of The Hollywood Reporter wrote, "Nicolas Bedos and Doria Tillier co-wrote and star in this sprawling dramedy about two Frenchies who spend more than 40 years in a love-hate relationship." Terry Segal of The Atlanta Jewish Times wrote, "The startling ending is gripping, and secrets are revealed. The fast-paced Mr. & Mrs. Adelman is interesting and holds the viewer's attention throughout the film." France Today wrote, "Panned by critics as self-indulgent, Nicolas Bedos's directorial debut certainly revels in wrong-footing gullible viewers."

=== Accolades ===
Award	Year	Category	Recipient(s)	Result	Ref(s)
Film by the Sea International Film Festival	2017	Le Prix TV5Monde	Nicolas Bedos	Nominated	
Hamptons International Film Festival	2017	Best Narrative Feature	Nicolas Bedos	Won	
César Awards	2018	Best Actress	Doria Tillier	Nominated	
César Awards	2018	Best First Feature Film	Nicolas Bedos	Nominated	
Globe de Cristal Awards	2018	Best Film	Nicolas Bedos	Nominated	
Globe de Cristal Awards	2018	Best Actress	Doria Tillier	Nominated	
