= Lilongwe Girls' Secondary School =

School in Lilongwe, Malawi

Lilongwe Girls Secondary School

Location
- Lilongwe; Malawi; 13.998°S 33.782°E

Information
- Established: 1962

Lilongwe Girls Secondary School is a secondary boarding school for girls, located in Lilongwe, the capital city of Malawi. The school began in 1962.

== History ==
The school was founded in 1962. In July, the British Houses of Parliament agreed various sums for girls's schools in Rhodesia and Nyasaland and £85,000 was set aside for the expansion of the existing school within the country's co-educational system by Rab Butler.

Only the very best students were selected to attend the school. Students who did exceptionally well at the school could progress to a university education at Chancellor College.

== Notable staff ==
Martha Mwale taught here before her arrest, and she later became Malawi's first Presbyterian woman parish minister. Loris Aileen Russell taught here from 1966.

== Notable alumni ==
- Emily Mkamanga, writer
- Theresa Mkandawire became a professor of civil engineering.
- Esmie Kamphata/ Tembenu (1961–2021) magistrate, was taught here.
- Colleen Zamba, politician and secretary to the president in 2026.
