= Entre ses mains =

- Directed by: Anne Fontaine
- Written by: Julien Boivent; Anne Fontaine
- Based on: Les Kangourous by Dominique Barbéris
- Produced by: Philippe Carcassonne; Bruno Pésery
- Starring: Benoît Poelvoorde; Isabelle Carré
- Cinematography: Denis Lenoir
- Edited by: Luc Barnier; Philippe Ravoet
- Music by: Pascal Dusapin
- Release date: 21 September 2005 (France)
- Running time: 90 min
- Countries: France; Belgium
- Language: French
- Budget: $5.8 million
- Box office: $2.9 million

Entre ses mains is a 2005 French-Belgian drama film directed by Anne Fontaine. It is also known as In His Hands. The screenplay was written by Fontaine and Julien Boivent.

== Plot ==
Claire Gauthier works for an insurance company. Laurent Kessler is a client. When she has to deal with him he tries to seduce her. In spite of being married and a mother, she agrees to date him. As she learns more about Kessler, she finds his behavior bizarre and comes to suspect that he might be the serial killer in the news for murdering women.

== Cast ==
- Benoît Poelvoorde as Laurent Kessler
- Isabelle Carré as Claire Gauthier
- Jonathan Zaccaï as Fabrice Gauthier
- Valérie Donzelli as Valérie
- Agathe Louvieaux as Pauline
- Bernard Bloch as directeur
- Véronique Nordey as Mme Kessler, Laurent's mother
- Michel Dubois as Claire's father
- Martine Chevallier as Claire's mother

== Awards and nominations ==
- César Awards (France)
  - Nominated: Best Actor – Leading Role (Benoît Poelvoorde)
  - Nominated: Best Actress – Leading Role (Isabelle Carré)
  - Nominated: Best Adaptation (Julien Boivent and Anne Fontaine)
- Joseph Plateau Awards (Belgium)
  - Nominated: Best Belgian Actor (Benoît Poelvoorde)
