= Esmie Tembenu =

- Born: Esmie Kamphata; 1961
- Died: 10 December 2021 (aged 59–60); Johannesburg
- Education: Lilongwe Girls Secondary School
- Occupations: magistrate, activist and TV presenter
- Known for: judge at the child justice court, TV judge
- Spouse: Elemsly Tembenu (1982–89)
- Children: five

Esmie Tembenu, born Esmie Kamphata (1961–2021) was a Malawian magistrate. She led the Child Justice Court for seven years. Her campaigning led to her presenting a weekly TV programme called "The Court" to publicise people's rights. She died in 2021 following a car accident.

== Biography ==
Tembenu was born in 1961 and was the eldest child in her family, with four younger siblings. She attended Lilongwe Girls Secondary School, but her father initially expected her to leave education and marry. As secondary education was not free and the family had limited financial resources, Tembenu pressured her mother to find money for her school fees, including by refusing to eat. After she passed the Junior Certificate of Education, her father changed his view and allowed her to continue her studies. Inspired by her headteacher, Tembenu decided to become a teacher. She completed the Malawi School Certificate of Education (MSCE) and later worked to support her siblings.

Tembenu gained admission to Lilongwe Teachers Training College but left her studies to return to work as an accounts clerk. She later married Elemsly Tembenu, and within seven years they had five children before he dies, leaving her a widow.

Tembenu was later promoted and became a judge at the child justice court. The court allowed children to give evidence through video, with a person speaking with the child while the court listened to their testimony, sometimes without the child being aware that the proceedings were taking place. Tembenu was affected by the cases she handled and hoped that a safe house could one day be established for children involved in the justice system. She noted that, in some cases, she had to send children to prison for their own protection because there were no alternative facilities available.

Tembenu was one of fifteen members of the Malawi Civil Society National Reference Group, established in 2019 to address violence against women. Other members included Zinenani Majawa, Esther Bonyonga, Barbra Banda, Chief Mlolo and Beatrice Mateyo Mkanda.

In 2021, Tembenu became the main presenter of a television show based on the American courtroom show Judge Judy, which features the resolution of real disputes. The idea for the program was developed in June 2020, with the aim of providing information and addressing issues including teenage pregnancies, child marriages, rape and defilement, which increased in Malawi following the COVID-19 pandemic.

The Malawi Broadcasting Corporation (MBC) version of the courtroom-based programme, titled The Court, used actors, although the laws and offences depicted were based on real cases. The show was supported by the Ministry of Gender and funded by MBC. The broadcaster agreed to finance the weekly half-hour show on the condition that funding would later be provided by a sponsor.

In 2021, Tembenu participated in the 16 Days of Activism against Gender-based Violence campaign. While returning home from the campaign, she was involved in a road accident while driving a vehicle carrying four other people. The vehicle left the road and overturned, leaving Tembenu seriously injured. She was taken to Nsanje District Hospital before being transferred to South Africa for further treatment. Tembenu died at Garden City Hospital in Johannesburg on 10 December 2021 and was buried in Dingisako Village in Ntcheu on 18 December.
