= No Scandal =

1999 film

- Directed by: Benoît Jacquot
- Written by: Benoît Jacquot; Jérôme Beaujour
- Produced by: Georges Benayoun; Philippe Carcassonne
- Starring: Fabrice Luchini; Isabelle Huppert; Vincent Lindon
- Cinematography: Romain Winding
- Edited by: Pascale Chavance
- Music by: Olivier Lebé
- Distributed by: Pathé
- Release date: 20 October 1999
- Running time: 105 minutes
- Country: France
- Language: French

No Scandal (French: Pas de scandale), also known as Keep It Quiet, is a 1999 French drama film directed by Benoît Jacquot and starring Fabrice Luchini, Isabelle Huppert and Vincent Lindon.

== Cast ==
- Fabrice Luchini as Grégoire Jeancourt
- Isabelle Huppert as Agnès Jeancourt
- Vincent Lindon as Louis Jeancourt
- Vahina Giocante as Stéphanie
- Sophie Aubry as Véronique
- Andréa Parisy as Mme. Jeancourt
- Thérèse Liotard as Mme Guérin
- Ludovic Bergery as William
- Anne Fontaine as Nathalie
- Jean Davy as Edmond
- Astrid Bas as Cécile, la soeur
- Jacqueline Jehanneuf as Alice
- Françoise Bertin
