= How I Killed My Father =

2001 film by Anne Fontaine

- French film poster
- Directed by: Anne Fontaine
- Written by: Jacques Fieschi; Anne Fontaine
- Produced by: Philippe Carcassonne
- Starring: Charles Berling; Michel Bouquet; Natacha Régnier
- Cinematography: Jean-Marc Fabre
- Edited by: Guy Lecorne
- Music by: Jocelyn Pook
- Production companies: Ciné B France 2 Cinéma
- Distributed by: Pathé (France); New Yorker Films (USA)
- Release dates: 8 August 2001 (Locarno); 19 September 2001 (France)
- Running time: 98 minutes
- Country: France
- Language: French
- Budget: $5.2 million
- Box office: $1.7 million

How I Killed My Father (French: Comment j'ai tué mon père) is a 2001 French thriller drama film directed by Anne Fontaine.

== Plot ==
Jean-Luc, an established gerontologist, has not had any contact with his father, Maurice, for many years and thinks he is dead. Jean-Luc lost touch when his father left his family to work as a physician in Africa.

Without notice, the father reappears. He is bankrupt and moves into his son's home for several days. He annoys Jean-Luc with compliments that sound like accusations. Or is it Jean-Luc that always hears irony? His wife likes the senior immediately, and even Jean-Luc's younger brother accepts him. Jean-Luc would like to kill his father but...

== Cast ==
- Charles Berling as Jean-Luc
- Michel Bouquet as Maurice
- Natacha Régnier as Isa
- Stéphane Guillon as Patrick
- Amira Casar as Myriem
- Hubert Koundé as Jean-Toussaint
- Karole Rocher as Laetitia
- François Berléand as The patient

== Reception ==
The review aggregator Rotten Tomatoes reported that 89% of critics have given the film a positive review based on 44 reviews, with an average rating of 7.2/10. The site's critics consensus reads: "How I Killed My Father is a penetrating character study of father-son ties". On Metacritic, the film has a weighted average score of 78 out of 100 based on 18 critics, indicating "generally favorable reviews".

Elvis Mitchell of The New York Times said that "[the film is a] kind of murder mystery, but eventually the only victim is the audience's interest -- the picture is uncompromising and inauspicious".

Lisa Schwarzbaum of Entertainment Weekly commented that "[t]he script is a steady accretion of small stabs to the heart, propelling the gorgeous performances of Berling, Regnier, and especially the 76-year-old French cinema veteran Bouquet, whose every faint smile is killing".

Ty Burr of The Boston Globe wrote "Hushed but scalpel-sharp drama, a [film] that'll probably send men in the audience home much quieter than they arrived".
