= Augustin (film) =

1995 film

- Theatrical poster
- Directed by: Anne Fontaine
- Written by: Anne Fontaine
- Produced by: Philippe Carcassonne; Brigitte Faure; Philippe Jacquier
- Starring: Jean-Chrétien Sibertin-Blanc
- Cinematography: Jean-Marie Dreujou
- Edited by: Sylvie Gadmer
- Release date: 14 June 1995
- Running time: 61 minutes
- Country: France
- Language: French

Augustin is a 1995 French comedy film directed by Anne Fontaine. It was screened in the Un Certain Regard section at the 1995 Cannes Film Festival.

== Cast ==
- Jean-Chrétien Sibertin-Blanc as Augustin
- Maggie Cheung as Ling
- Stéphanie Zhang as Caroline
- Guy Casabonne as Cyril Cachones
- Darry Cowl as René
- Bernard Campan as Boutinot
- Nora Habib as Shula
- Claude Pecher as M Poirer
- James Lord as American Client
- Jacqueline Vimpierre as Madam Balavoine
- Rahim Mazioud as Maitre d'hotel
- René Boulet as M. Linette
- Thierry Lhermitte as himself
