= Oh La La! =

- Film poster
- Directed by: Anne Fontaine
- Written by: Anne Fontaine; Julien Boivent
- Produced by: Philippe Carcassonne; Pascal Houzelot
- Starring: Danielle Darrieux
- Cinematography: Caroline Champetier
- Edited by: Isabelle Dedieu
- Distributed by: Haut et Court
- Release date: 24 May 2006
- Running time: 90 minutes
- Country: France
- Language: French

Oh La La! (original title: Nouvelle chance) is a 2006 French comedy-drama film directed by Anne Fontaine. It was screened out of competition at the 2006 Cannes Film Festival.

== Cast ==
- Danielle Darrieux - Odette Saint-Gilles
- Arielle Dombasle - Bettina Fleischer
- Jean-Chrétien Sibertin-Blanc - Augustin Dos Santos
- Andy Gillet - Raphaël
- Christophe Vandevelde - Franck
- Michel Baudinat - Le prêtre
- Katsuko Nakamura - Kumiko
- Øystein Singsaas - Monsieur Wulka
- Mariana Otero - Madame Da Costa
- Philippe Storez - Philippe
- Xavier Morineau - L'employé du Ritz
- Oscar Relier - Le barman du Ritz (as Oscar Reillier)
- Nabil Massad - Le client du Ritz
- Poundo Gomis - Fille casting 1
- Vanessa Navarro - Fille casting 2
