= COVID-19 pandemic in Malawi =

Aspect of viral disease pandemic

- Disease: COVID-19
- Pathogen: SARS-CoV-2
- Location: Malawi
- First outbreak: Wuhan, Hubei, China via India
- Index case: Lilongwe
- Arrival date: 2 April 2020 (6 years, 5 months and 5 days)
- Confirmed cases: 89,168
- Active cases: 596
- Recovered: 58,814
- Deaths: 2,686
- Fatality rate: 3.01%
- Vaccinations: 5,433,538 (total vaccinated); 4,288,014 (fully vaccinated); 8,503,954 (doses administered)

Government website
- http://covid19.health.gov.mw

The COVID-19 pandemic in Malawi is part of the worldwide pandemic of coronavirus disease 2019 (COVID-19) caused by severe acute respiratory syndrome coronavirus 2 (SARS-CoV-2). The virus was confirmed to have reached Malawi on 2 April 2020. It has spread to all districts of Malawi.

== Background ==
On 12 January 2020, the World Health Organization (WHO) confirmed that a novel coronavirus was the cause of a respiratory illness in a cluster of people in Wuhan City, Hubei Province, China, which was reported to the WHO on 31 December 2019.

The case fatality ratio for COVID-19 has been much lower than SARS of 2003, but the transmission has been significantly greater, with a significant total death toll. Model-based simulations for Malawi indicate that the 95% confidence interval for the time-varying reproduction number R_{t} was stable below 1.0 from July to September 2020 but exceeded 1.0 the last three months of 2020.

== Timeline ==
=== April to June 2020 ===
- President Peter Mutharika confirmed the country's first three cases of coronavirus disease 2019 on 2 April. The three cases include a Malawian of Asian origin who travelled back from India, her relative and their housemaid.
- A fourth case was confirmed on 4 April which involved an individual who had recently returned from the UK. A fifth case involved a woman who had returned from the UK and had quarantined some weeks earlier. On 7 April, it was announced that she had died. Malawi has identified three more cases, making a total of 8. One is of a 34-year-old who had immediate contact with the first case that was registered on 2 April, the second involved a 28-year-old lady who traveled from the UK on 19 March, whereas the third case was of a 30-year-old gentleman who traveled to South Africa on 16 March.
- Throughout April there were 37 confirmed cases, three deaths and 7 recoveries, leaving 27 active cases at the end of the month.
- In May there were 247 new cases, bringing the total number of confirmed cases to 284. One patient died, raising the death toll to four. The number of recovered patients rose by 35 to 42, leaving 238 active cases at the end of the month.
- In June there were 940 new cases, bringing the total number of confirmed cases to 1,224. The death toll rose to 14. The number of recovered patients increased by 218 to 260, leaving 950 active cases at the end of the month.

=== July to September 2020 ===
- Following over 70 deaths, Janet Banda, who was the Deputy chief secretary to the government, announced in July measures to handle the COVID-19 pandemic. Civil servants were advised to stay at home as Capitol Hill was in lockdown. Offices would be disinfected and essential work would continue on 27 July.
- There were 2,854 new cases in July, raising the total number of confirmed cases to 4,078. The death toll rose by 100 to 114. The number of recovered patients increased by 1,615 to 1,875, leaving 2,089 active cases by the end of the month (up by 120% from the end of June).
- On 8 August, the recovery rate exceeded 50% for the first time. There were 1,488 new cases in August, raising the total number of confirmed cases to 5,566. The death toll rose to 175. At the end of the month there were 2,231 active cases.
- There were 206 new cases in September, bringing the total number of confirmed cases to 5,772. The death toll rose to 179. The number of recovered patients increased to 4,245, leaving 1,348 active cases at the end of the month.

=== October to December 2020 ===
- There were 158 new cases in October, bringing the total number of confirmed cases to 5,930. The death toll rose to 184. The number of recovered patients increased to 5,323, leaving 423 active cases at the end of the month.
- A large increase in the suicide rate (as much as 57% according to Malawi police) has been attributed to the economic downturn caused by the pandemic.
- There were 98 new cases in November, bringing the total number of confirmed cases to 6,028. The death toll rose to 185. The number of recovered patients increased to 5,455, leaving 388 active cases at the end of the month.
- There were 555 new cases in December, taking the total number of confirmed cases to 6,583. The death toll rose to 189. The number of recovered patients increased to 5,705, leaving 689 active cases at the end of the month.
- Among those who died from COVID-19 was Tarcisius Gervazio Ziyaye, 71, archbishop of Roman Catholic Archdiocese of Lilongwe (since 2001).

=== 2021 ===
- The country went into lockdown on 18 January, the first time since the pandemic began. By then Malawi had recorded 12,470 coronavirus cases and 314 deaths, with a 40% increase in infections in a month. Zinenani Majawa and the Female Sex Workers Association (FSWA) organised protests regarding restrictions on human contact. Majawa argued that they would be used by the police to restrict the ability of sex workers to make a living.
- Mass vaccination started on 11 March, initially with 360,000 doses of AstraZeneca's Covishield vaccine.
- The Ministry of Health announced on 14 April that more than 16,000 doses of the Covishield vaccine would be destroyed as they were about to expire.
- Malawi's first three cases of the Omicron variant were reported on 9 December.
- There were 68,492 confirmed cases in 2021, bringing the total number of confirmed cases to 75,075. 2,175 persons died, bringing the death toll to 2,364. Among the fatalities were two Cabinet ministers, Lingson Belekanyama and Sidik Mia, both of whom died from Covid-related complications on 12 January. The number of recovered patients increased to 60,145, leaving 12,334 active cases at the end of the year.
- Modelling by WHO's Regional Office for Africa suggests that due to under-reporting, the true cumulative number of infections by the end of 2021 was around 8.6 million while the true number of COVID-19 deaths was around 10,493.

=== 2022 ===
- There were 13,089 confirmed cases in 2022, bringing the total number of cases to 88,164. 321 persons died, bringing the death toll to 2,685.

=== 2023 ===
- As of 20 December 2023 the total number of cases was 89,162, and the total death toll 2,686.

== Government response ==
Despite there being no confirmed cases prior to 2 April 2020, President Mutharika declared the coronavirus pandemic a national disaster. Some of the measures that were put in place included the banning of gatherings of more than 100 people in places such as churches, rallies, weddings and funerals. He also instructed that both public and private education institutions be closed from 23 March. He further urged the government to suspend the hosting of international meetings and banned public servants from attending regional and international meetings. He called upon returning residents and nationals coming from affected countries to subject themselves to either self- or institutional quarantine.

It was only after the first four cases were identified in April that Mutharika instituted new measures which included the suspension of all formal meetings, gatherings and conferences. He further directed the Malawi Prison Services and Juvenile Centres to present a list of prisoners and juveniles who committed "petty offences" including those that have served a significant portion of their sentences for moderate crimes to the Minister of Homeland Security in order to decongest the overpopulation of the country's prisons. Other measures have included the slashing of fuel prices as well as placing a waiver on the non-tourist levy to support the tourism industry, including a waiver of the resident tax on all foreign doctors and medical personnel. The Treasury has been called upon to reduce the salaries of the President, Cabinet and deputy ministers by 10 percent for three months in order to redirect the resources to fight against the coronavirus. The Malawi Revenue Authority was instructed to open up a voluntary tax compliance window for a period of six months so as to allow taxpayers with arrears to settle their tax obligations. Mutharika called upon all offices to work in shifts except those working in essential services in order to mitigate the congestion in the workplaces. On 14 April, President Mutharika announced a 21-day lockdown starting Saturday 18 April at midnight. However, on 17 April, the Malawi High Court temporarily barred the government from implementing the 21-day lockdown following a petition by the Human Rights Defenders Coalition. The argument made by the Human Rights Defenders Coalition was that more consultation was needed to prevent harm to the poorest and most vulnerable of society.

== See also ==
- COVID-19 pandemic in Africa
- COVID-19 pandemic by country and territory
