= Yashira Jordán =

Bolivian director, scriptwriter and film editor

- Born: September 23, 1985 (age 39); La Paz, Bolivia
- Occupation(s): Director, scriptwriter, film editor.

Yashira Jordán (La Paz, September 23, 1985) is a Bolivian director, scriptwriter and film editor.

== Background ==
Jordán is the director of Durazno (film) first film in Bolivia and Argentina, which is performed under the concept of crowd funding and which used garbage and rubbish to construct the fiction sequence and sets of the film.

== Career ==
In 2004 Jordán spent time in New York City, Washington, D.C., and Mexico City, training in various workshops and courses under the direction of American and Mexican filmmakers. In addition she made some experimental videos and shorts (35 mm film format) that participated in international festivals, such as the Washington, D.C., 48 hour Film Festival.

In 2005 she began her degree in audiovisual communication at the Universidad Nacional de La Plata, Argentina. In 2007 she was chosen to participate in Talent Campus, organised by the Universidad del Cine, exhibiting her work to mark the 9th BAFICI (Buenos Aires International Independent Film Festival) In addition, in February 2008 her work was selected from amongst more than 3,000 worldwide participants for the Berlin International Film Festival, in the Talent Campus category. She attended talks, meetings and workshops with cineastes and cinematographers like Mike Leigh, Lucrecia Martel, Wim Wenders, Alejandro Jodorowsky, Lisandro Alonso, Felix Monti, Alex McDowell and Andrej Wajda. at the Berlinale Talent Campus.

=== Movies ===
Feature-length filmography

- Durazno (2012)
