= Bigger Than Us (film) =

2021 documentary film by Flore Vasseur

- Theatrical release poster
- Directed by: Flore Vasseur
- Written by: Flore Vasseur; Melati Wijsen
- Produced by: Denis Carot; Flore Vasseur; Marion Cotillard
- Starring: Melati Wijsen; Xiuhtezcatl Martinez; Memory Banda; René Silva; Mohamad Al Jounde; Mary Finn; Winnie Tushabe
- Cinematography: Christophe Offenstein; Tess Barthes
- Edited by: Aurélie Jourdan
- Music by: Rémi Boubal
- Production companies: Elzévir Films; Big Mother Productions; All You Need Is Prod; France 2 Cinéma
- Distributed by: jour2fête
- Release dates: 10 July 2021 (Cannes Film Festival); 22 September 2021 (France)
- Running time: 96 minutes
- Country: France
- Language: English
- Box office: $1 million

Bigger Than Us is a 2021 French documentary film produced and directed by Flore Vasseur, co-produced by Marion Cotillard, and written by Vasseur and Melati Wijsen. The film made its world premiere at the 2021 Cannes Film Festival in the special section Cinema for the Climate on 10 July 2021. It was released theatrically in France by Jour2fête on 22 September 2021. It was nominated for the César Award for Best Documentary Film in 2022.

== Plot ==
The documentary follows Melati Wijsen, an 18-year-old Indonesian girl and well-established activist against plastic pollution in her country. She wants to understand how to hold on and continue her action, so she goes on to meet six other young activists across the globe.

== Cast ==
- Melati Wijsen
- Xiuhtezcatl Martinez
- Memory Banda
- René Silva
- Mohamad Al Jounde
- Mary Finn
- Saad Kassis-Mohamed
- Winnie Tushabe

== Release ==
The film made its world premiere at the 74th Cannes Film Festival in the special section Cinema for the Climate on 10 July 2021. It was released theatrically in France by Jour2fête on 22 September 2021.

== Reception ==
=== Critical response ===
AlloCiné, a French cinema website, gave the film an average rating of 3.3/5, based on a survey of 12 French reviews.

== Home media ==
The film was released on DVD in France on 1 February 2022. The extras include an interview with director Flore Vasseur, a debate with Mary Finn and Mohamad Al Jounde, a podcast and the webseries "It starts with you".

== Awards and nominations ==
Award	Year	Category	Recipient(s)	Result
Dei Popoli Festival	2021	Young Jury Award	Bigger Than Us	Won
Medal of the National Assembly	2021	N/A	Bigger Than Us	Won
César Awards	2022	Best Documentary Film	Flore Vasseur and Denis Carot	Nominated
Better World Fund	2022	Best Commitment	Flore Vasseur	Won
Better World Fund	2022	Best Achievement	Marion Cotillard	Won
Cinema For Change	2022	Honorary Award	Flore Vasseur	Won
Festival À Travers Champs	2022	Commitment Award	Bigger Than Us	Won
Reel 2 Real Youth Festival	2022	Edith Lando Peace Prize	Bigger Than Us	Won
