= Durazno (film) =

- Directed by: Yashira Jordan
- Written by: Yashira Jordan; José Ángel Esteban
- Produced by: Fernanda Peñarrieta; Gabriel Pastore; Yashira Jordan
- Starring: Nahuel Pérez Biscayart; Ezequiel W. Gonzalez
- Cinematography: Germán Peters; Leandro Monti
- Edited by: Natacha Valerga
- Music by: Kostas Kakouris; Don Cairo; Óscar García
- Production companies: Arbol; Carrousel Films
- Release date: 2014
- Running time: 70 minutes
- Countries: Bolivia; Argentina
- Language: Spanish
- Budget: $30,000 (est)

Durazno (Spanish for 'Peach'), also known in English as Apricot, is a documentary film directed by Yashira Jordan. The film utilized crowd-funding and ecological production, and is one of the first of its type to be made in Bolivia and Argentina.

The documentary was filmed during 2012 in the Argentinian cities of Santa Fe and La Plata, as well as in Cochabamba, Bolivia.

== Plot ==
The documentary follows Ezequiel W. Gonzalez and Nahuel Pérez Biscayart as they set out on a road trip together. The two are both in search of something: W. Gonzalez is looking for his biological father while Biscayart is studying him with the intent of basing a character off of him. Both men suffer from issues stemming from identity. W. Gonzalez has to deal with the long-term effects of his abandonment as an infant by his mother, the lack of any clear knowledge of who his father is, and the mysterious death of his adopted father. Meanwhile, Biscayart struggles to identify his character, W. Gonzalez, and ultimately himself.

== Cast ==
- Nahuel Pérez Biscayart as Ezequiel
- Ezequiel Kruger as Himself

== Soundtrack ==
- "Walilamdzi", Written by Devendra Banhart, performed by Devendra Banhart, courtesy of Warner Music
- "Hindue Blues", written by Kevin Johansen, performed by Kevin Johansen & The Nada, Courtesy of Kevin Johansen
- "Si Aún Me Quieres", written by Adanowsky, performed by Adanowsky, Courtesy of Adanowsky
- "Acid Rain", written by The Growlers, performed by The Growlers, courtesy of Everloving

== Accolades ==
- 2011, won Bolivia Lab national award "Best Bolivian Project"
- 2013, selection Visions du Reel Doc in Progress
