= Beatrice Mateyo =

Malawian human rights defender and gender equality advocate

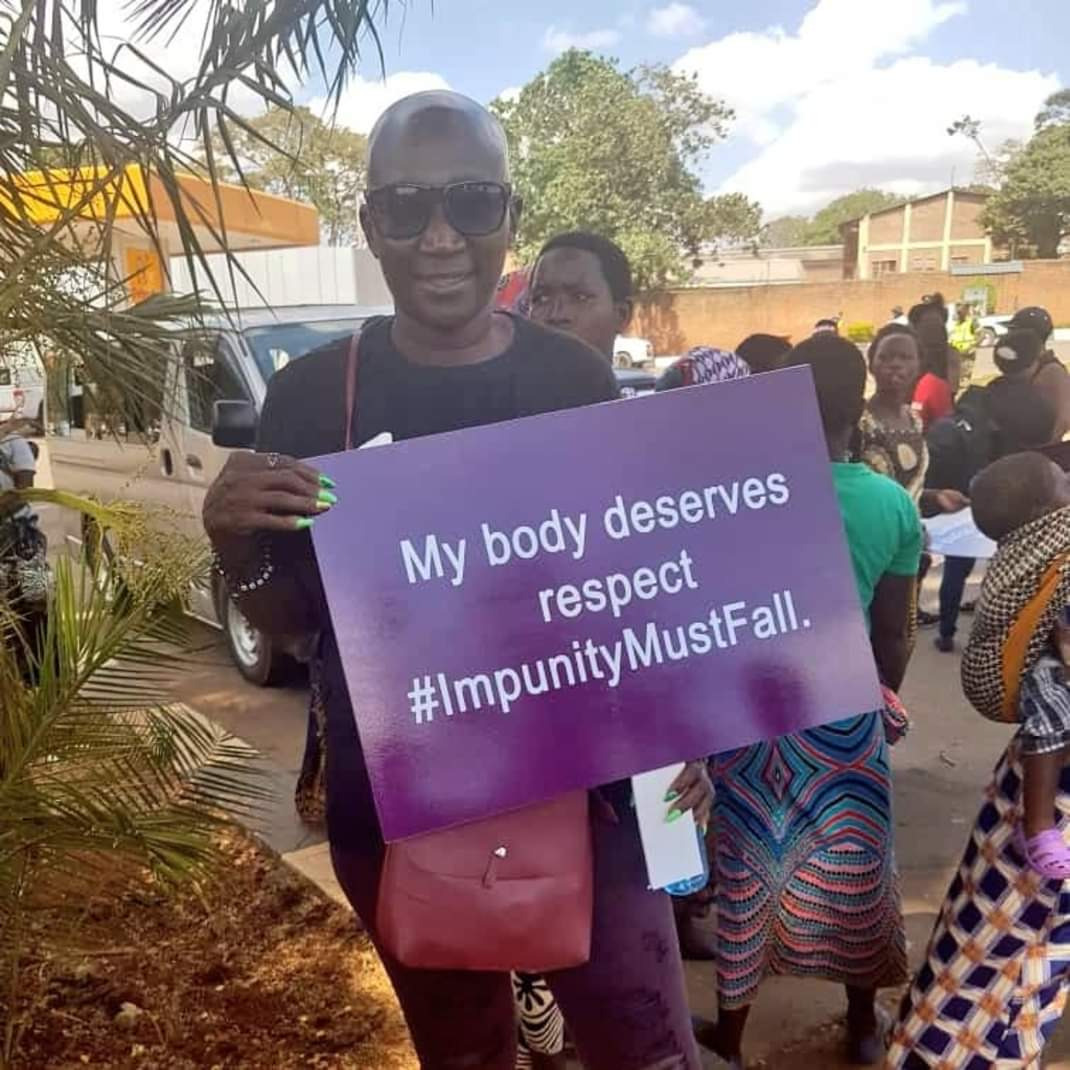
- Mateyo in 2026
- Education: University College Dublin (MA in Women, Gender and Society)
- Occupations: Human rights defender, gender equality advocate
- Organization(s): Coalition for the Empowerment of Women and Girls (CEWAG)
- Known for: Freedom of expression case following her 2017 arrest during a gender-based violence march

Beatrice Mateyo is a Malawian human rights and gender equality advocate. She is the Executive Director of the Coalition for the Empowerment of Women and Girls (CEWAG). In 2017, she was arrested after participating in a march against gender-based violence while carrying a placard reading Kubadwa ndi nyini sitchimo ('Being born with a vagina is not a sin'). Her subsequent legal challenge to the arrest raised constitutional questions concerning freedom of expression and the offence of "insulting the modesty of a woman".

== Early life and education ==
Mateyo studied gender and social development, with a focus on women's rights and gender equality. In 2011, while working with the Justice and Peace programme of the Episcopal Conference of Malawi, she was awarded an Irish Aid Fellowship to pursue postgraduate studies at University College Dublin. She completed a Master of Arts degree in Women, Gender and Society during the 2012–2013 academic year. Her master's research examined gender relations and power dynamics in Malawian marriages. Her thesis, titled Finding Ways of Saying NO! Investigating Social Processes, Gender Relations and Power in Malawian Marriages, was published in 2013.

== Career ==
Before pursuing postgraduate studies, Mateyo worked with the Episcopal Conference of Malawi in its Justice and Peace programmes, where she served as a Gender Programmes Coordinator. In this role, she supported gender mainstreaming across programmes focused on areas including food security, advocacy and health.

After completing her studies, Mateyo worked as a Social and Gender Assessment Officer with Millennium Challenge Account Malawi, where she supported efforts to promote gender equality and social inclusion within development projects.

=== Coalition for the Empowerment of Women and Girls ===
Mateyo serves as the Executive Director of the Coalition for the Empowerment of Women and Girls (CEWAG), an organisation that works on issues affecting women and girls, including gender-based violence, child protection and women's empowerment. Through her role at CEWAG, Mateyo has advocated for measures aimed at protecting girls' rights, including addressing child marriage, promoting girls' education and strengthening responses to gender-based violence. In 2021, she called for increased awareness on child protection and urged greater investment in girls' education and measures to prevent child marriage.

In Mzimba District, Mateyo highlighted the importance of women's financial independence in enabling women to make decisions about their lives and reducing vulnerability to gender-based violence through CEWAG's women's economic empowerment and gender-based violence prevention programmes.

== Advocacy for gender equality ==
As Executive Director of CEWAG, Mateyo has spoken publicly on gender equality, gender-based violence, child protection and women's political participation in Malawi. In 2020, she said that persistent cases of rape and defilement were driven in part by harmful gender norms and attitudes that blame survivors of sexual violence. She called for stronger accountability for perpetrators and greater efforts to promote gender equality and protect the rights of women and girls. She was also one of the fifteen members of the Malawi Civil Society National Reference Group which had been established to counter violence against women in 2019. The other members included Esmie Tembenu, Esther Bonyonga, Barbra Banda, Chief Mlolo and Zinenani Majawa.

In 2021, Mateyo, speaking as a member of the Human Rights Defenders Coalition (HRDC), welcomed the findings of a Malawi Human Rights Commission investigation into allegations of sexual harassment at the Malawi Broadcasting Corporation. She said the report confirmed the existence of workplace sexual harassment at the institution and supported the commission's recommendation that institutions be audited for compliance with the Gender Equality Act, describing the proposed audits as an important step towards strengthening workplace protections against sexual harassment.

In 2025, she criticised the underrepresentation of women among presidential candidates in Malawi's 2025 general elections. She argued that increasing women's political participation required addressing structural barriers, including limited access to funding and support for women candidates. Later that year, at a leadership training meeting for female leaders in Lilongwe District, Mateyo highlighted challenges faced by women in leadership positions, including cultural biases and stereotypes. She called for policies that support women's participation in leadership and decision-making processes.

== 2017 arrest and constitutional challenge ==
On 14 September 2017, Mateyo participated in a march in Lilongwe organised to protest gender-based violence in Malawi. During the demonstration, she carried a placard written in Chichewa and English that attracted criticism from police officials, who considered it offensive. The placard read "Kubadwa ndi nyini sitchimo" ("Being born with a vagina is not a sin"), followed by the English sentence "My pussy my pride". The Inspector General of Police, Lexten Kachama, ordered the placard to be removed, describing it as demeaning to women. Mateyo was subsequently arrested by police during the demonstration.

Police detained Mateyo at Lingadzi Police Station and charged her with "insulting the modesty of a woman" under section 137(3) of the Penal Code. After being released on police bail, she filed an application for judicial review challenging the legality of her arrest and detention and questioning the constitutionality of the offence under which she had been charged.

The legal challenge raised questions about the relationship between freedom of expression, gender equality advocacy and the rights of women human rights defenders. Mateyo was represented by lawyers from the Women Lawyers Association Malawi, with support from the Southern Africa Litigation Centre.
