= Florence Kabugho =

Ugandan politician and journalist

Kabugho Florence
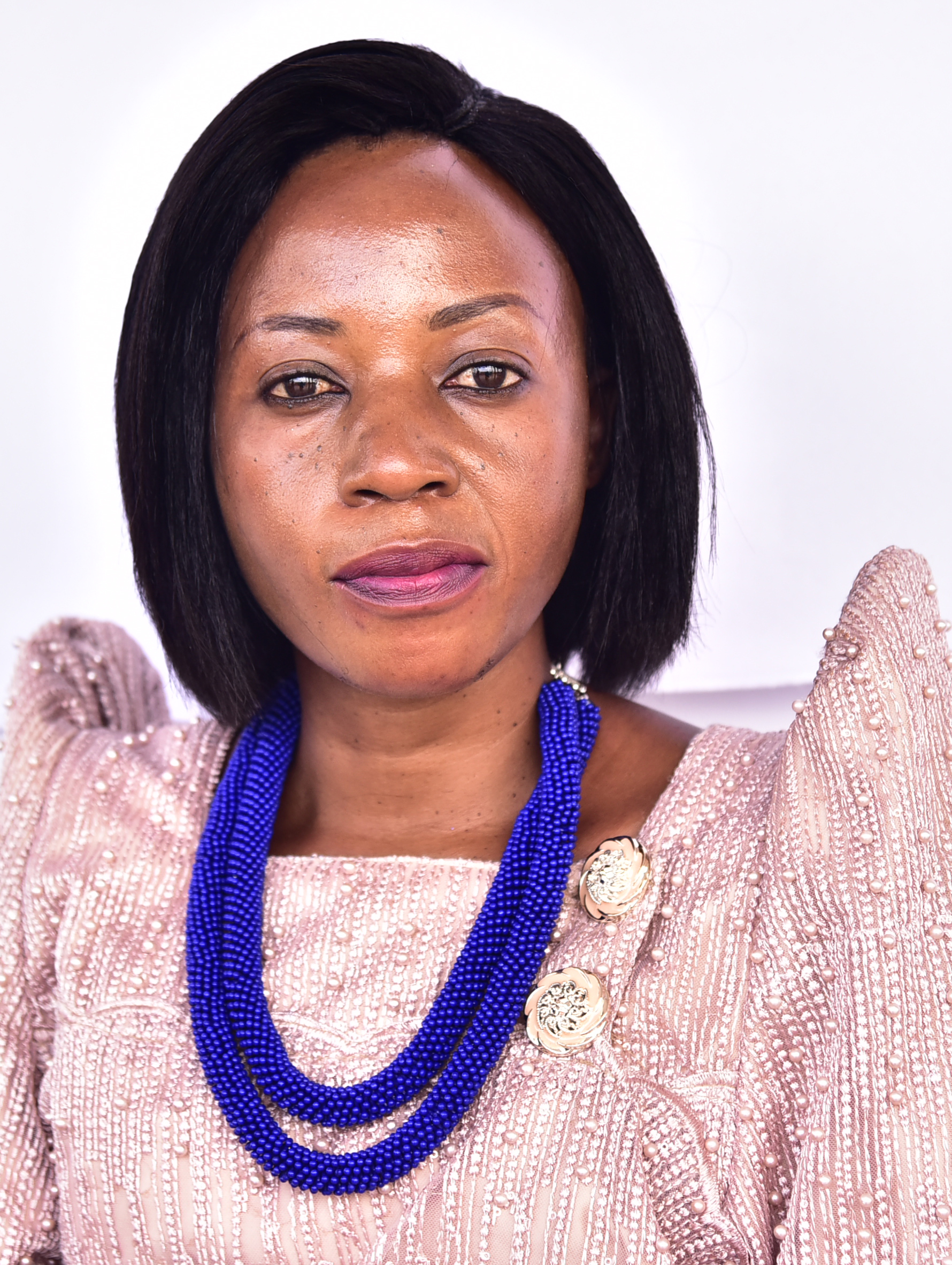
- Constituency: Kasese Municipality

Personal details
- Born: Kasese, Uganda
- Party: Forum for Democratic Change
- Occupation: Politician, Journalist
- Known for: Member of Parliament

Florence Kabugho is a Ugandan politician and former radio journalist, elected to the eleventh Parliament of Uganda in the 2021 general election, as the woman representative for Kasese District.

== Life ==
Before entering politics Florence was a radio journalist. She resigned from a job at Radio Uganda to work for Messiah FM in the Rwenzori sub-region. She worked for Omusinga Charles Mumbere of Rwenzururu, in several roles, including Deputy Kingdom Spokesperson, Minister for Gender and Protocol Minister. When the palace was attacked and Mumbere arrested in 2016 she almost lost her life.

In July 2020 Winnie Kiiza announced her retirement from elective politics, after fifteen years as MP for Kasese District. Florence Kabugho was one of four candidates to succeed Kiiza in the FDC nomination. She secured the Forum for Demoocratic Change (FDC) nomination in the August 2020 FDC primaries, winning 259 votes against Catherine Muhindo (111 votes), Ruth Kabguho (54 votes) and Annet Night (39 votes).

In November 2020 Kabugho was among FDC candidates blocked by police from launching their manifestos at playgrounds in Karambi sub-county. She said that her manifesto priorities were education for girls and local health facilities. After Kizza Besigye's decision not to run for the presidency in the 2021 election, Kabugho predicted that the FDC would keep its parliamentary support in Kasese.

Florence was elected to Parliament in the 2021 general election, as the women's representative for Kasese District. As the FDC lost three other seats in Kasese to the NRM, local opposition parties joined forces for the local council and mayoral elections.

In the 2026 general elections she lost her bid for re-election and was succeeded by Hon. Sarah Ithungu Masereka, who serves as a woman MP for Kasese district in the 12th Parliament2026-2031.
