= Presidents (film) =

2021 film

- French: Présidents
- Directed by: Anne Fontaine
- Written by: Anne Fontaine
- Produced by: Philippe Carcassonne
- Starring: Jean Dujardin; Grégory Gadebois
- Cinematography: Yves Angelo
- Edited by: Fabrice Rouaud
- Music by: Vincent Blanchard
- Production company: Ciné@
- Distributed by: Universal Pictures International France
- Release date: 30 June 2021 (France)
- Running time: 100 minutes
- Country: France
- Language: French
- Box office: $3.6 million

Presidents (French: Présidents) is a 2021 French political satire film written and directed by Anne Fontaine. Although it was promoted with the disclaimer that "any resemblance to real persons is purely coincidental", the film stars Jean Dujardin and Grégory Gadebois in roles inspired by former French presidents Nicolas Sarkozy and François Hollande, respectively. It was theatrically released in France on 30 June 2021.

== Cast ==
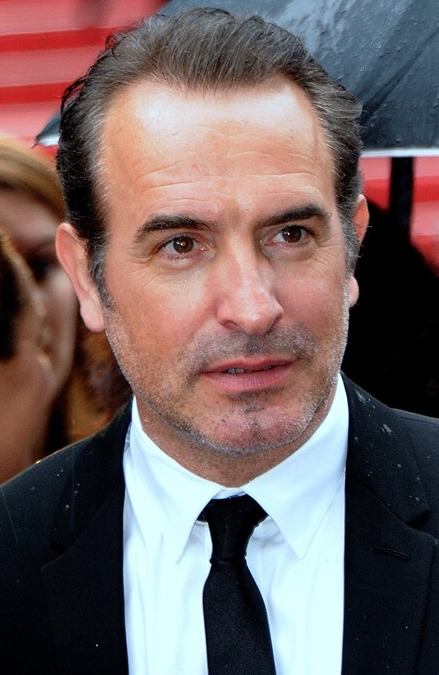
Jean Dujardin

- Jean Dujardin as Nicolas
- Grégory Gadebois as François
- Doria Tillier as Nathalie
- Pascale Arbillot as Isabelle
- Jean-Charles Clichet as Damien
- Pierre Lottin as Balthazar
- Roxane Bret as Natacha
- Jean-Michel Lahmi as Jean-Jacques
- Denis Podalydès as Le coach
- Jean-Chrétien Sibertin-Blanc as Le moine guide touristique

== Production ==
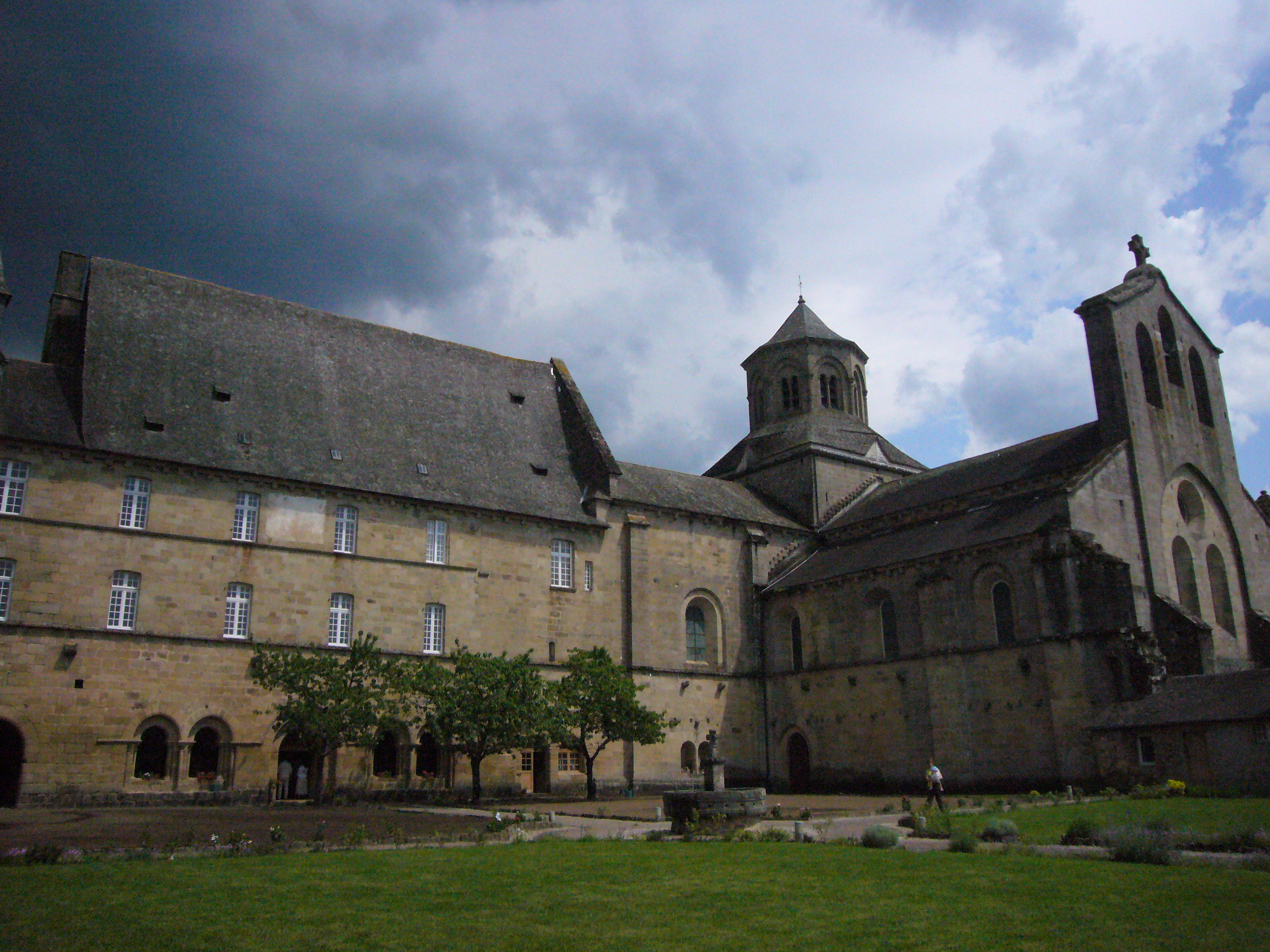
Aubazine Abbey, where some of the scenes of the film were shot.

In August 2020, director Anne Fontaine revealed that she developed the idea for the screenplay during the first COVID-19 lockdown in France:

The lockdown stimulated me into the idea of a different time. It was quite exhilarating to take advantage of a time not planned for writing and to create something unexpected. It's not representative of this period but I wanted something like a comedy, whether it's light, whether it's funny, something whimsical.

The project was described as a comedy about "[the] power and the difficulty of no longer being in charge [...] it is the meeting of two political adversaries who will live an adventure of sorts".

Presidents was produced by Philippe Carcassonne at Ciné@. The film was shot over a seven-week period in Corrèze and Paris, with Yves Angelo as director of photography. Principal photography began on 5 October 2020, and concluded in mid-November 2020.

== Release ==
The film was theatrically released by Universal Pictures International France on 30 June 2021.

== Reception ==
=== Box office ===
Presidents grossed $3.6 million in France, and $0 in other territories, for a worldwide total of $3.6 million.

In France, the film opened alongside Peter Rabbit 2: The Runaway, Le Sens de la famille, Hitman's Wife's Bodyguard, The Deep House, The Rose Maker, Teddy, and Charlatan. The film sold 41,241 admissions on its first day, 4,623 of which were preview screenings. It went on to sell 213,699 admissions in its opening weekend, finishing 5th at the box office, behind Cruella, Peter Rabbit 2: The Runaway, The Conjuring: The Devil Made Me Do It, and Le Sens de la famille. At the end of its theatrical run, the film sold a total of 431,129 admissions.

=== Critical response ===
Presidents received an average rating of 3.5 out of 5 stars on the French website AlloCiné, based on 30 reviews.
