= Doria Tillier =

French actress (born 1986)

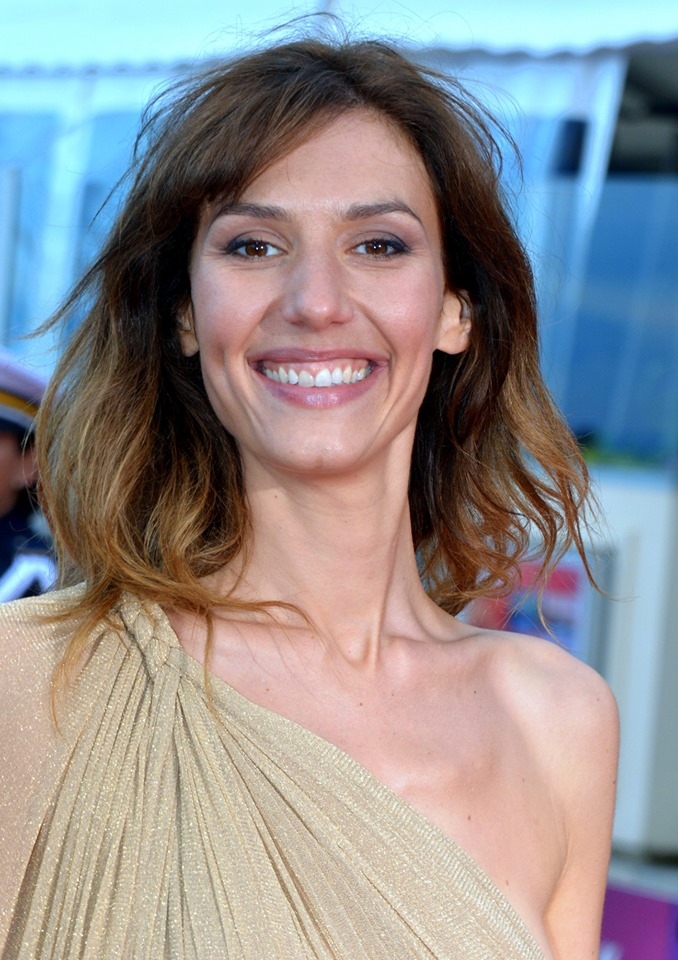
- Tillier at the 2019 Cabourg Film Festival
- Born: 27 March 1986 (age 40); Paris, France
- Education: Lycée Condorcet
- Occupation: Actress

Doria Tillier (born 27 March 1986) is a French actress.

== Early life and education ==
Tillier was born in the 14th arrondissement of Paris to a mathematician father and a mother who restores paintings. She attended one of the oldest and most prestigious high schools in France, Lycée Condorcet, in Paris. After she graduated, she worked as a waitress.

From 2008 to 2010, Tillier studied acting at the Laboratoire de l'acteur-Hélène Zidi with Hélène Zidi.

== Career ==
Tillier began her career acting in short films as well as commercials, including Nina Ricci's perfume Mademoiselle Ricci. In 2008, she appeared as a coroner in the thriller Bloody Flowers directed by Richard J. Thomson and starring Amanda Lear. In 2009, she played in the series Action spéciale douanes aired on France 2.

In September 2012, she became a witty weather girl on a famous access prime time TV show called Le Grand Journal on Canal+, succeeding Solweig Rediger-Lizlow. She left the program in June 2014.

During the same period, Tillier also appeared in the second version of the sketch show Le Débarquement on Canal+ in December 2013. She was the mistress of ceremonies of the thirtieth anniversary of Canal+ in November 2014. In June 2015, on the occasion of the ten years of the popular TV show Salut les Terriens!, she performed a song in homage to the star presenter Thierry Ardisson with music by Barbara, written by Nicolas Bedos who accompanied with the piano.

In March 2017, Tillier starred in the leading role in the film M. & Mme Adelman, directed and co-starred by her former companion Nicolas Bedos, with a screenplay written by them both.

== Filmography ==
Year	Title	Role	Notes
2008	Bloody Flowers	Coroner	
2009	Action spéciale douanes	Lisa Schmidt	
2013	Le Débarquement 1 & 2		Canal+
2017	Monsieur & Madame Adelman	Sarah Adelman	
2018	Le Jeu	Léa	
2019	Yves	So	
2019	La Belle Époque	Margot	
2021	Presidents	Natalie	
2022	Canailles	Lucie	
2022	The Origin of Evil (L'Origine du mal)	George	
2022	Smoking causes coughing (Fumer fait tousser)	Agathe	

== Awards and nominations ==
Year	Work	Association	Category	Result
2017	Monsieur & Madame Adelman	Cabourg Film Festival	Swann d'Or for Female Revelation	Won
2018	Monsieur & Madame Adelman	Globe de Cristal Awards	Best Actress	Nominated
2018	Monsieur & Madame Adelman	César Award	Best Actress	Nominated
