= Flore Vasseur =

French film director

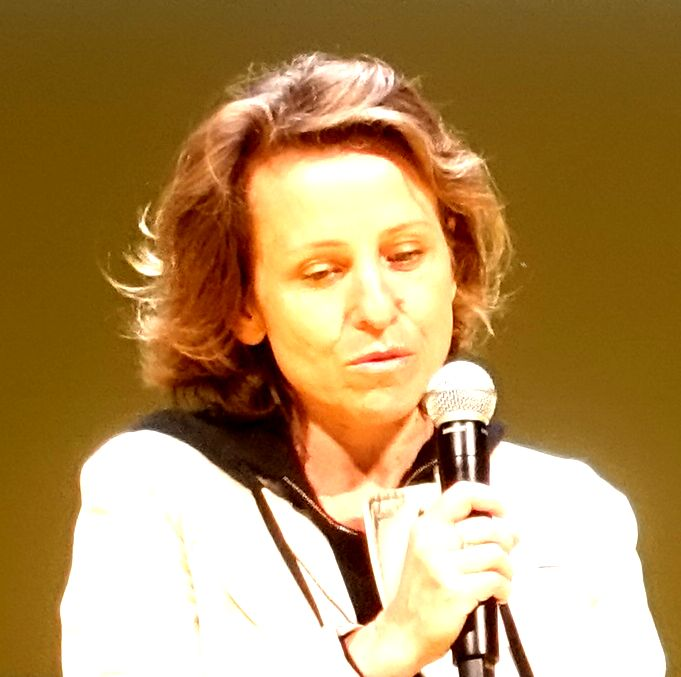
- Vasseur in 2019
- Born: 1973 (age 52–53); Annecy, France
- Education: HEC Paris; Grenoble Institute of Political Studies
- Occupations: Film director; screenwriter; film producer; novelist; journalist; entrepreneur
- Years active: 2006–present
- Children: 2
- Website: https://florevasseur.com

Flore Vasseur (born 1973) is a French film director, screenwriter, film producer, novelist, journalist and entrepreneur. Her first feature-length documentary film, Bigger Than Us (2021), premiered in the Cinema for the Climate section at the 2021 Cannes Film Festival and was nominated for the 2022 César Award for Best Documentary Film.

== Personal life ==
Vasseur is a former snowboard champion. She graduated in Business and Marketing at HEC Paris, and in Political Studies at the Grenoble Institute of Political Studies. Vasseur lives in France and has two children.

== Filmography ==
=== Documentaries ===
- 2017: Meeting Snowden (medium-length film)
- 2021: Bigger Than Us

=== Television ===
- 2009: TED: 18 minutes pour changer le monde (short film): co-director and writer
- 2013: Les Insoumises (documentary): writer
- 2015–2016: The Last Panthers (mini-series): script consultant

== Books ==
- Une fille dans la ville (2006)
- Comment j’ai liquidé le siècle (2010)
- En bande organisée (2013)
- Ce qu'il reste de nos rêves (2019)
- Et maintenant, que faisons-nous ? (2024)

== Awards and nominations ==
Award	Year	Category	Nominated work	Result	Ref.
Better World Fund	2022	Best Achievement	Bigger Than Us	Won	
César Awards	2022	Best Documentary Film	Bigger Than Us	Nominated	
Cinema For Change	2022	Honorary Award	Bigger Than Us	Won	
