= Anne Fontaine =

Luxembourgish film director

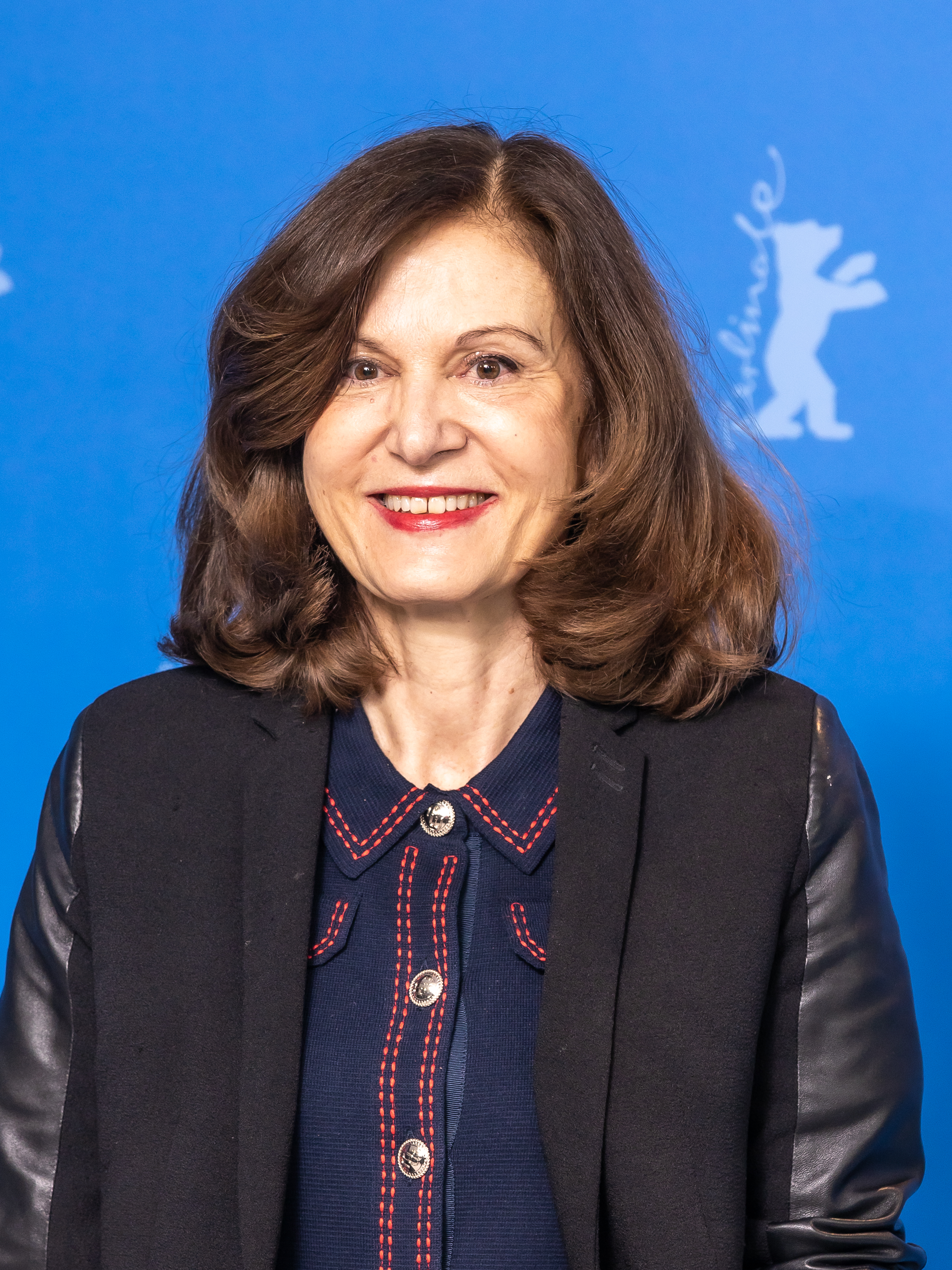
- Fontaine in 2020
- Born: Anne-Fontaine Sibertin-Blanc; 15 July 1959 (age 67); Luxembourg City, Luxembourg
- Occupations: Film director, screenwriter, actress
- Years active: 1980–present
- Spouse: Philippe Carcassonne (m. 1994)
- Children: 1

Anne Fontaine, born Anne-Fontaine Sibertin-Blanc (French: [an fɔ̃tɛn]; 15 July 1959), is a Luxembourgish film director, screenwriter, and former actress. She lives and works in France.

== Life and career ==
Born Anne-Fontaine Sibertin-Blanc in Luxembourg, sister of actor Jean-Chrétien Sibertin-Blanc, she went as a young child to live in Lisbon, where her father, Antoine Sibertin-Blanc, is a music professor and cathedral organist. In adolescence she moved to Paris and trained in dance with Joseph Russillo while continuing her academic education, including philosophy. Her husband is Philippe Carcassonne, the film producer, and they have an adopted son, Tienne, who was born in Cambodia.

While still dancing, she was picked by Robert Hossein to play Esmeralda in a 1980 theatrical production of The Hunchback of Notre-Dame and around this time started to use the name Anne Fontaine. She continued with acting and became known for her roles in comedies like Si ma gueule vous plaît... (1981) and P.R.O.F.S.(1985). An opportunity to be assistant director came with a 1986 stage version of Louis-Ferdinand Céline's Journey to the End of the Night at the Renaud-Barrault theatre.

Fontaine's first project as solo director, Les Histoires d'amour finissent mal... en général (Love Affairs Usually End Badly), won the 1993 Prix Jean Vigo. In 1995, she worked with her brother on the comedy Augustin. Two years later, she wrote and directed the successful Dry Cleaning (Nettoyage à Sec). It won the Best Screenplay award at the 1997 Venice Film Festival and is generally considered a milestone on Fontaine's way to becoming "an important figure in contemporary French cinema".

In 1999 the character Augustin (Jean-Chrétien Sibertin-Blanc) re-appeared in Fontaine's film Augustin, King of Kung-Fu. How I Killed My Father was released in 2001, and Nathalie... followed in 2003. The 2005 film, Entre ses mains was widely described as a thriller: an "intimate thriller" according to Fontaine herself. A third Augustin film, Nouvelle chance (also known as Oh La La) was released in 2006. Then came The Girl From Monaco in 2008 and Coco Before Chanel, her biopic of Coco Chanel, in 2009.

Fontaine's work is not easily categorised, though the phrase "psychological drama" is often used. She told a UK newspaper, "I try to work on my characters' blind side, in a kind of Freudian way: to ask, 'What are the things about themselves that they're unaware of?' I'm fascinated by the irony of fate, when something goes into a skid. All my stories have an element of cruelty in them."

While knowing that the movement of "women's cinema" worked as a counter to the classical Hollywood system, Fontaine didn't like to identify with this. During an interview in 1998 with Eve-Laure Moros, she stated: "If people say that 'Nettoyage a sec' is a woman's film, I'm very surprised, I don't know what that means... I think that to be a filmmaker, as far as sexuality, it's something that's really de-sexualizing. That is, you become a bizarre thing, when you're directing a film---during the shooting, you're neither a man nor a woman, you're really something strange and very ambivalent."

== Filmography ==
Film

Year	Title	Director	Writer	Notes	Ref.
1993	Les Histoires d'amour finissent mal... en général	Yes	Yes		
1995	Augustin	Yes	Yes		
1997	L'@mour est à réinventer	Yes	Yes	Segment: Tapin du soir	
1997	Dry Cleaning	Yes	Yes		
1999	Augustin, King of Kung-Fu	Yes	Yes		
2001	How I Killed My Father	Yes	Yes		
2003	Nathalie...	Yes	Yes		
2005	Entre ses mains	Yes	Yes		
2006	Oh La La!	Yes	Yes		
2008	The Girl from Monaco	Yes	Yes		
2009	Coco Before Chanel	Yes	Yes		
2011	My Worst Nightmare	Yes	Yes		
2013	Two Mothers	Yes	Yes		
2014	Gemma Bovery	Yes	Yes		
2016	The Innocents	Yes	Yes		
2017	Reinventing Marvin	Yes	Yes		
2019	White as Snow	Yes	Yes		
2020	Night Shift	Yes	Yes		
2021	Presidents	Yes	Yes		
2024	Boléro	Yes	Yes		

Acting roles

Year	Title	Role	Notes
1980	Les Mystères de Paris	Sarah	TV mini-series
1980	Tendres Cousines	Justine	
1981	Si ma gueule vous plaît...	Isabelle	
1982	Caméra une première	Alba	TV series
1984	Le Mystérieux Docteur Cornélius	Andrée de Maubreuil	TV mini-series
1985	Entre chats et loups	Carole Lambert	TV movie
1985	P.R.O.F.S.	Marite	
1986	Grand hôtel	Marite	TV series
1987	Children and the White Whale	Claudine	TV movie
1988	Carte de presse	Pauline	TV mini-series
1986–1990	Série rose	Mathilde / Mme Orlova	TV series
1999	Pas de scandale	Nathalie	

== Awards and nominations ==
BAFTA Awards

Year	Category	Title	Result
2009	Best Film Not in the English Language	Coco Before Chanel	Nominated

César Awards

Year	Category	Title	Result
1998	Best Original Screenplay or Adaptation	Dry Cleaning	Nominated
2006	Best Adaptation	Entre ses mains	Nominated
2010	Best Adaptation	Coco Before Chanel	Nominated
2017	Best Film	The Innocents	Nominated
2017	Best Director	The Innocents	Nominated
2017	Best Original Screenplay	The Innocents	Nominated

Venice Film Festival

Year	Category	Title	Result
1997	Golden Osella	Dry Cleaning	Won
1997	Golden Lion	Dry Cleaning	Nominated

Lumière Awards

Year	Category	Title	Result
2009	Best Film	Coco Before Chanel	Nominated
2009	Best Director	Coco Before Chanel	Nominated

Other awards

Year	Award	Category	Title	Result
1993	Prix Jean Vigo		Les Histoires d'amour finissent mal... en général	Won
1995	Cannes Film Festival	Un Certain Regard	Augustin	Nominated
2001	Locarno International Film Festival	Golden Leopard	How I Killed My Father	Nominated
2005	San Sebastián Film Festival	Golden Shell	Entre ses mains	Nominated
2009	Critics' Choice Movie Awards	Best Foreign Language Film	Coco Before Chanel	Nominated
2009	European Film Academy	Lux Award	Coco Before Chanel	Nominated
2016	City of Lights, City of Angels	Audience Award	The Innocents	Won
2016	Norwegian International Film Festival	Andreas Award	The Innocents	Won
2016	Provincetown International Film Festival	Audience Award for Best Narrative Feature	The Innocents	Won

== See also ==
- List of female film and television directors
- List of LGBT-related films directed by women
