= Amy and Ella Meek =

English environmental activist duo

Amy Nicole Meek BEM (born 2003) and Ella Jo Meek BEM (born 2005) are English environmental activists. They campaigned to reduce plastic pollution, for which they received a number of accolades.

== Biography ==
The elder and younger daughters of teachers Tim and Kerry, Amy and Ella grew up in Arnold, a suburb of Nottingham. In 2014, their parents took them out of school to go on a road trip around the country, homeschooling them along the way. As of 2020, the girls attended Redhill Academy.

During their home lessons, the sisters learned about the UN Sustainable Development Goals and the effects of plastic pollution on marine life. At the ages of 12 and 10 respectively, Amy and Ella started the Kids Against Plastic (KAP) litter cleanup initiative in early 2016, inspired by Bali's Bye Bye Plastic Bags youth campaign. Amy and Ella also created informative videos on how to cut plastic waste and brought the campaign to Parliament in 2017. KAP was registered as a charity in 2018, expanding its scope to a youth engagement club and the Plastic Clever scheme to reduce single-use plastic in schools, businesses and other establishments. They also launched an app to aid litter pickups. Over 1,300 schools had adopted the scheme by 2021. Amy and Ella gave talks at the 2018 TEDxExeter and the 2019 UN Young Activists Summit in Geneva.

At the start of 2020, DK acquired the rights to publish Amy and Ella's debut picture guidebook titled Be Plastic Clever later in the year. Foreworded by Steve Backshall, the book covers the topics of plastic pollution and youth activism. Be Plastic Clever was a World Book Day non-fiction pick. The sisters reunited with DK and Backshall for the publication of their second book Be Climate Clever in 2022.

Amy and Ella also became Earth.Org (EO) ambassadors. Individually, Ella was a weekend presenter on the Sky Kids programme FYI.

== Accolades ==
In 2018 for Kids Against Plastic, Amy and Ella received a Points of Light Award from then Prime Minister Theresa May. At the 2021 Pride of Britain Awards, Amy and Ella became the inaugural winners of the Environmental Champion category. Amy and Ella were awarded British Empire Medals (BEM) on the 2022 New Year Honours list.

== Bibliography ==
- Be Plastic Clever (2020)
- Be Climate Clever (2022)
