= Jacques-Henri Bronckart =

Belgian film producer

Jacques-Henri Bronckart is a Belgian film producer.

== Biography ==
Bronckart was born in Liège, Belgium. He attended the University of Liège and earned a degree in communication and cinema in 1994. Bronckart's career as a producer began in the mid 1990s as an assistant for Latitude Productions, producing early short films directed by Bouli Lanners and Micha Wald. He then founded the production company Versus in April 1999 with his older brother Olivier. Bronckart was a producer of the film Days of Glory, which was nominated for Best Foreign Language Film at the 79th Academy Awards. Through his production company, he frequently collaborated with Bouli Lanners, Olivier Masset-Depasse, Joachim Lafosse, and Fien Troch.

In 2009, Jacques-Henri and Olivier Bronckart founded the film distribution company O'Brother in Brussels. In 2013, Bronckart received a Magritte Award in the category of Best Flemish Film in Coproduction for his work on Kid (2012). He was also nominated for a Magritte Award for Best Foreign Film in Coproduction for his work on The Nun (2013).

== Selected filmography ==
- The Very Merry Widows (2003)
- In the Battlefields (2004)
- Days of Glory (2006)
- In the Arms of My Enemy (2007)
- Eldorado (2008)
- Private Lessons (2008)
- Black Heaven (2010)
- Illegal (2010)
- The Giants (2011)
- The Invader (2011)
- Our Children (2012)
- Kid (2012)
- The Nun (2013)
- Henri (2013)
- Alleluia (2014)
- Tokyo Fiancée (2014)
- Mon Amie Victoria (2014)
- Une famille à louer (2015)
- I'm Dead but I Have Friends (2015)
- The Lady in the Car with Glasses and a Gun (2015)
- Heat Wave (2015)
- The White Knights (2015)
- The Odyssey (2016)
- The First, the Last (2016)
- Down by Love (2016)
- After Love (2016)
- Trainee Day (2016)
- Home (2016)
- A Woman's Life (2016)
- The Midwife (2017)
- Above the Law (2017)
- 15 minutes de guerre (2018)
- Mothers' Instinct (2018)
- When It Melts (2023)
- Through the Night (2023)
- A Missing Part (2024)
