= 7th Magritte Awards =

2017 Belgian film awards ceremony

- Official poster
- Date: 4 February 2017
- Site: Square; Mont des Arts, Brussels, Belgium
- Hosted by: Anne-Pascale Clairembourg
- Produced by: José Bouquiaux
- Directed by: Vincent J. Gustin

Highlights
- Best Film: The First, the Last
- Most awards: The First, the Last (5)
- Most nominations: The First, the Last and Keeper (8)

Television coverage
- Network: BeTV

The 7th Magritte Awards ceremony, presented by the Académie André Delvaux, honored the best films of 2016 in Belgium and took place on 4 February 2017 at the Square in the historic site of Mont des Arts, Brussels, beginning at 8:00 p.m. CET. During the ceremony, the Académie André Delvaux presented Magritte Awards in 22 categories. The ceremony was televised in Belgium by BeTV. Actress Virginie Efira presided the ceremony, while Anne-Pascale Clairembourg hosted the show for the first time.

The nominees for the 7th Magritte Awards were announced on January 10, 2017. Films with the most nominations were The First, the Last and Keeper with eight, followed by Death by Death and Parasol with seven. The winners were announced during the awards ceremony on February 4, 2017. The First, the Last won five awards, including Best Film and Best Director for Bouli Lanners. Other multiple winners were Keeper with three awards, and Death by Death, Parasol, and The Red Turtle with two.

== Winners and nominees ==
=== Best Film ===
- The First, the Last (Les Premiers, les Derniers)
  - After Love (L'Économie du couple)
  - Death by Death (Je me tue à le dire)
  - Keeper
  - Parasol

=== Best Director ===
- Bouli Lanners – The First, the Last (Les Premiers, les Derniers)
  - Joachim Lafosse – After Love (L'Économie du couple)
  - Valéry Rosier – Parasol
  - Xavier Seron – Death by Death (Je me tue à le dire)

=== Best Actor ===
- Jean-Jacques Rausin – Death by Death (Je me tue à le dire)
  - Aboubakr Bensaihi – Black
  - François Damiens – Les Cowboys
  - Bouli Lanners – The First, the Last (Les Premiers, les Derniers)

=== Best Actress ===
- Virginie Efira – In Bed with Victoria (Victoria)
- Astrid Whettnall – Road to Istanbul (La Route d'Istanbul)
  - Jo Deseure – Man Overboard (Un homme à la mer)
  - Marie Gillain – Mirage of Love (Mirage d'amour)

=== Best Supporting Actor ===
- David Murgia – The First, the Last (Les Premiers, les Derniers)
  - Laurent Capelluto – I Am a Soldier (Je suis un soldat)
  - Charlie Dupont – Odd Job (Un petit boulot)
  - Sam Louwyck – Keeper

=== Best Supporting Actress ===
- Catherine Salée – Keeper
  - Anne Coesens – Jailbirds (La Taularde)
  - Virginie Efira – Elle
  - Julienne Goeffers – Parasol

=== Most Promising Actor ===
- Yoann Blanc – Man Overboard (Un homme à la mer)
  - Lazare Gousseau – Baden Baden
  - Martin Nissen – Welcome Home
  - Pierre Olivier – Nous quatre

=== Most Promising Actress ===
- Salomé Richard – Baden Baden
  - Martha Canga Antonio – Black
  - Ghalia Benali – As I Open My Eyes (À peine j'ouvre les yeux)
  - Jade Soentjens and Margaux Soentjens – After Love (L'Économie du couple)

=== Best Screenplay ===
- Death by Death (Je me tue à le dire) – Xavier Seron
  - After Love (L'Économie du couple) – Joachim Lafosse
  - The First, the Last (Les Premiers, les Derniers) – Bouli Lanners
  - Keeper – Guillaume Senez and David Lambert

=== Best First Feature Film ===
- Keeper
  - Death by Death (Je me tue à le dire)
  - Parasol

=== Best Flemish Film ===
- Belgica
  - Black
  - The Land of the Enlightened
  - Problemski Hotel

=== Best Foreign Film in Coproduction ===
- The Red Turtle (La Tortue rouge)
  - As I Open My Eyes (À peine j'ouvre les yeux)
  - Eternity (Éternité)
  - Les Cowboys

=== Best Cinematography ===
- Parasol – Olivier Boonjing
  - The Dancer (La Danseuse) – Benoît Debie
  - Evolution – Manuel Dacosse
  - The First, the Last (Les Premiers, les Derniers) – Jean-Paul De Zaeytijd

=== Best Production Design ===
- The First, the Last (Les Premiers, les Derniers) – Paul Rouschop
  - Eternity (Éternité) – Véronique Sacrez
  - Keeper – Florin Dima

=== Best Costume Design ===
- The First, the Last (Les Premiers, les Derniers) – Elise Ancion
  - Baden Baden – Sandra Campisi
  - Black – Nina Caspari

=== Best Original Score ===
- Parasol – Cyrille de Haes and Manuel Roland
  - Black – Hannes De Maeyer
  - Rising Voices (Le Chant des hommes) – Catherine Graindorge

=== Best Sound ===
- The Red Turtle (La Tortue rouge) – Nils Fauth and Peter Soldan
  - Death by Death (Je me tue à le dire) – Arnaud Calvar, Julien Mizac, and Philippe Charbonnel
  - Keeper – Virginie Messiaen and Franco Piscopo

=== Best Editing ===
- Keeper – Julie Brenta
  - Death by Death (Je me tue à le dire) – Julie Naas
  - Parasol – Nicolas Rumpl

=== Best Fiction Short Film ===
- The Plumber (Le Plombier)
  - Lovers (Les Amoureuses)
  - Snatched (A l'arraché)

=== Best Animated Short Film ===
- Pornography
  - Summer (Estate)
  - Totems

=== Best Documentary Film ===
- Into Battle (En bataille)
  - Abandoned Land (La Terre abandonnée)
  - Intégration Inch'Allah

=== Honorary Magritte Award ===
- André Dussollier

== Films with multiple nominations and awards ==
The following twelve films received multiple nominations.

- Eight: The First, the Last, Keeper
- Seven: Death by Death, Parasol
- Five: Black
- Four: After Love
- Three: Baden Baden
- Two: As I Open My Eyes, Eternity, Les Cowboys, Man Overboard, The Red Turtle

The following five films received multiple awards.

- Five: The First, the Last
- Three: Keeper
- Two: Death by Death, Parasol and The Red Turtle

== See also ==
- 42nd César Awards
- 22nd Lumières Awards
- 2016 in film
