= Magritte Award for Best Supporting Actress =

Belgian film award

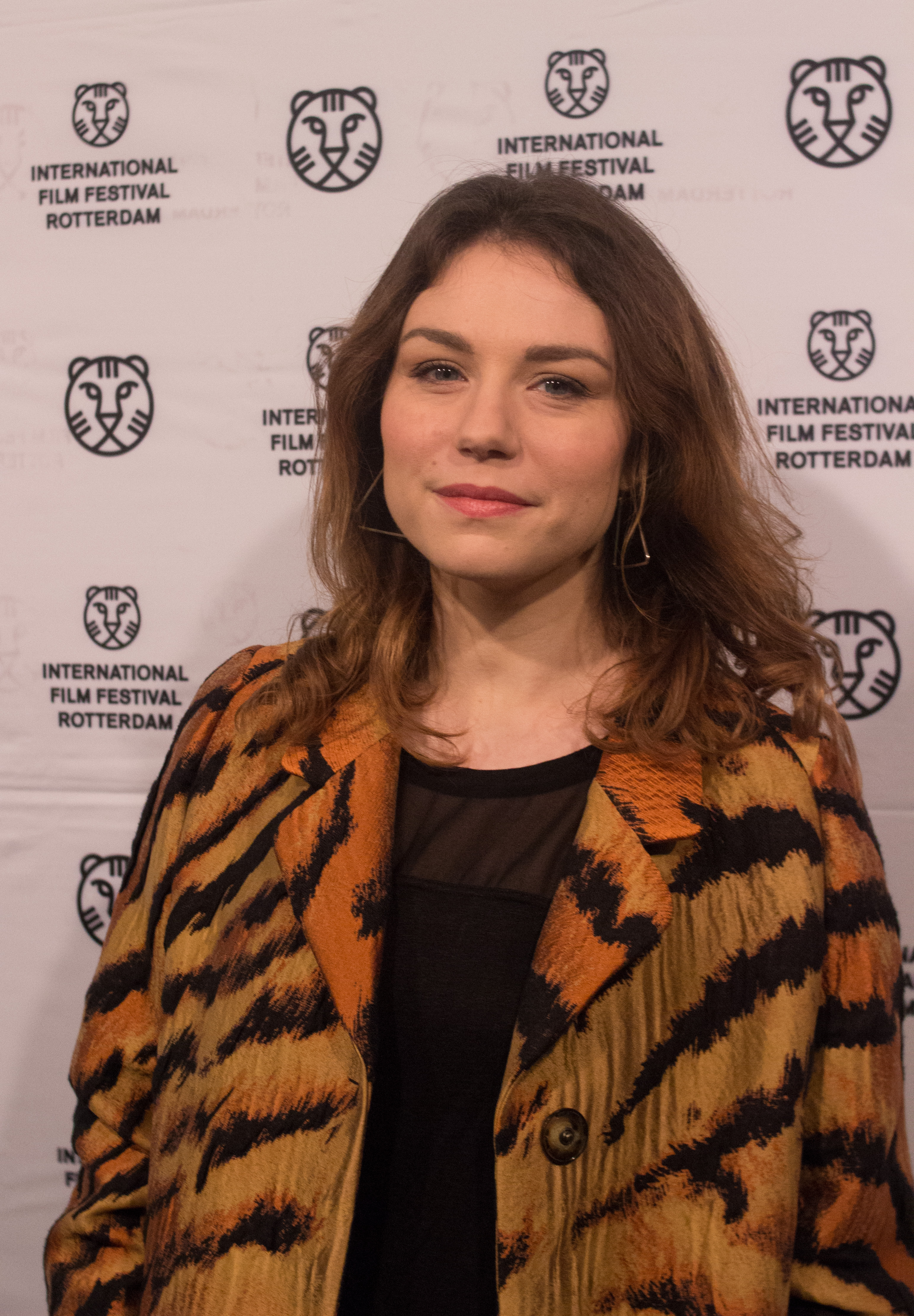
- Émilie Dequenne at the IFFR 2017 promoting the movie "This Is Our Land"
- Presented by: Académie André Delvaux
- First award: 2011
- Currently held by: Salomé Dewaels, Nino (2025)
- Website: lesmagritteducinema.com

The Magritte Award for Best Supporting Actress (French: Magritte de la meilleure actrice dans un second rôle) is an award presented annually by the Académie André Delvaux. It is given in honor of an actress who has delivered an outstanding performance in a supporting role while working within the film industry. It is one of the Magritte Awards, which were established to recognize excellence in Belgian cinematic achievements.

The 1st Magritte Awards ceremony was held in 2011 with Christelle Cornil receiving the award for her role in Illegal. As of the 2026 ceremony, Salomé Dewaels is the most recent winner in this category for her role in Nino.

== Winners and nominees ==
In the list below, winners are listed first in the colored row, followed by the other nominees.

=== Superlatives ===
Superlative	Best Actress		Best Supporting Actress		Overall (including Most Promising Actress)	
Actress with most awards	Émilie Dequenne	3	Catherine Salée	2	Émilie Dequenne	4
Actress with most nominations	Lubna Azabal	6	Yolande Moreau	5	Yolande Moreau	9
Actress with most nominations without ever winning	Cécile de France	5	Claire Bodson	3	Cécile de France	5
Oldest winner	Jo Deseure	74	Yolande Moreau	58	Jo Deseure	74
Oldest nominee	Annie Cordy	86	Julienne Goeffers	75	Annie Cordy	86
Youngest winner	Pauline Étienne	25	Aurora Marion	32	Pauline Étienne	25

=== 2010s ===
Year	Actress	English title	Original title
2010 (1st)	Christelle Cornil	Illegal	Illégal
2010 (1st)	Sandrine Blancke	Sister Smile	Soeur Sourire
2010 (1st)	Claire Bodson	Private Lessons	Élève libre
2010 (1st)	Yolande Moreau	Gainsbourg: A Heroic Life	Gainsbourg, vie héroïque
2011 (2nd)	Gwen Berrou	The Giants	Les Géants
2011 (2nd)	Virginie Efira	Kill Me Please	
2011 (2nd)	Tania Garbarski	A Distant Neighborhood	Quartier lointain
2011 (2nd)	Marie Kremer	Final Balance	Légitime Défense
2012 (3rd)	Yolande Moreau	Camille Rewinds	Camille redouble
2012 (3rd)	Stéphane Bissot	Our Children	À perdre la raison
2012 (3rd)	Natacha Régnier	One Night	38 témoins
2012 (3rd)	Catherine Salée	Mobile Home	
2013 (4th)	Catherine Salée	Blue Is the Warmest Colour	La Vie d'Adèle – Chapitres 1 & 2
2013 (4th)	Dominique Baeyens	In the Name of the Son	Au nom du fils
2013 (4th)	Christelle Cornil	Landes	
2013 (4th)	Nicole Shirer	BXL/USA	
2014 (5th)	Lubna Azabal	The Marchers	La Marche
2014 (5th)	Anne Coesens	Not My Type	Pas son genre
2014 (5th)	Christelle Cornil	Two Days, One Night	Deux jours, une nuit
2014 (5th)	Catherine Salée	Two Days, One Night	Deux jours, une nuit
2015 (6th)	Anne Coesens	All Cats Are Grey	Tous les chats sont gris
2015 (6th)	Yolande Moreau	The Brand New Testament	Le Tout Nouveau Testament
2015 (6th)	Helena Noguerra	Alleluia	
2015 (6th)	Babetida Sadjo	Waste Land	
2016 (7th)	Catherine Salée	Keeper	
2016 (7th)	Anne Coesens	Jailbirds	La Taularde
2016 (7th)	Virginie Efira	Elle	
2016 (7th)	Julienne Goeffers	Parasol	
2017 (8th)	Aurora Marion	A Wedding	Noces
2017 (8th)	Isabelle de Hertogh	150 Milligrams	La Fille de Brest
2017 (8th)	Lucie Debay	The Confession	La Confession
2017 (8th)	Yolande Moreau	A Woman's Life	Une vie
2018 (9th)	Lucie Debay	Our Struggles	Nos batailles
2018 (9th)	Tania Garbarski	Bye Bye Germany	Es war einmal in Deutschland...
2018 (9th)	Salomé Richard	The Faithful Son	La Part sauvage
2018 (9th)	Erika Sainte	The Benefit of the Doubt	Une Part d'ombre
2019 (10th)	Myriem Akheddiou	Young Ahmed	Le Jeune Ahmed
2019 (10th)	Claire Bodson	Young Ahmed	Le Jeune Ahmed
2019 (10th)	Stéphanie Crayencour	Emma Peeters	
2019 (10th)	Yolande Moreau	Cleo	

=== 2020s ===
Year	Actress	English title	Original title
2020/21 (11th)	Laura Verlinden	Playground	Un monde
2020/21 (11th)	Myriem Akheddiou	Titane	
2020/21 (11th)	Claire Bodson	Mother Schmuckers	Fils de plouc
2020/21 (11th)	Émilie Dequenne	Love Affair(s)	Les choses qu'on dit, les choses qu'on fait
2022 (12th)	Émilie Dequenne	Close	
2022 (12th)	Veerle Baetens	Singing Jailbirds	À l'ombre des filles
2022 (12th)	Anne Coesens	By Your Side	À la folie
2022 (12th)	Mara Taquin	Zero Fucks Given	Rien à foutre
2023 (13th)	Sandrine Blancke	Love According to Dalva	Dalva
2023 (13th)	Yves-Marina Gnahoua	Omen	Augure
2023 (13th)	Myriem Akheddiou	Sixteen	16 Ans
2023 (13th)	Lucie Debay	Omen	Augure
2024 (14th)	Louise Manteau	It's Raining in the House	Il pleut dans la maison
2024 (14th)	Claire Bodson	Julie Keeps Quiet	Julie zwijgt
2024 (14th)	Lucie Debay	Clenched Fist	
2024 (14th)	Catherine Salée	Amal	
2025 (15th)	Salomé Dewaels	Nino	
2025 (15th)	Natali Broods	We Believe You	On vous croit
2025 (15th)	Christelle Cornil	Young Mothers	Jeunes mères
2025 (15th)	Babetida Sadjo	Muganga	
2025 (15th)	Anaël Snoek	Kika	
