= Emma de Caunes =

French actress (born 1976)

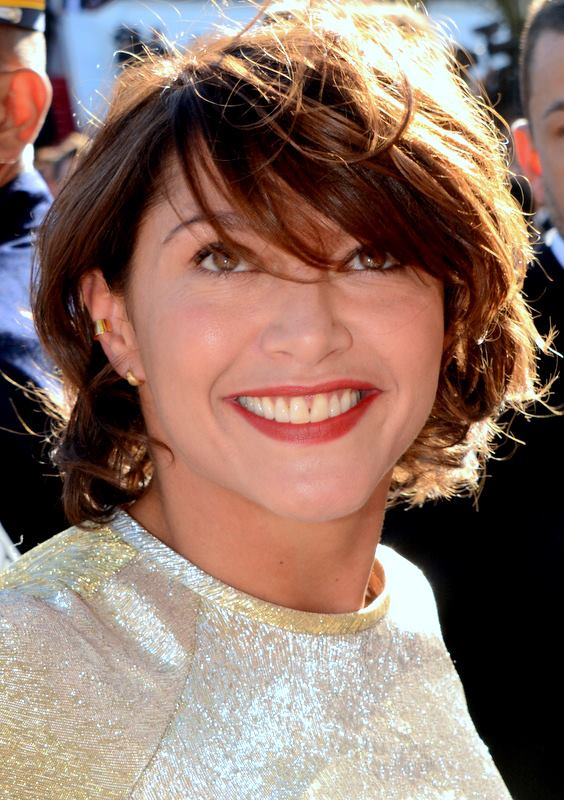
- De Caunes at the 2015 Cannes Film Festival
- Born: 9 September 1976 (age 50); Paris, France
- Occupation: Actress
- Years active: 1986–present
- Spouses: Sinclair (m. 2001; div. 2005) Jamie Hewlett (m. 2011)
- Children: 1
- Parent(s): Antoine de Caunes; Gaëlle Royer
- Relatives: Georges de Caunes (grandfather); Jacqueline Joubert (grandmother)

Emma de Caunes (French: [ɛma də kon]; born 9 September 1976) is a French actress.

== Life and career ==
De Caunes was born in Paris on 9 September 1976, the daughter of actor and director Antoine de Caunes and director and graphic designer Gaëlle Royer. Her paternal grandparents are journalist Georges de Caunes and Jacqueline Joubert, one of the first continuity announcers on French television.

=== Marriage and family ===
De Caunes married the singer known as Sinclair in 2001. They have a daughter Nina together, born in October 2002. They divorced in 2005.

In September 2011, De Caunes married Jamie Hewlett, an English comic book artist.

=== Education and career ===
De Caunes began acting in 1988 at the age of 12 with a role in Margot et le voleur d'enfants, a short film by director Michèle Reiser, her godmother. She obtained her French baccalauréat in film in 1995 after high school.

De Caunes appeared in various commercials before her first major film role in 1997 in Sylvie Verheyde's Un frère. She won the Most Promising Actress award for this performance at the 1998 César awards. In 2001 she starred with Radiohead’s Thom Yorke in the music video for the song “Knives Out,” directed by Michel Gondry. She won the 2002 Prix Romy Schneider, an award given annually to a promising young actress.

She had a main role in the 2007 comedy film Mr. Bean's Holiday, in which she played an actress in an independent film being made by Willem Dafoe's character.

=== Allegations against Weinstein ===
In 2017, De Caunes publicly accused Hollywood producer Harvey Weinstein of sexual misconduct at the 2010 Cannes Film Festival. She alleges that Weinstein lured her to his hotel room, and chased her around the room while he was naked in an attempt to have sex. Her allegations were first reported in The New Yorker.

== Theatre ==
Year	Title	Author	Director	Notes
2001–03	La Nuit du thermomètre	Diastème	Diastème	Nominated - Molière Award for Best Female Newcomer
2009	L’Amour de l'art	Diastème	Diastème (2)	
2011	Pour l'amour de Gérard Philipe	Pierre Notte	Pierre Notte	
2012	Simpatico	Sam Shepard	Didier Long	
2016	The River	Jez Butterworth	Jérémie Lippmann	

== Filmography ==
=== Actress ===
Year	Title	Role	Director	Notes
1988	Margot et le voleur d'enfants	Margot	Michèle Reiser	Short
1996	L'échappée belle	Juliette	Étienne Dhaene	
1996	Vladimir de trop	Lola	Jacques-Henri Rochereuil	Short
1996	Velvet 99	Milli Vanilli	Agnès Deygas & Thierry Kuntzel	Short
1997	Un frère...	Sophie	Sylvie Verheyde	César Award for Most Promising Actress; Paris Film Festival - Best Actress; Nominated - Acteurs à l'Écran - Best Actress
1997	Au bord de l'autoroute	Camille	Olivier Jahan	Short
1997	Si c'est bon comme ça	The girl		Music video
1998	Restons groupés	Claire	Jean-Paul Salomé	
1998	La voie est libre	Nadia	Stéphane Clavier	
1998	3 petits points la lune	The girl	Olias Barco	Short
1998	Beaucoup trop loin		Olivier Jahan (2)	Short
1999	Mille bornes	Nina	Alain Beigel	
2000	Sans plomb	Marie	Muriel Téodori	
2000	Mondialito	Louisa	Nicolas Wadimoff	
2000	Princesses	Sophie	Sylvie Verheyde (2)	
2000	Faites comme si je n'étais pas là	Marie	Olivier Jahan (3)	
2001	Knives Out	The girl	Michel Gondry	Music video
2002	Asterix & Obelix: Mission Cleopatra	Caesar's secretary	Alain Chabat	
2002	Les amants du Nil	Anne Frendo	Eric Heumann	
2003	Beyond Good & Evil	Jade	Michel Ancel	Video Games
2004	Ma Mère	Hansi	Christophe Honoré	
2005	Short Order	Fiona	Anthony Byrne	
2005	Kaamelott	Azénor	Alexandre Astier & François Guérin	TV series (2 episodes)
2006	The Science of Sleep	Zoé	Michel Gondry (2)	
2006	Flushed Away	Rita Malone	David Bowers & Sam Fell	French dub
2007	The Diving Bell and the Butterfly	Empress Eugenie	Julian Schnabel	
2007	Mr. Bean's Holiday	Sabine	Steve Bendelack	
2007	Days of Darkness	Karine Tendance	Denys Arcand	
2008	Coluche: l'histoire d'un mec	The nurse	Antoine de Caunes	
2008	Le bruit des gens autour	Maud	Diastème	
2008	Rien dans les poches	Marie Manikowski	Marion Vernoux	TV movie Nominated - International Emmy Award for Best Actress
2009	Sweet Dream	Adèle	Jean-Philippe Amar	TV series (1 episode)
2011	Faux coupable	Lena Hemont	Didier Le Pêcheur	TV movie
2012	Le Sourire	The girl		Music video
2013	The Dune	Fabienne	Yossi Aviram	
2013	Lanester	Gabrielle Stahl	Franck Mancuso	TV movie
2013	Myster Mocky présente		Jean-Pierre Mocky	TV series (1 episode)
2015	Les Châteaux de sable	Eléonore	Olivier Jahan (4)	
2015	La Traque	Stacy	Théodore Bonnet	Short
2015	Lanester: Memento Mori	Gabrielle Stahl	Franck Mancuso (2)	TV movie
2016	The Idyll	Woman	Justin Anderson	Short
2016	Super Triste	Cecile Kraft	Stéphanie Kalfon	Short
2016	Lanester : Les Enfants de la dernière pluie	Gabrielle Stahl	Jean-Marc Brondolo	TV movie
2017–2019	Ransom	Nathalie Denard		TV series (Recurring Role)
2022	Le monde d'hier	Lucie		

=== Director / Writer ===
Year	Title	Notes
2000	Le nombril de l'univers	Short
