= Claire Bodson =

Belgian actress

- Born: Brussels, Belgium
- Education: Royal Conservatory of Brussels
- Occupations: Stage actress; film actress
- Years active: 1996–present

Claire Bodson is a Belgian stage and film actress. She studied at the Royal Conservatory of Brussels and began working in theatre after developing an interest in acting. After some stage experiences at the Théâtre de l'Ancre in Charleroi, Bodson became a regular performer at the Théâtre National Wallonie-Bruxelles, starting in 1997.

She made her film debut in Private Lessons (2008), a drama film directed by Joachim Lafosse that earned her a Magritte Award nomination in the category of Best Supporting Actress. She returned to film acting in 2014 with Our Children, which marked her second collaboration with Lafosse.

Bodson then appeared in Jean-Pierre and Luc Dardenne's film Young Ahmed (2019). At the 10th Magritte Awards, it received nine nominations, including Best Supporting Actress for Bodson. She is known to be selective about her film roles.

== Filmography ==
Year	Title	Role	Notes
2008	Private Lessons	Nathalie	Nominated—Magritte Award for Best Supporting Actress
2012	Our Children	Officer	
2012	La Part sauvage	Claire	Short film
2019	Young Ahmed	Mother	Nominated—Magritte Award for Best Supporting Actress
2021	Mother Schmuckers	Cachemire	Nominated—Magritte Award for Best Supporting Actress
2024	Julie Keeps Quiet	Sofie	Nominated—Magritte Award for Best Supporting Actress
2024	Night Call	Gina	
