= David Lambert =

David Lambert may refer to:

- Dave Lambert (American jazz vocalist) (1917–1966), American jazz lyricist and singer
- Dave Lambert (English musician) (born 1949), songwriter, guitarist and singer
- David Lambert (footballer) (1939–2016), Welsh footballer who played for Cardiff City and Wrexham
- David Lambert (actor) (born 1993), American actor
- David Lambert (trade unionist, born 1933) (1933–2023), British and international clothing trades union leader
- David Lambert (trade unionist, born 1922) (1922–1967), Scottish novelist and trade union leader
- David L. Lambert, English astronomer
- David Lambert (director) (born 1974), Belgian film director and screenwriter
- David Lambert, former news director at TVShowsOnDVD.com

== See also ==
- Lambert (name)
- David Lambert House, a historic house in Connecticut built by David Lambert in the 1700s
