= Hichame Alaouié =

Belgian cinematographer

- Citizenship: Belgium
- Occupation: Cinematographer
- Awards: Magritte Award for Best Cinematography

Hichame Alaouié is a Belgian cinematographer. His credits include Private Lessons (2008), Horses of God (2012), and Tokyo Fiancée (2014). He received the Magritte Award for Best Cinematography in two consecutive years for his work in Last Winter and Horses of God.

== Filmography ==
Year	Title	Role	Director	Notes
1997	Eau	Camera operator	Dominique Standaert	Short
1999	Une liaison pornographique	Second assistant camera	Frédéric Fonteyne	
2001	Sofor	Cinematographer	Guldem Durmaz	Short
2001	Nana	First assistant camera	Édouard Molinaro	TV movie
2002	Step by Step	First assistant camera	Philippe Blasband	
2002	Verrouillage central	Assistant camera	Geneviève Mersch	Short
2003	Les mains froides	Cinematographer	John Shank	Short
2003	Papa maman s'ront jamais grands	Assistant camera	Jean-Louis Bertucelli	TV movie
2003	Nous/Autres	Cinematographer	Giovanni Cioni	Documentary
2005	L'Enfant	First assistant camera	Dardenne brothers	
2005	Une lumière la nuit	Cinematographer	Nadia Benzekri	Documentary
2006	Private Property	Cinematographer	Joachim Lafosse	
2006	Les deux vies du serpent	Cinematographer	Hélier Cisterne	Short
2006	Noctis Bxl	Cinematographer	Rodrigo Litorriaga	Short
2007	Missing	Cinematographer	Matthieu Donck	Short
2007	Boulevard l'océan	Cinematographer	Céline Novel	Short
2007	Abandon	Cinematographer	John Shank	Short
2007	Why We Can't See Each Other Outside When the Sun is Shining	Cinematographer	Bernard Bellefroid	Documentary
2008	Eldorado	Assistant camera	Bouli Lanners	
2008	Private Lessons	Cinematographer	Joachim Lafosse	
2008	Bonne nuit	Cinematographer	Valéry Rosier	Short
2009	La régate	Camera operator	Bernard Bellefroid	
2009	Vivre encore un peu...	Director of photography & Camera operator	David Lambert	Short
2009	Stolen Art	Cinematographer	Simon Backès	Documentary
2010	Des filles en noir	Cinematographer	Jean-Paul Civeyrac	
2010	Ish lelo selolari	Cinematographer	Sameh Zoabi	
2010	La fabrique de panique	Camera operator	Kita Bauchet	Documentary
2011	Au cul du loup	Cinematographer	Pierre Duculot	
2011	L'hiver dernier	Cinematographer	John Shank (3)	Magritte Award for Best Cinematography
2012	Horses of God	Cinematographer	Nabil Ayouch	Magritte Award for Best Cinematography
2014	Tokyo Fiancée	Cinematographer	Stefan Liberski	Nominated - Magritte Award for Best Cinematography
2015 - present	The Bureau	Cinematographer	Hélier Cisterne & Éric Rochant	TV series (4 episodes)
2017	Don't Tell Her	Cinematographer	Solange Cicurel	
2018	Mothers' Instinct	Cinematographer	Olivier Masset-Depasse	Magritte Award for Best Cinematography
2023	Class Act	Cinematographer	Tristan Séguéla	TV mini-series
2024	The Good Teacher	Cinematographer	Teddy Lussi-Modeste	
2024	The Art of Nothing	Cinematographer	Stefan Liberski	
2025	The Richest Woman in the World	Cinematographer	Thierry Klifa	
