= Jonas Bloquet =

Belgian actor and film director (born 1992)

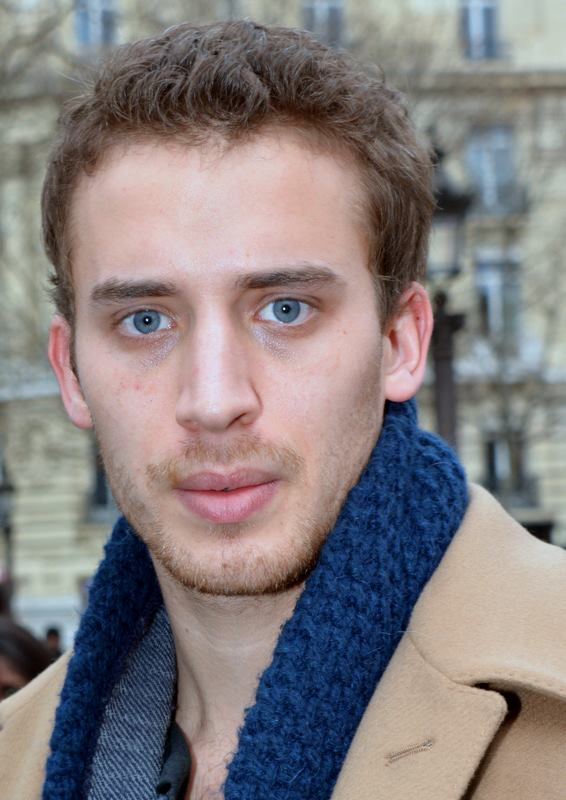
- Bloquet in 2017
- Born: Jonas Jean Bloquet; 10 July 1992 (age 34); Brussels, Belgium
- Education: Eva Saint-Paul; Ecole de la Cité
- Occupations: Actor; film director
- Years active: 2008–present
- Partner: Claire Boyé (2015–present)
- Children: 1

Jonas Jean Bloquet (born 10 July 1992) is a Belgian actor and film director. He made his film debut at the age of 15 in the drama Private Lessons (2008), which earned him a Magritte Award nomination for Most Promising Actor. He has starred in Belgian, French, and American films and is known for his roles such as Vincent Leblanc in the psychological thriller Elle (2016), for which he was nominated for a César Award for Most Promising Actor, and Maurice "Frenchie" Theriault in the horror film The Nun (2018) and its sequel The Nun II (2023). In 2025, he won the Magritte Award for Best Supporting Actor for Night Call (2024). On television, he has starred in the mystery-science fiction series 1899 (2022), and portrayed Joseph II, Holy Roman Emperor in the historical drama series Marie Antoinette (2023).

== Early life and education ==
Bloquet was born in Brussels, Belgium on 10 July 1992. His father was a tennis teacher and his mother was a civil servant at the European Commission. He has a brother.

Bloquet started playing tennis as a child, having his father as his teacher. He wanted to be an engineer until his mother encouraged him to audition for the film Private Lessons after seeing an ad looking for a teenager who knew how to play tennis. Coincidentally, Bloquet's father had been a tennis teacher for the director, Joachim Lafosse, years before. His mother died of cancer eight months after the film's release.

Bloquet speaks French, Dutch and English.

He moved to Paris in 2010, where he studied acting at the Eva Saint-Paul Theatre School for three years. He then studied filmmaking at Luc Besson's Ecole de la Cité.

== Career ==
In 2008, Bloquet made his film debut at the age of 15 as a young tennis player in the Belgian drama Private Lessons, directed by Joachim Lafosse, which earned him a Magritte Award nomination for Most Promising Actor.

In 2013, he had a small role in Luc Besson's black comedy film The Family, his first English-language film, and appeared in Guillaume Brac's drama Tonnerre. In 2014, he appeared in McG's action thriller 3 Days to Kill.

Between 2015 and 2016, Bloquet directed four short films; Conte sur moi, Max, Je suis un troc, and Le Comble du bourreau.

In 2016, he played Vincent Leblanc, the son of Isabelle Huppert's character in the French-German psychological thriller Elle, directed by Paul Verhoeven, for which Bloquet was nominated for a César Award for Most Promising Actor. That same year, he also had a role in Arnaud des Pallières's drama Orphan. In 2017, he played K-Tron Warrior in Luc Besson's space opera film Valerian and the City of a Thousand Planets.

In 2018, Bloquet played French-Canadian farmer Maurice "Frenchie" Theriault in the American horror film The Nun by Corin Hardy, a role he reprised in the sequel, The Nun II, directed by Michael Chaves and released in 2023.

In 2021, he portrayed French military officer Jules Brunet in the Japanese film Baragaki: Unbroken Samurai, directed by Masato Harada.

In 2022, he played Lieutenant Chambreau in the French-Senegalese war drama Father & Soldier, directed by Mathieu Vadepied, which premiered at the 2022 Cannes Film Festival. He also starred in the Netflix mystery-science fiction series 1899. In 2023, he portrayed Joseph II, Holy Roman Emperor in the French historical drama television series Marie Antoinette, broadcast by Canal+.

In 2024, he starred in Michiel Blanchart's feature debut, the action thriller Night Call, for which he won the 2025 Magritte Award for Best Supporting Actor.

His upcoming projects include David Hourrègue's aquatic science-fiction series Rivages.

== Personal life ==
Since 2015, Bloquet has been in a relationship with actress Claire Boyé, with whom he co-directed and co-starred in the 2015 short film Conte sur moi. The couple's first child, a son, was born in July 2023. They live in Paris.

== Filmography ==
Key
†	Denotes films that have not yet been released

=== Film ===
==== As actor ====
Year	Title	Role	Director	Notes
2008	Private Lessons	Jonas	Joachim Lafosse	
2009	Noctambules	Thomas	Mathieu Tuffreau	Short
2010	Elena	Adrien	Yannick Muller	Short
2012	Trois coeurs pour battre	Nicolas	Arthur Valverde	Short
2013	The Family	André	Luc Besson	
2013	Longue distance	Kévin	Valérie Boucher	Short
2013	Tonnerre	Ivan	Guillaume Brac	
2014	3 Days to Kill	Hugh	McG	
2014	Mauvaise tête	Paul	Camille Vidal-Naquet	Short
2015	Conte sur moi	Lucas	Jonas Bloquet	Short
2015	Max	Max	Jonas Bloquet	Short
2016	Elle	Vincent Leblanc	Paul Verhoeven	
2016	Orphan	Patrick	Arnaud des Pallières	
2017	Des revolvers dans les yeux		Pierre Comas	Short
2017	Valerian and the City of a Thousand Planets	K-Tron Warrior / Control Room Soldier	Luc Besson	
2018	The Nun	Maurice "Frenchie" Theriault	Corin Hardy	
2018	Alone at My Wedding	Jean-Loup	Marta Bergman	
2018	By Blood (Par le sang)	Hargrold	Jonathan Delerue & Guillaume Enard	Short
2019	Les fauves	Vincent	Vincent Mariette	
2019	La paix intérieure		Cloé Bailly	Short
2020	Working Girls	Jean-Fi	Frédéric Fonteyne & Anne Paulicevich	
2020	One and Thousand Nights	Victor	Élie Girard	Short
2021	Dans les parages	Jonas	Paul Lefevre	Short
2021	Baragaki: Unbroken Samurai	Jules Brunet	Masato Harada	Japanese film
2022	Father & Soldier	Lieutenant Chambreau	Mathieu Vadepied	
2023	The Nun II	Maurice "Frenchie" Theriault	Michael Chaves	
2024	Night Call	Theo	Michiel Blanchart	

==== As director ====
Year	Title	Notes
2015	Conte sur moi	Short
2015	Max	Short
2015	Le Comble du bourreau	Short
2016	Je suis un troc	Short

=== Television ===
Year	Title	Role	Notes
2013	R.I.S, police scientifique	Alexandre Bouvier	TV series (1 episode)
2013	Enquêtes réservées	Jérémy Karevski	TV series (1 episode)
2016	Commissaire Magellan	Stanislas Perrot	TV series (1 episode)
2017	Transferts	Bao	TV series (1 episode)
2018	eLegal	Etienne Lombard	TV series (1 episode)
2021	Germinal	Chaval	TV series (6 episodes)
2022	1899	Lucien	TV series; Main role
2023	Marie Antoinette	Joseph II	TV series (5 episodes)
2025	Rivages	Maréchal Vital Prigent	TV series (2 episodes)

== Theater ==
Year	Title	Author	Director	Ref.
2012	Popcorn	Ben Elton	Claire Boyé	
2013	L'Atelier	Jean-Claude Grumberg	Dalia Bonnet & Coralie Paquelier	
2016	Child's Play	Robert Marasco	Dorothée Deblaton	
—N/a	Quai Ouest	Bernard-Marie Koltès	Jules Rouklos	
—N/a	Angels in America	Tony Kushner		

== Awards and nominations ==
Year	Association	Category	Work	Result	Ref.
2011	Magritte Awards	Most Promising Actor	Private Lessons	Nominated	
2016	Entr'2 Marches International Film Festival	Best Screenplay	Max	Won	
2017	César Awards	Most Promising Actor	Elle	Nominated	
2018	Queen Palm International Film Festival	Silver Award - Best Supporting Actor in a Short Film	By Blood	Won	
2018	South Film and Arts Academy Festival	Best Supporting Actor in a Short Film - Honorable Mention	By Blood	Won	
2025	Magritte Awards	Best Supporting Actor	Night Call	Won	
