= Geneviève Lhermitte =

Belgian murderer (1966–2023)

- Born: 16 November 1966; Brussels, Belgium
- Died: 28 February 2023 (aged 56); Montigny-le-Tilleul, Belgium
- Spouse: Bouchaib Moqadem
- Children: Four daughters, one son
- Parents: Michel Lhermitte; Marina Schoevaert
- Status: Euthanised
- Motive: Mental illness
- Conviction: Murder
- Penalty: Life in prison

Geneviève Lhermitte (16 November 1966 – 28 February 2023) was a Belgian woman who killed all five of her children on 28 February 2007. She did so by slitting their throats with a kitchen knife stolen from a local grocery store while her husband was visiting family in Morocco. Afterward, she then tried to kill herself. She survived the suicide attempt, and was taken into custody and charged with first-degree murder. She was subsequently sentenced to life imprisonment, and in 2023 she was voluntarily euthanized.

Lhermitte had regularly seen a psychiatrist and was reported to be seriously mentally ill. She claimed that she was driven to kill her children due to troubles at home (namely, living with an outsider who financially supported the family).

== Personal life ==
Lhermitte was born on 16 November 1966, in Brussels, to Michel Lhermitte, a businessman and student, and Marina Schoevaert, a nurse. She had two younger sisters: Catherine born in 1969, and Mireille born in 1972. Though she struggled with her coursework and self-confidence during her secondary studies, she graduated in 1991 with a diploma in French and History from the Educational Institute of Social Promotion of the French Community (IEPSCF) in Uccle. It was during the 1988–1989 year at IEPSCF that she met her future husband, Bouchaib Moqadem, who was studying mathematics and physics but did not complete his studies.

Lhermitte and Moqadem married on 22 September 1990 and moved into the apartment of physician Michel Schaar, with whom Moqadem was residing. Schaar had befriended Moqadem's family in Morocco in the 1980s and served as his host in Belgium, and Moqadem considered Schaar as an adoptive father. While Moqadem worked at a convenience store, it was Schaar that was the primary financial provider. Lhermitte did not object to living with him in his apartment as she thought it would be on a temporary basis.

In 1991, Lhermitte was hired as a teacher. Shortly after beginning her new career, she gave birth to her first child, Yasmine (b. 13 August 1992). Three years later, she had her second one, Nora (b. 13 February 1995). From 1 June 1995 to 31 August 1996 she was granted leave from her teaching position due to postpartum depression. After the birth of Yasmine, Schaar purchased a house for himself and his family to live in, and dedicated his apartment to his practice. In 1996, he hired Moqadem to serve as his filing assistant part-time, then full-time in 1998. During this period, he still covered most expenses, including vacations, house repairs, monthly allowances, and life insurance for each family member. Lhermitte gave birth to two more daughters, Myriam (b. 20 April 1997) and Mina (20 May 1999), before the family's move from Brussels to the provincial town of Nivelles. Schaar paid the mortgage and lived on the second floor.

Tensions began rising between Lhermitte and Moqadem. He would spend long hours away from home, becoming a regular at a bar and a spa. In addition, he would take several trips each year to visit his family in Marrakesh, with the length of each trip ranging from a week to a month. Lhermitte's first son and fifth child, Mehdi, was born on 9 August 2003. The following year, Schaar recommended that she should see a psychiatrist and she began consulting one named Diderick Veldekens in 2005.

== Crime ==
On 28 February 2007 Moqadem was expected to return from a trip to Morocco to visit his family. Lhermitte took Yasmine to a dermatology appointment. After picking up the rest of her children at school and preparing lunch for them, she heard a voice tell her, "the machine is running." She mailed two letters: one with jewelry for her sisters, and the other to her friend, Valerie. In it, she called Schaar "a rotten bastard" who "stole" the intimacy between herself, Moqadem, and their children. She also accused Moqadem of being "deaf" and "blind" to her concerns regarding Schaar. After mailing the letters, she went to a grocery store and slipped two kitchen knives into her shopping bag.

Lhermitte told investigators that, when she returned, she hid the knives in a drawer and called over Mina while the other children were watching Spy Kids 3. Lhermitte tried to strangle her, but when she struggled Lhermitte resorted to slashing her throat with one of the knives, all while speaking comforting words and apologizing to her. Mehdi was the next to be killed. When her attempts to strangle him again failed, Lhermitte cut his throat and washed the knife in the bathroom sink afterward.

According to her account, Lhermitte then told Myriam that she had a surprise for her in the office. When she entered, Lhermitte told her to sit on a chair and wear a blue handkerchief over her eyes. Once she was seated, Lhermitte took a marble plaque she found nearby, smashed it over her head, and then cut her throat. Nora, who was allegedly Schaar's favorite goddaughter, was asked to sit in a chair while Lhermitte slit her throat from behind. After she had been killed, Lhermitte wrote the letters "JUD" on the bathroom mirror in her blood, and later stated that she had intended to spell the name "Judas".

Lhermitte's last victim was Yasmine. She called her over and told her she had a surprise for her, just like she had done with Myriam. Lhermitte attacked her from behind as she entered the office, but she was able to dodge the knife by diving to the ground. After a struggle in which she suffered multiple stab wounds, Lhermitte stabbed her in the back and slashed her throat. With her children dead, Lhermitte then attempted to kill herself by falling on her knife. When she realized that the wound would not be fatal, she wrote "call the police" in red marker on her door and called emergency services to the house. Investigators found the five children tucked in their beds, some with stuffed toys in their arms.

== Trial ==
The trial began on 8 December 2008 and lasted about two weeks, ending on 19 December 2008, in the Assize Court of Brabant-Wallon in Nivelles. Geneviève Lhermitte's lawyers were Daniel Spreutels and Xavier Magnee. The jury consisted of eight women and four men. Geneviève Lhermitte confessed to the murder of her children, so the trial focused on what drove Lhermitte to commit the crime. Prosecutor Pierre Rans began opening statements with a description of the scene that met emergency services on 28 February 2007 at the former teacher's home in Nivelles. The prosecutor asked for 30 years in prison.

The trial ended with Lhermitte receiving the maximum sentence for the murder of her five children. The court and the jury did not take any extenuating circumstances into account. In her closing argument, Lhermitte said she would accept any punishment the court gave her and showed remorse for her actions. Earlier in the trial, psychiatrists had found that Lhermitte was not of sound mind when she committed the acts and should not be held accountable for her actions. They felt that she should be admitted into a psychiatric prison rather than going to a regular prison, but the jury did not follow their opinions. Lhermitte had been battling with psychiatric drug injury for many years. She concluded that she saw the murder of her children and committing suicide as her only way out.

== Aftermath ==
=== Trial billing ===
Lhermitte filed for and received a judgment of divorce before her trial; Moqadem at first appealed the decision but later withdrew his objection. Following the trial, Lhermitte was not able to pay for the trial costs, so under Belgian law it fell to her now ex-husband to pick up the bill. This conformed to the Law of Belgium, with the state seeking funds due to have been shared from the sale of their house under their divorce agreement. The overall court expenses and fines were 72,743 euros (about $93,000). Moqadem said he was “disgusted and revolted” by the injustice of this billing system. Moqadem's attorney attempted to have the bill written off, calling for “administrative requirements to be balanced by decency” given the nature of the tragedy.

In February 2010, Moqadem married Asmae Beldi, a professor of Islamic law at the Faculty of Islamic Sciences in Brussels. A daughter was born to the couple about a year later. In June 2013, it was reported that Moqadem had lost 30,000 euros in an investment scam and that he was being harassed by Lhermitte's former attorney for further fees.

=== Post-trial lawsuit ===
After being sentenced to life imprisonment, Lhermitte filed a lawsuit seeking €3m in damages against her psychiatrist, Diderik Veldekens. She said that had her psychiatrist rushed to see her while she was in her disturbed state, the crime would not have been committed. Lhermitte wanted to "secure recognition of the prejudice genuinely suffered" due to the psychiatrist's alleged inaction. During the trial, Veldekens reported meeting with Lhermitte after a first alarming letter, but could not meet with her on 13 February 2007 due to his full schedule. In December 2011, the case was dismissed against Veldekens. The court ruled that the criminal charges against the psychiatrist were "irrelevant".

=== Hospitalization and death ===
In 2019, Lhermitte was transferred to a psychiatric prison. On 28 February 2023, Lhermitte was euthanised on the 16th anniversary of the murders. She was 56.

== In popular culture ==
Belgian director and screenwriter Joachim Lafosse released Our Children, a film based on the story, to positive reviews in 2012. One reviewer called the film a "gloomy and penetrating psychological drama" that portrays the claustrophobia of a protagonist who lives in an environment in which "the walls are constantly closing in around her." Our Children also attained a 93% rating on the aggregation website Rotten Tomatoes. Émilie Dequenne, a French-speaking Belgian actress, played the character based on Geneviève Lhermitte. Dequenne won the Un Certain Regard Award at the Cannes Film Festival and "Best Actress" at the Saint Petersburg International Film Festival for her role.

In December 2010, Moqadem and Schaar filed a lawsuit against Lafosse demanding that they be able to review the film's screenplay. The 4th Civil Chamber of the Court of Brussels ruled that the lawsuit was "admissible but unfounded." However, production had already begun – cast negotiations were finished, and the team had already approached the French government about receiving subsidies – and Lafosse demonstrated no intent to hand over his work. The pair's lawyer subsequently released an official statement: "Moqadem and Schaar feel that this is a violation of their privacy and do not understand why the filmmakers have so little respect for them."
