= Thomas Coumans =

Belgian actor (born 1984)

- Born: 16 September 1984 (age 42); Belgium
- Education: INSAS
- Occupation: Actor
- Years active: 2006–present

Thomas Coumans (born 16 September 1984) is a Belgian actor. Active in French- and Belgian-language film and television since the mid-2000s, he has appeared in films including Private Lessons (2008), North Sea Texas (2011), The Innocents (2016), Souvenir (2016) and Kika (2025). In 2024, he portrayed Wladzio D'Attainville, the partner and business associate of Spanish fashion designer Cristóbal Balenciaga, in the biographical drama series Cristóbal Balenciaga.

== Early life and training ==
Coumans was born in Belgium on 16 September 1984. His father, Yves Coumans, worked as a theatre director, exposing him to acting and theatre from an early age. Coumans subsequently studied acting at the Institut national supérieur des arts du spectacle et des techniques de diffusion (INSAS) in Brussels, graduating in 2006.

His training also included workshops in Butoh, commedia dell'arte, improvisation, acting for the camera and movement. In 2011, he undertook further dance-theatre training associated with Pina Bausch's Tanztheater.

== Career ==
=== Early work ===
After graduating from INSAS, Coumans began working in theatre, film and television. His early screen appearances included Mr. Average (2006) and Micha Wald's In the Arms of My Enemy (2007).

In 2008, Coumans played Thomas in Joachim Lafosse's drama Private Lessons (Élève libre). He subsequently appeared in Belgian and French television productions including À tort ou à raison and played the title character as a young man in the 2010 television adaptation of Honoré de Balzac's La Peau de chagrin.

His film work during the early 2010s included the role of Zoltan in Bavo Defurne's North Sea Texas (2011) and Roman Morin in Fabienne Godet's Une place sur la Terre (2013).

=== Film and television ===
Coumans continued working across Belgian and French productions during the 2010s. In 2016, he appeared as Gaspard in Anne Fontaine's historical drama The Innocents and as Mathieu Priester in Christophe Barratier's financial drama L'Outsider. He also reunited with director Bavo Defurne for Souvenir, playing Zoltan.

His subsequent credits included Transferts, in which he played David in three episodes, and Fabienne Berthaud's Un monde plus grand.

=== Cristóbal Balenciaga and later work ===
In 2024, Coumans joined the international cast of the Disney+ biographical drama Cristóbal Balenciaga. He portrayed Wladzio D'Attainville, the French-Polish milliner who was Balenciaga's romantic partner and business associate. Coumans appeared alongside Alberto San Juan as Balenciaga, Anouk Grinberg as Coco Chanel, Gemma Whelan as fashion journalist Prudence Glynn and Patrice Thibaud as Christian Dior.

D'Attainville is a major figure in the series' portrayal of Balenciaga's personal and professional life, and Coumans appears in five of its six episodes.

In 2025, Coumans appeared as Paul in Alexe Poukine's feature film Kika, starring Manon Clavel, Makita Samba and Ethelle Gonzalez Lardued. The film was presented during the 2025 Cannes Film Festival in the International Critics' Week programme.

== Selected filmography ==
=== Film ===
| Year | Title | Role | Director |
|---|---|---|---|
| 2006 | Mr. Average | TV presenter | Pierre-Paul Renders |
| 2007 | In the Arms of My Enemy | Anton | Micha Wald |
| 2008 | Private Lessons | Thomas | Joachim Lafosse |
| 2010 | Marieke, Marieke | Charles | Sophie Schoukens |
| 2010 | Vampires | Grâce's boyfriend | Vincent Lannoo |
| 2011 | North Sea Texas | Zoltan | Bavo Defurne |
| 2013 | Une place sur la Terre | Roman Morin | Fabienne Godet |
| 2015 | Lobos sucios | Edgar | Simón Casal |
| 2016 | The Innocents | Gaspard | Anne Fontaine |
| 2016 | L'Outsider | Mathieu Priester | Christophe Barratier |
| 2016 | Un jour mon prince! | Jack | Flavia Coste |
| 2016 | Souvenir | Zoltan | Bavo Defurne |
| 2017 | Le Fidèle | Nardo | Michaël R. Roskam |
| 2019 | Un monde plus grand | Sam | Fabienne Berthaud |
| 2025 | Kika | Paul | Alexe Poukine |

=== Television ===
| Year | Title | Role | Notes |
|---|---|---|---|
| 2009–2016 | À tort ou à raison | Sébastien | |
| 2010 | La Peau de chagrin | Raphaël de Valentin | Television film |
| 2011 | Hard | Yoakim | 1 episode |
| 2011 | Hiver rouge | David Fauvet | Television film |
| 2012 | Le Cerveau d'Hugo | Hugo, aged 22 | Television film |
| 2012 | Clan | Psychopath | 1 episode |
| 2013 | Vaugand | Dylan Thevenot | 1 episode |
| 2014 | Marge d'erreur | Niels Cleven | Television film |
| 2014 | Palace Beach Hotel | Corporal Franck Fisher | Television film |
| 2017 | Transferts | David | 3 episodes |
| 2019 | Mystère à la Sorbonne | François | Television film |
| 2024 | Cristóbal Balenciaga | Wladzio D'Attainville | 5 episodes |
