= After Love (2016 film) =

2016 film directed by Joachim Lafosse

- Film poster
- Directed by: Joachim Lafosse
- Written by: Joachim Lafosse; Fanny Burdino; Thomas Van Zuylen; Mazarine Pingeot
- Produced by: Jacques-Henri Bronckart; Olivier Bronckart; Sylvie Pialat; Benoit Quainon
- Starring: Bérénice Bejo; Cédric Kahn
- Cinematography: Jean-François Hensgens
- Edited by: Yann Dedet
- Distributed by: Le Pacte (France)
- Release dates: 14 May 2016 (Cannes); 8 June 2016 (Belgium)
- Running time: 98 minutes
- Countries: Belgium; France
- Language: French
- Box office: $1.7 million

After Love (French: L'Économie du couple) is a 2016 French-Belgian drama film directed and co-written by Joachim Lafosse. It was screened in the Directors' Fortnight section at the 2016 Cannes Film Festival.

== Cast ==
- Bérénice Bejo as Marie
- Cédric Kahn as Boris
- Marthe Keller as Christine
- Catherine Salée as The friend

== Accolades ==
Award / Film Festival	Category	Recipients and nominees	Result
Belgian Film Critics Association	Best Film		Won
Magritte Awards	Best Film		Nominated
Magritte Awards	Best Director	Joachim Lafosse	Nominated
Magritte Awards	Most Promising Actress	Jade and Margaux Soentjens	Nominated
Magritte Awards	Best Screenplay	Joachim Lafosse	Nominated
Philadelphia Film Festival	Grand Jury Prize		Won
