= Sophie Vercruysse =

Belgian film editor

Sophie Vercruysse is a film editor with, by 2022, more than thirty film credits. She received a Magritte Award for Best Editing for her work in Our Children (2012). Her editing credits also include Private Property (2006), Private Lessons (2008), The White Knights (2015), Baden Baden (2016), Souvenir (2016), Madly in Life (2020), Our Men (2021), and The Experience of Love (2023).
