= Turtles (film) =

2023 Belgian-Canadian drama film

- French: Les Tortues
- Directed by: David Lambert
- Written by: David Lambert
- Produced by: Patrick Quinet
- Starring: Dave Johns; Olivier Gourmet; Brigitte Poupart
- Cinematography: N'gare Falise
- Edited by: Tom Randaxhe
- Music by: Mario Sévigny
- Production company: Artemis Productions
- Distributed by: Outplay; Dark Star Pictures
- Release date: November 8, 2023
- Running time: 83 minutes
- Countries: Belgium; Canada
- Languages: English; French

Turtles (French: Les Tortues) is a Belgian-Canadian drama film, directed by David Lambert and released in 2023. The film stars Dave Johns and Olivier Gourmet as Thom Halford and Henri Janssens, a gay couple in Brussels whose 35-year relationship is threatened after Henri retires from his job as a police officer.

The cast also includes Brigitte Poupart, Vanessa Van Durme, Laurent Bonnet and Joel Gosset.

The film premiered in November 2023 at the Rencontres du cinéma francophone en Beaujolais, and had its North American premiere in March 2024 at SXSW.
