= The First, the Last =

2016 film

- Theatrical release poster
- Directed by: Bouli Lanners
- Written by: Bouli Lanners
- Produced by: Catherine Bozorgan; Jacques-Henri Bronckart; Olivier Bronckart
- Starring: Bouli Lanners; Albert Dupontel
- Cinematography: Jean-Paul De Zaeytijd
- Music by: Pascal Humbert
- Distributed by: Wild Bunch Distribution (France); O'Brother Distribution (Belgium)
- Release dates: 27 January 2016 (France); 24 February 2016 (Belgium)
- Running time: 98 minutes
- Countries: Belgium; France
- Language: French
- Box office: $750,000

The First, the Last (French: Les Premiers, les Derniers) is a Belgian-French drama film written, directed by and starring Bouli Lanners. It was shown in the Panorama section at the 66th Berlin International Film Festival. At Berlin, it won the Prize of the Ecumenical Jury and the Europa Cinemas Label. It received eight nominations at the 7th Magritte Awards, winning five, including Best Film and Best Director for Lanners.

== Cast ==
- Albert Dupontel as Cochise
- Bouli Lanners as Gilou
- Suzanne Clément as Clara
- Michael Lonsdale as Jean-Berchmans
- David Murgia as Willy
- Aurore Broutin as Esther
- Philippe Rebbot as Jésus
- Serge Riaboukine as The Head Hunters
- Lionel Abelanski as The warehouse man
- Max von Sydow as The undertaker

== Production ==
Filming took place between 6 February and 13 March 2015 in Artenay, Toury, Cercottes, Voves and Barmainville.

== Accolades ==
Year	Award	Category	Recipient	Result
2016	Berlin International Film Festival	Label Europa Cinemas	Bouli Lanners	Won
2016	Berlin International Film Festival	Prize of the Ecumenical Jury	Bouli Lanners	Won
2016	Cabourg Film Festival	Swann d'Or for Best Director	Bouli Lanners	Won
2017	Magritte Awards	Best Film		Won
2017	Magritte Awards	Best Director	Bouli Lanners	Won
2017	Magritte Awards	Best Screenplay	Bouli Lanners	Nominated
2017	Magritte Awards	Best Actor	Bouli Lanners	Nominated
2017	Magritte Awards	Best Supporting Actor	David Murgia	Won
2017	Magritte Awards	Best Cinematography	Jean-Paul De Zaeytijd	Nominated
2017	Magritte Awards	Best Production Design	Paul Rouschop	Won
2017	Magritte Awards	Best Costume Design	Elise Ancion	Won
