= Julie Keeps Quiet =

2024 Belgian-Swedish drama film

- Theatrical release poster
- Directed by: Leonardo Van Dijl
- Written by: Leonardo Van Dijl; Ruth Becquart
- Produced by: Gilles Coulier; Gilles De Schryver; Wouter Sap; Roxanne Sarkozi; Delphine Tomson
- Starring: Tessa Van den Broeck; Ruth Becquart; Koen De Bouw; Claire Bodson; Laurent Caron
- Cinematography: Nicolas Karakatsanis
- Edited by: Bert Jacobs
- Music by: Caroline Shaw
- Production companies: De Wereldvrede; Les Films du Fleuve; Hobab; Film i Väst; Blue Morning Pictures; New Europe Film Sales
- Distributed by: Paradiso Films
- Release dates: May 18, 2024 (Cannes); October 16, 2024 (Belgium)
- Running time: 97 minutes
- Countries: Belgium; Sweden
- Languages: Dutch; French
- Box office: $117,322

Julie Keeps Quiet (Dutch: Julie zwijgt) is a 2024 psychological drama film, directed by Leonardo Van Dijl (in his directorial debut) and written by Van Dijl and Ruth Becquart. It stars Tessa Van den Broeck, Ruth Becquart, Koen De Bouw, Claire Bodson and Laurent Caron.

It had its world premiere at the 2024 Cannes Film Festival in the Critics' Week section on 18 May 2024, where it won the Gan Foundation Award for Distribution and SACD Award. The film was chosen as the Belgian entry for the Best International Feature Film at the 97th Academy Awards, but was not nominated.

== Premise ==
At an elite tennis academy, star player Julie's tennis coach Jeremy falls under investigation and is suspended. All of the team players are encouraged to speak up, but Julie chooses to remain silent.

== Cast ==
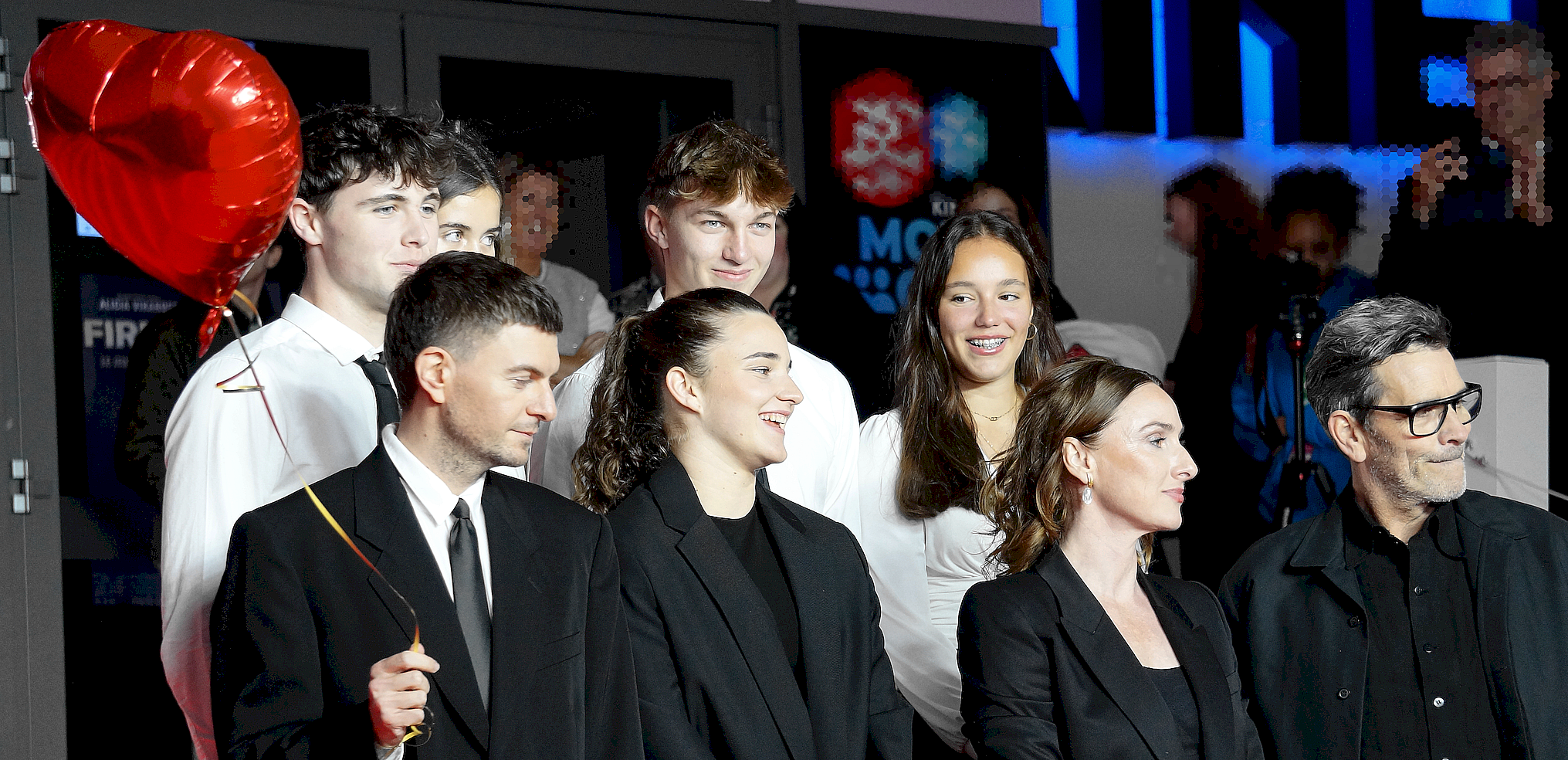

- Tessa Van den Broeck as Julie
- Ruth Becquart as Liesbeth
- Koen De Bouw as Tom
- Claire Bodson as Sofie
- Laurent Caron as Jeremy

== Production ==
In March 2023, it was announced Leonardo Van Dijl would direct the film, from a screenplay he wrote alongside Ruth Becquart, with Les Films du Fleuve set to produce. The Dardenne brothers serve as co-producers, while Florian Zeller and Naomi Osaka serve as an executive producers under their Blue Morning Pictures and Hana Kuma banners, respectively.

== Release ==
It had its world premiere at the 2024 Cannes Film Festival in the Critics' Week section on 18 May 2024. It also screened at the 2024 Toronto International Film Festival on 8 September 2024.

It was released in Belgium on 16 October 2024, by Paradiso Films. In October 2024, Film Movement acquired U.S. distribution rights to the film. It was released in the United States on 28 March 2025. It is scheduled to be released in the United Kingdom on 25 April 2025, by Curzon Film.

== Reception ==
On the review aggregator website Rotten Tomatoes, 93% of 42 critics' reviews are positive, with an average rating of 7.4/10. The website's consensus reads: "Accumulating power and tension thanks to Leonardo Van Dijl's coiled direction and Tessa Van den Broeck's guileless performance, Julie Keeps Quiet is a drama about silence that speaks volumes."

David Ehrlich of IndieWire gave the film a B writing: "This impressive debut feature, cold as a crypt and yet enormously sensitive all at once, is never framed like a mystery, or at least not like the mystery that you might expect from its premise." Guy Lodge of Variety described the film as "a tense, taut, and artfully hushed debut feature", while Peter Bradshaw in The Guardian named it as his Film of the Week, awarding it four stars out of five and calling it "a gripping study in dysfunction and repression."

=== Accolades ===
Award	Date of ceremony	Category	Recipient(s)	Result	Ref.
Magritte Awards	22 February 2025	Best Flemish Film	Julie Keeps Quiet	Won	
Magritte Awards	22 February 2025	Best Supporting Actress	Claire Bodson	Nominated	
Magritte Awards	22 February 2025	Most Promising Actress	Tessa Van Den Broeck	Nominated	

== See also ==
- List of submissions to the 97th Academy Awards for Best International Feature Film
- List of Belgian submissions for the Academy Award for Best International Feature Film
