= Our Children =

2012 film

- Film poster
- French: À perdre la raison
- Literally: To lose one's mind
- Directed by: Joachim Lafosse
- Written by: Joachim Lafosse
- Produced by: Jacques-Henri Bronckart; Olivier Bronckart
- Starring: Émilie Dequenne; Niels Arestrup; Tahar Rahim
- Cinematography: Jean-François Hensgens
- Edited by: Sophie Vercruysse
- Release date: 22 May 2012 (Cannes)
- Running time: 111 minutes
- Countries: Belgium; France
- Languages: French; Arabic
- Budget: $7.2 million
- Box office: $700,000

Our Children (French: À perdre la raison, lit. 'To lose one's mind') is a 2012 Belgian-French psychological drama film directed by Joachim Lafosse. It is based on a real-life incident involving a woman (Geneviève Lhermitte) who killed her five children. The film competed in the Un Certain Regard section at the 2012 Cannes Film Festival under the title Loving Without Reason, where Émilie Dequenne won the Un Certain Regard Award for Best Actress.

== Cast ==
- Émilie Dequenne as Murielle
- Niels Arestrup as André Pinget
- Tahar Rahim as Mounir
- Stéphane Bissot as Françoise
- Mounia Raoui as Fatima
- Redouane Behache as Samir
- Baya Belal as Rachida
- Nathalie Boutefeu as Docteur Declerck
- Claire Bodson as Police Officer

== Reception ==
Critical response was generally strong and the film was nominated for seven Magritte Awards, winning four, including Best Film and Best Director for Lafosse. The film was selected as the Belgian entry for the Best Foreign Language Oscar at the 85th Academy Awards, but it did not make the final shortlist.

The Hollywood Reporter wrote, "In one of her strongest leading roles to date, Dequenne (The Girl on the Train, Rosetta) does a remarkable job depicting Murielle’s wavering psychological states as she heads for oblivion, and an extended sequence-shot where she drives home while singing a Julien Clerc song is particularly unforgettable."

=== Accolades ===
Award	Category	Recipient(s)	Result
Belgian Film Critics Association	André Cavens Award for Best Film		Won
2012 Cannes Film Festival	Un Certain Regard Award – Best Actress	Émilie Dequenne	Won
25th European Film Awards	Best Actress	Émilie Dequenne	Nominated
3rd Magritte Awards	Best Film		Won
3rd Magritte Awards	Best Director	Joachim Lafosse	Won
3rd Magritte Awards	Best Screenplay	Joachim Lafosse, Matthieu Reynaert	Nominated
3rd Magritte Awards	Best Actress	Émilie Dequenne	Won
3rd Magritte Awards	Best Supporting Actress	Stéphane Bissot	Nominated
3rd Magritte Awards	Best Sound	Ingrid Simon, Thomas Gauder	Nominated
3rd Magritte Awards	Best Editing	Sophie Vercruysse	Won
Satellite Awards 2012	Best Actress – Motion Picture	Émilie Dequenne	Nominated
Satellite Awards 2012	Best Foreign Language Film		Nominated
Saint Petersburg international film festival 2012	Best Actress	Émilie Dequenne	Won

== See also ==
- List of submissions to the 85th Academy Awards for Best Foreign Language Film
- List of Belgian submissions for the Academy Award for Best Foreign Language Film
