= Going South (2009 film) =

- Film poster
- Directed by: Sébastien Lifshitz
- Written by: Stéphane Bouquet; Vincent Poymiro; Sébastien Lifshitz
- Produced by: Alexandra Henochsberg; Judith Nora
- Starring: Yannick Renier; Léa Seydoux; Nicole Garcia; Théo Frilet; Pierre Perrier
- Cinematography: Claire Mathon
- Edited by: Stéphanie Mahet
- Music by: Marie Modiano; John Parish; Jocelyn Pook
- Production company: Ad Vitam Production
- Distributed by: Ad Vitam Distribution
- Release date: 30 December 2009
- Running time: 87 minutes
- Country: France
- Language: French

Going South (French: Plein sud) is a 2009 French drama film directed by Sébastien Lifshitz and written by Lifshitz, Stéphane Bouquet and Vincent Poymiro. It stars Yannick Renier, Léa Seydoux, Nicole Garcia, Théo Frilet and Pierre Perrier. It was screened in the Panorama section at the Berlinale 2010.

== Cast ==
- Yannick Renier as Sam
- Léa Seydoux as Léa
- Nicole Garcia as The mother
- Théo Frilet as Mathieu
- Pierre Perrier as Jérémie
- Micheline Presle as The grandmother
- Gérard Watkins as The father
- Marie Matheron as The foster mother
