= Myriem Akheddiou =

Belgian stage and film actress (born 1978)

- Born: 27 September 1978 (age 47); Brussels, Belgium
- Education: Royal Conservatory of Brussels
- Years active: 2010–present
- Partner: Fabrizio Rongione

Myriem Akheddiou (born 27 September 1978) is a Belgian stage and film actress. She studied at the Royal Conservatory of Brussels and began working in theatre after developing an interest in acting. She collaborated with directors Jean-Pierre and Luc Dardenne on a number of films, appearing in The Kid with a Bike (2011), Two Days, One Night (2014), The Unknown Girl (2016), and Young Ahmed (2019).

Her film credits also include A Happy Event (2011), The Connection (2014), and The Benefit of the Doubt (2017), which earned her a Magritte Award nomination in the category of Most Promising Actress.

== Personal life ==
Akheddiou was born in Brussels, Belgium, to a Moroccan father and a Belgian mother. She has a daughter named Selma.

== Selected filmography ==
Year	Title	Role	Notes
2011	The Kid with a Bike	Assistant	
2011	A Happy Event	Nurse	
2014	Two Days, One Night	Mireille	
2014	The Connection	Melle Aissani	
2016	The Unknown Girl	Colleague	
2017	The Benefit of the Doubt	Cathy	Nominated—Magritte Award for Most Promising Actress
2019	Young Ahmed	Inès	Magritte Award for Best Supporting Actress
2021	Titane	Adrien's Mother	Nominated—Magritte Award for Best Supporting Actress
2022	16 Ans		
2023	Avant l'effondrement		
2024	Les Liens Du Sang	Leila	
2025	We Believe You		
