= Catherine Salée =

Belgian actress

- Born: Belgium
- Occupation: Actress
- Years active: 1993–present

Catherine Salée is a Belgian actress.

== Biography ==
From 1991 to 1994, Catherine Salée took classes at the Royal Conservatory of Liège.

== Theater ==
Year	Title	Author	Director
1993	Danton's Death	Georg Büchner	Henri Ronse
1994	Le Pasteur Ephraïm Magnus	Hans Heni Yann	Henri Ronse (2)
1995-96	L'Épreuve	Pierre de Marivaux	Mathias Simons
1996-97	Les Années Fléaux	Norman Spinrad	Frédéric Neige
1997-99	The Exception and the Rule	Bertolt Brecht	Pietro Varrasso
2000	Under Milk Wood	Dylan Thomas	Guillemette Laurens
2000	Sweet	Jeanne Dandoy	Francine Landrain
2001	Downfall	Gregory Motton	Guillaume Istace
2001	De sang froid	Alain Cofino Gomez	Christine Grégoire
2002	Les Space Girls, episode 2435	Catherine Salée & Stéphane Bissot	Elisabeth Ancion
2002	La D-Mission	Joël Napolillo	Elisabeth Ancion (2)
2003	Comme des Couteaux	Marielle Pinsard	Marielle Pinsard
2004	Et votre fumée montera vers le ciel	Heiner Müller	Isabelle Pousseur
2004	L'Instant	Jean-Marie Piemme	Isabelle Pousseur (2)
2004-05	Une Plume est une Plume	Catherine Salée & Jean-Marie Piemme	Isabelle Pousseur (3)
2005-07	La Résistante	Pietro Pizzuti	Guy Theunissen
2006	Est-ce que tu veux m'entendre ?	Catherine Salée & Laurence Vielle	Laurence Vielle
2007-08	Mara / Violaine	Guillemette Laurens	Guillemette Laurens (2)
2007-09	4.48 Psychosis	Sarah Kane	Isabelle Pousseur (4)
2008	Le peuple sans nom (ou la colère du Fleuve)	Layla Nabulsi	Layla Nabulsi
2009	Peau de loup	Caroline Safarian & René Bizac	René Bizac
2010	Biographies d'Ombres	Lars Norén	Isabelle Pousseur (5)
2011	Juste la fin du Monde	Jean-Luc Lagarce	Philippe Sireuil

== Filmography ==
Year	Title	Role	Director	Notes
2004	Folie privée	Pascale	Joachim Lafosse	
2005	The Axe	Lydia	Costa-Gavras	
2005	1 clé pour 2	The woman	Delphine Noels	Short
2005	Lueur bleue	The mother		Short
2007	Private Property	Jan's friend	Joachim Lafosse (2)	
2007	Ça rend heureux	Anne	Joachim Lafosse (3)	Also writer
2007	Le crabe	Myriam	Christophe Hermans & Xavier Seron	Short
2009	Classes vertes	The woman	Alexis Van Stratum	Short
2011	Mauvaise lune	Catherine	Méryl Fortunat-Rossi & Xavier Seron (2)	Short
2012	Mobile Home	Valérie	François Pirot	Nominated - Magritte Award for Best Supporting Actress
2012	Torpedo	Françoise	Matthieu Donck	
2012	Ombline	Isabelle	Stéphane Cazes	
2012	U.H.T	Sophie	Guillaume Senez	Short
2012	Chantou	Chantal	Marion Cozzutti	Short
2012	(Très) Mauvaise lune II	The bar's girl	Méryl Fortunat-Rossi (2) & Xavier Seron (3)	Short
2013	Blue Is the Warmest Colour	Adèle's mother	Abdellatif Kechiche	Magritte Award for Best Supporting Actress
2013	Bal de nuit	Régine	Clémence Madeleine-Perdrillat	Short
2013	Partouze	Brigitte	Matthieu Donck (2)	Short
2014	Two Days, One Night	Juliette	Dardenne brothers	Nominated - Magritte Award for Best Supporting Actress; Nominated - Women Film Critics Circle Award for Best Ensemble
2014	Post partum	Delphine	Delphine Noels (2)	
2014	Vacances	Daughter	Mustapha Souaidi	Short
2014	Taxistop	Patsi	Marie Enthoven	Short
2014	Le desarroi du flic socialiste quechua	Ellle	Emmanuel Marre	Short
2015	Standing Tall	Gladys Vatier	Emmanuelle Bercot	
2015	Melody	Catherine	Bernard Bellefroid	
2015	Une mère	Dance teacher	Christine Carrière	
2015	L'ours noir	The woman	Méryl Fortunat-Rossi (3) & Xavier Seron (4)	Short
2016	The White Knights	Sophie Tinlot	Joachim Lafosse (4)	
2016	After Love	The friend	Joachim Lafosse (5)	
2016	Keeper	Maxime's mother	Guillaume Senez (2)	Magritte Award for Best Supporting Actress
2016	Death by Death	The doctor	Xavier Seron (5)	
2016	Un passager clandestin		Jean-Philippe Dauphin	Short
2016	Le plombier	Catherine	Méryl Fortunat-Rossi (4) & Xavier Seron (6)	Short
2016	The Break	Brigitte Fischer	Matthieu Donck (3)	TV series (10 episodes)
2017	Reinventing Marvin	Odile Bijoux	Anne Fontaine	
2017	Light Thereafter	Julie's Mother	Konstantin Bojanov	
2017	Even Lovers Get the Blues	The sex-shop seller	Laurent Micheli	
2017	Marlon	The judge	Jessica Palud	Short
2017	White Pig	Teacher	Gilles-Ivan Frankignoul	Short
2017	Kapitalistis	The employment advisor	Pablo Munoz Gomez	Short
2017	May Day	Catherine	Fedrik De Beul & Olivier Magis	Short
2017	Ce qui nous tient		Yann Chemin	Short
2018	Jeux d'influence		Jean-Xavier de Lestrade	TV mini-series
2019	Back Home	Nurse	Jessica Palud	
2023	Amal	School headmistress	Jawad Rhalib	Nominated - Magritte Award for Best Supporting Actress
2024	Meanwhile on Earth	Annick	Jérémy Clapin	
