= Les Châteaux de sable =

- Theatrical release poster
- Directed by: Olivier Jahan
- Written by: Olivier Jahan; Diastème
- Produced by: Alexia de Beauvoir; Antoine Morand; Jérôme Vidal
- Starring: Emma de Caunes; Yannick Renier; Jeanne Rosa
- Cinematography: Fabien Benzaquen
- Edited by: Jean-Baptiste Beaudoin
- Music by: Patrick Watson
- Production companies: Noodles Production; Kizmar Films
- Distributed by: La Belle Company
- Release date: 1 April 2015
- Running time: 102 minutes
- Country: France
- Language: French
- Budget: €1 million
- Box office: $210,512

Les Châteaux de sable is a 2015 French romantic drama film directed by Olivier Jahan, starring Emma de Caunes, Yannick Renier and Jeanne Rosa.

== Plot ==
Éléonore is a photographer in her thirties who has just lost her father. She decides to set out for the house which her father had bequeathed her, with Samuel, her former boyfriend.

== Cast ==
- Emma de Caunes as Éléonore
- Yannick Renier as Samuel
- Jeanne Rosa as Claire Andrieux
- Christine Brucher as Maëlle Prigent
- Alain Chamfort as Éléonore's father
- Gaëlle Bona as Laure
- Paul Bandey as Bill
- Nathan Rippy as Alistair
