= Private Lessons (2008 film) =

- Film poster
- Directed by: Joachim Lafosse
- Written by: Joachim Lafosse; François Pirot
- Produced by: Jacques-Henri Bronckart
- Starring: Jonas Bloquet; Jonathan Zaccaï; Yannick Renier
- Cinematography: Hichame Alaouie
- Edited by: Sophie Vercruysse
- Release dates: 19 May 2008 (Cannes); 21 January 2009
- Running time: 105 minutes
- Countries: Belgium; France
- Language: French

Private Lessons (French: Élève libre) is a 2008 Belgian drama film directed by Joachim Lafosse. It was written by Lafosse and François Pirot. It was screened in the Directors' Fortnight section at the 2008 Cannes Film Festival on 19 May. It was nominated for seven Magritte Awards and was awarded Best Actor for Jonathan Zaccaï and Most Promising Actress for Pauline Étienne.

== Cast ==
- Jonas Bloquet as Jonas
- Jonathan Zaccaï as Pierre
- Yannick Renier as Didier
- Claire Bodson as Nathalie
- Pauline Étienne as Delphine
- Anne Coesens as Pascale
- Johan Leysen as Serge
- Thomas Coumans as Thomas

== Accolades ==
Award / Film Festival	Category	Recipients and nominees	Result
Cannes Film Festival	Art Cinema Award		Nominated
Magritte Awards	Best Director	Joachim Lafosse	Nominated
Magritte Awards	Best Actor	Jonathan Zaccaï	Won
Magritte Awards	Best Supporting Actor	Yannick Renier	Nominated
Magritte Awards	Best Supporting Actress	Claire Bodson	Nominated
Magritte Awards	Most Promising Actor	Jonas Bloquet	Nominated
Magritte Awards	Most Promising Actress	Pauline Étienne	Won
Magritte Awards	Best Screenplay	Joachim Lafosse and François Pirot	Nominated
