= Souvenir (2016 film) =

- Film poster
- Directed by: Bavo Defurne
- Written by: Bavo Defurne; Yves Verbraeken; Jacques Boon
- Produced by: Yves Verbraeken, Caroline Bonmarchand
- Starring: Isabelle Huppert; Kévin Azaïs; Johan Leysen
- Cinematography: Philippe Guilbert
- Edited by: Sophie Vercruysse
- Music by: Pink Martini
- Production companies: Bonjour Pictures; Avenue B Productions; Frakas Productions; Deal Production
- Distributed by: ARP Distribution (France); Strand Releasing(USA); Pathé International (World)
- Release dates: 24 August 2016 (Angoulême); 21 December 2016 (France)
- Running time: 90 minutes
- Countries: Belgium; Luxembourg; France
- Language: French

Souvenir is a 2016 romance film directed and co-written by Bavo Defurne. It stars Isabelle Huppert, Kévin Azaïs, and Johan Leysen.

== Plot ==
A single woman Liliane works in a pâté factory having disappeared from public view after a career as 'Laura' a chanteuse and once a finalist in Eurovision. Each day after work she catches the bus home, watches television and drinks too much whisky.

A young boxer, Jean, who comes as a temporary worker to the factory is convinced she is Laura, which she at first denies. He tries to persuade her to make a comeback. She is horrified at being recognized and the thought of singing again. Jean becomes besotted with Liliane and urged on by his father, convinced of her musical talents. He asks Liliane if she will sing at a forthcoming boxing-club party. Liliane agrees and digs out one of her old stage dresses to wear. She sings her big hit, which is received rapturously by the audience, including Jean's father, a big fan. Jean takes Liliane home on his motorbike after the concert, and they become lovers.

He persuades her to come out of retirement and after a defeat in the ring he decides to give up boxing and become her manager. Liliane goes along with this which results in appearances in small and minor venues. She goes to her former manager and ex-husband Tony Jones, who agrees to write incognito some new songs for her. Urged on by Jean, Liliane enters the preliminaries of Eurovision, where Tony Jones is on the jury. Jean begins to suspect that something is going on behind his back and has major row with her. In the finals she performs her song and by popular vote is chosen as the representative for Eurovision. After singing she drinks backstage, and overwhelmed and drunk she collapses on live TV as she is being acclaimed. Jean rushes to her hospital bed.

== Cast ==
- Isabelle Huppert as Liliane Cheverny (Laura)
- Alice D'Hauwe as Young Liliane
- Kévin Azaïs as Jean Leloup
- Johan Leysen as Tony
- Carlo Ferrante as Rudi Riva
- Mickey Hardt as the ambulance man
- Alice D'Hauwe as young Liliane
- Denis Jousselin as Raymond
- Stefan Kampeneers as Vitali Kornev
- Thomas Coumans as Zoltan
- Colette Kieffer as the smiling worker
- Charles Loos as the pianist
- Sophie Mousel as Vanessa

== Background ==
Defurne had the idea for the film "wondering what happened to the people who don’t win singing competitions... What does it feel like to have been in the spotlight and then suddenly find yourself in the shadows? [...] What happens when one returns to anonymity? It’s something that fascinates me". With this in mind, the film "had to bring back to life the star behind the forgotten celebrity. Jean opens a veritable Pandora’s box. The sudden entrance of this young man breathes new life into Liliane’s faded past. ...and in the end, Liliane and Jean are so clearly made for one another that nobody cares about the age difference". For the look of the film Defurne "wanted something magical, I wanted the film to feel like a dream. But the social reality of the characters was also very important to me". The set was created at an "amazing former abattoir in Luxembourg which allowed us to play with contrasts. On the one hand, there’s the massive cold space of the factory, and on the other, we very carefully constructed Liliane’s apartment there. Every detail was key to creating her universe".

Defurne sent his screenplay to Huppert's agent, and after reading it Huppert loved it: "The script was well written, the dialogue was well done, it was quite unusual and had a very powerful sentimental side. And that was confirmed during the shoot with those very dreamlike shots and a dramatic aesthetic in the style of Douglas Sirk. The story was both improbable and charming, and very cinematographic". The tone of the film is tragi-comic.

Azaïs was immediately attracted to working with Huppert. He also "really liked the story. It’s not a regular love story. It’s the tale of a young guy who turns into a man when faced with a more mature woman". He added that [Huppert] "is very rigorous and she was enormously helpful to me. She notices everything, she perceives everything. [...] She supported me in every scene all the time, even when she didn’t feature in it". As Azaïs had done a year of boxing when he was younger he had the basics and it soon came back.

== Music ==
Lauderdale and Defurne had met twelve years previously at the group's first show in Belgium. They stayed in contact and when Defurne sent Lauderdale his first film, North Sea Texas, he told him that he wanted to work with him. For the film, they had two soundtracks in mind : Miles Davis 1958 soundtrack for Elevator to the Gallows and Art Blakey's for Dangerous Liaisons in 1960 - both of which had music improvised over the images; the same process was used with the musicians from Pink Martini in studios in Portland. Defurne and Yves Verbraeken wrote the words for Huppert's three songs to pre-composed music. Lauderdale added that "in this film, there’s a kind of modern sadness, something that reminds me of The Umbrellas of Cherbourg. Souvenir is an optimistic fairytale and I like that. We need joy in our lives and Bavo’s film has that amazing ability to reflect that joy. The film tells us we still have a shot at happiness.

== Reception ==
=== Critical response ===
On review aggregator website Rotten Tomatoes, the film holds an approval rating of 50% based on 28 reviews, with an average rating of 5.6/10. The website's consensus reads: "Souvenir flickers intermittently to life thanks to the reliably great Isabelle Huppert, but ultimately proves too wan and predictable to recommend." Metacritic gave the film a score of 49 out of 100 based on 10 critical reviews, indicating "mixed or average reviews".

The BFI webpage comments that with Souvenir, "Bavo Defurne has created a candy coloured gem – think Pierre et Gilles for design references. With enthralling performances from Huppert and Azaïs, and an original soundtrack by Pink Martini that you'll be singing long afterwards, this is one of the sweetest love stories [of the Festival]".

=== Accolades ===
With Souvenir Bavo Defurne won the VFF Highlight Pitch Award at the Berlinale Co-Production Market in 2014.

Bavo Defurne was nominated for the Ensor (award), the Flanders equivalent of the Oscars, for Best Direction for the film in 2017. Other nominations included Best Make-up, Best Art Direction and Best Actor for Kévin Azaïs. The film won the Ensor for Best Costume Design.
