= Keeper (2015 film) =

2015 European film by Guillaume Senez

- Film poster
- Directed by: Guillaume Senez
- Written by: Guillaume Senez; David Lambert
- Produced by: Isabelle Truc; Élisa Garbar
- Starring: Kacey Mottet Klein; Galatea Bellugi
- Cinematography: Denis Jutzeler
- Edited by: Julie Brenta
- Distributed by: Cinéart (Belgium); Happiness Distribution (France); Filmcoopi Zürich AG (Switzerland)
- Release dates: 7 August 2015 (Locarno); 9 March 2016 (Belgium); 23 March 2016 (France)
- Running time: 95 minutes
- Countries: Belgium; France; Switzerland
- Language: French
- Box office: $30,010

Keeper is a 2015 internationally co-produced drama film directed by Guillaume Senez. It was screened in the Discovery section of the 2015 Toronto International Film Festival.

== Cast ==
- Kacey Mottet Klein as Maxime
- Galatea Bellugi as Mélanie
- Catherine Salée as Maxime's mother
- Sam Louwyck as Maxime's father
- Laetitia Dosch as Mélanie's mother
- Cédric Vieira as The coach

== Accolades ==
Award / Film Festival	Category	Recipients and nominees	Result
Hamburg Film Festival	Young Talent Award	Guillaume Senez	Won
Locarno International Film Festival	Europa Cinemas Label		Won
Magritte Awards	Best Film		Nominated
Magritte Awards	Best Supporting Actor	Sam Louwyck	Nominated
Magritte Awards	Best Supporting Actress	Catherine Salée	Won
Magritte Awards	Best Screenplay	Guillaume Senez and David Lambert	Nominated
Magritte Awards	Best First Feature Film		Won
Magritte Awards	Best Production Design	Florin Dima	Nominated
Magritte Awards	Best Sound	Virginie Messiaen and Franco Piscopo	Nominated
Magritte Awards	Best Editing	Julie Brenta	Won
Taipei Film Festival	International New Talent Competition - Special Jury Prize		Won
Torino Film Festival	Best Feature Film		Won
