= Welcome to the Voice =

Welcome to the Voice is a bilingual opera (French and English) based on an original story and libretto by Muriel Téodori with music composed by Steve Nieve. A first draft was given a workshop performance at the Bell Atlantic Jazz Festival In New York City in 2000. The performance cast was Elvis Costello, Ron Sexsmith, John Flansburgh and students of the Juilliard School of Music. Musicians were Brodsky Quartet, Nieve, and Ned Rothenberg. Following this exploratory first attempt, Welcome to the Voice was expanded. Sting took the lead role and Elvis Costello became the Chief of Police previously interpreted by John Flansburgh. Robert Wyatt replaced Ron Sexsmith in the role of the friend. This completed the extraordinary male cast for the subsequent recording of the work for Deutsch Gramaphon. The female lead role was interpreted by Barbara Bonney as the Diva. She was joined by Amanda Roocroft, Sara Fulgoni and the French opera singer Nathalie Manfrino. The band of improvising musicians was also augmented by the addition of New York guitarist Marc Ribot.

== Synopsis ==
The story concerns a Greek immigrant steelworker Dionysos, who discovers the music of classical opera. It becomes an obsession, when he falls in love with the voice of a young opera singer. His workmates try to persuade him to return to work, but he is determined to live on the steps of the opera house, and meet the woman whose voice has enraptured him. In the night he is visited by ghosts of opera's past (Carmen, Madama Butterfly, and Norma). They tell him he is too much like a character from an opera, that he should kill himself to join them in opera heaven. Dionysos is not convinced by them. The following morning he sees the opera singer in the street; she is shopping for some rare perfume. He cannot stop himself from grabbing her arm. He tries to embrace her. The police stop him, and want to make an example of him.

== Recording ==
In 2007 a studio recording of the work, produced by Nieve/Téodori, was released by Deutsche Grammophon.
