= Sans plomb =

French film by Muriel Téodori

Sans plomb (Without lead - Unleaded) is a French film directed by Muriel Téodori and released in 2000. It is a fictional drama based on an eventful day in the life of a student.

== Background ==
Sans Plomb was the first full-length film by Muriel Téodori but considered a flop. The director felt that this was a result of its release date - the 19th of July in Paris when many people in France are on holiday. It was recorded that only 811 tickets were sold for the film on 15 August 2000 in three Parisian cinemas, and the film was taken off in the capital two weeks later. According to Téodori the distribution policy affected around 20 French films released over the summer. Sans plomb according to Téodori was not a film for that season: "in summer one must release big comedies, not a philosophical and poetic film". Téodori also claimed that de Caunes, would topped the cast, would not promote the film because she had two other films which she prioritized for publicity.

The film was first screened at the Tivoli cinema in Albi before being shown as a selection at the Festival de Cabourg. The action begins and ends in Albi, while the rest of the film is set at a former petrol and service station, restored at the Pessageries, on the road to Cordes. The film has been described as "poetic" calling on viewers to seize life (Carpe diem); through dreaming Ulysse risks life passing him by - he is also a bit out of touch, but doesn't care. The distributors described the film as a "lucid second reading of Homer's Odyssey. Through the play of the actors and the magical music of Elvis Costello, the film manages to create a particular atmosphere, a daydream with screaming colors. The film shifts gracefully between the tender and the comic".

The scenario is by Téodori and Alexia Stresi, with photographic direction by Pascal Gennesseaux and sound by Guillaume Sciama. The film had a budget of 9 million francs, and lasts 91 minutes.

== Synopsis ==
Ulysse, a student of meteorology, and fan of the music of Elvis Costello, works Saturday in an isolated petrol station opposite which lives Marie, a girl his age, with her father in an abandoned garage. Marie wants Ulysse to cross the road and chat with her and tries insistently to catch his attention, but to no avail (despite the urging of his friend Ken) as he is a shy dreamer. Ulysse also stutters when under stress. So convinced is Ulysse that nothing extraordinary will happen to him that he keeps a record of routine events in his life. Two English crooks, Anton et Mirek, are meanwhile criss-crossing the region in an old van to find the petrol station where they hid in the toilets the results of a robbery. Young thugs smash up the shop. Over the day Ulysse meets a siren, cyclops, minotaur, and realizes that he must take hold of his life.

== Cast ==
- Emma de Caunes : Marie
- Alexis Loret : Ulysse
- Éric Caravaca : Ken
- Miki Manojlovic : Salomon, Ulysse's boss
- Alain Souchon : The cyclops
- Elvis Costello : himself
- Michael Maloney : Anton
- Julian Kerridge : Mirek
- Irène Tassembédo : Patience
- Jean-Claude Bourbault : Marie's father
- Marie-Catherine Conti : The siren
- Guillaume Laffly : Postman
- Bernard Ballet : Ambulanceman

== Music ==
The Costello songs used in the film are "Big Boys", "Beyond Belief", "Shot with His Own Gun", "Shabby doll", "Alison", "Waiting for the End of the World", "Red Shoes", "Favourite Hours", "Complicated Shadows", and "Poor Fractured Atlas". "Je voulais te dire que je t'attends" by Michel Jonasz and "Jour après jour" by Jean-Loup Dabade are also quoted. The rest of the soundtrack is by long-time Costello collaborator, and Téodori's husband, Steve Nieve.

== Production ==
Filming took place in the Tarn department.
