= Restons groupés =

- Directed by: Jean-Paul Salomé
- Written by: Bruno Dega; Jean-Paul Salomé
- Produced by: Alain Bourboulon; Frédéric Bourboulon; Alain Sarde
- Cinematography: Jean-Claude Larrieu
- Edited by: Michèle Robert-Lauliac
- Music by: Alexandre Desplat
- Distributed by: BAC Films
- Release date: 2 September 1998 (France)
- Running time: 101 minutes
- Country: France
- Language: French
- Budget: $5.3 million
- Box office: $6.2 million

Restons groupés is a 1998 French comedy film by Jean-Paul Salomé, starring Emma de Caunes, Samuel Le Bihan, Bruno Solo, Bernard Le Coq, and Estelle Larrivaz.

== Cast ==
- Emma de Caunes as Claire
- Samuel Le Bihan as Mathias
- Bruno Solo as Jeff
- Bernard Le Coq as Jean-Michel
- Estelle Larrivaz as Suzy
- Judith Henry as Elvira
- Hubert Koundé as Aimé
- Bruno Lochet as Gwenaël
- Antoinette Moya as Lyliane
- Claire Nadeau as Nicole
- Michel Robin as Raymond
- Jorge Cervera Jr. as Emilio
- Vincent Schiavelli as Gary
- Debra Christofferson as Kathy
- Abbes Zahmani as Max
