= Father & Soldier =

2022 French-Senegalese film

- French: Tirailleurs
- Directed by: Mathieu Vadepied
- Screenplay by: Olivier Demangel; Mathieu Vadepied
- Produced by: Bruno Nahon; Omar Sy
- Starring: Omar Sy; Alassane Diong; Jonas Bloquet
- Cinematography: Luis Armando Arteaga
- Edited by: Xavier Sirven
- Music by: Alexandre Desplat
- Production companies: Unité; Korokoro
- Distributed by: Gaumont (France); Pathé BC Afrique (Senegal)
- Release dates: 18 May 2022 (Cannes Film Festival); 4 January 2023 (France); 6 January 2023 (Senegal)
- Running time: 109 minutes
- Countries: France; Senegal
- Languages: French; Fulani
- Budget: $14 million
- Box office: $8.5 million

Father & Soldier (French: Tirailleurs, meaning "skirmishers" or "riflemen") is a 2022 war-drama film directed and co-written by Mathieu Vadepied, starring Omar Sy, Alassane Diong, and Jonas Bloquet. A French-Senegalese production, its producers included Omar Sy and Bruno Nahon. The film opened the Un Certain Regard section in competition at the 75th Cannes Film Festival on 18 May 2022, and was released in theaters in France by Gaumont on 4 January 2023, and in Senegal by Pathé BC Afrique on 6 January 2023.

== Plot ==
In 1917, Bakary Diallo (Omar Sy), a Senegalese man, works on a farm with his son, Thierno (Alassane Diong). One day, the French army arrives to round up young men for forced enlistment. Thierno tries to flee but is captured. Hoping to save his son from the horrors of war, Bakary decides to enlist in the French army himself, intending to desert alongside Thierno. Their first attempt fails, and both father and son are sent to the front lines in eastern France.

While Bakary searches for a way to get Thierno away from the front—attempting to secure him a position in the mess hall—Thierno distinguishes himself through his courage during an assault. He is promoted to corporal by the young Lieutenant Chambreau (Jonas Bloquet), who takes him under his wing, effectively making Thierno his father’s superior officer. Bakary sees this as a potential opening for them both to eventually be transferred to the rear, but Thierno, eager to prove his bravery, clashes with his father; he remains convinced that his service will one day earn him French citizenship.

Bakary begins planning his desertion, learning of a possible escape route: traveling to Le Havre to catch a ship back to Africa. As he continues to gather the funds needed to pay smugglers, he discovers that Thierno has been assigned—alongside Lieutenant Chambreau—to a small commando unit tasked with seizing a German bunker on a nearby hill; it is a near-suicidal mission. On the day of the operation, Bakary convinces Thierno to leave with him for Le Havre, but along the way, Thierno quietly turns back, unwilling to betray the trust Chambreau has placed in him. Bakary returns to the front in the middle of the night, after the assault has already begun.

Bakary manages to cross the combat lines and reach the bunker. He rescues Thierno and Chambreau, who had been taken prisoner by the Germans. Thierno has sustained an injury to his right arm. Bakary intends to leave with his son, but they are held at gunpoint by Chambreau, who ultimately allows them both to go. To buy them time, Chambreau sacrifices himself by holding off as many Germans as possible. However, as they make their way across the battlefield, Bakary is struck by German gunfire and mortally wounded. Thierno is forced to leave his father behind on the battlefield.

Following the battle, Lieutenant Chambreau is posthumously awarded the Legion of Honour by his father, the general. Thierno is awarded the *Croix de Guerre* with a vermeil star. As he and his battalion head back to the rear, they pass the hanging corpses of soldiers who had attempted to flee toward Le Havre with the help of a smuggler. When the war ends, Thierno returns alone to his village in Senegal, bearing several war decorations.

In 1920, soldiers exhume Bakary’s remains to take them to Paris; it is implied that his body may have been chosen—from among the remains of eight soldiers—to represent the Unknown Soldier, who now rests beneath the Arc de Triomphe.

== Cast ==
- Omar Sy as Bakary Diallo
- Alassane Diong as Thierno
- Jonas Bloquet as Lieutenant Chambreau
- Bamar Kane as Salif
- Oumar Sey as Abdoulaye

== Production ==
With a $14 million budget, the film was produced by Bruno Nahon's Unité and Omar Sy's Korokoro in co-production with Gaumont, France 3 Cinéma, Mille Soleils and Sy Possible Africa. It was co-produced by Mathieu Vadepied, with Maryvonne Le Meur and Caroline Nataf serving as associate producers. The screenplay was written by Vadepied and Olivier Demangel.

Alexandre Desplat composed the original music for the film.

== Filming ==
The film was shot in France from 23 August 2021 to 13 October 2021, before moving on to Senegal in January 2022. It was partially shot in Neufmaison, Ardennes.

== Release ==
A 1-minute clip from the film was released on Le HuffPost's YouTube channel on 19 May 2022. On 10 November 2022, the film's official poster and official trailer were released.

The film had its world premiere at the 75th Cannes Film Festival as the opening film in the Un Certain Regard section on 18 May 2022. It will be distributed in France and internationally by Gaumont. It was released in French cinemas on 4 January 2023, and in Senegal by Pathé BC Afrique on 6 January 2023.

== Reception ==
Rotten Tomatoes gives the film a score of 83% based on 6 reviews.

AlloCiné, a French cinema website, gave the film an average rating of 3.3/5, based on a survey of 27 French reviews.

=== Box Office ===
The film sold over 55,000 tickets on its first day of release in France, with 2,034 viewers per screening in 554 theaters. During its first weekend of release, Father & Soldier sold over 456,000 tickets, ranking number two at the box office, behind Avatar: The Way of Water (1,6 million entries), and in front of Puss in Boots: The Last Wish (168,061 entries)

== Accolades ==
Award	Date of ceremony	Category	Recipient(s)	Result	Ref(s)
Cannes Film Festival	27 May 2022	Un Certain Regard	Mathieu Vadepied	Nominated	
Festival France Odéon de Florence	28 October 2022	Feuille d'or pour la musique	Alexandre Desplat	Nominated	
