= The Skin of Sorrow =

2010 film directed by Alain Berliner

- Based on: La Peau de chagrin by Honoré de Balzac
- Written by: Alain Berliner; Alexandra Deman
- Directed by: Alain Berliner
- Starring: Thomas Coumans
- Music by: Guillaume Roussel
- Countries of origin: France; Belgium
- Original language: French

Production
- Cinematography: Philippe Lardon
- Editor: Sabine Emiliani
- Running time: 98 minutes

Original release
- Network: La Une (Belgium)
- Release: 24 April 2010
- Network: France 2 (France)
- Release: 22 September 2010

The Skin of Sorrow (French: La Peau de chagrin) is a 2010 television drama film directed by Alain Berliner. It is set in 1832 and follows a 22-year-old man whose wishes are granted through a magic piece of shagreen skin, but each wish brings him closer to an early death. It is based on the novel La Peau de chagrin by Honoré de Balzac. It was broadcast on France 2 on 22 September 2010.

The film received Prix des Collégiens de Charente Maritime at the 12th Festival de la fiction in La Rochelle.

== Cast ==
- Thomas Coumans as Raphaël de Valentin
- Annabelle Hettmann as Pauline
- Julien Honoré as Rastignac
- Mylène Jampanoï as Fedora
- Jean-Pierre Marielle as Oswald
