= Young Ahmed =

2019 drama film

- Promotional poster
- French: Le Jeune Ahmed
- Directed by: Luc Dardenne; Jean-Pierre Dardenne
- Written by: Jean-Pierre; Luc Dardenne
- Produced by: Jean-Pierre; Luc Dardenne; Denis Freyd
- Starring: Idir Ben Addi; Olivier Bonnaud; Myriem Akheddiou; Victoria Bluck; Claire Bodson
- Cinematography: Benoît Dervaux
- Edited by: Marie-Hélène Dozo; Tristan Meunier
- Production companies: Les Films du Fleuve; Archipel 35
- Distributed by: Cinéart (Belgium); Diaphana Films (France)
- Release dates: 20 May 2019 (Cannes); 22 May 2019 (Belgium & France)
- Running time: 84 minutes
- Countries: Belgium; France
- Language: French
- Box office: $1.5 million

Young Ahmed (French: Le Jeune Ahmed) is a 2019 Belgian drama film written, produced and directed by Jean-Pierre and Luc Dardenne. A co-production of Belgium and France, it stars Idir Ben Addi in the titular role, as a young Belgian teenager boy attempted to embrace Islamic extremism. It also stars Olivier Bonnaud, Myriem Akheddiou, Victoria Bluck, and Claire Bodson in supporting roles.

The film had its world premiere in the main competition of the 2019 Cannes Film Festival on 20 May, where it won the Best Director prize. It was theatrically released in Belgium and France by Cinéart and Diaphana Films, respectively, on 22 May. It received positive reviews, and was nominated for the César Award for Best Foreign Film.

== Plot ==
Ahmed is a teenaged Muslim living with his family in Seraing. Recently, under the influence of his imam Youssouf and the death of a cousin, who was a devout Muslim, Ahmed has not only made Islamic practice central to his life but adopted an extreme interpretation of the Quran. This change has not escaped the notice of Madame Inès, a fellow Muslim and teacher at Ahmed’s school who provides extra attention to him given his dyslexia.

Inès proposes adding Arabic instruction through music to help students expand their practical vocabulary and holds a community meeting to discuss this. Youssouf tells Ahmed and his brother Rachid that she is an apostate and blasphemer intent on bringing down Islam as a religion and convinces them to join the meeting. During the meeting, the attendees are divided when the brothers claim that Inès’ decision will cause Islam to vanish and accuse her of not caring because her new boyfriend is Jewish. Pressed further, they do not answer and leave.

Inès finds Ahmed with Youssouf and offers to reconcile with the former; he appears unmoved. However, after prayer, Ahmed makes preparations to assassinate her. Gaining entry into Inès’ apartment building, Ahmed hides in the stairwell, waiting for her to appear. When she sees him, he makes his attempt but fails. Escaping to Youssouf’s, the imam divests himself of any responsibility for the incident, refuses to hide him, compels him to accept his punishment, and gives him a scripted answer for the police’s questions to protect their mosque.

Ahmed is confined to a juvenile detention center but he is uncomfortable with the supportive atmosphere and rejects farmwork offered to him. His mother visits, revealing that Inès wants to meet him, but he refuses. She also shares that Rachid testified against Youssouf and the latter has been arrested, but he remains firm in his ideological conviction, causing her to break down in tears and implore him to change.

Some time later, Ahmed requests farmwork again and calls his mother, telling her that he is willing to meet Inès but the psychologist needs to meet him first. Following a meeting with the psychologist where he expresses his belief that a meeting with Inès will help him to understand the nature of his assassination attempt, Ahmed writes a letter to his mother, asking for forgiveness as he strives to fulfill his duty as a true Muslim, but as he is escorted to meet Inès, he disguises it as a list of requests to be given to his mother. Prior to the meeting, he goes to the bathroom and hides a ballpoint pen in his sock. As Inès enters the room, Ahmed reaches for it but she breaks down at the sight of him and exits before he can act. As Ahmed leaves the meeting, he has the letter returned to him and is encouraged to continue farmwork.

The farm is owned by a family with a caucasian teenage daughter named Louise. She quickly develops romantic interest in Ahmed and during a break in work, kisses him against his will. He is taken aback and obliges with another kiss. However, he ultimately refuses to continue and apologizes for his premarital intimate contact during prayer. Before leaving, he asks Louise whether she will convert to Islam to atone for his sin; she will not. Just as he is about to leave the compound, he finds Louise again and confronts her in a hayloft, asking her why she will not become a Muslim if she is attracted to him. She claims that she will not be forced and when he asks if she intends to prevent him from entering Heaven, she bluntly tells him that it does not exist, leading him to push her onto the hay and leave for good.

On the drive back to the detention center, Ahmed complains of feeling too hot. Getting permission from his caseworker to remove his seatbelt to take off his jacket, he uses the opportunity to open the car door and escape into the nearby woods. After losing the caseworker, he rides a bus to Inès’ school. There, he finds the doors locked, so he scales walls to enter through a window. However, in his efforts, he pulls something fixed to a wall off of it, the momentum causing him to fall to the ground. Though almost immobilized and in great pain, Ahmed manages to move his body close to a metal fence and remove a metal tool from his jacket, with which he uses to strike the fence repeatedly. Inès hears the noise and runs out to find him, offering to call an ambulance. As she prepares to return to the schoolhouse to do so, Ahmed asks Inès to forgive him. She nods and holds his hand with hers briefly before going back into the building.

== Cast ==
- Idir Ben Addi as Ahmed
- Olivier Bonnaud as Caseworker
- Myriem Akheddiou as Inès
- Victoria Bluck as Louise
- Claire Bodson as Mother
- Othmane Moumen as Imam Youssouf
- Amine Hamidou as Rachid
- Yassine Tarsimi as Abdel
- Frank Onana as Fouad
- Laurent Caron as Mathieu
- Annette Closset as Sandrine
- Marc Zinga as Juge
- Ben Hamidou as Amine
- Monia Douieb as Amina

== Reception ==
=== Critical response ===
On review aggregator website Rotten Tomatoes, the film holds an approval rating of 59% based on 82 reviews, with an average rating of 6.5/10. The site's critical consensus reads, "Young Ahmed doesn't represent the Dardennes brothers' most developed work, but solid acting and a socially conscious story help compensate for its flaws." Metacritic, which uses a weighted average, assigned the film a score of 66 out of 100, based on 21 critics, indicating "generally favorable reviews".

=== Accolades ===
Award / Film Festival	Category	Recipients and nominees	Result
Cannes Film Festival	Palme d'Or		Nominated
Cannes Film Festival	Best Director	Jean-Pierre and Luc Dardenne	Won
César Award	Best Foreign Film		Nominated
Lumière Awards	Best International Co-Production		Nominated
Magritte Award	Best Film		Nominated
Magritte Award	Best Director	Jean-Pierre and Luc Dardenne	Nominated
Magritte Award	Best Screenplay	Jean-Pierre and Luc Dardenne	Nominated
Magritte Award	Best Supporting Actor	Othmane Moumen	Nominated
Magritte Award	Best Supporting Actress	Myriem Akheddiou	Won
Magritte Award	Best Supporting Actress	Claire Bodson	Nominated
Magritte Award	Most Promising Actor	Idir Ben Addi	Won
Magritte Award	Most Promising Actress	Victoria Bluck	Nominated
Magritte Award	Best Editing	Marie-Hélène Dozo	Nominated
Valladolid International Film Festival	Best Film		Nominated
Valladolid International Film Festival	Best Screenplay	Jean-Pierre and Luc Dardenne	Won
Valladolid International Film Festival	Best Editing	Marie-Hélène Dozo and Tristan Meunier	Won
