= Private Property (2006 film) =

- Theatrical release poster
- Directed by: Joachim Lafosse
- Written by: Joachim Lafosse; François Pirot
- Produced by: Joseph Rouschop
- Starring: Isabelle Huppert; Jérémie Renier; Yannick Renier
- Cinematography: Hichame Alaouié
- Edited by: Sophie Vercruysse
- Release dates: 1 September 2006 (Venice); 24 January 2007 (Belgium)
- Countries: France; Belgium
- Language: French
- Budget: $2.5 million
- Box office: $545.473

Private Property (French: Nue Propriété) is a 2006 French-language Belgian film directed by Joachim Lafosse. The film received the André Cavens Award for Best Film by the Belgian Film Critics Association (UCC).

== Title ==
Nue propriété is French for bare ownership/property, i.e., without usufruct. In the film a woman considers selling the house in which she lives with her twin sons. The sons oppose this. They get support from their father, who claims bare ownership of the house, and wants to keep it for the twins.

== Plot ==
Two young adult non-identical twin men, François and Thierry, still live with their mother. They are very close, e.g. they bathe together and wash each other's hair.

They are very upset when their mother wants to sell the house. The situation gets tense and the mother leaves the house for an indefinite time. The good relation between the twins deteriorates. In a fight one gets very badly injured. The other panics and feels guilty.

== Cast ==
- Isabelle Huppert as Pascale
- Jérémie Renier as Thierry
- Yannick Renier as François
- Kris Cuppens as Jan
- Patrick Descamps as Luc
- Raphaëlle Lubansu as Anne
- Sabine Riche as Gerda
- Dirk Tuypens as Dirk
- Catherine Salée as Jan's friend
- Philippe Constant as Jan's friend
- Delphine Bibet as Karine

== See also ==
- Isabelle Huppert on screen and stage
