= The White Knights =

- Theatrical release poster
- Directed by: Joachim Lafosse
- Written by: Joachim Lafosse; Bulle Decarpentries; Thomas van Zuylen; Zélia Abadie; Thomas Bidegain (participation)
- Produced by: Jacques-Henri Bronckart; Olivier Bronckart; Sylvie Pialat
- Starring: Vincent Lindon; Louise Bourgoin; Valérie Donzelli; Reda Kateb
- Cinematography: Jean-François Hensgens
- Edited by: Sophie Vercruysse
- Music by: Sascha Ring
- Production companies: Versus Production; Les Films du Worso
- Distributed by: O'Brother Distribution (Belgium); Le Pacte (France)
- Release dates: 30 August 2015 (Angoulême); 20 January 2016 (France)
- Running time: 112 minutes
- Countries: Belgium; France
- Language: French
- Budget: $9 million
- Box office: $1.5 million

The White Knights (French: Les Chevaliers Blancs) is a 2015 Belgian-French drama film directed by Joachim Lafosse and inspired by the events of the Zoé's Ark controversy in 2007. The film stars Vincent Lindon, Louise Bourgoin, Valérie Donzelli and Reda Kateb. It was selected to screen in the Platform section of the 2015 Toronto International Film Festival. It was screened in the San Sebastián International Film Festival where Joachim Lafosse won the Silver Shell for Best Director.

== Cast ==
- Vincent Lindon as Jacques Arnault
- Louise Bourgoin as Laura Turine
- Valérie Donzelli as Françoise Dubois
- Reda Kateb as Xavier Libert
- Stéphane Bissot as Marie Latour
- Raphaëlle Lubansu as Nathalie Joris
- Jean-Henri Compère as Roland Duchâteau
- Philippe Rebbot as Luc Debroux
- Yannick Renier as Chris Laurent
- Tatiana Rojo as Christine Momboza
- Catherine Salée as Sophie Tinlot
- Luc Van Grunderbeeck as Yves Meynard
- Tibo Vandenborre as Peter Demineur
- Filip Peeters as Lieutenant Reykart
- Alain Eloy as Lieutenant Liénart

== Production ==
The screenplay was written by Joachim Lafosse, Bulle Decarpentries, Thomas van Zuylen and Zélia Abadie, with the participation of Thomas Bidegain. The film was produced by Belgium’s Versus Production and Les Films du Worso in France, with co-production support from France 3 Cinéma, RTBF, Belgacom and Prime Time. The film is also supported by the Centre du Cinéma et de l’Audiovisuel of the Federation Wallonia-Brussels and the Belgian Federal Government Tax Shelter. Filming began on 17 March 2014, in the region of Erfoud in Morocco, and lasted for eight weeks.

== Accolades ==
Year	Award	Category	Recipient	Result
2016	Hong Kong International Film Festival	SIGNIS Award	Joachim Lafosse	Nominated
2016	Philadelphia Film Festival	Grand Jury Prize	Joachim Lafosse	Nominated
2016	San Sebastián International Film Festival	Best Director	Joachim Lafosse	Won
2016	San Sebastián International Film Festival	Best Film	Joachim Lafosse	Nominated
2016	Toronto International Film Festival	Platform Prize	Joachim Lafosse	Nominated
