= Stéphane Bouquet =

French writer, screenwriter and critic (1967–2025)

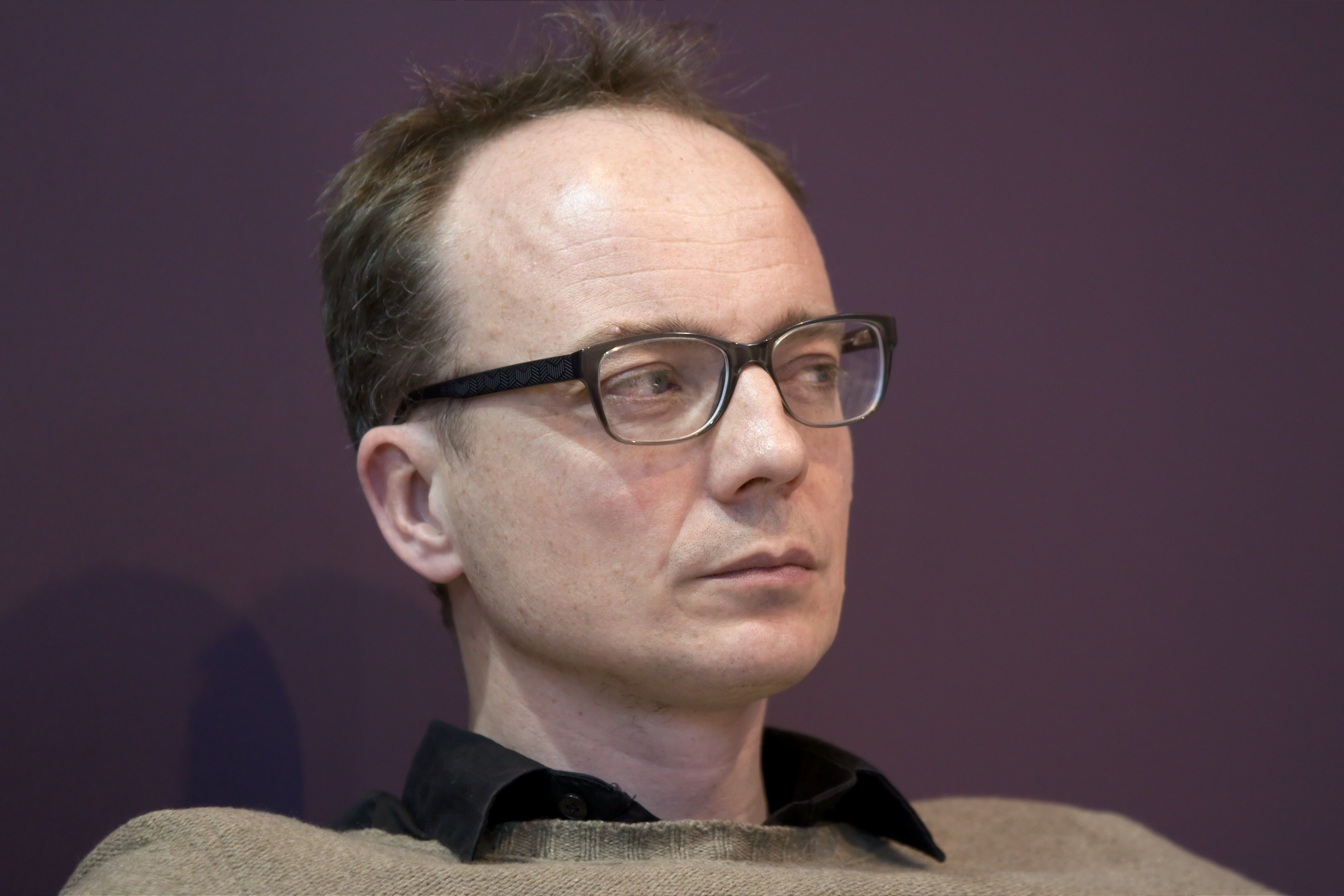
- Bouquet in 2010
- Born: 31 October 1967; Paris, France
- Died: 24 August 2025 (aged 57)
- Occupations: Writer; critic; actor
- Years active: 1980–2025

Stéphane Bouquet (31 October 1967 – 24 August 2025) was a French writer, screenwriter and critic.

Bouquet was born in Paris on 31 October 1967, and died on 24 August 2025, at the age of 57.

== Filmography ==
=== As screenwriter ===
- 1996: Il faut que je l'aime
- 1998: Les Corps ouverts
- 1999: Les Terres froides
- 2000: Presque rien
- 2001: La Traversée
- 2002: La défaite du rouge-gorge
- 2002: Le pays du chien qui chante
- 2004: Wild Side
- 2005: Torse
- 2009: Going South

=== As actor ===
- 2011: Iris in Bloom
