= The Experience of Love =

2023 film directed by Ann Sirot and Raphaël Balboni

- Film poster
- Directed by: Ann Sirot; Raphaël Balboni
- Written by: Ann Sirot; Raphaël Balboni
- Produced by: Julie Esparbes
- Starring: Lucie Debay; Lazare Gousseau
- Cinematography: Jorge Piquer Rodríguez
- Edited by: Sophie Vercruysse; Raphaël Balboni
- Production companies: Hélicotronc; Tripode Productions
- Release dates: 20 May 2023 (Cannes); 20 September 2023
- Running time: 89 minutes
- Countries: Belgium; France
- Language: French

The Experience of Love (stylized as The (Ex)perience of Love, French: Le Syndrome des amours passées) is a 2023 comedy-drama film written and directed by Ann Sirot and Raphaël Balboni. It centers around a couple, Sandra and Rémy (played by Lucie Debay and Lazare Gousseau), who struggle with infertility caused by a condition known as the syndrome of past loves. To overcome this, they are told they must reconnect with all their former lovers.

The film had its world premiere at the 76th Cannes Film Festival during the Critics' Week on 20 May 2023. At the 13th Magritte Awards, The Experience of Love received eight nominations, including Best Film and Best Director for Sirot and Balboni, and went on to win Most Promising Actor for Gousseau and Best Editing for Balboni and Sophie Vercruysse.

== Cast ==
- Lucie Debay as Sandra
- Lazare Gousseau as Rémi
- Nora Hamzawi as Julie, Rémi's sister
- Ninon Borséi as Justine, Sandra's sister
- Florence Loiret Caille as Marion
- Ana Rodriguez as Nora
- Florence Janas as Céline
- Hervé Piron as Stéphane
- Douglas Grauwels as Koen
- Alice Dutoit as Ana, Koen's partner
- Vincent Lecuyer as Dr. De Coninck

== Critical reception ==
On review aggregator website AlloCiné, the film holds an average score of three and a half stars out of five, based on a survey of 21 reviews.

== Accolades ==
Award / Film Festival	Category	Recipients and nominees	Result
Brussels International Film Festival	Grand Prix		Nominated
Golden Ibis Award	Best Film		Won
Golden Ibis Award	Best Original Score	Julie Roué	Nominated
Magritte Awards	Best Film		Nominated
Magritte Awards	Best Director	Ann Sirot and Raphaël Balboni	Nominated
Magritte Awards	Best Screenplay	Ann Sirot and Raphaël Balboni	Nominated
Magritte Awards	Best Actress	Lucie Debay	Nominated
Magritte Awards	Most Promising Actor	Lazare Gousseau	Won
Magritte Awards	Best Costume Design	Frédérick Denis	Nominated
Magritte Awards	Best Production Design	Julien Dubourg	Nominated
Magritte Awards	Best Editing	Sophie Vercruysse and Raphaël Balboni	Won
