= Death by Death =

- Theatrical release poster
- Directed by: Xavier Seron
- Written by: Xavier Seron
- Produced by: François Cognard; Olivier Dubois
- Starring: Jean-Jacques Rausin; Myriam Boyer
- Cinematography: Olivier Vanaschen
- Edited by: Julie Naas
- Release date: 3 May 2016 (Belgium)
- Running time: 90 minutes
- Countries: Belgium; France
- Language: French

Death by Death (French: Je me tue à le dire) is a 2016 Belgian black-comedy film directed by Xavier Seron. It premiered at the 2016 Palm Springs International Film Festival. The film received seven nominations at the 7th Magritte Awards, including Best Film and Best Director for Seron.

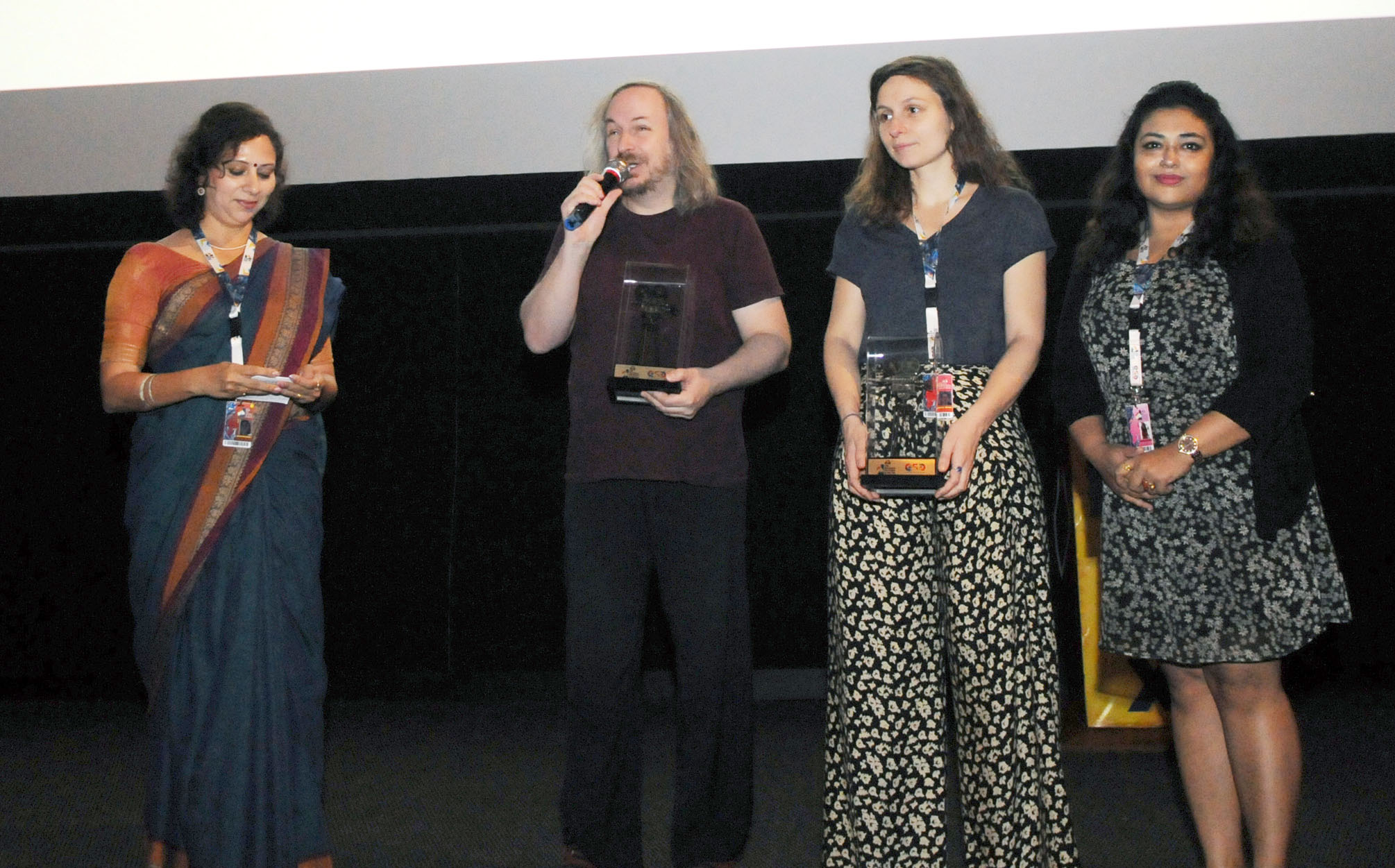
Director Xavier Seron (second from left), at the presentation of the film during IFFI (2016)

== Cast ==
- Jean-Jacques Rausin as Michel Peneud
- Myriam Boyer as Monique Peneud
- Fanny Touron as Aurélie
- Serge Riaboukine as Darek
- Catherine Salée as The doctor
- Jackie Berroyer as The waiting man

== Accolades ==
Award / Film Festival	Category	Recipients and nominees	Result
Annonay International Film Festival	Grand Jury Prize		Nominated
Buenos Aires International Film Festival	Best Film		Nominated
Buenos Aires International Film Festival	Best Cinematography	Olivier Vanaschen	Won
Magritte Awards	Best Film		Nominated
Magritte Awards	Best Director	Xavier Seron	Nominated
Magritte Awards	Best Actor	Jean-Jacques Rausin	Won
Magritte Awards	Best Screenplay	Xavier Seron	Won
Magritte Awards	Best First Feature Film		Nominated
Magritte Awards	Best Sound	Arnaud Calvar, Julien Mizac, Philippe Charbonnel	Nominated
Magritte Awards	Best Editing	Julie Naas	Nominated
Milwaukee Film Festival	Best Film		Nominated
Namur International Film Festival	Best Film		Nominated
Namur International Film Festival	Cinevox Award		Won
Odesa International Film Festival	Best Director	Xavier Seron	Won
Palm Springs International Film Festival	Grand Jury Prize		Won

== See also ==
- List of black-and-white films produced since 1970
