= Yannick Renier =

Belgian actor

- Born: 29 March 1975 (age 51); Brussels, Belgium
- Occupation: Actor

Yannick Renier (born 29 March 1975) is a Belgian actor who started his career in the theatre in the 1990s and has since appeared in several films and television productions.

== Life and career ==
Renier trained at the Conservatoire Royal in Brussels and started his professional acting career in 1995, appearing in many stage productions of both classical and modern drama. Renier's first full-length film was Miss Montigny in 2004.

He became widely known in Belgium in 2006 through his role in the first series of the television drama Septième Ciel Belgique. He then played opposite Isabelle Huppert and his half-brother Jérémie in the film Nue Propriété, and has since appeared in other roles including the lead part of Yves in the 2008 Nés en 68. He was awarded Best Male Newcomer for Yves in Nés en 68 at the 2008 Cabourg Film Festival. For his role in Private Lessons (Élève libre), Renier was nominated for Best Supporting Actor at the 1st Magritte Awards.

== Filmography ==
- 1996 : Le Nombril de Saint-Gilles – dir. Christophe Sermet
- 2001 : Un portrait – dir. Philippe Murgier
- 2002 : Une fille de joie – dir. Olivier van Malderghem
- 2004 : Loin des Yeux – dir. Serge Mirzabekiantz
- 2004 : Miss Montigny – dir. Miel van Hoogenbemt
- 2006 : Septième Ciel Belgique (TV serial)
- 2006 : Nue Propriété – dir. Joachim Lafosse
- 2007 : Les Chansons d'amour – dir. Christophe Honoré
- 2007 : Coupable – dir. Laetitia Masson
- 2008 : Nés en 68 – dir. Olivier Ducastel and Jacques Martineau
- 2008 : Private Lessons – dir Joachim Lafosse
- 2009 : Une petite zone de turbulences
- 2009 : Going South
- 2010 : Small World
- 2011 : Toutes nos envies – dir. Philippe Lioret
- 2011 : Early One Morning
- 2015 : Les Châteaux de sable
- 2015 : The White Knights
- 2016 : Tout de suite maintenant
- 2017 : Patients
- 2021 : Mother Schmuckers
- 2022 : House of Lust
- 2025 : Reflection in a Dead Diamond
