= Muriel Téodori =

French psychoanalyst, writer, filmmaker and film producer

- Born: 8 September 1958 (age 67); France
- Occupations: Psychoanalyst, writer, filmmaker, film producer
- Known for: Psychiatry, philosophy, filmmaking
- Spouse: Steve Nieve

Muriel Téodori (born September 8, 1958) is a French psychoanalyst, writer, filmmaker and film producer.

== Career ==
Muriel Téodori graduated with degrees in philosophy and clinical psychopathology and went on to teach philosophy.

Developing an interest in film, Téodori collaborated on several screenplays for feature films, including Tom and Lola, The Shadow and The Silences of the Palace, and directed several short films. The first feature film she directed was Sans plomb in 2000, which premiered at the Cabourg Film Festival. Although well received by critics, it was not a commercial success.

In 1992 Téodori taught film-making at La Fémis. She also worked as a journalist for Elle using the pseudonym Jeanne Chuzelles.

In 2007 Téodori wrote the libretto for an opera released by Deutsche Grammophon titled Welcome to the Voice with Steve Nieve, Sting, Robert Wyatt, Elvis Costello and Barbara Bonney as the main performers. The opera received a mixed reception in France but was well received in the United States. Time magazine noted the modernity of the opera and how well it was received.

In 2022, Teodori was invited to the Canneseries Writer's Club held concurrently with Cannes Film Festival to present a masterclass on The unconscious of your TV characters. Others in the Writer's Club series of Masterclasses for 2022: Hwang Dong-hyeok (Writer, Director, Producer), Anthony Horowitz, Ulf Kvensler, Emma Nyberg, Sandrine Brauer, Fabienne Silvestre, Reshef Levi, Cynthia Okoye (Curtis Brown Agency), Roy Ashton (The Gersh Agency), Christian Hodell (Hamilton Hodell Agency), Eric Laroche, Julien Vanlerenberghe, Stéphane Pannetier and Thierry Poiraud (Infiniti).

== Books ==
In 1997 Téodori published a book with philosopher Jacques Dechamps.

- En quel état j'erre, peut-on se connaître soi-même?

For Dior, Moments of Joy, published by Flammarion in 2019, Teodori wrote the text drawing from literature, philosophy, and the House of Dior's own creative history. The book's 220 images were collected from the House of Dior’s Dior Parfums ad campaigns, photographed by Richard Avedon, Henri Cartier-Bresson, Guy Bourdin, Jean-Paul Goude and others). Teodori's background in psychology provides an idiosyncratic look at the emotion and promotion of joy at the core of Dior's fashion and success.

== Filmography ==
Short films include:

- La Princesse sur un autre pois, 1989
- Eux, vous, nous, 1991
- Le Linge sale, 1993

Feature-length films:

- Sans plomb, 2000

Producer credit:

- Le fils de la sorcière, 2004

== Personal life ==
In recent years, Téodori has lived in France with her husband, keyboardist and songwriter Steve Nieve.
