= Mother Schmuckers =

2021 comedy film

- Directed by: Harpo Guit; Lenny Guit
- Written by: Harpo Guit; Lenny Guit
- Produced by: David Borgeaud; Erika Meda
- Starring: Claire Bodson; Maxi Delmelle; Harpo Guit; Yannick Renier; Habib Ben Tanfous; Mathieu Amalric
- Cinematography: Sylvestre Vannoorenberghe
- Edited by: Guillaume Lion
- Distributed by: Best Friend Forever
- Release date: January 30, 2021 (Sundance)
- Running time: 70 minutes
- Country: Belgium
- Language: French

Mother Schmuckers (French: Fils de plouc, lit. 'Son of a slob') is a 2021 Belgian comedy film directed and written by Harpo Guit and Lenny Guit. The film stars Claire Bodson, Maxi Delmelle, Harpo Guit, Yannick Renier, Habib Ben Tanfous, and Mathieu Amalric.

The film had its world premiere at the 2021 Sundance Film Festival on January 30, 2021.

== Plot ==
Issachar & Zabulon, two brothers in their twenties, are supremely stupid and never bored, as madness is part of their daily lives. When they lose their mother’s beloved dog, they have 24 hours to find it – or she will kick them out.

— Variety

== Cast ==
- Maxi Delmelle as Issachar
- Harpo Guit as Zabulon
- Claire Bodson as Cachemire, Issachar and Zabulon's mother
- Yannick Renier as Anthony le flic, a policeman
- Habib Ben Tanfous as Choukri, a wannabe filmmaker friend of the brothers
- Toni d’Antonio as Daniel, Cachemire's stalker
- Chaida Chady Suku Suku as Violeta, Cachemire's pimp
- Mathieu Amalric as Le Père, Issachar and Zabulon's father
- Fresco as Jacques-Janvier, the kidnapped dog.

== Release ==
The film had its premiere at the 2021 Sundance Film Festival on January 30, 2021, in the Midnight section.

== Reception ==
The film received mixed reviews. On Rotten Tomatoes, the film has an approval rating of 52% based on reviews from 29 critics, with an average rating of 5/10. The critics consensus reads: "Very little is off-limits in Mother Schmuckers' gleefully offensive pursuit of provocation -- unfortunately, it often mistakes shock value for genuine laughs."
