= Micha Wald =

Belgian film director and screenwriter

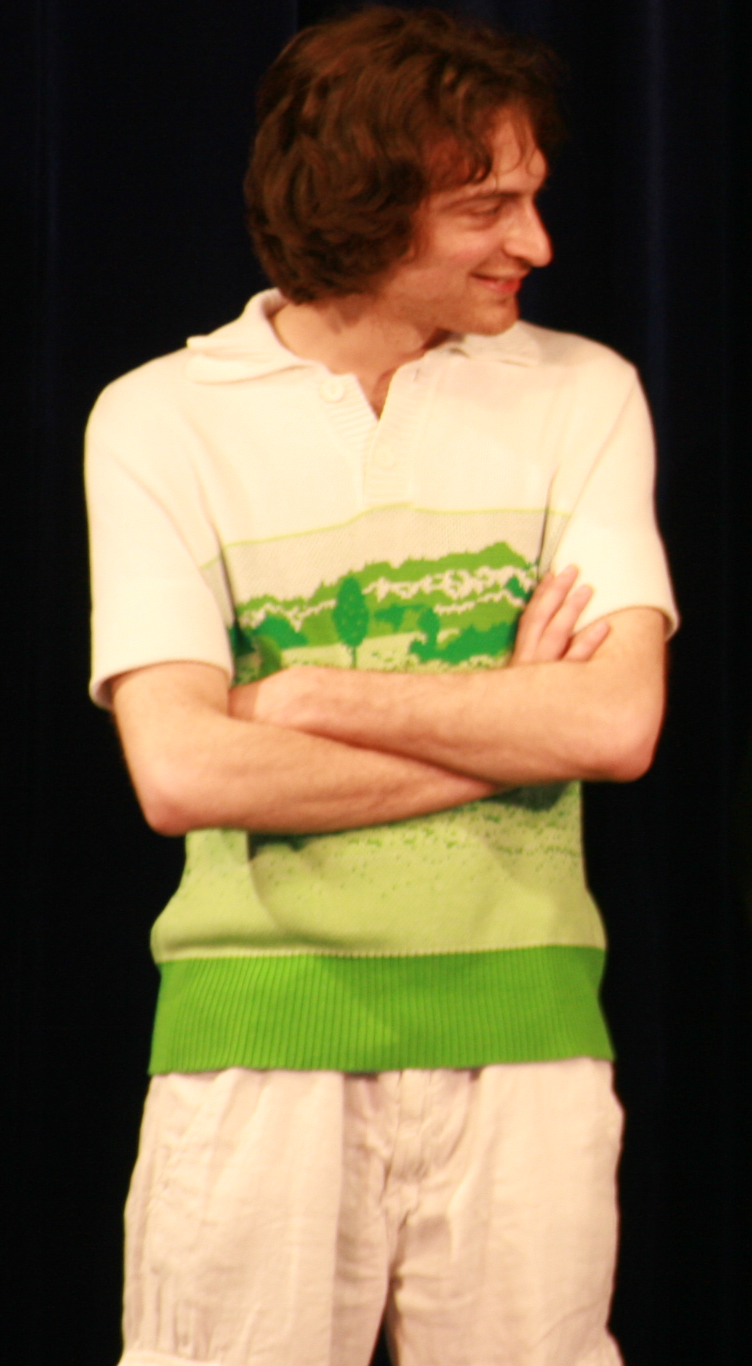
- Micha Wald at Cannes
- Born: 1974 (age 51–52)
- Occupations: film director and screenwriter

Micha Wald (born 1974) is a Belgian film director and screenwriter. His short film Alice and I (2004) received the Joseph Plateau Award for Best Short Film at the 17th Joseph Plateau Awards. Wald made his feature-length debut in 2007 with In the Arms of My Enemy (Voleurs de chevaux), which premiered at the 2007 Cannes Film Festival and earned him a nomination for the Caméra d'Or.

Wald next wrote and directed the film Simon Konianski (2009), starring Jonathan Zaccaï. The film had its world premiere at the 2009 Festival Paris Cinéma.

In 2024 he produced A Survivor's Tale, a dramatization of the story of Marguerite de La Rocque.
