= In the Arms of My Enemy =

In the Arms of My Enemy is a 2007 Belgian film written and directed by Micha Wald.

== Plot ==
The story of the film happens in 1810, somewhere in an Eastern country. Nineteen-year-old Jakub and his eighteen-year-old brother Vladimir have just joined the Cossacks. Jakub is strong and protects Vladimir, who is weaker and quite fragile. Jakub quickly angers and often being locked for punishment. While he is away, Vladimir is being beaten, abused and raped by other boys. After Jakub and Vlad graduate from training, they understand that being a Cossack is quite harsh and terrible. They participate in Cossack raid on a village during which many women and children are killed. They despise murdering behavior and pillaging that Cossacks did and go AWOL.

Elias, 17 and Roman, 30 are two brothers who live in the woods and steal horses. They saw Jakub and Vladimir swimming in the pool, and seizing a moment, steal Jakub and Vladimir's horses. Vladimir and Jakub pursue the thieves and Roman kills Vladimir during confrontation. Jakub is devastated and cannot think about anything but revenge. Determined to avenge the death of his brother, he stalks Roman and Elias in order to get his revenge, finding that he may harm Roman by killing Elias. The events are drawn to a closing dramatic finale.

== Cast ==
- Adrien Jolivet as Jakub
- Grégoire Colin as Roman
- François-René Dupont as Elias
- Grégoire Leprince-Ringuet as Vladimir
- Igor Skreblin as Fentik
- Mylène St-Sauveur as Virina
- Corentin Lobet as Grigori
- Benoît Randaxhe as Maska
- Morgan Marinne as Piotr
- Jacques Urbanska as Lieutenant Mikhail
- Thomas Coumans as Anton
- Thomas Salsmann as Aliosha
- Antonin Salsmann as Andrasz

== Awards ==
Director Micha Wald was nominated for Critics Week Grand Prize and Golden Camera at Cannes Film Festival 2007 as well as for New Voices/New Visions Grand Jury Prize at Palm Springs International Film Festival 2008.
