= Baden Baden (film) =

- Film poster
- Directed by: Rachel Lang
- Written by: Rachel Lang
- Produced by: Jérémy Forni; Joseph Rouschop; Valérie Bournonville; Pierre-Louis Cassou
- Starring: Salomé Richard; Claude Gensac; Swann Arlaud; Zabou Breitman
- Cinematography: Fiona Braillon
- Edited by: Sophie Vercruysse
- Production companies: Tarantula; ChevalDeuxTrois; RTBF
- Distributed by: Jour 2 fête (France)
- Release dates: 28 January 2016 (Angers); 4 May 2016 (France)
- Running time: 94 minutes
- Countries: France; Belgium
- Language: French
- Box office: $61,390

Baden Baden is a 2016 French-Belgian dramedy film written and directed by Rachel Lang.

== Cast ==
- Salomé Richard as Ana
- Claude Gensac as Odette
- Swann Arlaud as Simon
- Zabou Breitman as Chantale
- Olivier Chantreau as Boris
- Lazare Gousseau as Grégoire
- Jorijn Vriesendorp as Mira
- Driss Ramdi as Amar
- Noémie Rosset as Meriem
- Thomas Silberstein as Samson
- Sam Louwyck as Andrew
- Kate Moran as Lois
- Kris Portier de Bellair as Boris's mother
- Régis Lang as Ana's father

== Critical response ==
On review aggregator website Rotten Tomatoes, Baden Baden has an approval rating of 94%, based on 18 reviews, with an average rating of 6.9/10.
