= Lazare Gousseau =

Belgian actress

- Education: Royal Conservatory of Liège
- Occupations: Stage actor; film actor
- Years active: 2004–present

Lazare Gousseau is a Belgian stage and film actor.

After developing an interest in acting, Gousseau enrolled at the Royal Conservatory of Liège and graduated from there in 2004. He later began working in theatre and became a regular performer for Cave Canem Productions in Brussels.

He made his film debut in Baden Baden (2016) that earned him a Jean Carmet Award for Best Supporting Actor. Gousseau rose to prominence with his role in The Experience of Love (2023), a comedy-drama film directed by Ann Sirot and Raphaël Balboni. The latter film earned him a Magritte Award for Most Promising Actor.

== Selected filmography ==
| Year | Title | Role | Notes |
|---|---|---|---|
| 2016 | Baden Baden | Grégoire | Jean Carmet Award for Best Supporting Actor |
| 2023 | The Experience of Love | Rémi | Magritte Award for Most Promising Actor |
| 2024 | Sentimental Value | Laurent | |
