= David Lambert (director) =

Belgian film director and screenwriter

David Lambert (born 1974) is a Belgian film director and screenwriter. He is most noted as cowriter with Guillaume Senez of the 2016 film Keeper, for which they received a Magritte Award nomination for Best Screenplay at the 7th Magritte Awards in 2017.

Lambert co-wrote the screenplays for Senez's short film In Our Blood (Dans nos veines) with Senez and the feature films The Boat Race (La Régate) and Angel at Sea (Un ange à la mer) with Bernard Bellefroid, and wrote and directed the short film Vivre encore un peu..., before releasing Beyond the Walls (Hors les murs) in 2012 as his feature debut. He subsequently directed the films All Yours (Je suis à toi) in 2014, and Third Wedding (Troisièmes noces) in 2018.

His fourth film, Turtles (Les Tortues), premiered in 2023 at the Rencontres du cinéma francophone en Beaujolais. He worked with Jawad Rhalib on the screenplay for Amal (2023) for which he was nominated for the Magritte Award for Best Screenplay.
