= Joachim Lafosse =

Belgian film director and screenwriter (born 1975)

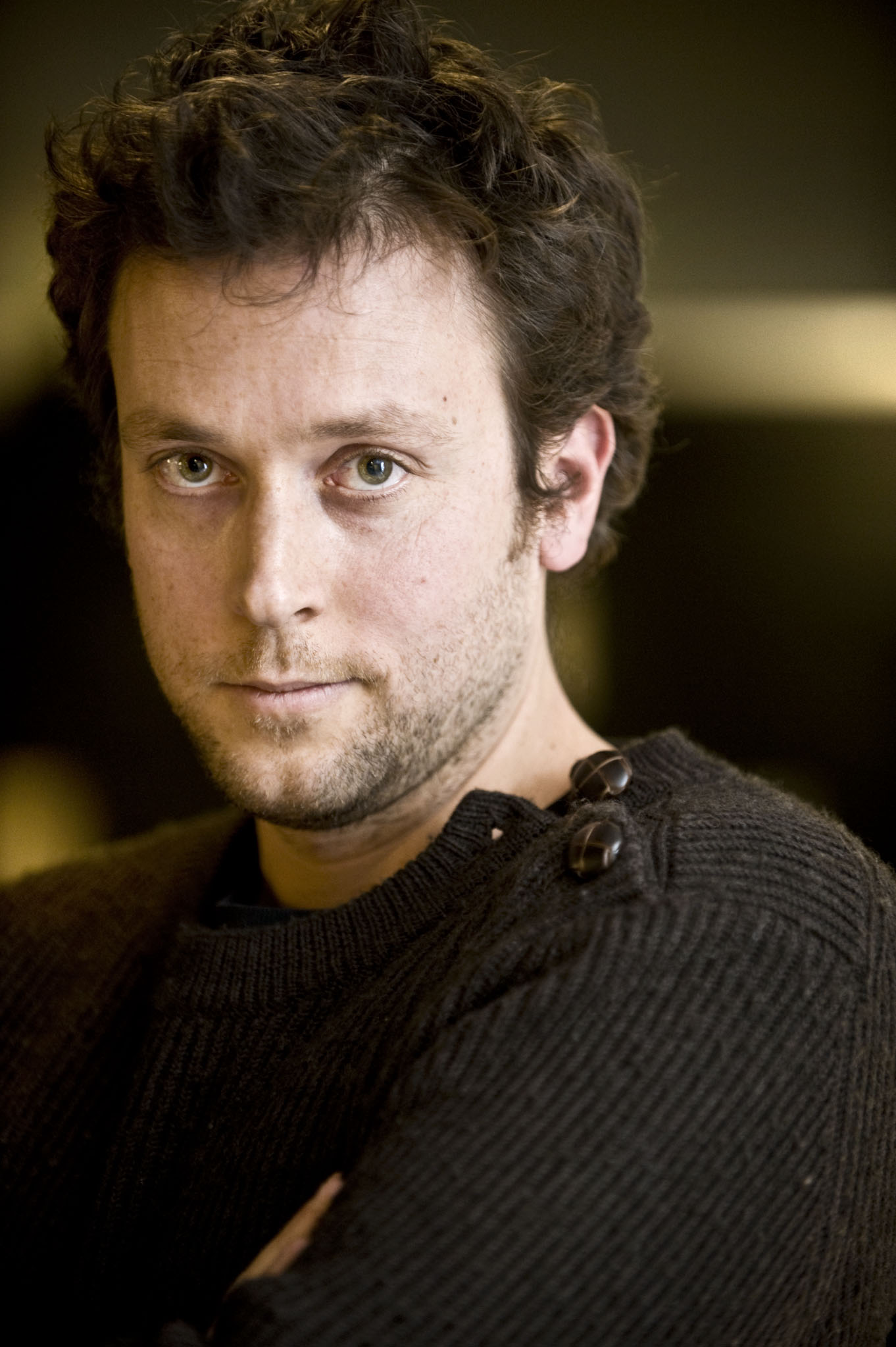
- Joachim Lafosse in December 2010
- Born: 18 January 1975 (age 51); Uccle, Belgium
- Occupations: Film director, screenwriter

Joachim Lafosse (born 18 January 1975) is a Belgian film director and screenwriter.

== Career ==
Lafosse studied at the IAD (Institut des arts de diffusion) at Louvain-la-Neuve between 1997 and 2001. His graduation film Tribu, a 24-minute short, won the best Belgian short subject category at the 2001 Namur Film Festival. His first full-length feature, Folie Privée (2004), won the FIPRESCI award at the Bratislava International Film Festival., and the semi-autobiographical Ça rend heureux (2006) took the Grand Prix at the 2007 Premiers Plans d'Angers festival. 2006 also saw the release of Nue Propriété, starring Isabelle Huppert and brothers Jérémie and Yannick Renier, which debuted at the Venice Film Festival where it was nominated for the Golden Lion and won a SIGNIS award. The film received the André Cavens Award for Best Film by the Belgian Film Critics Association (UCC). For his film Private Lessons (Élève libre), he was nominated for two Magritte Awards in the category of Best Director and Best Screenplay.

His 2012 film Loving Without Reason competed in the Un Certain Regard section at the 2012 Cannes Film Festival. The film was selected as the Belgian entry for the Best Foreign Language Oscar at the 85th Academy Awards, but it did not make the final shortlist. It was nominated for seven Magritte Awards, winning four, including Best Film and Best Director for Lafosse.

In 2023, he presented his new film, Un silence, at the San Sebastian Film Festival. His upcoming project, Six jours ce printemps-là, is scheduled for shooting in the Spring 2024.

In 2025, he won Silver Shell for Best Director at the 73rd San Sebastián International Film Festival on 27 September for his film Six Days in Spring.

== Filmography ==
- 2000: Égoïste Nature (short feature)
- 2000: Tribu (short feature)
- 2001: Scarface (documentary)
- 2004: Folie Privée
- 2006: Ça rend heureux
- 2006: Private Property
- 2008: Private Lessons
- 2012: Our Children (also known as Loving Without Reason)
- 2015: The White Knights
- 2016: After Love
- 2018: Keep Going
- 2021: The Restless
- 2023: A Silence
- 2025: Six Days in Spring
