= Christine Flowers =

American singer and actor (born 1960)

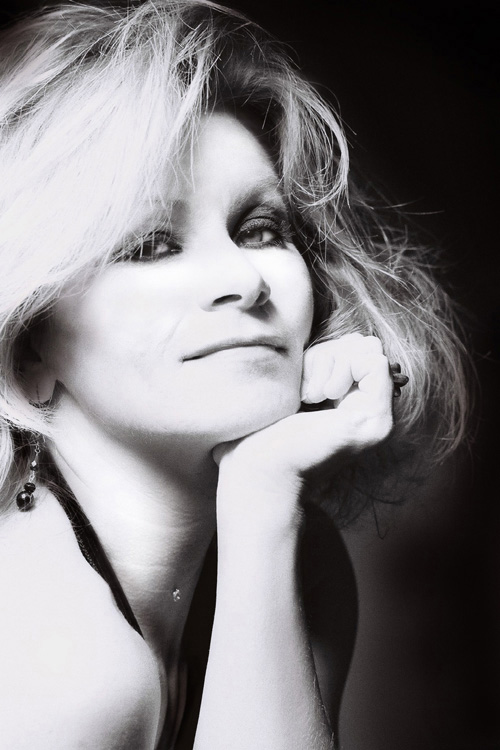
Christine Flowers, 2008

Christine Flowers (born July 1, 1960 in Cape Fear, North Carolina) is an American singer and actress. Her musical repertoire consists of jazz standards.

== Early life ==
Christine Flowers was born in Cape Fear, North Carolina on July 1, 1960. The daughter of Margaret Flowers (née Valentine) an air stewardess for TWA and Shirley Dean Flowers, a captain in the U.S. Airforce. She is of European and Native American descent. Her mother was of Scottish descent and her father half Cherokee. Growing up in the south, Flowers was privy to a deep wealth of musical references. She participated in the Sunday morning services at Big Bethal and Ebenezer Baptist churches in southwest Atlanta, where gospel riveted through her adolescent bones. Her classmates were the children and relatives of the more prolific figures and leaders of the Civil Rights Movement of that era (Martin Luther King Jr., Ralph Abernathy and Hosea Williams). She was also much influenced by the rich R&B and soul scene of the day through her classmates, whose immediate family members where those including Gladys Knight & The Pips and Diahann Carroll. It was with these influences she started her journey with music and at 16 landed her first professional gig in Nashville, Tennessee. She gained her professional experience doing numerous ensemble shows, fronting funk and groove bands and doing studio background vocals for country artists such as Reba McEntire, Tammy Wynette and Charlie Rich.

== Move to Europe ==
Flowers moved to Paris, France, in 1982. She once again started singing in local jazz clubs such as the Hollywood Savoy, Le Petit Journal and Memphis Melody. She then moved to the south of France where she continued performing with local musicians in various festivals, opening for headliners such as John McLaughlin, Dee Dee Bridgewater and Calvin Russell. During this period, she studied music at the I.M.F.P. in Salon de Provence. In 1992, she founded her own band, Christine Flowers Group, and at the same time collaborated with the band, Colors and Light, founded earlier in 1989 by the pianist Francois Quillet (ska Francois Kie). Flowers wrote the lyrics for three songs, composed and produced by Francois Quillet, which has been released on a mini CD in 1994 under the name Colors & Light, in Montpellier, France. The song "Colors and Light" has been rewarded “Winner Clip TV M6 1995”.

== Recent years ==
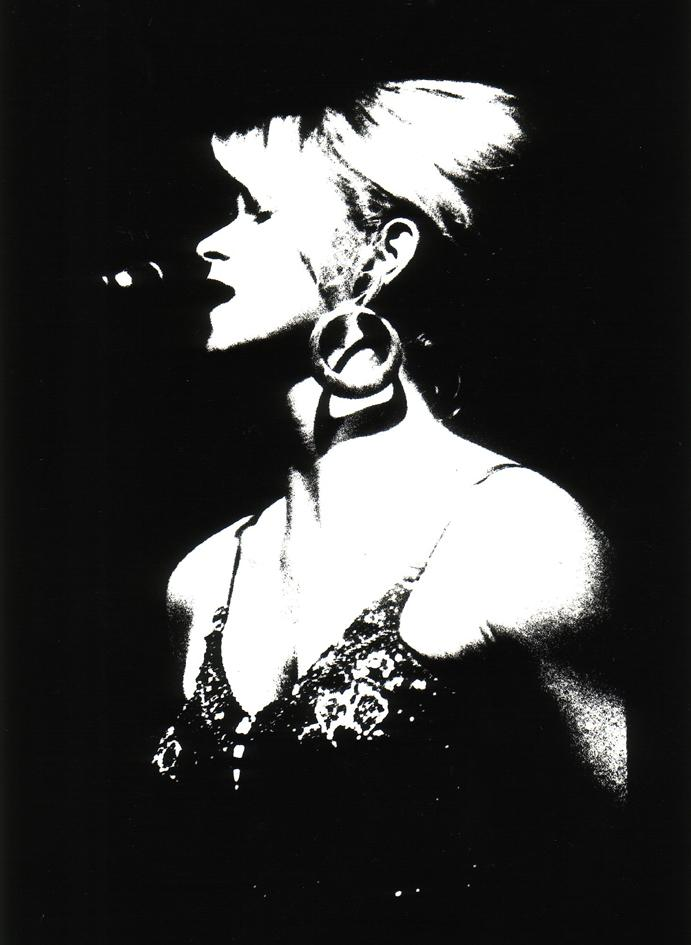
Christine Flowers, 1994

Flowers returned to Paris in the mid-1990s to perform at the Lucky Nugget Saloon at Disneyland Paris where she played the leading role of Miss Diamond Lil. In 1998, she started a career in voice-over and cartoon work. She is the English speaking 'voice' for Air France and SkyTeam and has also taken over Jane Fonda's voice work for the L'Oreàl Age Reperfect Repair campaign in both English and in French. She is the voice of Mimi and Miss Brigitte in Eliot Kid, Sissi in Code Lyoko, Miss Nelly in Cedric and Miss Boumba in Chico Chica Boumba Pepper School.

Parallel to this, she continued singing in Parisian clubs (Sunside Jazz Club, Autour de Midi, Franc Pinot, 7 Lézards, Hot Brass) with her jazz trio composed of Jobic Le Masson, Peter Giron and John Betsch. In 2007, she collaborated on two songs as vocalist by the popular electro jazz/lounge group Sofa Attitiude, for their debut album Urban Love. In 2009, she began recording her second album, In A New Mood... a tribute to Oscar Brown Jr. at Sextan Recording Studio in Paris, France, under the musical direction of Peter Giron.

== Discography ==
=== Studio albums ===
Title	Year	Studio	City
Colors & Light	1994	Studio de la Loge	Montpellier
Urban Love	2007	Sofa Attitude	Paris
In A New Mood	2010	Studio Sextan	Paris

=== Soundtracks ===
Title	Director	Release date
Yes, But...	Yves Lavandier	2001
