= Show, don't tell =

Narrative technique

"Show, don't tell" is a narrative technique used in various kinds of texts to allow the reader to experience the story through actions, words, subtext, thoughts, senses, and feelings rather than through the author's exposition, summarization, and description. It avoids adjectives describing the author's analysis and instead describes the scene in such a way that readers can draw their own conclusions. The technique applies equally to nonfiction and all forms of fiction, literature including haiku and Imagist poetry in particular, speech, movie making, and playwriting.

The concept is often attributed to Russian playwright Anton Chekhov, reputed to have said "Don't tell me the moon is shining; show me the glint of light on broken glass." In a letter to his brother, Chekhov actually said, "In descriptions of Nature one must seize on small details, grouping them so that when the reader closes his eyes he gets a picture. For instance, you’ll have a moonlit night if you write that on the mill dam a piece of glass from a broken bottle glittered like a bright little star, and that the black shadow of a dog or a wolf rolled past like a ball."

By the mid-twentieth century, it had become an important element in Anglophone narratological theory. According to dramatist and author Arthur E. Krows, the American dramatist Mark Swan told Krows about the playwriting motto "Show – not tell" on an occasion during the 1910s. In 1921, the same distinction, but in the form picture-versus-drama, was utilized in a chapter of Percy Lubbock's analysis of fiction, The Craft of Fiction. In 1927, Swan published a playwriting manual that made prominent use of the showing-versus-telling distinction throughout.

== Writers on "show, don't tell" ==
=== Mark Swan ===
The American playwright and scriptwriter Mark Swan (1871-1942) "could talk of little else" than the motto he'd placed on the wall above his writing desk "Show–not tell". Swan elaborated on it in his 1927 primer, You Can Write Plays. Among numerous examples:

"Events that have happened in the past, which cannot possibly be acted in the present, must be 'told about.' The telling of them is the only narrative or description that should be in a play. Make the 'telling' as brief and crisp as possible, without being too obvious. See if the facts can be told in a scene, or scenes, which give the actors a chance for emotional work, thus getting an emotional response from the audience while it is absorbing facts - in other words sugar-coat the pill." [...] "In the planting of characterization, motivation and relationship: don't 'talk it,' ' show it.' Express these things in acted scenes, not in narrative or description."

"The novelist can fire the imagination of the reader with a scene. The dramatist must show the scene. All that the novelist gets by suggestion, by implication, the playwright must get by literal presentation."

=== Percy Lubbock ===
In Chapter VIII of The Craft of Fiction (1921), British essayist Percy Lubbock (1879–1965) wrote:

Picture and drama—this is an antithesis which continually appears in a novel[.... ...]Henry James used them in discussing his own novels, when he reviewed them all in his later years; but I use them, I must add, in a rather more extended sense than he did. [...W]hen the subject of criticism is fiction generally, not his alone, picture will take a wider meaning, as opposed to drama. [...] It is a question, I said, of the reader's relation to the writer; in one case the reader faces towards the story-teller and listens to him, in the other he turns towards the story and watches it. In the drama of the stage, in the acted play, the spectator evidently has no direct concern with the author at all, while the action is proceeding. The author places their parts in the mouths of the players, leaves them to make their own impression, leaves us, the audience, to make what we can of it. The motion of life is before us, the recording, registering mind of the author is eliminated. That is drama; and when we think of the story-teller as opposed to the dramatist, it is obvious that in the full sense of the word there is no such thing as drama in a novel. The novelist may give the very words that were spoken by his characters, the dialogue, but of course he must interpose on his own account to let us know how the people appeared, and where they were, and what they were doing. If he offers nothing but the bare dialogue, he is writing a kind of play; just as a dramatist, amplifying his play with 'stage-directions' and putting it forth to be read in a book, has really written a kind of novel.

=== Ernest Hemingway ===
Nobel Prize–winning novelist Ernest Hemingway was a notable proponent of the "show, don't tell" style. His Iceberg Theory, also known as the "theory of omission", developed from his background as a newspaper reporter. The term itself originates from his 1932 bullfighting treatise, Death in the Afternoon:

If a writer of prose knows enough of what he is writing about he may omit things that he knows and the reader, if the writer is writing truly enough, will have a feeling of those things as strongly as though the writer had stated them. The dignity of movement of an iceberg is due to only one-eighth of it being above water.

Creative literature (as opposed to technical writing or objective journalism) in general hinges on the artful use of a wide range of devices (such as inference, metaphor, understatement, the unreliable narrator, and ambiguity) that reward the careful reader's appreciation of subtext and extrapolation of what the author chooses to leave unsaid, untold, and/or unshown. This suggests a form of respect for the reader, who should be trusted to develop a feeling for the meaning behind the action, without having the point painfully laid out for them.

=== Chuck Palahniuk ===
In a 2013 article, Chuck Palahniuk (author of the novel Fight Club) goes as far as recommending a ban of what he calls "thought verbs" ("Thinks, Knows, Understands, Realizes, Believes, Wants, Remembers, Imagines, Desires […]") favoring instead the use of "specific sensory detail: action, smell, taste, sound, and feeling."

=== James Scott Bell ===
In his book, Exceptions to the Rule, James Scott Bell argues that "show, don't tell" should not be applied to all incidents in a story. "Sometimes a writer tells as a shortcut, to move quickly to the meaty part of the story or scene. Showing is essentially about making scenes vivid. If you try to do it constantly, the parts that are supposed to stand out won't, and your readers will get exhausted." Showing requires more words; telling may cover a greater span of time more concisely. A novel that contains only showing would be incredibly long; therefore, a narrative can contain some legitimate telling.

=== Orson Scott Card ===
Scenes that are important to the story should be dramatized with showing, but sometimes what happens between scenes can be told so the story can make progress. According to Orson Scott Card and others, "showing" is so terribly time-consuming that it is to be used only for dramatic scenes. The objective is to find the right balance of telling versus showing, summarization versus action. Factors like rhythm, pace, and tone come into play.

=== Yves Lavandier ===
In his book Constructing a Story and his webseries Hats Off to the Screenwriters!, Yves Lavandier argues that one can show with dialogue. He takes the example of a scene from Prison Break in which pure dialogue between Michael Scofield (Wentworth Miller) and Tweener (Lane Garrison) shows (and does not tell) that Tweener is an expert pickpocket.

== Tabletop roleplaying ==
The storytelling performed by dungeon masters as well as players in tabletop roleplaying games such as Dungeons & Dragons is based on the concept of "show don't tell". Good dungeon masters convey information by stressing intonation and imagery—they do not merely telegraph it.

== Critical commentary ==
In 2017, Vietnamese-American writer Viet Thanh Nguyen questioned the validity of continuing to teach "show, don't tell" in creative writing classes in a New York Times op-ed on the subject. His position was that such teaching is biased against immigrant writers, who may describe emotions in ways readers from outside their culture might not understand, rendering "tell" necessary.

== See also ==
- Concision
- Diegesis
- Objective correlative
- Purposeful omission
- Verbosity
- Writing style
