= Jurassic War (TV series) =

South Korean animated series

- Genre: Fantasy; Comedy; Adventure
- Based on: Jurassic War 2 by CDV Software and WizardSoft
- Written by: Jo Jeong-hee (조정희); Jeong Se-young (정세영); Hong Jin-seong (홍진성); Kim Hyun-dong (김현동); Jeong Jae-young (정재영)
- Directed by: Lee Ki-young (총감독); Regis Ghezelbash
- Theme music composer: Hwang Jeong-hee (황정희); Ryu Hwi-man (류휘만)
- Opening theme: "Jurassic War" by Kim Moon-seon (김문선) and Ban Mi-hyeon (반미현)
- Composer: Lee Young-bin (설기태)
- Country of origin: South Korea
- Original language: Korean
- No. of seasons: 1
- No. of episodes: 26

Production
- Producer: Park Sang-jun (박상준)
- Running time: 15 min.
- Production companies: RG Prince France; Raon Pictures; WizardSoft; YB Partner

Original release
- Network: MBC
- Release: September 11 – December 4, 2002

Jurassic War, also known as Wars of the Jurassic Period (Korean: 쥬라기 원시전) is a 2002 French-South Korean animated television series based on the 2001 Microsoft Windows game Jurassic War 2, developed by CDV Software and published by WizardSoft. The series was sponsored by RG Prince France and animated by Raon Pictures, and directed by Lee Ki-young and Regis Ghezelbash. It ran for 26 episodes, broadcasting on Munhwa Broadcasting Corporation every Wednesday at 4:30 pm from September 11, 2002 to December 4, 2002 and every Thursday at 4:30 pm from May 28, 2003 to August 20, 2003.

Moonlight and AB Production got the contracts for distribution of the series in U.S. and Canadian markets on television in 2003. It also began airing on Arirang TV and Tooniverse. In 2005, the rights were reserved by Insomnia World Sales. The series was released on DVD in Russia and Ukraine in 2008.

== Plot ==
Long ago, in the mysterious continent of Gonduwa, elves and dinosaurs lived in tribes. One day, the wizard Ferox hears that Terra, the archmage of the Elf tribe, is in critical condition. He uses this as an opportunity to use black magic to brainwash the elves in order to realize his ambition. Thanks to the efforts of the brave chieftain of the Elf tribe, Zilia, her tomboy daughter Niu, and Terra, Ferox's plot fails midway, but the elves fall into a deep sleep due to his curse. The only way to lift the tribe's curse is to find the Papo Spring on the legendary Guria Island, the location of which no one knows. After receiving a map showing the spring's location from Terra, Niu embarks on a long adventure in search of the Papo Spring, accompanied by the clumsy guardian spirit Imp and the silent boy Zar.

Niu visits each dinosaur tribe to obtain sacred elemental relics, representing water, fire, wood, gold (metal), and earth. However, due to constant interference from Ferox and his minions, she ends up losing the sacred relics to him. As a result, all the tribes wage war over the relics to decide Gonduwa's fate. Niu eventually defeats Ferox, finds the Papo Spring, and uses the spring's abilities to bring peace to Gonduwa.

== Characters ==
- Niu (니우; Niu) (voiced by Deok-hee Choi) is the daughter of Zilia, the chieftain of the Elf tribe, who sets out on a journey to find the Papo Spring to save the elves from Pelox's magic. She is quite arrogant and bossy because of her royal blood. Not only is she very prone to sulking and emotional ups and downs, but she is also a light-hearted, cheerful tomboy. She is also so sensitive that her reaction to anything that happens is immediate. She fundamentally has a burning sense of justice, but never has perseverance or calm insight. She has a spiritual connection with nature, allowing her to use her magic, but she goes through a lot of trial and error before she learns to be humble, respect nature and the people around her, and save her tribe.
- Imp (임프; Impeu) (voiced by Seon-ju Lee) is a cowardly and clumsy dinosaur and the guardian spirit of Zilia, who goes with Niu on her journey. He laments his situation of having to follow Niu's orders unconditionally, but in the end, he faithfully does so. He is kind-hearted yet indecisive, which is also an indicator of his mistreatment by Niu. Although he has the ability to transform, he is not in his perfect form, so he gets discouraged every time he does a good deed.
- Zar (자르; Jareu) (voiced by Yoon Sung-hae) is an amnesiac warrior and heir to the Canus tribe who joins Niu on her journey. He was originally a very talkative character, but due to his amnesia, he has become silent, to the point of being mute. He gets along with Imp, and though he secretly likes Niu, his reticence helps him hide his feelings. He shows a genius talent for martial arts using his body and equipment, acting as a bodyguard for Niu and Imp.
- Ferox (페록스; Perokseu) (voiced by Park Ji-hoon) is an elf wizard who tries to brainwash the Elf tribe, but is defeated by Niu, Zelia and Terra and runs away. He then seeks out the Papo Spring with the Demon tribe, aiming to conquer the world. Ferox is cruel and mean-spirited, and constantly harasses Niu, Imp and Zar, but is also stupid enough to sometimes fall for his own tricks. While studying under Terra, due to his innate character, he was unable to learn white magic, so he secretly learned black magic and used it to achieve his ambitions. However, the side effects of his magic made him grow older.
- Deka (데카; Deka) (voiced by An Jang-hyeok) is a burly dinosaur and the chief of the Demon tribe, and the greatest strongman in Gonduwa. After losing the battle against Ferox, he becomes his subordinate and runs to conquer the world, sweating his bare feet, but the results are not always what he wants. He likes Alo, another subordinate of Ferox, and although he is very ignorant, which makes him question how he lived, he surprisingly has a warm heart, as can be seen from his hobby of drawing. He is also a naively ignorant businessman who uses a boomerang as his weapon and tries to solve everything through force.
- Alo (알로; Allo) (voiced by An Jang-hyeok) is a small dinosaur and a subordinate of Ferox. He started working for Ferox at a young age and goes through all the hardships that he has, but is a pitiful being who cannot do this or that because of his magic. Although he is normally small, he turns into a huge dinosaur through a transformation spell. He has fearsome abilities, but always unintentionally causes damage to himself. Due to his eccentric personality, he sometimes comes into conflict with Ferox, but as a result, he leads a turbulent life and later plays an important role when all the tribes face off.

== Voice cast ==
- Deok-hee Choi as Niu
- Kim Ki-hyeon as Terra
- Lee In-seong as Woobula
- Seon-ju Lee as Imp
- An Jang-hyeok as Deka and Alo
- Park Ji-hoon as Ferox
- Yoon Sung-hae as Zar and Zilia

== Episodes ==
Episode	Title	Directed by	Written by	Original release date
1	"Elf Curse (저주에 걸린 엘프족)"	Lee Ki-young (총감독), Regis Ghezelbash	Jo Jeong-hee (조정희), Jeong Se-young (정세영), Hong Jin-seong (홍진성), Kim Hyun-dong (김현동), Jeong Jae-young (정재영)	September 11, 2002
2	"Meet Zar (자르와 만남)"	Lee Ki-young (총감독), Regis Ghezelbash	Jo Jeong-hee (조정희), Jeong Se-young (정세영), Hong Jin-seong (홍진성), Kim Hyun-dong (김현동), Jeong Jae-young (정재영)	September 11, 2002
3	"Weird Woobula (괴짜 영감 우불라)"	Lee Ki-young (총감독), Regis Ghezelbash	Jo Jeong-hee (조정희), Jeong Se-young (정세영), Hong Jin-seong (홍진성), Kim Hyun-dong (김현동), Jeong Jae-young (정재영)	September 18, 2002
4	"Nalph the Coward (겁쟁이 날프)"	Lee Ki-young (총감독), Regis Ghezelbash	Jo Jeong-hee (조정희), Jeong Se-young (정세영), Hong Jin-seong (홍진성), Kim Hyun-dong (김현동), Jeong Jae-young (정재영)	September 18, 2002
5	"Secret of Cave Mountain (동굴산의 비밀)"	Lee Ki-young (총감독), Regis Ghezelbash	Jo Jeong-hee (조정희), Jeong Se-young (정세영), Hong Jin-seong (홍진성), Kim Hyun-dong (김현동), Jeong Jae-young (정재영)	September 25, 2002
6	"Pilfering Dinosaur (소매치기 공룡 쌕쌕이)"	Lee Ki-young (총감독), Regis Ghezelbash	Jo Jeong-hee (조정희), Jeong Se-young (정세영), Hong Jin-seong (홍진성), Kim Hyun-dong (김현동), Jeong Jae-young (정재영)	September 25, 2002
7	"Buragu Lake (부라구 호수)"	Lee Ki-young (총감독), Regis Ghezelbash	Jo Jeong-hee (조정희), Jeong Se-young (정세영), Hong Jin-seong (홍진성), Kim Hyun-dong (김현동), Jeong Jae-young (정재영)	October 2, 2002
8	"Sanctuary of Water (물의 신전)"	Lee Ki-young (총감독), Regis Ghezelbash	Jo Jeong-hee (조정희), Jeong Se-young (정세영), Hong Jin-seong (홍진성), Kim Hyun-dong (김현동), Jeong Jae-young (정재영)	October 2, 2002
9	"Imp Becomes a Mother (엄마가 된 임프)"	Lee Ki-young (총감독), Regis Ghezelbash	Jo Jeong-hee (조정희), Jeong Se-young (정세영), Hong Jin-seong (홍진성), Kim Hyun-dong (김현동), Jeong Jae-young (정재영)	October 9, 2002
10	"Niu's Moment of Crisis (니우 위기의 순간)"	Lee Ki-young (총감독), Regis Ghezelbash	Jo Jeong-hee (조정희), Jeong Se-young (정세영), Hong Jin-seong (홍진성), Kim Hyun-dong (김현동), Jeong Jae-young (정재영)	October 9, 2002
11	"Canus vs. Demon (카누스 대 데몬)"	Lee Ki-young (총감독), Regis Ghezelbash	Jo Jeong-hee (조정희), Jeong Se-young (정세영), Hong Jin-seong (홍진성), Kim Hyun-dong (김현동), Jeong Jae-young (정재영)	October 16, 2002
12	"Imp's Betrayal (임프의 배신)"	Lee Ki-young (총감독), Regis Ghezelbash	Jo Jeong-hee (조정희), Jeong Se-young (정세영), Hong Jin-seong (홍진성), Kim Hyun-dong (김현동), Jeong Jae-young (정재영)	October 16, 2002
13	"Deka's Transformation (데카의 변신)"	Lee Ki-young (총감독), Regis Ghezelbash	Jo Jeong-hee (조정희), Jeong Se-young (정세영), Hong Jin-seong (홍진성), Kim Hyun-dong (김현동), Jeong Jae-young (정재영)	October 23, 2002
14	"Dinosaur Grave (공룡 무덤)"	Lee Ki-young (총감독), Regis Ghezelbash	Jo Jeong-hee (조정희), Jeong Se-young (정세영), Hong Jin-seong (홍진성), Kim Hyun-dong (김현동), Jeong Jae-young (정재영)	October 23, 2002
15	"The Tables Turn (대역전)"	Lee Ki-young (총감독), Regis Ghezelbash	Jo Jeong-hee (조정희), Jeong Se-young (정세영), Hong Jin-seong (홍진성), Kim Hyun-dong (김현동), Jeong Jae-young (정재영)	October 30, 2002
16	"What Happened to Alo (알로에게 생긴 일)"	Lee Ki-young (총감독), Regis Ghezelbash	Jo Jeong-hee (조정희), Jeong Se-young (정세영), Hong Jin-seong (홍진성), Kim Hyun-dong (김현동), Jeong Jae-young (정재영)	October 30, 2002
17	"Battle of Tyranno Valley (티라노 계곡의 전투)"	Lee Ki-young (총감독), Regis Ghezelbash	Jo Jeong-hee (조정희), Jeong Se-young (정세영), Hong Jin-seong (홍진성), Kim Hyun-dong (김현동), Jeong Jae-young (정재영)	November 6, 2002
18	"Fourth Relic (네 번째 신물)"	Lee Ki-young (총감독), Regis Ghezelbash	Jo Jeong-hee (조정희), Jeong Se-young (정세영), Hong Jin-seong (홍진성), Kim Hyun-dong (김현동), Jeong Jae-young (정재영)	November 6, 2002
19	"Memories of Mu-sam-wa-ri (무쌈바니의 추억)"	Lee Ki-young (총감독), Regis Ghezelbash	Jo Jeong-hee (조정희), Jeong Se-young (정세영), Hong Jin-seong (홍진성), Kim Hyun-dong (김현동), Jeong Jae-young (정재영)	November 13, 2002
20	"Center of the Earth (지구의 배꼽)"	Lee Ki-young (총감독), Regis Ghezelbash	Jo Jeong-hee (조정희), Jeong Se-young (정세영), Hong Jin-seong (홍진성), Kim Hyun-dong (김현동), Jeong Jae-young (정재영)	November 13, 2002
21	"Fifth Relic (다섯 번째 신물)"	Lee Ki-young (총감독), Regis Ghezelbash	Jo Jeong-hee (조정희), Jeong Se-young (정세영), Hong Jin-seong (홍진성), Kim Hyun-dong (김현동), Jeong Jae-young (정재영)	November 20, 2002
22	"Stolen Relic (빼앗긴 신물)"	Lee Ki-young (총감독), Regis Ghezelbash	Jo Jeong-hee (조정희), Jeong Se-young (정세영), Hong Jin-seong (홍진성), Kim Hyun-dong (김현동), Jeong Jae-young (정재영)	November 20, 2002
23	"Mystery of Birth (탄생의 신비)"	Lee Ki-young (총감독), Regis Ghezelbash	Jo Jeong-hee (조정희), Jeong Se-young (정세영), Hong Jin-seong (홍진성), Kim Hyun-dong (김현동), Jeong Jae-young (정재영)	November 27, 2002
24	"Battle of Pasura (파수라 해전)"	Lee Ki-young (총감독), Regis Ghezelbash	Jo Jeong-hee (조정희), Jeong Se-young (정세영), Hong Jin-seong (홍진성), Kim Hyun-dong (김현동), Jeong Jae-young (정재영)	November 27, 2002
25	"To Guria Island (구리아 섬으로)"	Lee Ki-young (총감독), Regis Ghezelbash	Jo Jeong-hee (조정희), Jeong Se-young (정세영), Hong Jin-seong (홍진성), Kim Hyun-dong (김현동), Jeong Jae-young (정재영)	December 4, 2002
26	"Mystical Papo Spring (신비한 파포의 샘)"	Lee Ki-young (총감독), Regis Ghezelbash	Jo Jeong-hee (조정희), Jeong Se-young (정세영), Hong Jin-seong (홍진성), Kim Hyun-dong (김현동), Jeong Jae-young (정재영)	December 4, 2002

== Production ==
Jurassic War was loosely based on Jurassic War 2, a 2001 real-time strategy video game for Microsoft Windows set in prehistoric times that includes role-playing game elements, and a sequel to the original game of the same name from 1997. It was the first Korean animation to be based on a video game. The series was produced between 2001 and 2002 with joint efforts of RG Prince France and Raon Pictures, who animated the series, and directed by Lee Ki-young and Regis Ghezelbash. A total of 2.5 billion won was invested between Raon, RG Prince France, WizardSoft, the publisher of Jurassic War 2, and YB Partner, of which WizardSoft invested 12% and RG Prince France invested 25% to sponsor the series and distribute it in Europe, while Raon was working on the production itself.

== Broadcast ==
The series aired on Munhwa Broadcasting Corporation every Wednesday at 4:30 pm from September 11, 2002 to December 4, 2002 and every Thursday at 4:30 pm from May 28, 2003 to August 20, 2003, and received positive reviews upon release. As soon as the third episode was completed, Raon Pictures introduced the series to American distributor Moonlight and AB Production, and received positive feedback. The two companies got the contracts for distribution of the series in U.S. and Canadian markets on television. It was scheduled to begin airing in Canada in the first quarter of 2003 and America in the second quarter of that year, with Moonlight and AB Production planning VHS and DVD releases after the series' broadcast. The series also began airing on Arirang TV and Tooniverse.

== Home video ==
In 2005, Insomnia World Sales had the rights to the series reserved. It was distributed on DVD in three volumes by "Hits for Kids" in Russia as Войны Юрского периода ("Wars of the Jurassic Period") and ИНТЕР-ФИЛЬМ in Ukraine (with Ukrainian subtitles) in 2008. Each volume was sold separately. The menu for choosing an episode featured a 35-second hip hop remix of the series' theme song on loop. (Note: Attributed to multiple references:) The series was also distributed on Video CD in promotional volumes by Dragon AV in Malaysia (with Indonesian subtitles).

== See also ==
- South Korean animation
