= Émilie Dequenne =

Belgian actress (1981–2025)

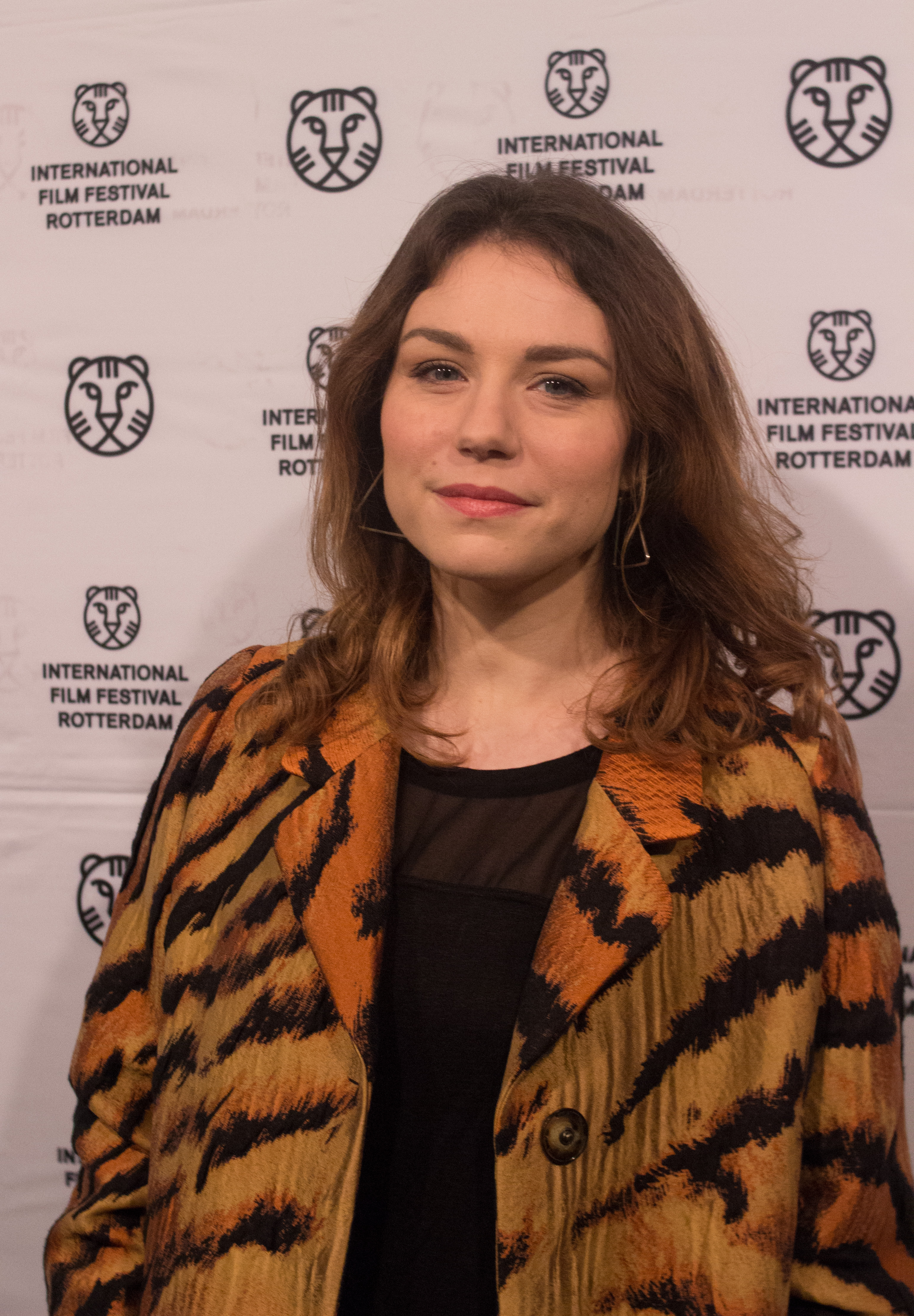
- Dequenne at the 2017 International Film Festival Rotterdam
- Born: 29 August 1981; Belœil, Belgium
- Died: 16 March 2025 (aged 43); Villejuif, France
- Other name: Emilie Dequenne
- Occupation: Actor
- Years active: 1999–2023
- Spouse: Michel Ferracci (m. 2014)
- Partner(s): Alexandre Savarese (1999–2005)
- Children: 1

Émilie Dequenne (French: [emili dəkɛn]; 29 August 1981 – 16 March 2025) was a Belgian actress. She first gained recognition for her role in the Dardenne brothers' film Rosetta (1999), which earned her the Cannes Film Festival Award for Best Actress. The film also won the Palme d'Or at the festival.

Over her career, she appeared in a variety of films, including the period action horror Brotherhood of the Wolf (2001), the drama The Girl on the Train (2009), the psychological drama Our Children (2012), and the drama Love Affair(s) (2020), the latter for which she won the César Award for Best Supporting Actress.

== Career ==
Dequenne was born in Belœil in 1981 and her parents were Brigitte and Daniel. When she was twelve she began to attend the Académie de Musique et des Arts de la Parole in Saint-Ghislain.

Her breakthrough role in Rosetta established her as a notable talent in European cinema. She continued to work in both mainstream and independent films, such as Christophe Gans's Brotherhood of the Wolf, which achieved significant commercial success, and Joachim Lafosse's Our Children, for which she won the Un Certain Regard Award for Best Actress at the 2012 Cannes Film Festival. She also received the Magritte Award for Best Actress and a Satellite Award nomination for her performance in the film.

Other notable films in her career include The Light (2004), the horror film The Pack (2010), the romantic comedy Not My Type (2014), and the drama This Is Our Land (2017).

== Personal life and death ==
Dequenne had a daughter, Milla Savarese (b. 2002), with her partner, Belgian DJ Alexandre Savarese. The two were together from 1999 to 2005. In 2008, she met actor Michel Ferracci, whom she would marry in 2014.

She died at the Gustave-Roussy Hospital in Villejuif, France, on 16 March 2025, after being diagnosed with adrenocortical carcinoma. She was 43.

== Filmography ==
| Year | Title | Role | Director | Notes |
|---|---|---|---|---|
| 1999 | Rosetta | Rosetta | Dardenne brothers | Cannes Film Festival Award for Best Actress; Chicago Film Critics Association Award for Most Promising Actress; Joseph Plateau Award for Best Belgian Actress; Nominated - César Award for Most Promising Actress; Nominated - European Film Award for Best Actress |
| 2001 | Brotherhood of the Wolf | Marianne de Morangias | Christophe Gans | Cabourg Romantic Film Festival - Best New Actress |
| 2001 | Yes, But... | Eglantine Laville | Yves Lavandier | Avanca Film Festival - Best Acting |
| 2002 | Une femme de ménage | Laura | Claude Berri | Nominated - César Award for Most Promising Actress |
| 2002 | Jean Moulin | Lili | Yves Boisset | TV movie |
| 2003 | The Very Merry Widows | Laurence Milcaux | Catherine Corsini | Nominated - Joseph Plateau Award for Best Belgian Actress |
| 2004 | The Light | Brigitte | Philippe Lioret | Nominated - César Award for Best Supporting Actress |
| 2004 | The Bridge of San Luis Rey | Doña Clara | Mary McGuckian | |
| 2004 | L'américain | Nelly | Patrick Timsit | |
| 2004 | Kaamelott | Edern | Alexandre Astier | TV series (1 Episode) |
| 2005 | The United States of Albert (Les États-Unis d'Albert) | Grace Carson | André Forcier | |
| 2005 | Avant qu'il ne soit trop tard | Aurélia | Laurent Dussaux | |
| 2005 | La ravisseuse | Charlotte | Antoine Santana | |
| 2006 | Le Grand Meaulnes | Valentine | Jean-Daniel Verhaeghe | |
| 2006 | Écoute le temps | Charlotte | Alantė Kavaitė | |
| 2006 | Du rouge sur la croix | Cécile Thuillier | Dominique Othenin-Girard | TV movie |
| 2007 | To Each His Own Cinema | The crying woman | Dardenne brothers (2) | |
| 2007 | La Vie d'artiste | Cora | Marc Fitoussi | |
| 2007 | Confidences | | Laurent Dussaux (2) | TV Mini-Series |
| 2008 | Rien dans les poches | Judith Miro | Marion Vernoux | TV movie |
| 2008 | Charlotte Corday | Charlotte Corday | Henri Helman | TV movie |
| 2008 | Miroir, mon beau miroir | Marion | Serge Meynard | TV movie |
| 2009 | The Girl on the Train | Jeanne Fabre | André Téchiné | Taormina International Film Festival - Best Acting Performance |
| 2009 | J'ai oublié de te dire | Marie | Laurent Vinas-Raymond | |
| 2009 | Obsession(s) | Sarah Lisbourne | Frédéric Tellier | TV movie |
| 2010 | The Pack | Charlotte Massot | Franck Richard | New York City Horror Film Festival - Best Actress |
| 2011 | Mystère au Moulin Rouge | Diane Barraud | Stéphane Kappes | TV movie |
| 2012 | Our Children | Murielle | Joachim Lafosse | Cannes Film Festival - Un Certain Regard - Best Actress; Magritte Award for Best Actress; Palm Springs International Film Festival - Best Actress; Nominated - European Film Award for Best Actress; Nominated - Dublin Film Critics' Circle - Best Actress; Nominated - Globes de Cristal Award for Best Actress; Nominated - Satellite Award for Best Actress – Motion Picture |
| 2012 | La traversée | Sarah Arendt | Jérôme Cornuau | |
| 2013 | Möbius | Sandra | Éric Rochant | |
| 2014 | Not My Type | Jennifer | Lucas Belvaux | Magritte Award for Best Actress; Cabourg Romantic Film Festival - Best Actress; Nominated - César Award for Best Actress; Nominated - Globes de Cristal Award for Best Actress; Nominated - Lumière Award for Best Actress; Nominated - Trophees Francophones du Cinema - Best Actress |
| 2014 | Divin Enfant | Sarah | Olivier Doran | |
| 2014 | The Missing | Laurence Relaud | Tom Shankland | TV series (8 Episodes) |
| 2015 | Par accident | Angélique | Camille Fontaine | |
| 2015 | Souviens-toi | Emilie Auclair | Philippe Venault | TV movie |
| 2016 | Trainee Day | Cyrielle | Marc Fitoussi (2) | |
| 2016 | Accusé | | | TV series (1 Episode) |
| 2017 | See You Up There | Madeleine Péricourt | Albert Dupontel | |
| 2017 | Les Hommes du feu | Bénédicte | Pierre Jolivet | |
| 2017 | This Is Our Land | Pauline Duhez | Lucas Belvaux (2) | Magritte Award for Best Actress |
| 2020 | Love Affair(s) | Louise | Emmanuel Mouret | César Award for Best Supporting Actress; Nominated - Magritte Award for Best Supporting Actress |
| 2022 | Close | Sophie | Lukas Dhont | |
| 2023 | Année Zéro | Juliette Kharoub | Olivier Barma | TV series (4 episodes) |
| 2023 | Mr. Blake at Your Service! | Odile | Gilles Legardinier | |
| 2024 | Colocs de choc | la neurologue | Élodie Lélu | |
| 2024 | Survivre | Julia | Frédéric Jardin | |
| 2024 | TKT | Meredith | Solange Cicurel | Dequenne's last film appearance |

== Awards and nominations ==
| Year | Association | Category | Work | Result | Citations |
|---|---|---|---|---|---|
| 1999 | Cannes Film Festival | Best Actress | Rosetta | Won | |
| 1999 | European Film Awards | European Actress | Rosetta | Nominated | |
| 2000 | César Awards | Most Promising Actress | Rosetta | Nominated | |
| 2000 | Chicago Film Critics Association Awards | Most Promising Actress | Rosetta | Won | |
| 2000 | Joseph Plateau Awards | Best Belgian Actress | Rosetta | Won | |
| 2001 | Cabourg Romantic Film Festival | Best new actress | Brotherhood of the Wolf | Won | |
| 2002 | Avanca Film Festival | Best acting | Oui, mais... | Won | |
| 2003 | César Awards | Most Promising Actress | Une femme de ménage | Nominated | |
| 2004 | Joseph Plateau Awards | Best Belgian Actress | Mariées mais pas trop | Nominated | |
| 2005 | César Awards | Best Supporting Actress | The Light | Nominated | |
| 2009 | Taormina Film Fest | Best Acting Performance | The Girl on the Train | Won | |
| 2010 | New York City Horror Film Festival | Best Actress | La Meute | Won | |
| 2012 | Cannes Film Festival | Best Actress | Our Children | Won | |
| 2012 | European Film Awards | European Actress | Our Children | Nominated | |
| 2012 | Satellite Awards | Best Actress in a Motion Picture | Our Children | Nominated | |
| 2013 | Palm Springs International Film Festival | Best Actress | Our Children | Won | |
| 2013 | Magritte Awards | Best Actress | Our Children | Won | |
| 2013 | Dublin Film Critics Circle Awards | Best Actress | Our Children | Nominated | |
| 2013 | Globes de Cristal Awards | Best Actress | Our Children | Nominated | |
| 2013 | Trophees Francophones du Cinema | Best Actress | Our Children | Nominated | |
| 2014 | Cabourg Romantic Film Festival | Best Actress | Pas son genre | Won | |
| 2015 | César Awards | Best Actress | Pas son genre | Nominated | |
| 2015 | Magritte Awards | Best Actress | Pas son genre | Won | |
| 2015 | Globes de Cristal Awards | Best Actress | Pas son genre | Nominated | |
| 2015 | Trophees Francophones du Cinema | Best Actress | Pas son genre | Nominated | |
| 2015 | Lumière Awards | Best Actress | Pas son genre | Nominated | |
| 2018 | Magritte Awards | Best Actress | This Is Our Land | Won | |
| 2021 | César Awards | Best Supporting Actress | Love Affair(s) | Won | |
| 2022 | Magritte Awards | Best Supporting Actress | Love Affair(s) | Nominated | |
| 2023 | Magritte Awards | Best Supporting Actress | Close | Won | |
| 2023 | Ostend Film Festival | Best Supporting Performance | Close | Nominated | |
| 2024 | CinEuphoria Awards | Best Ensemble | Close | Nominated | |
| 2024 | CinEuphoria Awards | Best Supporting Actress | Close | Nominated | |

== Theater ==
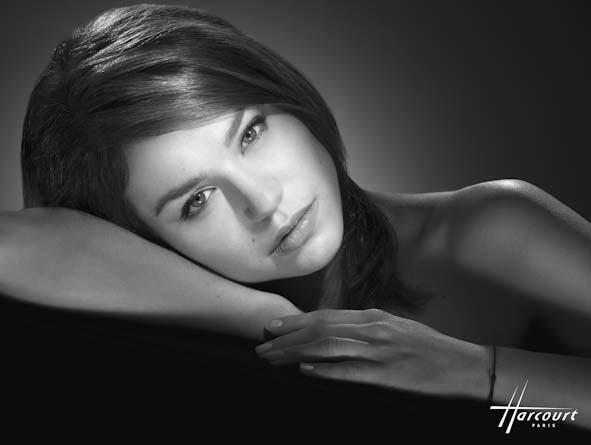
Dequenne in 2009

| Year | Title | Author | Director |
|---|---|---|---|
| 2003 | Lysistrata | Aristophanes | Natacha Gerritsen |
| 2006 | Miss Julie | August Strindberg | Didier Long |
| 2010 | Mon Tibet | Michel Lengliney | Didier Long (2) |
