= The God of High School =

2011–2022 South Korean webtoon

- First volume cover, featuring Jin Mori

갓 오브 하이스쿨 RR: Gat obeu haiseukul MR: Kat obŭ haisŭk'ul
- Genre: Comedy, martial arts, supernatural
- Author: Yongje Park
- Publisher: Imageframe
- Webtoon service: Naver Webtoon (Korean); Line Webtoon (English)
- Country of origin: South Korea
- Original run: April 8, 2011 – November 3, 2022
- Volumes: 4
- Light novel

The God of High School:Eclipse
- Written by: Bloody
- Illustrated by: Park Yongje
- Published by: Naver Novels
- Original run: April 2, 2015 – July 28, 2016
- Volumes: 2
- Video game
- Developer: YD Online
- Directed by: Choi Seok-Ho
- Produced by: Kim Dong-Gyun
- Genre: MMORPG School Battle
- Engine: Smartphone
- Platform: Android; iOS
- Released: May 21, 2015
- Video game

G.O.H. – The God of High School
- Developer: SN Games
- Genre: MMORPG Fighting
- Engine: Smartphone
- Platform: Android; iOS
- Released: July 19, 2016
- Anime television series
- Directed by: Sunghoo Park (Note: Credited spelling, also known as Seong Ho Park.)
- Produced by: Saeho Song; Joseph Chou
- Written by: Kiyoko Yoshimura
- Music by: Alisa Okehazama
- Studio: MAPPA
- Licensed by: Crunchyroll; NA: Viz Media (home video); UK: Anime Limited (home video); SA/SEA: Muse Communication
- Original network: Tokyo MX, AT-X
- Country of origin: Japan
- Original run: July 6, 2020 – September 28, 2020
- Episodes: 13

The God of High School (Korean: 갓 오브 하이스쿨) is a South Korean manhwa released as a webtoon written and illustrated by Yongje Park. It has been serialized in Naver Corporation's webtoon platform Naver Webtoon from April 2011 to December 2022, with the individual chapters collected and published by Imageframe under their Root label into four volumes as of January 2023. The God of High School received official English translations by Line Webtoon beginning in July 2014.

It has received a mobile game and an original net animation (ONA) short attached to the aforementioned game's original soundtrack. An anime television series adaptation produced by MAPPA aired from July to September 2020.

== Synopsis ==
=== Setting ===
In GOH, the action takes place and involves the inhabitants of three different realms:

The Human Realm is mainly populated by humans and is identical to the real world. It is the least powerful realm followed by the Sage Realm and then the Heavenly Realm at the highest.
The Sage Realm (동승신주; 신선계; 仙界; lit. 'World of the immortal/sage'), also known as the Demon Realm, Taoist World, or Other World. It is populated by various mythical creatures, spirits, and monsters (collectively known as demons) such as Dragons, Minotaurs, and Phoenixes.
The Heavenly Realm (신계; 神界; lit. 'Divine World') is the last realm and the most powerful. The Heavenly Realm is home to many powerful gods of various mythologies and legends like the Jade Emperor, Michael the Archangel, and Hercules.

At the dawn of time, humans, demons and gods lived together on Earth. The gods allowed the weak humans to borrow their powers, creating the "Borrowed Power" system (or "Charyeok" in Korean) so they could defend themselves from the demons who wanted to rule over them. Shortly after the demon defeat, the gods split up the humans, demons and gods among the three Realms. Humans are since able to use Borrowed Power freely but are not allowed to attack gods with it.

=== Plot ===
The main protagonist is Mori Jin, a 17-year-old martial artist from Seoul, South Korea. At the beginning of the story, he is invited to join a Martial Arts tournament called "The God of High School" (or GOH). The event, sponsored by a shady corporation, brings together people from high schools all over South Korea on a regional and then, national level in order to select three representatives for the World Tournament. As a prize, the winner gets his wish fulfilled by the hosting corporation, no question asked.

This intrigues Mori, and as he continues through the tournament, he meets many competitors each with a different way of fighting. Martial arts aside, participants fight by using "Borrowed Power", a mystical energy granted by supernatural entities (gods, demons, mythical creatures....), hence the name Borrowed Power. During the opening rounds, he comes across two other martial arts prodigies: Full-Contact Karate expert Daewi Han and epeeist master Mira Yoo. These two would befriend Mori after their fights with him, and will become teamed together as the Korean Team after the preliminary rounds. As the tournaments preliminary rounds finish, and teams assemble, plans for many different people within the organization, and those pitted against them begin to make their moves to achieve their goals.

== Characters ==
Mori Jin (Korean: 진모리; RR: Jin Mori); (Japanese: ジン・モリ, Jin Mori (anime))

Voiced by: Tatsumaru Tachibana, Hana Sato (Young) (Japanese); Nam Doh-Hyeong, Kim Bo-Na (Young) (Korean); Robbie Daymond (English)
A happy-go-lucky 17-year-old martial artist from Seoul, South Korea who practices a fictional version of the Korean martial art Taekwondo called Renewal Taekwondo (리뉴얼 태권도) later shortened to Re-Taekwondo. Carefree, friendly and (rightfully so) self-proclaimed "Tough guy" (쎈놈), Mori participates to the GOH tournament so that he can fight strong opponents and wish to be reunited with his grandfather Taejin. Later in the series, after the mystical "Borrowed Power" is introduced Mori is labeled as a Genuine Fighter meaning he uses martial arts to fight rather than borrowing power from other beings (one chapter shows that he actually borrowed power from his clone). However, the reason Mori is so powerful is due to his true identity of the mythical Jaechondaesong, or Sun Wukong, the hero of the Chinese Novel Journey to the West.
After RagnarÖk, he assumes a new form and name via Dan Mori as a result of Park Mujin killing his grandfather and sealing his powers.

Daewi Han (Korean: 한대위; RR: Han Daewi); (Japanese: ハン・デイ, Han Dei (anime))

Voiced by: Kentarō Kumagai (Japanese); Kwak Yoon-Sang (Korean); Sean Chiplock (English)
A 17-year-old martial artist from Seoul, South Korea who practices Full-Contact Karate. Daewi starts off the series as a hard-working young man who works to pay off his best friend's hospital bill due to terminal cancer. After being invited to the GOH tournament, he participates to cure his friend of the disease. After his friend's death, Daewi finds a new purpose in his life through his friendship with Mori and Mira and now wants to help them fulfill their dreams. A tall, lazy-looking young man with a loner personality, he is nonetheless fiercely loyal to his friends and willing to go to great lengths to protect them. His Borrowed Power is that of a Haetae, a Korean mythical creature with the ability to control water as a defensive tool or a weapon as well as augmenting attacks.
After RagnarÖk, he has the Wisdom of the Sage, which allows him to manipulate gravity, electromagnetism, and even nature itself. He also becomes one of The Six.

Mira Yoo (Korean: 유미라; RR: Yu Mira); (Japanese: ユ・ミラ, Yu Mira (anime))

Voiced by: Ayaka Ōhashi (Japanese); Song Ha-Rim (Korean); Veronica Taylor (English)
A 17-year-old swordswoman from Seoul, South Korea and the 25th master of a fictitious sword style called the Moonlight Sword, (월강도) which emphasizes strong yet fluid attacks. She initially joins the GOH Tournament in order to fulfill her wish of finding a suitable husband to carry on the school bloodline. Thanks to her friends Mori and Daewi, Mira let go of her family burden and will make a new path for herself. Mira's borrowed power is of an Ancient Chinese general named Lü Bu, which is loosely based on the historical figure of the same name. This power gives her several abilities such as enhanced strength and the ability to summon a red horse (based on Red Hare, the legendary steed of Lü Bu).
After RagnarÖk, she becomes one of The Six and leader of Neo Nox, a merger of National Assembly of the Homeless and Sang Man-Duk's faction of Nox. She also gains some abilities of Han Daewi via Fundamental Force Manipulation.

Ilpyo Park (Korean: 박일표; RR: Bak Ilpyo); (Japanese: パク・イルピョ, Paku Irupyo (anime))

Voiced by: Koki Uchiyama (Japanese); Kim Ji-Yeul (Korean), Griffin Puatu (English)
One of the main supporting characters in the series. Ilpyo is an 18-year-old boy competing in the God of High School tournament. He is introduced as a logical and calculating fighter who uses a fictional version of the traditional Korean martial art of Taekkyon (태껸) called Ssamsu-Taekkyon (쌈수택견). Ilpyo joined the tournament in order to wish for the recovery of his cousin, crippled during a martial arts competition against Taek Jegal. He later acts as an ally to Mori and helps him through many hardships in the series. His Charyeok is Hojosa, the nine-tail fox of Eastern Asian folklore.

Seungchul Baek (Korean: 백승철; RR: Baek Seungcheol); (Japanese: ペク・スンチョル, Peku Sunchoru (anime))

Voiced by: Yūya Uchida (Japanese); Kim Dong-Ha (Korean), Kyle McCarley (English)
An 18-year-old participant in the God of High School tournament who uses a metal baseball bat as a weapon. Seungchul is of genius-level intellect and peak physical conditioning. This makes his fighting style unorthodox and unpredictable for those he is fighting.

Manseok Gang (Korean: 강만석; RR: Gang Manseok); (Japanese: カン・マンソク Kan Mansoku (anime))

Voiced by: Tomokazu Sugita (Japanese); An Jang-Hyeok (Korean)
A 19-year old participant in the God of High School tournament for the metropolitan region who uses ITF Taekwondo to slaughter his opponents. Manseok is a violent street thug with a sadistic streak who has to be restrained by wearing straitjacket and heavy pants. During his match with Gamdo Go whom he tortures mercilessly, Mori intervenes and knocks Manseok out cold.

Gamdo Go (Korean: 고감도; RR: Go Gamdo); (Japanese: コ・カンド, Ko Kando (anime))

Voiced by: Hiroyuki Yoshino (Japanese); Lee Dong-Hun (Korean)
A skilled practitioner of Tai Chi Chuan with a polite and composed demeanor. After promising debuts during the preliminaries of the tournament, he is pitted against Gang Manseok who proceed to beat him to a pulp and would have maimed him without the intervention of Mori. Gamdo quits the tournament after that. His role in the story substantially decrease, though he is briefly seen in later arcs mastering traditional medicine and helping the protagonists.

Taek Jegal (Korean: 제갈택; RR: Jegal Taek); (Japanese: ジェガル・テク Jegaru Teku (anime))

Voiced by: Kenjiro Tsuda (Japanese); Ha Seong-Yong (Korean), Kaiji Tang (English)
Main antagonist of the first and second arcs. Sold off as a baby by his mother to become the heir of the chairman of a large company, he grew up with a "Might is right" philosophy. Dubbed a monster by his opponents and teammates alike, Taek has an arrogant personality and extremely violent style of fighting, viewing everyone around him as insignificant trash. The only exception being the guardian of Ssamsu-Taekkyon, Ilpyo, his mortal enemy and the only person to defeat him years prior to the GOH tournament. Taek's Charyeok is characterized by "Greed", allowing him to absorb other fighter's powers.

Taejin Jin (Korean: 진태진; RR: Jin Taejin); (Japanese: ジン・テジン, Jin Tejin (anime))

Voiced by: Kazuhiro Yamaji (Japanese); Min Eung-Shik (Korean), Michael Sorich (English)
The adoptive grandfather of protagonist Mori. Probably the strongest Genuine Fighter of the series, Taejin is powerful enough to easily defeat gods by using his sole martial skills. His disdain for Borrowed Power and unlimited potential threaten the status quo between gods and humans and have made him the target of many secret organizations. He is the creator and only master of the fictional Renewal Taekwondo, whom he taught Mori. His disappearance serves as the main motivation for Mori to join the GOH tournament.

Mujin Park (Korean: 박무진; RR: Bak Mujin); (Japanese: パク・ムジン, Paku Mujin (anime))

Voiced by: Daisuke Namikawa (Japanese); Ryu Seung-Gon (Korean), Edward Bosco (English)
Main antagonist of the manhwa. Member of the National Assembly of Korea, he is the figure in charge of the God of High School tournament. In the series, Mujin acts as a mastermind by laying out plans to achieve his goal of obtaining power in order to create a new world. Considered a prodigy and destined for greatness from a very young age, the best shaman in Korea even told him that he would become "a king who will revolutionize the world", setting the history of God Of High School into motion. His Borrowed Power is called "Longinus" which manifests as two yellow crosses appearing on each of Mujin's hands. The name Longinus is loosely based on the Roman soldier said to have pierced the side of Jesus during the Crucifixion. Longinus allows Mujin control over gravity and as a defensive shield. He commands a group of powerful humans specialized in Charyeok called commissioners or executives (Kor: 집행위원). These figures are responsible for recruiting contestants and running the God of Highschool Tournament.

Commissioner O (Korean: 집행위원 O; RR: Jiphaengwiwon O); (Japanese: 審判員O, Shinpan-in O (anime))

Voiced by: Yuki Kaida (Japanese); Kim Hyun-Wook (Korean); Lucien Dodge (English)
Member of the judges. Slightly shorter than the other executives, he has white, shoulder-length hair and dark-colored skin. O has won the first G.O.H tournament and, as such, is regarded by his colleagues as the strongest judge. His calm and perky character often makes him act as a mediator between the irritable R and the rash Q, often at each other's throat. He wields the Charyeok "Dragon slayer" which enables him to summon and command dragons as well as controlling fire. O is the one who recruited Mira for the G.O.H Tournament and appears fearful of the young woman, always avoiding eye contact with her and calling her "a monster". His true name is Sochun Yang.

Commissioner P (Korean: 집행위원 P; RR: Jiphaengwiwon P); (Japanese: 審判員P, Shinpan-in P (anime))

Voiced by: Asami Tano (Japanese); Lee Mi-Na (Korean), Erika Harlacher (English)
Only female member of the judges, she acts as Mujin's personal secretary, almost never leaving his side. P is a serious, dutiful and professional executive as well as caring of her colleagues. She is a tall, slim woman, wearing a female version of the Judge's uniform with blue hair tied in a bun. P uses the Charyeok "Marionette" to create "dolls" or copies of other people and be connected to them thus knowing and seeing what they know and see.

Commissioner Q (Korean: 집행위원 Q; RR: Jiphaengwiwon Q); (Japanese: 審判員Q, Shinpan-in Q (anime))

Voiced by: Kenji Hamada (Japanese); Lee In-Suk (Korean); Xander Mobus (English)
Member of the judges. Recognizable by his tall stature, green hair and square glass. Q has a laid back if unorganized way of living his life, yet harbors an arrogant and act-before-thinking temper which often put him at odd with his boss and fellow commissioners. A running gag in the series is that whenever Q fights, his salary lessens. His Charyeok is "Joker", a scythe wielding jester-like entity he can summon with cards. Q recruited Daewi for the tournament and even trained him later on. He eventually married his student's older sister Daeryeong, with whom he has three kids.

Commissioner R (Korean: 집행위원 R; RR: Jiphaengwiwon R); (Japanese: 審判員R, Shinpan-in R (anime))

Voiced by: Chikahiro Kobayashi (Japanese); Lee Jae-Beom (Korean), Lucien Dodge (English)
Member of the judges. R is a tall, slender man and wears the typical Judge uniform. He has straight blonde hair going down his neck with narrow eyes that are often seen closed. Calm and collected, R is, like the other executives, proud of his strength. This makes him appear annoyed or vindictive when he is bested or doesn't get his way. R's Charyeok is unnamed and very unusual, as it enables him to forcibly take power from gods without their consent and control the wind. He was the one to recruit Mori for the tournament, inflicting the high-schooler his first defeat ever.

Announcer/Commissioner T (Korean: 집행위원 T; RR: Jiphaengwiwon T); (Japanese: 実況T, Jikkyō T (anime))

Voiced by: Tomokazu Seki (Japanese); Hwang Chang-Young (Korean), Edward Bosco (English)
Member of the judge and the announcer of the GOH tournament. He has black spiky hair and orange sunglasses. Being himself blind, T also goes by the nickname Bongsa Sim, probably based on a blind character of a famous Korean Pansori story: Simcheongga. He has a long and pointed nose with shark-like teeth. Being a very skilled swordsman, T provides some advice to Mira for the tournament, even revealing he owes his blindness to an encounter with Mira's own family's sword style, Moonlight Sword. His true name is Jeongso Sim.

== Development ==
Author Park Yong-Je majored in cartoon animation at Sunchon National University. Inspired by action genre and Dragon Ball, Park made his debut with "Tough Guy" (쎈놈), published on Naver Webtoon from 2008 to 2009. This manhwa, set around high-school brawlers from Park's hometown of Suncheon, was well received and inspired him to pursue a "100% totally unrealistic work of action" where high schoolers from all over the world would compete to become the God of High School.

== Media ==
=== Manhwa ===
Yongje Park launched The God of High School in Naver's webtoon platform Naver Webtoon on April 8, 2011. Its first collected volume was published by Imageframe under their Root label on January 31, 2017. The God of High School was one of the first webtoons to receive official English translations by LINE Webtoon in July 2014.

==== Volumes ====
No.	Korean release date	Korean ISBN
1	January 31, 2017	978-8-96-052321-0
2	September 24, 2020	979-1-16-085824-2
3	February 25, 2021	979-1-19-122543-3
4	January 15, 2023	979-1-16-769205-4

=== Novel ===
A spin-off light novel of the webtoon, The God of High School:Eclipse, which was written by Bloody and illustrated by Park Yongje, was launched on Naver's web novel platform Naver Novel, and ran from April 2, 2015, to July 28, 2016.

=== Game ===
On August 14, 2014, YD Online announced that they had acquired IP rights for The God of High School to develop a game based on the webtoon. A team school battle mobile RPG titled of the same name was later released on May 25, 2015. A music video from the original soundtrack of the game was released on August 11, 2016, on YouTube with singer Younha as lead vocalist. As of August 2023, the video has attracted over 10 million views.

A 3D mobile RPG game titled G.O.H. – The God of High School (G.O.H - 갓오브하이스쿨) developed by SN games Corp., was released on July 19, 2016, with an English version released on September 12, 2018. Jin Mo-ri was voiced by Kang Soo-jin, who is well known as the Korean voice actor of Luffy from One Piece.

In addition, the characters of Jin Mo-ri, Yu Mi-ra and Park Il-pyo appear as playable characters on I.O. Entertainment's 3D combat P.C. Lost Saga.

A cross-webtoon RPG game titled Hero Cantare was released in 2019, featuring The God of High School and other popular titles such as Tower of God and Hardcore Leveling Warrior.

=== Anime ===
An anime television series adaptation was announced in February 2020. MAPPA animated the series and Sola Entertainment provided production management. The anime is directed by Sunghoo Park, with scripts by Kiyoko Yoshimura, Manabu Akita designing the characters, and Alisa Okehazama composing the music. The opening theme is "Contradiction feat. Tyler Carter" by KSUKE, and the ending theme is "WIN." by CIX. It aired from July 6 to September 28, 2020, on Tokyo MX and AT-X in Japan, and on Aniplus and Naver Series On in South Korea. Crunchyroll is on the production committee of the series and simulcasts the Japanese original version of the anime. Muse Communication has licensed the series in Southeast Asia and South Asia and released on its Muse Asia YouTube channel and iQIYI. On August 11, 2020, Crunchyroll announced that the series would receive an English dub and premiere on August 24, 2020. Viz Media has licensed the series for home video distribution in North America and has been released on Blu-ray on April 19, 2022.

The anime also has an easter egg in it, where the fighting ring has the Crunchyroll and the Naver Webtoon logos on it, implying that the competition is sponsored by them. (Note: The God of High School episode 2, "renewal/soul")

==== Episodes ====
No.	Title	Directed by	Written by	Original release date
1	"set up/stand up" Transliteration: "Seoljeong / Il-eo" (Korean: 설정 / 일어)	Sunghoo Park	Kiyoko Yoshimura	July 6, 2020
Three criminals attempt to blackmail Park Mujin, a politician of the Korean National Assembly, only for the criminals to be murdered by supernatural means that flattens the island they are standing on. Mujin begins making preparations for the upcoming God of High School Martial Arts Tournament. Jin Mori, a 17 year old martial artist, is late for the preliminary tournament while chasing a purse thief on a motorbike and catches him by teaming up with 17 year old swordswoman Yu Mira and 17 year old martial artist Han Daewi. At the tournament it is explained fighters can use any martial art, bare fist or weapons. The fighters are injected with Nano-machines to monitor their vitals and heal injuries so they can fight harder. The announcer declares the fights will not be paired duels, but a mass brawl. Many fighters are defeated easily, until the Commissioners send in convicted criminal Kang Manseok, a super strong martial artist who fights only with his feet due to his wrists being handcuffed. He humiliates Mira by stealing her bokken then decides to duel Mori after Mori moves fast enough to avoid injury and even damage one of Manseok's ankles.
2	"renewal/soul" Transliteration: "Gaengsin / Yeonghon" (Korean: 갱신 / 영혼)	Katanao Akai	Shigeru Murakoshi	July 13, 2020
Park Mujin infiltrates Pentagon to see the President. It is revealed Mori never got to duel Manseok since Mira snapped Mori's neck to retrieve her bokken. The three fighters walk home together and Mori explains he entered the tournament for a rematch with the Commissioner who scouted him, Daewi wants money to pay for his friend, Woo Seungtae's, medical bills and Mira seeks a suitable husband so she can save her family's sword style by passing it to her children. Mori accidentally drops her bokken into the river so he and Daewi help her find it as it was a gift from her late father. At the next fight Mori, Mira and Daewi make it through their matches. Manseok fights Go Gamdo, a Tai Chi user. Manseok reveals he uses Northern Style Taekwondo designed for battlefield combat that allows moves such as eye gouging and groin strikes. Manseok beats Gamdo and demands he beg for mercy. Disgusted, Mori saves Gamdo. The Commissioners try to intervene but are overwhelmed by Manseok's rage at being humiliated. Despite this, Mori easily renders Manseok unconscious, only to find himself restrained by Mujin's unexplained powers. Mujin orders Mori be punished for interfering in a match.
3	"wisdom/kingdom" Transliteration: "Jihye / Wang-gug" (Korean: 지혜 / 왕국)	Yasuhiro Geshi	Akira Kindaichi	July 20, 2020
A mysterious cult watches the tournament. Mori faces disqualification until Mujin recognises Mori's grandfather, Jin Taejin. Mira defeats Mah Miseon, an American female wrestler who entered the tournament seeking men for her harem. Mira reveals her family martial art includes Swordless Style, which can slice flesh using only fingers. Mori is told he can remain if he beats one of the Commissioners, though not the Commissioner Mori wants. That night Mori eats a peach Mujin gave him and immediately vomits blood as it was not a normal peach. Daewi's friend Seungtae switches to a more expensive medication so Daewi becomes even more determined. He duels Baek Seungchul who fights with a baseball bat. Despite painful damage to his organs Daewi destroys his bat and knocks Seungchul unconscious. Mori awakens and only just makes it to his fight. He is told he will win if he can push the Commissioner to the floor, then when the Commissioner mocks him, he easily pushes him down. Mori is amazed his body feels more powerful, but the Commissioner is so angry he activates a supernatural power and summons a clown like spirit to kill Mori, only stopping after being restrained by his fellow Commissioners. Mujin happily confirms Mori is Taejin's "Tiger Cub" and swears to take possession of him.
4	"marriage/bonds" Transliteration: "Gyeolhon / Bondeu" (Korean: 결혼 / 본드)	Chie Nishizawa	Saori Kanaya	July 27, 2020
Mira is approached by Seongjin, a martial artist and businessman who asks her to marry him, promising he can make her sword style world famous. Mira withdraws from the tournament, angering Mori who criticises her for treating marriage like a business arrangement and becomes convinced Seongjin has an ulterior motive. Mira's uncle asks Seongjin to end the engagement for Mira's happiness, but Mira insists they continue. Mori decides to infiltrate the wedding. Seongjin has a flashback revealing he is a cult member ordered to marry Mira to obtain her Moon Light Sword style, believed to be capable of defeating God. Mori infiltrates the wedding with Daewi's help and tries to convince Mira alongside her uncle and cousin. Mira is convinced not to waste the effort she already put into saving her sword style herself and cancels the wedding. Enraged, Seongjin admits he only wanted Mira's Moon Light Sword and summons a Samurai spirit to kill them, managing to escape with Mira's bokken. Mira is unconcerned and decides to re-enter the tournament without it. Later, Seungtae deteriorates and Daewi snaps and assaults several bullies who routinely harass him at work. During his match against Mira Daewi wins by savagely beating the swordless Mira unconscious and promising to defeat Mori in the finals.
5	"ronde/hound" Transliteration: "Ronde / Haundo" (Korean: 론드 / 하운드)	Sunghoo Park	Kiyoko Yoshimura	August 3, 2020
In his youth Daewi shared a violent rivalry with Seungtae that developed into friendship. Mori defeats his next opponent and will face Daewi in the finals. In hospital Mira urges Mori to fight Daewi for the right reasons, not for revenge. As their match begins Daewi and Mori are evenly skilled and Mujin watches hoping Mori will "awaken". Mori knocks Daewi down and tries to show him mercy instead of taking revenge, but Daewi takes advantage, claiming he was never really their friend and unleashes a devastating attack. By chance Mira stumbles across Seungtae's room in hospital and finds his family in mourning as he had already died. Daewi knocks Mori down, but as the referee begins the countdown Mujin, who had promised to cure Seungtae if Daewi won, informs Daewi Seungtae is dead, hoping to unbalance him. Daewi flashes back through his entire friendship with Seungtae and decides to lose the match. Mira arrives and interrupts the match with a goodbye letter Seungtae wrote to Daewi. With renewed determination Daewi re-joins the fight, rediscovering his friendship with Mori. Mori deals a final blow to a happy Daewi, winning the match. Mujin comments that he seems to have found two "tiger cubs". As the three friends leave the ring together several other fighters watch them with interest.
6	"fear/SIX"; Transliteration: "Gongpo / Sigseu" (Korean: 恐怖 / 식스)	Yasutomo Okamoto; Park Si-hoo	Kiyoko Yoshimura	August 10, 2020
Mori's missing grandfather, Jin Taejin, refuses to join a mysterious cult, so they summon their God to destroy him. Mori is now Seoul's regional champion and can compete in the National Tournament with a team of the regionals strongest three fighters. Mira defeats her next opponent, making her the third fighter. Mujin hopes one fighter from Nationals will awaken as "the Key". The Commissioners worry over a group called NOX interfering so Mujin summons The Six, including his elderly former instructor, Na Bongchim, who decides to make Mori his pupil to provoke Jin Taejin. While shopping Mira meets the tournaments announcer, Sim Bongsa, with his family and realises Bongsa is actually blind. He advises her to channel her feelings into her sword to find the true strength of Moon Light Style, revealing it was Moon Light Style that blinded him. As Bongsa leaves he is approached by a NOX assassin, Priest Drake McDonald. Daewi demands Mujin tell him about the powers behind the tournament, so Mujin tells him about Charyeok, fighters who borrow power from Gods, demons, even historical heroes, and Mujin wants to find the strongest. The remaining members of The Six receive their summons and start to move. Daewi tells Mori and Mira about Charyeok, though this only makes Mori more excited about fighting strong opponents. As the National Tournament begins it is revealed that Drake not only killed Bongsa, but also seemingly Commissioner Q.
7	"anima/force" Transliteration: "Aeni Ma / Poseu" (Korean: 애니 마 / 포스)	Katanao Akai	Akira Kindaichi	August 17, 2020
At Nationals Mori and his friends face the North Chungcheong regional champions. Mori uses Bongchim's acupuncture techniques for strength, but accidentally paralyses himself and loses to Na Gidong. Drake brags to Q about killing Bongsa and his wife and baby. Q recovers and activates his Charyeok, the scythe wielding Joker playing card and cuts Drake's arms off. Drake recovers by using his Charyeok, Caterpillar, to reattach his arms. Daewi faces Jin Pumgwang, an unintelligent but hard working man who wants to help children who struggle in school. Pumgwang uses his Charyeok, Labourer, to summon a giant hammer, but Daewi knocks Pumgwang unconscious. Q almost kills Drake but is stopped by two NOX assassins, Priests Saturn and Axley Ivanovic. Commissioner O arrives to assist Q in combat. Meanwhile, Mira faces fellow swordswoman Jang Jangmi, a Kendo practitioner whom she defeats, winning the match for their team. Outmatched by O and Q, Saturn and Axley flee while Drake sets off an explosion from his own body that destroys the top of the building. Mujin determines that a traitor must have told NOX Q's home address. The severed arm of Jin Taejin is discovered, suggesting he was defeated and captured. The next team matches begin and Jegal Taek starts his match using his Charyeok, Megalodon, to brutally bite and rip his opponent. Daewi intervenes in the match but fails to stop Taek from claiming a sadistically violent victory.
8	"close/friend" Transliteration: "Chinhan / Chingu" (Korean: 친한 / 친구)	Kazue Ōtsuki	Shigeru Murakoshi	August 24, 2020
The South Jeolla team enter the semi-finals after the victory of Park Ilpyo using the ancient martial art Taekkyon and his Charyeok, Nine-Tails Guardian. Mori is suspicious the tiger on Ilpyo's jacket is the same as Taejin's military uniform. Daewi becomes interested in acquiring a Charyeok while Mori decides against using Charyeok. Mori is approached by Ilpyo who explains after his father died and his mother abandoned him Taejin gave him a Taekkyon training manual written by Ilpyo's deceased grandfather, inspiring him. Taek attempts to assassinate Ilpyo, almost killing Mori, but Ilpyo saves Mori. Q learns Bongsa's wife and baby are alive; Drake having actually killed doppelgangers created by P after Bongsa was killed. Mujin informs Q nine months' salary will be confiscated to cover the damages of his fight with Drake. Q runs into Daewi who, seeing Q has no money, offers him one free meal a day in exchange for Charyeok training. Mujin informs the Commissioners they have permission to use the full power of their Charyeok's to prevent NOX assassinating the Key. Mori becomes depressed over missing Taejin. Daewi and Mira receive anonymous messages informing then it is Mori's birthday and rush to celebrate with him, cheering him up. They decide to win the tournament together then duel each other to decide who is strongest. Mori receives a map and a photograph of Taejin imprisoned, missing his arm but still alive.
9	"curse/cornered" Transliteration: "Jeoju / Koneo" (Korean: 저주 / 코너)	Kunihiro Mori	Kiyoko Yoshimura	August 31, 2020
With Daewi suspended for having interfered in Taek's match they will automatically lose unless Mira and Mori both win, except Mori is missing. Mira begins her duel against Lee Marin who reveals he has Mira's stolen bokken, explaining he unlocked the full power of Moonlight Style where Mira failed and transforms her bokken into the sword Fengxian. Mira retrieves Fengxian, only for it to return to Marin, having recognised him as its true owner. Mori follows the map to Taejin, realising too late he is a fake which explodes. The bomber, Fei Long, reveals he is killing weaker fighters like Mori to locate the Key faster and that he uses the Charyeok Doppleganger to create clones. Marin stabs Mira, declaring her too weak to wield the power to kill God. Mori is overwhelmed by the clones until Long reveals Marin and his team are dead and replaced by NOX cultists disguised using Doppleganger. Furious, Mori uses an acupuncture technique to make him temporarily immune to pain. Mira refuses to give up and has a flash of divine inspiration, granting her the Charyeok Lu Bu Fengxian and true ownership of the Fengxian sword. Marin attempts to use his Charyeok, Kraken, but is defeated. Mori suddenly appears and easily defeats the second NOX imposter, flashbacks suggesting he killed Long to avenge the real Marin. Bongchim admits Mori has grown from Taejin's "Tiger Cub" into a true tiger.
10	"oath/meaning" Transliteration: "Seonseo / Uimi" (Korean: 선서 / 의미)	Sunghoo Park	Akira Kindaichi	September 7, 2020
Ilpyo remembers how Taek defeated his teammate, Seungyeong, ending her martial arts career. Now he is determined to get Seungyeong surgery to fix her leg. Mujin informs Mori and his friends that NOX worship a single God and plan to murder all other Gods and Charyeok users. Long is revealed to be alive, until Taek arrives, having gotten all the information he needed from Long. He then murders Long, declaring he will claim the Key. Mujin tells Mori he is too weak to help Taejin, but if he wins the tournament he will give him some valuable information. Daewi wins his semi-final match against Ilpyo's teammate Park Seungah. Seungyeong scolds Ilpyo for worrying about her when he should be keeping a promise he made to Taejin. Mujin confronts Sang Mandeok, a high ranking NOX cultist, who infiltrated the arena, only for Mandeok to summon his God. Mori struggles against Ilpyo, who points out his every weakness, only for Mori to begin overcoming his weaknesses by copying the fighting styles of both Mira and Daewi. One of The Six, Seo Hanryang, attacks the God with his 108 National Treasure weapons to protect the arena. After a lengthy battle the God is defeated and the arena saved. Meanwhile Mori defeats Ilpyo, who remembers the promise he made to Taejin that he would help Mori grow as a fighter if he ever had the chance. Ilpyo suddenly receives divine inspiration from his Charyeok, Nine-Tails Guardian, and awakens a new power. Mandeok happily declares the Key has finally awoken.
11	"lay/key" Transliteration: "Lei / Ki" (Korean: 레이 / 키)	Yasuhiro Geshi	Shigeru Murakoshi	September 14, 2020
Thousands of years ago the Nine Tailed Guardian was betrayed by God and, after destroying half of Heaven, fled to earth and swore revenge. All Charyeok users feel the awakening of Nine Tails and instinctively fear it, except Mori who is excited. While Ilpyo is stronger, his new power causes him pain. Mori almost loses his match to Ilpyo but suddenly wins with a strange power that overwhelms even the Nine Tails. Daewi and Mira ask Mori if he unlocked a Charyeok but Mori is unsure. Mujin senses the Nine Tails defeat and orders Ilpyo be secured immediately while Mandeok flees. Mori visits Ilpyo in hospital and explains about Jin Taejin still being missing. Elsewhere in the hospital Jeon Jugok, who lost his Charyeok, Mage, after being defeated by Taek, gains a new Charyeok from Mandeok, Greed, that allows him to absorb other people to increase his strength. He attacks Taek only for Taek to bite him in half with Megalodon and kill him. Everyone Jugok absorbed is expelled, including Ilpyo's teammates, who Ilpyo is horrified to see both had limbs bitten off by Megalodon. Furious that Taek once more injured people he cares about Ilpyo attacks Taek. Meanwhile, Mandeok opens his Gods summoning portal once more, allowing an army of creatures to appear. With the key located and the creatures approaching Mujin declares the God of High School Tournament officially over.
12	"FOX/GOD"; Transliteration: "Yeou / Haneunim" (Korean: 여우하 / 하느님)	Katanao Akai	Kiyoko Yoshimura	September 21, 2020
Sang Mandeok calls forth God incarnate in a final act to destroy the entirety of the world; thus ending the 11 episode long fighting tournament central to The God of High School. The United States is made aware of the situation and fires nuclear missiles on Seoul in an attempt to subdue the "old god", with complete disregard to the hundreds of thousands of lives to be lost as a result of this decision. The fight between Jegal Taek and Park Ilpyo continues, with Taek revealing his true form to gain an upper hand, he consumes Ilpyo and releases the key from within him. In a moment of frenzy upon the appearance of the Key, members of The Six, servants of the God, and Jin Mori clamor to seize the key, with Mori emerging with it in his possession. In order to protect the fighters, Park Mujin teleports them away to a spirit realm. With the missiles near and the citizens of Seoul stampeding to find shelter, Jeon Jaesan too teleports all of the people of Seoul to a cliffside outside of Seoul; from which they witness the destruction of the god at the hand of Jaesan and his transmutation magic. In a bright flash Mori and the other fighters are transported back to Seoul, where they see the body of the dead god. In the final moments the Key is stolen and consumed by Taek, and all bear witness to his ascension.
13	"GOD/GOD"; Transliteration: "Haneunim / Haneunim" (Korean: 하느님 / 하느님)	Sunghoo Park	Kiyoko Yoshimura	September 28, 2020
After consuming the key, Taek transcends his mortal body and becomes a God. He begins to ambush Jin Mori and his friends, threatening the consume everything in his way. Mori's memory is triggered and he remembers his true identity; he is actually the great God Sun Wukong (The Monkey King). Despite not remembering many details of his life before becoming a mortal, he jumps into action and summons his Ruyi Jingu staff to fight Taek. The Monkey King manages to get in several punches, and even drops constant lightning strikes using his power to summon Nimbus clouds. This enrages Taek and transforms him into a monster-like appearance. Mori's friends join in the fight and finish Taek for good. Kim Ungnyeo, founder of The Six, is awoken from her cave slumber and congratulates the group for completing the tournament and offers them a chance to have one wish granted. Mori initially wants to wish for his grandfather, but remembers Ilpyo's friends are missing limbs and unselfishly wishes for them to be healed. Ungnyeo tells Mori that his grandfather is still alive, and he finally loses consciousness as a result of the battle. He wakes up three months later, and Daewi and Mira inform him they must travel to the Monkey King's origin place to recover his memories as a God.

=== Other media ===
The series was featured on the South Korean reality music show Webtoon Singer, premiered on the streaming service TVING on February 17, 2023, which featured K-pop artists' performances combining webtoons with extended reality technology.

== Reception ==
Nicole Mejias of Crunchyroll said that the series, when on Line Webtoon was an easy sell as it evoked memories of "classic school battling anime" like Tenjho Tenge and fighting games, saying that the series has "top-notch" action with "gorgeous art," along with "various martial arts and skills" from the main cast.

The anime series was nominated at the 5th Crunchyroll Anime Awards in the categories: Best Animation, Best Score (Alisa Okehazama), and two for Best Fight Scene (Jin Mori vs. Han Daewi and Jin Mori vs. Jegal Taek).

== See also ==
- Taekkyon
- Korean Wave
