= Corps à corps =

- Directed by: François Hanss
- Written by: Arthur-Emmanuel Pierre
- Produced by: Claude Carrère; Patrick Gouyou-Beauchamps; Anne Regard
- Starring: Emmanuelle Seigner; Philippe Torreton
- Cinematography: Giovanni Fiore Coltellacci
- Edited by: Ermanno Corrado; Hervé de Luze; Nicolas Fay; Richard Leclers; Antoine Vareille
- Music by: Sarry Long
- Distributed by: Pathé Distribution
- Release date: 23 April 2003
- Running time: 101 minutes
- Country: France
- Language: French
- Budget: $4 million
- Box office: $465,000

Corps à corps (Also released as Corps du Corps or Body to Body) is a 2003 film, written by Arthur-Emmanuel Pierre and music by Sarry Long. Set in contemporary France, the film was produced by Carrère Groupe and Anne Regard and starred Emmanuelle Seigner and Philippe Torreton.

== Plot ==
Laura Bartelli is a stripper in a French bar. She retires after a moody landscape architect named Marco Tisserand asks her to abandon her life and share his. However, after her red Volkswagen runs off the road en route to the rendezvous, she ends up scarred and comatose in a hospital. Marco stays at her bedside.

After some months, she awakens in a world of silence and gradually begins her new life with Marco, which is filled with affection and tenderness. She begins to love herself as much as she loves Marco. They have a son, Jeannot. Laura's deafness is more an irritation than an impediment and six years pass in family harmony. However, when Jeannot displays an unusual dysfunction at school, she goes to see a psychologist in Lyon, and shows a photograph of her son with his father. The psychologist recognizes Marco as a former university student colleague and tells her that he is a doctor. She investigates and finds out that he is a doctor specialized in multiple transplants, and that his (also deaf) wife Claire and daughter Jeanne had a car accident and are in a coma. Their whereabouts are unknown. She further finds out that her own car accident is unregistered with the police, and that her "hospital room" was a room in her own house. The medications she has to take are for people who receive transplants. All this suggests that she received multiple transplants from the first wife: internal organs and a hand, and that her ability to hear was removed on purpose, thus creating a copy of the first wife.

After Laura comes back from her investigative tour, Marco imprisons her. He then confesses to her son that he chose Laura because she had a blood test at the hospital he worked, and that the blood characteristics were identical to his first wife. The "accident" did not happen as thought; instead, he put nails on the road so that she would crash and then ambushed and drugged her so she lost her memory of that moment. He gives his son a drink with a testosterone inhibitor, and tells him that he will have to drink it daily. Laura tries to escape with her son but they are recaptured. She is able to communicate with her son and tell him to switch off the family chateau's electricity. A second attempt to escape is successful, her son helps her to find the secret room where the comatose daughter/sister lies. When Marco comes with a syringe to paralyze Laura, there is a standoff and she cuts off the electricity there too. Marco falls on the syringe and dies.

Two months later, Laura gets ear implants and gets back 60% of her hearing. She and her son visit the grave of Marco and his first family. She wants to get rid of the hand and get a prosthesis.

== Cast ==
- Emmanuelle Seigner: Laura Bartelli
- Philippe Torreton: Marco Tisserand
- Clément Brilland: Jeannot
- Vittoria Scognamiglio: Doris
- Yolande Moreau: The Teacher
- Marc Duret: Doctor Azzeri
- Maurice Lamy: the owner of the Moon Side
- Lucien Jérôme: the EDF employee

== Notes ==
^{1} A penalty in fencing awarded when opponents touch each other with anything other than their weapons
