= Le Grand Meaulnes (film) =

- Film poster
- Directed by: Jean-Daniel Verhaeghe
- Written by: Alain-Fournier (novel); Jean Cosmos; Jean-Daniel Verhaeghe (screenplay)
- Produced by: Pascal Houzelot
- Starring: Nicolas Duvauchelle; Jean-Baptiste Maunier; Clémence Poésy; Jean-Pierre Marielle; Philippe Torreton
- Cinematography: Yves Lafaye
- Edited by: Dominique Faysse
- Music by: Philippe Sarde
- Production company: Mosca Film
- Distributed by: TFM Distribution
- Release date: 4 October 2006
- Running time: 97 minutes
- Country: France
- Language: French
- Budget: $6.7 million
- Box office: $5 million

Le Grand Meaulnes is a 2006 film directed by Jean-Daniel Verhaeghe, based on the classic novel of the same name. The film premiered on 4 October 2006 in France.

== Plot ==
The film begins on a night of November 1910. Mr Seurel, who manages a quiet country school in the Sologne, provides accommodation to a boarder accompanying his mother: Augustin Meaulnes.

Meaulnes shares the bedroom of Seurel's son, with whom he strikes up a friendship.

== Cast ==
- Jean-Baptiste Maunier as François Seurel
- Nicolas Duvauchelle as Augustin Meaulnes
- Clémence Poésy as Yvonne de Galais
- Jean-Pierre Marielle as Monsieur de Galais
- Philippe Torreton as Monsieur Seurel
- Émilie Dequenne as Valentine
- Malik Zidi as Franz
- Valérie Stroh as Millie
- Florence Thomassin as Madame Meaulnes
- Pascal Elso as Florentin
- Roger Dumas (II) as Clockmaker
- Pierre Vernier as Principal
- Charles Hurez as Delouche
- Clément Naslin as Delouche
- Samuel Brafman as Roy
- Andrée Damant

== Production ==
The film was partly filmed in Loir-et-Cher, at the Château de Roujoux in Fresnes, but also at the railway station in Valençay (Indre) and in Theuville (Val-d'Oise).
