= The Girl on the Train (2009 film) =

- Theatrical release poster
- Directed by: André Téchiné
- Written by: André Téchiné; Odile Barski; Jean-Marie Besset (play)
- Starring: Emilie Dequenne; Catherine Deneuve; Michel Blanc
- Cinematography: Julien Hirsch
- Edited by: Martine Giordano
- Music by: Philippe Sarde
- Distributed by: Strand Releasing
- Release date: 18 March 2009
- Running time: 105 minutes
- Country: France
- Language: French
- Budget: $5.8 million
- Box office: $1.7 million

The Girl on the Train (French: La fille du RER) is a 2009 French drama film directed by André Téchiné, starring Emilie Dequenne, Catherine Deneuve and Michel Blanc. The plot centers on an aimless girl who lies about being the victim of a hate crime.

== Plot ==
Jeanne Fabre, an attractive late-teen carefree loner, spends her time rollerblading through Paris and job-hunting, a nuisance she endures to indulge her widowed mother, Louise, who runs a day-care center out of their house. Watching a television news story about anti-semitic attacks, Louise recognizes Samuel Bleistein, a prestigious Jewish lawyer who was in love with her many years ago. Louise arranges a job interview for her daughter at Bleistein's law firm.

Samuel is visited by his son Alex, who has comes to Paris to celebrate his son Nathan's upcoming bar mitzvah. Alex's encounter with his ex-wife Judith, who is Samuel's assistant, is tense.

Jeanne's job interview is a disaster. Unfazed by this failure, Jeanne resumes rollerblading and unexpectedly meets Franck, a young wrestler, who instantly falls for her. A relationship ensues and the couple eventually move in together. Believing Jeanne has a job, Franck finds a job as well, as the caretaker in an electrical shop. The place turns out to contain hidden drugs and Franck is badly wounded in a fight with a drug dealer. The police arrest Franck, who rejects Jeanne when she visits him at the hospital, having found out that she was lying the whole time about having a job.

Heartbroken, Jeanne returns home to live with her mother. One night, Jeanne draws three swastikas on her body, gives herself some minor cuts and cuts off part of her hair. She soon alleges to the police to have been brutally attacked by six hoodlums on the suburban RER train because they thought she was Jewish (which she is not). The incident becomes a huge national cause célèbre—though Louise quietly believes her daughter has fabricated the incident.

Alex, still unsettled towards his ex-wife, decides not to go to Nathan's bar mitzvah. Judith begs him to reconsider, and they soon confirm that they do still love each other. At his hotel room, they make love and reconcile.

When Louise asks Samuel for help about Jeanne's problem, he invites them to join his family at his country house by a lake. As Samuel drives them all to his home, Nathan whispers to Jeanne that he believes she is lying about the whole affair. When all gather for dinner, Jeanne sticks to the same story she told the police: six youths approached her and, assuming she was Jewish, proceeded to assault her. After some extensive questioning, she decides to call it a night, but instead walks away and crosses the lake in a rowboat.

Nathan helps Jeanne when it starts to rain and invites her into his little shack, a safe haven to get away from his parents. As she is all wet, she strips down and sits next to the fireplace with Nathan. She shows him her scars, but eventually confesses that she made it up. Nathan convinces her to tell the others, and the next morning Jeanne confesses to Samuel. Samuel has her write and sign an open apology to all who were affected by the story. Jeanne and Louise return to Paris by train.

Jeanne goes to the police and is put in jail for 48 hours for her serious false statements. She eventually receives a suspended sentence and is required to attend psychiatric counseling. When Franck is interviewed by Samuel about Jeanne, Franck says he is still in love with her, despite her lying.

Samuel attends Nathan's bar mitzvah, when he also sees television footage of reporters interviewing Louise about the scandal. When they ask her about how her daughter knew the name of Bleistein, Louise lies and replies she does not know. Jeanne returns to live with her mother. She searches the internet for secretarial jobs. She receives a postcard from Nathan, who is in love with her. Jeanne is last seen rollerblading on a long path through trees.

== Cast ==
- Emilie Dequenne as Jeanne
- Michel Blanc as Samuel Bleistein
- Catherine Deneuve as Louise
- Mathieu Demy as Alex
- Ronit Elkabetz as Judith
- Nicolas Duvauchelle as Franck
- Amer Alwan as Le vendeur de bagages
- Arnaud Valois as Gabi

== Production ==
The Girl on the Train has its genesis on a real life case that made headlines in France. Marie Leonie Leblanc, a woman in her twenties, walked into a police station in Paris on 9 July 2004 claiming she had been the victim of an antisemitic attack on a suburban RER train. According to her account, six men of North African descent ripped her clothes, cut some of her hair and daubed a swastika on her stomach, knocking over the pram containing her baby. Fellow passengers did nothing to help. The case provoked national outrage for its virulent antisemitism; politicians and the media seized on the incident. President Jacques Chirac, condemned the "shameful act", while Israel's prime minister Ariel Sharon advised French Jews to emigrate to Israel to avoid " the wildest antisemitism". Four days later Leblanc, who was not Jewish herself, admitted she had made the whole affair up. The revelation that the incident was a total invention created consternation and further outrage, particularly criticized was the sensational exploitation of the affair by the media.

The case inspired Jean-Marie Besset's 2006 play RER which in turn was the base for Téchiné's film script. Téchiné was interested in what he called the "human truth" behind the case. "I wanted to explore the genealogy of a lie, how it came to being. That's why I divided the film into two parts. The first is the circumstances, so you see the context under which the young woman was able to construct her lie. You see the difference elements that she takes from the context around her and puts into. Bleinstein, whose name she has taken. It's the name on the business card found in her bag, which she claims is the reason for being attacked. That was how I constructed the story."

Téchiné cast in the leading role Belgian actress Emilie Dequenne, known internationally for her starring role in the Cannes Film Festival winner film Rosetta (1999). "I didn't want Jeanne to be depressive or a melancholic character," Téchiné explained. "I wanted her to be physical and athletic, which is why we came up with the idea of her rollerblading. It's significant that she falls in love with a top class athlete, which is based on the fact that the girl's real life lover was an athlete. And alongside her athleticism, Emilie has a day dreaming quality. In real life she is about 30, but in the film she looks much younger and more childlike."

== Reception ==
The film garnered a favorable critical reaction. On the review aggregator website Rotten Tomatoes, 76% of 63 critics' reviews are positive, with an average rating of 6.7/10. The website's consensus reads: "It's a bit of a comedown for director André Téchiné, but this fact-based drama raises some thorny questions -- and benefits from strong performances by Catherine Deneuve and Emilie Dequenne." Metacritic, which uses a weighted average, assigned the film a score of 68 out of 100, based on 21 critics, indicating "generally favorable" reviews.

James Berardinelli from ReelViews called the film "a compelling piece of cinema". In his review for Los Angeles Times, Kevin Thomas wrote: "The movie seems likely to be about anti-Semitism, but that's more the occasion than the subject". Mick LaSalle from the San Francisco Chronicle commented that "What it's really about – and this sounds so boring, and so nothing, when in fact it's really rather wonderful – is people. Just regular people, a mother and daughter, whose lives are observed with economy and precision, and with an eye for the telling detail and the tense, revealing moment." In Variety, Ronnie Scheib said that Téchiné "fashions a brilliantly complex, intimate multi-strander, held together but somewhat skewed by the central performance of Emilie Dequenne."

Steven Rea from The Philadelphia Inquirer commented that "Presented with an economy and emotional cool that add to, rather than subtract from, its dramatic impact, The Girl on the Train reverberates with a quiet, seductive power." Rene Rodriguez in his review for The Miami Herald concluded: "Like Techine's best films, the movie appears to be a story about nothing - until it suddenly becomes a meditation on the vagaries of the human heart." In The New York Times, Manohla Dargis called the film "A seductive drama."
