= Eliot Kid =

Animated television series

- Genre: Adventure; Children's television series Comedy
- Created by: Sebástian Dorsey
- Directed by: Gilles Cazaux; Pascal Valdés (season 2)
- Voices of: Mirabelle Kirkland; Leslie Lanker; Christine Flowers; Barbara Scaff; Jodi Forrest; Matthew Géczy
- Composer: Didler Julia
- Countries of origin: France; United Kingdom
- Original languages: French; English
- No. of seasons: 2
- No. of episodes: 104

Production
- Executive producers: Didler Julia; Samuel Raminka
- Editors: Thibaud Caquot; Etienne Jeantet
- Running time: 13 minutes

Original release
- Network: TF1 (France); CBBC (UK)
- Release: 3 March 2008 – 27 June 2012

Eliot Kid is an animated television series composed of two seasons and 104 episodes produced by Samka Productions, Safari de Ville, and CBBC. The series was directed by Gilles Cazaux. Lead voices and voice direction for both seasons were conducted by animation voice director, Matthew Géczy. The French version for both seasons was conducted by Kris Bénard.

The show is about a young boy who summons up blockbuster film scenarios from his imagination to challenge and inspire his friends.

== Characters ==
The voice cast consists of Barbara Scaff, and Mirabelle Kirkland, with Alistair Abell, Leslie Lanker, Christine Flowers, Jodi Forrest, and Matthew Géczy also starring.

=== Kid family ===
- Eliot Kid, a little kid with an overactive imagination that turns the most commonplace situations into Hollywood action-adventure blockbusters, but also has a bad-temper often, voiced by Barbara Scaff
- Isabelle Kid, Eliot and Suzie's mother and Jeremy's wife and the mayor of the city, voiced by Mirabelle Kirkland
- Jeremy Kid, Eliot and Suzie's father and Isabelle's husband who loves to invent things, voiced by Matthew Géczy
- Suzie Kid, Eliot's older sister, voiced by Leslie Lanker
- Salami, Eliot's family pet dog

=== Eliot's friends ===
- Kaytoo voiced by Jodi Forrest
- Mimi voiced by Christine Flowers

=== School staff ===
- Mr. Leon, Eliot's school principal, voiced by Matthew Géczy
- Ms. Brigitte, Eliot's teacher, voiced by Mirabelle Kirkland

Catherine Jacob dubbed Brigitte (the teacher) for the first season. Marion Game gave her voice to the character for the second season.

=== Others ===
- Max, Eliot's rival
- Loretta, a girl who is in love with Eliot, but hated by Mimi
- Jade, a babysitter who babysits anyone like Eliot
- Victor, a boy in glasses
- Michael, a boy who is fat and wears overalls
- Marcus, a boy who always wears his coat
- Mimi's mother, a tall, easygoing woman
- Mimi's father, a short, loud-mouthed and short-tempered man who always loses his temper and gets angry and annoyed by anything, especially when Eliot or Mimi messes with his stuff
- Sierra, an Asian girl with black hair and short pigtails, her best friend is Loretta
- Youki, a young timid Japanese boy who is almost an alien
- Raoul, a cousin teen boy who is mistaken as an alien and quite disliked by Eliot
- Danny, a boy who wears a black baseball hat, a black shirt, and pants and was nearly mistaken by a pirate boy

== Episodes ==
=== Season 1 (2008) ===
#	Title	Original air date
1	Wedding Impossible	3 March 2008
2	Invasion of the Robot Clones	4 March 2008
3	Aunt Margot	5 March 2008
4	The Bathroom Monster	6 March 2008
5	Igor	7 March 2008
6	20,000 Leagues	10 March 2008
7	The King of Dustmiteistan	11 March 2008
8	The Grand Prix	12 March 2008
9	Kung Fu Kid	13 March 2008
10	Eliot in Love	14 March 2008
11	The Musketeers' Plot	17 March 2008
12	The Broken Toy	18 March 2008
13	Moving to the Stars	19 March 2008
14	Stinkem the Ogre	20 March 2008
15	Only When I Laugh	21 March 2008
16	The Big Webster	24 March 2008
17	Mind Control	25 March 2008
18	Revenge of the Seniors	26 March 2008
19	The Vegetari-Man	27 March 2008
20	The New Kid in School	28 March 2008
21	The Little Mouse	7 April 2008
22	The Treasure Room	15 April 2008
23	Blue Lightning	2 May 2008
24	Hamsterman	6 May 2008
25	Shrinking Animals	4 July 2008
26	Eliot's Nightmare	7 July 2008
27	The Big Expedition	8 July 2008
28	Nature Is a Living Thing	9 July 2008
29	The Pirate Ghost	10 July 2008
30	Freddy Has Disappeared	13 July 2008
31	Youki the Extraterrestrial	14 July 2008
32	The Werewolf	15 July 2008
33	In the Time of the Pharaohs	16 July 2008
34	The Revolt	17 July 2008
35	The Christmas Elves	18 July 2008
36	The White Phantom	21 July 2008
37	Greenbeard	22 July 2008
38	The Villainous Vacuum	23 July 2008
39	Eliot Against the Bananas	24 July 2008
40	My Neighbour, The Yeti	25 July 2008
41	The Suit of Armour	28 July 2008
42	The Little Bunny That Grew	29 July 2008
43	Mission Pop-Corn	30 July 2008
44	The City Elections	31 July 2008
45	A Knight to Remember	1 August 2008
46	Class Photo	4 August 2008
47	The Magic Spell Book	5 August 2008
48	The Virus Code	6 August 2008
49	The Great Dog Competition	7 August 2008
50	The Age of Reason	8 August 2008
51	Halloween	27 October 2008
52	Snowman	28 December 2008

=== Season 2 (2011–12) ===
#	#	Title	Original air date
53	1	The Ghost Hunt	
54	2	Mimi the Mangus	
55	3	Enchanting Ice Cream	
56	4	The Senator's Visit	
57	5	The Vampire Ball	
58	6	Creepy Carpet	
59	7	The Cyber Teacher	
60	8	Diabolika	
61	9	The Buried City	
62	10	Shrinking Mimi	
63	11	Little Red Mimi	
64	12	Bewitched	
65	13	Iguanzilla	
66	14	Toy Alert	
67	15	Eliot the Kid	
68	16	Skate Park	
69	17	Game Over	
70	18	The Hungry Queen	
71	19	A Monstrous Smell	
72	20	Eliot Hood	
73	21	A Great Coach	
74	22	The Teeth Have Ears	
75	23	The Inspection	
76	24	My Muse Mimi	
77	25	The Rock Group	
78	26	Land of the Vikings	
79	27	Eliot Superstar	
80	28	The Call of the Wild	
81	29	Cyborg	
82	30	Theantypdois Cousin	
83	31	Dreadful Danny	
84	32	The Frog Prince	
85	33	The Cave Friend	
86	34	Wanted! Salami	
87	35	The Mummy's Curse	
88	36	In the Heart of the Jungle	
89	37	Mission: Earth	
90	38	The Flying Carpet	
91	39	The Iron Dragon	
92	40	Zed the Dragon	
93	41	Time Mix Up	
94	42	The Revenge of the Tree	
95	43	A Real Pig Star	
96	44	The Imp Thieves	
97	45	Mimi the Mermaid	
98	46	Hamsterific	
99	47	Eliot's Laurels	
100	48	Apocalypse Mutant	
101	49	The Invasion	
102	50	Mimi's Secret	
103	51	The Flower-in-Chief	
104	52	Life Without Mimi	27 June 2012
