= Ulzhan =

- Directed by: Volker Schlöndorff
- Written by: Jean-Claude Carrière; Volker Schlöndorff
- Produced by: Regis Ghezelbash; Sergey Azimov; Richard Martin Jordan
- Starring: Philippe Torreton; Ayanat Ksenbai; David Bennent
- Cinematography: Tom Fährmann
- Edited by: Peter R. Adam
- Music by: Bruno Coulais; Kuat Shildebayev; Ruben Haroutunian
- Distributed by: Rezo Films
- Release date: 13 December 2007
- Running time: 105
- Countries: France; Germany; Kazakhstan
- Languages: French; Kazakh

Ulzhan is a 2007 drama film directed by Volker Schlöndorff, starring Philippe Torreton, Ayanat Ksenbai (formerly credited as Ayana Yesmagambetova) and David Bennent.

== Plot ==
The Frenchman Charles travels in Kazakhstan and when his car stops working, he is determined to continue his journey by walking until he can get a horse. The young local French teacher Ulzhan decides to accompany and support him. She learns that Charles is heading for the mountain Khan Tengri. Along the way they are joined by New Age shaman Shakuni. They all approach the storied mountain which Shakuni considers holy. Whether they will find there a hidden treasure or salvation is left to the viewer's speculation.

== Reception ==
In Germany "Ulzhan" received "predominantly positive press reviews". Hans-Bernhard Moeller (associate professor of Germanic Studies at the University of Texas at Austin) and George Lellis (professor of communication at Coker College) honoured "Ulzhan" by publishing an in-depth review of 3582 words titled "Ulzhan: Schlöndorff’s Globalized Eastern Western". Their essay attests Volker Schlöndorff to have made "abstract issues" seizable "through transposing the conventions of the Western into the frontier between Europe and Asia –physically, intellectually, and spiritually". They also certified "Ulzhan" a "special complexity" achieved by "its refusal to let its themes be reduced to a simple bipolar opposition". Variety's very different review just compared "Ulzhan" with another film and came finally to a mathematical result which stated that 1 reel of The Treasure of the Sierra Madre delivered more clashes and oral exposition than the 10 reels of "Ulzhan". ABC's Julie Rigg compared "Ulzhan" instead with Paris, Texas and found it "haunting" but at the same time "mysterious and beautiful".
