= Constructing a Story =

Book by Yves Lavandier

- Author: Yves Lavandier
- Original title: Construire un récit
- Language: English
- Genre: Non-fiction
- Publication date: 2011
- Publication place: France
- English publication date: 2017
- ISBN: 9782874496998
- Preceded by: Writing Drama

Constructing a Story (French: Construire un récit) by filmmaker and script doctor Yves Lavandier (Writing Drama) is a treatise on conceiving and writing stories for the cinema, the theater, television, and comic books, but also for novels, albeit to a lesser degree. The English edition, translated by story consultant Alexis Niki, was published in May 2017 by Le Clown & l’Enfant.

== Content ==
Upon the re-publication of the French version of Writing Drama in 2011, Yves Lavandier decided to extract the book’s most useful chapters and to create two stand-alone books: Construire un récit and Evaluer un scénario (Analyzing a Script). Construire un récit grew from 50 pages in the French version of Writing Drama to 170, and then to 220 for the 2016 edition.

Constructing a Story is a practical handbook on how to write a narrative. Yves Lavandier’s ambition is to help authors who want to tell a story convey their thoughts and their universe in an accessible way. For this he proposes a method that starts from the meaning the author wants to communicate to arrive at the complete narrative via the steps of the pitch, the foundations, the milestones, the step outline, and the treatment. The general principle of Lavandier’s approach is: "You don’t build a house starting with the wallpaper."

As in Writing Drama, the author puts forth a vision of the three-act structure that differs to that of many English-speaking theorists and that he considers "simple, logical, and more importantly, natural: before the action, during the action, after the action."

In addition to several passages covering the work of characterization, a large chapter is dedicated entirely to the character arc, the potential for psychological transformation for one of the characters. The author proposes tools to justify such a transformation and analyzes some twenty works from the specific angle of the character arc. Among these are: The Apartment, Casablanca, A Christmas Carol, Groundhog Day, The Lives of Others, Oedipus Rex, One Flew Over the Cuckoo’s Nest, One Thousand and One Nights, Schindler’s List, The Taming of the Shrew, and Toy Story. In his analysis of the beginning of Tootsie, for example, Yves Lavandier points out that contrary to many other analyses, the protagonist (Dustin Hoffman) is not actually characterized as a chauvinist who needs to learn to respect women.

== Front cover ==
The cover photo represents romanesco broccoli, a natural example of fractal structure. Yves Lavandier considers the objective-obstacle pairing to be the basic pattern of story, and to follow the fractal principle. In Lavandier’s view, narrative is the combination, at different scales, of thousands of objective-obstacle pairings and of their resulting mechanisms: the protagonist, the inciting incident, the three-act structure, the climax, etc. The author uses the 1968 film Once Upon a Time in the West to illustrate his point.

== Reception ==
In the magazine L’Avant-Scène Cinéma issue 609 (January 2014), Jean-Philippe Guérand writes: "Constructing a Story is a veritable guide of writing know-how in which the author prods his reader and pushes the emerging screenwriter to give his best with sections such as 'Be ferocious to your protagonist' or 'Make the audience participate', and is applicable to both cinema and television."

Jack Brislee of The Story Department gave the book a mostly positive review, saying "Lavandier’s Constructing a Story, like his previous work, Writing Drama, is an original, erudite work, packed with helpful ideas based on the author’s many years of research, teaching and writing." Ray Morton of ScriptMag also praised the English translation of the book, saying "it does an excellent job of laying out the core and the advanced concepts of dramatic storytelling and how they apply to telling tales on the screen."

"The chapter on creating story and character arcs is unique", writes screenwriter and novelist Ann Kimbrough, "I’ve never seen anyone break down arcs in this manner. I found it very useful as a writer of any medium. It’s a MUST READ part of the book."
