= Dreamago =

DreamAgo is an international non-profit organization for the Cinema, based in Sierre, Switzerland. Often referred to as the Sundance of Europe, for its alpine location in the Swiss Alps, Dreamago holds its international screenwriting workshop, Plume et Pellicule, each May. Experienced talents in the film industry lend their experience and knowledge to up-and-coming screenwriters. Stephen Frears, Alain Corneau, Guillermo Arriaga, Jose F. Lacaba and Jorge Perugorría are Dreamago's patrons.

Dreamago was launched in 2005, under the presidency of Pascale Rey.

== Programs ==
- Plume & Pellicule (which means in French "Quill & Celluloid") is held every year, at the beginning of May, in Sierre. For a week, ten screenwriters meet with professional script consultants and are offered feedback on their scripts. Projects and consultations are in English, French or Spanish. David Seidler, Christopher Hampton, Maggie Soboil, Carl Gottlieb, Arturo Arango, Fernando Castets, Lindy Davies, Yves Lavandier are some of the past and present consultants. Writer Casey Maxwell Clair described Plume & Pellicule as a screenwriter's heaven.

- Meet Your Match is a springboard for closely selected scripts. After Plume & Pellicule, writers are asked to rewrite and submit a new draft. The best scripts are offered to be presented to producers during the American Film Market, held in Santa Monica each November. Personal meetings with the writers are set up.
