= Joseph Plateau Awards 2000 =

15th Joseph Plateau Awards

2000

Best Film:
Rosetta

The 14th Joseph Plateau Awards honoured the best Belgian filmmaking of 1999 and 2000.

== Winners ==
=== Best Belgian Actor ===
Josse De Pauw - Everybody's Famous! (Iedereen beroemd!)

- Peter Van den Begin - Film 1
- Olivier Gourmet - The Journey to Paris (Le voyage à Paris) and Rosetta

=== Best Belgian Actress ===
Émilie Dequenne - Rosetta

- Antje De Boeck - A Dog of Flanders
- Eva Van Der Gucht - Everybody's Famous! (Iedereen beroemd!)

=== Best Belgian Director ===
Jean-Pierre and Luc Dardenne - Rosetta

- Dominique Deruddere - Everybody's Famous! (Iedereen beroemd!)
- Frédéric Fonteyne - A Pornographic Affair (Une liaison pornographique)

=== Best Belgian Film ===
Rosetta

- Everybody's Famous! (Iedereen beroemd!)
- A Pornographic Affair (Une liaison pornographique)

=== Box Office Award ===
Rosetta

=== Joseph Plateau Music Award ===
Wim Mertens - Molokai: The Story of Father Damien

=== Joseph Plateau Award of Honour ===
Hans Zimmer

=== Joseph Plateau Life Achievement Award ===
Morgan Freeman
