= Philippe Torreton =

French actor (born 1965)

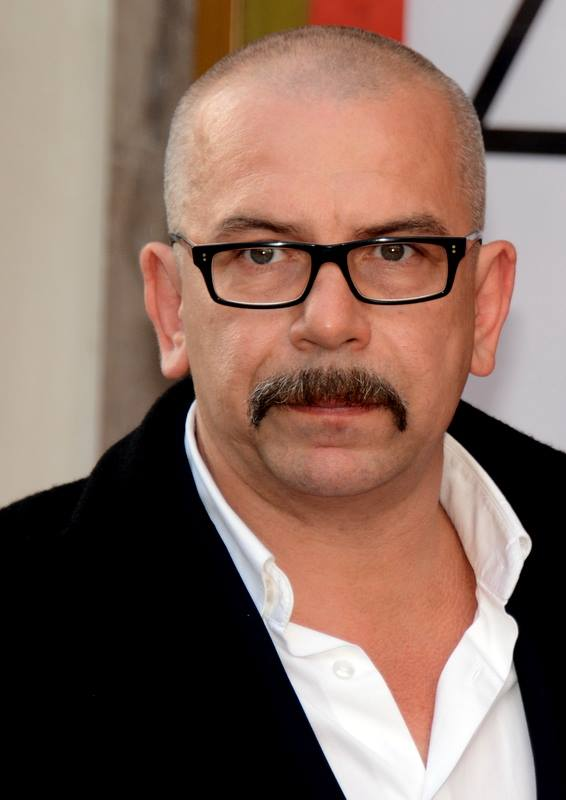
- Torreton in 2014
- Born: 13 October 1965 (age 60); Rouen, Normandy, France
- Occupations: Actor, politician
- Years active: 1990–present
- Height: 1.77 m (5 ft 10 in)
- Awards: Best Actor; 1997 Capitaine Conan

Philippe Torreton (born 13 October 1965) is a French actor.

== Life and career ==
Born in Rouen, to a teacher mother, and filling station attendant father, Torreton grew up in a suburb of the city. A student at the lycée Val de Seine de Grand-Quevilly, he discovered there a certain liking for the theater that he nurtured, thanks to his teachers, - he often cites one in particular, - M.Désir. A student of CNSAD, he would return there, this time as a teacher, in October 2008.

Torreton entered the Comédie-Française in 1990 as a pensionnaire (salaried actor having no share in the profits) and became a sociétaire (shareholding member of the Comédie-Française) in 1994. He left in 1999 having played many prestigious roles including Scapin, Lorenzaccio, Hamlet, Henry V, Tartuffe.

He played Capitaine Conan in the film of the same name, directed by Bertrand Tavernier, based on a little-known incident from the time of the First World War, and for which he won the César Award for Best Actor 1997. And, a politically committed actor, he played the role of the principal of a primary school confronted with social problems in Ça commence aujourd'hui, again directed by Tavernier, in 1998.

He was elected in the Municipal council of the 9th arrondissement of Paris.

On 10 April 2020, during the coronavirus lockdown, Torreton was one of a handful of people to take part in a Good Friday service led by Michel Aupetit, Archbishop of Paris, in the Cathedral of Notre-Dame de Paris, still being rebuilt after the fire a year earlier. All wore protective clothing. During the service, Torreton read Francis Jammes' "Je vous salue, Marie".

== Selected filmography ==
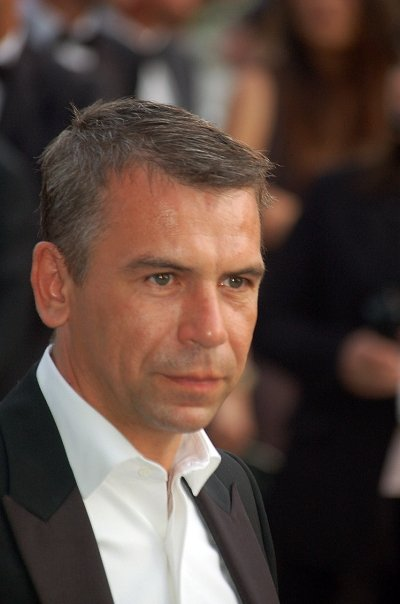
Philippe Torreton at the 2007 Cannes Film Festival.

Year	Title	Role	Director	Notes
1991	La neige et le feu		Claude Pinoteau	
1992	L.627	Antoine	Bertrand Tavernier	
1993	Une nouvelle vie	Fred	Olivier Assayas	
1994	Oublie-moi	Fabrice	Noémie Lvovsky	
1994	L'ange noir	Christophe	Jean-Claude Brisseau	
1994	Le petit qui attend le facteur		Anne-Marie Etienne	
1995	The Bait	Chief cop	Bertrand Tavernier	
1996	Le bel été 1914	Ernest Pailleron	Christian de Chalonge	
1996	Capitaine Conan	Capitaine Conan	Bertrand Tavernier	
1996	La serva amorosa	Arlequin	Jean Douchet	
1999	It All Starts Today	Daniel Lefebvre	Bertrand Tavernier	
1999	Tôt ou tard	Éric	Anne-Marie Etienne	
2001	Félix et Lola	Félix	Patrice Leconte	
2001	Vertiges de l'amour	Vincent	Laurent Chouchan	
2003	Monsieur N.	Napoleon	Antoine De Caunes	
2003	Corps à corps	Marco Tisserand	François Hanss	
2004	The Light	Yvon Le Guen	Philippe Lioret	
2005	Sky Fighters	Bertrand	Gérard Pirès	
2005	Les Rois maudits	Robert d'Artois	Josée Dayan	TV Mini-Series
2006	Le Grand Meaulnes	M. Seurel	Jean-Daniel Verhaeghe	
2007	Jean de la Fontaine, le défi	Colbert	Daniel Vigne	
2007	Ulzhan	Charles	Volker Schlöndorff	
2009	District 13: Ultimatum	The President	Patrick Alessandrin	
2011	Guilty	Alain Marécaux	Vincent Garenq	
2011	The Art of Love	Narrator	Emmanuel Mouret	
2011	Rebellion	Christian Prouteau	Mathieu Kassovitz	
2013	Mood Indigo	Jean-Sol Partre	Michel Gondry	
2013	La Pièce manquante	André Mouton	Nicolas Birkenstock	
2016	Les Enfants de la chance	Docteur Daviel	Malik Chibane	
2017	Mystère au Louvre	Inspector Thénard	Léa Fazer	TV film
2019	Infidèle	Rodolphe		TV series

== Decorations ==
- Officer of the Order of Arts and Letters (2016)
