= The Light (2004 film) =

- Theatrical release poster
- L'Équipier
- Directed by: Philippe Lioret
- Written by: Philippe Lioret; Emmanuel Courcol; Christian Sinniger
- Produced by: Christophe Rossignon
- Starring: Grégori Derangère; Sandrine Bonnaire; Philippe Torreton; Émilie Dequenne
- Cinematography: Patrick Blossier
- Edited by: Mireille Leroy
- Music by: Nicola Piovani
- Distributed by: Mars Distribution
- Release date: 3 November 2004
- Running time: 94 minutes
- Country: France
- Language: French
- Budget: $7.6 million
- Box office: $5.2 million

The Light (French: L'Équipier) is a 2004 French film directed by Philippe Lioret and starring Sandrine Bonnaire, Émilie Dequenne, Grégori Derangère, and Philippe Torreton.

== Plot ==
Following her mother's demise Camille returns to the isle which once was her home. She comes across the written memories of former lighthouse guard Antoine Cassendi. The unpublished book changes her life.

== Cast ==
- Sandrine Bonnaire as Mabé Le Guen
- Philippe Torreton as Yvon Le Guen
- Grégori Dérangère as Antoine Cassenti
- Émilie Dequenne as Brigitte
- Anne Consigny as Camille
- Martine Sarcey as Jeanne
  - Nathalie Besançon as Younger Jeanne
- Christophe Kourotchkine as Lebras
- Jean Sénéjoux as Rémi
- Thierry Lavat as Tinou
- Éric Bonicatto as Jo
- Béatrice Laout as Nicole
- Frédéric Pellegeay as Théo
- Bernard Mazzinghi as André
- Nadia Barentin as Huberte
- Blandine Pélissier as Christiane

== Accolades ==
Award / Film Festival	Category	Recipients and nominees	Result
César Awards	Best Actor	Philippe Torreton	Nominated
César Awards	Best Supporting Actress	Émilie Dequenne	Nominated
César Awards	Best Original Music	Nicola Piovani	Nominated
