= Kim Ki-hyeon =

South Korean voice actor

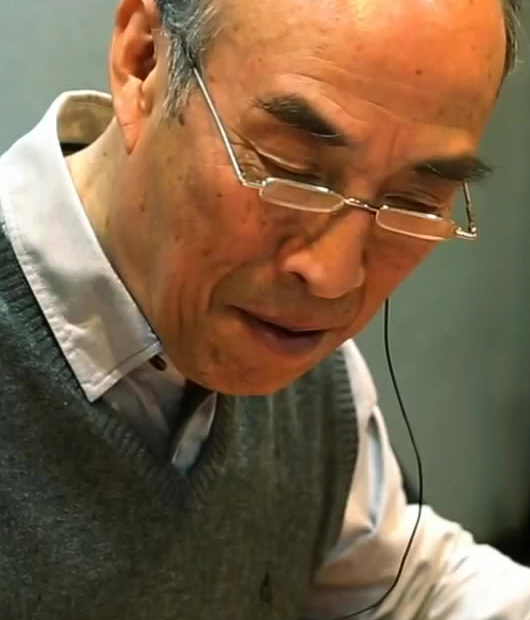
Kim in 2013

Kim Ki-hyeon (Korean: 김기현; born June 24, 1945) is a South Korean voice actor and actor. He joined the Munhwa Broadcasting Corporation's voice acting division in 1965.

== Roles ==
=== Broadcast TV ===
- 24 (television) (replacing Tobin Bell by Season 2, Korea TV Edition, MBC)
- Cubix (Dr. K, SBS)
- MacGyver (replacing Dana Elcar, Korea TV Edition, MBC)
- K-Cops (Korea TV Edition, MBC)
- Brain Survivor (narration, MBC)
- You're Under Arrest (Korea TV Edition, Tooniverse)
- Miracle Girls (Korea TV Edition, MBC)
- Jurassic War (MBC) - Terra
- Penking & Liking (MBC)
- My Little Pony: Friendship Is Magic (Korea TV Edition, Tooniverse)

=== Film ===
==== Dubbing ====
- Rules of Engagement (replacing Tommy Lee Jones, Korea TV Edition, MBC)
- Deep Impact (replacing Robert Duvall, Korea TV Edition, MBC)
- The Long Kiss Goodnight (replacing Samuel L. Jackson, Korea TV Edition, MBC)
- Lethal Weapon 3 (replacing Stuart Wilson, Korea TV Edition, MBC)
- Ricochet (replacing John Lithgow, Korea TV Edition, MBC)
- Leon (replacing Jean Reno, Korea TV Edition, KBS)
- The Hunchback of Notre Dame (replacing Anthony Queen, Korea TV Edition, KBS)
- Clean (replacing Nick Nolte, Korea TV Edition, SBS)
- Police Academy (replacing Lt. Moses Hightower, Korea TV Edition, MBC)
- Up (replacing Christopher Plummer)

==== Actor ====
- 5th Republic (2005) - Jang Tae-wan
- Flu (2013)
- Steel Rain (2017)
- Feel Good to Die (2018)

=== Game dubbing ===
- Starcraft II (Zeratul, replacing Fred Tatasciore)

== See also ==
- Munhwa Broadcasting Corporation
- MBC Voice Acting Division
