= David Bennent =

Swiss actor

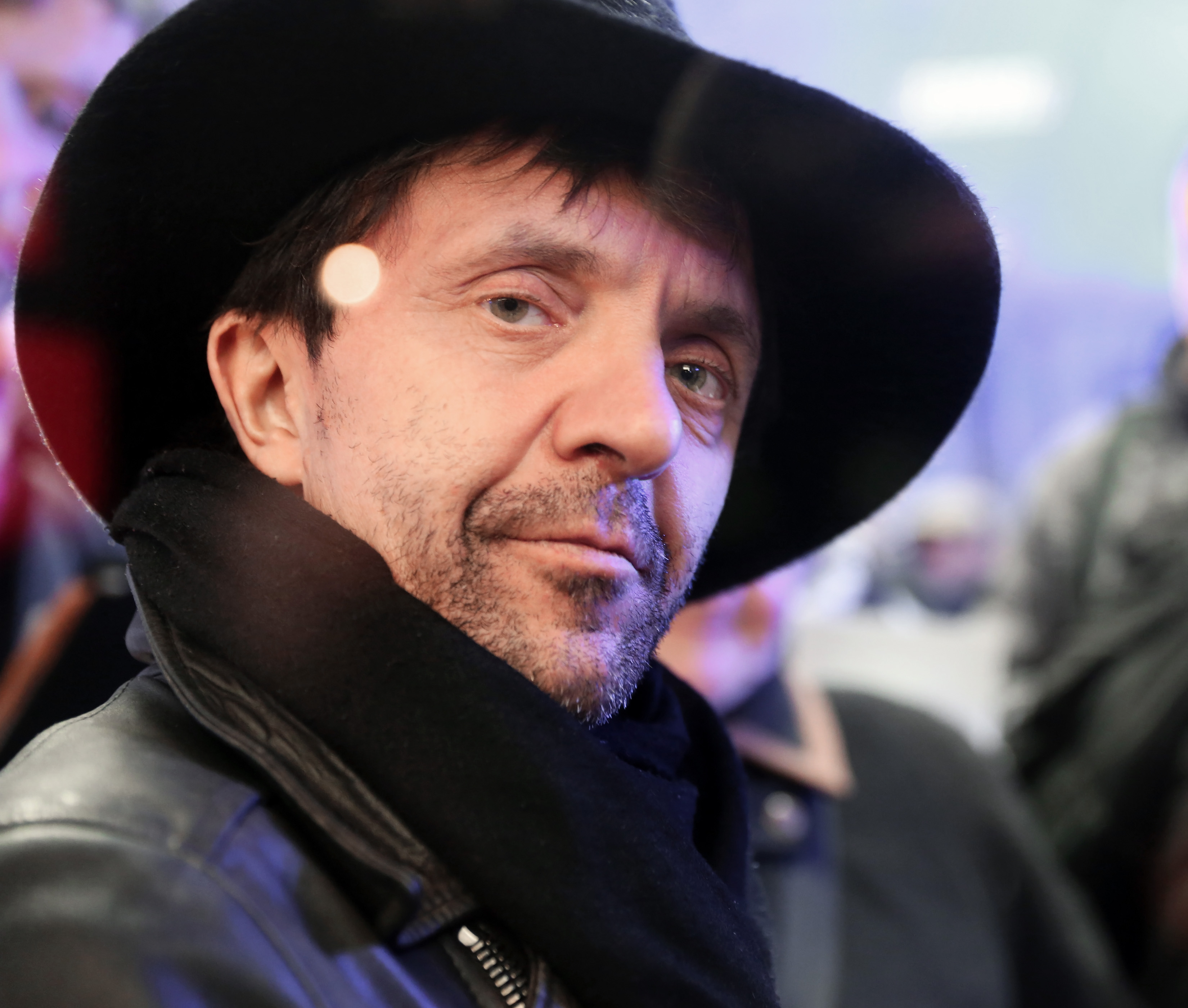
- Bennent in 2014
- Born: 9 September 1966 (age 59); Lausanne, Switzerland
- Occupation: Actor
- Years active: 1979–present
- Parent(s): Heinz Bennent, Diane Mansart
- Relatives: Anne Bennent (sister)

David Bennent (born 9 September 1966) is a Swiss actor.

== Biography ==
He was born in Lausanne, Switzerland. His parents are German actor Heinz Bennent and French former dancer Diane Mansart. His sister, Anne Bennent, is also an actress.

He has lived in Germany and France as well as Switzerland and speaks fluent German, French and English.

When he was 11, he starred in The Tin Drum, which caused much controversy because he was shown in sex scenes with an adult. At age 17, he starred as Honeythorn Gump in the film Legend, co-starring with Tom Cruise and Mia Sara.

Bennent has appeared in such plays as Peer Gynt (2004), Die Juden (2003), Michael Kramer (2003), and A Midsummer Night's Dream (2002).

== Selected filmography ==
- The Tin Drum (1979)
- Dog Day (1984)
- Legend (1985)
- She Hate Me (2004)
- Ulzhan (2007)
- Michael Kohlhaas (2013)
- Therapy for a Vampire (2014)
- Fog in August (2016)
- Happy as Lazzaro (2018)

== Television ==
- Derrick – Season 12, Episode 5: "Wer erschoß Asmy?" (1985)
- Tatort – Väterchen Frost (2019)

== Bibliography ==
- Holmstrom, John. The Moving Picture Boy: An International Encyclopaedia from 1895 to 1995. Norwich, Michael Russell, 1996, p. 362.
