= Therapy for a Vampire =

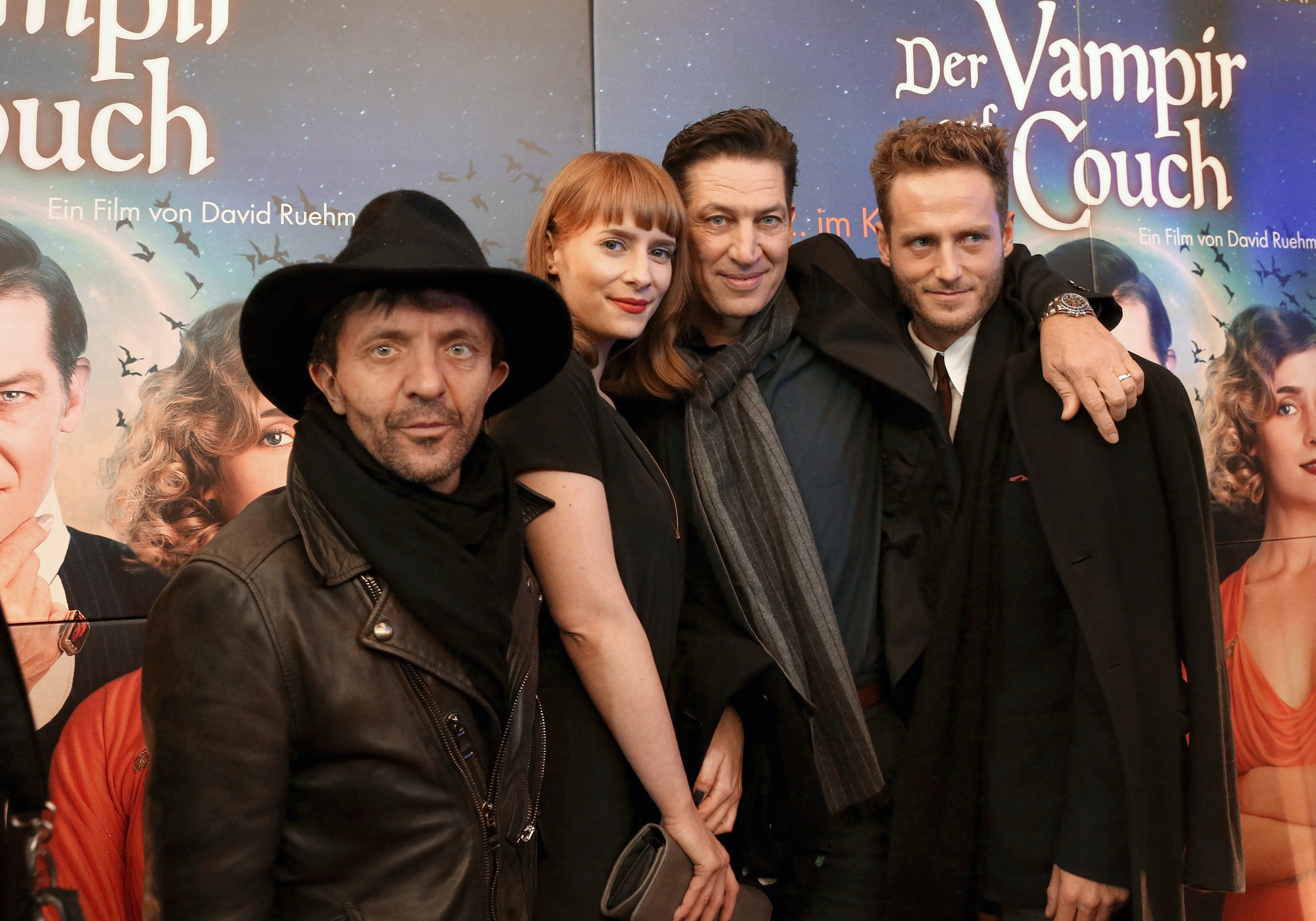
- Directed by: David Ruehm
- Written by: David Ruehm
- Starring: Tobias Moretti; Jeanette Hain; Cornelia Ivancan; Dominic Oley; David Bennent
- Cinematography: Martin Gschlacht
- Production companies: Novotny & Novotny Filmproduktion GmbH, hugofilm
- Distributed by: Music Box Films
- Release dates: 26 September 2014 (Zurich); 19 December 2014 (Austria)
- Running time: 87 minutes
- Countries: Austria; Switzerland
- Language: German

Therapy for a Vampire (German: Therapie für einen Vampir) is a 2014 Austrian comedy horror film. It was written and directed by David Ruehm.

== Plot ==
In 1932 Vienna, Austria, Professor Sigmund Freud begins providing psychological therapy to Count Geza Von Kösznöm, a depressed vampire who is unhappy with his centuries-long marriage. Von Kösznöm's wife, Countess Elsa Von Kösznöm, is also a vampire and longs to admire herself but is unable to view herself in a mirror or have a portrait of herself painted. Freud offers his assistant, Viktor, to attempt to paint her portrait.

The Count observes Lucy, Viktor's girlfriend, recognizing her as a reincarnation of his first love Nadilla, a woman executed centuries ago. Geza attempts to seduce Lucy only to be interrupted by his wife. The next evening Elsa visits and hires Viktor to paint her portrait. Geza once again tries to cast a spell upon Lucy in order to bring back Nadilla but is discovered by Elsa, who bites Lucy but is chased away before she can kill her (anyone fed off of by a vampire transforms into one themselves unless their heart is removed from their body). Lucy starts transforming into a vampire. Ignaz, Geza's assistant, who is smitten with Lucy, kidnaps and performs a blood transfusion on her, allegedly stopping the transformation process. While trying to attack Geza, Elsa impales herself with a wooden stake and turns into dust. Geza breaks a fang attempting to bite Lucy through a Byzantine neckpiece. He flies off as a bat as Lucy falls to the ground, caught by Viktor. In the end, it is revealed that the blood transfusions only temporarily restored her humanity, as she is still a vampire. Freud also develops minor vampiric abilities due to Lucy accidentally biting him earlier in the film while she was still going through the transformation into a vampire.

== Cast ==
- Tobias Moretti as Count Geza von Közsnöm
- Jeanette Hain as Countess Elsa von Közsnöm
- Cornelia Ivancan as Lucy
- Dominic Oley as Viktor
- David Bennent as Radul
- Karl Fischer as Dr. Sigmund Freud
- Erni Mangold as Fräulein Sedlacek
- Lars Rudolph as Oscar
- Anatole Taubman as Ignaz, der Einbrecher
- Julia Jelinek as Dienstmädchen
- Christoph Krutzler as Olaf
- Tobias Ofenbauer as Klaus Heinrich
- Dominic Marcus Singer as Bote mit Blumen

== Release ==
The film premiered at the 2014 Zurich Film Festival. It had an Austrian theatrical release on 19 December 2014.

== Reception ==
On the review aggregator website Rotten Tomatoes, 63% of 30 critics' reviews are positive, with an average rating of 6.3/10. The website's consensus reads: "Therapy for a Vampire should get a few chuckles out of vampire movie fans in search of something new, even if it never quite lives up to its daffy potential." Metacritic, which uses a weighted average, assigned the film a score of 50 out of 100, based on eight critics, indicating "mixed or average" reviews.

The film won the Audience Award for Best Foreign Feature at the 2015 Fantasia International Film Festival. At the 2016 Austrian Film Awards, Karl Fischer received a nomination for Best Supporting Actor, Monika Buttinger for costumes, and Sam Dopona for makeup.
