= The Pack (2010 film) =

- Directed by: Franck Richard
- Written by: Franck Richard
- Produced by: Verane Frediani; Franck Ribiere
- Starring: Yolande Moreau; Benjamin Biolay; Émilie Dequenne; Philippe Nahon
- Cinematography: Laurent Barès
- Edited by: Olivier Gajan
- Music by: Chris Spencer; Ari Benjamin Meyers Chris Spencer
- Production companies: La Fabrique 2 BE-FILMS; Motion Investment Group
- Distributed by: La Fabrique de Films
- Release date: 15 May 2010 (Cannes)
- Running time: 86 minutes
- Countries: France; Belgium
- Language: French
- Budget: $3.4 million
- Box office: $275.000

The Pack (French: La meute) is a 2010 horror film directed, written and co-produced by Franck Richard. It stars Yolande Moreau, Philippe Nahon, Émilie Dequenne and Benjamin Biolay. The film is about Charlotte and Max who come across a restaurant. After Max disappears, Charlotte returns later to find him and gets herself trapped in a cage by the restaurant owner, who has a pack of cannibals with her. The film premiered at the Cannes Film Festival on 15 May 2010 and was first shown in North America at the Fantasia Festival. The film has received generally mixed reviews.

== Plot ==
A young female traveler, Charlotte (Émilie Dequenne) gets into a fight with a group of bikers. After this, she meets Max, a hitchhiker. The two stop off at La Spack, a rundown roadside eatery run by a woman (Yolande Moreau), after whom the restaurant is named. The biker gang reappears and is chased off by the owner of the restaurant. Moments later, Max vanishes after heading to the bathroom. Charlotte elects to investigate at nightfall to the spot where Max disappeared. Charlotte later finds herself bound and caged, a prisoner of La Spack, who sees her as the next meal for her brood, a pack of ghouls.

== Cast ==
- Yolande Moreau as La Spack
- Émilie Dequenne as Charlotte
- Philippe Nahon as Chinaski, a retired cop.
- Benjamin Biolay as La Spack's son
- Eric Godon as Jean-Jean
- Matthias Schoenaerts as The Gothic sham

== Production ==
The Pack is the debut feature of director Franck Richard. Richard said that he created the film as he had "liked genre films ever since I was a child"

== Release ==
The Pack was originally slated to have an outdoor screening of the film shown at the Cannes Film Festival on 17 May 2010. This idea was halted by the Classification Committee of the NCC, who did not want the film to be seen by people under the age of 16. The Pack premiered at Cannes for the press on 15 May and for the public on 17 May 2010. The film had its North American premiere at the Fantasia Festival on 20 July 2010. Icon has bought the rights for the United Kingdom release of the film. The film was released as part of the Bloody Disgusting Selects line.

== Reception ==
The horror film magazine Fangoria described the film as a hybrid of Calvaire and Haute Tension stating that the film "unfortunately shapes up as one of the weakest in the past decade’s resurgence of French-language frights." Variety wrote that The Pack "does fun things with its ranch-like setting, playful gore and creatures known as ghouls, yet it's too uproariously modeled on every late night classic under the sun to feel fresh or dramatically apt." Empire wrote a negative review, saying that "Though certainly original, the creatures eventually revealed in Franck Richard's The Pack are far less entertaining than the game of guess-the-genre that the director deftly plays in the film's first third." The film was nominated for a Magritte Award in the category of Best Production Design in 2012.
