= An Jang-hyeok =

South Korean voice actor

An Jang Hyeok (Korean: 안장혁) is a South Korean voice actor who joined the Munhwa Broadcasting Corporation's voice acting division in 1993.

== Roles ==
=== Broadcast TV ===
- Geisters (MBC)
- Ojamajo Doremi (Korea TV Edition, MBC)
- Anpanman (Korea TV Edition, MBC)
- Red Baron (Korea TV Edition, MBC)
- Slam Dunk (Korea TV Edition, SBS)
- Soul Frame LAZENCA (MBC) - Maru
- Vectorman: Warriors of the Earth (KBS)
- Maroon (Korea TV Edition, MBC)
- Beyblade (Korea TV Edition, SBS)
- Jurassic War (MBC) - Deka, Alo
- Tommy & Oscar (Korea TV Edition, MBC)
- The God of High School (Aniplus) - Gang Man-Suk

=== Movie dubbing ===
- Crayon Shin Chan (Movie Edition, MBC)

=== Games ===
- MapleStory - Kyson, Hekaton

== See also ==
- Munhwa Broadcasting Corporation
- MBC Voice Acting Division

== Homepage ==
- Daum Cafe Voice Actor An Jang Hyeok Fan Cafe(in Korean)
- MBC Voice Acting Division An Jang Hyeok Blog(in Korean)
