= Regis Ghezelbash =

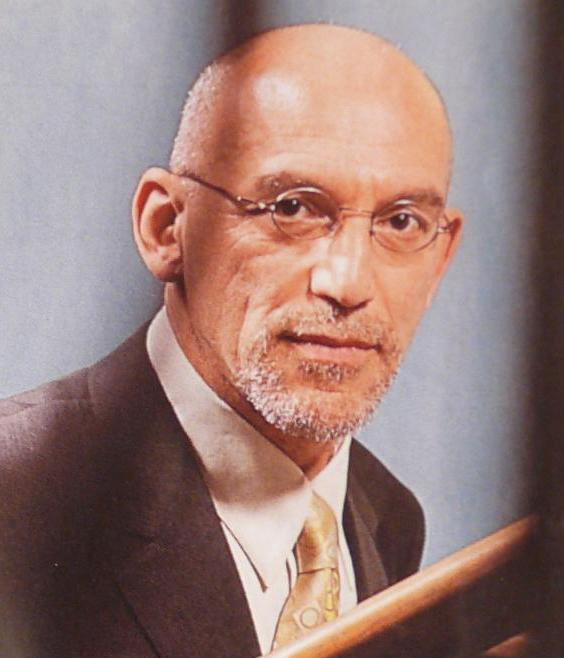

Regis Ghezelbash (16 June 1951 in Tehran – 18 January 2017 in Paris) was a Paris-based documentary creator, a feature film animator and live action director and producer. He was a graduate of University of Grenoble, and its school of Audio Visual Communication Science.

In 2002, he received the order of "Chevalier des Arts et Lettres" from the French government for his cultural contributions.

He has been the key person in initiating cultural bridges and cooperations between France, Eurasia and the Asia-Pacific cultures through cinematographic initiatives such as the French-Kazak movie Ulzhan and French-Korean movie Filmaker.
