= Writing Drama =

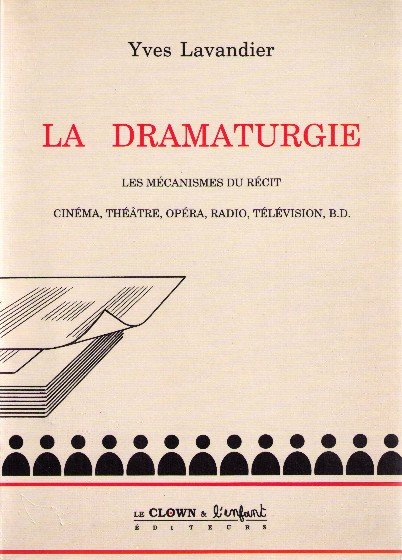
- Author: Yves Lavandier
- Original title: La dramaturgie
- Translator: Bernard Besserglik
- Language: English
- Subject: Screenwriting, storytelling
- Genre: Non-fiction
- Publication date: 1994
- Publication place: France
- English publication date: 2005
- ISBN: 9782910606015

Writing Drama (French: La dramaturgie) is a treatise by French writer and filmmaker Yves Lavandier, originally published in 1994, revised in 1997, 2004, 2008, 2011 and 2014. The English version was translated from the French by Bernard Besserglik and published in 2005. The book exists also in Italian, Spanish and Portuguese.

== Content ==
Writing Drama explores the mechanisms of dramatic story telling. The author makes a clear distinction between what is written to be seen and/or heard (theater, cinema, television, radio, opera and to a lesser extent comic books) and what is written to be read (literature).

The book's principle is the same as Aristotle's Poetics. Yves Lavandier examines works by major scriptwriters and playwrights (Samuel Beckett, Bertolt Brecht, Charles Chaplin, Hergé, Alfred Hitchcock, Henrik Ibsen, Ernst Lubitsch, Molière, Dino Risi, William Shakespeare, Sophocles, Orson Welles, Billy Wilder, etc.) in order to answer three questions:

- what do dramatic works consist of?
- why is this so?
- how does one go about writing them?

The author scans all the tools of dramatic narrative: conflict, protagonist, obstacles, suspense, characterisation, three-act structure, preparation, dramatic irony, comedy, activity, dialogue. A play written by Molière, The School for Wives, and a film directed by Alfred Hitchcock, North by Northwest, are analysed in detail. Several appendices deal with writing for children, drama and literature, short films, documentaries, etc.

In the course of pages, Yves Lavandier develops several governing ideas. According to him:

- Drama preexists theater and film. Life being full of conflicts and ruled by causality, one can say that life is Aristotelian.
- The art of narrative can be taught, like every other human activity.
- It takes two to speak the language of drama: writer and receiver. This is why dramatic irony—which consists in giving the audience an item of information that at least one of the characters is unaware of—is a fundamental mechanism, omnipresent in all genres (tragedy, comedy, melodrama, suspense, thriller, etc.) and all types of narratives.
- All the great storytellers know the rules of narration, at least unconsciously.
- One can respect the rules and take the spectator into account while keeping one's liberty and authenticity.
- Rules are called “recipes” by those who fear or despise them.
- Drama should not be placed in the same basket as literature, Molière and William Shakespeare beside Gustave Flaubert and Franz Kafka.
- Dialogue, in theater or radio, is the visible part of the iceberg. Even in radio, structure and characterisation are paramount.
- Theater is, as well as film, an art of the image.
- To write a good story, three things are needed: conflict, conflict and conflict.
- The spectacular and the sensational are cheap ways to generate emotion and often mingle with voyeurism and omnipotence.
- When an actor is brilliant, he, of course, deserves all the plaudits he gets. But praise is also due to the director who directed him as well as to the writer who created his role in the first place.
- The most powerful language of drama is structure, far before dialogue.
- Nonetheless, the dialogue is inevitable when one tells a human story, even in silent movies where dialogues were numerous, either written on intertitles or guessed by the audience.
- The three-act structure (dramatic acts, not logistical ones) relies simply on a universal triad: before-during-after. One can find the three-act structure in the vast majority of dramatic works, including in a narrative as deconstructed as 21 Grams.
- Suspense should not be mistaken with mystery, Alfred Hitchcock with Agatha Christie.
- Comedy is a noble, useful and difficult treatment. Its lightness is only an appearance, politeness.
- As the mockery of human limitations, comedy may be disparaging but also demanding or compassionate.
- The basics of the narrative are the pattern of a fractal structure.
- TV series are highly respectable and can produce masterpieces of human art such as The Sopranos.
- Children need good drama. To write for children is a wonderful school of narration.
- Writers of drama will always be indispensable and keep on responding to a triple human need of emotion, meaning and distraction.

== Comment ==
Writing Drama is considered a reference textbook amongst European playwrights and scriptwriters.

According to Jacques Audiard, Writing Drama is on par with Aristotle's Poetics. Francis Veber said it is "the most thorough and challenging work of its kind to come out since the birth of scriptwriting". In 2006, Frédéric Beigbeder called Yves Lavandier the "living god of screenwriters".
