= Yes, But... =

2001 film by Yves Lavandier

- Directed by: Yves Lavandier
- Written by: Yves Lavandier
- Produced by: François Kraus; Denis Pineau-Valencienne
- Starring: Gérard Jugnot; Émilie Dequenne
- Cinematography: Pascal Caubère
- Edited by: Dominique Pétrot
- Music by: Philippe Rombi
- Release date: 18 April 2001
- Running time: 104 minutes
- Country: France
- Language: French
- Budget: $2.2 million
- Box office: $840,000

Yes, But... (French: Oui, mais...) is a 2001 French comedy film written and directed by Yves Lavandier, dealing with brief therapy and teenage sexuality.

== Plot ==
Attracted but also frightened by her sexuality, a teenage girl undergoes a brief therapy with a psychotherapist.

== Cast ==
- Émilie Dequenne as Eglantine Laville
- Gérard Jugnot as Erwann Moenner
- Alix de Konopka as Mme Laville
- Cyrille Thouvenin as Sébastien
- Patrick Bonnel as M. Laville
- Vanessa Jarry as Françoise

== Background ==
Yes, But... shows a brief therapy (and not a psychoanalysis) with all its techniques: transactional analysis, gestalt, Ericksonian hypnosis, systemic therapy, paradoxical prescriptions, humor, visualisation.

Richard Fisch, director of the Brief Therapy Center in Palo Alto, called Yes, But... "a gem". Psychotherapist Alan D. Entin says Yes, But... gives a very accurate portrayal of his occupation.
