= Yves Lavandier =

French film writer and director (born 1959)

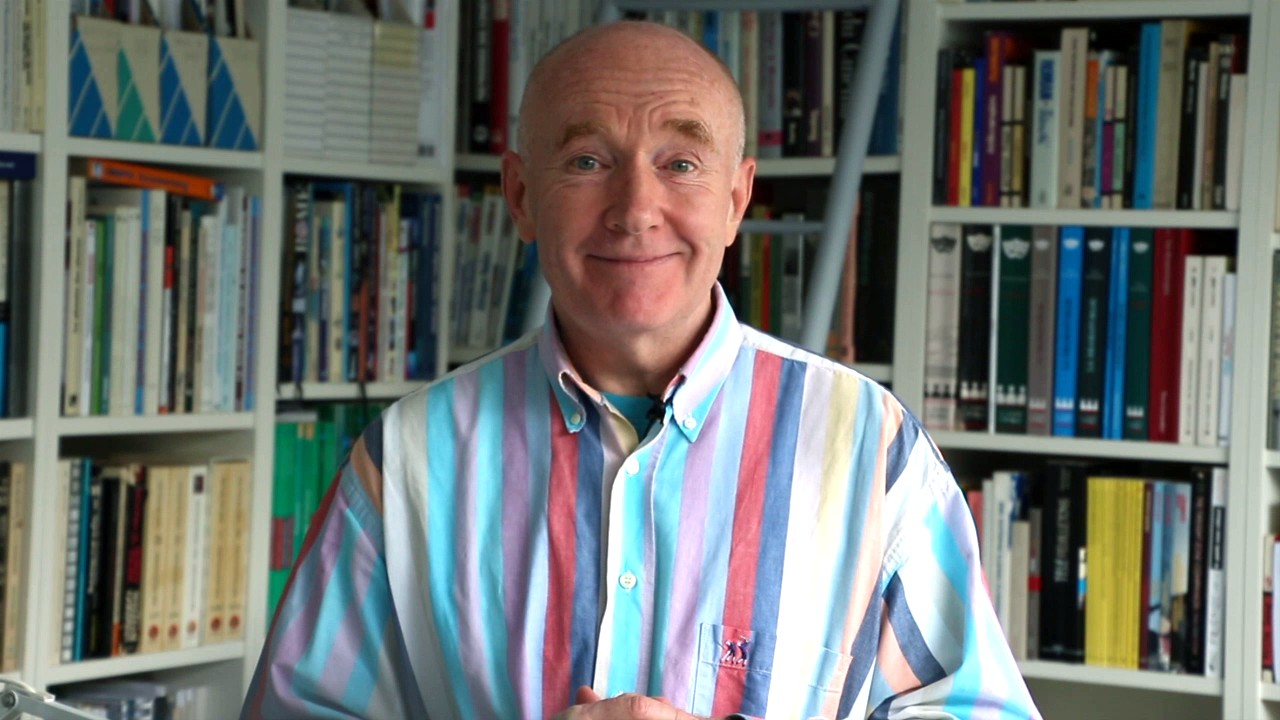
- Yves Lavandier in 2015
- Born: 2 April 1959 (age 67); France
- Education: Columbia University
- Occupations: Film director, Screenwriter, Television writer, Script doctor, Professor, Essayist

Yves Lavandier (born 2 April 1959) is a French film writer and director.

== Biography ==
Yves Lavandier was born on 2 April 1959. After receiving a degree in civil engineering, he studied film at Columbia University, New York, between 1983 and 1985. Miloš Forman, František Daniel, Stefan Sharff, Brad Dourif, Larry Engel and Melina Jelinek were among his teachers. During these two years, he wrote and directed several shorts including Mr. Brown?, The Perverts and Yes Darling. He returned to France in 1985, directed another short, Le scorpion, and embarked on a scriptwriting career mainly for television. He is the creator of an English teaching sitcom called Cousin William.

In addition to his career as scriptwriter, he began to teach screenwriting throughout Europe and published a treatise on the subject titled Writing Drama. For the occasion he founded his own publishing and production company, Le Clown & l'Enfant. Writing Drama is now considered a bible amongst European scriptwriters and playwrights, and Yves Lavandier a renowned script consultant. Among other things, Yves Lavandier is a pitch expert for Dreamago. He is also the author of a screenwriting manual called Constructing a Story.

In March 2015, he launched in English a web series entitled Hats Off to the Screenwriters!, described as a "tribute to the creative people who invent narratives, characters, fictitious worlds, structures and... meaning".

In August and September 2000, he shot his first feature film as writer-director, Yes, But..., which deals with brief therapy and teenage sexuality. It was released in France on 18 April 2001 and won several Audience Awards in festivals around the world.

In 2022, Yves Lavandier published a graphic novel as a writer, entitled L'Institutrice ("The schoolteacher"). The art and color are by Carole Maurel. The story is set in June 1944 in Brittany, two weeks after Operation Overlord has been launched. Marie-Noëlle, the schoolteacher in a tiny Breton village, battles to save a Jewish pupil from the local militia. The publisher is Albin Michel.

In 2025, Yves Lavandier directed a documentary, "1124 oceans", about a humanitarian mission by the NGO ADERC in Cambodia.

Yves Lavandier is married with four children.
