= List of Belgian films of the 2020s =

A list of films produced in Belgium ordered by year of release. For an alphabetical list of Belgian films see Category:Belgian films

== 2020 ==
| English title (original title) | Original language | Director | Cast | Genre | Notes |
|---|---|---|---|---|---|
| Rumba Rules, New Genealogies (Rumba Rules, nouvelles généalogies) | Lingala | Sammy Baloji, David Nadeau-Bernatchez | | Documentary | Belgium-Canada-Democratic Republic of the Congo coproduction |
| Working Girls (Filles de Joie) | French | Frédéric Fonteyne and Anne Paulicevich | Sara Forestier, Noémie Lvovsky, Annabelle Lengronne | Drama | |

== 2021 ==
| English title (original title) | Original language | Director | Cast | Genre | Notes |
|---|---|---|---|---|---|
| Unrelenting (Inexorable) | French | Fabrice du Welz | Benoît Poelvoorde, Mélanie Doutey, Alba Gaïa Bellugi | Thriller | |
| Ferry | Dutch | Cecilia Verheyden | Frank Lammers, Elise Schaap, Huub Stapel | Crime drama | |
| Dealer | Dutch | Jeroen Perceval | Sverre Rous, Ben Segers, Bart Hollanders, Veerle Baetens | Crime Drama | |
| Cool Abdoul | Dutch | Jonas Baeckeland | Nabil Mallat, Anemone Valcke, Johan Heldenbergh, Dimitri Vegas | Biography, Drama | |
| Zero Fucks Given (Rien à foutre) | French | Emmanuel Marre and Julie Lecoustre | Adèle Exarchopoulos | Comedy, Drama | |
| Tori and Lokita (Tori et Lokita) | French | Dardenne brothers | Pablo Schils, Mbundu Joely, Charlotte De Bruyne, Tijmen Govaerts, Alban Ukaj, Marc Zinga | Drama | |
| Playground (Un monde) | French | Laura Wandel | Maya Vanderbeque, Günter Duret, Karim Leklou, Laura Verlinden | Drama | Playground won the FIPRESCI Prize in the Un Certain Regard section at the 2021 Cannes Film Festival |
| Duyster | Dutch | Thomas Vanbrabant, Jordi Ostir | Maïmouna Badjie, Tristan Feyten, Charles De Meester, Stefaan Degand | Horror | Subgenre: found footage |

== 2022 ==
| English title (original title) | Original language | Director | Cast | Genre | Notes |
|---|---|---|---|---|---|
| Zillion | Dutch | Robin Pront | Jonas Vermeulen, Charlotte Timmers, Matteo Simoni | Historical drama, Crime drama | |
| Rebel | French, Dutch | Adil El Arbi, Billal Fallah | Aboubakr Bensaihi, Lubna Azabal, Younes Bouab | Action drama | |
| Close | Dutch, French | Lukas Dhont | Eden Dambrine, Gustav de Waele, Émilie Dequenne, Léa Drucker | Drama | |
| Ritual (Ritueel) | Dutch, French | Hans Herbots | Marie Vinck, Geert Van Rampelberg, Eriq Ebouaney | Thriller | |
| Between Life and Death (Entre La Vie et La Mort) | French | Giordano Gederlini | Antonio de la Torre, Marine Vacth, Olivier Gourmet | Thriller | |
| H4Z4RD | Dutch | Jonas Govaerts, Crystal Lopez | Dimitri Vegas, Jeroen Perceval, Frank Lammers, Jennifer Heylen | Action comedy | |
| Megalomaniac | French | Karim Ouelhaj | Eline Schumacher, Benjamin Ramon, Hélène Moor, Wim Willaert | Horror | |
| Rewind | Dutch | Matthias Temmermans | Céline Dept, Michiel Callebaut, Jean-Romy Manzila, Anaïs Jansen, Louis Thyssen, Imea Denooze, Ayco Weets | Adventure, Comedy | |

== 2023 ==
| English title (original title) | Original language | Director | Cast | Genre | Notes |
|---|---|---|---|---|---|
| Will (Wil) | Dutch, French | Tim Mielants | Stef Aerts, Matteo Simoni, Annelore Crollet, Kevin Janssens | War drama | |
| The Memory Game (Het Geheugenspel) | Dutch | Jan Verheyen, Lien Willaert | Anna Drijver, Gert Winckelmans, Vic de Wachter, Louis Talpe | Thriller, Mystery | |
| Here | French | Bas Devos | Stefan Gota, Liyo Gong, Teodor Corban | Drama | Won the Encounters section at the Berlin International film festival. |
| She Is Conann (Conann) | French | Bertrand Mandico | Claire Duburcq, Christa Théret, Sandra Parfait, Agata Buzek, Nathalie Richard, Elina Löwensohn, Julia Riedler | Action, Fantasy | |
| Turtles (Les Tortues) | French, English | David Lambert | Dave Johns, Olivier Gourmet, Brigitte Poupart | Drama | Belgium-Canada coproduction |
| It Melts (Het Smelt) | Dutch | Veerle Baetens | Charlotte De Bruyne, Spencer Bogaert, Sebastien Dewaele | Drama | |
| Scapegoats (Zondebokken) | Dutch | Rocky Grispen | Ruben Ruette, Mitchell Spruyt, Ilona Dings | Historical drama | |

== 2024 ==
| English title (original title) | Original language | Director | Cast | Genre | Notes |
|---|---|---|---|---|---|
| Night Call (La Nuit Se Traîne) | French | Michiel Blanchart | Jonathan Feltre, Natacha Krief | Thriller | |
| Julie Keeps Quiet (Julie zwijgt) | Dutch, French | Leonardo Van Dijl | Tessa Van den Broeck, Ruth Becquart, Koen De Bouw, Claire Bodson, Laurent Caron | Psychological, Drama | Belgium-Sweden coproduction |
| It's Raining in the House (Il pleut dans la maison) | French | Paloma Sermon-Daï | | | |
| The Last Front | | Julien Hayet-Kerknawi | Iain Glen, Sasha Luss | Epic, Historical drama, Action drama | |

== 2025 ==
| English title (original title) | Original language | Director | Cast | Genre | Notes |
|---|---|---|---|---|---|
| Gangstas (Patsers) | Dutch, French | Adil El Arbi, Billal Fallah | Matteo Simoni, Nora Gharib, Saïd Boumazoughe, Junes Lazaar | Action, Crime | |
| Julian | English, French, Dutch | Cato Kusters | Nina Meurisse, Laurence Roothooft | Drama | |
| Maldoror | French | Fabrice du Welz | Anthony Bajon, Alba Gaïa Bellugi, Alexis Manenti, Laurent Lucas | Crime drama, Thriller | |
| We Believe You | On vous croit | Arnaud Dufeys, Charlotte Devillers | Myriem Akheddiou, Laurent Capelluto | Drama | |
