= Goya Award for Best European Film =

Annual award by the Spanish Film Academy

- Native name: Premio Goya a la mejor película europea
- Awarded for: Best European film of the year
- Country: Spain
- Presented by: Academy of Cinematographic Arts and Sciences of Spain (AACCE)
- First award: 7th Goya Awards (1992)
- Most recent winner: (Norway) Sentimental Value (2025)
- Website: Official website

The Goya Award for Best European Film (Spanish: Premio Goya a la mejor película europea) is one of the Goya Awards presented annually by the Academy of Cinematographic Arts and Sciences of Spain (AACCE) since the 7th edition of the awards in 1992. It is given to honor the Best European film of the year.

For the 39th awards ceremony, the AACCE introduced a modification consisting of the increase of the submissions by a given country up to a maximum of two. For the 41st awards, the AACEE returned again to the limit of one submission per country.

== Winners and nominees ==
The films are listed by the year they received the award or nomination. The winners are in a blue background and in bold. The countries are the ones listed at the official site of the Goya Awards.

=== 1990s ===
Year	English title	Original title	Director(s)	Country
1992 (7th)	**Indochine**		**Régis Wargnier**	**France**
1992 (7th)	Hidden Agenda		Ken Loach	United Kingdom
1992 (7th)	Riff-Raff		Ken Loach	United Kingdom
1993 (8th)	**Three Colors: Blue**	**Trois couleurs: Bleu**	**Krzysztof Kieślowski**	**France**; **Switzerland**; **Poland**
1993 (8th)	The Crying Game		Neil Jordan	United Kingdom
1993 (8th)	Peter's Friends		Kenneth Branagh	United Kingdom
1994 (9th)	**The Snapper**		**Stephen Frears**	**United Kingdom**
1994 (9th)	Raining Stones		Ken Loach	United Kingdom
1994 (9th)	The Remains of the Day		James Ivory	United Kingdom; United States
1995 (10th)	**Lamerica**		**Gianni Amelio**	**Italy**; **France**; **Switzerland**
1995 (10th)	Carrington		Christopher Hampton	United Kingdom
1995 (10th)	The Madness of King George		Nicholas Hytner	United Kingdom
1996 (11th)	**Secrets & Lies**		**Mike Leigh**	**United Kingdom**; **France**
1996 (11th)	Breaking the Waves		Lars von Trier	Denmark
1996 (11th)	Ulysses' Gaze	Το βλέμμα του Οδυσσέα	Theodoros Angelopoulos	Greece; Italy; France
1997 (12th)	**The Full Monty**		**Peter Cattaneo**	**United Kingdom**
1997 (12th)	Brassed Off		Mark Herman	United Kingdom
1997 (12th)	The English Patient		Anthony Minghella	United Kingdom; United States
1998 (13th)	**The Boxer**		**Jim Sheridan**	**Ireland**
1998 (13th)	April	Aprile	Nanni Moretti	Italy
1998 (13th)	Marius and Jeannette	Marius et Jeannette	Robert Guédiguian	France
1998 (13th)	The Thief	Vor	Pavel Chukhrai	Russia; France
1999 (14th)	**Life Is Beautiful**	**La vita è bella**	**Roberto Benigni**	**Italy**
1999 (14th)	Black Cat, White Cat	Црна мачка, бели мачор / Crna mačka, beli mačor	Emir Kusturica	FR Yugoslavia; France; Germany; Austria; Greece
1999 (14th)	The Dinner Game	Le Dîner de Cons	Francis Veber	France
1999 (14th)	It All Starts Today	Ça commence aujourd'hui	Bertrand Tavernier	France

=== 2000s ===
Year	English title	Original title	Director(s)	Country
2000 (15th)	**Dancer in the Dark**		**Lars von Trier**	**Denmark**
2000 (15th)	Chicken Run		Peter Lord and Nick Park	United Kingdom
2000 (15th)	East Is East		Damien O'Donnell	United Kingdom
2000 (15th)	Faithless	Trolösa	Liv Ullmann	Sweden
2001 (16th)	**Amélie**	**Le fabuleux destin d'Amélie Poulain**	**Jean-Pierre Jeunet**	**France**
2001 (16th)	Billy Elliot		Stephen Daldry	United Kingdom
2001 (16th)	Bridget Jones's Diary		Sharon Maguire	United Kingdom
2001 (16th)	Chocolat		Lasse Hallström	United Kingdom
2002 (17th)	**The Pianist**		**Roman Polanski**	**United Kingdom**
2002 (17th)	Italian for Beginners	Italiensk for begyndere	Lone Scherfig	Denmark
2002 (17th)	Mostly Martha	Bella Martha	Sandra Nettelbeck	Germany
2002 (17th)	Gosford Park		Robert Altman	United Kingdom
2003 (18th)	**Good Bye Lenin!**		**Wolfgang Becker**	**Germany**
2003 (18th)	Dogville		Lars von Trier	Denmark; Sweden; United Kingdom
2003 (18th)	The Dreamers		Bernardo Bertolucci	France; United Kingdom
2003 (18th)	The Flower of Evil	La fleur du mal	Claude Chabrol	France
2004 (19th)	**Head-On**	**Gegen die Wand**	**Fatih Akın**	**Germany**
2004 (19th)	Being Julia		István Szabó	United Kingdom; Hungary
2004 (19th)	Girl with a Pearl Earring		Peter Webber	United Kingdom
2004 (19th)	Monsieur Ibrahim	Monsieur Ibrahim et les fleurs du Coran	François Dupeyron	France; Turkey
2005 (20th)	**Match Point**		**Woody Allen**	**United Kingdom**
2005 (20th)	The Chorus	Les choristes	Christophe Barratier	France
2005 (20th)	The Constant Gardener		Fernando Meirelles	United Kingdom
2005 (20th)	Downfall	Der Untergang	Oliver Hirschbiegel	Germany
2006 (21st)	**The Queen**		**Stephen Frears**	**United Kingdom**
2006 (21st)	The Wind That Shakes the Barley		Ken Loach	Ireland; United Kingdom; Germany; Spain
2006 (21st)	Copying Beethoven		Agnieszka Holland	United Kingdom
2006 (21st)	Scoop		Woody Allen	United Kingdom
2007 (22nd)	Not awarded			
2008 (23rd)	**4 Months, 3 Weeks and 2 Days**	**4 luni, 3 saptamani si 2 zile**	**Cristian Mungiu**	**Romania**
2008 (23rd)	The Boy in the Striped Pyjamas		Mark Herman	United Kingdom
2008 (23rd)	The Dark Knight		Christopher Nolan	United Kingdom
2008 (23rd)	The Edge of Heaven	Auf der anderen Seite	Fatih Akın	Germany
2009 (24th)	**Slumdog Millionaire**		**Danny Boyle**	**United Kingdom**
2009 (24th)	Welcome to the Land of Shtis	Bienvenue chez lez Ch'tis	Dany Boon	France
2009 (24th)	The Class	Entre les murs	Laurent Cantet	France
2009 (24th)	Let the Right One In	Låt den rätte komma in	Tomas Alfredson	Sweden

=== 2010s ===
Year	English title	Original title	Director(s)	Country
2010 (25th)	**The King's Speech**		**Tom Hooper**	**United Kingdom**; **Australia**
2010 (25th)	The Ghost Writer		Roman Polanski	France
2010 (25th)	A Prophet	Un prophète	Jacques Audiard	France
2010 (25th)	The White Ribbon	Das weisse Band - Eine deutsche Kindergeschichte	Michael Haneke	Germany
2011 (26th)	**The Artist**		**Michel Hazanavicius**	**France**
2011 (26th)	Jane Eyre		Cary Joji Fukunaga	United Kingdom
2011 (26th)	Melancholia		Lars Von Trier	Denmark
2011 (26th)	Carnage		Roman Polanski	Germany; France; Spain; Poland
2012 (27th)	**The Intouchables**	**Intouchables**	**Olivier Nakache & Éric Toledano**	**France**
2012 (27th)	Shame		Steve McQueen	United Kingdom
2012 (27th)	Rust and Bone	De rouille et d'os	Jacques Audiard	France; Belgium
2012 (27th)	In the House	Dans la maison	François Ozon	France
2013 (28th)	**Amour**		**Michael Haneke**	**Austria**
2013 (28th)	The Hunt	Jagten	Thomas Vinterberg	Denmark; Sweden
2013 (28th)	The Great Beauty	La grande bellezza	Paolo Sorrentino	Italy; France
2013 (28th)	Blue Is the Warmest Colour	La Vie d'Adèle	Abdellatif Kechiche	France; Belgium; Spain
2014 (29th)	**Ida**		**Paweł Pawlikowski**	**Poland**
2014 (29th)	The Salt of the Earth		Wim Wenders & Juliano Ribeiro Salgado	France
2014 (29th)	Serial (Bad) Weddings	Qu'est-ce qu'on a fait au Bon Dieu ?	Philippe de Chauveron	France
2014 (29th)	The Hundred-Year-Old Man Who Climbed Out the Window and Disappeared	Hundraåringen som klev ut genom fönstret och försvann	Felix Herngren	Sweden
2015 (30th)	**Mustang**		**Deniz Gamze Ergüven**	**France**
2015 (30th)	Sur le chemin de l'école		Pascal Plisson	France
2015 (30th)	Leviathan	Левиафан	Andrey Zvyagintsev	Russia
2015 (30th)	Macbeth		Justin Kurzel	United Kingdom
2016 (31st)	**Elle**		**Paul Verhoeven**	**France**
2016 (31st)	Genius		Michael Grandage	United Kingdom
2016 (31st)	Son of Saul	Saul fia	László Nemes	Hungary
2016 (31st)	I, Daniel Blake		Ken Loach	United Kingdom
2017 (32nd)	**The Square**		**Ruben Östlund**	**Sweden**
2017 (32nd)	C'est la vie!	Le Sens de la fête	Éric Toledano and Olivier Nakache	France
2017 (32nd)	Lady Macbeth		William Oldroyd	United Kingdom
2017 (32nd)	Toni Erdmann		Maren Ade	Germany
2018 (33rd)	**Cold War**	**Zimna wojna**	**Paweł Pawlikowski**	**Poland**
2018 (33rd)	Phantom Thread		Paul Thomas Anderson	United Kingdom
2018 (33rd)	Girl		Lukas Dhont	Belgium
2018 (33rd)	The Party		Sally Potter	United Kingdom
2019 (34th)	**Les Misérables**		**Ladj Ly**	**France**
2019 (34th)	Border	Gräns	Ali Abbasi	Sweden
2019 (34th)	Portrait of a Lady on Fire	Portrait de la jeune fille en feu	Céline Sciamma	France
2019 (34th)	Yesterday		Danny Boyle	United Kingdom

=== 2020s ===
Year	English title	Original title	Director(s)	Country
2020 (35th)	**The Father**		**Florian Zeller**	**United Kingdom**
2020 (35th)	Corpus Christi	Boże Ciało	Jan Komasa	Poland
2020 (35th)	An Officer and a Spy	J'accuse	Roman Polanski	France
2020 (35th)	Falling		Viggo Mortensen	United Kingdom
2021 (36th)	**Another Round**	**Druk**	**Thomas Vinterberg**	**Denmark**
2021 (36th)	Bye Bye Morons	Adieu les cons	Albert Dupontel	France
2021 (36th)	Promising Young Woman		Emerald Fennell	United Kingdom
2021 (36th)	I'm Your Man	Ich bin dein Mensch	Maria Schrader	Germany
2022 (37th)	**The Worst Person in the World**	**Verdens verste menneske**	**Joachim Trier**	**Norway**
2022 (37th)	Belfast		Kenneth Branagh	United Kingdom
2022 (37th)	The Hand of God	È stata la mano di Dio	Paolo Sorrentino	Italy
2022 (37th)	Lost Illusions	Illusions perdues	Xavier Giannoli	France
2022 (37th)	Playground	Un monde	Laura Wandel	Belgium
2023 (38th)	**Anatomy of a Fall**	**Anatomie d'une chute**	**Justine Triet**	**France**
2023 (38th)	Aftersun		Charlotte Wells	United Kingdom
2023 (38th)	The Eight Mountains	Le otto montagne	Felix van Groeningen, Charlotte Vandermeersch	Italy
2023 (38th)	Safe Place	Sigurno mjesto	Juraj Lerotić	Croatia
2023 (38th)	The Teachers' Lounge	Das Lehrerzimmer	İlker Çatak	Germany
2024 (39th)	**Emilia Pérez**		**Jacques Audiard**	**France**
2024 (39th)	The Count of Monte Cristo	Le Comte de Monte-Cristo	Matthieu Delaporte, Alexandre de La Patellière	France
2024 (39th)	Flow	Straume	Gints Zilbalodis	Latvia
2024 (39th)	La chimera		Alice Rohrwacher	Italy
2024 (39th)	The Zone of Interest		Jonathan Glazer	United Kingdom
2025 (40th)	**Sentimental Value**	**Affeksjonsverdi**	**Joachim Trier**	**Norway**
2025 (40th)	Conclave		Edward Berger	United Kingdom
2025 (40th)	The Girl with the Needle	Pigen med nålen	Magnus von Horn	Denmark
2025 (40th)	On Falling		Laura Carreira	Portugal
2025 (40th)	It Was Just an Accident	Un simple accident	Jafar Panahi	France

== Awards by nation ==
The following list excludes non-European countries that have received nominations for co-productions with European country. The list also excludes Spain.

Country	Awards	Nominations
France	12	38
United Kingdom	9	47
Poland	3	5
Germany	2	12
Italy	2	7
Denmark	2	6
Switzerland	2	2
Sweden	1	7
Austria	1	2
Ireland	1	2
Romania	1	1
Norway	1	1
Belgium	0	4
Greece	0	2
Russia	0	2
Hungary	0	2
FR Yugoslavia	0	1
Turkey	0	1
Croatia	0	1
Latvia	0	1
