= Magritte Award for Best Supporting Actor =

Belgian film award

- Presented by: Académie André Delvaux
- First award: 2011
- Currently held by: Gilles Remiche, Madly in Life (2021)
- Website: lesmagritteducinema.com

The Magritte Award for Best Supporting Actor (French: Magritte du meilleur acteur dans un second rôle) is an award presented annually by the Académie André Delvaux. It is given in honor of an actor who has delivered an outstanding performance in a supporting role while working within the film industry. It is one of the Magritte Awards, which were established to recognize excellence in Belgian cinematic achievements.

The 1st Magritte Awards ceremony was held in 2011 with Jan Decleir receiving the award for his role in The Barons. As of the 2022 ceremony, Gilles Remiche is the most recent winner in this category for his role in Madly in Life.

== Winners and nominees ==
In the list below, winners are listed first in the colored row, followed by the other nominees.

=== 2010s ===
Year	Actor	English title	Original title
2010 (1st)	Jan Decleir	The Barons	Les Barons
2010 (1st)	Laurent Capelluto	OSS 117: Lost in Rio	OSS 117: Rio ne répond plus
2010 (1st)	François Damiens	Heartbreaker	L'Arnacœur
2010 (1st)	Benoît Poelvoorde	Coco Before Chanel	Coco avant Chanel
2010 (1st)	Yannick Renier	Private Lessons	Élève libre
2011 (2nd)	Jérémie Renier	Potiche	
2011 (2nd)	Laurent Capelluto	The Long Falling	Où va la nuit
2011 (2nd)	Bouli Lanners	Kill Me Please	
2011 (2nd)	Didier Toupy	The Giants	Les Géants
2012 (3rd)	Bouli Lanners	Rust and Bone	De rouille et d'os
2012 (3rd)	Jean-Luc Couchard	Dead Man Talking	
2012 (3rd)	Dieudonné Kabongo	The Invader	L'envahisseur
2012 (3rd)	Denis Mpunga	Dead Man Talking	
2013 (4th)	Laurent Capelluto	Just a Sigh	Le Temps de l'aventure
2013 (4th)	Olivier Gourmet	Grand Central	
2013 (4th)	Bouli Lanners	11.6	
2013 (4th)	David Murgia	I Am a Standard Supporter	Je suis supporter du Standard
2013 (4th)	Renaud Rutten	A Song for My Mother	Une chanson pour ma mère
2014 (5th)	Jérémie Renier	Saint Laurent	
2014 (5th)	François Damiens	Suzanne	
2014 (5th)	Olivier Gourmet	The Marchers	La Marche
2014 (5th)	David Murgia	I'll Bury You	Je te survivrai
2015 (6th)	Laurent Capelluto	The Clearstream Affair	L'Enquête
2015 (6th)	Arno Hintjens	Prejudice	
2015 (6th)	David Murgia	The Brand New Testament	Le Tout Nouveau Testament
2015 (6th)	Marc Zinga	Dheepan	
2016 (7th)	David Murgia	The First, the Last	Les Premiers, les Derniers
2016 (7th)	Laurent Capelluto	I Am a Soldier	Je suis un soldat
2016 (7th)	Charlie Dupont	Odd Job	Un petit boulot
2016 (7th)	Sam Louwyck	Keeper	
2017 (8th)	Jean-Benoît Ugeux	Racer and the Jailbird	Le Fidèle
2017 (8th)	Laurent Capelluto	Don't Tell Her	Faut pas lui dire
2017 (8th)	Patrick Descamps	This Is Our Land	Chez nous
2017 (8th)	David Murgia	Blind Spot	Dode Hoek
2018 (9th)	Arieh Worthalter	Girl	
2018 (9th)	Yoann Blanc	The Benefit of the Doubt	Une Part d'ombre
2018 (9th)	Bouli Lanners	Above the Law	Tueurs
2018 (9th)	Pierre Nisse	Let the Corpses Tan	Laissez bronzer les cadavres
2019 (10th)	Arieh Worthalter	Mothers' Instinct	Duelles
2019 (10th)	Othmane Moumen	Young Ahmed	Le Jeune Ahmed
2019 (10th)	Bouli Lanners	Patrick	De Patrick
2019 (10th)	Jonathan Zaccaï	Sink or Swim	Le Grand Bain

=== 2020s ===
Year	Actor	English title	Original title
2020/21 (11th)	Gilles Remiche	Madly in Life	Une vie démente
2020/21 (11th)	Patrick Descamps	The Restless	Les Intranquilles
2020/21 (11th)	Sam Louwyck	Jumbo	
2020/21 (11th)	Benoît Poelvoorde	Adoration	
2022 (12th)	Igor Van Dessel	Close	
2022 (12th)	Mehdi Dehbi	Boy from Heaven	Sabiyy min al Janna
2022 (12th)	Jérémie Renier	November	Novembre
2022 (12th)	Tijmen Govaerts	Tori and Lokita	Tori et Lokita
2023 (13th)	Arieh Worthalter	All to Play For	Rien à perdre
2023 (13th)	Philippe Résimont	Employee of the Month	L'Employée du mois
2023 (13th)	Jean-Benoît Ugeux	Last Dance	
2023 (13th)	Peter Van Den Begin	Employee of the Month	L'Employée du mois
2024 (14th)	Jonas Bloquet	Night Call	La nuit se traîne
2024 (14th)	Thomas Mustin	Night Call	La nuit se traîne
2024 (14th)	Benoît Poelvoorde	Beating Hearts	L'Amour ouf
2024 (14th)	Fabrizio Rongione	Amal	
2025 (15th)	Laurent Capelluto	We Believe You	On vous croit
2025 (15th)	François Bastin	Vitrival – The Most Beautiful Village in the World	
2025 (15th)	Thomas Coumans	Kika	
2025 (15th)	David Murgia	Maldoror	
