= Adoration (2019 film) =

2019 film directed by Fabrice Du Welz

- Film poster
- Directed by: Fabrice Du Welz
- Written by: Fabrice du Welz; Romain Protat; Vincent Tavier
- Produced by: Manuel Chiche; Vincent Tavier
- Starring: Thomas Gioria; Benoît Poelvoorde; Mehdi Nebbou; Fantine Harduin
- Cinematography: Manuel Dacosse
- Edited by: Anne-Laure Guégan
- Music by: Vincent Cahay
- Release dates: 16 August 2019 (Locarno); 15 January 2020 (Belgium)
- Running time: 98 minutes
- Countries: Belgium; France
- Languages: French; Dutch

Adoration is a 2019 Belgian-French thriller film directed by Fabrice Du Welz and starring Thomas Gioria, Benoît Poelvoorde, and Fantine Harduin. It was written by Du Welz with Vincent Tavier and Romain Protat. The film premiered at the 2019 Locarno Film Festival.

It received the André Cavens Award for Best Film given by the Belgian Film Critics Association (UCC). At the 11th Magritte Awards, Adoration received six nominations, including Best Film and Best Screenplay for Du Welz.

== Cast ==
- Thomas Gioria as Paul
- Benoît Poelvoorde as Hinkel
- Fantine Harduin as Gloria
- Anaël Snoek as Simone
- Gwendolyn Gourvenec as Doctor Loisel
- Peter Van Den Begin as Oscar Batts
- Laurent Lucas as Gloria's uncle
- Martha Canga Antonio as Jeanne
- Sandor Funtek as Lucien

== Response ==
=== Critical reception ===
The film has received positive reviews and has an approval rating of 93% on Rotten Tomatoes, with an average rating of 7.1/10 based on 15 reviews.

=== Accolades ===
Award / Film Festival	Category	Recipients and nominees	Result
Belgian Film Critics Association	Best Film		Won
Locarno Film Festival	Variety Piazza Grande Award		Nominated
Magritte Awards	Best Film		Nominated
Magritte Awards	Best Director	Fabrice Du Welz	Nominated
Magritte Awards	Best Supporting Actor	Benoît Poelvoorde	Nominated
Magritte Awards	Most Promising Actress	Fantine Harduin	Nominated
Magritte Awards	Best Cinematography	Manuel Dacosse	Nominated
Magritte Awards	Best Original Score	Vincent Cahay	Won
Méliès Award	Best European Fantastic Feature Film		Nominated
Montréal Festival of New Cinema	Best Film		Nominated
Odesa International Film Festival	Best Film		Nominated
Odesa International Film Festival	Best Director	Fabrice Du Welz	Won
Sitges Film Festival	Best Film		Nominated
Sitges Film Festival	Best Cinematography	Manuel Dacosse	Won
Sitges Film Festival	Special Jury Prize	Fabrice Du Welz	Won
Sitges Film Festival	Best European Fantastic Feature Film		Won
Sitges Film Festival	Special Mention	Thomas Gioria and Fantine Harduin	Won
