= Magritte Award for Best Screenplay =

Belgian film award

- Presented by: Académie André Delvaux
- First award: 2011
- Currently held by: Charlotte Devillers and Arnaud Dufeys, We Believe You (2025)
- Website: lesmagritteducinema.com

The Magritte Award for Best Screenplay (French: Magritte du meilleur scénario original ou adaptation) is an award presented annually by the Académie André Delvaux. It is one of the Magritte Awards, which were established to recognize excellence in Belgian cinematic achievements.

The 1st Magritte Awards ceremony was held in 2011 with Jaco Van Dormael receiving the award for his work in Mr. Nobody. As of the 2026 ceremony, Charlotte Devillers and Arnaud Dufeys are the most recent winners in this category for their work in We Believe You.

== Winners and nominees ==
In the list below, winners are listed first in the colored row, followed by the other nominees.

=== 2010s ===
Year	English title	Original title	Screenwriter(s)
2010 (1st)	Mr. Nobody		Jaco Van Dormael
2010 (1st)	The Barons	Les Barons	Nabil Ben Yadir and Laurent Brandenbourger with Sébastien Fernandez
2010 (1st)	Illegal	Illégal	Olivier Masset-Depasse
2010 (1st)	Private Lessons	Élève libre	Joachim Lafosse and François Pirot
2011 (2nd)	Bullhead	Rundskop	Michael R. Roskam
2011 (2nd)	The Giants	Les Géants	Bouli Lanners and Elise Ancion
2011 (2nd)	The Kid with a Bike	Le Gamin au vélo	Jean-Pierre and Luc Dardenne
2011 (2nd)	Romantics Anonymous	Les Émotifs anonymes	Philippe Blasband
2012 (3rd)	One Night	38 témoins	Lucas Belvaux
2012 (3rd)	Dead Man Talking		Patrick Ridremont
2012 (3rd)	Mobile Home		François Pirot
2012 (3rd)	Our Children	À perdre la raison	Joachim Lafosse
2013 (4th)	Tango libre		Philippe Blasband and Anne Paulicevich
2013 (4th)	Kid		Fien Troch
2013 (4th)	The Fifth Season	La Cinquième Saison	Peter Brosens and Jessica Woodworth
2013 (4th)	Vijay and I		Philippe Blasband and Sam Garbarski
2014 (5th)	Not My Type	Pas son genre	Lucas Belvaux
2014 (5th)	Henri		Yolande Moreau
2014 (5th)	The Marchers	La Marche	Nabil Ben Yadir
2014 (5th)	Two Days, One Night	Deux jours, une nuit	Jean-Pierre and Luc Dardenne
2015 (6th)	The Brand New Testament	Le Tout Nouveau Testament	Jaco Van Dormael and Thomas Gunzig
2015 (6th)	Alleluia		Fabrice Du Welz and Vincent Tavier
2015 (6th)	I'm Dead But I Have Friends	Je suis mort mais j'ai des amis	Guillaume Malandrin and Stéphane Malandrin
2015 (6th)	Prejudice	Préjudice	Antoine Cuypers and Antoine Wauters
2016 (7th)	Death by Death	Je me tue à le dire	Xavier Seron
2016 (7th)	After Love	L'Économie du couple	Joachim Lafosse
2016 (7th)	The First, the Last	Les Premiers, les Derniers	Bouli Lanners
2016 (7th)	Keeper		Guillaume Senez and David Lambert
2017 (8th)	Insyriated		Philippe Van Leeuw
2017 (8th)	King of the Belgians		Peter Brosens and Jessica Woodworth
2017 (8th)	This Is Our Land	Chez nous	Lucas Belvaux
2017 (8th)	A Wedding	Noces	Stephan Streker
2018 (9th)	Girl		Lukas Dhont and Angelo Tijssens
2018 (9th)	Bitter Flowers		Olivier Meys and Maarten Loix
2018 (9th)	Bye Bye Germany	Es war einmal in Deutschland...	Sam Garbarski
2018 (9th)	Our Struggles	Nos batailles	Guillaume Senez
2019 (10th)	Mothers' Instinct	Duelles	Olivier Masset-Depasse
2019 (10th)	Lola	Lola vers la mer	Laurent Micheli
2019 (10th)	Our Mothers	Nuestras madres	César Díaz
2019 (10th)	Young Ahmed	Le Jeune Ahmed	Jean-Pierre and Luc Dardenne

=== 2020s ===
Year	English title	Original title	Screenwriter(s)
2020/21 (11th)	Madly in Life	Une vie démente	Ann Sirot and Raphaël Balboni
2020/21 (11th)	Playground	Un monde	Laura Wandel
2020/21 (11th)	The Restless	Les Intranquilles	Joachim Lafosse
2020/21 (11th)	Working Girls	Filles de joie	Anne Paulicevich
2022 (12th)	Close		Lukas Dhont and Angelo Tijssens
2022 (12th)	Animals		Nabil Ben Yadir and Antoine Cuypers
2022 (12th)	Nobody Has to Know		Bouli Lanners
2022 (12th)	Zero Fucks Given	Rien à foutre	Julie Lecoustre and Emmanuel Marre
2023 (13th)	Love According to Dalva	Dalva	Emmanuelle Nicot
2023 (13th)	The Experience of Love	Le Syndrome des amours passées	Ann Sirot and Raphaël Balboni
2023 (13th)	The Lost Boys	Le Paradis	Zeno Graton
2023 (13th)	Omen	Augure	Baloji
2024 (14th)	Night Call	La nuit se traîne	Michiel Blanchart
2024 (14th)	Amal		Jawad Rhalib, David Lambert, and Chloé Léonil
2024 (14th)	Life's a Bitch	Chiennes de vie	Xavier Seron
2024 (14th)	Through the Night	Quitter la nuit	Delphine Girard
2025 (15th)	We Believe You	On vous croit	Charlotte Devillers and Arnaud Dufeys
2025 (15th)	Adam's Interest	L'intérêt d'Adam	Laura Wandel
2025 (15th)	Kika		Alexe Poukine and Thomas Van Zuylen
2025 (15th)	Young Mothers	Jeunes mères	Jean-Pierre and Luc Dardenne
