= Night of the Consumers =

Upcoming video game

- Developer: Germfood
- Publisher: Germfood
- Engine: Unity
- Platform: Windows
- Release: Early access; WW: March 7, 2020
- Genres: Survival horror, simulation
- Mode: Single-player

Night of the Consumers is an upcoming survival horror simulation game developed and published by indie game developer Germfood. The player character is a newly-hired grocery store employee who must restock all empty shelves before time runs out. Aggressive, zombie-like customers throughout the store will sprint toward the player to ask for help finding products; the player will be fired, resulting in a game over, if customers are not helped in time or properly.

Night of the Consumers was released for early access on March 7, 2020 and is scheduled to be officially released on Steam. It has low poly graphics inspired by PS1 games. Critics reviewed its early access version positively for its accurate depiction of working in retail and its aesthetic.

== Gameplay ==
The player takes the role of a new hiree at a grocery store tasked with restocking its shelves before it closes, which is indicated by a timer in the lower-right corner of the screen, all while assisting aggressive, zombie-like customers with their requests.

The player must carry boxes scattered around the store to one of 16 corresponding aisles, as labeled on the boxes, and drag each product inside onto an empty shelf. They can be interrupted by customers who appear throughout the store and, upon seeing the player, will lock onto and sprint toward them to ask for their help finding a product, or, in the case of one customer, her missing baby. If a customer reaches the player, they must quickly walk them to the aisle with the desired product, or, if it is the mother customer, find and pick up her baby to bring it back to her. Customers can be stunned by throwing boxes at them and will stop chasing the player if they hide in one of the store's four "staff only" rooms. The player can also sprint and, while stocking shelves, can look over their shoulders to monitor for nearby customers.

If the player fails to help a customer in time or brings a customer to the wrong aisle three times in a row, they will ask to speak to a manager. In both cases, or if the player does not stock each empty shelf before the store closes, they will be fired: the store will go dark and the store manager will chase after them, grab them, and yell, "Fired!", indicating a game over.

== Plot ==
The player begins in the locker room of the grocery store, where they meet the manager, who tells them they are late and instructs them to go to longtime employee Jimmy for training. Jimmy runs through a "staff-only" door to escape a horde of customers chasing after him, vomits on the floor, and announces to the player that he is quitting due to the stress of the job. He leaves the player a book with tips on how to survive the job before running off. After the player completes their first shift, the game ends with the manager complimenting their passion for the job and suggesting that they may be up for employee of the month if they continue their good work.

== Development and release ==
Night of the Consumers features low poly, PS1-inspired graphics. It was developed by indie game developer Germfood. An early access version was released in March 2020. It was later included in Itch.io's Bundle for Racial Justice and Equality, which included 1,741 games and was released for $5 in June 2020. The bundle's proceeds of $8 million went toward the NAACP Legal Defense and Educational Fund and the Community Bail Fund. Germfood tweeted in August 2024 that the full game would be released in October 2024. It was later set to be released on Steam on July 11, 2025.

The game went viral on social media following its release and appeared in popular Let's Plays by YouTubers Markiplier and CoryxKenshin.

== Reception ==
=== Critical reviews ===
Rock Paper Shotgun's Sin Vega wrote that the game was "quick and rewarding" and praised its accurate depiction of the "sheer irritation" of working in the service industry and its "difficult balance" of making the customers irritating without making the game itself irritating. For PC Gamer, Steven Messner wrote that the game "perfectly" captured the "anxiety and dread" of dealing with "the revolving door of rude customers" while working in retail and that he "love[d]" the "unsettling game of cat and mouse".

Zoey Handley, writing for Destructoid, called Night of the Consumers a "strangely enjoyable" and "rather striking product" bolstered by its "sense of humor", "unsettling lo-fi art style", and "good use of audio and visual cues". Oisin Kuhnke of NME wrote that the game was "fluid and fast-paced" and "a great example" of a PS1-style horror game that "expand[s] upon aesthetic choices in ways that weren't possible on earlier hardware". Night of the Consumers was included on Game Rant's list of the best horror games set in stores, with Rachael Phillips calling it "an effective parody of the horrors of retail".

Ian Levinstein of Engadget criticized the game's controls as its "biggest stumbling block" and its first-person perspective and fast pace as unsuitable for those "susceptible to dizziness", but praised it for its aesthetic and for the customers effectively evoking "bloodthirsty zombies". Jody Macgregor of PC Gamer identified Night of the Consumers as one of several PS1–inspired horror games that "lean[s] into the uncanny" and "hark[s] back to a time when the FPS genre was also new enough to feel odd and threatening".
