= 11th Magritte Awards =

2022 Belgian film awards ceremony

- Official poster
- Date: 12 February 2022
- Site: Square; Mont des Arts, Brussels, Belgium
- Produced by: Leslie Cable; Tanguy Cortier
- Directed by: Benoît Vlietinck

Highlights
- Best Film: Madly in Life
- Most awards: Madly in Life and Playground (7)
- Most nominations: Madly in Life (12)

Television coverage
- Network: RTBF

The 11th Magritte Awards ceremony, presented by the Académie André Delvaux, honored the best films of 2020 and 2021 in Belgium. It took place on 12 February 2022, at the Square, in the historic site of Mont des Arts, Brussels. It was the first ceremony in two years after the 2021 event was cancelled due to the COVID-19 pandemic. During the ceremony, the Académie André Delvaux presented Magritte Awards in 23 categories. The ceremony, televised in Belgium by La Trois, was produced by Leslie Cable and Tanguy Cortier and was directed by Benoît Vlietinck. Film director Thierry Michel presided the ceremony, while comedians Laurence Bibot, Dena, Ingrid Heiderscheidt, Achille Ridolfi and Bwanga Pilipili co-hosted the show.

The nominees for the 11th Magritte Awards were announced on 12 January 2022. Films with the most nominations were Madly in Life with twelve, followed by Playground with ten, and Adoration and The Restless with six. The winners were announced during the awards ceremony on 12 February 2022. Madly in Life won seven awards, including Best Film. Other multiple winners were Playground with seven awards and Titane with two.

== Winners and nominees ==
=== Best Film ===
- Madly in Life (Une vie démente)
  - Adoration
  - Playground (Un monde)
  - The Restless (Les Intranquilles)
  - Working Girls (Filles de joie)

=== Best Director ===
- Laura Wandel – Playground (Un monde)
  - Fabrice Du Welz – Adoration
  - Joachim Lafosse – The Restless (Les Intranquilles)
  - Ann Sirot and Raphaël Balboni – Madly in Life (Une vie démente)

=== Best Actor ===
- Jean Le Peltier – Madly in Life (Une vie démente)
  - Bouli Lanners – Love Song for Tough Guys (Cette musique ne joue pour personne)
  - Jérémie Renier – Slalom
  - Arieh Worthalter – Hold Me Tight (Serre moi fort)

=== Best Actress ===
- Jo Deseure – Madly in Life (Une vie démente)
  - Lubna Azabal – Adam
  - Lucie Debay – Madly in Life (Une vie démente)
  - Virginie Efira – Bye Bye Morons (Adieu les cons)

=== Best Supporting Actor ===
- Gilles Remiche – Madly in Life (Une vie démente)
  - Patrick Descamps – The Restless (Les Intranquilles)
  - Sam Louwyck – Jumbo
  - Benoît Poelvoorde – Adoration

=== Best Supporting Actress ===
- Laura Verlinden – Playground (Un monde)
  - Myriem Akheddiou – Titane
  - Claire Bodson – Mother Schmuckers (Fils de plouc)
  - Émilie Dequenne – Love Affair(s) (Les choses qu'on dit, les choses qu'on fait)

=== Most Promising Actor ===
- Günter Duret – Playground (Un monde)
  - Roméo Elvis – Mandibles (Mandibules)
  - Basile Grunberger – SpaceBoy
  - Yoann Zimmer – Home Front (Des hommes)

=== Most Promising Actress ===
- Maya Vanderbeque – Playground (Un monde)
  - Salomé Dewaels – Lost Illusions (Illusions perdues)
  - Fantine Harduin – Adoration
  - Daphné Patakia – Benedetta

=== Best Screenplay ===
- Madly in Life (Une vie démente) – Ann Sirot and Raphaël Balboni
  - Playground (Un monde) – Laura Wandel
  - The Restless (Les Intranquilles) – Joachim Lafosse
  - Working Girls (Filles de joie) – Anne Paulicevich

=== Best First Feature Film ===
- Playground (Un monde)
  - Jumbo
  - Madly in Life (Une vie démente)
  - Mother Schmuckers (Fils de plouc)

=== Best Flemish Film ===
- La Civil
  - The Barefoot Emperor
  - Dealer
  - Rookie

=== Best Foreign Film in Coproduction ===
- Titane
  - Adam
  - The Man Who Sold His Skin
  - Onoda: 10,000 Nights in the Jungle (Onoda, 10 000 nuits dans la jungle)

=== Best Cinematography ===
- Titane – Ruben Impens
  - Adoration – Manuel Dacosse
  - Playground (Un monde) – Frédéric Noirhomme

=== Best Production Design ===
- Madly in Life (Une vie démente) – Lisa Etienne
  - The Restless (Les Intranquilles) – Anna Falguères
  - Titane – Laurie Colson and Lise Péault

=== Best Costume Design ===
- Madly in Life (Une vie démente) – Frédérick Denis
  - Our Men (Mon légionnaire) – Catherine Cosme
  - Working Girls (Filles de joie) – Ann Lauwerys

=== Best Original Score ===
- Adoration – Vincent Cahay
  - My Voice Will Be with You (Ma voix t'accompagnera) – Loup Mormont
  - Rookie – DAAN

=== Best Sound ===
- Playground (Un monde) – Mathieu Cox, Corinne Dubien, Thomas Grimm-Landsberg, David Vranken
  - Madly in Life (Une vie démente) – Bruno Schweisguth, Julien Mizac, Philippe Charbonnel
  - Titane – Séverin Favriau, Fabrice Osinski, Stéphane Thiébaut

=== Best Editing ===
- Playground (Un monde) – Nicolas Rumpl
  - Madly in Life (Une vie démente) – Sophie Vercruysse and Raphaël Balboni
  - The Restless (Les Intranquilles) – Marie-Hélène Dozo

=== Best Fiction Short Film ===
- Squish (Sprötch) – Xavier Seron
  - The Salamander Child (L'enfant salamandre) – Théo Degen
  - Titan – Valéry Carnoy
  - You're Dead Hélène (T'es morte Hélène) – Michiel Blanchart

=== Best Animated Short Film ===
- And Yet We're Not Superheroes (On est pas près d'être des super héros) – Lia Bertels
  - Amours Libres – Emily Worms
  - Le Quatuor à cornes : là-haut sur la montagne – Benjamin Botella and Arnaud Demuynck
  - Tête de linotte ! – Gaspar Chabaud

=== Best Documentary Film ===
- Petit Samedi – Paloma Sermon-Daï
  - #salepute – Florence Hainaut and Myriam Leroy
  - Chasing the Dragons (Chasser les dragons) – Alexandra Kandy-Longuet
  - My Voice Will Be with You (Ma voix t'accompagnera) – Bruno Tracq

=== Best Documentary Short Film ===
- Mother's – Hippolyte Leibovici
  - Belgium-20 – Jean-Benoît Ugeux
  - Juliette the Great – Alice Khol
  - Maîtresse – Linda Ibbari

=== Honorary Magritte Award ===
- Marion Hänsel

== Films with multiple nominations and awards ==
The following eleven films received multiple nominations.

- Twelve: Madly in Life
- Ten: Playground
- Six: Adoration, The Restless
- Five: Titane
- Three: Working Girls
- Two: Adam, Jumbo, Mother Schmuckers, My Voice Will Be with You, Rookie

The following three films received multiple awards.

- Seven: Madly in Life, Playground
- Two: Titane

== See also ==
- 2021 in film
- Impact of the COVID-19 pandemic on cinema
- 47th César Awards
- 27th Lumières Awards
