= Magritte Award for Best Production Design =

Belgian film award

- Presented by: Académie André Delvaux
- First award: 2011
- Currently held by: Laurie Colson, Reflection in a Dead Diamond (2025)
- Website: lesmagritteducinema.com

The Magritte Award for Best Production Design (French: Magritte des meilleurs décors) is an award presented annually by the Académie André Delvaux. It is one of the Magritte Awards, which were established to recognize excellence in Belgian cinematic achievements.

The 1st Magritte Awards ceremony was held in 2011 with Eric Blesin and Marc Nis receiving the award for their work in A Town Called Panic. As of the 2022 ceremony, Lisa Etienne is the most recent winner in this category for her work in Madly in Life.

== Winners and nominees ==
In the list below, winners are listed first in the colored row, followed by the other nominees.

=== 2010s ===
Year	English title	Original title	Interior decorator(s)
2010 (1st)	A Town Called Panic	Panique au village	Eric Blesin and Marc Nis
2010 (1st)	The Barons	Les Barons	Mohammed Ayada
2010 (1st)	Illegal	Illégal	Patrick Dechesne and Alain-Pascal Housiaux
2011 (2nd)	A Distant Neighborhood	Quartier lointain	Véronique Sacrez
2011 (2nd)	The Giants	Les Géants	Paul Rouschop
2011 (2nd)	The Kid with a Bike	Le Gamin au vélo	Igor Gabriel
2011 (2nd)	The Pack	La Meute	Eugénie Collet and Florence Vercheval
2012 (3rd)	Dead Man Talking		Alina Santos
2012 (3rd)	The Invader	L'envahisseur	Françoise Joset
2012 (3rd)	Almayer's Folly	La Folie Almayer	Patrick Dechesne and Alain-Pascal Housiaux
2013 (4th)	Tango libre		Véronique Sacrez
2013 (4th)	Mood Indigo	L'Écume des jours	Pierre Renson
2013 (4th)	The Fifth Season	La Cinquième Saison	Igor Gabriel
2014 (5th)	Marina		Hubert Pouille
2014 (5th)	The Strange Color of Your Body's Tears	L'Étrange Couleur des larmes de ton corps	Julia Irribarria
2014 (5th)	Two Days, One Night	Deux jours, une nuit	Igor Gabriel
2015 (6th)	Alleluia		Emmanuel de Meulemeester
2015 (6th)	All Cats Are Grey	Tous les chats sont gris	Paul Rouschop
2015 (6th)	I'm Dead But I Have Friends	Je suis mort mais j'ai des amis	Eve Martin
2016 (7th)	The First, the Last	Les Premiers, les Derniers	Paul Rouschop
2016 (7th)	Eternity	Éternité	Véronique Sacrez
2016 (7th)	Keeper		Florin Dima
2017 (8th)	Raw	Grave	Laurie Colson
2017 (8th)	Angel	Mon ange	Luc Noël
2017 (8th)	A Wedding	Noces	Catherine Cosme
2018 (9th)	Let the Corpses Tan	Laissez bronzer les cadavres	Alina Santos
2018 (9th)	Bye Bye Germany	Es war einmal in Deutschland...	Véronique Sacrez
2018 (9th)	Girl		Philippe Bertin
2019 (10th)	Lola	Lola vers la mer	Catherine Cosme
2019 (10th)	Patrick	De Patrick	Hubert Pouille and Pepijn Van Looy
2019 (10th)	The Room		Françoise Joset

=== 2020s ===
Year	English title	Original title	Interior decorator(s)
2020/21 (11th)	Madly in Life	Une vie démente	Lisa Etienne
2020/21 (11th)	The Restless	Les Intranquilles	Anna Falguères
2020/21 (11th)	Titane		Laurie Colson and Lise Péault
2022 (12th)	Close		Ève Martin
2022 (12th)	Nobody Has to Know		Paul Rouschop
2022 (12th)	Zero Fucks Given	Rien à foutre	Anna Falguères
2023 (13th)	Omen	Augure	Ève Martin
2023 (13th)	The Experience of Love	Le Syndrome des amours passées	Julien Dubourg
2023 (13th)	Love According to Dalva	Dalva	Catherine Cosme
2024 (14th)	Night Call	La nuit se traîne	Catherine Cosme
2024 (14th)	It's Raining in the House	Il pleut dans la maison	Ladys Oliviera Silva
2024 (14th)	Through the Night	Quitter la nuit	Ève Martin
2025 (15th)	Reflection in a Dead Diamond	Reflet dans un diamant mort	Laurie Colson
2025 (15th)	The Richest Woman in the World	La Femme la plus riche du monde	Ève Martin
2025 (15th)	Maldoror		Emmanuel De Meulemeester
