= The Restless (2021 film) =

2021 film

- Directed by: Joachim Lafosse
- Written by: Joachim Lafosse; Juliette Goudot; Anne-Lise Morin; François Pirot; Chloé Léonil; Lou du Pontavice
- Produced by: Anton Iffland Stettner; Eva Kuperman; Jani Thiltges
- Starring: Leïla Bekhti; Damien Bonnard
- Cinematography: Jean-François Hensgens
- Edited by: Marie-Hélène Dozo
- Distributed by: Les Films du Losange (France)
- Release dates: 16 July 2021 (Cannes); 20 October 2021 (France)
- Countries: Belgium; Luxembourg; France
- Language: French
- Box office: $1.1 million

The Restless (French: Les Intranquilles) is a 2021 international co-production drama film directed by Joachim Lafosse, starring Leïla Bekhti and Damien Bonnard. It revolves around Damien and Leïla, a couple in love as they battle with his bipolar disorder. In June 2021, the film was selected to compete for the Palme d'Or at the 2021 Cannes Film Festival.

At the 11th Magritte Awards, The Restless was nominated for six awards, including Best Film and Best Director for Lafosse.

== Cast and characters ==
- Leïla Bekhti as Leïla
- Damien Bonnard as Damien
- Gabriel Merz Chammah as Amine
- Patrick Descamps as Patrick
- Luc Schiltz as bakery customer
- Larisa Faber as bakery owner
- Elsa Rauchs as Anne
- Jules Waringo as Jérôme
- Joël Delsaut as André

== Accolades ==
Award / Film Festival	Category	Recipients and nominees	Result
Cannes Film Festival	Palme d'Or		Nominated
César Awards	Best Actor	Damien Bonnard	Nominated
César Awards	Best Actress	Leïla Bekhti	Nominated
Lumière Awards	Best Actor	Damien Bonnard	Nominated
Lumière Awards	Best International Co-Production		Nominated
Magritte Awards	Best Film		Nominated
Magritte Awards	Best Director	Joachim Lafosse	Nominated
Magritte Awards	Best Screenplay	Joachim Lafosse et al.	Nominated
Magritte Awards	Best Supporting Actor	Patrick Descamps	Nominated
Magritte Awards	Best Production Design	Anna Falguères	Nominated
Magritte Awards	Best Editing	Marie-Hélène Dozo	Nominated
