= Jumbo (2020 film) =

- Official poster
- Directed by: Zoé Wittock
- Written by: Zoé Wittock
- Produced by: Anaïs Bertrand; Annabella Nezri; Gilles Chanial
- Starring: Noémie Merlant; Emmanuelle Bercot; Bastien Bouillon; Sam Louwyck
- Cinematography: Thomas Buelens
- Edited by: Thomas Fernandez
- Music by: Thomas Roussel
- Production companies: Insolence Productions; Les Films Fauves; Kwassa Films
- Distributed by: Rezo Films (France); O'Brother Distribution (Belgium); Dark Star Pictures (United States)
- Release dates: 24 January 2020 (Sundance); 18 March 2020 (Belgium); 1 July 2020 (France)
- Running time: 93 minutes
- Countries: France; Belgium; Luxembourg
- Language: French
- Budget: €2.9 million

Jumbo is a 2020 fantasy drama film written and directed by Zoé Wittock in her feature directorial debut. An international co-production of France, Belgium and Luxembourg, the film stars Noémie Merlant as Jeanne, a shy amusement-park worker who develops a romantic and sexual attachment to a fairground ride. Emmanuelle Bercot, Bastien Bouillon and Sam Louwyck appear in supporting roles.

The film was inspired by accounts of object sexuality, particularly the story of Erika Eiffel, an American woman known for her relationship with the Eiffel Tower. Wittock approached the subject as a love story rather than a clinical study, using the movement, lights and sounds of an amusement-park ride to suggest communication between Jeanne and the machine.

Jumbo had its world premiere in the World Cinema Dramatic Competition at the Sundance Film Festival on 24 January 2020 and subsequently screened in the Generation 14plus section of the 70th Berlin International Film Festival. Its planned Belgian theatrical release was cancelled following the closure of cinemas during the COVID-19 pandemic, and it was instead released there on video on demand. The film received a nomination for European Discovery at the 33rd European Film Awards, and at the 11th Magritte Awards was nominated for Best First Feature Film and Best Supporting Actor for Louwyck.

== Plot ==
Jeanne Tantois is a shy young woman with a longstanding fascination with amusement-park rides. She builds miniature mechanical attractions in her bedroom and has difficulty relating to other people. She lives with her outgoing mother Margarette, whose uninhibited approach to relationships frequently embarrasses her.

Jeanne begins working nights at a local amusement park, where a new ride called "Move It" has recently been installed. Her manager, Marc, is attracted to her and attempts to begin a relationship, but Jeanne becomes increasingly preoccupied with the new attraction. She privately renames it Jumbo.

While cleaning and maintaining Jumbo after the park closes, Jeanne begins to interpret its lights, sounds and movements as responses to her presence. She develops a system of communication with it and comes to believe that the attraction reciprocates her feelings. Their encounters become increasingly intimate, culminating in a dreamlike sexual experience in which Jeanne imagines herself surrounded by Jumbo's machinery and black oil.

At the same time, Margarette begins a relationship with Hubert, a visitor from outside the area. Margarette is initially pleased when Jeanne tells her that she has fallen in love, assuming that she means Marc. When she discovers that Jeanne is referring to an amusement-park ride, she reacts with disbelief and hostility. Jeanne nevertheless insists that her feelings are real.

Margarette rejects Jeanne's relationship with Jumbo and throws her out of the house. Distressed, Jeanne returns to the park and later has sex with Marc, but remains attached to Jumbo. At the park's end-of-season party, Marc names Jeanne Employee of the Year before announcing that Move It will be removed because it has failed to attract enough visitors. Jeanne attacks him onstage.

Hubert criticizes both Marc and Margarette for their treatment of Jeanne. Margarette eventually reconciles with her daughter and accepts her relationship. Before Jumbo leaves the park, Jeanne holds a wedding ceremony beneath the ride, attended by Margarette and Hubert.

== Cast ==
- Noémie Merlant as Jeanne Tantois
- Emmanuelle Bercot as Margarette
- Bastien Bouillon as Marc
- Sam Louwyck as Hubert
- Tracy Dossou as Fati

== Production ==
=== Development ===
Wittock developed the idea for Jumbo after reading about Erika Eiffel, who had become known for her romantic attachment to the Eiffel Tower. Wittock contacted Eiffel while researching object sexuality and said that their conversations helped shift her view of the subject away from the stereotypes she had initially associated with it. Eiffel's description of her experience as essentially a love story became one of the starting points for the screenplay.

Wittock decided not to model Jeanne's relationship directly on the Eiffel Tower, which she considered too static for the film she wanted to make. She instead chose an amusement-park attraction because it could move, produce sounds and use lights, allowing the object to appear responsive without giving it a human voice or turning it into an explicitly anthropomorphic machine.

The project took part in the Mannheim Meeting Place and the Frontières international co-production market before entering production. Anaïs Bertrand produced the film through the French company Insolence Productions, with Belgium's Kwassa Films and Luxembourg's Les Films Fauves as co-producers. Financing included support from the CNC, Eurimages, the Wallonia-Brussels Federation and Film Fund Luxembourg. The film had a budget of approximately €2.9 million.

=== Casting ===
Nearly 100 actresses were auditioned for the role of Jeanne. Wittock later recalled that although Merlant gave a strong first audition, she was initially not called back because the director thought her presence appeared too forceful for the character. After continuing the search for several months, Wittock invited her to audition again and cast her in the role.

Jumbo was filmed before Merlant was cast in Céline Sciamma's Portrait of a Lady on Fire, although the latter film was completed and released first. Wittock approached Bercot after seeing her work as both an actress and filmmaker, particularly her performance in My King.

=== Filming and effects ===
Principal photography began on 16 April 2018 and was scheduled to continue until 1 June, with filming in Belgium and Luxembourg. The amusement-park scenes were filmed at Plopsa Coo in the Belgian Ardennes. Wittock said the production searched extensively for an attraction that was visually imposing while remaining at a scale that allowed Jeanne and the machine to share the frame.

Most of Jumbo's movements and lighting effects were achieved on set. The ride's electrical system was modified and roughly 3,000 bulbs were replaced so that its lighting could be controlled for individual scenes. Its movements were restricted to those the machine could actually perform, while its sounds were designed to remain plausible for the ride. Belgian visual-effects company Benuts supplemented the practical footage, particularly for the oil sequences and the final light display.

== Themes and style ==
Wittock described the film as closer to surrealism and magic realism than conventional fantasy. She avoided providing a medical explanation for Jeanne's object sexuality, saying that her primary interest was in Jeanne's emotional experience and in the conflict produced when other people refuse to accept it.

Anton Bitel of Sight and Sound described the story as both a coming-of-age narrative and a variation on the conventional screen romance, with the familiar stages of attraction, sex, opposition and marriage transferred to a relationship between a woman and a machine.

== Release ==
Jumbo had its world premiere at the Sundance Film Festival on 24 January 2020. It screened in the Generation 14plus programme of the 70th Berlin International Film Festival on 26 February.

The film was scheduled for theatrical release in Belgium on 18 March 2020, but cinema closures during the COVID-19 pandemic led distributor O'Brother to release it through video on demand instead. It opened theatrically in France through Rezo Films on 1 July 2020.

Dark Star Pictures acquired the United States distribution rights in May 2020. The film received a limited U.S. theatrical and virtual-cinema release on 19 February 2021, followed by video on demand on 16 March. It was released theatrically in the United Kingdom on 9 July 2021.

== Critical reception ==
As of October 2021, Jumbo holds a 78% approval rating on review aggregator website Rotten Tomatoes, based on 68 reviews, with an average rating of 6.8/10. On Metacritic, the film has a weighted average score of 60 out of 100, based on 18 critics, indicating "mixed or average reviews".

Fionnuala Halligan of Screen International called the film an attention-grabbing debut and praised the neon-lit scenes involving Jumbo, but found its characters and story too broadly developed for the premise. Carlos Aguilar of RogerEbert.com praised the sequences between Jeanne and Jumbo but wrote that the film did not fully explore the consequences of its central relationship.

Michael Ordoña of the Los Angeles Times singled out Merlant's performance for making Jeanne's feelings convincing and praised Thomas Buelens's cinematography, particularly the contrast between the subdued colours of Jeanne's everyday surroundings and the changing lights of her encounters with Jumbo. Anton Bitel of Sight and Sound praised the film's commitment to Jeanne's perspective and described its treatment of the relationship in terms of magical realism.

== Accolades ==
Year	Award	Category	Recipient(s)	Result	Ref.
2020	Berlin International Film Festival	Gilde Film Prize – Generation 14plus	Jumbo	Won	
2020	Chattanooga Film Festival	Audience Award	Jumbo	Won	
2020	European Film Awards	European Discovery – Prix FIPRESCI	Zoé Wittock	Nominated	
2022	11th Magritte Awards	Best First Feature Film	Zoé Wittock	Nominated	
2022	11th Magritte Awards	Best Supporting Actor	Sam Louwyck	Nominated	

== See also ==
- Object sexuality
