= Happy End (2017 film) =

2017 film

- Film poster
- Directed by: Michael Haneke
- Written by: Michael Haneke
- Produced by: Margaret Ménégoz
- Starring: Isabelle Huppert; Jean-Louis Trintignant; Mathieu Kassovitz; Toby Jones
- Cinematography: Christian Berger
- Edited by: Monika Willi
- Production companies: Les Films du Losange; X-Filme Creative Pool; Wega Film
- Distributed by: Les Films du Losange (France); X-Verleih (through Warner Bros.) (Germany); Filmladen (Austria)
- Release dates: 22 May 2017 (Cannes); 12 October 2017 (Germany); 18 October 2017 (France)
- Running time: 107 minutes
- Countries: France; Germany; Austria
- Languages: English; French
- Box office: $1.8 million

Happy End is a 2017 drama film written and directed by Michael Haneke, and starring Isabelle Huppert and Jean-Louis Trintignant, who had also played daughter and father in Haneke's 2012 film Amour.

The film was selected to compete for the Palme d'Or in the main competition section at the 2017 Cannes Film Festival. Released in the United States on 22 December 2017 by Sony Pictures Classics, it was selected as the Austrian entry for the Best Foreign Language Film at the 90th Academy Awards, but was not nominated. Huppert and Trintignant were nominated for European Film Awards for Best Actress and Best Actor respectively. It is Haneke's final film before his retirement.

== Synopsis ==
The film starts with clips secretly filmed with a smartphone by Eve Laurent, a teenager, showing her mother and overlaid with text messages from Eve saying that her mother is selfish and uncaring. Eve feeds her hamster a sedative and it dies. The last clip shows Eve's mother unconscious and Eve admitting that she poisoned her too with sedatives.

The next scene shows security camera video depicting an accident at a construction site. The site's construction firm is owned by Anne Laurent, Eve's aunt. Anne is then shown having dinner with her father, Georges Laurent, who has dementia, as well as her son Pierre, who works for the construction company and has a drinking problem; her brother, Thomas Laurent, who is a surgeon; and his wife Anaïs. They all live together in a large mansion in Calais. We learn that the accident injured one of the construction workers and he will probably not survive his injuries. Eve comes to live with her father's family while her mother is in the hospital, and begins to have suspicions that her father is having an affair. One day at the beach she overhears Thomas talking on his cellphone to a woman, and she asks him if he still loves Anaïs.

Pierre goes to an apartment building in the banlieue where he is confronted and badly beaten by a young man, who is later identified as the son of the construction worker injured in the accident. Pierre then flees the mansion and hides in an empty apartment, where he is found by Anne. They have an argument during which she asks him why he started drinking, accuses him of not taking his job in the construction firm seriously, and tells him that had he gone to the police after being beaten up, their chances in their legal dispute with the family of the construction worker would be much better. We later see her and her lawyer talking with the family, offering some money and alluding to the legal consequences of the physical assault on Pierre by the worker's son. Pierre is later shown trying to embarrass his mother by calling one of the housemaids a "slave" in front of a large gathering during a party at the mansion.

After Eve's mother falls into a coma as a result of the poisoning, which everyone believes was a suicide attempt, Eve is taken in by Thomas, her estranged father. She hacks into his computer and finds many e-mails and chat messages which show that he has a sadomasochistic sexual relationship with a female musician. Eve tries to commit suicide by taking the rest of the sedatives which she had pocketed. She survives and when her father asks her at her hospital bed why she did it, she confronts him with her knowledge of his affair and accuses him of not being able to love anyone, neither her mother, Anaïs, nor herself. Thomas is left speechless. A short time later, Eve's mother dies from the poisoning.

Georges Laurent, depressed because of his dementia and frailty, had already tried to commit suicide before and is shown late at night driving off in a car which he steers directly into a tree in another suicide attempt. Now using a wheelchair due to bone fractures from the car crash, he asks his longtime barber to help obtain a gun or medication for another suicide attempt, but the barber refuses. After Eve's own attempt, Thomas asks Georges to talk to her and he asks her why she took the sedatives. When she does not answer, Georges tells her the story of how, when his wife became ill, she suffered so terribly that he finally smothered her and killed her. Eve tells him that shortly after her father left her mother, she was sent to a youth camp where she was prescribed sedatives. She did not take the medication herself but slipped it into the food of another girl in the camp whom she did not like. When the poisoning was detected Eve was sent home. When Georges asks her if she regrets doing it she says she doesn't, then claims she did.

At a large party at a beach restaurant in honor of Anne's engagement, Pierre arrives late with several refugees from the Calais Jungle in tow. When he starts presenting them to the party crowd, Anne intervenes. He pushes her to the side, but she breaks his finger, obliging him to stop. While this is happening, Georges asks Eve to wheel him outside. Leaving the party unnoticed, he asks her to push him down a slipway toward the sea. They go to the edge of the water where he proceeds to wheel himself into the water up to his neck. As Eve starts recording this scene with her smartphone, the last scene of the film is seen through the lens of the phone: Georges is almost fully submerged in the water when Thomas and Anne rush down the slipway, with Anne casting a shocked look back at Eve.

== Cast ==
- Isabelle Huppert as Anne Laurent
- Jean-Louis Trintignant as Georges Laurent
- Mathieu Kassovitz as Thomas Laurent
- Franz Rogowski as Pierre Laurent
- Fantine Harduin as Eve Laurent
- Laura Verlinden as Anaïs Laurent
- Toby Jones as Lawrence Bradshaw
- Loubna Abidar as Claire
- Nabiha Akkari as Jamila
- Hassam Ghancy as Rachid
- Hille Perl as Female Musician

== Production ==
In December 2015, French media reported that Michael Haneke would reunite with Amour actors Isabelle Huppert and Jean-Louis Trintignant for his newest project Happy End, with the European migrant crisis potentially forming the backdrop of the film's plot. On 12 February 2016, Haneke's longtime producer Margaret Ménégoz confirmed that the project would begin filming in northern France in the summer of 2016. On 27 June 2016, Happy End began filming in Calais, with Mathieu Kassovitz also joining the cast. It was reported that French production company Les Films du Losange had secured distribution deals in a number of countries.

== Release ==
In November 2016, Sony Pictures Classics acquired North and Latin American distribution rights to the film.

== Reception ==
=== Cannes premiere ===
After the film's initial screening at the Cannes Film Festival, some critics acclaimed Happy End while several others "complained that Haneke [...] was retreading old ground." In a five-star review for The Guardian, Peter Bradshaw called the film "as stark, brilliant and unforgiving as a halogen light", praising Haneke's visual composition and noting how the narrative "sometimes takes insidious little leaps forward, allowing us to register with a lurch the awful things that have been passed over." Eric Kohn of IndieWire was also highly positive, arguing that "rather than smothering the material in bad vibes, the filmmaker uses them to gradually reveal a fascinating world in which anger and resentment becomes the only weapon any of these people know how to wield." Conversely, Tim Robey wrote in The Telegraph that the film felt "shockingly familiar", stating, "Haneke’s style is less cumulative and more detached than ever. The film steadfastly refuses to coalesce, as thesis, thriller, winking satire on European wealth, despairing family soap opera, or any of the modes it suggests."

=== Critical response ===
On review aggregation website Rotten Tomatoes, the film has an approval rating of 70% based on 150 reviews, with an average rating of 6.93/10. The website's critical consensus reads, "Happy End is far from Haneke's best work, yet it still succeeds in forcing audiences to confront—and uncomfortably consider—the dark side of human nature." On Metacritic, the film has a weighted average score of 72 out of 100 based on 30 critics, indicating "generally favorable reviews".

== See also ==
- List of submissions to the 90th Academy Awards for Best Foreign Language Film
- List of Austrian submissions for the Academy Award for Best Foreign Language Film
