= 22nd of May (film) =

2010 Belgian film directed by Koen Mortier

- Directed by: Koen Mortier
- Written by: Koen Mortier
- Produced by: Eurydice Gysel; Koen Mortier; Rebekka Garrido
- Starring: Hercules Adipas; Barbara Callewaert; Titus De Voogdt
- Cinematography: Glynn Speeckaert
- Edited by: Nico Leunen
- Music by: Michael Gallagher
- Production companies: IJswater Film; CCCP
- Distributed by: Cinéart
- Release date: 17 November 2010 (Belgium)
- Running time: 88 minutes
- Country: Belgium
- Languages: Dutch; French

22nd of May (Flemish Tweeëntwintig mei) is a 2010 Belgian thriller film written and directed by Koen Mortier. The film stars Sam Louwyck, Barbara Callewaert, and Titus De Voogdt. The film follows the aftermath of an explosion at a shopping mall. Sam, a security guard, attempts to save the victims, but is mistaken for the perpetrator of the attack.

The film won the Golden Owl Award at the Leeds International Film Festival, and was nominated for several other awards.

== Cast ==
- Sam Louwyck ... Sam
- Titus De Voogdt ... Nico Degeest
- Wim Willaert ... Wim
- Norman Baert ... Norman
- Barbara Callewaert ... Sandra Lauwaert

== Awards ==
=== Won ===
- Leeds International Film Festival 2011:
  - Golden Owl Award - highlighting independent arthouse filmmaking
- Mexico International Film Festival 2011:
  - Golden Palm Award - Feature

=== Nominated ===
- Toronto International Film Festival 2010:
  - Visions Award - Koen Mortier
- Cinequest San Jose Film Festival 2011:
  - New Vision Award - Global Landscapes Competition: Koen Mortier
- Hong Kong International Film Festival 2011:
  - Silver DV Award - Global Vision Competition: Koen Mortier
- Rotterdam International Film Festival 2011:
  - Tiger Award - Koen Mortier
- Seattle International Film Festival 2011:
  - New Director's Showcase Award - Contemporary World Cinema: Koen Mortier
- Film Festival Oostende 2011
  - Best Cinematography: Glynn Speeckaert
  - Best Music: Mike Gallagher
- Magritte Awards 2012:
  - Best Flemish Film in Coproduction: Koen Mortier
