= Employee of the Month =

Employee of the Month may refer to:

- Employee of the Month (program), a program which involves giving out business award to employees of a particular business on a monthly basis, a popular tradition in North America
- Employee of the Month (podcast), a comedy talk show and podcast hosted by Catie Lazarus who interviews famous people about their jobs
- Employee of the Month (2004 film), a black comedy movie starring Matt Dillon and Christina Applegate
- Employee of the Month (2006 film), a movie starring Dane Cook and Jessica Simpson
- "Employee of the Month" (The Sopranos), an episode of The Sopranos (Season 3, 2001)
- "Employee of the Month", an episode of General Hospital: Night Shift (Season 1, 2007)
- "Employee of the Month", an episode of SpongeBob SquarePants (Season 1, 1999)
- "Employee of the Month", an episode of Teen Titans (Season 4, 2005)
- "Employee of the Month", a song from the SpongeBob SquarePants album The Best Day Ever
- Employee of the Month, a 1998 album by Austin Lounge Lizards
- Employee of the Month EP, a 2002 EP by Relient K
