= Madly in Life =

- Film poster
- Directed by: Ann Sirot; Raphaël Balboni
- Written by: Ann Sirot; Raphaël Balboni
- Produced by: Julie Esparbes
- Starring: Jo Deseure; Jean Le Peltier; Lucie Debay; Gilles Remiche
- Cinematography: Jorge Piquer Rodríguez
- Edited by: Sophie Vercruysse; Raphaël Balboni
- Release dates: 2 October 2020 (Namur); 4 November 2020
- Running time: 87 minutes
- Country: Belgium
- Language: French

Madly in Life (French: Une vie démente) is a 2020 Belgian comedy-drama film written and directed by Ann Sirot and Raphaël Balboni in their feature directorial debut. The film stars Jo Deseure, Jean Le Peltier, Lucie Debay and Gilles Remiche, and follows an aging woman dealing with her progressing dementia with the help of her son. It was the last film in which Remiche starred before his death in 2022.

The film had its world premiere as the opening film at the Namur Film Festival on 2 October 2020. It was theatrically released in Belgium on 4 November 2020, before streaming in other territories starting on 14 January 2022. Upon release, Madly in Life was acclaimed by critics, who lauded the cast performances and the production values as well as the sensitive portrayal of its subject matter.

At the 11th Magritte Awards, Madly in Life received a record-tying twelve nominations and won seven awards, including Best Film and Best Screenplay for Sirot and Balboni.

== Cast ==
- Jo Deseure as Suzanne Merteens
- Jean Le Peltier as Alex
- Lucie Debay as Noémie
- Gilles Remiche as Kevin

== Accolades ==
Award / Film Festival	Category	Recipients and nominees	Result
Cabourg Film Festival	Grand Prix	Ann Sirot and Raphaël Balboni	Nominated
Chistera Awards	Best Film		Nominated
Chistera Awards	Best Director	Ann Sirot and Raphaël Balboni	Won
Chistera Awards	Best Actress	Jo Deseure	Won
Chistera Awards	Young Jury Prize		Won
Cinemania	Hoppenheim Prize	Ann Sirot and Raphaël Balboni	Won
Galway Film Fleadh	Best International Film		Nominated
Magritte Awards	Best Film		Won
Magritte Awards	Best Director	Ann Sirot and Raphaël Balboni	Nominated
Magritte Awards	Best Screenplay	Ann Sirot and Raphaël Balboni	Won
Magritte Awards	Best Actor	Jean Le Peltier	Won
Magritte Awards	Best Actress	Lucie Debay	Nominated
Magritte Awards	Best Actress	Jo Deseure	Won
Magritte Awards	Best Supporting Actor	Gilles Remiche	Won
Magritte Awards	Best First Feature Film		Nominated
Magritte Awards	Best Production Design	Lisa Etienne	Won
Magritte Awards	Best Costume Design	Frédérick Denis	Won
Magritte Awards	Best Sound	Bruno Schweisguth, Julien Mizac, Philippe Charbonnel	Nominated
Magritte Awards	Best Editing	Sophie Vercruysse and Raphaël Balboni	Nominated
Molodist Awards	Best Film		Nominated
Molodist Awards	Audience Award		Won
Namur Film Festival	Best Film		Nominated
Wolf PÖFF Awards	Best First Feature Film		Nominated
