= Victor Polster =

Belgian actor and dancer

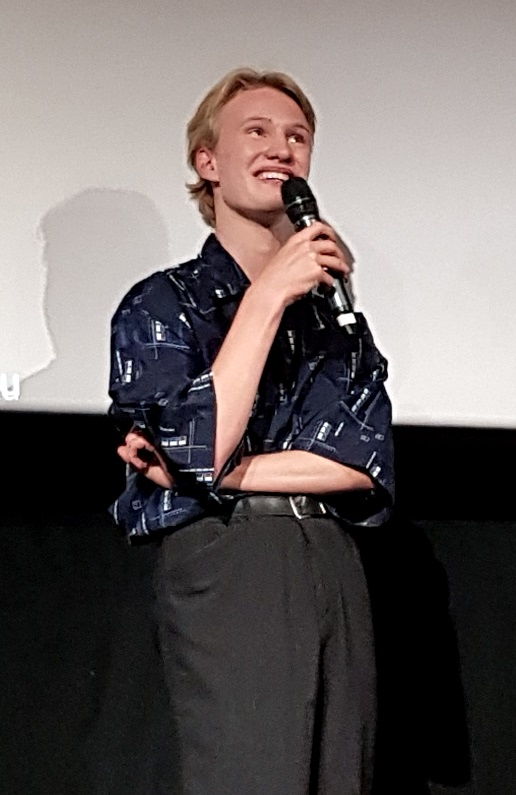
- Polster in October 2018
- Born: Victor Ketelslegers; 2002 (age 23–24); Brussels, Belgium
- Education: Royal Ballet School of Antwerp
- Occupations: Dancer; actor

Victor Ketelslegers (born 2002 in Brussels), known professionally as Victor Polster, is a Belgian actor and dancer.

== Career ==
After developing an interest in dancing, Polster enrolled at the Royal Ballet School of Antwerp. He appeared in a number of television commercials and music videos, before making his film debut in Girl, in which he played the role of Lara, a trans girl who pursues a career as a ballerina. The film premiered at the 2018 Cannes Film Festival, where Polster won the Un Certain Regard Jury Award for Best Performance.

His portrayal received general acclaim from film critics, resulting in numerous accolades. At the 9th Magritte Awards, Girl received nine nominations and won four, including Best Actor for Polster. From September 2020 through August 2023 he was part of the Staatstheater Nürnberg Ballet company. He continues as a guest performer in the same company in the role of Pablo for the piece "Der Steppenwolf" by Goyo Montero and is a dancer in Gothenburg.

== Filmography ==
| Year | Title | Role | Notes |
|---|---|---|---|
| 2018 | Girl | Lara Verhaeghen | Lisbon Gay & Lesbian Film Festival Award for Best Actor; Magritte Award for Best Actor; Odesa Film Festival Award for Best Performance; Stockholm Film Festival Award for Best Actor; Un Certain Regard Jury Award for Best Performance; Nominated—European Film Award for Best Actor |
