= The Ardennes (film) =

2015 film

- Film poster
- Directed by: Robin Pront
- Written by: Robin Pront
- Starring: Veerle Baetens
- Cinematography: Robrecht Heyvaert
- Edited by: Alain Dessauvage
- Release dates: 14 September 2015 (TIFF); 14 October 2015 (Belgium)
- Running time: 93 minutes
- Country: Belgium
- Language: Dutch
- Box office: $1.7 million

The Ardennes (Dutch: D'Ardennen,French: Les Ardennes) is a 2015 Belgian crime thriller drama film directed by Robin Pront. It was screened in the Discovery section of the 2015 Toronto International Film Festival. At the 6th Magritte Awards, it received the Magritte Award for Best Flemish Film. It was selected as the Belgian entry for the Best Foreign Language Film at the 89th Academy Awards but it was not nominated.

== Plot ==
The film opens with Dave (Jeroen Perceval) jumping into a pool, wearing a stocking over his face. He runs to a waiting car, where Sylvie (Veerle Baetens) asks him where his brother is. Dave says that he had to leave him behind. Dave's brother, Kenny (Kevin Janssens) is arrested and sentenced to seven years in prison.

Four years later, Dave is working at a car wash and Sylvie is working as a waitress at a sleazy nightclub; both are now sober and Sylvie attends regular AA meetings. One day at work, Dave gets a phone call informing him that Kenny is getting released early. That night, he goes to pick up Sylvie at work, and it is revealed that they have been dating for some time and Sylvie is pregnant with Dave's child. Sylvie wants to tell Kenny about their relationship, but Dave is reluctant.

Dave goes to pick Kenny up from prison. They stop on the way back to deliver a Christmas tree to their mother, Mariette (Viviane de Muynck). She makes Dave promise that he will take care of Kenny and stop him from getting in any more trouble. The following day, Dave takes Kenny with him to work at the carwash, and asks his boss, Robert, if he will hire Kenny. Robert initially says no, but after he loses a bet concerning a penalty kick in the soccer game that he is watching on TV, he hesitantly hires Kenny.

One night, Kenny follows Sylvie to her AA meeting. He interrupts the meeting and berates her for abandoning him in prison. She gets up and leaves, but Kenny follows her out. After a brief fight outside, Kenny relents and invites Sylvie to Christmas dinner at his house with his mother and Dave. Sylvie says she will think about it; Dave secretly watches the scene unfold from his car. Later, as Dave and Sylvie search for an apartment together, Sylvie tells Dave that Kenny invited her to Christmas dinner. Dave tells her that she must come, insisting that Kenny will find it strange if she doesn't.

At the Christmas dinner at Mariette's house, Kenny tries to pour Dave a glass of wine, but Dave tells him that he is now sober, which upsets Kenny. Mariette pulls Dave aside later and asks him when he is going to tell Kenny that Sylvie is pregnant with his child; Dave avoids the question. Later, Kenny invites Dave to come with him to the club where Sylvie works.

At the club, Dave tries to tell Kenny about the situation with Sylvie, but Kenny gets distracted watching Sylvie; he thinks she is flirting with her boss, Chalid. Kenny goes to confront Chalid and insults him, eventually beating him up after Chalid suggests that Kenny can no longer properly take care of Sylvie. As Kenny leaves the bar, he tries to apologize to Sylvie, but she rebuffs his apology, telling Kenny that she stopped visiting him in prison because he only reminded her of all the mistakes she'd made in her life.

The next day, while Kenny is at work at the car wash, he gets attacked by two of Chalid's goons. Kenny manages to overpower them, but Robert sees the fight and fires both Dave and Kenny. That night, Kenny borrows Dave's car and uses it to follow Sylvie after work. Again, he sees her talking with Chalid. Immediately after, Dave gets a phone call from Kenny and meets him in a parking garage. Kenny has a body in the trunk and needs Dave's help to dispose of it; Kenny claims that he tried to stand up to Chalid but that Chalid fell and cracked his head. Kenny says that his cellmate from prison, Stefan (Jan Bijvoet) is going to help them dispose of the body; Dave is reluctant to help, until Kenny threatens to tell the police that Dave was his accomplice in the robbery that got him arrested years ago.

Kenny and Dave drive out to the Ardennes, with the body still in the trunk of Dave's car. They meet Joyce (Sam Louwyck), Stefan's transvestite lover, who brings them to Stefan's property - a trailer in the middle of the forest. At Stefan's trailer, Kenny and Stefan snort cocaine off a knife while Joyce makes them pancakes. The gamekeeper for the forest, Gérard (Eric Godon) and his dog, Ricardo, arrive suddenly at Stefan's trailer to inform Stefan that some ostriches have gotten loose and are wandering the countryside. Gérard tells them that if they encounter an ostrich, they should call him right away, as ostriches can actually be quite violent and dangerous. Ricardo begins to bark at Dave's trunk; Gérard goes to investigate and sees the body. Gérard pretends as though he has not seen anything amiss, and gets into his car to go "warn the other residents" about the ostriches. However, Kenny knows that Gérard has seen the body; he grabs the cocaine knife and stabs Gérard in the neck with it. Gérard bleeds to death on the ground in front of Kenny and Stefan; Dave, shocked, runs off into the forest.

Dave emerges from the forest and hitches a ride to the nearest police station. While waiting to speak to an officer, Kenny arrives and sits down beside him in the lobby. Kenny begs Dave for help disposing of both of the bodies; Kenny promises that if Dave helps, he will leave Dave and Sylvie alone forever. Dave hesitates for a moment but eventually relents and follows Kenny outside the station, where Stefan and Joyce are waiting in separate cars. Kenny tells Dave to go with Joyce and get Gérard's body from Stefan's trailer.

At the trailer, Joyce pulls a gun on Dave. However, before Joyce can kill Dave, he smashes a glass over Joyce's head and they get into a long and brutal fight. Dave eventually gains the upper hand and kills Joyce; he then sets Stefan's trailer on fire, with Joyce's body inside.

Meanwhile, Kenny and Stefan are in a warehouse chopping up Gérard's corpse. Dave pulls up outside the warehouse, and Kenny and Stefan emerge, thinking that Joyce has returned with Dave's body. To their surprise, Dave emerges from the car holding a gun. Kenny tries to calm Dave down, but he cocks the gun in Kenny's face, intent on killing him. At that moment, two ostriches emerge from the forest and attack Kenny and Dave. Dave shoots at the ostriches, and the gunfire alerts a nearby police officer of their location.

Dave manages to scare off the ostriches, but he loses his gun in the scuffle. Stef, who is furious that Dave has killed Joyce, hits Dave with his car; Dave is injured but alive. Stef gets out of the car, wielding a tire iron, and walks towards Dave. Before he can kill him, however, Kenny picks up the gun and shoots Stef in the face, killing him instantly.

As the sound of police sirens approach in the distance and Dave lies bleeding, Kenny puts the gun against his head, intending to commit suicide. However, just as he is about to pull the trigger, Dave calls Sylvie's cellphone. Her ringtone can be heard coming from somewhere nearby; Kenny takes her phone out of his pocket. Dave stands up, and upon realizing what has happened, opens the trunk of his car. Sure enough, it is not Chalid's body in the trunk, but Sylvie's, lifeless and wrapped in a tarp. Dave attacks Kenny, screaming that Sylvie was pregnant. He crawls on top of Kenny and points the gun at his forehead.

At that moment, several police cruisers arrive. The officers get out of their vehicles and shout at Dave to drop his weapon. He does not respond, continuing to hold the gun against Kenny's head, and the police eventually shoot him. Kenny is arrested by the police as Dave's body lies next to Sylvie's, illuminated by the light from the police cars.

== Reception ==
The review aggregator website Rotten Tomatoes reported a 58% approval rating based on 31 reviews.

== Cast ==
- Kevin Janssens as Kenneth
- Jeroen Perceval as Dave
- Veerle Baetens as Sylvie
- Jan Bijvoet as Stef
- Sam Louwyck as Joyce
- Viviane de Muynck as Mariette
- Eric Godon as Gérard
- Peter Van Den Begin as Robert

== See also ==
- List of submissions to the 89th Academy Awards for Best Foreign Language Film
- List of Belgian submissions for the Academy Award for Best Foreign Language Film
