= Playground (2021 film) =

2021 film

- Theatrical release poster
- Directed by: Laura Wandel
- Produced by: Stéphane Lhoest
- Starring: Maya Vanderbeque; Günter Duret; Karim Leklou; Laura Verlinden
- Cinematography: Frédéric Noirhomme
- Edited by: Nicolas Rumpl
- Release dates: 8 July 2021 (Cannes); 20 October 2021 (Belgium)
- Running time: 72 minutes
- Country: Belgium
- Language: French

Playground (French: Un monde) is a 2021 Belgian drama film directed by Laura Wandel. In June 2021, the film was selected to compete in the Un Certain Regard section at the 2021 Cannes Film Festival. At Cannes, it won the FIPRESCI Prize in the Un Certain Regard section.

Playground received the André Cavens Award for Best Film by the Belgian Film Critics Association. At the 11th Magritte Awards, it was nominated for ten awards and won seven, including Best First Feature Film and Best Director for Wandel. It was selected as the Belgium’s Oscar-shortlisted International Feature and Belgian entry for the Best International Feature Film at the 94th Academy Awards. Ultimately, it was not nominated.

== Plot ==
Nora is a young elementary school student. She and her older brother Abel attend the same school. The siblings are close. Together they must navigate the social system in class and outside it. Abel has been targeted by some bullies, led by a much taller Antoine who is insolent even to a teacher. Nora doesn't understand why her brother refuses to admit to adults (even to their father) that he is being bullied. He advises Nora to avoid confronting the problem. Abel's bullies continue to torment him, and Nora's classmates are unsupportive.

When their father pressures Nora to explain why Abel is despondent and does not want to go to school, she confides that he is being bullied. Their father confronts the bullies, but even then, Abel resists his father's support. Abel warns Nora not to get involved or he will punish her. She later sees Abel again being bullied even worse by Antoine and his cadre, but she abides by Abel's warning. Abel is injured, and Nora and their father are notified. She is sad and guilt-ridden. She has realized that her intervention and attempt to help worsened Abel's situation, as he had insinuated. Her teacher Madame Agnes tries to console and reason with her. Nora admits to the teacher the extent of the problem. Nora explains the frustration that trying to help only caused more problems.

Nora's playmates express disdain for Abel, and Nora learns to detach emotionally from Abel, allowing him to keep distance. After a meeting with the bullies and their parents, Abel, Nora, their father and school administration, Antoine and the other bullies begrudgingly apologize. Nora attempts to integrate into her social circle and her classroom, physical education, and playground activities. When she realizes she is not invited to a schoolmate Victoire's birthday party, she has an outburst, grabbing the invitations from Victoire and ripping them. Madame Agnes becomes involved and assists Nora in repairing the invitations and returning them to Victoire. Nora realizes that Abel's status among the students, because of his bullying, has affected Nora's status, too. She begins to understand that the world of adults and the world of children are not always aligned. She attempts to socially distance herself further and further from Abel.

Madame Agnes explains to her class that she is moving away from the school. Nora is heartbroken and has a tearful goodbye, presenting her teacher with a drawing of the two of them. Madam Agnes consoles Nora. Despondent, Nora sees Abel at the playground and angrily confronts him as she recognizes his social status has damaged her own status. With her supportive teacher leaving, she becomes hostile, and she shoves Abel, who grapples with her. She bites him, and he slaps her. They hit each other repeatedly. When Ismael, a playmate of Abel's, tries to intervene, Abel turns on him and begins to choke him.

In class, Nora obstinately disobeys a teacher. She refuses to comply, and the teacher physically removes her from the classroom. She sees Ismael and tries to talk to him, but he is uninterested and avoids contact with her. Later, Abel and Nora uncomfortably sit together for a school photo. On the playground afterwards, Nora is playing alone when she hears a commotion and sees that Abel and another boy are bullying Ismael. She does not intervene, but when she sees Abel in the school hallway, she asks Abel why he would do this, and he admits he prefers it to being bullied himself. Nora sees Ismael go to his mother for support after school. Another day, she notices that Antoine and Abel are acting in tandem to bully Ismael, placing a plastic bag over his head. She runs over to intervene, imploring them to stop and grapples with Abel. She hugs him quietly from behind even though he does not relent with the bag on Ismael. Spent, Abel realizes what is truly happening. He stops, and, exhausted, he turns to hug his sister.

== Cast ==
- Maya Vanderbeque as Nora
- Günter Duret as Abel
- Karim Leklou as Finnigan
- Laura Verlinden as Agnes
- Lena Girard Voss as Clémence
- Thao Maerten as David

== Accolades ==
Award / Film Festival	Category	Recipients and nominees	Result
Belgian Film Critics Association	Best Film		Won
BFI London Film Festival	Sutherland Trophy		Won
Cannes Film Festival	Caméra d'Or		Nominated
Cannes Film Festival	FIPRESCI Prize		Won
European Film Awards	Discovery of the Year	Laura Wandel	Nominated
Magritte Awards	Best Film		Nominated
Magritte Awards	Best Director	Laura Wandel	Won
Magritte Awards	Best Screenplay	Laura Wandel	Nominated
Magritte Awards	Best Supporting Actress	Laura Verlinden	Won
Magritte Awards	Most Promising Actor	Günter Duret	Won
Magritte Awards	Most Promising Actress	Maya Vanderbeque	Won
Magritte Awards	Best First Feature Film		Won
Magritte Awards	Best Cinematography	Frédéric Noirhomme	Nominated
Magritte Awards	Best Sound	Mathieu Cox, Corinne Dubien, Thomas Grimm-Landsberg, David Vranken	Won
Magritte Awards	Best Editing	Nicolas Rumpl	Won
Goya Awards	Best European Film		Nominated

== See also ==
- List of submissions to the 94th Academy Awards for Best International Feature Film
- List of Belgian submissions for the Academy Award for Best International Feature Film
