= Girl (2018 film) =

2018 Belgian film by Lukas Dhont

- Theatrical release poster
- Directed by: Lukas Dhont
- Written by: Lukas Dhont; Angelo Tijssens
- Produced by: Dirk Impens
- Starring: Victor Polster; Arieh Worthalter; Katelijne Damen; Valentijn Dhaenens
- Cinematography: Frank van den Eeden
- Edited by: Alain Dessauvage
- Music by: Valentin Hadjadj
- Production companies: Menuet; Frakas Productions; Topkapi Films
- Distributed by: Lumière
- Release dates: 12 May 2018 (Cannes); 9 October 2018 (Belgium); 1 November 2018 (Netherlands)
- Running time: 106 minutes
- Countries: Belgium; Netherlands
- Languages: Dutch; French
- Budget: €1.5 million
- Box office: $4.2 million

Girl is a 2018 drama film directed by Lukas Dhont, in his feature debut. It was written by Dhont and Angelo Tijssens and stars Victor Polster, in his acting debut, as a trans girl who pursues a career as a ballerina.

The film screened in the Un Certain Regard section at the 2018 Cannes Film Festival, where it won the Caméra d'Or award, for best first feature film, as well as the Queer Palm, and Polster won the Un Certain Regard Jury Award for Best Performance. It was selected as the Belgian entry for the Best Foreign Language Film at the 91st Academy Awards, although it did not make the December shortlist. It received nine nominations at the 9th Magritte Awards and won four, including Best Screenplay and Best Actor for Polster.

Girl was inspired by Nora Monsecour, a trans female dancer from Belgium, whom Dhont met when he was 18 and she was 15. While initially praised by critics, the film was criticised by some trans and queer writers for its depiction of gender dysphoria and self-harm. Concern was also raised about the lead actor and director both being cisgender. Monsecour, who collaborated with Dhont and Tijssens on the film, has defended the film in response.

== Plot ==
Lara Verhaeghen is a fifteen year old Belgian transgender girl and aspiring professional ballerina. She applies to a prestigious ballet school in Antwerp, and upon acceptance (contingent on her performance during an eight-week trial), she moves to be closer to the school, with her supportive francophone father, Mathias, and younger brother, Milo. During this transitional time, Lara is speaking to doctors about her gender dysphoria, taking puberty blockers and regularly sees a psychiatrist, who is also supportive.

Lara performs well in school, and, despite the public knowledge that she is transgender, her classmates accept her, including using the girls' locker room, but she always uses a private restroom. Against advice, she tucks her penis with tape during practices. Lara's body endures more pain as she trains extensively. Nevertheless, her dedication to ballet and to her external appearance reflecting her gender identity motivate her. Six year old Milo, however, does not adjust as well and calls his sister by her deadname. Lara is supportive, and not only gets him ready and takes him to school each day but checks in on him from afar.

Time passes, and the doctors are ready to begin Lara's sex reassignment surgery. Although the full process will take two years, Lara eagerly signs the consent documents. Speaking to her psychiatrist later, she states that she does not want to date until she has the "right body". Her psychiatrist, however, tells her to enjoy her puberty as a teenager.

Although she begins hormone replacement therapy in preparation for her surgery, Lara's body does not change fast enough for her. One night, at a sleepover, some classmates bully her, but she leaves and goes home. She finds her father having dinner with his new girlfriend, and tells him she has returned because she has a stomach ache. Matthias does not pressure but brings it up on the way to the doctor the next day. At the appointment, the doctor notes that Lara has lost weight and has a genital infection, and tells Lara that she must stop taping and gain weight, because she has to be physically strong for the operation. Lara insists that she is fine, but her father disagrees.

After a near breakdown in class, Lara finds comfort with a boy in her building, who has shown interest in her. While she kisses him and he kisses back, she prevents him from touching her, and instead begins to perform oral sex on him and after he ejaculates Lara flees. Returning home, Lara instigates an argument with Matthias, who tries to be understanding but Lara refuses to open up.

Studio rehearsals are over and the students move to their first stage practice. Lara barely finishes, then collapses from exhaustion backstage. The next day, she wakes late and tries to leave, but when her father says she has not eaten, Lara lashes out and breaks down in tears. Later, at the doctor's office, her doctors tell her that she must stop dancing and regain her strength, otherwise, she will not be able to have the surgery, which is delayed.

At a family dinner some time later, Lara seems better. Some guests comment on how gorgeous she looks in her new dress, and later, she falls asleep cradling Milo. The next day, Matthias takes her coffee in bed before leaving for work and to drop off Milo at school. Lara prepares a bowl of ice, calls the emergency call centre and mutilates her penis with a pair of scissors. Matthias stays at her side in the ambulance and at her bedside. In the final scene, a recovered Lara, with shorter hair, walks determinedly down a street.

== Cast ==
- Victor Polster as Lara Verhaeghen
- Arieh Worthalter as Mathias Verhaeghen
- Olivar Bodart as Milo Verhaeghen
- Katelijne Damen as Dr. Naert
- Valentijn Dhaenens as Dr. Pascal
- Tijmen Govaerts as Lewis

== Production ==
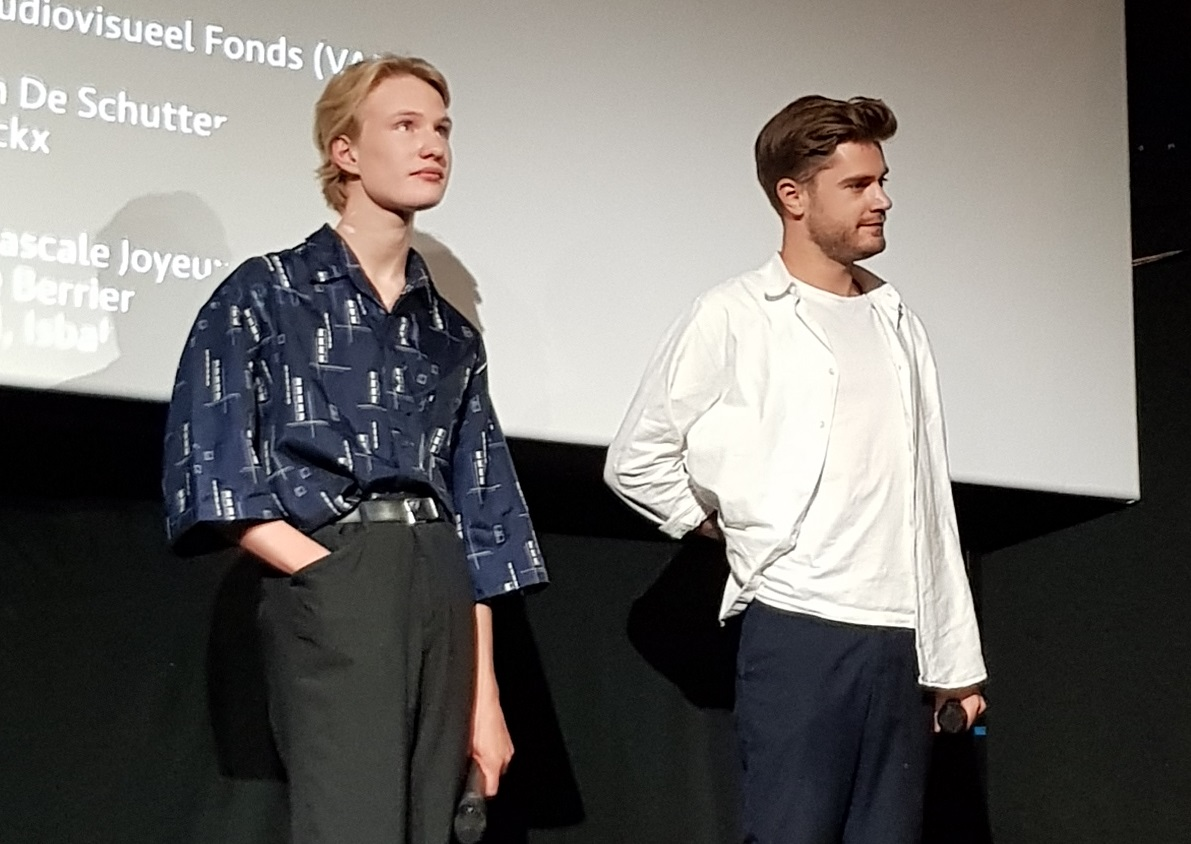
Victor Polster and Lukas Dhont at a Paris premiere of Girl.

The film was inspired by Nora Monsecour, a professional dancer and trans woman from Belgium. In 2009, Dhont, then 18 and a newly enrolled film student, read a newspaper article about Monsecour's request to her ballet school that she take the girls' class so she could learn en pointe skills. Unlike the protagonist of the film, Monsecour was not accepted to the girls' class, and since shifted her focus from ballet to contemporary dance. Dhont approached Monsecour to make a documentary about her, which she declined. Instead, he then went on to write a fictional narrative film with her and Tijssens, although Monsecour remained uncredited at her wish. Dhont consulted Monsecour, other transgender people and medical professionals for the film. Doctors at Ghent University Hospital, where Monsecour had been a patient, advised against casting a trans girl because she would be in a sensitive period of her transition.

The casting for the lead role was done with no regard to the actors' gender. After failing to find an actor who could both dance and act to their satisfaction among the 500 people aged between 14 and 17 who auditioned (six of whom were trans female), the filmmakers began casting the rest of the dancers who would appear in the film. It was in this group casting process that they found Polster. Monsecour was involved in the casting of Polster and was present on set during the filming. Polster took three months of voice training and of dance practices with pointe shoes. The filming involved nude scenes of Polster, then 14, with his parents' consent. The crew took particular care not to show his face and lower body in the same shot. Sidi Larbi Cherkaoui, artistic director of the Royal Ballet of Flanders, served as choreographer.

== Release ==
Girl premiered in the Un Certain Regard section at the 2018 Cannes Film Festival on 12 May 2018. In May 2018, Netflix acquired the rights to the film for North America and Latin America. While Netflix originally planned to release the film on its platform on 18 January 2019, the release was pushed back to 15 March 2019. Netflix released the film with a warning card, which read, "This film covers sensitive issues, and includes some sexual content, graphic nudity, and an act of self-harm", with a link to a website providing information about The Trevor Project's suicide hotline.

== Reception ==
=== Critical response ===
On review aggregator website Rotten Tomatoes, the film holds an approval rating of 83%, based on 63 reviews, and an average rating of 7.5/10. The site's critical consensus reads, "Girl uses one aspiring dancer's story as the framework for a poignant drama that approaches its difficult themes with fittingly alluring grace." On Metacritic, the film has a weighted average score of 73 out of 100, based on 15 critics, indicating "generally favorable reviews".

David Ehrlich of IndieWire called the film "arrestingly empathetic" and gave the film a grade of B+, while expressing a concern over the casting of the cisgender male actor for the role of a trans woman. Peter Debruge of Variety praised Polster's performance and called the film "an intuitively accessible look at a gender nonconforming teenager trying to find the courage to be herself". Boyd van Hoeij of The Hollywood Reporter praised the film's reliance on visuals and editing rather than dialogue, while raising concern about the casting and nudity, which he nonetheless found to be "a logical choice".

Wendy Ide of Screen International called the film "assured and empathetic", saying, "There is a compassion and intimacy to Dhont's approach to gender issues which evokes the work of Céline Sciamma, particularly in Tomboy." Steve Pond of TheWrap described the film as "a quiet movie until it isn't, a gentle character study that goes into extreme territory, a wrenching drama that you think is about finding acceptance until it threatens to become about the impossibility of that very thing", and wrote, "by the end, this quiet movie goes to a place of horrific pain and desperation. ... Dhont manages to find the briefest of grace notes in its aftermath".

Kimber Myers of the Los Angeles Times wrote that the cinematography which focuses on the protagonist's body "feels exploitative, rather than empathetic", and that "it's the irresponsible handling of the film's final, shocking scenes that is the most problematic". Myers concluded, "Dhont's film is a strong debut from a technical angle, but it lacks the humanity necessary for a story of this nature".

=== Criticism ===
Girl has been met with criticism from some trans and queer writers, particularly in regard to its depiction of gender dysphoria and self-harm.

Matthew Rodriguez of the Into magazine wrote, "the film is bloody and obsessed with trans bodies in a way that reminds us that a cisgender person wrote and directed it. It's trans trauma porn and, as a cisgender person, I'm warning trans people not to watch it and cis people not to fall for it", and that the shots of the cisgender male actor Polster's genitalia "convey a creepy, voyeuristic obsession with Lara's body that never loses its ick factor. ... Rather than uplifting Lara, the film almost seems to want to humiliate her and lament her struggle." Rodriguez also criticised the casting of Polster despite the character being supposed to be on puberty blockers: "young trans girls on blockers don't look like feminine or androgynous boys—they look like girls. Lara has started taking estrogen, and she is frustrated because her breasts haven't developed. Hormones affect more than breasts, yet the film focuses on breasts and the vagina as the sole things that make a trans girl a girl", while acknowledging some aspects of the film, such as the relationship between Lara and her father and the microaggressions she faces, as "well-wrought".

On the British Film Institute's website, trans female critic Cathy Brennan wrote, "Dhont's camera dwells on the teenage Lara's crotch with a troubling fascination throughout the entire runtime. ... The camera's gaze in Girl belongs to that of a cis person. It fits comfortably into the way cis audiences see people like me. They may smile to my face while wondering what's between my legs." In regard to the ending of the film in which the protagonist mutilates her penis, Brennan wrote, "It's a scene of severe trauma that the film has not earned the right to depict. Dhont's portrayal of gender dysphoria is so focused on the genitals that he offers no insight into the psychological facets of trans girl's psychology. To reduce it down to this one act of self-mutilation is cinematic barbarism."

Writing for The Hollywood Reporter, Oliver Whitney, who identifies as trans masculine, described Girl as "the most dangerous movie about a trans character in years". Whitney criticised the film's "disturbing fascination with trans bodies", writing, "Lara's genitals, shown in multiple full-frontal nude shots of Polster's penis, have a bigger presence throughout Girl and are central to more plot points than the character herself. ... What could have been a thoughtful exploration of a difficult part of a trans girl's daily life instead uses her body as a site of trauma, inviting the audience to react with disgust. Much like the cisgender characters who continually silence Lara and tell her how to feel, the director shows no interest in understanding her internal struggles." Whitney identified the depiction of hormone replacement therapy (HRT) to be the film's largest issue, writing that it "sends the inaccurate message that HRT will cause a trans person more agony" and is "outrageously irresponsible filmmaking", and concluded with a call for further inclusion of transgender people in the film industry, which in his opinion would have prevented the film from getting as much acclaim.

Tre'vell Anderson of the Out magazine also condemned the film's depiction of self-mutilation and lack of "substantive participation of trans voices". GLAAD posted quotations from these critics on Twitter, warning to "read what trans and queer critics are saying". GLAAD also sent out an email asking recipients to attend screenings and share articles critical of the film on social media in order to promote inclusion in the industry. In North America, the lack of early access to the film for critics not in major cities or in award-giving circles was criticised as consequentially diminishing and delaying opportunities for queer critics to voice their opinions.

The film was also met with criticism from the trans community in Belgium and France. The critics found the film to be fixated on physical, especially genital, aspects of transitioning when, according to Camille Pier, project manager at Brussels association network RainbowHouse, other factors such as administrative complications, environment, respect to human rights, and being a minor can pose more pressing problems. Researcher Héloïse Guimin-Fati described the film as having a "cis-centred" and "terribly masculine" vision, and said that "the character of Lara became an object when she should have been the subject of the film". They also found the film's emphasis on the protagonist's suffering and isolation and her not seeking help from the trans community despite having a supportive father and living in modern Belgium incongruous and perpetuating stereotypes. Londé Ngosso, director of Belgian organisation Genres Pluriels, said, "This does not take into account the reality of the country, social networks, the commitment of young people, all of the work we've done for eleven years. It makes us invisible instead of putting us forward."

In response to the criticism, Nora Monsecour, the dancer who inspired the film, defended the film in The Hollywood Reporter, writing, "Girl is not a representation of all transgender experiences, but rather a retelling of experiences that I faced during my journey. ... Girl tells my story in a way that doesn't lie, doesn't hide. To argue that Lara's experience as trans is not valid because Lukas is cis or because we have a cis lead actor offends me." In a subsequent interview with IndieWire, Monsecour repeated that she was "offended", saying, "My story is not a fantasy of the cis director. Lara's story is my story." She also stated that she viewed the self-mutilation at the end of the film as "a metaphor for suicidal thoughts or dark thoughts that are taking over, which I experienced myself", and that it was "crucial to show", adding, "The scene should not be interpreted [as] encouraging trans youth to cut certain body parts off themselves. That is not the message. The message is to show that these things are a result of dark thoughts, [which] are the result of the struggle that we face." In another interview, Monsecour told The New York Times, "The words people have used to describe Girl came close to my heart because the scenes they are criticizing are scenes that I had in mind during my transition. To criticize Lukas for portraying those things made me think, am I the only person who had suicidal thoughts or was bodily focused?"

Dhont responded to the criticism by saying, "We wanted to show this young trans girl in the world of the ballet, which is very binary, and her struggling with that. ... Not everyone can always like everything. I really am someone who wants to see trans directors directing trans stories, and someone that wants to see trans actors playing trans parts, any part. But let's not fight for inclusion by the tool of exclusion. Let's fight for inclusion by having everyone at the table."

Writing for The Advocate, Ann Thomas, the founder of a trans talent agency, defended the film, attributing the casting of the cis male actor to the lack of young trans actors working in Europe at the time of the pre-production, and described the film's portrayals as accurate. Non-binary dancer Chase Johnsey found the film's focus on the protagonist's physicality to be consistent with his experience as a ballet dancer, and said, "The struggles that trans and gender-fluid people often have in the ballet world are with their body, because it's a body-oriented art form." Phia Ménard, a French transgender director and performer, also found the film consistent with her experience, and the self-mutilation in the film comparable to teenage suicidal impulse.

Netflix was reported to be working with GLAAD and considering adding a warning to accompany the film, which Dhont has said he would endorse. In January 2019, The New York Times reported that Netflix had reached out to organisations for suggestions on how to word the warning. In December 2018, Netflix organised a screening of the film in Los Angeles to which queer and trans people were invited.

=== Accolades ===
| Award | Date of ceremony | Category | Recipients | Result | Ref. |
|---|---|---|---|---|---|
| Adelaide Film Festival | 10–21 Oct 2018 | Best Feature Film | Girl | Nominated | |
| Belgian Film Critics Association | 20 December 2018 | André Cavens Award for Best Film | Girl | Won | |
| Cannes Film Festival | 8–19 May 2018 | FIPRESCI Prize; Un Certain Regard | Girl | Won | |
| Cannes Film Festival | 8–19 May 2018 | Golden Camera | Lukas Dhont | Won | |
| Cannes Film Festival | 8–19 May 2018 | Queer Palm | Girl | Won | |
| Cannes Film Festival | 8–19 May 2018 | Un Certain Regard Jury Award for Best Performance | Victor Polster | Won | |
| Cannes Film Festival | 8–19 May 2018 | Un Certain Regard | Girl | Nominated | |
| César Award | 22 February 2019 | Best Foreign Film | Girl | Nominated | |
| CPH PIX Film Festival | 27 Set – 10 October 2018 | Best New Talent Grand PIX | Lukas Dhont | Nominated | |
| European Film Awards | 15 December 2018 | Best Film | Girl | Nominated | |
| European Film Awards | 15 December 2018 | Best Actor | Victor Polster | Nominated | |
| European Film Awards | 15 December 2018 | Best European Discovery | Girl | Won | |
| Golden Globes Awards | 6 January 2019 | Best Foreign Language Film | Girl | Nominated | |
| ICFF "Manaki Brothers" | 22-29 Sep 2018 | Golden Camera 300 | Frank van den Eeden | Nominated | |
| Jerusalem Film Festival | 22-29 Sep 2018 | International First Film | Lukas Dhont | Nominated | |
| Les Arcs European Film Festival | 16–23 Dec 2017 | TitraFilm Prize | Lukas Dhont | Won | |
| Lisbon Gay & Lesbian Film Festival | 14-22 Sep 2018 | Audience Award | Girl | Won | |
| Lisbon Gay & Lesbian Film Festival | 14-22 Sep 2018 | Best Actor | Victor Polster | Won | |
| London Film Festival | 10–21 Oct 2018 | Best First Feature Film | Lukas Dhont | Won | |
| Magritte Award | 2 February 2019 | Best Flemish Film | Girl | Won | |
| Magritte Award | 2 February 2019 | Best Actor | Victor Polster | Won | |
| Magritte Award | 2 February 2019 | Best Supporting Actor | Arieh Worthalter | Won | |
| Magritte Award | 2 February 2019 | Best Screenplay | Lukas Dhont and Angelo Tijssens | Won | |
| Magritte Award | 2 February 2019 | Best Cinematography | Frank van den Eeden | Nominated | |
| Magritte Award | 2 February 2019 | Best Production Design | Philippe Bertin | Nominated | |
| Magritte Award | 2 February 2019 | Best Costume Design | Catherine van Bree | Nominated | |
| Magritte Award | 2 February 2019 | Best Sound | Yanna Soentjens | Nominated | |
| Magritte Award | 2 February 2019 | Best Editing | Alain Dessauvage | Nominated | |
| Melbourne International Film Festival | 2–19 Aug 2018 | Best Narrative Feature | Girl | 7th place | |
| French National Center of Cinematography | 30 November 2018 | Best Film of the Year | Girl | 1st place | |
| Odesa International Film Festival | 13–21 Jul 2018 | Best International Film | Girl | Nominated | |
| Odesa International Film Festival | 13–21 Jul 2018 | Best Acting | Victor Polster | Won | |
| Oostende Film Festival | 7-15 Sep 2018 | Best National Debut | Lukas Dhont | Won | |
| Palić Film Festival | 14–20 Jul 2018 | Best Film | Girl | Won | |
| Philadelphia Film Festival | 18–28 Oct 2018 | Best First Film | Lukas Dhont | Nominated | |
| Pingyao International Film Festival | 11–20 Oct 2018 | People's Choice Award | Girl | Won | |
| San Sebastián International Film Festival | 21-29 Sep 2018 | Best Film | Girl | Won | |
| San Sebastián International Film Festival | 21-29 Sep 2018 | Best European Film | Girl | Won | |
| Seville European Film Festival | 9–17 Nov 2018 | Best LGBT Film (Ocaña Award) | Girl | Nominated | |
| Stockholm Film Festival | 7–18 Nov 2018 | Best Film | Girl | Nominated | |
| Stockholm Film Festival | 7–18 Nov 2018 | Best Actor | Victor Polster | Won | |
| Thessaloniki Film Festival | 1–11 Nov 2018 | Best LGBTQI-themed Film | Girl | Nominated | |
| Zurich Film Festival | Set 27 – 7 October 2018 | Best International Feature Film | Girl | Won | |

== See also ==
- List of submissions to the 91st Academy Awards for Best Foreign Language Film
- List of Belgian submissions for the Academy Award for Best Foreign Language Film
