= Adam's Interest =

2025 Belgian-French drama film

- Promotional poster
- French: L'intérêt d'Adam
- Directed by: Laura Wandel
- Written by: Laura Wandel
- Produced by: Delphine Tomson
- Starring: Léa Drucker; Anamaria Vartolomei
- Cinematography: Frédéric Noirhomme
- Edited by: Nicolas Rumpl
- Production companies: Les Films du Fleuve; Les Films de Pierre; Dragons Films; Lunanime
- Distributed by: Memento Distribution
- Release date: 14 May 2025 (Cannes)
- Running time: 73 minutes
- Countries: France; Belgium
- Language: French

Adam's Interest (French: L'intérêt d'Adam) is a 2025 Belgian-French drama film, written and directed by Laura Wandel. It stars Léa Drucker and Anamaria Vartolomei.

The film had its world premiere at the Critics' Week section of the 2025 Cannes Film Festival, on 14 May 2025.

== Premise ==
After a court order, Adam is hospitalized due to malnutrition, however, his mother refuses to leave his side.

== Cast ==
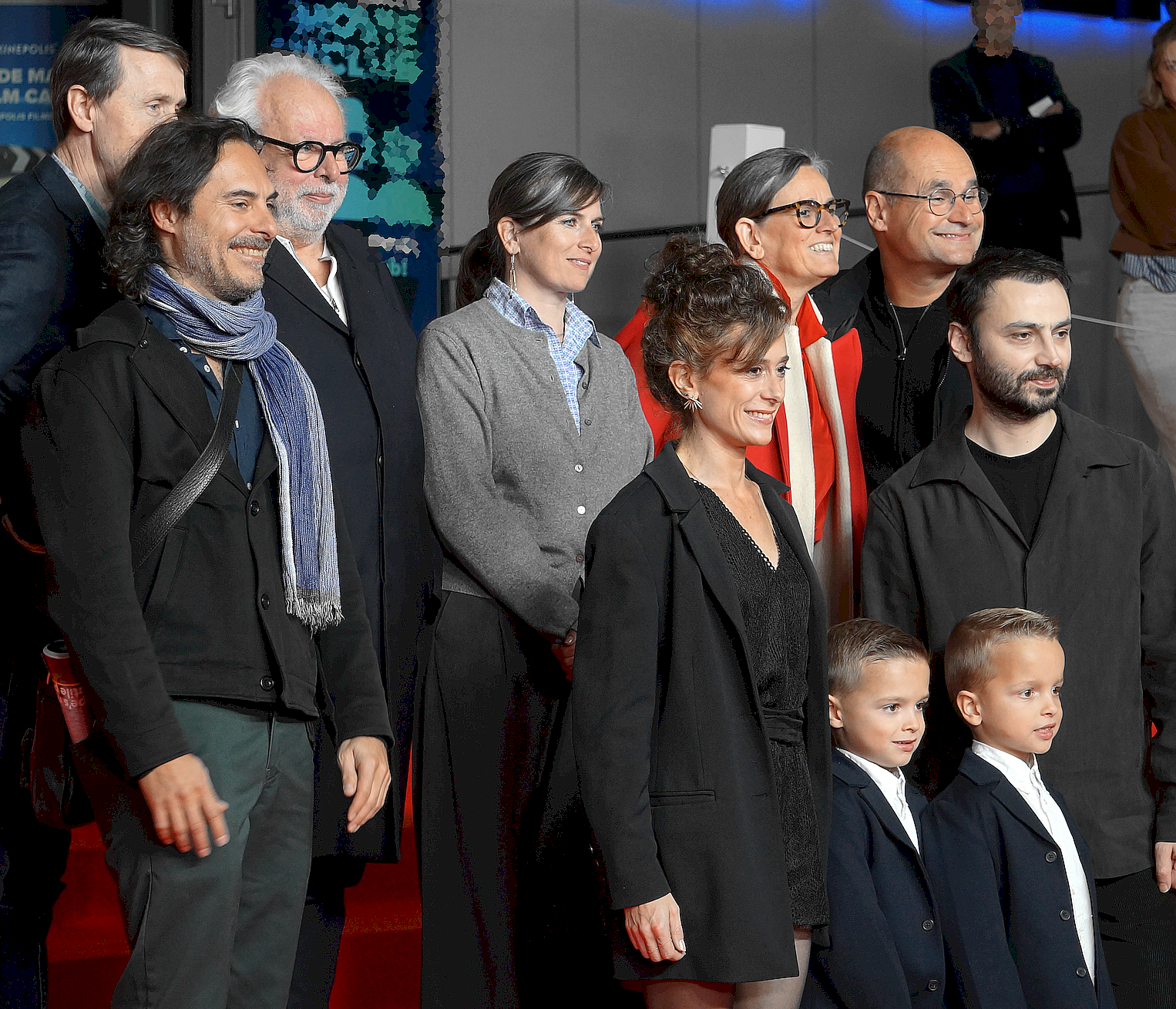
The film cast and crew at the 2025 Film Fest Gent

- Léa Drucker as Lucy
- Anamaria Vartolomei as Rebecca
- Alex Descas as Naïm

== Production ==
In May 2024, it was announced Laura Wandel would direct the film from a screenplay she wrote, with Les Films du Fleuve set to produce. In July 2024, Léa Drucker and Anamaria Vartolomei joined the cast, with principal photography commencing.

== Release ==
It had its world premiere on 14 May 2025 at the 2025 Cannes Film Festival in the Critics' Week section.

In August 2025, the film was selected at the Network of the Festivals in the Adriatic Region Programmes in conjunction with 31st Sarajevo Film Festival for Adriatic Audience Award along with other six films.
