= Working Girls (2020 film) =

2020 film

- Theatrical release poster
- Directed by: Frédéric Fonteyne; Anne Paulicevich
- Written by: Anne Paulicevich
- Produced by: Jacques-Henri Bronckart; Olivier Bronckart; Yaël Fogiel; Laetitia Gonzalez
- Starring: Sara Forestier
- Cinematography: Juliette Van Dormael
- Edited by: Chantal Hymans; Damien Keyeux
- Music by: Vincent Cahay
- Release date: 25 January 2020 (Rotterdam)
- Running time: 91 minutes
- Countries: Belgium; France
- Language: French

Working Girls (French: Filles de joie) is a 2020 Belgian-French drama film directed by Frédéric Fonteyne and Anne Paulicevich. It was selected as the Belgian entry for the Best International Feature Film at the 93rd Academy Awards, but it was not nominated.

At the 11th Magritte Awards, Working Girls was nominated for three awards, including Best Film and Best Screenplay for Paulicevich.

== Plot ==
Three prostitutes who work at the border between Belgium and France bury a body.

== Cast ==
- Sara Forestier as Axelle
- Noémie Lvovsky as Dominique
- Annabelle Lengronne as Conso
- Nicolas Cazalé as Yann
- Jonas Bloquet as Jean-Fi
- Sergi López as Boris
- Gilles Remiche as Marc

== See also ==
- List of submissions to the 93rd Academy Awards for Best International Feature Film
- List of Belgian submissions for the Academy Award for Best International Feature Film
