= Sam Louwyck =

Belgian actor (born 1966)

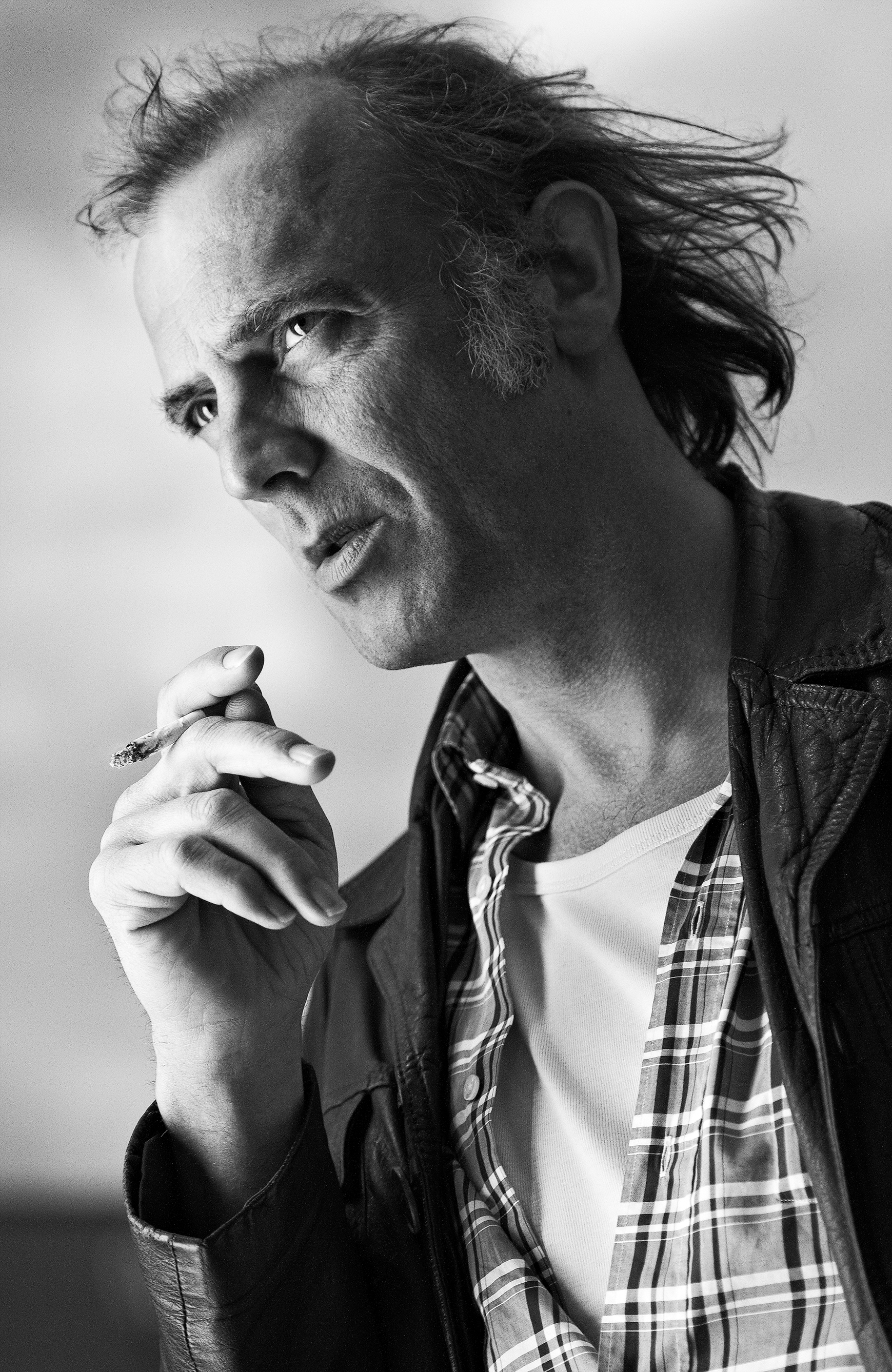
- Born: 1966 (age 59–60); Bruges, Belgium
- Occupations: Actor, dancer, choreographer
- Years active: 1992–present

Sam Louwyck (born 1966) is a Belgian dancer, choreographer and actor.

== Filmography ==
Year	Title	Role	Director	Notes
1992	Great Performances	Changers	Matthew Diamond	TV series (1 episode)
1996	Turnpike	Fool	Tom Barman	Short
2000	50CC		Felix Van Groeningen	Short
2000	Thread		Lieven Van Baelen	Short
2001	Oh My God ?!	The Kidnapper	Christophe Van Rompaey	Short
2003	Any Way the Wind Blows	Windman	Tom Barman (2)	
2004	10 jaar leuven kort		Several	
2004	Carlo	Benny	Michaël R. Roskam	Short
2005	Live/Evil - Evil/Live		Bruno de Almeida	
2007	Ex Drummer	Ivan Van Dorpe	Koen Mortier	
2007	A Day in a Life	Tom	Nicolas Daenens	Short
2007	Salto Mortal	Igor	Jonas Baeckeland	Short
2009	Lost Persons Area	Marcus	Caroline Strubbe	Nominated - Ensor Award for Best Actor
2010	22nd of May	Sam	Koen Mortier (2)	
2010	Paroles		Gilles Coulier	Short
2011	Bullhead	Marc DeKuyper	Michaël R. Roskam (2)	Nominated - Ensor Award for Best Supporting Actor
2011	Portable Life	Truckdriver	Fleur Boonman	
2011	Headlock		Johan Carlsen	
2011	Frontman		Deben Van Dam	Short
2012	The Fifth Season	Pol	Peter Brosens & Jessica Woodworth	Nominated - Magritte Award for Best Actor
2012	Little Black Spiders	Gardener Henrik	Patrice Toye	
2012	Dave	William S. Burroughs	Wim Reygaert	
2012	Le monde nous appartient	Eric	Stephan Streker	
2012	La part sauvage	Albert	Guérin van de Vorst	Short
2012	The Letter	Team Boss	Kenneth Mercken	Short
2012	Que la suite soit douce		Alice De Vestele	Short
2012	Zone Stad	Gianni Lauro	Johan Thiels	TV series (1 episode)
2012	Code 37	John Vervoort	Tim Mielants	TV series (1 episode)
2012	Quiz Me Quick	Manager callcenter	Jan Matthys &	TV series (2 episodes)
2013	The Strange Colour of Your Body's Tears		Hélène Cattet and Bruno Forzani	
2013	Une chanson pour ma mère	Antoine	Joel Franka	
2013	Let Me Survive	Pieter	Eduardo Rossoff	
2013	De weg van alle vlees	Frans	Deben Van Dam (2)	Short
2013	Zinneke		Rémi Allier	Short
2013-16	Eigen Kweek	Patrick & Klaas Museeuw	Joël Vanhoebrouck	TV series (8 episodes)
2014	The Wonders	Wolfgang	Alice Rohrwacher	
2014	40-Love	Gerets	Stéphane Demoustier	
2014	Taram Tarambola	The barman	Maria Castillejo Carmen	Short
2014	Carnage-Terminus		Chris Lequarré	Short
2015	Cowboys	The forger	Thomas Bidegain	
2015	The Ardennes	Joyce	Robin Pront	
2015	Keeper	Maxime's father	Guillaume Senez	Nominated - Magritte Award for Best Supporting Actor
2015	Despite the Night	The man with metallic voice	Philippe Grandrieux	
2015	Belgian Disaster	Robert	Patrick Glotz	
2015	Lobos sucios	Bryan	Simón Casal	
2015	Fallow	The Drifter	Laurent Van Lancker	
2015	Zielbeeld	Boer	Louise De Groef	Short
2015	Vali	Marco	Helvetica, Francois Mercier & Hans Vercauter	Short
2015	Thanatos		Nova van Dijk	Short
2015	Bevergem	Manager	Gilles Coulier (2)	TV series (2 episodes)
2016	Belgica	Rodrigo	Felix Van Groeningen (2)	
2016	Brimstone	Marriage Broker	Martin Koolhoven	
2016	Emperor	Johannes	Lee Tamahori	
2016	Cargo	Jean Broucke	Gilles Coulier (3)	
2016	Baden Baden	Andrew	Rachel Lang	
2016	Monk	Fabian	Ties Schenk	
2016	La trêve	Ronald Vermeiren	Matthieu Donck	TV series (5 episodes)
2019	The Wild Boys	La Capitaine	Bertrand Mandico	
2018	Mandy			
2018	The Bouncer	Jan Dekkers	Julien Leclercq	
2019	Never Grow Old	Dumb-Dumb	Ivan Kavanagh	
2020	Jumbo	Hubert	Zoé Wittock	Nominated - Magritte Award for Best Supporting Actor
2021-2022	Onder Vuur	Patrick Sinnaeve	Joost Wynant en Jonas Baeckeland	
2022	Woman at Sea	Ian		
2024	Meanwhile on Earth	Annick	Jérémy Clapin	
2024	Mr. K		Tallulah H. Schwab	
2024	Night Call	Greg	Michiel Blanchart	
2025	Undecidable	Professor Abraham	Emanuele Bosco	Short

== Theatre ==
Year	Title	Author	Director	Notes
2011	The Seagull	Anton Chekhov	Mikaël Serre	Nouveau Théâtre de Montreuil
