= Gilles Remiche =

Belgian film director and actor (1979–2022)

- Born: 1979; Brussels, Belgium
- Died: 17 April 2022 (aged 42–43)
- Education: University of East London
- Occupations: Director; actor; writer
- Years active: 2006–2022

Gilles Remiche (1979 – 17 April 2022) was a Belgian director and actor. He studied at the University of East London and began working as an assistant director in 2006. He made his acting debut in 2017 with a minor role in The Benefit of the Doubt.

Remiche later co-starred in Madly in Life (2020), a comedy-drama film directed by Ann Sirot and Raphaël Balboni. The film earned him a Magritte Award for Best Supporting Actor.

Remiche died from cancer on 17 April 2022, at the age of 44.

== Selected filmography ==
Year	Title	Role	Notes
2006	Marchands de Miracles		Documentary film
2010	Ghetto Millionaires		Documentary film
2014	The Chance		Documentary film
2017	The Benefit of the Doubt	Vendeur	
2020	Working Girls	Marc	
2020	Madly in Life	Kevin	Magritte Award for Best Supporting Actor
