= Fantine Harduin =

Belgian actress

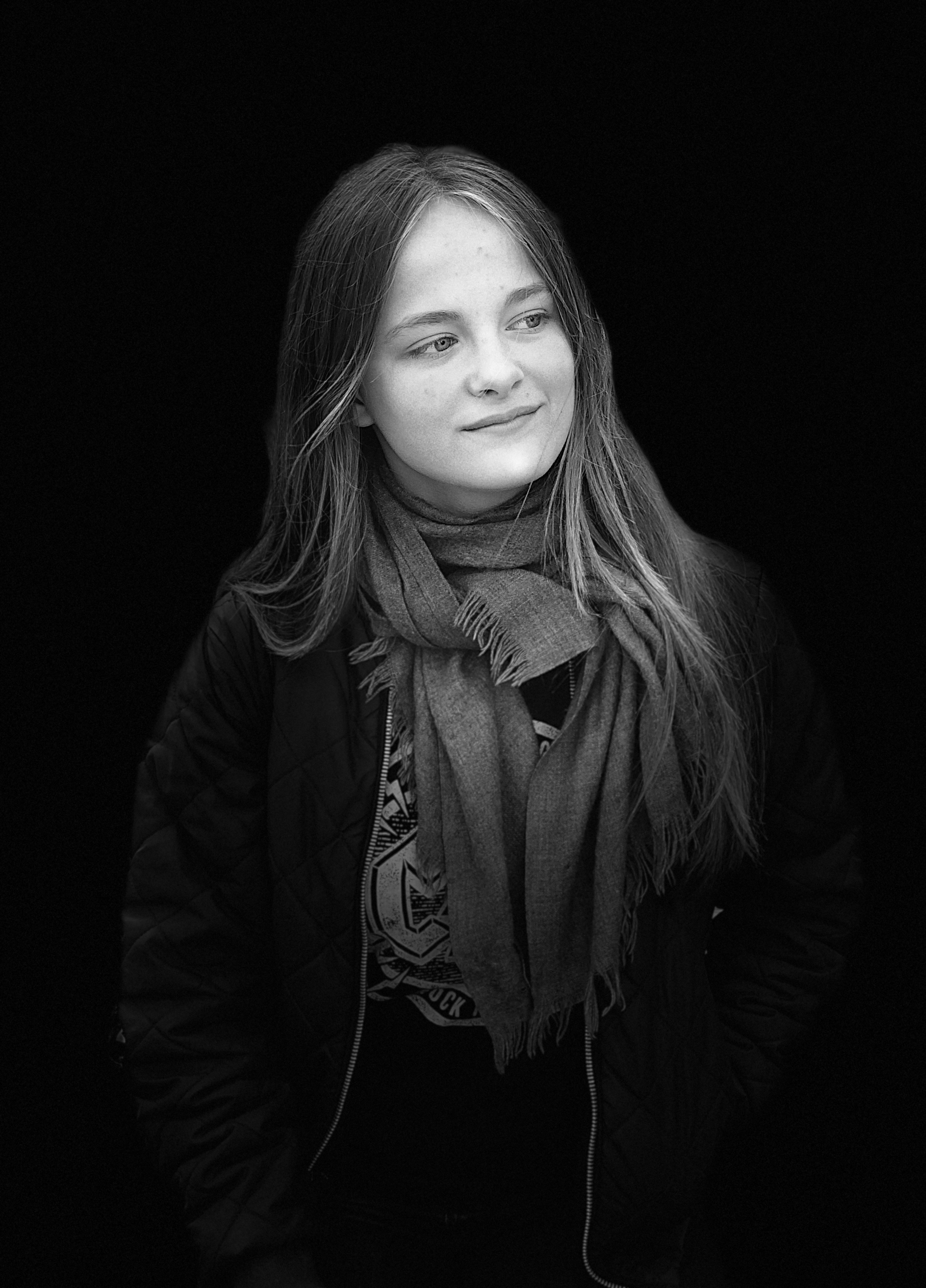
- Born: 23 January 2005 (age 21); Mouscron, Belgium
- Occupation: Actress
- Years active: 2014–present
- Website: www.fantineharduin.be

Fantine Harduin (born 23 January 2005) is a Belgian actress. She is best known for her role as Eve Laurent in the 2017 drama film Happy End, the Austrian entry for the Best Foreign Language Film at the 90th Academy Awards. For her role in the film, she was nominated for a Magritte Award for Most Promising Actress.

She gained public attention when she competed on the Belgian TV show Belgium's Got Talent in 2012.

== Biography ==
Harduin was born in Mouscron, Belgium. She is the daughter of Laurent Harduin.

She presented her talents in mentalism on the Belgian TV talent show Belgium's Got Talent in 2012 at the age of 7.
