= Laura Verlinden =

Belgian actress

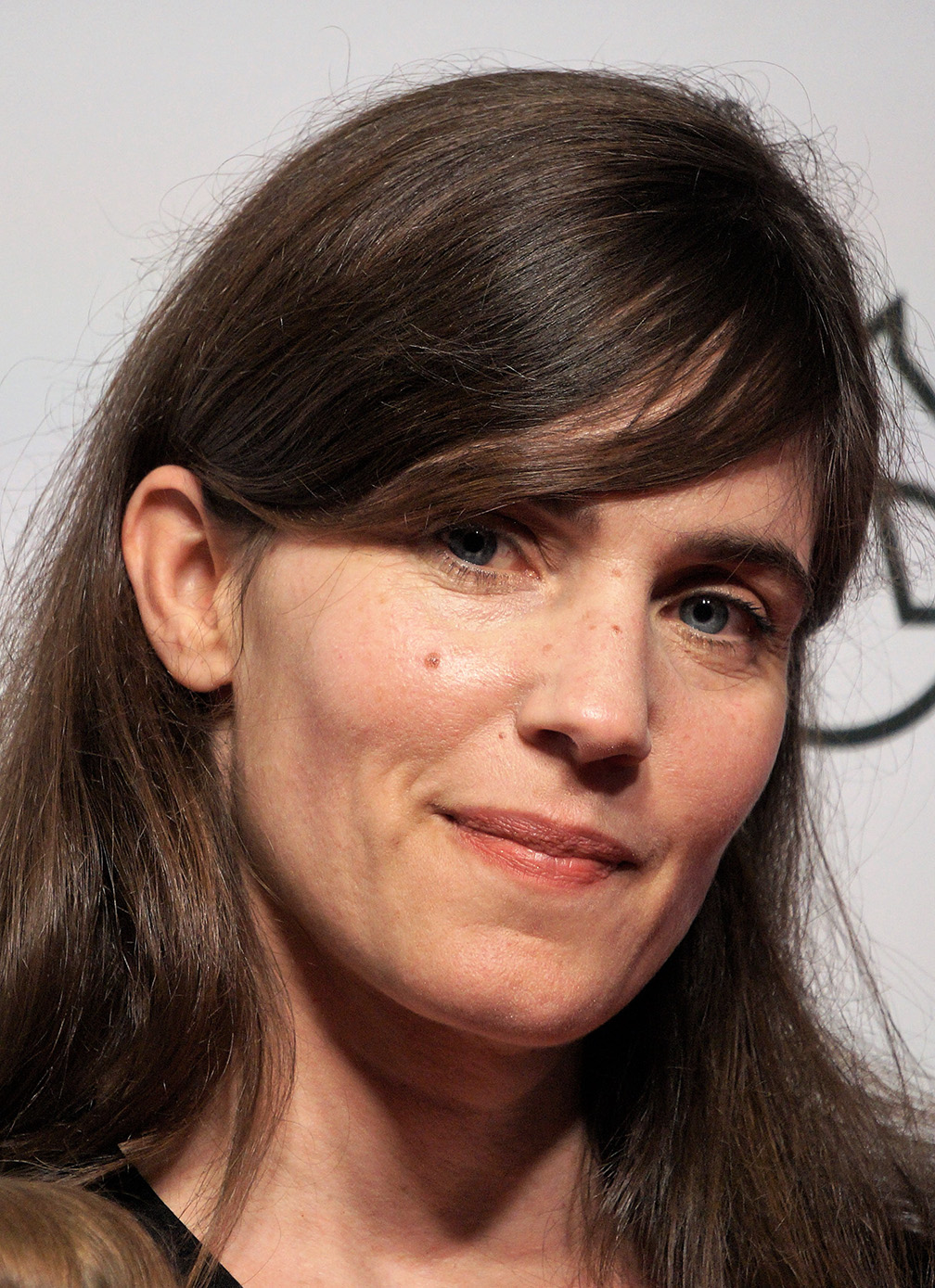
- Verlinden at Film Fest Ghent in 2021
- Born: 1984 (age 41–42)
- Education: Lemmensinstituut
- Occupation: Actress

Laura Verlinden (born 1984) is a Belgian actress. She studied at the Lemmensinstituut in Mechelen. She became known as an actress in the film Ben X and in television series The Emperor of Taste (De smaak van De Keyser). She then acted in the films Le Tout Nouveau Testament (Brand New Testament) and De Laatste Zomer (The Last Summer).

Verlinden played a supporting role in Michael Haneke's 2017 film Happy End. She received the Magritte Award for Best Supporting Actress for her role as a teacher in Un monde (Playground).
