= Employee of the month (program) =

Type of award

The Employee of the Month (EOM) is a type of reward program given out by companies (often to encourage the staff to work harder and more productively). It involves recognizing employees for achieving excellence in their field, and being the best worker across all fields. Traditionally, the award is given out every month, but that is not necessarily the case. The system is popular in North America.

== Criteria ==
One of the main factors of Employee of the Month systems that make them unique is the criteria used to work out who is the "best" worker for a given month. A document called Employee of the Month Selection Criteria suggests the two main criteria are "quality of work standards" and "attitude standards".

Employee of the Month is usually based on performance, quality, attendance, and many other determining factors from previous month(s) based on the associate's role. The "best" worker is then rewarded the following month with the title of "Employee of the Month". During this month, the associate is usually rewarded with a certificate, trophy, or other honors.
