= Laura Wandel =

Belgian film director and screenwriter

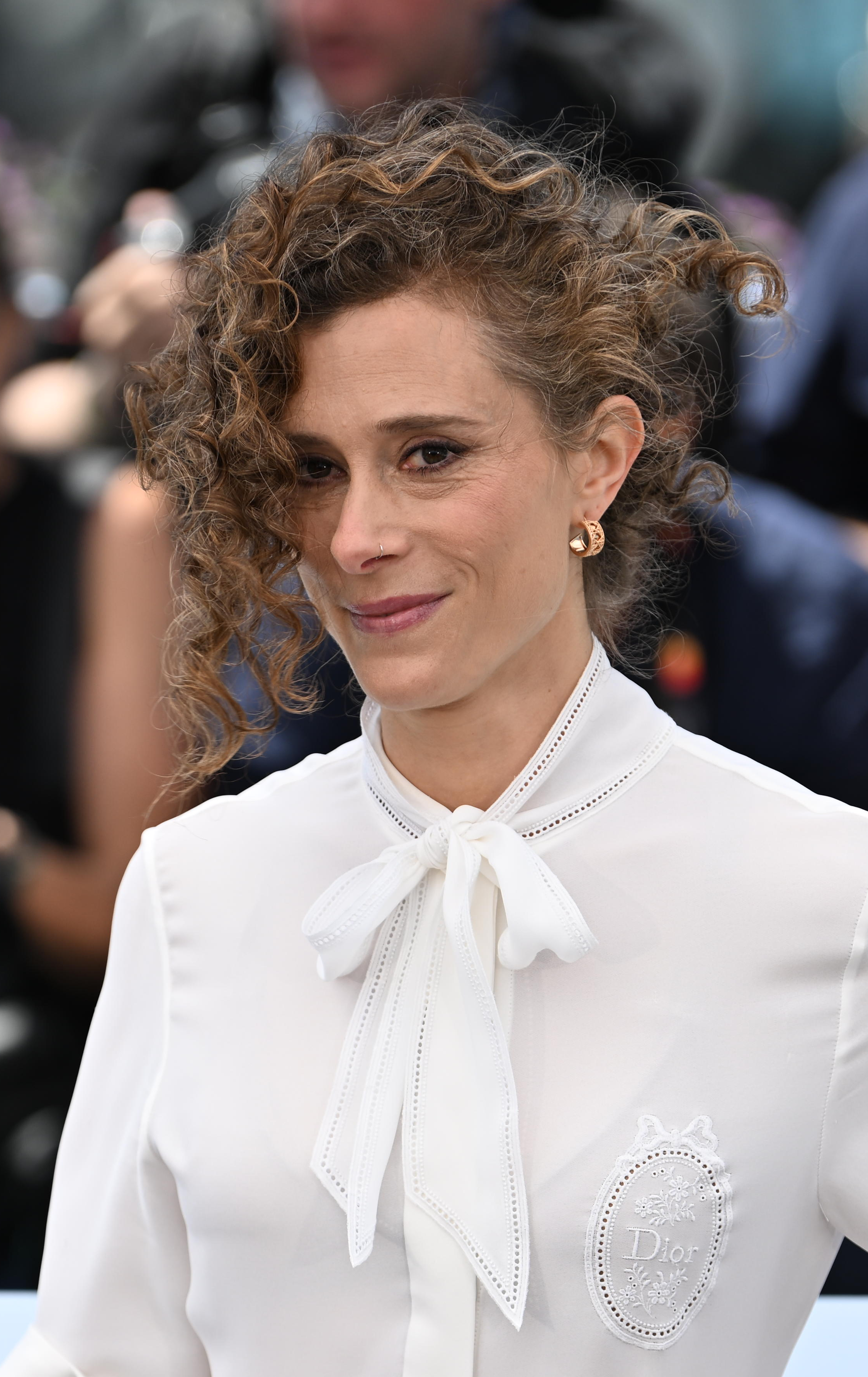
- Wandel in 2026
- Born: 1984 (age 41–42); Brussels, Belgium
- Occupations: Film director; screenwriter
- Years active: 2007–present

Laura Wandel is a Belgian film director and screenwriter, best known for her debut feature film Playground (2021).

== Early life and education ==
Wandel attended the Institut des Arts de Diffusion (IAD) in Ottignies-Louvain-la-Neuve, Belgium and went on to work as a set designer, studio manager and wardrobe manager on several sets.

== Career ==
Wandel made her feature-length debut in 2021 with Playground, a drama film following the life of a seven-year-old girl dealing with the children's and adult's worlds. The film premiered in the Un Certain Regard section at the 74th Cannes Film Festival, where it won the FIPRESCI Prize. It also won the Sutherland Award for Best First Feature at the 65th BFI London Film Festival, and received the André Cavens Award presented by the Belgian Film Critics Association. The film was selected as Belgium's entry for Best International Feature Film at the 94th Academy Awards, making the shortlist of fifteen films in December. It received ten nominations at the 11th Magritte Awards and won seven, including Best Director and Best First Feature Film for Wandel.

Wandel's second feature, Adam's Interest, was developed at the 44th session of the Résidence of the Cannes Film Festival. The film, starring Léa Drucker and Anamaria Vartolomei, had its world premiere as the opening film of the Critics' Week section at the 2025 Cannes Film Festival.

== Other activities ==
Wandel served on the jury of the 2026 Cannes Film Festival, chaired by Park Chan-wook.

== Filmography ==
=== Feature films ===
Year	English Title	Original Title
2021	Playground	Un monde
2025	Adam's Interest	L'intérêt d'Adam

=== Short films ===
- Murs (2007)
- O Négatif (2010); co-directed with Gaëtan D'Agostino
- Les corps étrangers (2014)

== Awards and nominations ==
Award	Year	Category	Work	Result	Ref.
Belgian Film Critics Association	2021	André Cavens Award	Playground	Won	
BFI London Film Festival	2021	Sutherland Trophy	Playground	Won	
Cannes Film Festival	2014	Short Film Palme d'Or	Les corps étrangers	Nominated	
Cannes Film Festival	2021	Prix Un Certain Regard	Playground	Nominated	
Cannes Film Festival	2021	Caméra d'Or	Playground	Nominated	
Cannes Film Festival	2021	FIPRESCI Award	Playground	Won	
Chlotrudis Society for Independent Films	2023	Best Original Screenplay	Playground	Nominated	
Crossing Europe	2022	Audience Award – Best Fiction Film	Playground	Won	
European Film Awards	2021	European Discovery – Prix FIPRESCI	Playground	Nominated	
Festival international du cinéma francophone en Acadie	2021	Best International Fiction Feature Film	Playground	Won	
Göteborg Film Festival	2022	Dragon Award Best International Film	Playground	Won	
Guanajuato International Film Festival	2021	Best International Fiction Feature Film	Playground	Won	
Haifa International Film Festival	2021	Golden Anchor for Best Debut Film	Playground	Won	
International Cinephile Society	2022	Best Debut Feature	Playground	Won	
International Istanbul Film Festival	2022	Young Master Award	Playground	Won	
Magritte Awards	2015	Best Short Film	Les corps étrangers	Nominated	
Magritte Awards	2022	Best Film	Playground	Nominated	
Magritte Awards	2022	Best Director	Playground	Won	
Magritte Awards	2022	Best First Feature Film	Playground	Won	
Magritte Awards	2026	Best Film	Adam's Interest	Nominated	
Magritte Awards	2026	Best Director	Adam's Interest	Nominated	
Magritte Awards	2026	Best Screenplay	Adam's Interest	Nominated	
Nara International Film Festival	2022	Audience Award – International Competition	Playground	Won	
Pingyao International Film Festival	2021	Crouching Tigers – Best Film	Playground	Won	
Santa Barbara International Film Festival	2026	Jeffrey C. Barbakow Award for Best International Feature Film	Adam's Interest	Won	
Sarajevo Film Festival	2021	Special Jury Mention	Playground	Won	
