= Magritte Award for Best Editing =

Belgian film award

- Presented by: Académie André Delvaux
- First award: 2011
- Currently held by: Nicolas Bier, We Believe You (2025)
- Website: lesmagritteducinema.com

The Magritte Award for Best Editing (French: Magritte du meilleur montage) is an award presented annually by the Académie André Delvaux. It is one of the Magritte Awards, which were established to recognize excellence in Belgian cinematic achievements.

The 1st Magritte Awards ceremony was held in 2011 with Matyas Veress receiving the award for his work in Mr. Nobody. As of the 2026 ceremony, Nicolas Bier is the most recent winner in this category for his work in We Believe You.

== Winners and nominees ==
In the list below, winners are listed first in the colored row, followed by the other nominees.

=== 2010s ===
Year	Editor(s)	English title	Original title
2010 (1st)	Matyas Veress	Mr. Nobody	
2010 (1st)	Damien Keyeux	Illegal	Illégal
2010 (1st)	Ludo Troch	Le Concert	
2011 (2nd)	Alain Dessauvage	Bullhead	Rundskop
2011 (2nd)	Marie-Hélène Dozo	The Kid with a Bike	Le Gamin au vélo
2011 (2nd)	Ewin Ryckaert	The Giants	Les Géants
2012 (3rd)	Sophie Vercruysse	Our Children	À perdre la raison
2012 (3rd)	Damien Keyeux	When Pigs Have Wings	Le Cochon de Gaza
2012 (3rd)	Ewin Ryckaert	Approved for Adoption	Couleur de peau: miel
2012 (3rd)	Ludo Troch	One Night	38 témoins
2013 (4th)	Marie-Hélène Dozo	Kinshasa Kids	
2013 (4th)	Sandrine Deegen	Vijay and I	
2013 (4th)	Ewin Ryckaert	Tango libre	
2014 (5th)	Damien Keyeux	The Marchers	La Marche
2014 (5th)	Marie-Hélène Dozo	Two Days, One Night	Deux jours, une nuit
2014 (5th)	Ludo Troch	Not My Type	Pas son genre
2015 (6th)	Anne-Laure Guégan	Alleluia	
2015 (6th)	Yannick Leroy	I'm Dead But I Have Friends	Je suis mort mais j'ai des amis
2015 (6th)	Ewin Ryckaert	All Cats Are Grey	Tous les chats sont gris
2016 (7th)	Julie Brenta	Keeper	
2016 (7th)	Julie Naas	Death by Death	Je me tue à le dire
2016 (7th)	Nicolas Rumpl	Parasol	
2017 (8th)	Sandrine Deegen	Lost in Paris	Paris pieds nus
2017 (8th)	Alain Dessauvage	Racer and the Jailbird	Le Fidèle
2017 (8th)	Jérôme Guiot	A Wedding	Noces
2017 (8th)	Nico Leunen	Home	
2017 (8th)	Ludo Troch	This Is Our Land	Chez nous
2018 (9th)	Julie Brenta	Our Struggles	Nos batailles
2018 (9th)	Bernard Beets	Let the Corpses Tan	Laissez bronzer les cadavres
2018 (9th)	Alain Dessauvage	Girl	
2019 (10th)	Damien Keyeux	Mothers' Instinct	Duelles
2019 (10th)	Marie-Hélène Dozo	Young Ahmed	Le Jeune Ahmed
2019 (10th)	Julie Naas	Lola	Lola vers la mer

=== 2020s ===
Year	Editor(s)	English title	Original title
2020/21 (11th)	Nicolas Rumpl	Playground	Un monde
2020/21 (11th)	Sophie Vercruysse and Raphaël Balboni	Madly in Life	Une vie démente
2020/21 (11th)	Marie-Hélène Dozo	The Restless	Les Intranquilles
2022 (12th)	Nicolas Rumpl	Zero Fucks Given	Rien à foutre
2022 (12th)	Alain Dessauvage	Close	
2022 (12th)	Ewin Ryckaert	Nobody Has to Know	
2023 (13th)	Sophie Vercruysse and Raphaël Balboni	The Experience of Love	Le Syndrome des amours passées
2023 (13th)	Bertrand Conard	I Have Electric Dreams	Tengo sueños eléctricos
2023 (13th)	Bruno Tracq and Bertrand Conard	Owen	Augure
2024 (14th)	Matthieu Jamet-Louis	Night Call	La nuit se traîne
2024 (14th)	Julie Brenta	A Missing Part	Une part manquante
2024 (14th)	Damien Keyeux	Through the Night	Quitter la nuit
