= 8th Magritte Awards =

2018 Belgian film awards ceremony

- Official poster
- Date: 3 February 2018
- Site: Square; Mont des Arts, Brussels, Belgium
- Hosted by: Fabrizio Rongione
- Produced by: Olivier Auclair
- Directed by: Vincent J. Gustin

Highlights
- Best Film: Insyriated
- Most awards: Insyriated (6)
- Most nominations: A Wedding (8)

Television coverage
- Network: RTBF

The 8th Magritte Awards ceremony, presented by the Académie André Delvaux, honored the best films of 2017 in Belgium and took place on 3 February 2018 at the Square in the historic site of Mont des Arts, Brussels, beginning at 8:45 p.m. CET. During the ceremony, the Académie André Delvaux presented Magritte Awards in 22 categories. The ceremony was televised in Belgium by La Deux, after RTBF took over broadcast rights from BeTV. Actress Natacha Régnier presided the ceremony, while Fabrizio Rongione hosted the show for the third time.

The nominees for the 8th Magritte Awards were announced on 11 January 2018. Films with the most nominations were A Wedding with eight, followed by This Is Our Land with seven and Insyriated with six. The winners were announced during the awards ceremony on February 3, 2018. Insyriated won six awards, including Best Film and Best Director for Philippe Van Leeuw. Other multiple winners were A Wedding and Raw with two awards each.

== Winners and nominees ==
=== Best Film ===
- Insyriated
  - Blind Spot (Dode Hoek)
  - Lost in Paris (Paris pieds nus)
  - This Is Our Land (Chez nous)
  - A Wedding (Noces)

=== Best Director ===
- Philippe Van Leeuw – Insyriated
  - Lucas Belvaux – This Is Our Land (Chez nous)
  - Nabil Ben Yadir – Blind Spot (Dode Hoek)
  - Stephan Streker – A Wedding (Noces)

=== Best Actor ===
- Peter Van den Begin – King of the Belgians
  - François Damiens – Just to Be Sure (Ôtez-moi d'un Doute)
  - Jérémie Renier – L'Amant double
  - Matthias Schoenaerts – Racer and the Jailbird (Le Fidèle)

=== Best Actress ===
- Émilie Dequenne – This Is Our Land (Chez nous)
  - Cécile de France – Just to Be Sure (Ôtez-moi d'un Doute)
  - Lucie Debay – King of the Belgians
  - Fiona Gordon – Lost in Paris (Paris pieds nus)

=== Best Supporting Actor ===
- Jean-Benoît Ugeux – Racer and the Jailbird (Le Fidèle)
  - Laurent Capelluto – Don't Tell Her (Faut pas lui dire)
  - Patrick Descamps – This Is Our Land (Chez nous)
  - David Murgia – Blind Spot (Dode Hoek)

=== Best Supporting Actress ===
- Aurora Marion – A Wedding (Noces)
  - Isabelle de Hertogh – 150 Milligrams (La Fille de Brest)
  - Lucie Debay – The Confession (La Confession)
  - Yolande Moreau – A Woman's Life (Une vie)

=== Most Promising Actor ===
- Soufiane Chilah – Blind Spot (Dode Hoek)
  - Mistral Guidotti – Home
  - Baptiste Sornin – Sonar
  - Arieh Worthalter – Past Imperfect (Le Passé devant nous)

=== Most Promising Actress ===
- Maya Dory – Angel (Mon ange)
  - Adriana de Fonseca – Even Lovers Get the Blues
  - Fantine Harduin – Happy End
  - Lena Suijkerbuik – Home

=== Best Screenplay ===
- Insyriated – Philippe Van Leeuw
  - King of the Belgians – Peter Brosens and Jessica Woodworth
  - This Is Our Land (Chez nous) – Lucas Belvaux
  - A Wedding (Noces) – Stephan Streker

=== Best First Feature Film ===
- Don't Tell Her (Faut pas lui dire)
  - Even Lovers Get the Blues
  - Sonar
  - Spit 'n' Split
  - Staying in the Woods (Je suis resté dans les bois)

=== Best Flemish Film ===
- Home
  - Cargo
  - King of the Belgians
  - Racer and the Jailbird (Le Fidèle)

=== Best Foreign Film in Coproduction ===
- Raw (Grave)
  - Graduation (Bacalaureat)
  - I, Daniel Blake
  - Loveless (Nelyubov)

=== Best Cinematography ===
- Insyriated – Virginie Surdej
  - Angel (Mon ange) – Juliette Van Dormael
  - Raw (Grave) – Ruben Impens

=== Best Production Design ===
- Raw (Grave) – Laurie Colson
  - Angel (Mon ange) – Luc Noël
  - A Wedding (Noces) – Catherine Cosme

=== Best Costume Design ===
- A Wedding (Noces) – Sophie Van Den Keybus
  - King of the Belgians – Claudine Tychon
  - Raw (Grave) – Elise Ancion

=== Best Original Score ===
- Insyriated – Jean-Luc Fafchamps
  - Racer and the Jailbird (Le Fidèle) – Raf Keunen
  - This Is Our Land (Chez nous) – Frédéric Vercheval

=== Best Sound ===
- Insyriated – Paul Heymans and Alek Gosse and Chadi Roukoz
  - A Wedding (Noces) – Olivier Ronval and Michel Schillings
  - Sonar – Félix Blume, Benoît Biral and Frédéric Meert

=== Best Editing ===
- Lost in Paris (Paris pieds nus) – Sandrine Deegen
  - Home – Nico Leunen
  - Racer and the Jailbird (Le Fidèle) – Alain Dessauvage
  - This Is Our Land (Chez nous) – Ludo Troch
  - A Wedding (Noces) – Jérôme Guiot

=== Best Fiction Short Film ===
- With Thelma (Avec Thelma)
  - Kapitalistis
  - Little Hands (Les Petites Mains)
  - The Summer Movie (Le Film de l'été)

=== Best Animated Short Film ===
- Le Lion et le Singe
  - 69 sec
  - The Unicorn (La Licorne)
  - The Wind in the Reeds (Le Vent dans les roseaux)

=== Best Documentary Film ===
- Burning Out
  - The Belgian Road to Cannes (La Belge Histoire du festival de Cannes)
  - Children of Chance (Enfants du hasard)
  - Still Alive (Rester vivants)

=== Honorary Magritte Award ===
- Sandrine Bonnaire

== Films with multiple nominations and awards ==
The following fourteen films received multiple nominations.

- Eight: A Wedding
- Seven: This Is Our Land
- Six: Insyriated
- Five: King of the Belgians, Racer and the Jailbird
- Four: Blind Spot, Home, Raw
- Three: Angel, Lost in Paris, Sonar
- Two: Don't Tell Her, Even Lovers Get the Blues, Just to Be Sure

The following three films received multiple awards.

- Six: Insyriated
- Two: Raw and A Wedding

== See also ==
- 43rd César Awards
- 23rd Lumières Awards
- 2017 in film
