= 12th Magritte Awards =

2023 Belgian film awards ceremony

- Official poster
- Date: 4 March 2023
- Site: Théâtre National; Marais-Jacqmain, Brussels, Belgium
- Hosted by: Patrick Ridremont

Highlights
- Best Film: Nobody Has to Know
- Most awards: Close (7)
- Most nominations: Close (10)

Television coverage
- Network: RTBF

The 12th Magritte Awards ceremony, presented by the Académie André Delvaux, honored the best films of 2022 in Belgium. It took place on 4 March 2023, at the Théâtre National, in the historic site of Marais-Jacqmain, Brussels. During the ceremony, the Académie André Delvaux presented Magritte Awards in 23 categories. The ceremony was televised in Belgium by La Trois. Actress Lubna Azabal presided the ceremony, while director Patrick Ridremont hosted the show for the first time.

The nominees for the 12th Magritte Awards were announced on 10 February 2023. Films with the most nominations were Close with ten, followed by Zero Fucks Given with nine and Nobody Has to Know with seven. The winners were announced during the awards ceremony on 4 March 2023. Nobody Has to Know won two awards, including Best Film and Best Director for Bouli Lanners. Other multiple winners were Close with seven, Zero Fucks Given with three, and The Night of the 12th with two.

== Winners and nominees ==
=== Best Film ===
- Nobody Has to Know
  - Animals
  - The Hive (La Ruche)
  - Tori and Lokita (Tori et Lokita)
  - Zero Fucks Given (Rien à foutre)

=== Best Director ===
- Bouli Lanners – Nobody Has to Know
  - Nabil Ben Yadir – Animals
  - Jean-Pierre and Luc Dardenne – Tori and Lokita (Tori et Lokita)
  - Julie Lecoustre and Emmanuel Marre – Zero Fucks Given (Rien à foutre)

=== Best Actor ===
- Bouli Lanners – The Night of the 12th (La Nuit du 12)
  - Aboubakr Bensaihi – Rebel
  - Soufiane Chilah – Animals
  - Benoît Poelvoorde – Inexorable
  - Jérémie Renier – L'Ennemi

=== Best Actress ===
- Virginie Efira – Paris Memories (Revoir Paris)
  - Lubna Azabal – Rebel
  - Lucie Debay – Lucie Loses Her Horse (Lucie perd son cheval)
  - Babetida Sadjo – Juwaa

=== Best Supporting Actor ===
- Igor Van Dessel – Close
  - Mehdi Dehbi – Boy from Heaven (صبي من الجنة)
  - Tijmen Govaerts – Tori and Lokita (Tori et Lokita)
  - Jérémie Renier – Novembre

=== Best Supporting Actress ===
- Émilie Dequenne – Close
  - Veerle Baetens – Singing Jailbirds (À l'ombre des filles)
  - Anne Coesens – By Your Side (À la folie)
  - Mara Taquin – Zero Fucks Given (Rien à foutre)

=== Most Promising Actor ===
- Eden Dambrine – Close
  - Gustav De Waele – Close
  - Gianni Guettaf – Animals
  - Pablo Schils – Tori and Lokita (Tori et Lokita)

=== Most Promising Actress ===
- Sophie Breyer – The Hive (La Ruche)
  - Elsa Houben – Dark Heart of the Forest (Le Cœur noir des forêts)
  - Joely Mbundu – Tori and Lokita (Tori et Lokita)
  - Mara Taquin – The Hive (La Ruche)

=== Best Screenplay ===
- Close – Lukas Dhont and Angelo Tijssens
  - Animals – Nabil Ben Yadir and Antoine Cuypers
  - Nobody Has to Know – Bouli Lanners
  - Zero Fucks Given (Rien à foutre) – Julie Lecoustre and Emmanuel Marre

=== Best First Feature Film ===
- Zero Fucks Given (Rien à foutre)
  - Aya
  - The Hive (La Ruche)
  - Yuku and the Himalayan Flower (Yuku et la Fleur de l'Himalaya)

=== Best Flemish Film ===
- Close
  - The Eight Mountains (Le otto montagne)
  - Nowhere
  - Rebel

=== Best Foreign Film in Coproduction ===
- The Night of the 12th (La Nuit du 12)
  - Clara Sola
  - Madeleine Collins
  - Singing Jailbirds (À l'ombre des filles)
  - Where Is Anne Frank

=== Best Cinematography ===
- Close – Frank van den Eeden
  - Inexorable – Manuel Dacosse
  - Zero Fucks Given (Rien à foutre) – Olivier Boonjing

=== Best Production Design ===
- Close – Eve Martin
  - Nobody Has to Know – Paul Rouschop
  - Zero Fucks Given (Rien à foutre) – Anna Falguères

=== Best Costume Design ===
- Zero Fucks Given (Rien à foutre) – Prunelle Rulens
  - Close – Manu Verschueren
  - Nobody Has to Know – Élise Ancion

=== Best Original Score ===
- Rebel – Hannes De Maeyer, Oum, Aboubakr Bensaihi
  - The Hive (La Ruche) – Fabian Fiorini
  - Inexorable – Vincent Cahay

=== Best Sound ===
- Animals – François Aubinet, Mathieu Cox, Pierre Mertens, David Vranken, Philippe Van Leer
  - The Night of the 12th (La Nuit du 12) – François Maurel, Olivier Mortier, Luc Thomas
  - Nobody Has to Know – Marc Bastien, Thomas Gauder, Etienne Carton, Cameron Mercer, Philippe Van Leer

=== Best Editing ===
- Zero Fucks Given (Rien à foutre) – Nicolas Rumpl
  - Close – Alain Dessauvage
  - Nobody Has to Know – Ewin Ryckaert

=== Best Fiction Short Film ===
- Ma Gueule – Gregory Carnol, Thibaut Wohlfahrt
  - Drame 71 – Guillaume Lion
  - Oysters (Les Huîtres) – Maïa Descamps
  - Patanegra – Méryl Fortunat-Rossi

=== Best Animated Short Film ===
- Cuddle (Câline) – Margot Reumont
  - The Big Tantrum (Grosse Colère) – Célia Tisserant and Arnaud Demuynck
  - Inglorious Liaisons (Les Liaisons Foireuses) – Chloé Alliez and Violette Delvoye
  - The Summer Holidays (Les Grandes Vacances) – Vincent Patar and Stéphane Aubier

=== Best Documentary Film ===
- Soy libre – Laure Portier
  - Dreaming Walls – Amélie van Elmbt and Maya Duverdier
  - Empire of Silence (L'Empire du silence) – Thierry Michel
  - The End of Innocence (Petites) – Pauline Beugnies
  - I Am Chance – Marc-Henri Wajnberg

=== Best Documentary Short Film ===
- Arbres – Jean-Benoît Ugeux
  - Call It the Burning (On la nomme la brûlure) – Bénédicte Liénard and Mary Jimenez
  - Dernier Voyage au Laos – Manon Saysouk
  - Masks (Masques) – Olivier Smolders

=== Honorary Magritte Award ===
- Agnès Jaoui

== Films with multiple nominations and awards ==
The following eight films received multiple nominations.

- Ten: Close
- Nine: Zero Fucks Given
- Seven: Nobody Has to Know
- Six: Animals
- Five: The Hive, Tori and Lokita
- Four: Rebel
- Three: Inexorable, The Night of the 12th
- Two: Singing Jailbirds

The following four films received multiple awards.

- Seven: Close
- Three: Zero Fucks Given
- Two: Nobody Has to Know, The Night of the 12th

== See also ==
- 2022 in film
- 48th César Awards
- 28th Lumières Awards
