= 5th Magritte Awards =

2015 Belgian film awards ceremony

- Official poster
- Date: 7 February 2015
- Site: Square; Mont des Arts, Brussels, Belgium
- Hosted by: Charlie Dupont
- Produced by: José Bouquiaux
- Directed by: Vincent J. Gustin

Highlights
- Best Film: Two Days, One Night
- Most awards: Two Days, One Night; Marina and Not My Type (3)
- Most nominations: Two Days, One Night (9)

Television coverage
- Network: BeTV

The 5th Magritte Awards ceremony, presented by the Académie André Delvaux, honored the best films of 2014 in Belgium and took place on 7 February 2015 at the Square in the historic site of Mont des Arts, Brussels beginning at 7:50 p.m. CET. During the ceremony, the Académie André Delvaux presented Magritte Awards in 21 categories. The ceremony was televised in Belgium by BeTV. Actor François Damiens presided the ceremony, while Charlie Dupont hosted the show for the first time.

The nominees for the 5th Magritte Awards were announced on 7 January 2015. Films with the most nominations were Two Days, One Night with nine, followed by Not My Type with eight. The winners were announced during the awards ceremony on 7 February 2015. Two Days, One Night won three awards, including Best Film and Best Director for Jean-Pierre and Luc Dardenne. Other multiple winners were Marina and Not My Type also with three awards each, and The Marchers with two.

== Winners and nominees ==
=== Best Film ===
- Two Days, One Night (Deux jours, une nuit)
  - Henri
  - The Marchers (La Marche)
  - Not My Type (Pas son genre)
  - Scouting for Zebras (Les Rayures du zèbre)

=== Best Director ===
- Jean-Pierre and Luc Dardenne – Two Days, One Night (Deux jours, une nuit)
  - Lucas Belvaux – Not My Type (Pas son genre)
  - Nabil Ben Yadir – The Marchers (La Marche)
  - Yolande Moreau – Henri

=== Best Flemish Film ===
- Marina
  - I'm the Same, I'm an Other
  - Labyrinthus
  - Welcome Home

=== Best Foreign Film in Coproduction ===
- Minuscule: Valley of the Lost Ants (Minuscule - La vallée des fourmis perdues)
  - Playing Dead (Je fais le mort)
  - A Promise
  - Saint Laurent
  - Violette

=== Best Screenplay ===
- Not My Type (Pas son genre) – Lucas Belvaux
  - Henri – Yolande Moreau
  - The Marchers (La Marche) – Nabil Ben Yadir
  - Two Days, One Night (Deux jours, une nuit) – Jean-Pierre and Luc Dardenne

=== Best Actor ===
- Fabrizio Rongione – Two Days, One Night (Deux jours, une nuit)
  - François Damiens – Playing Dead (Je fais le mort)
  - Bouli Lanners – Lulu in the Nude (Lulu femme nue)
  - Benoît Poelvoorde – Scouting for Zebras (Les Rayures du zèbre)

=== Best Actress ===
- Émilie Dequenne – Not My Type (Pas son genre)
  - Manah Depauw – Welcome Home
  - Pauline Étienne – Tokyo Fiancée
  - Déborah François – Maestro
  - Ben Riga – I'll Bury You (Je te survivrai)

=== Best Supporting Actor ===
- Jérémie Renier – Saint Laurent
  - François Damiens – Suzanne
  - Olivier Gourmet – The Marchers (La Marche)
  - David Murgia – I'll Bury You (Je te survivrai)

=== Best Supporting Actress ===
- Lubna Azabal – The Marchers (La Marche)
  - Anne Coesens – Not My Type (Pas son genre)
  - Christelle Cornil – Two Days, One Night (Deux jours, une nuit)
  - Catherine Salée – Two Days, One Night (Deux jours, une nuit)

=== Most Promising Actor ===
- Marc Zinga – Scouting for Zebras (Les Rayures du zèbre)
  - Corentin Lobet – Playing Dead (Je fais le mort)
  - Benjamin Ramon – Tokyo Anyway
  - Matteo Simoni – Marina

=== Most Promising Actress ===
- Ambre Grouwels – Baby Balloon
  - Evelien Bosmans – Marina
  - Hande Kodja – Rosenn
  - Emilie Maréchal – Tokyo Anyway

=== Best Cinematography ===
- The Strange Color of Your Body's Tears (L'Étrange Couleur des larmes de ton corps) – Manuel Dacosse
  - The Taste of Blueberries (Le Goût des myrtilles) – Philippe Guilbert and Virginie Saint-Martin
  - Tokyo Fiancée – Hichame Alaouié

=== Best Sound ===
- Not My Type (Pas son genre) – Henri Morelle and Luc Thomas
  - The Strange Color of Your Body's Tears (L'Étrange Couleur des larmes de ton corps) – Dan Bruylandt, Mathieu Cox, and Olivier Thys
  - Two Days, One Night (Deux jours, une nuit) – Benoît De Clerck and Thomas Gauder

=== Best Production Design ===
- Marina – Hubert Pouille
  - The Strange Color of Your Body's Tears (L'Étrange Couleur des larmes de ton corps) – Julia Irribarria
  - Two Days, One Night (Deux jours, une nuit) – Igor Gabriel

=== Best Costume Design ===
- Marina – Catherine Marchand
  - The Strange Color of Your Body's Tears (L'Étrange Couleur des larmes de ton corps) – Jackye Fauconnier
  - Tokyo Fiancée – Claire Dubien

=== Best Original Score ===
- Puppylove – Soldout (David Baboulis and Charlotte Maison)
  - Henri – Wim Willaert
  - Not My Type (Pas son genre) – Frédéric Vercheval

=== Best Editing ===
- The Marchers (La Marche) – Damien Keyeux
  - Not My Type (Pas son genre) – Ludo Troch
  - Two Days, One Night (Deux jours, une nuit) – Marie-Hélène Dozo

=== Best Short Film ===
- La Bûche de Noel
  - En attendant le dégel
  - Foreign Bodies (Les Corps étrangers)
  - La Part de l'ombre

=== Best Documentary Film ===
- When I Will Be Dictator (Quand je serai dictateur)
  - L'Âge de raison, le cinéma des frères Dardenne
  - Rwanda, la vie après
  - Waiting for August

=== Honorary Magritte Award ===
- Pierre Richard

=== Audience Award for Best First Feature Film ===
- I'll Bury You (Je te survivrai)
  - Marbie, star de Couillu-les-Deux-Églises
  - Vertigo of Possibilities (Le Vertige des possibles)

== Films with multiple nominations and awards ==
The following twelve films received multiple nominations.

- Nine: Two Days, One Night
- Eight: Not My Type
- Six: The Marchers
- Five: Marina
- Four: Henri, The Strange Color of Your Body's Tears
- Three: I'll Bury You, Playing Dead, Scouting for Zebras, Tokyo Fiancée
- Two: Tokyo Anyway, Welcome Home

The following four films received multiple awards.

- Three: Two Days, One Night, Marina and Not My Type
- Two: The Marchers

== See also ==
- 40th César Awards
- 20th Lumières Awards
- 2014 in film
