= Nobody Has to Know (film) =

2021 film directed by Bouli Lanners

- Film poster
- Directed by: Bouli Lanners
- Written by: Bouli Lanners; Stéphane Malandrin
- Produced by: Jacques-Henri Bronckart
- Starring: Michelle Fairley; Bouli Lanners; Cal MacAninch
- Cinematography: Frank van den Eeden
- Edited by: Ewin Ryckaert
- Release date: 12 September 2021 (Toronto)
- Running time: 99 minutes
- Countries: Belgium; France; United Kingdom
- Languages: French; English

Nobody Has to Know is a 2021 drama film written and directed by Bouli Lanners. The film stars Michelle Fairley, Lanners, Cal MacAninch, Clovis Cornillac, and Julian Glover. It follows Philippe Haubin, a middle-aged man who suffered a stroke, causing him to lose his memory. Millie MacPherson, who takes care of him, tells him falsely that they were secretly in love before his accident.

The film had its world premiere at the 2021 Toronto International Film Festival. At the 12th Magritte Awards, Nobody Has to Know received seven nominations, winning Best Film and Best Director for Lanners.

== Cast ==
- Michelle Fairley as Millie MacPherson
- Bouli Lanners as Philippe Haubin, called Phil
- Cal MacAninch as Peter
- Clovis Cornillac as Benoît Haubin
- Julian Glover as Angus
- Andrew Still as Brian
- Donald Douglas as Nigel's man handler

== Response ==
=== Critical reception ===
On review aggregator website AlloCiné, the film holds an average score of four stars out of five, based on a survey of 20 reviews. On Rotten Tomatoes, it holds an 82% rating based on 11 critic reviews, with an average rating of 7.9/10.

=== Accolades ===
Award / Film Festival	Category	Recipients and nominees	Result
Chicago International Film Festival	Best Film		Nominated
Chicago International Film Festival	Best Actor	Bouli Lanners	Won
Chicago International Film Festival	Best Actress	Michelle Fairley	Won
La Roche-sur-Yon Film Festival	Best Film		Nominated
Magritte Awards	Best Film		Won
Magritte Awards	Best Director	Bouli Lanners	Won
Magritte Awards	Best Screenplay	Bouli Lanners	Nominated
Magritte Awards	Best Production Design	Paul Rouschop	Nominated
Magritte Awards	Best Costume Design	Élise Ancion	Nominated
Magritte Awards	Best Sound	Marc Bastien et al.	Nominated
Magritte Awards	Best Editing	Ewin Ryckaert	Nominated
Ostend Film Festival	Best Cinematography	Frank van den Eeden	Won
