= Blind Spot (2017 film) =

2017 film

- Film poster
- Directed by: Nabil Ben Yadir
- Written by: Nabil Ben Yadir; Laurent Brandenbourger
- Produced by: Nabil Ben Yadir; Peter Bouckaert; Benoit Roland
- Starring: Peter Van den Begin; Soufiane Chilah; Jan Decleir
- Cinematography: Robrecht Heyvaert
- Edited by: Dieter Diependaele
- Music by: Senjan Jansen
- Distributed by: Kinepolis Distribution
- Release date: 25 January 2017
- Running time: 85 minutes
- Country: Belgium
- Languages: French; Dutch

Blind Spot (Dutch: Dode Hoek) is a 2017 Belgian thriller film directed by Nabil Ben Yadir. It stars Peter Van Den Begin as Jan Verbeek, an uncompromising police officer from Antwerp. The film was written by Laurent Brandenbourger and Ben Yadir, who also produced alongside Peter Bouckaert and Benoit Roland.

It was screened at the Beaune International Film Festival on 30 March 2017, where it competed for the Grand Prix. At the 8th Magritte Awards, Blind Spot received four nominations, including Best Film and Best Director for Ben Yadir, winning Most Promising Actor for Chilah.

== Cast ==
- Peter Van Den Begin as Jan Vorbeek
- Soufiane Chilah as Dries Ben Haïfa
- Jan Decleir as Voorzitter
- David Murgia as Axel

== Critical reception ==
On review aggregator website AlloCiné, the film holds an average score of three stars out of five, based on a survey of 20 reviews.

== Accolades ==
Award / Film Festival	Category	Recipients and nominees	Result
Beaune International Film Festival	Grand Prix		Nominated
Ensor Awards	Best International Film		Nominated
Magritte Awards	Best Film		Nominated
Magritte Awards	Best Director	Nabil Ben Yadir	Nominated
Magritte Awards	Best Supporting Actor	David Murgia	Nominated
Magritte Awards	Most Promising Actor	Soufiane Chilah	Won
