= This Is Our Land =

- Theatrical release poster
- Directed by: Lucas Belvaux
- Screenplay by: Lucas Belvaux; Jérôme Leroy
- Produced by: David Frenkel; Patrick Quinet
- Starring: Émilie Dequenne; André Dussollier; Guillaume Gouix; Catherine Jacob; Anne Marivin
- Cinematography: Pierric Gantelmi d'Ille
- Edited by: Ludo Troch
- Music by: Frédéric Vercheval
- Production companies: Synecdoche; Artémis Productions; France 3 Cinéma; RTBF
- Distributed by: Le Pacte
- Release dates: 30 January 2017 (IFFR); 22 February 2017 (France)
- Running time: 117 minutes
- Countries: France; Belgium
- Language: French
- Budget: $5.8 million
- Box office: $2.2 million

This Is Our Land (French: Chez nous) is a 2017 French-Belgian drama film directed by Lucas Belvaux and starring Émilie Dequenne, André Dussollier and Guillaume Gouix. It received seven nominations at the 8th Magritte Awards, including Best Film and Best Director for Belvaux, and won Best Actress for Dequenne.

== Plot ==
Pauline is a home nurse who lives with her children, Tom and Lili, and her father Jacques, a retired worker and former member of the French Communist Party, in a small village in Pas-de-Calais, in northern France. Pauline belongs to a working-class family and has to worry about supporting the whole family on her only salary.

Pauline is much loved by her patients, thanks to her open and caring character. Doctor Philippe Berthier, a right-wing physician who had assisted Pauline's mother before she died, approaches the woman to the ideas of a nationalist party led by Agnès Dorgelle, who proposes Pauline as candidate for mayor of her village.

Pauline is reunited with Stéphane Stankowiak, an old friend from school, who trains the woman's son's soccer team. Pauline is unaware that Stéphane plays in a group of skinheads thugs, from which he gradually tries to move away so as not to damage the woman's election campaign. Berthier invites Stéphane to move away permanently from Pauline, threatening to disclose his subversive militancy and his past as a hitter in the service of Dorgelle's party.

When Pauline reveals to Jacques that she is running for mayor with a far-right party, he chases her away, saying he doesn't want to be the father of a fascist in any way. Pauline's patients are divided: the most conservative promise all their support, while the most progressive push her away. The same situation occurs among the nurse's friends: the racist Nathalie joins her staff, also promoting a fake news website against refugees who have settled in France in order to increase consensus, while Nada, French by birth but daughter of Slavic parents, accuses her of being only the pawn of a pack of extremists.

Fearing for Pauline's safety, Stéphane asks some of his comrades to follow her secretly to avoid being attacked. However, the situation deteriorates and the skinheads seriously injure a Pauline protester with a firearm. When the girl tries to help the wounded, she is badly driven out by all the inhabitants of a popular apartment building. Desperate for being dismissed from father, friends and patients, and suspicious of Stéphane's gradual physical estrangement, Pauline visits Berthier, asking if he has anything to do with all this. Berthier reveals Stéphane's violent past to Pauline, asking her to choose between politics or love: Pauline chooses to be with Stéphane and to abandon the party, withdrawing from the mayor race and being promptly replaced by Nathalie.

Reunited with Jacques, Pauline goes out with her children, her father and Stéphane to the stadium, having fun for the duration of the game. When Stéphane lends his cellphone to Lili for a few seconds to see the selfies taken during the match, the girl mistakenly shows the mother some photos taken by Stéphane and his comrades in which they threaten and mistreat a couple of refugees. Horrified by the pictures, Pauline flings herself on Stéphane, angrily beating him, until Jacques and the children manage to stop her fury and bring her home.

== Cast ==
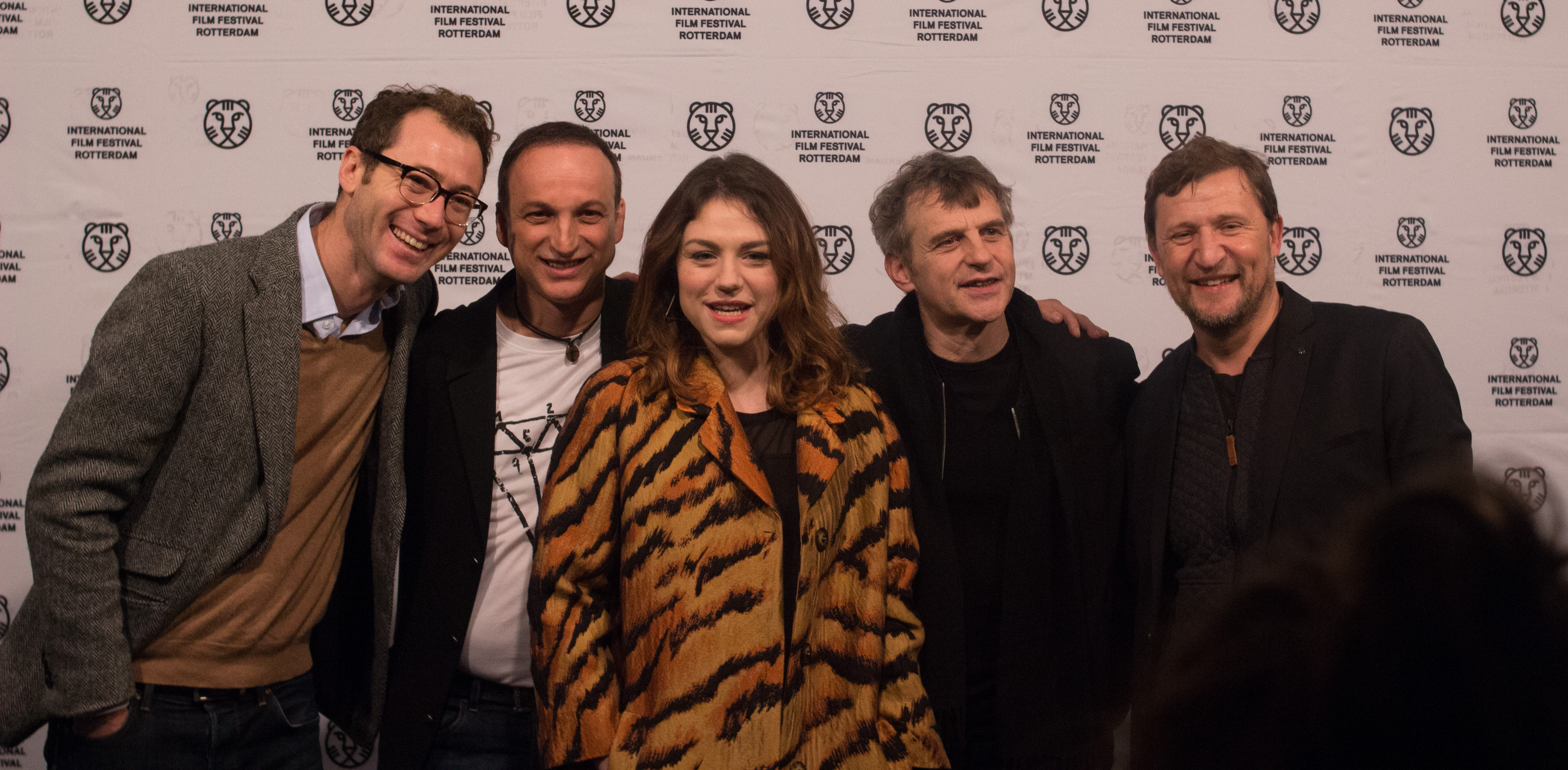
Émilie Dequenne (center), Lucas Belvaux (to her left) and crew at the IFFR 2017

- Émilie Dequenne as Pauline Duhez
- André Dussollier as Philippe Berthier
- Guillaume Gouix as Stéphane Stankowiak "Stanko"
- Catherine Jacob as Agnès Dorgelle
- Anne Marivin as Nathalie Leclerc
- Patrick Descamps as Jacques Duhez
- Charlotte Talpaert as Nada Belisha
- Mateo Debaets as Tom
- Coline Marcourt as Lili
- Corentin Lobet as Yo
- Thibault Roux as Max
- Michel Ferracci as Dominique Orsini
- Stéphane Caillard as Victoire Vasseur
- Cyril Descours as Jean-Baptiste Verhaeghe
- Julien Roy as Bernard Tovi
- Jean-Louis Sbille as Monsieur Biagi

== Production ==
Filming began on 10 May 2016 in Nord-Pas-de-Calais in Lens, Béthune, Hersin-Coupigny and Bruay-la-Buissière and was expected to complete on 4 July.

== Reception ==
=== Critical reception ===
On review aggregator website Rotten Tomatoes, the film holds an approval rating of 75%, based on 12 reviews, and an average rating of 6.2/10. <On Metacritic, the film has a weighted average score of 61 out of 100, based on 8 critics, indicating "generally favorable reviews".

=== Controversy ===
The film was slated to be released two months before the first round of the 2017 presidential elections in France and directly targets the National Front. The character of Catherine Jacob is said to strongly resemble Marine Le Pen and members of the political party saw the film as an affront. Steeve Briois, the FN mayor of Hénin-Beaumont, tweeted: "Poor Marine Le Pen, which is caricatured by this tobacco pot of Catherine Jacob. A damn turnip in perspective!" Florian Philippot, another member of the FN declared: "According to the trailer that I saw [...], it looks like a nice turnip, but, beyond the quality of the film, I find it really scandalous that in the countryside Presidential election, I believe precisely to two months of the vote, we allow in French screening rooms a film that is clearly anti-National Front. [...] It disturbs me on behalf of Catherine Jacob. I was a fan of Catherine Jacob. There, I love her very much, but for me she is spoiled. Why? For some money, for a César, for a little chocolate medal that will be given, for service rendered to the system ?"

== Accolades ==
Award / Film Festival	Category	Recipients and nominees	Result
Istanbul International Film Festival	Golden Tulip		Nominated
Magritte Awards	Best Film		Nominated
Magritte Awards	Best Director	Lucas Belvaux	Nominated
Magritte Awards	Best Actress	Émilie Dequenne	Won
Magritte Awards	Best Supporting Actor	Patrick Descamps	Nominated
Magritte Awards	Best Screenplay	Lucas Belvaux	Nominated
Magritte Awards	Best Original Score	Frédéric Vercheval	Nominated
Magritte Awards	Best Editing	Ludo Troch	Nominated
Rotterdam International Film Festival	Big Screen Award		Nominated
