= Michelle Fairley =

Actress from Northern Ireland

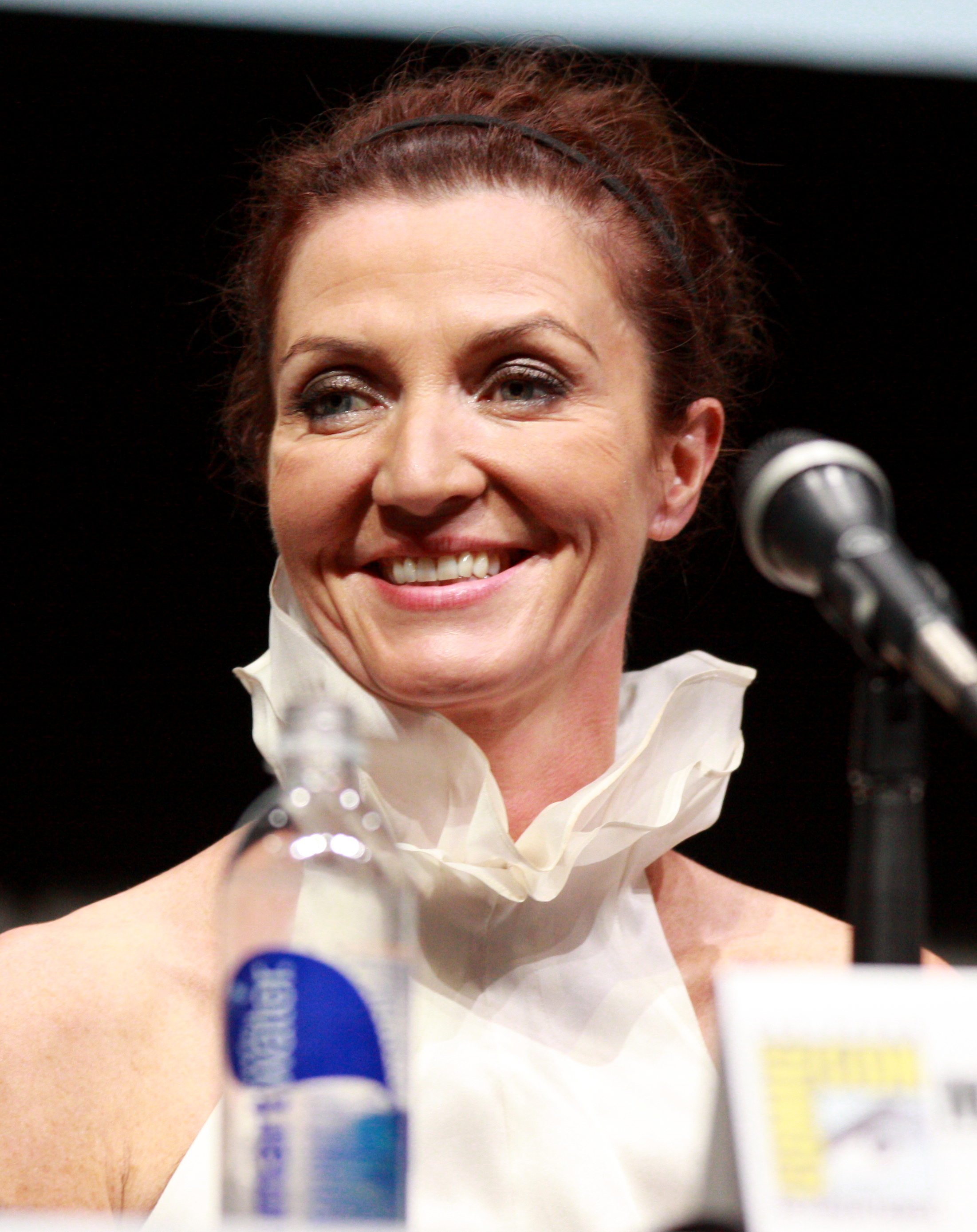
- Fairley in 2013
- Born: 1963 or 1964 (age 62–63); Coleraine, County Londonderry, Northern Ireland
- Occupation: Actress
- Years active: 1986–present

Michelle Fairley is an actress from Northern Ireland. She is best known for playing Catelyn Stark in the HBO series Game of Thrones (2011–2013). She has since appeared in the USA Network series Suits (2013), the Fox series 24: Live Another Day (2014), the RTÉ miniseries Rebellion (2016), the science fiction series The Feed (2019), the Sky Atlantic crime drama Gangs of London (2020–present), and the Netflix series How to Get to Heaven from Belfast (2026).

== Early life ==
Fairley was born in Coleraine to parents Brian and Teresa Fairley, the second eldest of six children. Her father was a popular publican, owner of Fairley's Bar and several off-licences, in Northern Ireland during the Troubles, when Fairley remembers both Catholics and Protestants frequenting the pub.

== Career ==
Fairley appeared in a number of British television shows, including The Bill, Holby City and Casualty. Some of her earlier roles were as Cathy Michaels on ITV1's Inspector Morse in the episode titled "The Way Through the Woods", and as Nancy Phelan in Lovejoy in the episode 9 of Season 3 titled "Smoke Your Nose".

She took over the role of Mrs. Granger from Heather Bleasdale (who had played Mrs. Granger in Chamber of Secrets) in the Harry Potter and the Deathly Hallows films. From 2011 to 2013, Fairley starred as Catelyn Stark (née Tully) in the first three seasons of the HBO fantasy series Game of Thrones, replacing Jennifer Ehle who played the character in the original, unaired, pilot episode.

Fairley joined the cast of the USA Network series Suits for its third season, playing the recurring role of Dr. Ava Hessington, a chemical engineer and oil CEO accused of bribery, and after that, accused for murder. She played Margot Al-Harazi in 24: Live Another Day on Fox. Her film roles included The Invisible Woman (2013) and In the Heart of the Sea (2015). In 2014, Fairley was cast as Margaret Langston in the ABC TV Series Resurrection (2014–2015).

In 2017, it was announced Fairley would appear in a revival of Jim Cartwright's play Road at the Royal Court Theatre In 2018, she played Cassius in Julius Caesar at the Bridge Theatre, alongside David Calder, David Morrissey and Ben Whishaw. In 2019, Fairley led the Virgin Media and Amazon Prime science fiction series The Feed as Meredith Hatfield. As of June 2020, Fairley stars as Marian Wallace in the Sky Atlantic crime drama Gangs of London. She starred as Millie in the 2021 film Nobody Has to Know, alongside Bouli Lanners. In 2023, Fairley starred as Princess Augusta in Queen Charlotte: A Bridgerton Story on Netflix. She also contributed to The Gone, a TVNZ and RTÉ co-production.

== Personal life ==
Fairley has been based in London since 1986, and keeps a low public profile. She had a boyfriend from 2005 to 2012, and no known partners since. Fairley has said that she "missed the gene" for motherhood, having not the desire to have children some of her siblings did.

While Fairley has worked on various American projects in the past, she has no love for Hollywood; the West End theatres remain her home. She said that while television and movies provide a new challenge by making her "use a different muscle", theatre is where she feels her best work is done, where she started her career, and where she hopes to "end up".

== Filmography ==
=== Film ===
Year	Title	Role	Notes
1987	Hidden City	Cleaner	
1990	Hidden Agenda	Teresa Doyle	
1998	A Soldier's Daughter Never Cries	Miss O'Shaunessy	
1998	Hideous Kinky	Patricia	
2000	The Second Death	Aisling	Short film
2001	The Others	Mrs. Marlish	
2002	Shearing	Yvonne	Short films
2009	Suicide Man	Woman on Cliff	Short films
2010	Cup Cake	Annie McNabb	
2010	Anton Checkov's The Duel	Marya	
2010	Chatroom	Rosie	
2010	Harry Potter and the Deathly Hallows – Part 1	Mrs. Granger	
2013	The Invisible Woman	Caroline Graves	
2013	Philomena	Sally Mitchell	
2013	Jack and the Cuckoo-Clock Heart	Brigitte Helm (voice)	English version
2014	Ironclad: Battle for Blood	Joan De Vesci	
2014	Montana	DCI Rachel Jones	
2014	I Am Here	Mother	Short film
2015	In the Heart of the Sea	Mrs. Nickerson	
2016	Edith	Sheila	Short films
2019	The Trap	Michelle	Short films
2020	Lesson 7	Max	Short films
2021	Nobody Has to Know	Millie MacPherson	
2022	An Irish Goodbye	Grainne (voice)	Short film
2023	The Trap	Michelle	Longer version of 2019 short
2024	Small Things Like These	Mrs. Wilson	
2026	Whistle	Ivy Raymore	
2026	No Ordinary Heist	Marjorie Fulton	

=== Television ===
Year	Title	Role	Notes
1987	Teresa	Rosie	Television film
1988	Crossfire	Scanlon's Girl	Mini-series; episode 1: "Bringing It Home"
1989	Saracen	Maeve	Episode 6: "Starcross"
1990	4 Play	Maureen	Series 1; episode 8: "Valentine Falls"
1990	Theatre Night	Ruth	Series 5; episode 4: "Pentecost"
1991	Children of the North	Kate	Episodes 1, 3 and 4
1991	Screen Two	Sharon	Series 8; episode 2: "Flea Bites"
1991	Casualty	Kathy Emerick	Series 6; episode 2: "Judgement Day"
1992	Lovejoy	Nancy Phelan	Series 3; episode 9: "Smoke Your Nose"
1992	Screenplay	Jenny	Series 7; episode 2: "Force of Duty"
1993	Screen Two	Fiona Gibbons - Liverpool	Series 9; episode 3: "The Long Roads"
1993	Comics	Nula O'Reilly	Episodes 1 & 2
1993	Casualty	Kate Maguire	Series 8; episode 4: "No Place to Hide"
1994	Cardiac Arrest	Casualty Sister Karen Teller	Series 1; episodes 2, 4 and 6
1995	Screen Two	Roisin Donaghy	Series 11; episode 2: "Life After Life"
1995	The Bill	Beth Spence	Series 11; episode 77: "No Choice"
1995	Inspector Morse	Cathy Michaels	Series 8; episode 1: "The Way Through the Woods"
1996	Screen Two	Jean McBride	Series 13; episode 5: "The Precious Blood"
1996	Safe and Sound	Eleanor Delaney	Main role. Episodes 1–6
1996	A Mug's Game	Kathy Cowan	Episodes 1–4
1997	The Broker's Man	Gabby Rodwell	Main role. Series 1; episodes 1–6
1997	The History of Tom Jones: a Foundling	Mrs. Harriet Fitzpatrick	Mini-series; episodes 2–5
1999	Vicious Circle	Frances	Television film
1999	Births, Marriages and Deaths	Pat	Main role. Episodes 1–4
2000	McCready and Daughter	Bernadette	Television film
2001	In Deep	Phoebe / Eva	Series 1; episodes 1 and 2: "Blue on Blue: Parts 1 and 2"
2001	Rebus	Janice Mee	Series 1; episodes 3 and 4: "Dead Souls" and "Mortal Causes"
2003	Holby City	Heidi Drury	Series 6; episode 6: "Keep It in the Family"
2003	The Clinic	Shirley	Series 1; episode 6
2005	Ahead of the Class	Sonia Venning	Television film
2005	The Golden Hour	Julia Harper	Mini-series; episode 4
2006	The Catherine Tate Show	Nurse Rosemary	Series 3; episode 1: "Mum, I'm Gay"
2006	Strictly Confidential	Carol Machin	Episode 2
2007	Trial & Retribution	Janet Jenkins	Series 10; episodes 9 and 10: "Mirror Image: Parts 1 and 2"
2007	The Street	Paul's Mum	Series 2; episode 6: "The Promise"
2009	A Short Stay in Switzerland	Mrs. Savery	Television film
2009	Lark Rise to Candleford	Mrs. Lizbeth Patterson	Series 2; episode 10
2009	Best: His Mother's Son	Ann Best	Television film
2009	Taggart	Joan Revie	Series 25; episode 4: "So Long Baby"
2009	Misfits	Louise Young	Series 1; episodes 1 and 2
2010	Midsomer Murders	Iris Holman	Series 13; episode 6: "The Noble Art"
2011	Silent Witness	DI Suzy Harte	Series 14; episodes 5 and 6: "First Casualty: Parts 1 and 2"
2011–2013	Game of Thrones	Catelyn Stark	Main role. Seasons 1–3; 25 episodes
2012	Coming Up	Jen	Series 10; episode 7: "Colour"
2013	Suits	Ava Hessington	Recurring role. Season 3; 8 episodes
2014	24: Live Another Day	Margot Al-Harazi	Mini-series; episodes 2–9
2014	Common	Shelagh Wallace	Television film
2014–2015	Resurrection	Margaret Langston	Season 2; episodes 1–13
2015	The Lizzie Borden Chronicles	Aideen Trotwood	Mini-series; episode 8: "Capsize"
2015	Crossing Lines	Sophie Baines	Season 3; episodes 1 and 2: "Redux" and "Whistleblower"
2016	Rebellion	Dolly Butler	Mini-series; episodes 1–5
2017	Fortitude	Freya Lennox	Series 2; episodes 1–10
2017	The White Princess	Margaret Beaufort	Main role. Mini-series; episodes 1–8
2017	Penn Zero: Part-Time Hero	Queen Igneous (voice)	Season 2; episode 5; segment: "Rockullan, Papyron, Scissorian"
2018	To Provide All People	Intensive Care Nurse	Television film
2019	The Feed	Meredith Hatfield	Main role. Episodes 1–10
2019	Responsible Child	Kerry	Television film
2020–present	Gangs of London	Marian Wallace	Main role. Series 1–3; 25 episodes
2023	Queen Charlotte: A Bridgerton Story	Princess Augusta	Main role. Mini-series; episodes 1–6
2023–2024	The Gone	Judge Hannah Martin	Main role. Series 1 and 2; 11 episodes
2026	How to Get to Heaven from Belfast	Margo	Recurring role. Season 1; 7 episodes

=== Theatre ===
Year	Title	Role	Notes
1993	Oleanna	Carol	Royal Court Theatre
1998	Never Land	Elisabeth	Royal Court Theatre
1999	The Weir	Valerie	Walter Kerr Theatre
2003	Scenes from the Big Picture	Helen Woods	National Theatre
2003	Loyal Women	Brenda	Royal Court Theatre
2004	Ashes to Ashes	Rebecca	Lyric Theatre
2006	The Wild Duck	Gina	Donmar Warehouse
2006	Gates of Gold	Alma	Trafalgar Studios
2007	Othello	Emilia	Donmar Warehouse
2007	Macbeth	Lady Macbeth	West Yorkshire Playhouse
2009	Dancing at Lughnasa	Kate	Old Vic
2010	Greta Garbo Came to Donegal	Paulie Hennessy	Tricycle Theatre
2011	Remembrance Day	Sveta	Royal Court Theatre
2015	Splendour	Genevieve	Donmar Warehouse
2017	Road	Helen / Marion / Brenda	Royal Court Theatre
2018	Julius Caesar	Cassius	Bridge Theatre

== Awards and nominations ==
Year	Award	Category	Work	Result	Ref.
2008	Olivier Awards	Best Performance in a Supporting Role	Othello	Nominated	
2011	Irish Film & Television Award	Best Actress - Television	Game of Thrones	Nominated	
2011	Scream Award	Best Ensemble	Game of Thrones	Nominated	
2011	Screen Actors Guild Award	Outstanding Performance by an Ensemble in a Drama Series	Game of Thrones	Nominated	
2013	Irish Film & Television Award	Best Actress - Television	Game of Thrones	Won	
2013	Saturn Award	Best Supporting Actress on Television	Game of Thrones	Nominated	
2013	Screen Actors Guild Award	Outstanding Performance by an Ensemble in a Drama Series	Game of Thrones	Nominated	
2015	Irish Film & Television Award	Best Supporting Actress - Television	Rebellion	Nominated	
2019	Clarence Derwent Award	Best Female in a Supporting Role	Julius Caesar	Won	
2019	WhatsOnStage Award	Best Supporting Actress in a Play	Julius Caesar	Nominated	
2021	Chicago International Film Festival	Best Actress	Nobody Has to Know	Won	
