= Belgium–Pakistan relations =

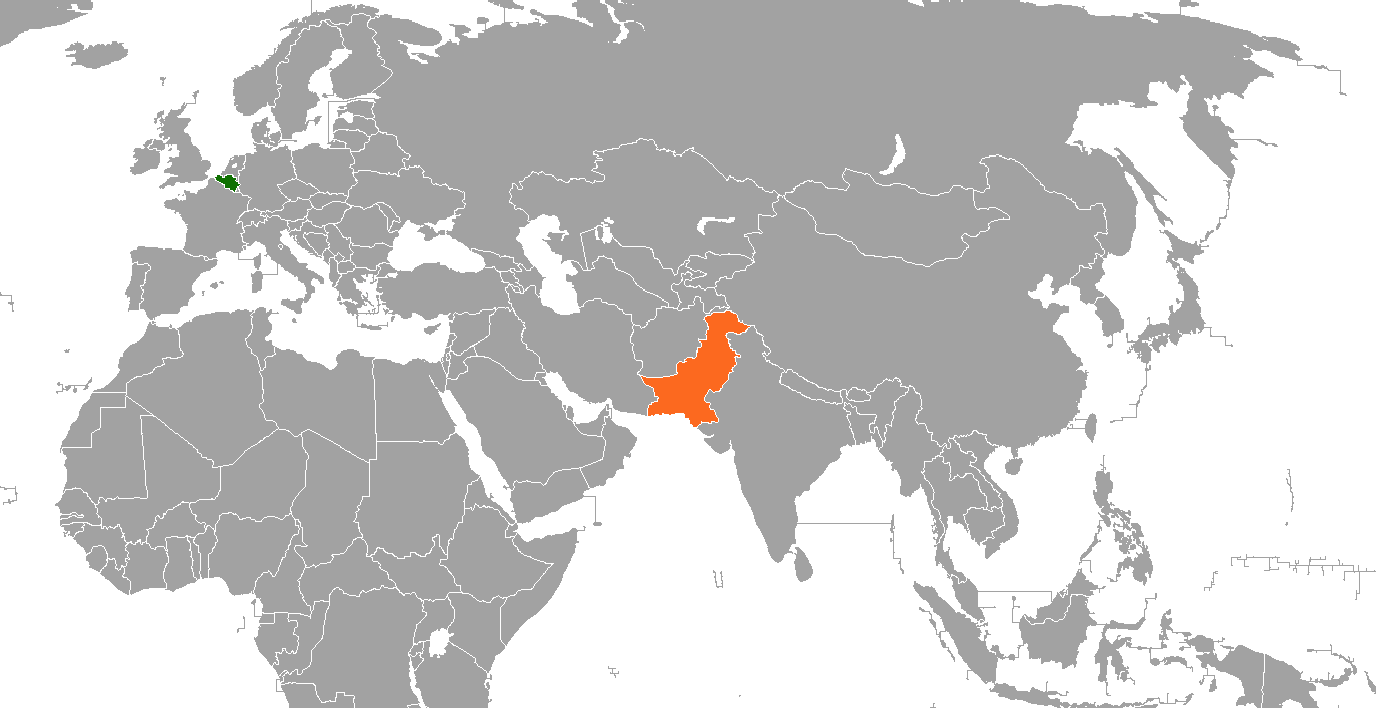
- Belgium: Pakistan

Belgium–Pakistan relations are the bilateral relations between Belgium and Pakistan. Belgium has an embassy in Islamabad and Pakistan has an embassy in Brussels.

== Economic relations ==
Belgium is the sixth-largest European importer of Pakistani goods, and the bilateral trade between the two is approaching US$600 million. During the 2010 Pakistan floods Belgium provided aid worth €4.6 million to Pakistan.

== Pakistanis in Belgium ==
Belgium is also home to a large number of Pakistanis 19,247 (2012 official estimate). In 2007, 666 Pakistani citizens were granted Belgian citizenship, making them the highest Asian recipients of Belgian citizenship in 2007.

== Trade agreement ==
Pakistan diplomatic post in Belgium is important, because Brussels is the headquarters of the European Union and NATO, among many other international organisations with which Pakistan maintain close contact. Pakistan has often lobbied to gain Belgium support in establishing Pakistan-EU Free Trade agreement, as Belgium is the centre of European politics and policy making

== High level visits ==
Pakistani former president, Pervez Musharraf, has also previously extended a visit to Belgium during his tour of Europe in early 2008, which also included visits to the United Kingdom, France and Sweden. During his stay in Brussels, he met the then-Prime Minister of Belgium, Guy Verhofstadt, and the two leaders held significant talks on trade and defence co-operation.

== See also ==
- A Wedding - A 2016 film co-production of Belgium, Pakistan, France, and Luxembourg about forced marriages and honour killings
- Foreign relations of Belgium
- Foreign relations of Pakistan
