= Violette (2013 film) =

2013 film

- Film poster
- Directed by: Martin Provost
- Written by: Martin Provost
- Produced by: Gilles Sacuto; Miléna Poylo
- Starring: Emmanuelle Devos
- Cinematography: Yves Cape
- Edited by: Ludo Troch
- Music by: Hugues Tabar-Nouval
- Distributed by: Diaphana Films (France)
- Release dates: 6 September 2013 (TIFF); 6 November 2013 (France)
- Running time: 139 minutes
- Countries: France; Belgium
- Language: French
- Budget: $6 million
- Box office: $1.6 million

Violette is a 2013 French-Belgian biographical drama film written and directed by Martin Provost, about the French novelist Violette Leduc. It was screened in the Special Presentation section at the 2013 Toronto International Film Festival.

== Plot ==
During the last years of World War II, Violette Leduc lives with Maurice Sachs, who doesn't love her but who does encourage her to write. She seeks out Simone de Beauvoir and eventually presents her with a draft of her first book. De Beauvoir rewards Violette's trust by reading and commenting on the book and by introducing her to contemporary intellectual icons Jean-Paul Sartre, Jean Genet and Albert Camus. In 1964, the success of Violette Leduc's autobiographical bestseller La Bâtarde enables her to earn a living from her writing.

== Cast ==
- Emmanuelle Devos as Violette Leduc
- Sandrine Kiberlain as Simone de Beauvoir
- Jacques Bonnaffé as Jean Genet
- Olivier Gourmet as Jacques Guérin
- Catherine Hiegel as Berthe Leduc
- Stanley Weber as Le jeune maçon

== Reception ==
Violette received generally positive reviews from critics. Review aggregation website Rotten Tomatoes reported an approval rating of 86%, based on 50 reviews, with an average score of 7.2/10. The site's consensus reads, "Led by an outstanding performance from Emmanuelle Devos, Violette is a rewarding, bracingly honest look at social mores and the literary life." At Metacritic, which assigns a normalized rating out of 100 to reviews from mainstream critics, the film received an average score of 72, based on 14 reviews, indicating "generally favorable reviews". Peter Bradshaw of The Guardian gave Violette 4 out of 5 and said that "Emmanuelle Devos brings enormous charisma to this story of writerly ambition and romantic disappointment".

== Accolades ==
Award	Category	Recipients and nominees	Result
Magritte Awards	Best Foreign Film in Coproduction		Nominated
