= The Last Flight (2009 film) =

- French theatrical release poster
- Directed by: Karim Dridi
- Written by: Karim Dridi; Pascal Arnold; Sylvain Estibal (novel)
- Produced by: Jean Cottin
- Starring: Marion Cotillard; Guillaume Canet
- Cinematography: Antoine Monod
- Edited by: Lise Beaulieu
- Music by: Le Trio Joubran
- Production company: Gaumont
- Distributed by: Gaumont
- Release date: 16 December 2009 (France)
- Running time: 86 minutes
- Country: France
- Language: French

The Last Flight (Le dernier vol) is a 2009 French film. Directed by Karim Dridi, it stars Marion Cotillard and Guillaume Canet. The film is based on the French novel Le dernier vol de Lancaster by Sylvain Estibal which is loosely based on the real life events surrounding the disappearance of British aviator Bill Lancaster.

== Synopsis ==
Aviator Marie Vallières de Beaumont (Cotillard) goes on a journey to find her lover Bill Lancaster after his plane disappears in the Sahara. After her plane is forced down in the Ténéré she meets Lieutenant Antoine Chauvet (Canet) of the French Camel Corps who joins in the hunt for Lancaster. As the two endure hardships in the desert, they begin to develop feelings for each other.

== Cast ==
- Marion Cotillard as Marie Vallières de Beaumont
- Guillaume Canet as Antoine Chauvet
- Frédéric Epaud as Louis
- Michaël Vander-Meiren as Vasseur
- Guillaume Marquet as Capatain Vincent Brosseau
- Saïdou Abatcha as Saïddou

== Production ==
Karim Dridi decided to develop the film after reading French journalist Sylvain Estibal's novel Le dernier vol de Lancaster. Dridi had travelled through the Sahara and was interested in making The Last Flight because he felt the novel could be made into a film that deviated from the normal conventions of the romantic epic. After he narrated the story to Marion Cotillard, she agreed to play Marie, a character loosely based on Lancaster's real-life lover, Chubbie Miller.

The Last Flight was originally scheduled to begin shooting in Niger, but due to safety concerns it was filmed in and around the Moroccan village of Merzouga. Due to the location change, Tuareg actors had to be brought in from Mali. For his role in the film as a French lieutenant who has assimilated to Tuareg culture, Guillaume Canet learned Tamasheq, the Tuareg language.

== Reception ==
=== Critical response ===
The film received mixed reviews. While critics praised Antoine Monod's cinematography, they criticised the story for a perceived lack of originality, comparing it to The English Patient and The Sheltering Sky. Jordan Mintzer from Variety praised the film's visuals and the soundtrack by Le Trio Joubran, but mentioned a lack of overall credibility and 'puttering along in the drama department'.

=== Box office ===
The Last Flight opened in France in the fifth position behind Avatar, Arthur and the Invisibles, Nicolas Vanier's Loup, and Frédéric Berthe's RTT. By 27 December it had earned only $2.8 million.
