= Matyas Veress =

Belgian film editor

Matyas Veress is a film editor with more than thirty film credits. His career started in 1993 as the assistant editor on the film Just Friends. He received the Magritte Award for Best Editing for his work in the 2009 film Mr. Nobody.
