= Playing Dead (film) =

- Film poster
- French: Je fais le mort
- Directed by: Jean-Paul Salomé
- Written by: Jean-Paul Salomé
- Produced by: Michel Saint-Jean; Jean-Pierre Dardenne; Luc Dardenne
- Starring: François Damiens; Géraldine Nakache; Lucien Jean-Baptiste; Jean-Paul Salomé
- Cinematography: Pascal Ridao
- Edited by: Sylvie Lager
- Music by: Bruno Coulais
- Production company: Diaphana Films
- Distributed by: Diaphana Films
- Release dates: 26 August 2013 (Angoulême); 11 December 2013 (France)
- Running time: 104 minutes
- Country: France
- Language: French
- Budget: $7.2 million
- Box office: $772.000

Playing Dead (French: Je fais le mort) is a 2013 French comedy film written and directed by Jean-Paul Salomé. The film stars François Damiens, Géraldine Nakache and Lucien Jean-Baptiste. It was screened at the Rome Film Festival.

== Cast ==
- François Damiens as Jean Renault
- Géraldine Nakache as Noémie Desfontaines
- Lucien Jean-Baptiste as Lieutenant Lamy
- Anne Le Ny as Madame Jacky
- Jean-Marie Winling as Michel Beauchatel
- Kévin Azaïs as Ludo
- Nanou Garcia as Zelda
- Corentin Lobet as Servaz
- Judith Henry as Caroline
- Jean-Paul Salomé as TV journalist

== Accolades ==
The film received three nominations at the 5th Magritte Awards.
