= Flemish Heaven =

2016 film

- Theatrical release poster
- Directed by: Peter Monsaert
- Written by: Peter Monsaert
- Starring: Sara Vertongen
- Edited by: Alain Dessauvage
- Release date: 11 September 2016 (TIFF)
- Running time: 114 minutes
- Country: Belgium
- Languages: Dutch; French

Flemish Heaven (French: Le Ciel Flamand) is a 2016 Belgian drama film directed by Peter Monsaert. It was screened in the Discovery section at the 2016 Toronto International Film Festival.

== Plot ==
Monique runs a brothel together with her daughter Sylvie and some other girls. Eline is the six-year-old daughter of Sylvie. The brothel is a forbidden area for her. However, on her birthday she sneaks into the brothel and meets a travestite of whom only the voice is heard and some small parts of his clothes. He kidnaps Eline and sexually assaults her. She is found by Dirk, a bus driver. He is the father of Eline but this must remain a secret. That's why he is introduced as an uncle of Eline since she was born. The police starts an investigation but all tracks are a dead end. Both Sylvie and Dirk try to find the man who is responsible. Dirk and Eline meet a drunk Sinterklaas on 5 December. The man's behavior towards the children and the way Eline acts when she sees him, makes Dirk believe he is the wrongdoer. Eline tells Dirk the wrongdoer is named Robert. When Sinterklaas insinuates his name is Robert, Dirk kills him. He burns the car of the man and buries him under concrete on his farm. The police closes the investigation of Eline's case. Around Christmas a message is on national television regarding the disappeared man who is called Philippe. Eline associates this man with Sinterklaas and is happy he will not return. It is not revealed if Philippe is indeed the peadophile. Dirk gets remorse and wants to hang himself just before the ending credits but his fate is unknown.

== Cast ==
- Sara Vertongen as Sylvie
- Wim Willaert as Dirk
- Esra Vandenbussche as Eline
- Ingrid De Vos as Monique
- Isabelle van Hecke as Vanessa
