= A Wedding (2016 film) =

2016 film

- Film poster
- Directed by: Stephan Streker
- Written by: Stephan Streker
- Starring: Lina El Arabi
- Release date: 24 August 2016
- Running time: 95 minutes
- Countries: Belgium; France; Pakistan; Luxembourg
- Languages: French; Urdu

A Wedding (French: Noces) is a 2016 internationally co-produced drama film directed by Stephan Streker. It was screened in the Discovery section at the 2016 Toronto International Film Festival. It received eight nominations at the 8th Magritte Awards, including Best Film and Best Director for Streker, and won two. It is based on the honour killing of Sadia Sheikh. Streker described the film as a Greek tragedy.

== Story ==
A Belgian-Pakistani woman named Zahira Kazim, now 18 years old, breaks up with her boyfriend (who is also of Pakistani ancestry) when he says he does not want a child after she becomes pregnant. Her parents, meanwhile, ask her to choose between three candidates for marriage, all based in Pakistan, and she is uninterested in all of them. Instead she falls in love with a Belgian man of European ancestry, Pierre, and decides to get an abortion in the Netherlands after initially being unable to go through with one. Her friend Aurore and Aurore's father André help her as the relationship between herself and her family deteriorates over their attempts to make her agree to a forced marriage: she moves in with Aurore after her father starts a fight at her school.

Zahira comes back to her family after her Barcelona-based sister, Hina Kazim, pleads with her to come back, and she goes through with a wedding to a French-speaking Pakistani man over Skype. However she leaves again when told she will fly to Pakistan for a second wedding and that Hina will go to Pakistan instead of returning to Spain; Zahira spends time with Pierre. Her father, Mansoor Kazim, experiences medical problems due to the stress. Zahira comes back to her house one last time to say goodbye, but her brother Amir Kazim fatally shoots her, an act of sororicide and an honour killing, whilst hugging her.

As photographs of crime scene exhibits are on the screen, a voiceover of a farewell letter addressed to her family occurs.

== Cast ==
- Lina El Arabi as Zahira Kazim
  - Streker described her as an "Antigone of her time" and "a character enriched by two cultures that, rather than cancelling one another out, add to one another." She is a Muslim and remains so even after eloping with Pierre.
- Sebastien Houbani as Amir Kazim
- Babak Karimi as Mansoor Kazim
  - Jay Weissberg of Variety stated that Streker "also scrupulously tries to present Mansoor as a loving father tied to a rigid code of honor which will destroy his entire family if shirked" but that he "succeeds only fitfully." Karimi never speaks in any of his native languages in this film and is the only actor with this situation.
- Neena Kulkarni as Yelda Kazim
  - Kulkarni stated that Yelda is "not a villain at all" but instead as someone "caught in circumstances" and "stuck to her fanaticism or beliefs." Kulkarni added that "despite staying in [Belgium], [Yelda] doesn't integrate into that country at all."
- Olivier Gourmet as André
- Alice de Lencquesaing as Aurore
- Zacharie Chasseriaud as Pierre
- Aurora Marion as Hina Kazim
  - The Sheikh case did not involve an older sister; the writer created an older sister character for the fictional story.
- Harmandeep Palminder as Adnan
- Sandor Funtek as Frank

The actor playing the imam character was in real life an imam and was of Pakistani heritage.

== Development ==
It is a co-production of the following: the Belgian firms Daylight and Minds Meet, the French firm Formosa Productions, the Luxembourgish firm Tarantula Films, and the Pakistani firm Bodhicitta Works.

Streker stated that he did not feel inspired by the Sheikh murder until his discovery that the killer, her brother, loved his sister. As it was based on a real case, a lawyer reviewed the script to ensure that it was compliant with Belgian law. Streker added that he did not want to have obvious villains, quoting Jean Renoir, who stated, in Streker's words "there were never any bad guys in his films because each of them always had his reasons."

Streker used a consultant to ensure depictions of Pakistani culture were accurate. The final actress he cast was El Arabi even though he initially believed the role would be the first one filled. Desiring an "Elizabeth Taylor" for the Zahira role, he specified this aspect in capital letters, and added that she was "une des plus grandes actrices qui ait jamais existé" ("one of the greatest actresses who ever existed"). He also wanted someone who was Francophone, about 18 years old, and a person who would be credible as a Belgian Pakistani. Streker stated that he had such specific requirements that he could not find an actress of actual Pakistani heritage; instead he chose an actress of Moroccan heritage. He initially did not especially notice El Arabi but some videotapes of her already done convinced him she could fill the role, and he ordered a second audition for her. He stated that in every scene, Zahira's point of view was in the opening and ending. As part of the filming she had to learn some Urdu.

Streker is personally friends with Gourmet and already knew him. He learned about Houbani through one of his acquaintances. In regards to Karimi, Streker decided to use him after he found out that Karimi, who he was familiar with from watching the film A Separation, spoke French.

== Release ==
The film premiered on 24 August 2016, in the Festival du Film francophone d'Angoulême and was also scheduled to show in the Toronto International Film Festival.

== Reviews ==
Weissberg stated that despite the fact the director "strives hard to offer a balanced view of a traditional family in Belgium forcing their daughter into an arranged marriage, yet in the end he delivers an issue-of-the-week cautionary tale that, though well-made, hits far too many expected buttons." However he stated that the performance of the lead actress compensated for this issue.

The Hollywood Reporter concluded it is "A probing family drama carried by a strong multicultural cast."

== Accolades ==
Award / Film Festival	Category	Recipients and nominees	Result
Istanbul International Film Festival	FACE Award		Nominated
Lumière Awards	Best French-Language Film		Nominated
Magritte Awards	Best Film		Nominated
Magritte Awards	Best Director	Stephan Streker	Nominated
Magritte Awards	Best Supporting Actress	Aurora Marion	Won
Magritte Awards	Best Screenplay	Stephan Streker	Nominated
Magritte Awards	Best Production Design	Catherine Cosme	Nominated
Magritte Awards	Best Costume Design	Sophie Van Den Keybus	Won
Magritte Awards	Best Sound	Olivier Ronval and Michel Schillings	Nominated
Magritte Awards	Best Editing	Jérôme Guiot	Nominated
Rotterdam International Film Festival	MovieZone Award		Nominated

== See also ==
- List of Belgian films of the 2010s
- List of French films of 2016
- List of Luxembourgish films
- List of Pakistani films of 2016
- Overseas Pakistani
- Honour killing in Pakistan
- Abortion in Belgium
- Abortion in the Netherlands
