= The Marchers =

- Directed by: Nabil Ben Yadir
- Written by: Nabil Ben Yadir; Nadia Lakhdar; Ahmed Ahmidi
- Produced by: Diana Elbaum; Benoit Roland; Hugo Sélignac
- Starring: Jamel Debbouze; Olivier Gourmet; Lubna Azabal; Hafsia Herzi
- Cinematography: Danny Elsen
- Edited by: Damien Keyeux
- Music by: Stephen Warbeck
- Production companies: Chi-Fou-Mi Productions; France 3 Europa Corp; Entre Chien et Loup; Belgacom TV
- Distributed by: EuropaCorp. Distribution (France)
- Release dates: 8 November 2013 (Arras Film Festival); 27 November 2013 (France and Belgium)
- Running time: 120 minutes
- Countries: France; Belgium
- Languages: French; Arabic
- Budget: $11 million
- Box office: $1.3 million

The Marchers (French: La Marche) is a 2013 French comedy-drama film by Nabil Ben Yadir. It is loosely based on the events surrounding the 1983 March for Equality and Against Racism.

The film's release in November 2013 coincided with the 30th anniversary of the march.

== Plot ==
In 1983 France, teenaged Mohamed is shot by a policeman, but survives. Rejecting his friends' proposal of violent retribution, he proposes political action inspired by Martin Luther King Jr. and Mahatma Gandhi. With two friends, and support from Dubois, the priest of Minguettes, they embark on a non-violent March for Equality and Against Racism from Marseille to Paris.

== Cast ==
- Tewfik Jallab as Mohamed
- Vincent Rottiers as Sylvain
- M'Barek Belkouk as Farid
- Nader Boussandel as Yazid
- Lubna Azabal as Kheira
- Hafsia Herzi as Monia
- Olivier Gourmet as Dubois
- Charlotte Le Bon as Claire
- Philippe Nahon as René Ledu
- Jamel Debbouze as Hassan
- Malik Zidi as Philippe, the RG
- Simon Abkarian as Farid's father
- Corinne Masiero as Dominique
- Rufus as François, pastor
- Benjamin Lavernhe as Thomas
- Kévin Azaïs as Rémi
- Françoise Miquelis as Georgina Dufoix
- Finnegan Oldfield as Radio Host

== Comparison to historical events ==
Answering a question about taking "liberties with the narration when telling a true story", director and co-writer Ben Yadir said: "You focus on the great History: the towns, the march of the torches, the return to Lyon, the death of Habib Grimzi, all these images that pull you back to reality... But at the start in Marseille, there was a group of 32, and we obviously could not make a movie with 32 characters. We thus created 10 characters around which we built short stories."

== Release ==
The Marchers had theatrical showings in North America as part of the Rendez-vous with French Cinema series 2014 program.

== Reception ==
Boyd van Hoeij of The Hollywood Reporter said "[t]he film’s message of equality is loud and sincere but Yadir, here directing his second feature, struggles to maintain a workable entente between the downbeat story [...] with misplaced-feeling broad humor."

Peter Debruge of Variety called it "uplifting story of racial tolerance [which] should travel well."

Le Parisien gave it a positive review.

== Accolades ==
Award	Category	Recipient(s)	Result
Lumière Awards	Best Screenplay	Nabil Ben Yadir	Nominated
Lumière Awards	Best Male Revelation	Tewfik Jallab	Nominated
Magritte Awards	Best Film	The Marchers	Nominated
Magritte Awards	Best Director	Nabil Ben Yadir	Nominated
Magritte Awards	Best Screenplay	Nabil Ben Yadir	Nominated
Magritte Awards	Best Supporting Actor	Olivier Gourmet	Nominated
Magritte Awards	Best Supporting Actress	Lubna Azabal	Won
Magritte Awards	Best Editing	Damien Keyeux	Won
