= Sylvain Estibal =

French reporter, author and film director

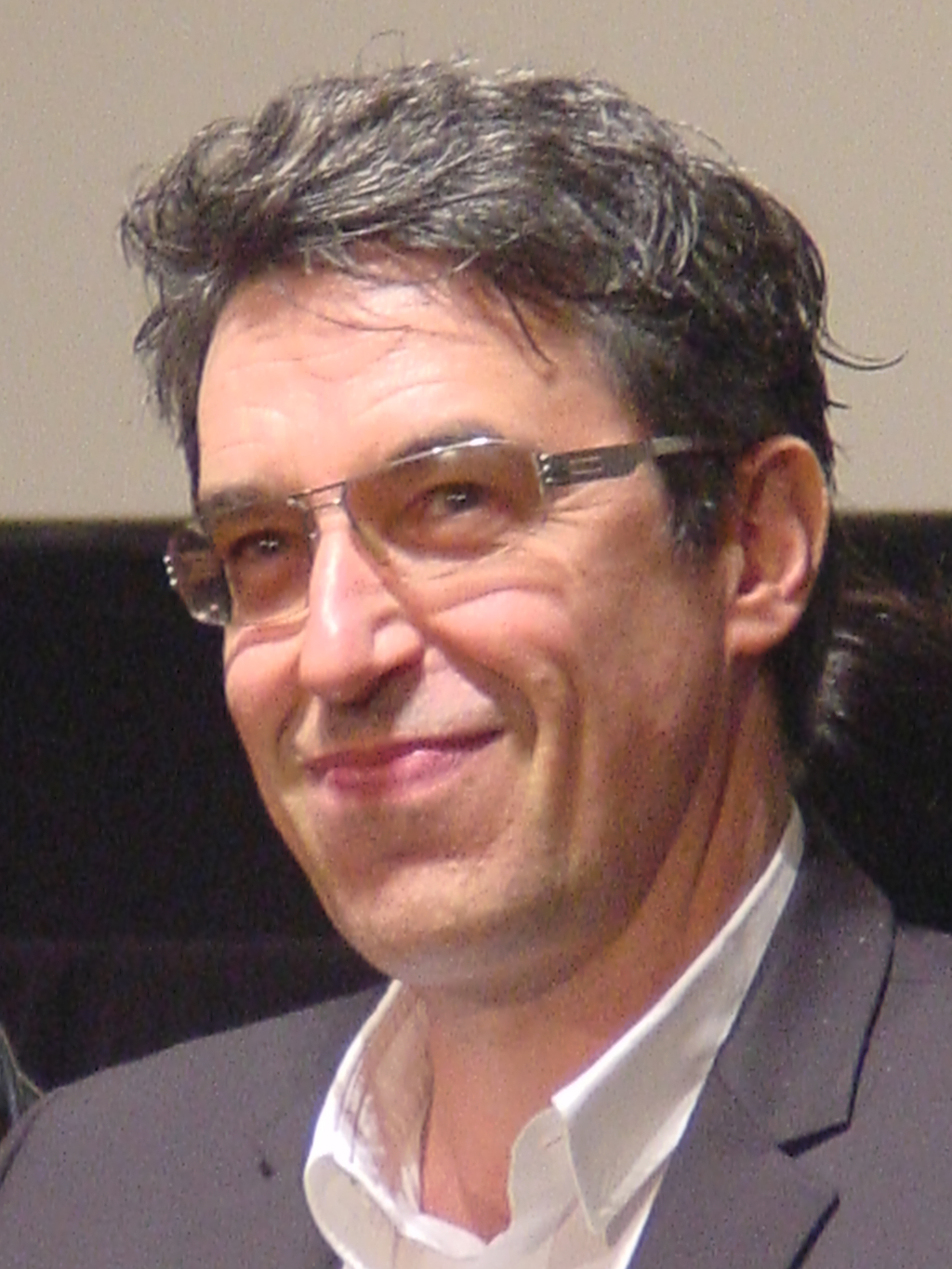
2011

Sylvain Estibal (born 13 March 1967) is a French reporter, author and film director. The film The Last Flight was based on Estibal's 2006 book. He directed the film When Pigs Have Wings for which he was awarded the César Award for Best Debut.
