= Animals (2021 film) =

2021 film

- Film poster
- Directed by: Nabil Ben Yadir
- Written by: Nabil Ben Yadir; Antoine Cuypers
- Produced by: Nabil Ben Yadir; Benoit Roland
- Starring: Soufiane Chilah
- Cinematography: Frank van den Eeden
- Music by: François Aubinet
- Production companies: 10:80 Films; A Team Productions; Les Films du Fleuve; Maje Productions
- Distributed by: Cinéart (Belgium); Wild Bunch (France)
- Release dates: 13 October 2021 (Ghent); 9 March 2022
- Running time: 91 minutes
- Countries: Belgium; France
- Language: French

Animals is a 2021 psychological thriller film directed by Nabil Ben Yadir. It stars Soufiane Chilah and was written by Antoine Cuypers and Ben Yadir, who also produced alongside Benoit Roland. The film is based on the 2012 murder of gay man Ihsane Jarfi in Liège. The murder was denounced as a hate crime and became the first case of homophobic violence recognized by law in Belgium.

It was screened at the Film Fest Ghent on 13 October 2021, where it competed for the Grand Prix. At the 12th Magritte Awards, Animals received six nominations, including Best Film and Best Director for Ben Yadir.

== Cast ==
- Soufiane Chilah as Brahim
- Gianni Guettaf as Loïc
- Vincent Overath as Geoffroy
- Lionel Maisin as Christophe
- Serkan Sancak as Milos

== Critical reception ==
Animals received polarized reviews from film critics, with praise towards Soufiane Chilah's performance and Frank van den Eeden's cinematography, but criticism towards its graphic portrayal of violence and crime.

== Accolades ==
| Award / Film Festival | Category | Recipients and nominees | Result |
|---|---|---|---|
| Camerimage | Best Cinematography | Frank van den Eeden | Nominated |
| Camerimage | FIPRESCI Prize | | Won |
| Film Fest Ghent | Grand Prix | | Nominated |
| Film Fest Ghent | Explore Award | | Runner-up |
| Magritte Awards | Best Film | | Nominated |
| Magritte Awards | Best Director | Nabil Ben Yadir | Nominated |
| Magritte Awards | Best Actor | Soufiane Chilah | Nominated |
| Magritte Awards | Most Promising Actor | Gianni Guettaf | Nominated |
| Magritte Awards | Best Screenplay | Nabil Ben Yadir and Antoine Cuypers | Nominated |
| Magritte Awards | Best Sound | François Aubinet | Won |
| Tallinn Black Nights Film Festival | Grand Prix | | Nominated |
