= Angel (2016 film) =

2017 film by Harry Cleven

Angel (original title: Mon ange) is a French-language Belgian romance fantasy film, directed by Harry Cleven, and written by Cleven and Thomas Gunzig. The film premiered in 2016.

== Plot ==
Louise is a happy woman, taking part in a magic show along with her magician lover. However one day, he disappears without a trace and the heartbroken Louise is sent to a mental asylum. She finds out she is pregnant, and nine months later, gives birth to a baby boy, whom she names Angel. Angel has the special gift of invisibility and Louise hides his identity from the rest of the world. Angel has a normal childhood until he meets a blind girl Madeleine. They become good friends. However, one day Madeleine reveals that she will recover her sight.

Louise dies unexpectedly and Angel escapes while the nurses are taking away his mother's body, taking refuge in his mother's childhood home. Years pass and Angel is now a grown man, still invisible. Madeleine has successfully recovered her sight. She has been searching for Angel for a long time and had just bought his mother's house. She goes to the asylum to find out more about him, but there is no record of his existence. She leaves a letter on Louise's grave. Angel picks up the letter, where Madeleine asks him to come back to her. Angel continues to live in the house, without her knowledge. Madeleine continues to feel something is off but dismisses it. After too much of waiting, he writes her a letter that they should meet, only if Madeleine keeps her eyes closed. They meet in the forest, and Madeleine as promised, keeps her eyes closed, but she is able to feel his presence.

Angel asks Madeleine about how it felt when she regained her sight back, to which she details that to her, objects came into existence only when she touched them. Later she realised that the objects were always there. This makes Angel question his existence. They continue meeting, with Madeleine blindfolded. One day they go to the lake, and Angel promises Madeleine that he will reveal himself to her that night.

Night arrives and Angel is waiting in the bedroom with a bedsheet on his head. Madeleine says that she will love him no matter how he looks, however upon removing the bedsheet, Madeleine is shocked to see nothing. Angel tells her the truth, which is too much for her to take. She falls to the floor crying. She confesses that she will keep her eyes closed if it means they can be together. Angel believes that she will have to be blind to actually love him. Madeleine wakes up in the morning, only to find a letter from Angel saying that he is going away from her life, promising to always love her but that she stops loving him. Madeleine packs up her stuff and is ready to leave when she feels something in her chest, almost as if she knows where Angel is. She catches his scent and finds out that he is at the lake. She rushes out calling for him. Angel doesn't respond but accidentally falls into the water. Angel is not a swimmer and Madeleine dives in and saves him from drowning. Madeleine declares that this is the end of their misery and they will stay together forever. She promises to learn to see him with her eyes open.

In the end, they are a happy couple and have a baby together. They also have their own magic show.

== Cast ==
- Elina Löwensohn as Louise
- François Vincentelli as Angel
- Fleur Geffrier as Madeleine (Adult)
- Maya Dory as Madeleine (Teenager)
- Hannah Boudreau as Madeleine (Child)

== Awards ==
Angel received three nominations at the 8th Magritte Awards. It won Most Promising Actress for Dory, and was further nominated for Best Cinematography and Best Production Design.
