= When Pigs Have Wings =

- Film poster
- French: Le cochon de Gaza
- Directed by: Sylvain Estibal
- Written by: Sylvain Estibal
- Produced by: Jean-Philippe Blime; Franck Chorot; Benito Mueller; Wolfgang Müller; Jean-Jacques Neira; Hubert Toint; Jeremy Burdek; Maya Hariri; Joffrey Hutin; Nadia Khamlichi; Adrian Politowski; Gilles Waterkeyn; Marc Olla
- Starring: Sasson Gabai
- Cinematography: Romain Winding
- Edited by: Damien Keyeux
- Music by: Aqualactica; Boogie Balagan
- Production company: Umedia
- Distributed by: StudioCanal
- Release date: 21 September 2011
- Running time: 98 minutes
- Countries: France; Belgium; Germany
- Languages: English; Arabic; Hebrew
- Budget: $4 million
- Box office: $4.2 million

When Pigs Have Wings (French: Le Cochon de Gaza; lit. 'The pig from Gaza') is a 2011 French-German-Belgian comedy film directed by Sylvain Estibal.

== Plot ==
One day Jaafar, a fortuneless Palestinian fisherman, catches a Vietnamese pig in his fishing nets. Torn between his Muslim faith and his desire to improve the lives of his wife and himself, pay debts and the reality of the conflict, Jaafar decides to undertake a most unusual trade with a young Russian-Israeli settler, Yelena. She raises pigs and - having no male pig of her own - she asks Jafaar to bring him the seed of his pig.

== Cast ==
- Sasson Gabai as Jafaar
- Baya Belal as Fatima
- Myriam Tekaïa as Yelena
- Gassan Abbas as Barber
- Khalifa Natour as Hussein
- Uri Gabay as Netsah
- Bashir Wakil as Walid
- Michael Sciortino as Rabbi
- Manuel Cauchi as Abo-Zouhair
- Ulrich Tukur as The UN Officer

== Production ==
The film was shot in Malta.

== Accolades ==
Award	Category	Recipient	Result
César Award	Best First Feature Film	Sylvain Estibal & Franck Chorot	Won
Magritte Award	Best Editing	Damien Keyeux	Nominated
Magritte Award	Best Foreign Film in Coproduction	Sylvain Estibal	Nominated
Munich Film Festival	One Future Prize	Sylvain Estibal	Won
Tokyo International Film Festival	Audience Award	Sylvain Estibal	Won
Tokyo International Film Festival	Tokyo Grand Prix	Sylvain Estibal	Nominated
