= Not My Type =

- Directed by: Lucas Belvaux
- Screenplay by: Lucas Belvaux
- Based on: Pas son genre by Philippe Vilain
- Produced by: Patrick Quinet; Patrick Sobelman
- Starring: Émilie Dequenne; Loïc Corbery
- Cinematography: Pierric Gantelmi d’Ille
- Edited by: Ludo Troch
- Music by: Frédéric Vercheval
- Production companies: AGAT Films; Artémis Productions
- Distributed by: Diaphana Film
- Release dates: 30 April 2014 (France); 7 May 2014 (Belgium)
- Running time: 111 minutes
- Countries: France; Belgium
- Language: French
- Budget: $6 million
- Box office: $3.7 million

Not My Type (French: Pas son genre) is a 2014 French-Belgian romance film directed by Lucas Belvaux and starring Émilie Dequenne and Loïc Corbery. It was based on the 2011 novel Pas son genre by Philippe Vilain. It was screened in the Contemporary World Cinema section at the 2014 Toronto International Film Festival.

== Cast ==
- Émilie Dequenne as Jennifer
- Loïc Corbery as Clément Le Guern
- Sandra Nkake as Cathy
- Charlotte Talpaert as Nolwenn
- Anne Coesens as Hélène Pasquier-Legrand
- Daniela Bisconti as Madame Bortolin
- Didier Sandre as Clément's father
- Martine Chevallier as Clément's mother
- Florian Thiriet as Johan Bortolin
- Annelise Hesme as Isabelle
- Amira Casar as Marie
- Tom Burgeat as Dylan
- Kamel Zidouri as Antoine
- Philippe Le Guay as the presenter

== Accolades ==
Award / Film Festival	Category	Recipients and nominees	Result
2014 Cabourg Film Festival	Best Film	Not My Type	Won
2014 Cabourg Film Festival	Best Actor	Loïc Corbery	Won
2014 Cabourg Film Festival	Best Actress	Émilie Dequenne	Won
40th César Awards	Best Actress	Émilie Dequenne	Nominated
40th César Awards	Best Adaptation	Lucas Belvaux	Nominated
Globes de Cristal Award	Best Actress	Émilie Dequenne	Nominated
20th Lumière Awards	Best Film	Not My Type	Nominated
20th Lumière Awards	Best Director	Lucas Belvaux	Nominated
20th Lumière Awards	Best Actress	Émilie Dequenne	Nominated
5th Magritte Awards	Best Film	Not My Type	Nominated
5th Magritte Awards	Best Director	Lucas Belvaux	Nominated
5th Magritte Awards	Best Screenplay	Lucas Belvaux	Won
5th Magritte Awards	Best Actress	Émilie Dequenne	Won
5th Magritte Awards	Best Supporting Actress	Anne Coesens	Nominated
5th Magritte Awards	Best Sound	Henri Morelle and Luc Thomas	Won
5th Magritte Awards	Best Original Score	Frédéric Vercheval	Nominated
5th Magritte Awards	Best Editing	Ludo Troch	Nominated
