= Even Lovers Get the Blues =

- Film poster
- Directed by: Laurent Micheli
- Written by: Laurent Micheli
- Produced by: Laurent Micheli; Camille Meynard
- Edited by: Julie Naas
- Release dates: 5 October 2016 (Namur); 30 August 2017 (Belgium)
- Running time: 95 minutes
- Country: Belgium
- Language: French

Even Lovers Get the Blues is a 2016 Belgian drama film written and directed by Laurent Micheli. It explores themes about gender and sexuality, and features a cast of actors in their first major film role. The film had its world premiere at the 2016 Namur International Film Festival, where it received the Critics Prize.

At the 8th Magritte Awards, it received two nominations in the categories of Best First Feature Film and Most Promising Actress for Adriana Da Fonseca.

== Accolades ==
Award / Film Festival	Category	Recipients and nominees	Result
Bangkok Film Festival	Best Film		Won
Jim Thorpe Award	Best Film		Nominated
Jim Thorpe Award	Best Director	Laurent Micheli	Won
Magritte Award	Best First Feature Film		Nominated
Magritte Award	Most Promising Actress	Adriana Da Fonseca	Nominated
Ischia Film Festival	Best Film		Nominated
Namur International Film Festival	Critics Prize	Laurent Micheli	Won
NYC Independent Film Festival	Best Narrative Feature		Won
TLVFest	Best Narrative Feature		Won
