= The Barons =

2009 film

- Film poster
- French: Les barons
- Directed by: Nabil Ben Yadir
- Written by: Nabil Ben Yadir; Laurent Brandenbourger; Sébastien Fernandez
- Cinematography: Danny Elsen
- Edited by: Damien Keyeux
- Music by: Imhotep
- Release dates: 2 September 2009 (Namur Film Festival); 4 November 2009 (Belgium)
- Running time: 111 minutes
- Countries: Belgium; France
- Languages: French; Dutch; Arabic

The Barons (French: Les barons) is a 2009 Belgian comedy film directed by Nabil Ben Yadir. It was written by Yadir, Laurent Brandenbourger and Sébastien Fernandez. It premiered on 2 September 2009 at the Festival International du Film Francophone de Namur. The film was nominated for six Magritte Awards, winning Best Supporting Actor for Jan Decleir.

== Cast ==
- Nader Boussandel as Hassan
- Mourade Zeguendi as Mounir
- Mounir Ait Hamou as Aziz
- Julien Courbey as Franck Tabla
- Jan Decleir as Lucien
- Fellag as 'R.G.'
- Édouard Baer as Jacques
- Amelle Chahbi as Malika
- Melissa Djaouzi as Milouda
- Salah Eddine Ben Moussa as Kader
- Jean-Luc Couchard as Ozgür
- Virginie Efira as the artist
