= Philippe Vilain =

French writer

Philippe Vilain is a French man of letters, writer, essayist, doctor of modern literature of the University of Paris III: Sorbonne Nouvelle.

== Biography ==
His literary work presents itself as an exploration of the consciousness of love: jealousy (L'Étreinte), the guilt of not loving enough (Le Renoncement), commitment (L'Été à Dresde), adultery (Paris l'après-midi, La Femme infidèle), paternity (Faux-père), shyness (Confession d’un timide), cultural and social difference (Pas son genre).

His theoretical work questions contemporary literature (Dans le séjour des corps. Essai sur Marguerite Duras) and Autofiction. A new defining pact is advanced in L’autofiction en théorie; Fiction homonymique ou anominale qu’un individu fait de sa vie ou d’une partie de celle-ci.

After La Dernière Année (adapted to theatre -Proscenium- by Jean-Paul Muel in 2002,) Paris l'après-midi (Prix François Mauriac of the Académie française 2007,) Pas son genre, his seventh novel (prix Scrivere per amore 2012 in Italy,) was the subject of a cinematographic adaptation by director Lucas Belvaux in 2014, under the same title.

In April 2013, at the International Symposium Les intermittences du sujet : écritures de soi et discontinu (1913-2013), the University of Upper Alsace welcomed Philippe Vilain for a day of study on his work. A university book was published following this study day: Philippe Vilain ou la dialectique des genres, under the direction of Arnaud Schmitt and Philippe Weigel, which brought together contributions of Pierre Brunel, Jean Pierrot, Marc Dambre and Frédérique Toudoire-Surlapierre.

His novel La Femme infidèle was awarded the Prix Jean-Freustié in 2013.

Villain is an associate member of CERACC (Centre d'Etudes sur le Roman des Années Cinquante au Contemporain) at the university Sorbonne-Nouvelle Paris III.

== Recognition and awards ==
- Prix François Mauriac of the Académie française 2007 for Paris l'après-midi
- Prix Scrivere per amore 2012 in Italy for Pas son genre
- Prix Jean Freustié 2013 for La Femme infidèle
- Prix Méditerranée 2023 for La Malédition de la Madone

== Works ==
=== Novels ===
- 1997: L'Étreinte, Éditions Gallimard, ISBN 2070750647
- 1999: La Dernière Année, Gallimard, ISBN 2070756580
- 2001: Le Renoncement, novel, Gallimard, ISBN 2070763064
- 2003: L'Été à Dresde, novel, Gallimard, ISBN 2070727904
- 2006: Paris l'après-midi, Éditions Grasset, ISBN 2246672813, Prix François Mauriac of the Académie française 2007
- 2008: Faux-père, Grasset, ISBN 2246717310
- 2011: Pas son genre, Grasset, ISBN 2246771013, (reissued in 2014 at the time of the cinematographic adaptation of Lucas Belvaux Pas son genre), Prix Scrivere per amore 2012 in Italy
- 2013: La Femme infidèle, Grasset, ISBN 2246792037, Prix Jean Freustié 2013
- 2015: Une idée de l'enfer, Grasset

=== Essays ===
- 2005: Défense de Narcisse, followed by an interview with Serge Doubrovsky, Grasset
- 2005: Retours à Hugo, photographs by Jean-Luc Chapin, Confluences
- 2009: L'Autofiction en théorie, followed by two interviews with Philippe Sollers and Philippe Lejeune, La Transparence
- 2009: Confession d'un timide, Grasset
- 2010: Dans le séjour des corps. Essay on Marguerite Duras, La Transparence, series "Essais d'esthétique"
- 2011: Dit-il. Based on L'Été 80 by Marguerite Duras, éditions Cécile Defaut
- 2011: Éloge de l'arrogance, Éditions du Rocher
- 2016: La littérature sans idéal, Grasset, ISBN 2246809177
- 2020: La Passion d'Orphée, Grasset.

=== Preface ===
- Le donjuanisme est un humanisme, preface Don Juan [1665] by Molière, Hatier, 2009.

=== Interviews ===
- Je interdit ?, information gathered by Anne Crignon, Le Nouvel Observateur, n° 2101, 10–16 February 2005.
- Philippe Vilain l’immoraliste, information gathered by Emmanuelle Desforges, Littéréalité (University of Toronto), vol. XVIII, n° 2, Autumn/Winter 2006, p. 27-33.
- Entre Egoismo e generosidade, interview with Miguel Conde, O Globo, Prosa § Verso (Brazil), 17 November 2007.
- L’amour, comme pour Stendhal, est ma grande affaire, interview with Vincent Roy. Transfuge, April 2011.
- L’amore ? E una questione di soldi, interview with Gianni Rossi Barilli, Grazia (Italy), n° 10, 5 March 2012.
- Tout le monde est écrivain sauf moi (2003), in Philippe Sollers. Fugues, Gallimard, 2012.

=== Television ===
- Bouillon de culture, hosted by Bernard Pivot, France 2, 15 October 1999
- Ce soir ou jamais, hosted by Frédéric Taddeï, France 3, 23 November 2006

== Adaptations of his works ==
=== Theatre ===
- La Dernière Année, adapted to theatre -Proscenium- by Jean-Paul Muel in 2002.

=== Cinema ===
- Not My Type, based on his eponymous novel, French film directed by Lucas Belvaux, 2014.

== Bibliography ==
=== Articles ===
- Johan Faerber (Université Paris III), Une vie sans histoire. Ou l’impact autobiographique dans l’œuvre de Philippe Vilain, Revue de Littérature Comparée (Autobiographies), January–March 2008, p. 131-140.
- Philippe Gasparini, Autofiction. Une aventure du langage.- Paris: Éditions du Seuil, series "Poétique", 2008, p. 262-266.
- Sabine Van Wesemael (Université d’Amsterdam), Philippe Vilain se penche sur le miroir de son enfance, Actes du Colloque Relations familiales dans les littératures française et francophones des XXe et XXIe siècles : la figure de la mère, Université de Pau, 26 October 2006, Paris, L’Harmattan, 2008, p. 47-56.

=== Printed press ===
- Christine Rousseau, 'J’ai le sentiment d’être écrit par l’écriture', in Le Monde des Livres, 3 October 2008.
- Sophie Pujas, Philippe Vilain : Vaine pudeur, Transfuge, June 2010.
- Emmanuel Gehrig, L'audace du timide, Le Temps (Switzerland), August 2010.
