= The Hive (2021 film) =

2021 film directed by Alice Winocour

- French: La Ruche
- Directed by: Christophe Hermans
- Written by: Christophe Hermans; Noëmie Nicolas
- Based on: La Ruche by Arthur Loustalot
- Produced by: Jean-Yves Roubin; Cassandre Warnauts
- Starring: Ludivine Sagnier
- Cinematography: Colin Lévêque
- Edited by: Joël Mann
- Release date: 15 October 2021 (Rome)
- Running time: 89 minutes
- Countries: Belgium; France
- Language: French

The Hive (French: La Ruche) is a 2021 drama film written and directed by Christophe Hermans. The story is based on the 2013 novel La Ruche by Arthur Loustalot. The film focuses on the relationship between Alice (Ludivine Sagnier), a mother, and her three daughters.

The film premiered at the 2021 Rome Film Festival. At the 12th Magritte Awards, The Hive received five nominations, including Best Film and Best Director for Hermans.

== Cast ==
- Ludivine Sagnier as Alice
- Sophie Breyer as Marion
- Mara Taquin as Claire
- Bonnie Duvauchelle as Louise
