= Approved for Adoption =

- French theatrical release poster
- Directed by: Laurent Boileau; Jung
- Written by: Jung; Laurent Boileau
- Produced by: Thomas Schimitt; Patrick Quinet
- Edited by: Ewin Ryckaert
- Music by: Siegfried Canto; Little Comet
- Production companies: Artémis Productions; Mosaïque Films
- Distributed by: Cinéart (Belgium); Gebeka Films (France)
- Release date: June 6, 2012 (France)
- Running time: 70 minutes
- Countries: France; Belgium; South Korea; Switzerland
- Language: French

Approved for Adoption (French: Couleur de peau: miel lit. "Colour of skin: honey") is a 2012 animated film, based on a comic by the Korean-Belgian comic strip artist, Jung, and directed by Laurent Boileau and Jung. It was released on 6 June 2012, in France. It received a Magritte Award nomination for Best Editing.

== Cast ==
- Christelle Cornil : Jung's adoptive mother
- Jean-Luc Couchard : Jung's adoptive father
- David Murgia : Cédric

== Awards ==
- 2013 - Japan Media Arts Festival: "Grand Prize" (Animation)
- 2013 - World festival of animated film Animafest Zagreb: "Grand prix"
- 2013 - World festival of animated film Animafest Zagreb: "Audience award"
