= Laurent Brandenbourger =

Belgian screenwriter and film director

Laurent Brandenbourger is a Belgian screenwriter and film director. In 2009, he co-wrote with Nabil Ben Yadir and Sébastien Fernandez the comedy film The Barons, for which he received a nomination for the Magritte Award for Best Screenplay.
