= Murder of Ihsane Jarfi =

2012 homophobic murder in Liège, Belgium

- Location: 50°29′55.14″N 5°20′59.32″E; Liège, Belgium
- Date: April 22, 2012
- Attack type: Blunt trauma
- Deaths: Ihsane Jarfi

Ihsane Jarfi (1980 – 2012) was murdered in Liège, Belgium in April 2012. It was the first case of homophobic murder recognized under Belgian law.

== Incident ==
Ihsane Jarfi, a 32-year-old Belgian gay man, disappeared on April 22, 2012. He was last seen leaving the Open Bar, a gay bar in the center of Liège, in a car with four other men.

According to one of the four suspects arrested, they first struck him while in the car "to teach the homo a lesson". His attackers then stripped him and beat him, causing very serious injuries, including 17 rib fractures. They stole his money and his cell phone and left him naked and bleeding. The medical examiner established that he died between 4 and 6 hours after he was left in a field. His body was found by two hikers nine days later, on May 1, 2012.

Mutlu Kizilaslan, Jeremy Wintgens, Jonathan Lekeu and Eric Parmentier were charged with homophobic murder in February 2014. They were also charged with theft with several aggravating circumstances, including that of having committed murder to facilitate the theft or ensure impunity, torture and inhuman and degrading treatment, acts of serious humiliation or degradation, and kidnapping.

In December 2014, following a trial that began in November, the Liège Assize Court convicted Mutlu Kizilaslan, Jérémy Wintgens and Eric Parmentier to life imprisonment for having committed the homophobic assassination of Ihsane Jarfi. Jonathan Lekeu was sentenced to 30 years in prison for a homophobic murder.

== Media ==
=== Book ===
- Ihsane Jarfi's father, of North African origin, wrote a book in 2013 entitled Ihsane Jarfi: le couloir du deuil (Ihsane Jarfi: The Passageway of Mourning) ISBN 978-2875422187, in which he discusses the events leading up to the murder and condemns intolerance, whether it affects homosexuals, Muslims, or any other minority.

=== Television documentary ===
- Le crépuscule d'Ihsane (The Twilight of Ihsane) broadcast November 20, 2013 and July 23, 2014, on Devoir d'enquête sur la Une (RTBF).

=== Theater ===
La reprise, Histoire(s) du théâtre (I), conceived and directed by Milo Rau and performed by NTGent, premiered at the Kunstenfestivaldesarts in Brussels in 2017. It was presented at Créations Studio in Brussels in 2017 and 2018, and at the Edinburgh Festival in August 2019. It was a five-act narrative of the events leading up to the murder presented through video and live performance.

=== Film ===
- Animals, a 2021 film, was inspired by the murder of Ishane Jarfi and is dedicated to his memory.

== See also ==
- LGBT rights in Belgium
