= Soufiane Chilah =

Belgian actor

- Born: October 1991; Brussels, Belgium
- Education: Erasmushogeschool Brussel
- Occupations: Stage and film actor
- Years active: 2014–present

Soufiane Chilah (born October 1991) is a Belgian actor working in theatre, film and television.

After developing an interest in acting, Chilah studied performing arts at the Erasmus Brussels University of Applied Sciences and Arts and graduated from there. He began working in theatre appearing in productions from Belgium and France. He made his film debut in Black (2015), a crime film directed by Adil El Arbi and Bilall Fallah. His acting credits include Home (2016), Tabula Rasa (2017), The Team (2018), War of the Worlds (2019), Animals (2021), and Faithfully Yours (2022).

He received a Magritte Award for Most Promising Actor for his work in Blind Spot (2017).

== Filmography ==
Year	Title	Role	Notes
2015	Black	Nassim	
2016	Home	Friend	
2017	Blind Spot	Dries	Magritte Award for Most Promising Actor
2017	Tabula Rasa	Omar	TV series
2018	The Team	Faris Arnaut	TV series
2019	War of the Worlds	Yanis	TV series
2021	Animals	Brahim	Nominated—Magritte Award for Best Actor
2022	Faithfully Yours	Beau Alami	
