= Stephan Streker =

Belgian film director and screenwriter

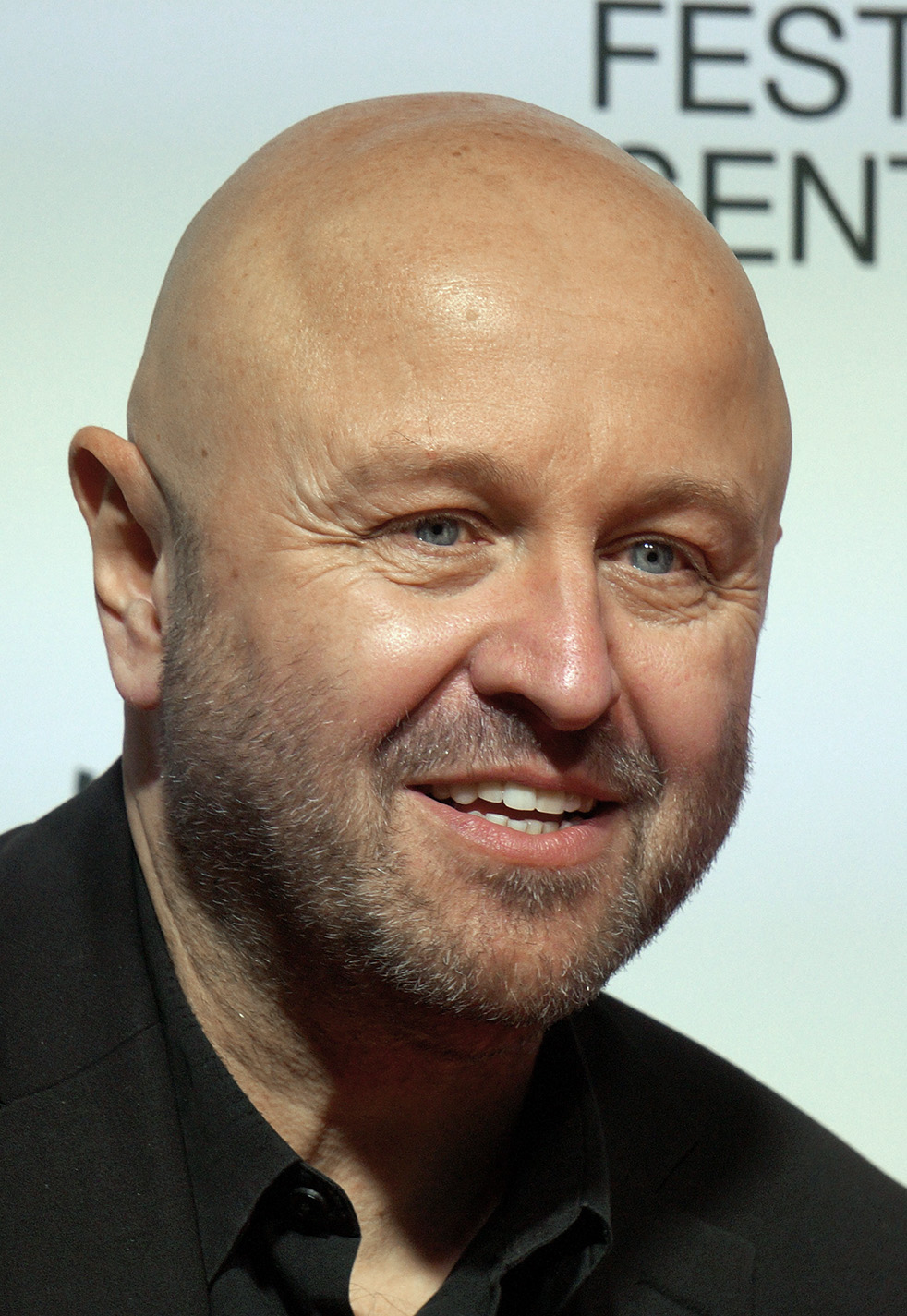
- Stephan Streker in 2016.
- Born: 17 March 1964 (age 61); Brussels, Belgium
- Occupation(s): Film Director, Screenwriter

Stephan Streker is a Belgian film director and screenwriter.

== Biography ==
Stephan Streker was born in Brussels, and first became a journalist with the aim of meeting the people he admired most in the world – filmmakers. In this capacity, he published lengthy interviews for the Belgian press.

He also worked as a film critic for both radio and print media and as a photographer (artistic, press and portraiture), producing numerous album covers.

In parallel to these occupations, Stephan was a sports journalist, specializing in soccer and boxing.

A Wedding (Noces) is his third feature-length film following Michael Blanco (2004), shot “guerilla” style in Los Angeles with the help of a few friends, and The World Belongs to Us (2013) starring Vincent Rottiers, Olivier Gourmet and Reda Kateb. A Wedding has been selected in over 40 Film Festivals worldwide, earning more than 15 awards. The movie has been nominated at the César 2018 in the category Best Foreign Film.

In addition to his job as a filmmaker, Streker is also a soccer consultant for Belgian national television (RTBF), in particular for all games involving the Red Devils (the national team), and also for the weekly television show La Tribune.

== Filmography ==
=== Short movies ===
- 1993 : Shadow Boxing
- 1996 : Mathilde, Pierre's Wife (Mathilde, la femme de Pierre)
- 1998 : Day of the Fight (Le jour du combat), documentary

=== Feature films ===
- 2004 : Michael Blanco
- 2013 : The World Belongs to Us
- 2017 : A Wedding (Noces)
- 2021 : L'ennemi
