= Damien Keyeux =

Belgian film editor

Damien Keyeux is a film editor with more than thirty film credits. His credits include The Barons (2009), Illegal (2010), When Pigs Have Wings (2011), Horses of God (2012), Much Loved (2015), and Trainee Day (2016). He received two Magritte Awards for Best Editing for his work in The Marchers (2013) and Mothers' Instinct (2018).
