= Ewin Ryckaert =

Belgian film editor

Ewin Ryckaert is a film editor with more than seventy film credits. He was nominated for the Magritte Award for Best Editing four times for his work in The Giants (2011), Approved for Adoption (2012), Tango libre (2012) and All Cats Are Grey (2014). His editing credits also include Step by Step (2002), Gilles' Wife (2004), Waiter (2006), Puppylove (2013), and The Assistant (2015).
