= Nabil Ben Yadir =

Belgian film director, screenwriter and producer

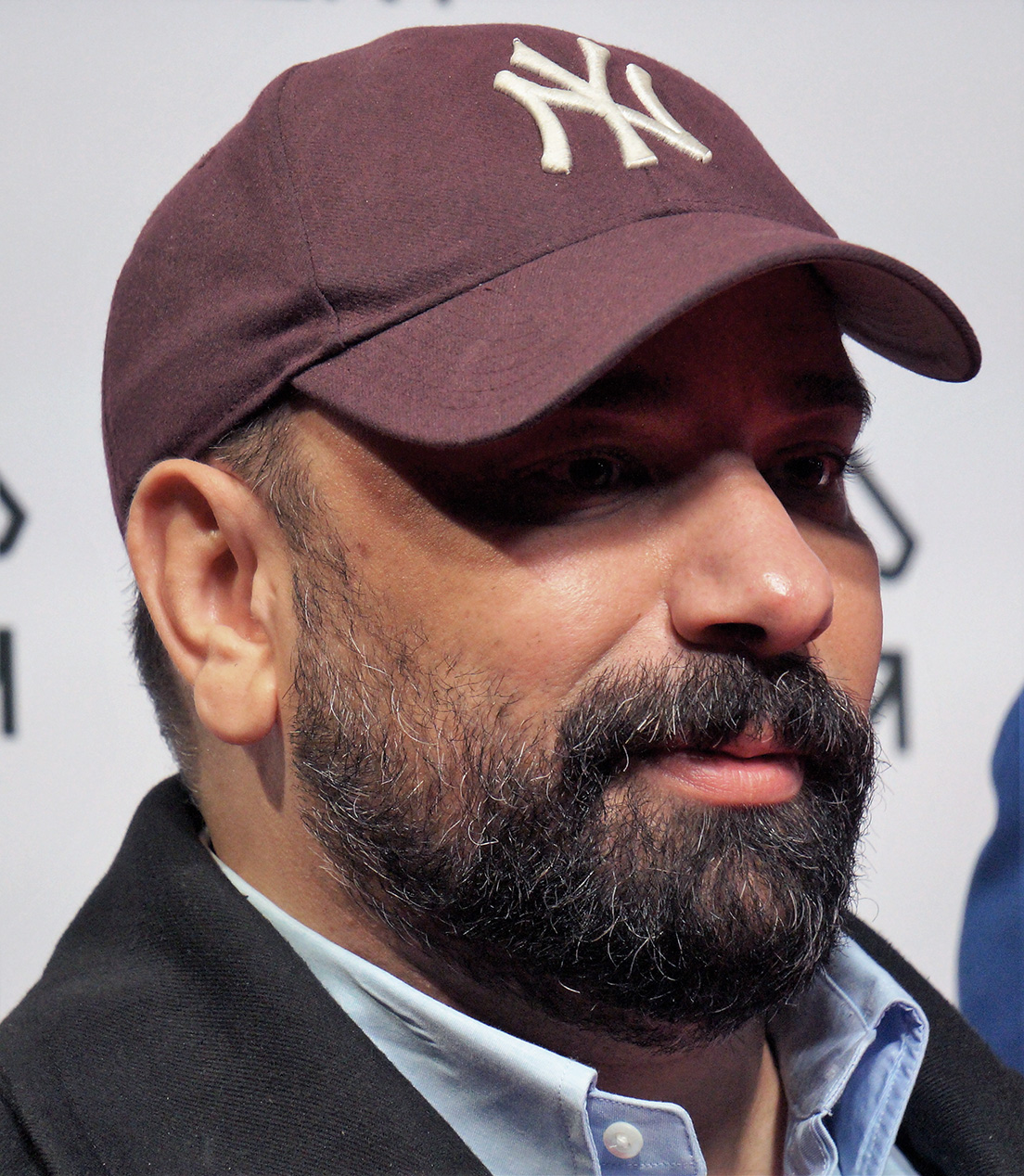
- Ben Yadir at the 2021 Film Fest Ghent
- Born: 24 February 1979 (age 46); Brussels, Belgium
- Occupation(s): Director, screenwriter, producer
- Years active: 2001–present

Nabil Ben Yadir (born 24 February 1979) is a Belgian film director, screenwriter and producer.

== Career ==
Ben Yadir made his feature-length directorial debut in 2009 with The Barons, which he also co-wrote with Laurent Brandenbourger and Sébastien Fernandez. The film was nominated for six Magritte Awards, including Best Director and Best Screenplay. His second feature, The Marchers, was screened in Official Competition at Cannes. Filming for a political thriller, Blind Spot (Dode Hoek), set against Belgium's Flemish-French divide, began in the spring of 2014.

Before becoming a filmmaker, Ben Yadir worked on an assembly line for Volkswagen. He spent "months on end doing exactly the same thing". This influenced his choice to select a different genre for each of his films: "now I make sure that I always take new challenges and adopt new approaches". Ben Yadir has a film production company called L'Antilope Joyeuse. His next film, Animals (2021), was based on the 2012 murder of gay man Ihsane Jarfi.

== Filmography ==
Film
Year	Title	Contribution	Notes
2009	The Barons (Les Barons)	Director/Writer	Marrakech International Film Festival Special Jury Award; Nominated—Magritte Award for Best Film; Nominated—Magritte Award for Best Director; Nominated—Magritte Award for Best Screenplay
2013	The Marchers (La Marche)	Director/Writer	Nominated—Lumière Award for Best Screenplay; Nominated—Magritte Award for Best Film; Nominated—Magritte Award for Best Director; Nominated—Magritte Award for Best Screenplay
2017	Blind Spot (Dode Hoek)	Director/Writer/Producer	Nominated—Magritte Award for Best Film; Nominated—Magritte Award for Best Director
2021	Animals	Director/Writer/Producer	Nominated—Magritte Award for Best Film; Nominated—Magritte Award for Best Director; Nominated—Magritte Award for Best Screenplay
