= Alain Dessauvage =

Belgian film editor

Alain Dessauvage is a Belgian film editor. His editing credits include Moscow, Belgium (2008), Oxygen (2010), Frits and Freddy (2010), Comrade Kim Goes Flying (2012), The Resurrection of a Bastard (2013), The Ardennes (2015), Couple in a Hole (2015), Flemish Heaven (2016), Racer and the Jailbird (2017), and Girl (2018). He received the Magritte Award for Best Editing for his work on Bullhead (2011).

== Selected filmography ==
- 2008: Aanrijding in Moscou
- 2009: Limo
- 2010: Adem
- 2010: Frits & Freddy
- 2011: Rundskop
- 2012: Offline
- 2012: Comrade Kim Goes Flying
- 2013: De wederopstanding van een klootzak
- 2013: Brasserie Romantiek
- 2013: Hemel op aarde
- 2014: Trouw met mij!
- 2015: The Sky Above Us
- 2015: Couple In A Hole
- 2015: D'Ardennen
- 2016: Le Ciel Flamand
- 2017: Le Fidèle (Racer and the Jailbird)
- 2018: Girl
- 2018: De Patrick
- 2020: The Silencing
- 2024: Small Things like These
- 2026: Skateboarding Is Not for Girls
- 2026: Coward
