= Home (2016 Belgian film) =

2016 film

- Film poster
- Directed by: Fien Troch
- Written by: Fien Troch
- Produced by: Antonino Lombardo; Jacques-Henri Bronckart; Olivier Bronckart
- Starring: Sebastian Van Dun
- Music by: Johnny Jewel
- Release date: 3 September 2016 (Venice)
- Running time: 103 minutes
- Country: Belgium
- Language: Dutch

Home is a 2016 Belgian drama film directed by Fien Troch.

== Plot ==
Kevin is released from youth prison. He got there after he knocked down a man and left him behind as being dead. As his father does not want him to come back, Kevin moves in at his aunt Sonja and uncle Willem who have a son Sammy.

Sammy is befriended with the shy, introvert John. John’s mother is a lunatic. Besides a separation anxiety disorder, she has mysophobia and thinks her son smells. That’s why the boy must shower multiple times a day. She also divided the living room in imaginary areas which John may or may not enter. She does not permit John to stay with his friends for a long time, to have dinner with them or to stay there for the night. She also harasses John sexually. John did speak the madness of his mother with some teachers but nobody believes him. Furthermore his mother is manipulative and convinces everyone she is the victim as “being the solid mother with an unmanageable, respectless son”.

One evening, Sammy and Kevin wait outside the house of John. As he does not show up, they enter the house. They find the mother of John half unconscious and full of blood. John sits at the other side of the room in shock. He has just beaten up his mother after he found out she cut the tires of his bike so he would stay with her for the rest of the evening instead of going out with his friends. After she is punched to the ground by Kevin, John strangles her. Sammy just watches not knowing how to react. Her corpse is put in her car. Kevin and Sammy go home to wash their clothes whilst John drives the corpse away.

John is stopped by the police who finds the body in the trunk. The police starts an investigation and they are sure the skinny John would most probably not be able to strangle his mother let alone that he moved the corpse in the car. They also find out Sammy is befriended with Kevin and that Kevin once posted a message on Facebook he would like to kill someone. That’s why Kevin and Sonja must go to the police station for interrogation. Kevin claims not to be involved with the murder and the message on Facebook does not have value. Sonja thinks the police only accuses Kevin as he was in youth prison.

Sammy can’t handle the incident and tells his mother what happened. She is in shock but tells to keep this a secret, not to protect Kevin nor to have John released. She is afraid her son will be found guilty as he did not help a person in danger. At same time, the police tries to convince John to tell the truth but he stays with his story he murdered his mother and nobody else was involved.

== Cast ==
- Sebastian Van Dun as Kevin
- Mistral Guidotti as John
- Loïc Batog
- Lena Suijkerbuijk
- Karlijn Sileghem

== Production ==
Home is a drama film directed by Belgian director Fien Troch.

== Release ==
Home premiered at the 73rd Venice International Film Festival on 3 September 2016. It was also screened in the Platform section at the 2016 Toronto International Film Festival.

== Accolades ==
At the 73rd Venice International Film Festival, Troch won the award for Best Director in the Horizons section.

Home received the André Cavens Award for Best Film by the Belgian Film Critics Association (UCC).

It also received four nominations at the 8th Magritte Awards, winning Best Flemish Film.

In addition, the film received the Georges Delerue Award for Best Soundtrack/Sound Design at Film Fest Gent in 2016.
