= Ludo Troch =

Belgian film editor

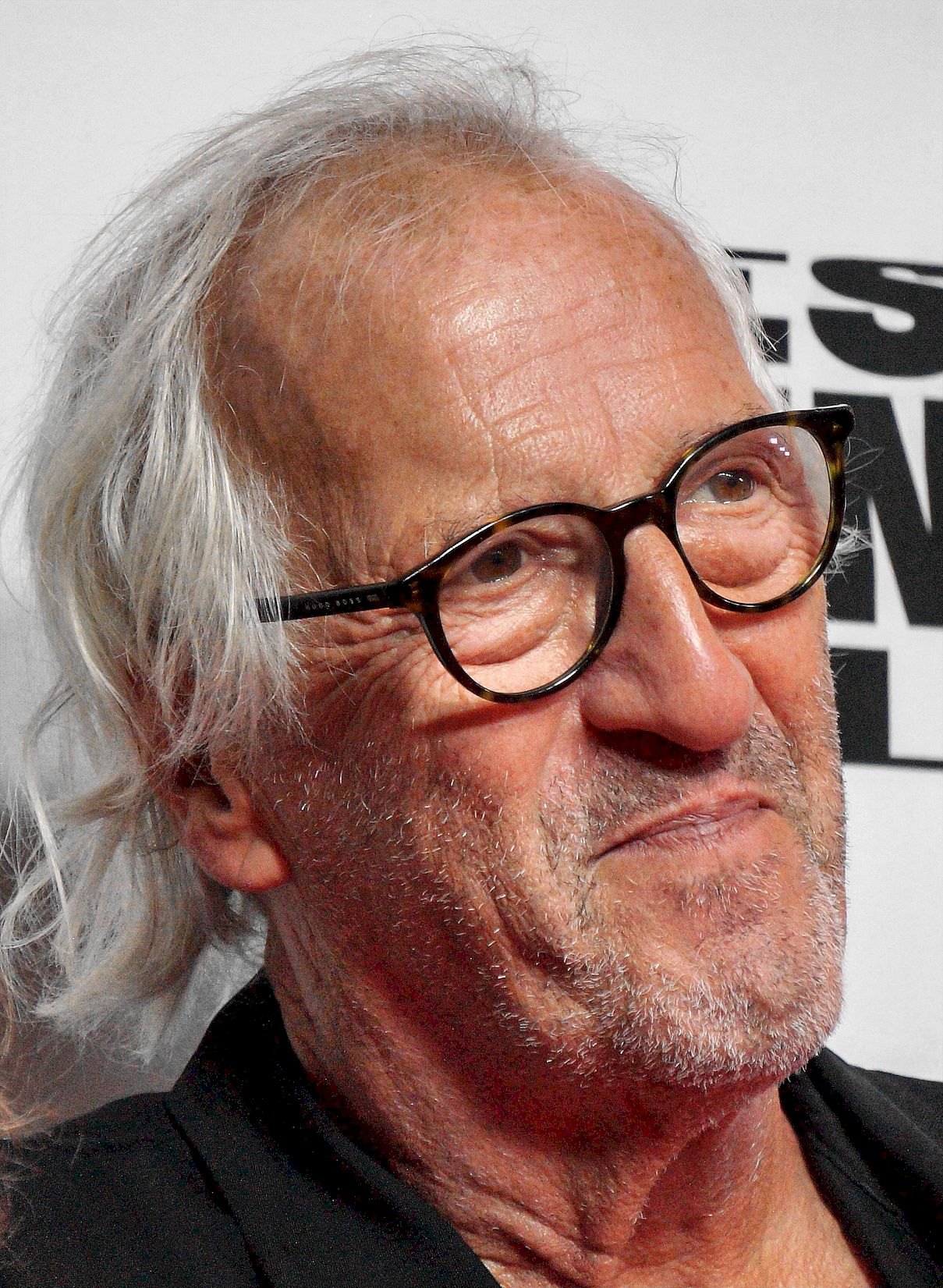
- Ludo Troch at Film Fest Ghent (2023)
- Born: Belgium
- Occupations: film editor, actor

Ludo Troch is a film editor with more than sixty film credits. His editing credits include Le Concert, A Distant Neighborhood, Séraphine, Live and Become, Everybody's Famous!, Violette and The History of Love. Troch received the César Award for Best Editing for Cavale (2002). He was also nominated for the Magritte Award for Best Editing three times for his work in Le Concert, One Night and Not My Type.

== Select filmography ==
- Sea of Silence (2003)
