= 14th Magritte Awards =

2025 Belgian film awards ceremony

- Official poster
- Date: 22 February 2025
- Site: Flagey; Ixelles, Belgium
- Hosted by: Charline Vanhoenacker

Highlights
- Best Film: Night Call
- Most awards: Night Call (10)
- Most nominations: Night Call (11)

Television coverage
- Network: RTBF

The 14th Magritte Awards ceremony, presented by the Académie André Delvaux, honored the best films of 2024 in Belgium. It took place on 22 February 2025 at the Flagey, in the historic site of Place Eugène Flagey, Ixelles, beginning at 8:20 p.m. CET. During the ceremony, the Académie André Delvaux presented Magritte Awards in 22 categories. The ceremony was streamed in Belgium on Auvio, with a special broadcast on La Une. Actress Déborah François presided the ceremony, while comedian Charline Vanhoenacker hosted the show for the first time.

The nominees for the 14th Magritte Awards were announced on 21 January 2025. Films with the most nominations were Night Call with eleven, followed by Amal and Through the Night with nine, and It's Raining in the House with eight. Night Call won a record of ten awards, including Best Film and Best Director for Michiel Blanchart. Other winners included It's Raining in the House with three awards, Amal, Green Border, Julie Keeps Quiet, Life's a Bitch, The Most Precious of Cargoes, and Savages with one.

== Winners and nominees ==
=== Awards ===
Winners are listed first, highlighted in boldface, and indicated with a double dagger (‡).

| **Best Film**: **Night Call – produced by Michaël Goldberg; directed by Michiel Blanchart ‡**; Amal – produced by Geneviève Lemal; directed by Jawad Rhalib; It's Raining in the House – produced by Sébastien Andrés and Alice Lemaire; directed by Paloma Sermon-Daï; A Missing Part – produced by Jacques-Henri Bronckart; directed by Guillaume Senez; Through the Night – produced by Jacques-Henri Bronckart; directed by Delphine Girard | **Best Director**: **Michiel Blanchart – Night Call ‡**; Delphine Girard – Through the Night; Jawad Rhalib – Amal; Paloma Sermon-Daï – It's Raining in the House |
| **Best Actor**: **Arieh Worthalter – Life's a Bitch as Franck ‡**; Bouli Lanners – Smoke Signals as José Bové; Benoît Poelvoorde – The Art of Nothing as Yves Machond; Jean-Jacques Rausin – Life's a Bitch as Tom | **Best Actress**: **Lubna Azabal – Amal as Amal ‡**; Selma Alaoui – Through the Night as Aly Belal; Veerle Baetens – Through the Night as Anna; Emilie Dequenne – Don't Worry as Emma's mother |
| **Best Supporting Actor**: **Jonas Bloquet – Night Call as Theo ‡**; Thomas Mustin – Night Call as Remy; Benoît Poelvoorde – Beating Hearts as La Brosse; Fabrizio Rongione – Amal as Nabil | **Best Supporting Actress**: **Louise Manteau – It's Raining in the House as Leïla ‡**; Claire Bodson – Julie Keeps Quiet as Sofie; Lucie Debay – Clenched Fist as Lucie; Catherine Salée – Amal as the headmistress of the high school |
| **Most Promising Actor**: **Makenzy Lombet – It's Raining in the House as Makenzy ‡**; Amine Hamidou – Amal as Rayan; Mehdi Khachachi – Amal as Rachid; Lou Goossens – Young Hearts as Elias | **Most Promising Actress**: **Purdey Lombet – It's Raining in the House as Purdey ‡**; Kenza Benbouchta – Amal as Monia; Mara Taquin – Life's a Bitch as Cécile; Tessa Van Den Broeck – Julie Keeps Quiet as Julie |
| **Best Screenplay**: **Night Call – Michiel Blanchart ‡**; Amal – Jawad Rhalib, David Lambert, and Chloé Léonil; Life's a Bitch – Xavier Seron; Through the Night – Delphine Girard | **Best First Feature Film**: **Night Call – directed by Michiel Blanchart; produced by Michaël Goldberg ‡**; Camping du lac – directed by Éléonore Saintagnan; produced by Sébastien Andres and Alice Lemaire; It's Raining in the House – directed by Paloma Sermon-Daï; produced by Sébastien Andres and Alice Lemaire; Through the Night – directed by Delphine Girard; produced by Jacques-Henri Bronckart |
| **Best Cinematography**: **Night Call – Sylvestre Vannoorenberghe ‡**; It's Raining in the House – Frédéric Noirhomme; Through the Night – Juliette Van Dormael | **Best Editing**: **Night Call – Matthieu Jamet-Louis ‡**; A Missing Part – Julie Brenta; Through the Night – Damien Keyeux |
| **Best Original Score**: **Green Border – Frédéric Vercheval ‡**; **Savages – Charles de Ville and Nelly Tungang ‡**; The Art of Nothing – Casimir Liberski | **Best Sound**: **Night Call – David Vranken, David Gillain, Joey Van Impe, Thibaud Rie, Fabrice Grizard, Antoine Wattier, and Vincent Gregorio ‡**; A Missing Part – Nicolas Paturle, Virginie Messiaen, Franco Piscopo, and Olivier Thys; Life's a Bitch – Marie Paulus, Valérie Le Docte, and Philippe Charbonnel |
| **Best Production Design**: **Night Call – Catherine Cosme ‡**; It's Raining in the House – Ladys Oliviera Silva; Through the Night – Eve Martin | **Best Costume Design**: **Night Call – Isabel Van Renterghem ‡**; A Missing Part – Julie Lebrun; Life's a Bitch – Élise Abraham and Manon Golembieski |
| **Best Documentary Film**: **Your Mother – directed by Samira El Mouzghibati; produced by Alice Lemaire ‡**; Mea culpa – directed by Patrick Tass; produced by Ellen Meiresonne; Waiting for Zorro – directed by Sarah Moon Howe; produced by Françoise Levie; Who Cares – directed by Alexe Poukine; produced by Benoît Roland | **Best Documentary Short Film**: **The Living – directed by Inès Rabadán; produced by Anne-Laure Guégan and Géraldine Sprimont ‡**; Crushed – directed by Camille Vigny; produced by Julie Freres; Irréprochables – directed by Flore Mercier, Sophie Breyer, and Angèle Bardoux; produced by Robin Dagallier; The Tunes – produced by Julie Freres; directed by Pablo Guarise |
| **Best Animated Short Film**: **In Thousand Petals – directed by Louise Bongartz; produced by Bastien Martin ‡**; The Birds – directed by Christel Hortz; produced by Bastien Martin; Head in the Clouds – directed by Rémi Durin; produced by Arnaud Demuynck; Muscle Man in: Metal Mayhem – directed by Nicolas Gemoets; produced by Vincent Gilot | **Best Fiction Short Film**: **Eldorado – directed by Mathieu Volpe; produced by Sebastian Schelenz ‡**; Invincible Summer – directed by Arnaud Dufeys; produced by Arnaud Ponthière and Arnaud Dufeys; Know Your Place – directed by Marie Chauderlot; produced by Vincent Terlinchamp; Water Cooler War – directed by Lisa Sallustio; produced by Pierre Foulon |
| **Best Flemish Film**: **Julie Keeps Quiet – directed by Leonardo Van Dijl; produced by Gilles Coulier, Gilles De Schryver, and Wouter Sap, coproduced by Delphine Tomson, and Jean-Pierre and Luc Dardenne ‡**; Here – directed by Bas Devos; produced by Marc Goyens and Nabil Ben Yadir; Skunk – directed by Koen Mortier; produced by Eurydice Gysel; Young Hearts – directed by Anthony Schatteman; produced by Xavier Rombaut and Annabella Nezri | **Best Foreign Film in Coproduction**: **The Most Precious of Cargoes (France) – coproduced by Delphine Tomson, and Jean-Pierre and Luc Dardenne; directed by Michel Hazanavicius ‡**; Animale (France) – coproduced by Cassandre Warnauts and Jean-Yves Roubin; directed by Emma Benestan; Io capitano (Italy) – coproduced by Joseph Rouschop; directed by Matteo Garrone; Savages (Switzerland) – coproduced by Vincent Tavier and Hugo Deghilage; directed by Claude Barras |

==== Honorary Magritte Award ====
The Honorary Magritte Award was granted to French actor and director Gilles Lellouche, as announced by the Academie André Delvaux on 14 February 2025.

== Films with multiple nominations and awards ==
The following ten films received multiple nominations.

- Eleven: Night Call
- Nine: Amal, Through the Night
- Eight: It's Raining in the House
- Six: Life's a Bitch
- Four: A Missing Part
- Three: Julie Keeps Quiet
- Two: The Art of Nothing, Savages, Young Hearts

The following two films received multiple awards.

- Ten: Night Call
- Three: It's Raining in the House

== See also ==
- 2024 in film
- 50th César Awards
- 30th Lumière Awards
