= Magritte Award for Most Promising Actress =

Belgian film award

- Presented by: Académie André Delvaux
- First award: 2011
- Currently held by: María Cavalier-Bazan, Heads or Fails (2025)
- Website: lesmagritteducinema.com

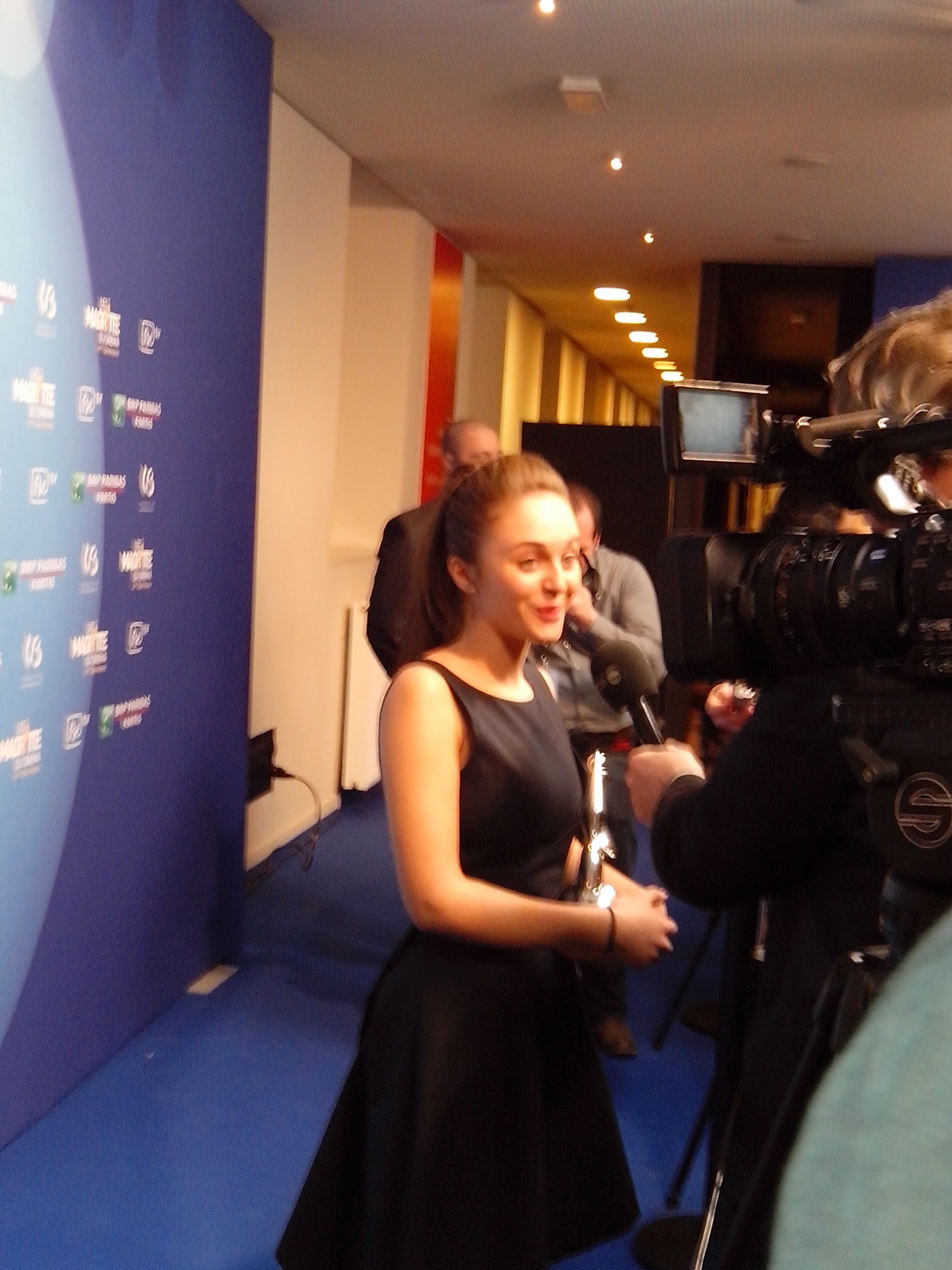

The Magritte Award for Most Promising Actress (French: Magritte du meilleur espoir féminin) is an award presented annually by the Académie André Delvaux. It is given in honor of a young actress who has delivered an outstanding breakthrough performance while working within the film industry. It is one of the Magritte Awards, which were established to recognize excellence in Belgian cinematic achievements.

The 1st Magritte Awards ceremony was held in 2011 with Pauline Étienne receiving the award for her role in Private Lessons. As of the 2026 ceremony, María Cavalier-Bazan is the most recent winner in this category for her role in Heads or Fails.

== Winners and nominees ==
In the list below, winners are listed first in the colored row, followed by the other nominees.

=== 2010s ===
Year	Actress	English title	Original title
2010 (1st)	Pauline Étienne	Private Lessons	Élève libre
2010 (1st)	Stéphanie Blanchoud	The Boat Race	La Régate
2010 (1st)	Anna Fransiska Jager	My Queen Karo	
2010 (1st)	Chloé Struvay	Motherly	Maternelle
2011 (2nd)	Erika Sainte	She's Not Crying, She's Singing	Elle ne pleure pas, elle chante
2011 (2nd)	Stéphanie Crayencour	Les Mythos	
2011 (2nd)	Jeanne Dandoy	Bullhead	Rundskop
2011 (2nd)	Hande Kodja	Marieke, Marieke	
2012 (3rd)	Anne-Pascale Clairembourg	Mobile Home	
2012 (3rd)	Pauline Burlet	Dead Man Talking	
2012 (3rd)	Mona Jabé	Miss Mouche	
2012 (3rd)	Aurora Marion	Almayer's Folly	La Folie Almayer
2013 (4th)	Pauline Burlet	The Past	Le Passé
2013 (4th)	Rania Mellouli	The Bag of Flour	Le Sac de farine
2013 (4th)	Anne Paulicevich	Tango libre	
2013 (4th)	Mona Walravens	Blue Is the Warmest Colour	La Vie d'Adèle – Chapitres 1 & 2
2014 (5th)	Ambre Grouwels	Baby Balloon	
2014 (5th)	Evelien Bosmans	Marina	
2014 (5th)	Hande Kodja	Rosenn	
2014 (5th)	Emilie Maréchal	Tokyo Anyway	
2015 (6th)	Lucie Debay	Melody	
2015 (6th)	Manon Capelle	All Cats Are Grey	Tous les chats sont gris
2015 (6th)	Pili Groyne	The Brand New Testament	Le Tout Nouveau Testament
2015 (6th)	Stéphanie Van Vyve	Être	
2016 (7th)	Salomé Richard	Baden Baden	
2016 (7th)	Martha Canga Antonio	Black	
2016 (7th)	Ghalia Benali	As I Open My Eyes	À peine j'ouvre les yeux
2016 (7th)	Jade Soentjens and Margaux Soentjens	After Love	L'Économie du couple
2017 (8th)	Maya Dory	Angel	Mon ange
2017 (8th)	Adriana de Fonseca	Even Lovers Get the Blues	
2017 (8th)	Fantine Harduin	Happy End	
2017 (8th)	Lena Suijkerbuik	Home	
2018 (9th)	Lena Girard Voss	Our Struggles	Nos batailles
2018 (9th)	Myriem Akheddiou	The Benefit of the Doubt	Une Part d'ombre
2018 (9th)	Bérénice Baoo	Above the Law	Tueurs
2018 (9th)	Nawell Madani	Stand Up Girl	C'est tout pour moi
2018 (9th)	Anaël Snoek	The Wild Boys	Les Garçons sauvages
2019 (10th)	Mya Bollaers	Lola	Lola vers la mer
2019 (10th)	Bebel Tshiani Baloji	Binti	
2019 (10th)	Victoria Bluck	Young Ahmed	Le Jeune Ahmed
2019 (10th)	Raphaëlle Corbisier	Escapada	

=== 2020s ===
Year	Actress	English title	Original title
2020/21 (11th)	Maya Vanderbeque	Playground	Un monde
2020/21 (11th)	Salomé Dewaels	Lost Illusions	Illusions perdues
2020/21 (11th)	Fantine Harduin	Adoration	
2020/21 (11th)	Daphné Patakia	Benedetta	
2022 (12th)	Sophie Breyer	The Hive	La Ruche
2022 (12th)	Mara Taquin	The Hive	La Ruche
2022 (12th)	Elsa Houben	Le Cœur noir des forêts	
2022 (12th)	Joely Mbundu	Tori and Lokita	Tori et Lokita
2023 (13th)	Zelda Samson	Love According to Dalva	Dalva
2023 (13th)	Laetitia Mampaka	Employee of the Month	L'Employée du mois
2023 (13th)	Bérangère McNeese	Let's Get Lost	Ailleurs si j'y suis
2023 (13th)	Mara Taquin	The Beast in the Jungle	La Bête dans la jungle
2024 (14th)	Purdey Lombet	It's Raining in the House	Il pleut dans la maison
2024 (14th)	Kenza Benbouchta	Amal	
2024 (14th)	Mara Taquin	Life's a Bitch	Chiennes de vie
2024 (14th)	Tessa Van Den Broeck	Julie Keeps Quiet	Julie zwijgt
2025 (15th)	María Cavalier-Bazan	Heads or Fails	
2025 (15th)	Janaïna Halloy Fokan	Young Mothers	Jeunes mères
2025 (15th)	Elsa Houben	Young Mothers	Jeunes mères
2025 (15th)	Adèle Pinckaers	We Believe You	On vous croit
