= Magritte Award for Best Sound =

Belgian film award

- Presented by: Académie André Delvaux
- First award: 2011
- Currently held by: Flow (2025)
- Website: lesmagritteducinema.com

The Magritte Award for Best Sound (French: Magritte du meilleur son) is an award presented annually by the Académie André Delvaux. It is one of the Magritte Awards, which were established to recognize excellence in Belgian cinematic achievements.

The 1st Magritte Awards ceremony was held in 2011 with Benoît Biral, Valene Leroy, Julien Paschal, and Fred Pie receiving the award for their work in A Town Called Panic. As of the 2025 ceremony, Philippe Charbonnel, Bertrand Boudaud, and Gurwal Coïc-Gallas are the most recent winners in this category for their work in Flow.

== Winners and nominees ==
In the list below, winners are listed first in the colored row, followed by the other nominees.

=== 2010s ===
Year	English title	Original title	Sound mixers
2010 (1st)	A Town Called Panic	Panique au village	Benoît Biral, Valene Leroy, Julien Paschal, and Fred Pie
2010 (1st)	Illegal	Illégal	Marc Bastien, François Dumont, and Thomas Gauder
2010 (1st)	Mr. Nobody		Emmanuel de Boissieu, Frédéric Demolder, and Dominique Warniert
2011 (2nd)	The Fairy	La Fée	Emmanuel de Boissieu, Fred Meert and Hélène Lamy-Au-Rousseau
2011 (2nd)	Bullhead	Rundskop	Benoît De Clerck, Yves De Mey, Quentin Collette, Christine Verschorren and Benoît Biral
2011 (2nd)	The Giants	Les Géants	Marc Bastien and Thomas Gauder
2012 (3rd)	The Minister	L'Exercice de l'État	Julie Brenta and Olivier Hespel
2012 (3rd)	One Night	38 témoins	Henri Morelle, Luc Thomas, and Aline Gavroy
2012 (3rd)	Our Children	À perdre la raison	Ingrid Simon and Thomas Gauder
2013 (4th)	Ernest & Celestine	Ernest et Célestine	Frédéric Demolder, Emmanuel de Boissieu, Luc Thomas, and Franco Piscopo
2013 (4th)	In the Name of the Son	Au nom du fils	Philippe Charbonnel, Guilhem Donzel, and Matthieu Michaux
2013 (4th)	Tango libre		Marc Bastien and Thomas Gauder
2014 (5th)	Not My Type	Pas son genre	Henri Morelle and Luc Thomas
2014 (5th)	The Strange Color of Your Body's Tears	L'Étrange Couleur des larmes de ton corps	Dan Bruylandt, Mathieu Cox, and Olivier Thys
2014 (5th)	Two Days, One Night	Deux jours, une nuit	Benoît De Clerck and Thomas Gauder
2015 (6th)	Alleluia		Emmanuel de Boissieu, Frédéric Meert, and Ludovic Van Pachterbeke
2015 (6th)	The Brand New Testament	Le Tout Nouveau Testament	François Dumont, Michel Schillings, and Dominique Warnier
2015 (6th)	I'm Dead but I Have Friends	Je suis mort mais j'ai des amis	Marc Bastien, Marc Engels, and Franco Piscopo
2016 (7th)	The Red Turtle	La Tortue rouge	Nils Fauth and Peter Soldan
2016 (7th)	Death by Death	Je me tue à le dire	Arnaud Calvar, Julien Mizac, and Philippe Charbonnel
2016 (7th)	Keeper		Virginie Messiaen and Franco Piscopo
2017 (8th)	Insyriated		Paul Heymans and Alek Gosse
2017 (8th)	A Wedding	Noces	Olivier Ronval and Michel Schillings
2017 (8th)	Sonar		Félix Blume, Benoît Biral and Frédéric Meert
2018 (9th)	Let the Corpses Tan	Laissez bronzer les cadavres	Yves Bemelmans, Dan Bruylandt, Olivier Thys, Benoit Biral
2018 (9th)	Above the Law	Tueurs	Marc Engels, Thomas Gauder, Ingrid Simon
2018 (9th)	Girl		Yanna Soentjens
2019 (10th)	Mothers' Instinct	Duelles	Olivier Struye, Marc Bastien, Héléna Réveillère, Thomas Gauder
2019 (10th)	Atlantics	Atlantique	Benoît De Clerck, Emmanuel de Boissieu, Claude Gillet
2019 (10th)	Our Mothers	Nuestras madres	Emmanuel de Boissieu and Vincent Nouaille

=== 2020s ===
Year	English title	Original title	Sound mixers
2020/21 (11th)	Playground	Un monde	Mathieu Cox, Corinne Dubien, Thomas Grimm-Landsberg, and David Vranken
2020/21 (11th)	Madly in Life	Une vie démente	Bruno Schweisguth, Julien Mizac, Philippe Charbonnel
2020/21 (11th)	Titane		Séverin Favriau, Fabrice Osinski, Stéphane Thiébaut
2022 (12th)	Animals		François Aubinet, Mathieu Cox, Pierre Mertens, David Vranken and Philippe Van Leer
2022 (12th)	The Night of the 12th	La Nuit du 12	François Maurel, Olivier Mortier and Luc Thomas
2022 (12th)	Nobody Has to Know		Marc Bastien, Thomas Gauder, Etienne Carton, Cameron Mercer and Philippe Van Leer
2023 (13th)	Love According to Dalva	Dalva	Fabrice Osinski, Valérie Le Docte, Aline Gavroy and Olivier Thys
2023 (13th)	Omen	Augure	Jan Deca, Erik Griekspoor, Danny van Spreuwel and Vincent Nouaille
2023 (13th)	Vincent Must Die	Vincent doit mourir	Dirk Bombey, Emilie Mauguet, Xavier Thieulin and Bertrand Boudaud
2024 (14th)	Night Call	La nuit se traîne	David Vranken, David Gillain, Joey Van Impe, Thibaud Rie, Fabrice Grizard, Antoine Wattier and Vincent Gregorio
2024 (14th)	A Missing Part	Une part manquante	Nicolas Paturle, Virginie Messiaen, Franco Piscopo and Olivier Thys
2024 (14th)	Life's a Bitch	Chiennes de vie	Marie Paulus, Valérie Le Docte and Philippe Charbonnel
2025 (15th)	Flow	Straume	Philippe Charbonnel, Bertrand Boudaud and Gurwal Coïc-Gallas
2025 (15th)	Maldoror		Dirk Bombey, Julie Brenta, Emmanuel de Boissieu, and Bertrand Boudaud
2025 (15th)	Reflection in a Dead Diamond	Reflet dans un diamant mort	Dan Bruylandt, Olivier Thys, Mathieu Cox, and Aline Gavroy
