= Magritte Award for Best Original Score =

Belgian film award

- Presented by: Académie André Delvaux
- First award: 2011
- Currently held by: Vincent Cahay, Maldoror (2025)
- Website: lesmagritteducinema.com

The Magritte Award for Best Original Score (French: Magritte de la meilleure musique originale) is an award presented annually by the Académie André Delvaux. It is one of the Magritte Awards, which were established to recognize excellence in Belgian cinematic achievements.

The 1st Magritte Awards ceremony was held in 2011 with Pierre Van Dormael receiving posthumously the award for his work in Mr. Nobody. As of the 2026 ceremony, Vincent Cahay is the most recent winner in this category for his work in Maldoror.

== Winners and nominees ==
In the list below, winners are listed first in the colored row, followed by the other nominees.

=== 2010s ===
Year	Composer(s)	English title	Original title
2010 (1st)	Pierre Van Dormael	Mr. Nobody	
2010 (1st)	Bernard Plouvier	A Town Called Panic	Panique au village
2010 (1st)	Frédéric Vercheval	Diamant 13	
2011 (2nd)	Bram Van Parys	The Giants	Les Géants
2011 (2nd)	Raf Keunen	Bullhead	Rundskop
2011 (2nd)	Frédéric Vercheval	Trader Games	Krach
2012 (3rd)	Coyote, Renaud Mayeur, François Petit, Michaël de Zanet	Mobile Home	
2012 (3rd)	DAAU	Last Winter	L'Hiver dernier
2012 (3rd)	Arne Van Dongen	One Night	38 témoins
2013 (4th)	Ozark Henry	The World Belongs to Us	Le Monde nous appartient
2013 (4th)	Michelino Bisceglia	In the Name of the Son	Au nom du fils
2013 (4th)	Christophe Vervoort	The Bag of Flour	Le Sac de farine
2014 (5th)	Soldout	Puppylove	
2014 (5th)	Frédéric Vercheval	Not My Type	Pas son genre
2014 (5th)	Wim Willaert	Henri	
2015 (6th)	An Pierlé	The Brand New Testament	Le Tout Nouveau Testament
2015 (6th)	Vincent Cahay	Alleluia	
2015 (6th)	Frédéric Vercheval	Melody	
2016 (7th)	Cyrille de Haes and Manuel Roland	Parasol	
2016 (7th)	Hannes De Maeyer	Black	
2016 (7th)	Catherine Graindorge	Rising Voices	Le Chant des hommes
2017 (8th)	Jean-Luc Fafchamps	Insyriated	
2017 (8th)	Raf Keunen	Racer and the Jailbird	Le Fidèle
2017 (8th)	Frédéric Vercheval	This Is Our Land	Chez nous
2018 (9th)	Simon Fransquet	When Arabs Danced	
2018 (9th)	Vincent Liben	The Benefit of the Doubt	Une Part d'ombre
2018 (9th)	Manuel Roland and Maarten Van Cauwenberghe	The Faithful Son	La Part sauvage
2019 (10th)	Frédéric Vercheval	Mothers' Instinct	Duelles
2019 (10th)	Raf Keunen	Lola	Lola vers la mer
2019 (10th)	Dan Klein	Girls on the Run	Cavale
2019 (10th)	Fabien Leclercq	Binti	

=== 2020s ===
Year	Composer(s)	English title	Original title
2020/21 (11th)	Vincent Cahay	Adoration	
2020/21 (11th)	Loup Mormont	My Voice Will Be with You	Ma voix t'accompagnera
2020/21 (11th)	DAAN	Rookie	
2022 (12th)	Hannes De Maeyer, Oum, Aboubakr Bensaihi	Rebel	
2022 (12th)	Fabian Fiorini	The Hive	La Ruche
2022 (12th)	Vincent Cahay	Inexorable	
2023 (13th)	Baloji	Omen	Augure
2023 (13th)	Stéphanie Blanchoud, Benjamin Biolay and Jean-François Assy	The Line	La Ligne
2023 (13th)	Thomas Turine	The Other Laurens	L'Autre Laurens
2024 (14th)	Frédéric Vercheval	Green Border	Zielona granica
2024 (14th)	Charles de Ville and Nelly Tungang	Savages	Sauvages
2024 (14th)	Casimir Liberski	The Art of Nothing	L'Art d'être heureux
2025 (15th)	Vincent Cahay	Maldoror	
2025 (15th)	Frédéric Vercheval	Haunted Minds	
2025 (15th)	Wim De Wilde	Radioman	

== See also ==
- List of film music awards § Best score
