= Magritte Award for Best Actress =

Belgian film award

- Presented by: Académie André Delvaux
- First award: 2011
- Currently held by: Lubna Azabal, The Blue Caftan (2023)
- Website: lesmagritteducinema.com

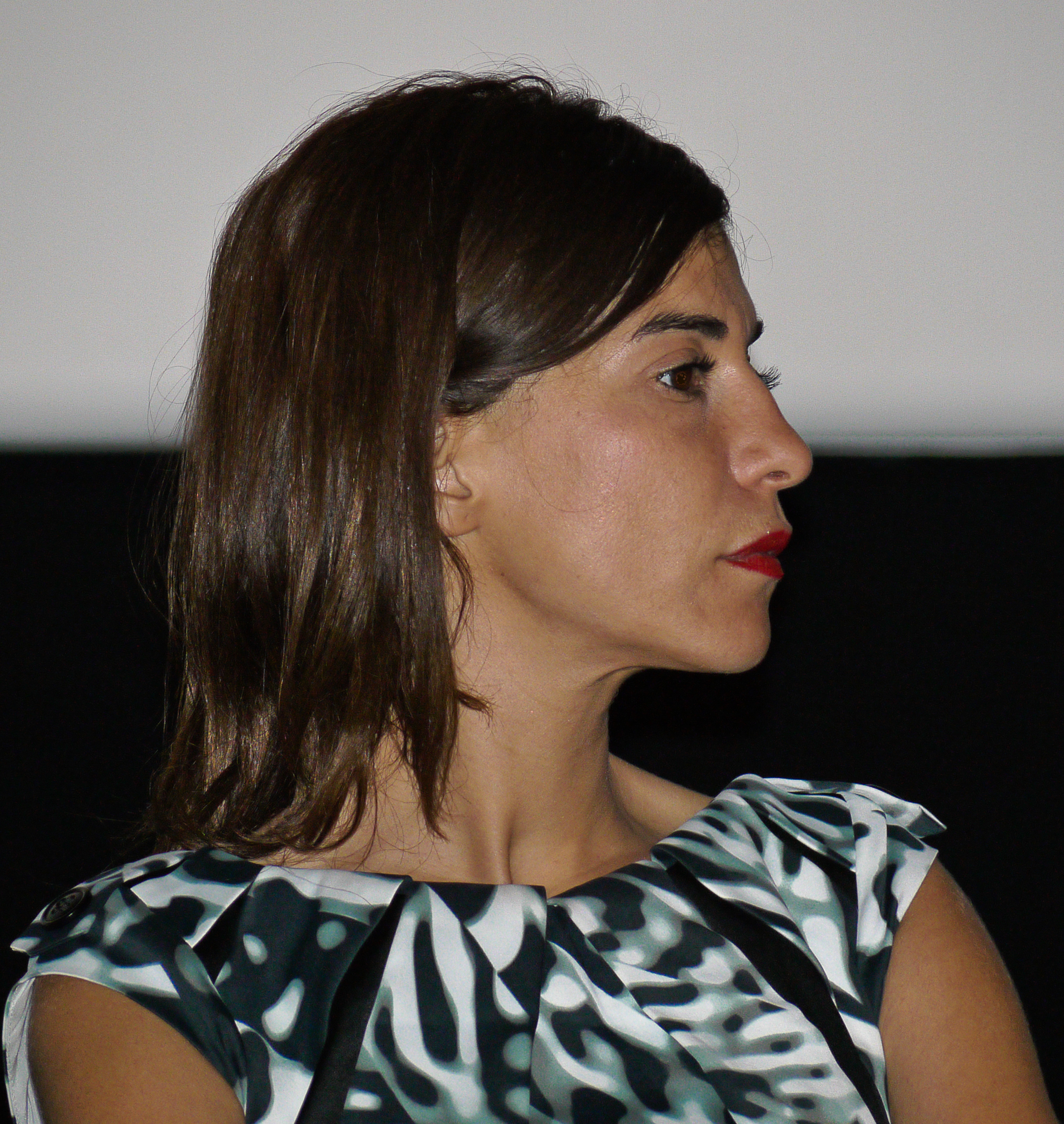
Loubna Azabal at the premiere of the film Free Men by Ismaël Ferroukhi - Paris Cinema

The Magritte Award for Best Actress (French: Magritte de la meilleure actrice) is an award presented annually by the Académie André Delvaux. It is given in honor of an actress who has delivered an outstanding performance in a leading role while working within the film industry. It is one of the Magritte Awards, which were established to recognize excellence in Belgian cinematic achievements.

The 1st Magritte Awards ceremony was held in 2011 with Anne Coesens receiving the award for her role in Illegal. As of the 2022 ceremony, Jo Deseure is the most recent winner in this category for her role in Madly in Life.

== Winners and nominees ==
In the list below, winners are listed first in the colored row, followed by the other nominees.

=== Superlatives ===
Superlative	Best Actress		Best Supporting Actress		Overall (including Most Promising Actress)						
Actress with most awards	Lubna Azabal	4	Catherine Salée	2	Émilie Dequenne	Lubna Azabal	4				
Actress with most awards	Lubna Azabal	4	Catherine Salée	2	Actress with most nominations	Lubna Azabal	6	Yolande Moreau	5	Yolande Moreau	9
Actress with most nominations without ever winning	Cécile de France	5	Claire Bodson	3	Cécile de France	5					
Oldest winner	Jo Deseure	74	Yolande Moreau	58	Jo Deseure	74					
Oldest nominee	Annie Cordy	86	Julienne Goeffers	75	Annie Cordy	86					
Youngest winner	Pauline Étienne	25	Aurora Marion	32	Pauline Étienne	25					

=== 2010s ===
Year	Actress	English title	Original title
2010 (1st)	Anne Coesens	Illegal	Illégal
2010 (1st)	Cécile de France	Sister Smile	Soeur Sourire
2010 (1st)	Yolande Moreau	Mammuth	
2010 (1st)	Aylin Yay	Motherly	Maternelle
2011 (2nd)	Lubna Azabal	Incendies	
2011 (2nd)	Cécile de France	The Kid with a Bike	Le Gamin au vélo
2011 (2nd)	Isabelle de Hertogh	Come as You Are	Hasta la Vista
2011 (2nd)	Yolande Moreau	The Long Falling	Où va la nuit
2012 (3rd)	Émilie Dequenne	Our Children	À perdre la raison
2012 (3rd)	Christelle Cornil	Miles from Anywhere	Au cul du loup
2012 (3rd)	Déborah François	A Checkout Girl's Big Adventures	Les Tribulations d'une caissière
2012 (3rd)	Marie Gillain	All Our Desires	Toutes nos envies
2013 (4th)	Pauline Étienne	The Nun	La Religieuse
2013 (4th)	Lubna Azabal	Goodbye Morocco	
2013 (4th)	Déborah François	Populaire	
2013 (4th)	Astrid Whettnall	In the Name of the Son	Au nom du fils
2014 (5th)	Émilie Dequenne	Not My Type	Pas son genre
2014 (5th)	Manah Depauw	Welcome Home	
2014 (5th)	Pauline Étienne	Tokyo Fiancée	
2014 (5th)	Déborah François	Maestro	
2014 (5th)	Ben Riga	I'll Bury You	Je te survivrai
2015 (6th)	Veerle Baetens	Un début prometteur	
2015 (6th)	Annie Cordy	Memories	Les Souvenirs
2015 (6th)	Christelle Cornil	What Jacques Saw	Jacques a vu
2015 (6th)	Yolande Moreau	Journey Through China	Voyage en Chine
2016 (7th)	Virginie Efira	In Bed with Victoria	Victoria
2016 (7th)	Astrid Whettnall	Road to Istanbul	La Route d'Istanbul
2016 (7th)	Jo Deseure	Man Overboard	Un homme à la mer
2016 (7th)	Marie Gillain	Mirage of Love	Mirage d'amour
2017 (8th)	Émilie Dequenne	This Is Our Land	Chez nous
2017 (8th)	Cécile de France	Just to Be Sure	Ôtez-moi d'un Doute
2017 (8th)	Lucie Debay	King of the Belgians	
2017 (8th)	Fiona Gordon	Lost in Paris	Paris pieds nus
2018 (9th)	Lubna Azabal	Above the Law	Tueurs
2018 (9th)	Cécile de France	Mademoiselle de Joncquières	
2018 (9th)	Yolande Moreau	I Feel Good	
2018 (9th)	Natacha Régnier	The Benefit of the Doubt	Une Part d'ombre
2019 (10th)	Veerle Baetens	Mothers' Instinct	Duelles
2019 (10th)	Lubna Azabal	Tel Aviv on Fire	
2019 (10th)	Anne Coesens	Mothers' Instinct	Duelles
2019 (10th)	Cécile de France	A Bigger World	Un monde plus grand

=== 2020s ===
Year	Actress	English title	Original title
2020/21 (11th)	Jo Deseure	Madly in Life	Une vie démente
2020/21 (11th)	Lubna Azabal	Adam	
2020/21 (11th)	Lucie Debay	Madly in Life	Une vie démente
2020/21 (11th)	Virginie Efira	Bye Bye Morons	Adieu les cons
2022 (12th)	Virginie Efira	Paris Memories	Revoir Paris
2022 (12th)	Lubna Azabal	Rebel	
2022 (12th)	Lucie Debay	Lucie Loses Her Horse	Lucie perd son cheval
2022 (12th)	Babetida Sadjo	Juwaa	
2023 (13th)	Lubna Azabal	The Blue Caftan	Le Bleu du caftan
2023 (13th)	Lucie Debay	The Experience of Love	Le Syndrome des amours passées
2023 (13th)	Yolande Moreau	La Fiancée du poète	
2023 (13th)	Mara Taquin	La Petite	
2024 (14th)	Lubna Azabal	Amal	
2024 (14th)	Selma Alaoui	Through the Night	Quitter la nuit
2024 (14th)	Veerle Baetens	Through the Night	Quitter la nuit
2024 (14th)	Emilie Dequenne	TKT	
