= Magritte Award for Best Foreign Film in Coproduction =

Belgian film award

- Country: Belgium
- Presented by: Académie André Delvaux
- First award: 2012
- Currently held by: Flow (2025)
- Website: lesmagritteducinema.com

The Magritte Award for Best Foreign Film in Coproduction (French: Magritte du meilleur film étranger en coproduction) is an award presented annually by the Académie André Delvaux. It is one of the Magritte Awards, which were established to recognize excellence in Belgian cinematic achievements.

It was first awarded in 2012, when Best Film in Coproduction was split in Best Foreign Film in Coproduction and Best Flemish Film in Coproduction. As of the 2026 ceremony, Flow is the most recent winner in this category.

== Winners and nominees ==
In the list below, winners are listed first in the colored row, followed by the other nominees.

=== 2010s ===
Year	English title	Original title	Production company(s)
2011 (2nd)	Romantics Anonymous	Les Émotifs anonymes	Climax Films (Olivier Rausin)
2011 (2nd)	Potiche		Mandarin Cinéma
2011 (2nd)	Route Irish		Sixteen Films
2011 (2nd)	A Screaming Man	Un homme qui crie	Pili Films
2012 (3rd)	The Minister	L'Exercice de l'État	Les Films du Fleuve
2012 (3rd)	The Angels' Share		Sixteen Films
2012 (3rd)	Rust and Bone	De rouille et d'os	Why Not Productions
2012 (3rd)	When Pigs Have Wings	Le Cochon de Gaza	Saga Film
2013 (4th)	Blue Is the Warmest Colour	La Vie d'Adèle – Chapitres 1 & 2	Scope Pictures (Geneviève Lemal)
2013 (4th)	Horses of God	Les Chevaux de Dieu	YC Aligator Film
2013 (4th)	The Nun	La Religieuse	Versus Production
2013 (4th)	Populaire		Panache Productions
2014 (5th)	Minuscule: Valley of the Lost Ants	Minuscule - La vallée des fourmis perdues	Les Films du Fleuve
2014 (5th)	Playing Dead	Je fais le mort	Entre Chien et Loup
2014 (5th)	A Promise		Scope Pictures
2014 (5th)	Violette		Climax Films
2015 (6th)	La Famille Bélier		Nexus Factory
2015 (6th)	Marguerite		Scope Pictures
2015 (6th)	Song of the Sea		The Big Farm
2015 (6th)	The Wakhan Front	Ni le ciel ni la terre	Tarantula
2016 (7th)	The Red Turtle	La Tortue rouge	Belvision
2016 (7th)	As I Open My Eyes	À peine j'ouvre les yeux	Hélicotronc
2016 (7th)	Eternity	Éternité	Artémis Productions
2016 (7th)	Les Cowboys		Les Films du Fleuve
2017 (8th)	Raw	Grave	Frakas Productions (Jean-Yves Roubin)
2017 (8th)	Graduation	Bacalaureat	Les Films du Fleuve
2017 (8th)	I, Daniel Blake		Les Films du Fleuve
2017 (8th)	Loveless	Nelyubov	Les Films du Fleuve
2018 (9th)	The Man Who Killed Don Quixote		Entre Chien et Loup (Sébastien Delloye)
2018 (9th)	The Death of Stalin		La Compagnie Cinématographique and Panache Productions
2018 (9th)	The Happy Prince		Entre Chien et Loup
2018 (9th)	Nico, 1988		Tarantula
2019 (10th)	Sorry We Missed You		
2019 (10th)	Atlantics	Atlantique	
2019 (10th)	The Sisters Brothers		
2019 (10th)	Tel Aviv on Fire		
2020 (11th)	Sorry We Missed You		
2020 (11th)	Atlantics	Atlantique	
2020 (11th)	The Sisters Brothers		
2020 (11th)	Tel Aviv on Fire		

=== 2020s ===
Year	English title	Original title	Director(s)
2020/21 (11th)	Titane		Julia Ducournau
2020/21 (11th)	Adam		Maryam Touzani
2020/21 (11th)	The Man Who Sold His Skin		Kaouther Ben Hania
2020/21 (11th)	Onoda: 10,000 Nights in the Jungle	Onoda, 10 000 nuits dans la jungle	Arthur Harari
2022 (12th)	The Night of the 12th	La Nuit du 12	Dominik Moll
2022 (12th)	Clara Sola		Nathalie Álvarez Mesén
2022 (12th)	Madeleine Collins		Antoine Barraud
2022 (12th)	Singing Jailbirds	À l'ombre des filles	Étienne Comar
2022 (12th)	Where Is Anne Frank		Ari Folman
2023 (13th)	Vincent Must Die	Vincent doit mourir	Stéphan Castang
2023 (13th)	The Blue Caftan	Le Bleu du caftan	Maryam Touzani
2023 (13th)	No Dogs or Italians Allowed	Interdit aux chiens et aux italiens	Alain Ughetto
2023 (13th)	Return to Seoul	Retour à Séoul	Davy Chou
2024 (14th)	The Most Precious of Cargoes	La Plus Précieuse des marchandises	Michel Hazanavicius
2024 (14th)	Animale		Emma Benestan
2024 (14th)	Io capitano		Matteo Garrone
2024 (14th)	Savages	Sauvages	Claude Barras
2025 (15th)	Flow	Straume	Gints Zilbalodis
2025 (15th)	Alpha		Julia Ducournau
2025 (15th)	Muganga		Marie-Hélène Roux
2025 (15th)	Vermiglio		Maura Delpero
