= Magritte Award for Most Promising Actor =

Belgian film award

- Presented by: Académie André Delvaux
- First award: 2011
- Currently held by: Maxi Delmelle, Heads or Fails (2025)
- Website: lesmagritteducinema.com

The Magritte Award for Most Promising Actor (French: Magritte du meilleur espoir masculin) is an award presented annually by the Académie André Delvaux. It is given in honor of a young actor who has delivered an outstanding breakthrough performance while working within the film industry. It is one of the Magritte Awards, which were established to recognize excellence in Belgian cinematic achievements.

The 1st Magritte Awards ceremony was held in 2011 with Joffrey Verbruggen receiving the award for his role in The Boat Race. As of the 2022 ceremony, Günter Duret is the most recent winner in this category for his role in Playground.

== Winners and nominees ==
In the list below, winners are listed first in the colored row, followed by the other nominees.

=== 2010s ===
Year	Actor	English title	Original title
2010 (1st)	Joffrey Verbruggen	The Boat Race	La Régate
2010 (1st)	Jonas Bloquet	Private Lessons	Élève libre
2010 (1st)	Amir Ben Abdelmoumen	Oscar and the Lady in Pink	Oscar et la Dame rose
2010 (1st)	Martin Nissen	Angel at Sea	Un ange à la mer
2011 (2nd)	Thomas Doret	The Kid with a Bike	Le Gamin au vélo
2011 (2nd)	Romain David	Black Ocean	Noir océan
2011 (2nd)	David Murgia	Bullhead	Rundskop
2011 (2nd)	Martin Nissen	The Giants	Les Géants
2012 (3rd)	David Murgia	Headfirst	La Tête la première
2012 (3rd)	Cédric Constantin	Torpedo	
2012 (3rd)	Gael Maleux	Mobile Home	
2012 (3rd)	Martin Swabey	Little Glory	
2013 (4th)	Achille Ridolfi	In the Name of the Son	Au nom du fils
2013 (4th)	Mehdi Dehbi	The Bag of Flour	Le Sac de farine
2013 (4th)	Steve Driesen	Landes	
2013 (4th)	Bent Simons	Kid	
2014 (5th)	Marc Zinga	Scouting for Zebras	Les Rayures du zèbre
2014 (5th)	Corentin Lobet	Playing Dead	Je fais le mort
2014 (5th)	Benjamin Ramon	Tokyo Anyway	
2014 (5th)	Matteo Simoni	Marina	
2015 (6th)	Benjamin Ramon	Être	
2015 (6th)	Arthur Bols	Prejudice	
2015 (6th)	Romain Gelin	The Brand New Testament	Le Tout Nouveau Testament
2015 (6th)	David Thielemans	Chubby	Bouboule
2016 (7th)	Yoann Blanc	Man Overboard	Un homme à la mer
2016 (7th)	Lazare Gousseau	Baden Baden	
2016 (7th)	Martin Nissen	Welcome Home	
2016 (7th)	Pierre Olivier	Nous quatre	
2017 (8th)	Soufiane Chilah	Blind Spot	Dode Hoek
2017 (8th)	Mistral Guidotti	Home	
2017 (8th)	Baptiste Sornin	Sonar	
2017 (8th)	Arieh Worthalter	Past Imperfect	Le Passé devant nous
2018 (9th)	Thomas Mustin	The Royal Exchange	L'Échange des princesses
2018 (9th)	Basile Grunberger	Our Struggles	Nos batailles
2018 (9th)	Baptiste Lalieu	The Benefit of the Doubt	Une Part d'ombre
2018 (9th)	Matteo Salamone	Mon Ket	
2019 (10th)	Idir Ben Addi	Young Ahmed	Le Jeune Ahmed
2019 (10th)	Baloji	Binti	
2019 (10th)	François Neycken	Escapada	
2019 (10th)	Jeremy Senez	Three Days and a Life	Trois jours et une vie

=== 2020s ===
Year	Actor	English title	Original title
2020/21 (11th)	Günter Duret	Playground	Un monde
2020/21 (11th)	Roméo Elvis	Mandibles	Mandibules
2020/21 (11th)	Basile Grunberger	SpaceBoy	
2020/21 (11th)	Yoann Zimmer	Home Front	Des hommes
2022 (12th)	Eden Dambrine	Close	
2022 (12th)	Gianni Guettaf	Animals	
2022 (12th)	Gustav De Waele	Close	
2022 (12th)	Pablo Schils	Tori and Lokita	Tori and Lokita
2023 (13th)	Lazare Gousseau	The Experience of Love	Le Syndrome des amours passées
2023 (13th)	Amine Hamidou	The Lost Boys	Le Paradis
2023 (13th)	N'Landu Lubansu	The Lost Boys	Le Paradis
2023 (13th)	Yoann Zimmer	Return to Seoul	Retour à Séoul
2024 (14th)	Makenzy Lombet	It's Raining in the House	Il pleut dans la maison
2024 (14th)	Amine Hamidou	Amal	
2024 (14th)	Mehdi Khachachi	Amal	
2024 (14th)	Lou Goossens	Young Hearts	
2025 (15th)	Maxi Delmelle	Heads or Fails	Aimer perdre
2025 (15th)	Jules Delsart	Adam's Interest	L'intérêt d'Adam
2025 (15th)	Ulysse Goffin	We Believe You	On vous croit
2025 (15th)	Jef Jacobs	Young Mothers	Jeunes mères
