= 3rd Magritte Awards =

2013 Belgian film awards ceremony

- Official poster
- Date: February 2, 2013
- Site: Square; Mont des Arts, Brussels, Belgium
- Hosted by: Fabrizio Rongione
- Produced by: José Bouquiaux
- Directed by: Vincent J. Gustin

Highlights
- Best Film: Our Children
- Most awards: Our Children (4)
- Most nominations: Dead Man Talking (8)

Television coverage
- Network: BeTV

The 3rd Magritte Awards ceremony, presented by the Académie André Delvaux, honored the best films of 2012 in Belgium and took place on February 2, 2013, at the Square in the historic site of Mont des Arts, Brussels beginning at 8:00 p.m. CET. During the ceremony, the Académie André Delvaux presented Magritte Awards in 20 categories. The ceremony was televised in Belgium by BeTV. Actress Yolande Moreau presided the ceremony, while actor Fabrizio Rongione hosted the show for the first time.

The nominees for the 3rd Magritte Awards were announced on January 10, 2013. Films receiving the most nominations were Dead Man Talking with eight, followed by Our Children, Mobile Home and One Night with seven. The winners were announced during the awards ceremony on February 2, 2013. Our Children won four awards, including Best Film and Best Director for Joachim Lafosse. Other multiple winners were The Minister with three awards, and Mobile Home with two.

== Winners and nominees ==
=== Best Film ===
- Our Children (À perdre la raison)
  - Dead Man Talking
  - Mobile Home
  - One Night (38 témoins)

=== Best Director ===
- Joachim Lafosse – Our Children (À perdre la raison)
  - Lucas Belvaux – One Night (38 témoins)
  - François Pirot – Mobile Home
  - Patrick Ridremont – Dead Man Talking

=== Best Flemish Film in Coproduction ===
- Time of My Life (Tot altijd)
  - Little Black Spiders
  - Madonna's Pig (Het varken van Madonna)

=== Best Foreign Film in Coproduction ===
- The Minister (L'Exercice de l'État)
  - The Angels' Share
  - Rust and Bone (De rouille et d'os)
  - When Pigs Have Wings (Le Cochon de Gaza)

=== Best Screenplay ===
- One Night (38 témoins) – Lucas Belvaux
  - Dead Man Talking – Patrick Ridremont and Jean-Sébastien Lopez
  - Mobile Home – François Pirot, Maarten Loix, and Jean-Benoît Ugeux
  - Our Children (À perdre la raison) – Joachim Lafosse and Matthieu Reynaert

=== Best Actor ===
- Olivier Gourmet – The Minister (L'Exercice de l'État)
  - Benoît Poelvoorde – Le grand soir
  - Jérémie Renier – My Way (Cloclo)
  - Matthias Schoenaerts – Rust and Bone (De rouille et d'os)

=== Best Actress ===
- Émilie Dequenne – Our Children (À perdre la raison)
  - Christelle Cornil – Miles from Anywhere (Au cul du loup)
  - Déborah François – A Checkout Girl's Big Adventures (Les Tribulations d'une caissière)
  - Marie Gillain – All Our Desires (Toutes nos envies)

=== Best Supporting Actor ===
- Bouli Lanners – Rust and Bone (De rouille et d'os)
  - Jean-Luc Couchard – Dead Man Talking
  - Dieudonné Kabongo – The Invader (L'envahisseur)
  - Denis M'Punga – Dead Man Talking

=== Best Supporting Actress ===
- Yolande Moreau – Camille Rewinds (Camille redouble)
  - Stéphane Bissot – Our Children (À perdre la raison)
  - Natacha Régnier – One Night (38 témoins)
  - Catherine Salée – Mobile Home

=== Most Promising Actor ===
- David Murgia – Headfirst (La Tête la première)
  - Cédric Constantin – Torpedo
  - Gael Maleux – Mobile Home
  - Martin Swabey – Little Glory

=== Most Promising Actress ===
- Anne-Pascale Clairembourg – Mobile Home
  - Pauline Burlet – Dead Man Talking
  - Mona Jabé – Miss Mouche
  - Aurora Marion – Almayer's Folly (La Folie Almayer)

=== Best Cinematography ===
- Last Winter (L'Hiver dernier) – Hichame Alaouie
  - Almayer's Folly (La Folie Almayer) – Remon Fromont
  - Dead Man Talking – Danny Elsen

=== Best Sound ===
- The Minister (L'Exercice de l'État) – Julie Brenta and Olivier Hespel
  - One Night (38 témoins) – Henri Morelle, Luc Thomas, and Aline Gavroy
  - Our Children (À perdre la raison) – Ingrid Simon and Thomas Gauder

=== Best Production Design ===
- Dead Man Talking – Alina Santos
  - The Invader (L'envahisseur) – Françoise Joset
  - Almayer's Folly (La Folie Almayer) – Patrick Dechesne and Alain-Pascal Housiaux

=== Best Costume Design ===
- Le grand soir – Florence Laforge
  - The Minister (L'Exercice de l'État) – Pascaline Chavanne
  - Almayer's Folly (La Folie Almayer) – Catherine Marchand

=== Best Original Score ===
- Mobile Home – Coyote, Renaud Mayeur, François Petit, and Michaël de Zanet
  - Last Winter (L'Hiver dernier) – DAAU
  - One Night (38 témoins) – Arne Van Dongen

=== Best Editing ===
- Our Children (À perdre la raison) – Sophie Vercruysse
  - Approved for Adoption (Couleur de peau: miel) – Ewin Ryckaert
  - One Night (38 témoins) – Ludo Troch
  - When Pigs Have Wings (Le Cochon de Gaza) – Damien Keyeux

=== Best Short Film ===
- The Lobster's Cry (Le cri du homard)
  - Domestic Tale (Fable domestique)
  - A New Old Story
  - U.H.T.

=== Best Documentary ===
- Tea or Electricity (Le thé ou l'électricité)
  - The Chebeya Case (L'affaire Chebeya, un crime d'Etat?)
  - Cinéma Inch'Allah!
  - Greetings from the Colony (Bons baisers de la colonie)

=== Honorary Magritte Award ===
- Costa-Gavras

== Films with multiple nominations and awards ==
The following eleven films received multiple nominations.

- Eight: Dead Man Talking
- Seven: Mobile Home, One Night, and Our Children
- Four: Almayer's Folly and The Minister
- Three: Rust and Bone
- Two: The Invader, Last Winter, Le grand soir, and When Pigs Have Wings

The following three films received multiple awards.

- Four: Our Children
- Three: The Minister
- Two: Mobile Home

== See also ==
- 38th César Awards
- 18th Lumières Awards
- 2012 in film
