= The Art of Nothing =

2024 film directed by Stefan Liberski

- Film poster
- French: L'Art d'être heureux
- Directed by: Stefan Liberski
- Written by: Stefan Liberski
- Based on: La Dilution de l'artiste by Jean-Philippe Delhomme
- Produced by: Jean-Yves Roubin; Cassandre Warnauts
- Cinematography: Hichame Alaouié
- Edited by: Frédérique Broos
- Music by: Casimir Liberski
- Release date: 17 October 2024 (Rome)
- Running time: 110 minutes
- Countries: Belgium; France
- Language: French

The Art of Nothing (French: L'Art d'être heureux) is a 2024 comedy film written and directed by Stefan Liberski. The film had its world premiere at the 19th Rome Film Festival on 17 October 2024. At the 14th Magritte Awards, The Art of Nothing was nominated in the categories of Best Actor (Poelvoorde) and Best Original Score (Casimir Liberski).

== Synopsis ==
The story is based on the 2001 novel La dilution de l’artiste by Jean-Philippe Delhomme. The film stars Benoît Poelvoorde as an unknown and disillusioned painter who decides to quit his job and move to a small town in Normandy, hoping to create a masterpiece.

== Cast ==
- Benoît Poelvoorde as Yves Machond
- Camille Cottin as Cécile Fouasse-Demaupré
- François Damiens as Claude Fouasse
- Gustave Kervern as Bagnoule
- Lorella Cravotta as Macha Moniak
