= Paloma Sermon-Daï =

Belgian film director and screenwriter

- Born: Namur, Belgium
- Education: Haute École de Bruxelles
- Occupations: Film director; Screenwriter
- Years active: 2016–present

Paloma Sermon-Daï is a Belgian film director and screenwriter. Her work explores themes of family, vulnerability, and social hardship through a blend of realism and poetic visual storytelling.

== Early life and education ==
Sermon-Daï was born in Namur, Belgium.

She graduated in cinematography from the Haute École libre de Bruxelles. During her studies, she directed Makenzy (2017), a short film that premiered at Visions du Réel.

== Career ==
Sermon-Daï directed the documentary film Petit Samedi in 2020. The film, which explores themes of addiction and family relationships, premiered at the Berlinale International Forum of New Cinema and went on to win several awards, including the Magritte Award for Best Documentary Film and the Golden Bayard at the Namur Film Festival.

Sermon-Daï made her narrative feature debut with the coming-of-age drama from It's Raining in the House (2023). An international co-production between Belgium and France, the film follows two adolescent siblings navigating a summer on their own while grappling with economic hardship and personal challenges. The film premiered at the 2023 Cannes Film Festival during Critics' Week, where it competed for the Camera d'Or. Critics praised Sermon-Daï's ability to combine realism with a poetic visual style, as well as the emotional depth of the sibling relationship portrayed in the film.

At the 14th Magritte Awards, It's Raining in the House earned eight nominations, including Best Film and Best Director for Sermon-Daï.
