= The Benefit of the Doubt =

- Film poster
- French: Une Part d'ombre
- Directed by: Samuel Tilman
- Written by: Samuel Tilman
- Produced by: Marie Besson
- Starring: Fabrizio Rongione; Natacha Régnier; Baptiste Lalieu
- Release dates: 3 October 2017 (Namur); 7 March 2018
- Running time: 90 minutes
- Countries: Belgium; France; Switzerland
- Language: French

The Benefit of the Doubt (French: Une Part d'ombre) is a 2017 Belgian thriller film directed and written by Samuel Tilman in his directorial debut. The film had its world premiere at the Festival International du Film Francophone de Namur on 3 October 2017. It received seven nominations at the 9th Magritte Awards, including Best First Feature Film and Best Actress for Natacha Régnier.

== Cast ==
- Fabrizio Rongione as David Giraud
- Natacha Régnier as Julie
- Baptiste Lalieu as Noël
- Myriem Akheddiou as Cathy
- Christophe Paou as Marco
- Yoann Blanc as Fabian
- Steve Driesen as Simon
- Erika Sainte as Maud
- Naïma Ostrowski as Jeanne
- Gilles Remiche as Vendeur

== Accolades ==
| Award / Film Festival | Category | Recipients and nominees | Result |
|---|---|---|---|
| Beaune International Film Festival | Special Jury Prize | | Won |
| Magritte Awards | Best First Feature Film | | Nominated |
| Magritte Awards | Best Actress | Natacha Régnier | Nominated |
| Magritte Awards | Best Supporting Actor | Yoann Blanc | Nominated |
| Magritte Awards | Best Supporting Actress | Erika Sainte | Nominated |
| Magritte Awards | Most Promising Actor | Baptiste Lalieu | Nominated |
| Magritte Awards | Most Promising Actress | Myriem Akheddiou | Nominated |
| Magritte Awards | Best Original Score | Vincent Liben | Nominated |
