= Escapada =

- Film poster
- Directed by: Sarah Hirtt
- Written by: Sarah Hirtt
- Produced by: Patrick Quinet; Claude Waringo
- Edited by: Emilie Morier
- Release dates: 1 October 2018 (Namur); 13 March 2019 (Belgium)
- Running time: 89 minutes
- Countries: Belgium; Spain; Luxembourg
- Languages: Spanish; French

Escapada is a 2018 comedy-drama film written and directed by Sarah Hirtt. It is an international coproduction between Belgium, Spain and Luxembourg featuring an ensemble cast of newcomers. The film had its world premiere at the 2018 Namur Film Festival.

At the 10th Magritte Awards, Escapada received three nominations in the categories of Best First Feature Film, Most Promising Actor for François Neycken and Most Promising Actress for Raphaëlle Corbisier.

== Accolades ==
Award / Film Festival	Category	Recipients and nominees	Result
Magritte Award	Best First Feature Film		Nominated
Magritte Award	Most Promising Actor	François Neycken	Nominated
Magritte Award	Most Promising Actress	Raphaëlle Corbisier	Nominated
Namur Film Festival	Best First Feature Film		Nominated
Quebec City Film Festival	Grand Prize		Nominated
