= A Missing Part =

2024 Belgian-French film by Guillaume Senez

- French theatrical release poster
- French: Une part manquante
- Directed by: Guillaume Senez
- Written by: Guillaume Senez; Jean Denizot
- Produced by: Jacques-Henri Bronckart; David Thion
- Starring: Romain Duris; Judith Chemla; Mei Cirne-Masuki; Tsuyu; Shungiku Uchida; Yumi Narita; Patrick Descamps; Shinnosuke Abe
- Cinematography: Elin Kirschfink
- Edited by: Julie Brenta
- Music by: Olivier Marguerit
- Production companies: Les Films Pelléas; Versus Production
- Distributed by: Be for Films; Haut et Court
- Release dates: 9 September 2024 (TIFF); 13 November 2024 (France); 20 November 2024 (Belgium)
- Running time: 98 minutes
- Countries: Belgium; France
- Languages: French; Japanese
- Budget: €4,6 million

A Missing Part (French: Une part manquante) is a 2024 Belgian-French drama film directed by Guillaume Senez. It premiered at the Toronto International Film Festival on 9 September 2024.

== Premise ==
Having lost custody of his half-Japanese daughter after a divorce, a French taxi driver in Tokyo spends his days looking for her. When she finally enters his taxi, she does not recognize him.

== Cast ==
- Romain Duris as Jay
- Judith Chemla as Jessica
- Mei Cirne-Masuki as Lily
- Tsuyu
- Shungiku Uchida
- Yumi Narita as Keiko
- Patrick Descamps
- Shinnosuke Abe

== Production ==
Director Guillaume Senez was inspired to write the film after learning about post-divorce parental custody rights in Japan. To aid in their research, Senez and actor Romain Duris met with three French nationals who lost custody of their children due to Japanese law.

Principal photography began in October 2023. Filming locations included Tokyo, Sagami Bay, and Yokohama.

== Release ==
A clip from the film was released on 6 September 2024. The film premiered at the Toronto International Film Festival on 9 September 2024. It received a theatrical release in France on 13 November 2024.

The film closed the 40th Santa Barbara International Film Festival on 15 February 2025.

== Reception ==
David Opie of IndieWire gave the film a grade of B+, writing, "This often quiet, thoughtful story of a man who's incomplete reminds us to keep fighting for the part that's missing, whether that be striving for change or even just existing to fight another day."

Louis Roberts of Loud and Clear Reviews rated the film four stars out of five and wrote: "Serez's film raises questions that go beyond mere legislation, interrogating the attitudes that make up a country's social fabric. That he manages to achieve such ambitions without sacrificing the movie's intimacy speaks volumes about his craftsmanship."

Aurore Engelen of Cineuropa wrote: "Buoyed by a super-efficient screenplay, composed of little nothings which result in this impossible encounter, taking a chiaro-scuro path towards a resolution that's as luminous as it is doomed from the outset, A Missing Part explores both a father’s obsession and the irreconcilable otherness of a foreigner or stranger."

Paul Enicola of The Asian Cut complimented Senez's direction in portraying a "deglamorized Tokyo...allowing the city to emerge as a character in its own right. And with the urban landscape mirroring Jay's estrangement and alienation, the film [emphasizes] his growing sense of disconnect from a world that has always felt foreign to him."

== Accolades ==
Award	Date of ceremony	Category	Recipient(s)	Result	Ref.
Magritte Awards	22 February 2025	Best Film		Nominated	
Magritte Awards	22 February 2025	Best Sound	Nicolas Paturle, Virginie Messiaen, Franco Piscopo, and Olivier Thys	Nominated	
Magritte Awards	22 February 2025	Best Costume Design	Julie Lebrun	Nominated	
Magritte Awards	22 February 2025	Best Editing	Julie Brenta	Nominated	

== See also ==
- International child abduction in Japan
