= It's Raining in the House =

2023 film directed by Paloma Sermon-Daï

- Film poster
- French: Il pleut dans la maison
- Directed by: Paloma Sermon-Daï
- Written by: Paloma Sermon-Daï
- Produced by: Sébastien Andrés; Alice Lemaire
- Starring: Makenzy Lombet; Purdey Lombet
- Cinematography: Frédéric Noirhomme
- Edited by: Thijs Van Nuffel
- Production companies: Michigan Films; Kidam; Visualantics
- Distributed by: Cinéart
- Release dates: 19 May 2023 (Cannes); 10 April 2024
- Running time: 82 minutes
- Countries: Belgium; France
- Language: French

It's Raining in the House (French: Il pleut dans la maison) is a 2023 coming-of-age drama film written and directed by Paloma Sermon-Daï. An international co-production between Belgium and France, it marks Sermon-Daï's feature directorial debut. It follows two adolescent siblings navigating a summer on their own while grappling with economic hardship and personal challenges. It stars real-life siblings Makenzy and Purdey Lombet in their acting debut.

The film had its world premiere on 19 May 2023 at the 76th Cannes Film Festival, where it competed for the Camera d'Or. It received positive reviews from critics, who praised its naturalistic performances, the emotional depth of the sibling relationship, and Sermon-Daï's ability to blend realism with a poetic visual style. At the 14th Magritte Awards, It's Raining in the House received eight nominations, including Best Film and Best Director for Sermon-Daï. Makenzy and Purdey Lombet respectively were awarded Most Promising Actor and Most Promising Actress, making this the second film in history to win both awards.

== Plot ==
Set during a sweltering and stormy summer at a tourist-frequented lake, the film centers on 17-year-old Purdey and her 15-year-old brother, Makenzy. Left to fend for themselves after being abandoned by their mother, the siblings live in their dilapidated family home. Purdey takes up a job at a local hotel, while Makenzy resorts to stealing from tourists to make ends meet. The narrative oscillates between moments of youthful recklessness and the harsh realities of adult responsibilities, as the siblings learn to rely on each other for emotional and financial survival.

== Cast ==
- Makenzy Lombet as Makenzy
- Purdey Lombet as Purdey
- Donovan Nizet as Donovan
- Amine Hamidou as Youssef
- Louise Manteau as Leïla

== Production ==
It's Raining in the House marks the feature film debut of Paloma Sermon-Daï, following her short film Makenzy (2017) and the documentary Petit Samedi (2020). The screenplay, written by Sermon-Daï, draws on autobiographical elements and blends fiction with documentary techniques. The lead roles were played by real-life siblings Makenzy and Purdey Lombet, who are also relatives of Sermon-Daï. Both had previously appeared in the 2017 short film Makenzy. To prepare the actors for their roles, Sermon-Daï conducted acting and writing workshops, allowing the siblings to contribute to the development of scenes and dialogues. Despite this preparation, much of the film relied on improvisation, resulting in several unscripted moments being included in the final cut.

The film was shot at the Eau d'Heure lakes in Wallonia, Belgium, a region characterized by both high unemployment and significant tourist activity, with Frédéric Noirhomme serving as the cinematographer. Production wrapped in late August 2022 and involved production companies from Belgium and France, including Michigan Films, Kidam, and Visualantics. Financial support came from institutions such as the Centre du Cinéma et de l'Audiovisuel de la Fédération Wallonie-Bruxelles, Vlaams Audiovisueel Fonds, and RTBF.

== Release ==
The film premiered at the 2023 Cannes Film Festival during the Critics' Week on 19 May. It was eligible for the section's main award as well as the Caméra d'Or, which honors the best directorial debut. It went on to win the Critics' Week Jury Prize. It was also screened at the 2023 Namur Film Festival before its theatrical release, winning the Golden Bayard for Best Film and for Best Performance for Makenzy and Purdey Lombet.

It's Raining in the House was released on 3 April 2024 in France and on 10 April 2024 in Belgium, distributed by Condor and Cinéart respectively.

== Critical reception ==
It's Raining in the House received positive reviews from critics. The review aggregator website AlloCiné assigned the film a weighted average score of 3.5 out of 5, based on 13 critics. On Rotten Tomatoes, the film holds an approval rating of 80% based on five reviews, with an average rating of 7.3/10.

A critic from the Alliance of Women Film Journalists highlighted how the film "aggressively eschews the excesses of family melodrama" while still maintaining emotional resonance, noting that this restrained approach allows the film to have a heart without falling into sentimentality.

== Accolades ==
Award	Date of ceremony	Category	Recipient(s)	Result	Ref.
Cannes Film Festival	27 May 2023	Camera d'Or		Nominated	
Cannes Film Festival	27 May 2023	Critics' Week Grand Prize		Nominated	
Cannes Film Festival	27 May 2023	Critics' Week Jury Prize		Won	
Cinemania	17 November 2024	Best First Feature Film		Nominated	
Cinemania	17 November 2024	Best Director	Paloma Sermon-Daï	Won	
Magritte Awards	22 February 2025	Best Film		Nominated	
Magritte Awards	22 February 2025	Best Director	Paloma Sermon-Daï	Nominated	
Magritte Awards	22 February 2025	Best Supporting Actress	Louise Manteau	Won	
Magritte Awards	22 February 2025	Most Promising Actor	Makenzy Lombet	Won	
Magritte Awards	22 February 2025	Most Promising Actress	Purdey Lombet	Won	
Magritte Awards	22 February 2025	Best First Feature Film		Nominated	
Magritte Awards	22 February 2025	Best Cinematography	Frédéric Noirhomme	Nominated	
Magritte Awards	22 February 2025	Best Production Design	Ladys Oliviera Silva	Nominated	
Namur Film Festival	6 October 2023	Best Film		Won	
Namur Film Festival	6 October 2023	Best Performance	Makenzy Lombet	Won	
Namur Film Festival	6 October 2023	Best Performance	Purdey Lombet	Won	
