= Anne-Pascale Clairembourg =

Belgian actress

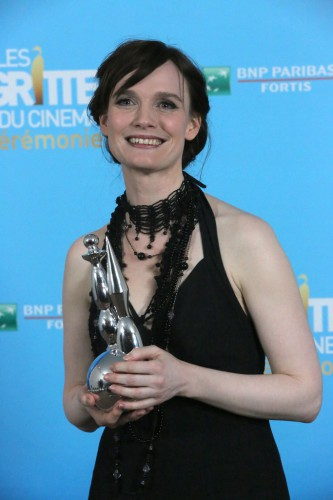
- Clairembourg at the 2012 Magritte Awards
- Born: Schaerbeek, Belgium
- Occupations: Stage and film actress
- Years active: 2000–present

Anne-Pascale Clairembourg is a Belgian stage and film actress.

== Early life and education ==
Anne-Pascale Clairembourg became interested in acting at early age and enrolled the Institute of Arts in Brussels, where she graduated in 2000.

== Career ==
Clairembourg began working in theatre. In 2005 and 2007 she was nominated for the Prix du Théâtre in Belgium, which she won in 2014. She appeared in the critically acclaimed play Tristesses (2016), which received the Jury Prize at the 2016 Avignon Festival. She also appeared in films, including Mobile Home (2012), which earned her a Magritte Award for Most Promising Actress, The Brand New Testament (2015), and Tamara (2016).

On 13 December 2016, it was announced that Clairembourg would host the 7th Magritte Awards.

== Filmography ==
=== Feature films ===
Year	Title	Role	Director	Notes
1996	Les Aveux de l'innocent	Restaurant waitress	Jean-Pierre Améris	
2009	Pour un fils	Nurse	Alix De Maistre	
2011	De leur vivant	Justine	Géraldine Doignon	
2011	Les Tribulations d'une caissière	Journaliste manifestation	Pierre Rambaldi	
2012	Mobile Home	Sylvie	François Pirot	Magritte Award for Most Promising Actress
2014	Être	Lisa	Fara Sene	
2015	The Brand New Testament	Willy's mother	Jaco Van Dormael	
2015	Un homme à la mer	Lab colleague	Géraldine Doignon	
2016	Tamara	Amandine	Alexandre Castagnetti	
2017	Above the Law	Prison director	François Troukens &Jean-François Hensgens	
2020	Night Shift	Martine	Anne Fontaine	
2021	Playground	Victoire's mother	Laura Wandel	
2022	La Très Très Grande Classe	Alice	Frédéric Quiring	
2025	Other	Elena	David Moreau	

=== Short films ===
Year	Title	Role	Director	Notes
2004	Les Demoiselles	Hermine	Sylvestre Sbille	
2007	2 soeurs	Mother	Emmanuel Jespers	
2010	Transparente	Eve	Sammy Fransquet	
2012	Le syndrome du cornichon		Géraldine Doignon	
2013	Partouze	Céline	Matthieu Donck	
2016	L'ombre d'un autre	Beatrice	Léo Médard	
2018	Accord parental	Mother	Benjamin Belloir	
2019	Gaïa	Fabienne	Christophe De Groef & Pierre Leo	
2022	Le mobilier	Gallerist	Mehdi Pierret	

=== Television ===
Year	Title	Role	Director	Notes
2016	The Break	Graphologist	Matthieu Donck	Season 1, Episode 6
2017	The Forest	Audrey Rinkert	Julius Berg	Miniseries; 5 episodes
2017	Unit 42	Sandra Magnot	Hendrik Moonen	Episode: "Connectée"
2019	Double je	Eléonore Brummet	Akim Isker	Episode: "Dernier Cru"
2020	The Middleman	Sylvia	Shira Geffen & Etgar Keret	Miniseries
2020	Balthazar	Clothilde Malerba	Camille Delamarre	Episode: "Un autre monde"
