= Marc Engels =

Belgian sound engineer (died 2020)

- Born: 29 October 1965; Brussels, Belgium
- Died: 9 April 2020 (aged 54); Brussels, Belgium
- Occupation: Sound engineer

Marc Engels (29 October 1965 – 9 April 2020) was a Belgian film sound engineer. He won the César Award for Best Sound in 2017 for his work on The Odyssey. Engels died of COVID-19 in April 2020, aged 54.

== Filmography ==
- Calvaire (2004)
- Komma (2006)
- Ex Drummer (2007)
- Outside the Law (2010)
- The Pack (2010)
- Largo Winch II (2011)
- A Happy Event (2011)
- Möbius (2013)
- À toute épreuve (2014)
- Prêt à tout (2014)
- Waste Land (2014)
- I'm Dead but I Have Friends (2015)
- Our Futures (2015)
- After Love (2016)
- Louis-Ferdinand Céline (2016)
- The Odyssey (2016)
- Mandy (2018 film)

== Awards and honours ==
- César Award for Best Sound for The Odyssey (2017)
- Nominated for Magritte Award for Best Sound for I'm Dead but I Have Friends (2016)
