= Diamant 13 =

- Directed by: Gilles Béhat
- Written by: Gilles Béat; Hugues Pagan; Olivier Marchal
- Produced by: Charles Gillibert; Marin Karmitz; Nathanaël Karmitz; Patrick Quinet; Claude Waringo
- Starring: Gérard Depardieu; Olivier Marchal; Asia Argento
- Cinematography: Bernard Malaisy
- Edited by: Thierry Faber
- Music by: Frédéric Vercheval
- Distributed by: MK2 Distribution
- Release dates: 21 January 2009 (France); 21 January 2009 (Belgium)
- Running time: 98 minutes
- Countries: France; Belgium; Luxembourg
- Language: French
- Budget: $8 million
- Box office: $740.000

Diamant 13 is a 2009 French-Belgian-Luxembourgish film noir co-written and directed by Gilles Béhat. The screenplay is based on Hugues Pagan's novel L'Étage des Morts. The film was nominated for a Magritte Award in the category of Best Original Score for Frédéric Vercheval in 2011.

== Synopsis ==
Mat is an aging, worn police officer. One day he is present when a criminal takes a female hostage in order to use the woman as a human shield. Mat refutes this strategy by shooting the man dead. The hostage remains unharmed but Mat knows all too well his action could have gone awry very easily. So afterwards he throws up and indulges himself to binge drinking. His constant enervation and his alcoholism have rendered him unacceptable as a law enforcer. When he is about to get sacked a former buddy contacts him. Franck has switched sides a long time ago and feels Mat would now be ready to condone this. But in spite of his misery Mat hesitates to become a drug trafficker. As fickle as he is it can work out either way.

== Cast ==
- Gérard Depardieu as Mat
- Olivier Marchal as Franck Novak
- Asia Argento as Calhoune
- Anne Coesens as Léon
- Aïssa Maïga as Farida
- Catherine Marchal as Z'yeux d'or (Golden Eyes)
- Aurélien Recoing as Ladje
- Erick Deshors as Spoke
- Marc Zinga as Ali Baba Mike
