= Binti (2019 film) =

2019 film

- Film poster
- Directed by: Frederike Migom
- Written by: Frederike Migom
- Produced by: Katleen Goossens
- Cinematography: Clemence Samson
- Edited by: Joachim Philippe
- Release date: 3 April 2019 (Belgium)
- Running time: 90 minutes
- Country: Belgium
- Language: Dutch

Binti is a 2019 Belgian drama film written and directed by Frederike Migom. Twelve-year-old Binti was born in the Congo but has lived with her father Jovial in Belgium since she was a baby. Despite not having any legal documents, Binti wants to live a normal life and dreams of becoming a famous vlogger. Elias (11) runs his 'save-the-okapi-club' without the help of his father, who's moved to Brazil following his divorce with Elias's mother. The police raid Binti and Jovial's home, sending the two on the run and Binti into the path of Elias. When their parents meet shortly after, Binti quickly sees the perfect solution to all her problems: if she can match her dad with Elias' mom, they can get married and stay in Belgium.

The film was screened at the 2020 Sundance Film Festival. At the 10th Magritte Awards, Binti received four nominations, including Best Flemish Film and Most Promising Actor for Baloji.

== Accolades ==
Award / Film Festival	Category	Recipients and nominees	Result
Ensor Award	Best Screenplay	Frederike Migom	Nominated
Ensor Award	Best Actress	Bebel Tshiani Baloji	Nominated
Ensor Award	Best Children Film		Won
Ensor Award	Best Original Score	Fabien Leclercq	Nominated
Ensor Award	Best Production Design	Talina Casier	Nominated
Magritte Award	Best Flemish Film		Nominated
Magritte Award	Most Promising Actor	Baloji	Nominated
Magritte Award	Most Promising Actress	Bebel Tshiani Baloji	Nominated
Magritte Award	Best Original Score	Fabien Leclercq	Nominated
