= Life's a Bitch (2023 film) =

2023 film directed by Xavier Seron

- Film poster
- French: Chiennes de vie
- Directed by: Xavier Seron
- Written by: Xavier Seron
- Produced by: Julie Esparbes
- Cinematography: Olivier Boonjing
- Edited by: Julie Naas
- Music by: Thomas Barrière
- Production company: Hélicotronc
- Distributed by: O'Brother
- Release dates: 11 November 2023 (Tallinn); 20 March 2024
- Running time: 88 minutes
- Country: Belgium
- Language: French

Life's a Bitch (French: Chiennes de vie) is a 2023 Belgian black comedy film written and directed by Xavier Seron. The film is structured as a choral comedy, comprising three interwoven stories where dogs serve as the common thread. It blends humor, surrealism, and tragedy, offering a satirical look at the complexity of human emotions and social dynamics.

The film had its world premiere at the Tallinn Black Nights Film Festival on 11 November 2023. Critics noted the film's ability to balance dark humor with poignant commentary on human relationships, loneliness, and societal norms. At the 14th Magritte Awards, Life's a Bitch received six nominations, including Best Screenplay for Seron and Best Actor for Jean-Jacques Rausin and Arieh Worthalter.

== Plot ==
The film follows three interwoven stories revolving around humans and their interactions with dogs. Tom (Jean-Jacques Rausin), a young man smitten with Cécile (Mara Taquin), the concierge's daughter, agrees to take care of his late neighbor's chihuahua. However, the dog, which appears harmless at first, turns out to have a menacing nature. Rumors that it may have driven its former owner to suicide begin to take on a chilling plausibility as Tom struggles to keep control of the situation.

In another story, Greta (Aurora Marion), a successful actress and ambassador for a luxury perfume brand, loses both her dog and her assistant in a tragic accident involving a truck. While processing this loss, she encounters Charlotte (Ninon Borsei) in a laundromat and unexpectedly proposes that Charlotte could step into her life, either as her assistant—or perhaps even as a substitute for her dog.

The third story centers on Franck (Arieh Worthalter) and Lola (Louise Manteau), who fall in love at first sight and quickly discover they share much in common. However, their budding romance is complicated by Lola's intense dislike of dogs, which clashes with Franck's deep affection for his pet, Perdita. Franck is forced to make a difficult choice between his new love and his beloved canine companion.

== Production ==
Xavier Seron described Life's Bitch as a film that uses dogs as a prism to examine human nature and society. According to the director, the stories reveal "the desolation, absurdity, grotesqueness, and tragedy of human comedy" through the interactions between people and their canine companions. The decision to shoot in black and white was deliberate, aiming to create a stark and organic visual style. Seron cited inspiration from photographers such as Daido Moriyama, Anders Petersen, and Michel Vanden Eeckhoudt, whose work often juxtaposes intimacy and surrealism. Similarly, British painter Briton Rivière's animal portraits and Shirley Baker's "People and Dogs" series were key influences in crafting the film's aesthetic.

Filming for Life's Bitch began in Brussels in the spring of 2022. The film was produced by Julie Esparbes through Hélicotronc on a limited budget. Seron further developed the script at the Groupe Ouest workshop, where he refined its themes and structure. The film was co-financed by the Centre du Cinéma et de l'Audiovisuel of the Fédération Wallonie-Bruxelles, with contributions from international distributor Be For Films and a number of Belgian broadcasters, including RTBF, VOO, and BeTV. Additional funding came through the Belgian Tax Shelter program and private sponsors such as ING Group.

== Release ==
Life's Bitch premiered on 11 November 2023 at the Tallinn Black Nights Film Festival, as part of the "Rebel for a Reason" selection. The film showed at the Dublin Film Festival in February 2025. It was also screened at the Les Arcs Film Festival before its theatrical release. The film was released theatrically in Belgium by O'Brother Distribution on 20 March 2024.

== Accolades ==
Award / Film Festival	Category	Recipients and nominees	Result
Bafici Awards	Best International Film		Nominated
FNC Awards	Best Film		Won
Magritte Awards	Best Screenplay	Xavier Seron	Nominated
Magritte Awards	Best Actor	Jean-Jacques Rausin	Nominated
Magritte Awards	Best Actor	Arieh Worthalter	Won
Magritte Awards	Most Promising Actress	Mara Taquin	Nominated
Magritte Awards	Best Sound	Marie Paulus, Valérie Le Docte, and Philippe Charbonnel	Nominated
Magritte Awards	Best Costume Design	Élise Abraham and Manon Golembieski	Nominated

== See also ==
- List of black-and-white films produced since 1966
