= Mothers' Instinct (2018 film) =

2018 film directed by Olivier Masset-Depasse

- Film poster
- Directed by: Olivier Masset-Depasse
- Screenplay by: Giordano Gederlini; Olivier Masset-Depasse
- Based on: Behind the Hatred by Barbara Abel
- Produced by: Jacques-Henri Bronckart; Olivier Bronckart
- Starring: Veerle Baetens; Anne Coesens; Mehdi Nebbou; Arieh Worthalter
- Cinematography: Hichame Alaouié
- Edited by: Damien Keyeux
- Music by: Frédéric Vercheval
- Release dates: 7 September 2018 (TIFF); 17 April 2019 (Belgium)
- Running time: 97 minutes
- Country: Belgium
- Language: French
- Box office: $134,286

Mothers' Instinct (French: Duelles) is a 2018 Belgian psychological thriller film directed by Olivier Masset-Depasse. The story is loosely based on the 2012 novel Behind the Hatred (Derrière la haine) by Barbara Abel. The film was screened as a special presentation at the 2018 Toronto International Film Festival.

It received ten nominations at the 10th Magritte Awards, winning nine, including Best Film and Best Director for Masset-Depasse, setting the record for the most Magritte Awards won by a single film. It was later overtaken by Night Call (2025), which won ten awards.

== Cast ==
- Veerle Baetens as Alice Brunelle
- Anne Coesens as Céline Geniot
- Mehdi Nebbou as Simon Brunelle
- Arieh Worthalter as Damien Geniot
- Jules Lefebvres as Theo Brunelle
- Luan Adam as Maxime Geniot
- Annick Blancheteau as Jeanne Brunelle

== Response ==
=== Critical reception ===
The film holds a 73% rating on Rotten Tomatoes based on 11 critic reviews, with an average rating of 5.5/10.

=== Accolades ===
Award / Film Festival	Category	Recipients and nominees	Result
Golden Atlas Award	Best Film		Nominated
Chicago International Film Festival	Best Film		Nominated
Magritte Awards	Best Film		Won
Magritte Awards	Best Director	Olivier Masset-Depasse	Won
Magritte Awards	Best Screenplay	Olivier Masset-Depasse	Won
Magritte Awards	Best Actress	Veerle Baetens	Won
Magritte Awards	Best Actress	Anne Coesens	Nominated
Magritte Awards	Best Supporting Actor	Arieh Worthalter	Won
Magritte Awards	Best Cinematography	Hichame Alaouié	Won
Magritte Awards	Best Original Score	Frédéric Vercheval	Won
Magritte Awards	Best Sound	Olivier Struye, Marc Bastien, Héléna Réveillère, Thomas Gauder	Won
Magritte Awards	Best Editing	Damien Keyeux	Won
World Soundtrack Awards	Best Original Score	Frédéric Vercheval	Won
