= European Film Award for Best Animated Feature Film =

Annual award

- Country: Europe
- Presented by: European Film Academy
- First award: Mia and the Migoo (2009)
- Currently held by: Arco (2025)
- Website: europeanfilmawards.eu

European Film Award for Best Animated Feature Film has been awarded annually since 2009 by the European Film Academy.

== Winners and nominees ==
=== 2009 ===
| Year | English title | Original title | Director(s) | Production country |
|---|---|---|---|---|
| 2009 (22nd) | Mia and the Migoo | Mia et le Migou | Jacques-Rémy Girerd | France, Italy |
| 2009 (22nd) | The Flight Before Christmas | Niko – Lentäjän poika | Michael Hegner and Kari Juusonen | Denmark, Finland, Germany, Ireland |
| 2009 (22nd) | The Secret of Kells | | Tomm Moore and Nora Twomey | Belgium, France, Ireland |

=== 2010s ===
| Year | English title | Original title | Director(s) | Country |
|---|---|---|---|---|
| 2010 (23rd) | The Illusionist | L'Illusionniste | Sylvain Chomet | France, United Kingdom |
| 2010 (23rd) | Planet 51 | Planeta 51 | Jorge Blanco | Spain, United Kingdom |
| 2010 (23rd) | Sammy's Adventures: The Secret Passage | Le Voyage extraordinaire de Samy | Ben Stassen | Belgium |
| 2011 (24th) | Chico and Rita | Chico y Rita | Tono Errando, Javier Mariscal and Fernando Trueba | Spain, Isle of Man, Hungary |
| 2011 (24th) | The Rabbi's Cat | Le Chat du rabbin | Antoine Delesvaux and Joann Sfar | France |
| 2011 (24th) | A Cat in Paris | Une vie de chat | Jean-Loup Felicioli and Alain Gagnol | France, Belgium |
| 2012 (25th) | Alois Nebel | | Tomáš Luňák | Czech Republic, Germany |
| 2012 (25th) | Wrinkles | Arrugas | Ignacio Ferreras | Spain |
| 2012 (25th) | The Pirates! In an Adventure with Scientists! | | Peter Lord and Jeff Newitt | United Kingdom, United States |
| 2013 (26th) | The Congress | Le Congrès | Ari Folman | France, Israel, Belgium, Poland, Luxembourg, Germany |
| 2013 (26th) | Jasmine | | Alain Ughetto | France |
| 2013 (26th) | Pinocchio | | Enzo D'Alò | Italy, Luxembourg, France, Belgium |
| 2014 (27th) | The Art of Happiness | L'arte della felicità | Alessandro Rak | Italy |
| 2014 (27th) | Jack and the Cuckoo-Clock Heart | Jack et la mécanique du cœur | Stéphane Berla and Mathias Malzieu | France, Belgium |
| 2014 (27th) | Minuscule: Valley of the Lost Ants | Minuscule – La vallée des fourmis perdues | Hélène Giraud and Thomas Szabo | France, Belgium |
| 2015 (28th) | Song of the Sea | | Tomm Moore | Ireland, France, Luxembourg, Denmark, Belgium |
| 2015 (28th) | Shaun the Sheep Movie | | Richard Starzak and Mark Burton | United Kingdom |
| 2015 (28th) | Adama | | Simon Rouby | France |
| 2016 (29th) | My Life as a Courgette | Ma vie de courgette | Claude Barras | Switzerland, France |
| 2016 (29th) | Birdboy: The Forgotten Children | Psiconautas, los niños olvidados | Alberto Vázquez and Pedro Rivero | Spain |
| 2016 (29th) | The Red Turtle | La tortue rouge | Michaël Dudok de Wit | France, Germany |
| 2017 (30th) | Loving Vincent | | DK Welchman and Hugh Welchman | Poland, United Kingdom |
| 2017 (30th) | Ethel & Ernest | | Roger Mainwood | United Kingdom, Luxembourg |
| 2017 (30th) | Louise by the Shore | Louise en hiver | Jean-François Laguionie | France, Canada |
| 2017 (30th) | Zombillenium | Zombillénium | Arthur de Pins and Alexis Ducord | France, Belgium |
| 2018 (31st) | Another Day of Life | Jeszcze dzień życia | Raul de la Fuente and Damian Nenow | Poland, Spain, Belgium, Germany, Hungary |
| 2018 (31st) | Early Man | | Nick Park | United Kingdom |
| 2018 (31st) | The Breadwinner | | Nora Twomey | Ireland, Canada, Luxembourg |
| 2018 (31st) | White Fang | Croc-Blanc | Alexandre Espigares | France, Luxembourg |
| 2019 (32nd) | Buñuel in the Labyrinth of the Turtles | Buñuel en el laberinto de las tortugas | Salvador Simó | Spain |
| 2019 (32nd) | I Lost My Body | J'ai perdu mon corps | Jérémy Clapin | France |
| 2019 (32nd) | The Swallows of Kabul | Les hirondelles de Kaboul | Zabou Breitman and Eléa Gobé Mévellec | France |
| 2019 (32nd) | Marona's Fantastic Tale | L'extraordinaire voyage de Marona | Anca Damian | France, Romania, Belgium |

=== 2020s ===
| Year | English title | Original title | Director(s) | Country |
|---|---|---|---|---|
| 2020 (33rd) | Josep | | Aurel | France, Belgium, Spain |
| 2020 (33rd) | Calamity | | Henri Magalon and Claire Lacombe | France, Denmark |
| 2020 (33rd) | Klaus | | Sergio Pablos | Spain, United States |
| 2020 (33rd) | The Nose or the Conspiracy of Mavericks | Нос, или Заговор нетаких | Andrey Khrzhanovsky | Russia |
| 2021 (34th) | Flee | Flugt | Jonas Poher Rasmussen | Denmark, France, Sweden, Norway, United Kingdom, United States |
| 2021 (34th) | Even Mice Belong in Heaven | Myši patří do nebe | Denisa Grimmová and Jan Bubenícek | Czech Republic, France, Poland, Slovakia |
| 2021 (34th) | The Ape Star | Apstjärnan | Linda Hambäck | Sweden, Norway, Denmark |
| 2021 (34th) | Where Is Anne Frank | | Ari Folman | Belgium, Israel, Netherlands, France |
| 2021 (34th) | Wolfwalkers | | Tomm Moore and Ross Stewart | Ireland, Luxembourg |
| 2022 (35th) | No Dogs or Italians Allowed | Interdit aux chiens et aux Italiens | Alain Ughetto | France, Italy, Belgium, Switzerland, Portugal |
| 2022 (35th) | Little Nicholas: Happy As Can Be | Le Petit Nicolas: Qu'est-ce qu'on attend pour être heureux? | Amandine Fredon and Benjamin Massoubre | France, Luxembourg |
| 2022 (35th) | My Love Affair with Marriage | | Signe Baumane | Latvia, United States, Luxembourg |
| 2022 (35th) | My Neighbors' Neighbors | Les voisins de mes voisins sont mes voisins | Anne-Laure Daffis & Léo Marchand | France |
| 2022 (35th) | Oink | Knor | Mascha Halberstad | Netherlands, Belgium |
| 2023 (36th) | Robot Dreams | | Pablo Berger | France, Spain |
| 2023 (36th) | The Amazing Maurice | | Toby Genkel | Germany, United Kingdom |
| 2023 (36th) | Chicken for Linda! | Linda veut du poulet! | Sébastien Laudenbach and Chiara Malta | France, Italy |
| 2023 (36th) | A Greyhound of a Girl | | Enzo d’Alò | Estonia, Germany, Ireland, Italy, Latvia, Luxembourg, United Kingdom |
| 2023 (36th) | White Plastic Sky | Müanyag égbolt | Tibor Bánóczki and Sarolta Szabó | Hungary, Slovakia |
| 2024 (37th) | Flow | Straume | Gints Zilbalodis | Latvia, France, Belgium |
| 2024 (37th) | Living Large | Život k sežrání | Kristina Dufková | Czech Republic / France / Slovakia |
| 2024 (37th) | Savages | Sauvages | Claude Barras | Switzerland / France / Belgium |
| 2024 (37th) | Sultana's Dream | El sueño de la sultana | Isabel Herguera | Spain / Germany / India |
| 2024 (37th) | They Shot the Piano Player | Dispararon al pianista | Fernando Trueba; Javier Mariscal | Spain / France / Netherlands / Portugal / Peru |
| 2025 (38th) | Arco | | Ugo Bienvenu | France, United States |
| 2025 (38th) | Dog of God | Dieva suns | Lauris Ābele; Raitis Ābele | Latvia, United States |
| 2025 (38th) | Little Amélie or the Character of Rain | Amélie et la métaphysique des tubes | Liane-Cho Han; Maïlys Vallade | Belgium, France |
| 2025 (38th) | Olivia and the Invisible Earthquake | L'Olívia i el terratrèmol invisible | Irene Iborra Rizo | Belgium, Chile, France, Spain, Switzerland |
| 2025 (38th) | Tales from the Magic Garden | Pohádky po babičce | Patrik Pašš; Jean-Claude Rozec; David Súkup; Leon Vidmar | Czech Republic, France, Slovakia, Slovenia |
| 2026 (39th) | In Waves | | Phuong Mai Nguyen | France, Belgium |
| 2026 (39th) | Iron Boy | Le Corset | Louis Clichy | France, Belgium |
| 2026 (39th) | Jim Queen | Jim Queen à la recherche de la Chloroqueer | Nicolas Athané and Marco Nguyen | France, Belgium |
| 2026 (39th) | Lucy Lost | Le mystère Lucy Lost | Olivier Clert | France |
| 2026 (39th) | Viva Carmen | Carmen, l'oiseau rebelle | Sébastian Laudenbach | France, Finland, Spain |

== Directors with multiple nominations ==
- Tomm Moore - 3 (one win)
- Ari Folman - 2 (one win)
- Claude Barras - 2 (one win)
- Nora Twomey - 2

== Most wins for Best Animated Feature by country ==
| Country | Awards (as main country) | Nominations (as main country) | Awards (with co-productions) | Nominations (with co-productions) |
|---|---|---|---|---|
| France | 2 | 12 | 5 | 16 |
| Poland | 2 | 2 | 4 | 4 |
| Spain | 1 | 4 | 1 | 4 |
| Latvia | 1 | 3 | 1 | 3 |
| Italy | 1 | 2 | 2 | 3 |
| (Republic of Ireland) Ireland | 1 | 1 | 1 | 1 |
| Israel | 1 | 1 | 1 | 1 |
| Czech Republic | 1 | 1 | 1 | 1 |
| United Kingdom | 0 | 4 | 4 | 10 |
| Belgium | 0 | 2 | 2 | 9 |
| (Luxembourg) Luxemburg | 0 | 0 | 2 | 4 |
| Germany | 0 | 0 | 2 | 3 |
| Denmark | 0 | 0 | 1 | 1 |
| Isle of Man | 0 | 0 | 1 | 1 |
| Switzerland | 0 | 0 | 1 | 1 |
| United States | 0 | 0 | 2 | 5 |
| Canada | 0 | 0 | 0 | 1 |

== See also ==
- Academy Award for Best Animated Feature
- BAFTA Award for Best Animated Film
- César Award for Best Animated Film
- Goya Award for Best Animated Film
- Annie Award for Best Animated Feature — Independent
- Annie Award for Best Animated Feature
- Dallas–Fort Worth Film Critics Association Award for Best Animated Film
