= Savages (2024 film) =

- Swiss release poster
- French: Sauvages
- Directed by: Claude Barras
- Screenplay by: Claude Barras; Catherine Paillé
- Starring: Babette De Coster; Martin Verset
- Music by: Charles de Ville; Nelly Tungang
- Production companies: Nadasdy Film; Haut et Court; Panique!
- Distributed by: Frenetic Films (Switzerland); Haut et Court (France); Cinéart (Benelux)
- Release dates: 18 May 2024 (Cannes); 16 October 2024 (France, Belgium, and Switzerland)
- Running time: 86 minutes
- Countries: Switzerland; France; Belgium
- Language: French
- Budget: ₣13 million
- Box office: $843,588

Savages (French: Sauvages) is a 2024 stop motion animated film directed by Claude Barras and starring Babette De Coster and Martin Verset.

== Premise ==
Kéria (De Coster), a young girl lives with her father in the Serawak province of Borneo while he works in a palm oil plantation. Her late mother had been part of the indigenous Penan people, but Kéria has little interest in this aspect of her heritage. She and her father rescue an orangutan, who comes to be known as Oshi. When Kéria's Penan cousin Selaï (Verset) is displaced from her home by deforestation and comes to live with the family, the two children and orangutan must fight back against the logging companies.

== Cast ==
- Babette De Coster as Kéria
- Martin Verset as Selaï
- Laetitia Dosch as Jeanne
- Benoît Poelvoorde as Kéria's father
- Pierre-Isaïe Duc as Kéria's grandfather
- Michel Vuillermoz as the foreman
- Gaël Faye
- Sailyvia Paysan as Selaï's mother
- Anna-Marie Missoul

== Production ==
Barras began conceptualizing Savages while on the year-long press tour for his 2016 Academy Award-nominated feature film My Life as a Courgette.

== Release ==
Savages premiered out of competition in the Young Audiences section of the 2024 Cannes Film Festival on 18 May 2024. The film also played in competition at the Annecy International Animation Film Festival and is scheduled to screen at the 77th Locarno Film Festival, where Barras will be recognized with the Locarno Kids Award la Mobiliare. The film was released in France, Belgium, and Switzerland on 16 October 2024.

== Reception ==
=== Critical reception ===
On the review aggregator website Rotten Tomatoes, 100% of 7 critics' reviews are positive, with an average rating of 7.8/10.

=== Accolades ===
| Award | Ceremony date | Category | Recipient(s) | Result | Ref. |
|---|---|---|---|---|---|
| Annecy International Animated Film Festival | 15 June 2024 | Best Feature Film | Savages | Nominated | |
| European Film Awards | 7 December 2024 | European Animated Feature Film | Savages | Nominated | |
| Magritte Awards | 22 February 2025 | Best Foreign Film | Savages | Nominated | |
| Magritte Awards | 22 February 2025 | Best Original Score | Charles de Ville and Nelly Tungang | Won | |
