= Amal (2023 film) =

2023 film directed by Jawad Rhalib

- Film poster
- Directed by: Jawad Rhalib
- Written by: Jawad Rhalib; David Lambert; Chloé Léonil
- Produced by: Geneviève Lemal
- Starring: Lubna Azabal; Fabrizio Rongione; Catherine Salée
- Cinematography: Lisa Willame
- Edited by: Nicolas Rumpl
- Production company: Scope Pictures
- Distributed by: Telescope
- Release dates: 12 October 2023 (Ghent); 7 February 2024
- Running time: 107 minutes
- Country: Belgium
- Languages: French; Arabic

Amal is a 2023 Belgian drama film directed by Jawad Rhalib and written by Rhalib, David Lambert, and Chloé Léonil. It stars Lubna Azabal as Amal, a high school literature teacher in Brussels, whose decision to teach the works of Arabic poet Abu Nuwas sparks resistance from her community. The cast also features Fabrizio Rongione, Catherine Salée, Kenza Benboutcha, Ethelle Gonzalez Lardued, Johan Heldenbergh, Babetida Sadjo, and Mehdy Khachachi.

The film had its world premiere at the 50th Ghent Film Festival on 12 October 2023. It received critical acclaim for its portrayal of the conflicts between personal beliefs and societal expectations as well as for its screenplay and cast performances. At the 14th Magritte Awards, Amal received nine nominations, including Best Film and Best Director for Rhalib, winning Best Actress for Azabal.

== Plot ==
The film centers on Amal (Lubna Azabal), a dedicated literature teacher who aims to create a space for free expression in her classroom. Her choice to include the controversial works of Arabic poet Abu Nuwas in her curriculum leads to backlash, initially from her students and eventually from their parents. This opposition grows into a campaign of harassment, leaving Amal increasingly isolated and under pressure. The story also highlights the experiences of her students, including Monia (Kenza Benboutcha), a lesbian teenager facing bullying, and Rachid (Mehdy Khachachi), the nephew of Nabil (Fabrizio Rongione), a religion teacher and imam at the school.

== Critical reception ==
Amal has been widely praised for its nuanced portrayal of complex social issues and the strength of its performances, with particular emphasis on the young cast. The review aggregator website Cinebel assigned the film a weighted average score of 8.5 out of 10, based on four critics.

== Accolades ==
Award / Film Festival	Category	Recipients and nominees	Result
Días de cine	Best International Film		Runner-up
Días de cine	Best International Actress	Lubna Azabal	Won
Magritte Awards	Best Film		Nominated
Magritte Awards	Best Director	Jawad Rhalib	Nominated
Magritte Awards	Best Screenplay	Jawad Rhalib	Nominated
Magritte Awards	Best Actress	Lubna Azabal	Won
Magritte Awards	Best Supporting Actor	Fabrizio Rongione	Nominated
Magritte Awards	Best Supporting Actress	Catherine Salée	Nominated
Magritte Awards	Most Promising Actor	Amine Hamidou	Nominated
Magritte Awards	Most Promising Actor	Mehdi Khachachi	Nominated
Magritte Awards	Most Promising Actress	Kenza Benbouchta	Nominated
Tallinn Black Nights Film Festival	Grand Prix		Nominated
Tallinn Black Nights Film Festival	Best Actress	Lubna Azabal	Won
