= Frédéric Vercheval =

Belgian musician and composer

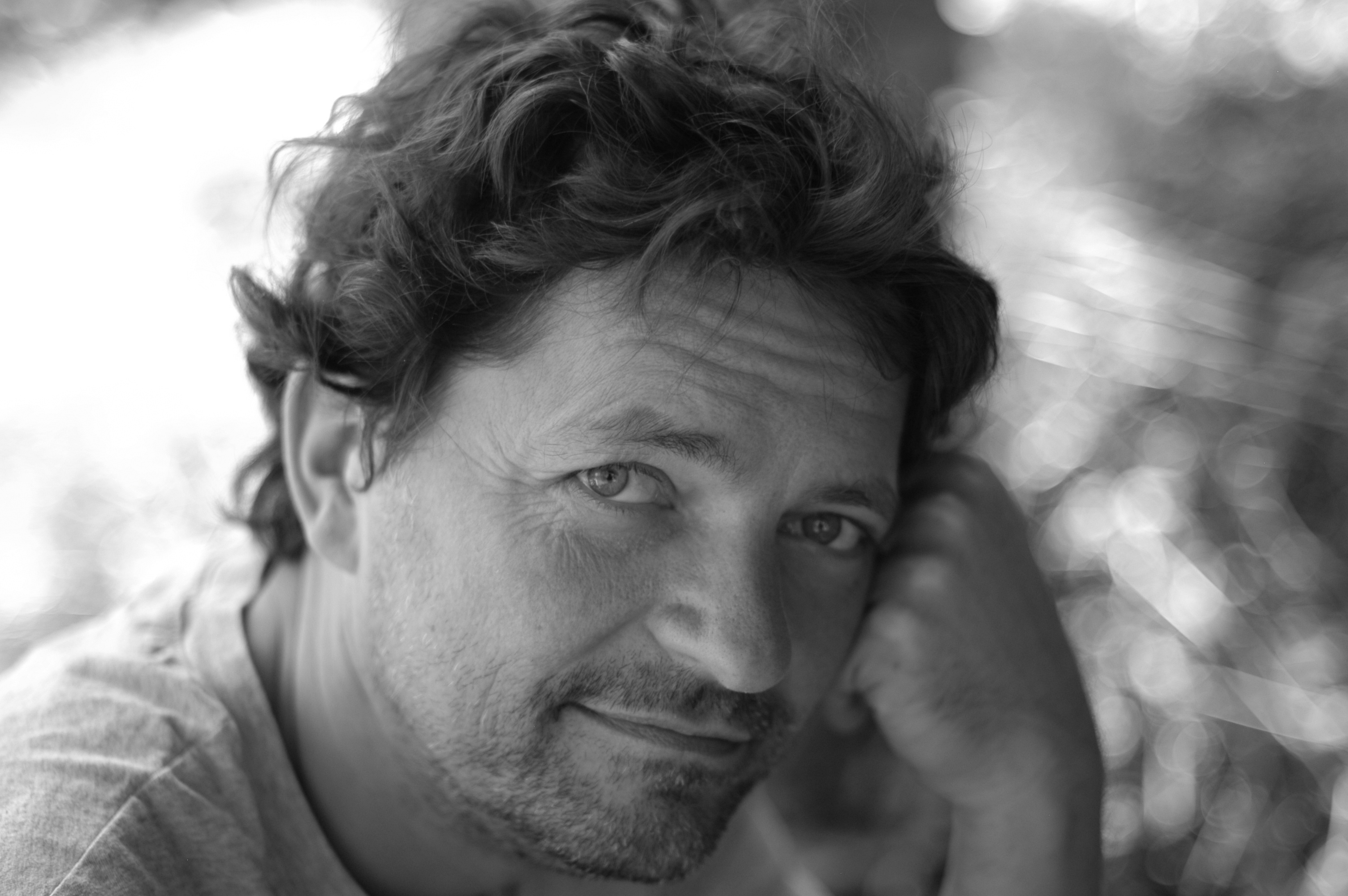
Frédéric Vercheval

Frédéric Vercheval is a Belgian musician and composer. He studied at the Jazz Studio, a music school of Antwerp, Belgium. Vercheval was nominated for the Magritte Award for Best Original Score five times for his work in Diamant 13 (2009), Krach (2010), Not My Type (2014), Melody (2014) and Mothers' Instinct (2019).
