= Lubna Azabal =

Belgian actress

Lubna Azabal لبنى أزابال
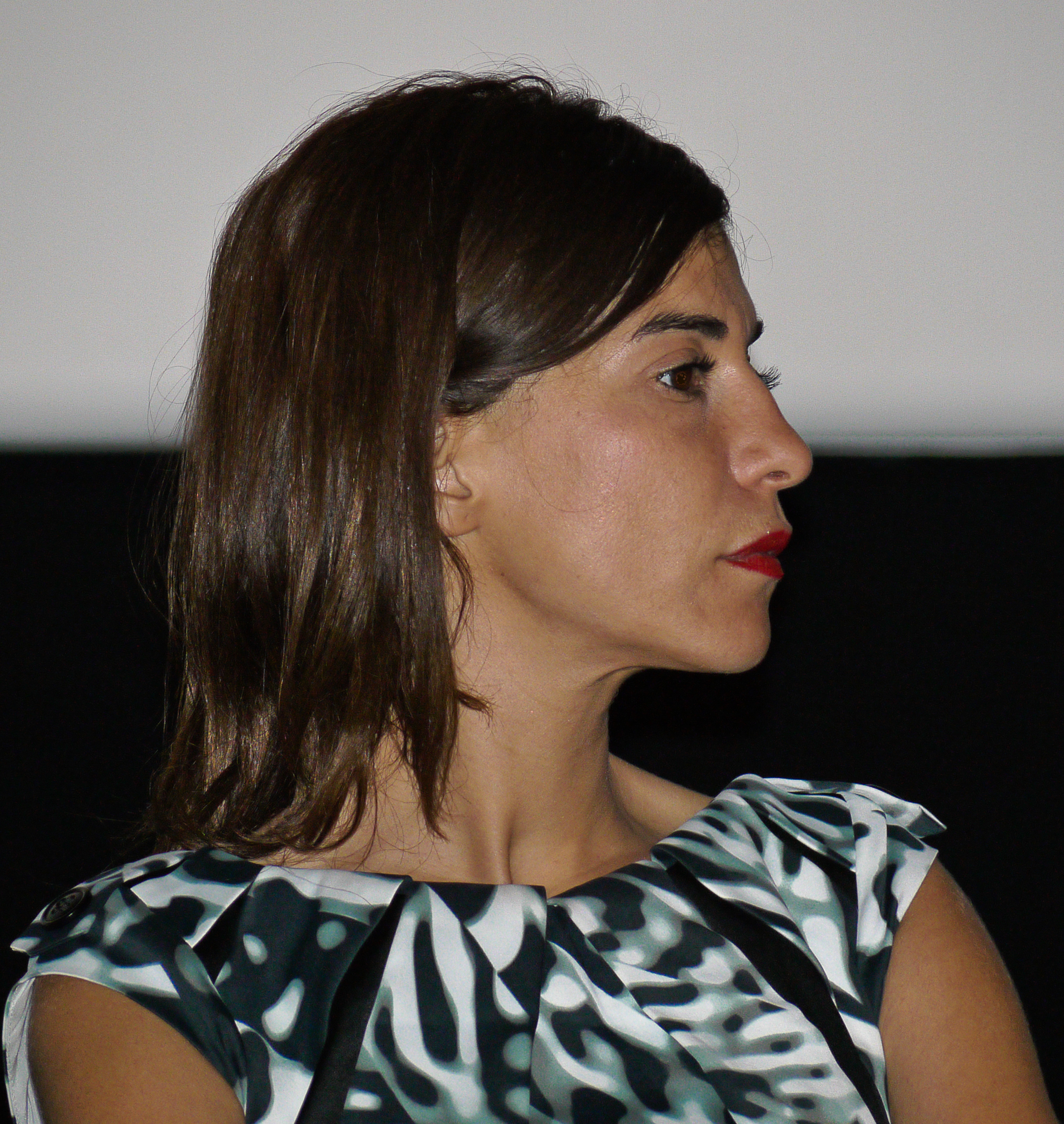
- Azabal in 2011
- Born: Loubna Azabal; Brussels, Belgium
- Education: Royal Conservatory of Brussels
- Notable work: Paradise Now; Incendies; The Honourable Woman

Comedy career
- Years active: 1998–present
- Medium: Actress

Lubna Azabal is a Belgian actress. She is known for her performances in Paradise Now and Incendies.

== Biography ==
Lubna Azabal was born in Brussels to a Moroccan father and a Spanish mother. She is studying at the Royal Conservatory of Brussels.

== Career ==
Azabal began a theatrical career in Belgium. In 1997, she took her first film role when Belgian film-maker Vincent Lannoo chose her to act beside Olivier Gourmet in his short film J'adore le cinéma. She performs in English, French and Arabic.

Her most widely known film role is in the 2005 political thriller, Paradise Now. She appears in a smaller role in Ridley Scott's Body of Lies. She has a lead part alongside Maggie Gyllenhaal in Hugo Blick's 2014 BBC TV miniseries The Honourable Woman.

She starred opposite Ben Foster in the independent film Here (2011).

In 2018, Azabal appeared as Susannah in Helen Edmundson's film Mary Magdalene.

== Awards ==
Azabal won the Black Pearl Award 2010 (Abu Dhabi Film Festival) for Best Actress for her role in the film Incendies. She also won the Genie Award for Best Performance by an Actress in a Leading Role at the 31st Genie Awards and the Magritte Award for Best Actress at the 2nd Magritte Awards.

== Selected filmography ==
- Pure Fiction (1998)
- Les Siestes grenadine (1999) - Mabrouka
- Loin (2001) - Sarah
- Almost Peaceful (2002) - Jacqueline
- Aram (2002) - Méliné
- Une minute de soleil en moins (2002, TV Movie) - Touria
- 25 degrés en hiver (2004) - Loubna
- Viva Laldjérie (2004) - Goucem
- Exils (2004) - Naima
- Changing Times (Les temps qui changent) (2004) - Nadia / Aïcha
- Paradise Now (2005) - Suha
- Strangers (2007) - Rana Sweid
- 24 mesures (2007) - Helly
- Body of Lies (2008) - Aisha's Sister Cala
- Occupation (2009, TV mini-series) - Aliya Nabil
- Gamines (2009) - Angela Di Biaggio
- Une chaîne pour deux (2009) - Corinne
- Comme les cinq doigts de la main (2010) - Amel Zeroual
- Incendies (2010) - Nawal Marwan
- I Am Slave (2010)
- Captifs (2010)
- Here (2011) - Gadarine Nazarian
- Coriolanus (2011) - First Citizen (Tamora)
- Lipstikka (2011)
- Free Men (2011) - Leila
- Headwinds (2011) - La mère de Yamine
- Goodbye Morocco (2012) - Dounia
- Rock the Casbah (2013) - Kenza
- The Marchers (2013) - Kheira
- The Honourable Woman (2014, TV mini-series) - Atika Halabi
- Grain (2015)
- Ustica: The Missing Paper (2016) - Valja Bogdani
- The Frozen Dead (2016-2017, TV Series) - Elisabeth Ferney
- Light Thereafter (2017) - Soumaya
- Lola Pater (2017) - Malika, Zino's mother
- Grain (2017) - Beatrice
- Catch the Wind (2017) - Nadia
- Above the Law (2017) - Lucie Tesla
- Mary Magdalene (2018) - Susannah
- A Bluebird in My Heart (2018) - Nadia
- Sofia (2018) - Leila
- Tel Aviv on Fire (2018) - Tala / Manal aka Rachel
- Hellhole (2019) - Samira
- Adam (2019) - Abla
- The Blue Caftan (2022) - Mina
- El Houb (The Love) (2022) - Fatima Zahwani
- For My Country (2022) - Nadia
- Amal (2023) - Amal
- Maldoror (2024) - Mrs. Santos
- Somewhere In Love (2024)
- Rabia (2024) - Madame
- Hot Water (2026) - Layla

== Selected stage appearances ==
- Doña Rosita la soltera by Federico García Lorca (1999)
- L’Horloge et le désert by Ghassan Kanafani (2000)
- Une nuit arabe by Roland Schimmelpfenning (2002)
- Le Tampon vert by Aziz Chouaki (2003)
- L’Île aux esclaves by Marivaux (2006)

== Awards ==
- Winner: 2023 Tallinn Black Nights Film Festival - Best Actress for Amal
- Nominated: 2022 Magritte Award - Best Actress for Adam
- Nominated: 2020 Magritte Award - Best Actress for Tel Aviv on Fire
- Winner: 2019 Magritte Award - Best Actress for Above the Law
- Winner: 2015 Magritte Award - Best Supporting Actress for The Marchers
- Nominated: 2014 Magritte Award - Best Actress for Goodbye Marocco
- Winner: 2012 Magritte Award - Best Actress for Incendies
- Winner: 2011 31st Genie Awards - Genie Award for Best Performance by an Actress in a Leading Role for Incendies
- Winner: 2011 Jutra Award - Best Actress for Incendies
- Winner: 2011 Vancouver Film Critics Circle Award for Best Actress in a Canadian Film for Incendies
- Winner: 2007 Jerusalem Film Festival - Most Promising Actress for Strangers
