= Dead Man Talking =

- Theatrical release poster
- Directed by: Patrick Ridremont
- Written by: Patrick Ridremont; Jean-Sébastien Lopez
- Cinematography: Danny Elsen
- Edited by: Thierry Delvigne
- Music by: Matthieu Gonet
- Production companies: Nexus Factory; Bidibul Productions; Superprod
- Release dates: September 29, 2012 (Namur Film Festival); October 3, 2012 (Belgium)
- Running time: 101 minutes
- Countries: Belgium; France
- Language: French

Dead Man Talking is a 2012 Belgian comedy-drama film directed by Patrick Ridremont. It was written by Ridremont and Jean-Sébastien Lopez. It premiered on September 29, 2012, at the Festival International du Film Francophone de Namur. The film was nominated for eight Magritte Awards, winning Best Production Design for Alina Santos. It has also been nominated for the Best Foreign Film award at the 39th César Awards.

== Cast ==
- François Berléand as Karl Raven
- Virginie Efira as Élisabeth Lacroix
- Patrick Ridremont as William Lamers
- Christian Marin as Georges
- Jean-Luc Couchard as Stieg Brodeck
- Olivier Leborgne as Robert Gayland
- Denis Mpunga as Julius Lopez
- Pauline Burlet as Mme Raven
- Leila Schaus as Florence
- Joffrey Verbruggen as Ruy Blas
