= Jawad Rhalib =

Belgian-Moroccan filmmaker

- Born: 8 November 1965 (age 60)
- Citizenship: Morocco, Belgium
- Occupations: Film director, Screenwriter

Jawad Rhalib (born 1965 in Morocco) is a Belgian-Moroccan filmmaker. His films, which generally tackle the themes of human rights and social realism, have been screened at numerous international film festivals and have received numerous awards.

== Biography ==
Rhalib was born in Morocco to Moroccan parents. He attended the Catholic University of Louvain-La-Neuve, graduating with a degree in communications. Before launching his film career in 1997, Rhalib was a journalist.

== Filmography ==
=== Feature films ===
- 2014: 7 rue de la Folie
- 2016: Rebellious Girl (Insoumise)
- 2023: Amal

=== Documentaries ===
Sources:

- 1999: In the Name of Coke (Au nom de la coca)
- 2006: El Ejido: The Law of Profit (El Ejido, la loi du profit)
- 2008: The Damned of the Sea (Les Damnés de la mer)
- 2013: The Song of Turtles (Le chant des tortues)
- 2016: The Swallows of Love (Les hirondelles de l'amour)
- 2018: When Arabs Danced (Au temps ou les Arabes dansaient)
- 2020: The Pink Revolution
- 2020: Fadma: Even Ants Have Wings
- 2024: Since I Was Born (Puisque je suis née)
