= Hande Kodja =

Belgian actress (born 1984)

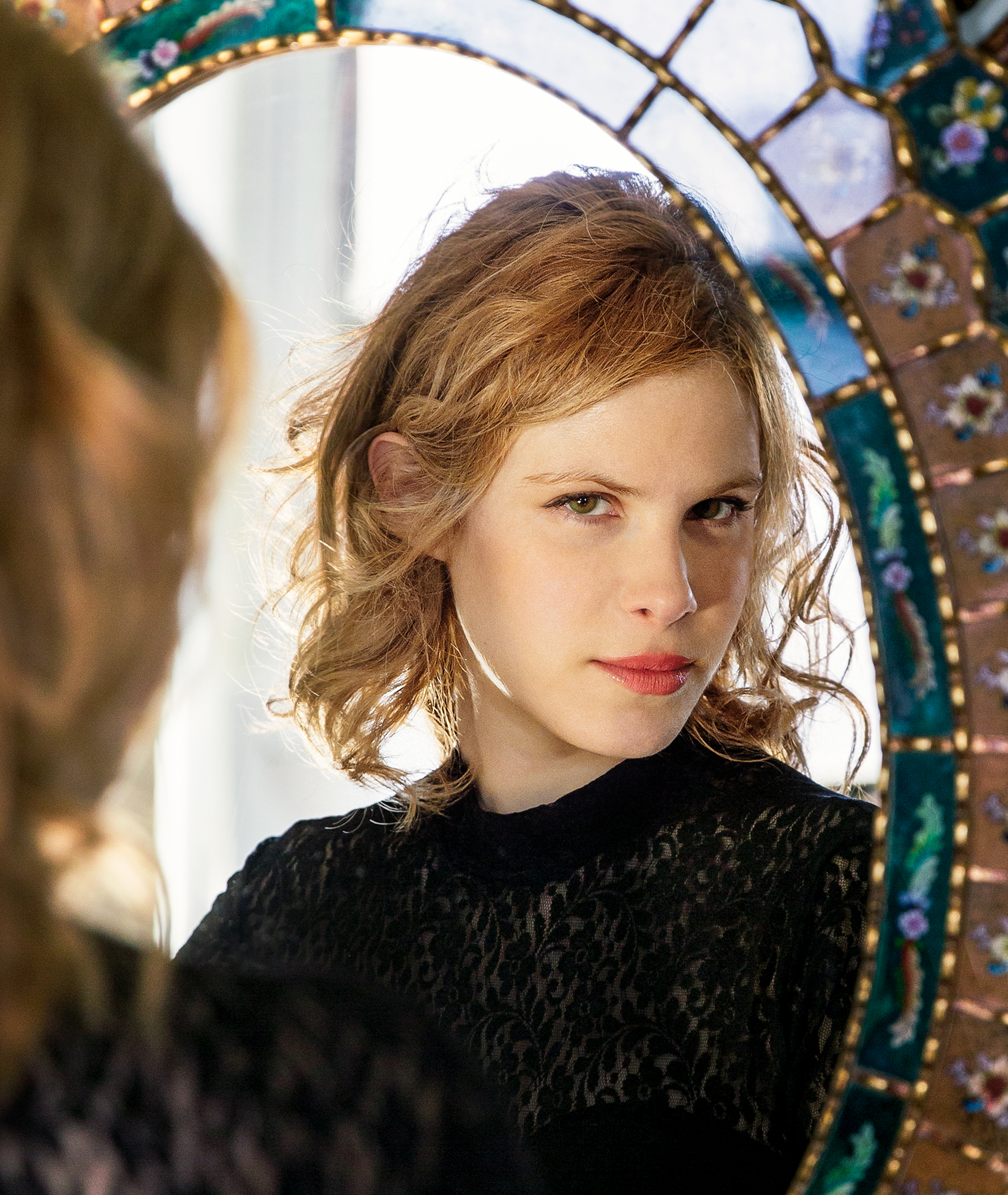
- Born: 6 February 1984 (age 41); Brussels, Belgium
- Occupation: Actress

Hande Kodja (born 6 February 1984) is a Belgian actress.

== Biography ==
Kodja was born in Brussels, Belgium, on 6 February 1984 to a father of Russian-Turkish descent and a Belgian mother. She began her artistic training in Waterloo, Belgium with music (piano, violin, flute) and drama. After her baccalaureate, she arrives in Paris. She studied for two years at the Cours Florent before completing the entrance examination at the National Conservatory of Dramatic Arts in Paris, where she completed her training before continuing her artistic quest by exploring drawing and sculpture.

She is nominated for best female hope for her role in Marieke Marieke by Sophie Schoukens and best actress for Rosenn, alongside Rupert Everett and Béatrice Dalle.

She was able to stand up to Charlotte de Turckheim in La Permission, and play the leading female role alongside Gerard Jugnot in The Law of Alexander.

Hande Kodja was also the voice of Lisbeth Salander in the radio adaptations of Millenium for France Culture.

She's been the acolyte of Mathieu Demy in the Bureau des Légendes on Canal +.

Recently she just finished a movie about Van Gogh and another Belgian comedy "Music Hole"

== Filmography ==
- 2011 : Marieke, Marieke by Sophie Schoukens (Official selection of the San Sebastián International Film Festival, "Film Francophone de Namur").
- 2011 : Rani by Arnaud Sélignac with Mylène Jampanoï (France 2).
- 2012 : The Unlikely Girl de Wei Ling Chang : Cécile
- 2013 : Des gens qui s'embrassent de Danièle Thompson : Louise
- 2012 : One Man's Loss de Philip Sansom 2012: Rosennwith Rupert Everett and Béatrice Dalle by Yvan Lemoine
- 2014 : L'Insoumise by Jawad Rhalib
- 2016 : The law of Alexandre (TV Mini-Series)
- 2015 Le Bureau des Légendes saison 2
- 2016 Le Bureau des Légendes saison 3
- 2018 Music Hole by David Muztenmacher and Gaetan Lickens
- Van Gogh by Jean-Luc Ayach

== Radio ==
- 2011 : Millénium I - adaptation en feuilleton radiophonique du livre de Stieg Larsson pour France Culture
- 2012 : Millénium II - adaptation en feuilleton radiophonique du livre de Stieg Larsson pour France Culture

== Nominations ==
- 2012 : nomination meilleur espoir féminin au Magritte du cinéma pour Marieke, Marieke de Sophie Schoukens
- 2014 : Nomination meilleur espoir féminin au Magritte du cinéma pour Rosenn d'Yvan Le Moine
