= Almayer's Folly (film) =

- French poster
- Directed by: Chantal Akerman
- Screenplay by: Chantal Akerman
- Based on: Almayer's Folly by Joseph Conrad
- Produced by: Patrick Quinet
- Starring: Stanislas Merhar; Aurora Marion; Marc Barbé
- Edited by: Claire Atherton
- Music by: Steve Dzialowski
- Production companies: Liaison Cinématographique; Paradise Films
- Distributed by: Shellac
- Release date: 28 September 2011
- Countries: France; Belgium
- Languages: French; English

Almayer's Folly (French: La Folie Almayer) is a 2011 drama film directed by Chantal Akerman and starring Stanislas Merhar, Aurora Marion and Marc Barbé. It is an adaptation of Joseph Conrad's 1895 debut novel Almayer's Folly, and tells the story of a Dutchman searching for pirate treasure in Malaysia. The setting has been relocated to the 1950s. The film was a coproduction between companies in France and Belgium. It received four Magritte Award nominations.

== Cast ==
- Stanislas Merhar as Almayer
- Marc Barbé as Captain Lingard
- Aurora Marion as Nina
- Zac Andrianasolo as Daïn
- Sakhna Oum as Zahira
- Solida Chan as Chen
- Yucheng Sun as Captain Tom Li
- Bunthang Khim as Ali

== Production ==
The film was initially under development for Akerman's Belgian company Paradise Films together with Paulo Branco's Alfama Films for a budget of 3,475,000 euro, with a filming start date set to March 2011. Production was eventually led by Patrick Quinet of France's Liaison Cinématographique together with Paradise Films and Artémis Productions. The project received 350,000 euro in advance from the French National Center of Cinematography and 465,000 euro from the Belgian French Community Film and Audiovisual Centre. In addition it was supported through pre-sales investment by Canal+ and CinéCinéma.

Principal photography took place in Cambodia. Filming started 10 November and ended 24 December 2010.

== Reception ==
Review aggregator Rotten Tomatoes reports that 87% out of 15 professional critics gave the film a positive review, with a rating average of 9.3/10. On Metacritic, the film has a weighted average score of 92 out of 100 based on 6 critic reviews, indicating "universal acclaim".
