= Aurora Marion =

Belgian stage and film actress (born 1985)

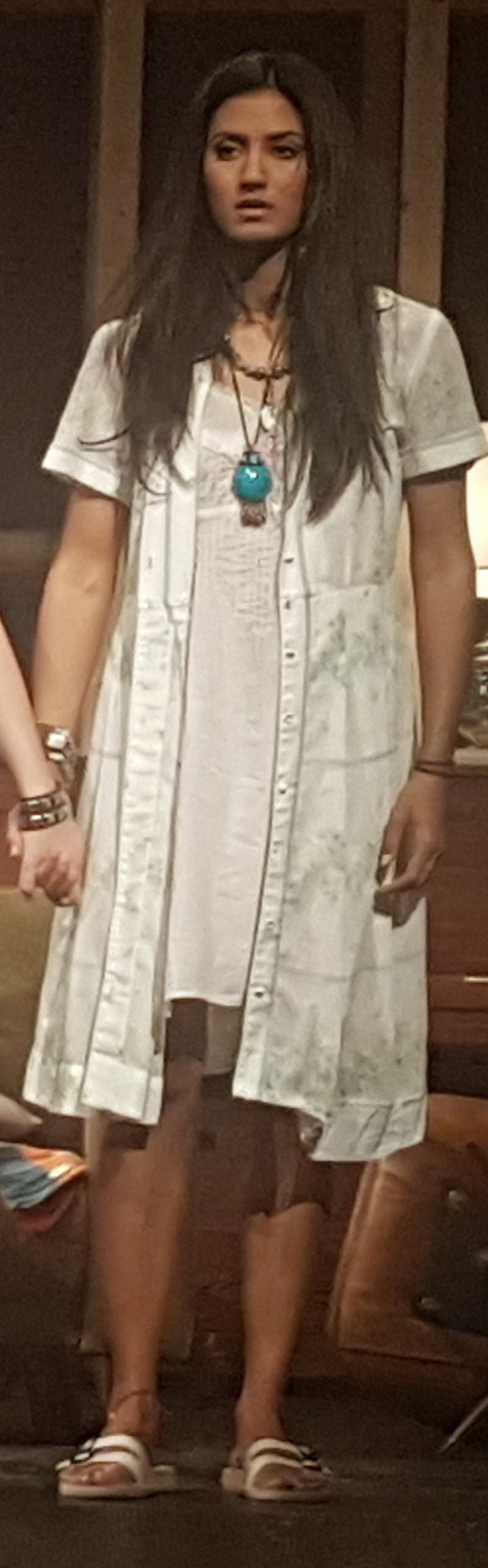
- Born: 22 December 1985 (age 40); Uccle, Belgium
- Occupations: Film and stage actress
- Years active: 2011–present

Aurora Marion (born 22 December 1985) is a Belgian-Rwandan and Greek actress. She is the daughter of the Greek actor Kostas Arzoglou and Belgian actress Estelle Marion. She began working in theatre after developing an interest in acting, before making her film debut in Almayer's Folly (2011), which earned her a Magritte Award nomination in the category of Most Promising Actress. The film was directed by Chantal Akerman and is an adaptation of Joseph Conrad's 1895 novel of the same name.

Marion later starred in Stephan Streker's film A Wedding (2016), which premiered at the 2016 Toronto International Film Festival. At the 8th Magritte Awards, the film received eight nominations and won two, including Best Supporting Actress for Marion. She portrayed Noor Inayat Khan in the BBC series Doctor Who.

== Selected filmography ==
Year	Title	Role	Notes
2011	Almayer's Folly	Nina	Nominated—Magritte Award for Most Promising Actress
2012	The Capsule	Woman	Short film
2016	The Airport	Jackie	
2016	A Wedding	Hina Kazim	Magritte Award for Best Supporting Actress
2017	Success Story	Girl	
2019	Back Held Hands	Minnale	
2020	Doctor Who	Noor Inayat Khan	Episode: "Spyfall, Part Two"
2023	Life's a Bitch	Greta	
