= Claude Barras =

Swiss director

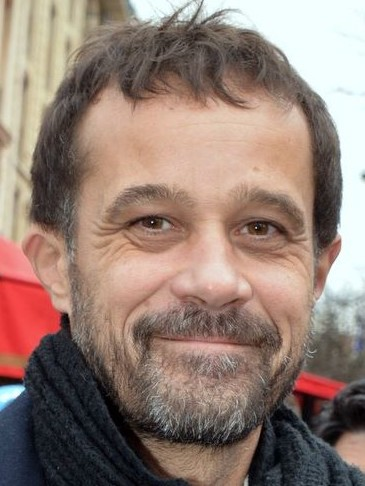
- Born: 1973 (age 52–53); Sierre, Switzerland
- Occupation: Filmmaker
- Years active: 2006–present

Claude Barras (born 1973) is a Swiss film director, producer, and writer.

== Filmography ==
In addition to directing, Barras has co-produced many of his films. He has also co-produced several other films, not by him. This includes La femme canon (2017), Birdz (2016), Imposter (2014), Un enfant commode (2013), and Monsieur l’assassin X (2012).

=== Feature films ===
Year	Title	Technique	Producer	Length	Notes
2016	My Life as a Courgette	stop-motion	Rita Productions / Blue Spirit Productions / Gebeka Films / KNM	66 minutes	
2024	Savages	stop-motion	Nadasdy Film / Haut et Court / Paniques!	80 minutes	
TBA	You're Not The One I Expected	stop-motion	Frane TV Distribution / Helium Films	TBA	Adapted from Ce N’est Pas Toi Que J’attendais by Fabien Toulmé

=== Short films ===
Year	Title	Technique	Producer	Length	Notes
2012	Chambre 69	stop-motion	Helium Films / RTS	3m	
2010	Zucchini	stop-motion	Helium Films / Rita Productions / RTS	3m	Pilot for My Life as a Courgette
2008	Land of the Heads	stop-motion	Helium Films / TSR / ONF / Animateka Lubjiana	5m	Co-directed with Cédric Louis; 2010 Audience Award – Slovenia, Australian International Film Festival 2009
2007	Sainte Barbe	stop-motion	Helium Films / TSR / ONF	8m	Co-directed with Cédric Louis
2007	Animatou	2D animation	Studio GDS / Schwizgebel / RTS Radio Télévision Suisse / Studio GDS / Luyet	6m	
2006	The Genie in a Ravioli Can	stop-motion	Helium Films / TSR	7m	
2005	Ice Floe	2D animation	Helium Films / TSR	6m35s	Co-directed with Cédric Louis
2002	Stigmates	2D animation	Atelier Zérodeux	3m30s	
1999	Casting Queen	3D animation	Ecal / Barrabas	2m45s	
1998	Mélanie	2D animation	Ecal / Barrabas	4m22s	

== Accolades ==
Year	Award	Category	Nominated work	Result	Ref.
2006	Animatou, International Animation Film Festival	Kodak Audience Prize, Best Short Film	The Genie in a Ravioli Can	Won	
2006	Australian International Film Festival	Golden Spotlight Award, Best Short Film	The Genie in a Ravioli Can	Won	
2006	Curtocircuíto	«Kodak 35 mm» Award for the Best Short Film shot on 35 mm	The Genie in a Ravioli Can	Won	
2006	Encounters Short Film and Animation Festival	New Talent Award	The Genie in a Ravioli Can	Won	
2006	Festival du Film Romand in Geneva	Special Mention	The Genie in a Ravioli Can	Won	
2006	Solothurn Film Festival	Audience Award SSA/Suissimage	The Genie in a Ravioli Can	Won	
2007	European Youth Film Festival of Flanders	Best Short Film	The Genie in a Ravioli Can	Won	
2015	Annecy International Animation Film Festival	Gan Foundation Aid for Distribution for a Work in Progress Award	My Life as a Courgette	Won	
2016	Angoulême Francophone Film Festival	Valois de Diamant	My Life as a Courgette	Won	
2016	Annecy International Animation Film Festival	Audience Award	My Life as a Courgette	Won	
2016	Annecy International Animation Film Festival	Cristal Award for Best Feature	My Life as a Courgette	Won	
2016	Cannes Film Festival	Directors' Fortnight	My Life as a Courgette	Nominated	
2016	Delémont-Hollywood	Prix Opale	My Life as a Courgette	Won	
2016	European Film Awards	Best Animated Feature Film	My Life as a Courgette	Won	
2016	Festival de l'écrit à l'écran	Audience Award	My Life as a Courgette	Won	
2016	Golden Globe Awards	Best Animated Feature Film	My Life as a Courgette	Nominated	
2016	International Young Audience Film Festival Ale Kino!	Teacher's Jury Prize	My Life as a Courgette	Special mention	
2016	Kinderfilmfestival/Institut Pitanga	Children's Jury Prize	My Life as a Courgette	Won	
2016	Lux Film Prize	Lux Prize	My Life as a Courgette	Nominated	
2016	Melbourne International Film Festival	Audience Award	My Life as a Courgette	Won	
2016	Monstra Lisboa Animated Film Festival	Audience Award	My Life as a Courgette	Won	
2016	Monstra Lisboa Animated Film Festival	Grand Prix	My Life as a Courgette	Won	
2016	San Sebastian International Film Festival	Audience Award for Best European Film	My Life as a Courgette	Won	
2016	Zurich Film Festival	Best Children's Film	My Life as a Courgette	Won	
2017	Academy Awards	Best Animated Feature	My Life as a Courgette	Nominated	
2017	Anifilm	Best Animated Feature Film for Children - International Competition	My Life as a Courgette	Won	
2017	César Awards	Best Animated Film	My Life as a Courgette	Won	
2017	Lumière Awards	Best Animated Film	My Life as a Courgette	Won	
2017	Prix Walo	Best Film Production	My Life as a Courgette	Won	
2017	Swiss Film Award	Best Fiction Film	My Life as a Courgette	Won	
2017	Trophées Francophones du Cinéma	Best Director	My Life as a Courgette	Won	
2017	Trophées Francophones du Cinéma	Best Screenplay	My Life as a Courgette	Won (Note: Awarded alongside Germano Zullo, Morgan Navarro, and Céline Sciamma.)	
2017	World Festival of Animated Films Zagreb	Mr. M – Feature Film Audience Award	My Life as a Courgette	Won	
2018	British Academy Film Awards	Best Animated Film	My Life as a Courgette	Nominated	
2024	Annecy International Animation Film Festival	Cristal Award for Best Feature	Savages	Nominated	
2024	Locarno Film Festival	Locarno Kids Award la Mobiliare	—N/a	Won	
