= Pauline Burlet =

Belgian actress

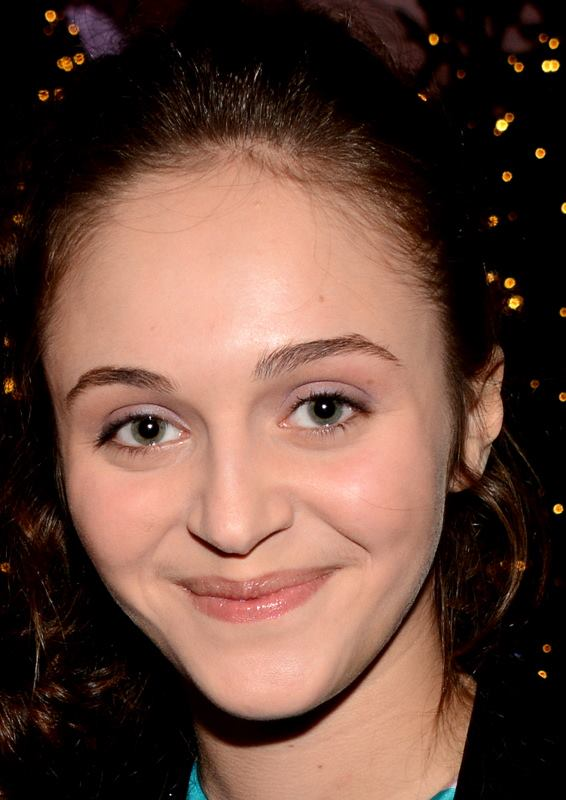
- Pauline Burlet in 2014
- Born: 9 April 1996 (age 29); Mons, Belgium
- Occupation: Actress
- Years active: 2007–present

Pauline Burlet (born 9 April 1996) is a Belgian actress, who starred as 'Lili Franchet' in the French TV series Résistance.

Her first major role was in the 2007 film, La Vie en rose, as a young Edith Piaf. Burlet won a Magritte Award in 2014 for "most promising actress" for her performance in The Past (Le Passé).

== Filmography ==
=== Film ===
- La Vie en rose (2007) as 10 years old Edith Piaf
- 2 Sœurs (2007) (Short film) as Alice
- Alessandro (2009) (Short film) as Sabrina
- Dead Man Talking (2012) as Sarah Raven
- The Past (2013) as Lucie
- The Connection (2014) as Lily Mariani
- Jailbirds (2015) as Jeanne
- Le Semeur (2017) as Violette

=== Television ===
- À tort ou à raison (2009–2011) (TV series) as Carole Scola
- Resistance (2014) (TV series) as Lili Franchet
- Road to Istanbul (2016) (TV movie) as Élodie
