= Mobile Home (film) =

- Directed by: François Pirot
- Written by: Marteen Loix; François Pirot; Jean-Benoît Ugeux
- Starring: Arthur Dupont; Guillaume Gouix; Jackie Berroyer
- Cinematography: Manuel Dacosse
- Edited by: Albertine Lastera
- Release dates: August 4, 2012 (Locarno Film Festival); September 22, 2012 (Belgium)
- Running time: 95 minutes
- Countries: Belgium; Luxembourg; France
- Language: French

Mobile Home is a 2012 Belgian comedy-drama film directed by François Pirot. It was written by Pirotand, Marteen Loix and Jean-Benoît Ugeux. It premiered on August 4, 2012, at the Locarno International Film Festival. The film was nominated for seven Magritte Awards, winning Most Promising Actress and Best Original Score.

== Cast ==
- Arthur Dupont as Simon
- Guillaume Gouix as Julien
- Jean-Paul Bonnaire as Luc
- Claudine Pelletier as Monique
- Jackie Berroyer as Jean-Marie
- Anne-Pascale Clairembourg as Sylvie
- Eugénie Anselin as Maya
- Catherine Salée as Valérie
- Arnaud Bronsart as Stéphane
- Gwen Berrou as Virginie
- Jean-François Wolff as Gérard
- Jérôme Varanfrain as Mathieu
