= One Night (2012 film) =

- Film poster
- Directed by: Lucas Belvaux
- Screenplay by: Lucas Belvaux
- Based on: Est-ce ainsi que les femmes meurent? by Didier Decoin
- Produced by: Yvan Attal; Patrick Quinet; Patrick Sobelman
- Starring: Yvan Attal; Sophie Quinton; Nicole Garcia
- Cinematography: Pierric Gantelmi d'Ille
- Edited by: Ludo Troch
- Music by: Arne Van Dongen
- Production companies: Agat Films & Cie
- Distributed by: Cinéart (Belgium) Diaphana Films (France)
- Release dates: 30 January 2012 (Rotterdam Film Festival); 14 March 2012 (Belgium & France)
- Running time: 104 minutes
- Countries: Belgium; France
- Language: French
- Budget: $7.6 million
- Box office: $1.3 million

One Night (French: 38 témoins), also known as 38 Witnesses, is a 2012 Belgian-French drama film directed by Lucas Belvaux. It was written by Belvaux based on Didier Decoin's novel Est-ce ainsi que les femmes meurent?. It premiered on 30 January 2012, at the International Film Festival Rotterdam. The film was nominated for seven Magritte Awards, winning Best Screenplay.

== Plot ==
When Louise Morvand returns from a business trip to China she discovers that a crime has been committed in her hometown. A woman has been murdered in the very street where Louise lives with her husband Pierre. Upon initial police investigation it appears that there were no witnesses to the crime, and Louise's neighbours seem to be strangely uninterested in finding the murderer. Haunted by a feeling of guilt, Pierre goes to the police station and admits that he heard screams and saw the attacked woman from the window on the night of the murder. Following his testimony at the police, Pierre is misunderstood by his wife and ostracized and harassed by his neighbours. A full investigation reveals that 38 people actually witnessed the crime, but none of them called police or did anything to help the victim. Journalist Sylvie Loriot is determined to reveal the truth to the public. The police reconstructs the crime with the help of the witnesses, and Louise leaves her husband.

== Technical sheet ==
- Title: 38 Witnesses
- Directed by: Lucas Belvaux
- Screenplay: Lucas Belvaux, based on Didier Decoin's novel Is this how women die?
- Director of photography: Pierric Gantelmi d'Ille
- Editing: Ludo Troch
- Music: Arne Van Dongen
- Producers: Patrick Sobelman, Patrick Quinet and Yvan Attal
- Production: France 3 Cinéma • Agat Films & Cie • RTBF
- SOFICA : Cinémage 5
- Cast: Diaphana
- Genre: drama
- Budget: 7,100,000 euros2
- Box office: 270,549
- Country:France • Belgium
- Running time: 1 hour 44 minutes

== Cast ==
- Yvan Attal as captain Pierre Morvand
- Sophie Quinton as Louise Morvand (Pierre's wife)
- Nicole Garcia as journalist Sylvie Loriot
- François Feroleto as Léonard
- Natacha Régnier as Anne
- Patrick Descamps as Petrini
- Didier Sandre as Lacourt
- Pierre Rochefort as the young policeman
