= Casimir Liberski =

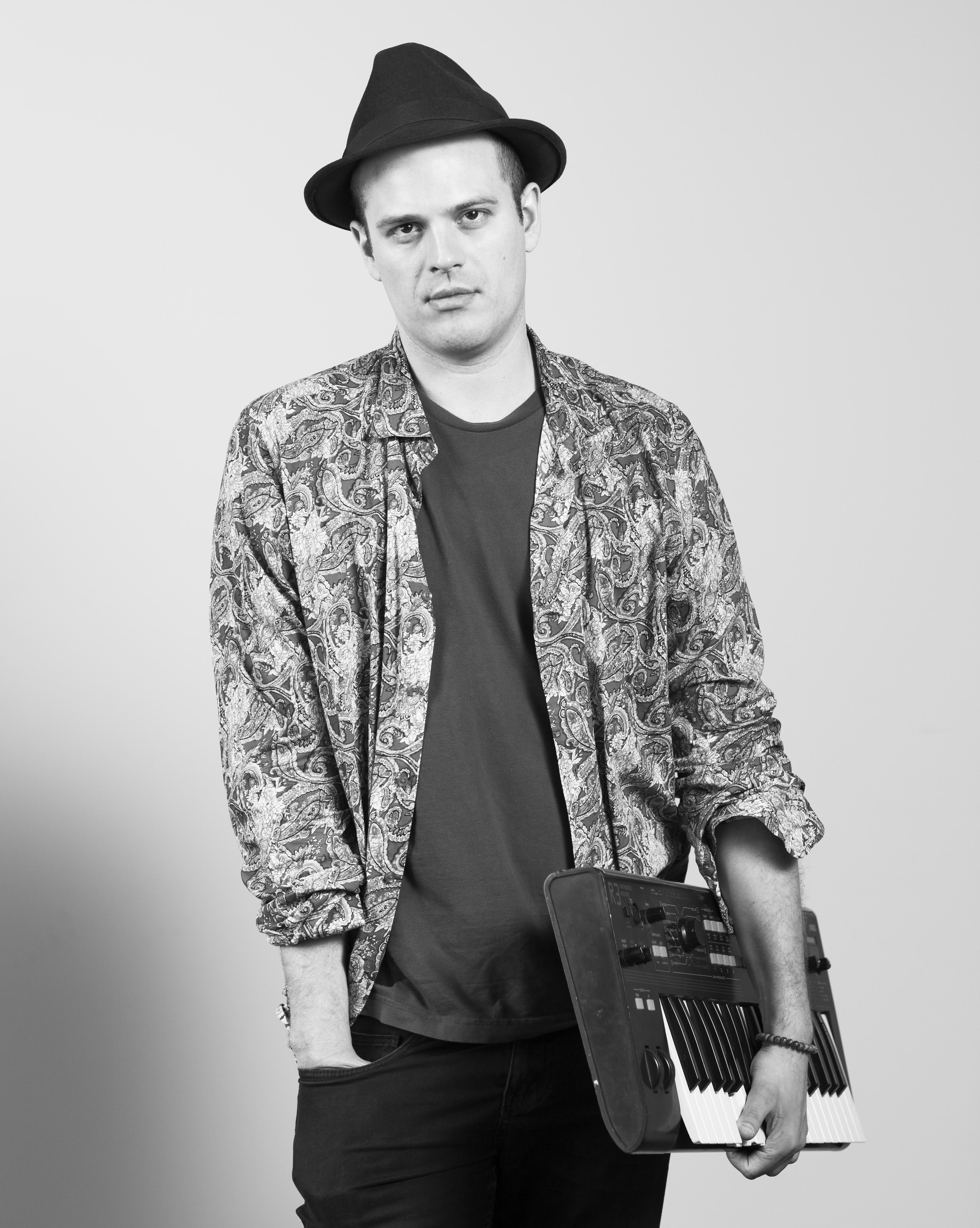

Background information
- Born: 1988 (age 37–38)
- Origin: Brussels, Belgium
- Genres: Jazz
- Occupations: Pianist, composer
- Years active: 2003 – present
- Labels: Dalang! Records, Igloo, Ropeadope
- Website: www.casimirliberski.com

Casimir Liberski (born 1988) is a pianist and composer.

He attended Berklee College of Music from 2006. Around 2010, he appeared on Charnett Moffett's album Treasure. Liberski composed the music for the 2014 film Tokyo Fiancée.

== Selected discography ==
- 2008: "Evanescences (featuring Tyshawn Sorey and Thomas Morgan)" (Dalang!Records)
- 2009: Dedications (Jazz Revelation Records)
- 2010: Treasure (Motéma Music)
- 2012: Defense Mechanism (by Louis de Mieulle)
- 2012: "The Caveless Wolf - Casimir Liberski Trio" (Dalang!Records)
- 2012: "Atomic Rabbit" (Dalang!Records)
- 2014: "Tokyo Fiancée" (Dalang!Records)
- 2015: Stars, Plants & Bugs (by Louis de Mieulle)
- 2016: Ukiyo (by Kaoru Tanaka)
- 2016: Lagune (by JF Foliez)
- 2017: Middle of Somewhere
- 2019: Cosmic Liberty
