= Julie Brenta =

Belgian sound engineer and film editor

Julie Brenta is a Belgian sound engineer and film editor. She has worked on over fifty films since 1995.

Her credits include Murderous Maids (2000), L'Enfant (2005), Lorna's Silence (2008), The Nun (2013), Abuse of Weakness (2014), All About Them (2015), The Wakhan Front (2015), and Daguerrotype (2016). Her work on The Minister (2011) earned her a César Award and a Magritte Award for Best Sound. She also received two Magritte Awards for Best Editing for Keeper (2015) and Our Struggles (2018).
