= Festival International du Film Francophone de Namur =

Annual film festival held in Namur, Belgium

- Location: Namur, Belgium
- Founded: 1986; 40 years ago
- Awards: Bayard d'Or
- Language: French
- Website: www.fiff.be

The Festival International du Film Francophone de Namur (FIFF), formerly Festival cinématographique de Wallonie, is a festival dedicated to French-speaking films from around the world, held in Namur, Belgium.

== History ==
The festival was established in 1986 as the Festival cinématographique de Wallonie by Jean-Louis Close, André Ceuterick, René Fauvel, and Luc and Raoul Hemelaer. Its aim was to present a selection of films from the Francophone world. The Festival de Wallonie thus took up the role previously played by the Festival international du film et d'échanges francophones (FIFEF). FIFEF sought to demonstrate, on the one hand, that Anglo-American cinema was not the only vehicle of the seventh art and, on the other, that French-language cinema was not confined to France.

Beginning in 1988, the International Organisation of La Francophonie officially supported the festival. FESPACO subsequently began establishing closer ties with the FIFF, leading to the twinning of the two festivals. In 1989, the organization adopted the name Festival International du Film Francophone. After being recognized by the International Federation of Film Producers Associations as a specialized competitive festival, it gained the right to award the Bayard d'Or prizes for Best Film, Best Actor, Best Actress, and Special Jury Prize.

== See also ==
- Organisation internationale de la Francophonie
