= Académie André Delvaux =

Belgian professional organisation for cinema

The Académie André Delvaux is a Belgian professional organisation dedicated to the promotion and development of Belgian cinema. Founded in 2010, it is responsible for the annual Magritte Awards, Belgium's principal film awards.

== History ==
The Académie André Delvaux was founded by two associations: the Francophone Film Producers Association (UPFF), represented by Patrick Quinet, Marion Hänsel, Olivier Bronckart and Philippe Kauffmann, and the association of authors Pro Spère, represented by Luc Jabon, André Buytaers, Benoît Coppée and Alok Nandi. Its name was chosen in honour of the Belgian film director André Delvaux (1926–2002). The academy aims to promote the Belgian film industry around the globe. Its main task is to organize the Magritte Awards, replacing the Joseph Plateau Award, awarded from 1985 to 2006. Charly Herscovici, who created the foundation Magritte, allowed the academy to use the name of René Magritte for the awards.

The board of directors of the academy is composed of Luc Jabon (Pro Spère), Patrick Quinet (Union des producteurs de films francophones), Frédéric Delcor (Fédération Wallonie-Bruxelles, Centre du Cinéma et de l'Audiovisuel), Nicole Gillet (Festival International du Film Francophone de Namur), Philippe Reynaert (Wallimage), Philippe Logie (BeTV), Jaco Van Dormael and Dan Cukier.

The 1st Magritte Awards ceremony took place on 5 February 2011 at the Square in the historic site of Mont des Arts, Brussels. Twenty categories were presented, honoring artists, directors and other personalities of the filmmaking industry of the time for their works during the 2009–2010 period.
