= Magritte Award for Best First Feature Film =

Belgian film award

- Presented by: Académie André Delvaux
- First award: 2013
- Currently held by: Kika (2025)
- Website: lesmagritteducinema.com

The Magritte Award for Best First Feature Film (French: Magritte du meilleur premier film) is an award presented annually by the Académie André Delvaux. It is one of the Magritte Awards, which were established to recognize excellence in Belgian cinematic achievements.

It was introduced in 2013 as an audience award. However, its first winner Dead Man Talking was announced during the 66th Cannes Film Festival, three months later the 3rd Magritte Awards ceremony. In 2016, the Magritte Award for Best First Feature Film became a merit category. As of the 2026 ceremony, Kika is the most recent winner in this category.

== Winners and nominees ==
In the list below, winners are listed first in the colored row, followed by the other nominees.

=== 2010s ===
Year	English title	Original title	Director(s)
2012 (3rd)	Dead Man Talking		Patrick Ridremont
2012 (3rd)	Mobile Home		François Pirot
2012 (3rd)	Torpedo		Matthieu Donck
2013 (4th)	A Song for My Mother	Une chanson pour ma mère	Joël Franka
2013 (4th)	In The Bag of Flour	Le Sac de farine	Kadija Leclère
2013 (4th)	BXL/USA		Gaëtan Bevernaege
2014 (5th)	I'll Bury You	Je te survivrai	Sylvestre Sbille
2014 (5th)	Marbie, star de Couillu-les-Deux-Églises		Dominique Smeets
2014 (5th)	Vertigo of Possibilities	Le Vertige des possibles	Vivianne Perelmuter
2015 (6th)	All Cats Are Grey	Tous les chats sont gris	Savina Dellicour
2015 (6th)	Next Year	L'Année prochaine	Vania Leturcq
2015 (6th)	Prejudice	Préjudice	Antoine Cuypers
2016 (7th)	Keeper		Guillaume Senez
2016 (7th)	Death by Death	Je me tue à le dire	Xavier Seron
2016 (7th)	Parasol		Valéry Rosier
2017 (8th)	Don't Tell Her	Faut pas lui dire	Solange Cicurel
2017 (8th)	Even Lovers Get the Blues		Laurent Micheli
2017 (8th)	Sonar		Jean-Philippe Martin
2017 (8th)	Spit 'n' Split		Jérôme Vandewattyne
2017 (8th)	Staying in the Woods	Je suis resté dans les bois	Michaël Bier, Erika Sainte and Vincent Solheid
2018 (9th)	Bitter Flowers		Olivier Meys
2018 (9th)	Above the Law	Tueurs	François Troukens and Jean-François Hensgens
2018 (9th)	The Benefit of the Doubt	Une Part d'ombre	Samuel Tilman
2018 (9th)	The Faithful Son	La Part sauvage	Guérin Van de Vorst
2019 (10th)	Our Mothers	Nuestras madres	César Díaz
2019 (10th)	Alone at My Wedding	Seule à mon mariage	Marta Bergman
2019 (10th)	Escapada		Sarah Hirtt
2019 (10th)	For a Happy Life	Pour vivre heureux	Dimitri Linder and Salima Sarah Glamine
2019 (10th)	Girls on the Run	Cavale	Virginie Gourmel

=== 2020s ===
Year	English title	Original title	Director(s)
2020/21 (11th)	Playground	Un monde	Laura Wandel
2020/21 (11th)	Jumbo		Zoé Wittock
2020/21 (11th)	Madly in Life	Une vie démente	Ann Sirot and Raphaël Balboni
2020/21 (11th)	Mother Schmuckers	Fils de plouc	Harpo Guit and Lenny Guit
2022 (12th)	Zero Fucks Given	Rien à foutre	Emmanuel Marre and Julie Lecoustre
2022 (12th)	Aya		Simon Coulibaly Gillard
2022 (12th)	The Hive	La Ruche	Christophe Hermans
2022 (12th)	Yuku and the Flower of the Himalayas	Yuku et la fleur de l'Himalaya	Arnaud Demuynck and Rémi Durin
2023 (13th)	Love According to Dalva	Dalva	Emmanuelle Nicot
2023 (13th)	The Lost Boys	Le Paradis	Zeno Graton
2023 (13th)	Omen	Augure	Baloji
2023 (13th)	Time Out	Temps mort	Ève Duchemin
2024 (14th)	Night Call	La nuit se traîne	Michiel Blanchart
2024 (14th)	Camping du lac		Éléonore Saintagnan
2024 (14th)	It's Raining in the House	Il pleut dans la maison	Paloma Sermon-Daï
2024 (14th)	Through the Night	Quitter la nuit	Delphine Girard
2025; 15th)	Kika		Alexe Poukine
2025; 15th)	The Virgin and Child	La vierge à l'enfant	Berivan Binevsa
2025; 15th)	Vitrival – The Most Beautiful Village in the World	Vitrival	Noëlle Bastin and Baptiste Bogaert
2025; 15th)	We Believe You	On vous croit	Arnaud Dufeys and Charlotte Devillers
