= Magritte Award for Best Cinematography =

Belgian film award

- Presented by: Académie André Delvaux
- First award: 2011
- Currently held by: Manu Dacosse, Reflection in a Dead Diamond (2025)
- Website: lesmagritteducinema.com

The Magritte Award for Best Cinematography (French: Magritte de la meilleure image) is an award presented annually by the Académie André Delvaux. It is one of the Magritte Awards, which were established to recognize excellence in Belgian cinematic achievements.

The 1st Magritte Awards ceremony was held in 2011 with Christophe Beaucarne receiving the award for his work in Mr. Nobody. As of the 2026 ceremony, Manu Dacosse is the most recent winner in this category for his work in Reflection in a Dead Diamond.

== Winners and nominees ==
In the list below, winners are listed first in the colored row, followed by the other nominees.

=== 2010s ===
Year	Cinematographer(s)	English title	Original title
2010 (1st)	Christophe Beaucarne	Mr. Nobody	
2010 (1st)	Manuel Dacosse	Amer	
2010 (1st)	Alain Marcoen	The Boat Race	La Régate
2011 (2nd)	Jean-Paul De Zaeytijd	The Giants	Les Géants
2011 (2nd)	Nicolas Karakatsanis	Bullhead	Rundskop
2011 (2nd)	Alain Marcoen	The Kid with a Bike	Le Gamin au vélo
2012 (3rd)	Hichame Alaouié	Last Winter	L'Hiver dernier
2012 (3rd)	Danny Elsen	Dead Man Talking	
2012 (3rd)	Remon Fromont	Almayer's Folly	La Folie Almayer
2013 (4th)	Hichame Alaouié	Horses of God	Les Chevaux de Dieu
2013 (4th)	Christophe Beaucarne	Mood Indigo	L'Écume des jours
2013 (4th)	Virginie Saint-Martin	Tango libre	
2014 (5th)	Manuel Dacosse	The Strange Color of Your Body's Tears	L'Étrange Couleur des larmes de ton corps
2014 (5th)	Hichame Alaouié	Tokyo Fiancée	
2014 (5th)	Philippe Guilbert and Virginie Saint-Martin	The Taste of Blueberries	Le Goût des myrtilles
2015 (6th)	Manuel Dacosse	Alleluia	
2015 (6th)	Christophe Beaucarne	The Brand New Testament	Le Tout Nouveau Testament
2015 (6th)	Frédéric Noirhomme	Prejudice	
2016 (7th)	Olivier Boonjing	Parasol	
2016 (7th)	Manuel Dacosse	Evolution	
2016 (7th)	Benoît Debie	The Dancer	La Danseuse
2016 (7th)	Jean-Paul De Zaeytijd	The First, the Last	Les Premiers, les Derniers
2017 (8th)	Virginie Surdej	Insyriated	
2017 (8th)	Ruben Impens	Raw	Grave
2017 (8th)	Juliette Van Dormael	Angel	Mon ange
2018 (9th)	Manuel Dacosse	Let the Corpses Tan	Laissez bronzer les cadavres
2018 (9th)	Jean-François Hensgens	Above the Law	Tueurs
2018 (9th)	Frank van den Eeden	Girl	
2019 (10th)	Hichame Alaouié	Mothers' Instinct	Duelles
2019 (10th)	Virginie Surdej	Our Mothers	Nuestras madres
2019 (10th)	Benoît Debie	The Sisters Brothers	

=== 2020s ===
Year	Cinematographer(s)	English title	Original title
2020/21 (11th)	Ruben Impens	Titane	
2020/21 (11th)	Manuel Dacosse	Adoration	
2020/21 (11th)	Frédéric Noirhomme	Playground	Un monde
2022 (12th)	Frank van den Eeden	Close	
2022 (12th)	Manuel Dacosse	Inexorable	
2022 (12th)	Olivier Boonjing	Zero Fucks Given	Rien à foutre
2023 (13th)	Joachim Philippe	Omen	Augure
2023 (13th)	Caroline Guimbal	Love According to Dalva	Dalva
2023 (13th)	Florian Berutti	The Other Laurens	L'Autre Laurens
2024 (14th)	Sylvestre Vannoorenberghe	Night Call	La nuit se traîne
2024 (14th)	Frédéric Noirhomme	It's Raining in the House	Il pleut dans la maison
2024 (14th)	Juliette Van Dormael	Through the Night	Quitter la nuit
