= Magritte Award for Best Film =

Belgian film award

- Presented by: Académie André Delvaux
- First award: 2011
- Currently held by: Love According to Dalva (2023)
- Website: lesmagritteducinema.com

The Magritte Award for Best Film (French: Magritte du meilleur film) is an award presented annually by the Académie André Delvaux. It is one of the Magritte Awards, which were established to recognize excellence in Belgian cinematic achievements. The 1st Magritte Awards ceremony was held in 2011 with Mr. Nobody receiving the award for Best Film. As of the 2024 ceremony, Love According to Dalva is the most recent winner.

== Winners and nominees ==
In the list below, winners are listed first in the colored row, followed by the other nominees.

=== 2010s ===
Year	English title	Original title	Director(s)
2010 (1st)	Mr. Nobody		Jaco Van Dormael
2010 (1st)	Amer		Hélène Cattet and Bruno Forzani
2010 (1st)	The Barons	Les Barons	Nabil Ben Yadir
2010 (1st)	Illegal	Illégal	Olivier Masset-Depasse
2011 (2nd)	The Giants	Les Géants	Bouli Lanners
2011 (2nd)	Beyond the Steppes		Vanja d'Alcantara
2011 (2nd)	The Fairy	La Fée	Dominique Abel and Fiona Gordon
2011 (2nd)	The Kid with a Bike	Le Gamin au vélo	Jean-Pierre and Luc Dardenne
2012 (3rd)	Our Children	À perdre la raison	Joachim Lafosse
2012 (3rd)	Dead Man Talking		Patrick Ridremont
2012 (3rd)	Mobile Home		François Pirot
2012 (3rd)	One Night	38 témoins	Lucas Belvaux
2013 (4th)	Ernest & Celestine	Ernest et Célestine	Stéphane Aubier, Vincent Patar, Benjamin Renner
2013 (4th)	In the Name of the Son	Au nom du fils	Vincent Lannoo
2013 (4th)	Kinshasa Kids		Marc-Henri Wajnberg
2013 (4th)	Tango libre		Frédéric Fonteyne
2013 (4th)	The World Belongs to Us	Le Monde nous appartient	Stephan Streker
2014 (5th)	Two Days, One Night	Deux jours, une nuit	Jean-Pierre and Luc Dardenne
2014 (5th)	Henri		Yolande Moreau
2014 (5th)	The Marchers	La Marche	Nabil Ben Yadir
2014 (5th)	Not My Type	Pas son genre	Lucas Belvaux
2014 (5th)	Scouting for Zebras	Les Rayures du zèbre	Benoît Mariage
2015 (6th)	The Brand New Testament	Le Tout Nouveau Testament	Jaco Van Dormael
2015 (6th)	All Cats Are Grey	Tous les chats sont gris	Savina Dellicour
2015 (6th)	I'm Dead But I Have Friends	Je suis mort mais j'ai des amis	Guillaume Malandrin and Stéphane Malandrin
2015 (6th)	Melody		Bernard Bellefroid
2015 (6th)	Prejudice	Préjudice	Antoine Cuypers
2016 (7th)	The First, the Last	Les Premiers, les Derniers	Bouli Lanners
2016 (7th)	After Love	L'Économie du couple	Joachim Lafosse
2016 (7th)	Death by Death	Je me tue à le dire	Xavier Seron
2016 (7th)	Keeper		Guillaume Senez
2016 (7th)	Parasol		Valéry Rosier
2017 (8th)	Insyriated		Philippe Van Leeuw
2017 (8th)	Blind Spot	Dode Hoek	Nabil Ben Yadir
2017 (8th)	Lost in Paris	Paris pieds nus	Dominique Abel and Fiona Gordon
2017 (8th)	This Is Our Land	Chez nous	Lucas Belvaux
2017 (8th)	A Wedding	Noces	Stephan Streker
2018 (9th)	Our Struggles	Nos batailles	Guillaume Senez
2018 (9th)	Above the Law	Tueurs	François Troukens and Jean-François Hensgens
2018 (9th)	Bitter Flowers		Olivier Meys
2018 (9th)	Mon Ket		François Damiens
2018 (9th)	Let the Corpses Tan	Laissez bronzer les cadavres	Hélène Cattet and Bruno Forzani
2019 (10th)	Mothers' Instinct	Duelles	Olivier Masset-Depasse
2019 (10th)	Alone at My Wedding	Seule à mon mariage	Marta Bergman
2019 (10th)	Lola	Lola vers la mer	Laurent Micheli
2019 (10th)	Our Mothers	Nuestras madres	César Díaz
2019 (10th)	Young Ahmed	Le Jeune Ahmed	Jean-Pierre and Luc Dardenne

=== 2020s ===
Year	English title	Original title	Director(s)
2020/21 (11th)	Madly in Life	Une vie démente	Ann Sirot and Raphaël Balboni
2020/21 (11th)	Adoration		Fabrice Du Welz
2020/21 (11th)	Playground	Un monde	Laura Wandel
2020/21 (11th)	The Restless	Les Intranquilles	Joachim Lafosse
2020/21 (11th)	Working Girls	Filles de joie	Frédéric Fonteyne and Anne Paulicevich
2022 (12th)	Nobody Has to Know		Bouli Lanners
2022 (12th)	Animals		Nabil Ben Yadir
2022 (12th)	The Hive	La Ruche	Christophe Hermans
2022 (12th)	Tori and Lokita	Tori et Lokita	Jean-Pierre Dardenne and Luc Dardenne
2022 (12th)	Zero Fucks Given	Rien à foutre	Emmanuel Marre and Julie Lecoustre
2023 (13th)	Love According to Dalva	Dalva	Emmanuelle Nicot
2023 (13th)	The Lost Boys	Le Paradis	Zeno Graton
2023 (13th)	Omen	Augure	Baloji
2023 (13th)	The Experience of Love	Le Syndrome des amours passées	Ann Sirot and Raphaël Balboni
2023 (13th)	Time Out	Temps mort	Eve Duchemin
2024 (14th)	Night Call	La nuit se traîne	Michiel Blanchart
2024 (14th)	Amal		Jawad Rhalib
2024 (14th)	It's Raining in the House	Il pleut dans la maison	Paloma Sermon-Daï
2024 (14th)	A Missing Part	Une part manquante	Guillaume Senez
2024 (14th)	Through the Night	Quitter la nuit	Delphine Girard
2025 (15th)	We Believe You	On vous croit	Arnaud Dufeys and Charlotte Devillers
2025 (15th)	Young Mothers	Jeunes Mères	Jean-Pierre and Luc Dardenne
2025 (15th)	Kika		Alexe Poukine
2025 (15th)	Adam's Interest	L'Intérêt d'Adam	Laura Wandel
2025 (15th)	Maldoror		Fabrice Du Welz
