= Melody (2014 film) =

- Directed by: Bernard Bellefroid
- Written by: Bernard Bellefroid; Carine Zimmerlin
- Produced by: Patrick Quinet; Claude Waringo
- Cinematography: David Williamson
- Edited by: Jean-Luc Simon
- Music by: Frédéric Vercheval
- Release dates: August 23, 2014 (FFA); May 6, 2015
- Running time: 90 minutes
- Countries: Belgium; Luxembourg; France
- Language: French

Melody is a 2014 Belgian drama film directed by Bernard Bellefroid. It was written by Bellefroid and Carine Zimmerlin. It was nominated for four Magritte Awards, including Best Film and Best Director for Bellefroid.

== Cast ==
- Rachael Blake as Emily
- Lucie Debay as Melody
- Don Gallagher as Gary
- Laure Roldan as Marion
- Clive Hayward as Norman
- Catherine Salée as Catherine
- Lana Macanovic as Doctor Sirenko
- Julie Maes as Coleen
- Larisa Faber as Vendeuse Layette
- Janine Horsburgh as Prof. Fostel
- Julian Nest as Willis
- Jules Werner as Dr. Helwitt
