= Mon Ket =

- Film poster
- Directed by: François Damiens
- Written by: François Damiens; Benoît Mariage
- Produced by: Hugo Sélignac; Vincent Mazel; Patrick Quinet; Chi-Fou-Mi Productions
- Release date: 30 May 2018
- Running time: 89 minutes
- Countries: Belgium; France
- Language: French
- Box office: $2.1 million

Mon Ket, also known as Dany, is a 2018 Belgian drama film directed by François Damiens in his directorial debut. It was written by Damiens with Benoît Mariage. It was screened at the 2018 CPH PIX Film Festival. It received three nominations at the 9th Magritte Awards in the categories of Best Film, Best Actor for François Damiens, and Most Promising Actor for Matteo Salamone.

In France, the film finished third at the box office in its opening weekend, behind Solo: A Star Wars Story and Deadpool 2.

== Cast ==
- François Damiens as Daniel "Dany" Versavel
- Matteo Salamone as Sullivan Versavel
- Tatiana Rojo as Patience
- Christian Brahy as the godfather
- Nancy Sluse as Nancy
