= Night Call (film) =

2024 film directed by Michiel Blanchart

- Theatrical release poster
- French: La nuit se traîne
- Directed by: Michiel Blanchart
- Screenplay by: Michiel Blanchart; Gilles Marchand
- Produced by: Michaël Goldberg; Boris Van Gils
- Starring: Jonathan Feltre; Natacha Krief; Jonas Bloquet; Thomas Mustin; Romain Duris
- Cinematography: Sylvestre Vannoorenberghe
- Edited by: Matthieu Jamet-Louis
- Music by: Tanguy Destable
- Production companies: Boucan Productions; Quad Films
- Distributed by: Lumière (Belgium); Gaumont (France)
- Release dates: 18 June 2024 (Biarritz Film Festival); 28 August 2024 (France); 4 September 2024 (Belgium)
- Running time: 97 minutes
- Countries: Belgium; France
- Language: French
- Box office: $679,409

Night Call (French: La nuit se traîne) is a 2024 action thriller film directed by Michiel Blanchart in his feature directorial debut, from a screenplay he co-wrote with Gilles Marchand. Set over the course of a night amid a Black Lives Matter protest in Belgium, a young locksmith is called for nocturnal assignment that plunges him into danger. It stars Jonathan Feltre, Natacha Krief, Jonas Bloquet, Thomas Mustin, and Romain Duris. The film is an international co-production between Belgium and France.

Night Call had its world premiere as the opening film in International Competition at the Biarritz Film Festival - Nouvelles Vagues on 18 June 2024, where it won the Audience Award. It was released theatrically in France by Gaumont on 28 August 2024, and in Belgium by Lumière on 4 September 2024. It received eleven nominations at the 14th Magritte Awards, winning ten, including Best Film, Best First Feature Film, and Best Director for Blanchart, holding the record for the most Magritte Awards won by a single film.

== Cast ==
- Jonathan Feltre as Mady
- Natacha Krief as Claire
- Jonas Bloquet as Theo
- Romain Duris as Yannick
- Thomas Mustin as Remy
- Sam Louwyck as Greg
- Nabill Mallat as Will
- Claire Bodson as Gina
- Graham Guit as Abel
- Marco Maas as Sam

== Production ==
Night Call marks the directorial debut of Belgian filmmaker Michiel Blanchart, who wrote the screenplay in collaboration with French filmmaker Gilles Marchand.

A co-production between Belgium and France, the film was produced by Michaël Goldberg for Boucan Productions and Boris Van Gils for Formosa, with co-production by Margaux Marciano and Nicolas Duval Adassovsky for Quad. Additional co-producers include Gaumont, France 3 Cinéma, RTL, VOO, BeTV, and Proximus. The production was also supported by Canal+ and the Centre du Cinéma et de l'Audiovisuel de la Fédération Wallonie-Bruxelles, and Eurimages.

=== Filming ===
Principal photography took place in Brussels and Molenbeek-Saint-Jean, Belgium for 35 days between March and April 2023.

== Release ==
Night Call was the opening film at the Biarritz Film Festival - Nouvelles Vagues in Biarritz, France on 18 June 2024, where it had its world premiere in the International Competition section.

The film was released theatrically in France by Gaumont on 28 August 2024, and was released in Belgium by Lumière on 4 September 2024.

In May 2024, Magnet Releasing acquired North American distribution rights to the film.

== Reception ==
=== Box office ===
In Belgium, Night Call surpassed 30,000 admissions, making it one of the most-watched Belgian films of 2024. Romain Pirard from Moustique magazine considered it a notable performance compared to the previous cinematic season in the country, citing the top three Belgian films of 2023—Omen (14,270 admissions), Love According to Dalva (11,678 admissions), and The Jolly Forgers (10,864 admissions)—all of which recorded lower numbers. Pirard also noted that Night Call's strong reception demonstrates the potential of national productions from Belgium to attract a wide audience.

=== Critical response ===
Night Call received positive reviews from critics. The review aggregator website AlloCiné assigned the film a weighted average score of 3.4 out of 5, based on 24 critics. On the review aggregator website Rotten Tomatoes, 82% of 34 critics' reviews are positive, with an average rating of 7.2/10. The website's consensus reads: "A dark, electrifying ride that rarely lets up, Night Call elevates its familiar premise through Michiel Blanchart's assured direction, propulsive pacing, and inventive action." Metacritic, which uses a weighted average, assigned the film a score of 67 out of 100, based on 10 critics, indicating "generally favorable" reviews.

Ben Gibbons from Screen Rant gave it four stars out of five, praising the film for imbuing a typical action-thriller premise with creativity and deeper meaning. He remarked, "It's not a movie about spies and highly skilled fighters; it's a story about a dark and occasionally terrifying world." Murtada Elfadl from Variety stated that the film not only delivers an entertaining action adventure but introduces a director who brings a modern spin to the genre, addressing topical issues and distinguishing itself from typical action fare.

== Accolades ==
Award	Date of ceremony	Category	Recipient(s)	Result	Ref.
Belgian Film Critics Association	13 December 2024	Best Film		Won	
Biarritz Film Festival - Nouvelles Vagues	22 June 2024	Grand Prix		Nominated	
Biarritz Film Festival - Nouvelles Vagues	22 June 2024	Audience Award		Won	
Magritte Awards	22 February 2025	Best Film		Won	
Magritte Awards	22 February 2025	Best Director	Michiel Blanchart	Won	
Magritte Awards	22 February 2025	Best Screenplay	Michiel Blanchart	Won	
Magritte Awards	22 February 2025	Best Supporting Actor	Jonas Bloquet	Won	
Magritte Awards	22 February 2025	Best Supporting Actor	Thomas Mustin	Nominated	
Magritte Awards	22 February 2025	Best First Feature Film		Won	
Magritte Awards	22 February 2025	Best Cinematography	Sylvestre Vannoorenberghe	Won	
Magritte Awards	22 February 2025	Best Sound	David Vranken, David Gillain, Joey Van Impe, Thibaud Rie, Fabrice Grizard, Antoine Wattier, and Vincent Gregorio	Won	
Magritte Awards	22 February 2025	Best Production Design	Catherine Cosme	Won	
Magritte Awards	22 February 2025	Best Costume Design	Isabel Van Renterghem	Won	
Magritte Awards	22 February 2025	Best Editing	Matthieu Jamet-Louis	Won	
