= Zero Fucks Given =

2021 film by Emmanuel Marre and Julie Lecoustre

- French theatrical release poster
- French: Rien à foutre
- Directed by: Emmanuel Marre; Julie Lecoustre
- Written by: Emmanuel Marre; Julie Lecoustre; Mariette Désert
- Produced by: François-Pierre Clavel; Benoit Roland
- Starring: Adèle Exarchopoulos
- Cinematography: Olivier Boonjing
- Edited by: Nicolas Rumpl
- Production companies: Wrong Men North; Kidam
- Distributed by: Condor (France); Cinéart (Belgium)
- Release dates: 11 July 2021 (Cannes); 2 March 2022 (France); 16 March 2022 (Belgium)
- Running time: 115 minutes
- Countries: France; Belgium
- Languages: French; English
- Budget: €2 million; (est. $2.1 million)
- Box office: $1 million

Zero Fucks Given (French: Rien à foutre) is a 2021 comedy-drama film directed by Emmanuel Marre and Julie Lecoustre. The film stars Adèle Exarchopoulos. It screened in the Critics' Week section at the 74th Cannes Film Festival on 11 July 2021. It was released in France on 2 March 2022.

== Plot ==
Cassandre is a 26-year-old flight attendant for a low-cost carrier based in Lanzarote. With little thought to her future and no desire to establish meaningful connections, she lives day-to-day, drifting through work, living together with the staff on call, partying in nightclubs, and having brief, mediocre encounters with strangers from dating apps. Though she is intentionally distant and aloof from most people, treating her well-meaning and inviting roommates with the same cordial distance she treats passengers, she does reveal a recent tragedy to a co-worker: her mother died in a car accident, and she subsequently left her father, sister, and family business in Belgium behind to avoid facing the reality of her loss and grief.

Cassandre is highly committed to her job and tolerates her pushy, micro-managing boss, and despite her relaxed attitude toward her goals, she constantly exceeds her sales quotas and one day hopes to move to a better airline with better destinations. Eventually, Cassandre learns that her contract is expiring. Though she has no desire to be promoted or have further responsibility, the only available positions require her to train to become a cabin manager. Afterwards, her cell phone carrier's customer service department calls her after noticing that most of her data is used abroad and suggests that she upgrade to an international plan. Since Cassandre's mother owned the cell phone plan, upgrading forces her to terminate her mother's phone line in order to establish a new plan, something that briefly breaks her stoic composure as she is forced to acknowledge and be reminded of her mother's death.

Cassandre applies what she's learned from her training to her new role as a cabin manager. She experiences gradual, conscious improvements with her work ethic, her relationships with her co-workers, and her connection with her passengers. This puts her at odds with her manager, who punishes her for rating her crew too highly during self-assessments during subpar sales periods, yet also blaming her when she explains unavoidable, mitigating circumstances. Later, Cassandre, recalling her training to treat passengers with empathy, purchases a drink for a distressed passenger who is leaving her country and family for the first time to undergo major surgery. As this goes against company policy, her manager puts her on indefinite leave.

Essentially laid off, Cassandre finally returns home to Huy, to her father and sister, who have little regard for her line of work. She is disconnected from her old friends, who question the appeal of her lifestyle when she maintains no connections with others. Her father has continued his attempts to pursue a lawsuit regarding her mother's death, even though his appeals are repeatedly denied because her mother was speeding and therefore found at fault. Later, she interviews for a private jet company in Dubai, only for the interview to become increasingly demeaning and objectifying, though Cassandre takes the discomfort in her stride and does not react when the interviewer suggests that her lack of social connections makes her a great fit for the role.

Cassandre spends an evening bonding with her family over memories of childhood and her parents' love story. The next day, her father consents to destroying his wife's totaled car, and Cassandre visits the site of the fatal accident, which gives the family closure regarding her death. Cassandre travels to Dubai, where she watches The Dubai Fountain with other tourists under social distancing guidelines.

== Cast ==
- Adèle Exarchopoulos as Cassandre
- Mara Taquin as Melissa
- Alexandre Perrier as Jean
- Arthur Egloff as Arthur
- Tamara Al Saadi as Dounia
- David Martinez Pinon as base supervisor
- Marianna Masala as Wing hostess
- Blanche Vieillevoye as Wing hostess
- Veroline Vanderbeek as check-in counter passenger
- Bart Dezdari as Amant Varsovie
- Agnieszka Kozaczewska as trainer
- Erwan Maillot as Wing purser
- Jonathon Sawdon as English passenger
- Alessandro Duca as Melissa's boyfriend
- Jean-Benoît Ugeux as breakage expert
- Julie Sokolowski as Cassandre's Belgian friend

== Release ==
Zero Fucks Given was selected to be screened in the Critics' Week section at the 74th Cannes Film Festival, where it had its world premiere on 11 July 2021. It was released theatrically in France on 2 March 2022 by Condor and in Belgium on 16 March 2022 by Cinéart.

== Reception ==
=== Box office ===
Zero Fucks Given grossed $23,951 in Italy, $17,969 in Colombia and $966,168 in France for a worldwide total of $1 million, against an estimated production budget of $2.1 million.

=== Critical response ===
On the review aggregator website Rotten Tomatoes, the film holds an approval rating of 95% based on 22 reviews, with an average rating of 7/10. The website's critics consensus reads, "With bleak humor, Adèle Exarchopoulos takes us on an airborne Zero Fucks Given tour as she tries to outrun grief subconsciously propelled by her desire to live." Metacritic, which uses a weighted average, assigned the film a score of 77 out of 100, based on 5 critics, indicating "generally favorable" reviews.

Jordan Mintzer of The Hollywood Reporter praised Marre and Lecoustre's depiction of Cassandre's "ruthless hyper-[capitalist]" working life and commended Exarchopoulos's performance, writing, "Even when we're stuck with Cassandre in the same routine, the film remains engrossing because of how committed Exarchopoulos is to her role, putting on way too much makeup so she can resemble the perfect Wing stewardess."

=== Accolades ===
| Award | Date of ceremony | Category | Recipient(s) | Result | Ref. |
|---|---|---|---|---|---|
| Cannes Film Festival | 15 July 2021 | Gan Foundation Award for Distribution | Condor | Won | |
| Cannes Film Festival | 15 July 2021 | Critics' Week Nespresso Grand Prize | Emmanuel Marre, Julie Lecoustre | Nominated | |
| Cannes Film Festival | 17 July 2021 | Caméra d'Or | Emmanuel Marre, Julie Lecoustre | Nominated | |
| César Awards | 24 February 2023 | Best Actress | Adèle Exarchopoulos | Nominated | |
| Lumière Awards | 16 January 2023 | Best International Co-Production | Zero Fucks Given | Nominated | |
| Magritte Awards | 4 March 2023 | Best Film | Zero Fucks Given | Nominated | |
| Magritte Awards | 4 March 2023 | Best Director | Emmanuel Marre, Julie Lecoustre | Nominated | |
| Magritte Awards | 4 March 2023 | Best Supporting Actress | Mara Taquin | Nominated | |
| Magritte Awards | 4 March 2023 | Best Screenplay | Emmanuel Marre, Julie Lecoustre | Nominated | |
| Magritte Awards | 4 March 2023 | Best First Feature Film | Emmanuel Marre, Julie Lecoustre | Won | |
| Magritte Awards | 4 March 2023 | Best Cinematography | Olivier Boonjing | Nominated | |
| Magritte Awards | 4 March 2023 | Best Production Design | Anna Falguères | Nominated | |
| Magritte Awards | 4 March 2023 | Best Costume Design | Prunelle Rulens | Won | |
| Magritte Awards | 4 March 2023 | Best Editing | Nicolas Rumpl | Won | |
