= Manuel Dacosse =

Belgian cinematographer

- Born: 1977 (age 48–49); Uccle, Belgium
- Occupations: Cinematographer; camera operator
- Years active: 2001–present
- Website: manudacosse.com

Manuel "Manu" Dacosse is a Belgian cinematographer. He is known for his work with directors Hélène Cattet and Bruno Forzani on the films Amer (2009), The Strange Colour of Your Body's Tears (2013), and Let the Corpses Tan (2017), the last two of which earned him the Magritte Award for Best Cinematography.

He collaborated with director François Ozon on L'Amant double (2017) and By the Grace of God (2019); the latter received five nominations at the 25th Lumière Awards, including Best Cinematography for Dacosse. His film credits also include Torpedo (2012), Mobile Home (2012), Tasher Desh (2012), Alleluia (2014), The Lady in the Car with Glasses and a Gun (2015), Evolution (2015), Axolotl Overkill (2017), Adoration (2019), and The Silencing (2020).

== Selected filmography ==
Year	Title	Notes
2009	Amer	Nominated—Camerimage Award for Best Cinematography; Nominated—Magritte Award for Best Cinematography
2012	Torpedo	
2012	Mobile Home	
2012	The ABCs of Death	Segment: "O is for Orgasm"
2012	Tasher Desh	
2013	The Strange Colour of Your Body's Tears	Magritte Award for Best Cinematography; Nashville Film Festival Award for Best Cinematography
2014	Alleluia	Magritte Award for Best Cinematography
2015	The Lady in the Car with Glasses and a Gun	
2015	Evolution	San Sebastián Film Festival Award for Best Cinematography; Stockholm Film Festival Award for Best Cinematography; Nominated—ICS Award for Best Cinematography; Nominated—Magritte Award for Best Cinematography; Nominated—UK Horror Award for Best Editing/Visual Style
2016	Odd Job	
2017	Let the Corpses Tan	Magritte Award for Best Cinematography
2017	Axolotl Overkill	Sundance Film Festival Award for Best Cinematography
2017	L'Amant double	
2018	The Emperor of Paris	
2019	By the Grace of God	Nominated—Lumière Award for Best Cinematography
2019	Adoration	Sitges Film Festival Award for Best Cinematography; Nominated—Magritte Award for Best Cinematography
2020	The Silencing	
2021	Inexorable	
2022	Peter von Kant	
2023	Vincent Must Die	
2024	Maldoror	
2025	Reflection in a Dead Diamond	
