= Michiel Blanchart =

Belgian film director (born 1993)

- Born: 1993 (age 32–33); Leuven, Belgium
- Occupations: Film director; screenwriter
- Years active: 2014–present

Michiel Blanchart (born 1993) is a Belgian film director and screenwriter. His feature debut film, Night Call (2024), earned him four Magritte Awards: Best Film, Best First Feature Film, Best Screenplay and Best Director.

== Early life ==
Blanchart was born to a Walloon father and a Flemish mother. He completed his secondary education in France, where he obtained a literary baccalaureate. He later studied filmmaking at the Institut des Arts de Diffusion (IAD) in Louvain-la-Neuve, Belgium.

== Career ==
In 2021, his short film You're Dead, Hélène, produced by Sam Raimi, was shortlisted for Best Live Action Short Film category at the 95th Academy Awards.

In 2024, Blanchart made his feature-length directorial debut with Night Call, a film set during a single night against the backdrop of a Black Lives Matter protest in Belgium. Blanchart co-wrote the film with Gilles Marchand. The film was well received by critics and won the André Cavens Award for Best Film from the Belgian Film Critics Association. It received eleven nominations at the 14th Magritte Awards, winning ten, including Best Film, Best First Feature Film, Best Screenplay and Best Director for Blanchart, holding the record for the most Magritte Awards won by a single film.

In October 2025, it was announced that Blanchart would direct the seventh installment in the Final Destination series.

== Filmography ==
Short film

Year	Title	Director	Writer	Notes
2016	L'annonce	Yes	Yes	
2016	Lulu	Yes	Yes	
2018	Dynaman	Yes	Yes	
2018	Cul	Yes	Yes	Also special effects and producer
2021	You're Dead, Hélène	Yes	Yes	

TV series

Year	Title	Notes
2019	La Vague (pilote)	Episode "Retours" (Credited as co-director)

Feature film

Year	Title	Director	Writer	Notes	Ref.
2024	Night Call	Yes	Yes	Feature film debut	
2028	Final Destination 7	Yes	No	English language debut	

== Accolades ==
Year	Association	Category	Work	Result	Ref.
2025	Magritte Awards	Best Film	Night Call	Won	
2025	Magritte Awards	Best First Feature Film	Night Call	Won	
2025	Magritte Awards	Best Director	Night Call	Won	
2025	Magritte Awards	Best Screenplay	Night Call	Won	
