= Laurent Micheli =

Belgian Director

- Born: 9 October 1982 (age 43); Brussels, Belgium
- Education: Institut Supérieur des Arts
- Occupations: Director; writer; stage actor
- Years active: 2007–present

Laurent Micheli (born 9 October 1982) is a Belgian film and stage director, writer and actor.

== Career ==
After developing an interest in acting, Micheli enrolled at the Institut Supérieur des Arts in Brussels and graduated from there in 2007. He began working in theatre appearing in productions from Belgium and France over the span of ten years. He later started directing his own stage productions, most notably with the theatrical company Madame Véro.

Micheli made his feature-length debut in 2016 with Even Lovers Get the Blues, a drama film he directed and produced while he attended a screenwriting workshop at La Fémis in Paris. The film was praised for its exploration of sexuality and earned Micheli a Magritte Award nomination in the category of Best First Feature Film.

His followup, Lola (2019), starred Mya Bollaers, in her acting debut, as an 18-year-old transgender girl grieving the death of her mother. The film was released to critical acclaim and received seven nominations at the 10th Magritte Awards, including Best Film and Best Director for Micheli. It was also nominated for the César Award for Best Foreign Film at the 45th César Awards.
