= Philippe Van Leeuw =

Belgian film director, screenwriter and cinematographer

Philippe Van Leeuw is a Belgian film director, screenwriter and cinematographer. He made his feature-length debut in 2009 with The Day God Walked Away. In 2017, he wrote and directed Insyriated, which premiered at the 67th Berlin International Film Festival. At the 8th Magritte Awards, the film won all six awards it was nominated for, tying the Magritte Awards record for most awards won (alongside Mr. Nobody), including Best Film and Best Director for Van Leeuw.

== Filmography ==
- 2023: The Wall
- 2016: Une de perdue! (Short)
- 2016: Saigneurs (Documentary)
- 2013: Stable Unstable
- 2012: Asfouri
- 2009: Mouton noir
- 2008: Terre (Short)
- 2008: God's Offices
- 2007: Rock'n Roll Circu
- 2007: Fin (Short)
- 2007: Demented
