= Magritte Award for Best Director =

Belgian film award

- Presented by: Académie André Delvaux
- First award: 2011
- Currently held by: Laura Wandel, Playground (2021)
- Website: lesmagritteducinema.com

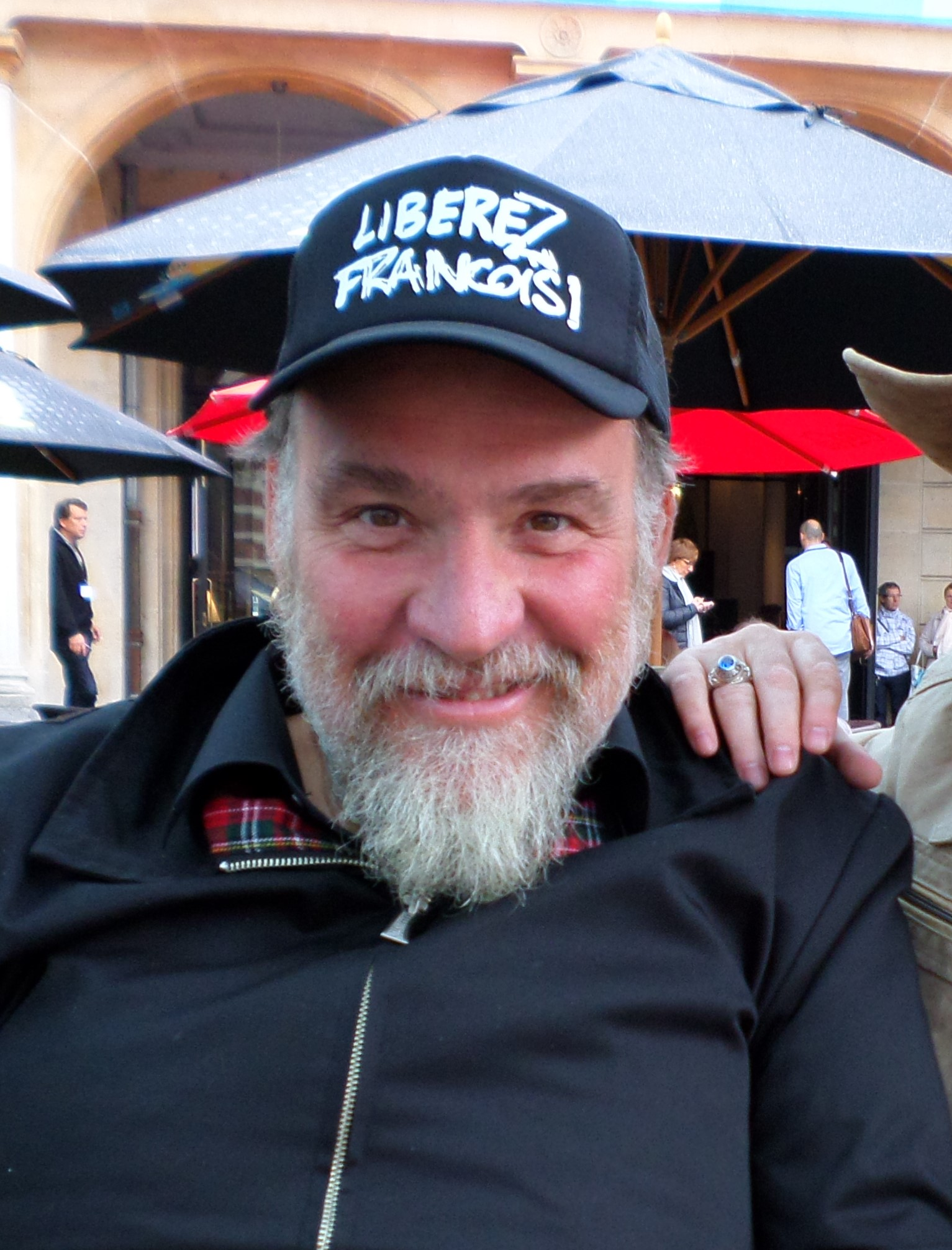
Bouli Lanners

The Magritte Award for Best Director (French: Magritte du meilleur réalisateur) is an award presented annually by the Académie André Delvaux. It is given in honor of a film director who has exhibited outstanding directing while working within the film industry. It is one of the Magritte Awards, which were established to recognize excellence in Belgian cinematic achievements.

The 1st Magritte Awards ceremony was held in 2011 with Jaco Van Dormael receiving the award for his work in Mr. Nobody. As of the 2022 ceremony, Laura Wandel is the most recent winner in this category for her work in Playground.

== Winners and nominees ==
In the list below, winners are listed first in the colored row, followed by the other nominees.

=== 2010s ===
| Year | Director(s) | English title | Original title |
|---|---|---|---|
| 2010 (1st) | Jaco Van Dormael | Mr. Nobody | |
| 2010 (1st) | Joachim Lafosse | Private Lessons | Élève libre |
| 2010 (1st) | Olivier Masset-Depasse | Illegal | Illégal |
| 2010 (1st) | Nabil Ben Yadir | The Barons | Les Barons |
| 2011 (2nd) | Bouli Lanners | The Giants | Les Géants |
| 2011 (2nd) | Dominique Abel and Fiona Gordon | The Fairy | La Fée |
| 2011 (2nd) | Jean-Pierre and Luc Dardenne | The Kid with a Bike | Le Gamin au vélo |
| 2011 (2nd) | Sam Garbarski | A Distant Neighborhood | Quartier lointain |
| 2012 (3rd) | Joachim Lafosse | Our Children | À perdre la raison |
| 2012 (3rd) | Lucas Belvaux | One Night | 38 témoins |
| 2012 (3rd) | François Pirot | Mobile Home | |
| 2012 (3rd) | Patrick Ridremont | Dead Man Talking | |
| 2013 (4th) | Stéphane Aubier and Vincent Patar | Ernest & Celestine | Ernest et Célestine |
| 2013 (4th) | Frédéric Fonteyne | Tango libre | |
| 2013 (4th) | Sam Garbarski | Vijay and I | |
| 2013 (4th) | Vincent Lannoo | In the Name of the Son | Au nom du fils |
| 2014 (5th) | Jean-Pierre and Luc Dardenne | Two Days, One Night | Deux jours, une nuit |
| 2014 (5th) | Lucas Belvaux | Not My Type | Pas son genre |
| 2014 (5th) | Nabil Ben Yadir | The Marchers | La Marche |
| 2014 (5th) | Yolande Moreau | Henri | |
| 2015 (6th) | Jaco Van Dormael | The Brand New Testament | Le Tout Nouveau Testament |
| 2015 (6th) | Bernard Bellefroid | Melody | |
| 2015 (6th) | Savina Dellicour | All Cats Are Grey | Tous les chats sont gris |
| 2015 (6th) | Fabrice Du Welz | Alleluia | |
| 2016 (7th) | Bouli Lanners | The First, the Last | Les Premiers, les Derniers |
| 2016 (7th) | Joachim Lafosse | After Love | L'Économie du couple |
| 2016 (7th) | Valéry Rosier | Parasol | |
| 2016 (7th) | Xavier Seron | Death by Death | Je me tue à le dire |
| 2017 (8th) | Philippe Van Leeuw | Insyriated | |
| 2017 (8th) | Lucas Belvaux | This Is Our Land | Chez nous |
| 2017 (8th) | Nabil Ben Yadir | Blind Spot | Dode Hoek |
| 2017 (8th) | Stephan Streker | A Wedding | Noces |
| 2018 (9th) | Guillaume Senez | Our Struggles | Nos batailles |
| 2018 (9th) | Hélène Cattet and Bruno Forzani | Let the Corpses Tan | Laissez bronzer les cadavres |
| 2018 (9th) | Olivier Meys | Bitter Flowers | |
| 2018 (9th) | François Troukens and Jean-François Hensgens | Above the Law | Tueurs |
| 2019 (10th) | Olivier Masset-Depasse | Mothers' Instinct | Duelles |
| 2019 (10th) | Jean-Pierre and Luc Dardenne | Young Ahmed | Le Jeune Ahmed |
| 2019 (10th) | César Díaz | Our Mothers | Nuestras madres |
| 2019 (10th) | Laurent Micheli | Lola | Lola vers la mer |

=== 2020s ===
| Year | Director(s) | English title | Original title |
|---|---|---|---|
| 2020/21 (11th) | Laura Wandel | Playground | Un monde |
| 2020/21 (11th) | Fabrice Du Welz | Adoration | |
| 2020/21 (11th) | Joachim Lafosse | The Restless | Les Intranquilles |
| 2020/21 (11th) | Ann Sirot and Raphaël Balboni | Madly in Life | Une vie démente |
| 2022 (12th) | Bouli Lanners | Nobody Has to Know | L'Ombre d'un mensonge |
| 2022 (12th) | Nabil Ben Yadir | Animals | |
| 2022 (12th) | Julie Lecoustre and Emmanuel Marre | Zero Fucks Given | Rien à foutre |
| 2022 (12th) | Jean-Pierre and Luc Dardenne | Tori and Lokita | Tori et Lokita |
| 2023 (13th) | Emmanuelle Nicot | Love According to Dalva | Dalva |
| 2023 (13th) | Baloji | Omen | Augure |
| 2023 (13th) | Zeno Graton | The Lost Boys | Le Paradis |
| 2023 (13th) | Ann Sirot and Raphaël Balboni | The Experience of Love | Le Syndrome des amours passées |
| 2024 (14th) | Michiel Blanchart | Night Call | La nuit se traîne |
| 2024 (14th) | Delphine Girard | Through the Night | Quitter la nuit |
| 2024 (14th) | Jawad Rhalib | Amal | |
| 2024 (14th) | Paloma Sermon-Daï | It's Raining in the House | Il pleut dans la maison |
