= 9th Magritte Awards =

2019 Belgian film awards ceremony

- Official poster
- Date: 2 February 2019
- Site: Square; Mont des Arts, Brussels, Belgium
- Hosted by: Alex Vizorek

Highlights
- Best Film: Our Struggles
- Most awards: Our Struggles (5)
- Most nominations: Above the Law and Girl (9)

Television coverage
- Network: RTBF

The 9th Magritte Awards ceremony, presented by the Académie André Delvaux, honored the best films of 2018 in Belgium and took place on 2 February 2019 at the Square in the historic site of Mont des Arts, Brussels, beginning at 8:00 p.m. CET. During the ceremony, the Académie André Delvaux presented Magritte Awards in 22 categories. The ceremony was televised in Belgium by La Deux. Directors Vincent Patar and Stéphane Aubier presided the ceremony, while comedian Alex Vizorek hosted the show for the first time.

The nominees for the 9th Magritte Awards were announced on 11 January 2019. Films with the most nominations were Above the Law and Girl with nine, followed by Let the Corpses Tan with eight, and The Benefit of the Doubt and Our Struggles with seven. The winners were announced during the awards ceremony on 2 February 2019. Our Struggles won five awards, including Best Film and Best Director for Guillaume Senez. Other multiple winners were Girl with four awards and Let the Corpses Tan with two.

== Winners and nominees ==
=== Best Film ===
- Our Struggles (Nos batailles)
  - Above the Law (Tueurs)
  - Bitter Flowers
  - Mon Ket
  - Let the Corpses Tan (Laissez bronzer les cadavres)

=== Best Director ===
- Guillaume Senez – Our Struggles (Nos batailles)
  - Hélène Cattet and Bruno Forzani – Let the Corpses Tan (Laissez bronzer les cadavres)
  - Olivier Meys – Bitter Flowers
  - François Troukens and Jean-François Hensgens – Above the Law (Tueurs)

=== Best Actor ===
- Victor Polster – Girl
  - François Damiens – Mon Ket
  - Olivier Gourmet – Above the Law (Tueurs)
  - Benoît Poelvoorde – Keep an Eye Out (Au poste!)

=== Best Actress ===
- Lubna Azabal – Above the Law (Tueurs)
  - Cécile de France – Mademoiselle de Joncquières
  - Yolande Moreau – I Feel Good
  - Natacha Régnier – The Benefit of the Doubt (Une Part d'ombre)

=== Best Supporting Actor ===
- Arieh Worthalter – Girl
  - Yoann Blanc – The Benefit of the Doubt (Une Part d'ombre)
  - Bouli Lanners – Above the Law (Tueurs)
  - Pierre Nisse – Let the Corpses Tan (Laissez bronzer les cadavres)

=== Best Supporting Actress ===
- Lucie Debay – Our Struggles (Nos batailles)
  - Tania Garbarski – Bye Bye Germany (Es war einmal in Deutschland...)
  - Salomé Richard – The Faithful Son (La Part sauvage)
  - Erika Sainte – The Benefit of the Doubt (Une Part d'ombre)

=== Most Promising Actor ===
- Thomas Mustin – The Royal Exchange (L'Échange des princesses)
  - Basile Grunberger – Our Struggles (Nos batailles)
  - Baptiste Lalieu – The Benefit of the Doubt (Une Part d'ombre)
  - Matteo Salamone – Mon Ket

=== Most Promising Actress ===
- Lena Girard Voss – Our Struggles (Nos batailles)
  - Myriem Akheddiou – The Benefit of the Doubt (Une Part d'ombre)
  - Bérénice Baoo – Above the Law (Tueurs)
  - Nawell Madani – Stand Up Girl (C'est tout pour moi)
  - Anaël Snoek – The Wild Boys (Les Garçons sauvages)

=== Best Screenplay ===
- Girl – Lukas Dhont and Angelo Tijssens
  - Bitter Flowers – Olivier Meys and Maarten Loix
  - Bye Bye Germany (Es war einmal in Deutschland...) – Sam Garbarski
  - Our Struggles (Nos batailles) – Guillaume Senez

=== Best First Feature Film ===
- Bitter Flowers
  - Above the Law (Tueurs)
  - The Benefit of the Doubt (Une Part d'ombre)
  - The Faithful Son (La Part sauvage)

=== Best Flemish Film ===
- Girl
  - Angel (Un Ange)
  - Don't Shoot (Niet Schieten)
  - Gangsta (Patser)

=== Best Foreign Film in Coproduction ===
- The Man Who Killed Don Quixote
  - The Death of Stalin
  - The Happy Prince
  - Nico, 1988

=== Best Cinematography ===
- Let the Corpses Tan (Laissez bronzer les cadavres) – Manuel Dacosse
  - Above the Law (Tueurs) – Jean-François Hensgens
  - Girl – Frank van den Eeden

=== Best Production Design ===
- Let the Corpses Tan (Laissez bronzer les cadavres) – Alina Santos
  - Bye Bye Germany (Es war einmal in Deutschland...) – Véronique Sacrez
  - Girl – Philippe Bertin

=== Best Costume Design ===
- Bye Bye Germany (Es war einmal in Deutschland...) – Nathalie Leborgne
  - Girl – Catherine van Bree
  - Let the Corpses Tan (Laissez bronzer les cadavres) – Jackye Fauconnier

=== Best Original Score ===
- When Arabs Danced – Simon Fransquet
  - The Benefit of the Doubt (Une Part d'ombre) – Vincent Liben
  - The Faithful Son (La Part sauvage) – Manuel Roland and Maarten Van Cauwenberghe

=== Best Sound ===
- Let the Corpses Tan (Laissez bronzer les cadavres) – Yves Bemelmans, Dan Bruylandt, Olivier Thys, Benoit Biral
  - Above the Law (Tueurs) – Marc Engels, Thomas Gauder, Ingrid Simon
  - Girl – Yanna Soentjens

=== Best Editing ===
- Our Struggles (Nos batailles) – Julie Brenta
  - Girl – Alain Dessauvage
  - Let the Corpses Tan (Laissez bronzer les cadavres) – Bernard Beets

=== Best Fiction Short Film ===
- Icarus (Icare) – Nicolas Boucart
  - Calamity – Séverine De Streyker and Maxime Feyers
  - Castle to Castle (D'un château l'autre) – Emmanuel Marre
  - A Sister (Une Soeur) – Delphine Girard

=== Best Animated Short Film ===
- The Proposal (La Bague au doigt) – Gerlando Infuso
  - Carnal Symbiosis (Simbiosis Carnal) – Rocío Álvarez
  - The Horn Quartet (Le Quatuor à cornes) – Arnaud Demuynck and Benjamin Bottela
  - Not Today – Marine Jacob

=== Best Documentary Film ===
- So Help Me God (Ni juge, ni soumise) – Jean Libon
  - Cowboys and Indians: the Cinema of Patar and Aubier (Des Cowboys et des Indiens, le cinéma de Patar et Aubier) – Fabrice du Welz
  - Holy Tour (La Grand-Messe) – Valéry Rosier and Méryl Fortunat-Rossi
  - Manu – Emmanuelle Bonmariage
  - Mitra – Jorge León

=== Honorary Magritte Award ===
- Raoul Servais

== Films with multiple nominations and awards ==
The following nine films received multiple nominations.

- Nine: Above the Law, Girl
- Eight: Let the Corpses Tan
- Seven: The Benefit of the Doubt, Our Struggles
- Four: Bitter Flowers, Bye Bye Germany
- Three: The Faithful Son, Mon Ket

The following three films received multiple awards.

- Five: Our Struggles
- Four: Girl
- Three: Let the Corpses Tan

== See also ==
- 44th César Awards
- 24th Lumières Awards
- 2018 in film
