= Let the Corpses Tan =

2017 film

- Theatrical release poster
- French: Laissez bronzer les cadavres
- Directed by: Hélène Cattet; Bruno Forzani
- Screenplay by: Hélène Cattet; Bruno Forzani
- Based on: Laissez bronzer les cadavres by: Jean-Patrick Manchette; Jean-Pierre Bastid
- Produced by: Eve Commenge; François Cognard
- Starring: Elina Löwensohn; Stéphane Ferrara; Bernie Bonvoisin; Marc Barbé
- Cinematography: Manuel Dacosse
- Edited by: Bernard Beets
- Production companies: Anonymes Films; Tobina Film
- Release dates: 4 August 2017 (Locarno); 18 October 2017 (France); 10 January 2018 (Belgium)
- Running time: 92 minutes
- Countries: Belgium; France
- Language: French
- Box office: $93,409

Let the Corpses Tan (French: Laissez bronzer les cadavres) is a 2017 Belgian neo-western crime film written and directed by Hélène Cattet and Bruno Forzani, based on the novel Laissez bronzer les cadavres by Jean-Patrick Manchette and Jean-Pierre Bastid. The film follows a gang of thieves who, after obtaining 250 kg (550 lb) of stolen gold, arrive at the home of an artist who is caught in a love triangle. The situation quickly escalates into a day long gun fight between police and robbers.

Let the Corpses Tan premiered at the Locarno Film Festival on 4 August 2017, where it was nominated for the Piazza Grande Award. The film was theatrically released in France on October 18, 2017, to positive reviews from critics, with many praising the visual style, while others were critical of the narrative structure. It received eight nominations at the 9th Magritte Awards, including Best Film and Best Director for Cattet and Forzani, while Manuel Dacosse won for Best Cinematography.

== Cast ==
- Elina Löwensohn as Luce
- Stéphane Ferrara as Rhino, the leader of the gang
- Bernie Bonvoisin as the brute
- Marc Barbé as Max Bernier
- Michelangelo Marchese as the lawyer
- Pierre Nisse as the young man
- Marine Sainsily as Rose
- Hervé Sogne as policeman
- Marilyn Jess as policewoman
- Dorylia Calmel as Mélanie, Bernier's wife
- Aline Stevens as the golden woman

== Production ==
Produced by Belgian producer Eve Commenge (Anonymes Films), in co-production with French producer François Cognard (Tobina Film).

Let the Corpses Tan was predominantly shot in Corsica.

== Release ==
Let the Corpses Tan premiered at the Locarno Film Festival on 4 August 2017.

The film received its North American Premiere at the Midnight Madness screening at the Toronto International Film Festival in 2017. It was released in France on 2017 October 18 and in Belgium on 10 January 2018 by Anonymes Films.

== Reception ==
=== Critical response ===
On Rotten Tomatoes, the film has an approval rating of 75% based on 75 reviews with an average rating of 6.50/10 with the critical consensus reading "Let the Corpses Tan challenges the audience's expectations -- and delivers a singularly stylish, unforgettably unique viewing experience in the bargain." On Metacritic it has a score of 62% based on reviews from 17 critics, indicating "generally favorable reviews".

Neil Young of The Hollywood Reporter referred to the film as "borderline incoherent" stating that after all the double and triple crosses in the film, it was nearly impossible to follow without knowledge of the source material. Allan Hunter of Screen Daily shared similar ideas, opining that the film had "style to burn" and that it was a "a film of almost delirious excess" although he didn't care for any of the characters. He enjoyed the "intoxicating aspect of watching a team so in single-minded and in control of their filmmaking technique. After a while, though, it does start to ring hollow."

=== Box office ===
Let the Corpses Tan grossed $93,409 at the box office.

=== Accolades ===
Award / Film Festival	Category	Recipients	Result
Magritte Awards	Best Film		Nominated
Magritte Awards	Best Director	Hélène Cattet and Bruno Forzani	Nominated
Magritte Awards	Best Supporting Actor	Pierre Nisse	Nominated
Magritte Awards	Best Cinematography	Manuel Dacosse	Won
Magritte Awards	Best Production Design	Alina Santos	Won
Magritte Awards	Best Costume Design	Jackye Fauconnier	Nominated
Magritte Awards	Best Sound	Yves Bemelmans, Dan Bruylandt, Olivier Thys, Benoit Biral	Won
Magritte Awards	Best Editing	Bernard Beets	Nominated
Locarno Festival	Piazza Grande Award		Nominated
Warsaw Film Festival	Free Spirit Award	Hélène Cattet and Bruno Forzani	Nominated
