= The Faithful Son =

- Film poster
- Directed by: Guérin Van de Vorst
- Produced by: Benoit Roland; Guillaume Schuermans
- Starring: Vincent Rottiers
- Release dates: 5 October 2017 (Namur); 24 March 2018
- Running time: 80 minutes
- Countries: Belgium; France
- Language: French

The Faithful Son (French: La Part sauvage) is a 2017 Belgian drama film directed by Guérin Van de Vorst in his directorial debut. It is based on the short film of the same name by Van de Vorst, who wrote the screenplay with Matthieu Reynaert. The film had its world premiere at the Festival International du Film Francophone de Namur on 5 October 2017. It received three nominations at the 9th Magritte Awards, including Best First Feature Film.

== Cast ==
- Vincent Rottiers as Ben
- Sébastien Houbani as Anouar
- Johan Libéreau as Jo
- Salomé Richard as Lucie
- Walid Afkir as Mustapha
- Simon Caudry as Sam

== Accolades ==
Award / Film Festival	Category	Recipients and nominees	Result
Festival du Film Francophone	Best First Feature Film		Nominated
Magritte Awards	Best First Feature Film		Nominated
Magritte Awards	Best Supporting Actress	Salomé Richard	Nominated
Magritte Awards	Best Original Score	Manuel Roland, Maarten Van Cauwenberghe	Nominated
