= Emmanuel Marre =

French filmmaker (born 1979 or 1980)

- Marre at the 2026 Cannes Film Festival
- Born: 1979 or 1980 (age 46–47); Paris, France
- Education: Institut des arts de diffusion
- Occupations: Director; screenwriter
- Years active: 2008–present
- Partner: Julie Lecoustre

Emmanuel Marre (French pronunciation: [emanɥɛl maʁ]; born 1979 or 1980) is a French film director and screenwriter. He is best known for his films Zero Fucks Given (2021) and A Man of His Time (2026), the latter of which won him the Cannes Film Festival Award for Best Screenplay.

== Biography ==
Marre attended the Institut des arts de diffusion in Louvain-la-Neuve, Belgium, where he befriended Swiss filmmaker Antoine Russbach. He began his career writing and directing short films. His debut feature film, Zero Fucks Given, was announced in February 2020, with Adèle Exarchopoulos starring. It premiered in the Critics' Week section of the 2021 Cannes Film Festival.

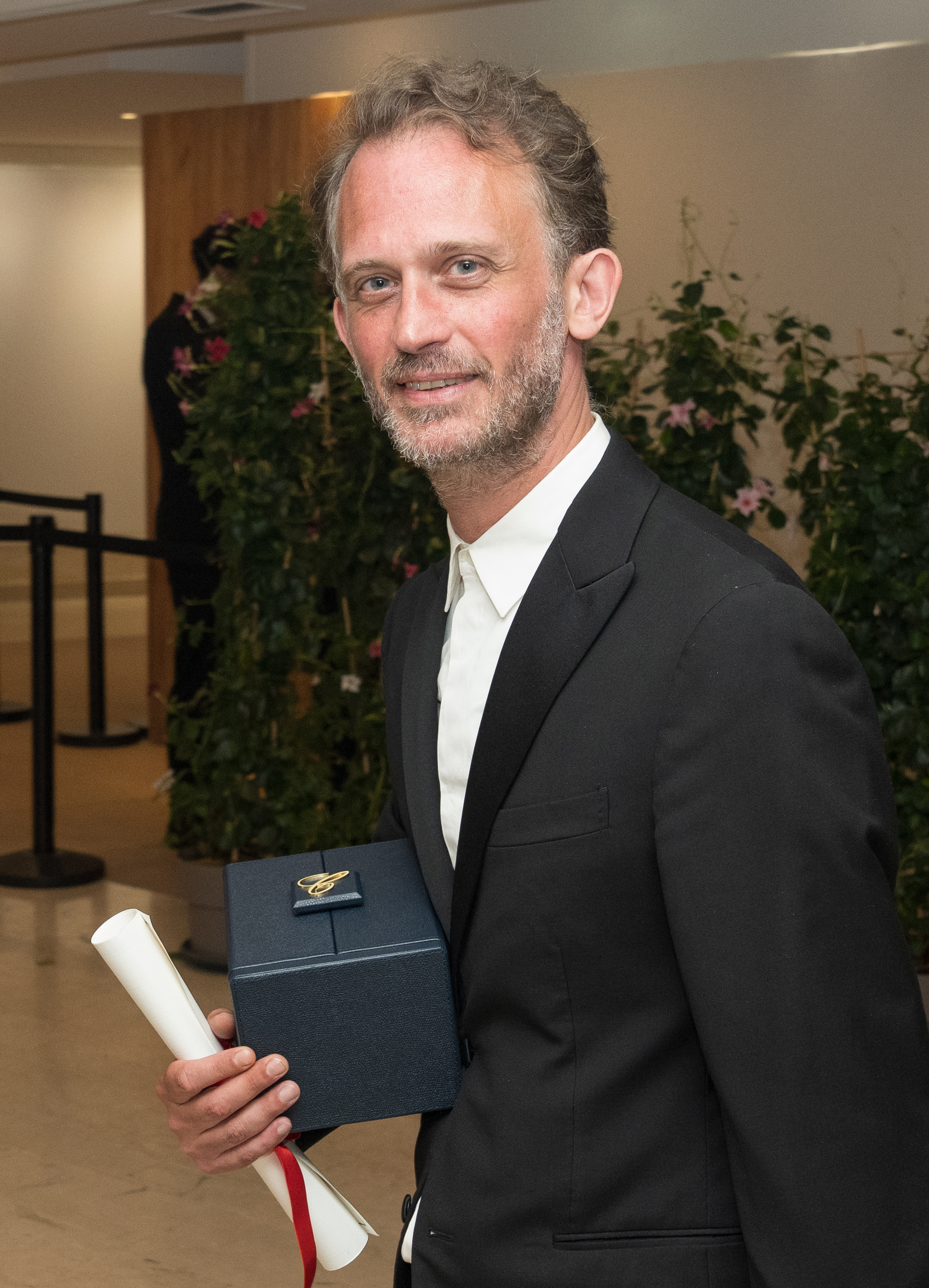
Marre at the awards ceremony of the 2026 Cannes Film Festival

His second feature film, A Man of His Time, was announced in April 2025, with Swann Arlaud starring as Henri Marre, Marre's own great-grandfather, during the Vichy regime. Filming took place over nine weeks. It was screened in the main competition of the 2026 Cannes Film Festival, where Marre won the award for Best Screenplay.

=== Personal life ===
Marre has worked between France and Belgium, and lives in Brussels. His partner is French screenwriter Julie Lecoustre.

== Filmography ==
=== Feature films ===
Year	English Title	Original Title	Director	Writer	Notes	Ref.
2018	Those Who Work	D'un château l'autre	No	Yes	Co-written with Antoine Russbach	
2021	Zero Fucks Given	Rien à foutre	Yes	Yes	Co-written and co-directed with Julie Lecoustre and Mariette Désert	
2026	A Man of His Time	Notre Salut	Yes	Yes		

=== Short films ===
Year	Title	Director	Writer	Notes	Ref.
2008	Michel	Yes	Yes	Short film; co-written and directed with Antoine Russbach	
2008	La vie qui va avec	Yes	Yes	Short film	
2011	Le petit chevalier	Yes	Yes	Short film	
2014	Le désarroi du flic socialiste Quechua	Yes	Yes	Short film	
2017	The Summer Movie	Yes	Yes	Short film	
2018	Castle to Castle	Yes	Yes	Short film; co-written with Julie Lecoustre	

== Awards and nominations ==
Award	Year	Category	Nominated work	Result	Ref.
Berlin International Film Festival	2017	Short Film Golden Bear	The Summer Movie	Nominated	
Cannes Film Festival	2021	Critics' Week Grand Prix	Zero Fucks Given	Nominated	
Cannes Film Festival	2021	Caméra d'Or	Zero Fucks Given	Nominated	
Cannes Film Festival	2026	Palme d'Or	A Man of His Time	Nominated	
Cannes Film Festival	2026	Best Screenplay	A Man of His Time	Won	
Cinema Jove	2017	Luna de Valencia for Best Short Film	The Summer Movie	Nominated	
Clermont-Ferrand International Short Film Festival	2017	National Competition	Castle to Castle	Won	
Clermont-Ferrand International Short Film Festival	2019	International Competition	The Summer Movie	Nominated	
Festival International du Film Francophone de Namur	2011	Best Short Film Award	Le Petit Chevalier	Won	
Gijón International Film Festival	2021	Retueyos Competition	Zero Fucks Given	Won	
International Filmfestival Mannheim-Heidelberg	2021	Rainer Werner Fassbinder Award for Best Screenplay	Zero Fucks Given	Won	
Locarno Film Festival	2018	Golden Pardino for Best International Short Film	Castle to Castle	Won	
Locarno Film Festival	2018	Junior Jury Award	Castle to Castle	Won	
Lumière Awards	2023	Best International Co-Production	Zero Fucks Given	Nominated	
Magritte Awards	2018	Best Fiction Short Film	The Summer Movie	Nominated	
Magritte Awards	2019	Best Fiction Short Film	Castle to Castle	Nominated	
Magritte Awards	2023	Best Film	Zero Fucks Given	Nominated	
Magritte Awards	2023	Best Screenplay	Zero Fucks Given	Nominated	
Magritte Awards	2023	Best Screenplay	Zero Fucks Given	Nominated	
Magritte Awards	2023	Best First Feature Film	Zero Fucks Given	Won	
Seattle International Film Festival	2022	New Directors Competition	Zero Fucks Given	Nominated	
