= Hélène Cattet and Bruno Forzani =

French film directors

- Born: Hélène Cattet: 1976 (age 49–50); Paris, France Bruno Forzani: 1976 (age 49–50); Menton, France
- Occupations: Directors; writers; producers
- Years active: 2001–present

Hélène Cattet and Bruno Forzani are French husband-and-wife filmmakers based in Brussels, Belgium. They have worked as a writing and directing team for their entire professional film careers.

Their most acclaimed works include Amer (2009), The Strange Colour of Your Body's Tears (2013), and Let the Corpses Tan (2017).

== Career ==
Hélène Cattet, born in 1976 in Paris, and Bruno Forzani, born in the same year in Menton, France, met in Brussels in 1999 and moved there. After developing an interest in filmmaking, the couple directed a number self-produced short films, gaining critical attention in the independent festival circuit. Cattet and Forzani made their full-length debut in 2009 with Amer, an international coproduction between France and Belgium that was described as a postmodern homage to giallo films. The film received general acclaim from critics and earned the couple a Magritte Award nomination in the category of Best Film.

Cattet and Forzani then directed The Strange Colour of Your Body's Tears (2013), a thriller film starring Klaus Tange as a man who becomes entangled in a complicated web of lies and murder while seeking the whereabouts of his missing wife. The film polarized critics when it premiered at the 2013 Toronto International Film Festival, with Nicholas Bell from IndieWire calling it "one of the most cinematically extravagant explorations of the gaudy and grotesque ever committed to film".

Their next film, Let the Corpses Tan (2017), is an adaptation of the novel of the same name by Jean-Patrick Manchette and Jean-Pierre Bastid. It revolves around a gang of thieves who arrive at the home of an artist who is caught in a love triangle. The film received eight nominations at the 9th Magritte Awards, including Best Film and Best Director for Cattet and Forzani, winning three.

== Filmography ==
Feature films

Year	Film	Credited as		Notes
Year	Film	Director	Writer	Notes
2009	Amer	Yes	Yes	
2013	The Strange Colour of Your Body's Tears	Yes	Yes	
2017	Let the Corpses Tan	Yes	Yes	
2025	Reflection in a Dead Diamond	Yes	Yes	
TBD	Darling	Yes	Yes	Animated film – In production

Short films

Year	Film	Credited as		Notes
Year	Film	Director	Writer	Notes
2001	Catharsis	Yes	Yes	
2002	Yellow Room	Yes	Yes	
2003	The End of Our Love	Yes	Yes	
2004	The Strange Portrait of the Lady in Yellow	Yes	Yes	
2006	Santos Palace	Yes	Yes	
2012	O Is for Orgasm	Yes	Yes	Segment in The ABCs of Death
