= Théâtre national Wallonie-Bruxelles =

Theatre in Brussels, Belgium

Théâtre National Wallonie-Bruxelles
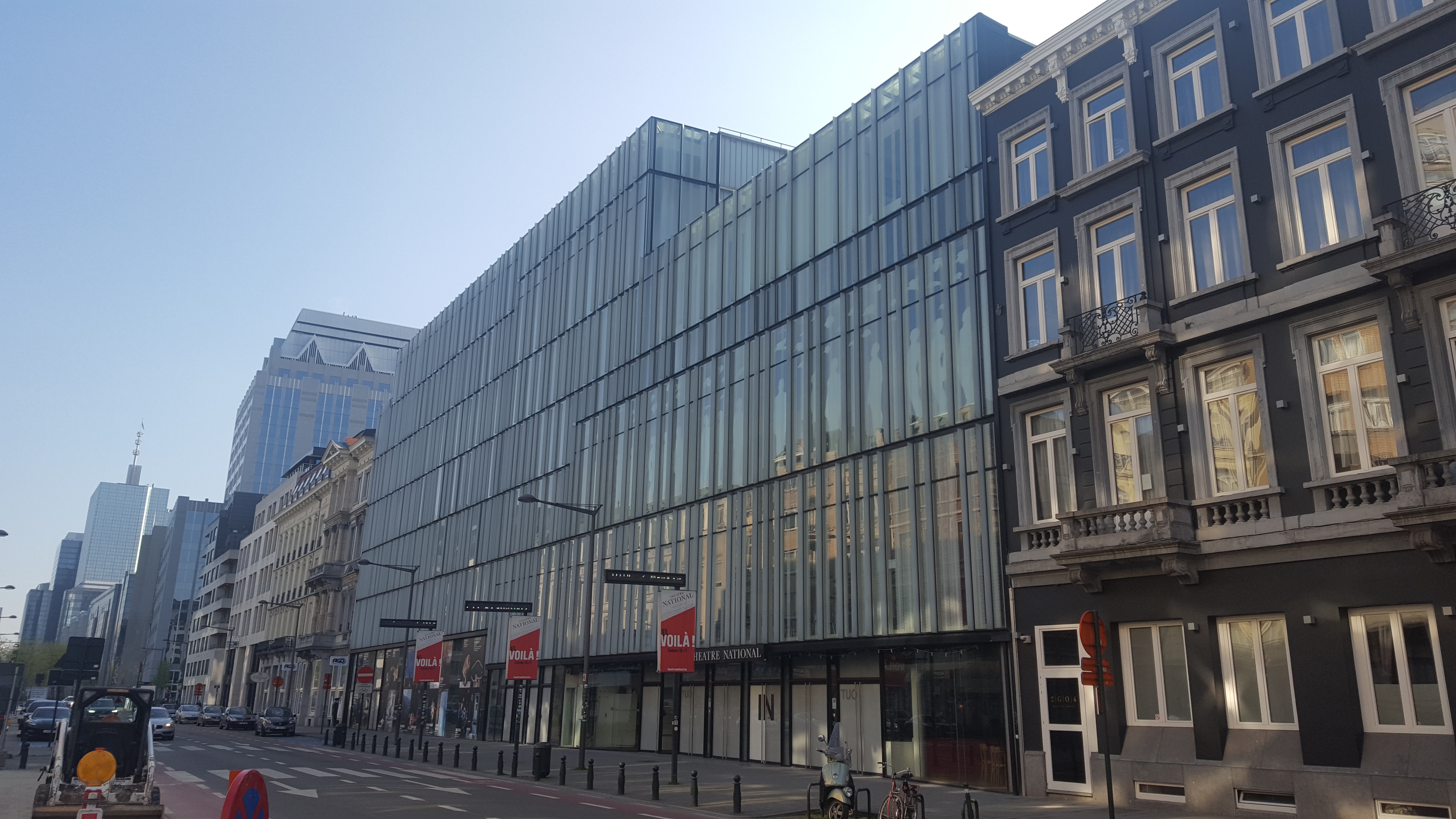
- The Théâtre national Wallonie-Bruxelles seen from the Boulevard Émile Jacqmain/Émile Jacqmainlaan
- Interactive map of Théâtre National Wallonie-Bruxelles
- Address: Boulevard Émile Jacqmain / Émile Jacqmainlaan 111/115; 1000 City of Brussels, Brussels-Capital Region; Belgium
- Coordinates: 50°51′16″N 4°21′15″E
- Owner: French Community
- Capacity: 750

Construction
- Opened: 19 September 1945
- Reopened: 16 November 2004

Website
- www.theatrenational.be

The Théâtre national Wallonie-Bruxelles (French pronunciation: [teɑtʁ nɑsjɔnal walɔni bʁysɛl]; "National Theatre Wallonia-Brussels") is a theatre in central Brussels, Belgium, owned by the French Community of Belgium. It is located at 111/115, boulevard Émile Jacqmain/Émile Jacqmainlaan.

== History ==
The Théâtre national Wallonie-Bruxelles was founded on 19 September 1945 by Prince Charles. It is the highest ranked theatre institution for the French Community of Belgium, with the largest number of productions. Since 2023, it has been the venue of the annual Magritte Awards ceremony.

== See also ==
- Royal Flemish Theatre
- History of Brussels
- Culture of Belgium
