= Time Out (2023 film) =

2023 film directed by Ève Duchemin

- Film poster
- Directed by: Ève Duchemin
- Written by: Ève Duchemin
- Produced by: Annabella Nezri; Annabelle Bouzom
- Starring: Karim Leklou; Isaka Sawadogo; Jarod Cousyns
- Cinematography: Colin Lévêque
- Edited by: Joachim Thôme
- Music by: Fabien Leclercq
- Production company: Kwassa Films
- Release dates: 28 January 2023 (Ostend); 19 April 2023
- Running time: 118 minutes
- Countries: Belgium; France
- Language: French

Time Out (French: Temps mort) is a 2023 Belgian-French drama film directed by Ève Duchemin in her directorial debut. The film stars Karim Leklou, Isaka Sawadogo and Jarod Cousyns as three inmates who are granted a weekend leave.

The film had its world premiere at the Ostend Film Festival on 28 January 2023. Upon release, Time Out was praised for its strong performances, production quality, and sensitive portrayal of its subject matter.

== Plot ==
The film follows three prisoners granted temporary leave from prison to spend a weekend with their families. While on leave, they struggle to reintegrate into the lives they left behind, confronting broken relationships and the emotional scars caused by their incarceration. The story focuses on their emotional turmoil, revealing the difficulty of resuming a normal life even for a brief period outside the prison walls. As they attempt to reconnect with their loved ones, unresolved tensions and fragile emotions come to the surface.

== Cast ==
- Karim Leklou as Bonnard
- Issaka Sawadogo as Hamousin
- Jarod Cousyns as Colin
- Johan Leysen as Bonnard's father
- Babetida Sadjo as Édith
- Martha Canga Antonio as Lucille

== Critical reception ==
Time Out received generally positive reviews, with particular praise for the cast's performances. On review aggregator website AlloCiné, the film holds an average score of three and a half stars out of five, based on a survey of 20 reviews. Jérôme Garcin from L'Obs called it a "heartbreaking debut," supported by "three exceptional actors" and directed by a filmmaker deeply engaged with themes of social struggle and marginalization. Christophe Caron from La Voix du Nord described the experience as a "torrent of fragile and disordered emotions," with an uncertain outcome that leaves the audience deeply moved.

The film explores the psychological and emotional burden that the prisoners carry with them, both within and outside the prison walls. It focuses on their attempts to reconnect with family members and navigate the challenges of rebuilding relationships damaged by their time in prison. The director, Ève Duchemin, has emphasized that the film is more about the emotional aftermath of imprisonment than the prison system itself.

== Accolades ==
Award / Film Festival	Category	Recipients and nominees	Result
Magritte Awards	Best Film		Nominated
Magritte Awards	Best First Feature Film	Ève Duchemin	Nominated
Tiantan Award	Best Film		Nominated
