= Above the Law (2017 film) =

- Film poster
- Directed by: François Troukens; Jean-François Hensgens
- Produced by: Jacques-Henri Bronckart; Olivier Bronckart
- Starring: Lubna Azabal; Olivier Gourmet; Bouli Lanners
- Release date: 10 December 2017
- Running time: 86 minutes
- Countries: Belgium; France
- Language: French

Above the Law (French: Tueurs) is a 2017 Belgian-French crime thriller film directed by François Troukens and Jean-François Hensgens.

It had its world premiere at the 74th Venice International Film Festival on 5 September 2017. It received nine nominations at the 9th Magritte Awards, including Best Film and Best Director for Troukens and Hensgens, and went on to win Best Actress for Lubna Azabal.

== Plot ==
Frank Valken, a career criminal, commits a bank heist with his crew. Upon leaving the bank, a group of hitmen arrives and kills witnesses, of which among them is a judge who was investigating a 30-year-old case of unsolved mass murders of Brabant. The killers from 30 years ago seem to have come back, and the police have arrested the wrong perpetrators.

== Cast ==
- Lubna Azabal as Lucie Tesla
- Olivier Gourmet as Frank Valken
- Kevin Janssens as Vik
- Bouli Lanners as Danny Bouvy
- Tibo Vandenborre as Santo
- Bérénice Baoo as Nora
- Anne Coesens as Hélène
- Johan Leysen as Jean Lemoine
- Natacha Régnier as Véronique Pirotte
- Jean-Louis Sbille as Minister Van Bollen
- Slimane Dazi as the prison officer

== Reception ==
The film received positive reviews. Jessica Kiang of Variety wrote: "While hardly boasting the most original of plots, it is informed by an authenticity rare for this popular genre with its pre-packaged tropes and formulae."

=== Accolades ===
Award / Film Festival	Category	Recipients	Result
Magritte Awards	Best Film		Nominated
Magritte Awards	Best Director	François Troukens and Jean-François Hensgens	Nominated
Magritte Awards	Best Actor	Olivier Gourmet	Nominated
Magritte Awards	Best Actress	Lubna Azabal	Won
Magritte Awards	Best Supporting Actor	Bouli Lanners	Nominated
Magritte Awards	Most Promising Actress	Bérénice Baoo	Nominated
Magritte Awards	Best First Feature Film		Nominated
Magritte Awards	Best Sound	Marc Engels, Thomas Gauder and Ingrid Simon	Nominated
Magritte Awards	Best Cinematography	Jean-François Hensgens	Nominated
