= All Cats Are Grey =

- Theatrical release poster
- Directed by: Savina Dellicour
- Written by: Savina Dellicour; Matthieu de Braconier
- Produced by: Valérie Bournonville; Joseph Rouschop
- Starring: Manon Capelle; Bouli Lanners; Anne Coesens
- Cinematography: Thomas Buelens
- Edited by: Ewin Ryckaert
- Production company: Tarantula Belgique
- Distributed by: O'Brother
- Release dates: November 25, 2014 (Turin); April 29, 2015 (Belgium)
- Running time: 85 minutes
- Country: Belgium
- Language: French
- Budget: €1.4 million

All Cats Are Grey (French: Tous les chats sont gris) is a 2014 Belgian coming-of-age drama film directed by Savina Dellicour and co-written by Dellicour and Matthieu de Braconier. All Cats Are Grey had its world premiere at the 32nd Turin Film Festival. It also screened as a special presentation during the 2015 Santa Barbara International Film Festival, where it won Best International Film. Critical response was generally strong and the film received nine nominations at the 6th Magritte Awards, including Best Film and Best Director for Dellicour.

== Plot ==
Dorothy (Manon Capelle) is a 15-year-old girl who was raised in a well-off residential neighbourhood of Brussels. She does not feel comfortable with her daily life, partly because of the detached relationship with her mother (Anne Coesens). Dorothy finds music a pleasant form of escape and passes her days listening to The Cure and new music artists. By chance, she meets Paul (Bouli Lanners), a 43-year-old man who works as a detective and leads a solitary existence after his wife's death. Dorothy asks him for help in the search for her biological father and Paul agrees. A strong connection arises between them, but Dorothy doest not know that he is actually her biological father. Over the years, away from Dorothy, Paul has always lived with this secret. Now back in Brussels he has been watching her from afar, without ever daring to approach her.

== Cast ==
- Manon Capelle as Dorothy
- Bouli Lanners as Paul
- Anne Coesens as Christine
- Aisleen McLafferty
- Astrid Whettnall
- Vincent Lecuyer

== Critical reception ==
Upon its screening at the Rome Film Festival, All Cats Are Grey was positively received with a standing ovation from the audience. On the review aggregator Cinebel, the film has received a weighted average score of 8.2 out of 10, based on 11 critics. Michaël Degré from L'Avenir felt that the film offers a smart reflection about fatherhood and family. Fernand Denis of La Libre Belgique called Dellicour's direction a "polished work" which displays a "sense of observation and a tone that mixes harmoniously humor and existential angst". He also regarded Lanners' acting as one of his finest performances.

Hugues Dayez from RTBF commented that Dellicour builds a real suspense drama in which she describes with "great accuracy" the social impact of two distant worlds: the modest and simple world of Paul, and the austere and hypocritical one of Christine. Louis Danvers from Le Vif wrote that the young Manon Capelle and Bouli Lanners form a "very convincing couple". He praised Dellicour's direction and Thomas Buelens' cinematography. The Canadian Film Institute described the film as "superbly written", filled with unexpected discoveries for characters and audience alike, and called Manon Capelle a revelation.

== Accolades ==
Award / Film Festival	Category	Recipient(s)	Result
Annonay International Film Festival	Grand Jury Prize		Nominated
Annonay International Film Festival	Audience Award		Won
Magritte Awards	Best Film		Nominated
Magritte Awards	Best Director	Savina Dellicour	Nominated
Magritte Awards	Best Actor	Bouli Lanners	Nominated
Magritte Awards	Best Supporting Actress	Anne Coesens	Won
Magritte Awards	Most Promising Actress	Manon Capelle	Nominated
Magritte Awards	Best Production Design	Paul Rouschop	Nominated
Magritte Awards	Best Costume Design	Sabine Zappitelli	Nominated
Magritte Awards	Best Editing	Ewin Ryckaert	Nominated
Magritte Awards	Best First Feature Film		Won
Mons International Film Festival	BeTV Prize		Won
Santa Barbara International Film Festival	Best International Film		Won
