= Parasol (film) =

- Theatrical release poster
- Directed by: Valéry Rosier
- Written by: Valéry Rosier; Matthieu Donck
- Produced by: Benoit Roland
- Cinematography: Olivier Boonjing
- Edited by: Nicolas Rumpl
- Release dates: 23 September 2015 (San Sebastián); 17 February 2016 (Belgium)
- Running time: 80 minutes
- Country: Belgium
- Language: French

Parasol is a 2015 Belgian drama film directed by Valéry Rosier. It premiered at the 2016 San Sebastián International Film Festival. The film received seven nominations at the 7th Magritte Awards, including Best Film and Best Director for Parasol.

== Cast ==
- Alfie Thomsone as Alfie
- Yoko Père as Pere
- Julienne Goeffers as Annie
- Christian Care as Christian
- Delphine Theodore as the receptionist
- Ahilen Saldano as Ahilen

== Accolades ==
| Award / Film Festival | Category | Recipients and nominees | Result |
|---|---|---|---|
| Amiens International Film Festival | Audience Award | | Won |
| Busan International Film Festival | Best Director | Valéry Rosier | Nominated |
| Hamburg Film Festival | Best Feature Film | | Nominated |
| Magritte Awards | Best Film | | Nominated |
| Magritte Awards | Best Director | Valéry Rosier | Nominated |
| Magritte Awards | Best Supporting Actress | Julienne Goeffers | Nominated |
| Magritte Awards | Best First Feature Film | | Nominated |
| Magritte Awards | Best Cinematography | Olivier Boonjing | Won |
| Magritte Awards | Best Original Score | Cyrille de Haes, Manuel Roland | Won |
| Magritte Awards | Best Editing | Nicolas Rumpl | Nominated |
| San Sebastián International Film Festival | New Directors Award | Valéry Rosier | Nominated |
| Intercontinental Prize | Best Film | | Nominated |
| Intercontinental Prize | Technical Achievement | Valéry Rosier | Won |
