= Bitter Flowers (2017 film) =

2017 film by Olivier Meys

- Film poster
- Directed by: Olivier Meys
- Written by: Olivier Meys; Maarten Loix
- Starring: Chloe Maayan
- Release dates: 16 October 2017 (Busan); 28 March 2018
- Running time: 96 minutes
- Countries: Belgium; France; Switzerland; China
- Languages: French; Chinese

Bitter Flowers is a 2017 internationally co-produced drama film directed by Olivier Meys in his directorial debut. It was written by Meys with Maarten Loix. The film had its world premiere at the 22nd Busan International Film Festival. It was later screened at the Chicago International Film Festival and the Palm Springs International Film Festival before its theatrical release.

== Plot ==
35-year old Lina, has the dream of a better life, so she leaves her husband and son in China to go to Paris. She wants to find work as a nanny and hopes to make about 2.000 Euros a month, to paid for her travel expenses and help her family at home. However after her arrival she soon finds out that she can only make a fraction of what she thought and she is forced to work as a prostitute to send money to her family. She lies about what she does, since she does not to give up on her dream of opening her own restaurant. But when a young relative arrives in France, hoping for easy money in childcare the story she constructed starts to fall apart. Lina's despair about misjudging the situation and the personal struggle she puts up in order to make up for her initial mistake, are the elements that function as the red thread of this drama.

== Production ==
Filming took place in China, Paris and Rennes.

== Accolades ==
Bitter Flowers received four nominations at the 9th Magritte Awards, including Best Film and Best Director for Olivier Meys. It went on to win Best First Feature Film.

Award / Film Festival	Category	Recipients and nominees	Result
Busan International Film Festival	Audience Award		Nominated
Chicago International Film Festival	Gold Hugo		Nominated
Magritte Awards	Best Film		Nominated
Magritte Awards	Best Director	Olivier Meys	Nominated
Magritte Awards	Best Screenplay	Olivier Meys and Maarten Loix	Nominated
Magritte Awards	Best First Feature Film		Won
