= Guillaume Senez =

Belgian film director and screenwriter (born 1978)

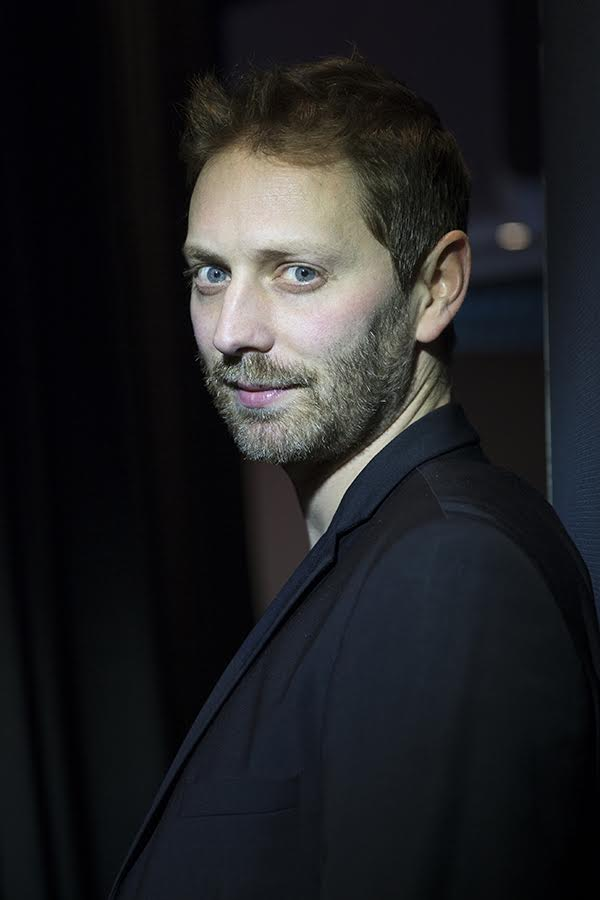
- Guillaume Senez in August 2016
- Born: 6 July 1978 (age 47); Uccle, Belgium
- Years active: 2006–present

Guillaume Senez (born 6 July 1978) is a Belgian film director and screenwriter. He studied at the National Institute of Radioelectricity and Cinematography (INRACI) in Brussels and graduated from there. He made his feature-length debut in 2015 with Keeper, which premiered at the 2015 Toronto International Film Festival. The film received eight nominations at the 7th Magritte Awards and won three, including Best First Feature Film.

His next film, Our Struggles (2018), was screened in the Critics' Week section at the 2018 Cannes Film Festival and released to critical acclaim. At the 9th Magritte Awards, it won five awards (the most for the event), including Best Film and Best Director for Senez.

== Filmography ==
- Keeper (2015)
- Our Struggles (2018)
- A Missing Part (2024)
