= Omen (2023 film) =

2023 Belgian film

- Theatrical release poster
- French: Augure
- Literally: Augury
- Directed by: Baloji
- Screenplay by: Baloji; Thomas van Zuylen
- Produced by: Benoit Roland
- Starring: Marc Zinga; Lucie Debay; Eliane Umuhire
- Cinematography: Joachim Philippe
- Edited by: Bertrand Conard; Bruno Tracq
- Music by: Liesa Van der Aa
- Production companies: Anonymous Films; Big World Cinema; New Amsterdam Film Company; Red Sea Film Festival Foundation; Versus Production; Serendipity Films; Tosala Films; Wrong Men North
- Distributed by: Imagine Film Distribution (Benelux); Pan Distribution (Pan-Européenne); Grandfilm (Germany)
- Release dates: 23 May 2023 (Cannes); 15 November 2023 (Belgium)
- Running time: 90 minutes
- Countries: Belgium; DR Congo; Netherlands; France; South Africa; Germany
- Language: French
- Box office: $29,696

Omen (French: Augure, lit. 'Augury') is a 2023 drama film written and directed by Belgian-Congolese director Baloji. Starring Marc Zinga, Lucie Debay and Eliane Umuhire, it premiered at Cannes in the Un Certain Regard section on 23 May 2023, where it won the New Voice Prize.

A co-production between Belgium, Democratic Republic of Congo, the Netherlands, France, Germany and South Africa, it was selected as the Belgian entry for Best International Feature Film at the 96th Academy Awards.

In 2023/24 movie director Baloji held the exhibition Baloji Augurism in the MOMU fashion museum in Antwerp, Belgium inspired by the traditional African costumes that he had designed for his film along with Elke Hoste.

== Premise ==
Congolese man Koffi was disowned by his mother in his youth for being a so-called "zabolo", Swahili for evil sorcerer. Now he returns to Congo from Europe to visit his family, along with his white pregnant girlfriend. The visit does not go well as the ancient rituals and persistent superstitions of the local tribes continue to haunt Koffi.

The film is divided into four chapters, loosely corresponding to each of the main characters' storylines: Koffi, Paco, Tshala and Mujila.

== Cast ==
- Marc Zinga: Koffi
- Lucie Debay: Alice, wife of Koffi
- Eliane Umuhire: Tshala
- Yves-Marina Gnahoua: Mama Mujila
- Marcel Otete Kabeya as Paco
- Denis Mpunga as Malage
- Bongeziwe Mabandla as Ezra
- Guetty Lembe as Bella Bello
- Linda Ikwa as Masekini
- Dylan Mata as Maky
- Romain Barthez as Abel / Dr. Phileasfog
- Mordecai Kamangu as Simba
- Olive Mfumu Ntonto as Maya

== Production ==
The head director and screenwriter is the Belgian-Congolese Baloji, also known as the music artist of Starflam, among others. The company Wrong Men produced the film. The production budget was 1 million euros. The film received financial support from the VRT, the RTBF, the Centre du cinéma de la Fédération Wallonie-Bruxelles, screen.brussels, the Dutch Audiovisual Fund and the Federal Tax Service, among others. Filming lasted 23 days and took place at 18 different locations. Augure was released in Belgian theaters on November 15, 2023, and is distributed internationally under the name Omen.

== Release ==
Omen had its premiere at 2023 Cannes Film Festival in 'Un Certain Regard' on 23 May 2023. It was invited to Horizons section of 57th Karlovy Vary International Film Festival, where it was screened on 30 June 2023. It was screened at the 2023 Festival du nouveau cinéma in International Panorama on 8 October, then at 2023 BFI London Film Festival in 'Strand' section under 'Dare' theme on 12 October.

Omen was released in Belgium cinemas on 15 November 2023 by Imagine Film.

== Reception ==
On the review aggregator website Rotten Tomatoes website, the film has an approval rating of 83% based on 18 reviews, with an average rating of 7.4/10. The critics' consensus reads: "Visually striking and hauntingly surreal, Omen makes up in mesmerizing imagery and ambition whatever it lacks in narrative legibility."

Peter Bradshaw of The Guardian gave the film a score of four out of five stars, writing that the film explores and deconstructs the concept of a culture clash: "culture, heritage, nationality and identity are all shapeshifting concepts here. Perhaps Omen doesn't completely hang together but it is bold, risky, exciting film-making." Rue Morgue's Michelle Martin praised the film's performances and visuals, and called it, "[a] stunning exploration of Congolese cultural beliefs posits that things that we deem 'occult' exist on the same plane as that which we view as 'scientific,' and the result is captivating."

Peyton Robinson of RogerEbert.com gave the film three out of four stars, calling it "a visually enthralling piece of magical realism proposing ideas on pariahs, culture, and individuality in a world with constantly changing rules. But in devoting so much work to the aesthetic, it falls behind in making sense of its phantasmagoric storylines." Beatrice Loayza of The New York Times characterized the film as ambitious, highlighting its "vivid symbolism" and, "In its best moments, a quiet element of absurdity [that] grounds the spectacle", but lamenting that "the film's frenetic world-building eventually becomes numbing, in part because the uneven human dramas—each one offers a vague message about marginalization—lose momentum in all the commotion."

== Awards ==
- Cannes Film Festival 2023: "New voice" film prize, side competition Uncertain regard
- Filmfest München: winner of the CineRebels competition
- Durban International Film Festival (South Africa): best African feature film
- Festival du film francophone d'Angoulême: Bilaji, best director
- 56th Sitges Film Festival: Best Direction: Baloji Tshiani.

| Award | Date of ceremony | Category | Recipient(s) | Result | Ref. |
|---|---|---|---|---|---|
| Magritte Awards | 9 March 2024 | Best Supporting Actress (Note: Shared with Sandrine Blancke for Love According to Dalva.) | Yves-Marina Gnahoua | Won | |
| Magritte Awards | 9 March 2024 | Best Cinematography | Joachim Philippe | Won | |
| Magritte Awards | 9 March 2024 | Best Production Design | Eve Martin | Won | |
| Magritte Awards | 9 March 2024 | Best Costume Design | Elke Hoste and Baloji | Won | |
| Magritte Awards | 9 March 2024 | Best Original Score | Baloji | Won | |
| Magritte Awards | 9 March 2024 | Best Film | Omen | Nominated | |
| Magritte Awards | 9 March 2024 | Best Director | Baloji | Nominated | |
| Magritte Awards | 9 March 2024 | Best Actor | Marc Zinga | Nominated | |
| Magritte Awards | 9 March 2024 | Best Supporting Actress | Lucie Debay | Nominated | |
| Magritte Awards | 9 March 2024 | Best Screenplay | Baloji | Nominated | |
| Magritte Awards | 9 March 2024 | Best First Feature Film | Omen | Nominated | |
| Magritte Awards | 9 March 2024 | Best Sound | Jan Deca, Erik Griekspoor, Danny van Spreuwel and Vincent Nouaille | Nominated | |
| Magritte Awards | 9 March 2024 | Best Editing | Bruno Tracq and Bertrand Conard | Nominated | |

== See also ==
- Congolese cinema
- List of submissions to the 96th Academy Awards for Best International Feature Film
- List of Belgian submissions for the Academy Award for Best International Feature Film
