= Charline Vanhoenacker =

Belgian journalist

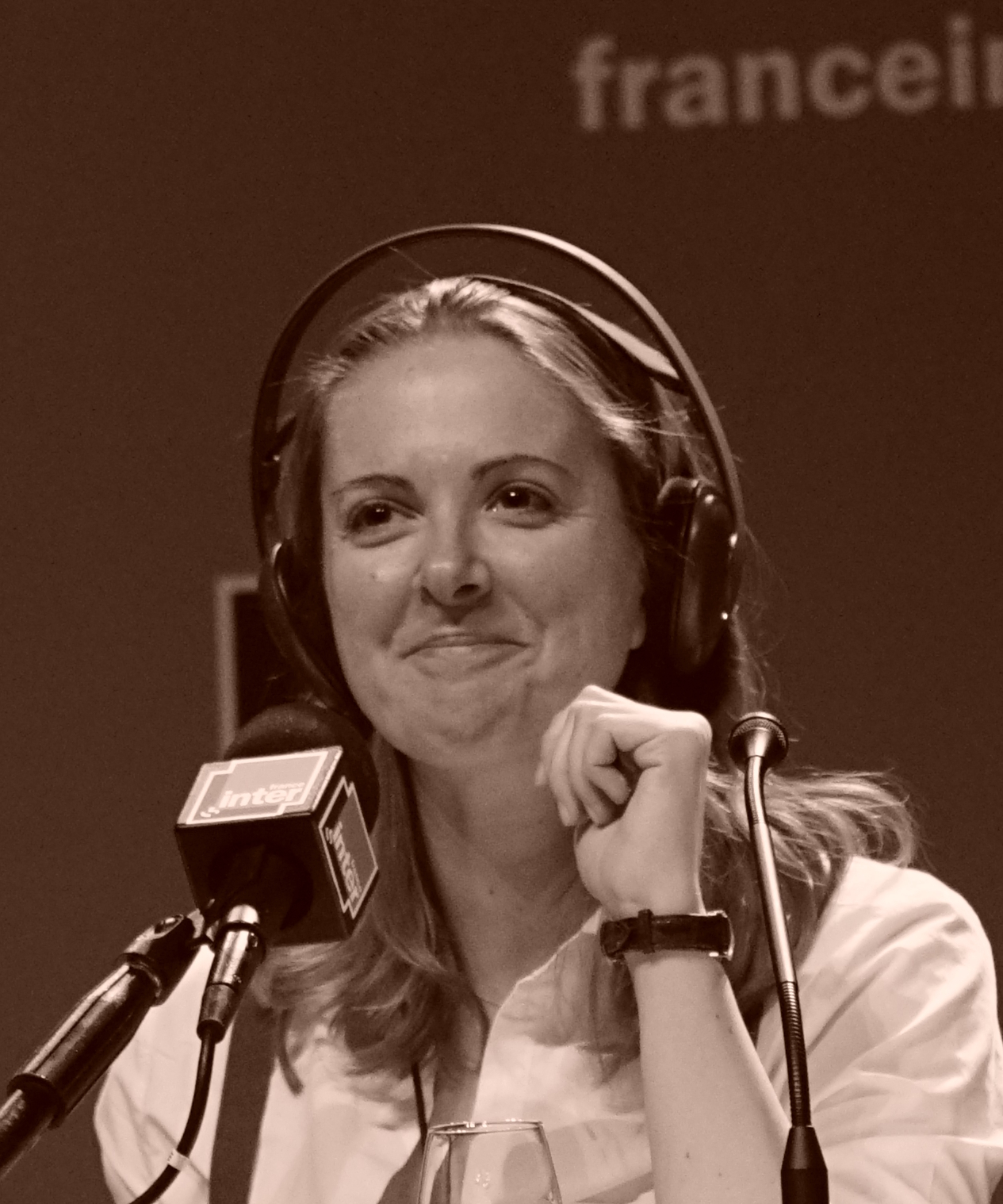
- Charline Vanhoenacker in 2016.
- Born: December 31, 1977 (age 48); La Louvière, Belgium
- Education: Université libre de Bruxelles
- Occupations: Journalist, humorist, radio host and producer
- Years active: 2010 - present
- Employer: France Inter
- Known for: radio shows about politics and current affairs

Charline Vanhoenacker (French: [ʃaʁlin vanunakœʁ]; born 31 December 1977 in La Louvière, Belgium) is a Belgian francophone journalist, humorist, radio host and producer. Known since 2012 both in Belgium and France for her popular radio shows, marked by political satire, left-wing tendencies and occasional controversies, she has been called "the most famous Belgian humorist in France."

== Life and career ==
Vanhoenacker's parents were teachers at the secondary school at La Louvière, where she was born and completed her school years. Her childhood in the industrial centre of Belgium had a profound impact on her and gave her a firsthand view of the upheavals of deindustrialization. In a 2020 interview she commented: “The region where I come from, […], a region of metallurgy and coal mining, […] is called La Louvière. It is an industrial and mining area that I saw decline throughout my childhood, comparable to Roubaix or Florange. This is my breeding ground, so I read politics and society through this prism."

After studies of French literature at the Université libre de Bruxelles, she obtained a degree in journalism from the École supérieure de journalisme de Paris. Her master's thesis explored the language of humour in Belgian humorist Philippe Geluck's comic strip “Le Chat.”

=== Beginnings at Belgian and French media ===
Having started her professional career at Le Soir news magazine in Belgium as a freelance writer, she changed to Belgium's French-language public broadcaster RTBF in 2010 as their correspondent in Paris. In 2012, she covered the campaign with growing success for the 2012 French presidential election for La Première radio station. Following this, French journalist Daniel Schneidermann invited her to also cover the presidential campaign for his online magazine Arrêt sur images.

=== Radio shows for France Inter ===
Starting in 2012, Vanhoenacker became a columnist for France Inter, one of the country's most popular radio stations, where she has hosted and produced popular daily radio shows. Apart from herself as host, the shows have featured guest hosts such as fellow Belgian comedian and writer Alex Vizorek, Clara Dupont-Monod, Nicole Ferroni, Thomas Bidegain, Hippolyte Girardot, Roukiata Ouedraogo and others. These shows and its columnists have been considered by observers to favour left-wing attitudes. On this, Vanhoenacker commented that she prefers progressive political views and that she would vote for "a not-too-corrupt socialist, or a pragmatic green politician."

Her radio shows have been known for their ironical comments on politicians and often sparked controversy. Apart from rising popularity, this led to the highest number of complaints to the Superior Audiovisual Council (CSA) in 2020, all media combined. The CSA, however, declared on several occasions that the comments made in the programmes "cannot be considered as exceeding the limits of freedom of expression." In 2020, Vanhoenacker's daily show By Jupiter! (referring to French president Emmanuel Macron) was enjoying growing success and had an audience of 1.3 million listeners per day on average. At the end of 2023, after her morning show had run for eight years, she had to stop after protests and death threats concerning a controversial sketch about Benjamin Netanyahu by her colleague Guillaume Meurice. On 23 June 2024, she further announced that France Inter had decided to end her satirical evening show Le Grand Dimanche soir that had been running for ten years. On the other hand, she was confirmed for her weekly show Bistroscopie and for a new morning show starting in August 2024.

=== Other activities as journalist ===
From 2016 to 2017, Vanhoenacker hosted a humoristic programme at the end of L'Émission politique on French public TV channel France 2. In 2019, she became the co-editor of Siné Madame, a satirical companion magazine written and designed by women authors for French illustrated Siné Mensuel magazine, founded by French cartoonist Siné.

== Publications ==
In 2015, Vanhoenacker published a collection of her radio commentaries titled Bonjour la France (Good morning, France). For this, she chose 80 essays out of more than 600 of her morning shows at France Inter that are supposed to "stand the test of time". In Debout les damnés de l'Uber (Rise, you damned by Uber), published in 2020, she presented 80 satirical essays about life in the 21st century, including consumer culture, unemployment, the precarious conditions of people working for ride-sharing and delivery companies, as well as other aspects of modern life she compared to a rat race.

Further, she authored illustrated books dealing with political humour, the French president and everyday topics such as vacations.

- Bonjour la France. Paris: éditions Robert Laffont. 2015. ISBN 978-2-221-19028-9.
- with Guillaume Meurice, Cami (illustrations) (2019). Le cahier de vacances de Manu : monsieur le président de la République. Paris: Flammarion. ISBN 978-2-08-148144-2.
- Debout les damnés de l'Uber. Paris: éditions Denoël. 2020. ISBN 978-2-207-15946-0.
- Le cahier de vacances de Manu: monsieur le président de la République (vol. 2). Paris: Flammarion. 2020.
- Aux vannes, citoyens! Petit essai d'humour politique. Paris: Denoël. 2022. ISBN 978-2207165201.
- with Lecoq, Titiou; Thouron, Zoé (illustrations) (2023). En vacances, Simone!. Paris: Denoël. ISBN 978-2-207-16955-1.
