= François Damiens =

Belgian actor

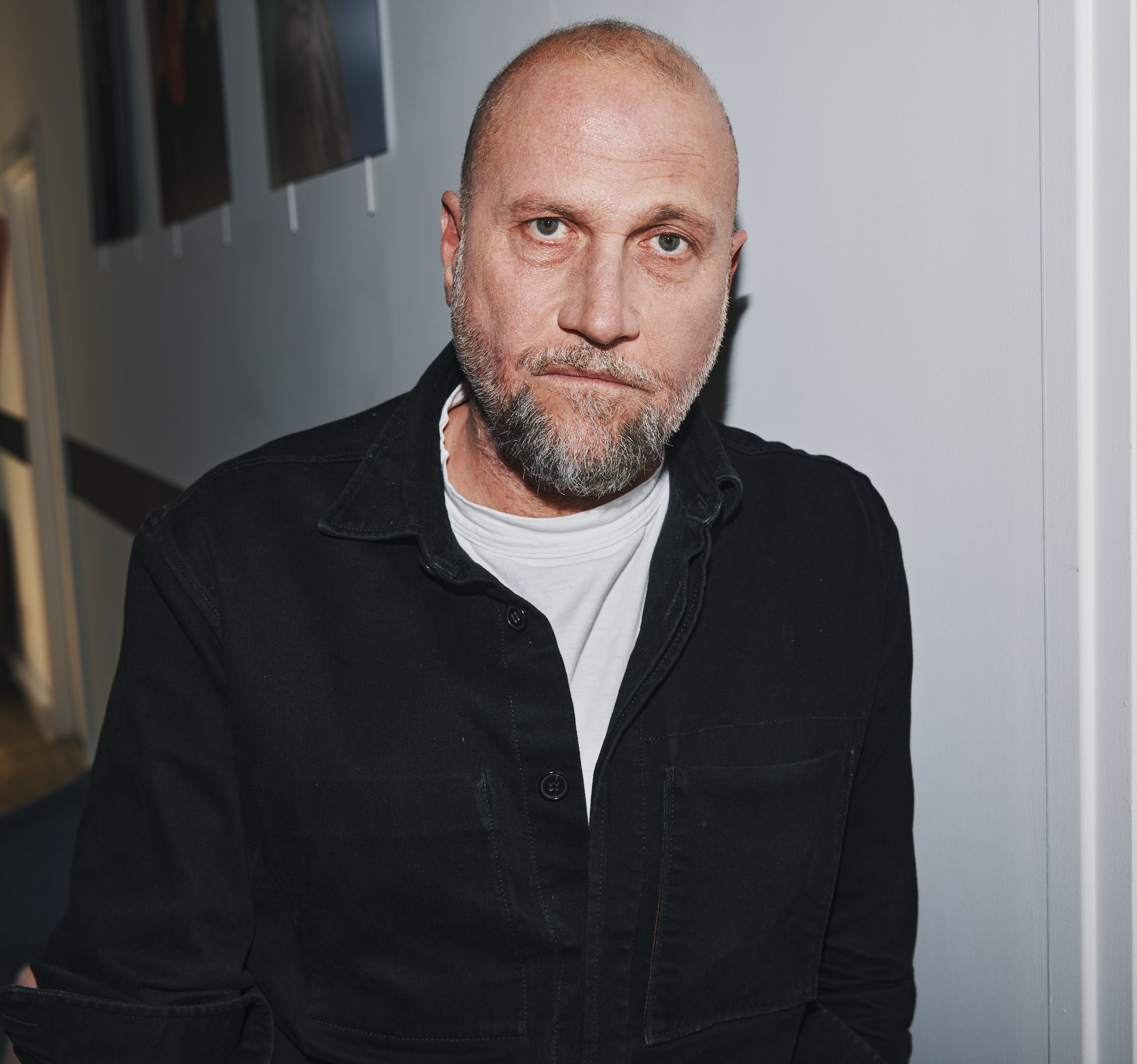
- Damiens at the 2024 Cannes Film Festival
- Born: François Georges Henri Marie Ghislain Joseph Damiens; 17 January 1973 (age 53); Uccle, Brussels-Capital, Belgium
- Occupations: Actor, comedian, media personality
- Years active: 2000–present
- Children: 2

François Georges Henri Marie Ghislain Joseph Damiens (French: [damjɛ̃s]; born 17 January 1973) is a Belgian actor, comedian, and media personality.

== Career ==
Damiens has appeared in more than 50 films since 2000. He started his career doing hidden camera videos in the 90s and became widely popular in Belgium. He had to stop filming in 2004 because he could no longer perform without being recognized. He then moved to France to continue with his work. There, as well as in Switzerland, Damiens acquired a certain celebrity thanks to the dissemination of his hoaxes on Canal+ and on the wider internet.

He made his directorial feature debut in 2018 with the drama film Mon Ket.

== Personal life ==
Damiens has two sons named Jack and Jimmy. He is trilingual, speaking French, Dutch, and English.

== Filmography ==
Year	Title	Role	Director	Notes
2000	La Commune (Paris, 1871)	Repairman Guns	Peter Watkins	
2001	Le grand jeu	Thomas	Étienne Dhaene	TV movie
2006	Dikkenek	Claudy	Olivier Van Hoofstadt	
2006	OSS 117: Cairo, Nest of Spies	Raymond Pelletier	Michel Hazanavicius	
2007	Taxi 4	Serge	Gérard Krawczyk	
2007	Cow-Boy	Franz	Benoît Mariage	
2007	Surprise !	The fleurist	Fabrice Maruca	Short
2007	Mariage surprise	Marciano	Arnaud Sélignac	TV movie
2008	JCVD	Bruges	Mabrouk El Mechri	
2008	Me Two	Doctor Cogip	Nicolas & Bruno	
2008	2 Alone in Paris	The captain of the opposing curling team	Éric Judor & Ramzy Bedia	
2008	15 ans et demi	Jean-Maxence	François Desagnat & Thomas Sorriaux	
2008	Behind the Walls	The Chief Officer	Christian Faure	
2008	Le premier venu	Real Estate Dealer	Jacques Doillon	
2008	Trouble at Timpetill	The delivery guy	Nicolas Bary	
2009	Incognito	The driver	Éric Lavaine	
2009	Little Nicholas	Blédur	Laurent Tirard	
2009	La famille Wolberg	Simon	Axelle Ropert	
2010	Heartbreaker	Marc	Pascal Chaumeil	Nominated – César Award for Best Supporting Actor; Nominated – Magritte Award for Best Supporting Actor
2010	Protéger & servir	Roméro	Éric Lavaine	
2010	Nothing to Declare	Jacques Janus	Dany Boon	
2011	Delicacy	Markus Lundell	David & Stéphane Foenkinos	Sarlat International Cinema Festival – Best Actor
2011	Une pure affaire	David Pelame	Alexandre Coffre	Alpe d'Huez International Comedy Film Festival – Best Acting
2011	Holidays by the Sea	Monsieur Fraises	Pascal Rabaté	
2012	Torpedo	Michel Ressac	Matthieu Donck	
2012	Tango libre	Jean-Christophe	Frédéric Fonteyne	Nominated – Magritte Award for Best Actor
2012	Porn in the Hood	Claude Fachoune	Franck Gastambide	
2013	Tip Top	Robert Mendès	Serge Bozon	
2013	Suzanne	Nicolas Merevsky	Katell Quillévéré	Thessaloniki International Film Festival – Special Artistic Achievement; Nominated – César Award for Best Supporting Actor; Nominated – Magritte Award for Best Supporting Actor
2013	Playing Dead	Jean Renault	Jean-Paul Salomé	Nominated – Magritte Award for Best Actor
2013	Gare du Nord	Sacha	Claire Simon	
2014	La Famille Bélier	Rodolphe Bélier	Éric Lartigau	Nominated – César Award for Best Actor; Nominated – Globes de Cristal Award for Best Actor; Nominated – Magritte Award for Best Actor
2015	Les Cowboys	Alain Balland	Thomas Bidegain	Nominated – César Award for Best Actor; Nominated – Magritte Award for Best Actor
2015	The Brand New Testament	François	Jaco Van Dormael	
2016	The Jews	Roger	Yvan Attal	
2016	The Dancer	Edouard Marchand	Stéphanie Di Giusto	
2016	News from Planet Mars	Philippe Mars	Dominik Moll	
2017	Just to Be Sure	Erwan Gourmelon	Carine Tardieu	Nominated – Globes de Cristal Award for Best Actor; Nominated – Magritte Award for Best Actor
2017	Le petit Spirou	Monsieur Mégot	Nicolas Bary	
2018	Mon Ket	Daniel "Dany" Versavel	Himself	Nominated – Magritte Award for Best Film; Nominated – Magritte Award for Best Actor
2018	The World Is Yours	René	Romain Gavras	
2019	Fourmi	Laurent	Julien Rappeneau	
2020	Mon cousin	Adrien Pastié	Jan Kounen	
2020	Le prince oublié	Pritprout	Michel Hazanavicius	
2020	Le bonheur des uns...	Francis Léger	Daniel Cohen	
2021	Adieu Paris		Édouard Baer	
2021	Stuck Together	Tony	Dany Boon	
2021	Cette musique ne joue pour personne		Samuel Benchetrit	
2022	En même temps	The diner owner	Benoît Delépine & Gustave Kervern	
2024	The Art of Nothing	Claude Fouasse	Stefan Liberski	
2026	Le Faux Soir		Michaël R. Roskam	

== Dubbing ==
Year	Title	Role
2009	Suske en Wiske: De Texas rakkers	Sherif
2011	The Rabbi's Cat	The reporter
2012	A Turtle's Tale 2: Sammy's Escape from Paradise	Phillippe
2016	The Secret Life of Pets	Duke
