= Savina Dellicour =

Belgian film director and screenwriter

Dellicour in 2026

Savina Dellicour is a Belgian film director and screenwriter. She made her feature-length debut in 2014 with All Cats Are Grey, which premiered at the 32nd Turin Film Festival. The film received nine nominations at the 6th Magritte Awards, including Best Film and Best Director for Dellicour. All Cats Are Grey also screened as a special presentation during the 2015 Santa Barbara International Film Festival, where it won Best International Film.
