= Olivier Meys =

Belgian film director and screenwriter

Olivier Meys is a Belgian film director and screenwriter. He studied film and radio production at the Institute of Broadcasting Arts in Belgium and graduated from there in 2000. His first works were short films and documentary films which earned him the First Film Prize at the 2005 Clermont-Ferrand Film Festival and the Scam International Prize at the 2008 Cinéma du Réel. He made his feature-length debut in 2017 with Bitter Flowers. The film received four nominations at the 9th Magritte Awards, including Best Film and Best Director for Meys.
