= Lucie Debay =

Belgian actress

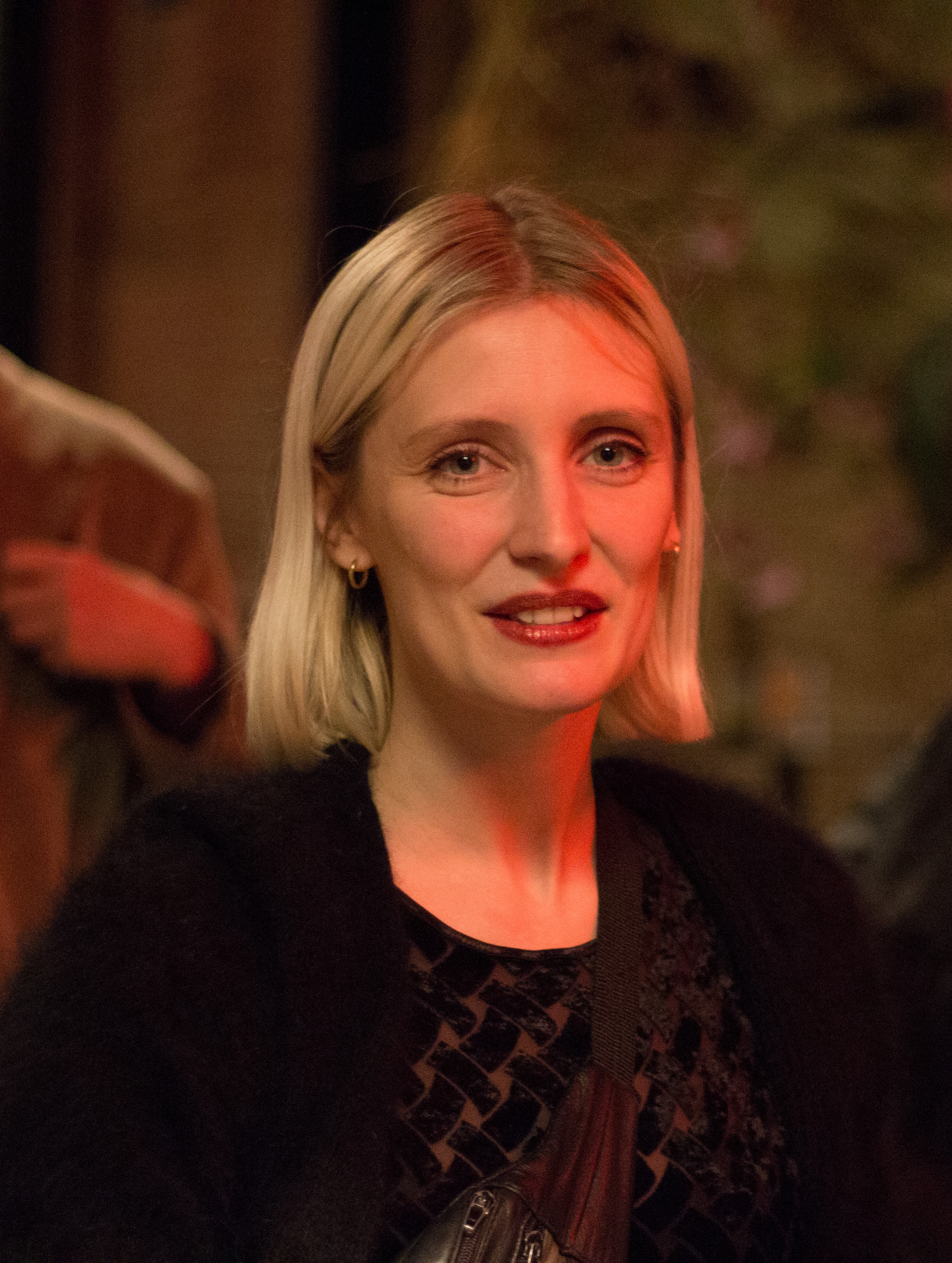
- Debay in January 2020
- Born: 2 March 1985 (age 41); Le Mans, France
- Education: Institut Supérieur des Arts
- Years active: 2009–present

Lucie Debay is a Belgian-French actress who has appeared in film, television and theatre.

== Career ==
After developing an interest in acting, Debay enrolled at the INSAS Film School in Brussels and graduated from there in 2009. She later began working in theatre and appeared in productions by directors such as Falk Richter, Armel Roussel, and Jean-Baptiste Calame. She also appears in films – her credits include Before the Winter Chill (2013), French Blood (2015), King of the Belgians (2016), Our Struggles (2018), Cleo (2018), Madly in Life (2020) and Augure (2023).

For her role in Melody (2014), Debay was awarded the Magritte Award for Most Promising Actress.

== Selected filmography ==
Year	Title	Role	Notes
2013	Before the Winter Chill	Lou's friend	
2014	Melody	Melody	Magritte Award for Most Promising Actress; Montreal World Film Festival Award for Best Actress
2015	French Blood	Corinne	
2016	King of the Belgians	Louise	Nominated—Magritte Award for Best Actress
2018	Our Struggles	Laura	Jean Carmet Award for Best Supporting Actress; Magritte Award for Best Supporting Actress
2018	Cleo	Jeanne	
2019	The Barefoot Emperor	Louise	
2020	Hunted	Eve	
2020	Madly in Life	Noémie	Nominated—Magritte Award for Best Actress
2021	Our Men	Lucie	
2023	Clenched Fist	Lucie	
2023	Omen	Alice	
2023	The Experience of Love	Sandra	Nominated—Magritte Award for Best Actress
