= Amer (film) =

2009 film by Hélène Cattet and Bruno Forzani

- Theatrical release poster
- Directed by: Hélène Cattet; Bruno Forzani
- Written by: Hélène Cattet; Bruno Forzani
- Produced by: Eve Commenge; François Cognard
- Starring: Cassandra Forêt; Charlotte Eugène Guibeaud; Marie Bos; Bianca Maria D'Amato; Harry Cleven; Jean-Michel Vovk; Delphine Brual; Bernard Marbaix; Thomas Bonzani
- Cinematography: Manu Dacosse
- Edited by: Bernard Beets
- Music by: Bruno Nicolai; Stelvio Cipriani; Ennio Morricone
- Production companies: Anonymes Films; Tobina Film
- Distributed by: Zootrope Films (France); Coopérative Nouveau Cinéma (Belgium)
- Release dates: 23 September 2009 (LIFFF); 3 March 2010 (France); 28 April 2010 (Belgium)
- Running time: 90 minutes
- Countries: France; Belgium
- Language: French

Amer (lit. 'Bitter') is a 2009 experimental psychological horror drama film written and directed by Hélène Cattet and Bruno Forzani and starring Cassandra Forêt, Charlotte Eugène Guibeaud and Marie Bos. The film is a giallo in three parts. The plot of the film follows the sexual development of Ana who lives on the French Riviera. The film focuses on her oppressive teenage years leading to her womanhood. The film premiered at the 2009 Lund International Fantastic Film Festival in Sweden. It received generally favourable reviews and was nominated for the Magritte Award for Best Film.

== Plot ==
Three important moments, all sensual, define Ana's life. Her mundane quests oscillate between reality and chromatic fantasy... becoming more and more oppressive. Black roped hands prevented her from screaming. The wind lifted her dress and caressed her thighs. Razors brush against her skin: where will this chaotic, carnivorous journey leave her ?

== Cast ==
- Cassandra Forêt as Ana (child)
- Charlotte Eugène Guibeaud (credited as Charlotte Eugène Guibbaud) as Ana (teenager)
- Marie Bos as Ana (adult)
- Delphine Brual as Graziella
- Harry Cleven as Taximan
- Bianca Maria D'Amato as the Mother
- Bernard Marbaix as the dead grandfather
- Jean-Michel Vovk as the father

== Production ==
To fund the film's production, Belgian producer Eve Commenge created a company to produce Amer. Directors Hélène Cattet and Bruno Forzani required more funding outside Belgium and searched for a French co-producer. Producer François Cognard agreed to co-produce the film. The directors found that they only had one third of their original budget, but the producers let them start production regardless based on their experience of making short films for very little money.

The directors took great preparations before shooting the actors due to the film's low budget. All shots in the film were tested with digital video cameras with the two directors playing all the parts so that nothing unexpected would come up when they began filming with the other actors. The film was shot at the French Riviera and in Belgium. It took 39 days to shoot.

== Release ==
Amer had its world premiere at the 2009 Lund International Fantastic Film Festival in Sweden, where it won the inaugural The Blade award. The film was screened at other film festivals as well, including the Sitges Film Festival in Spain, where the directors won the award for Discovery Motion Picture Diploma. It was released theatrically in France on 3 March 2010 by Zootrope Films and in Belgium on 28 April 2010 by Coopérative Nouveau Cinéma.

== Reception ==
Amer was well received by American critics on its original release. On the review aggregator website Rotten Tomatoes, the film holds an approval rating of 79% based on 28 reviews, with an average rating of 6.8/10. Metacritic, which uses a weighted average, assigned the film a score of 72 out of 100, based on seven reviews, indicating "generally favorable" reviews. Ella Taylor of the Village Voice gave the film a positive review, stating, "The pleasures of this gorgeous, clever, and visceral film are almost exclusively aesthetic" as well as "that those unmoved or alienated by the porn of pain may be left flopping as nervelessly as one of the movie's severed limbs." Kevin Thomas of the Los Angeles Times referred to the film as "Consistently outrageous and relentlessly surreal, the Belgian film is, intentionally or not, frequently funny; it's also compelling and distinctive." Sam Toy of Empire gave the film three out of five stars, recommending it for fans of Dario Argento.
