= Our Struggles =

- Film poster
- Directed by: Guillaume Senez
- Produced by: Isabelle Truc; Philippe Martin; David Thion
- Starring: Romain Duris; Laure Calamy; Laetitia Dosch; Lucie Debay
- Edited by: Julie Brenta
- Release dates: 13 May 2018 (Cannes); 3 October 2018
- Running time: 95 minutes
- Countries: Belgium; France
- Language: French
- Box office: $1.7 million

Our Struggles (French: Nos batailles) is a 2018 Belgian-French comedy-drama film directed by Guillaume Senez. It was screened in the Critics' Week section at the 2018 Cannes Film Festival. It received seven nominations at the 9th Magritte Awards and won five (the most for the event), including Best Film and Best Director for Guillaume Senez.

== Cast ==
- Romain Duris as Olivier
- Laure Calamy as Claire
- Laetitia Dosch as Betty
- Lucie Debay as Laura
- Basile Grunberger as Elliot
- Lena Girard Voss as Rose
- Dominique Valadié as Joëlle

== Accolades ==
Award / Film Festival	Category	Recipients and nominees	Result
César Awards	Best Actor	Romain Duris	Nominated
César Awards	Best Foreign Film		Nominated
Filmfest Hamburg	Critics' Choice Award		Won
Globe de Cristal Awards	Best Actor	Romain Duris	Nominated
Jean Carmet Award	Best Supporting Actress	Lucie Debay	Won
Magritte Awards	Best Film		Won
Magritte Awards	Best Director	Guillaume Senez	Won
Magritte Awards	Best Screenplay	Guillaume Senez	Nominated
Magritte Awards	Best Supporting Actress	Lucie Debay	Won
Magritte Awards	Most Promising Actor	Basile Grunberger	Nominated
Magritte Awards	Most Promising Actress	Lena Girard Voss	Won
Magritte Awards	Best Editing	Julie Brenta	Won
International Film Festival of India	Best Film		Nominated
Lumière Awards	Best French-Language Film		Nominated
Lumière Awards	Best Actor	Romain Duris	Nominated
Torino Film Festival	Best Film		Nominated
Torino Film Festival	Interfedi Award	Guillaume Senez	Won
Torino Film Festival	Audience Award		Won
