= Insyriated =

2017 film

- Film poster
- Directed by: Philippe Van Leeuw
- Written by: Philippe Van Leeuw
- Starring: Hiam Abbass
- Release date: 11 February 2017 (Berlin)
- Running time: 85 minutes
- Country: Belgium
- Language: Arabic

Insyriated, released in some territories as In Syria, is a 2017 Belgian drama film directed by Philippe Van Leeuw. It was screened in the Panorama section at the 67th Berlin International Film Festival, where it won the Panorama Audience Award. At the 8th Magritte Awards, the film won all six awards it was nominated for, including Best Film and Best Director for Van Leeuw.

== Cast ==
- Hiam Abbass as Oum Yazan
- Diamand Bou Abboud as Halima
- Juliette Navis as Delhani
- Mohsen Abbas as Abou Monzer
- Husam Chadat

== Reception ==
=== Critical reception ===
On review aggregator website Rotten Tomatoes, the film holds an approval rating of 89% based on 45 reviews, and an average rating of 9/10. The website's critics consensus reads: "Limited in setting but impressive in scope, In Syria uses one group's experiences to offer a brilliantly effective indictment of the horrors of war."

This movie is based on true events.

=== Accolades ===
Award / Film Festival	Category	Recipients and nominees	Result
Berlin International Film Festival	Panorama Audience Award		Won
Lumière Awards
Lumière Awards	Best French-Language Film		Won
Lumière Awards	Best Actress	Hiam Abbass	Nominated
Magritte Awards	Best Film		Won
Magritte Awards	Best Director	Philippe Van Leeuw	Won
Magritte Awards	Best Screenplay	Philippe Van Leeuw	Won
Magritte Awards	Best Cinematography	Virginie Surdej	Won
Magritte Awards	Best Original Score	Jean-Luc Fafchamps	Won
Magritte Awards	Best Sound	Paul Heymans and Alek Gosse	Won
World Soundtrack Awards	Best Original Score	Jean-Luc Fafchamps	Nominated
