= Alex Vizorek =

Belgian television host, comedian, writer, and radio personality

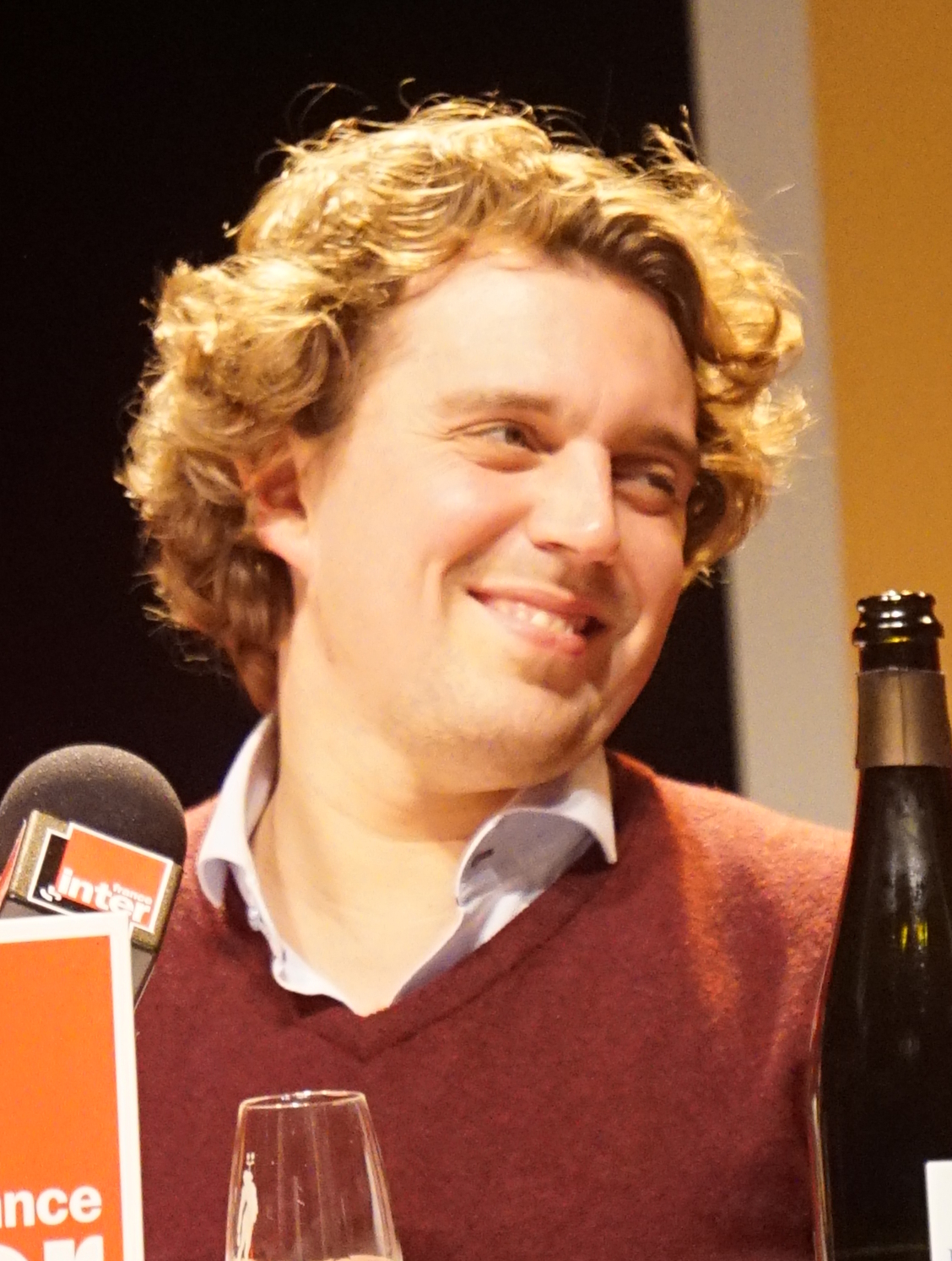
- Vizorek in October 2016
- Born: Alexandre Wieczoreck; 21 September 1981 (age 44); Brussels, Belgium
- Education: Université libre de Bruxelles

Comedy career
- Medium: Stand-up; television; radio; books
- Website: www.alexvizorek.com/

Alex Vizorek (born Alexandre Wieczoreck; 21 September 1981) is a Belgian television host, comedian, writer, and radio personality.

Vizorek was born on 21 September 1981 in Brussels, Belgium and grew up in the Borinage. His paternal grandfather was a Polish immigrant to Belgium. He graduated from Lycée Dachsbeck and then attended Université libre de Bruxelles, studying both commercial engineering and journalism. After graduation, Vizorek enrolled at the Cours Florent, where he studied stand-up comedy.

In 2009, Vizorek joined the theatre group Kings of Comedy and was featured in the Made In Brussels Show. At the 2009 Montreux Comedy Festival, his show Alex Vizorek est une œuvre d'art received the François Silvant Award. Vizorek began working in the radio industry, hosting a radio show on Bel RTL covering football games.

He went on to host his own shows at Belgian radio stations VivaCité and La Première, was a guest host for radio shows produced by Charline Vanhoenacker for France Inter from 2012 to 2014, and started writing for L'Echo and Le Soir. On 24 August 2018, it was announced that Vizorek would host the 9th Magritte Awards.
