= Torpedo (2012 film) =

2012 film directed by Matthieu Donck

- Directed by: Matthieu Donck
- Starring: François Damiens; Audrey Dana
- Release date: 2012
- Countries: France; Belgium
- Language: French

Torpedo is a 2012 French-Belgian comedy film directed by Matthieu Donck.

== Plot ==
Michel Ressac wins a dinner with cyclist legend Eddy Merckx in an advertising campaign to promote the sales of sofas and hopes that he can do his own father, who is a huge cycling fan, a favour. But unfortunately he arrives too late at the dinner. Ressac then tries to reclaim his prize and win his family's sympathy back...

== Cast ==
- François Damiens as Michel Ressac
- Audrey Dana as Christine
- Cédric Constantin as Kevin
- Christian Charmetant as Pascal Dumont
- Gustave de Kervern as Garage owner
- Eddy Merckx as himself
- Jasmina Douieb as Saleswoman
