= Magritte Awards =

Belgian film award

- Current: 15th René Awards
- Awarded for: Excellence in cinematic achievements
- Country: Belgium
- Presented by: Académie André Delvaux
- First award: 2011
- Website: lesmagritteducinema.com

A Magritte Award (French: Magritte du cinéma, pronounced [maɡʁit dy sinema]), also known as René, is an accolade presented by the Académie André Delvaux of Belgium to recognize cinematic achievement in the film industry. Modelled after the French César Award, the formal ceremony at which the awards are presented is one of the most prominent award ceremonies in Belgium. The various category winners are awarded a copy of a statuette. The awards, first presented in 2011, are considered the Belgian equivalent of the Academy Awards in the United States.

Historically given during the first quarter of the new year, the awards honor achievements for cinematic accomplishments for the preceding year. The 15th René Awards ceremony was held on 7 March 2026 at the Flagey, in the historic site of Place Eugène Flagey, Ixelles.

== History ==
Founded in 2010, the Académie André Delvaux was established at the request of the Francophone Film Producers Association (UPFF) and Pro Spère, to unite the five branches of the film industry, including actors, directors, producers, technicians and writers. The Académie aims to recognize excellence in Belgian cinematic achievements in order to have a Belgian counterpart to the César Awards of France. After the cancellation of the Joseph Plateau Awards ceremony, which was absorbed into the Film Fest Ghent in 2007, a national film award was missing in Belgium. This led the Académie André Delvaux to establish the Magritte Award. An accolade for artistic and technical merit in the Flemish film industry was launched a year earlier as part of the Ostend Film Festival and called Ensor Award.

The name of the award came from the painter René Magritte. Charly Herscovici, who created the Magritte Foundation, allowed the Académie to use the name of the artist. The awarding statuette was created by designer and sculptor Xavier Lust, who drew inspiration from a poster entitled Moments inoubliables du cinema created by René Magritte in 1958 for a film festival. The 1st Magritte Awards ceremony took place on 5 February 2011 at the Square Meeting Centre in Brussels. During the ceremony, the Académie André Delvaux presented Magritte Awards in twenty categories. Film director Jaco Van Dormael presided the ceremony, while actress Helena Noguerra hosted the evening. The ceremony, televised in Belgium by BeTV, was produced by José Bouquiaux and directed by Vincent J. Gustin.

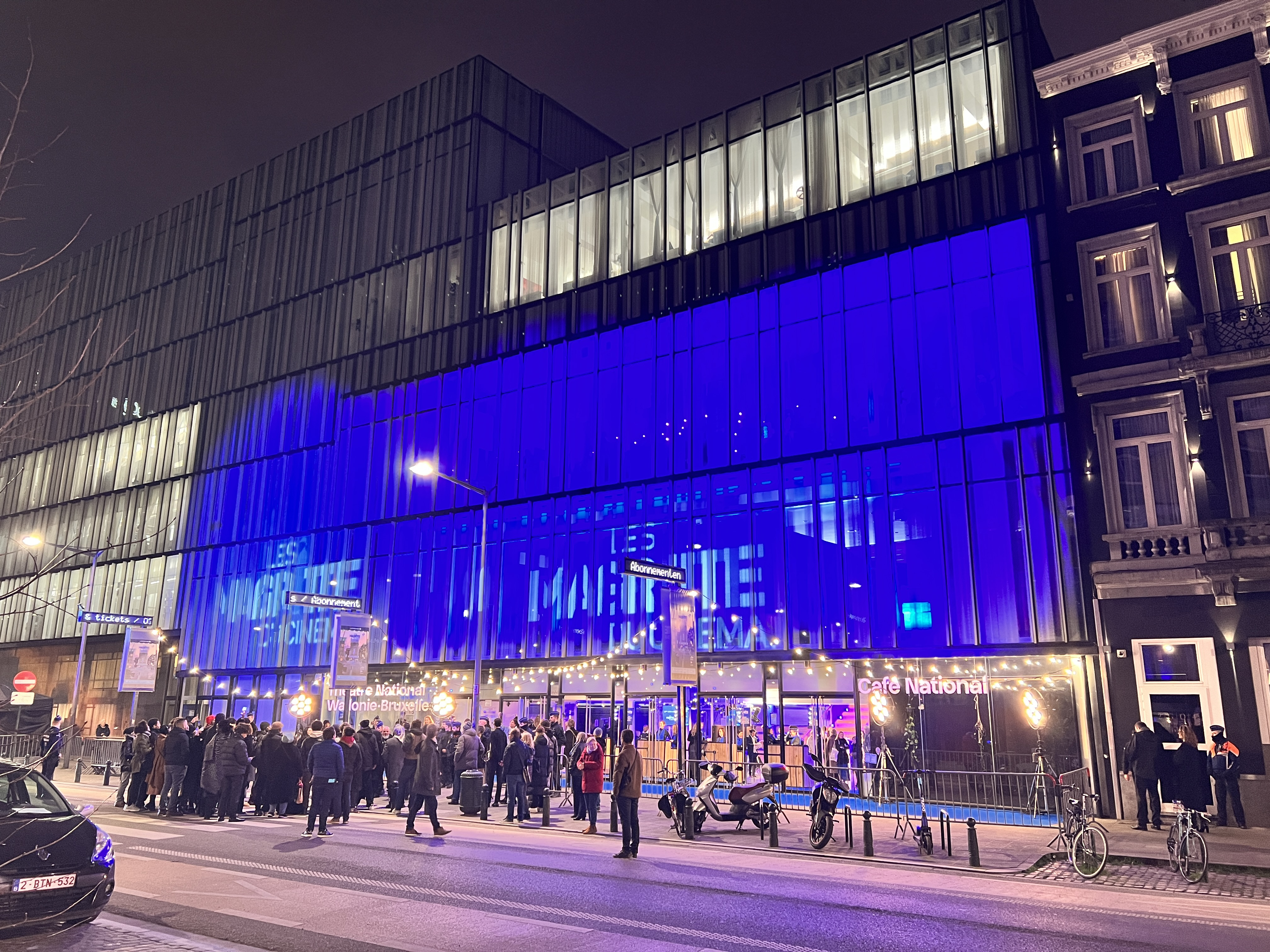
The Théâtre National Wallonie-Bruxelles on 4 July 2023, during the ceremonie of the Magritte Awards.

At the 2nd ceremony, held on 4 February 2012, the Magritte Award for Best Film in Coproduction was split in Best Foreign Film in Coproduction and Best Flemish Film in Coproduction. The latter was renamed Best Flemish Film in 2015. An Audience Award was presented to a Belgian film personality in 2011 and 2012, before being replaced by Best First Feature Film in 2013; its winner, however, was first announced during the 66th Cannes Film Festival, three months after the Magritte Awards ceremony. In 2016, it became a merit category, with the audience award being finally retired. The same year, Best Short Film was split in Best Live Action Short Film and Best Animated Short Film. The 8th ceremony was the first to be aired on La Deux, after RTBF took over broadcast rights from BeTV.

From 2022 onward, the ceremony experienced a decline in viewership alongside changes to its broadcast format. That year, it was aired on La Trois and attracted only 26,880 viewers, down from a peak of 169,363 in 2019. The following year, the event continued to be broadcast on La Trois, while also being made available on radio via La Première and online through Auvio. It took place at the Théâtre National Wallonie-Bruxelles and featured a segmented broadcast format, with only the main artistic awards being televised while technical categories were made available exclusively online, reaching a total audience of 43,817 viewers.

In 2025, the ceremony was relocated to Flagey and broadcast exclusively on Auvio, resulting in a further drop to 15,220 viewers. According to La Libre Belgique and La Dernière Heure, the audience had by then shifted toward a predominantly professional audience from within the film industry. The edition drew attention for several political statements, particularly regarding Belgium's responsibility in the crisis in the Democratic Republic of the Congo and the Israeli–Palestinian conflict. Host Charline Vanhoenacker and actor Arieh Worthalter also publicly addressed Reformist Movement party president Georges-Louis Bouchez following his remarks questioning public funding for culture. In the aftermath of these controversies, Charly Herscovici, who holds the intellectual property rights to Magritte's work, criticized what he described as the political instrumentalization of the ceremony and considered withdrawing the painter's name from the awards. This decision drew criticism from industry observers, who argued that such a move placed personal interests above the national and communal purpose of the awards.

In response, in early 2026 the Académie André Delvaux announced that, starting with the fifteenth edition, the award would be renamed René. The name retains a reference to the artist while severing any connection with Herscovici's Magritte Foundation, and forms part of a broader reform aimed at expanding the ceremony to include television series. This change coincided with a leadership transition at the academy, with president Patrick Quinet stepping down and being succeeded by Kassandra Decloux, alongside Jean-Yves Roubin and François Touwaide.

== Rules and voting ==
The Académie André Delvaux, a professional honorary organization, maintains a voting membership of 800 as of 2015. It is divided into different branches, with each representing a different discipline in film production. All members must be invited to join by the Board of Directors. Membership eligibility may be achieved by a competitive nomination or a member may submit a name based on other significant contribution to the field of motion pictures. To be eligible for nomination, a film must be a Belgian production and open in the previous calendar year (from October 16 of the previous calendar year to October 15 of the following year) in Belgium and play for seven consecutive days.

In December, the Académie reveals the list of eligible releases; a DVD set with the catalog of films is also sent to the electors. Voters use an instant run-off voting ballot, with potential nominees rewarded in the single transferable vote tally for having strong supporters who rank them first. The winners are then determined by a second round of voting. All members are allowed to vote in most categories, except for the Honorary Magritte Award, whose recipients are determined by the Board of Directors of the Académie. After the nominations are revealed, in January, special screenings of the nominated films are shown.

== Categories ==
Current awards

- Best Film: since 2011
- Best Director: since 2011
- Best Actor: since 2011
- Best Actress: since 2011
- Best Supporting Actor: since 2011
- Best Supporting Actress: since 2011
- Most Promising Actor: since 2011
- Most Promising Actress: since 2011
- Best Animated Short Film: since 2016
- Best Cinematography: since 2011
- Best Costume Design: since 2011
- Best Documentary Film: since 2011
- Best Documentary Short Film: since 2022
- Best Editing: since 2011
- Best First Feature Film: since 2013
- Best Flemish Film: since 2012
- Best Foreign Film in Coproduction: since 2012
- Best Fiction Short Film: since 2016
- Best Original Score: since 2011
- Best Production Design: since 2011
- Best Screenplay: since 2011
- Best Sound: since 2011
- Honorary Magritte Award: since 2011

Retired awards

- Audience Award: 2011 to 2012
- Best Film in Coproduction: 2011 only
- Best Short Film: 2011 to 2015

== Awards ceremonies ==
The following is a listing of all Magritte Awards ceremonies.

| Ceremony | Date | Venue | President(s) | Host(s) | Best Film winner |
|---|---|---|---|---|---|
| 1st | 5 February 2011 | Square | Jaco Van Dormael | Helena Noguerra | Mr. Nobody |
| 2nd | 4 February 2012 | Square | Bertrand Tavernier | Helena Noguerra | The Giants |
| 3rd | 2 February 2013 | Square | Yolande Moreau | Fabrizio Rongione | Our Children |
| 4th | 1 February 2014 | Square | Émilie Dequenne | Fabrizio Rongione | Ernest & Celestine |
| 5th | 7 February 2015 | Square | François Damiens | Charlie Dupont | Two Days, One Night |
| 6th | 6 February 2016 | Square | Marie Gillain | Charlie Dupont | The Brand New Testament |
| 7th | 4 February 2017 | Square | Virginie Efira | Anne-Pascale Clairembourg | The First, the Last |
| 8th | 3 February 2018 | Square | Natacha Régnier | Fabrizio Rongione | Insyriated |
| 9th | 2 February 2019 | Square | Vincent Patar and Stéphane Aubier | Alex Vizorek | Our Struggles |
| 10th | 1 February 2020 | Square | Pascal Duquenne | Kody | Mothers' Instinct |
| 11th | 12 February 2022 | Square | Thierry Michel | Achille Ridolfi | Madly in Life |
| 12th | 4 March 2023 | Théâtre National | Lubna Azabal | Patrick Ridremont | Nobody Has to Know |
| 13th | 9 March 2024 | Théâtre National | Bouli Lanners | Patrick Ridremont | Love According to Dalva |
| 14th | 22 February 2025 | Flagey | Déborah François | Charline Vanhoenacker | Night Call |
| 15th | 7 March 2026 | Flagey | —N/a | Charline Vanhoenacker | We Believe You |

== See also ==
- Ensor Award (Flemish equivalent)
- César Awards (French equivalent)
- Lumière Awards
- Joseph Plateau Award
