= Benoît Mariage =

Belgian film director (born 1961)

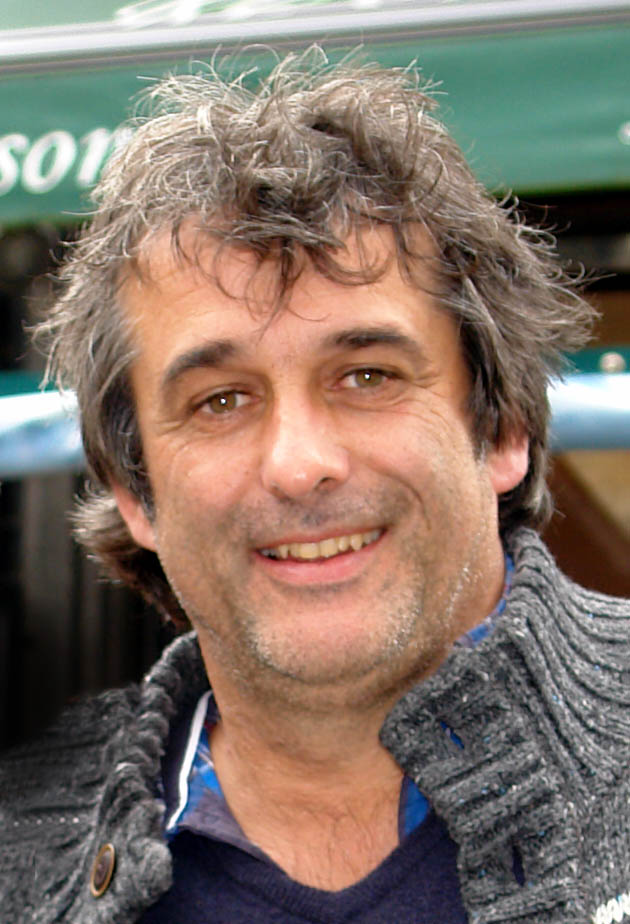
- Mariage in 2012
- Born: 19 July 1961 (age 64); Virton, Belgium
- Occupation: film director

Benoît Mariage (born 19 July 1961) is a Belgian film director.

== Filmography ==
- 2014: Les Rayures du zèbre
- 2007: Cow-boy
- 2003: L'autre
- 1999: Les convoyeurs attendent

Documentaries

- 2001: Nemadis, the Years Without News
- 2011: On the road again, le cinéma de Bouli Lanners

Shorts

- 1990: Elvis
- 1997: The Signalman
