= Joseph Plateau Awards 2004 =

18th Joseph Plateau Awards

May 3, 2005

Best Film:
Steve + Sky

The 18th Joseph Plateau Awards were given on 3 May 2005 and honored the best Belgian filmmaking of 2004. The award ceremony took place at the Mercure Royal Crown Brussels hotel.

== Winners and nominees ==
The nominees were announced on 19 April 2005. The winners are highlighted in bold.

=== Best Belgian Actor ===
- **Benoît Poelvoorde - Aaltra and Podium**
- Titus De Voogdt - Steve + Sky
- Joan Heldenbergh - Steve + Sky

=== Best Belgian Actress ===
- **Marie Vinck - The Kiss (De kus)**
- Viviane de Muynck - Sweet Jam (Confituur)
- Yolande Moreau - When the Sea Rises (Quand la mer monte...)

=== Best Belgian Composer ===
- **Soulwax - Steve + Sky**
- Stef Kamil Carlens and Bert Joris - The Kiss (De kus)
- Vincent D'Hondt - Gilles' Wife (La femme de Gilles)

=== Best Belgian Director ===
- **Frédéric Fonteyne - Gilles' Wife (La femme de Gilles)**
- Lieven Debrauwer - Sweet Jam (Confituur)
- Felix Van Groeningen - Steve + Sky

=== Best Belgian Film ===
- **Steve + Sky**
- Aaltra
- Gilles' Wife (La femme de Gilles)

=== Best Belgian Screenplay ===
- **Gilles' Wife (La femme de Gilles) - Philippe Blasband, Frédéric Fonteyne and Marion Hänsel**
- When the Sea Rises (Quand la mer monte...) - Yolande Moreau
- Steve + Sky - Felix Van Groeningen

=== Best Belgian Short Film ===
- **Alice and I (Alice et moi)**
- Cologne
- Flatlife
