= 4th Magritte Awards =

2014 Belgian film awards ceremony

- Official poster
- Date: 1 February 2014
- Site: Square; Mont des Arts, Brussels, Belgium
- Hosted by: Fabrizio Rongione
- Produced by: José Bouquiaux
- Directed by: Vincent J. Gustin

Highlights
- Best Film: Ernest & Celestine
- Most awards: Ernest & Celestine (3)
- Most nominations: Tango libre (10)

Television coverage
- Network: BeTV

The 4th Magritte Awards ceremony, presented by the Académie André Delvaux, honored the best films of 2013 in Belgium and took place on 1 February 2014, at the Square in the historic site of Mont des Arts, Brussels beginning at 8:00 p.m. CET. During the ceremony, the Académie André Delvaux presented Magritte Awards in 21 categories. The ceremony was televised in Belgium by BeTV. Actress Émilie Dequenne presided the ceremony, while actor Fabrizio Rongione hosted the show for the second time.

The nominees for the 4th Magritte Awards were announced on 9 January 2014. Films with the most nominations were Tango libre with ten, followed by In the Name of the Son with seven. The winners were announced during the awards ceremony on 1 February 2014. Ernest & Celestine won three awards, including Best Film and Best Director for Stéphane Aubier and Vincent Patar. Other multiple winners were Blue Is the Warmest Colour and Tango libre with two awards each.

== Winners and nominees ==
=== Best Film ===
- Ernest & Celestine (Ernest et Célestine)
  - In the Name of the Son (Au nom du fils)
  - Kinshasa Kids
  - Tango libre
  - The World Belongs to Us (Le Monde nous appartient)

=== Best Director ===
- Stéphane Aubier and Vincent Patar – Ernest & Celestine (Ernest et Célestine)
  - Frédéric Fonteyne – Tango libre
  - Sam Garbarski – Vijay and I
  - Vincent Lannoo – In the Name of the Son (Au nom du fils)

=== Best Flemish Film in Coproduction ===
- Kid
  - Brasserie Romantiek
  - The Fifth Season (La Cinquième Saison)

=== Best Foreign Film in Coproduction ===
- Blue Is the Warmest Colour (La Vie d'Adèle – Chapitres 1 & 2)
  - Horses of God (Les Chevaux de Dieu)
  - The Nun (La Religieuse)
  - Populaire

=== Best Screenplay ===
- Tango libre – Philippe Blasband and Anne Paulicevich
  - Kid – Fien Troch
  - The Fifth Season (La Cinquième Saison) – Peter Brosens and Jessica Woodworth
  - Vijay and I – Philippe Blasband and Sam Garbarski

=== Best Actor ===
- Benoît Poelvoorde – A Place on Earth (Une place sur la Terre)
  - François Damiens – Tango libre
  - Jan Hammenecker – Tango libre
  - Sam Louwyck – The Fifth Season (La Cinquième Saison)

=== Best Actress ===
- Pauline Étienne – The Nun (La Religieuse)
  - Lubna Azabal – Goodbye Morocco
  - Déborah François – Populaire
  - Astrid Whettnall – In the Name of the Son (Au nom du fils)

=== Best Supporting Actor ===
- Laurent Capelluto – Just a Sigh (Le Temps de l'aventure)
  - Olivier Gourmet – Grand Central
  - Bouli Lanners – 11.6
  - David Murgia – I Am a Standard Supporter (Je suis supporter du Standard)
  - Renaud Rutten – A Song for My Mother (Une chanson pour ma mère)

=== Best Supporting Actress ===
- Catherine Salée – Blue Is the Warmest Colour (La Vie d'Adèle – Chapitres 1 & 2)
  - Dominique Baeyens – In the Name of the Son (Au nom du fils)
  - Christelle Cornil – Landes
  - Nicole Shirer – BXL/USA

=== Most Promising Actor ===
- Achille Ridolfi – In the Name of the Son (Au nom du fils)
  - Mehdi Dehbi – The Bag of Flour (Le Sac de farine)
  - Steve Driesen – Landes
  - Bent Simons – Kid

=== Most Promising Actress ===
- Pauline Burlet – The Past (Le Passé)
  - Rania Mellouli – The Bag of Flour (Le Sac de farine)
  - Anne Paulicevich – Tango libre
  - Mona Walravens – Blue Is the Warmest Colour (La Vie d'Adèle – Chapitres 1 & 2)

=== Best Cinematography ===
- Horses of God (Les Chevaux de Dieu) – Hichame Alaouié
  - Mood Indigo (L'Écume des jours) – Christophe Beaucarne
  - Tango libre – Virginie Saint-Martin

=== Best Sound ===
- Ernest & Celestine (Ernest et Célestine) – Frédéric Demolder, Emmanuel de Boissieu, Luc Thomas, and Franco Piscopo
  - In the Name of the Son (Au nom du fils) – Philippe Charbonnel, Guilhem Donzel, and Matthieu Michaux
  - Tango libre – Marc Bastien and Thomas Gauder

=== Best Production Design ===
- Tango libre – Véronique Sacrez
  - Mood Indigo (L'Écume des jours) – Pierre Renson
  - The Fifth Season (La Cinquième Saison) – Igor Gabriel

=== Best Costume Design ===
- Vijay and I – Catherine Marchand
  - A Place on Earth (Une place sur la Terre) – Elise Ancion
  - A Song for My Mother (Une chanson pour ma mère) – Nathalie Deceuninck and Aliette Vliers

=== Best Original Score ===
- The World Belongs to Us (Le Monde nous appartient) – Ozark Henry
  - The Bag of Flour (Le Sac de farine) – Christophe Vervoort
  - In the Name of the Son (Au nom du fils) – Michelino Bisceglia

=== Best Editing ===
- Kinshasa Kids – Marie-Hélène Dozo
  - Tango libre – Ewin Ryckaert
  - Vijay and I – Sandrine Deegen

=== Best Short Film ===
- Welkom
  - Bowling Killers
  - Le Conseiller
  - Partouze

=== Best Documentary Film ===
- La Nuit qu'on suppose
  - Amsterdam Stories USA
  - L'irrésisitible ascension de Moïse Katumbi
  - The Sound of Belgium

=== Best First Feature ===
- A Song for My Mother (Une chanson pour ma mère)

=== Honorary Magritte Award ===
- Emir Kusturica

== Films with multiple nominations and awards ==
The following seventeen films received multiple nominations.

- Ten: Tango libre
- Seven: In the Name of the Son
- Four: The Fifth Season, Vijay and I
- Three: The Bag of Flour, Blue Is the Warmest Colour, Ernest & Celestine, Kid, A Song for My Mother
- Two: Horses of God, Kinshasa Kids, Landes, Mood Indigo, The Nun, A Place on Earth, Populaire, The World Belongs to Us

The following three films received multiple awards.

- Three: Ernest & Celestine
- Two: Blue Is the Warmest Colour and Tango libre

== See also ==
- 39th César Awards
- 19th Lumières Awards
- 2013 in film
