= Sweet Jam (2004 film) =

Sweet Jam or Confituur is a Flemish film, directed by Lieven Debrauwer and released on 20 October 2004.

== Cast ==
The film stars Marilou Mermans as Emma, Rik Van Uffelen as Tuur, Viviane de Muynck as Gerda, Chris Lomme as Josée and Jasperina de Jong as Odette.

== Awards ==
At the Joseph Plateau Awards in 2004, Sweet Jam received two nominations: Best Belgian Actress for de Muynck and Best Belgian Director for Debrauwer. Neither de Muynck nor Debrauwer won, being beaten by Marie Vinck (for her performance in De Kus) and Frédéric Fonteyne (for Gilles' Wife) respectively.
