= Michel Bisceglia =

Belgian pianist

Background information
- Born: 4 January 1970 (age 56); Genk, Belgium
- Occupations: Musician, composer, arranger, producer
- Instrument: Piano
- Years active: 1989–present
- Label: Prova Records
- Website: michelinobisceglia.org

Michel Bisceglia (born Michelino Bisceglia; 4 January 1970) is a Belgian musician. He descends from a family of Italian origin. Although he began playing the keyboard at the age of 6, his formal training on classical piano only started when he was already 12 years old. A few years later he switched to modern piano, and by his second year in high school he knew he wanted to dedicate his life to music.

== Jazz musician ==
As a jazz musician he worked with jazz icons such as Randy Brecker, Bob Mintzer, Toots Thielemans and Dewey Redman. Bisceglia also got nominated twice as Best Belgian Musician of the year, 1999 and 2002.

In 1997 Bisceglia formed his own jazz trio, and to this date they still perform in their original lineup. During this period they have recorded six studio albums and played on famous jazz festivals all over the world. Their debut album 'about stories' features guest musicians Randy Brecker and Bob Mintzer. Bisceglia is well known for working with artists from outside the jazz world. His most notable coproduction in this regard was Jazz Works, released with Buscemi (DJ) on Blue Note Records.

== Composer, arranger, orchestrator ==
As a composer, arranger and orchestrator. Bisceglia has worked with the Brussels Philharmonic and the Orquestra Nacional do Porto. In 2004 he started his own symphonic orchestra: Prova Symfonica. In 2010 at the start of Belgium's 12th Presidency of the European Council, he conducted a symphonic orchestra at the 'I Love EU'-concert in Brussels. In 2018, Michel arranged and played the film music of Tim Burton during the exhibition: "The World Of Tim Burton" in C-Mine Genk.

== Film composer ==
Bisceglia is also a film composer. In 2013 he composed the soundtrack for the feature film Marina by director Stijn Coninx. This film is based upon the life of the Italian singer Rocco Granata, who moved to Belgium when he was a young boy. Moreover, he composed the music for Blue Bird, a feature film directed by Gust Van den Berghe that was screened in the Directors' Fortnight section at the 2011 Cannes Film Festival. He has also composed music for Vincent Lannoo's In the Name Of The Son and Little Glory, a film with Hollywood-actor Cameron Bright.

On 25 October 2014 Michel Bisceglia's soundtrack for the film Marina won the Public Choice Award at the World Soundtrack Awards.

== Discography ==
=== As leader/co-leader ===
Year recorded	Title	Label	Personnel/Notes
1997	About Stories	BMG/RCA Victor	With Bob Mintzer (tenor sax), Randy Brecker (trumpet), Werner Lauscher (bass), Marc Lehan (drums)
1999	Le Temps Perdu	PAO	As Cattleya; trio, with Volker Heinze (bass), Harald Ingenhag (drums)
2002	Madeleine	Rent a Dog	As Cattleya; most tracks trio, with Volker Heinze (bass), Harald Ingenhag (drums); some tracks have guests
2003	Second Breath	Prova	Trio, with Werner Lauscher (bass), Marc Lehan (drums)
2005	The Night and the Music	Culture	With Werner Lauscher (bass), Lieven Venken (drums)
2005	Diary	Prova	As Cattleya; trio, with Volker Heinze (bass), Harald Ingenhag (drums)
2006–07	Inner You	Prova	Trio, with Werner Lauscher (bass), Marc Lehan (drums)
2008	Jazz Works	Blue Note	With Buscemi [Dirk Swartenbroekx] and others
2009	Invisible Light	Prova	Trio, with Werner Lauscher (bass), Marc Lehan (drums)
2009	Vertov, L'uomo Con La Macchina Da Presa	Prova	With Buscemi [Dirk Swartenbroekx] and others
2013	11	Prova	Duo, with Carlo Nardozza (trumpet)
2014	Singularity	Prova	With Werner Lauscher (bass), Marc Lehan (drums)
2015	Blue Bird	Prova	With Werner Lauscher (bass), Marc Lehan (drums)
2017	Nosferatu	Prova	With Buscemi & The Michel Bisceglia Ensemble
2018	Orchestral Works 1	Prova	With Piet Van Bockstal, Brussels Chamber Orchestra and AMK Choir
2019	Whispered Wishes	Prova	With Didier François

=== Compilation ===
- 20 Years Recordings (Prova)

== Film Soundtracks ==
As composer

- Blue Bird – Feature film directed by Gust Van den Berghe (2010)
- Mixed Kebab - Feature film directed by Guy Lee Thys (2011)
- Little Glory - Feature film directed by Vincent Lannoo (2011)
- In the Name of the Son (Au Nom du Fils) - Feature film directed by Vincent Lannoo (2012)
- Valentino - Feature film directed by Remy Van Heugten (2013)
- Marina – Feature film directed by Stijn Coninx (2013)
- The Pickle Recipe – Feature film directed by Michael Manasseri (2016)
- Blue Silence - Feature film directed by Mavi Sessizlik (2017)
- Hannah - Feature film directed by Andrea Pallaoro starring Charlotte Rampling (2017)
- Light Thereafter - Feature film directed by Konstantin Bojanov (2017)
- Thieves Of The Wood - Netflix serie directed by Robin Pront & Maarten Moerkerke (2018)
- De Achtste Dag - Feature documentary directed by Yan Thing Yuen & Robert Kosters (2018)
- Still Wishes - Feature documentary directed by Heddy Honigmann (2020)
- Charlotte - Feature animation film directed by Éric Warin & Tahir Rana (2021)

As arranger / orchestrator:

- Ushi Must Marry – Feature film directed by Paul Ruven (2013)
- Symfollies – Animated series directed by Ives Agemans - 32 episodes (1999 - 2004)
- Midden in de Winternacht – Feature film directed by Lourens Blok (2013)
- Boy 7 – Feature film directed by Lourens Blok (2015)
- Terug Naar Morgen – Feature film directed by Lukas Bossuyt (2015)
- Gluckauf – Feature film directed by Remy van Heugten (2015)
- Cafard – Feature film directed by Jan Bultheel (2015)
- Le Fidèle - Feature film directed by Michaël R. Roskam (2017)
- Heinz - Feature animation film directed by Piet Kroon (2018)
- Duelles - Feature film directed by Olivier Masset-Depasse (2018)
- Edmond - Feature film directed by Alexis Michalik (2018)
- Simon's Got a Gift - Feature film directed by Léo Karmann (2019)
- The Spy - Feature film directed by Jens Jonsson (2019)
- Life As It Should Be - Feature film directed by Ruud Schuurman (2020)

Short film

- Hampi - Short film directed by Pim Algoed (2016)
- Sisters - Short film directed by Aza Declercq (2017)
- Palookaville - Short film directed by Pim Algoed (2017)
