= Buscemi (DJ) =

Belgian DJ

- Also known as: (DJ) Buscemi
- Born: Dirk Swartenbroekx
- Origin: Belgium
- Genres: Lounge, house, jazz, Afrobeat, drum and bass, acid jazz, nu jazz
- Occupations: DJ, Musician
- Website: www.buscemi.be

Buscemi is the nickname of the Belgian DJ Dirk Swartenbroekx, who is also active as a newspaper journalist.

== Musical Style and Career ==
His style can be described as dance music with a touch of Latino, with among others lounge, house, jazz, Brazilian grooves, afrobeat and drum and bass.

The CD Camino Real contains house music with funk and Latin influences. Artists like Isabelle Antena, Ted Milton and Michael Franti cooperated in the production of this CD. On the CD Late Nite Reworks Vol. 1 different mixes can be heard.

Buscemi not only brings out his music on hard disk but also performs live sets, supported by his band with drummer Luuk Cox, bass Hans Mullens and trumpetteer Sam Versweyveld. As such, they appeared multiple times at Rock Werchter, I Love Techno, Ten Days Off, Pukkelpop, Gentse Feesten, Dour Festival, Zeverrock and many other festivals.

Buscemi also produced the soundtrack of the Belgian drama series De Rodenburgs, a TV series about the intrigues between two rich families in Kortrijk.

In the summer of 2011, he scored a hit ("O Sarracino") together with Rocco Granata.

Since 2023, Buscemi has been cooperating with Moodby Play, a European provider of background music streaming services for public venues like hotels, bars, restaurants, stores, and gyms. To date, he created six music stations on Moodby: "Loungy and world grooves by Buscemi", "Jazz time by Buscemi", "Cocktail music", "Classical", and others.

Keeping pace with the trends, the DJ introduced a collection of 3,000 Buscemi Beats NFTs that feature his unique audio samples in five cultural themes, including Miami Latin, Afro Vibes, and Bossa Nova.

== Discography ==
=== Albums ===
Album	Year	Peak positions	
Album	Year	BEL (Fl)	BEL (Wa)
Our Girl in Havana	2001	8	–
A Warm Blue Note Session - Blue Note's Sidetracks Vol. 2	2002	30	–
Camino Real	2003	3	49
Caliente! - Blue Note's Sidetracks Vol. 4	2004	24	–
Late Nite Reworks Vol. 1 - A collection of remixes by Buscemi	2005	10	–
Retro nuevo	2006	8	–
Welcome to the Party Vol. 1 (Squadra Bossa feat. Buscemi)	2008	21	–
Jazz Works (Buscemi & The Michel Bisceglia Ensemble)	2008	21	–
Vertov, l'uomo con la macchina da presa (Buscemi & The Michel Bisceglia Ensemble)	2009	55	–
In situ	2009	18	–
Rocco con Buscemi (Rocco Granata with Buscemi)	2011	25	–
Nite People	2012	7	–
Club sodade - Triple best of	2013	16	83
Sol y suave	2014	13	138
Luna misteriosa	2018	191	–

=== Singles ===
Album	Year	Peak positions	
Album	Year	BEL (Fl)	BEL (Wa)
"The Salon Section" INCredible Sound of Gilles Peterson	1999		
"Seaside" (feat. Isabelle Antena)	2003	11	18
"Bollywood Swing King"	2006	39	–
"Sahib Balkan"	2007	49	–
"Dipso Calypso" (feat. Lady Cath)	2009	31	–
"'O Sarracino" (Rocco Granata with Buscemi)	2011	38	–
"Rocco cha cha" (Rocco Granata with Buscemi)	2011	89	–
"Nite People" (feat. Assunta Mandaglio)	2012	52	–
"La chatte" (feat. Daan)	2013	11	–
"Gagarin" (feat. Eline)	2014	26	–
