= The Blue Bird (play) =

1908 play by Maurice Maeterlinck

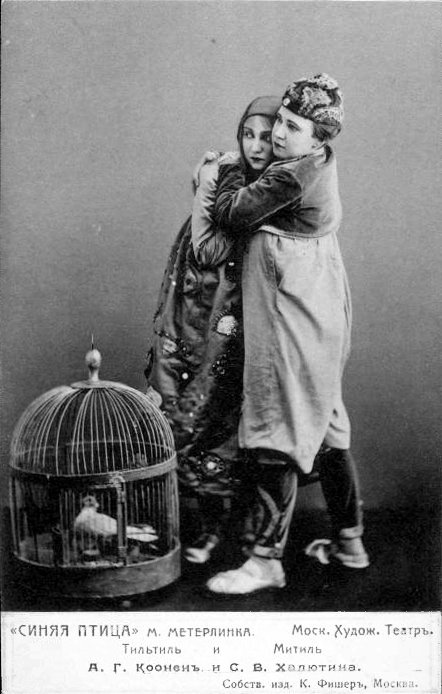
- Mytyl (Alisa Koonen) and Tyltyl (Sofya Khalyutina) in the Moscow Art Theatre production (1908)
- Written by: Maurice Maeterlinck

Premiere
- Date: 30 September 1908

The Blue Bird (French: L'Oiseau bleu) is a 1908 play by Belgian playwright and poet Maurice Maeterlinck. It premiered on 30 September 1908 at Konstantin Stanislavski's Moscow Art Theatre, and was presented on Broadway in 1910. It was translated into English by Alexander Teixeira de Mattos. In 1911, Maeterlinck was awarded the Nobel Prize for Literature.

The French composer Albert Wolff wrote an opera (first performed at the New York Metropolitan Opera in 1919) based on Maeterlinck's original play, and Maeterlinck's inamorata Georgette Leblanc produced a novelization.

The story is about a girl called Mytyl and her brother Tyltyl seeking happiness, represented by The Blue Bird of Happiness, aided by the good fairy Bérylune.

Maeterlinck also wrote a relatively little known sequel to The Blue Bird titled The Betrothal; or, The Blue Bird Chooses.

The play has been adapted for several films and a TV series.

== Story ==
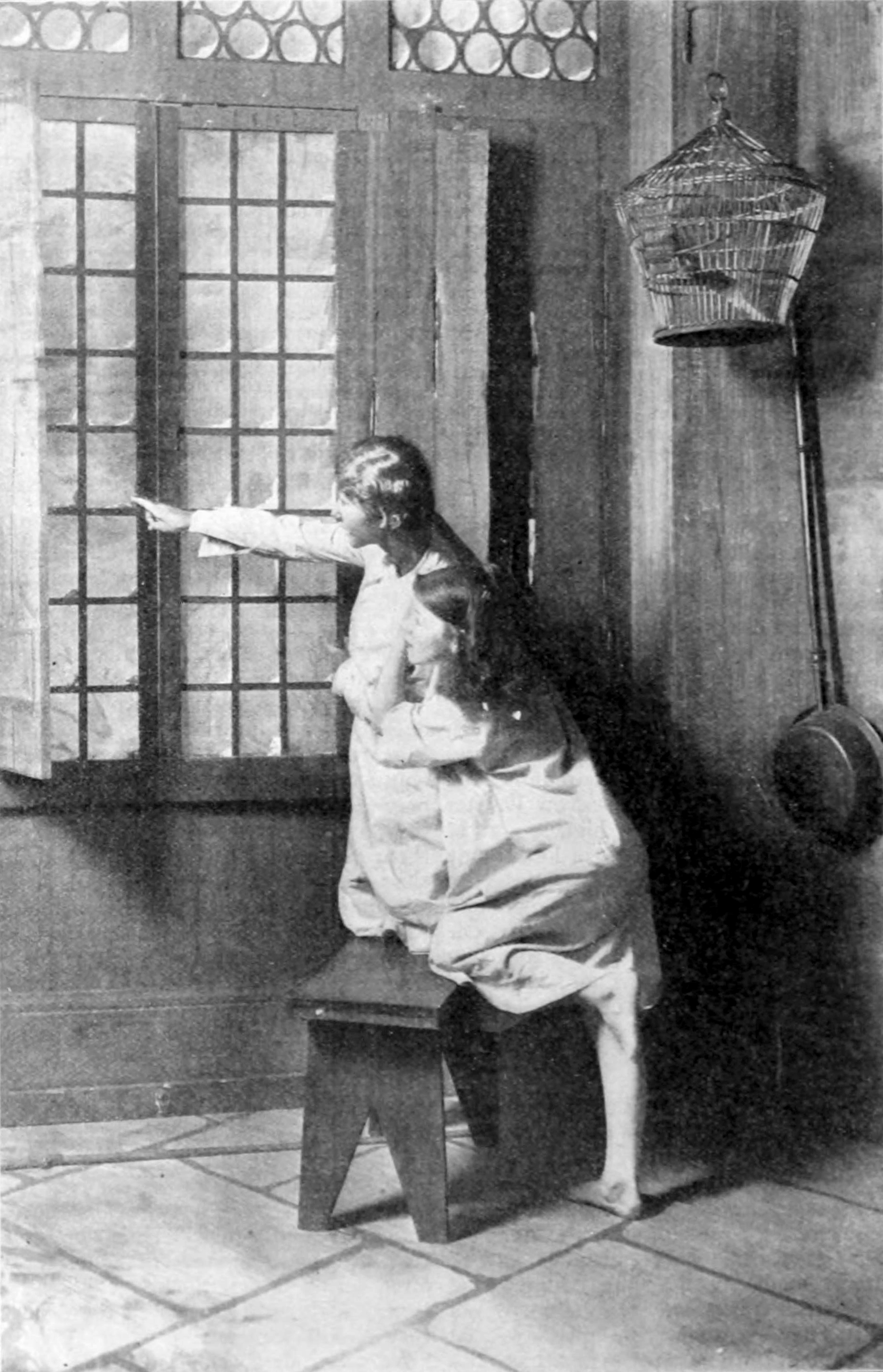
Tyltyl (Gladys Hulette) and Mytyl (Irene Brown) watch the Christmas party across the street in the Broadway production of The Blue Bird (1910)

In the opening scene, the two children gleefully describe the beautiful decorations and rich desserts that they see in the house of a wealthy family nearby. When Bérylune says that it is wrong for the rich not to share their cakes with Tyltyl and Mytyl, the boy corrects her. It is enough that he gets to watch others' happiness; their joy does not create envy in him. The theme is emphasized again when the children meet the Luxuries, particularly the biggest one of all, the Luxury of Being Rich. When Tyltyl turns the diamond, the hall is bathed with a dazzling brightness, and the Luxuries run wildly in search of a dark corner where they may hide their ugliness from the ethereal light.

At the end of the play, Tyltyl shows what he has learned about happiness. He looks out the window at the forest and remarks how beautiful it is. The inside of the house looks much lovelier to him than it did before. Also, he creates great happiness for another by giving his pet bird, which seems much bluer than before, to the sick child.

== Adaptations ==
=== Novelization ===
The Blue Bird for Children by Georgette Leblanc and Maurice Maeterlinck

=== Film ===
- The Blue Bird (1910 film), a silent film starring Pauline Gilmer and Olive Walter
- The Blue Bird (1918 film), a silent film directed by Maurice Tourneur
- The Blue Bird (1940 film), starring Shirley Temple, directed by Walter Lang
- The Blue Bird (1970 film), a Soviet animated film
- The Blue Bird (1976 film), a joint Soviet-American production directed by George Cukor
- Blue Bird, filmed in Togo. Directed by Gust Van Den Berghe and presented at the 2011 Cannes festival.

=== Fine art ===
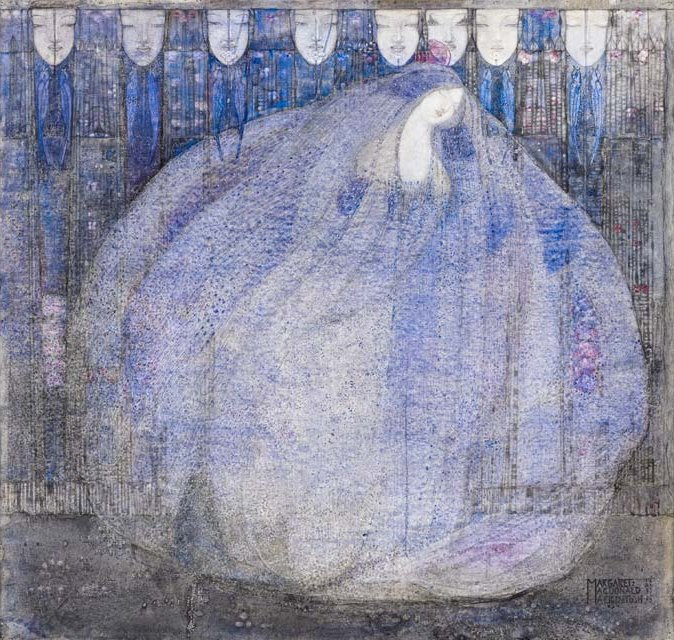
The Mysterious Garden, 1911, by Margaret Macdonald Mackintosh

- L'Oiseau bleu (The Blue Bird) is a 1912–13 Cubist painting by Jean Metzinger.
- The Mysterious Garden, 1911, by Margaret Macdonald Mackintosh.

=== Television ===
- Maeterlinck's Blue Bird: Tyltyl and Mytyl's Adventurous Journey, a 1980 Japanese animated TV series

=== Radio ===
- The Blue Bird was dramatized as a half-hour radio play on the December 24, 1939, broadcast of The Screen Guild Theater, starring Shirley Temple and Nelson Eddy.

=== Opera ===
- L'oiseau bleu, 1919 opera by Albert Wolff, libretto by Maurice Maeterlinck based on his play.

=== Video game ===
Season of the Blue Bird, a seasonal story update taking place between April 21, 2025, to July 6, 2025, by Thatgamecompany, taking place within their 2019 game release Sky: Children of the Light.

== Notable cultural references ==
Maurice Maeterlinck commemorative coin

The Dutch school types Mytyl schools and Tyltyl schools are named after Mytyl and Tyltyl: they are for children with a physical disability and for children with both a physical and mental disability, respectively. The Scouting Nederland section for children with special needs (Extension Scouting) is named: "Blauwe Vogels" (Blue Birds).

Celebrating the 100th anniversary of "Maurice Maeterlinck's greatest contemporary success The Blue Bird", as it was termed, his play was selected as the main motif of a high-value collectors' coin: the Belgian 50 euro Maurice Maeterlinck commemorative coin, minted in 2008.

== See also ==
- Bluebird of happiness
