= Didier François =

Belgian nyckelharpa performer (born 1969)

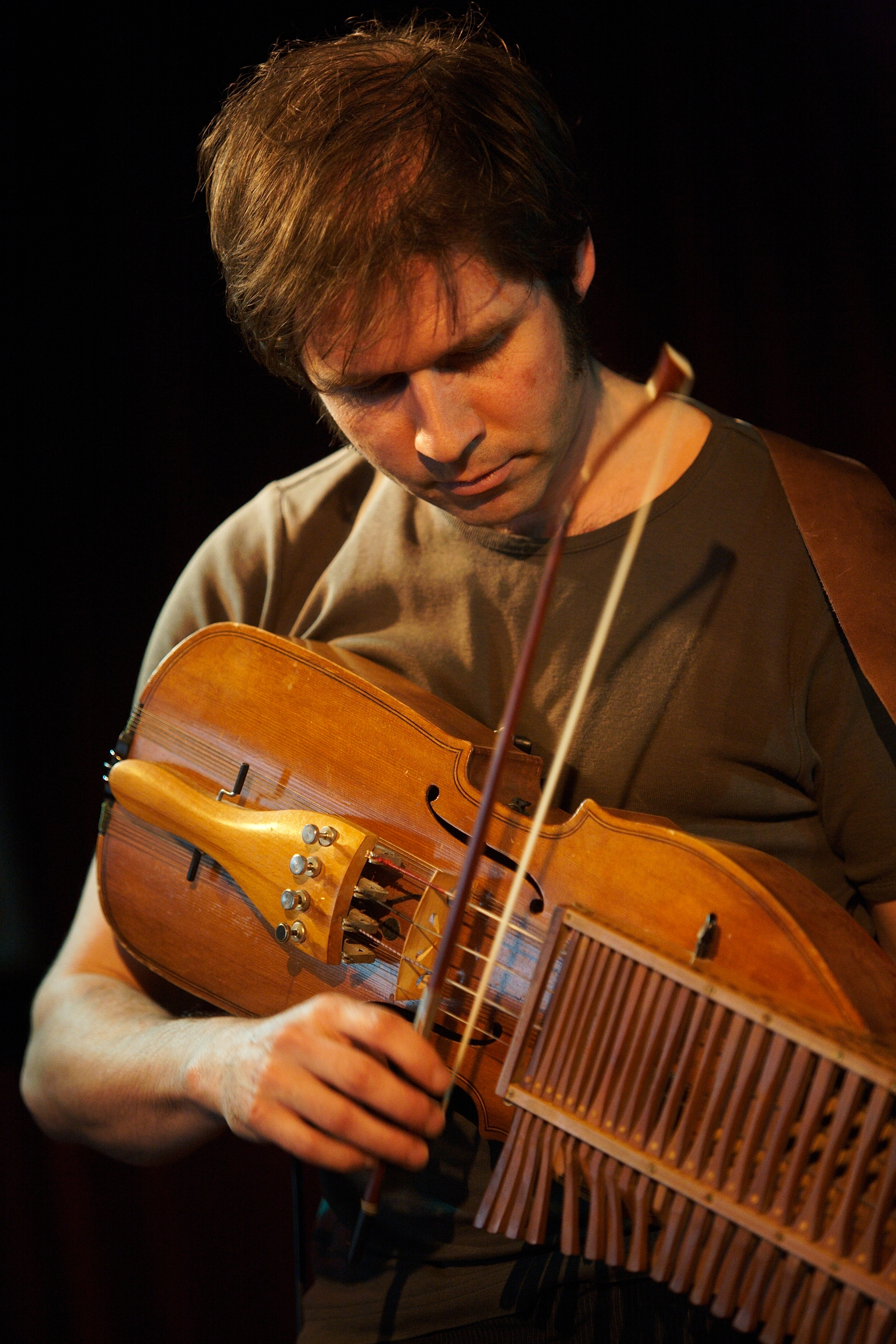
- Didier François playing the Nyckelharpa
- Born: 2 April 1969 (age 57); Brussels
- Education: 1992 – 1999, he studied violin
- Occupations: musician and music teacher specialized in nyckelharpa, composer and sculptor
- Television: VPRO NED 1 "Vrije geluiden", ARTE B. "Cinquante degrés nord", EXQI Culture
- Website: didierfrancois.be

Didier François (born in Brussels on 2 April 1969) is a Belgian musician specialized in nyckelharpa and a sculptor living in Mechelen in Belgium.

== Studies ==
From 1992 to 1999 François studied violin with Myriam Quersin (successor to Arthur Grumiaux at the Brussels Conservatory) and composition with Daan Manneke at the Amsterdam Conservatory. He also participated in several jazz workshops with Philip Catherine, Hein Van De Geyn and Maarten Weiler.

== Teaching ==
Didier François has taught nyckelharpa at the Scuola di Musica Popolare di Forlimpopoli, Italy and Akademie Burg Fürsteneck, (Germany) as a member of the European Nyckelharpa Training. He conducts seminars and workshops on relaxation technique based on the Belgian violin school of Arthur Grumiaux: relaxed and fluid movements for beauty of sound, freedom of expression and avoidance of tendinitis. He is also a member of the Cadence project supported by the European Commission.

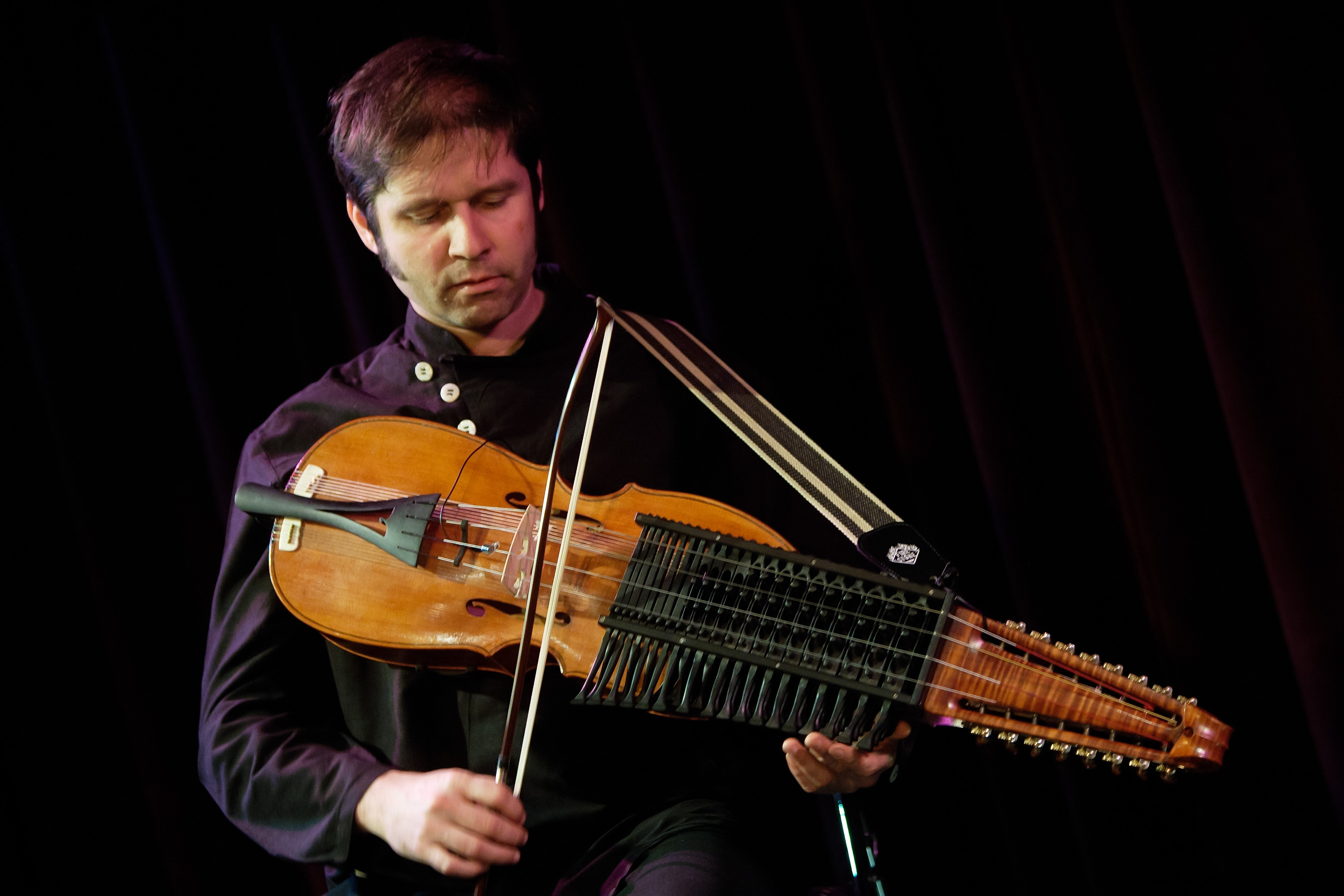
personal posture to avoid back tension

== Performances ==
- Guest of Stéphane Grappelli, Audi Jazz Festival (Belgium).
- Guest of Gabriel Yacoub, Amsterdam, St. Chartier Festival (France).
- Film music recording with Armand Amar for Costa-Gavras (Amen, Le Couperet, Eden à l'Ouest), Yann Arthus Bertrand (la terre vu du ciel, Human, Méditerranée, notre mer à tous) Pierre Aknine (Ce soir je vais tuer l'assassin de mon fils). Jean-Michel Bertrand (la vallée des loups) Diane Kurys (Sagan) Erik Poppe (Tusen ganger god natt)
- Solo live performance of The Lord of the Rings by Howard Shore with Belgian Philharmonic at Antwerp Sport Palace
- Worked for 10 years for the Belgian Ensemble Leporello.
- Member of the Kapsberger ensemble directed by Rolf Lislevand.
- Member of the Belgian Baroque ensemble Zefiro Torna.

== Discography ==
- Whispered Wishes, 2019, with Michel Bisceglia, Prova Records
- Baroque Update, 2015, HomeRecords.be (4446140)
- Nyckelharpa solo, 2011, HomeRecords.be (4446079)
- Sjansons Patinées HomeRecords.be (4446047)
- Double CD: Didier Francois, Gilles Chabenat – Gabriel Yacoub HomeRecords.be (4446033)
- Falling Tree Long Distance Records (3073722 WAG331)
- locuras de vanelo Artrisjok Records
- 44 duetti Béla Bartòk, with Marco Ambrosini, Wild Boar Records (WBM 21022)
- Alicantes Map Records
- Duo Philip Masure Didier Francois Map Records

== Nyckelharpa ==
François is known for his unusual technique and posture when playing the nyckelharpa. Holding the instrument in front of the chest, one is able to move both arms in a more natural and relaxed fashion. Using a violin shoulder rest to keep the nyckelharpa away from the body so it can swing freely also causes it to sound more open.

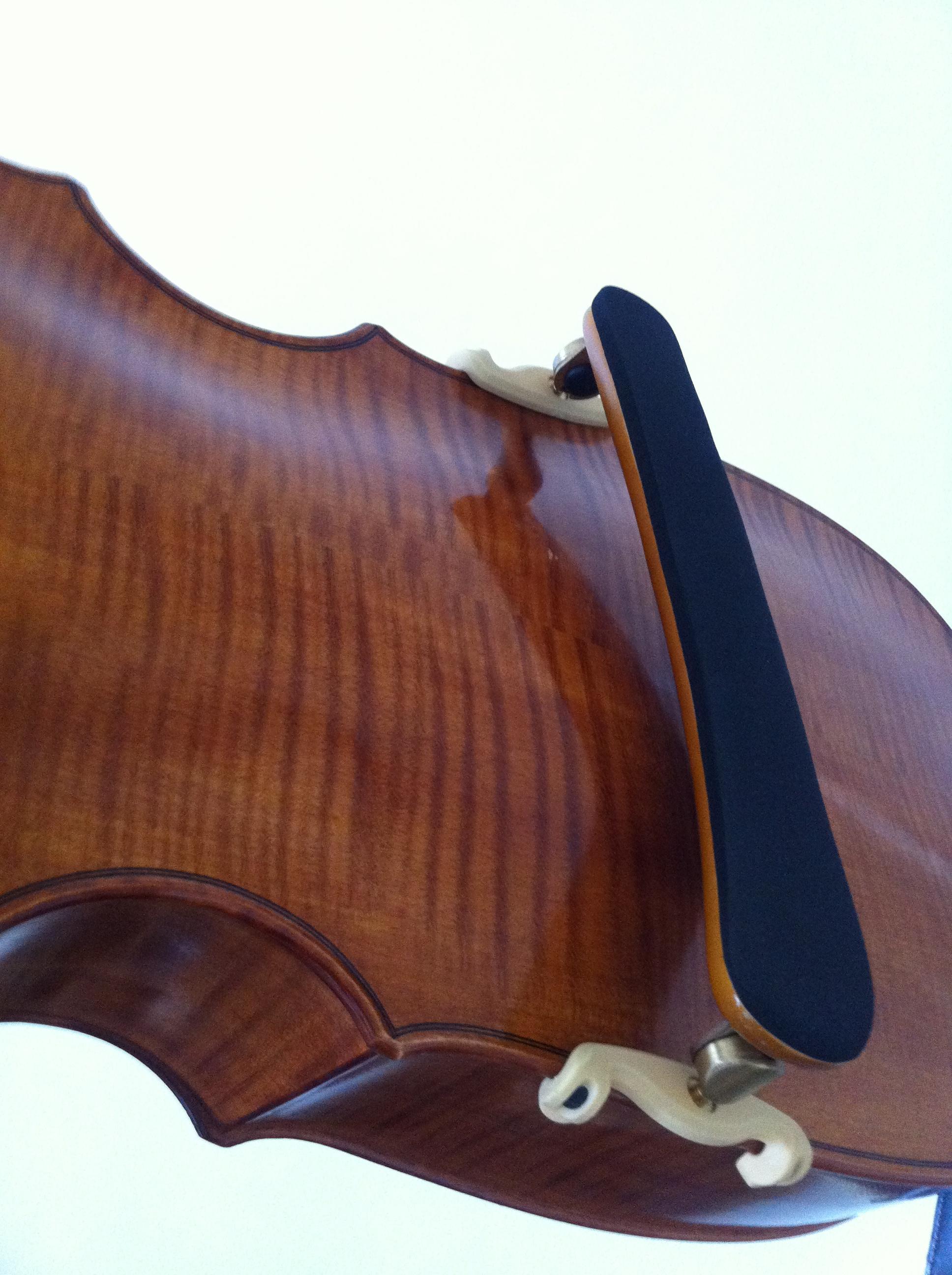
Shoulder rest to keep the back of the instrument free for vibration

For many years François worked with the Nyckelharpa builder Joos Janssens (Dunières) for the further evolution of the instrument. Later with the nyckelharpa and bow builder Jean Claude Condi (Mirecourt), he helped with the creation of a study instrument for children. He himself plays nyckelharpas of both builders.

Today Didier Francois plays on an nyckelharpa with gut strings specially built for renaissance-baroque music. it has an other sound close to the viola da gamba and therefore has the name viola d'amore a chiavi. This instrument is built by Alex Pilz

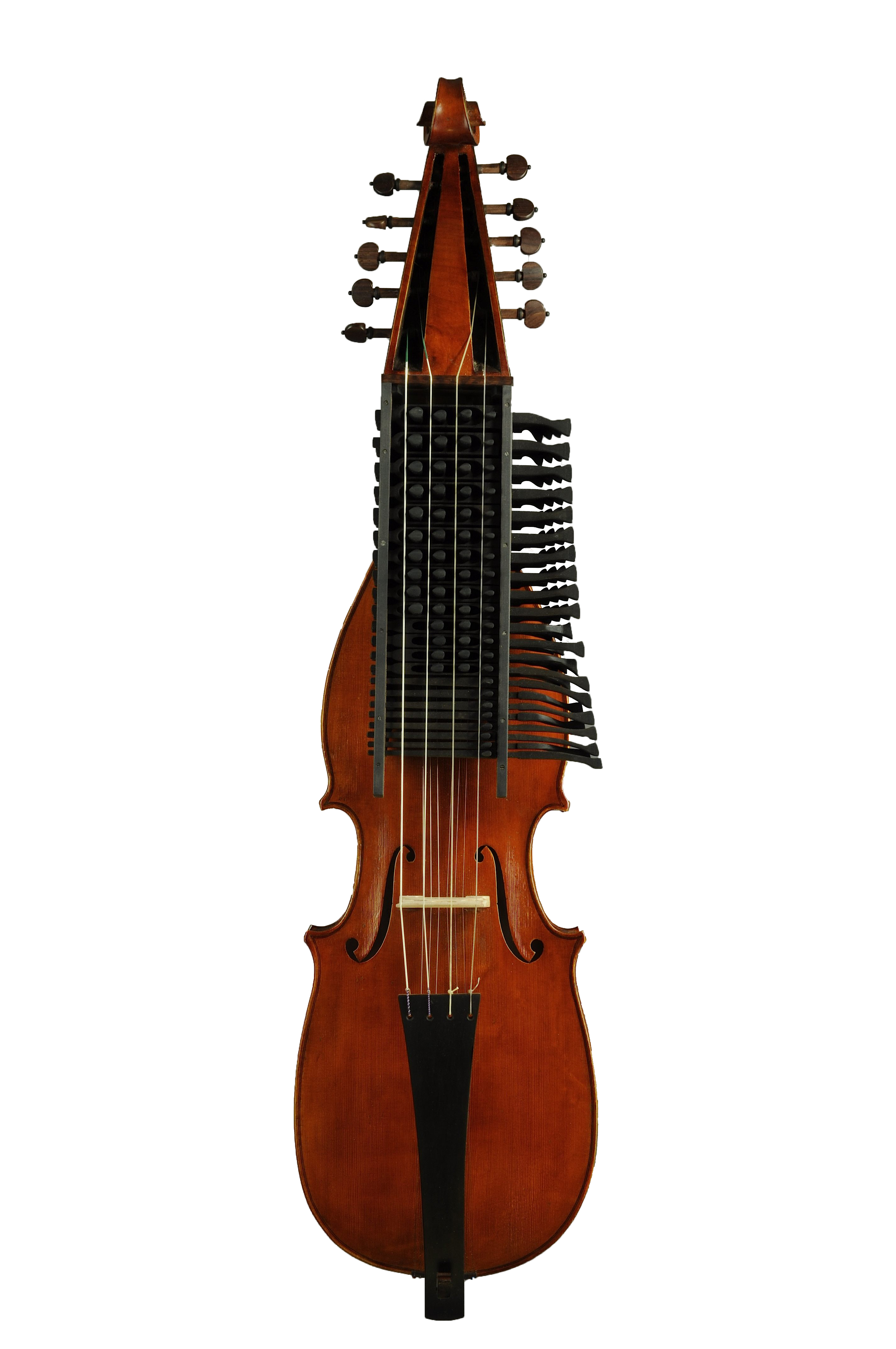
viola d'amore a chiavi built by Alex Pliz
