= Figline =

Figline may refer to the following Italian places or teams:

- Figline Valdarno, a municipality in the province of Florence, Tuscany
- A.S.D. Giallo-Blu Figline: Italian team of football based in Figline Valdarno
- Figline Vegliaturo, a municipality in the province of Cosenza, Calabria
- Figline di Prato, a frazione of Prato, Tuscany
- Figline, the ancient name of Forlì, used in the 11th and 12th century
