= Steve + Sky =

- Theatrical release poster
- Directed by: Felix Van Groeningen
- Written by: Felix Van Groeningen
- Produced by: Dirk Impens
- Starring: Titus De Voogdt; Delfine Bafort; Johan Heldenbergh
- Cinematography: Ruben Impens
- Edited by: Nico Leunen
- Music by: Soulwax
- Production companies: Favourite Films NV; Menuet
- Distributed by: Kinepolis Film Distribution (Belgium); Lifesize Entertainment (United States)
- Release dates: February 18, 2004 (Belgium); July 8, 2005 (United States)
- Running time: 97 minutes
- Country: Belgium
- Language: Dutch

Steve + Sky is a 2004 Belgian comedy-drama film written and directed by Felix Van Groeningen in his directorial debut. It stars Titus De Voogdt, Delfine Bafort and Johan Heldenbergh. The film is set in Kortrijksesteenweg in Ghent, which is known for its many brothels, and follows two 22-year-olds whose lives crosses paths.

== Cast ==
- Titus De Voogdt as Steve
- Delfine Bafort as Sky
- Johan Heldenbergh as Jean-Claude
- Romy Bollion as Charlotte
- Wine Dierickx as Nikita

== Plot ==
Steve is a small-time drug runner, sentenced to time in prison when he is caught after his girlfriend accidentally rear-ends a police van. While in prison he meets Jean-Claude, a wheelchair user, and together they agree to start stealing motorcycles after they are both released. Sky is a drifter, employed in a series of part-time jobs including prostitute and factory worker. There are two encounters between the two, both while at a bowling alley, before they first meet formally, at a brothel that Jean-Claude has opened, as Sky is a friend of Jean-Claude's daughter Charlotte.

The two start a casual relationship, but Sky seems to be genuinely in love whereas Steve if less committed. Steve plans to move to Slovenia with Jean-Claude to start a business, but it is ambiguous as to whether they actually make it. The film ends with Steve almost running over Sky while she is dancing across a pedestrian crossing and he is speeding in a stolen motorbike.

== Release ==
The film was released on February 18, 2004 in Belgium by Kinepolis Film Distribution. It also received a limited release by Lifesize Entertainment on July 8, 2005 in the United States.

== Critical reception ==
Dana Stevens of The New York Times gave the film a negative review, writing: "With its deliberately washed-out color palette, affectless dialogue and nearly event-free story line, "Steve + Sky" is a mere slip of a movie, a wan character study of people who add up to little more than a series of studied quirks" but praised the performances of the two lead actors. Eddie Cockrell of Variety wrote: "Promising frosh helmer Felix van Groeningen exhibits a fresh eye, though his script is full of too many self-consciously Tarantino-ish verbal digressions that serve to distract from the story".

The film won Best Film and Best Composer at the 2004 Joseph Plateau Awards.
