= Kid (2012 film) =

2013 film by Fien Troch

- Directed by: Fien Troch
- Written by: Fien Troch
- Produced by: Antonino Lombardo; Jacques-Henri Bronckart; Olivier Bronckart
- Cinematography: Frank van den Eeden
- Edited by: Nico Leunen
- Music by: Senjan Jansen
- Release dates: 12 August 2012 (Ghent Film Festival); 16 January 2013 (Belgium)
- Running time: 92 minutes
- Countries: Belgium; Netherlands; Germany
- Language: Dutch

Kid is a 2012 drama film. It was written and directed by Fien Troch, produced by Antonino Lombardo, and starred Bent Simons, Gabriela Carrizo and Maarten Meeusen.

The film tells the story of Kid, a seven-year-old boy who lives with his mother and his older brother Billy on a farm outside a small town. Abandoned by their father, they have had to fend for themselves. Their finances are in ruins and the two boys have to move with their uncle and aunt.

Kid had its world premiere on October 12, 2012 at the Flanders International Film Festival Ghent. It has received high praise from film critics and won various awards from numerous film organizations and festivals. Kid received the André Cavens Award for Best Film by the Belgian Film Critics Association (UCC). The film had its North American premiere at the AFI Fest on November 2, 2012. It received three nominations at the 4th Magritte Awards, winning Best Flemish Film in Coproduction.
