= Step by Step (2002 film) =

- Directed by: Philippe Blasband
- Written by: Philippe Blasband
- Produced by: Olivier Rausin; Claude Waringo; Arlette Zylberberg; Jani Thiltges; Patrick & Stéphane Quinet
- Starring: Benoît Verhaert; Philippe Noiret; Yolande Moreau
- Cinematography: Virginie Saint-Martin
- Edited by: Ewin Ryckaert
- Music by: Daan Stuyven
- Production company: Artémis Productions
- Distributed by: Président Films
- Release date: 11 September 2002
- Running time: 86 min.
- Country: Belgium
- Language: French

Step by Step or Un honnête commerçant is a 2002 Belgium comedy thriller film directed by Philippe Blasband.

== Plot ==
The police question Hubert Verkamen, suspected of having killed an entire family. Despite presenting himself as an honest merchant, the cops know perfectly well that he is nothing but a dangerous drug dealer. Having never succeeded in catching him, they rejoice at finally having the opportunity to arrest him and try every means to make him talk, to wear him down. But nothing works; the manipulation is not where it was expected.

== Cast ==
- Benoît Verhaert as Hubert Verkamen
- Philippe Noiret as Louis Chevalier
- Yolande Moreau as Inspector Chantal Bex
- Frédéric Bodson as Inspector Jean Denoote
- Serge Larivière as Inspector Patrice Mercier
- Patrick Hastert as Raoul
- Olindo Bolzan as Jean-François Samson
- Michel Bogen as Jean-Louis
- Michel Kacenelenbogen as Jean-Louis
- Nathalie Laroche as Nadine Verkamen
- Nicolas Combe as Francis
- Rachid Benbouchta as Person
- Belen Montoro as Madame Samson
- Lucas Van den Eynde as The Dutchman

== Production ==
The movie was screened to Montreal World Film Festival (Canada), Venice Film Festival (Italy), Rouen Nordic Film Festival (France), Cognac Film Festival (France) and Zlín Film Festival (Czech Republic).

== Accolades ==
Award	Category	Recipient	Result
Montreal World Film Festival	Grand Prix des Amériques	Philippe Blasband	Nominated
