= 13 Commandments =

2018 Dutch-language television series

- 13 Commandments series banner
- Genre: Crime mystery thriller
- Written by: Rita Bossaer; Dirk Nielandt; Lieven Scheerlinck
- Directed by: Maarten Moerkerke
- Starring: Dirk van Dijck; Marie Vinck; Karlijn Sileghem
- Country of origin: Belgium
- Original language: Dutch
- No. of seasons: 1
- No. of episodes: 13

Production
- Running time: 46 minutes
- Production company: Menuet Producties

Original release
- Network: VTM
- Release: September 10, 2018

13 Commandments (Dutch: 13 Geboden) is a 2017 Dutch-language (Flemish) television series starring Dirk van Dijck, Marie Vinck and Karlijn Sileghem. The plot revolves around Peter Devriendt (Dirk van Dijck), a divorced father and veteran cop working for Belgium's Federal Criminal Police, and his new partner Vicky Degraeve (Marie Vinck). A serial killer begins a crime spree with the mission to punish individuals who have committed acts that counter the Ten Commandments.

== Plot ==
The body of a 16-year old Turkish teenage girl is found in the town of Aalst, her throat cut. The police assume it to be an honour killing committed by her uncle but are stymied by the family's refusal to testify. Within a day, the suspect himself is found under a bridge, badly burned but alive. On the bridge above him, someone has sprayed the words "Thou shalt have no other gods", referencing the first commandment.

This is the first in a series of crimes, committed by someone going by the name of Moses, each of which is in some way inspired by one of the Ten Commandments. Those who have been perceived to have violated the Commandments are hunted down and punished without mercy. Two police detectives, Vicky Degraeve (Marie Vinck) and Peter Devriendt (Dirk Van Dijck) are assigned to find the vigilante but are increasingly hindered by the public opinion, which supports Moses despite his excesses.

== Cast ==
- Dirk van Dijck as Peter Devriendt
- Marie Vinck as Vicky Degraeve
- Karlijn Sileghem as Liesbet Dujardin
- Line Pillet as Sara Devriendt
- Hans De Munterv as Georges Degraeve
- Lola Rose Delany as Blue
- Ella Leyers as Paulien Rooze
- Katelijne Verbeke as Chantal Theunissen
- Kim Hertogs as Kelly
- Karen van Parijs as Vicky's Mother
- Leo Achten as Peter's Father
- Gökhan Girginol as Hristo Bodurov
- Jeroen Perceval as Felix Monnet
- Bert Haelvoet as Simon Roelandts
- Koen van Impe as Tony Vermeire
- Ludo Hoogmartens as Jos Schatteman
- Joke Sluydts as Journaliste
- Tom Ternest as Marnix Santermans
- Hilde De Baerdemaeker as Sofie Vandekerckhoven
- Roy Aernouts as Mike De Meyer
- Maarten Mertens as Journalist
- Matthieu Sys as Lukas Heyde

== Release ==
13 Commandments was released on September 10, 2018, on VTM.
