= Marina (song) =

1959 song by Rocco Granata

- 7" vinyl single cover

Song by Rocco Granata

from the album Marina & Other Italian Favorites
- Released: June 1959
- Genre: Chanson
- Length: 3:06
- Label: Barclay, Columbia
- Songwriters: Rocco Granata, Jean Broussolle

"Marina" is a 1959 Italian song by Italian-Belgian singer-songwriter Rocco Granata, his first international hit and best known song. Originally released in 1959 as the B-side of "Manuela", the B-side became more played than the A-side, and by 30 January "Marina" interrupted "Oh! Carol" by Neil Sedaka for one week at the No.1 spot of Hitkrant's List of European number-one hits of 1960. The song sold millions of copies. It was #1 in Belgium, #31 in the US, and #1 in Germany, The Netherlands, Italy and Norway. It was the #2 jukebox play of the whole year in Automaten-Markt's records after "Seemann" by Lolita.

== Trivia ==
The song "Marina" was so popular in Belgium and the Netherlands that many parents named their baby daughters Marina. In the Netherlands, the number of born Marina's rose from 156 in 1958 (before the hit song), to 190 and 250 in 1959 and 1960: an increase of 22% in 1959 and again 32% the next year. In Italy, the number of born Marina's goes from 2984 in 1959 to 8294 in 1960, becoming the fifth most popular name in the country in that year.

A (German) musical feature film entitled Marina (by Paul Martin) was released in 1960.

In 1989, Granata commissioned a dance remix of "Marina" (by Rocco Granata & The Carnations), which again topped the Belgian charts as well as those of Italy and Germany.

In 2013 his early life (and his musical career starting with the sudden success of the hit "Marina") was captured in a new biographical movie named Marina, directed by Stijn Coninx.

== Charts ==
=== Weekly charts ===
Weekly chart performance for "Marina”
Chart (1959–60)	Peak position
Belgium (Ultratop 50 Flanders)	1
Belgium (Ultratop 50 Wallonia)	1
Italy (Musica e dischi)	1
Netherlands (Dutch Top 100)	1
Norway (VG-lista)	1
US Billboard Hot 100	31
West Germany (Media Control)	1

1989 Remix version

Chart (1989)	Peak position
Italy Airplay (Music & Media)	3
