= Tango libre =

2012 film

- Film poster
- Directed by: Frédéric Fonteyne
- Written by: Philippe Blasband; Anne Paulicevich
- Starring: François Damiens
- Cinematography: Virginie Saint-Martin
- Edited by: Ewin Ryckaert
- Release dates: 29 August 2012 (Venice); 28 September 2012 (Belgium); 28 November 2012 (France)
- Running time: 98 minutes
- Countries: Belgium; Luxembourg; France
- Languages: French; Spanish
- Box office: $612,000

Tango libre is a 2012 comedy film directed by Frédéric Fonteyne. In January 2014 the film received ten nominations at the 4th Magritte Awards.

The film centers on complicated personal relations between some prisoners in a French prison, their family members, and prison guards. A constant theme underlying the action is Argentine tango, which is learnt by many characters, both inside and outside the prison.

== Cast ==
- François Damiens as Jean-Christophe
- Sergi López i Ayats as Fernand
- Jan Hammenecker as Dominic
- Anne Paulicevich as Alice
- Zacharie Chasseriaud as Antonio
- Christian Kmiotek as Michel
- David Murgia as Luc, the young guard
- Frédéric Frenay as Patrick, the tattooed man
- Dominique Lejeune as Popeye
- Marc Charlet as Marco
- Mariano Frúmboli as the Argentinian
