= The Fifth Season (film) =

2012 film

- Film poster
- Directed by: Peter Brosens; Jessica Woodworth
- Starring: Sam Louwyck
- Release dates: 5 September 2012 (Venice); 23 January 2013 (Belgium)
- Running time: 93 minutes
- Countries: Belgium; Netherlands; France
- Language: French

The Fifth Season (French: La Cinquième Saison) is a 2012 Belgian drama film directed by Peter Brosens and Jessica Woodworth. The film was selected to compete for the Golden Lion at the 69th Venice International Film Festival. The film received four nominations at the 4th Magritte Awards.

== Cast ==
- Sam Louwyck as Pol
- Aurélia Poirier
- Django Schrevens
- Gill Vancompernolle
