= Une liaison pornographique =

- Directed by: Frédéric Fonteyne
- Written by: Philippe Blasband
- Starring: Nathalie Baye; Sergi López
- Cinematography: Virginie Saint-Martin
- Edited by: Chantal Hymans
- Music by: André Dziezuk; Marc Mergen; Jeannot Sanavia
- Release date: 4 September 1999 (France)
- Running time: 80 min.
- Countries: Belgium; France; Switzerland; Luxembourg
- Language: French

Une liaison pornographique (English: A Pornographic Affair; US title: An Affair of Love) is a 1999 romantic drama film by Frédéric Fonteyne, and written by Philippe Blasband.

== Plot ==
A man and a woman meet to fulfill a sexual fantasy. But slowly feelings emerge and create a relationship. Sex, it seems, is not the only thing that unites them.

== Cast ==
- Nathalie Baye – Her
- Sergi López – Him
- Jacques Viala – Interviewer (voice)
- Paul Pavel – Joseph Lignaux
- Sylvie Van den Elsen – Madame Lignaux
- Pierre Gerranio – Hotel receptionist
- Hervé Sogne – Ambulance driver
- Christophe Sermet – Hospital employee

== Reception ==
On review aggregator website Rotten Tomatoes, the film holds an approval rating of 86% based on 36 reviews, with an average rating of 7.6/10.

== Awards ==
It won the audience award at the Tromsø International Film Festival in 2000.
