= Blue Bird (2011 film) =

2011 film

- Film poster
- Directed by: Gust Van Den Berghe
- Written by: Maurice Maeterlinck
- Based on: The Blue Bird; 1908 play by Maurice Maeterlinck
- Produced by: Tomas Leyers
- Starring: Bafiokadie Potey; Tene Potey
- Cinematography: Hans Bruch Jr.
- Edited by: David Verdurme
- Music by: Michelino Bisceglia
- Release date: 18 May 2011 (Cannes)
- Running time: 86 minutes
- Country: Belgium
- Language: French

Blue Bird is a 2011 Belgian drama film directed by Gust Van Den Berghe, based on the 1908 play by Maurice Maeterlinck. The film was shot in Togo and won a Special Mention at the 2011 Flanders International Film Festival Ghent. The film was also screened in the Directors' Fortnight section at the 2011 Cannes Film Festival.

== Plot summary ==
Two young siblings, Tyltyl and Mytyl, set out on a journey in search of the mystical Blue Bird, a symbol of happiness. Guided by magical figures, they travel through a series of dreamlike landscapes where they encounter personifications of elements from nature, memories of the dead, and visions of the future. Their encounters reveal lessons about life, death, and the meaning of joy. Although their quest seems to end without success, the children ultimately return home to discover that happiness was within their reach all along.

== Cast ==
- Bafiokadie Potey as Bafiokadie
- Tene Potey as Tene
