= Small Gods (film) =

2007 Belgian thriller film

- Directed by: Dimitri Karakatsanis
- Screenplay by: Dimitri Karakatsanis
- Starring: Titus De Voogdt
- Cinematography: Nicolas Karakatsanis
- Music by: Mark Lanegan; Aldo Struijf
- Release date: 2007
- Country: Belgium

Small Gods is a 2007 Belgian thriller film written and directed by Dimitri Karakatsanis, in his feature film debut.

The film premiered in the International Critics' Week section of the 64th edition of the Venice Film Festival.

== Plot ==
In the film, Elena (the main character) is kidnapped by Good Samaritan David after a suicidal car accident kills her son. Sara (a mute who escaped an insane asylum) joins them on their journey. During their journey, the three main characters strive for redemption while taking care of each other along the way.

== Cast ==
- Titus De Voogdt as David
- Steffi Peeters as Elena
- Marijke Pinoy as Moeder
- Simon Van Braeckel as Jeremy
- Dirk van Dijck as Advocaat
- Pieter Van Hees as Fisherman
- Louiza Vande Woestyne as Sarah
