= Achille Ridolfi =

Belgian actor

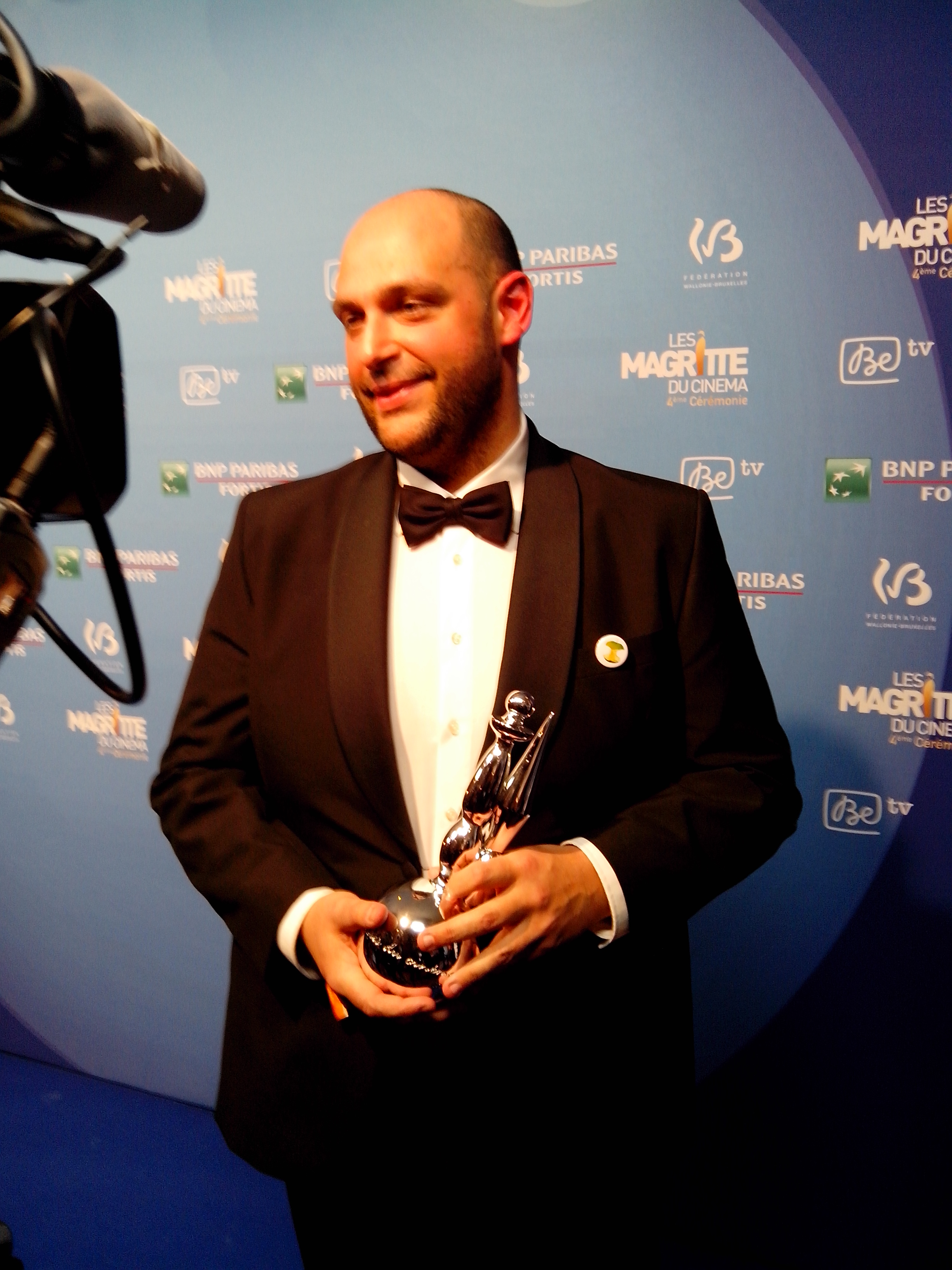
- Ridolfi at the 2013 Magritte Awards
- Born: 15 June 1979 (age 47); Liège, Belgium
- Education: Institut Supérieur des Arts
- Years active: 2007–present

Achille Ridolfi (born 15 June 1979) is a Belgian stage and film actor. He studied at the Institut Supérieur des Arts (INSAS) in Brussels and began working in theatre. His film and television credits include Erased (2012), In the Name of the Son (2012), The Brand New Testament (2015), The Break (2017), and Alone at My Wedding (2018).

He received a Magritte Award for Most Promising Actor for his performance in In the Name of the Son.

== Selected filmography ==
Year	Title	Role	Notes
2012	Erased	Karim's Bodyguard	
2012	In the Name of the Son	Achille	Magritte Award for Most Promising Actor
2014	All Yours (Je suis à toi)	Christophe	
2015	The Brand New Testament	Homme	
2017	The Break	Avocat	TV series
2018	Alone at My Wedding	David	
