= Cardinal Records (1964) =

Belgium record label

Cardinal Records was the name of a record label from Belgium founded in 1964 by Rocco Granata & Craeynest. Significant artists on the label included Louis Neefs and Jacques Raymond ("Ray Mondo").

In later years, Granata became the label's sole owner. The label in this later period concentrated primarily on Granata's own work.
