= The Break (TV series) =

French-language Belgian crime drama

- Original series poster
- French: La Trêve
- Genre: Crime drama
- Directed by: Matthieu Donck
- Starring: Yoann Blanc; Guillaume Kerbusch; Anne Coesens; Jasmina Douieb; Tom Audenaert; Sam Louwyck; Catherine Salée
- Country of origin: Belgium
- Original language: French
- No. of series: 2
- No. of episodes: 20

Production
- Producer: Anthony Rey
- Running time: 52 minutes
- Production company: RTBF

Original release
- Network: La Une; France 2 Netflix
- Release: 21 February 2016 – 9 December 2018

The Break (French: La Trêve, "The Truce") is a French-language Belgian crime drama television series, produced by Anthony Rey and directed by Matthieu Donck. It debuted on RTBF's La Une on 21 February 2016, on France 2 on 29 August 2016, and on Netflix in the United States, United Kingdom and Canada on 21 December 2016.

Season 2 premiered in Belgium on 11 November 2018. On 9 February 2019, it was released on Netflix in the United States and many other countries.

== Synopsis ==
=== Season 1 ===
Police detective Yoann Peeters moves from Brussels with his daughter, Camille, to his home town, where the body of a young African football player was pulled from the river. The death is originally thought to be a suicide, but Peeters suspects murder. In addition, there is corruption associated with gaining approval by farmers to sell their land to allow construction of a dam and reservoir.

=== Season 2 ===
Jasmina Orban, the psychiatrist calls back Yoann Peeters to help her prove the innocence of one of her patients, Dany Bastin. Dany, a former convict, was working as a gardener for wealthy owner Astrid du Tilleul, who was found murdered in the swimming pool of her house.

== Cast ==
=== Main ===
- Yoann Blanc as Detective Yoann Peeters
- Jasmina Douieb as Jasmina Orban, the psychiatrist
- Guillaume Kerbush as police inspector Sébastian Drummer
- Tom Audenaert as René Verselt
- Lara Hubinont as Marjorie
- Jean-Henri Compère as Rudy Geeraerts
- Sophie Breyer as Camille Peeters, Yoann's daughter
- Sophie Maréchal as Zoé Fischer

=== Season 1 ===
- Jérémy Zagba as Driss Assani, football player
- Anne Coesens as Inès Buisson
- Catherine Salée as Brigitte Fischer
- Thomas Mustin as Kevin Fischer
- Vincent Grass as Lucien Rabet
- Jean-Benoît Ugeux as Markus

=== Season 2 ===
- Aurélien Caeyman as Dany Bastin, the suspect
- Valérie Bauchau as Astrid du Tilleul, the victim
- Karim Barras as Karim Briquet
- Anne-Cécile Vandalem as Claudine, Astrid's sister
- Vincent Lecuyer as Tino, Claudine's husband
- Achille Ridolfi as the lawyer

== Episodes ==
=== Series 1 (2016) ===
No.	Title	Directed by	Written by	Original release date	BE viewers (millions)
1	"Episode 1"	Matthieu Donck	Stéphane Bergmans, Benjamin d'Aoust, Matthieu Donck	21 February 2016	.477
Following the death of his wife, Brussels detective Yoann Peeters moves to his childhood hometown of Heiderfeld with his daughter, Camille. The body of 19-year-old Driss Assani, a football player in the local club, is discovered in the Semois.
2	"Episode 2"	Matthieu Donck	Stéphane Bergmans, Benjamin d'Aoust, Matthieu Donck	21 February 2016	.398
Recluse Jean-François Lequais confesses to killing Driss, and the local police are happy to close the case. Yoann, however, does not believe Lequais is guilty.
3	"Episode 3"	Matthieu Donck	Stéphane Bergmans, Benjamin d'Aoust, Matthieu Donck	28 February 2016	.386
Yoann continues his investigation into Driss' death.
4	"Episode 4"	Matthieu Donck	Stéphane Bergmans, Benjamin d'Aoust, Matthieu Donck	28 February 2016	.356
Yoann and his team investigate the suicide note found near Driss and the cabbalistic signs at his apartment.
5	"Episode 5"	Matthieu Donck	Stéphane Bergmans, Benjamin d'Aoust, Matthieu Donck	6 March 2016	.349
Peeters digs into shady dealings at the soccer club and braces for a difficult conversation with Ines. The chief closes in on the menacing caller.
6	"Episode 6"	Matthieu Donck	Stéphane Bergmans, Benjamin d'Aoust, Matthieu Donck	6 March 2016	.315
Jeff leads Peeters and Drummer to a chilling scene in the woods. The battle over the dam takes a new turn, and Camile's frustrations boil over.
7	"Episode 7"	Matthieu Donck	Stéphane Bergmans, Benjamin d'Aoust, Matthieu Donck	13 March 2016	.321
While Peeters questions the author of the fake suicide note, the chief makes an unsettling discovery. Panic sends Kevin into a dangerous spiral.
8	"Episode 8"	Matthieu Donck	Stéphane Bergmans, Benjamin d'Aoust, Matthieu Donck	13 March 2016	.287
The mystery about Driss, Heiderfeld and Yoann unravels further more. Yoann finally hears why his psychiatrist is questioning him.
9	"Episode 9"	Matthieu Donck	Stéphane Bergmans, Benjamin d'Aoust, Matthieu Donck	20 March 2016	.381
Romantic revelations and news of a local's dark past shake up the investigation once again. When Sebastian goes AWOL, Marjo faces a dilemma.
10	"Episode 10"	Matthieu Donck	Stéphane Bergmans, Benjamin d'Aoust, Matthieu Donck	20 March 2016	.354
As memories come flooding back to Peeters, the pieces of the puzzle begin to fall into place. But he can't shake the feeling that something is amiss.

=== Series 2 (2018) ===
No.	Title	Directed by	Written by	Original release date	BE viewers (millions)
1	"Episode 1"	Matthieu Donck	Stéphane Bergmans, Benjamin d'Aoust, Matthieu Donck	11 November 2018	.330
When therapist Jasmina Orban learns that her patient Dany Bastin is accused of murder in a botched investigation, she talks about a miscarriage of justice and asks for help from a man she trusts. But Yoann Peeters is no longer an investigator ...
2	"Episode 2"	Matthieu Donck	Stéphane Bergmans, Benjamin d'Aoust, Matthieu Donck	11 November 2018	.302
Under pressure, Dany Bastin confesses to the crime of Madame Du Tilleul: a boon for the local police who leads the investigation against him. For their part, Yoann and Jasmina are interested in the case of Clemence Lorent: the first alleged murder of Dany Bastin. It seems that back in 2009, this investigation had been botched as well.
3	"Episode 3"	Matthieu Donck	Stéphane Bergmans, Benjamin d'Aoust, Matthieu Donck	18 November 2018	N/A
Yoann finds evidence that Dany confessed under duress. Additional evidence is uncovered about the hours leading up to Astrid du Tilleul's murder. Yoann speaks to a doctor who was treating Astrid. Claudine is making plans for her new found wealth.
4	"Episode 4"	Matthieu Donck	Stéphane Bergmans, Benjamin d'Aoust, Matthieu Donck	18 November 2018	N/A
Claudine surprises Tino with a gift. Dinner with the neighbors proves unsettling for Yoann and Camille. Tensions flare among the squatters in the woods.
5	"Episode 5"	Matthieu Donck	Stéphane Bergmans, Benjamin d'Aoust, Matthieu Donck	25 November 2018	N/A
A new detail about the murder scene outs Yoann on the hunt for a mysterious art collective. Dany's theft gets him in trouble in prison.
6	"Episode 6"	Matthieu Donck	Stéphane Bergmans, Benjamin d'Aoust, Matthieu Donck	25 November 2018	N/A
The day of Myriam's show, Camille and Yoann each make alarming discoveries. Karim and Marjo investigate the break in at du Tilleul's home.
7	"Episode 7"	Matthieu Donck	Stéphane Bergmans, Benjamin d'Aoust, Matthieu Donck	2 December 2018	N/A
A call from Dany sends Jasmina racing to the prison, but someone else gets there first. When police clear the camp, Boris and Pierrot drop in on Tino.
8	"Episode 8"	Matthieu Donck	Stéphane Bergmans, Benjamin d'Aoust, Matthieu Donck	2 December 2018	N/A
Convinced that Coralie holds the key to solving the case, Yoann goes to extremes to find out what she saw. Karim scrambles to cover up a mistake.
9	"Episode 9"	Matthieu Donck	Stéphane Bergmans, Benjamin d'Aoust, Matthieu Donck	9 December 2018	N/A
Marjo takes a big step, a re-energized Yoann turns his attention to another suspect, and Jasmina realizes Dany may know more than he's letting on.
10	"Episode 10"	Matthieu Donck	Stéphane Bergmans, Benjamin d'Aoust, Matthieu Donck	9 December 2018	N/A
Dizzying revelations force Yoann to rethink everything about the case -- and push him ever closer to the brink.

== Production ==
La Trêve is produced by Helicotronc, in co-production with RTBF and Proximus. It received €1.18 million ($1.5 million) from the new Wallonie Brussels Federation-RTBF Fund for Belgian Series and the Wallimage Bruxellimage regional economic fund. The series is filmed in the Ardennes. It is the first French-language Belgian television crime drama.

== Release ==
La Trêve premiered on 21 February 2016 RTBF's La Une, and received an average audience share of 22.5%.

== Music ==
Belgian band Balthazar's song "The Man Who Owns The Place" plays during the opening credits of each episode of the first season.

The original score composed by Eloi Ragot is available on digital platforms.

=== International distribution ===
- Belgium (Flemish): Canvas – 8 October 2016
- France: France 2 – 29 August 2016
- Switzerland: RTS – 22 June 2016
- United States / United Kingdom / Canada: Netflix – 21 December 2016
