= Dandelion Game =

1998 film

Blazen tot Honderd
- Directed by: Peter van Wijk
- Written by: Geert van Beek (novel), Peter van Wijk (writer)
- Distributed by: Corsan producties BV
- Release date: May 20, 1998
- Running time: 80 minutes
- Countries: Netherlands; Belgium
- Languages: Dutch; Flemish

Dandelion Game or Blazen tot Honderd is a 1998 Dutch-Flemish film directed by Peter van Wijk.

== Cast ==
- Olivier Tuinier ... Maurits
- Marie Vinck ... Moniek
- Herbert Flack ... Vader
- Hilde Van Mieghem ... Moeder
- Wouter ten Pas ... Pompbediende
- Dora van der Groen ... Kerkkoorleidster
