= Marina (2013 film) =

- Directed by: Stijn Coninx
- Written by: Rik D'Hiet
- Produced by: Peter Bouckaert
- Starring: Matteo Simoni; Evelien Bosmans; Luigi Lo Cascio; Donatella Finocchiaro
- Cinematography: Lou Berghmans
- Edited by: Philippe Ravoet
- Music by: Michelino Bisceglia
- Production company: Eyeworks
- Release dates: 23 August 2013 (Montréal World Film Festival); 6 November 2013 (Belgium)
- Country: Belgium
- Languages: Dutch, Italian
- Box office: $4,998,164

Marina is a biographical film released in 2013 and directed by Stijn Coninx. The film is based upon the life of the Italian singer Rocco Granata who moved to Belgium when he was a young boy. It features Matteo Simoni as Rocco Granata and Evelien Bosmans as Helena. Most part of the film is in Italian as Rocco's parents did not speak the Dutch language. Other parts are in Dutch and some dialogues in French and English.

The film was first shown at the Montreal World Film Festival on 25 August 2013. It was released in Belgium in November. The film won a Golden Award at the Ostend Film Festival and the "publics favorite award" at the Valladolid International Film Festival. The movie contains a cameo, with Rocco Granata himself playing the role of the salesmen that sells him his first instrument.

== Plot ==
Salvatore Granata is a rather poor man who lives with his wife, son and daughter in Calabria in Italy. One day Salvatore decides to move to Belgium to work in the coal mine of Waterschei as a Gastarbeiter. His family will stay in Italy as Salvatore will only be in Belgium for three years. He hopes to earn much money in a rather small timeframe so he can buy a forge for his son Rocco who is now still a 9-year-old boy. After a year, Salvatore decides his family should be with him, so they also move to Belgium. They soon discover the life of a gastarbeider is difficult: they have to live in some kind of barracks, they are neglected by the Belgian people and they do not earn much. They are astonished when they hear Salvatore signed a contract of five years and male children of gastarbeiders are ought to work in the mines as soon they leave high school. Rocco meets Helena, the daughter of the local grocer shop. However, the man is a racist and forbids his daughter to play with Italian boys.

Ten years pass and Salvatore still works in the mines. They now live in a house they rent from the mine. Rocco takes accordion lessons. One day, he falls off his bicycle and his accordion is broken. His music teacher advises him to buy a new accordion, but Rocco's father refuses as he does not want to invest in the musical instrument. It turns out Rocco is a rather good mechanic and he gets an apprenticeship in the local automobile repair shop. Rocco's mother Ida earns some money by washing and ironing the clothes of other gastarbeiders. Salvatore, who is a selfish, jealous patriarch is unaware of Ida's job. Rocco uses his savings (as well as a part of Ida's money) to buy a new accordion. He can spend up to ten thousand Belgian francs, but the store owner (played by the real Rocco Granata) asks 25 000 francs for the accordion he wants to buy. However, after Rocco plays him some songs, the store owner is impressed and agrees to let Rocco buy the instrument on credit.

Rocco once again meets Helena. She convinces Rocco to enter a talent contest. Rocco wins, but then Helena, unaware of his secret, tells Salvatore where his son got the money. Salvatore is furious and forbids his son to play the accordion. However, Rocco sneakily goes to pubs and bars to play with his music group "The International Quintet". One day, the group is arrested by the police as they do not have a "professional card". Rocco requests such card from the Ministry, but this is refused as he is the son of a gastarbeider. Rocco then asks a con man to make him fake cards.

Meanwhile, Helena has started a relationship with Renaat, a rich snob. Both want to go to the university in Leuven. One day, Rocco has to check the car of Renaat, but he forgets to fill the oil. The car breaks down and the owner of the automobile repair shop puts an end to Rocco's apprenticeship. Helena realizes she does not love Renaat and she ends the relationship. She meets with Rocco and they sleep together. Renaat watches as Rocco leaves.

The next morning, Rocco goes to a recording studio to record a single (a promoter was in attendance at a performance of "The International Quintet" and wants to record their song "Manuela", and the song "Marina" will be recorded for the B-side). When Rocco returns home, he is arrested by the police as he is identified as the wrongdoer who raped Helena the night before. Although he proclaims his innocence the police do not believe him. Only after two witnesses declare Rocco did not rape Helena (Renaat was the wrongdoer), he is set free. Some time later, Rocco wants to visit Helena but she has moved to live with her aunt in the United States.

There is also more bad news: the recording company does not want to release the single as "nobody is interested in a boy playing the accordion". Rocco decides to buy all the singles to distribute them in Waterschei himself. His father is still angry as he does not want his son to be a professional musician. Some days later, Salvatore is involved in an occupational injury and hurts his leg. After he wakes up, it seems he also has tinnitus. The board of the mine decides Salvatore can't work anymore in the mines due to the tinnitus. He will get a disability allowance for six months; after that he also has to leave the house. The board will pay for the incident with the leg, but claim they are not responsible for the tinnitus.

The song Marina becomes an unexpected international success. Rocco heads to the US to promote his songs. During a performance in Carnegie Hall, he forgives his father who now is proud of his son. There is also an unexpected attendee in the audience: Helena.

== Cast ==
- Matteo Simoni as Rocco Granata in his teens
- Cristian Campagna as a young Rocco Granata
- Maite Redal as Wanda
- Luigi Lo Cascio as Salvatore Granata
- Donatella Finocchiaro as Ida
- Evelien Bosmans as Helena Somers
- Warre Borgmans as Mister Somers
- Jelle Florizoone as Ward
- Chris Van den Durpel as Tony Bruno
- Vincent Grass as Chairman Ministry
- Wim Willaert as music teacher
- Rocco Granata as sales man
- Mattias Van de Vijver as Renaat, lover of Helena
- Landerik Boie as young Renaat
- Marte Bosmans as young Helena Somers

== Reception ==
The film mostly had positive reviews. Matteo Simoni is praised for his acting as he had to learn the Italian language. Only Knack's opinion is that the film has too many caricatures and is too slow. The film received five nominations at the 5th Magritte Awards, winning three, including Best Flemish Film.

== Trivia ==
- Whilst celebrating the 500,000th visitor in Belgian theatres, Rocco Granata told the press there never was a rape. This storyline was made up by the writers to have more suspense.
- Salvatore Granata was not as strict as portrayed in the movie.
