= In the Name of the Son (2012 film) =

2012 film

- Film poster
- Directed by: Vincent Lannoo
- Written by: Albert Charles; Philippe Falardeau; Vincent Lannoo
- Starring: Astrid Whettnall; Philippe Nahon; Achille Ridolfi
- Music by: Michelino Bisceglia
- Release dates: 29 September 2012 (Namur); 3 April 2013 (Belgium)
- Running time: 80 minutes
- Countries: Belgium; France
- Language: French

In the Name of the Son (French: Au nom du fils) is a 2012 black comedy film directed by Vincent Lannoo, who wrote the film with Albert Charles and Philippe Falardeau. It had its world premiere at the Namur Film Festival on 29 September 2012.

The film received seven nominations at the 2013 Magritte Awards, including Best Film and Best Director for Lannoo, winning Most Promising Actor for Achille Ridolfi.

== Cast ==
- Astrid Whettnall as Elisabeth
- Philippe Nahon as Father Taon
- Achille Ridolfi as Achille
- Albert Chassagne-Baradat
- Zacharie Chasseriaud as Jean-Charles
- Lionel Bourguet
- Jacky Nercessian

== Accolades ==
Award / Film Festival	Category	Recipients and nominees	Result
Karlovy Vary International Film Festival	Independent Camera Award	Vincent Lannoo	Nominated
Magritte Award	Best Film		Nominated
Magritte Award	Best Director	Vincent Lannoo	Nominated
Magritte Award	Best Actress	Astrid Whettnall	Nominated
Magritte Award	Best Supporting Actress	Dominique Baeyens	Nominated
Magritte Award	Most Promising Actor	Achille Ridolfi	Won
Magritte Award	Best Sound	Philippe Charbonnel, Guilhem Donzel, Matthieu Michaux	Nominated
Magritte Award	Best Original Score	Michel Bisceglia	Nominated
Méliès International Festivals Federation	Méliès d'Or		Won
Montréal Festival of New Cinema	Best Film		Nominated
Namur Film Festival	Best Film		Nominated
Namur Film Festival	BeTV Award	Vincent Lannoo	Won
Neuchâtel International Film Festival	Best European Fantastic Film		Won
Ramdam Award	Film of the Year		Won
