= Philippe Blasband =

Belgian writer, playwright, director and screenwriter

Philippe Blasband (born 26 July 1964 in Tehran, Iran) is a filmmaker and a writer in French language from Belgium. He is of Jewish origin and lives in Brussels.

== Work ==
=== Novels ===
  - De cendres et de fumées, Gallimard (1990) - Prix Rossel
  - L'Effet-cathédrale, Gallimard (1994)
  - Max et Minnie, Gallimard (1996)
  - Le Livre des Rabinovitch, Le Castor Astral (1998)
  - Johnny Bruxelles, Grasset (2005)
  - Irina Poignet, Le Castor Astral (2008), novel based on the scenario of Irina Palm

=== Short stories ===
  - Quand j'étais sumo (Le Castor Astral, 2000)

=== Non-fiction ===
  - Le petit garçon qui parlait dans les cocktails, Climax Editions (2007) - included in DVD edition of La couleur des mots

=== Films (as writer) ===
==== Short films ====
  - Bon anniversaire, Sergent Bob (de Frédéric Fonteyne)
  - les Vloems (1989) (de Frédéric Fonteyne)
  - La Ballade de Billie (1989) (de Geneviève Mersch)
  - La Modestie (1992) (in Les sept péchés capitaux) (de Frédéric Fonteyne)
  - Le courage (1992) (in Les sept péchés capitaux)(de Geneviève Mersch)
  - Bob le déplorable (1993) (de Frédéric Fonteyne)
  - John (1994) (de Geneviève Mersch)
  - Doucement (1997) (de Jacques Decrop)
  - La Dinde (1999) (de Sam Garbarski)
  - Joyeux Noël Rachid (2000) (de Sam Garbarski)
  - La Vie, la Mort et le Foot (2000) (de Sam Garbarski)

==== Feature films ====
  - Ellas (1997) (dir. Luís Galvao Teles) : French dialogues
  - Max et Bobo (1998) (dir. Frédéric Fonteyne)
  - Abracadabra (1998) (dir. Harry Cleven)co-written with Harry Cleven
  - Une liaison pornographique (1999) (dir. Frédéric Fonteyne avec Sergi López et Nathalie Baye)
  - Thomas est amoureux (2000) (dir. Pierre-Paul Renders)
  - L'amour en suspens (2000) dir. Herman Van Eycken : dialogues
  - Deuxième quinzaine de juillet (2000) (dir. Christophe Reichert) co-written with Christophe Reichert
  - Le Tango Rashevski (2002) (dir. Sam Garbarski) co-written with Sam Garbarski
  - J'ai toujours voulu être une sainte (2002) (dir. Geneviève Mersch) co-written with Geneviève Mersch and Anne Fournier
  - Mariées mais pas trop (2003) (dir. Catherine Corsini) co-written with Catherine Corsini and Christophe Morand
  - Nathalie... (2003) (dir. Anne Fontaine): original screenplay, under title: Nathalie Ribout
  - La Femme de Gilles (2004) (dir. Frédéric Fonteyne) co-written with Marion Hänsel and Frédéric Fonteyne after novel by Belgian writer Madeleine Bourdouxhe - Joseph Plateau Award for Best Belgian Screenplay
  - Irina Palm (2006) (dir. Sam Garbarski) co-written with Martin Herron
  - Nuits d'Arabie (2007) (dir. Paul Kieffer) co-written with Paul Kieffer
  - A Distant Neighborhood (2010) (dir. Sam Garbarski) co-written with Jérôme Tonerre, after original graphic novel by Jirô Taniguchi)
  - The Assistant (2015)

=== Films (as director and writer) ===
==== Short films ====
  - W. C. (1991)
  - CHA CHA CHA (1998)
  - MIREILLE ET LUCIEN with Aylin Yay and Serge Larivière (2001)

Festivals : Clermont-Ferrand, Locarno, Valenciennes, Dresde, Cannes (La nuit la plus courte, Critic's week),…

==== Feature films ====
- Step by Step (An honest dealer aka Step by step) (2002) Official website

Featuring Benoît Verhaert, Philippe Noiret, Yolande Moreau, Serge Larivière Selected in Venice & Montreal Festivals

- LA COULEUR DES MOTS (The colour of words) (2005) Official website

Selected in Montréal, Valladolid, Amiens, Namur, Sousse, Madrid, Brive, Moscow Best actress award for Aylin Yay & Signis Prize in Amiens Best actress award for Aylin Yay & Audience award in Brive

- COQUELICOTS (Red Poppies) (2007) Official website

Selected for festivals of : Valladolid, Amiens, Beauvais, Rouen, Mons, Moustier, UGC Fête de l’Europe, Rabat, Split, Mexico, Moncton, Namur, São Paulo

- Maternelle (Motherly) (2009) Official website

Featuring Aylin Yay, Anne Girouard, Chloé Struvay, Nathalie Laroche, Cédric Juliens

=== Theatre ===
==== as writer ====
  - La Lettre des chats, Ed Lansman (1992)
  - Apôtres
  - Une chose intime
  - Où es-tu Sammy Rebenski ?
  - Jef
  - Le Masque du dragon
  - L'argent du ministre
  - Les Mangeuses de chocolat, Ed Lansman (1996)
  - L'Invisible, Ed Hayez-Lansman (2004)
  - Une aventure de Simon Rapoport, guerrier de l'espace
  - Pitch
  - Une liaison pornographique, Actes Sud-Papiers, 2003 (suivi de Nathalie Ribout)
  - Le Village oublié d'au-delà des montagnes
  - Nathalie Ribout, Actes Sud-Papiers, 2003
  - Les témoins, Hayez-Lansman, 2005
  - Paternel (2009)
  - Fragile
  - Après Anatole
  - Le Jeu des cigognes et de l'enfer
  - Rue du Croissant

==== as director ====
  - FILATURES – spectacle collectif
  - LES SEPT JOURS DE SIMON LABROSSE de Carole FRÉCHETTE
  - UNE CHOSE INTIME
  - JEF
  - PITCH
  - LE MASQUE DU DRAGON
  - LES MANGEUSES DE CHOCOLAT
  - UNE AVENTURE DE SIMON RAPOPORT, GUERRIER DE L'ESPACE
  - Macbeth (à deux) based on Shakespeare's play
  - LES MILLE ET UNE NUITS (One Thousand and One Nights)
  - LES TEMOINS
  - PATERNEL création en 2009 au Théâtre Le Public à Bruxelles

== Awards ==
=== Won ===
- 1990: Prix Rossel for De cendres et de fumées
- 2005: The Joseph Plateau Award, Best Belgian Screenplay (Beste Belgische Scenario) for La Femme de Gilles (2004).
- 2005: Signis Prize for LA COULEUR DES MOTS - Amiens Film Festival
- 2005: Audience Award for LA COULEUR DES MOTS - Brive Film Festival
- 2014: Magritte Award, Best Screenplay, for Tango libre (2012)

=== Nominated ===
- 2002: Grand Prix des Amériques, for Step by Step (2002)
- 2004: The Joseph Plateau Award, Best Belgian Screenplay, for Le Tango des Rashevski (2003)
- 2012: Magritte Award, Best Screenplay, for Romantics Anonymous (2010)
- 2014: Magritte Award, Best Screenplay, for Vijay and I (2013)

== Bibliography ==
- Hennuy, Jean-Frédéric, L'Effet Blasband ou Le Regard Persan (New York etc., Peter Lang, 2011) (Belgian Francophone Library, 22).
