= Vincent Lannoo =

Belgian film director and writer (born 1970)

- Born: 1970 (age 55–56); Brussels, Belgium
- Education: Institut des Arts de Diffusion
- Occupations: Director; writer
- Years active: 1998–present

Vincent Lannoo (born 1970) is a Belgian film director and writer.

== Career ==
After developing an interest in filmmaking, Lannoo enrolled at the Institut des Arts de Diffusion in Brussels and graduated from there in 1995. His first short film, I Love the Movies (1998), was screened at the 1999 Brussels Film Festival, where it won both the Crystal Star for Best European Short and the Golden Iris for Lannoo.

Lannoo made his feature-length debut in 2001 with Strass, an experimental film in which elements of reality and fiction are mixed together at a drama school. Strass is the twentieth film in the Dogme 95 film movement and its title is a reference to American acting teacher Lee Strasberg. It premiered at the 2001 Namur Film Festival, where it competed for the Bayard d'Or for Best Film and went on to win Best First Screenplay.

His film In the Name of the Son starred Astrid Whettnall as a Catholic radio host who stands up against the hypocrisy of the Catholic Church after the suicide of her son. Upon release, the film was met with general acclaim from critics, although its religious references and depiction of violence sparked controversy. At the 4th Magritte Awards, In the Name of the Son received seven nominations, including Best Film and Best Director for Lannoo. It also received the Méliès d'Or, given by the Méliès International Festivals Federation to the best work of speculative fiction from Europe.
