= Madeleine Bourdouxhe =

Belgian writer

Madeleine Bourdouxhe

Madeleine Bourdouxhe (25 September 1906 – 17 April 1996) was a Belgian writer.

== Biography ==
Madeleine Bourdouxhe was born in Liège, Belgium, to Elise (née Moreau) and Julien Bourdouxhe. They moved to France in 1914, moving a number of times until settling in Paris for the duration of World War I. In 1918, she returned with her family to Liège and then moved with them to Brussels. In 1926, she began to study philosophy at the Université libre de Bruxelles. In 1927, she married a mathematics teacher, Jacques Muller, a marriage which lasted until his death in 1974. Her daughter, Marie, was born the day the Germans invaded Belgium, 6 May 1940. She fled with her husband to a small village near Bordeaux, but was forced by the government in exile to return to Brussels, and remained there, active in the Belgian Resistance.

After the war, she lived regularly in Paris and had contact with writers such as Simone de Beauvoir, Raymond Queneau and Jean-Paul Sartre, and also with painters such as René Magritte and Paul Delvaux. Her last novel, À la recherche de Marie, was published in 1943. She avoided publishing after Gallimard turned down her manuscript of Mantoue est trop loin in 1956.

Bourdouxhe was rediscovered in the 1980s, resulting in new editions and translations.

She died in Brussels on 17 April 1996, aged 89.

== Works ==
- La Femme de Gilles (Gallimard, 1937). Trans. Faith Evans (Lime Tree, 1992; Daunt Books, 2014; Melville House, 2016)
- À la recherche de Marie (Éditions Libris, 1943). Marie, trans. Faith Evans (Bloomsbury, 1997)
  - Republished in French as Wagram 17-42, Marie attend Marie (Éditions Tierce, 1989)
- Sous le pont Mirabeau (Éditions Lumière, 1944)
- Sept Nouvelles (Éditions Tierce, 1984)
- Vacances (written 1935, unpublished)
- Mantoue est trop loin (written 1956; published posthumously by Éditions Névrosée, 2019)
- Le Voyageur fatigué (unpublished)

Compilations in English

- A Nail, A Rose and Other Stories (The Women's Press, 1989; Pushkin Press, 2019). Translations by Faith Evans of Sept Nouvelles and Sous le pont Mirabeau.

== Adaptations of her work ==
- La Femme de Gilles, 2004 Belgian drama film

== Sources ==
- Faith Evans, Epilogue. In Madeleine Bourdouxhe, Auf der Suche nach Marie. Piper Verlag, München 1998, 170–186.
- Faith Evans, Epilogue. In Madeleine Bourdouxhe, Vacances. Die letzten großen Ferien. Piper Verlag, München 2002, 143–152.
- Cécile Kovacshazy (Ed.), Relire Madeleine Bourdouxhe. Regards croisés sur son œuvre littéraire (Collection Documents pour l'histoire des francophonies; Bd. 25). Lang, Brüssel 2011, ISBN 978-90-5201-794-5.
- Jacques Layani: Écrivains contemporains. Madeleine Bourdouxhe, Paul Guimard, Maurice Pons, Roger Vaillant. L'Harmattan, Paris 1999; ISBN 2-7384-7483-7
