= Figline Vegliaturo =

- Comune
- Comune di Figline Vegliaturo
- Location within Italy Location within Calabria
- Coordinates: 39°14′N 16°20′E
- Country: Italy
- Region: Calabria
- Province: Cosenza (CS)

Government
  - Mayor: Fedele Adamo

Area
  - Total: 4.16 km^{2} (1.61 sq mi)
- Elevation: 705 m (2,313 ft)

Population (2018-01-01)
  - Total: 1,025
  - Density: 246/km^{2} (638/sq mi)
- Demonym: Figlinesi
- Time zone: UTC+1 (CET)
  - Summer (DST): UTC+2 (CEST)
- Postal code: 87050
- Dialing code: 0984
- Patron saint: St. Liberata
- Website: Official website

Figline Vegliaturo is a town and comune in the province of Cosenza in the Calabria region of southern Italy.

It is the birthplace of singer Rocco Granata.
