= Vijay and I =

2013 film by Sam Garbarski

- Film poster
- Directed by: Sam Garbarski
- Screenplay by: Matthew Robbins
- Story by: Sam Garbarski
- Based on: a screenplay by Philippe Blasband
- Produced by: Sébastien Delloye
- Starring: Moritz Bleibtreu; Patricia Arquette
- Cinematography: Alain Duplantier
- Release date: August 8, 2013 (Locarno Festival)
- Running time: 96 minutes
- Countries: Belgium; Germany; Luxembourg
- Language: English

Vijay and I is a comedy film directed by Sam Garbarski and starring Moritz Bleibtreu and Patricia Arquette.

== Cast ==
- Moritz Bleibtreu as Will
- Patricia Arquette as Julia
- Danny Pudi as Rad
- Catherine Missal as Lily
- Michael Imperioli as Micky
