= Viviane de Muynck =

Belgian actress

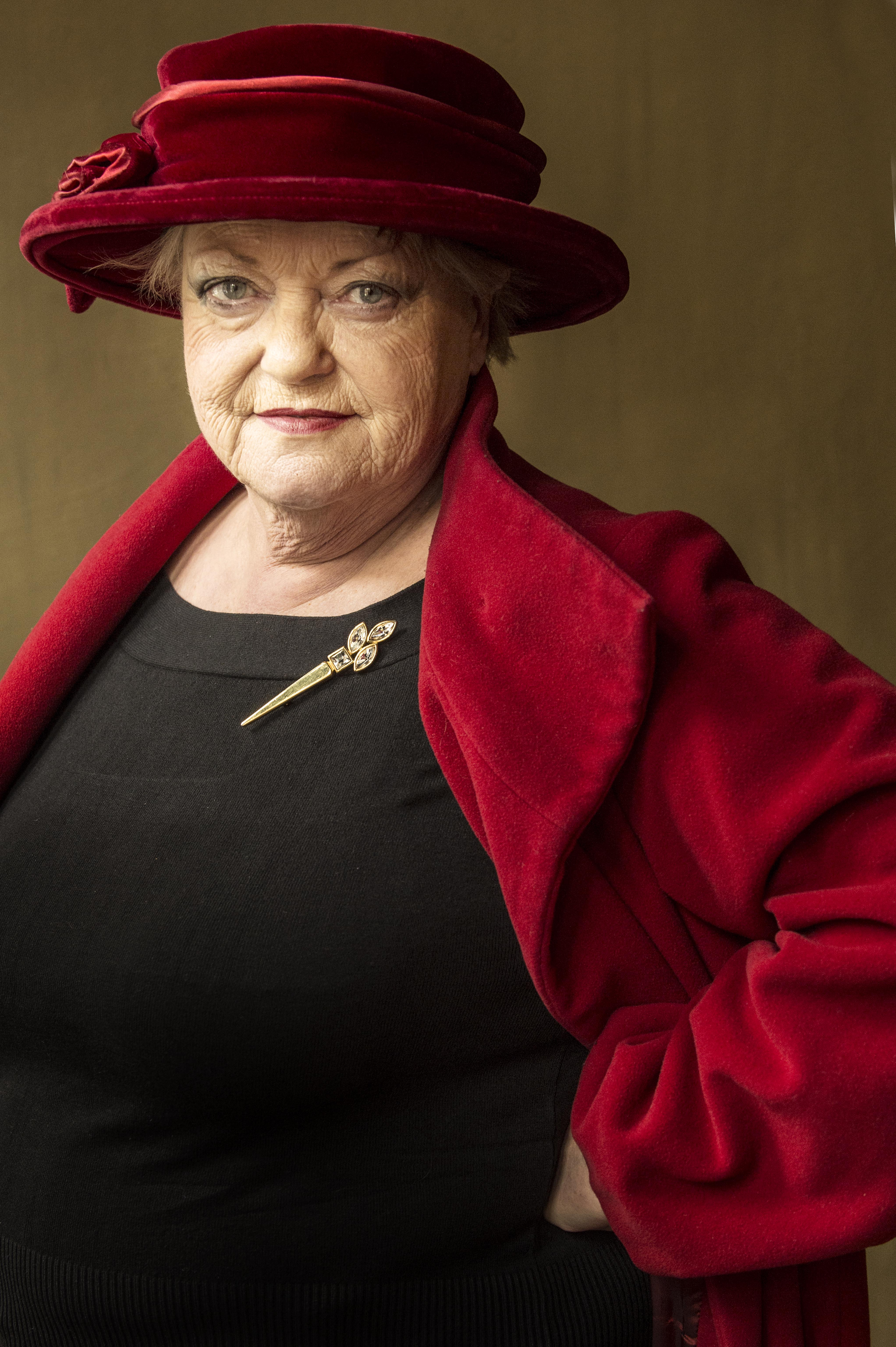
- Viviane De Muynck in 2013
- Born: 1946 (age 79–80); Mortsel, Belgium
- Occupation: Actress
- Years active: 1982-present

Viviane de Muynck (born 1946) is a Belgian actress. She has appeared in more than sixty films since 1982.

== Selected filmography ==
Year	Title	Role	Notes
1991	Elias		
2004	Sweet Jam	Gerda	
2006	The Only One		
2011	Hotel Swooni	Violette	
2015	Me and Kaminski	Anna	
2015	The Ardennes		
2023	Olga's Eyes	Olga	Screened at Athens Short Film Festival 2025
2026	Le Faux Soir		
