= Ensemble Leporello =

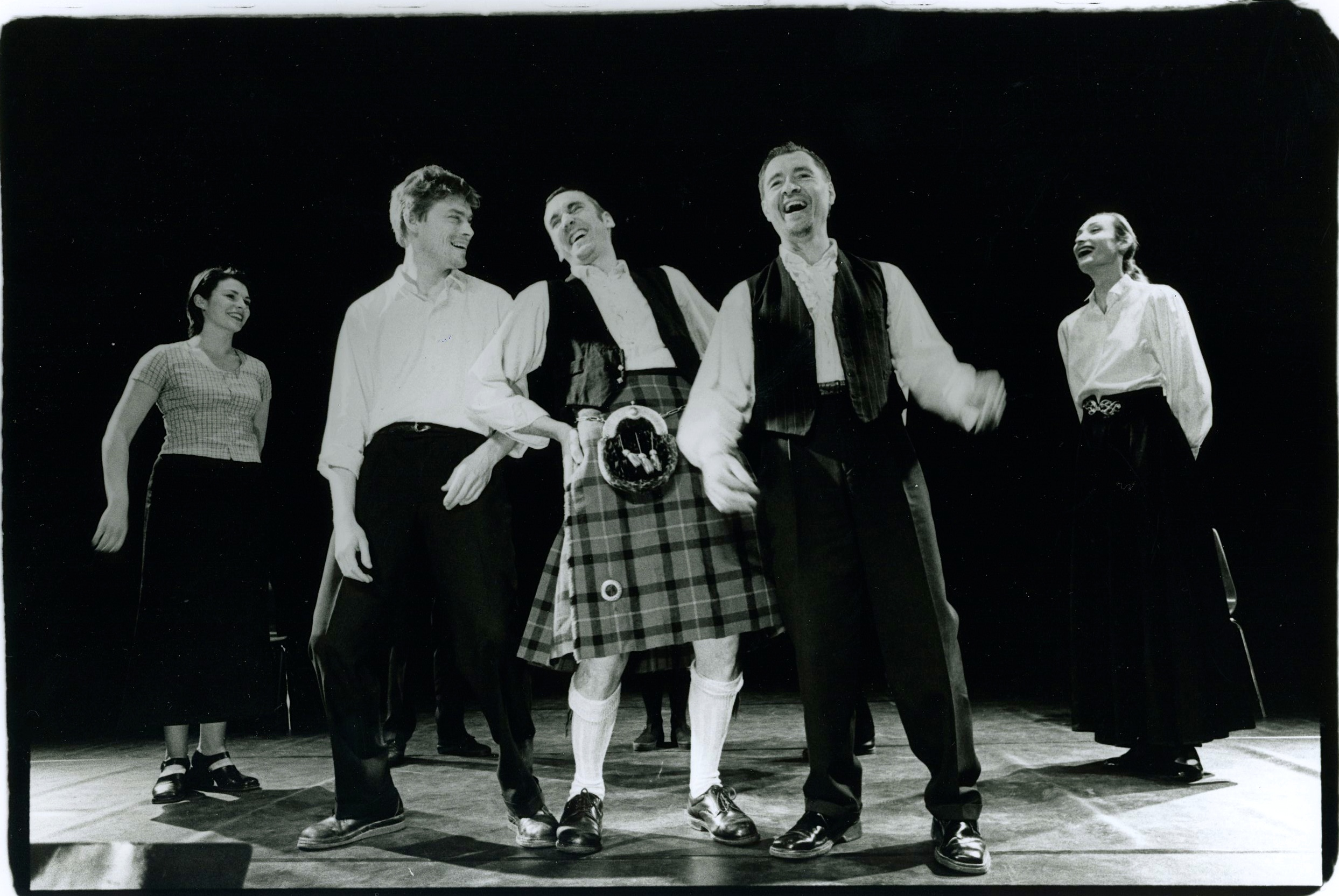
Tartuffe (1996)

Ensemble Leporello is one of the oldest independent theatre ensembles in Flanders, Belgium. Brussels based, and subsidized by the Flemish Ministry of Culture, the award-winning group tours its multi-lingual, highly stylized and musical adaptions of classic texts in many European countries.

== History ==
The company was founded by Dirk Opstaele and Judith Vindevogel in 1985, the year of the creation of Leporello's first piece, “Herz und Schmerz” (Ancienne Belgique, Brussels). This was the start for a ‘never ending’ tour and permanent creation of more than 40 works and circa a thousand venues.

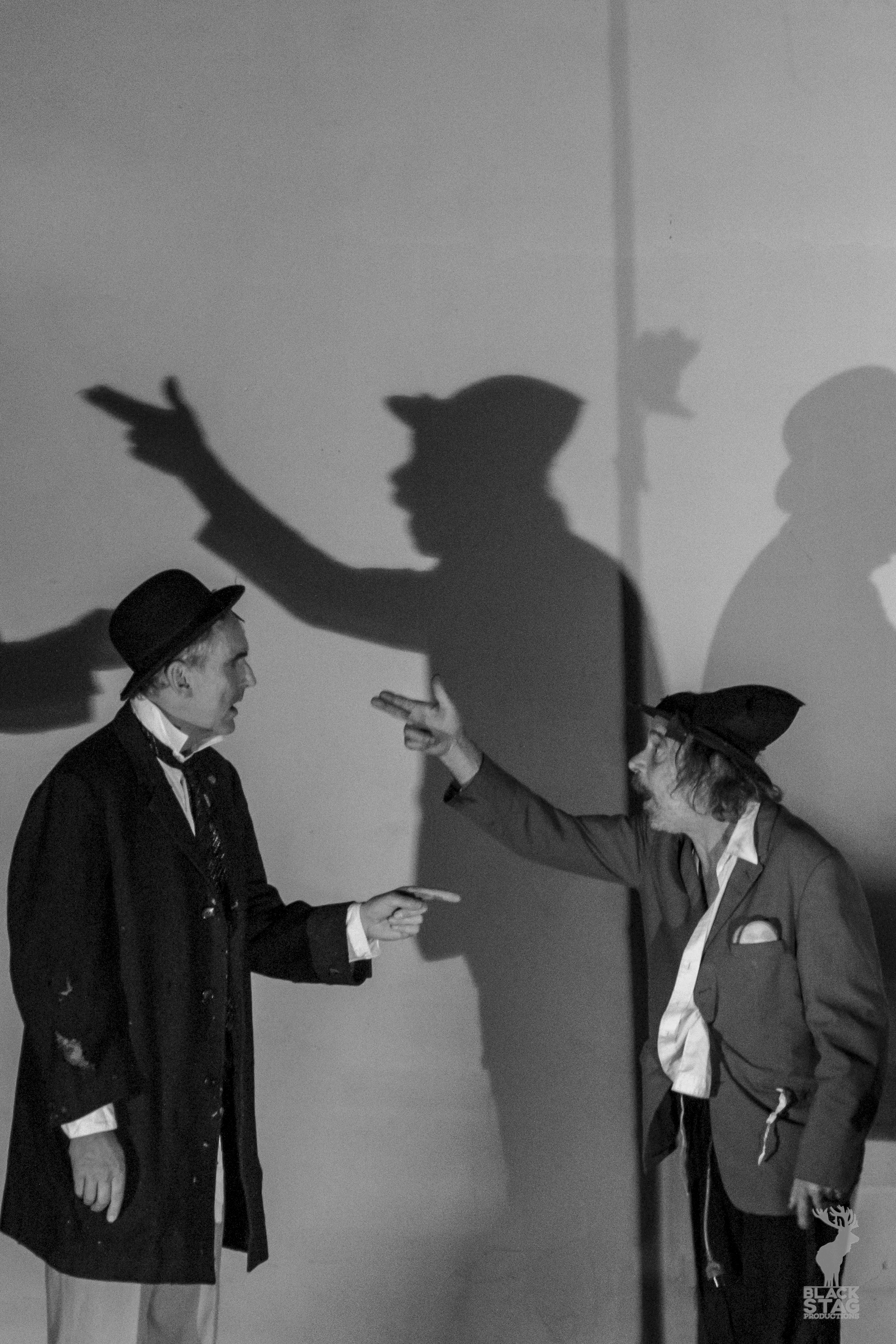
Gordon Wilson & Karel Cremers in Waiting for Godot

From 1990 on, the company acquired a reputation for its ‘unplugged’ way of staging classics. Helmsman Dirk Opstaele, trained at the Lecoq School in Paris, forged a unique style of ‘essential theatre’ where physicality, vocal orchestration and mise-en-scène are equally valid syntactical elements. Opstaele's work in the field of opera (collaborating with Moshe Leiser and Patrice Caurier), his training with Jacques Lecoq and ‘rhythm-guru’ Fernand Schirren and his past as a visual artist led him to recreate a modern form of pre-bourgeois theatre with a minimum of props or settings.

Sophocles, Aeschylos, Shakespeare, Molière, Marivaux, Chekhov e.a. were thus produced on an empty stage, with no machinery, scenery or technology. In Leporello's ‘dogma’, the ‘organism of the performing collectif’ is the sole provider of meaning and emotion. The use of (often lyrical trained) vocality, the care for rhythm and physical presence and a highly orchestrated way of organizing the cast result in a form of essential, ‘pre-bourgeois’ theatre with elements of Greek tragedy, story-telling, commedia dell’arte, dance and opera. Leporello annually provides a repertoire of seven titles, in different languages, ranging from classical to contemporary. The plays are programmed in Belgian and European theatres and festivals, and run for many years.

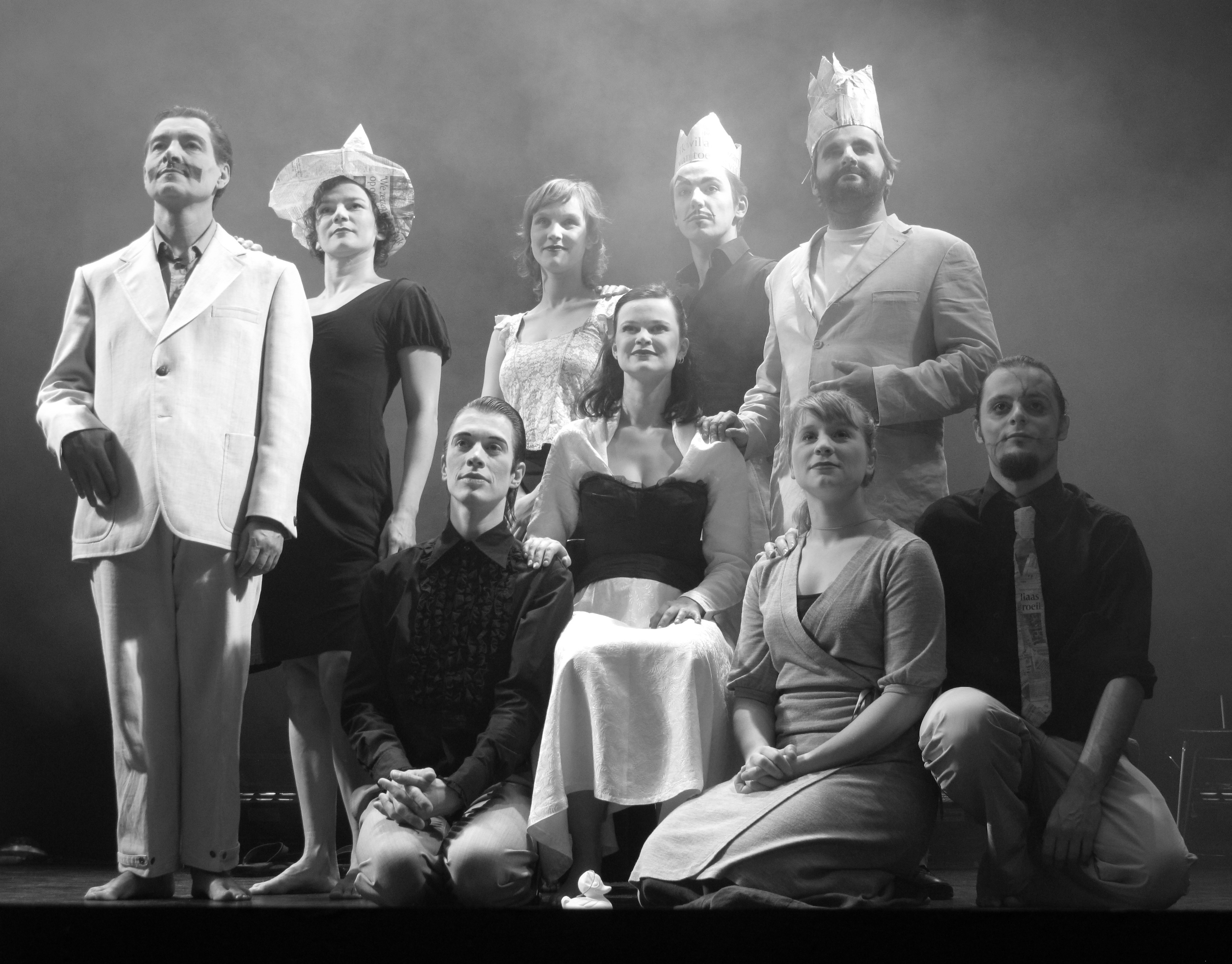
Macbeth Reloaded (2007)

== Style of theatre ==
Ensemble Leporello's theatre style is based on the belief that theatre has something that no other art form equals, something ancient and forever young, a way of communicating that sprouts in all times and in all cultures. How simple Leporello's plays appear, each one of them is essentially an ingenious and virtuoso form of drama, done for an audience that is addressed on an emotional and intellectual level.
