= Titus De Voogdt =

Belgian actor

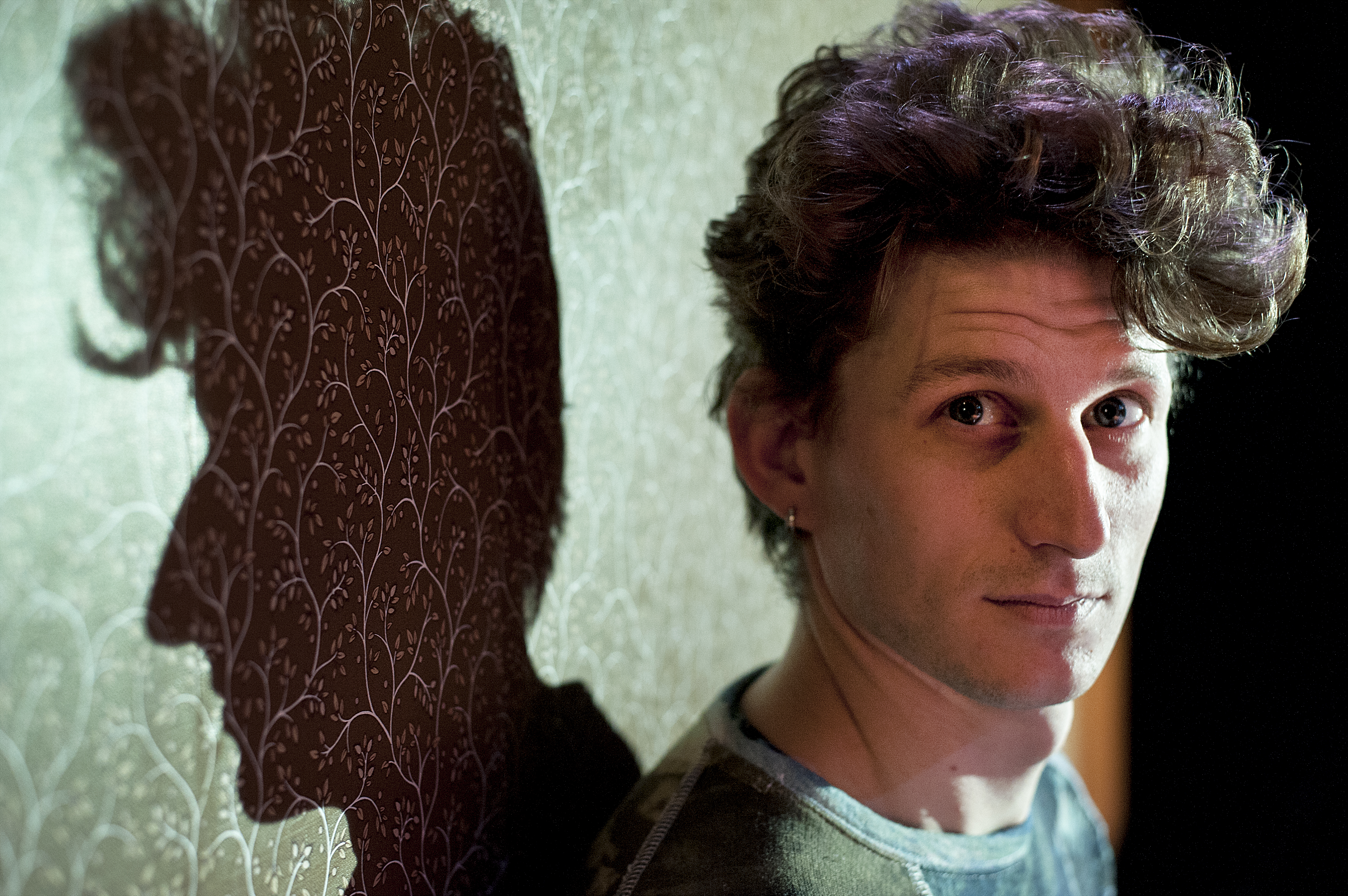
- Born: July 4, 1979 (age 46); Ghent, East Flanders, Belgium

Titus De Voogdt (born July 4, 1979) is a Belgian actor.

== Biography ==
De Voogdt earned a master's degree in sculpture at the Sint-Lucas School of Architecture in Ghent.

He started his acting career in theater and is mainly known for his performances in various plays. One of the first and more recognizable plays include Bernadetje (Victoria), Mijn Blackie (HETPALEIS & Nieuwpoorttheater), Achter de wereld (BRONKS) and Maria eeuwigdurende bijstand / Marie éternelle consolation (Dastheater & Theater Zuidpool). Under Compagnie Cecilia he played in such noteworthy plays as Trouwfeesten en processen, Altijd Prijs and Poepsimpel.

In cinema he has appeared in Any Way the Wind Blows (directed by Tom Barman), as Steve in Steve + Sky (directed by Felix Van Groeningen) in Ben X (directed by Nic Balthazar) and Small Gods (Dimitri Karakatsanis). In 2012 he was featured in Plan B on FOUR where he had his own section.

In 2014 he appeared, as Vincent Bourg, in the BBC One television series The Missing.

== Theater ==
- Chasse Pattate (2017)
- Poepsimpel (2016)
- De geschiedenis van de wereld aan de hand van banaliteiten (2013)
- Duikvlucht (2012)
- Vorst/Forest (2011)
- Altijd prijs (2008)
- Trouwfeesten en processen enzovoorts (2006)
- Maria eeuwigdurende bijstand/Marie éternelle consolation (2005)
- Achter de wereld (2003)
- Mijn Blackie (1999)
- Bernadetje (1996)
- Achter glas (1994)
- De tuin (1994)

== Films ==
- Any Way the Wind Blows (2003) - Felix
- Steve + Sky (2004) - Steve
- Ben X (2007) - Bogaert
- Small Gods (2007) - David
- 22 mei (2010) - Nico Degeest
- Welp (2014) - leider Chris
- Broer (2016) - Ronnie Ovaere
- King of the Belgians (2016) - Carlos
- The Barefoot Emperor (2019)

== Television ==
- The Missing (2014 - BBC1) - Vincent Bourg
- De day (2018 - Play4) - Elias De Sutter
- De twaalf (2019 - één) - Mike
- Mijn slechtste beste vriendin (2021) - Jacobs
- 1985 (2023) - Philippe Debels
