= Marie Vinck =

Belgian actress

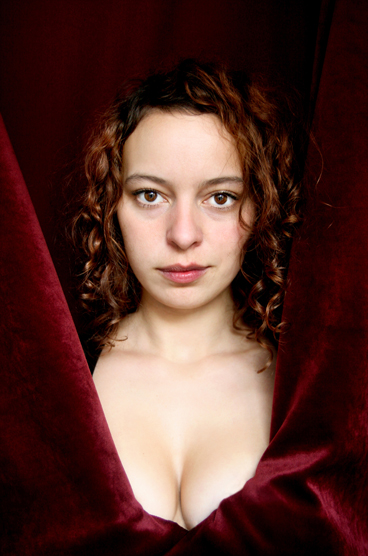
- Born: Antwerp, Belgium
- Occupation: Actress
- Years active: 1993–present

Marie Vinck is a Belgian actress.

== Life ==
Vinck started acting in 1993 at the age of 10 in the Flemish TV series Mother, Why Do We Live?, in which Vinck's mother performed a leading role. In 1998, she acted another role alongside her mother in the Dutch-Flemish movie Dandelion Game.

Vinck has also given the Flemish dubbing voice to Emma Watson's role as Hermione Granger in the Harry Potter films.

== Filmography ==
=== Film ===
- Dandelion Game – Moniek (1998)
- Cheese – Ida Laarmans (1999)
- Saint Amour – Unknown role (2001, TV Movie)
- The Kiss – Sarah Lenaerts (2004)
- Loft – Sarah Delporte (2008)
- The Box Collector – Juile (2008)
- Vox Populi – Peggy 25 jaar (2008)
- SM-rechter – Iris Allegaerts (2009)
- Amsterdam – Hannah (2009)
- Adem – Anneleen (2010)
- Lovesick – Michelle (2010)
- Sprakeloos – Josee 18 jaar, Josee 37 jaar (2017)
- Rituell – Kiki Schelfthaut (2022)

=== TV series ===
- Mother, why do we live? (1993)
- The Kavijaks – Esther 'Belinda' Goldberg (2007)
- Zone Stad – Els Liekens (2008), Stephanie Arco (2012)
- The Taste of the Keyser – Louise Lecron (2008)
- The Rodenburgs – Marie-Claire Rodenburg (2009–2011)
- 13 Commandments – Vicky Degraeve (2018)
- Rough Diamonds - Gila Wolfson (2023-)

== Dubbing roles ==
=== Live-action films ===
- Harry Potter films – Hermione Granger (Emma Watson)

=== Animated films ===
- Toy Story – Hannah Phillips (replacing Sarah Freeman's voice)
