= The Kiss (2004 film) =

2004 Belgian film by Hilde Van Mieghem

- Theatrical release poster
- Directed by: Hilde Van Mieghem
- Written by: Hilde Van Mieghem
- Produced by: Michel Houdmont
- Starring: Marie Vinck; Fedja van Huêt; Jan Decleir
- Cinematography: Jan Vancaillie
- Edited by: Eric DeVos
- Music by: Stef Kamil Carlens; Bert Joris
- Production company: Fonds Film in Vlaanderen
- Distributed by: Kinepolis Film Distribution
- Release date: 17 November 2004
- Running time: 100 minutes
- Country: Belgium
- Language: Dutch

The Kiss (original Dutch title: De kus) is a 2004 Flemish film directed and written by Hilde Van Mieghem.

== Principal cast ==
- Marie Vinck as Sarah Lenaerts
- Veerle Baetens as Rita
- Zakaria Bchiri as little boy
- Marc Bogaerts as ballet teacher
- Leonie Borgs as Celine Lenaerts
- Zoe Cnaepkens as Sarah Lenaerts (young)
- Axel Daeseleire as Detective
- Jan Decleir as Marcel Lenaerts
- Tom De Hoog as doctor
- Josse De Pauw as nonkel Hugo
- Hilde Van Mieghem as Denise Lenaerts

== Trivia ==
- Hilde Van Mieghem and Marie Vinck are mother and daughter.

== Awards and nominations ==
=== Won ===
Joseph Plateau Awards

- Best Actress (Vinck)

Viareggio EuropaCinema

- Best Actress (Vinck)

=== Nominated ===
Emden International Film Festival

- Emden Film Award - 2nd Place (Van Mieghem)

Joseph Plateau Awards

- Best Belgian Composer (Carlens and Joris)
