= Gilles' Wife =

- French theatrical release poster
- Directed by: Frédéric Fonteyne
- Written by: Philippe Blasband; Frédéric Fonteyne; Marion Hänsel
- Produced by: Patrick Quinet; Claude Waringo
- Starring: Emmanuelle Devos; Clovis Cornillac
- Cinematography: Virginie Saint-Martin
- Edited by: Ewin Ryckaert
- Music by: Vincent D'Hondt
- Distributed by: Cinéart (Belgium); Mars Distribution (France)
- Release date: 15 September 2004
- Running time: 103 minutes
- Countries: Belgium; France; Luxembourg
- Language: French

Gilles' Wife (French: La Femme de Gilles) is a 2004 drama film based on the 1937 novel of the same name by Madeleine Bourdouxhe. The film was directed by Frédéric Fonteyne and written by Fonteyne, Philippe Blasband and Marion Hänsel. It received the André Cavens Award for Best Film by the Belgian Film Critics Association (UCC).

== Cast ==
- Emmanuelle Devos as Elisa
- Clovis Cornillac as Gilles
- Laura Smet as Victorine
- Colette Emmanuelle as Elisa's mother
- Gil Lagay as Elisa' father

== Production ==
Filming locations included Longwy and Tucquegnieux, in the Meurthe-et-Moselle department.
