= Rocco Granata =

Italian-Belgian musician (born 1938)

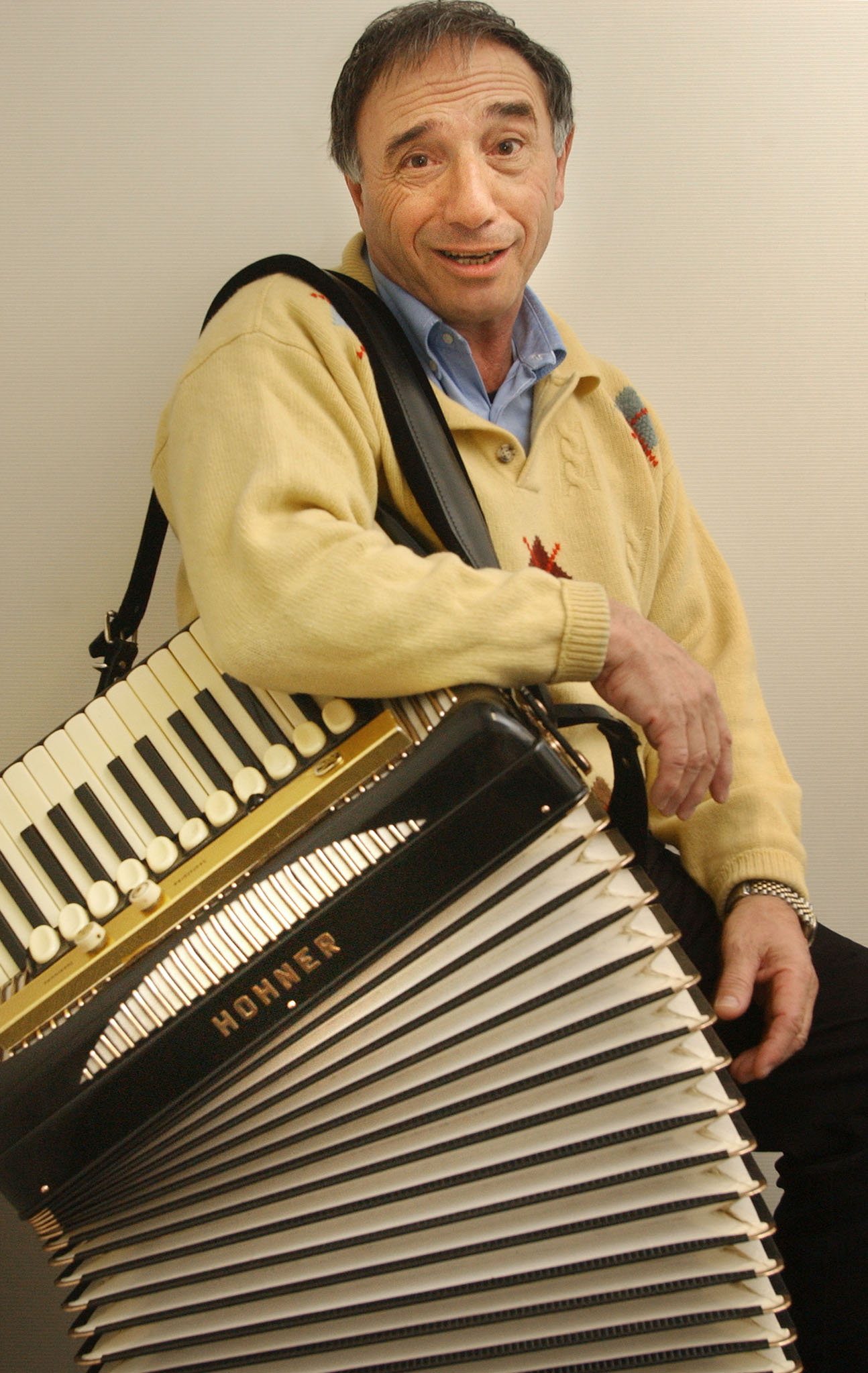
- Born: 16 August 1938 (age 88); Figline Vegliaturo, Calabria, Kingdom of Italy
- Citizenship: Italy; Belgium
- Occupations: Accordionist; singer-songwriter

Rocco Granata (born 16 August 1938) is an Italian-Belgian singer, songwriter, and accordionist.

Granata was born in Figline Vegliaturo, Calabria, southern Italy; but his parents immigrated to Belgium when he was aged ten. Rocco's father was a coal miner, but Granata pursued music instead. He played accordion and toured Belgium with his band, 'The International Quintet'. He then released the songs "Manuela" / "Marina" as a single in 1959; the B-side became an international hit, reaching #1 in Belgium and in Germany as well as charting across Europe and in the United States. It sold over one million copies in Germany alone, and was awarded a gold disc. It has been covered many times by artists such as Willy Alberti, Marino Marini, Ilham al-Madfai, Dalida and Louis Armstrong.

After the success of "Marina", Granata toured the world, including dates at Carnegie Hall. A feature film entitled Marina was released in 1960, which set the stage for a string of German hits. He also appeared in Italy at the Sanremo Festival in 1961.

Granata later became a successful record producer. He owned the record labels Cardinal Records and Granata Records, and has produced Marva, Louis Neefs, Miel Cools, and De Elegasten.

In 1989, Granata commissioned a dance remix of "Marina", which again topped the Belgian charts as well as those of Italy, France and Germany. He has appeared regularly on Belgian television, and served as a jury member for the 2002 Flemish preliminaries for the Eurovision Song Contest. In March 2000 he was awarded the ZAMU Lifetime Achievement Award by the Belgian music industry.

Granata has released some 65 singles over the course of his career.

In 2013 his early life was captured in another movie named Marina.

== Singles ==
- "Marina" (1959) BEL #1, NL #1, US: Billboard #31, / Cashbox: #12, GER #1
- "Oh oh Rossi" (1959) BEL #20, GER #14
- "La Bella" (1960) BEL #4, GER #18
- "Julia"/"Rocco Cha Cha" (1960) BEL #14
- "Germanina" (1960) BEL #16
- "Carolina dai" (1961) BEL #11
- "Irena" (1961) GER #15
- "Sunday Box EP" (1961) BEL #17
- "Buona notte bambino" (1963) BEL #4, GER #5
- "Du schwarzer Zigeuner" (1964) BEL #5
- "Dreh' dich noch einmal um" (1964) BEL #10
- "Molte grazie" (1964) BEL #12
- "Noordzeestrand" (1964) BEL #9
- "Melancholie" (1965) BEL #18
- "Hello buona sera" (1967) BEL #3
- "Sarah" (1970) BEL #4
- "Jessica" (1971) BEL #5
- "Zomersproetjes" (1972) BEL #4
- "Dansen op de daken" (1973) BEL #4
- "Marina 120 BPM" (1989) BEL #1
