= Gust Van Den Berghe =

Belgian film director

Gust Van den Berghe
- Born: 1985 (age 40–41)
- Occupations: Film director, producer

Gust Van den Berghe is a Flemish multidisciplinary artist and film director.

== Biography ==
Gust Van den Berghe was born in Belgium in 1985, he is a son of Kristien Dieltiens. In his early years, he became successful as a breakdancer and performed in theater pieces including the Royal Ballet of Flanders. He studied filmmaking at the School of Audiovisual Art of Brussels and then received a postgraduate degree in Transmedia at SintLukas. In 2006 he filmed his directorial debut – a short Mijn papa en ik, Doek, Aan de oppervlakte, soon followed by documentaries cum*SHOT (2007), les petits Rois (2007) and Tegenpolen (2008). His graduation film at the academy, Petit bébé Jésus de Flandre (Little Baby Jesus of Flandr), was selected for numerous film festivals around the world, including the prestigious Directors' Fortnight at Cannes 2010. The film brought Van den Berghe the Jo Ropcke Award at the Ghent International Film Festival as well as the Best Director Award at the Athene Film Festival.

His second feature Blue Bird was released in 2011. The movie won the European Film Academy Young Audience Award and was screened at many international festivals. In 2014, Van den Berghe released the third part of the trilogy, Lucifer. Critically acclaimed, it won the Grand Prix at the 15th T-Mobile New Horizons International Film Festival in Wrocław.

His next feature, the Magnet Man, premiered at the Tallinn Black Nights Film Festival in 2023. Critically acclaimed, it won Special Mention Jury Award at the 31st Palić European Film Festival.

As of 2024, Van den Berghe worked as a co-curator for the Museum M in Leuven. He is also active as a teacher and artistic researcher at the KASK School or Arts in Ghent.

== Filmography ==
- 2010 – Little Baby Jesus of Flandr;
- 2011 – Blue Bird;
- 2014 – Lucifer;
- 2023 – The Magnet Man.
