= Frédéric Fonteyne =

Belgian film director

- Born: 9 January 1968 (age 58); Uccle, Brussels-Capital Region, Belgium
- Occupation: film director

Frédéric Fonteyne (French pronunciation: [fʁedeʁik fɔ̃tɛn]; born 9 January 1968) is a Belgian film director. He studied film at the Institut des arts de diffusion in Louvain-la-Neuve. His 2020 film Working Girls was selected as the Belgian entry for the Best International Feature Film at the 93rd Academy Awards.

== Filmography ==
- Short Films
  - 1998 Bon anniversaire Sergent Bob (written by Philippe Blasband)
  - 1989 Les Vloems (written by Philippe Blasband)
  - 1991 La Modestie (written by Philippe Blasband)
  - 1993 Bob le déplorable (written by Philippe Blasband)
- Feature Films
  - 1997 Max et Bobo (written by Philippe Blasband)
  - 1999 Une liaison pornographique (written by Philippe Blasband and starring Nathalie Baye and Sergi López)
  - 2004 La Femme de Gilles
  - 2012 Tango libre
  - 2020 Working Girls
