= List of works by Jaco Van Dormael =

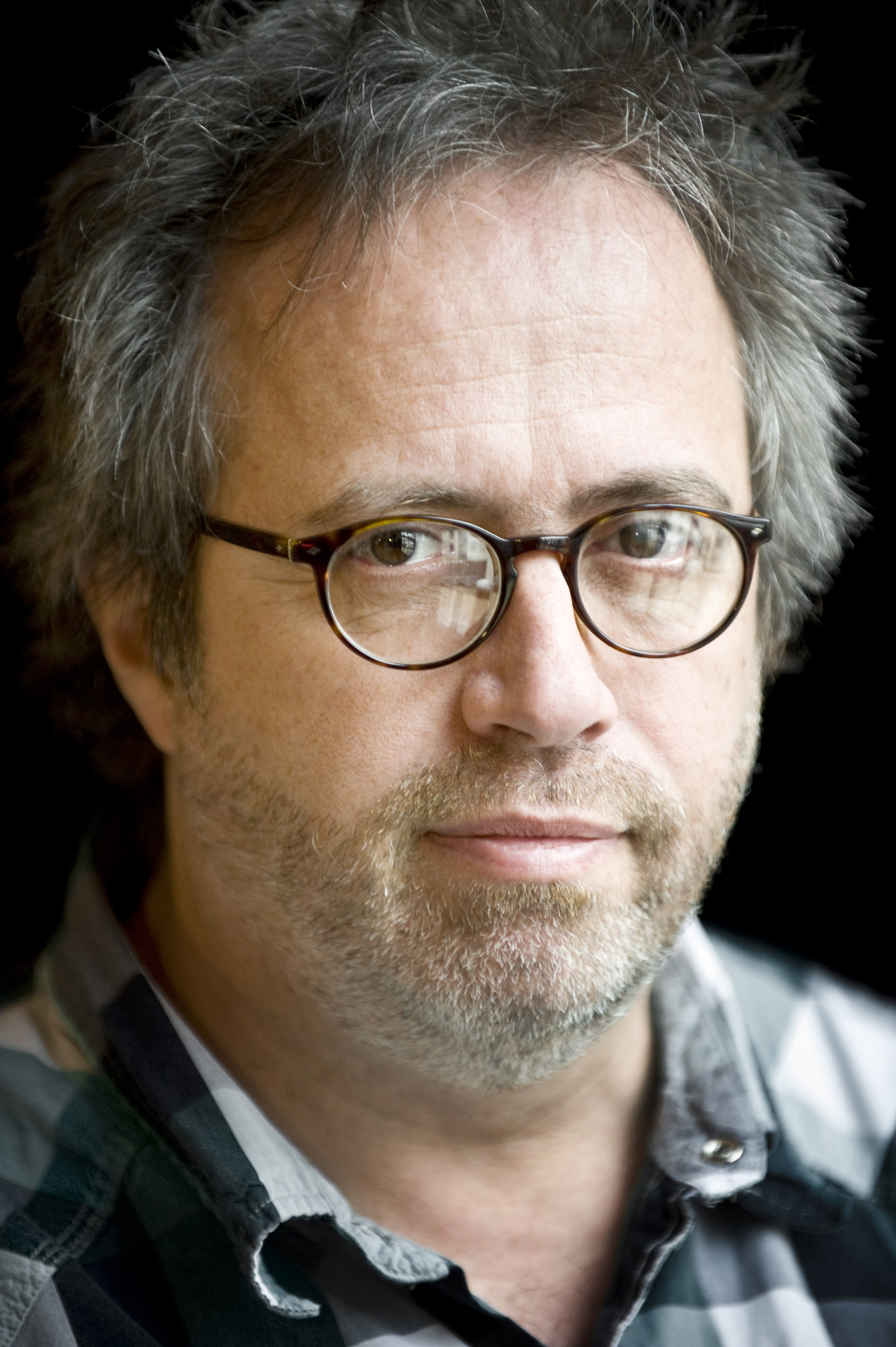
Van Dormael in 2011

Jaco Van Dormael is a Belgian film director, screenwriter and playwright whose work spans cinema, theatre and other forms of visual storytelling. His accolades include four Magritte Awards, three Joseph Plateau Awards, two European Film Awards, a César Award, and a Caméra d'Or.

He has directed four feature films, including Toto the Hero (1991), The Eighth Day (1996), Mr. Nobody (2009) and The Brand New Testament (2015), and has also worked extensively in theatre in collaboration with his long-time partner and choreographer Michèle Anne De Mey, notably on productions such as Kiss & Cry (2011), Cold Blood (2016) and Amor (2017).

In addition to his film and stage work, he has contributed to other media, including comics, co-writing the Blake and Mortimer album The Last Pharaoh (2019).

== Filmography ==
=== Feature films ===
Year	Film	Credited as			Notes
Year	Film	Director	Writer	Producer	Notes
1991	Toto the Hero	Yes	Yes		
1992	Between Heaven and Earth		Story		
1996	The Eighth Day	Yes	Yes		
2007	Hidden Face			Yes	
2009	Mr. Nobody	Yes	Yes	Yes	Co-producer
2014	Nicholas on Holiday		Yes		Collaborating writer
2015	The Brand New Testament	Yes	Yes	Yes	

=== Short films ===
- Maedeli the Breach (1980)
- Stade 81 (1981)
- Les Voisins (1981)
- L'imitateur (1982)
- Sortie de secours (1983)
- È pericoloso sporgersi (1984)
- De boot (1985)
- The Kiss (1995)
- Eole (2010)
- The Shape (2019)
- On the Wings of Hermès (2023)

== Music videos ==
- "La Ceinture", Élodie Frégé (2006)
- "Ladyboy", Indochine (2007)
- "Oostende Bonsoir", Arno (2019)

== Theatre ==
- Couldn't We Love Each Other a Little? (Est-ce qu'on ne pourrait pas s'aimer un peu ?, 2000), Théâtre des Riches-Claires, Brussels
- Kiss & Cry (2011), Le Manège de Mons, Mons; co-created with Michèle Anne De Mey
- Stradella (2012), Opéra Royal de Wallonie, Liège
- Cold Blood (2015), Théâtre de Namur, Namur; co-created with Michèle Anne De Mey
- Don Giovanni (2016), Opéra Royal de Wallonie, Liège
- Amor (2017), Théâtre National, Brussels; co-created with Michèle Anne De Mey
- La sonnambula (2020), Opéra Royal de Wallonie, Liège
- Bovary (2021), Royal Flemish Theatre, Brussels

== Graphic novels ==
- The Last Pharaoh (2019) – written by Jaco Van Dormael, Thomas Gunzig and François Schuiten; illustrated by François Schuiten
