= List of Belgian films of the 1980s =

A list of films produced in Belgium ordered by year of release. For an alphabetical list of Belgian films see Category:Belgian films

Title	Director	Cast	Genre	Notes
1980
Le chaînon manquant (The Missing Link)	Picha		Animation	Entered into the 1980 Cannes Film Festival
Maedeli la brèche	Jaco Van Dormael		Short	Student Academy Honorary Award for Best Foreign Film
1981
Le Grand Paysage d'Alexis Droeven	Jean-Jacques Andrien			Entered into the 31st Berlin International Film Festival
Stade 81	Jaco Van Dormael		Short	
Vrijdag	Hugo Claus			Entered into the 31st Berlin International Film Festival
1982
Het beest	Paul Collet	Willem Ruis, Bert André, Harry Kümel	Drama	Belgian-Dutch co-production
L'imitateur	Jaco Van Dormael		Short	
1983
Brussels by Night	Marc Didden	François Beukelaers, Daniel van Avermaet, Ingrid De Vos, Josse De Pauw	Drama	Belgian-Dutch co-production
Sortie de secours	Jaco Van Dormael		Short	
Winter 1960	Thierry Michel			Entered into the 13th Moscow International Film Festival
1984
È pericoloso sporgersi	Jaco Van Dormael		Short	
Jan zonder vrees (The Heroic Adventures of John the Fearless)	Jef Cassiers	Jan Decleir	Animation	First feature-length animated film entirely produced in Flanders
1985
De boot	Jaco Van Dormael		Short	
Springen (Jumping)	Jean-Pierre De Decker	Herbert Flack, Robbe De Hert, Ingrid De Vos		
1986
Het Gezin van Paemel (The van Paemel Family)	Paul Cammermans	Frank Aendenboom, Jan Decleir	Drama	Entered into the 15th Moscow International Film Festival
1987
Le Big-Bang (The Big Bang)	Picha		Animation	
Crazy Love	Dominique Deruddere	Josse De Pauw, Michael Pas	Drama	First Flemish film theatrically released in North America; based on the novels of Charles Bukowski
Der Fall Boran	Daniel Zuta	Bernard Rud, Renée Soutendijk, Jean-Pierre Léaud	Crime	Belgian-West German co-production
1988
Le maître de musique (The Music Teacher)	Gérard Corbiau		Drama	Academy Award for Best Foreign Language Film nominee
L'Œuvre au noir (The Abyss)	André Delvaux			Entered into the 1988 Cannes Film Festival
1989
American Stories, Food, Family and Philosophy	Chantal Akerman			Entered into the 39th Berlin International Film Festival
Blueberry Hill: A Love Story from the Fifties	Robbe De Hert	Michael Pas, Babette van Veen, Hilde Heijnen, Frank Aendenboom, Ronny Coutteure, Frank Dingenen, Stijn Meuris	Comedy-drama	Followed by Brylcream Boulevard
Marquis	Henri Xhonneux	François Marthouret, Valérie Kling		
