= List of accolades received by Mr. Nobody =

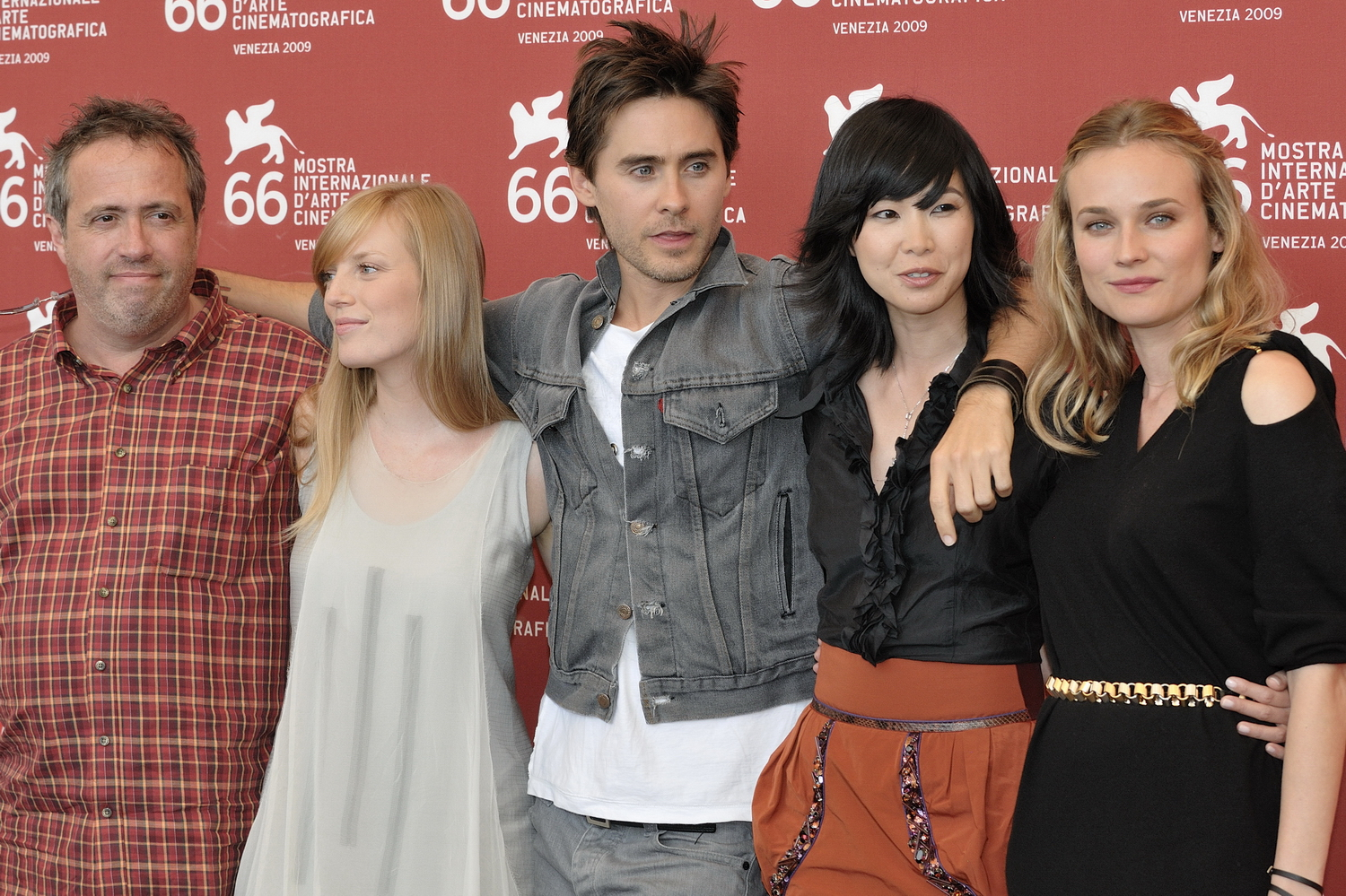
- Director Jaco Van Dormael along with actors Sarah Polley, Jared Leto, Linh Dan Pham, and Diane Kruger at the 2009 Venice Film Festival
Awards & nominations
Award	Won	Nominated
American Film Institute	1	1
ARRI/OSRAM Award	0	1
Belgian Film Critics Association	1	1
Biografilm Festival	1	1
Brussels Film Critics Circle	1	1
Bucheon Film Critics Association	1	2
Crystal Globe Awards	0	2
Cutting Edge Awards	1	1
European Film Awards	1	1
Fonske Awards	1	1
Golden Camera Awards	1	2
Golden Goblet Awards	0	1
Golden Tulip Awards	0	1
International Federation of Film Critics	0	1
Magritte Awards	6	7
Méliès d'Argent	0	1
National Norwegian Design Awards	0	1
Russian National Movie Awards	0	2
Silverback Awards	2	3
Sitges Film Festival	1	2
Stockholm Film Festival	1	2
Toronto International Film Festival	0	1
Trieste Science Fiction Festival	0	1
Venice Film Festival	2	5
Wolf PÖFF Awards	1	1
- Total number of wins and nominations
Totals	22	43
- References

Mr. Nobody is a 2009 science fiction drama film written and directed by Jaco Van Dormael. Through the use of nonlinear narrative and the multiverse hypothesis style, the film tells the life story of Nemo Nobody, a 118-year-old man who is the last mortal on Earth after the human race has achieved quasi-immortality. It stars Jared Leto, Sarah Polley, Diane Kruger, and Linh Dan Pham, with Rhys Ifans, Natasha Little, Toby Regbo, and Juno Temple in supporting roles.

Mr. Nobody was released to generally positive reviews from critics, who praised its nonlinear structure and motifs of human emotion, choice, time, and nature. Despite a strong performance in its domestic market, the film was a box office disappointment, failing to make back its production costs. It later found commercial success on home video and streaming services, establishing Mr. Nobody as a cult classic. The film received awards and nominations in a variety of categories, with particular praise given to its direction, screenplay, cinematography and performances. It earned the André Cavens Award for Best Film given by the Belgian Film Critics Association.

At the Venice International Film Festival, the film was submitted for consideration for the Golden Lion, but lost to Lebanon (2009). Sylvie Olivé was later awarded Outstanding Technical Contribution, while Jared Leto was listed as the runner-up for Best Actor. At the 2011 Magritte Awards, Mr. Nobody received a leading seven nominations and won six: Best Film, Best Director, Best Screenplay, Best Cinematography, Best Original Score, and Best Editing. It held the record for the most Magritte Awards won by a single film, before being beaten by Mothers' Instinct (2018) with nine. The film also received a European Film Award, Fonske Award, Golden Camera Award, and two Silverback Awards. The Brussels Film Critics Circle named Mr. Nobody one of the top ten films of the year.

== Awards and nominations ==
Award	Date	Category	Recipient(s)	Result	Ref(s)
American Film Institute	23 November 2010	Top European Films	Mr. Nobody	Won	
ARRI/OSRAM Award	3 July 2010	Best Foreign Film	Mr. Nobody	Nominated	
Belgian Film Critics Association	27 December 2010	Best Film	Jaco Van Dormael	Won	
Biografilm Festival	14 June 2010	Audience Award	Mr. Nobody	Won	
Brussels Film Critics Circle	19 December 2010	Top Ten Films	Mr. Nobody	Won	
Bucheon Film Critics Association	25 July 2010	Best Film	Mr. Nobody	Nominated	
Bucheon Film Critics Association	25 July 2010	Best Actor	Jared Leto	Won	
Crystal Globe Awards	10 July 2010	Best Film	Mr. Nobody	Nominated	
Crystal Globe Awards	10 July 2010	Audience Award	Mr. Nobody	Nominated	
Cutting Edge Awards	21 January 2011	Best Film	Mr. Nobody	Won	
European Film Awards	4 December 2010	People's Choice Award for Best European Film	Mr. Nobody	Won	
Fonske Awards	11 September 2010	Best Film	Mr. Nobody	Won	
Golden Camera Awards	22 October 2010	Best Cinematography	Christophe Beaucarne	Nominated	
Golden Camera Awards	22 October 2010	Outstanding Technical Contribution	Christophe Beaucarne	Won	
Golden Goblet Awards	20 June 2010	Best Feature Film	Mr. Nobody	Nominated	
Golden Tulip Award	18 April 2010	Best International Film	Mr. Nobody	Nominated	
International Federation of Film Critics	12 September 2009	Best Film	Mr. Nobody	Nominated	
Magritte Awards	5 February 2011	Best Film	Mr. Nobody	Won	
Magritte Awards	5 February 2011	Best Director	Jaco Van Dormael	Won	
Magritte Awards	5 February 2011	Best Screenplay	Jaco Van Dormael	Won	
Magritte Awards	5 February 2011	Best Cinematography	Christophe Beaucarne	Won	
Magritte Awards	5 February 2011	Best Editing	Matyas Veress	Won	
Magritte Awards	5 February 2011	Best Original Score	Pierre Van Dormael	Won	
Magritte Awards	5 February 2011	Best Sound	Emmanuel de Boissieu, Frédéric Demolder, Dominique Warnier	Nominated	
Méliès d'Argent	14 November 2010	Best European Fantastic Feature Film	Mr. Nobody	Nominated	
National Norwegian Design Awards	26 May 2008	Best Poster	Kåre Martens	Nominated	
Russian National Movie Awards	10 April 2011	Best Foreign Film – Drama	Mr. Nobody	Nominated	
Russian National Movie Awards	10 April 2011	Best Actor – International	Jared Leto	Nominated	
Silverback Awards	27 July 2012	Best Foreign Film	Mr. Nobody	Won	
Silverback Awards	27 July 2012	Best Director	Jaco Van Dormael	Won	
Silverback Awards	27 July 2012	Audience Award	Mr. Nobody	Nominated	
Sitges Film Festival	12 October 2009	Best Film	Mr. Nobody	Nominated	
Sitges Film Festival	12 October 2009	Best Makeup	Kaatje Van Damme	Won	
Stockholm Film Festival	29 November 2009	Best Film	Mr. Nobody	Nominated	
Stockholm Film Festival	29 November 2009	Best Cinematography	Christophe Beaucarne	Won	
Toronto International Film Festival	19 September 2009	People's Choice Award	Mr. Nobody	Nominated	
Trieste Science Fiction Festival	14 November 2010	Best Film	Mr. Nobody	Nominated	
Venice Film Festival	12 September 2009	Golden Lion	Mr. Nobody	Nominated	
Venice Film Festival	12 September 2009	Special Jury Prize	Mr. Nobody	Nominated	
Venice Film Festival	12 September 2009	Best Actor	Jared Leto	Runner-up	
Venice Film Festival	12 September 2009	Outstanding Technical Contribution	Sylvie Olivé	Won	
Venice Film Festival	12 September 2009	Biografilm Lancia Award – Fiction	Mr. Nobody	Won	
Wolf PÖFF Awards	5 December 2010	Top International Films	Mr. Nobody	Won	

== See also ==
- 2010 in film
- Cinema of Belgium
