= Van Dormael =

Van Dormael is a surname. Notable people with the surname include:

- Jaco Van Dormael (born 1957), Belgian film director, screenwriter, and playwright
- Juliette Van Dormael (born 1990), Belgian cinematographer
- Pierre Van Dormael (1952–2008), Belgian jazz guitarist and composer
