= Selma Alaoui =

French actress (born 1980)

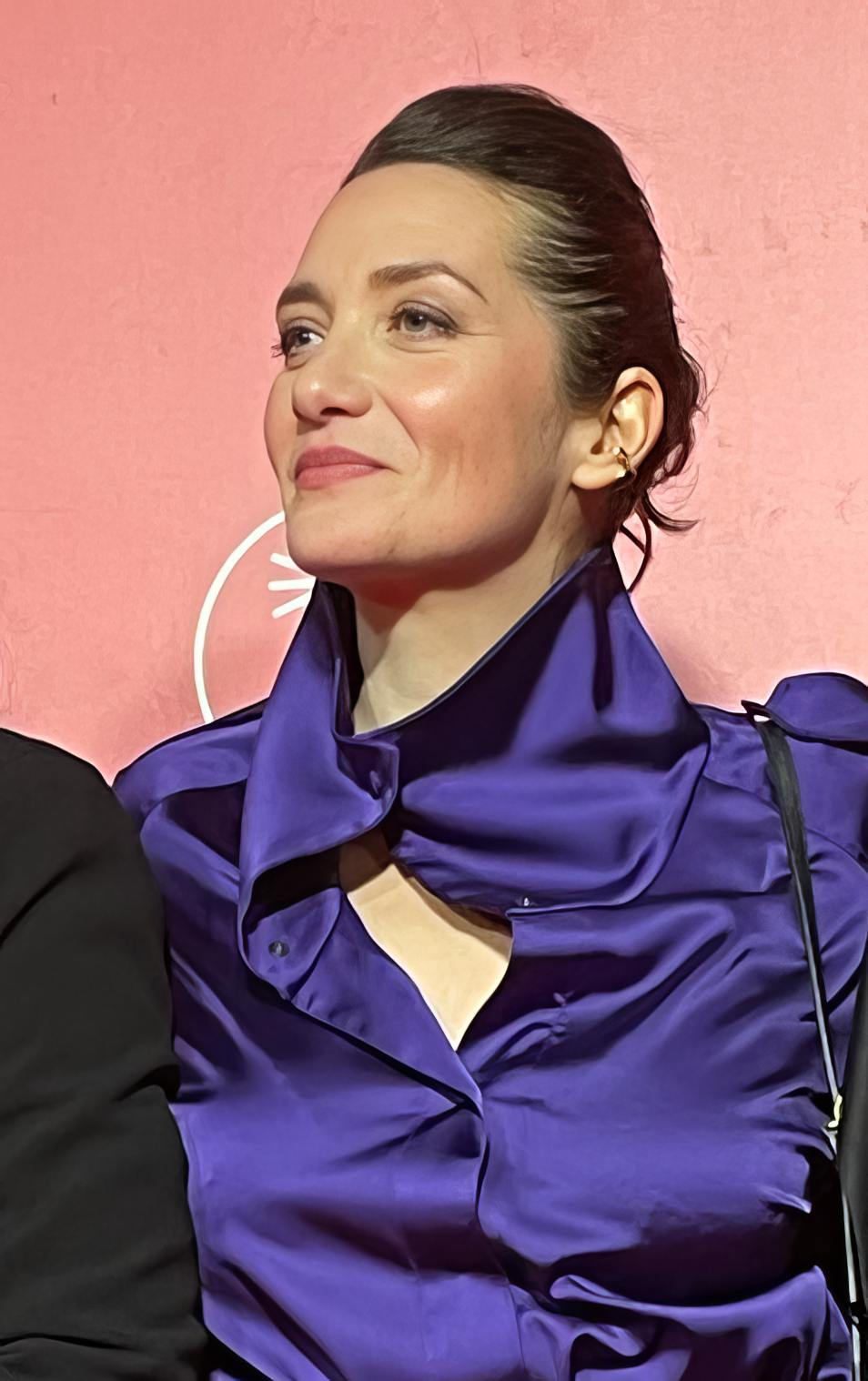
- Born: 20 September 1980 (age 45); Rabat, Morocco
- Occupations: Actress; theatre director; playwright; lecturer
- Years active: 2006–present

Selma Alaoui (born 20 September 1980) is a French actress, theatre director and playwright, based in Brussels, Belgium. She made her film acting debut as the leading role in Academy Award-nominated short film A Sister (2018).

== Early life ==
Selma Alaoui was born on 20 September 1980 in Rabat, Morocco, to a French mother of Polish origin and a Moroccan father. After studying literature in Lille, she trained in acting and directing at Institut national supérieur des arts du spectacle et des techniques de diffusion in Brussels.

== Career ==
In 2007, she co-founded theatre collective, Mariedl, with Emilie Maquest and Coline Struyf. The collective disbanded in 2023.

Alongside her theatrical career, she starred as the leading role of Delphine Girard's short film A Sister in 2018. The short film was nominated for Best Live Action Short Film at the 92nd Academy Awards. She also starred in 2023 film Through the Night, the feature-length adaptation of the short film. For her performance, she received a nomination for the Best Actress at the 14th Magritte Awards.

As a lecturer, she has taught at the INSAS, Institut des arts de diffusion, and Conservatoire royal de Mons.

== Work ==
=== Theatre ===
Year	Title	Role	Notes
2006	La marea		
2006–2007	Blanche-neige		
2007–2009	Anticlimax	—N/a	As director
2008–2010	Hansel and Gretel		
2010–2012	Ivanov Re/mix		
2010–2011	I Would Prefer Not To	—N/a	As director and playwright
2010–2011	Projet Lulu		
2011–2012	Grisélidis		
2013	L'amour la guerre	—N/a	As director and playwright
2013	La peur		
2013	Chiennes		
2014	Mange ta glace		
2014	Still Too Sad Too Tell You		
2014	Homme sans but		
2015	Notes pour le futur	—N/a	As director
2016	Apocalypse Bebe	—N/a	As director
2016	Apres la peur		
2018	Ce qui arrive		
2019	Linda vista		
2020	Sciences-fictions		Also as director and playwright
2021	Femme disparait	—N/a	As director and playwright
2024	Au bord	—N/a	As director and playwright

=== Film ===
Year	Title	Role	Notes
2010	Vampires	Elisabeth	
2010	Walking Ghost Phase	Gwen	Short film
2011	The Kid with a Bike	Nadine	
2017	The Most Assassinated Woman in the World		
2018	A Sister	Alie	Short film
2023	Through the Night	Aly	Nominated—Magritte Award for Best Actress
2024	Samia	Samia	Also as director and writer

=== Television ===
Year	Title	Role	Notes
2016	Amnêsia	Pauline	
2017–2018	Unit 42	Dianne Wauters	
2023	Alter Ego	Chief of police	
