= È pericoloso sporgersi =

È pericoloso sporgersi may refer to:

- È pericoloso sporgersi (1984 film), a 1984 Belgian short film written and directed by Jaco Van Dormael
- È pericoloso sporgersi (1993 film), a 1993 Romanian film directed by Nae Caranfil
