= Starting block =

Starting block may refer to:

in sports:

- Starting block in track cycling, the object which holds the bicycle at the starting line until the starting signal
- Starting blocks in track and field, an apparatus that braces a runner's feet at the start of a race
- Starting block in Swimming (sport), a raised platform mounted at the end of a pool from which swimmers begin a race

in film:

- Stade 81 (Starting Blocks), a 1981 short documentary film directed by Jaco Van Dormael
