= Be Film Festival =

The Be Film Festival (BeFF) is an annual film festival held in Brussels, Belgium. It was founded in 2005 and has been held every year in December. It was launched as a showcase for all kind of works of Belgian cinema. The festival includes a retrospective of films that were released during the year as well as a series of premieres and other special screenings.

Since its foundation, it has played host to Bouli Lanners, Natacha Régnier, Jaco Van Dormael, Koen De Graeve, Marion Hänsel, Fien Troch, François Damiens, Benoît Mariage, Jan Verheyen, Joachim Lafosse, Michaël R. Roskam, among others.
