= Susana Rossberg =

Brazilian-born Belgian film editor and director (1945–2025)

- Born: 22 September 1945; São Paulo, Brazil
- Died: 11 December 2025 (aged 80); Brussels, Belgium
- Education: Institut national supérieur des arts du spectacle et des techniques de diffusion
- Occupations: Film editor and director

Susana Rossberg (22 September 1945 – 11 December 2025) was a Brazilian-born Belgian film editor and director.

== Life and career ==
Born in São Paulo on 22 September 1945, Rossberg left Brazil during the military dictatorship in 1967. From 1967 to 1970, she studied at the Institut national supérieur des arts du spectacle et des techniques de diffusion in Brussels. In 1972, she was the sound editor for Home Sweet Home, directed by Benoît Lamy. Other notable edits of hers included High Street, Toto the Hero, and The Eighth Day. She was also a scipt supervisor for films such as Golden Eighties and The Abyss. According to Frédéric Sojcher, she was "one of the most renowned film editors in Belgium, both in the French-speaking and Flemish-speaking regions".

Susana Rossberg died of pancreatic cancer on 11 December 2025 at the age of 80.

== Distinction ==
- Knight of the Order of Leopold II (1995)
