= Delphine Girard =

Belgian film director

Delphine Girard is a Belgian film director. She is most noted for her 2018 short film A Sister (Une sœur), which was an Academy Award nominee for Best Live Action Short Film at the 92nd Academy Awards in 2020.

Born in Quebec, she moved to Belgium with her family in childhood, and studied film at INSAS. She directed the short films Monstre (2014) and Caverne (2017) prior to making A Sister.

Her feature debut, Through the Night (Quitter la nuit), premiered at the 80th Venice International Film Festival, where Girard won the Audience Award for the Giornate degli Autori program.
