= Through the Night (2023 film) =

2023 drama film

- Film poster
- French: Quitter la nuit
- Directed by: Delphine Girard
- Written by: Delphine Girard
- Produced by: Jacques-Henri Bronckart
- Starring: Selma Alaoui; Guillaume Duhesme; Veerle Baetens
- Cinematography: Juliette Van Dormael
- Edited by: Damien Keyeux
- Music by: Sébastien Monnoye
- Production companies: Versus Production; Colonelle Films; Haut et Court; The Reunion
- Distributed by: O'Brother Distribution; Haut et Court; Entract Films
- Release date: September 5, 2023 (Venice)
- Running time: 108 minutes
- Countries: Belgium; France; Canada
- Language: French

Through the Night (French: Quitter la nuit) is a 2023 drama film, written and directed by Delphine Girard. A coproduction of companies from Belgium, France and Canada, the film is an expansion of her 2018 short film A Sister (Une sœur), centring on Aly (Selma Alaoui) as she navigates the aftermath of being sexually assaulted by Dary (Guillaume Duhesme).

The cast also includes Veerle Baetens as Anna, the emergency responder who first responded to Aly's call for help, as well as Anne Dorval, Adèle Wismes, Gringe, Florence Janas, Astrid Whettnall and Sabrina Lopez Leonard in supporting roles.

The film premiered in the Giornate degli Autori program at the 80th Venice International Film Festival.

== Reception ==
On the review aggregator website Rotten Tomatoes, 90% of 10 critics' reviews are positive, with an average rating of 8/10.

=== Awards ===
Award	Date of ceremony	Category	Recipient(s)	Result	Ref(s)
Canadian Screen Awards	May 2024	Best Original Screenplay	Delphine Girard	Nominated	
Canadian Screen Awards	May 2024	John Dunning Best First Feature Award		Nominated	
Magritte Awards	22 February 2025	Best Film		Nominated	
Magritte Awards	22 February 2025	Best Director	Delphine Girard	Nominated	
Magritte Awards	22 February 2025	Best Screenplay	Delphine Girard	Nominated	
Magritte Awards	22 February 2025	Best Actress	Selma Alaoui	Nominated	
Magritte Awards	22 February 2025	Best Actress	Veerle Baetens	Nominated	
Magritte Awards	22 February 2025	Best First Feature Film		Nominated	
Magritte Awards	22 February 2025	Best Cinematography	Juliette Van Dormael	Nominated	
Magritte Awards	22 February 2025	Best Production Design	Eve Martin	Nominated	
Magritte Awards	22 February 2025	Best Editing	Damien Keyeux	Nominated	
Venice International Film Festival	September 9, 2023	Giornate degli Autori, Audience Award		Won	
