= Maedeli la brèche =

- Directed by: Jaco Van Dormael
- Cinematography: Hugo Kovensky
- Edited by: Véronique Saenz
- Music by: Pierre Van Dormael
- Release date: 1980
- Running time: 18 minutes
- Country: Belgium
- Languages: Swedish; French

Maedeli la brèche is a 1980 Belgian short film written and directed by Jaco Van Dormael. The film starred Nico d'Oreye, Julie Dubart, Colette Forton, Marie-José Mgank and Jean-François Dufranne.

== Production ==
The short film was shot in 1980 in Belgium with a Super 35 camera. The original music score was written by Pierre Van Dormael, Jaco's brother. Van Dormael wrote the film while he was a student at the INSAS in Brussels.

== Response ==
On June 7, 1981, Maedeli la brèche won the Honorary Foreign Film Award at the 8th Student Academy Awards presented by the Academy of Motion Picture Arts and Sciences. It was awarded the Best Screenplay and the Best Short Film at the 1981 Festival de Bruxelles. It also received the Channel 4 Award at the 1983 Munich Film Festival. In 2011, it appeared at the Sottodiciotto Filmfestival held in Turin in the retrospective dedicated to Van Dormael.
