= A Sister =

2018 short film

- Film poster
- Directed by: Delphine Girard
- Written by: Delphine Girard
- Produced by: Jacques-Henri Bronckart
- Starring: Veerle Baetens; Selma Alaoui; Guillaume Duhesme
- Cinematography: Juliette Van Dormael
- Edited by: Damien Keyeux
- Music by: Sébastien Monnoye
- Production company: Versus Production
- Distributed by: The Animation Showcase
- Release date: 1 October 2018
- Running time: 16 minutes
- Country: Belgium
- Language: French

A Sister (French: Une soeur) is a 2018 Belgian short film written and directed by Delphine Girard. It has been selected and awarded at several film festivals including Rhode Island International Film Festival in August 2019 where it won the Oscar Qualifying Best Short Film Award. The film was also nominated at the 9th Magritte Awards ceremony in February 2019 in Best Live Action Short Film category.

In January 2020, it was nominated for the 2020 Academy Award for Best Live Action Short Film.

Girard's 2023 feature film debut, Through the Night (Quitter la nuit), was an expansion of the story.

== Plot ==
A night. A car. Alie is in danger. To get by, she must make the most important phone call of her life.

== Awards ==
Since its launch, the film has been selected in many festivals around the world and has received several awards.

Year	Presenter/Festival	Award/Category	Status
2018	Festival International du Film Francophone de Namur	Best Short Film; Audience Award; BeTV Award; University of Namur Award	Won
2019	9th Magritte Awards	Best Short Film	Nominated
2019	Saguenay International Short Film Festival	Jury Award	Won
2019	Palm Springs International Film Festival	Best Short Film ?	Nominated
2019	Rhode Island International Film Festival	Best Short Film	Won
2019	Encounters Short Film and Animation Festival	International Competition	Nominated
2019	Brussels Short Film Festival	Best Short	Nominated
2020	Academy Awards	Best Live Action Short Film	Nominated
