= Pascal Duquenne =

Belgian actor (born 1970)

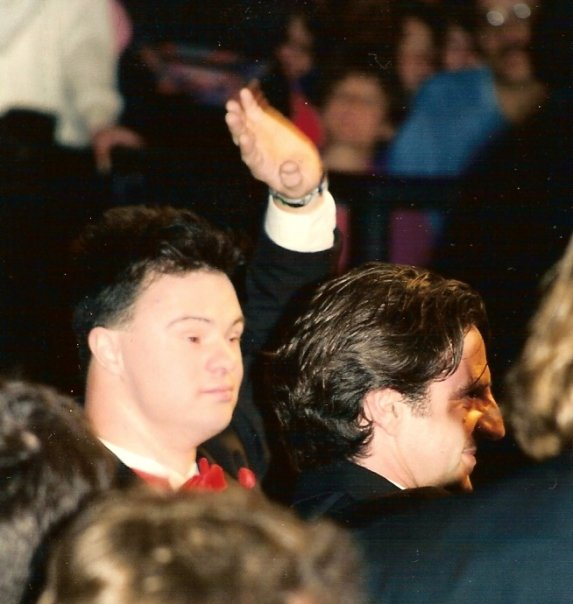
- Pascal Duquenne, on the left, c.1996
- Born: 8 August 1970 (age 55); Vilvoorde, Flanders, Belgium
- Years active: 1991–present
- Awards: Best Actor Award (Cannes Film Festival); 1996 The Eighth Day; Joseph Plateau Award for Best Actor; 1996 The Eighth Day
- Honours: Order of the Crown; Bronze Zinneke

Pascal Duquenne (born 8 August 1970) is a Belgian actor. He shared the Best Actor Award in the 1996 Cannes Film Festival for his performance as Georges in the movie The Eighth Day, with Daniel Auteuil, who played Harry. He lives in Brussels. He has Down syndrome. In 2004, he received the very high civil distinction of Commander in the Order of the Crown (Belgium).

== Films ==
- Toto le héros, 1991 (minor part)
- Le Huitième Jour (The Eighth Day), 1996 (lead role)
- Lumière et compagnie, 1996 (supporting role)
- The Room by Giles Daoust, 2006 (lead role)
- Mr. Nobody, 2009 (supporting role)
- The Brand New Testament, 2015 (supporting role)

All these movies are directed by Jaco Van Dormael.

== TV series ==
- Le commissaire Moulin, 2004
