= The Eighth Day (1996 film) =

1996 Franco-Belgian film

Le huitième jour
- Theatrical release poster
- Directed by: Jaco Van Dormael
- Written by: Jaco Van Dormael
- Produced by: Philippe Godeau; Dominique Josset; Eric Rommeluere
- Starring: Daniel Auteuil; Pascal Duquenne; Miou-Miou; Henri Garcin; Isabelle Sadoyan
- Cinematography: Walther van den Ende
- Edited by: Susana Rossberg
- Music by: Pierre Van Dormael
- Production companies: PolyGram Filmed Entertainment; Working Title Films; Pan-Européenne
- Distributed by: PolyGram Film Distribution
- Release dates: May 1996 (Cannes); 16 May 1996 (France)
- Running time: 118 minutes
- Countries: Belgium; France
- Language: French
- Box office: $37.1 million

The Eighth Day (French: Le huitième jour) is a 1996 Franco-Belgian comedy-drama film that tells the story of the friendship that develops between two men who meet by chance. Harry (Daniel Auteuil), a divorced businessman who feels alienated from his children, meets Georges (Pascal Duquenne), an institutionalised man with Down syndrome, after Georges has escaped from his mental institution and is nearly run over by Harry. The film was selected as the Belgian entry for the Best Foreign Language Film at the 69th Academy Awards, but was not accepted as a nominee.

The film was written and directed by Jaco Van Dormael. Some scenes in the film appear as dream sequences, often employing magical realism. The music of Luis Mariano ("Mexico" and "Maman, Tu Es La Plus Belle Du Monde") is used in these scenes, with actor Laszlo Harmati playing Mariano, who died in 1970. The original music score is from Pierre Van Dormael, Jaco's brother.

== Cast ==
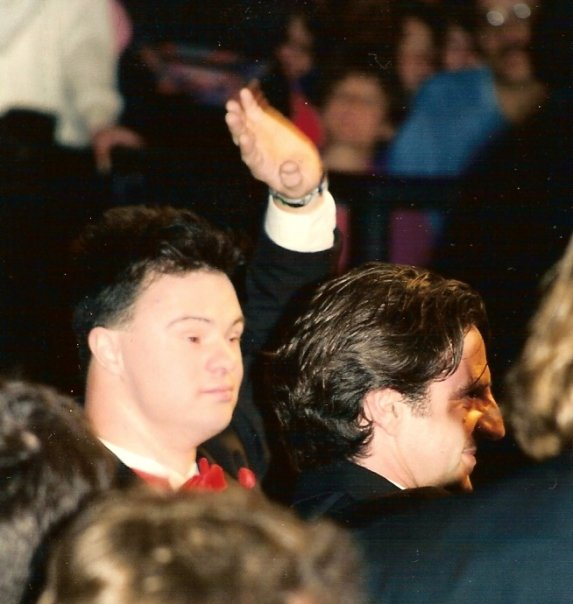
Pascal Duquenne and Daniel Auteuil at the 1996 Cannes Film Festival premiere.

- Daniel Auteuil as Harry
- Pascal Duquenne as Georges
- Miou-Miou as Julie
- Henri Garcin as The director of the bank
- Isabelle Sadoyan as Georges' Mother
- Michele Maes as Nathalie
- Fabienne Loriaux as Fabienne
- Hélène Roussel as Julie's mother
- Alice van Dormael as Alice
- Juliette Van Dormael as Juliette
- Didier De Neck as Fabienne's husband
- Marie-Pierre Meinzel
- Sabrina Leurquin as Waitress in fast food restaurant
- Laszlo Harmati as Luis Mariano

== Reception ==
=== Box office ===
The film grossed $24.3 million in France and $37.1 million worldwide.

=== Critical response ===
On the review aggregator website Rotten Tomatoes, 67% of six critics' reviews are positive.

Roger Ebert of the Chicago Sun-Times gave the film three out of four stars and wrote, "Watching The Eighth Day, I felt contradictory impulses. On the one hand, I was acutely aware of how conventional the story was. On the other, I was enchanted by the friendship between Harry and Georges. Auteuil is a fine actor, and so is Duquenne, who belongs to a Brussels experimental theatrical troupe and approaches every scene with a combination of complete commitment and utter abandon."

=== Awards ===
This film was nominated for the Palme d'Or award, the top prize at the 1996 Cannes Film Festival. It did win the Best Actor award at the festival, which was given to both Pascal Duquenne and Daniel Auteuil.

The film was also nominated for a César Award and a Golden Globe award.

== See also ==
- List of submissions to the 69th Academy Awards for Best Foreign Language Film
- List of Belgian submissions for the Academy Award for Best Foreign Language Film
