= Toto the Hero =

- VHS artwork
- Directed by: Jaco Van Dormael; Bénédicte Liénard (assistant director)
- Written by: Didier De Neck; Pascal Lonhay; Jaco Van Dormael; Laurette Vankeerberghen
- Produced by: Pierre Drouot; Dany Geys; Luciano Gloor
- Starring: Michel Bouquet; Jo De Backer; Mireille Perrier; Gisela Uhlen
- Cinematography: Walther Vanden Ende
- Edited by: Susana Rossberg
- Music by: Pierre Van Dormael
- Release date: 16 May 1991
- Running time: 91 minutes
- Countries: Belgium; France; Germany
- Language: French
- Box office: 1 million admissions (Europe)

Toto the Hero (French: Toto le héros) is a 1991 Belgian film (co-produced with France and Germany) by Belgian film director and screenwriter Jaco Van Dormael. It won the Caméra d'Or award at the Cannes Film Festival in 1991, and the César Award for Best Foreign Film in 1992. The film was selected as the Belgian entry for the Best Foreign Language Film at the 64th Academy Awards, but was not accepted as a nominee.

== Plot ==
Ostensibly set in the near future, the film tells the life story of an elderly man named Thomas Van Hasebroeck (who has dubbed himself Toto, after a childhood fantasy), looking back on his ordinary, apparently uneventful life in a complex mosaic of flashbacks, interspersed with fantasies about how events might have turned out differently. It is not always possible to tell the difference between embellished or manufactured memories and fantasies, as Thomas is a very unreliable narrator, but some scenes (such as the narrative thread that features Toto as a secret agent) are definitely fantasized.

Thomas firmly believes his life to have been "stolen" from him by Alfred Kant, born at the same time as Thomas, who Thomas believes was inadvertently switched with himself as a baby (characteristically, the film remains ambiguous as to whether this substitution ever actually happened, with Thomas' only substantiation being his apparent vivid memory of the day he was born). Thomas' jealousy of Alfred has overshadowed all his life, often with tragic consequences for his loved ones, and he is plotting revenge. Throughout most of the film, his intended revenge takes the shape of a plot to kill Alfred, but in the end Thomas finds a more creative and surprising way to "take back" his life.

== Cast ==
- Michel Bouquet as Thomas (old man)
- Jo De Backer as Thomas (adult)
- Thomas Godet as Thomas (child)
- Gisela Uhlen as Evelyne (old woman)
- Mireille Perrier as Evelyne (young woman)
- Sandrine Blancke as Alice
- Michel Robin as Alfred (old's voice)
- Peter Böhlke as Alfred (old man)
- Didier Ferney as Alfred (adult)
- Hugo Harold-Harrison as Alfred (child)
- Fabienne Loriaux as Thomas' Mother
- Klaus Schindler as Thomas' Father
- Pascal Duquenne as Celestin (adult)
- Karim Moussati as Celestin (child)
- Didier De Neck as Mr. Kant
- Christine Smeysters as Mrs. Kant
- Jo Deseure as Sales Woman
- Bouli Lanners as Gangster

== Release ==
The film is available on DVD in the UK and mainland Europe. It was released on Blu-Ray in the UK and United States in August 2020 by Arrow Academy, with documentaries on the making of the film ('Memories of Hero') and on François Schuiten ('François Schuiten, Architect of an Unfinished Dream').

== Reception ==
Vincent Canby gave the film an enthusiastic review in The New York Times, calling it "an enormously witty, bittersweet comedy" that "is both shocking and elegiacal." He wrote that "the film has the density of a fine short story, written by a master who somehow manages to create a novel-sized world through an uncanny command of ellipsis" and praised "Van Dormael's extraordinary gift for the simultaneous expression of utterly contradictory emotions." Variety described the film as "a winning blend of kid's fantasy and adult comedy that's as fresh as a hot croissant." Time Out called it "an immensely vibrant, inventive, compassionate movie", and added that though Van Dormael has "an engagingly witty eye for the absurd", he has rooted his film "in emotional reality, so that Thomas' life, loves, desires and anxieties take on great poignancy." Roger Ebert admitted it was "an interesting film", and remarked that he would have liked it more "if it had been more bitter and unforgiving; if someone like Bunuel had directed it".

On review aggregator website Rotten Tomatoes, the film holds an approval rating of 91%, based on 11 reviews, and an average rating of 7.7/10.

The film had admissions of 477,000 in France and 500,000 from Italy, the United Kingdom, Germany, Netherlands and Spain. In Brussels, it was the seventh most popular film of the year (and most popular Belgian film) with a gross of 16.9 million Belgian francs.

== See also ==
- List of submissions to the 64th Academy Awards for Best Foreign Language Film
- List of Belgian submissions for Academy Award for Best Foreign Language Film
