= National Norwegian Design Awards =

Annual awards for visual communication in Norway

National Norwegian Graphic Design Awards (Visuelt)
- Native name: Visuelt
- Description: Norway's most important competition for visual communication professionals
- Country: Norway
- Presented by: Grafill (Norwegian Organisation for Visual Communication)
- Website: https://www.grafill.no/visuelt/

The National Norwegian Graphic Design Awards (Norwegian: Visuelt) in an annual ceremony which gives tribute to the professionals working with visual communication in Norway. Established in 1993, the Visuelt has gradually grown to become the most important competition for designers and illustrators in Norway.

The main categories are: Graphic Design, Illustration, Interactive Design and Moving Image.

The 2012 National Norwegian Graphic Design Awards were presented on May 4, 2012, in Oslo.

== Ceremony ==
The Visual Competition awards prizes to the best submitted works in Norwegian graphic design, illustration and other visual communication. A number of industry awards are given out in a number of categories with varying levels of support and registration. The Classic Award, an honorary award that Grafill first awarded in 2002, is, however, given to a practitioner who has maintained high professional quality and been of great importance to their profession over many years. Only paid entries are included in the competition. Most practitioners do not submit works.
