= Lumière and Company =

- Written by: Philippe Poulet
- Produced by: Neal Edelstein; Fabienne Servan-Schreiber
- Starring: Pernilla August; Antoine Duléry; Pascal Duquenne; Bruno Ganz; Ticky Holgado; Isabelle Huppert; Neil Jordan; Alessandra Martines; François Mitterrand; Liam Neeson; Sven Nykvist; Lena Olin; Aidan Quinn; Stephen Rea; Nathalie Richard; Alan Rickman; Otto Sander; Zinedine Soualem; Max von Sydow
- Cinematography: Peter Deming; Didier Ferry; Frédéric LeClair; Jean-Yves Le Mener; Sarah Moon; Sven Nykvist; Philippe Poulet
- Edited by: Roger Ikhlef; Timothy Miller
- Music by: Jean-Jacques Lemêtre
- Distributed by: Pierre Grise Distribution
- Release date: 1995
- Running time: 88 minutes
- Countries: Denmark; France; Spain; Sweden
- Languages: Danish; English; French; Greek; Japanese; Mandarin; Norwegian; Swedish

Lumière and Company (original title: Lumière et compagnie) is a 1995 anthology film made in collaboration between forty-one international film directors. The project consists of short films made by each of the filmmakers using the original Cinématographe camera invented by the brothers, Auguste and Louis Lumière.

The shorts were edited in-camera and constrained by three rules:

1. A short may be no longer than 52 seconds
2. No synchronized sound
3. No more than three takes

== Directors ==
- Merzak Allouache
- Gabriel Axel
- Vicente Aranda
- Theo Angelopoulos
- Bigas Luna
- John Boorman (starring Liam Neeson, Alan Rickman, Aidan Quinn, Neil Jordan, and Stephen Rea)
- Youssef Chahine
- Alain Corneau
- Costa-Gavras
- Raymond Depardon
- Francis Girod
- Peter Greenaway
- Lasse Hallström (starring Lena Olin)
- Michael Haneke
- Hugh Hudson
- Gaston Kaboré
- Abbas Kiarostami (starring Isabelle Huppert)
- Cédric Klapisch (starring Zinedine Soualem)
- Andrei Konchalovsky
- Patrice Leconte
- Spike Lee
- Claude Lelouch (starring Ticky Holgado, Antoine Duléry and Alessandra Martines)
- David Lynch
- Ismail Merchant & James Ivory (music by Richard Robbins)
- Claude Miller
- Sarah Moon (starring several of the directors featured elsewhere, including Spike Lee, Claude Lelouch, and Patrice Leconte)
- Idrissa Ouedraogo
- Arthur Penn
- Lucian Pintilie
- Jacques Rivette (starring Nathalie Richard)
- Helma Sanders-Brahms
- Jerry Schatzberg
- Nadine Trintignant
- Fernando Trueba
- Liv Ullmann (starring Sven Nykvist, Pernilla August, and Max von Sydow)
- Jaco Van Dormael (starring Pascal Duquenne)
- Régis Wargnier (starring François Mitterrand)
- Wim Wenders (starring Bruno Ganz and Otto Sander)
- Yoshishige Yoshida
- Zhang Yimou

== Summary ==
1. Patrice Leconte: A recreation of L'Arrivée d'un train en gare de La Ciotat 100 years later at the same station.
2. Gabriel Axel: The evolution of the arts is shown, culminating in cinema. Then, two men shoot each other in a duel.
3. Claude Miller: A girl is repeatedly pushed off a scale by others, before a man picks her up and puts her on his shoulders before getting on the scale.
4. Jacques Rivette: A girl plays hopscotch while a woman roller-skates. The roller-skating woman collides with a man reading a newspaper.
5. Michael Haneke: Various shots of TV news on March 19, 1995, exactly 100 years after the filming of L'Arrivée d'un train en gare de La Ciotat.
6. Fernando Trueba: Felix Romero, A conscientious objector who has refused to partake in Spanish military service, departs from a prison in Zaragoza.
7. Merzak Allouache: A couple walk through a park and notice the camera. They both examine it before the man shoves the woman out of the way.
8. Raymond Depardon: Children use a ladder to put a hat on top of a large statue.
9. Wim Wenders: Two men examine a cityscape.
10. Jaco Van Dormael: A smiling couple kiss.
11. Nadine Trintignant: Tourists wander around the courtyard of the Louvre.
12. Régis Wargnier: François Mitterrand in a park walks toward the camera. Voiceover recollects a scene from a film.
13. Hugh Hudson: Japanese schoolchildren in Hiroshima visit a monument. Audio from news reports of the bombing of Hiroshima plays.
14. Zhang Yimou: A man plays a traditional Chinese bowed musical instrument while a woman dances. They switch from their traditional clothing to punk fashion and the man plays a guitar while the woman thrashes her head.
15. Liv Ullmann: Cinematographer Sven Nykvist operates his camera.
16. Vicente Aranda: A victory parade drives through the street.
17. Lucian Pintilie: People climb into a helicopter. The helicopter lifts off.
18. John Boorman: Behind-the-scenes of the filming of Michael Collins.
19. Claude Lelouch: A couple embraces as various camera crews move around them.
20. Abbas Kiarostami: An egg fries on a skillet. A voicemail plays.
21. Lasse Hallström: A woman with a baby waves at a passing train.
22. Costa-Gavras: Various young adults gather around to look at the camera.
23. Yoshishige Yoshida: Alternates between a shot of Yoshida with the camera and a destroyed building in Hiroshima while the sound of an explosion is heard.
24. Idrissa Ouedraogo: A man goes for a swim in a river before being scared off by another man wearing a mask.
25. Gaston Kaboré: Outside of a cinema, a group of friends with a camera discover a truck full of filmstrips.
26. Youssef Chahine: Two men film the Pyramids of Giza. Another man runs up to them and destroys their camera before storming off.
27. Helma Sanders-Brahms: A tribute to Louis Cochet - a man directs lighting equipment next to a waterfall.
28. Francis Girod: A large image of a television displaying a director in his chair is painted over with white paint.
29. Cédric Klapisch: A man and a woman attempt to act out a scene where they embrace.
30. Alain Corneau: A woman dances as her clothes rapidly change colors.
31. Merchant & Ivory: People wander the city streets of Paris.
32. Jerry Schatzberg: A garbage worker puts trash in the back of his truck. A woman gets into an argument with him when she doesn't want to give up her trash.
33. Spike Lee: Footage of his newly-born daughter, Satchel Lee.
34. Andrei Konchalovsky: In a natural landscape, the carcass of an animal slowly decays.
35. Peter Greenaway: Various images, including the August and Louis Lumière, various years, a nude man sitting in a chair
36. Bigas Luna: A nude woman sitting in a field nurses a baby.
37. Arthur Penn: A man tied to a bed screams out. In the bunk above him is a pregnant woman.
38. David Lynch: Police discover a murder victim and inform the family.
39. Theo Angelopoulos: Odysseus wakes up on a rocky seashore. In his attempts to figure out where he is, he stares down the camera.
