= Mr. Nobody (film) =

2009 science fiction drama film directed by Jaco Van Dormael

- Theatrical release poster
- Directed by: Jaco Van Dormael
- Written by: Jaco Van Dormael
- Produced by: Philippe Godeau; Alfred Hürmer; Christian Larouche; Marco Mehlitz; Jaco Van Dormael
- Starring: Jared Leto; Sarah Polley; Diane Kruger; Linh Dan Pham; Rhys Ifans; Natasha Little; Toby Regbo; Juno Temple
- Cinematography: Christophe Beaucarne
- Edited by: Matyas Veress; Susan Shipton
- Music by: Pierre Van Dormael
- Production companies: Pan-Européenne; Integral Film; Lago Film; Christal Films; Toto&Co Films
- Distributed by: Wild Bunch
- Release dates: 12 September 2009 (Venice); 13 January 2010 (Belgium and France); 8 July 2010 (Germany); 16 July 2010 (Canada)
- Running time: 141 minutes (Note: The running time varies across different versions: the one presented at the Venice Film Festival is 138 minutes, the theatrical release is 141 minutes, and the director's cut is 155 minutes.)
- Countries: Belgium; Canada; France; Germany
- Language: English
- Budget: €33 million; ($47 million)
- Box office: $3.5 million

Mr. Nobody is a 2009 science fiction drama film written and directed by Jaco Van Dormael. An international co-production between Belgium, France, Germany, and Canada, it marks Van Dormael's first English-language feature. The film stars Jared Leto as Nemo Nobody, the last mortal on Earth after humanity has achieved quasi-immortality. As a 118-year-old man reflecting on his life, Nemo recounts alternative versions of his past, exploring the impact of key decisions through a nonlinear narrative that incorporates the multiverse hypothesis. The ensemble cast also includes Sarah Polley, Diane Kruger, Linh Dan Pham, Rhys Ifans, Natasha Little, Toby Regbo, and Juno Temple.

Van Dormael began developing Mr. Nobody in 2001, spending years crafting a screenplay that combined speculative science, experimental cinema, and motifs of human emotion. Filming took place from June to September 2007 across Belgium, Germany, and Canada, with cinematographer Christophe Beaucarne using 35mm film. This was followed by an extensive post-production process, including visual effects, which took a year and a half to complete. The film marked the final collaboration with composer Pierre Van Dormael, the director's brother, who died shortly after completing the score.

Mr. Nobody premiered on 12 September 2009 at the 66th Venice International Film Festival, where it won the Golden Osella. Following creative differences with studio executives, the film's release strategy was revised to include a limited theatrical run, which began in Belgium and France on 13 January 2010, before expanding to streaming in international markets. The film received positive reviews from critics, who praised its screenplay, visual style, musical score, and cast performances, although its narrative structure sparked some debate. It won the André Cavens Award from the Belgian Film Critics Association and was nominated for seven Magritte Awards, winning six, including Best Film and Best Director for Van Dormael.

== Plot ==
In 2092, humanity has conquered mortality. The world watches as 118-year-old Nemo Nobody, the last mortal, approaches death. Psychiatrist Dr. Feldheim uses hypnosis to help Nemo remember his life. A journalist also interviews Nemo, whose recollections are from three points in his life: ages 9, 15, and 34. Nemo makes contradictory statements, describing his past as having unfolded in multiple ways. He says that, before birth, children know everything that will happen in their lives, but at the moment of conception the Angels of Oblivion erase the knowledge. He says the Angels missed him, allowing him to "remember" his different possible futures.

After his parents' divorce, 9-year-old Nemo had to choose whether to live with his mother or his father. He describes what happened in both scenarios.

Life with his mother

Nemo and his mother move to Montreal. When he is a teenager, he is attracted to Anna. At the beach, Anna asks Nemo to swim with her and her friends. He insults her friends, and they hardly see each other again.

In an alternate timeline, Nemo admits to Anna that he cannot swim, and they spend time together. Anna's father Harry marries Nemo's mother, and the step-siblings begin an affair, pledging their lives to one another. Harry and Nemo's mother divorce, and Anna goes to New York with her father. The teenagers lose touch. Years later, Nemo and Anna pass at a train station and immediately recognize each other. After a passionate reunion, Anna says she is not ready for a relationship. She asks Nemo to call her and meet at a lighthouse, but he loses her number. Nemo waits at the lighthouse every day, but Anna does not come.

In another timeline, Anna and Nemo are married with children. He works at a television studio. Driving home, he loses control of his car, plummets into a lake, and drowns.

Life with his father

As a teenager, Nemo lives in England with his disabled father and is writing a science fiction story about a journey to Mars. He falls in love with Elise, whose boyfriend is 22-year-old Stefano. Nemo has a motorcycle accident and is hospitalized in a vegetative state or pseudocoma. He can still perceive the world and detects his parents' reunion at his bedside. He imagines his fingers on his typewriter keyboard and continues working on his story.

In another timeline, Elise says she is in love with Stefano, but he does not love her. Nemo assures her of his feelings until she gives in, and they marry. In one version of this timeline, Elise dies in an explosion on their wedding day, and Nemo takes her ashes to Mars as he had promised when they were teenagers. On the way back to Earth he meets Anna, but the ship is destroyed by asteroids. In another version, one of Nemo's television studio coworkers drowns in the lake. Their widow is Anna, whom Nemo feels he has seen before. Another timeline has Nemo and Elise married with three children. Elise has borderline personality disorder and chronic depression and, despite Nemo's attempts to save their marriage, leaves him to pursue Stefano.

Alternately, after being rejected by Elise, teenage Nemo resolves to marry the first girl who dances with him, who turns out to be Jean. Though they marry, have two sons, and become rich, Nemo is bored and puts all of his assets in Jean's name and leaves. Making decisions via coin toss, he claims to be the person for whom a chauffeur is waiting. He is taken to a hotel where he is murdered and his body is dumped in the woods by the assassins, who question whether they have killed the right man.

Adult Nemo also repeatedly awakens in a surreal environment dominated by argyle patterns. Following clues that he finds in this world, he arrives at a dilapidated house with a DVD player and television. In an interactive video, 118-year-old Nemo tells 34-year-old Nemo that this is a universe where Nemo was never born, and his consciousness is stuck in limbo. Old Nemo states that he is experiencing the story from the end, and that adult Nemo must stay alive until 5:50 a.m. on 12 February 2092.

In epilogue, Old Nemo tells the journalist that neither of them exists — they are figments of 9-year-old Nemo's imagination as he struggles to choose between his parents. The boy is trying to choose by tracing the potential outcomes. He takes a third option: leaving both parents for an unknown future.

Near death, Nemo recalls reuniting with Anna at the lighthouse. The moment of his death arrives, and his last word, "Anna", is broadcast. The universe ceases to expand and begins to contract. The flow of time reverses, old Nemo comes back to life and cackles joyously. The other Nemos come back to life and Nemo's parents get back together. 9-year-old Nemo runs in reverse to 9-year-old Anna and they reverse-skip stones together.

== Cast ==
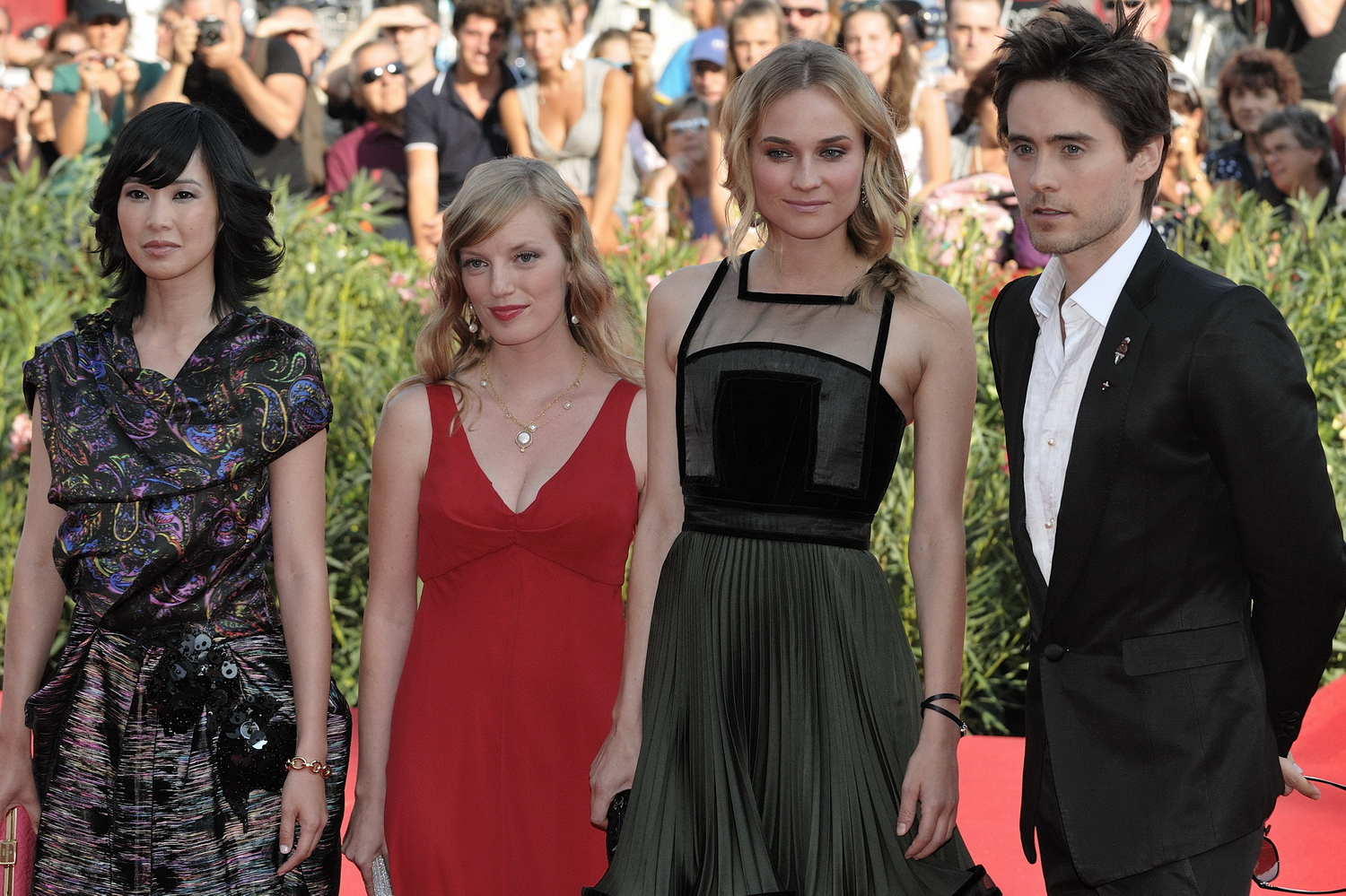
The cast at the premiere for the film in September 2009 (left to right): Linh Dan Pham, Sarah Polley, Diane Kruger, and Jared Leto

- Jared Leto as Nemo Nobody (both 34- and 118-years-old). Nemo is Latin for "nobody". Leto described the role by saying, "Mr. Nobody is everyone and no one all at the same time, an illusion, the product of his own dreams. He's love, he's hope, he's fear, he's life, and he's death. This is without doubt the most complex character I've ever played. It was a challenge to keep all these lives concentrated into one character for the duration of the filming without losing myself. But we had outlines and things that helped me to keep track of where we were."
  - Toby Regbo as Nemo (aged 15)
  - Thomas Byrne as Nemo (aged 9)
  - Noa De Costanzo as Nemo (aged 5)
- Sarah Polley as Elise. Polley was the first actor to be cast in the film. She described Elise as "a young woman who carries a lot of love inside her." She yearns to be the best of mothers but just can't do it. She's frustrated because of this inability to live the way she would like to live, all of this stemming from her depression. She doesn't understand why she can't pull out of it. Over time, she develops a feeling of shame and guilt towards her husband and her children."
  - Clare Stone as Elise (age 15)
- Diane Kruger as Anna. Kruger described Anna as "the most complete of all the characters. She never makes any compromises, in any one of her lives. She gets married and keeps her promise until the end: she will not fall in love with anyone else." Actress Eva Green was originally reported to have been cast in the role.
  - Juno Temple as Anna (age 15)
  - Laura Brumagne as Anna (age 9)
- Linh Dan Pham as Jean. Pham said that Jean "loves Nemo Nobody with a passion, but he doesn't love her. Their meeting was a misunderstanding. She thought he was honest and full of love for her. But as soon as they start a family she realizes that something is missing in their relationship, that he's never really there. It also shows that lives that seem perfect on paper might not be so perfect in reality."
  - Audrey Giacomini as Jean (age 15)
- Rhys Ifans as Nemo's Father. Van Dormael chose Ifans for the part after seeing his "multifaceted" performances in Notting Hill (1999) and Enduring Love (2004).
- Natasha Little as Nemo's Mother. Little was suggested for the part by the casting director in London. Van Dormael said that "her role was decisive for the film: it was necessary that the mother should destroy the childhood happiness but that one would feel the need to go with her at the same time. That's what Natasha managed to achieve."
- Allan Corduner as Dr. Feldheim
- Daniel Mays as Young Journalist
- Michael Riley as Harry, Anna's father
- Harold Manning as TV Host
- Ben Mansfield as Stefano (both 22- and 40-years-old), teenage-Elise's boyfriend
- Chiara Caselli as a beggar in the railway station

Director Jaco Van Dormael makes a cameo appearance as Brazilian Man, and Pascal Duquenne, one of the stars of Dormael's previous film The Eighth Day, also has a cameo as Henry.

== Production ==
=== Writing ===
The idea of parallel lives had been explored in earlier films such as Run Lola Run (1998) and Sliding Doors (1998), which influenced Jaco Van Dormael's writing of Mr. Nobody. Unlike those films, however, this one has philosophical underpinnings inspired by scientific tomes on chaos theory and the butterfly effect, pigeon superstition, and the space-time continuum. Van Dormael stated: "My starting point was a 12-minute short I made in 1982 called È pericoloso sporgersi. A kid runs behind a train with two possible choices: to go with his mother or with his father. From there we follow two possible futures. I started one version based on the fact that a woman jumps or doesn't jump on a train. Then Sliding Doors by Peter Howitt came out, followed by Run Lola Run by Tom Tykwer. I had to find something else. And that's when I realised that the story I was trying to tell was not binary, that I was above all interested by the multiplicity and complexity of choices. With this screenplay I wanted to make the viewer feel the abyss that is the infinity of possibilities. Beyond this, I wanted to find a different way of telling a story. I wanted the gaze of the child on his future to meet the gaze of the old man he has become on his past. I wanted to talk about complexity through cinema, which is a simplifying medium. While reality around us is more and more complex, the information is more and more succinct, political speeches are more and more simplistic. What interests me is complexity. Not the simple answers, which are reassuring but bound to be false."

Describing the scale of the film, the director said, "My producers don't like me saying it, but it's really a big-budget experimental film about the many different lives one person can live, depending on the choices he makes. It's about the infinite possibilities facing any person. There are no good or bad choices in life. It's simply that each choice will create another life for you. What's interesting is to be alive."

While producing the film, Van Dormael took the unique step of publishing his screenplay.

=== Development ===
The film is Van Dormael's first feature since The Eighth Day in 1996. He began trying to make Mr. Nobody in 2001, but production on the project, his first English-language feature, did not start until 2007. Regarding the decision to not film in one of the languages of his native Belgium, the director said: "The story came to me in English. It's a story set over very long distances and time frames. One of the strands of the plot is about a kid who must choose between living with his mother in Canada or his father in England. There are also some incredible English-speaking actors I wanted to work with." Van Dormael began preparing for production on Mr. Nobody in February 2007, and Sarah Polley was the first actor to be cast. Jared Leto was later cast in the primary role of Nemo Nobody.

The production budget for Mr. Nobody was €33 million (US$47 million), making it the most expensive Belgian film ever made. The budget was approved before casting was done based on Van Dormael's involvement and the strength of his script. Half of the budget was provided by the film's French producer, Philippe Godeau, through his production company, Pan-Européenne, and the other half was provided by distributors Wild Bunch and Pathé. Production took place throughout 2007, lasting 120 days and traveling to Belgium, Germany, and Canada. Scenes were filmed on location in Montreal, Canada, and at Babelsberg Studios in Berlin, Germany. Van Dormael said: "I think the film needed that for these multiple lives. Each time a new style of setting is required. And each life is filmed in a different style, with a different grammar for the camera, the colours, the decor. At the same time, if all the styles have to be very contrasted, they knock together by fusing." The three lives that Nemo Nobody experiences were separated by color-coding and musical cues. Each life's design was also based on the work of British photographer Martin Parr.

=== Visual effects ===
Van Dormael hired visual effects supervisor Louis Morin, known for his work in Eternal Sunshine of the Spotless Mind (2004), to create visual effects for Mr. Nobody. All five hundred visual effects shots were produced in Quebec by local companies. Modus FX announced having delivered 121 digital visual effects shots for the film. The company was entrusted with complex sequences that could not be captured on film, some involving the digital reproduction of entire cities, villages, and other-worldly settings, and others involving complex transitions between the different worlds and multiple lives of Nemo Nobody. Their post-production contributions involved 37 digital artists and technicians across a six-month period. A long list of software (including Autodesk's Softimage and Maya, Side Effects' Houdini, and The Foundry's Nuke) and the creation of a multitude of in-house tools, programs, and techniques were required for the shots delivered.

=== Music ===
Like Jaco Van Dormael's previous films, the score for Mr. Nobody was written by his older brother, Pierre Van Dormael. For the film, Pierre worked on simple themes and out-of-sync loops, "a mixture of superficial simplicity and underlying complexity." He wrote themes that overlapped to form new ones, each theme continuing to exist while being mixed with the others. The director did not want the music to be overtly emotional, so he and Pierre chose a minimalist orchestration, more often than not just a single guitar. Jaco said: "We wanted the instrument and the player to be felt. This stance actually sums up the whole adventure: a maximalist project with a minimalist approach." Mr. Nobody was the last film Pierre worked on before his death in 2008, and his music won the Magritte Award for Best Original Score in 2012.

The soundtrack features songs by Pierre Van Dormael, Buddy Holly, Hans Zimmer, Otis Redding, Eurythmics, Pixies, Wallace Collection, Nena, Ella Fitzgerald, and The Andrews Sisters, as well as versions of "Mr. Sandman" performed by The Chordettes, The King Brothers, Emmylou Harris, and Gob, and recordings of compositions by Erik Satie and Benjamin Britten, among others.

== Themes ==
Nemo's possible future wives: Jean, Elise, and Anna

Mr. Nobody can be seen as a tale about choice. Nemo, a nine-year-old boy, has been thrust into a position where he must make an impossible decision—to choose between his mother and father. In the seconds preceding the rest of his life, he wonders where each choice will take him. The forces of the universe working to bring about total chaos are counteracted by this boy's overactive imagination. The dilemma that causes the film's main problem (not knowing the future), once solved, makes it all the more difficult: "I don't know the future, therefore I cannot make a decision. Now that I know the future I still cannot make one." The eloquent interplay between philosophical lifestyle and what forges reality is epitomized by the way the film constantly jumps between scenes of the young boy, the adolescent, and the mature man. The film takes a four-dimensionalist view of the nature and existence of life in the universe, with each decision branching off to create an entirely separate alternate universe. Mr. Nobody raises many ontological arguments about the subjective nature of time and investigates how actions have universal consequences, and how every single choice, irrespective of its simplicity or complexity, can make, alter, or change a lifetime.

The film also makes substantial use of chaos theory, string theory, and the butterfly effect to accentuate the lack of control that humans, as individuals, possess. There are numerous scenes, at each stage of his life, where Nemo is subject to the whims of chance, often plunging into water, a place where humans lack control, as a visual symbol of the powerlessness attributed to the human condition. The theories are used to compound reality in the film, a reality in which time always moves in one direction—the smoke never goes back into the cigarette. Then, at the end, when it seems the universe is on the precipice of ultimate chaos, making use of the Big Crunch theory, time halts and begins to reverse. This brings the freedom from choice Nemo had been seeking, for, as Nemo says in the film, "as long as you don't choose, everything remains possible." The tale of Nemo Nobody reflects a life of choices, whether or not we made the correct choices, and what would happen if we could go back and change them. In the end, Mr. Nobody, at age 118, states that it doesn't matter what we choose, because each choice, once made, has just as much significance as any alternate choice would have. The film portrays a life where we are all subject to chance, the dimensions by which we construct our reality (height, length, width, and time), and the imagination of our former selves, and, once the boy Nemo knows the outcome of a given choice, he instinctively opts for another.

The different colors used in the film have symbolic meanings. Each of the three main storylines has its own unique hue that highlights its originality and unlikeness to the others. The color differentiation can be traced as far back as Nemo's childhood, where his possible future wives, Jean, Elise, and Anna, sit on a bench, wearing yellow, blue, and red dresses, respectively. In his life with Jean, Nemo seeks material well-being and independence, and yellow—the color of life and wealth—emphasizes this. Choosing Elise, Nemo experiences the consequences of depression and despair, which are themes associated with the color blue. Finally, the true love and passionate relationship between Nemo and Anna is symbolized by the red color of Anna's dress. It is also noteworthy that the unborn Nemo is shown living in a white world, as white contains all colors of the visible spectrum, which supports the allegorical message of the film that all things are possible until a choice is made. At the end of his life, Nemo is a decrepit old man and lives in a white surrounding (room, clothes, doctor), indicating that the fate of the protagonist leads him back to his origins—the point at which everything is possible.

The idea of a child learning about their whole life in the womb only to have an angel take the memory away is a reference to the Jewish concept of Lailah, the Angel of Conception, and it also bears a resemblance to the Myth of Er as found in the Plato's Republic.

== Release ==
Mr. Nobody underwent a complex distribution process, shaped by the tension between Van Dormael's artistic vision and the commercial demands of the film's financiers. Initially, the film was completed with a runtime of 155 minutes, faithful to the original script, and was scheduled for a theatrical release in Belgium and France in May 2009. Earlier that year, The Hollywood Reporter revealed that Mr. Nobody was being considered as a potential opening film for the 62nd Cannes Film Festival. However, when offered a non-competitive slot, the film's main financiers, Wild Bunch and Pathé, rejected the proposal and demanded a new cut to make the film more commercially viable. Studio executives argued that the original length would limit cinema programming opportunities and that a reduced runtime would allow for more daily screenings.

Van Dormael, who had final cut privilege, initially resisted the proposed changes. However, faced with the possibility of distribution being restricted to digital and home video markets, the film was trimmed by six minutes and ultimately selected for competition at the 66th Venice Film Festival. Wild Bunch, seeing this cut as failing to meet their expectations, decided to withdraw the film from the Biennale, marking an unprecedented move in the festival's history. Following further negotiations, an agreement was reached to release both the theatrical version and the director's cut, with Van Dormael agreeing to trim an additional twenty minutes, reducing the runtime to 138 minutes. The film eventually had its world premiere on 12 September 2009 at the Venice Film Festival. Six days later, it was screened as a special presentation at the 2009 Toronto International Film Festival.

=== Limited theatrical release ===
Originally scheduled for release on 27 May 2009 in Belgium and France, the film was postponed to 7 October and eventually debuted on 13 January 2010, distributed by Belga Films and Pathé. In Germany and Canada, it was released starting from 8 July 2010 by Concorde Filmverleih and Les Films Séville, respectively. Citing creative differences with the director, Wild Bunch, the film's international distributor, restructured the distribution strategy and marketing campaign, aiming to mitigate what they anticipated as potential financial losses. As a result, the film had a limited theatrical release in the production countries while focusing on digital and home video formats for international markets.

This led the filmmaker, production companies, and film critics to voice their disappointment and displeasure over the move. In open defiance of the studios, Van Dormael publicly encouraged audiences to pirate the film. Later, in an interview for the Cineteca di Bologna, he criticized the neglectful handling of the film's release and argued that piracy succeeded where the industry had failed. Writing for The Encyclopedia of Science Fiction, Nick Lowe remarked that the film “was all but dumped by its distributors," while Jean-Philippe Thiriart, in a report for Ardenne magazine, observed that Wild Bunch had clearly prevailed in the dispute with Van Dormael.

The film also received limited releases in the Netherlands, Russia, Czech Republic, Spain, Sweden, Finland, Poland, Croatia, and Portugal. In the United States, Magnolia Pictures showed the film on four screens in November 2013, following its digital streaming release one month earlier. Jack Giroux of Film School Rejects referred to the delay as "a shame" and pointed out that it was a film better suited for the theater experience rather than for streaming. The director's cut was eventually screened on various occasions.

=== Home media ===
The home video release of Mr. Nobody debuted in Belgium on 20 July 2010, with DVD and Blu-ray editions distributed by Belga. Both standard and collector's editions were made available, and each included the director's cut. The following day, the film was made available for streaming and video-on-demand through Proximus Pickx, also featuring the director's cut. Van Dormael described the home media release as a way to present the film in its original form, as it was initially conceived before being altered at the request of studio executives. He remarked that, with this release, there were no longer any economic restrictions limiting how audiences could engage with the film, likening it to fully experiencing a work in its entirety.

This extended version, with a runtime of 155 minutes, incorporated twelve new scenes, twenty-three extended scenes, and a total of fourteen minutes of integrated footage. The standard edition DVD included an audio commentary by Van Dormael as a bonus feature, while the collector's edition, available in both DVD and Blu-ray formats, offered additional content such as deleted scenes, a behind-the-scenes documentary, a photo gallery, and the film's original score by Pierre Van Dormael, provided on a separate compact disc.

== Reception ==
=== Box office ===
Mr. Nobody opened in 36 theaters in Belgium, debuting in fourth place at the box office and ranking first among new releases, with a per-theater average of $6,331—the third highest after Sherlock Holmes and Invictus. The film remained in theaters for 23 weeks, ultimately selling 100,000 admissions in the country. It became the second highest-grossing film of 2010 from Belgium, surpassed only by A Turtle's Tale: Sammy's Adventures. In France, Mr. Nobody debuted at number eight at the box office, screening in 150 theaters. It had the smallest release of the week in terms of the number of theaters, alongside Armored. The film concluded its theatrical run in two weeks, selling a total of 142,500 admissions. A writer for RTBF described this as a respectable result for a film shown on only 150 screens, while also observing that the limited release affected its overall box office performance. Mr. Nobody grossed an estimated $1.9 million in Belgium and France and $1.6 million in other countries, for a worldwide total of $3.5 million.

The film received a limited release in twelve additional markets outside Belgium and France, including Russia ($615,719), Poland ($334,114), Spain ($322,056), Finland ($217,774), and Germany ($188,088). In Russia and the CIS, it became the highest-grossing limited released film of the year and the third highest-grossing of all time, despite being screened in only four theaters. An opinion piece in The Numbers argued that the film's limited theatrical release, combined with its simultaneous availability on streaming platforms, failed to capitalize on its potential earnings and ultimately fell short of recovering its €33 million production budget. Commenting on the film's theatrical release, Van Dormael remarked, "Financially, it was a failure, but artistically speaking, I think it's the best thing I can do in my life." According to the Centre du Cinéma et de l'Audiovisuel, the box office performance of Mr. Nobody, alongside A Turtle's Tale: Sammy's Adventures, contributed to a 25% rise in attendance for films from Belgium in 2010.

=== Audience viewership ===
Mr. Nobody's distribution on home media was instrumental in expanding its viewership and establishing its status as a cult classic. According to The Hollywood Reporter, the release on DVD and Blu-ray allowed the film to reach a significantly broader audience compared to its limited theatrical run. Streaming and video-on-demand services further amplified its visibility, driven by word of mouth and reflected in favorable rankings across multiple regions. Additionally, Digital Trends, a platform specializing in streaming analytics, listed Mr. Nobody among the best science fiction films available on Amazon Prime Video.

According to JustWatch, a guide to streaming content with access to data from more than 20 million users around the world, Mr. Nobody ranked as the third most-watched film in Belgium upon its digital release. It performed strongly internationally as well, reaching the top spot in Italy, third in Canada, sixth in France and the Netherlands, ninth in the United States, thirteenth in South Korea, and eighteenth in Austria and the United Kingdom. Despite the circulation of pirated copies priced at as little as one yen in parts of Asia, the film became the most-streamed title in Japan during its first week of digital release.

=== Critical response ===
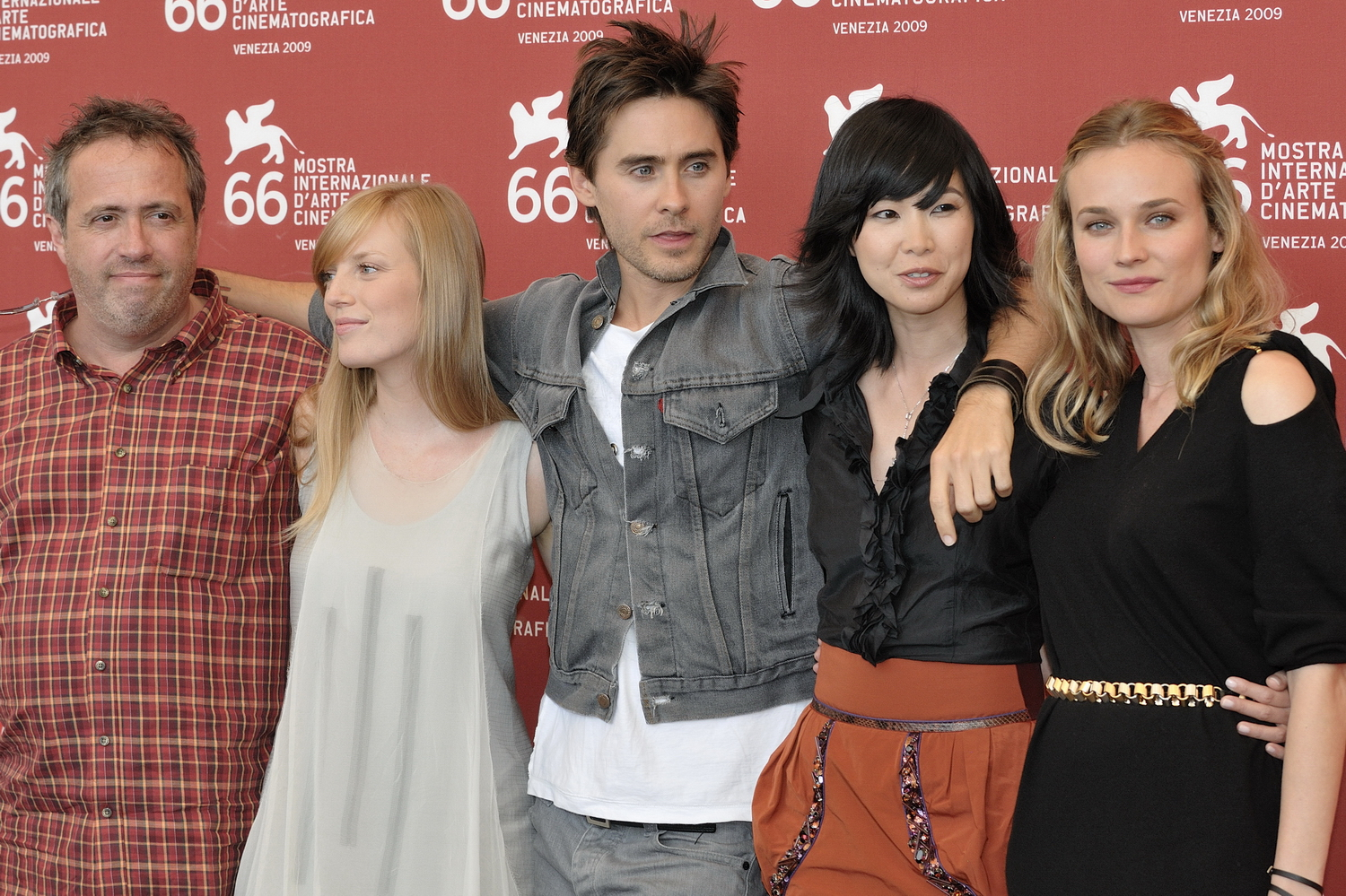
Director Jaco Van Dormael along with actors Sarah Polley, Jared Leto, Linh Dan Pham, and Diane Kruger at the 66th Venice International Film Festival

Upon its premiere at the 66th Venice International Film Festival, Mr. Nobody was positively received with a ten-minute standing ovation from the audience. On the review aggregator website Rotten Tomatoes, the film has a 68% rating from 31 critics and a weighted average rating of 6.58/10; the site's consensus reads: "Mr. Nobody's narrative tangles may bedevil as much as they entertain, but its big ambitions and absorbing visuals make for an intriguing addition to director Jaco Van Dormael's filmography." At Metacritic, which assigns a rating out of 100 to reviews from mainstream critics, the film received a score of 63, based on 10 critics, indicating "generally favorable reviews".

Jennie Punter of The Globe and Mail praised the film:

Van Dormael holds this fractured fairy tale together by giving it an emotional core and delivers two hours of time travel with a playful spirit and at a mostly hyperkinetic pace, sprinkling it with amusing side journeys and sometimes letting a scene unfold at a more natural tempo.

Bruce Kirkland of Jam! gave the film four stars out of five and wrote: "Expect the unexpected. Try to answer the unanswerable question that writer-director Van Dormael poses. It is a worthwhile exercise." He also described Leto's acting as a "marvelously full-blooded, brain-spinning, tour-de-force performance." Ken Eisner from The Georgia Straight summarized the film as "a dazzling feat of philosophical fancy, and it attempts nothing less than the summing up of an entire life, and an epoch or two, with its free-spinning take on recent human history as projected into possible futures."

Niels Matthijs, writing for Twitch Film, stated that "It's astounding how van Dormael turns each scene into a unique little cinematic event. There is hardly filler here, no scenes to drag out the running time or to fill some gaps in between other climaxes. Every scene matters and every scene is made to look like it matters. The director uses all means to his disposal to keep the viewer engaged and interested in the life of the main protagonist, Nemo Nobody." Fred Topel, writing for Screen Junkies, praised the film's artistry, saying: "All of Nemo's lives are painful. No matter what he chooses, he experiences heartbreak, death of loved ones, his own death, and clinical depression. My future seems brighter, but the film makes the strong point that every experience is worthwhile. The goal isn't to choose the easiest path. It's to live." Chris Holt from Starburst magazine wrote that "Mr. Nobody is a film that is remarkable by its very existence and that in itself is something to be happy about. You may love it you may hate it, but you can bet that you will never forget it." Exclaim!'s Robert Bell called the film "a powerful movie about what it means to be alive."

Boyd van Hoeij of Variety magazine was more critical, writing: "Though a lot of it is well written and directed and, quite often, funny or poignant, the individual scenes rarely become part of a larger whole." He praised Leto's acting, stating that "The closest the film comes to having a gravitational center are in the scenes set in 2092. What makes them soar is not the imaginative staging of the future, but Leto's performance. His acting talent really comes into full view in his scenes as the last dying man on Earth." He also praised Regbo and Temple, saying that "Regbo, as the teenage Nemo, and Juno Temple, as the teenage Anna, are impressive, bringing the hormonal battles of adolescence vividly to life." Film critic Eric Lavallée listed Regbo as one of his "Top 10 New Faces & Voices" of the 2009 Toronto International Film Festival, noting that "newbie Toby Regbo might easily be Mr. Nobody's most 'alive' character. Playing Nemo at age 16, the actor is mostly paired with Juno Temple – their unique love story is the film's heart pumping portions and plays a lot better than the artery clogging other brushes of romance."

AlloCiné, a French cinema website, gave the film an average of three out of five stars, based on a survey of 24 reviews. Xavier Leherpeur from Le Nouvel Observateur described it as "a fiction of sterile ramifications, weighed down by a script the labyrinthine constructions of which poorly conceal the poverty of inspiration". Pierre Fornerod from Ouest-France wrote that "Van Dormael plays with chance and coincidence. The demonstration is long and heavy, but aesthetically, is superb."

== Accolades ==
The film and its cast and crew won and were nominated for multiple awards from numerous film festivals and organizations. At the 66th Venice International Film Festival, Sylvie Olivé was awarded the Golden Osella for Outstanding Technical Contribution, and the film received the Biografilm Lancia Award; the film was also nominated for the Golden Lion, which it lost to Lebanon, and Jared Leto was nominated for the Volpi Cup for Best Actor. Christophe Beaucarne received the award for Best Cinematography at the 20th Stockholm International Film Festival, and Kaatje Van Damme won the award for Best Makeup at the 42nd Sitges Film Festival.

At the 1st Magritte Awards, the film was nominated for seven awards and was awarded six: Best Film, Best Director and Best Screenplay for Jaco Van Dormael, Best Cinematography for Christophe Beaucarne, Best Original Score for Pierre Van Dormael, and Best Editing for Matyas Veress; Emmanuel de Boissieu, Frédéric Demolder, and Dominique Warnier lost the award for Best Sound to A Town Called Panic. In addition, the film was awarded the André Cavens Award by the Belgian Film Critics Association as the best film of 2010, and won Best Film at the 2010 Fonske Awards. It also received the People's Choice Award for Best European Film at the 23rd European Film Awards, and won the Audience Award at the Biografilm Festival.

Mr. Nobody appeared on many critics' top ten lists of the greatest films of 2010. Kurt Halfyard, a film critic for Twitch Film, listed the film among the best science fiction films of the 21st century. The American Film Institute listed Mr. Nobody as one of the best European films of 2010.
