= Juliette Van Dormael =

Belgian cinematographer

Juliette Van Dormael (born 22 December 1990 in Brussels) is a Belgian cinematographer. Her mother is Laurette Vankeerberghen and father Jaco Van Dormael. She is known for the feature film "Mon ange" (2016). Earlier she worked with the shorts "Jay parmi les hommes" (2015) and "Mouettes" (2013) among others. She has studied cinematography in INSAS Film School in Brussels between 2008 and 2013.

She has won the "Best Cinematographer's Debut in Camerimage 2016 for "Mon Ange" and has been nominated to the American Society of Cinematographers Awards - ASC "Spotlight Award" 2017 with the same film. She appeared along with her sister Alice Van Dormael in Mr. Nobody, directed by their father Jaco Van Dormael, as the Angels of Oblivian.

She received a Magritte Award nomination in the category of Best Cinematography for her work in Through the Night (2023).
