= L'imitateur =

- Directed by: Jaco Van Dormael
- Release date: 1982
- Running time: 29 minutes
- Country: Belgium
- Language: Swedish

L'imitateur is a 1982 Belgian documentary short film written and directed by Jaco Van Dormael. The short film was shot in 1982 in Belgium. L'imitateur tells the story of two mentally disabled which do a brief intrusion into the world of "normal people". The film was awarded the Best Documentary and Best Short Film at the 1983 Brussels Film Festival. In 2011, it appeared at the Sottodiciotto Filmfestival held in Turin in the retrospective dedicated to Van Dormael.
