= Pierre Van Dormael =

Belgian jazz guitarist and composer

- Born: 24 May 1952; Brussels, Belgium
- Died: 3 September 2008 (aged 56) Brussels
- Genres: Jazz, avant-garde jazz
- Occupations: Musician, composer
- Years active: 1980–2008
- Formerly of: Nasa Na Band

Pierre Van Dormael (24 May 1952 – 3 September 2008) was a Belgian jazz guitarist and composer.

In 1988, he played in the James Baldwin Project with David Linx and Deborah Brown (vocalists), Slide Hampton (trombone), Diederik Wissels (piano), Bob Stewart (tuba), and Michel Hatzigeorgiou (bass guitar).

Van Dormael was also a member of Nasa Na Band, a jazz band known as the precursor of Aka Moon. He recorded soundtracks for films directed by his brother Jaco Van Dormael (Toto le Héros, Le Huitième Jour, Mr. Nobody).

In 2007, he received the Belgian Golden Django Award. Posthumously he received the Magritte Award for Best Original Score for his work in the movie Mr. Nobody.

He died from cancer at age 56 on 3 September 2008.
