= Stade 81 =

- Directed by: Jaco Van Dormael
- Release date: 1981
- Running time: 14 minutes
- Country: Sweden
- Language: Swedish

Stade 81 (also known as Starting Blocks) is a 1981 documentary short film written and directed by Jaco Van Dormael. The short film was shot in 1981 in Sweden, Canada and United Kingdom. Stade 81 is a documentary about the first Special Olympics. The film received various awards, including the Caducee d'Or at the 1982 Rennes International Film Festival. In 2011, it appeared at the Sottodiciotto Filmfestival held in Turin in the retrospective dedicated to Van Dormael.
