= È pericoloso sporgersi (1984 film) =

- Directed by: Jaco Van Dormael
- Cinematography: Walther van den Ende
- Edited by: Susana Rossberg
- Release date: 1984
- Running time: 12 minutes
- Country: Belgium
- Language: French

È pericoloso sporgersi is a 1984 Belgian short film written and directed by Jaco Van Dormael. The short film was shot in 1984 in Belgium. The film starred Mathieu Chemin, Joëlle Waterkeyn and Dirk Pauwels. It was produced by Iblis Films (Brussels). È pericoloso sporgersi tells the story of a child who has been thrust into a position where he must make an impossible decision.

The film won the Grand Prix in international competition at the Clermont-Ferrand International Short Film Festival and received the Audience Award for Best Belgian Short Film at the 1985 Brussels International Fantastic Film Festival. It was also screened at the Osaka European Film Festival in 1985. In 2011, it appeared at the Sottodiciotto Filmfestival held in Turin in the retrospective dedicated to Van Dormael.
