= Institut national supérieur des arts du spectacle et des techniques de diffusion =

Art school in Brussels, Belgium

Institut national supérieur des arts du spectacle et des techniques de diffusion (INSAS)
- Type: Film school Drama school
- Established: 1962
- Director: Laurent Gross
- Location: City of Brussels, Belgium; 50°50′N 4°22′E
- Website: insas.be
- Location within Brussels Location within Belgium

The Institut national supérieur des arts du spectacle et des techniques de diffusion, commonly known by the acronym INSAS (abbreviated as the Institut national supérieur des arts du spectacle), is a Belgian film and drama school founded by Raymond Ravar, André Delvaux, Paul Anrieu, and Jean Brismée in 1962.

== Notable alumni ==
- Fabrice Du Welz
- Virginie Efira
- Philippe Grandrieux
- Carole Laganière
- Bruno Nuytten
- Susana Rossberg
- Michel Khleifi
