= Jaco Van Dormael =

Belgian director and writer (born 1957)

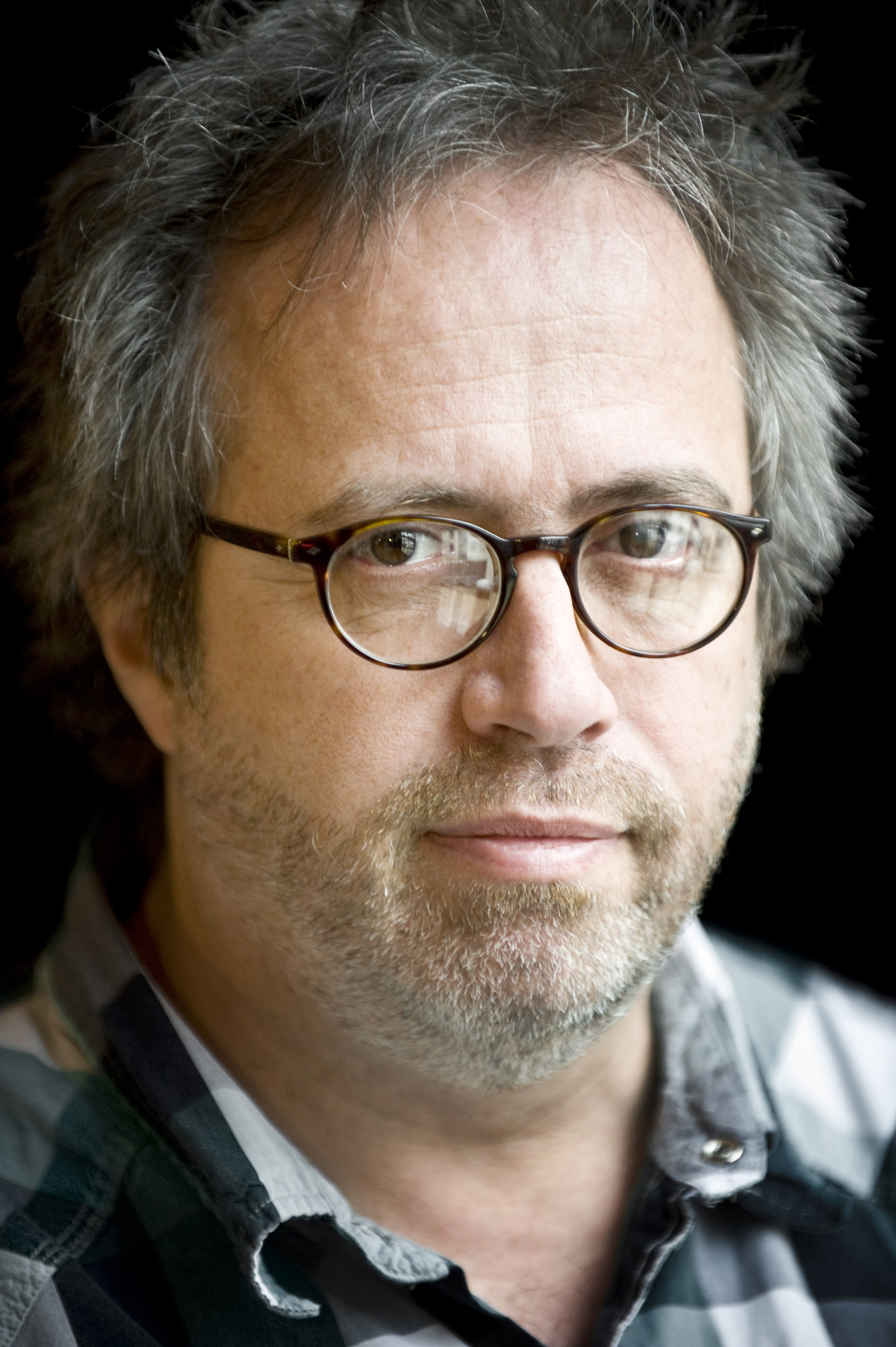
- Van Dormael in 2011
- Born: Jaco Van Dormael; 9 February 1957 (age 69); Ixelles, Belgium
- Education: Institut supérieur des arts
- Occupations: Film director; screenwriter; playwright
- Years active: 1980–present
- Partner: Michèle Anne De Mey (2000–present)
- Children: 2, including Juliette
- Relatives: Pierre Van Dormael (brother)

Jaco Van Dormael (born 9 February 1957) is a Belgian film director, screenwriter and playwright. Regarded as one of the most distinctive voices in contemporary European cinema, he is known for his narrative experimentation, blending elements of realism and fantasy while exploring the human condition. (Note: Attributed to multiple sources:)

Van Dormael spent his childhood travelling around Europe, before going on to study filmmaking at the Institut supérieur des arts in Brussels. After receiving a Student Academy Award for the short film Maedeli the Breach (1981), he made his feature-length debut with Toto the Hero (1991), which won the Caméra d'Or at Cannes. His next film, The Eighth Day (1996), garnered box office success and broadened his international profile. He further consolidated his status with the science fiction drama Mr. Nobody (2009), his first English-language film, and the satirical fantasy The Brand New Testament (2015), both of which earned him Magritte Awards for Best Director.

In addition to his work in cinema, Van Dormael has been active in theatre with his long-time partner Michèle Anne De Mey, combining live performance with visual storytelling techniques similar to his films. He frequently collaborated with his late brother Pierre Van Dormael, who scored several of his films.

== Early life ==
Jaco Van Dormael was born on 9 February 1957 in Ixelles, Belgium. He spent part of his childhood in Germany, where he was raised until the age of seven, when his family returned to Belgium. At birth, he was nearly strangled by the umbilical cord and reportedly suffered from a lack of oxygen, leading doctors to fear possible mental impairment. Although he did not experience lasting effects, the incident has been cited in connection with the later thematic focus of his films on characters with physical or mental disabilities.

Beginning in 1975, he worked as a circus clown and later directed children's theatre productions with a number of companies, including Galafronie, Isocèle and Guimbarde. His theatre work, which took him to various European countries, contributed to his decision to study cinematography at the École nationale supérieure Louis-Lumière in Paris and film directing at the Institut national supérieur des arts du spectacle (INSAS) in Brussels. His early involvement in children's entertainment has been noted as influencing the recurring focus on childhood and innocence in his later work.

== Career ==
=== 1980–1989: Early work ===
While a student at INSAS in Brussels, Van Dormael wrote and directed Maedeli the Breach (1980), a fiction short produced by the school. The film depicts the parallel coming-of-age stories of a boy discovering rural life after being sent to live with a relative and a girl who dreams of being a boy. Structured as a narrative told in flashback from an old photograph, it was awarded Best Foreign Student Film at the 1981 Student Academy Awards. Pierre Van Dormael, the director's brother, provided the film's original score.

The short films that followed included both documentary and fiction works, such as Stade 81 (1981), which focuses on the Paralympic Games, and L'imitateur (1982), which follows two individuals with intellectual disabilities wandering around and unsettling the people they encountered. Among these early works, È pericoloso sporgersi (1984) achieved particular recognition, winning the Grand Prix at the 1985 Clermont-Ferrand International Short Film Festival. Its title alludes to the safety warnings on Italian trains and introduces the film's setting in a railway station, where a child is confronted with two possible paths for his future.

=== 1990–2000: Mainstream breakthrough ===
Van Dormael made his feature-length debut in 1991 with Toto the Hero, a tale about a man who believes his life was stolen from him when he was switched at birth. The story unfolds through a complex mosaic of flashbacks, fantasies and dream sequences, at times adopting a stream-of-consciousness structure. Production of Toto the Hero took approximately ten years, with Van Dormael rewriting the script multiple times and producers raising the budget through Belgian, French and German public funding sources. The film premiered at the 1991 Cannes Film Festival, where it won the Caméra d'Or. Critics highlighted its innovative narrative structure, which combines humour with themes of identity, childhood and the passage of time. It went on to win five Joseph Plateau Awards, including Best Film and Best Director for Van Dormael, four European Film Awards, the André Cavens Award, the César Award for Best Foreign Film, and also received a BAFTA Award nomination. The film brought Van Dormael international recognition as both a writer and director, with The New York Times describing him as "a bright new talent to celebrate."

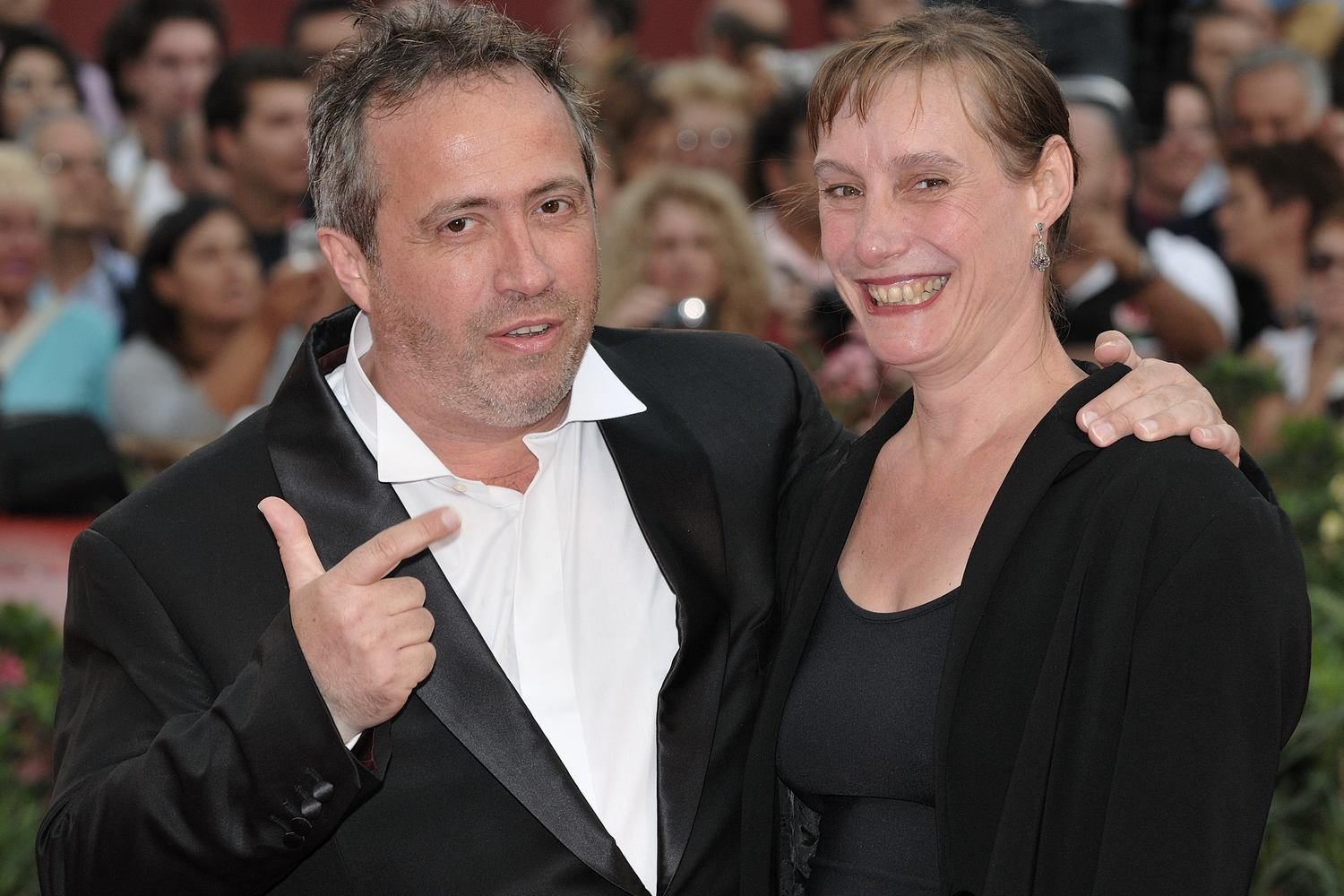
Van Dormael and his partner Michèle Anne De Mey

Van Dormael then participated in Lumière and Company (1995), a collective film project created to mark the centenary of cinema and presented at the 46th Berlin International Film Festival. The film brought together forty-one directors, each invited to shoot a short piece using the same type of camera employed by Auguste and Louis Lumière, without synchronized sound and in no more than three takes. Van Dormael's 52-second contribution, The Kiss, featured Pascal Duquenne, who had previously appeared in Toto the Hero.

Van Dormael's second feature, The Eighth Day (1996), marked a shift toward a more linear narrative structure compared with Toto the Hero. The film centres on the friendship between Harry, an unhappy and recently separated businessman portrayed by Daniel Auteuil, and Georges, a man with Down syndrome played by Pascal Duquenne, thereby consolidating Van Dormael's collaboration with Duquenne after their earlier work together. Van Dormael developed the screenplay with the intention of building the film around a man with Down syndrome and exploring the coexistence of two parallel social worlds, one conventional and the other marginalised. The Eighth Day premiered at the 1996 Cannes Film Festival, where it was nominated for the Palme d'Or. Auteuil and Duquenne jointly received the Best Actor Award, marking the first time in the festival's history that two actors had shared the prize. The film received four Joseph Plateau Awards and was nominated for a César Award and a Golden Globe Award. Produced on a budget of $5 million, it grossed $33 million worldwide, making it the highest-grossing film of the year from Belgium.

Following The Eighth Day, Van Dormael did not direct another feature film for over a decade. He served as a member of the jury at the 1998 Cannes Film Festival before returning to theatre to direct Couldn't We Love Each Other a Little?, which premiered at the Théâtre des Riches-Claires in Brussels in December 2000. The play toured internationally for several years and was widely praised for its blend of dark humor, burlesque scenes, and the exploration of love and human connection.

=== 2001–present: Prominence ===
Van Dormael began developing Mr. Nobody in 2001, working for six years on a screenplay that combined speculative science, experimental cinema, and motifs of human emotion. It became his first English-language feature due to its settings in Canada and England and was financed by a number of international companies. The film stars Jared Leto as Nemo Nobody, the last mortal on Earth after humanity has achieved quasi-immortality. As a 117-year-old man reflecting on his life, Nemo recounts alternative versions of his past, exploring the impact of key decisions through a nonlinear narrative that incorporates the multiverse hypothesis. Mr. Nobody premiered at the 2009 Venice Film Festival, where it won the Golden Osella. Creative disagreements between the director and studio executives over the film's running time limited its theatrical release to selected territories, while its wider availability on streaming helped establish Mr. Nobody as a cult classic. Chris Holt from Starburst magazine called it "remarkable by its very existence", observing that it "manages to be both small and heartfelt as well as having epic, brilliantly conceived science fiction". At the 2010 Magritte Awards, it received a leading seven nominations and won six, including Best Film, Best Director and Best Screenplay for Van Dormael.

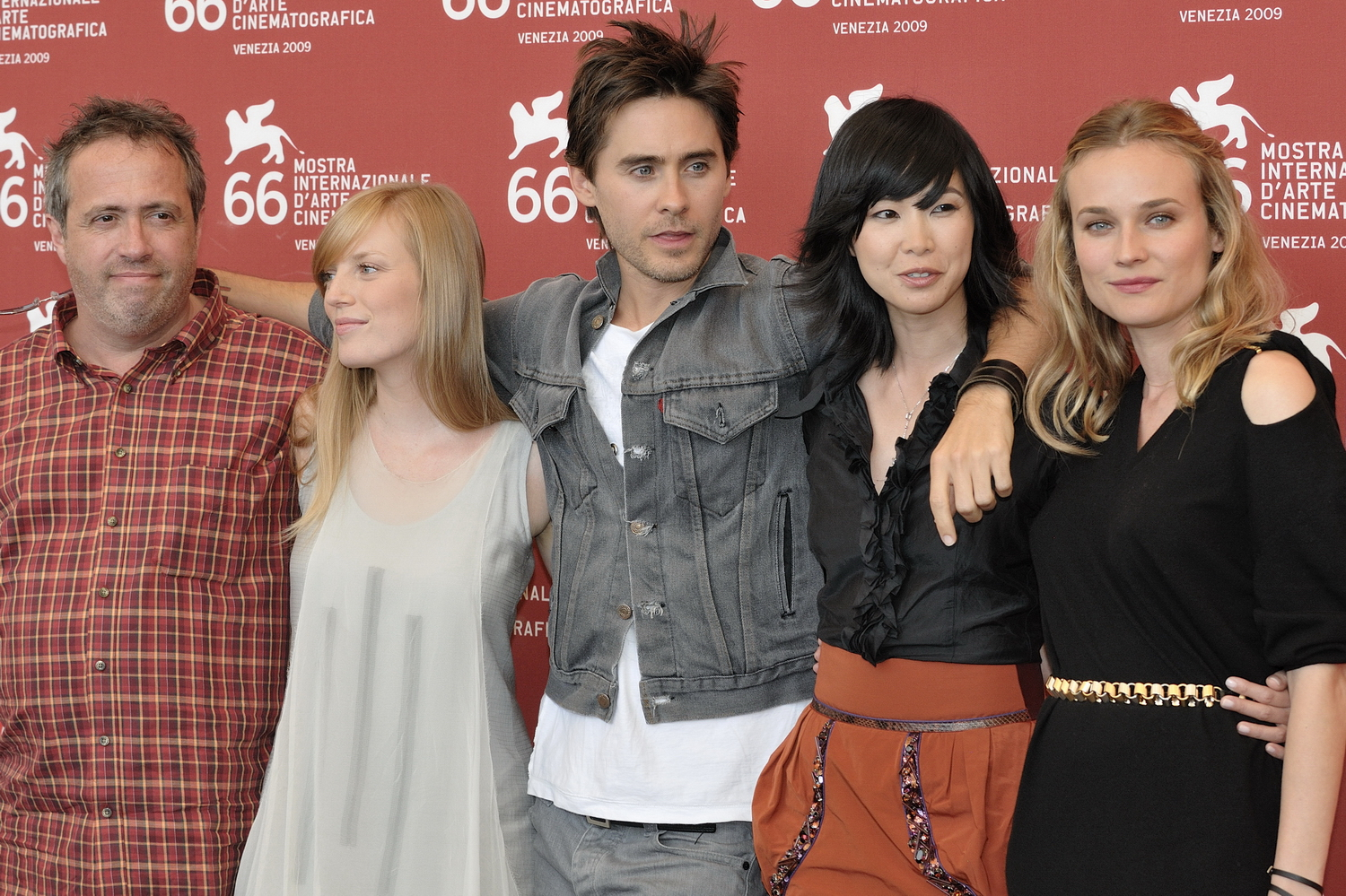
Van Dormael (left) with the cast of Mr. Nobody at the 2009 Venice Film Festival

After navigating the complex and demanding production of Mr. Nobody, Van Dormael chose to return to theatre for its more direct and flexible approach to creation. In collaboration with his long-time partner and choreographer Michèle Anne De Mey, he created and directed Kiss & Cry (2011), with a text by Thomas Gunzig. The production took a minimal approach, relying on essential elements such as live dance, real-time film projections, and miniature sets to create a hybrid form blending theatre and cinema. It was presented internationally, with performances at the Théâtre du Rond-Point in Paris and the Cutler Majestic Theatre in Boston, reaching an estimated audience of 180,000.

Van Dormael subsequently rejoined Thomas Gunzig for his next feature film, The Brand New Testament (2015), offering a satirical reinterpretation of Christian mythology. The film portrays God as a despotic figure living anonymously in Brussels, whose daughter Ea rebels against him by revealing the dates of death of every human being and setting out to compose a new testament, proposing an alternative narrative centered on empathy and human agency rather than divine authority. Starring Benoît Poelvoorde as God, alongside Catherine Deneuve and Yolande Moreau, The Brand New Testament premiered at the 2015 Cannes Film Festival to critical acclaim. Writing for the Los Angeles Times, Justin Chang described it as "a clever exercise in gently heretical whimsy". It brought Van Dormael nominations for the Golden Globe Award and the Satellite Award for Best Foreign Language Film, and two Magritte Awards for Best Director and Best Screenplay.

Van Dormael continued his exploration of hybrid theatre with two subsequent stage works in collaboration with Michèle Anne De Mey: Cold Blood (2016) and Amor (2017). His experimentation with other forms of visual storytelling led him to co-write the Blake and Mortimer comic album The Last Pharaoh (2019) with Gunzig. Van Dormael was invited to join the project by François Schuiten, the album's illustrator, who had previously collaborated with him on the futuristic designs in Mr. Nobody. Writing for Le Figaro, Olivier Delcroix described it as "a major, expansive and accomplished comic", noting that it "successfully capturing the spirit of the original series".

== Style and themes ==
Jaco Van Dormael's work is largely associated with a visual and narrative style that combines formal experimentation and coming-of-age storytelling. Critics described his films as having fragmented structures, nonlinear timelines, and subjective points of view as recurring narrative features. Film scholar Lequanne Collins-Bacchus characterized his cinema as an exploration of memory and alternative realities, emphasizing the tension between determinism and contingency.

A recurring thematic concern in Van Dormael's films is the construction of identity through themes of memory, imagination, and chance. In The Eighth Day, disability is framed not as a social problem but as a perspective that reshapes the viewer's understanding of normality and human connection. Similarly, Mr. Nobody develops multiple hypothetical life paths from a single decision point, with Screen Rant calling it an "attempt to capture the strangeness of existence in a single film". In a separate analysis, Logan Finney interpreted the film's complex structure and visual design as reflecting contemporary anxieties regarding freedom and self-determination in late modern societies.

Critics also commented on Van Dormael's visual style, particularly his use of colour palettes and production design. His collaboration with comics artist and production designer François Schuiten on Toto the Hero and Mr. Nobody was associated with a retrofuturist aesthetic, which several commentators interpreted as reinforcing the films' speculative structure. In The Brand New Testament, Van Dormael extended these themes into overt satire. The film depicts God as a tyrannical figure living in contemporary Brussels and reworks theological narratives through absurdist humor. Writing for the Variety, Peter Debruge described it as an "ontological satire that puts a cartoonish spin" on Christianity.

Across cinema and theatre, Van Dormael also explored hybrid forms that combine live performance and film techniques. Productions such as Kiss & Cry and Cold Blood incorporate miniature sets, hand choreography, and real-time film projection. Scholars of contemporary performance cited these works as an example of intermedial theatre.

== Filmography ==
- Toto the Hero (1991)
- The Eighth Day (1996)
- Mr. Nobody (2009)
- The Brand New Testament (2015)

== Recognition ==
Although limited in number, Van Dormael's films have garnered a cult following, as well as critical and commercial success. Following the release of Toto the Hero, he was praised as an enfant prodige. Three of his four feature films were awarded the André Cavens Award for Best Film by the Belgian Film Critics Association. He is the only filmmaker to have won the principal Magritte Awards—Best Film, Best Director and Best Screenplay—twice, for Mr. Nobody and The Brand New Testament. He is also a two-time recipient of the Joseph Plateau Award for Best Director, for Toto the Hero and The Eighth Day. According to the Centre du Cinéma et de l'Audiovisuel, his films contributed to increased audience attendance for productions from Belgium.

In 2015, Van Dormael was included in Le Soir's list of the 100 most influential people. He was awarded an honorary doctorate by the Université libre de Bruxelles in March 2016 and received a star on the Ostend Walk of Fame later that year for his contributions to the Belgian film industry. His film Mr. Nobody, often regarded as his magnum opus, was cited as one of the greatest science fiction films of the 21st century. Film critic Nicolas Crousse described it as "a prodigiously audacious work" that has become "part of our artistic heritage". Since 2010, he has been honorary president of the Association of Francophone Film Directors (ARRF), succeeding André Delvaux.
