= 23rd Lumière Awards =

2018 French film awards ceremony

- Official poster
- Date: 5 February 2018
- Site: Paris, France
- Hosted by: Laurie Cholewa; Pierre Zeni

Highlights
- Best Film: BPM (Beats per Minute)
- Best Director: Robin Campillo
- Best Actor: Nahuel Pérez Biscayart
- Best Actress: Jeanne Balibar
- Most awards: BPM (Beats Per Minute) (6)
- Most nominations: BPM (Beats Per Minute) (6)

The 23rd Lumière Awards ceremony, presented by the Académie des Lumières, took place on 5 February 2018 to honour the best in French films of 2017. The nominations were announced on 11 December 2017.

== Winners and nominees ==
Best Film BPM (Beats per Minute) — Robin Campillo: See You Up There - Albert Dupontel; Barbara - Mathieu Amalric; Félicité - Alain Gomis; Orphan - Arnaud des Pallières; C'est la vie! - Éric Toledano and Olivier Nakache	Best Director Robin Campillo — BPM (Beats per Minute): Mathieu Amalric — Barbara; Laurent Cantet — The Workshop; Philippe Garrel — Lover for a Day; Alain Gomis — Félicité; Michel Hazanavicius — Redoubtable
Best Actor Nahuel Pérez Biscayart — BPM (Beats per Minute): Swann Arlaud — Bloody Milk; Daniel Auteuil — Le Brio; Jean-Pierre Bacri — C'est la vie!; Louis Garrel — Redoubtable; Reda Kateb — Django	Best Actress Jeanne Balibar — Barbara: Hiam Abbass — Insyriated; Juliette Binoche — Let the Sunshine In; Emmanuelle Devos — Number One; Charlotte Gainsbourg — Promise at Dawn; Karin Viard — Jalouse
Best Male Revelation Arnaud Valois — BPM (Beats per Minute): Khaled Alouach — De toutes mes forces; Matthieu Lucci — The Workshop; Nekfeu — All That Divides Us; Finnegan Oldfield — Reinventing Marvin; Pablo Pauly — Patients	Best Female Revelation Laetitia Dosch — Montparnasse Bienvenue: Iris Bry — The Guardians; Eye Haïdara — C'est la vie!; Camélia Jordana — Le Brio; Pamela Ramos — All the Dreams in the World; Solène Rigot — Orphan
Best First Film Until the Birds Return - Karim Moussaoui: Les Bienheureux - Sofia Djama; Raw - Julia Ducournau; Montparnasse Bienvenue - Léonor Serraille; Patients - Grand Corps Malade and Mehdi Idir; Bloody Milk - Hubert Charuel	Best Screenplay BPM (Beats per Minute) — Robin Campillo and Philippe Mangeot: Orphan — Christelle Berthevas and Arnaud des Pallières; See You Up There — Albert Dupontel and Pierre Lemaitre; Until the Birds Return — Karim Moussaoui and Maud Ameline; C'est la vie! — Éric Toledano and Olivier Nakache
Best Cinematography Christophe Beaucarne — Barbara: Céline Bozon — Félicité; Caroline Champetier — The Guardians; Alain Duplantier — The Sower; Irina Lubtchansky — Ismael's Ghosts; Vincent Mathias — See You Up There	Best Music Arnaud Rebotini — BPM (Beats per Minute): Gaspar Claus — Makala; Angelo Foley and Grand Corps Malade — Patients; Grégoire Hetzel — Ismael's Ghosts; Igorrr — Jeannette: The Childhood of Joan of Arc; Philippe Rombi — L'Amant double
Best Documentary Faces Places - Agnès Varda and JR: Lumière! - Thierry Frémaux; Makala - Emmanuel Gras; No Farewells - Christophe Agou; Plot 35 - Éric Caravaca; The Venerable W. - Barbet Schroeder	Best Animated Film The Big Bad Fox and Other Tales... - Benjamin Renner and Patrick Imbert: Tall Tales from the Magical Garden of Antoon Krings - Antoon Krings and Arnaud Bouron; Zombillenium - Arthur de Pins and Alexis Ducord
Best French-Language Film Insyriated - Philippe Van Leeuw: Before Summer Ends - Maryam Goormaghtigh; Beauty and the Dogs - Kaouther Ben Hania; A Wedding - Stephan Streker; Lost in Paris - Dominique Abel and Fiona Gordon	
Honorary Lumières Jean-Paul Belmondo; Monica Bellucci

== See also ==
- 43rd César Awards
- 8th Magritte Awards
