= 43rd César Awards =

2018 French film awards ceremony

- Official poster featuring a photo of actress, Jeanne Moreau, taken during filming of The Bride Wore Black (1968) by Marilù Parolini
- Date: 2 March 2018
- Site: Salle Pleyel, Paris
- Hosted by: Manu Payet

Highlights
- Best Film: BPM (Beats per Minute)
- Best Actor: Swann Arlaud; Bloody Milk
- Best Actress: Jeanne Balibar; Barbara
- Most awards: BPM (Beats per Minute) (6)
- Most nominations: BPM (Beats per Minute) (13); See You Up There (13)

Television coverage
- Network: Canal+

The 43rd César Awards ceremony, presented by the Académie des Arts et Techniques du Cinéma, took place on 2 March 2018, at the Salle Pleyel in Paris to honour the best French films of 2017.

== Winners and nominees ==
Best Film (presented by Vanessa Paradis) BPM (Beats per Minute): Barbara; Bloody Milk; Le Brio; Patients; C'est la vie!; See You Up There	Best Director (presented by Dany Boon) Albert Dupontel - See You Up There: Robin Campillo - BPM (Beats per Minute); Mathieu Amalric - Barbara; Julia Ducournau - Raw; Hubert Charuel - Bloody Milk; Michel Hazanavicius - Redoutable; Eric Toledano, Olivier Nakache - C'est la vie!
Best Actor (presented by Isabelle Huppert) Swann Arlaud - Bloody Milk: Daniel Auteuil - Le Brio; Jean-Pierre Bacri - C'est la Vie!; Guillaume Canet - Rock'n Roll; Albert Dupontel - See You Up There; Louis Garrel - Redoutable; Reda Kateb - Django	Best Actress (presented by Lambert Wilson) Jeanne Balibar - Barbara: Juliette Binoche - Let the Sun Shine In; Emmanuelle Devos - Number One; Marina Foïs - The Workshop; Charlotte Gainsbourg - Promise at Dawn; Doria Tillier - M. & Mme. Adelman; Karin Viard - Jalouse
Best Supporting Actor (presented by Laurence Arné and François-Xavier Demaison) Antoine Reinartz – BPM (Beats per Minute): Niels Arestrup – See You Up There; Laurent Lafitte – See You Up There; Gilles Lellouche – C'est la vie!; Vincent Macaigne – C'est la vie!	Best Supporting Actress (presented by Laura Smet) Sara Giraudeau - Bloody Milk: Laure Calamy - Ava; Anaïs Demoustier - The House by the Sea; Adèle Haenel - BPM (Beats per Minute); Mélanie Thierry - See You Up There
Most Promising Actor (presented by Juliette Binoche) Nahuel Pérez Biscayart – BPM (Beats per Minute): Benjamin Lavernhe – C'est la vie!; Finnegan Oldfield – Reinventing Marvin; Pablo Pauly – Patients; Arnaud Valois – BPM (Beats per Minute)	Most Promising Actress (presented by Blanche Gardin) Camélia Jordana – Le Brio: Iris Bry – The Guardians; Laetitia Dosch – Montparnasse Bienvenue; Eye Haïdara – C'est la vie!; Garance Marillier – Raw
Best Original Screenplay (presented by Noomi Rapace and Lucien Jean-Baptiste) BPM (Beats per Minute) – Robin Campillo: Barbara – Mathieu Amalric & Philippe Di Folco; Raw – Julia Ducournau; Bloody Milk – Hubert Charuel & Claude Le Pape; C'est la vie! – Éric Toledano and Olivier Nakache	Best Adaptation (presented by Stéphane De Groodt and Olga Kurylenko) See You Up There – Albert Dupontel & Pierre Lemaitre: The Guardians – Xavier Beauvois, Frédérique Moreau & Marie-Julie Maille; Patients – Grand Corps Malade & Fadette Drouard; Promise at Dawn – Éric Barbier & Marie Eynard; Redoubtable – Michel Hazanavicius
Best First Feature Film (presented by Golshifteh Farahani) Bloody Milk – Hubert Charuel: Raw – Julia Ducournau; Montparnasse Bienvenue – Léonor Sérraille; Mr & Mme Adelman – Nicolas Bedos; Patients – Grand Corps Malade	Best Cinematography (presented by Alice Belaïdi and Arié Elmaleh) See You Up There – Vincent Mathias: BPM (Beats per Minute) – Jeanne Lapoirie; Barbara – Christophe Beaucarne; The Guardians – Caroline Champetier; Redoubtable – Guillaume Schiffman
Best Editing (presented by Pascal Elbé and Vincent Elbaz) BPM (Beats per Minute) – Robin Campillo: See You Up There – Christophe Pinel; Barbara – François Gédigier; Bloody Milk – Julie Lena, Lilian Corbeille & Grégoire Pontécaille; C'est la vie! – Dorian Rigal-Ansous	Best Sound (presented by Alice Belaïdi and Arié Elmaleh) Barbara – Olivier Mauvezin, Nicolas Moreau & Stéphane Thiébaut: BPM (Beats per Minute) – Julien Sicart, Valérie Deloof & Jean-Pierre Laforce; See You Up There – Jean Minondo, Gurwal Coïc-Gallas, Cyril Holtz & Damien Lazzerini; Raw – Mathieu Descamps, Séverin Favriau & Stéphane Thiébaut; C'est la vie! – Pascal Armant, Sélim Azzazi & Jean-Paul Hurier
Best Original Music (presented by Eddy Mitchell) BPM (Beats per Minute) – Arnaud Rebotini: See You Up There – Christophe Julien; Raw – Jim Williams; Bloody Milk – Myd; Faces Places – Matthieu Chedid	Best Costume Design (presented by Aure Atika) See You Up There – Mimi Lempicka: BPM (Beats per Minute) – Isabelle Pannetier; Barbara – Pascaline Chavanne; The Guardians – Anaïs Romand; Promise at Dawn – Catherine Bouchard
Best Production Design (presented by Pascal Elbé and Vincent Elbaz) See You Up There - Pierre Quefféléan: BPM (Beats per Minute) - Emmanuelle Duplay; Barbara - Laurent Baude; Promise at Dawn - Pierre Renson; Redoubtable - Christian Marti	Best Documentary Film (presented by Elsa Zylberstein) I Am Not Your Negro: 12 Jours; A voix haute - La force de la parole; Carré 35; Faces Places
Best Animated Feature Film (presented by Manu Payet) The Big Bad Fox and Other Tales...: Sahara; Zombillenium	Best Animated Short Film (presented by Manu Payet) Pépé le morse: Le Futur sera chauve; I Want Pluto to be a Planet Again; Le Jardin de minuit
Best Short Film (presented by Géraldine Nakache) Les Bigorneaux: Le Bleu blanc rouge de mes cheveux; About Kings: Easy Rider; Marlon; Les Misérables	Best Foreign Film (presented by Sophie Marceau and Pierre Richard) Loveless (Russia): The Nile Hilton Incident (Sweden / Denmark / Germany); Dunkirk (UK / USA / France / Netherlands); La La Land (USA); The Square (Sweden / Germany / France / Denmark); A Wedding (Belgium / France / Luxembourg / Pakistan)
Audience Award (presented by Line Renaud) Raid dingue - Dany Boon
Honorary César (presented by Marion Cotillard and Pedro Almodóvar) Penélope Cruz

== See also ==
- 23rd Lumière Awards
- 8th Magritte Awards
- 30th European Film Awards
- 90th Academy Awards
- 71st British Academy Film Awards
- 63rd David di Donatello
- 33rd Goya Awards
