= List of French submissions for the Academy Award for Best International Feature Film =

Best International Feature Film submissions from France

Highlights
- Debut: 1948
- Submissions: 74
- Nominations: 43
- Oscar winners: 12

France has submitted films for the Academy Award for Best International Feature Film (Note: The category was previously named the Academy Award for Best Foreign Language Film, but this was changed to the Academy Award for Best International Feature Film in April 2019, after the Academy deemed the word "Foreign" to be outdated.) since the conception of the award in 1956. France has been one of the most successful countries in the world in this category, and more than half of their Oscar submissions have achieved Oscar nominations. The award is handed out annually by the United States Academy of Motion Picture Arts and Sciences to a feature-length motion picture produced outside the United States that contains primarily non-English dialogue. The Academy Award for Best Foreign Language Film was not created until 1956 Academy Awards; however, between 1947 and 1955, the Academy presented Honorary Awards to the best foreign language films released in the United States. These awards were not competitive, as there were no nominees but simply a winner every year that was voted on by the Board of Governors of the Academy. Three French films received Honorary Awards during this period.

As of 2026, France received forty-three nominations, winning twelve awards, being the country with the most nominations and the second most wins, only behind Italy (fourteen wins). Its most recent win was Indochine (1992).

France is also the only country that has submitted a film every year since the creation of the award in 1956, and the only country which has been nominated at more than half of the occasions where the award was given.

== Submissions ==
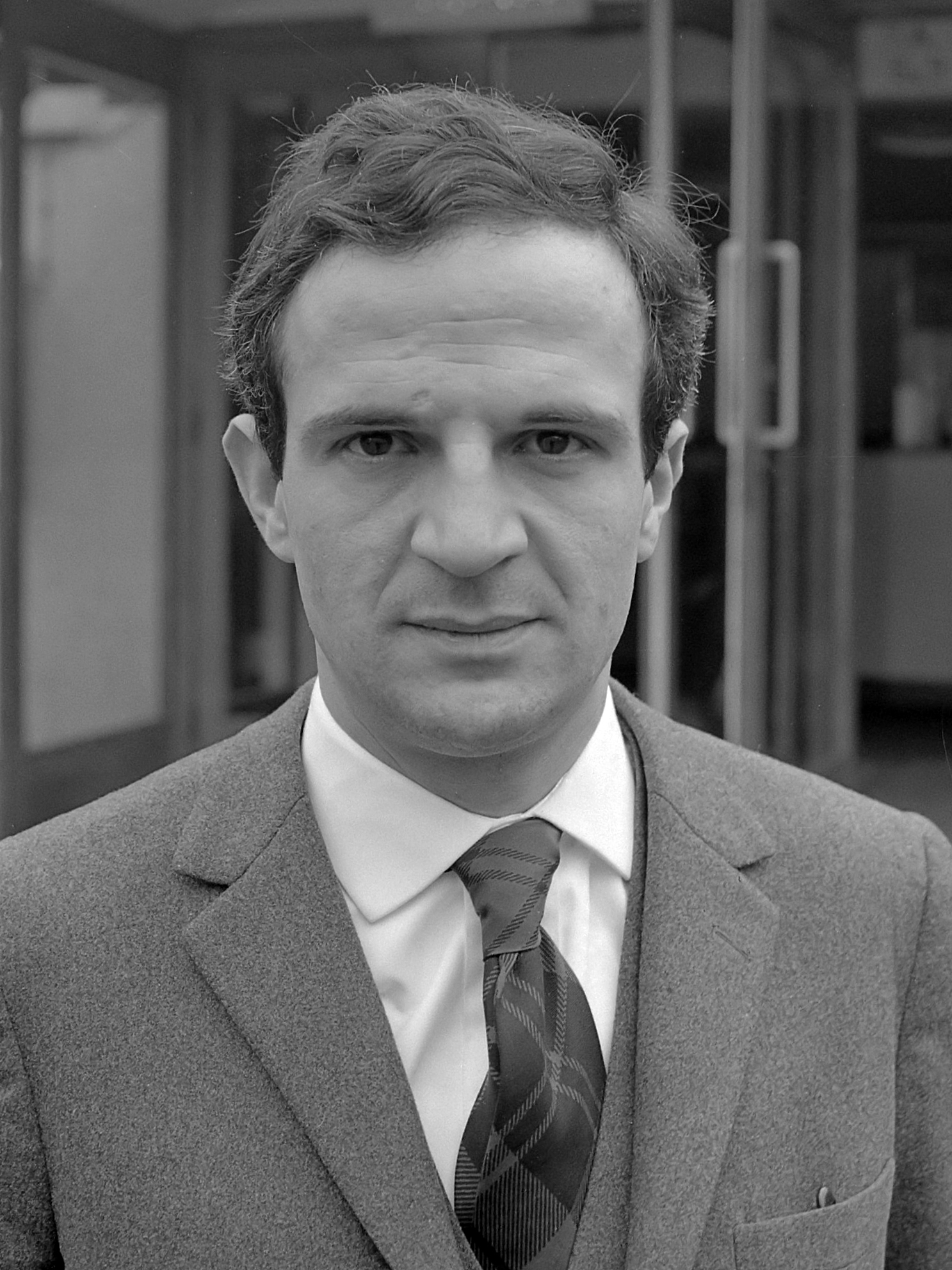
Nouvelle Vague master François Truffaut won for his comedy-drama film Day for Night (1974).

The Academy of Motion Picture Arts and Sciences has invited the film industries of various countries to submit their best film for the Academy Award for Best International Feature Film since 1956. The International Feature Film Committee oversees the process and reviews all the submitted films. Following this, they vote via secret ballot to determine the five nominees for the award. Before the award was created, the Board of Governors of the Academy voted on a film every year that was considered the best foreign-language film released in the United States, and there were no submissions.

The French submission is decided annually by the Centre national de la cinématographie, affiliated with the French Ministry of Culture.

Many French legendary filmmakers represented the country and achieved nominations or wins, including: René Clément, René Clair, Jacques Tati, Marcel Camus, Jacques Demy, François Truffaut, Éric Rohmer, and Louis Malle. While some others although submitted were not nominated, including: Alain Resnais, Jean-Luc Godard, Marguerite Duras, and Maurice Pialat.

Three French films received the Honorary Award for Best Foreign Language Film released in the United States: Monsieur Vincent (1948), The Walls of Malapaga (1950), and Forbidden Games (1952).

French competitive winning films include: Mon Oncle (1958), Black Orpheus (1959), Sundays and Cybèle (1962), A Man and a Woman (1966), The Discreet Charm of the Bourgeoisie (1972), Day for Night (1974), Madame Rosa (1977), Get Out Your Handkerchiefs (1978), and Indochine (1992).

Avenue Montaigne (2006), The Intouchables (2012), Two of Us (2020), Saint Omer (2022), and The Taste of Things (2023), all advanced to the December shortlists, but were not nominated.

Most of the films submitted are primarily in French, with the notable exceptions of the 1959's winner Black Orpheus, which was a co-production with Brazil and shot in Brazilian Portuguese; Mustang nominated in 2015, which was shot in Turkish; Emilia Pérez nominated in 2024, which was shot in Spanish and English; It Was Just an Accident nominated in 2025, which was shot in Persian; and Minotaur submitted in 2026, which was shot in Russian.

Below is a list of the films that have been submitted by France for review by the Academy.

Year (Ceremony)	Film title used in nomination	Original title	Director(s)	Result
1948 (21st)	Monsieur Vincent		Maurice Cloche	Won Honorary Award
1950 (23rd)	The Walls of Malapaga	Au-delà des grilles	René Clément	Won Honorary Award
1952 (25th)	Forbidden Games	Jeux interdits	René Clément	Won Honorary Award
1956 (29th)	Gervaise		René Clément	Nominated
1957 (30th)	Gates of Paris	Porte des Lilas	René Clair	Nominated
1958 (31st)	My Uncle	Mon Oncle	Jacques Tati	Won Academy Award
1959 (32nd)	Black Orpheus	Orfeu Negro	Marcel Camus	Won Academy Award
1960 (33rd)	La Vérité		Henri-Georges Clouzot	Nominated
1961 (34th)	Last Year at Marienbad	L'année dernière à Marienbad	Alain Resnais	Not nominated
1962 (35th)	Sundays and Cybèle	Les dimanches de ville d'Avray	Serge Bourguignon	Won Academy Award
1963 (36th)	The Fire Within	Le feu follet	Louis Malle	Not nominated
1964 (37th)	The Umbrellas of Cherbourg	Les Parapluies de Cherbourg	Jacques Demy	Nominated
1965 (38th)	Pierrot le Fou		Jean-Luc Godard	Not nominated
1966 (39th)	A Man and a Woman	Un homme et une femme	Claude Lelouch	Won Academy Award
1967 (40th)	Live for Life	Vivre Pour Vivre	Claude Lelouch	Nominated
1968 (41st)	Stolen Kisses	Baisers volés	François Truffaut	Nominated
1969 (42nd)	My Night with Maud	Ma nuit chez Maud	Éric Rohmer	Nominated
1970 (43rd)	Hoa-Binh		Raoul Coutard	Nominated
1971 (44th)	Ramparts of Clay	Remparts d'argile	Jean-Louis Bertuccelli	Not nominated
1972 (45th)	The Discreet Charm of the Bourgeoisie	Le Charme discret de la bourgeoisie	Luis Buñuel	Won Academy Award
1973 (46th)	Day for Night	La Nuit américaine	François Truffaut	Won Academy Award
1974 (47th)	Lacombe, Lucien		Louis Malle	Nominated
1975 (48th)	India Song		Marguerite Duras	Not nominated
1976 (49th)	Cousin Cousine		Jean-Charles Tacchella	Nominated
1977 (50th)	Madame Rosa	La Vie devant soi	Moshé Mizrahi	Won Academy Award
1978 (51st)	Get Out Your Handkerchiefs	Préparez vos mouchoirs	Bertrand Blier	Won Academy Award
1979 (52nd)	A Simple Story	Une histoire simple	Claude Sautet	Nominated
1980 (53rd)	The Last Metro	Le Dernier Métro	François Truffaut	Nominated
1981 (54th)	Diva		Jean-Jacques Beineix	Not nominated
1982 (55th)	Coup de Torchon		Bertrand Tavernier	Nominated
1983 (56th)	Entre Nous	Coup de foudre	Diane Kurys	Nominated
1984 (57th)	So Long, Stooge	Tchao Pantin	Claude Berri	Not nominated
1985 (58th)	Three Men and a Cradle	Trois hommes et un couffin	Coline Serreau	Nominated
1986 (59th)	Betty Blue	37°2 le matin	Jean-Jacques Beineix	Nominated
1987 (60th)	Au revoir les enfants		Louis Malle	Nominated
1988 (61st)	The Reader	La Lectrice	Michel Deville	Not nominated
1989 (62nd)	Camille Claudel		Bruno Nuytten	Nominated
1990 (63rd)	Cyrano de Bergerac		Jean-Paul Rappeneau	Nominated
1991 (64th)	Van Gogh		Maurice Pialat	Not nominated
1992 (65th)	Indochine		Régis Wargnier	Won Academy Award
1993 (66th)	Germinal		Claude Berri	Not nominated
1994 (67th)	Wild Reeds	Les roseaux sauvages	André Téchiné	Not nominated
1995 (68th)	French Twist	Gazon maudit	Josiane Balasko	Not nominated
1996 (69th)	Ridicule		Patrice Leconte	Nominated
1997 (70th)	Western		Manuel Poirier	Not nominated
1998 (71st)	The Dreamlife of Angels	La vie rêvée des anges	Erick Zonca	Not nominated
1999 (72nd)	East/West	Est-Ouest / Восток-Запад	Régis Wargnier	Nominated
2000 (73rd)	The Taste of Others	Le goût des autres	Agnès Jaoui	Nominated
2001 (74th)	Amélie	Le Fabuleux Destin d'Amélie Poulain	Jean-Pierre Jeunet	Nominated
2002 (75th)	8 Women	8 femmes	François Ozon	Not nominated
2003 (76th)	Bon Voyage		Jean-Paul Rappeneau	Not nominated
2004 (77th)	The Chorus	Les Choristes	Christophe Barratier	Nominated
2005 (78th)	Joyeux Noël		Christian Carion	Nominated
2006 (79th)	Avenue Montaigne	Fauteuils d'orchestre	Danièle Thompson	Made shortlist
2007 (80th)	Persepolis (Note: Persepolis was not nominated for Best Foreign Language Film, but was nominated for Best Animated Feature.)		Vincent Paronnaud and Marjane Satrapi	Not nominated
2008 (81st)	The Class	Entre les murs	Laurent Cantet	Nominated
2009 (82nd)	A Prophet	Un prophète	Jacques Audiard	Nominated
2010 (83rd)	Of Gods and Men	Des hommes et des dieux	Xavier Beauvois	Not nominated
2011 (84th)	Declaration of War	La Guerre est déclarée	Valérie Donzelli	Not nominated
2012 (85th)	The Intouchables	Intouchables	Éric Toledano and Olivier Nakache	Made shortlist
2013 (86th)	Renoir		Gilles Bourdos	Not nominated
2014 (87th)	Saint Laurent		Bertrand Bonello	Not nominated
2015 (88th)	Mustang		Deniz Gamze Ergüven	Nominated
2016 (89th)	Elle		Paul Verhoeven	Not nominated
2017 (90th)	BPM (Beats per Minute)	120 battements par minute	Robin Campillo	Not nominated
2018 (91st)	Memoir of War	La douleur	Emmanuel Finkiel	Not nominated
2019 (92nd)	Les Misérables		Ladj Ly	Nominated
2020 (93rd)	Two of Us	Deux	Filippo Meneghetti	Made shortlist
2021 (94th)	Titane		Julia Ducournau	Not nominated
2022 (95th)	Saint Omer		Alice Diop	Made shortlist
2023 (96th)	The Taste of Things	La Passion de Dodin Bouffant	Tran Anh Hung	Made shortlist
2024 (97th)	Emilia Pérez		Jacques Audiard	Nominated
2025 (98th)	It Was Just an Accident	یک تصادف ساده	Jafar Panahi	Nominated
2026 (99th)	Minotaur	Минотавр	Andrey Zvyagintsev	Pending

== Shortlisted films ==
Every year since 2015, France has announced a list of finalists that varied in number over the years (from 3 to 5 films) before announcing its official Oscar nominee. The following films have been shortlisted by the Centre national du cinéma et de l'image animée:

Year	Films
2015	Dheepan · Marguerite · The Measure of a Man · Summertime
2016	Cézanne and I · Frantz · The Innocents
2017	Barbara · Redoubtable
2018	Climax · Custody · The Four Sisters · Lady J
2019	Portrait of a Lady on Fire · Proxima
2020	Cuties · DNA · Gagarine · Summer of 85
2021	BAC Nord · Happening
2022	Full Time · Paris Memories · One Fine Morning · The Worst Ones
2023	Anatomy of a Fall · The Animal Kingdom · On the Wandering Paths · Sons of Ramses
2024	All We Imagine as Light · The Count of Monte Cristo · Misericordia
2025	Arco · The Little Sister · Nouvelle Vague · A Private Life
2026	De Gaulle · Iron Boy · La Gradiva · The Unknown

== Notes ==
- ^{A} Russian title: Восток-Запад
