= César Award for Best Adaptation =

French film award

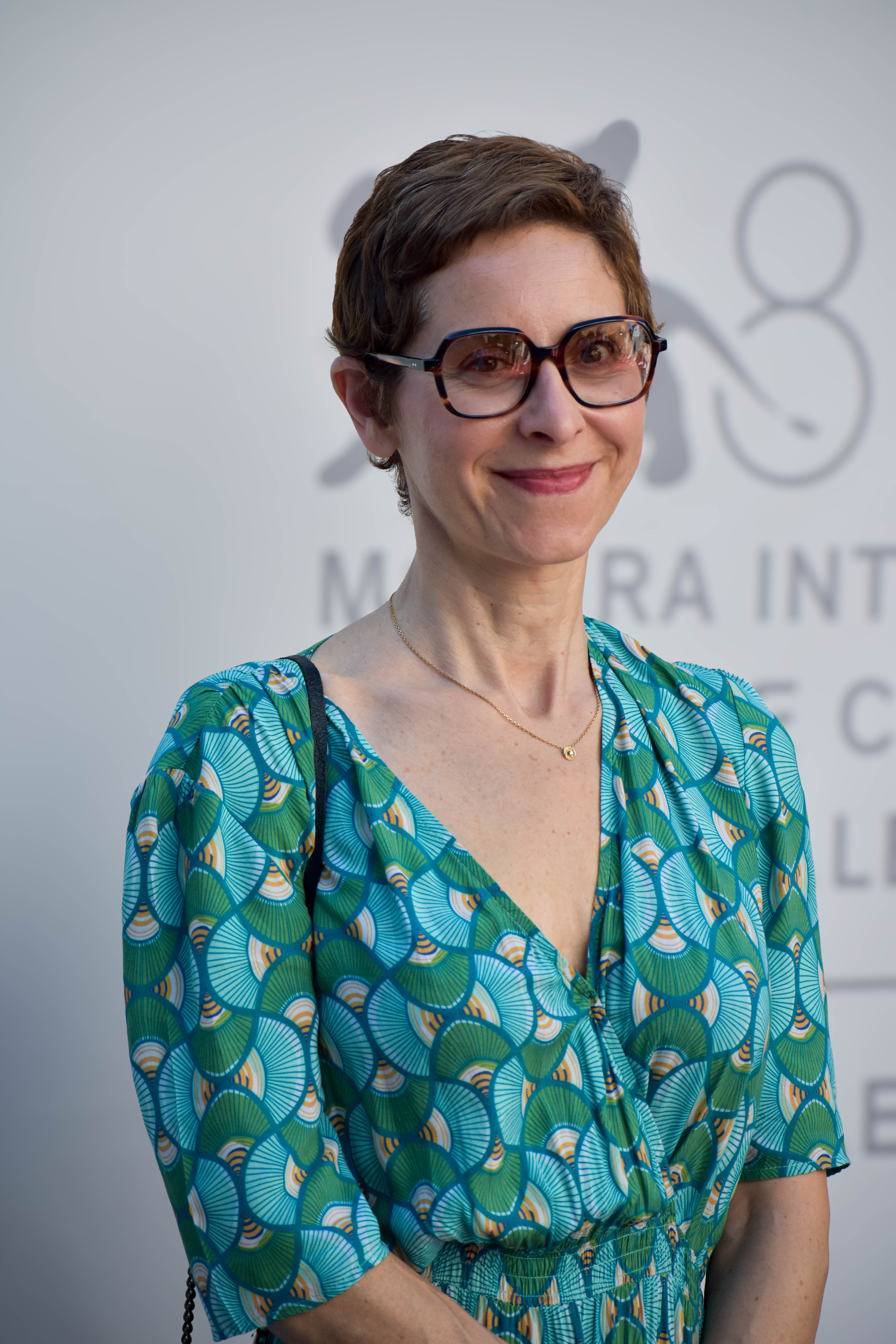
- 2026 recipient: Carine Tardieu
- Country: France
- Presented by: Académie des Arts et Techniques du Cinéma
- First award: 1983–1985; 2006–present
- Currently held by: Carine Tardieu, Raphaële Moussafir, Agnès Feuvre for The Ties That Bind Us (2026)
- Website: academie-cinema.org

The César Award for Best Adaptation (French: César de la meilleure adaptation) is an award presented by the Académie des Arts et Techniques du Cinéma. It was initially awarded from 1983 to 1985, and then awarded again in 2006, when the original category (César Award for Best Original Screenplay or Adaptation) was split into two awards, the other being César Award for Best Original Screenplay.

== Winners and nominees ==
=== 1980s ===
Year	Winners and nominees	Original title	Writer(s)
1983 (8th)	L'Étoile du Nord		Jean Aurenche, Pierre Granier-Deferre and Michel Grisolia
1983 (8th)	Danton		Jean-Claude Carrière and Jacek Gasiorowski
1983 (8th)	Les Misérables		Alain Decaux and Robert Hossein
1983 (8th)	Hécate	Hécate, maîtresse de la nuit	Pascal Jardin and Daniel Schmid
1984 (9th)	One Deadly Summer	L'Été meurtrier	Sébastien Japrisot
1984 (9th)	For Those I Loved	Au nom de tous les miens	Robert Enrico
1984 (9th)	So Long, Stooge	Tchao Pantin	Claude Berri and Alain Page
1985 (10th)	A Sunday in the Country	Un dimanche à la campagne	Bertrand Tavernier and Colo Tavernier
1985 (10th)	Le Bon Plaisir		Francis Girod and Françoise Giroud
1985 (10th)	The Public Woman	La Femme publique	Dominique Garnier and Andrzej Żuławski

The César Award for Best Original Screenplay or Adaptation was awarded from 1986 to 2005.

=== 2000s ===
Year	Winners and nominees	Original title	Writer(s)
2006 (31st)	The Beat That My Heart Skipped	De battre mon cœur s'est arrêté	Jacques Audiard and Tonino Benacquista
2006 (31st)	The Axe	Le couperet	Costa-Gavras and Jean-Claude Grumberg
2006 (31st)	In His Hands	Entre ses mains	Anne Fontaine and Julien Boivent
2006 (31st)	Gabrielle		Patrice Chéreau and Anne-Louise Trividic
2006 (31st)	The Last Mitterrand	Le promeneur du Champ-de-Mars	Georges-Marc Benamou and Gilles Taurand
2007 (32nd)	Lady Chatterley		Roger Bohbot, Pascale Ferran and Pierre Trividic
2007 (32nd)	Don't Worry, I'm Fine	Je vais bien, ne t'en fais pas	Philippe Lioret and Olivier Adam
2007 (32nd)	OSS 117: Cairo, Nest of Spies	OSS 117: Le Caire, nid d'espions	Jean-François Halin and Michel Hazanavicius
2007 (32nd)	Private Fears in Public Places	Cœurs	Jean-Michel Ribes
2007 (32nd)	Tell No One	Ne le dis à personne	Guillaume Canet and Philippe Lefèbvre
2008 (33rd)	Persepolis		Vincent Paronnaud and Marjane Satrapi
2008 (33rd)	Darling		Christine Carrière
2008 (33rd)	The Diving Bell and the Butterfly	Le scaphandre et le papillon	Ronald Harwood
2008 (33rd)	Hunting and Gathering	Ensemble, c'est tout	Claude Berri
2008 (33rd)	A Secret	Un secret	Nathalie Carter and Claude Miller
2009 (34th)	The Class	Entre les murs	François Bégaudeau, Robin Campillo and Laurent Cantet
2009 (34th)	The Beautiful Person	La belle personne	Christophe Honoré and Gilles Taurand
2009 (34th)	Crime Is Our Business	Le crime est notre affaire	François Caviglioli and Pascal Thomas
2009 (34th)	Love Me No More	Deux jours à tuer	Éric Assous, Jérôme Beaujour, Jean Becker and François d'Épenoux
2009 (34th)	Public Enemy Number One: Part 1 and 2	L'instinct de mort and L'ennemi public n°1	Abdel Raouf Dafri and Jean-François Richet

=== 2010s ===
Year	Winners and nominees	Original title	Writer(s)
2010 (35th)	Mademoiselle Chambon		Stéphane Brizé and Florence Vignon
2010 (35th)	Coco Before Chanel	Coco avant Chanel	Anne Fontaine and Camille Fontaine
2010 (35th)	One for the Road	Le Dernier pour la route	Philippe Godeau and Agnès De Sacy
2010 (35th)	Le Petit Nicolas		Laurent Tirard and Grégoire Vigneron
2010 (35th)	Wild Grass	Les Herbes folles	Alex Reval and Laurent Herbiet
2011 (36th)	The Ghost Writer		Robert Harris and Roman Polanski
2011 (36th)	The Tree	L'Arbre	Julie Bertuccelli
2011 (36th)	The Princess of Montpensier	La Princesse de Montpensier	Jean Cosmos, Francois-Olivier Rousseau and Bertrand Tavernier
2011 (36th)	L'Homme qui voulait vivre sa vie		Éric Lartigau and Laurent de Bartillat
2011 (36th)	Potiche		François Ozon
2012 (37th)	Carnage		Roman Polanski and Yasmina Reza
2012 (37th)	Delicacy	La délicatesse	David Foenkinos
2012 (37th)	Guilty	Présumé coupable	Vincent Garenq
2012 (37th)	Omar Killed Me	Omar m'a tuer	Olivier Gorce, Roschdy Zem, Rachid Bouchareb and Olivier Lorelle
2012 (37th)	Rebellion	L'Ordre et la Morale	Mathieu Kassovitz, Pierre Geller and Benoît Jaubert
2013 (38th)	Rust and Bone	De rouille et d'os	Jacques Audiard and Thomas Bidegain
2013 (38th)	One Night	38 témoins	Lucas Belvaux
2013 (38th)	What's in a Name?	Le prénom	Matthieu Delaporte and Alexandre de la Patellière
2013 (38th)	In the House	Dans la maison	François Ozon
2013 (38th)	Farewell, My Queen	Les Adieux à la reine	Gilles Taurand and Benoît Jacquot
2014 (39th)	Me, Myself and Mum	Les Garçons et Guillaume, à table!	Guillaume Gallienne
2014 (39th)	The French Minister	Quai d'Orsay	Antonin Baudry, Christophe Blain and Bertrand Tavernier
2014 (39th)	Jimmy P: Psychotherapy of a Plains Indian	Jimmy P.	Arnaud Desplechin, Kent Jones and Julie Peyr
2014 (39th)	Venus in Fur	La Vénus à la fourrure	David Ives and Roman Polanski
2014 (39th)	Blue Is the Warmest Colour	La Vie d'Adèle – Chapitres 1 & 2	Abdellatif Kechiche and Ghalia Lacroix
2015 (40th)	Diplomacy	Diplomatie	Cyril Gely, Volker Schlöndorff
2015 (40th)	The Blue Room	La Chambre bleue	Mathieu Amalric, Stéphanie Cléau
2015 (40th)	Lulu femme nue		Sólveig Anspach, Jean-Luc Gaget
2015 (40th)	Not My Type	Pas son genre	Lucas Belvaux
2015 (40th)	Next Time I'll Aim for the Heart	La Prochaine fois je viserai le cœur	Cédric Anger
2016 (41st)	Fatima		Philippe Faucon
2016 (41st)	L'Affaire SK1		David Oelhoffen and Frédéric Tellier
2016 (41st)	Macadam Stories	Asphalte	Samuel Benchetrit
2016 (41st)	The Clearstream Affair	L'Enquête	Stéphane Cabel and Vincent Garenq
2016 (41st)	Diary of a Chambermaid	Journal d'une femme de chambre	Benoît Jacquot and Hélène Zimmer
2017 (42nd)	My Life as a Courgette	Ma vie de Courgette	Céline Sciamma
2017 (42nd)	Elle		David Birke
2017 (42nd)	150 Milligrams	La Fille de Brest	Séverine Bosschem and Emmanuelle Bercot
2017 (42nd)	Frantz		François Ozon
2017 (42nd)	From the Land of the Moon	Mal de pierres	Nicole Garcia and Jacques Fieschi
2017 (42nd)	Heal the Living	Réparer les vivants	Katell Quillévéré and Gilles Taurand
2018 (43rd)	See You Up There	Au Revoir là-haut	Albert Dupontel and Pierre Lemaitre
2018 (43rd)	The Guardians	Les Gardiennes	Xavier Beauvois, Frédérique Moreau and Marie-Julie Maille
2018 (43rd)	Patients		Grand Corps Malade and Fadette Drouard
2018 (43rd)	Promise at Dawn	La Promesse de l'aube	Éric Barbier and Marie Eynard
2018 (43rd)	Redoubtable	Le Redoutable	Michel Hazanavicius
2019 (44th)	Little Tickles	Les Chatouilles	Andréa Bescond, Éric Métayer
2019 (44th)	The Sisters Brothers	Les Frères Sisters	Jacques Audiard, Thomas Bidegain
2019 (44th)	Mademoiselle de Joncquières		Emmanuel Mouret
2019 (44th)	An Impossible Love	Un amour impossible	Catherine Corsini, Laurette Polmanss
2019 (44th)	Memoir of War	La Douleur	Emmanuel Finkiel

=== 2020s ===
Year	Winners and nominees	Original title	Writer(s)
2020 (45th)	An Officer and a Spy	J'accuse	Roman Polanski and Robert Harris
2020 (45th)	Adults in the Room		Costa-Gavras
2020 (45th)	I Lost My Body	J'ai perdu mon corps	Jérémy Clapin and Guillaume Laurant
2020 (45th)	Oh Mercy!	Roubaix, une lumière	Arnaud Desplechin and Léa Mysius
2020 (45th)	Only the Animals	Seules les bêtes	Dominik Moll and Gilles Marchand
2021 (46th)	The Girl with a Bracelet	La Fille au bracelet	Stéphane Demoustier
2021 (46th)	Wasp Network	Cuban Network	Olivier Assayas
2021 (46th)	Mama Weed	La Daronne	Hannelore Cayre and Jean-Paul Salomé
2021 (46th)	Summer of 85	Été 85	François Ozon
2021 (46th)	Small Country: An African Childhood	Petit Pays	Éric Barbier
2022 (47th)	Lost Illusions	Illusions perdues	Xavier Giannoli and Jacques Fieschi
2022 (47th)	The Accusation	Les Choses humaines	Yaël Langmann and Yvan Attal
2022 (47th)	Happening	L'événement	Audrey Diwan and Marcia Romano
2022 (47th)	Hold Me Tight	Serre moi fort	Mathieu Amalric
2022 (47th)	Paris, 13th District	Les Olympiades	Jacques Audiard, Céline Sciamma and Léa Mysius
2023 (48th)	The Night of the 12th	La Nuit du 12	Gilles Marchand and Dominik Moll
2023 (48th)	Final Cut	Coupez!	Michel Hazanavicius
2023 (48th)	Undercover	Enquête sur un scandale d'État	Thierry de Peretti and Jeanne Aptekman
2024 (49th)	Just the Two of Us	L'Amour et les Forêts	Valérie Donzelli and Audrey Diwan
2024 (49th)	Consent	Le Consentement	Vanessa Filho
2024 (49th)	Last Summer	L'Été dernier	Catherine Breillat
2025 (50th)	Emilia Pérez		Jacques Audiard with Thomas Bidegain, Léa Mysius and Nicolas Livecchi
2025 (50th)	The Count of Monte Cristo	Le Comte de Monte-Cristo	Matthieu Delaporte and Alexandre de La Patellière
2025 (50th)	The Most Precious of Cargoes	La Plus Précieuse des marchandises	Michel Hazanavicius and Jean-Claude Grumberg
2026 (51st)	The Ties That Bind Us	L'Attachement	Carine Tardieu, Raphaële Moussafir, Agnès Feuvre
2026 (51st)	The Great Arch	L'Inconnu de la Grande Arche	Stéphane Demoustier
2026 (51st)	The Little Sister	La Petite Dernière	Hafsia Herzi

== See also ==
- César Award for Best Original Screenplay
- César Award for Best Original Screenplay or Adaptation
- Magritte Award for Best Screenplay
- Academy Award for Best Adapted Screenplay
- Academy Award for Best Original Screenplay
- BAFTA Award for Best Adapted Screenplay
- BAFTA Award for Best Original Screenplay
