= Lumière Award for Best Cinematography =

Annual French film award

- Country: France
- Presented by: Académie des Lumières
- First award: 2008
- Currently held by: Manuel Dacosse for The Stranger (2026)
- Website: academiedeslumieres.com

The Lumière Award for Best Cinematography (French: Lumière de la meilleure image), formerly known as the Prix de la meilleure photographie or the Prix technique CST de la meilleure photographie (until 2015), is an award presented annually by the Académie des Lumières since 2008.

== Winners and nominees ==
Winners are listed first with a blue background, followed by the other nominees.

=== 2000s ===
| Year | Winner | English title | Original title |
|---|---|---|---|
| 2008 (13th) | Éric Gautier | Into the Wild | |
| 2009 (14th) | Agnès Godard | Home | |

=== 2010s ===
| Year | Winner | English title | Original title |
|---|---|---|---|
| 2010 (15th) | Glynn Speeckaert | In the Beginning | À l'origine |
| 2011 (16th) | Caroline Champetier | Of Gods and Men | Des hommes et des dieux |
| 2012 (17th) | Pierre Aïm | Polisse | |
| 2013 (18th) | Antoine Heberlé | Inheritance | Héritage |
| 2013 (18th) | Antoine Heberlé | A Few Hours of Spring | Quelques heures de printemps |
| 2014 (19th) | Thomas Hardmeier | The Young and Prodigious T.S. Spivet | L'Extravagant Voyage du jeune et prodigieux T. S. Spivet |
| 2014 (19th) | Jérôme Alméras | The French Minister | Quai d'Orsay |
| 2014 (19th) | Christophe Beaucarne | Mood Indigo | L'Écume des jours |
| 2014 (19th) | Crystel Fournier | A Place on Earth | Une place sur la Terre |
| 2014 (19th) | Stéphane Fontaine | Jimmy P: Psychotherapy of a Plains Indian | Jimmy P. (Psychothérapie d'un Indien des plaines) |
| 2015 (20th) | Rémy Chevrin | À la vie | |
| 2015 (20th) | Yves Cape | Wild Life | Vie sauvage |
| 2015 (20th) | Josée Deshaies | Saint Laurent | |
| 2015 (20th) | Sofian El Fani | Timbuktu | |
| 2015 (20th) | Darius Khondji | Magic in the Moonlight | |
| 2015 (20th) | Arnaud Potier | Respire | |
| 2016 (21st) | David Chizallet | Mustang | |
| 2016 (21st) | David Chizallet | The Anarchists | Les Anarchistes |
| 2016 (21st) | David Chizallet | I Am a Soldier | Je suis un soldat |
| 2016 (21st) | Matias Boucard | L'Affaire SK1 | |
| 2016 (21st) | Irina Lubtchansky | My Golden Days | Trois souvenirs de ma jeunesse |
| 2016 (21st) | Claire Mathon | The Last Hammer Blow | Le Dernier Coup de marteau |
| 2016 (21st) | Claire Mathon | Mon roi | |
| 2016 (21st) | Claire Mathon | Two Friends | Les Deux Amis |
| 2016 (21st) | Arnaud Potier | Cowboys | Les Cowboys |
| 2016 (21st) | Sylvain Verdet | The Wakhan Front | Ni le ciel ni la terre |
| 2017 (22nd) | Jonathan Ricquebourg | The Death of Louis XIV | La Mort de Louis XIV |
| 2017 (22nd) | Christophe Beaucarne | From the Land of the Moon | Mal de pierres |
| 2017 (22nd) | Benoît Debie | The Dancer | La Danseuse |
| 2017 (22nd) | Antoine Héberlé | A Woman's Life | Une vie |
| 2017 (22nd) | Léo Hinstin | Nocturama | |
| 2017 (22nd) | Pascal Marti | Frantz | |
| 2018 (23rd) | Christophe Beaucarne | Barbara | |
| 2018 (23rd) | Céline Bozon | Félicité | |
| 2018 (23rd) | Caroline Champetier | The Guardians | Les Gardiennes |
| 2018 (23rd) | Alain Duplantier | The Sower | Le Semeur |
| 2018 (23rd) | Irina Lubtchansky | Ismael's Ghosts | Les Fantômes d'Ismaël |
| 2018 (23rd) | Vincent Mathias | See You Up There | Au revoir là-haut |
| 2019 (24th) | Benoît Debie | The Sisters Brothers | Les Frères Sisters |
| 2019 (24th) | Benoît Debie | Climax | |
| 2019 (24th) | Laurent Desmet | Lady J | Mademoiselle de Joncquières |
| 2019 (24th) | Julien Hirsch | One Nation, One King | Un peuple et son roi |
| 2019 (24th) | David Ungaro | To the Ends of the World | Les Confins du monde |

=== 2020s ===
| Year | Winner | English title | Original title |
|---|---|---|---|
| 2020 (25th) | Claire Mathon | Portrait of a Lady on Fire | Portrait de la jeune fille en feu |
| 2020 (25th) | Manuel Dacosse | By the Grace of God | Grâce à Dieu |
| 2020 (25th) | Paweł Edelman | An Officer and a Spy | J'accuse |
| 2020 (25th) | Irina Lubtchansky | Oh Mercy! | Roubaix, une lumière |
| 2020 (25th) | Julien Poupard | Les Misérables | |
| 2021 (26th) | Hichame Alaouié | Summer of 85 | Été 85 |
| 2021 (26th) | Renato Berta | The Salt of Tears | Le Sel des larmes |
| 2021 (26th) | Laurent Desmet | Love Affair(s) | Les Choses qu'on dit, les Choses qu'on fait |
| 2021 (26th) | Yann Maritaud | Slalom | |
| 2021 (26th) | Aurélien Marra | Two of Us | Deux |
| 2022 (27th) | Caroline Champetier | Annette | |
| 2022 (27th) | Christophe Beaucarne | Lost Illusions | Illusions perdues |
| 2022 (27th) | Romain Carcanade | The Swarm | La Nuée |
| 2022 (27th) | Tom Harari | Onoda: 10,000 Nights in the Jungle | Onoda, 10 000 nuits dans la jungle |
| 2022 (27th) | Laurent Tangy | Happening | L'Événement |
| 2023 (28th) | Artur Tort | Pacifiction | Pacifiction – Tourment sur les îles |
| 2023 (28th) | Sébastien Buchmann | The Passengers of the Night | Les Passagers de la nuit |
| 2023 (28th) | Benoît Debie | Vortex | |
| 2023 (28th) | Patrick Ghiringhelli | The Night of the 12th | La Nuit du 12 |
| 2023 (28th) | Claire Mathon | Saint Omer | |
| 2024 (29th) | Jonathan Ricquebourg | The Taste of Things | La Passion de Dodin Bouffant |
| 2024 (29th) | Simon Beaufils | Anatomy of a Fall | Anatomie d'une chute |
| 2024 (29th) | David Cailley | The Animal Kingdom | Le Règne animal |
| 2024 (29th) | Hélène Louvart | Disco Boy | |
| 2024 (29th) | Sylvain Verdet | Sons of Ramses | Goutte d'or |
| 2025 (30th) | Nicolas Bolduc | The Count of Monte Cristo | Le Comte de Monte-Cristo |
| 2025 (30th) | Josée Deshaies | The Beast | La Bête |
| 2025 (30th) | Paul Guilhaume | Emilia Pérez | |
| 2025 (30th) | Claire Mathon | Misericordia | Miséricorde |
| 2025 (30th) | Tristan Galand | Souleymane's Story | L'Histoire de Souleymane |
| 2026 (31st) | Manuel Dacosse | The Stranger | L'Étranger |
| 2026 (31st) | Marine Atlan | The Girl in the Snow | L'Engloutie |
| 2026 (31st) | David Chambille | Nouvelle Vague | |
| 2026 (31st) | Pascal Lagriffoul | The Condition | La Condition |
| 2026 (31st) | Vincent Munier, Antoine Lavorel and Laurent Joffrion | Whispers in the Woods | Le Chant des forêts |

== See also ==
- César Award for Best Cinematography
