= Red Island (film) =

- Release poster
- Directed by: Robin Campillo
- Written by: Robin Campillo; Gilles Marchand
- Produced by: Marie-Ange Luciani
- Starring: Nadia Tereszkiewicz; Quim Gutiérrez; Charlie Vauselle; Amely Rakotoarimalala; Hugues Delamarlière; Sophie Guillemin; David Serero
- Cinematography: Jeanne Lapoirie
- Edited by: Robin Campillo; Anita Roth; Stéphanie Léger
- Music by: Arnaud Rebotini
- Production company: Les Films de Pierre
- Distributed by: Memento Distribution
- Release date: 31 May 2023
- Running time: 116 minutes
- Countries: France; Belgium
- Language: French
- Budget: €7.2 million
- Box office: $1.1 million

Red Island (French: L'Île rouge) is a 2023 coming-of-age drama film directed by Robin Campillo. Written by Campillo and Gilles Marchand, it stars Nadia Tereszkiewicz, Quim Gutiérrez, and Charlie Vauselle. Set in the early 1970s Madagascar, where Campillo spent his childhood, it follows an eight-year-old boy and his family stationed in a French military base.

== Cast ==
- Nadia Tereszkiewicz as Colette Lopez
- Quim Gutiérrez as Robert Lopez
- Charlie Vauselle as Thomas
- Amely Rakotoarimalala as Miangaly
- Hugues Delamarlière as Bernard Huissens
- Sophie Guillemin as Mrs. Guedj
- David Serero as Mr. Guedj
- Luna Carpiaux as Odile Huissens
- Mitia Ralaivita as Andry
- Cathy Pham as Suzanne
- Mathis Piberne as Alain
- Sacha Cosar-Accaoui as Michel
- Calissa Oskal-Ool as Fantômette

== Production ==
Filming took place from August to November 2021. Working titles included École de l'air and Vazaha (Les Blancs).

== Release ==
Red Island was released in French cinemas on 31 May 2023. It was submitted to the 2023 edition of the Cannes Film Festival, where Campillo's previous film, BPM (Beats per Minute), premiered and received the Grand Prix in 2017, but it was not selected. It screened in competition at the 71st San Sebastián International Film Festival in September 2023.

== Reception ==
On the review aggregator website Rotten Tomatoes, 81% of 32 critics' reviews are positive, with an average rating of 6.9/10. Metacritic, which uses a weighted average, assigned the film a score of 71 out of 100, based on 7 critics, indicating "generally favorable" reviews.

Reviewing the film for The Guardian, Peter Bradshaw gave it five stars out of five and described it as "a compelling, visually exquisite piece of work."
