= César Award for Best Original Screenplay =

French film award

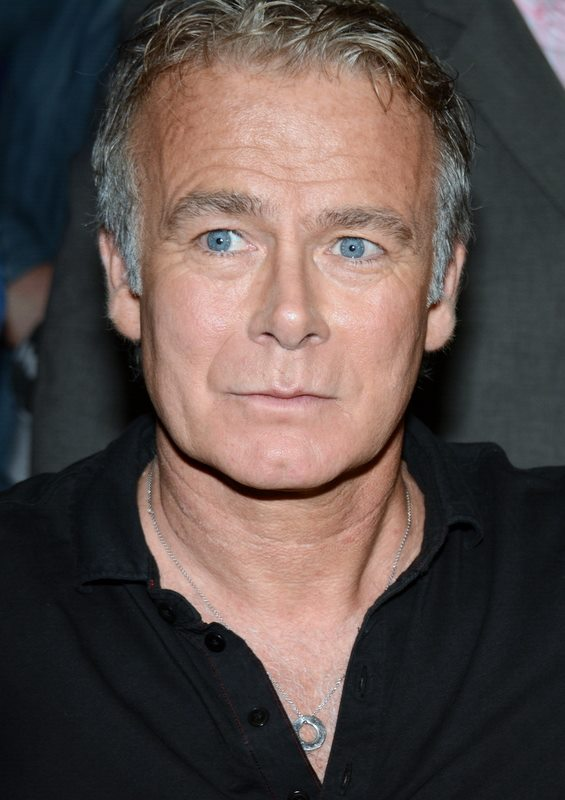
- 2026 recipient: Franck Dubosc
- Country: France
- Presented by: Académie des Arts et Techniques du Cinéma
- First award: 1983—1985; 2006—present
- Currently held by: Franck Dubosc and Sarah Kaminsky for Un ours dans le Jura (2026)
- Website: academie-cinema.org

The César Award for Best Original Screenplay (French: César du meilleur scénario original) is an award presented by the Académie des Arts et Techniques du Cinéma. It was initially awarded from 1983 to 1985, and then awarded again in 2006, when the original category (César Award for Best Original Screenplay or Adaptation) was split into two awards, the other being César Award for Best Adaptation.

== Winners and Nominees ==
=== 1980s ===
Year	Winners and nominees	Original title	Writer(s)
1983 (8th)	The Return of Martin Guerre	Le Retour de Martin Guerre	Jean-Claude Carrière and Daniel Vigne
1983 (8th)	Qu'est-ce qui fait courir David?		Élie Chouraqui
1983 (8th)	La Balance		Mathieu Fabiani and Bob Swaim
1983 (8th)	A Good Marriage	Le Beau Mariage	Éric Rohmer
1984 (9th)	The Wounded Man	L'Homme blessé	Patrice Chéreau and Hervé Guibert
1984 (9th)	Entre Nous	Coup de foudre	Diane Kurys and Alain Le Henry
1984 (9th)	The ComDads	Les Compères	Francis Veber
1985 (10th)	Our Story	Notre histoire	Bertrand Blier
1985 (10th)	Full Moon in Paris	Les Nuits de la pleine lune	Éric Rohmer
1985 (10th)	My New Partner	Les Ripoux	Claude Zidi

The César Award for Best Original Screenplay or Adaptation was awarded from 1986 to 2005.

=== 2000s ===
Year	Winners and nominees	Original title	Writer(s)
2006 (31st)	Live and Become	Va, vis et deviens	Alain-Michel Blanc and Radu Mihaileanu
2006 (31st)	The Child	L'enfant	Jean-Pierre and Luc Dardenne
2006 (31st)	Hidden	Caché	Michael Haneke
2006 (31st)	Merry Christmas	Joyeux Noël	Christian Carion
2006 (31st)	The Young Lieutenant	Le petit lieutenant	Xavier Beauvois, Guillaume Bréaud and Jean-Eric Troubat
2007 (32nd)	Days of Glory	Indigènes	Rachid Bouchareb and Olivier Lorelle
2007 (32nd)	Jean-Philippe		Laurent Tuel and Christophe Turpin
2007 (32nd)	Orchestra Seats (a.k.a. Avenue Montaigne)	Fauteuils d'orchestre	Christopher and Danièle Thompson
2007 (32nd)	When I Was a Singer (a.k.a. The Singer)	Quand j'étais chanteur	Xavier Giannoli
2007 (32nd)	You Are So Beautiful	Je vous trouve très beau	Isabelle Mergault
2008 (33rd)	The Secret of the Grain	La graine et la mulet	Abdellatif Kechiche
2008 (33rd)	2 Days in Paris		Julie Delpy
2008 (33rd)	Molière		Laurent Tirard and Grégoire Vigneron
2008 (33rd)	Those Who Remain	Ceux qui restent	Anne Le Ny
2008 (33rd)	La Vie en Rose	La môme	Olivier Dahan
2009 (34th)	Séraphine		Marc Abdelnour and Martin Provost
2009 (34th)	A Christmas Tale	Un conte de Noël	Emmanuel Bourdieu and Arnaud Desplechin
2009 (34th)	The First Day of the Rest of Your Life	Le premier jour du reste de ta vie	Rémi Bezançon
2009 (34th)	I've Loved You So Long	Il y a longtemps que je t'aime	Philippe Claudel
2009 (34th)	Welcome to the Sticks	Bienvenue chez les Ch'tis	Dany Boon, Alexandre Charlot and Franck Magnier

=== 2010s ===
Year	Winners and nominees	Original title	Writer(s)
2010 (35th)	A Prophet	Un prophète	Jacques Audiard, Thomas Bidegain, Abdel Raouf Dafri and Nicolas Peufaillit
2010 (35th)	In the Beginning	À l'origine	Xavier Giannoli
2010 (35th)	Skirt Day	La Journée de la jupe	Jean-Paul Lilienfeld
2010 (35th)	Welcome		Philippe Lioret, Emmanuel Courcol and Olivier Adam
2010 (35th)	Le Concert		Radu Mihăileanu and Alain-Michel Blanc
2011 (36th)	The Names of Love	Le Nom des gens	Baya Kasmi and Michel Leclerc
2011 (36th)	On Tour	Tournée	Mathieu Amalric, Philippe Di Folco, Marcelo Novias Teles and Raphaëlle Valbrune
2011 (36th)	The Clink of Ice	Le Bruit des glaçons	Bertrand Blier
2011 (36th)	Of Gods and Men	Des hommes et des dieux	Étienne Comar and Xavier Beauvois
2011 (36th)	Mammuth		Benoît Delépine and Gustave Kervern
2012 (37th)	The Minister	L'Exercice de l'État	Pierre Schöller
2012 (37th)	Declaration of War	La Guerre est déclarée	Valérie Donzelli and Jérémie Elkaïm
2012 (37th)	The Artist		Michel Hazanavicius
2012 (37th)	Polisse		Maïwenn and Emmanuelle Bercot
2012 (37th)	The Intouchables	Intouchables	Éric Toledano and Olivier Nakache
2013 (38th)	Amour		Michael Haneke
2013 (38th)	Holy Motors		Leos Carax
2013 (38th)	Camille Rewinds	Camille redouble	Noémie Lvovsky, Florence Seyvos, Maud Ameline and Pierre-Olivier Mattei
2013 (38th)	Granny's Funeral	Adieu Berthe, l'enterrement de mémé	Bruno Podalydès and Denis Podalydès
2013 (38th)	A Few Hours of Spring	Quelques heures de printemps	Florence Vignon and Stéphane Brizé
2014 (39th)	9 Month Stretch	Neuf mois ferme	Albert Dupontel
2014 (39th)	Suzanne		Mariette Désert and Katell Quillévéré
2014 (39th)	The Past	Le Passé	Asghar Farhadi
2014 (39th)	Stranger by the Lake	L'Inconnu du lac	Alain Guiraudie
2014 (39th)	Cycling with Moliere	Alceste à bicyclette	Philippe Le Guay
2015 (40th)	Timbuktu		Abderrahmane Sissako and Kessen Tall
2015 (40th)	The Bélier Family	La Famille Bélier	Victoria Bedos, Stanislas Carré de Malberg, Eric Lartigau and Thomas Bidegain
2015 (40th)	Love at First Fight	Les Combattants	Thomas Cailley and Claude Le Pape
2015 (40th)	Hippocrates	Hippocrate	Thomas Lilti, Baya Kasmi, Julien Lilti and Pierre Chosson
2015 (40th)	Clouds of Sils Maria	Sils Maria	Olivier Assayas
2016 (41st)	Mustang		Deniz Gamze Ergüven and Alice Winocour
2016 (41st)	Dheepan		Jacques Audiard, Thomas Bidegain and Noé Debré
2016 (41st)	Marguerite		Xavier Giannoli
2016 (41st)	Standing Tall	La Tête haute	Emmanuelle Bercot and Marcia Romano
2016 (41st)	My Golden Days	Trois souvenirs de ma jeunesse	Arnaud Desplechin and Julie Peyr
2017 (42nd)	The Aquatic Effect	L'Effet aquatique	Sólveig Anspach and Jean-Luc Gaget
2017 (42nd)	Divines		Romain Compingt, Houda Benyamina and Malik Rumeau
2017 (42nd)	The Innocents	Les Innocentes	Sabrina B. Karine, Alice Vial, Pascal Bonitzer and Anne Fontaine
2017 (42nd)	Slack Bay	Ma Loute	Bruno Dumont
2017 (42nd)	In Bed with Victoria	Victoria	Justine Triet
2018 (43rd)	BPM (Beats per Minute)	120 battements par minute	Robin Campillo
2018 (43rd)	Barbara		Mathieu Amalric and Philippe Di Folco
2018 (43rd)	Raw	Grave	Julia Ducournau
2018 (43rd)	Bloody Milk	Petit paysan	Claude Le Pape and Hubert Charuel
2018 (43rd)	C'est la vie!	Le Sens de la fête	Éric Toledano and Olivier Nakache
2019 (44th)	Custody	Jusqu'à la garde	Xavier Legrand
2019 (44th)	The Trouble with You	En liberté!	Pierre Salvadori, Benoît Graffin, Benjamin Charbit
2019 (44th)	Sink or Swim	Le Grand Bain	Gilles Lellouche, Ahmed Hamidi, Julien Lambroschini
2019 (44th)	Guy		Alex Lutz, Anaïs Deban, Thibault Ségouin
2019 (44th)	In Safe Hands	Pupille	Jeanne Herry

=== 2020s ===
Year	Winners and nominees	Original title	Writer(s)
2020 (45th)	La Belle Époque		Nicolas Bedos
2020 (45th)	By the Grace of God	Grâce à Dieu	François Ozon
2020 (45th)	The Specials	Hors normes	Éric Toledano and Olivier Nakache
2020 (45th)	Les Misérables		Ladj Ly, Giordano Gederlini and Alexis Manenti
2020 (45th)	Portrait of a Lady on Fire	Portrait de la jeune fille en feu	Céline Sciamma
2021 (46th)	Bye Bye Morons	Adieu les cons	Albert Dupontel
2021 (46th)	My Donkey, My Lover & I	Antoinette dans les Cévennes	Caroline Vignal
2021 (46th)	Love Affair(s)	Les Choses qu'on dit, les choses qu'on fait	Emmanuel Mouret
2021 (46th)	Two of Us	Deux	Filippo Meneghetti and Malysone Bovorashy
2021 (46th)	Delete History	Effacer l'historique	Benoît Delépine and Gustave Kervern
2022 (47th)	Onoda: 10,000 Nights in the Jungle	Onoda, 10 000 nuits dans la jungle	Arthur Harari and Vincent Poymiro
2022 (47th)	Aline		Valérie Lemercier and Brigitte Buc
2022 (47th)	Annette		Leos Carax, Ron Mael and Russell Mael
2022 (47th)	Black Box	Boîte noire	Yann Gozlan, Simon Moutaïrou, and Nicolas Bouvet-Levrard
2022 (47th)	The Divide	La Fracture	Catherine Corsini, Laurette Polmanss, and Agnès Feuvre
2023 (48th)	The Innocent	L'innocent	Louis Garrel, Tanguy Viel and Naïla Guiguet
2023 (48th)	Full Time	À plein temps	Éric Gravel
2023 (48th)	Forever Young	Les Amandiers	Valeria Bruni Tedeschi, Noémie Lvovsky, Agnes de Sacy
2023 (48th)	Rise	En corps	Cedric Klapisch, Santiago Amigorena
2023 (48th)	Saint Omer		Alice Diop, Amrita David and Marie NDiaye
2024 (49th)	Anatomy of a Fall	Anatomie d'une chute	Justine Triet and Arthur Harari
2024 (49th)	All Your Faces	Je verrai toujours vos visages	Jeanne Herry
2024 (49th)	The Animal Kingdom	Le Règne animal	Thomas Cailley and Pauline Munier
2024 (49th)	The Goldman Case	Le Procès Goldman	Cédric Kahn and Nathalie Hertzberg
2024 (49th)	Junkyard Dog	Chien de la casse	Jean-Baptiste Durand
2025 (50th)	Souleymane's Story	L'Histoire de Souleymane	Boris Lojkine and Delphine Agut
2025 (50th)	Borgo		Stéphane Demoustier
2025 (50th)	Holy Cow	Vingt Dieux	Louise Courvoisier and Théo Abadie
2025 (50th)	The Marching Band	En Fanfare	Emmanuel Courcol and Irène Muscari
2025 (50th)	Misericordia	Miséricorde	Alain Guiraudie
2026 (51st)	How to Make a Killing	Un ours dans le Jura	Franck Dubosc and Sarah Kaminsky
2026 (51st)	Case 137	Dossier 137	Dominik Moll and Gilles Marchand
2026 (51st)	Nino		Pauline Loquès
2026 (51st)	Nouvelle Vague		Holly Gent and Vince Palmo
2026 (51st)	It Was Just an Accident	یک تصادف ساده	Jafar Panahi

== See also ==
- César Award for Best Adaptation
- César Award for Best Original Screenplay or Adaptation
- Lumière Award for Best Screenplay
- Magritte Award for Best Screenplay
- Academy Award for Best Adapted Screenplay
- Academy Award for Best Original Screenplay
- BAFTA Award for Best Adapted Screenplay
- BAFTA Award for Best Original Screenplay
