= Les Sanguinaires =

1997 French television film

- Written by: Laurent Cantet
- Directed by: Laurent Cantet
- Starring: Frédéric Pierrot; Jalil Lespert
- Country of origin: France
- Original language: French

Production
- Producers: Caroline Benjo; Carole Scotta; Simon Arnal-Szlovak
- Editors: Robin Campillo; Stéphanie Léger
- Running time: 68 minutes

Original release
- Release: 1997

Les Sanguinaires is a 1997 French television film directed by Laurent Cantet for the 2000, Seen By... project.

== Plot ==
With the hype of celebrations for the turn of the millennium becoming burdensome, a group of friends attempt to avoid the chaos by leaving for a nearly uninhabited island.

== Cast ==
- Frédéric Pierrot as Francois
- Jalil Lespert as Stéphane

== Production ==
The French company Haut et Court's producers Caroline Benjo and Carole Scotta initiated 2000, Seen By..., to produce films depicting the approaching turn of the millennium seen from the perspectives of 10 different countries. Benjo chose Cantet for France's contribution to the project because of his short films.

== Release ==
The film played on the French-German TV station Arte in November 1998 and was screened at the Venice Film Festival, but was never generally released in theatres.
