= The Big Bad Fox and Other Tales... =

The Big Bad Fox and Other Tales…
- French theatrical release poster
- French: Le Grand Méchant Renard et autres contes…
- Directed by: Benjamin Renner; Patrick Imbert
- Screenplay by: Benjamin Renner; Jean Regnaud
- Based on: The Big Bad Fox and A Baby to Deliver by: Benjamin Renner
- Produced by: Didier Brunner; Vincent Tavier
- Starring: Guillaume Darnault; Damien Witecka; Kamel Abdessadok; Antoine Schoumsky; Céline Ronté
- Edited by: Benjamin Massoubre
- Music by: Robert Marcel Lepage
- Production companies: Folivari; Panique! Production; Télétoon+
- Distributed by: StudioCanal
- Release dates: 15 June 2017 (Annecy); 21 June 2017 (France)
- Running time: 83 minutes
- Countries: France; Belgium
- Languages: French; English
- Budget: $3 million
- Box office: $9.6 million

The Big Bad Fox and Other Tales... (French: Le Grand Méchant Renard et autres contes…) is a 2017 French animated anthology comedy film directed by Benjamin Renner and Patrick Imbert, adapted from Renner's own comic books The Big Bad Fox and Un bébé à livrer. Originally conceived as half-hour TV specials, the project was restructured as a feature-length theatrical film, with the segments linked together by a frame narrative. The film premiered at the Annecy International Animated Film Festival on 15 June 2017 and was later released by StudioCanal in France on 21 June.

== Plot ==
The film begins in a theater with a group of animals preparing a show. The Fox, the host of the show, tells the audience they will share three different stories, most of which take place on a French farm led by animals. After speaking with the audience, the play begins when the animals tell Fox they're ready.

=== Baby Delivery ===
On the farm, Stork claims to have a broken wing and leaves a baby girl named Pauline whom he was to deliver to Avignon in the hands of a trio of farm animals: Pig, Rabbit and Duck. The last two are immature and clumsy, therefore, potentially dangerous to the baby. Initially, Pig refuses to take care of Pauline, but he tries to compensate for Rabbit and Duck's weaknesses so that little Pauline finds her parents. After several clumsy and misunderstood events from Pig nearly being devoured by a pike to getting mixed up with mailing Pauline to China instead of a tarsier they encountered along their journey, the trio manages to leave Pauline with her family, sadly saying goodbye to her. Once they get back to the farm, Pig discovers Stork was lying to the trio because he's just too lazy to do his job. Pig takes this calmly just so he can put Stork in a catapult and fling him away.

=== The Big Bad Fox ===
A fox who lives in the forest fails to eat the chickens on the farm. One of them can easily protect herself, and Fox always ends up eating radishes that Pig leaves for him. He later takes the advice of Wolf in stealing 3 chicken eggs at night, planning to eat them once they're fat. But the Chicks accept him as their mother, and he gradually gets attached to them, to the point of deciding to protect them from Wolf. Fox decides to run away to the farm with the Chicks. He fools Wolf by eating radishes instead of the Chicks and takes shelter on the farm by disguising himself as a chicken. He discovers with horror that the lead Chicken, whose eggs he had stolen, has sworn revenge and created a Fox Extermination Club in which she trains the other chickens in self-defense. Fox manages to hide for some time, but he is betrayed by the behavior of his chicks who, deciding to be foxes, bite their friends at school and even bring Fox a living one for dinner. Fox tries to scold them, but the Chicks, disappointed by his behavior, decide to return to the forest and make Wolf their new mother. Discovered, Fox is martyred by the Chickens, as he tries in vain to prevent the danger to the Chicks. Tossed out of the farm by explosives, Fifou tries to convince the lead Chicken to help him. Fox lands in the forest in the arms of Wolf who was about to eat the Chicks. He helps them and manages to hold off the Wolf while the chicks run away. The lead Chicken, who is the chicks’ biological mother, finally finds them, and after hearing of Wolf's plan that he told Fox to do, she and a group of chickens manage to defeat Wolf. The lead Chicken wants the Chicks to return, leaving Fox heartbroken, but the Chicks rush to him. The lead Chicken decides on an agreement with Fox: Fox continues to see the Chicks regularly and, in exchange, he helps the chickens to train themselves in self-defense against other predators.

=== Saving Christmas ===
On the farm, the animals prepare for the Christmas festivities. By multiplying nonsense and disasters, Rabbit and Duck destroy a plastic Santa that was hanging from the barn, and they're convinced they have killed the true Santa. Despite Pig's explanation, they are planning to take Santa's place to deliver the gifts to children around the world. Pig tries to stop them but is dragged along with them to the city, then taken to the pound, where the three animals are locked up with a pack of dogs. The cunning and resourcefulness of the three companions, fortunately, allows them to get off the hook, and after some clumsy events, Rabbit and Duck see another Santa clinging to a windowsill, but this time, it is the real Santa Claus. They manage to save him, and as a reward, Santa takes the trio back to the farm. The next morning, they wake up with presents.

=== Epilogue ===
The end credits begin with a return to the stage of all the characters. As the credits roll, various characters appear, including a frog sweeper, who is cleaning up the scene.

== Voice cast ==
Character	French voice actor	English voice actor
Fox	Guillaume Darnault	Giles New
Pig	Damien Witecka	Justin Edwards
Bunny	Kamel Abdessadok	Adrian Edmondson
Duck	Antoine Schoumsky	Bill Bailey
Chicken	Céline Ronté	Celia Imrie
Paula	Violette Samama	Louie-Loveday O'Brien
Alex	Jules Bienvenu	Alexander Molony
Evan	Augustin Jahn-Sani	Tallulah Conabeare
Wolf	Boris Rehlinger	Matthew Goode
Fifou	Guillaume Bouchède	Phill Jupitus
Santa Claus	Jean-Loup Horwitz	Marcel McCalla
Stork	Christophe Lemoine	Phil Whelans

Yves Yan as the tarsier from a Chinese zoo who is only able to speak Mandarin.

== Reception ==
The film received largely positive reviews from critics. On review aggregator website Rotten Tomatoes, it holds a 97% score based on 30 reviews, with an average rating of 7.30/10. The site's consensus states: "The Big Bad Fox and Other Tales uses its simple, classic animation style to tell a series of equally undemanding - yet utterly beguiling - stories the whole family can enjoy." Metacritic reports a 73 out of 100 rating, based on 4 reviews, indicating "generally favorable reviews".

=== Box Office ===
The Big Bad Fox and Other Tales was released in theaters in France at the end of June 2017. Exhibited in 303 cinema screens during its first week, it accumulated just over 35,500 admissions on the first day (including just over 9,400 admissions in Paris across 60 screens) and just over 125,800 admissions by the end of the first week (including just over 38,800 in Paris). Shown in 347 screens in the following two weeks, it garnered 148,500 new admissions in the second week (bringing the total to over 274,000 admissions in two weeks) and 76,490 new admissions in the third week (for a total of 350,900 admissions in three weeks). After one month of release, the film had accumulated just under 404,700 admissions, and it passed the 500,000 admissions mark during its fifth week. After six weeks of release, it totaled approximately 521,700 admissions. By the end of 2017, the film had accumulated around 663,000 admissions. At the beginning of March 2018, the film, still showing in a few theaters in France, had accumulated just under 679,600 admissions.

== Awards ==
- Annie Awards 2018: Nominated in three categories: Best Independent Feature, Best Character Animation in a Feature, Best Direction of a Feature
- Lumière Awards 2018: Lumière Award for Best Animated Film
- César Awards 2018: César Award for Best Animated Film

== Adaptations ==
- A Baby to Deliver was adapted into puppet theater by the company Melmac Théâtre in 2018.
- The Big Bad Fox was adapted for the stage by la compagnie du COMSI in 2024.
