= On Tour (2010 film) =

2010 film

- Theatrical release poster by Christophe Blain
- French: Tournée
- Directed by: Mathieu Amalric
- Written by: Mathieu Amalric; Philippe Di Folco
- Produced by: Yaël Fogiel; Laetitia Gonzalez
- Starring: Mathieu Amalric
- Cinematography: Christophe Beaucarne
- Edited by: Annette Dutertre
- Production company: Les Films du Poisson
- Distributed by: Le Pacte (France)
- Release dates: 13 May 2010 (Cannes); 30 June 2010 (France)
- Running time: 111 minutes
- Countries: France; Germany
- Languages: French; English
- Budget: $4 million
- Box office: $3.5 million

On Tour (French: Tournée) is a 2010 internationally co-produced comedy-drama film directed by Mathieu Amalric. It stars Amalric himself as a producer who brings an American Neo-Burlesque troupe to France, played by genuine performers Mimi Le Meaux, Kitten on the Keys, Dirty Martini, Julie Atlas Muz, Evie Lovelle and Roky Roulette. In a road movie narrative, the plot follows the troupe as they tour French port cities with their show, which was performed for actual audiences during the production. The inspiration for the film was a book by Colette about her experience from music halls in the early 20th century, and a part of Amalric's aim was to translate the sentiment of the book to a modern setting.

The film premiered at the 2010 Cannes Film Festival where it won the FIPRESCI Award, the festival's main prize from film critics. Amalric also received the Best Director Award, and the film was a nominee for the inaugural Queer Palm.

== Plot ==
Formerly successful television producer Joachim Zand returns from America to his native France, where he previously has left everything behind, including friends, enemies and his own children. In his company is a burlesque striptease troupe whom he has promised a grand performance in Paris.

Together they tour the French port cities, staying at cheap hotels and making success along the way. Old conflicts are, however, reignited upon the return to the French capital. Joachim is betrayed by people from his past, making him lose the venue where they were to perform, and the Paris finale comes to nothing.

== Cast ==
- Mathieu Amalric as Joachim Zand
- Miranda Colclasure as Mimi Le Meaux
- Suzanne Ramsey as Kitten on the Keys
- Linda Maracini as Dirty Martini
- Julie Ann Muz as Julie Atlas Muz
- Angela de Lorenzo as Evie Lovelle
- Alexander Craven as Roky Roulette
- Damien Odoul as François
- Ulysse Klotz as Ulysse
- Simon Roth as Baptiste
- Joseph Roth as Balthazar
- Pierre Grimblat as Chapuis
- André S. Labarthe as The cabaret manager
- Anne Benoît as The cashier
- Julie Ferrier as herself
- Jean-Toussaint Bernard as receptionist at Mercure

== Production ==
The idea for the film came from the 1913 book The Other Side of Music-Hall by Colette, a collection of texts written for a newspaper about her life during a music hall tour in the French provinces. The project started around the same time as the suicide of independent film producer Humbert Balsan, which also had made an impression on Amalric. "I'm fascinated by producers. I always wonder how they manage to keep going and take such responsibility. ... So these different themes came together and I invented a story about a French TV producer and the women who were courageous enough to come to France with him." In the early drafts of the screenplay, Amalric struggled with the context of the story, figuring whether he would be able to put early 20th century vaudeville in a present-day setting, or attach the sentiment of Colette's book to modern striptease. Then he read an article in Libération about the American Neo-Burlesque movement, where performers mix striptease with comedy and a resistance to social pressures, and Amalric saw a connection to what Colette had been doing. The narrative was written before any further research was made, as Amalric did not want the film to be too much like a documentary. The first time he saw a Neo-Burlesque show was in 2007, in Nantes. He says that he did not mention the film project to the performers, but spent the following three days in their company. Later on he went to the United States to see as many shows as possible and study the movement in detail.

The film was produced by Les Films du Poisson for a budget of 3.52 million Euro, including co-production support from Arte France, German company Neue Mediopolis and an advance on receipts from the National Center of Cinematography and the moving image. The director originally envisioned Portuguese producer Paulo Branco in the role of Joachim, but decided to cast himself only weeks before filming started. Amalric still wore a moustache throughout the film that was based on Branco's facial hair.

Filming started in April 2009 and lasted two months. The troupe went on an actual tour along French port cities in order to provide the necessary footage. Hundreds of local extras performed as themselves as audiences. Locations were used in Le Havre, La Rochelle, Nantes and Rochefort. For the visual style Amalric drew inspiration from American cinema of the 1970s, and in particular The Killing of a Chinese Bookie by John Cassavetes.

== Release ==
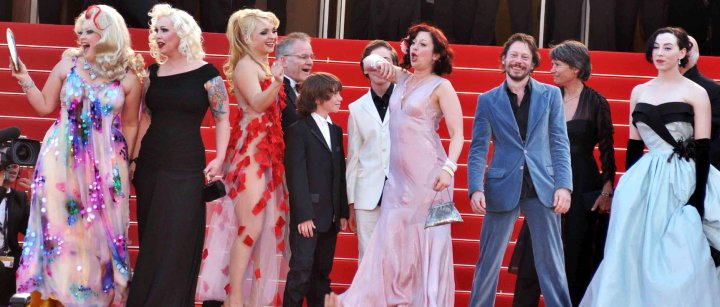
The red carpet at the Cannes Film Festival on 13 May 2010. From left to right: Dirty Martini, Mimi Le Meaux, Julie Atlas Muz, festival general Thierry Frémaux, Simon Roth, Joseph Roth, Kitten on the Keys, Mathieu Amalric, festival CEO Véronique Cayla and Evie Lovelle.

On Tour premiered on 13 May at the 2010 Cannes Film Festival as the first film to be screened in the main competition. At the press conference following the screening, Amalric talked about how excited the performers were about the festival: "It’s the opposite of what happens in our movie. In the story, they were promised Paris, and got nothing. But in this story, they were promised nothing, and they’re all at Cannes".

The French theatrical premiere followed on 30 June through Le Pacte, who launched it on 159 screens. On Tour had an attendance of 172,154 during the first week and thereby entered the French box office chart at number five. One week later the number of prints had been increased to 275 and the film climbed one position. After two months at the box office, the film had a total of 479,000 admissions in France. The U.S. premiere was scheduled for 5 May 2011 as the closing night film of the 54th San Francisco International Film Festival.

== Reception ==
As of June 2020, the film holds an 85% approval rating on Rotten Tomatoes, based on 20 reviews, with an average rating of 6.63/10.

The immediate reception in Cannes was somewhat mixed. In Le Monde, Jacques Mandelbaum called it "a joy for the eyes and the heart", and argued that "even in its randomness, its failure and imperfection, On Tour is a film that was desperately needed." Jonathan Romney of Screen wrote that "this drama with comic touches doesn't live up to the brassiness misleadingly promised in the neon-styled opening credits", and continued: "On Tour doesn't suggest as strong a personality behind the camera as in front of it, and Amalric's appeal as a director – this is his fourth feature – is yet to prove itself commercially. But his own engaging lead performance will certainly be a selling point." "A few touching moments don't redeem this loose, baggy tale of redemption", Peter Brunette summarized his verdict in The Hollywood Reporter.

The film won two awards in Cannes. Amalric received the Best Director Award, and the film won the FIPRESCI Award for best film in the main competition. The FIPRESCI Award is handed out by an international group of film critics, and with the mixed response from festival reviews, Variety wrote that the win came as a surprise: "[On Tour] ranked second to last through Thursday on Cannes' main critics poll."

== Accolades ==
Award / Film Festival	Category	Recipients and nominees	Result
Cannes Film Festival	Palme d'Or		Nominated
Cannes Film Festival	Best Director	Mathieu Amalric	Won
Cannes Film Festival	FIPRESCI Prize		Won
César Awards	Best Film		Nominated
César Awards	Best Director	Mathieu Amalric	Nominated
César Awards	Best Original Screenplay	Mathieu Amalric, Philippe Di Folco, Marcelo Novias Teles and Raphaëlle Valbrune	Nominated
César Awards	Best Cinematography	Christophe Beaucarne	Nominated
César Awards	Best Editing	Annette Dutertre	Nominated
César Awards	Best Sound	Olivier Mauvezin, Séverin Favriau and Stéphane Thiebaut	Nominated
César Awards	Best Costume Design	Alexia Crisp-Jones	Nominated
Globes de Cristal Award	Best Film		Nominated
Gopo Awards	Best European Film		Nominated
Lumière Awards	Best Director	Mathieu Amalric	Nominated
RiverRun International Film Festival	Best Actor	Mathieu Amalric	Won
