= Until the Birds Return =

2017 film

- Film poster
- Directed by: Karim Moussaoui
- Written by: Karim Moussaoui
- Starring: Aure Atika
- Distributed by: Rotana Studios
- Release date: 22 May 2017 (Cannes)
- Running time: 115 minutes
- Country: France
- Language: French

Until the Birds Return (Arabic: طبيعة الحال), (French: En Attendant les hirondelles) is a 2017 French drama film directed by Karim Moussaoui. It was screened in the Un Certain Regard section at the 2017 Cannes Film Festival.

== Cast ==
- Aure Atika
- Nadia Kaci
