= Foxfire: Confessions of a Girl Gang (film) =

- Film poster
- Directed by: Laurent Cantet
- Screenplay by: Laurent Cantet; Robin Campillo
- Based on: Foxfire: Confessions of a Girl Gang by Joyce Carol Oates
- Produced by: Caroline Benjo; Julien Favre; Barbara Letellier; Carole Scotta; Simone Urdl; Jennifer Weiss
- Starring: Katie Coseni; Raven Adamson; Claire Mazerolle; Rachael Nyhuus; Paige Moyles; Lindsay Rolland-Mills
- Cinematography: Pierre Milon
- Edited by: Robin Campillo; Stephanie Leger; Sophie Reine
- Production company: Haut et Court
- Distributed by: The Film Farm
- Release date: September 11, 2012
- Running time: 143 minutes
- Countries: Canada; France
- Language: English

Foxfire: Confessions of a Girl Gang is a 2012 film directed by Laurent Cantet. The film is based on the 1993 novel of the same name by Joyce Carol Oates.

== Plot ==
Set in the 1950s, a group of young girls in upstate New York form their own gang.

== Cast ==
- Katie Coseni as Maddy
- Raven Adamson as Legs
- Claire Mazerolle as Goldie
- Madeleine Bisson as Rita O'Hagan
- Rachael Nyhuus as Violet
- Paige Moyles as Lana
- Lindsay Rolland-Mills as VV
- Tamara Hope as Marianne
- Ali Liebert as Muriel Orvis
- Ian Matthews as Mr. Buttinger
- Tim Hewitt as Pet Shop Owner

== Reception ==
As of June 2020, the film holds a 68% approval rating on review aggregator website Rotten Tomatoes, based on 19 reviews with an average rating of 6.26/10.
