= Barbara (2017 film) =

2017 film

- Film poster
- Directed by: Mathieu Amalric
- Written by: Mathieu Amalric; Philippe Di Folco
- Produced by: Patrick Godeau
- Starring: Jeanne Balibar; Mathieu Amalric
- Cinematography: Christophe Beaucarne
- Edited by: François Gédigier
- Distributed by: Gaumont
- Release dates: 18 May 2017 (Cannes); 6 September 2017 (France)
- Running time: 107 minutes
- Country: France
- Language: French
- Box office: $2.9 million

Barbara is a 2017 French drama film directed by Mathieu Amalric. It stars Jeanne Balibar and Mathieu Amalric. It tells the story of an actress who prepares to portray the famous French singer Barbara. The film had its world premiere in the Un Certain Regard section at the 2017 Cannes Film Festival on 18 May 2017. It was released in France on 6 September 2017.

== Plot ==
Brigitte is preparing for the role of the famous French singer Barbara. The actress carefully studies the character, gestures, manners, and intonations. She learns the music scores, mimics her facial expression, but, as Brigitte does and more and more of it, she gradually merges with the character. The director is also preparing to shoot the film: he studies archival footage and painstakingly selects the music. He is inspired and even possessed—but with Barbara or with her new incarnation?

== Cast ==
- Jeanne Balibar as Brigitte
- Mathieu Amalric as Yves Zand
- Vincent Peirani as Roland Romanelli
- Aurore Clément as Esther
- Grégoire Colin as Charley Marouani

== Release ==
The film had its world premiere in the Un Certain Regard section at the 2017 Cannes Film Festival on 18 May 2017. It was released in France on 6 September 2017.

== Reception ==
=== Critical response ===
On review aggregator website Rotten Tomatoes, the film holds an approval rating of 84% based on 19 reviews, and an average rating of 7/10. On Metacritic, the film has a weighted average score of 68 out of 100, based on 7 critics, indicating "generally favorable reviews".

Jay Weissberg of Variety praised Jeanne Balibar's performance in the film, saying: "She has not only Barbara's look but also her gestures down pat, and the uncanny way in which the editing conflates actress with subject keeps interest relatively high." Leslie Felperin of The Hollywood Reporter called the film "a self-reflexive and sometimes screamingly self-indulgent work that's strictly for hardcore French viewers and festivals."

=== Accolades ===
Award	Date of ceremony	Category	Recipient(s)	Result	Ref(s)
Cannes Film Festival	27 May 2017	Poetry of Cinema	Barbara	Won	
Prix Jean Vigo	12 June 2017	Best Film	Barbara	Won	
Louis Delluc Prize	15 December 2017	Best Film	Barbara	Won	
Lumière Awards	5 February 2018	Best Film	Barbara	Nominated	
Lumière Awards	5 February 2018	Best Director	Mathieu Amalric	Nominated	
Lumière Awards	5 February 2018	Best Actress	Jeanne Balibar	Won	
Lumière Awards	5 February 2018	Best Cinematography	Christophe Beaucarne	Won	
César Award	2 March 2018	Best Film	Barbara	Nominated	
César Award	2 March 2018	Best Director	Mathieu Amalric	Nominated	
César Award	2 March 2018	Best Actress	Jeanne Balibar	Won	
César Award	2 March 2018	Best Original Screenplay	Mathieu Amalric, Philippe Di Folco	Nominated	
César Award	2 March 2018	Best Cinematography	Christophe Beaucarne	Nominated	
César Award	2 March 2018	Best Editing	François Gédigier	Nominated	
César Award	2 March 2018	Best Sound	Olivier Mauvezin, Nicolas Moreau, Stéphane Thiébaut	Won	
César Award	2 March 2018	Best Costume Design	Pascaline Chavanne	Nominated	
César Award	2 March 2018	Best Production Design	Laurent Baude	Nominated	
