= BPM (Beats per Minute) =

2017 film by Robin Campillo

- Theatrical release poster
- French: 120 battements par minute
- Directed by: Robin Campillo
- Written by: Robin Campillo; Philippe Mangeot
- Produced by: Hugues Charbonneau; Marie-Ange Luciani; Jacques Audiard
- Starring: Nahuel Pérez Biscayart; Arnaud Valois; Adèle Haenel; Antoine Reinartz
- Cinematography: Jeanne Lapoirie
- Edited by: Robin Campillo; Anita Roth; Stephanie Leger
- Music by: Arnaud Rebotini
- Production companies: Les Films de Pierre; France 3 Cinéma; Page 114; Memento Films; FD Production
- Distributed by: Memento Films
- Release dates: 20 May 2017 (Cannes); 23 August 2017 (France)
- Running time: 140 minutes
- Country: France
- Language: French
- Budget: $5.8 million
- Box office: $7.7 million

BPM (Beats per Minute), also known as 120 BPM (Beats per Minute), (Note: The international English title is BPM (Beats per Minute), although some sources have used the title 120 Beats per Minute. The official UK title is 120 BPM (Beats per Minute).) (French: 120 battements par minute) is a 2017 French drama film directed by Robin Campillo and starring Nahuel Pérez Biscayart, Arnaud Valois and Adèle Haenel. The film is about the AIDS activism of ACT UP Paris in 1990s France. Campillo and co-screenwriter Philippe Mangeot drew on their personal experiences with ACT UP in developing the story.

It had its world premiere at the 2017 Cannes Film Festival, followed by screenings at other festivals. At Cannes it won critical acclaim and four awards, including the Grand Prix. It went on to win six César Awards, including Best Film, and other honours.

== Plot ==
In the early 1990s, a group of HIV/AIDS activists associated with the Paris chapter of ACT UP struggle to effect action to fight the AIDS epidemic. While the French government has declared its intent to support HIV/AIDS sufferers, ACT UP stages public protests against their sluggish pace, accusing the government of censoring and minimizing the fight against the virus. When the pharmaceutical company Melton Pharm announces its plans to reveal its HIV trial results at a prominent pharmaceutical conference the following year, ACT UP invades its offices with fake blood and demands it release its trial results immediately. While ACT UP makes some headway with its public protests, its members fiercely debate the group's strategy, with conflicting goals of showmanship and persuasion, with conflicting aesthetics of positivity and misery. ACT UP struggles to plan a more effective Gay Pride parade than in previous years, bemoaning the depressing, "zombie" atmosphere the AIDS epidemic had created.

The film shows a number of large meetings in a lecture theatre where the radical element demand more direct action and others aim to bring the scientists to meetings where they can get them to communicate results sooner. A deaf person points out they can do direct action AND pursue meetings with the labs. But soon some radicals have attacked Hélène, the mother of a teenager who contracted HIV through blood transfusion. Hélène had pushed for politicians to be tried and jailed for their mishandling of blood screening (which is how her son got HIV). To some this is against ACT-UP principles as prison is an unsafe place where people get HIV. The group always seem to be arguing.

The film gradually shifts from the political storyline of ACT UP's actions to the personal stories of ACT UP members. Foreshadowing later events in the movie, Jeremie, a youth who lives with HIV in the group sees his health deteriorate rapidly. Per his wishes, the group parades in the streets after his death, putting his name and face to the ranks of AIDS victims. Newcomer Nathan, a gay man who doesn't live with HIV, begins to fall in love with the passionate veteran Sean, who is HIV-positive. Nathan and Sean start a sexual relationship, and discuss their sexual histories. Sean got HIV when he was sixteen from his married maths teacher. Sean is already exhibiting signs of the disease's progression and soon his T-cell count is down to 160. Nathan offers to care for Sean as he gets worse. When Sean is released from hospital to Nathan's apartment for end-of-life care, Nathan euthanizes him. ACT UP holds a wake at their home. As per Sean's wishes, later they invade a health insurance conference, throwing his ashes over the conference-goers and their food.

== Cast ==
- Nahuel Pérez Biscayart as Sean Dalmazo
- Arnaud Valois as Nathan
- Adèle Haenel as Sophie
- Antoine Reinartz as Thibault
- Félix Maritaud as Max
- Médhi Touré as Germain
- Aloïse Sauvage as Eva
- Simon Bourgade as Luc
- Catherine Vinatier as Hélène
- Saadia Ben Taieb as Sean's Mother
- Ariel Borenstein as Jérémie
- Théophile Ray as Marco
- Simon Guélat as Markus
- Jean-François Auguste as Fabien
- Coralie Russier as Muriel
- Samuel Churin as Gilberti (Melton Pharm)
- François Rabette as Michel Bernie
- Yves Heck as the French teacher

== Production ==
Director Robin Campillo co-wrote the screenplay, describing himself as "an ACT UP militant in the '90s", meaning he did not have to carry out any other investigation into how to accurately portray the experience. One scene was also based on his experience with the AIDS epidemic, as he said "I've dressed up a boyfriend on his death". Co-screenwriter Philippe Mangeot was also involved in ACT UP.

At Cannes, Campillo explained his decision to go ahead with directing the film, saying "BPM is above all a film I wanted to make where the force of words transforms into pure moments of action". The budget of $5 million was raised in months.

The film was shot in Paris and partly in Orléans, including at the former La Source hospital.

== Release ==
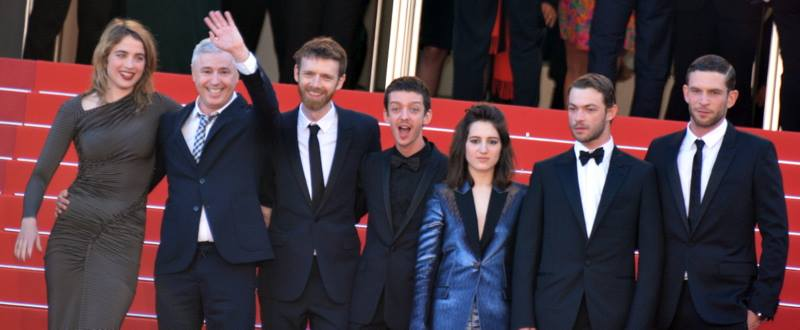
Director Robin Campillo and his cast attend the 2017 Cannes Film Festival.

The film had its world premiere at the 2017 Cannes Film Festival on 20 May 2017. On 24 June, it went to the Moscow International Film Festival, followed by the New Zealand International Film Festival in July. With the number of films at the Toronto International Film Festival being reduced from 2016, BPM (Beats per Minute) was nevertheless selected for the 2017 festival in September.

At Cannes, The Orchard acquired U.S. distribution rights to the film. It has been released in France on 23 August 2017 as scheduled.

=== Incidents ===
On 4 February 2018, a group of Christian protesters holding icons and singing church chants disrupted the screening of BPM at the Romanian Peasant Museum in Bucharest. Displaying banners with nationalist and Christian messages, the protesters claimed that "a film with this plot is inadmissible to be screened" at the Romanian Peasant Museum, because "it is a film about homosexuals", and "the Romanian peasant is Orthodox Christian." After half an hour of dispute, the police took the protesters out of the cinema. The screening of BPM was part of a series of events dedicated to LGBT History Month. Director Tudor Giurgiu, a supporter of LGBT rights and witness to what happened, criticized in a Facebook post such demonstrations and asked for protection measures in cinema halls where LGBT-themed films are screened.

== Reception ==
=== Critical reception ===
On the French review aggregator AlloCiné, the film has an average review score of 4.5 out of 5 based on 31 critics, making it the highest rated film of the year. It holds a 99% approval rating on review aggregator website Rotten Tomatoes, based on 137 reviews, with a weighted average of 7.9/10. The website's critical consensus reads, "Moving without resorting to melodrama, BPM offers an engrossing look at a pivotal period in history that lingers long after the closing credits roll." Metacritic has assigned the film a weighted average score of 84 out of 100 based on 26 critic reviews, indicating "universal acclaim".

Jada Yuan, writing for Vulture.com, spoke of being moved to tears by the film, praising it as "a unique, intimate portrait of the community from the inside". The Toronto Star's Peter Howell observed French critics at Cannes were generally excited about it and opined it deserved a top award. The Hollywood Reporter critic David Rooney positively reviewed the dialogue and the youthful cast, while criticizing the pace. Tim Robey, writing for The Daily Telegraph, gave it three of five stars, complimenting the comedic moments and a sex scene, balancing awareness of risk, with one character being HIV positive, and sexiness. Vanity Fair critic Richard Lawson hailed it as a "half sober and surveying docudrama, half wrenching personal illness narrative". Lawson and The Hollywood Reporter critics compared the film to the play The Normal Heart by Larry Kramer.

=== Accolades ===
It competed for the Palme d'Or in the main competition section at the 2017 Cannes Film Festival. In July 2017, it was listed among 10 films in competition for the Lux Prize. It was selected as the French entry for the Best Foreign Language Film at the 90th Academy Awards, but it was not nominated.

Award	Date of ceremony	Category	Recipient(s)	Result	Ref(s)
Cabourg Film Festival	18 June 2017	Audience Award	Robin Campillo	Won	
Cannes Film Festival	17—28 March 2017	Grand Prix	Robin Campillo	Won	
Cannes Film Festival	17—28 March 2017	FIPRESCI Prize	Robin Campillo	Won	
Cannes Film Festival	17—28 March 2017	François Chalais Prize	Robin Campillo	Won	
Cannes Film Festival	17—28 March 2017	Queer Palm	Robin Campillo	Won	
César Awards	2 March 2018	Best Film	Hugues Charbonneau, Marie-Ange Luciani, Robin Campillo	Won	
César Awards	2 March 2018	Best Director	Robin Campillo	Nominated	
César Awards	2 March 2018	Best Original Screenplay	Robin Campillo	Won	
César Awards	2 March 2018	Best Supporting Actor	Antoine Reinartz	Won	
César Awards	2 March 2018	Best Supporting Actress	Adele Haenel	Nominated	
César Awards	2 March 2018	Most Promising Actor	Nahuel Pérez Biscayart	Won	
César Awards	2 March 2018	Most Promising Actor	Arnaud Valois	Nominated	
César Awards	2 March 2018	Best Original Music	Arnaud Rebotini	Won	
César Awards	2 March 2018	Best Sound	Julien Sicart, Valerie de Loof, Jean-Pierre Laforce	Nominated	
César Awards	2 March 2018	Best Editing	Robin Campillo	Won	
César Awards	2 March 2018	Best Cinematography	Jeanne Lapoirie	Nominated	
César Awards	2 March 2018	Best Costume Design	Isabelle Pannetier	Nominated	
César Awards	2 March 2018	Best Production Design	Emmanuelle Duplay	Nominated	
Chicago International Film Festival	October 2017	Gold Q-Hugo	Robin Campillo	Won	
European Film Awards	9 December 2017	Best Film	Robin Campillo	Nominated	
European Film Awards	9 December 2017	Best Actor	Nahuel Pérez Biscayart	Nominated	
European Film Awards	9 December 2017	Best Editor	Robin Campillo	Won	
Globes de Cristal Awards	12 February 2018	Best Film	Robin Campillo	Won	
Globes de Cristal Awards	12 February 2018	Best Actor	Nahuel Pérez Biscayart	Won	
Guldbagge Awards	22 January 2018	Best Foreign Film	Robin Campillo	Nominated	
International Film Festival of India	28 November 2017	Golden Peacock (Best Film)	Robin Campillo	Won	
International Film Festival of India	28 November 2017	Best Actor	Nahuel Pérez Biscayart	Won	
Independent Spirit Awards	3 March 2018	Best International Film	Robin Campillo	Nominated	
Los Angeles Film Critics Association	3 December 2017	Best Foreign Language Film	Robin Campillo	Won (Note: Shared with Loveless by Andrey Zvyagintsev.)	
Lux Prize	14 November 2017	Best Film	Robin Campillo	Nominated	
Lumière Awards	5 February 2018	Best Film	Robin Campillo	Won	
Lumière Awards	5 February 2018	Best Director	Robin Campillo	Won	
Lumière Awards	5 February 2018	Best Actor	Nahuel Pérez Biscayart	Won	
Lumière Awards	5 February 2018	Best Screenplay	Robin Campillo and Philippe Mangeot	Won	
Lumière Awards	5 February 2018	Best Male Revelation	Arnaud Valois	Won	
Lumière Awards	5 February 2018	Best Music	Arnaud Rebotini	Won	
Merlinka Festival	13 December 2017	Best Queer Film of the Year	Robin Campillo	Won	
National Society of Film Critics	6 January 2018	Best Foreign Language Film	Robin Campillo	Runner-up	
New York Film Critics Circle	3 January 2018	Best Foreign Language Film	Robin Campillo	Won	
Online Film Critics Society	28 December 2017	Best Foreign Language Film	Robin Campillo	Won	
San Sebastian Film Festival	September 2017	Sebastiane Award	Robin Campillo	Won	
Satellite Awards	11 February 2018	Best Foreign Language Film	Robin Campillo	Nominated	
Vancouver Film Critics Circle	December 2017	Best Foreign Language Film	Robin Campillo	Won	
Washington D.C. Area Film Critics Association	8 December 2017	Best Foreign Language Film	Robin Campillo	Won	

== See also ==
- List of submissions to the 90th Academy Awards for Best Foreign Language Film
- List of French submissions for the Academy Award for Best Foreign Language Film
