= Philippe Di Folco =

French author and teacher

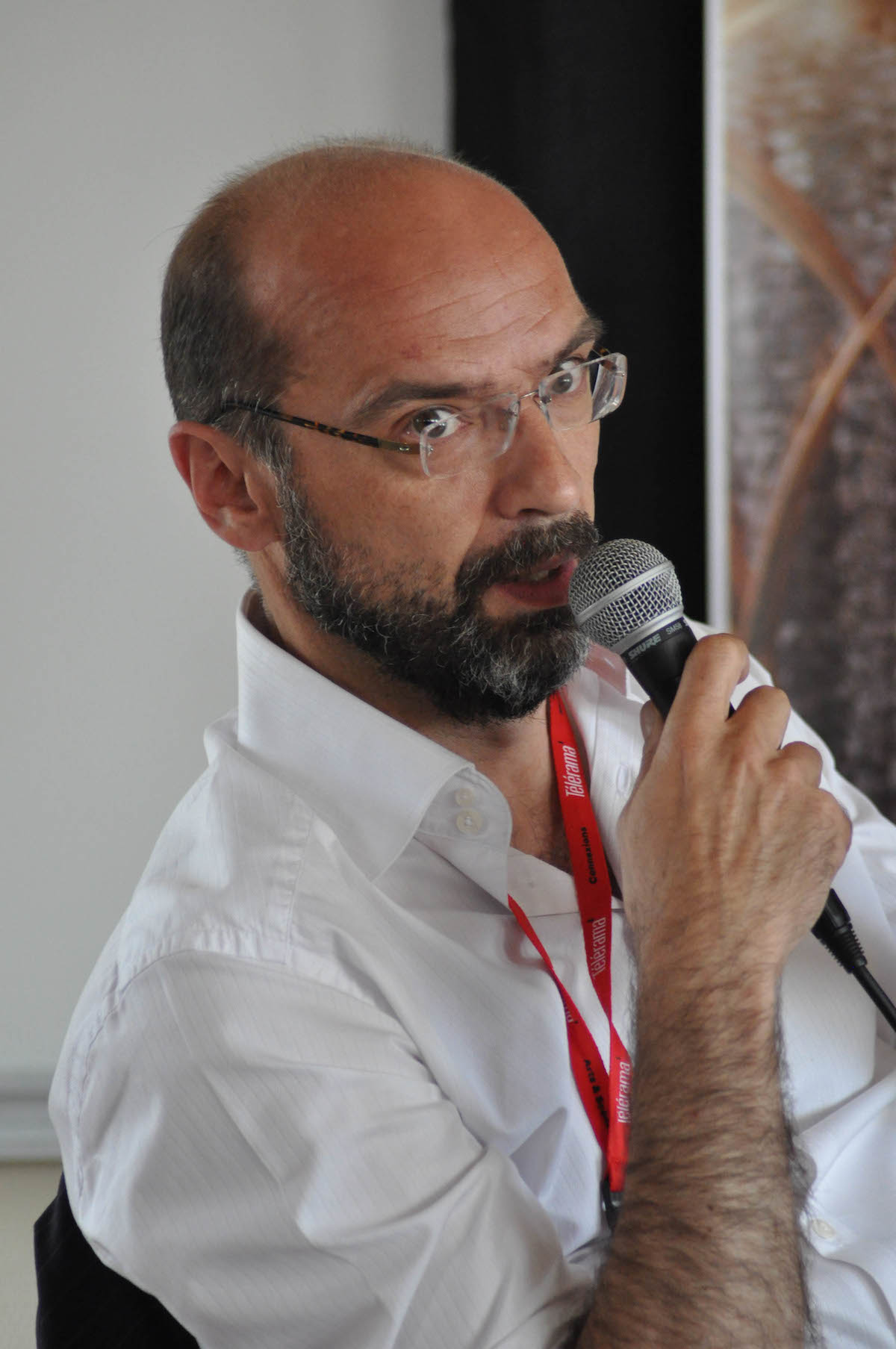
Philippe Di Folco

Philippe Di Folco (born 20 June 1964 in Choisy-le-Roi) is a French author and teacher.

== Biography ==
Born and raised in Val de Marne, near Paris, France, Philippe Di Folco studied Economics and Literature at School for Advanced Studies in the Social Sciences (Paris).

From 1988 to 1997, he was an academic publishing production manager for several companies such as Addison-Wesley.

He met Jean-François Bizot, CEO of Novapress in 1997, writing and producing for magazines and radio.

In 2003, he was invited to The Frye Festival.

He is co-author of On Tour with Mathieu Amalric: the film won an award at the 2010 Cannes Film Festival. Di Folco was nominated for the César Award for Best Original Screenplay 2010.

Since 2010, he has been teaching creative writing at École Estienne, Le Havre Art School.

He is the author in 2014 of the first biography about the French millionnaire Jacques Lebaudy, the "Emperor of the Sahara", who was shot by his wife in Long Island in 1919.

He is co-author of Barbara with Mathieu Amalric: they were nominated for the César Award for Best Original Screenplay 2018.

== Selected bibliography ==
- 2005: Dictionnaire de la Pornographie (Dictionary of Pornography), Paris: Presses Universitaires de France, foreword: Jean-Claude Carrière, translated into Greek, Romanian, Italian ISBN 2-130-54414-2
- 2008: We Love Books! A World Tour, Échirolles: Centre Européen du Graphisme ISBN 2-915-95209-4
- 2010: Dictionnaire de la Mort (Dictionary of Death), Paris: Éditions Larousse ISBN 978-2-03-584846-8
- 2011: Petit traité de l'imposture (About Imposture), Paris: Éditions Larousse ISBN 978-2-03-584614-3
- 2014: L'Empereur du Sahara (a biography of Jacques Lebaudy), Paris: Galaade Editions, ISBN 2-3517-6296-7
- 2014: Criminels. Histoires vraies, Paris: Sonatine éditions/Perrin, ISBN 978-2-35584-273-3

== Academic conference ==
- 2009: Traduire l'Éros / Translating Eros, Montreal, Concordia University Press
