= Karim Moussaoui =

Algerian film director, screenwriter, cinematographer and actor

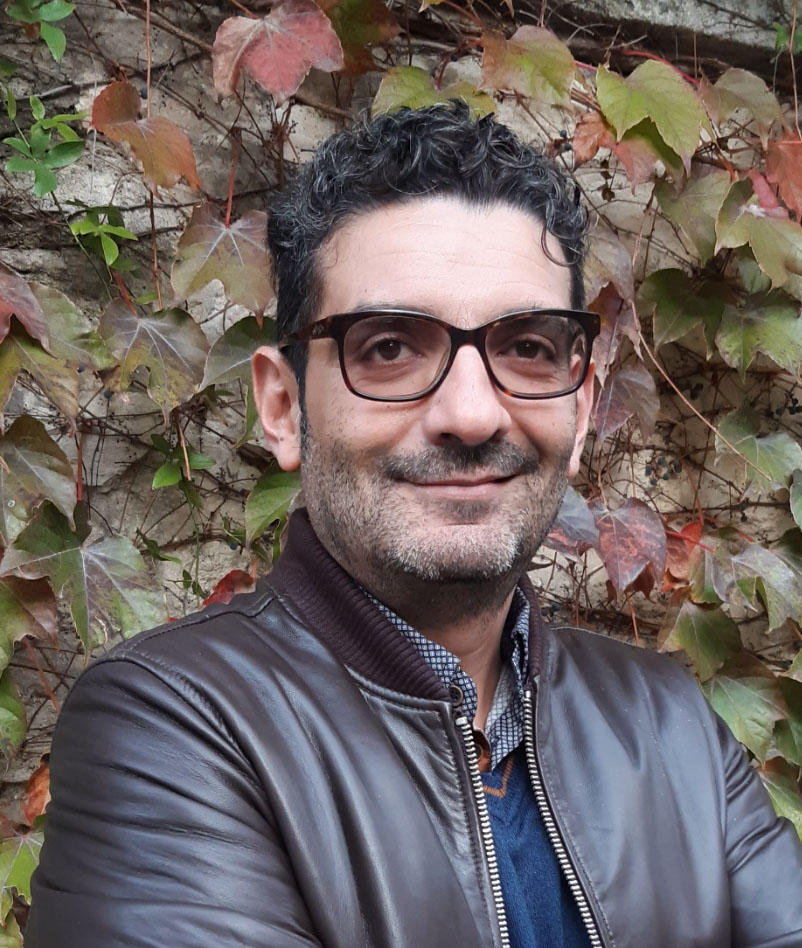
- Born: 1976 (age 49–50); Jijel, Algeria
- Occupations: Film director, screenwriter, cinematographer and actor
- Writing career
- Notable works: movies Until the Birds Return (2017), The Days Before (2013) and Les divas du Taguerabt (2020).

Karim Moussaoui (born 1976) is an Algerian film director, screenwriter, cinematographer and actor born in Jijel, Algeria, in 1976.

== Filmography ==
Moussaoui's films include:

Year	Film	Genre	Role	Duration (min)
2006	Délice Paloma by Nadir Moknèche	Drama feature	Actor	134 m
2006	Ce qu’on doit faire (مايجب علينا فعله)	Drama fiction short	Director and screenwriter	24 m
2008	Inland (Gabbla, Dans les terres) by Tariq Teguia	Comedy drama feature	Assistant director	140 m
2013	Les jours d'avant / The Days Before	Drama fiction feature	Director	40 m
2017	En attendant les hirondelles / Until the Birds Return	Drama fiction feature	Director and co-screenwriter	113 m
2020	Les divas du Taguerabt	Documentary short. To promote economical cooperation, China proposes to donate an expensive opera building to the city of Algiers.	Director and screenwriter	16 m
2020	Celles qui chantent	Documentary feature	Co-director with Julie Deliquet, Sergey Loznitsa and Jafar Panahi	75 m
2020	L'Algérie de Kamel Daoud by Jean-Marc Giri	Documentary feature	Cinematographer	52 m
2023	Ain El Djenna	Drama TV miniseries ENTV, Canal Algérie	Director	15 x 20–26 m

== Awards ==
Moussaoui's films obtained 6 prizes and 10 nominations, including:

Film	Festival	Award
The Days Before	Festival International du Film Francophone de Namur	2013 Winner Jury Special Prize
The Days Before	Clermont-Ferrand International Short Film Festival	2014 Winner Special Mention of the Jury International Competition
The Days Before	Brive Medium-Length Film Festival	2014 Winner Special Mention Grand Prix France
Until the Birds Return	Gijón International Film Festival	2017 Winner Special Jury Award
Until the Birds Return	Lumière Awards	2018 Winner Heike Hurst Award, Best First Film
