= The Workshop (film) =

2017 film

- Film poster
- Directed by: Laurent Cantet
- Written by: Robin Campillo; Laurent Cantet
- Produced by: Denis Freyd
- Starring: Marina Foïs; Matthieu Lucci
- Cinematography: Pierre Milon
- Edited by: Mathilde Muyard
- Music by: Edouard Pons; Bedis Tir
- Distributed by: Diaphana
- Release dates: 22 May 2017 (Cannes); 11 October 2017 (France)
- Running time: 114 minutes
- Country: France
- Language: French
- Budget: $4 million
- Box office: $1 million

The Workshop (French: L'Atelier) is a 2017 French drama film co-written and directed by Laurent Cantet. It was screened in the Un Certain Regard section at the 2017 Cannes Film Festival.

== Plot ==
Olivia, a well-known Parisian novelist, runs a writing workshop with a group of young people in La Ciotat, in the South of France. She is particularly intrigued by Antoine, a taciturn and not very sociable, young man. Antoine makes writing proposals that others consider shocking, and becomes the "black sheep" of the group. Olivia and Antoine, who seeks escape from his daily life by immersing himself in an extreme right-wing ideology (following Luc Borel, a fascist leader inspired from real-life Alain Soral), develop a relationship that is marked by attraction and repulsion.

== Cast ==
- Marina Foïs as Olivia Dejazet
- Matthieu Lucci as Antoine
- Mamadou Doumbia as Bouba

== Reception ==
On review aggregator Rotten Tomatoes, the film holds an approval rating of 89% based on 44 reviews, with a weighted average rating of 7.1/10. On Metacritic, the film has a weighted average score of 74 out of 100, based on 15 critics, indicating "generally favorable" reviews.
