= Robin Campillo =

French filmmaker and editor (born 1962)

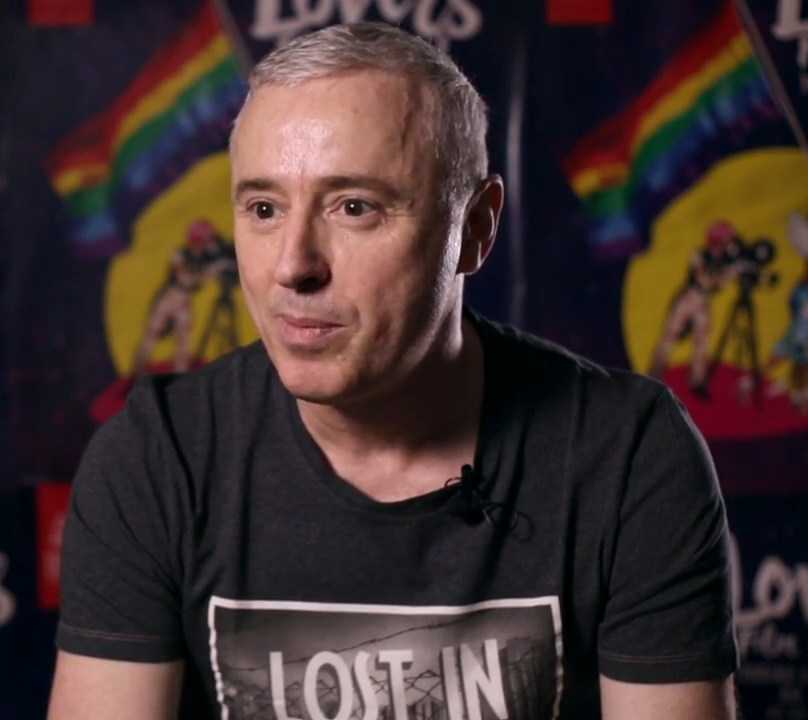
- Campillo in 2018
- Born: 16 August 1962 (age 64); Mohammedia, Morocco
- Occupations: Filmmaker and editor
- Years active: 1997–present

Robin Campillo (French: [ʁɔbɛ̃ kɑ̃pijo]; born 16 August 1962) is a Moroccan-born French filmmaker and editor. His films usually explore gay experiences in French society.

He is most known for BPM (Beats per Minute) (2017), which received critical acclaim and went on to garner multiple awards, including the Grand Prix at the 2017 Cannes Film Festival, and the César Award for Best Film.

== Career ==
Campillo gained international recognition for Time Out (2001), which he co-wrote with the film's director Laurent Cantet. The duo was nominated for the European Film Award for Best Screenwriter at the 14th European Film Awards.

The 2004's production They Came Back marked Campillo directing debut, the film had its world premiere at the Orizzonti section of the 61st Venice International Film Festival. The film popularity sparked two TV adaptations: The Returned by French premium television channel Canal+ and The Returned by American cable television channel A&E.

In 2008, once again reunited with Cantent, Campillo co-wrote The Class, which won the Palme d'Or at the 2008 Cannes Film Festival and was nominated for the Best Foreign Language Film category at the 81st Academy Awards. Campillo and Cantent were awarded the César Award for Best Adaptation at the 34th César Awards.

His second feature film, 2013's Eastern Boys, had its world premiere at the Orizzonti section of the 70th Venice International Film Festival, winning the section main prize. For the film, Campillo was nominated for the first time for the César Award for Best Director and the César Award for Best Film.

In 2017, Campillo directed BPM (Beats per Minute), the film had its world premiere at the main competition of the 2017 Cannes Film Festival, where it won the Grand Prix (second place), receiving universal acclaim. At the 43rd César Awards, Campillo won Best Film, Best Original Screenplay and Best Editing, and was nominated for Best Director.

His fourth feature film, Red Island, was released in French theaters on 31 May 2023, after being rejected by the Cannes Film Festival committee. Followed by an international premiere at the main competition of the 71st San Sebastián International Film Festival in September 2023.

In 2025, Campillo directed Enzo, originally conceived for Laurent Cantet, following his death Campillo took over the directing duties. The film had its world premiere as the opening film of the Directors' Fortnight section at the 2025 Cannes Film Festival.

== Filmography ==
=== Feature films ===
Year	English title	Original title	Notes
2004	They Came Back	Les Revenants	Also editor
2013	Eastern Boys		Also editor Orizzonti Winner - 70th Venice International Film Festival
2017	BPM (Beats per Minute)	120 battements par minute	Also editor Grand Prix — 2017 Cannes Film Festival; César Award for Best Film; César Award for Best Original Screenplay; César Award for Best Editing; Lumière Award for Best Film; Lumière Award for Best Director; Lumière Award for Best Screenplay; Nominated — César Award for Best Director
2023	Red Island	L'Île rouge	Also editor
2025	Enzo		Co-written with Laurent Cantet

=== Other credits ===
Year	Title	Credited as		Notes
Year	Title	Screenwriter	Editor	Notes
1997	Les Sanguinaires	No	Yes	
1999	Human Resources	No	Yes	
2001	Time Out	Yes	Yes	Nominated—European Film Award for Best Screenwriter
2003	Who Killed Bambi?	No	Yes	
2005	Heading South	Yes	Yes	
2008	The Class	Yes	Yes	César Award for Best Adaptation; Nominated—César Award for Best Editing; Nominated—Lumière Award for Best Screenplay; Nominated—Prix Jacques Prévert du Scénario for Best Adaptation
2012	Foxfire: Confessions of a Girl Gang	Yes	Yes	co-written with Laurent Cantet
2014	Return to Ithaca	No	Yes	
2015	Disorder	Yes	No	Script consultant
2015	Suite armoricaine	Yes	No	Script consultant
2016	Planetarium	Yes	No	co-written with Rebecca Zlotowski
2017	The Workshop	Yes	No	co-written with Laurent Cantet
2026	The Electric Kiss	Yes	No	original story; with Rebecca Zlotowski
