= Bloody Milk =

2017 French drama film

- French: Petit paysan
- Directed by: Hubert Charuel
- Written by: Hubert Charuel; Claude Le Pape
- Produced by: Alexis Dulguerian; Stéphanie Bermann
- Starring: Swann Arlaud; Sara Giraudeau
- Cinematography: Sébastien Goepfert
- Edited by: Julie Lena; Lilian Corbeille; Grégoire Pontécaille
- Music by: Myd
- Production company: Domino Films
- Distributed by: Pyramide Distribution
- Release dates: 20 May 2017 (Cannes); 30 August 2017 (France)
- Running time: 90 minutes
- Country: France
- Language: French
- Budget: €3.240.000; (≃$3.9 million)
- Box office: $3.8 million

Bloody Milk (French: Petit paysan, lit. 'Little peasant') is a 2017 French drama film directed by Hubert Charuel in his feature debut. It was presented in the Critics' Week section at the 2017 Cannes Film Festival.

== Cast ==
- Swann Arlaud as Pierre Chavanges
- Sara Giraudeau as Pascale Chavanges
- Bouli Lanners as Jamy
- Isabelle Candelier as Madame Chavanges
- Jean-Paul Charuel as Monsieur Chavanges
- India Hair as Angélique
- Géraldine Martineau as Emma
- Valentin Lespinasse as Jean-Denis
- Clément Bresson as Fabrice
- Jean Charuel as Raymond
- Julian Janeczko as Thomas
- Franc Bruneau as Régis
- Claude Le Pape as Francine

== Production ==
The film was mostly shot at director Hubert Charuel's family farm in Droyes (Haute-Marne).

== Release ==
The film had its world premiere in the Critics' Week section at the 70th Cannes Film Festival on 20 May 2017. It was released in French theaters on 30 August 2017.

== Reception ==
=== Box office ===
Bloody Milk grossed $3.8 million in France, against a production budget of about $3.9 million.

=== Critical response ===
The film holds a 75% approval rating on the review aggregator website Rotten Tomatoes, based on 8 reviews, with a weighted average of 7/10.

=== Accolades ===
Year	Award	Category	Recipient(s)	Result
2017	Cannes Film Festival	Caméra d'Or	Hubert Charuel	Nominated
2017	Jerusalem Film Festival	FIPRESCI Prize for International First Film	Hubert Charuel	Nominated
2017	Philadelphia Film Festival	Archie Award for Best First Feature	Hubert Charuel	Won
2017	Louis Delluc Prize	Best First Film	Hubert Charuel	Nominated
2018	Globes de Cristal Award	Best Actor	Swann Arlaud	Nominated
2018	César Awards	Best Film	Stéphanie Bermann and Alexis Dulguerian	Nominated
2018	César Awards	Best First Feature Film	Hubert Charuel	Won
2018	César Awards	Best Director	Hubert Charuel	Nominated
2018	César Awards	Best Actor	Swann Arlaud	Won
2018	César Awards	Best Supporting Actress	Sara Giraudeau	Won
2018	César Awards	Best Original Screenplay	Hubert Charuel and Claude Le Pape	Nominated
2018	César Awards	Best Editing	Julie Lena, Lilian Corbeille and Grégoire Pontécaille	Nominated
2018	César Awards	Best Original Music	Myd	Nominated

== See also ==
- 2017 in film
