= Laurent Cantet =

French director, cinematographer and screenwriter (1961–2024)

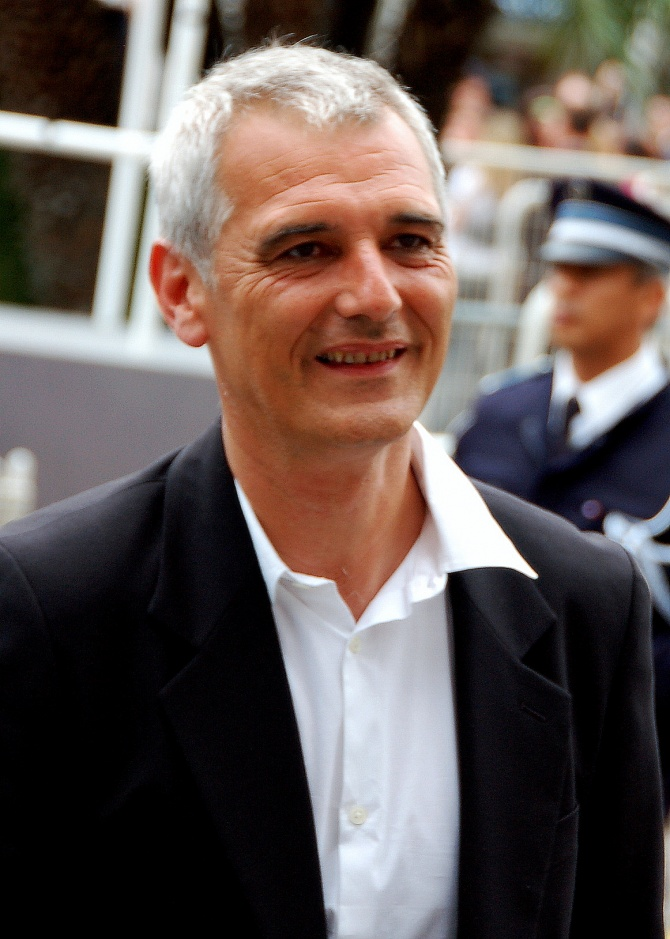
- Cantet in 2008
- Born: 11 April 1961; Melle, Deux-Sèvres, France
- Died: 25 April 2024 (aged 63); Paris, France
- Occupations: Film director, screenwriter, cinematographer
- Years active: 1987–2024

Laurent Cantet (French: [lɔʁɑ̃ kɑ̃tɛ]; 11 April 1961 – 25 April 2024) was a French director, cinematographer and screenwriter. His film Entre les murs (The Class) won the top prize at the Cannes Film Festival in 2008.

== Biography ==
Laurent Cantet was born in 1961 in the town of Melle, Deux-Sèvres in western France; his parents were schoolteachers. He went to university in Marseille to study photography, and then entered the Institut des hautes études cinématographiques (IDHEC) in Paris where he graduated in 1986. His peers at IDHEC included Dominik Moll, Gilles Marchand and Robin Campillo. After initially working in television, he became assistant director to Marcel Ophuls for Veillées d'armes (1994), a documentary about the siege of Sarajevo. He went on to make some short films, often in collaboration with colleagues from film school. In 1998 Cantet was one of several young directors invited to make films for the European TV company Arte to mark the forthcoming year 2000, and he completed the mid-length film Les Sanguinaires (1999), about a group of friends who travel to an uninhabited island to escape the millennial celebrations.

His first feature film, with a screenplay written jointly with Gilles Marchand, was Ressources humaines (Human Resources, 1999) about a management trainee working in his father's factory. This achieved both critical and popular success, and it won two César Awards. His next film L'Emploi du temps (Time Out, 2001) continued his interest in employment issues, drawing upon a real-life case about a professional man who concealed his redundancy from his family. The screenplay was written jointly with Robin Campillo, who also worked on several of Cantet's later films. Social and political issues took on a more international perspective in Vers le sud (Heading South, 2005) about sexual tourism in Haiti. In Entre les murs (The Class, 2008) Cantet made a film which blended fiction and documentary exploring the daily life of a class of students in a Parisian school. The cast was composed entirely of non-professionals, including the teacher on whose book the film was based. The film won the Palme d'Or at the Cannes film festival. Subsequent projects have taken Cantet to Canada for Foxfire: Confessions of a Girl Gang (2012) and to Havana for Retour à Ithaque (Return to Ithaca, 2014), working in English and Spanish respectively.

In France Cantet demonstrated a long-standing concern for illegal migrant workers (the sans-papiers) and supported a collective of French filmmakers (the Collectif des cinéastes pour les sans-papiers) who have made a number of short films to bring wider attention to the risks faced by migrant workers. Another aspect of Cantet's interest in social issues is reflected in his preferred method for developing a film, particularly those which feature non-professional actors. He said that he likes to give a lot of attention and time to the casting, seeking people who will play not themselves but a role similar to their own in real life of which they have a natural understanding (e.g. a factory manager and a trade unionist in Ressources humaines, the pupils in Entre les murs), and then to involve his actors in developing not only their own characters but sometimes the script as well, in a process of workshops and rehearsals.

This method was used by Cantet for Entre les murs, and he returned to it in L'Atelier (The Workshop, 2017) in which he worked with a group of young people from La Ciotat on the Mediterranean coast, exploring their present-day problems in a former shipbuilding town which had been radically transformed since its industrial past. Their fictional project in the film shows them collaborating in a workshop to write a novel about their town and drawing on their own experiences to enrich it, mirroring aspects of Cantet's own method in making the film.

Alongside Pascale Ferran and Cédric Klapisch, in 2015 he founded LaCinetek, a streaming platform with films chosen by filmmakers from all around the world.

In December 2023, alongside 50 other filmmakers, Cantet signed an open letter published in Libération demanding a ceasefire and an end to the killing of civilians amid the 2023 Israeli invasion of the Gaza Strip, and for a humanitarian corridor into Gaza to be established for humanitarian aid, and the release of hostages.

Cantet died in Paris on 25 April 2024, at the age of 63. He had been in preparation to direct the new film Enzo, which he cowrote with Campillo; Campillo took over direction on the film, which was released in 2025.

== Filmography ==
Short film

Year	Title	Director	Writer	Notes
1994	Tous à la manif	Yes	Yes	
1995	Jeux de plage	Yes	Yes	
2012	La Fuente	Yes	Yes	Segment of 7 días en La Habana (7 Days in Havana)

Feature film

Year	Title	Director	Writer	Notes
1990	Un été à Beyrouth	Yes		Documentary film
1997	Les Sanguinaires	Yes	Yes	Telefilm
1999	Ressources humaines (Human Resources)	Yes	Yes	
2001	L'Emploi du temps (Time Out)	Yes	Yes	
2005	Vers le sud (Heading South)	Yes	Yes	
2008	Entre les murs (The Class)	Yes	Yes	
2012	Foxfire: Confessions of a Girl Gang	Yes	Yes	
2014	Retour à Ithaque (Return to Ithaca)	Yes	Yes	
2017	L'Atelier (The Workshop)	Yes	Yes	
2021	Arthur Rambo	Yes	Yes	
2025	Enzo	Honored	Yes	Originally intended to be directed by Cantet; taken over by Robin Campillo following Cantet's death, although it still credits Cantet as an honorary director.

Other

Year	Title	Role	Notes
1987	L'Étendu	Cinematographer	Short film
1994	Veillées d'armes : histoire du journalisme en temps de guerre	Assistant director	Documentary film;
1994	Joyeux Noël	Cinematographer	Short film
1998	Cette nuit	Cinematographer	

== Accolades ==
The 2001 film L'Emploi du temps was placed at 99 on Slant Magazine's best films of the 2000s, number 9 of The Guardian's Best Films of the Noughties, and number 11 at The A.V. Club's top 50 films of the 2000s (decade).

In 2015 Cantet received the Volta Career Achievement Award at the Dublin International Film Festival.

Year	Title	Award/Nomination
1999	Ressources humaines (Human Resources)	7 d'Or for Best Screenwriting; Amiens International Film Festival – Prize of the City of Amiens; Amiens International Film Festival – OCIC Award; Buenos Aires International Festival of Independent Cinema – Best Film; Buenos Aires International Festival of Independent Cinema – People's Choice Award; César Award for Best First Feature Film; European Film Award for European Discovery of the Year; French Syndicate of Cinema Critics – Best First French Film; Louis Delluc Prize for Best First Film; San Sebastián International Film Festival – Best New Director; Seattle International Film Festival – New Director's Showcase Award; Thessaloniki International Film Festival – Best Screenplay; Torino Film Festival – Best First Feature Film; Torino Film Festival – Cipputi Award; Nominated—César Award for Best Original Screenplay or Adaptation; Nominated—Silver Condor Award for Best Foreign Film
2001	L'Emploi du temps (Time Out)	Venice Film Festival – Don Quixote Award; Vienna International Film Festival – FIPRESCI Prize; Nominated—Boston Society of Film Critics Award for Best Foreign Language Film (2nd place); Nominated—European Film Award for Best Screenwriter; Nominated—Independent Spirit Award for Best International Film; Nominated—National Society of Film Critics Award for Best Foreign Language Film (3rd place); Nominated—New York Film Critics Circle Award for Best Foreign Language Film (runner-up)
2005	Vers le sud (Heading South)	Venice Film Festival – CinemAvvenire Award; Nominated—Venice Film Festival – Golden Lion
2008	Entre les murs (The Class)	Argentine Academy of Cinematography Arts and Sciences Award for Best Foreign Film; Cannes Film Festival – Palme d'Or; César Award for Best Adaptation; Independent Spirit Award for Best International Film; Lumière Award for Best Film; Lumière World Audience Award; Munich Film Festival – One Future Prize; Silver Condor Award for Best Foreign Film; Nominated—Academy Award for Best Foreign Language Film; Nominated—Bodil Award for Best Non-American Film; Nominated—César Award for Best Film; Nominated—César Award for Best Director; Nominated—David di Donatello for Best European Film; Nominated—European Film Award for Best Director; Nominated—European Film Award for Best Film; Nominated—Film Critics Circle of Australia Award for Best Foreign Language Film; Globes de Cristal Award for Best Film; Nominated—Gopo Award for Best European Film; Nominated—Goya Award for Best European Film; Nominated—Los Angeles Film Critics Association Award for Best Foreign Language Film (2nd place); Nominated—Lumière Award for Best Director; Nominated—Lumière Award for Best Screenplay; Nominated—Nastro d'Argento for Best European Director; Nominated—Prix Jacques Prévert du Scénario for Best Adaptation; Nominated—Toronto Film Critics Association Award for Best Foreign Language Film
2012	7 días en La Habana (7 Days in Havana)	Nominated—Cannes Film Festival – Prix Un certain regard
2012	Foxfire: Confessions of a Girl Gang	Nominated—San Sebastián International Film Festival – Golden Shell
2014	Retour à Ithaque (Return to Ithaca)	Venice Film Festival – Venice Days Award
