= Christophe Beaucarne =

Belgian cinematographer

- Born: 24 September 1965 (age 60); Brussels, Belgium
- Years active: 1988-present

Christophe Beaucarne, SBC is a Belgian cinematographer. He is the son of the poet Julos Beaucarne.

He is a member of Association Française des directeurs de la photographie Cinématographique (AFC). He received the Magritte Award for Best Cinematography for his work in the 2009 film Mr. Nobody. He was nominated for five César Awards for Best Cinematography for Anne Fontaine's Coco Before Chanel (2009), Mathieu Amalric's On Tour (2010), Christophe Gans's Beauty and the Beast (2014), Nicole Garcia's From the Land of the Moon (2016) and Mathieu Amalric's Barbara (2017).

== Filmography ==
Film

Year	Title	Director	Notes
1990	My Father's Glory	Yves Robert	With Robert Alazraki, Eric Vallée and Paco Wiser
1995	Les Anges gardiens	Jean-Marie Poiré	With Jean-Yves Le Mener and Christophe Legal
1997	Nous sommes tous encore ici	Anne-Marie Miéville	With Christophe Pollock and Jean-Paul Rosa da Costa
1998	Riches, belles, etc.	Bunny Godillot	
1998	The Visitors II: The Corridors of Time	Jean-Marie Poiré	
1998	War in the Highlands	Francis Reusser	
1999	Tout baigne!	Eric Civanyan	
1999	The Dilettante	Pascal Thomas	
2000	Modern Life	Laurence Ferreira Barbosa	
2000	Après la réconciliation	Anne-Marie Miéville	
2001	Day Off	Pascal Thomas	
2001	De l'amour	Jean-François Richet	
2001	Le stade de Wimbledon	Mathieu Amalric	
2002	Les femmes... ou les enfants d'abord...	Manuel Poirier	
2002	Le nouveau Jean-Claude	Didier Tronchet	
2003	A Man, a Real One	Arnaud Larrieu; Jean-Marie Larrieu	
2003	The Mystery of the Yellow Room	Bruno Podalydès	
2004	Chemins de traverse	Manuel Poirier	
2005	To Paint or Make Love	Arnaud Larrieu; Jean-Marie Larrieu	
2005	Bye Bye Blackbird	Robinson Savary	
2005	The Perfume of the Lady in Black	Bruno Podalydès	
2006	A Few Days in September	Santiago Amigorena	
2007	Irina Palm	Sam Garbarski	
2007	The Inner Life of Martin Frost	Paul Auster	
2008	Paris	Cédric Klapisch	
2009	Mr. Nobody	Jaco Van Dormael	
2009	Coco Before Chanel	Anne Fontaine	
2010	On Tour	Mathieu Amalric	
2010	Outside the Law	Rachid Bouchareb	
2011	My Piece of the Pie	Cédric Klapisch	
2011	Chicken with Plums	Marjane Satrapi; Vincent Paronnaud	
2012	Superstar	Xavier Giannoli	
2012	Just like a Woman	Rachid Bouchareb	
2013	Une histoire d'amour	Hélène Fillières	
2013	Adoration	Anne Fontaine	
2013	Mood Indigo	Michel Gondry	
2014	Gemma Bovery	Anne Fontaine	
2014	The Blue Room	Mathieu Amalric	
2014	Beauty and the Beast	Christophe Gans	
2015	A Royal Night Out	Julian Jarrold	
2015	The Brand New Testament	Jaco Van Dormael	
2016	Alone in Berlin	Vincent Perez	
2016	From the Land of the Moon	Nicole Garcia	
2017	Rodin	Jacques Doillon	
2017	Django	Étienne Comar	
2017	Maryline	Guillaume Gallienne	
2017	Barbara	Mathieu Amalric	
2019	À cause des filles..?	Pascal Thomas	With Jean-Marc Fabre and Stéphane Le Parc
2019	Dernier amour	Benoît Jacquot	
2019	Carte de visite	Michel Zumpf	With Alan Guichaoua, Eden Lagaly-Faynot, Claire Mathon and Antoine Sanier
2019	Le milieu de l'horizon	Delphine Lehericey	
2020	Lovers	Nicole Garcia	
2021	Suzanna Andler	Benoît Jacquot	
2021	Hold Me Tight	Mathieu Amalric	
2021	Lost Illusions	Xavier Giannoli	
2022	En roue libre	Didier Barcelo	
2022	Habib, la grande aventure	Benoît Mariage	
2024	Boléro	Anne Fontaine	

== Awards and nominations ==
César Awards

Year	Title	Category	Result
2009	Coco Before Chanel	Best Cinematography	Nominated
2010	On Tour	Best Cinematography	Nominated
2014	Beauty and the Beast	Best Cinematography	Nominated
2016	From the Land of the Moon	Best Cinematography	Nominated
2017	Barbara	Best Cinematography	Nominated
2021	Lost Illusions	Best Cinematography	Won

Lumière Awards

Year	Title	Category	Result
2013	Mood Indigo	Best Cinematography	Nominated
2016	From the Land of the Moon	Best Cinematography	Nominated
2017	Barbara	Best Cinematography	Won

Magritte Awards

Year	Title	Category	Result
2009	Mr. Nobody	Best Cinematography	Won
2013	Mood Indigo	Best Cinematography	Nominated
2015	The Brand New Testament	Best Cinematography	Nominated

Manaki Brothers Film Festival

Year	Title	Category	Result
2009	Mr. Nobody	Golden Camera Award for Outstanding Technical Contribution	Won
2009	Mr. Nobody	Golden Camera Award Best Cinematography	Nominated

Stockholm International Film Festival

Year	Title	Category	Result
2009	Mr. Nobody	Best Cinematography	Won
