= Le Brio =

- Theatrical release poster
- Directed by: Yvan Attal
- Written by: Yaël Langmann; Victor Saint Macary; Yvan Attal; Noé Debré; Bryan Marciano
- Produced by: Dimitri Rassam; Benjamin Elalouf
- Starring: Daniel Auteuil; Camélia Jordana
- Cinematography: Rémy Chevrin
- Edited by: Célia Lafitedupont
- Music by: Michael Brooks
- Production companies: Chapter 2 France 2 Cinéma; Moonshaker; Nexus Factory
- Distributed by: Pathé
- Release date: 22 November 2017
- Running time: 95 minutes
- Country: France
- Language: French
- Budget: $11.1 million
- Box office: $10.9 million

Le Brio is a 2017 French comedy film directed by Yvan Attal.

== Plot ==
Neïla lives in the Paris suburb Créteil with her mother and grandmother. She enrolls herself into Panthéon-Assas University in the hopes of becoming a lawyer, but meets with public humiliation tainted with racism from the controversial professor Mazard when she arrives late for one of his lectures. The incident finds its way online, and the dean of the law school catches wind of the incident and steps in, only to task the professor, as a means to make amends, to mentor Neïla for an upcoming debating/public speaking contest. Although Neïla finds Mazard cynical and exacting, she learns from him, and both of them have to overcome their prejudices during the course of working together.

== Cast ==
- Daniel Auteuil as Pierre Mazard, professor of law
- Camélia Jordana as Neïla Salah, law student
- Yasin Houicha as Mounir, Neïla's boyfriend, and driver
- Nozha Khouadra as Neïla's mother
- Nicolas Vaude as the Président de Paris II-Panthéon Assas
- Jean-Baptiste Lafarge as Benjamin, a law student
- Claude Perron as the woman walking her dog
- Virgil Leclaire as Keufran, a friend of Neïla
- Zohra Benali as the grandmother of Neïla
- Damien Zanoly as Jean Proutot, a law student
- Jean-Philippe Puymartin as the chair of the competition
- Paulette Joly as Madame Mazard

== Background ==
The film was shot in Paris, at Panthéon-Assas University, Nanterre University, the Sorbonne and the Sainte-Geneviève Library in the 5th arrondissement. The scenes in the Paris métro where Neïla has to talk to indifferent passengers were filmed on the 3bis metro line.

Camélia Jordana received the César Award for Best Female Revelation in 2018; the film itself and Daniel Auteuil were also both nominated for the Césars.
