= The Sower (2017 film) =

- Directed by: Marine Francen
- Written by: Marine Francen; Jacqueline Surchat; Jacques Fieschi
- Starring: Pauline Burlet; Géraldine Pailhas; Alban Lenoir; Iliana Zabeth; Françoise Lebrun
- Cinematography: Alain Duplantier
- Edited by: Minori Akimoto
- Release date: 15 November 2017 (France)
- Running time: 98 minutes
- Countries: Belgium; France
- Language: French

The Sower is a 2017 France-Belgium co-production written and directed by Marine Francen and based on the short story L'homme semence by Violette Ailhaud. Set in 1851, The Sower takes place in a village where the women have been left on their own after all the men were rounded up in order to prevent an uprising. The film premiered at the San Sebastián International Film Festival in 2017 and was released in the U.S. in 2019.

== Plot ==
During the French coup d'état of 1851, all the adult men of a small rural village are rounded up, leaving the women behind to fend for themselves. After months pass with no word from the men, the women believe they are dead and become concerned that no men at all have passed through the village. The younger women make a pact that if a man should come through, they will share him equally so that they might have children. They further pledge to only sleep with the man if he agrees to sleep with all of them.

In the summer a blacksmith, Jean, arrives looking for work. The women give him shelter, at first tentatively, not willing to admit that they are alone. However Violette, the young woman chosen to look after him, admits that all the men have been arrested and learns in return that Napoleon has declared himself emperor, and that all the prisoners have either died or been deported. Violette asks Jean not to tell the other women.

Jean decides to stay to help the women with the harvest. He seems to show a preference for Violette, and the other women who have made the pact with her urge Violette to seduce Jean so that he will stay.

Violette and Jean become lovers, and soon the other women begin to pressure Violette to remember their pact and to bring up the subject with Jean. Reluctantly she does. Jean is disgusted with the idea and Violette tells him he has the option to leave. After he disappears for a day, Violette goes through his things and discovers that he is in hiding and thus cannot leave. Returning, he agrees to sleep with the other women and honour Violette's pact.

Even as he sleeps with the other women, Violette and Jean stay intimate. He reveals to her that he killed a man and is now wanted, and must leave France. After Violette becomes pregnant, the first of the women to do so, Jean asks Violette to depart with him.

After two years, some of the men begin returning home. The women realize that the returning men will judge them and their children. To keep the secret of the paternity of the children, a village elder tells Violette that Jean must leave. Violette initially intends to go with him. But Jean, realizing that his future is uncertain, and that Violette has a strong and supportive community around her, departs the village unannounced, leaving Violette a letter explaining himself and promising to write once he is settled.

== Reception ==
On Rotten Tomatoes the film has an approval rating of 100% based on reviews from 18 critics.
