= C'est la vie! (2017 film) =

2017 French comedy film

C'est la Vie!
- Film poster
- Directed by: Éric Toledano; Olivier Nakache
- Written by: Éric Toledano; Olivier Nakache
- Produced by: Nicolas Duval Adassovsky; Laurent Zeitoun; Yann Zenou
- Starring: Jean-Pierre Bacri; Gilles Lellouche; Jean-Paul Rouve; Vincent Macaigne; Alban Ivanov; Suzanne Clément
- Cinematography: David Chizallet
- Edited by: Dorian Rigal-Ansous
- Music by: Avishai Cohen
- Distributed by: Gaumont
- Release date: 5 July 2017
- Running time: 117 minutes
- Country: France
- Language: French
- Budget: $16 million
- Box office: $30.5 million

C'est la Vie! (French: Le Sens de la fête) is a 2017 French comedy film written and directed by Éric Toledano and Olivier Nakache. It was screened in the Gala Presentations section at the 2017 Toronto International Film Festival.

== Plot ==
Wedding planner/caterer Max is staging a wedding at a 17th-century chateau, in the course of which he must deal with a volatile, often foul-mouthed assistant, missing staff, incompetent waiters, a demanding, egocentric groom, an iffy electrical system, a rebellious substitute DJ, and a whole lot more.

Interwoven with his professional woes are his personal ones. He is on a trial separation from his wife and his French grammarian brother-in-law, who is also one of his waiters, is a former admirer of the bride. Max's other assistant is his mistress, who threatens to end their relationship and starts hitting on one of the waiters to prove it. And it's Max's birthday.

At the end of a string of safely negotiated disasters a runaway fireworks display and a crashed electrical system at the height of the event finally make Max give up in despair and walk away, only to discover that his staff have improvised to create an original wedding celebration.

== Cast ==
- Jean-Pierre Bacri as Max
- Gilles Lellouche as James
- Jean-Paul Rouve as Guy
- Vincent Macaigne as Julien
- Alban Ivanov as Samy
- Suzanne Clément as Josiane
- Eye Haïdara as Adèle
- Hélène Vincent as Geneviève
- Benjamin Lavernhe as Pierre
- Judith Chemla as Héléna
- William Lebghil as Seb
- Kévin Azaïs as Patrice
- Antoine Chappey as Henri

== Reception ==
On review aggregator website Rotten Tomatoes, the film has an approval rating of 81% based on 36 reviews, and an average rating of 6.9/10.
