= Redoubtable (film) =

2017 film by Michel Hazanavicius

- Theatrical release poster
- French: Le Redoutable
- Directed by: Michel Hazanavicius
- Screenplay by: Michel Hazanavicius
- Based on: Un an après by Anne Wiazemsky
- Produced by: Florence Gastaud; Michel Hazanavicius; Riad Sattouf
- Starring: Louis Garrel; Stacy Martin
- Cinematography: Guillaume Schiffman
- Edited by: Anne-Sophie Bion; Michel Hazanavicius
- Production companies: Les Compagnons du Cinéma; La Classe Américaine; France 3 Cinéma; StudioCanal
- Distributed by: StudioCanal
- Release dates: 21 May 2017 (Cannes); 13 September 2017 (France)
- Running time: 107 minutes
- Country: France
- Language: French
- Budget: $12.2 million
- Box office: $1.3 million

Redoubtable (French: Le Redoutable), released in the United States as Godard Mon Amour, is a 2017 French biographical comedy-drama film written and directed by Michel Hazanavicius about the affair of filmmaker Jean-Luc Godard with actress Anne Wiazemsky in the late 1960s, during the making of his film La Chinoise (1967). It was selected to compete for the Palme d'Or in the main competition section at the 2017 Cannes Film Festival.

== Cast ==
- Louis Garrel as Jean-Luc Godard
- Stacy Martin as Anne Wiazemsky
- Bérénice Bejo as Michèle Rosier
- Micha Lescot as Jean-Pierre Bamberger
- Grégory Gadebois as Michel Cournot
- Guido Caprino as Bernardo Bertolucci
- Quentin Dolmaire as Paul

== Reception ==
On the review aggregator website Rotten Tomatoes, the film has an approval rating of 54% based on 89 reviews, and an average rating of 5.8/10. The website's critics consensus reads, "Godard Mon Amour imagines a chapter from Jean-Luc Godard's life with no shortage of whimsy, but lacks its subject's essential inspiration." On Metacritic, the film has a weighted average score of 55 out of 100, based on 24 critics, indicating "generally favorable reviews".
