= The Guardians (2017 film) =

2017 film

- Theatrical release poster
- French: Les gardiennes
- Directed by: Xavier Beauvois
- Written by: Xavier Beauvois
- Produced by: Sylvie Pialat; Benoît Quainon
- Starring: Nathalie Baye
- Cinematography: Caroline Champetier
- Edited by: Marie-Julie Maille
- Music by: Michel Legrand
- Distributed by: Pathé
- Release dates: 8 September 2017 (TIFF); 6 December 2017 (France)
- Running time: 138 minutes
- Country: France
- Language: French
- Budget: $10.5 million
- Box office: $4,167,608

The Guardians (French: Les gardiennes, "The female guardians") is a 2017 French drama film directed and written by Xavier Beauvois. It was screened in the Special Presentations section at the 2017 Toronto International Film Festival.

== Plot ==
The film is set on a farm in the Limousin region of central France during, and just after, the First World War. With her two sons Georges and Constant, and son-in-law, Clovis, serving in the army, Hortense Sandrail employs Francine Riant, a young woman brought up in an orphanage to help on the farm. Her daughter Solange also lives on the farm but she mainly works in the house.

Clovis returns briefly and is a changed man. Later he becomes a prisoner of war. Francine shares a room with young Marguerite, who is in love with Georges, who also visits her whilst on leave. Georges, however, is attracted to Francine and asks her to write to him when he returns to the front. She does, but Marguerite comes across the letters and is angry.

Constant dies in the war.

Americans set up base nearby and trade with the farm. One man appears to have an affair with Solange and gossip starts in the village about women on the farm.

Georges has sex with Francine and she expects their relationship to deepen.

Hortense searches for her daughter and sees something suspicious in the woods. Just as he is leaving for the front, Georges sees Francine struggling to free herself from the attentions of a young American soldier and believes her to be unfaithful to him. When Georges returns to the front Hortense chooses to tell him that Francine is a hussy. He says she should be sacked if that is the case.

Hortense sacks Francine, offering a reference and two months' pay. Francine wants to know why as she has worked hard for two years and done nothing wrong. She says this must be because Hortense wants Georges to marry Marguerite. Hortense confronts Solange about what she saw in the woods. Solange says she and the American only kissed. She thought of her husband and could not do more. Solange says Hortense was cruel to sack Francine but Hortense says she did so to protect her reputation as gossip was flying round the village.

Francine gets a job with a woman and makes charcoal. The woman notices that Francine is pregnant. Eventually, Francine writes to Hortense to say that Georges has not replied to her letters and that she is to have his child. Hortense burns the letter.

Georges returns from the front and is met by his mother and Marguerite. Meantime, Francine has the baby and cuts her long red hair into a bob. The baby is baptised. The man from the Council who passed on her school certificate and an allowance when she left the orphanage, is a godparent. Hortense sees them leave the church in a carriage and appears taken aback.

Clovis returns. The Americans left behind machinery which Hortense and Solange bought. Clovis is impressed. Georges and Clovis argue over who will do what - cultivate the fields or the woods. Solange is angry as this was Constant's land and he is dead with no grave and all his brothers can do is argue. Hortense says the old life is returning: the children bicker and she likes it that way.

By 1920, Francine is singing with a local band. A man in the crowd is captivated.

== Cast ==
- Nathalie Baye as Hortense
- Iris Bry as Francine
- Laura Smet as Solange
- Cyril Descours as Georges
- Gilbert Bonneau as Henri
- Olivier Rabourdin as Clovis
- Nicolas Giraud as Constant

== Reception ==
As of June 2020, on review aggregator website Rotten Tomatoes, the film holds an approval rating of 95%, based on 56 reviews, and an average rating of 7.6/10. The website's critical consensus reads, "The Guardians proves that the oft-unraveled canvas of World War I still has fresh stories to tell — and adds another gorgeously filmed entry to Xavier Beauvois' filmography." On Metacritic, the film has a weighted average score of 81 out of 100, based on 15 critics, indicating "universal acclaim".
