= Venice Film Festival Award for Best Screenplay =

Italian film award

Best Screenplay
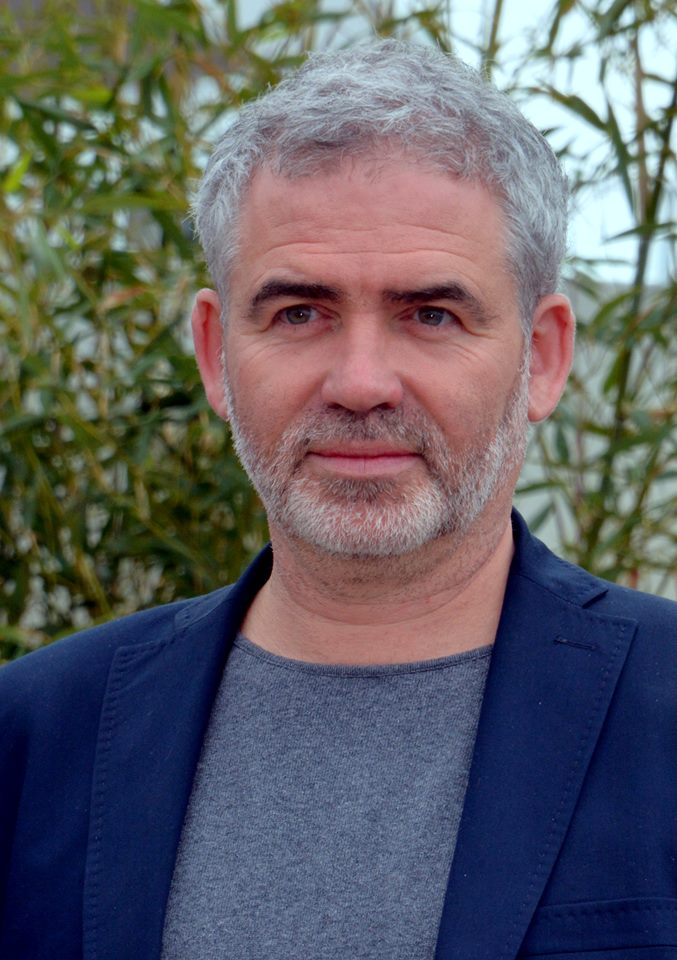
- 2026 co-recipient: Stéphane Brizé
- Location: Venice
- Country: Italy
- Presented by: Venice Film Festival
- First award: 1937
- Currently held by: Coralie Amedeo, Stéphane Brizé, Olivier Gorce for A Good Little Soldier (2026)
- Website: labiennale.org/en/cinema

The Best Screenplay Award is an annual award presented for best screenwriting achievements in a feature film in the official competition section of the Venice Film Festival. It was introduced in 1937 by the festival's organizing committee and was awarded irregularly over the years.

Coralie Amedeo, Stéphane Brizé and Olivier Gorce were the most recent winners for A Good Little Soldier (2026), at the 83rd Venice International Film Festival.

== History ==
The prize was first awarded to Sacha Guitry and Christian-Jaque for The Pearls of the Crown (1937) at the 5th edition.

After some irregularly presence throughout the festival's history, since 2013 the prize is been awarded regularly by the main competition jury.

Irish filmmaker Martin McDonagh has won twice, for Three Billboards Outside Ebbing, Missouri (2017) and The Banshees of Inisherin (2023).

== Winners ==
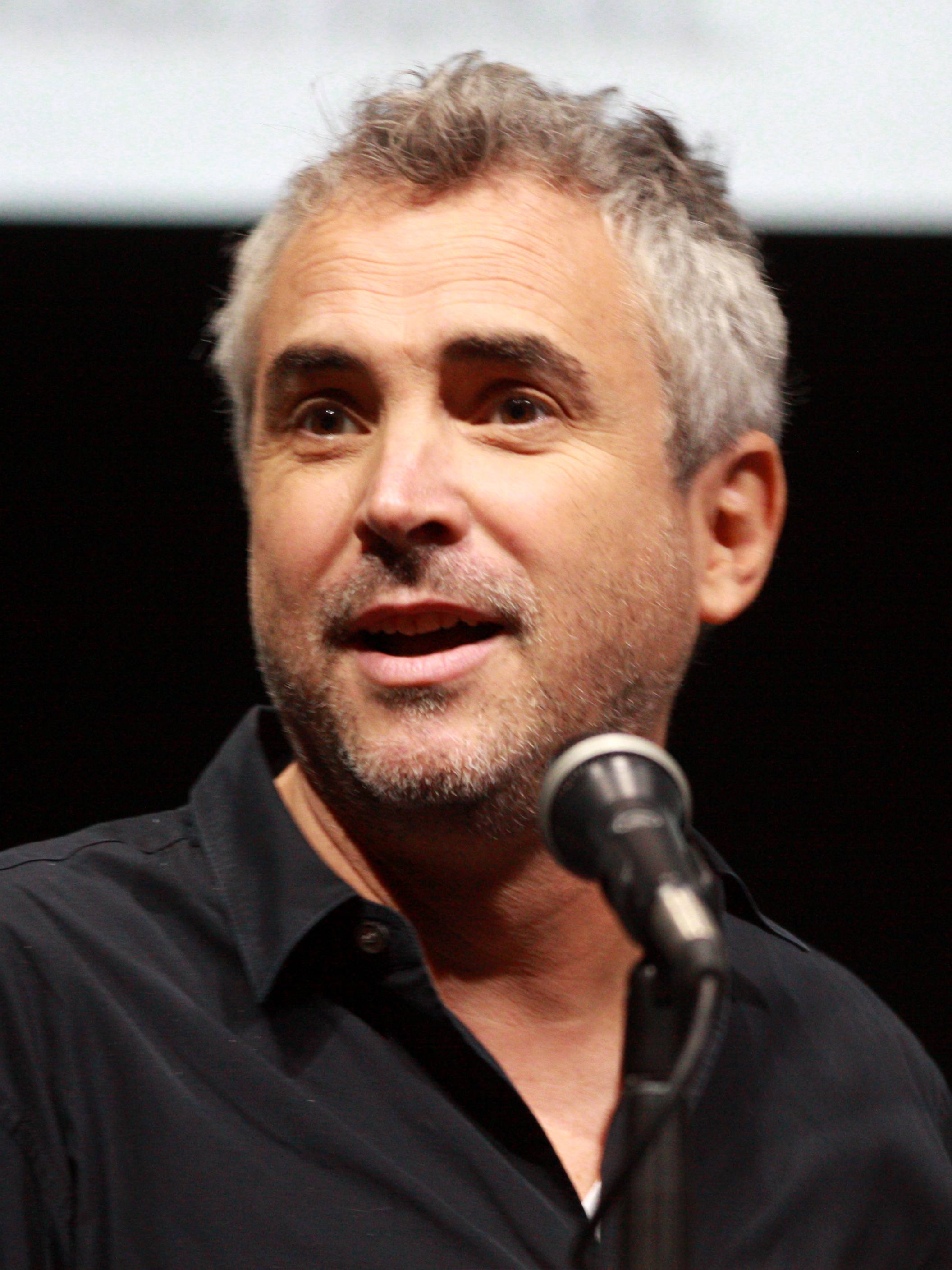
Alfonso Cuarón won for Y tu mamá también (2001)

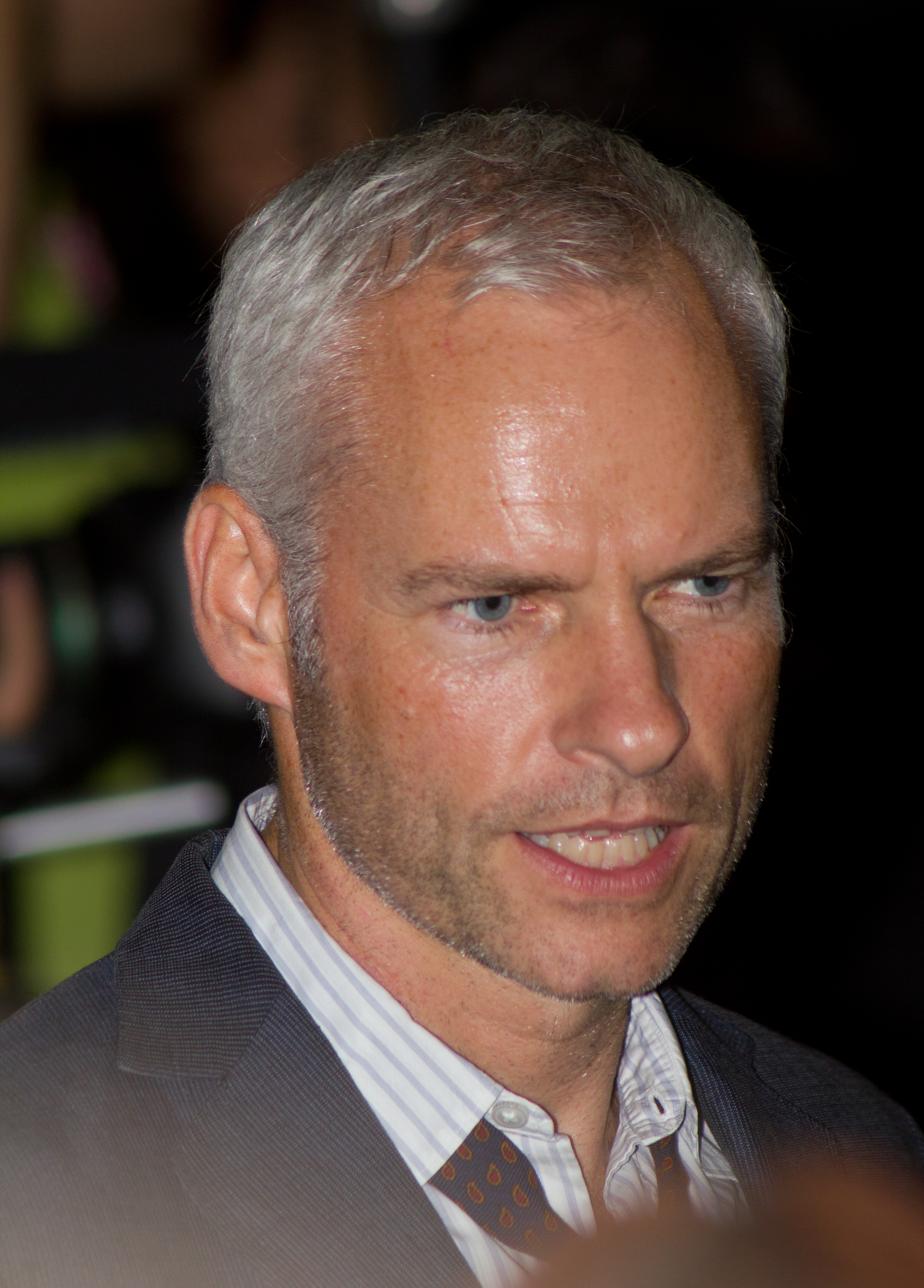
Martin McDonagh won twice, for Three Billboards Outside Ebbing, Missouri (2017) and The Banshees of Inisherin (2023)

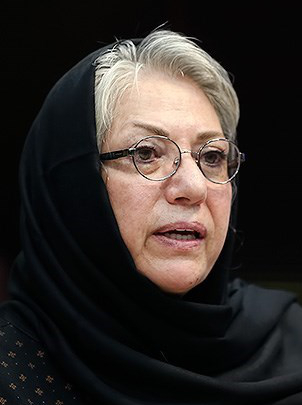
Rakhshān Banietemad won for Tales (2014)

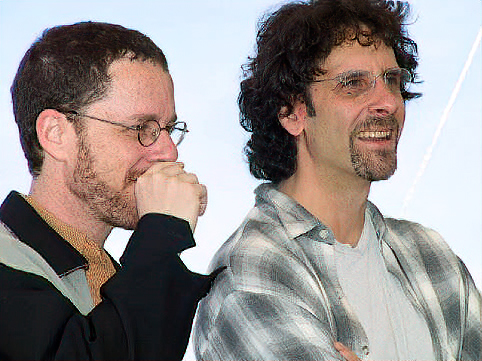
Joel and Ethan Coen won for The Ballad of Buster Scruggs (2018)

Maggie Gyllenhaal won for The Lost Daughter (2021)

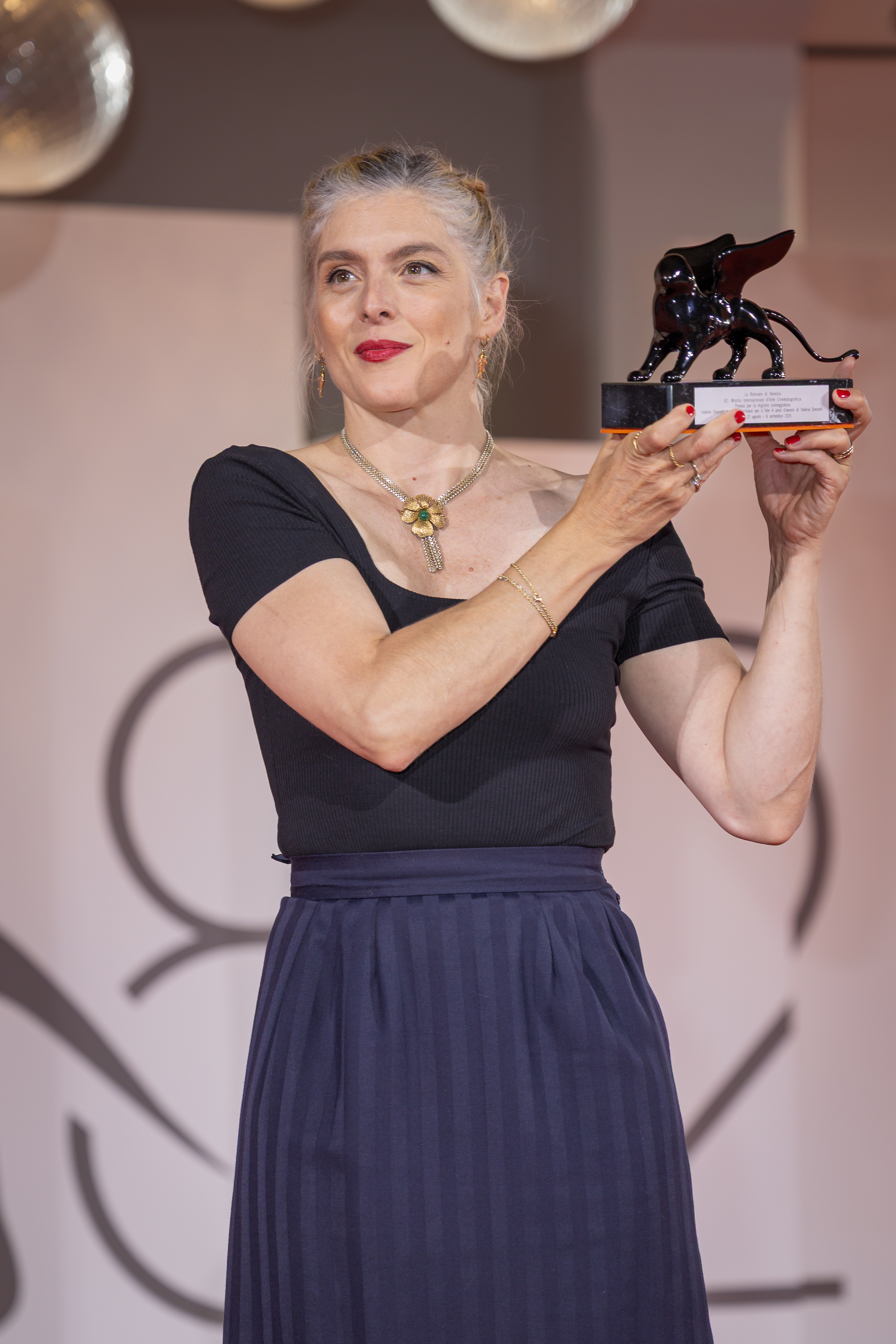
Valérie Donzelli won for At Work (2025)

=== 1930s ===
Year	Writer(s)	English Title	Original Title
1937	Sacha Guitry and Christian-Jaque	The Pearls of the Crown	Les perles de la couronne

=== 1940s ===
Year	Writer(s)	English Title	Original Title
1947	Grigori Aleksandrov, Moris Slobodskoy and Aleksandr Raskin	Springtime	Весна
1948	Graham Greene	The Fallen Idol	
1949	Jacques Tati	The Big Day	Jour de fête

=== 1950s ===
Year	Writer(s)	English Title	Original Title
1950	Jacques Natanson and Max Ophüls	La Ronde	
1951	T. E. B. Clarke	The Lavender Hill Mob	
1952	Nunnally Johnson	Phone Call from a Stranger	

=== 1990s ===
Year	Writer(s)	English Title	Original Title
1990	Helle Ryslinge	Sirup	

=== 2000s ===
Year	Writer(s)	English Title	Original Title	Ref.
2000	Claudio Fava, Marco Tullio Giordana and Monica Zapelli	One Hundred Steps	I cento passi	
2001	Alfonso Cuarón and Carlos Cuarón	Y tu mamá también		

=== 2010s ===
Year	Writer(s)	English Title	Original Title	Ref.
2013	Steve Coogan and Jeff Pope	Philomena		
2014	Rakhshān Banietemad	Tales	قصه‌ها	
2015	Christian Vincent	Courted	L'Hermine	
2016	Noah Oppenheim	Jackie		
2017	Martin McDonagh	Three Billboards Outside Ebbing, Missouri		
2018	Joel and Ethan Coen	The Ballad of Buster Scruggs		
2019	Yonfan	No.7 Cherry Lane	繼園臺七號	

=== 2020s ===
Year	Writer(s)	English Title	Original Title	Ref.
2020	Chaitanya Tamhane	The Disciple		
2021	Maggie Gyllenhaal	The Lost Daughter		
2022	Martin McDonagh	The Banshees of Inisherin		
2023	Guillermo Calderón and Pablo Larraín	El Conde		
2024	Murilo Hauser and Heitor Lorega	I'm Still Here	Ainda Estou Aqui	
2025	Valérie Donzelli and Gilles Marchand	At Work	À pied d'œuvre	
2026	Coralie Amedeo, Stéphane Brizé and Olivier Gorce	A Good Little Soldier	Un bon petit soldat	

== Multiple Winners ==
The following individuals received two or more Best Screenplay awards:

Number of Wins	Writer	Films
2	Martin McDonagh	Three Billboards Outside Ebbing, Missouri (2017) and The Banshees of Inisherin (2022)

== See also ==
- Golden Osella (until 2012)
- Cannes Film Festival Award for Best Screenplay
- Berlin Film Festival Award for Best Screenplay
