= Philippe Laudenbach =

French actor (1936–2024)

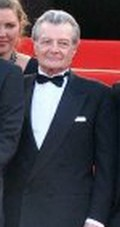
- Laudenbach in 2010
- Born: 31 January 1936; Bourg-la-Reine, France
- Died: 22 April 2024 (aged 88); Toulouse, France
- Occupation: Actor
- Years active: 1963–2024

Philippe Laudenbach (31 January 1936 – 22 April 2024) was a French actor. He appeared in more than one hundred films from 1963.

== Career ==
Philippe Laudenbach, the nephew of Pierre Fresnay (born Peter Laudenbach), was trained at the French National Academy of Dramatic Arts. He earned a nomination for the Molière Award for Best Supporting Actor in 1998 for his notable performance in Luigi Pirandello's play The Crazy's Hat.

== Personal life ==
Laudenbach was married to Francine Walter, actress and drama teacher at La Bruyère and the Théâtre de l'Atelier. He died on 22 April 2024, at the age of 88.

== Filmography ==
Year	Title	Role	Director	Notes
1963	Muriel	Robert	Alain Resnais	
1964	Les hommes	Rollin	Albert Riéra	TV movie
1966	Un beau dimanche	Agent	François Villiers	TV movie
1970	Mon Faust	The disciple	Daniel Georgeot	TV movie
1970	Au théâtre ce soir	Ugo	Pierre Sabbagh	TV series (1 episode)
1973	David, la nuit tombe	Peregrine Jones	André Barsacq	TV movie
1973	L'éducation sentimentale	Boffreu	Marcel Cravenne	TV mini-series
1973	Témoignages	The doctor	Bernard Toublanc-Michel	TV series (1 episode)
1973	Le jardinier	The Town Hall's owner	Antoine-Léonard Maestrati	TV movie
1974	Président Faust	Our life's player	Jean Kerchbron	TV movie
1974	La dernière carte	Swoboda	Marcel Cravenne	TV movie
1975	Marie-Antoinette	Joseph II	Guy Lefranc	TV mini-series
1976	Adios	Father Cahuzac	André Michel	TV mini-series
1977	Un tueur, un flic, ainsi soit-il...	The industrial's advisor	Jean-Louis van Belle	
1977	Messieurs les jurés	Lawyer	André Michel	TV series (1 episode)
1977	Les samedis de l'histoire	Frankel	Serge Moati	TV series (1 episode)
1978	Ciné-roman	M. Fauche	Serge Moati	TV movie
1978	Jean-Christophe	Lucien Lévy-Coeur	François Villiers	TV series
1978	Les procès témoins de leur temps		Jeannette Hubert	TV series (1 episode)
1979	Ego	Rémi	Jean-Marie Marcel	TV movie
1980	My American Uncle	Michel Aubert	Alain Resnais	
1980	Mont-Oriol	Curist	Serge Moati	TV movie
1980	La fortune des Rougon	The attorney	Yves-André Hubert	TV mini-series
1980	Fantômas	M. Thomery	Juan Luis Buñuel	TV mini-series
1980	Les dossiers de l'écran	Commandant Picquart	Alain Dhénaut	TV series (1 episode)
1981	Les fils de la liberté	Plessis	Claude Boissol	TV mini-series
1982	L'indiscrétion	Boutté	Pierre Lary	
1982	La baraka	The journalist	Jean Valère	
1982	Malesherbes, avocat du roi	Bondy's delegate	Yves-André Hubert	TV movie
1982	Sherlock Holmes	Dr. Watson	Jean Hennin	TV movie
1982	Commissaire Moulin	Prosecutor Valeri	Claude Boissol	TV series (1 episode)
1983	Life Is a Bed of Roses	The educator	Alain Resnais	
1983	La bête noire	The psychologist	Patrick Chaput	
1983	Confidentially Yours	Lawyer Clement	François Truffaut	
1983	Par ordre du Roy	Monseigneur de Noailles	Michel Mitrani	TV movie
1983	Quelques hommes de bonne volonté		François Villiers	TV mini-series
1984	Viva la vie	Professor Sternberg	Claude Lelouch	
1984	Our Story	Sam	Bertrand Blier	
1984	Souvenirs, souvenirs	Fressynet	Ariel Zeitoun	
1984	Rive droite, rive gauche	The host	Philippe Labro	
1984	La jeune femme en vert	Fournier	Lazare Iglesis	TV movie
1984	Un homme va être assassiné	Merizier	Dolorès Grassian	TV movie
1985	Contes clandestins	François Mascal	Dominique Crèvecoeur	
1985	Passage secret		Laurent Perrin	
1985	Vive la mariée	Sénéchal	Jean Valère	TV movie
1985	Entre chats et loups	Commissioner	François Porcile	TV movie
1986	Betty Blue	The editor	Jean-Jacques Beineix	
1986	Black Mic Mac	Boyer	Thomas Gilou	
1986	Désordre	Gabriel's father	Olivier Assayas	
1986	Nazi Hunter: The Beate Klarsfeld Story	French Official	Michael Lindsay-Hogg	TV movie
1986	La guerre des femmes	Cardinal Mazarin	Pierre Bureau	TV series
1986	Maguy	André	Georges Bensoussan	TV series (1 episode)
1986	Julien Fontanes, magistrat	Father Marc Bolleret	André Farwagi	TV series (1 episode)
1986–88	Espionne et tais-toi		Claude Boissol	TV series (4 episodes)
1987	Four Adventures of Reinette and Mirabelle	The waiter	Éric Rohmer	
1987	Travelling avant	Julien Duvivier's lookalike	Jean-Charles Tacchella	
1987	La reine de la jungle	Bardet	Peter Kassovitz	TV movie
1987	Les enquêtes Caméléon	Faure	Philippe Monnier	TV series (1 episode)
1988	Quelques jours avec moi	Monsieur Maillotte	Claude Sautet	
1988	Vivement lundi		Several	TV series
1988	La chaîne	The prefect	Claude Faraldo	TV mini-series
1989	La salle de bain	Hotel Customer	John Lvoff	
1989	L'ingénieur aimait trop les chiffres	Lhuillier	Michel Favart	TV movie
1989	Liberté, Libertés	Bouillé	Jean-Dominique de La Rochefoucauld	TV movie
1989	Manon Roland	Vergniaud	Édouard Molinaro	TV movie
1989	La grande cabriole	Jules	Nina Companeez	TV mini-series
1989	The Free Frenchman	General Chevalier	Jim Goddard	TV mini-series
1989	Imogène		François Leterrier	TV series (1 episode)
1989	Le masque	Auguste	Hervé Baslé	TV series (1 episode)
1989–90	Si Guitry m'était conté		Yves-André Hubert & Alain Dhénaut	TV series (4 episodes)
1990	Héritage oblige	M. Rozier	Daniel Losset & Maurice Frydland	TV series
1990	La belle Anglaise	Forestier	Jacques Besnard	TV series (1 episode)
1991	L'Opération Corned-Beef	Minister of the Interior	Jean-Marie Poiré	
1991	De par chez nous		François Bures	Short
1991	Les hordes	Vermeer	Jean-Claude Missiaen	TV mini-series
1991	Le Gorille	Livotti	Peter Patzak	TV series (1 episode)
1992	L'affût	Mr Tremblay	Yannick Bellon	
1992	The Sentinel	The Priest	Arnaud Desplechin	
1992	La femme abandonnée	The Earl of Lussanges	Édouard Molinaro	TV movie
1992	Urgence d'aimer	Henri	Philippe Le Guay	TV movie
1993	Drôles d'oiseaux	Robert	Peter Kassovitz	
1993	Rhésus Roméo		Philippe Le Guay	TV movie
1993	Une femme sans histoire	Bernard	Alain Tasma	TV movie
1993	La dame de lieudit	The prefect	Philippe Monnier	TV movie
1993	Antoine Rives, juge du terrorisme	The presiding judge	Philippe Lefebvre	TV series (1 episode)
1993	Nestor Burma	Professor Levasseur	Henri Helman	TV series (1 episode)
1994	Le wagon	Gilles	Charlotte Walior	Short
1994	André Baston contre le professeur Diziak	Chief	Laurent Ardoint, Stéphane Duprat & Florence Roux	Short
1994	Honorin et l'enfant prodigue	The prefect	Jean Chapot	TV movie
1994	Des enfants dans les arbres	The priest	Pierre Boutron	TV movie
1994	Jalna	Ernest	Philippe Monnier	TV mini-series
1995	L'année Juliette		Philippe Le Guay	
1995	L'affaire Dreyfus	Bernard Lazare	Yves Boisset	TV movie
1996	Unpredictable Nature of the River	Nicolas de Saint-James	Bernard Giraudeau	
1996	Nord pour mémoire, avant de le perdre		Isabelle Ingold & Vivianne Perelmuter	Short
1997	Féminin masculine	Dorlaville	Michaëla Watteaux	TV movie
1997	La sauvageonne	Monsieur de la Rosière	Stéphane Bertin	TV movie
1998	Le Radeau de la Méduse	Julien Schmaltz	Iradj Azimi	
1999	Je règle mon pas sur le pas de mon père	The scammer	Rémi Waterhouse	
1999	La vie ne me fait pas peur	Philippe's father	Noémie Lvovsky	
1999	Psy Show	The psychoanalyst	Marina de Van	Short
1999	Le boiteux: Baby blues	Dr. Joseph Brant	Paule Zajdermann	TV movie
1999	La rivale	Molyneux	Alain Nahum	TV movie
1999	Dossier: disparus	Richard Villeroy	Paolo Barzman	TV series (1 episode)
1999	La crim'	Tessier's father	Miguel Courtois	TV series (1 episode)
2000	La bostella	Jacky	Édouard Baer	
2000	La chambre des magiciennes	The old doctor	Claude Miller	TV movie
2000	Une femme neuve	Luc	Didier Albert	TV movie
2001	God Is Great and I'm Not	Jean	Pascale Bailly	
2001	Tanguy	Lawyer Badinier	Étienne Chatiliez	
2001	Un pique-nique chez Osiris	Anatole Ancelin	Nina Companeez	TV movie
2002	Maléfique	Lassalle	Eric Valette	
2003	Clémence	Monsieur Salmon	Pascal Chaumeil	TV movie
2004	Cash Truck	The Mummy	Nicolas Boukhrief	
2004	People	Professor Chernot	Fabien Onteniente	
2004	Arsène Lupin	The prefect	Jean-Paul Salomé	
2004	Avocats & associés	Judge Eckersberg	Olivier Barma & Patrice Martineau	TV series (2 episodes)
2005	Propriété commune	The veterinarian	Michel Leray	Short
2005	Joséphine, ange gardien	Paul-Henri Girod	David Delrieux	TV series (1 episode)
2006	L'État de Grace	The server	Pascal Chaumeil	TV mini-series
2007	René Bousquet ou Le grand arrangement	Jean Leguay	Laurent Heynemann	TV movie
2007	Agathe contre Agathe	Professor Marcenac	Thierry Binisti	TV movie
2007	L'âge de l'amour	Jean Pierre	Olivier Lorelle	TV movie
2007	Le réveillon des bonnes	Father Dubreuil	Michel Hassan	TV mini-series
2007	Chez Maupassant	The narrator	Laurent Heynemann	TV series (1 episode)
2007	Les prédateurs	François Mitterrand	Lucas Belvaux	TV series (1 episode)
2008	Ça se soigne?	Doctor Bertrand Lavoisière	Laurent Chouchan	
2008	Cortex	Daniel	Nicolas Boukhrief	
2008	Bouquet final	The general	Michel Delgado	
2008	Françoise Dolto, le désir de vivre	Rutène	Serge Le Péron	TV movie
2008	Un vrai papa Noël	Grandfather	José Pinheiro	TV movie
2009	Leaving	Samuel's father	Catherine Corsini	
2009	J'ai oublié de te dire	Doctor Simon	Laurent Vinas-Raymond	
2009	The Bed by the Window	Max	Michaël Barocas	Short
2009	L'affaire Salengro	Charles Maurras	Yves Boisset	TV movie
2009	12 balles dans la peau pour Pierre Laval	Mongibeaux	Yves Boisset	TV movie
2009	Les Bleus		Christophe Douchand	TV series (1 episode)
2010	Of Gods and Men	Célestin	Xavier Beauvois	
2010	Romantics Anonymous	Jury president	Jean-Pierre Améris	
2010	Bittersweet Symphony	Darius	Jordi Avalos	Short
2010	Les châtaigniers du désert	Pastor Poujol	Caroline Huppert	TV mini-series
2010	Au siècle de Maupassant	Raymond de la Beyssière	Claude Chabrol	TV series (1 episode)
2011	Declaration of War	Philippe	Valérie Donzelli	
2011	Vourdalak	Philippe de Villedieu	Frédérique Moreau	Short
2011	Louis la brocante	Taillandier	Pierre Sisser	TV series (1 episode)
2011	Famille d'accueil	Aurélien	Bertrand Arthuys	TV series (2 episodes)
2011	Braquo	Lucien	Eric Valette	TV series (2 episodes)
2012	A.L.F.	Yann's father	Jérôme Lescure	
2012	Just Like Brothers	Grandfather	Hugo Gélin	
2012	Hand in Hand	The Minister	Valérie Donzelli	
2012	Naked Soles	Henri Delaude	Jean-Luc Ormières & Aleksandra Szczepanowska	Short
2012	Le fil d'Ariane		Marion Laine	TV movie
2012	Climats	Edmond Marcenat	Caroline Huppert	TV movie
2012	Injustice	Maurice Eckerberg	Benoît d'Aubert	TV series (1 episode)
2012	Inquisitio	Arnavi	Nicolas Cuche	TV series (8 episodes)
2013	Ordalie		Marya Yaborskaya	Short
2013	Guet-apens	Jacques	Michaël Barocas	Short
2013	Petit matin	The husband	Christophe Loizillon	Short
2013	Détectives	Professor Guez	Lorenzo Gabriele	TV series (1 episode)
2014	Fever	René	Raphaël Neal	
2014	Barbecue	Jean Chevalier	Éric Lavaine	
2014	The Price of Fame	The prosecutor	Xavier Beauvois	
2014	Puzzle	The Old man	Rémy Rondeau	Short
2014	Les rides	Marcel	Catherine Breton	Short
2014	Pilules bleues	The mammoth (voice)	Jean-Philippe Amar	TV movie
2014	La clinique du docteur Blanche	The spirit	Sarah Lévy	TV movie
2015	Premiers crus	Monsieur du Mesnil	Jérôme Le Gris	
2015	La marcheuse	Mr. Kieffer	Naël Marandin	
2015	Gaz de France	Alain Rose-Marine	Benoit Forgeard	
2015	Marguerite & Julien	Lieutenant	Valérie Donzelli	
2016	L'ami	Pope Innocent III	Renaud Fely & Arnaud Louvet	
2016	À fond	Monsieur Château-Chantelle	Nicolas Benamou	
2016	La Loi de la jungle	De Rostiviec	Antonin Peretjatko	
2016	News from Planet Mars	The neighbor	Dominik Moll	
2016	The Girl Without Hands	The Devil	Sébastien Laudenbach	
2016	Origines	Jean Fauvel	Jérôme Navarro	TV series (1 episode)
2016	Candice Renoir	Luc Normand	Stéphane Malhuret	TV series (1 episode)
2016	Chefs	The Grand Master of the Circle	Arnaud Malherbe	TV series (2 episodes)
2017	Marie-Francine	Pierric Legay	Valérie Lemercier	
2017	Deux mains		Michaël Barocas	Short
2018	Un mensonge oublié	Georges Bricourt	Éric Duret	TV movie
2018	Scènes de ménages	Pierre	Francis Duquet	TV series (1 episode)
2018	Ad Vitam	Father Samuel	Thomas Cailley & Manuel Schapira	TV series (5 episodes)
2019	Ibiza	Philippe's father	Arnaud Lemort	
2020	De Gaulle	Philippe Pétain	Gabriel Le Bomin	

== Theatre ==
Year	Title	Author	Director	Notes
1963	L'École de dressage	Francis Beaumont & John Fletcher	Yves Gasc	
1969	David, la nuit tombe	Bernard Kops	Yves Gasc	
1970	The New Tenant	Eugène Ionesco	Pierre Peyrou	
1970	Je rêve (mais peut-être que non)	Luigi Pirandello	Pierre Peyrou	
1970	Process Karamazov	Diego Fabbri	Pierre Franck	
1971	Mon Faust	Paul Valéry	Pierre Franck	
1972	David, la nuit tombe	Bernard Kops	André Barsacq	
1973–74	Rubezahl, scènes de Don Juan	Oscar Milosz	Laurent Terzieff	
1976	Lucienne et le boucher	Marcel Aymé	Nicole Anouilh	
1977	Poor Murderer	Pavel Kohout	Michel Fagadau	
1979	La Baignoire	Victor Haïm	Georges Vitaly	
1979–80	The Hunchback	Sławomir Mrożek	Laurent Terzieff	
1981	Faut pas faire cela tout seul, David Mathel	Serge Ganzl	Georges Vitaly	
1982	Sherlock Holmes	William Gillette & Arthur Conan Doyle	Michel Fagadau	
1985	L'Indien sous Babylone	Jean-Claude Grumberg	Marcel Bluwal	
1986	Dirty Hands	Jean-Paul Sartre	Pierre-Étienne Heymann	
1990	The Best of Friends	Hugh Whitemore	James Roose-Evans	
1990	Right You Are (if you think so)	Luigi Pirandello	Maurice Attias	
1991	Richard II	William Shakespeare	Yves Gasc	
1993	Demain, une fenêtre sur rue	Jean-Claude Grumberg	Jean-Paul Roussillon	
1994	La Nuit du crime	Jean Serge, Robert Chazal & Robert Hossein	Robert Hossein	
1995	C.3.3.	Robert Badinter	Jorge Lavelli	
1996	La Délibération	Pierre Belfond	Jean-Claude Idée	
1997	Cap and Bells	Luigi Pirandello	Laurent Terzieff	Nominated - Molière Award for Best Supporting Actor
1998	Surtout ne coupez pas	Lucille Fletcher	Robert Hossein	
1999	Se trouver	Luigi Pirandello	Jean-Claude Amyl	
2000	The New Tenant	Eugène Ionesco	Pierre Peyrou	
2000	Les Femmes Savantes	Molière	Béatrice Agenin	
2001	Moi, Bertolt Brecht	Bertolt Brecht	Laurent Terzieff	
2001	Un homme à la mer	Ghigo de Chiara	Stéphan Meldegg	
2004	And Then There Were None	Agatha Christie	Bernard Murat	
2006	L'Escale	Paul Hengge	Stéphan Meldegg	
2006	Written on Water	Michel Marc Bouchard	Laurence Renn	
2009	The Dresser	Ronald Harwood	Laurent Terzieff	
2009	La Bruyère en toute liberté	Jean de La Bruyère	Francine Walter	
2012	Volpone	Ben Jonson	Nicolas Briançon	
