= The Queen of Hearts (2009 film) =

- Film poster
- Directed by: Valérie Donzelli
- Written by: Valérie Donzelli; Jérémie Elkaïm (collaboration); Dorothée Sebbag (collaboration)
- Starring: Valérie Donzelli; Béatrice de Staël; Jérémie Elkaïm
- Cinematography: Céline Bozon; Sébastien Buchmann; Claire Mathon
- Edited by: Pauline Gaillard
- Music by: Benjamin Biolay; Grand Popo Football Club; Lio
- Distributed by: Shellac
- Release dates: January 24, 2009 (Angers); February 24, 2010 (France)
- Running time: 84 minutes
- Country: France
- Language: French

The Queen of Hearts (French: La Reine des pommes) is a 2009 film directed by Valérie Donzelli. It was presented at the Locarno International Film Festival for the Filmmakers of the Present Competition.

== Cast ==
- Valérie Donzelli : Adèle
- Jérémie Elkaïm : Mathieu/Pierre/Paul/Jacques
- Béatrice de Staël : Rachel
- Laure Marsac : la Femme au téléphone
- Lucía Sánchez : la Voisine
- Vanessa Seward : Gladys
- Gilles Marchand : le Vigile
- Dominik Moll : le Jogger
- Benoit Carré : le Fou
- Serge Bozon : le Médecin
