= Hand in Hand (2012 film) =

2012 film by Valérie Donzelli

- Theatrical release poster
- French: Main dans la main
- Directed by: Valérie Donzelli
- Written by: Valérie Donzelli; Jérémie Elkaïm (collaboration); Gilles Marchand (collaboration)
- Produced by: Édouard Weil
- Starring: Valérie Lemercier; Jérémie Elkaïm
- Cinematography: Sébastien Buchmann
- Edited by: Pauline Gaillard
- Music by: Peter von Poehl
- Production companies: Rectangle Productions; Wild Bunch; France 3 Cinéma; Scope Pictures
- Distributed by: Wild Bunch
- Release dates: 10 November 2012 (Rome); 19 December 2012 (France)
- Running time: 80 minutes
- Country: France
- Language: French
- Budget: €3.9 million

Hand in Hand (French: Main dans la main) is a 2012 French romantic comedy-drama film written and directed by Valérie Donzelli. It stars Valérie Lemercier and Jérémie Elkaïm in the lead roles. It premiered on 10 November 2012 at the Rome International Film Festival. It was released in France on 19 December 2012.

== Plot ==
When Hélène and Joachim meet, they each have very different lives. Hélène lives in Paris and is the director of the prestigious dance school at the Palais Garnier, while Joachim is a working-class artisan glazier who lives with his sister in Commercy and participates in amateur dances competitions. The two meet when Joachim is sent to finish mounting a set of mirrors at the Paris Opera, and a strange force unites them.

== Cast ==
- Valérie Lemercier as Hélène Marchal
- Jérémie Elkaïm as Joachim Fox
- Béatrice de Staël as Constance de la Porte
- Valérie Donzelli as Véro
- Philippe Laudenbach as the Minister of Culture
- Serge Bozon as Jean-Pierre
- François Rollin as Commissaire Moulet
- Gilles Marchand as the fireman
- Katia Lewkowicz as Katia
- Lyn Thibault as Nelly, Hélène's assistant
- Sébastien Noiré as JF, Véro's husband
- Dominique Marcas as Mouna
- Antoine Chappey as the new Minister of Culture
- Albert Igual as Mr. Lesseur
- Bastien Bouillon as the apprentice glazier
- Benoit Carré as the crematorium worker
- Michaël Benard as Hélène's chauffeur
- Valentine Catzéflis as Constance's nurse
- Bertrand Bonello as one of Hélène's suitors
- Stéphane Manel as one of Hélène's suitors
- Bruno Lavaine as policeman
- Nicolas Charlet as policeman

== Production ==
Donzelli wrote the film's screenplay, in collaboration with Jérémie Elkaïm and Gilles Marchand. Édouard Weil produced the film through Rectangle Productions alongside Wild Bunch, France 3 Cinéma and Scope Pictures.

Principal photography began on 24 October 2011 in Commercy, a provincial town located in the Meuse department. The shoot, which lasted 51 days, also filmed in Paris and in New York City. The production filmed in the Ménagerie de Verre dance studio in the 11th arrondissement of Paris. Filming wrapped in mid-December 2011.

== Release ==
The film was selected to be screened in competition at the Rome International Film Festival, where it had its world premiere on 10 November 2012. Jérémie Elkaïm won the award for Best Actor at the festival.

Wild Bunch distributed the film in France on 19 December 2012.

== Reception ==
Hand in Hand received an average rating of 3.0 out of 5 stars on the French website AlloCiné, based on 25 reviews.
