= Julien and Marguerite de Ravalet =

1580s-1603 siblings executed for adultery and incest

Julien de Ravalet and Marguerite de Ravalet
- Born: 1582 (Julien); 1586 (Marguerite)
- Died: December 2, 1603
- Cause of death: Execution
- Known for: Siblings executed for committing incest
- Parents: Jean III de Ravalet (father); Madeleine de Hennot (mother)

Julien and Marguerite de Ravalet were the children of Jean III de Ravalet, lord of Tourlaville and Madeleine de Hennot, Madame of Tourlaville. They were executed on December 2, 1603, in Place de Grève in Paris for adultery and incest.

== Background ==
Julien de Ravalet was born in 1582 and Marguerite de Ravalet was born in 1586 in a family of eleven brothers and sisters. They grew up in Le Château des Ravalet, now more commonly known as Château de Tourlaville, located in Tourlaville.

== History ==
Since childhood, Julien and Marguerite were close friends and confidants, preferring to spend time with each other as much as possible rather than with anyone else. By the time they reached adolescence, this intimate friendship raised suspicions with their parents, who felt it was appropriate to separate the siblings. They sent Julien to the college of Coutances at age thirteen, but upon his return three years later, they continued to conspire to keep their children apart and began arranging a marriage for their daughter. On March 20, 1600, thirteen-year-old Marguerite was married to Jean Lefèvre de Haupitois, a nouveau rich nobleman who was thirty-two years-old, at the Notre-Dame de Tourlaville church. Although he lacked the noble rank of the de Ravelet family, Lefèvre built his wealth from the collector's charge of royal tax. Meanwhile, Julien was sent to Paris to pursue theological studies.

In August 1601, Marguerite gave birth to a daughter, Louise, but her and Lefèvre's marriage was an unhappy one. Lefèvre was prone to moments of unprovoked rage and jealousy, and he was physically abusive towards his wife. Marguerite was desperate to escape from her loveless marriage, but she received no sympathy from her parents, who encouraged her to stay with her husband. Ultimately, in early 1602, she fled back to Tourlaville, leaving her husband and daughter behind. Julien happened to be visiting Tourlaville at the same time. For a short time, the brother and sister were happy and unsuspected of their relationship. However, rumors began to spread among the chateau; their intimate jokes, silly games, and disappearing together for hours raised suspicions of an intimate relationship. A servant even caught the two sharing a bed at one point.

Lefèvre alerted the authorities of his wife's abandonment and sent a letter to the chateau, accusing the siblings of engaging in an incestuous relationship. They denied the charges and, on December 2, 1602, they ran away to Fougères, 120 miles away from their ancestral home, where they lived together for a few months. During this time, it is believed they began a romantic and sexual relationship, treating each other as husband and wife. Within weeks of arriving in Fougères, Marguerite became pregnant. Towards the end of August 1603, they heard Lefèvre may have discovered their whereabouts and they set out for Paris, arriving on September 7 and taking separate hotels. Two days later, Lefèvre filed a complaint at the Grand Châtelet, accusing Marguerite and Julien of adultery and incest. Commissioner Cassebras followed up on the accusations immediately, and the siblings were apprehended and arrested. Accompanied by a sergeant and guards, Lefèvre and the Commissioner surprised a clearly pregnant Marguerite in bed at her hotel, alone. The siblings were charged with adultery and incest, both punishable by death at the time.

== Trial ==
On September 19, 1603, the trial of Julien and Marguerite de Ravalet began at the Parlement of Paris. Marguerite, who was heavily pregnant and had been separated from her husband for over a year, was questioned on who the father of her child was. Marguerite denied the charges and alleged her pregnancy was the result of a rape by a traveling tailor, who attacked her during her stay in Tourlaville. She claimed she had gone to Paris to follow a religious vocation. Julien's defense against the charges was his claim of saving his sister from an unhappy marriage and that the incest accusation stemmed from a jealous husband who misinterpreted a hug between the two. Between September 20 and 25, Marguerite gave birth to a son named Julien II de Ravalet, who was swiftly removed from her care and placed with their older brother, Philippe, and ended up being raised by Julien and Marguerite's parents.

The evidence presented against the siblings was a series of letters exchanged between the two over a three-year period of 1600 through 1603, detailing intimate conversations that strongly hinted at a passionate and sexual relationship. Between November 24 and 27, the letters were read in a public hearing. Witnesses, varying from servants, acquaintances and Lèfevre all testified Marguerite wanted to stay with her brother at all times and the two appeared to be in love, and dates regarding the conception and birth of Marguerite's child corresponded with the time period in which she was traveling with Julien. On December 1, the court found them guilty on all charges and sentenced them to death.

Their father, Jean de Ravalet, petitioned King Henri IV at the Louvre for a pardon. Henri was sympathetic but Lefèvre was adamant that the sentence be carried out. Henri ultimately rejected Jean de Ravalet's pleas for clemency because, as a married woman, Marguerite's crime of adultery and her pregnancy were crimes against God. In his decision, the king was quoted by contemporary writer Pierre de L'Estoile to have said: "If the woman would not have been married, I would have gladly given her pardon, but as she is, I could not." Henri did make one concession: after the execution their father was given the corpses of his children. They would not be exhibited at the Montfaucon gallows as was customary.

On December 2, 1603, Julien and Marguerite arrived at the Place de Grève for execution. They were each given a chance to confess and Marguerite, in a desperate attempt to save her brother, confessed she was solely guilty and she had bewitched him. Julien refused to confess nor implicate his sister. As the execution was beginning, a crowd of people began to gather in support of the siblings and pleaded for them to be spared. Nevertheless, they were executed by decapitation. Marguerite's final words were "In your hands, Lord." Julien was 21 and Marguerite was 17.

The siblings were entombed in the church of Saint-Jean-en-Grève, in Paris, bearing the epitaph “Here lie the brother and sister. You who pass by, do not inquire as to the cause of their death, but go and pray to God for their souls.”

== Aftermath ==
After the execution, Marguerite's two children, Louise and Julien II, were later declared beneficiaries to the chateau of Tourlaville. However, in the few years that followed, Jean de Ravalet gave away large sums of his wealth in endowments to local churches for the benefit of the poor. In 1625, Jean de Ravalet made a large donation to a Benedictine convent in Cherbourg.

In 1653, Jean de Ravalet died and left the chateau to a nephew, but having given all his fortune to charity, the estate was penniless. The chateau was sold, and the remaining de Ravalet family members relocated to various areas across Europe.

The church the siblings were entombed in was demolished between 1797 and 1800.

== Legacy ==
The affair was popularized by Barbey d'Aurevilly when he appended an account of it to his 1874 book The She-Devils.

The tale of Julien and Marguerite de Ravelet is said to have inspired John Ford’s 17th century play 'Tis Pity She's a Whore.

A French film, Marguerite & Julien, was directed by Valerie Donzelli and released in 2015. It depicts a modern version of the story and retains historical elements.
