= At Work (film) =

2025 film by Valérie Donzelli

- French: À pied d'œuvre
- Directed by: Valérie Donzelli
- Written by: Valérie Donzelli; Gilles Marchand
- Based on: À pied d'œuvre by Franck Courtès
- Produced by: Alain Goldman
- Starring: Bastien Bouillon; Virginie Ledoyen; André Marcon; Marie Rivière
- Cinematography: Irina Lubtchansky
- Edited by: Pauline Gaillard
- Music by: Jean-Michel Bernard
- Production companies: Pitchipoï Productions; France 2 Cinéma
- Distributed by: Diaphana Films
- Release dates: 29 August 2025 (Venice); 4 February 2026 (France)
- Running time: 92 minutes
- Country: France
- Box office: $2 million

At Work (French: À pied d'œuvre) is a 2025 French drama film and directed by Valérie Donzelli, co-written with Gilles Marchand, based on the novel of the same name by Franck Courtès. It stars Bastien Bouillon as Paul Marquet, a photographer who abandons his successful career to pursue writing, but falls into poverty.

The film had its world premiere in the main competition of the 82nd Venice International Film Festival on 29 August 2025, where it won the Best Screenplay award. It was released theatrically in France by Diaphana Films on 4 February 2026.

== Plot ==
Paul Marquet, a highly successful photographer abandons everything to pursue writing, only to fall into poverty. Although his novels are well reviewed, sales remain low, as does his income. He survives through temporary jobs, and as an uber driver in his father's car.

Paul eventually signs up for an online platform that offers fierce competition among applicants, driving wages down, thus discovering the precarious world of platform economy workers. While writing his next novels by morning, he accepts all sorts of jobs during the afternoon and night, often physically demanding, each time with the constant anxiety of the rating his client will give him, which is publicly displayed on the app.

He meets a diverse range of people, which fuels his curiosity as a writer, but his family doesn't understand why he accepts this lifestyle. Separated from his children, who have moved to Montreal with their mother, his limited financial resources prevent him to visit them. His first successful novel addresses his own personal life and the precarious world of platform economy workers.

== Cast ==
- Bastien Bouillon as Paul Marquet
- Virginie Ledoyen as Alice
- André Marcon as Paul's father
- Marie Rivière as Christine
- Valérie Donzelli as Paul's ex-wife
- Adrien Barazzone as Pierre Lautrec
- Marion Lécrivain as Paul's sister
- Oscar Tillette as Paul's son
- Ève Oron as Paul's daughter

== Production ==
On 18 March 2024, it was announced that Valérie Donzelli was adapting the novel À pied d'œuvre by photographer Franck Courtès into a film. The film received an avance sur recettes grant from France's Centre national du cinéma et de l'image animée (CNC) in January 2025. Bastien Bouillon, Virginie Ledoyen, and Marie Rivière were announced as cast members on 11 February 2025.

Principal photography began on 17 February 2025. The film was shot over six weeks in and around Paris.

== Release ==
Kinology acquired the international sales rights to the film in July 2025. The film premiered in the main competition of the 82nd Venice International Film Festival. It was released by Diaphana Films in France on 4 February 2026. Teodora handled distribution in Italy.

== Reception ==
=== Box office ===
It grossed $2 million during its theatrical release in France and Italy.

=== Accolades ===
Award	Year	Category	Recipient(s)	Result	Ref.
Venice Film Festival	2025	Golden Lion	Valérie Donzelli	Nominated	
Venice Film Festival	2025	Best Screenplay	Valérie Donzelli and Gilles Marchand	Won	
