= 37th César Awards =

Annual film awards

- Official poster featuring a 1960 photo of the late French actress Annie Girardot
- Date: 24 February 2012
- Site: Théâtre du Châtelet, Paris, France
- Hosted by: Antoine de Caunes

Highlights
- Best Picture: The Artist
- Best Director: Michel Hazanavicius
- Best Actor: Omar Sy
- Best Actress: Bérénice Bejo
- Most awards: The Artist (6)
- Most nominations: Poliss (13)

Television coverage
- Network: Canal Plus

The 37th César Awards ceremony, presented by the French Academy of Cinema Arts and Techniques (Académie des Arts et Techniques du Cinéma), was held on 24 February 2012, at the Théâtre du Châtelet in Paris. The awards honoured the best films of 2011. The Artist won six out of its ten nominations, including Best Film, Best Director (Michel Hazanavicius), Best Actress (Bérénice Bejo), and Best Cinematography (Guillaume Schiffman). The ceremony was chaired by Guillaume Canet, with Antoine de Caunes as master of ceremonies. Nominations were announced 27 January 2012.

== Winners and nominees ==
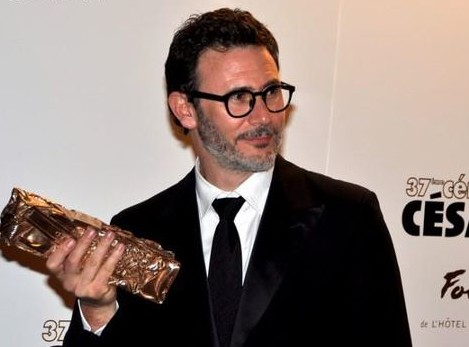
Michel Hazanavicius, César Award for Best Director.

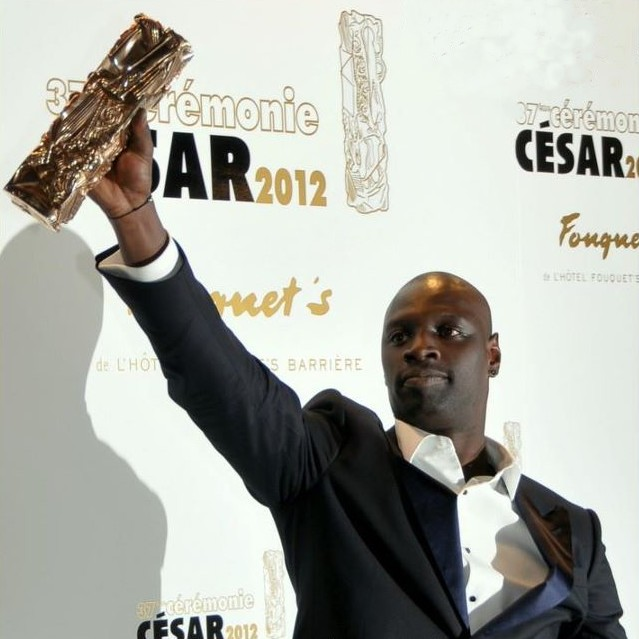
Omar Sy, César Award for Best Actor.

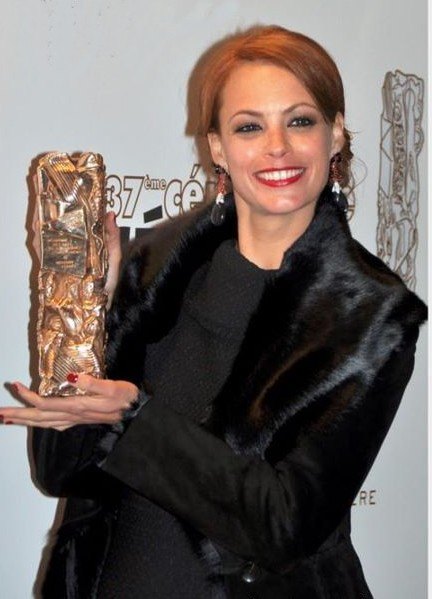
Bérénice Bejo, César Award for Best Actress.

Winners are listed first and highlighted in bold.

Best Film	Best Director
**The Artist**: Declaration of War (La Guerre est déclarée); Le Havre; The Intouchables (Intouchables); The Minister (L'Exercice de l'État); Pater; Polisse	**Michel Hazanavicius, The Artist**: Alain Cavalier, Pater; Valérie Donzelli, Declaration of War; Aki Kaurismäki, Le Havre; Maïwenn, Polisse; Pierre Schöller, The Minister; Éric Toledano and Olivier Nakache, The Intouchables
Best Actor	Best Actress
**Omar Sy, The Intouchables**: Sami Bouajila, Omar Killed Me (Omar m'a tuer); François Cluzet, The Intouchables; Jean Dujardin, The Artist; Olivier Gourmet, The Minister; Denis Podalydès, The Conquest (La Conquête); Philippe Torreton, Guilty (Présumé coupable)	**Bérénice Bejo, The Artist**: Ariane Ascaride, The Snows of Kilimanjaro (Les neiges du Kilimandjaro); Leïla Bekhti, The Source (La Source des femmes); Valérie Donzelli, Declaration of War; Marina Foïs, Polisse; Marie Gillain, All Our Desires (Toutes nos envies); Karin Viard, Polisse
Best Supporting Actor	Best Supporting Actress
**Michel Blanc, The Minister**: Nicolas Duvauchelle, Polisse; Joeystarr, Polisse; Bernard Le Coq, The Conquest; Frédéric Pierrot, Polisse	**Carmen Maura, The Women on the 6th Floor (Les Femmes du 6e étage)**: Isabelle Breitman, The Minister; Anne Le Ny, The Intouchables; Noémie Lvovsky, House of Tolerance (L'Apollonide: souvenirs de la maison close); Karole Rocher, Polisse
Most Promising Actor	Most Promising Actress
**Grégory Gadebois, Angel & Tony**: Guillaume Gouix, Jimmy Rivière; Nicolas Bridet, You Will Be My Son; Pierre Niney, 18 Years Old and Rising; Dimitri Storoge, A Gang Story	(**tie**) **Naidra Ayadi, Polisse** and **Clotilde Hesme, Angel & Tony**: Adèle Haenel, House of Tolerance (L'Apollonide: souvenirs de la maison close); Céline Sallette, House of Tolerance (L'Apollonide: souvenirs de la maison close); Christa Théret, Twiggy
Best First Feature Film	Best Original Screenplay
**When Pigs Have Wings**: My Little Princess; 17 Girls (17 filles); Angel & Tony (Angèle et Tony); Delicacy (La Délicatesse)	**The Minister (L'exercice de l'État), Pierre Schoeller**: The Artist, Michel Hazanavicius; Declaration of War (La Guerre est déclarée), Valérie Donzelli and Jérémie Elkaïm; The Intouchables (Intouchables), Éric Toledano and Olivier Nakache; Polisse, Maïwenn and Emmanuelle Bercot
Best Cinematography	Best Adaptation
**The Artist, Guillaume Schiffman**: Polisse, Pierre Aïm; House of Tolerance (L'Apollonide: Souvenirs de la maison close), Josée Deshaies; The Minister (L'Exercice de l'État), Julien Hirsch; The Intouchables (Intouchables), Mathieu Vadepied	**Carnage, Roman Polanski and Yasmina Reza**: Delicacy (La Délicatesse), David Foenkinos; Guilty (Présumé coupable), Vincent Garenq; Omar Killed Me (Omar m'a tuer), Olivier Gorce, Roschdy Zem, Rachid Bouchareb and Olivier Lorelle; Rebellion (L'Ordre et la Morale), Mathieu Kassovitz, Benoît Jaubert and Pierre Geller
Best Editing	Best Sound
**Polisse, Laure Gardette and Yann Dedet**: The Artist, Anne-Sophie Bion and Michel Hazanavicius; The Minister (L'Exercice de l'État), Laurence Briaud; Declaration of War (La guerre est déclarée), Pauline Gaillard; The Intouchables, Dorian Rigal-Ansous	**The Minister (L'Exercice de l'État), Olivier Hespel, Julie Brenta and Jean-Pierre Laforce**: The Intouchables, Pascal Armant, Jean Goudier, and Jean-Paul Hurier; House of Tolerance (L'Apollonide: Souvenirs de la maison close), Jean-Pierre Duret, Nicolas Moreau, and Jean-Pierre Laforce; Polisse, Nicolas Provost, Rym Debbarh-Mounir, and Emmanuel Croset; Declaration of War (La Guerre est déclarée), André Rigaut, Sébastien Savine, and Laurent Gabiot
Best Music Written for a Film	Best Costume Design
**The Artist, Ludovic Bource**: Beloved (Les Bien-Aimés), Alex Beaupain; House of Tolerance (L'Apollonide: Souvenirs de la maison close), Bertrand Bonello; A Monster in Paris (Un monstre à Paris), Matthieu Chedid and Patrice Renson; The Minister (L'Exercice de l'État), Philippe Schœller	**House of Tolerance (L'Apollonide: Souvenirs de la maison close), Anaïs Romand**: My Little Princess, Catherine Baba; The Artist, Mark Bridges; The Women on the 6th Floor (Les Femmes du 6e étage), Christian Gasc; The Source (La Source des femmes), Viorica Petrovici
Best Production Design	Best Documentary Film
**The Artist, Laurence Bennett**: House of Tolerance (L'Apollonide: Souvenirs de la maison close), Alain Guffroy; The Women on the 6th Floor (Les Femmes du 6e étage), Pierre-François Limbosch; The Minister (L'Exercice de l'État), Jean-Marc Tran Tan Ba; Le Havre, Wouter Zoon	**Tous au Larzac**: Le Bal des menteurs; Crazy Horse; Ici on noie les Algériens; Michel Petrucciani
Best Animated Film	Best Short Film
**The Rabbi's Cat (Le Chat du rabbin)**: The Circus (Le Cirque); A Monster in Paris (Un monstre à Paris); Mouse's Tale (La Queue de la souris); The Painting (Le Tableau)	**L'Accordeur**: La France qui se lêve tôt; J'aurais pu être une pute; Je pourrais être votre grand-mère; Un Monde sans femmes
Best Foreign Film	
**A Separation (Jodái-e Náder az Simin) (Iran), Asghar Farhadi**: Black Swan (United States), Darren Aronofsky; The King's Speech (United Kingdom), Tom Hooper; Drive (United States), Nicolas Winding Refn; The Kid with a Bike (Le Gamin au vélo) (Belgium), Jean-Pierre and Luc Dardenne; Incendies (Canada), Denis Villeneuve; Melancholia (Denmark), Lars von Trier

== Honorary César ==
Kate Winslet, English actress and singer

== Viewers ==
The show was followed by 3.9 million viewers. This corresponds to 18.2% of the audience.

== See also ==
- 84th Academy Awards
- 65th British Academy Film Awards
- 24th European Film Awards
- 17th Lumière Awards
- 2nd Magritte Awards
- 57th David di Donatello
- 27th Goya Awards
