= High Society (2014 film) =

- Film poster
- French: Le beau monde
- Directed by: Julie Lopes-Curval
- Written by: Sophie Hiet; Julie Lopes-Curval
- Produced by: Fabienne Vornier; Francis Boespflug; Stéphane Parthenay
- Starring: Ana Girardot; Bastien Bouillon; Baptiste Lecaplain
- Cinematography: Céline Bozon
- Edited by: Muriel Breton
- Music by: Sébastien Schuller
- Production company: Pyramide Productions
- Distributed by: Pyramide Distribution
- Release date: 13 August 2014 (France)
- Running time: 95 minutes
- Country: France
- Language: French
- Budget: $3.4 million
- Box office: $307.025

High Society (French: Le beau monde) is a 2014 French romantic drama film written and directed by Julie Lopes-Curval. The film stars Ana Girardot, Bastien Bouillon and Baptiste Lecaplain. It was selected to be screened in the Contemporary World Cinema section at the 2014 Toronto International Film Festival. In January 2015, the film received two nominations at the 20th Lumière Awards.

== Plot summary ==
Alice, a young girl with a talent for fashion, leaves Bayeux and her modest background to study embroidery at a Parisian school. This is an opportunity for her to discover the "beautiful world," customs and traditions different from those she has always known. Antoine, the son of a bourgeois family who falls in love with her, and Harold, a perfume designer, act as bridges between the two worlds.

== Cast ==
- Ana Girardot as Alice
- Bastien Bouillon as Antoine
- Baptiste Lecaplain as Kevin
- Aurélia Petit as Agnès
- Sergi López as Harold
- India Hair as Manon
- Stéphane Bissot as Christiane
- Jean-Noël Brouté as Monsieur Jacquard
- Michèle Gleizer as Arlette
- David Houri as Rodolphe
- Blanche Cluzet as Catherine
- Cécile Bernot as Déborah
- Lawrence Valin as Martin
