= The Untouchable (film) =

2006 film

- Directed by: Benoît Jacquot
- Written by: Benoît Jacquot
- Produced by: Christophe Bruncher
- Starring: Isild Le Besco; Marc Barbé
- Cinematography: Caroline Champetier
- Edited by: Luc Barnier
- Music by: Vijay Jaiswal; Monu Rao
- Release date: 2006
- Running time: 92 minutes
- Country: France
- Language: French

The Untouchable (French: L'Intouchable) is a 2006 French drama film written and directed by Benoît Jacquot.

The film entered the main competition at the 63rd edition of the Venice Film Festival, in which Isild Le Besco won the Marcello Mastroianni Award for Best Young Actor.

== Cast ==
- Isild Le Besco as Jeanne
- Marc Barbé as François
- Bérangère Bonvoisin as Jeanne's mother
- Manuel Munz as Jeanne's agent
- Valérie Donzelli as the stage actress
- Louis-Do de Lencquesaing as the director
- Jérémie Elkaïm as the assistant-director
- Caroline Champetier as the nun
- Pascal Bongard as the nun's cousin
- Pierre Chevalier as the friend

== Production ==
Filming took place in Paris, Delhi, Varanasi and Pont-à-Mousson (Meurthe-et-Moselle).
