= Requiem for Billy the Kid =

2006 film

- French: Requiem pour Billy the Kid
- Directed by: Anne Feinsilber
- Written by: Jean-Christophe Cavallin; Anne Feinsilber
- Produced by: Jean-Jacques Beineix; Carine Leblanc
- Cinematography: Patrick Ghiringhelli
- Edited by: Pauline Gaillard
- Music by: Claire Diterzi
- Production companies: Cargo Films; New Western Films
- Distributed by: MK2 Diffusion; Park Circus
- Release date: 20 May 2006
- Running time: 90 min
- Country: France

Requiem for Billy the Kid (French: Requiem pour Billy the Kid) is a 2006 French documentary biographical western film directed by Anne Feinsilber and starring Kris Kristofferson and Arthur H as Billy the Kid. It was released at the 2006 Cannes Film Festival.
