= Little Girl (film) =

French documentary film

- Poster
- French: Petite fille
- Directed by: Sébastien Lifshitz
- Screenplay by: Sébastien Lifshitz
- Produced by: Muriel Meynard
- Cinematography: Paul Guilhaume
- Edited by: Pauline Gaillard
- Music by: Yolande Decarsin
- Release date: February 2020 (Berlin)
- Running time: 85 minutes
- Country: France
- Language: French
- Box office: $28,876

Little Girl (French: Petite fille) is a 2020 French documentary film written and directed by Sébastien Lifshitz. The cinematography was by Paul Guilhaume, and the editing was by Pauline Gaillard. It focuses on the story of transgender seven-year-old Sasha, who was assigned male at birth but has known she is a girl since the age of four. She sees a psychiatrist with a special interest in gender who diagnoses her with gender dysphoria. The documentary follows the difficulty Sasha and her family face in helping her transition in provincial France.

== Screenings ==
Little Girl was screened at the Berlin International Film Festival in the Panorama Queer film section in 2020. It was shown at the Zurich Film Festival in 2020 and Chicago International Film Festival. In the UK, it was shown on BBC Four and BBC iPlayer under the Storyville documentary strand in 2021.

== Reception ==
Leslie Felperin of The Guardian gave the documentary 4 out of 5 stars, praising Guilhaume's "limpid" cinematography as "[allowing the viewer] to study every flicker of expression on the faces of Sasha and the adults around her".

Ben Dowell of The Times also gave the film 4 out of 5 stars.

== Awards ==
- Winner, European Film Award for Best Sound Designer at the European Film Awards
- The 2020 Grand Prix for Best Film at Film Fest Gent
- Silver Hugo for Best Documentary film at the 2020 Chicago International Film Festival
- The Prix du public at the Rencontres Internationales du Documentaire de Montréal (RIDM) in 2020
- Side by Side LGBT Film Festival, Saint Petersburg 2020 Best Documentary
