= Inquisitio =

- Genre: thriller; historical fiction
- Developed by: Nicolas Cuche; Lionel Pasquier
- Starring: Philippe Laudenbach
- Country of origin: France
- No. of seasons: 1
- No. of episodes: 8

Production
- Producer: Jean Nainchrik
- Running time: 52 minutes

Original release
- Release: July 4 – July 25, 2012

Inquisito is a French thriller television series set in the Middle Ages. It was created by Nicolas Cuche and Lionel Pasquier and produced by Septembre Productions. It first aired on television on France 2 on July 4, 2012 and continued until July 25, 2012.

== Season 1 ==
=== List of Episodes ===
1. De viris
2. Docendi & iudicandi
3. Murus strictus
4. Dura lex sed lex
5. Hic Jacet
6. Aura popularis
7. Consensus omnium
8. Acta est fabula

== Season 2 ==
France 2 has ordered a second season.

Episodes	Air date	Number of viewers
1 and 2	July 4, 2012	4.28 million
3 and 4	July 11, 2012	2.9 million
5 and 6	July 18, 2012	2.4 million
7 and 8	July 25, 2012	2.4 million

== Bibliography ==
- Inquisitio, Nicolas Cuche, Robert Lafon, 2012 ISBN 2749917166
