= Marguerite & Julien =

2015 film

- Theatrical release poster
- Directed by: Valérie Donzelli
- Written by: Valérie Donzelli; Jérémie Elkaïm; Gilles Marchand (collaboration)
- Produced by: Edouard Weil; Alice Girard
- Starring: Anaïs Demoustier; Jérémie Elkaïm
- Cinematography: Céline Bozon
- Edited by: Pauline Gaillard
- Music by: Yuksek
- Distributed by: Wild Bunch
- Release dates: 19 May 2015 (Cannes); 2 December 2015 (France)
- Running time: 110 minutes
- Country: France
- Language: French
- Budget: $7.4 million
- Box office: $123.918

Marguerite & Julien (French: Marguerite et Julien) is a 2015 French drama film directed by Valérie Donzelli about a brother and sister involved in an incestuous relationship. The film is based on a 1970s screenplay written by Jean Gruault for François Truffaut, which in turn is based on the true story of aristocratic siblings Marguerite and Julien de Ravalet who were executed in the 17th century on charges of incest and adultery. It was selected to compete for the Palme d'Or at the 2015 Cannes Film Festival.

== Plot ==
A group of children at an orphanage talk about rumors of Julien and Marguerite de Ravalet, siblings who are on the run for committing incest, and one of the caretakers tells the story about the siblings.

As children, Julien and Marguerite shared a close relationship and were deeply devoted to each other. After Julien saves Marguerite from a horse riding incident, their uncle, Abbot, feels uneasiness in the siblings’ relationship. He advises their father, Jean, to send Julien and his older brother, Phillipe, to study abroad on the excuse Marguerite is distracting their education.

Six years pass, during which Marguerite refuses to marry and spends her time alone. When Julien and Phillipe return, Marguerite shares a joyous reunion with Julien. Their parents arrange for her to be betrothed to Marigny, who is crippled but kind to Marguerite. However, Marguerite is uninterested and Julien exhibits jealousy towards Marigny.

During dinner with Marigny, Julien excuses himself with Marguerite following him. It is the first time Julien and Marguerite are alone with each other and the attraction is too much to overcome. They try and fight it since they are not willing to admit that they are in love. Instead, they play an increasingly sexual game that includes trying to make the other shudder and squirm.

After being gone for a while, their parents find them partially undressed and punish them for causing Marigny to cancel the engagement. Marguerite later meets with Julien in secret and confesses her love to him but, although he reciprocates, he rejects her. She tries to kiss him but he quickly leaves.

Shortly after, Marguerite is married to Lefevbre, a wealthy tax collector. When he tries to initiate sex with Marguerite, she locks him out of her bedroom. The marriage quickly becomes extremely unhappy and Lefevbre begins physically abusing Marguerite. She tries to seek help from her parents but they demand she stay with her husband. Julien later finds out what is happening and frees Marguerite by beating Lefebvre and allowing her to return home. That same night, Julien and Marguerite have sex for the first time.

A maid catches Julien in bed with Marguerite, and tells their parents. Their father contemplates sending Julien away but their mother, wanting to make her children happy, arranges for them to secretly run away together. Lefevbre files charges against Julien and Marguerite for incest and adultery, and they are declared fugitives.

After traveling for several weeks, they arrive in Barfleur, and Marguerite discovers she is pregnant. Marguerite disguises herself as a man to hide her identity but the authorities receive a tip on their whereabouts. Before they can board a ship to England, they are arrested.

At trial, both deny the charges and claim they ran away because Julien helped Marguerite escape from her abusive husband. Their father petitions King Henri IV to spare his children but the king says he cannot tolerate incest and refuses to pardon them. Meanwhile, Marguerite gives birth to a son, who is placed in the care of a nunnery.

At the trial's conclusion, Julien and Marguerite are found guilty and sentenced to death. Marguerite pleads for her brother to be released and screams she is the only one guilty but no one listens to her.

The next day, Julien and Marguerite arrive at Place de Grève for their execution. Julien is executed first and Marguerite dies from the shock before she too is decapitated. After the execution, the Château is abandoned.

Julien and Marguerite's father and brother arrange to have the baby snuck out of the nunnery. The nun that brings them the baby reveals Marguerite named the baby Julien prior to her death. The de Ravalet family leaves, taking the baby with them.

== Cast ==
- Anaïs Demoustier as Marguerite de Ravalet
- Jérémie Elkaïm as Julien de Ravalet
- Frédéric Pierrot as Jean de Ravalet
- Aurélia Petit as Madame de Ravalet
- Raoul Fernandez as Lefevbre
- Catherine Mouchet as Jacqueline
- Geraldine Chaplin as Lefebvre's mother
- Bastien Bouillon as Philippe
- Sami Frey as the Abbot of Hambye
- Maxime Dambrin as Marigny
- Alice de Lencquesaing as Nicole
- Philippe Laudenbach as Lieutenant
- Esther Garrel as The storyteller

== Reception ==
The film received generally negative reviews from critics. Review aggregation website Rotten Tomatoes reported an approval rating of 29%, based on 7 reviews, with an average score of 3.5/10. At Metacritic, which assigns a normalized rating out of 100 to reviews from mainstream critics, the film received an average score of 35, based on 11 reviews, indicating "generally unfavorable reviews".

Boyd van Hoeij of The Hollywood Reporter called it "ambitiously mounted but wildly uneven".

== See also ==
- Julien and Marguerite de Ravalet
