= Declaration of War (film) =

- Film poster
- Directed by: Valérie Donzelli
- Written by: Jérémie Elkaïm; Valérie Donzelli
- Produced by: Edouard Weil
- Starring: Valérie Donzelli
- Cinematography: Sébastien Buchmann
- Edited by: Pauline Gaillard
- Distributed by: Wild Bunch Distribution
- Release date: 12 May 2011 (Cannes)
- Running time: 100 minutes
- Country: France
- Language: French
- Budget: $1.6 million
- Box office: $7.7 million

Declaration of War (French: La Guerre est déclarée) is a 2011 French film directed by Valérie Donzelli, and written by and starring Donzelli and Jérémie Elkaïm; it is based on actual events in their lives together, when they were a young couple caring for their dangerously ill son. It was released on the 31 August 2011 and received very positive reviews; Allociné, a review aggregation website gave it an average of 4.3 stars out of five. Le Monde gave it a full five stars, saying "Against cancer, an undoubtable force of happiness". The film was selected as the French entry for the Best Foreign Language Film at the 84th Academy Awards, but it did not make the final shortlist.

== Cast ==
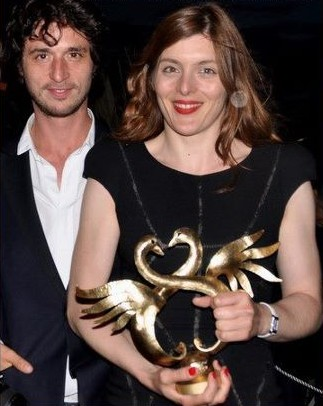
Valérie Donzelli and Jérémie Elkaïm

- Valérie Donzelli as Juliette
- Jérémie Elkaïm as Roméo Benaïm
- César Desseix as Adam (18 months old)
- Gabriel Elkaïm as Adam (8 years old)
- Brigitte Sy as Claudia, Roméo's mother
- Elina Löwensohn as Alex, Claudia's wife
- Michèle Moretti as Geneviève, Juliette's mother
- Philippe Laudenbach as Philippe, Juliette's father
- Bastien Bouillon as Nikos
- Béatrice De Staël as Doctor Prat, pediatrician
- Anne Le Ny as Doctor Fitoussi, neurologist
- Frédéric Pierrot as Doctor Sainte-Rose, surgeon
- Blanche Gardin as The Hostess Necker
- Jennifer Decker as A girl at the feast of Jeanne

== Reception ==
=== Critical response ===
Declaration of War has an approval rating of 86% on review aggregator website Rotten Tomatoes, based on 43 reviews, and an average rating of 7.4/10. Metacritic assigned the film a weighted average score of 73 out of 100, based on 21 critics, indicating "generally favourable reviews".

=== Awards and nominations ===
Year	Association	Category	Recipient(s)	Result
2011	Gijón International Film Festival	Grand Prix Asturias for Best Film	Declaration of War	Won
2011	Gijón International Film Festival	Best Actor	Jérémie Elkaïm	Won
2011	Gijón International Film Festival	Best Actress	Valérie Donzelli	Won
2011	Paris Cinema	Jury Award for Best Feature Film	Declaration of War (Valérie Donzelli)	Won
2011	Paris Cinema	Audience Award	Valérie Donzelli	Won
2011	Paris Cinema	Bloggers' Award	Valérie Donzelli	Won
2012	César Awards 2012	Best Film	Declaration of War	Nominated
2012	César Awards 2012	Best Director	Valérie Donzelli	Nominated
2012	César Awards 2012	Best Actress	Valérie Donzelli	Nominated
2012	César Awards 2012	Best Original Screenplay	Jérémie Elkaïm, Valérie Donzelli	Nominated
2012	César Awards 2012	Best Editing	Pauline Gaillard	Nominated
2012	César Awards 2012	Best Sound	André Rigaut, Laurent Gabiot, Sébastien Savine	Nominated
2012	Étoiles d'Or	Best Screenplay (Scénario)	Jérémie Elkaïm, Valérie Donzelli	Won
2012	Hong Kong International Film Festival	SIGNIS Award	Valérie Donzelli	Nominated
2012	Hong Kong International Film Festival	SIGNIS Award - Special Mention	Valérie Donzelli	Won
2012	17th Lumière Awards	Best Actress	Valérie Donzelli	Nominated

== See also ==
- List of submissions to the 84th Academy Awards for Best Foreign Language Film
- List of French submissions for the Academy Award for Best Foreign Language Film
