= The Very Merry Widows =

- Film poster
- Directed by: Catherine Corsini
- Written by: Catherine Corsini; Philippe Blasband; Christophe Morand
- Produced by: Philippe Martin; Jacques-Henri Bronckart
- Starring: Jane Birkin; Émilie Dequenne; Pierre Richard
- Cinematography: Jeanne Lapoirie
- Edited by: Yannick Kergoat
- Music by: Krishna Levy
- Production company: Les Films Pelléas
- Distributed by: Mars Distribution
- Release dates: 9 July 2003 (France); 20 August 2003 (Belgium)
- Running time: 89 minutes
- Countries: France; Belgium
- Language: French
- Budget: €3.9 million
- Box office: $345,478

The Very Merry Widows (French: Mariées mais pas trop) is a 2003 Franco-Belgian black comedy film directed and co-written by Catherine Corsini.

== Plot ==
Renée (Jane Birkin) is a wealthy widow several times over. When her orphaned granddaughter Laurence (Émilie Dequenne) turns up looking for a place to stay, she gives the naïve young woman some instruction on marriage to the rich and terminal as a means of self-enrichment. After trying a couple of local men, Laurence sets her sights on the insurance agent investigating her grandmother's latest loss, Thomas (Jérémie Elkaïm). Renée herself, on the other hand, finds herself falling in love: with Maurice (Pierre Richard).

== Cast ==
- Jane Birkin as Renée
- Émilie Dequenne as Laurence
- Pierre Richard as Maurice
- Clovis Cornillac as Alexis
- Jérémie Elkaïm as Thomas
- Laurent Grévill as Jean-Daniel
- Amira Casar as Claudia
- Pierre Laroche as Georges

== Reception ==
A reviewer in Variety called the film "jauntily amoral" while noting that other critics had judged it "lame and distasteful".
