= Olivier Mellano =

French composer and guitarist (born 1971)

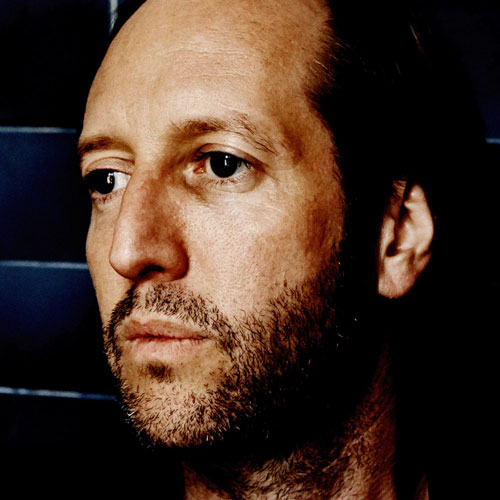

Background information
- Born: Olivier Mellano; 21 July 1971 (age 54)
- Genres: Pop rock, New music
- Occupations: Musician, composer, writer
- Instruments: Guitar, singing
- Years active: 1987–present
- Label: Idwet Naïve Classique
- Website: www.oliviermellano.com/en/

Olivier Mellano (born 21 July 1971) is a French musician, composer, improvisator, writer and a guitarist who has played in more than fifty groups since the beginning of the nineties. He alternatively works on pop-rock projects and on compositions including symphonic orchestra, 17 electric guitars, harpsichord, organ, voice or string quartet.

== Life and career ==
Over the past two decades, Olivier Mellano has collaborated with more than fifty pop, rap, and rock groups, including Psykick Lyrikah, Mobiil, Bed, Laetitia Shériff, and Dominique A. His work has recently extended into cinematic, theatrical, dance and literary contexts. In 2006, his landscape began to include new music, and his recording "La Chair des Anges" was released on the Naïve Classique label.

Mellano performs "cine-concerts" at venues around the world and serves as coordinator for collective project such as "L'Ile Electrique", "Superfolia Armaada", and "Ralbum". He also improvises as a soloist or in duets with artists including Boris Charmatz, Robin Guthrie, Bertrand Chamayou, André Markowicz, Claro, François Jeanneau, and John Greaves.

In 2012, on commission from the Brittany Symphony Orchestra, he composed the triptych "How we tried a new combination of notes...", which premiered at the Rennes Opera with the Brittany Symphony under of the direction of Jean-Michaël Lavoie, featuring soprano Valérie Gabail, the Pink Iced Club (twelve electric guitars), MC Dälek, Simon Huw Jones, and Black Sifichi. He is currently working on his second book, has composed and performed music for the Handke/ Nordey play "Par les Villages", and has returned to the world of sonic rock with his solo album "MellaNoisEscape".

== Discography ==
=== Solo Albums ===
- La chair des anges (2007)
- Mellano: How we tried a new combination of notes to show the invisible or even the embrace of eternity (2012)
- MellaNoisEscape (2014)
- La jeune fille sans mains (The Girl Without Hands) [Original Motion Picture Soundtrack] (2016)
- Heartbeat of the Death (MellaNoisEscape) (2018)
- Simple Women (Original Motion Picture Soundtrack) (2020)
- L'Oiseau de Paradis (Original Motion Picture Soundtrack) (2020)
- Pollock & Pollock (Original Motion Picture Soundtrack) (2022)
- Cores - Music for Adrien M & Claire B (2023)

=== Collaborative Albums ===
- Echox (Guitar Duets Series) (2015, with Noël Akchoté)
- Phobies (2016, with Marc Sens)
- One (2021, with Régïs Boulard & NO&RD)
- Alive (2022, with Mona Soyoc)
- After Us (2024, with Melaine Dalibert)
- TWOO (2025, with NO&RD & Regis Boulard)

=== Singles ===
- No Land (2017, with Branden Perry & Bagad' Cesson)
- Overwhelming Joy (2018)
- Hearts (2022, with Moya Soyoc)
- Avatar (2022, with Moya Soyoc)

== Filmography ==
- Le jour de gloire... (2007) - Composer
- Reulf (2009) - Composer
- À contre-temps (2009) - Composer
- Vasco (2010) - Composer
- Love Like Poison (2010) - Composer
- Quelques ecchymoses (2012) - Composer
- How We Tried a New Combination of Light (2012) - Composer
- XI. la force (2013) - Composer
- Everyday Objects (2013) - Composer
- On the Road... (2015) - Composer
- The Existence According to Gabriel (2015) - Composer
- Miss Impossible (2016) - Composer
- The Girl Without Hands (2016) - Composer
- The Blind and the Cardinal (2017) - Composer
- Vibrato (2017) - Composer
- Histoire de Stefano (2018) - Composer
- Simple Women (2019) - Composer
- Paradise (2020) - Composer
- Pollock & Pollock (2021) - Composer
- Yugo (2021) - Composer
- Cloche petite, aux merveilles du pays (2022) - Composer
- Nuits blanches (2023) - Composer
- Dans la chambre (Upcoming, 2025) - Composer

== Decorations ==
- Knight of the Order of Arts and Letters (2017)
