= Christophe Bruncher =

French film producer

- Born: France
- Occupation: Film producer
- Years active: 2005–present

Christophe Bruncher (born March 24) is a French film producer.

== Filmography ==
- 2021: Women Do Cry, Mina Mileva & Vesela Kazakova - (producer)
- 2019: Cat In The Wall, Mina Mileva & Vesela Kazakova - (co-producer)
- 2016: Paris Prestige, Hamé Bourokba & Ekoué Labitey from La Rumeur - (co-producer)
- 2016: Mr. Stein Goes Online, Stéphane Robelin - (producer)
- 2011: And If We All Lived Together, Stéphane Robelin - (producer)
- 2007: Charly, Isild Le Besco - (producer)
- 2006: The Untouchable, Benoît Jacquot, (executive producer, producer)

== Awards ==
- 2006: Mostra de Venise, L'intouchable
