= The Girl Without Hands (film) =

- Film poster
- French: La Jeune Fille sans mains
- Directed by: Sébastien Laudenbach
- Screenplay by: Sébastien Laudenbach
- Based on: The Girl Without Hands by Brothers Grimm
- Produced by: Jean-Christophe Soulageon
- Starring: Anaïs Demoustier; Jérémie Elkaïm
- Edited by: Santi Minasi; Sébastien Laudenbach
- Music by: Olivier Mellano
- Production companies: Les Films Sauvages; Les Films Pelléas
- Distributed by: Shellac
- Release dates: 12 May 2016 (Cannes); 14 December 2016 (France)
- Running time: 76 minutes
- Country: France
- Language: French

The Girl Without Hands (French: La Jeune Fille sans mains) is a 2016 French animated drama film directed, written, edited, and animated by Sébastien Laudenbach in his feature debut; Laudenbach animated the entire film on his own. The film is based on the Brothers Grimm fairy tale of the same name and stars the voices of Anaïs Demoustier and Jérémie Elkaïm. It premiered in the ACID section at the 2016 Cannes Film Festival and played in competition at the 2016 Annecy International Animated Film Festival, where it received the Jury Distinction award.

== Plot ==
The Devil appears to a miller and offers to make him rich if he sells him "what is behind your mill". The miller returns home to find liquid gold flowing through his mill, but discovers that his daughter had been behind the mill, playing in an apple tree. After years of luxury, the Devil reappears to collect the young girl, but finds her too clean to take. He orders the family to confine the young girl to the apple tree, guarded by dogs which then maul her mother to death when she tries to help her. When the Devil returns, he finds that the young girl had kept her hands clean. He angrily orders the miller to cut off her hands, and the young girl consents. Even then, the young girl makes her arm stumps clean with just her teardrops, and the Devil still cannot collect her. The young girl angrily chooses to leave the mill.

After wandering the forest, the young girl finds pears growing in a garden. She tries to reach them, but is unable to cross a strong-flowing river to get to them. The goddess of the river rescues her and takes her to the garden, telling her that a prince owns the garden. The prince and his gardener servant welcome the young girl to their castle. Eventually, the prince and the young girl fall in love, with the prince giving her two prosthetic hands made of gold as a wedding gift.

The prince has to leave to lead his army to war, leaving the now pregnant young girl in the gardener's care. She gives birth to a healthy son, though she finds her golden hands useless in handling the baby. The gardener sends the joyful news to the prince, but the Devil replaces the message with a note saying she had given birth to a monster, instead. The prince sends a reply saying that he still stands by the young girl and their son, but the Devil changes that message, as well, to a note ordering the execution of the young girl and her son. Appalled, the gardener lets the young girl and her son escape, instead, handing her a bag of magic seeds. The young girl follows the river to its source, where the goddess tells her of an abandoned house where they can live. The young girl and her son prosper in the house, living off the food grown from the seeds. She abandons her useless golden hands in the river.

The prince finally returns after losing the war. The gardener initially pretends to have carried out the executions, but then tells the truth when the prince tells him that he never wrote that message. The prince then sets out on a quest to find the young girl and their son. After many years, he finds the mill, finding that her father ultimately hanged himself, and finding the remains of the young girl's hands. He also finds the golden hands in the river, and follows the river to the house. Still thinking he wants to kill them, the young girl attacks the prince with an ax, only to realize that she now has new hands to hold the ax. The prince explains that the note was fake, but just then, the Devil in a raven form attacks their son. He then morphs into a pig form he had used all through the film. The young girl uses the ax to kill the pig, and the Devil finally gives up on trying to take her. The prince and the young girl decide to stay neither in the house nor the castle, but for the family to find new adventure.

== Voice cast ==
- Anaïs Demoustier as the Young Girl
- Jérémie Elkaïm as the Prince
- Philippe Laudenbach as the Devil
- Olivier Broche as the Father
- Françoise Lebrun as the Mother
- Sacha Bourdo as the Gardener
- Elina Löwensohn as the Goddess

== Production ==
In 2001, the producer Les Films Pelléas offered Sébastien Laudenbach the adaptation of Olivier Py's play La Jeune Fille, le diable et le moulin.

The development of this first project spanned seven years, with various collaborators: Nathalie Hertzberg on the screenplay, Émilie Mercier on the storyboard, Muriel Patarroni and Gabrielle Cariolle on graphic research.

In 2008, the project was abandoned due to lack of sufficient funding, with the film estimated at 4.4 million euros.

In 2012, Chiara Malta, Sébastien Laudenbach's partner, became a resident at Villa Médicis for cinema. She stayed there from March 2013 to March 2014. It was during this stay that Sébastien Laudenbach decided to resume the project. However, lacking the rights to Py's play, a producer, or a team, he embarked on the making of La Jeune Fille sans mains alone. He utilized almost none of what had been developed during the first project, nor the screenplay, visual research, or storyboard. He improvised the film from the first frame to the last, painting on paper based on the framework of the Grimm tale. The animation was sketched out; Laudenbach did not conduct line tests and therefore did not know the outcome of what he was drawing.

It was during this stay in Rome that Jean-Christophe Soulageon, with whom Laudenbach was working on Daphné ou la belle plante (co-directed with Sylvain Derosne), offered to produce La Jeune Fille sans mains.

Sébastien Laudenbach stated in the press: ''Sometimes I felt like I was my heroine, given how modest my means were.''

=== Original music ===
The original music for the film was composed by Olivier Mellano, who had previously collaborated with the director on two short films. They agreed on the main themes of the soundtrack during a screening where they worked together; Mellano mentioned ''a very instinctive, very light, and quite raw way of working together'', facilitated by the trust established between the two men over the course of their joint work. The two main themes of the film's music are that of the girl without hands, linked to a whistled song that recurs several times, and that of the prince. More generally, the music, like the tale, is divided between lighter aspects and others that are much darker. The song Wild Girl, heard at the end of the film, is composed and written by the director, then rearranged by the composer; it is sung by Laetitia Sheriff.

== Reception ==
The critical reception of the film was generally very positive, as can be seen on the Allociné website.

Cécile Mury's review on the Télérama website is enthusiastic, with the film receiving the Ulysse 1 award. Elisabeth Franck-Dumas describes it as a ''visual and sound aesthetic shock'' and a ''enchantment'' in Libération. Stéphane Dreyfus in La Croix highlights ''a stunning beauty''.

In the free daily 20 Minutes, Caroline Vié offers a favorable review of the film, which she believes is ''a sensory experience and a filmed poem'' and appreciates the female protagonist who does not let herself be defeated.

=== Awards and nominations ===
- At the 2016 Annecy International Animation Film Festival, the film received the jury prize.
- 2016 Pau International Film Festival: Young Jury Prize
- BIAF - Bucheon International Animation Film Festival: Grand Prize
- Anim'Est - Bucharest Animation Film Festival: Grand Prize
- TAAF - Tokyo Anime Award Festival: Grand Prize
- BIFF - Brasilia International Film Festival: Audience Award
- César 2017: nominated for Best Animated Film (Feature-Length)
