= Bastien Bouillon =

French actor

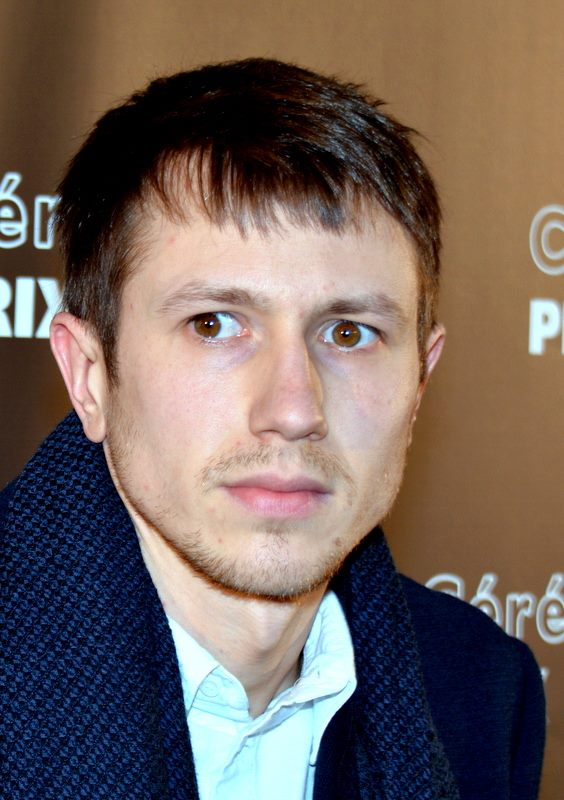
- Bouillon in 2015
- Born: 19 May 1985 (age 41); Châteauroux, France
- Occupation: Actor
- Years active: 2009–present
- Children: 3

Bastien Bouillon is a French actor. Most known for High Society (2014), The Count of Monte Cristo (2024) and Leave One Day (2025).

In 2023, he received the César Award for Best Male Revelation for his performance in the thriller film The Night of the 12th (2022). For Leave One Day he received his first César Award for Best Actor nomination.

== Personal life ==
He is the son of the stage director Gilles Bouillon, founder of the Centre Dramatique Régional de Tours. Through his great uncle Jo Bouillon who was her fourth husband, Bastien Bouillon is the great-nephew of Josephine Baker by marriage.

He is the father of three boys.

=== Political views ===
In June 2024, Boulion signed a petition addressed to French President Emmanuel Macron demanding France to officially recognize the State of Palestine.

== Filmography ==
=== Feature films ===
Year	English Title	Original Title	Role	Notes
2011	Declaration of War	La Guerre est déclarée	Nikos	
2011	War of the Buttons		Tintin	
2012	The Players	Les Infidèles	Valentin	Segment: "Lolita"
2012	Hand in Hand	Main dans la main	L'apprenti-miroitier	
2013	2 Autumns, 3 Winters	2 automnes 3 hivers	Benjamin	
2014	High Society	Le beau monde	Antoine	Révélations des César; Nominated—Lumière Award for Best Male Revelation
2015	Indésirables		Sergueï	
2015	Marguerite & Julien	Marguerite et Julien	Philippe	
2015	Parisienne	Peur de rien	Arnaud	
2019	The Mystery of Henri Pick	Le Mystère Henri Pick	Fred Koskas	
2020	Jumbo		Marc	
2022	The Night of the 12th	La Nuit du 12	Yohan Vivès	César Award for Best Male Revelation
2022	Astrakan		Clément	
2022	Umami		Jean	
2024	The Count of Monte Cristo	Le Comte de Monte-Cristo	Fernand de Morcerf	
2024	Monsieur Aznavour		Pierre Roche	
2025	The Incredible Snow Woman	L’ Incroyable femme des neiges	Lolo	
2025	Leave One Day	Partir un jour	Raphaël	
2025	Connemara		Christophe	
2025	At Work	À pied d'œuvre	Paul Marquet	
2026	The Birthday Party	Histoires de la Nuit	Thomas	

=== Short films ===
Year	Title	Role
2009	Les Destructions	
2010	The Line That Divides	Thomas
2011	Encore heureux	Martin
2012	Jeudi 19	
2012	Rose, maintenant	
2013	Le Locataire	David
2013	Pour la France	Charles
2013	My Sense of Modesty	Clément
2013	Pour faire la guerre	David
2014	Sur la touche	Arthur

=== Television ===
Year	Title	Role	Notes
2009	Medical Emergency	Jeune 1	TV series
2009	R.I.S, police scientifique	Romain Dutreuil	TV series
2009	Le Temps est à l'orage	Romain	Telefilm
2009	Night Squad	Nico	TV series
2009	Boulevard du Palais	Elliot Dantziger	TV series
2010	Insanity	Fred	Telefilm
2010	Au siècle de Maupassant: Contes et nouvelles du XIXème siècle	Antoine	TV series
2011	Simple	Simple	Telefilm
2012	The Judge Is a Woman	Valentin Fauvel	TV series
2012	Profilage	Sulian Frégé jeune	TV series
2013	Détectives	Adrien Morel	TV series
2015	Deux	Antoine	Telefilm
2017	Transferts	Gaëtan Syrmay/Alexandre Syrmay	TV series
2022	Le Horla	Damien	Telefilm

== Theatre ==
Year	Title	Director	Notes
2010	Des jours et des nuits à Chartres	Daniel Benoin	Théâtre National de Nice
2012	Kids	Gilles Bouillon	Centre Dramatique Régional de Tours
2013	Dans la solitude des champs de coton	Gilles Bouillon	Centre Dramatique Régional de Tours
