= Love Like Poison =

2010 film by Katell Quillévéré

- Film poster
- French: Un poison violent
- Directed by: Katell Quillévéré
- Written by: Mariette Désert; Katell Quillévéré
- Produced by: Justin Taurand
- Starring: Clara Augarde; Lio; Michel Galabru
- Cinematography: Tom Harari
- Edited by: Thomas Marchand
- Music by: Olivier Mellano
- Production companies: Les Films du Bélier; Arte France Cinéma
- Distributed by: Sophie Dulac Distribution
- Release dates: 14 May 2010 (Cannes); 4 August 2010 (France)
- Running time: 92 minutes
- Country: France
- Language: French
- Budget: $2.5 million
- Box office: $690.000

Love Like Poison (French: Un poison violent, lit. 'A violent poison') is a 2010 French coming-of-age drama film directed by Katell Quillévéré and starring Clara Augarde, Lio and Michel Galabru. The film's title is taken from the song "Un poison violent, c'est ça l'amour" by Serge Gainsbourg. It was screened in the Directors' Fortnight section of the 2010 Cannes Film Festival. It won the Prix Jean Vigo in 2010.

== Plot ==
The 14-year-old Anna is vacationing with her mother in Brittany at her grandfather's ancestral house. The grandfather is confined to his bedroom since he is old. Her mother meanwhile is having crisis with her married life and is on the verge of moving back with her parents. Anna and her mother are religious. Anna is upset by the separation of her parents and gets close with male figures. A local teenage boy is attracted with her and she reciprocates the attention. Despite her shame of her body she finds confidence in exploring her sexuality. She begins to show fainting spells at gatherings. She is anxious about her confirmation and confides it with the priest, who is her mother past lover. She is torn between her unsympathetic world in front of her and faith, but she finds happiness by embracing her teenage emotions and asks out the local boy with whom she has spent time.

== Cast ==
- Clara Augarde as Anna Falguères
- Lio as Jeanne Falguères
- Michel Galabru as Jean Falguères
- Stefano Cassetti as Father François
- Thierry Neuvic as Paul Falguères
- Youen Leboulanger-Gourvil as Pierre
- Philippe Duclos as The Bishop

== Production ==
Clara Augarde, who was 14 year old during filming, agreed to have topless scenes, but she refused to play the one where her character lifts her nightgown to show her genitals (An older body double replaced her).

== Reception ==
As of June 2020, the film holds a 93% approval rating on the review aggregator website Rotten Tomatoes, based on 14 reviews with an average rating 7.89/10.
