= The Ultimate Accessory =

2013 French comedy film

- Film poster
- French: 100% cachemire
- Directed by: Valérie Lemercier
- Written by: Valérie Lemercier
- Produced by: Genevieve Lemal; Edouard Weil
- Starring: Valérie Lemercier; Gilles Lellouche; Marina Foïs
- Cinematography: Denis Lenoir
- Edited by: Célia Lafitedupont
- Production company: Rectangle Productions
- Distributed by: Wild Bunch
- Release date: 11 December 2013
- Running time: 98 minutes
- Country: France
- Language: French
- Budget: $16.8 million
- Box office: $3.9 million

The Ultimate Accessory (French: 100% cachemire) is a 2013 French comedy film directed by Valérie Lemercier.

== Cast ==
- Valérie Lemercier as Aleksandra Cohen-Le Foulon
- Gilles Lellouche as Cyrille Cohen
- Marina Foïs as Sophie
- Brigitte Roüan as Martine
- Chantal Ladesou as Danielle
- Gérard Darmon as The doctor
- Bruno Podalydès as Pierre Dutertre
- Brigitte Roüan as Martine
- Anne Benoît as The DDASS lady
- Pierre Vernier
- Olivier Broche

== Reception ==
Judith Prescott from Frenchcinemareview.com objected in her review "clichès" and judged altogether the film would not "do justice" to Valérie Lemercier's "talent".
