= Pauline Gaillard =

French film editor

Pauline Gaillard is a French film editor. She is most noted for her work on the films Declaration of War (La Guerre est déclarée), for which she was a César Award nominee for Best Editing at the 37th César Awards in 2012; Babysitter, for which she was a Prix Iris nominee for Best Editing at the 25th Quebec Cinema Awards in 2023; and The Nature of Love (Simple comme Sylvain), for which she was a Canadian Screen Award nominee for Best Editing at the 12th Canadian Screen Awards in 2024.

== Filmography ==
- Le Passage des bêtes - 2001
- The Days When I Do Not Exist (Les jours où je n'existe pas) - 2002
- Comme si de rien n'était - 2003
- Sleep Tight (Les Lionceaux) - 2003
- La Peau trouée - 2005
- Requiem for Billy the Kid - 2006
- Tycoon's Interpreter (La Traductrice) - 2006
- Another Man (Un autre homme) - 2008
- The Queen of Hearts (La Reine des pommes) - 2009
- Memory Lane - 2010
- Ivory Tower - 2010
- Declaration of War (La Guerre est déclarée) - 2011
- Les Invisibles - 2012
- Hand in Hand (Main dans la main) - 2012
- Longwave (Les Grandes Ondes (à l'ouest)) - 2013
- In Harmony (En équilibre) - 2015
- Marguerite & Julien - 2015
- France (Les Habitants) - 2016
- The Lives of Thérèse (Les Vies de Thérèse) - 2016
- Braguino - 2017
- Little Girl (Petite Fille (film) - 2020
- Babysitter - 2022
- Continental Drift (South) (La dérive des continents (au sud)) - 2022
- Just the Two of Us (L'Amour et les forêts) - 2023
- The Nature of Love (Simple comme Sylvain) - 2023
- 2025: The Safe House, in competition at the 75th Berlin International Film Festival
- 2026: Burgundy
