= Longwave (film) =

- Directed by: Lionel Baier
- Written by: Lionel Baier; Julien Bouissoux
- Produced by: Pauline Gygax; Max Karli
- Starring: Valérie Donzelli; Michel Vuillermoz; Patrick Lapp; Francisco Belard
- Cinematography: Patrick Lindenmaier
- Edited by: Pauline Gaillard
- Release date: 2013
- Running time: 85 minutes
- Countries: Switzerland; France; Portugal
- Languages: French; Portuguese

Longwave (French: Les Grandes Ondes (à l'ouest), Portuguese: As Ondas de Abril) is a 2013 Swiss-French-Portuguese comedy-drama film directed by Lionel Baier. The film's principal cast are Valérie Donzelli, Michel Vuillermoz, Patrick Lapp, and Francisco Belard.

== Plot ==
The film is set in 1974, based on a true story about a Swiss production team working for Radio Suisse Romande, who are assigned to produce a puff piece in Portugal but instead witness the Carnation Revolution.

== Release ==
The film débuted at the 2013 Locarno Film Festival. The US premiere of Longwave was at the Palm Springs International Film Festival on January 10, 2014. The distributor in France is Happiness Distribution, and in Switzerland is Pathé; the film has also been sold to Zeta Films for distribution in Argentina, Uruguay, Chile, and Paraguay.

== Reception ==
The reviewer for Variety found that the director had demonstrated "his thoroughgoing knowledge of and delight in film history, yet his striving for a 1970s screwball vibe feels too forced and artificial". In Público's Ípsilon, Luís Miguel Oliveira gave the film two out of five stars.

The film was nominated for the Swiss Film Award in three categories: Best Fiction Film, Best Screenplay (Lionel Baier and Julien Bouissoux), and Best Actor (Patrick Lapp) but did not win, losing to I Am the Keeper in each category.
