= Valérie Lemercier =

French actress (born 1964)

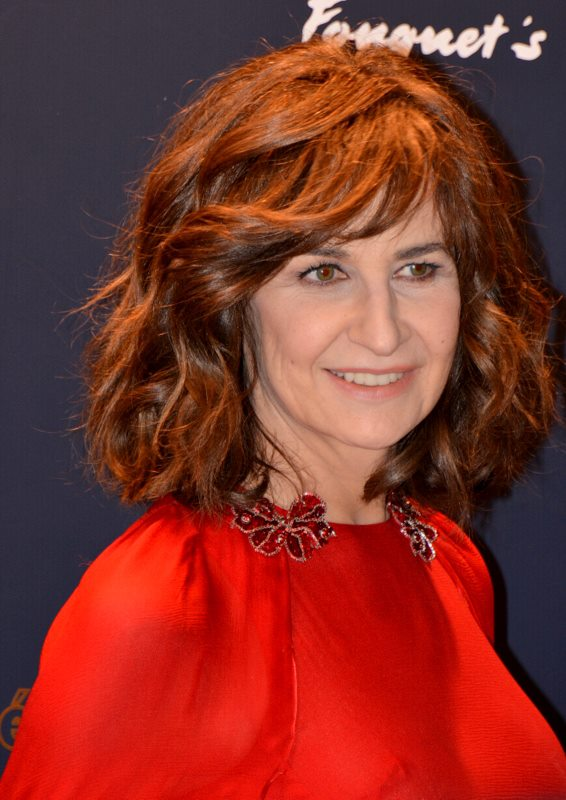
- Lemercier in 2017
- Born: 9 March 1964 (age 62); Dieppe, France
- Occupations: Actress, film director, screenwriter, singer
- Years active: 1988–present

Valérie Lemercier (French pronunciation: [valeʁi ləmɛʁsje]; born 9 March 1964) is a French actress, screenwriter, director and singer. She won the César Award for Best Actress for Aline in 2022 and the César Award for Best Actress in a Supporting Role twice, for Les Visiteurs in 1994 and Avenue Montaigne in 2007.

== Life and career ==
Born in Dieppe, Seine-Maritime as the daughter of farmers, Lemercier grew up in Gonzeville and then studied at the Rouen Conservatoire, a dance, music and drama school. Lemercier made her screen debut in 1988, in the television series Palace. Lemercier has won two César Awards for her supporting roles in Les Visiteurs (1994) and Avenue Montaigne (2007), and hosted the award ceremony in 2006 and 2007. She has subsequently become a successful director.

Lemercier released her first music album, Valérie Lemercier chante, in 1996, and has subsequently recorded three singles with other singers.

== Private life ==
She was in relationship for seven years with the lawyer Hervé Témime until his death in 2023.

== Filmography ==
=== As actress ===
Year	Title	Role	Director	Notes
1989	Palace	Lady Palace / a client		TV series, 1 episode
1990	May Fools	Mme Boutelleau	Louis Malle	
1990	Après après-demain	Loriane	Gérard Frot-Coutaz	
1991	L'Opération Corned-Beef	Marie-Laurence Granianski	Jean-Marie Poiré	Nominated—César Award for Best Supporting Actress
1992	Le Bal des casse-pieds	Mme Béteille	Yves Robert	
1992	Sexes faibles !	Maud Le Chesnay	Serge Meynard	
1993	Les Visiteurs	Frénégonde de Pouille, Béatrice de Montmirail	Jean-Marie Poiré	César Award for Best Supporting Actress
1993	Homeward Bound: The Incredible Journey	Sassy (voice)	Duwayne Dunham	French dub
1994	La Cité de la peur	The widow of the first projectionist	Alain Berbérian	
1994	Casque bleu	Laurette	Gérard Jugnot	
1995	Sabrina	Martine	Sydney Pollack	
1997	Quadrille	Paulette Nanteuil	Valérie Lemercier	Also as director
1999	Le Derrière	Frédérique Sénèque	Valérie Lemercier	Also as director and writer
1999	Tarzan	Jane Porter (voice)	Kevin Lima & Chris Buck	French dub
2000	Chicken Run	Ginger (voice)	Nick Park	French dub, home video release
2002	Vendredi soir	Laure	Claire Denis	
2003	Samedi soir en direct	Various roles		TV series
2004	RRRrrrr!!!	Pierre the Guitar-Sewing teacher	Alain Chabat	
2004	Narco	Herself	Tristan Aurouet and Gilles Lellouche	
2005	Palais royal!	Princesse Armelle	Valérie Lemercier	Also as director and writer Nominated—César Award for Best Actress
2005	The Magic Roundabout	Ermintrude (voice)	Jean Duval	
2006	Avenue Montaigne	Catherine Versen	Danièle Thompson	César Award for Best Supporting Actress
2006	Le Héros de la famille	Pamela	Thierry Klifa	
2007	L'Invité	Colette	Laurent Bouhnik	
2008	Musée haut, musée bas	Valérie	Jean-Michel Ribes	
2008	Agathe Cléry	Agathe Cléry	Etienne Chatiliez	
2009	Neuilly sa mère!	Barbara	Gabriel Julien-Laferrière	
2009	Le Petit Nicolas	Nicolas's Mother	Laurent Tirard	
2011	Beur sur la ville	The stadium announcer	Djamel Bensalah	
2011	Bienvenue à bord	Isabelle	Éric Lavaine	
2011	Monte Carlo	Madame Valerie	Thomas Bezucha	
2012	L'amour dure trois ans	Francesca Vernesi	Frédéric Beigbeder	
2012	Granny's Funeral	Alix	Bruno Podalydès	
2012	Asterix and Obelix: God Save Britannia	Miss Macintosh	Laurent Tirard	
2012	Hand in Hand	Hélène Marchal	Valérie Donzelli	
2013	100% cachemire	Aleksandra	Valérie Lemercier	Also as director and writer
2014	Nicholas on Holiday	Nicolas's Mother	Laurent Tirard	
2017	Marie-Francine	Marie-Francine Doublet	Valérie Lemercier	Also as director and writer
2018	Neuilly sa mère, sa mère !	Barbara	Gabriel Julien-Laferrière	
2021	Aline	Aline Dieu	Valérie Lemercier	Also as director and writer César Award for Best Actress; Nominated—César Award for Best Director; Nominated—César Award for Best Film; Nominated—César Award for Best Original Screenplay
2023	Coup de chance	Camille	Woody Allen	
2023	L'arche de Noé	Noelle		
2025	It Takes Two to Tango	Victoire	Jean-Pierre Améris	

=== As director/writer ===
Year	Title	Notes
1997	Quadrille	
1999	Le derrière	
2005	Palais royal!	
2013	The Ultimate Accessory	
2017	Marie-Francine	
2021	Aline	

== Theatre ==
- Valérie Lemercier au Splendid, Théâtre du Palais-Royal (1989)
- Un fil à la patte, Théâtre du Palais-Royal (1989)
- Valérie Lemercier au Théâtre de Paris (1995–1996)
- Folies Bergère (2000)
- Valérie Lemercier au Le Palace (Paris) (2008)

== Discography ==
- Valérie Lemercier chante (1996)
- Comme beaucoup de messieurs - duet with The Divine Comedy (band) (1996)
- J'ai un mari - duet with Pascale Borel (2006)
- Pourquoi tu t'en vas? - duet with Christophe Willem (2007)
- Peter and the Wolf (Narrator) (2007)
- Le Coup de soleil - duet with Vincent Delerm (2007)

== See also ==
- List of female film and television directors
- List of LGBT-related films directed by women
