= Valérie Donzelli =

French actress and filmmaker

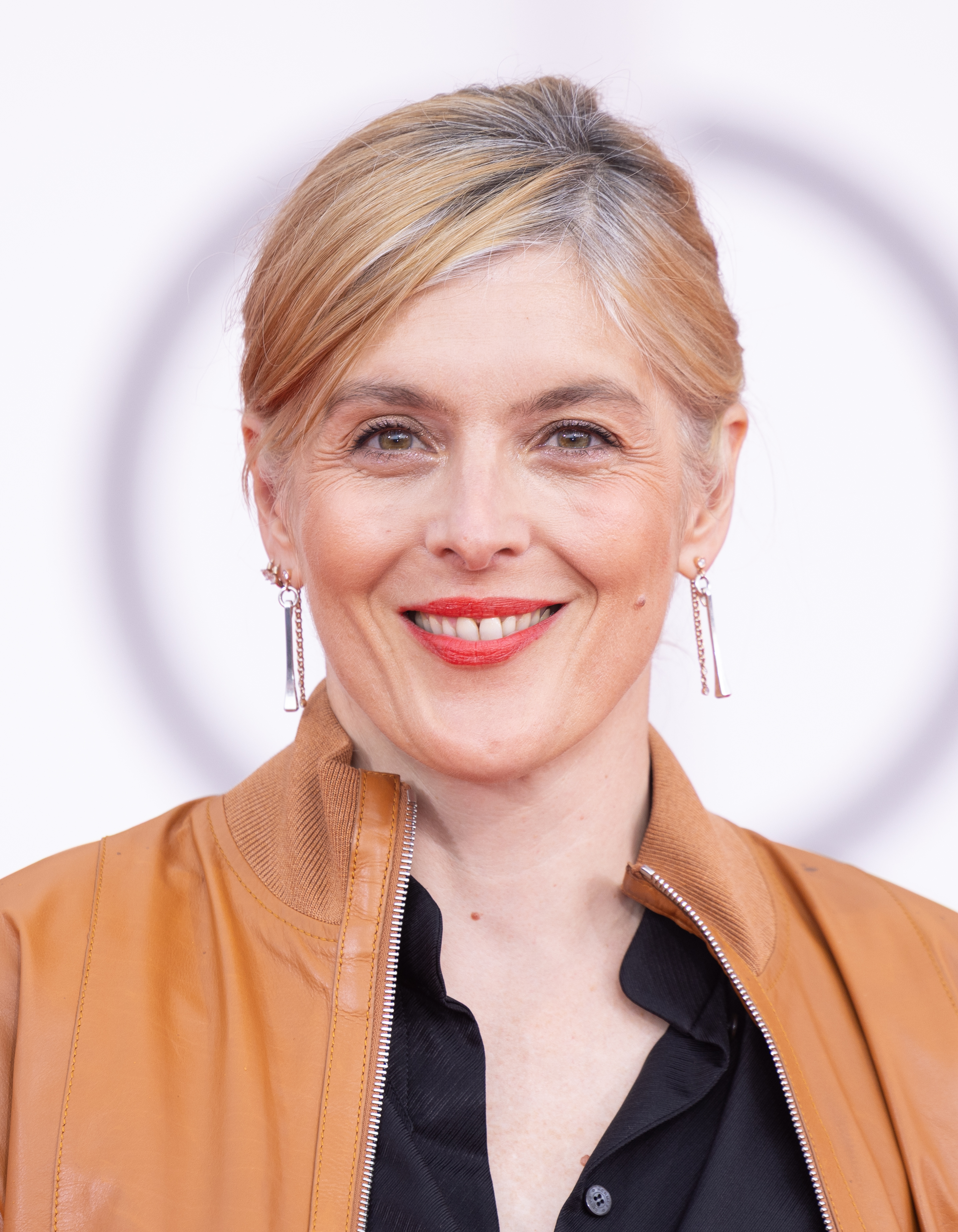
- Donzelli in 2025
- Born: 2 March 1973 (age 53); Épinal, Vosges, France
- Occupations: Film director; actress; screenwriter
- Years active: 1998–present
- Children: 2

Valérie Donzelli (born 2 March 1973) is a French actress and filmmaker. She has directed six feature films and two short films since 2008, including Declaration of War (2011), Just the Two of Us (2023) and At Work (2025).

== Early life ==
Valérie Donzelli was born in Épinal (France). She grew up in Créteil, near Paris. She moved to Lille with her family when she was 14 years old before going back to Paris at the age of 19. Before starting to work in the cinema, Donzelli first studied architecture, but abandoned it quickly. She started playing theatre at the municipal conservatory of the 10th arrondissement of Paris, but always kept a bad memory of this period. For a living, she worked at a bakery in Paris. She met Jérémie Elkaïm at that time, who became her partner, both in life and at work, and who encouraged her to quit the conservatory and her job at the bakery to become an actress. They now have two kids; the oldest one, Gabriel, inspired the movie Declaration of War. They are now separated, but still have a close relationship.

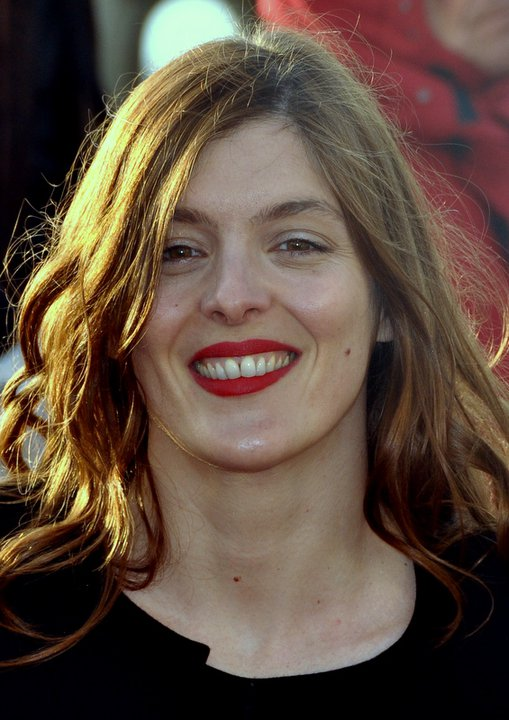
Donzelli in 2011

== Career ==
In 2001, Valérie Donzelli was the leading actress in Martha Martha, by Sandrine Veysset, which was presented at Directors' Fortnight, Le Plus Beau Jour de ma vie, and also Entre ses mains. She achieved great success among French public thanks to the French TV show Clara Sheller (2005), in which she plays Jeanne, best friend of the main character. Donzelli's first film, The Queen of Hearts (La Reine des Pommes), in which she was the leading actress, was more successful than expected. Jérémie Elkaïm is also co-writer. The film was presented at Locarno International Film Festival. Despite its low budget, the film can be considered a success because of its 30,000 spectators.

In 2011, with the help of her now ex-partner Jérémie Elkaïm, Valérie Donzelli directed her second full-length feature film, Declaration of War. This movie, presented during the 2011 Cannes Festival, achieved great success, both with the public and critics, in France. It is directly inspired by their private life, relating how their couple fought against their son's cancer when he was 18 months. As Tim Palmer notes, "Declaration of War serves as an emblematic, even quintessential, contemporary French production: a barometer to gauge film industry standards and prevailing French cultural taste, a standard-bearer of ostensibly progressive materials, an ambassador text for French screen values." The movie was selected for the Academy Award for Best Foreign Language Film in 2012, but was not part of the final list.

Donzelli directed once again Jérémie Elkaïm in Hand in Hand (2012), with also Valérie Lemercier in the leading role.

Donzelli considers that this is always a politic and engaged gesture to make films as women, and admires Agnès Varda for her work and her status of first women filmmaker into French Cinema.

Valérie Donzelli is part of the jury during Locarno International Film Festival in 2013. She presents Que d'Amour!, a TV adaptation from the play The Game of Love and Chance (Le Jeu de l'Amour et du Hasard), by Marivaux, with Comédie-Française' sociétaires.

Her 2015 film Marguerite & Julien was selected to compete for the Palme d'Or at the 2015 Cannes Film Festival. She was named as the president of the jury of the Critics' Week section of the 2016 Cannes Film Festival.

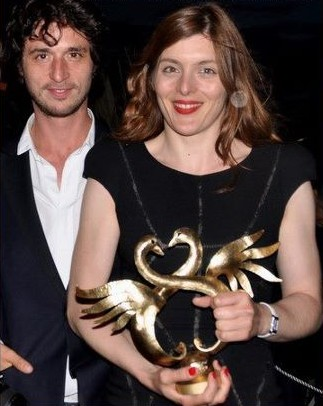
Donzelli and Jérémie Elkaïm at the Cabourg Film Festival 2011

== Filmography ==
=== As filmmaker ===
==== Feature films ====
Year	English Title	Original title	Notes
2009	The Queen of Hearts	La Reine des pommes	Co-written with Jérémie Elkaïm and Dorothée Sebbag
2011	Declaration of War	La Guerre est déclarée	Co-written with Jérémie Elkaïm
2012	Hand in Hand	Main dans la main	Co-written with Gilles Marchand and Jérémie Elkaïm
2015	Marguerite & Julien	Marguerite et Julien	Co-written with Gilles Marchand and Jérémie Elkaïm
2019	Notre Dame		
2023	Just the Two of Us	L'Amour et les Forêts	Co-written with Audrey Diwan
2025	At Work	À pied d'œuvre	Co-written with Gilles Marchand

==== Short films ====
Year	Title	Director	Screenwriter	Notes
2000	Demoiselle	Yes	Yes	
2007	Il fait beau dans la plus belle ville du monde	Yes	Yes	
2010	Madeleine et le facteur	Yes	Yes	
2012	La Vie parisienne	No	Yes	Original idea
2018	Le cinéma de maman	Yes	Yes	

==== Television ====
Year	Title	Director	Screenwriter	Notes
2013	Que d'amour!	Yes	Yes	TV movie Adaptation from The Game of Love and Chance, by Marivaux
2021	Nona et ses filles	Yes	Yes	9 episodes

=== Acting credits ===
==== Features ====
Year	Title	Role	Director
2001	Martha Martha	Martha	Sandrine Veysset
2001	Les Âmes câlines	Émilie	Thomas Bardinet
2003	Who Killed Bambi?	Nathalie	Gilles Marchand
2003	That Woman	Claire Atken	Guillaume Nicloux
2005	Le Plus Beau Jour de ma vie	Éléonore	Julie Lipinski
2005	Mystification ou l'histoire des portraits	Emilie	Sandrine Rinaldi
2005	Voici venu le temps	Soniéra Noubi-Datch	Alain Guiraudie
2005	Entre ses mains	Valérie	Anne Fontaine
2006	The Untouchable	theatre actress	Benoît Jacquot
2006	L'Homme qui rêvait d'un enfant	Suzanne	Delphine Gleize
2007	7 ans	Maïté	Jean-Pascal Hattu
2009	The Queen of Hearts	Adèle	Valérie Donzelli
2010	Ivory Tower	Baker	Adam Traynor
2011	Declaration of War	Juliette	Herself
2011	Belleville Tokyo	Marie Tourelle	Élise Girard
2011	Iris in Bloom	Monika	Valérie Mréjen and Bertrand Schefer
2011	Pourquoi tu pleures?	Anna	Katia Lewkowicz
2011	L'Art de séduire	Estelle	Guy Mazarguil
2012	Hand in Hand	Véro	Herself
2013	Opium	Valentine Hugo	Arielle Dombasle
2013	The Big Bad Wolf	Nathalie Delcroix	Nicolas Charlet and Bruno Lavaine
2013	Les Grandes Ondes (à l'ouest)	Julie	Lionel Baier
2014	Saint Laurent	Renée	Bertrand Bonello
2015	The White Knights	Françoise Dubois	Joachim Lafosse
2015	Orage	Louise	Fabrice Camoin
2019	Mais vous êtes fous	Maître Mangin	Audrey Diwan
2019	Notre dame	Maud Crayon	Herself
2020	Trop d'amour	La réalisatrice dans le rêve	Frankie Wallach
2021	On est fait pour s'entendre	Léna	Pascal Elbé
2021	Madeleine Collins	Madeleine Reynal	Antoine Barraud
2022	Azuro	Sara	Matthieu Rozé
2023	Making of	Alice	Cédric Kahn
2024	Ma vie ma gueule	La soeur de Barbie	Sophie Fillières
2025	Les musiciens	Astrid Carlson	Grégory Magne
2025	Rapaces	Solveig Rocher	Peter Dourountzis
2025	At Work	Paul's ex-wife	Herself

==== Short films ====
Year	Title	Role	Director
1998	Herbert C. Berliner		Marc Gibaja
1999	Le Spectateur	Cynthia	Marc Gibaja
2000	Demoiselle	Adèle	Valérie Donzelli
2001	Confessions dans un bain	Sophie	Marc Gibaja
2001	Le Chien, le chat et le cibachrome	La candidate peintre	Didier Blasco
2003	Ni vue, ni connue	Alice	Dorothée Sebbagh
2003	Le Lion volatil	La cliente en pleurs	Agnès Varda
2004	Frédérique amoureuse	Frédérique	Pierre Lacan
2004	Le Nécrophile	La prostituée	Philippe Barassat
2005	On est mort un million de fois	Valentine	Dorothée Sebbagh
2006	Odile...	Odile	Bénédicte Delgéhier
2007	Abattoir	Judith	Didier Blasco
2007	Il fait beau dans la plus belle ville du monde	Adèle	Valérie Donzelli
2008	C'est pour quand?	La jeune fille	Katia Lewkowicz
2009	Juliette	Juliette	Sylvie Ballyot
2010	Madeleine et le facteur	Madeleine	Herself
2010	Manu	Julie	Jérémie Elkaïm
2012	Révolution	Nadia Jandeau	
2017	Quand la ville dort	La prof (voice)	Simon Helloco

==== Television ====
Year	Title	Role	Director	Notes
1999	Dossier: disparus épisode Amanda	Amanda/Muriel	Frédéric Demont et Philippe Lefebvre	
1999	Les Terres froides	Isabelle	Sébastien Lifshitz	
2002	Sous mes yeux	Alison	Virginie Wagon	
2003	Motus	La stagiaire d'Antoine	Laurence Ferreira Barbosa	
2005	Le Cocon, débuts à l'hôpital	Nathalie	Pascale Dallet	
2005	Clara Sheller	Jeanne	Renaud Bertrand	
2006	Mentir un peu	Blandine	Agnès Obadia	
2006	Passés troubles	Sophie Valatier	Serge Meynard	
2007	Les Camarades	Julie	François Luciani	Miniseries
2008	Sa raison d'être	Nathalie	Renaud Bertrand	
2008	Mafiosa, le clan Saison 2	L'avocate	Eric Rochant	
2009	La Belle vie by Virginie Wagon	Béa		
2018	Nox	Emma Delage	Mabrouk El Mechri	
2021	Nona et ses filles	George	Herself	9 episodes

== Accolades ==
- 2010: Public Prize at the Angers European First Film Festival for The Queen of Hearts
- 2011: Valois d’Or at Festival du film francophone d’Angoulême for Declaration of War
- 2012: Grand Prix at Cabourg Film Festival for Declaration of War
- 2012: Jury Prize, Public Prize, and Bloggers Prix at the Festival Paris Cinéma for Declaration of War
- 2012: Étoile d'or du meilleur scénario for Declaration of War
- Nomination for Best film for Declaration of War, Cesar Awards 2012
- Nomination for Best Director for Declaration of War, Cesar Awards 2012
- Nomination for Best Actress for Declaration of War, Cesar Awards 2012
- Nomination for Best Original Screenplay for Declaration of War, Cesar Awards 2012
