= Gilles Marchand =

French film director

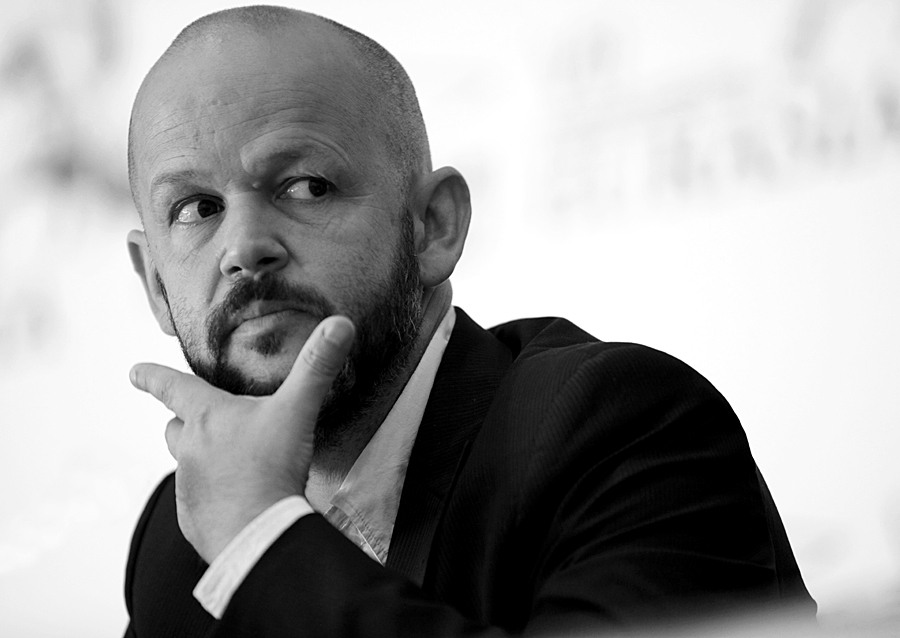
- Born: 18 June 1963 (age 62); Marseille, France
- Occupations: Film director Screenwriter
- Years active: 1987—present

Gilles Marchand (born 18 June 1963) is a French film director and screenwriter. He has directed five films since 1987. His film Qui a tué Bambi? was screened out of competition at the 2003 Cannes Film Festival.

== Filmography ==
Year	Title	Credited as			Notes
Year	Title	Director	Screenwriter	Other	Notes
1985	Nuit blanche	Yes	Yes		Short film
1986	Choisissez-moi	Yes	Yes		Short film
1987	L'Étendu	Yes	Yes		Short film
1987	Les Dieux du sport, les démons du sommeil			Yes	Short film; as cinematographer
1987	Le Gynécologue et sa secrétaire			Yes	Short film; as assistant director
1991	Caroline et ses amies			Yes	Short film; as cinematographer
1993	Joyeux Noël	Yes	Yes		Short film Clermont-Ferrand International Short Film Festival - Grand Prix; Kraków Film Festival - FIPRESCI Prize
1994	Intimité			Yes	As first assistant director
1995	Rome désolée			Yes	As cinematographer
1995	Jeux de plage			Yes	Short film; as assistant director
1997	Les Sanguinaires		Yes	Yes	Collaboration; also assistant director and actor
1998	C'est plus fort que moi	Yes	Yes		Short film
1999	Leçons de ténèbres			Yes	As cinematographer
1999	Human Resources		Yes		Thessaloniki International Film Festival - Best Screenplay; Nominated—César Award for Best Original Screenplay or Adaptation
2000	Harry, He's Here to Help		Yes		Nominated—César Award for Best Original Screenplay or Adaptation; Nominated—European Film Award for Best Screenwriter
2001	The Milk of Human Kindness		Yes		
2001	Les Âmes câlines		Yes		
2003	Bon Voyage		Yes		Collaboration
2003	Who Killed Bambi?	Yes	Yes		Nominated—César Award for Best First Feature Film
2004	Red Lights		Yes		
2005	Lemming		Yes		
2005	L'Avion		Yes		
2006	L'Éclaireur		Yes		
2009	The Queen of Hearts			Yes	As actor
2010	Black Heaven	Yes	Yes		
2010	Manù		Yes		Short film
2012	Hand in Hand		Yes	Yes	Collaboration; also actor
2015	Marguerite & Julien		Yes		Collaboration
2015	The Lady in the Car with Glasses and a Gun		Yes		
2016	News from Planet Mars		Yes		
2016	Into the Forest	Yes	Yes		
2025	Enzo		Yes		
