= Jérémie Elkaïm =

French actor, screenwriter and film director (born 1978)

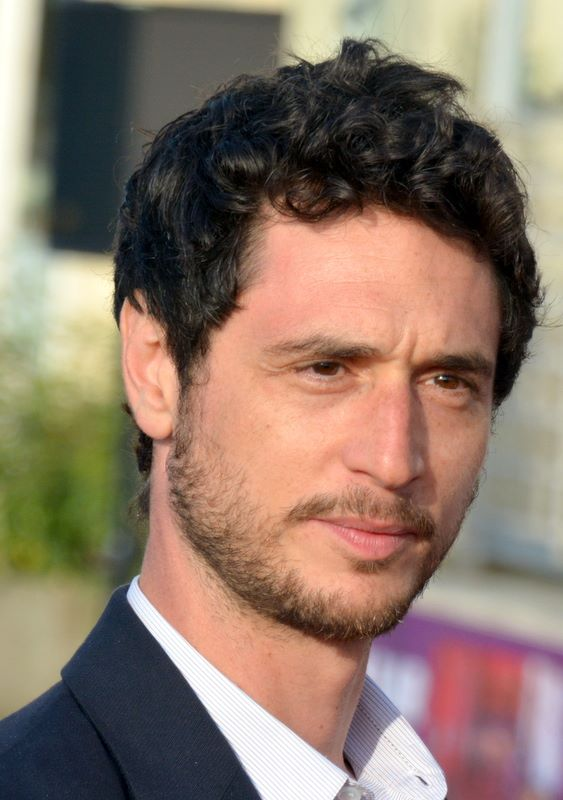
- Elkaïm in 2015
- Born: Jérémie Elkaïm; 29 August 1978 (age 48)
- Occupations: Actor, screenwriter, film director, producer
- Years active: 1998–present
- Children: 3

Jérémie Elkaïm (born 29 August 1978) is a French actor, screenwriter and film director best known for his role in Presque rien (US title: Come Undone, 2000). In the film, he plays Mathieu, a troubled, emotionally fragile teen who finds himself in a whirlwind romance with Cédric (played by Stéphane Rideau). His performance in the film garnered him much critical acclaim.

Other notable films starring the actor include the comedy teen flick Sexy Boys (2001), which is touted to be the French version of American Pie, À cause d'un garçon (U.S. title: You'll Get Over It, 2002), where he plays yet another gay teenager, and Mariées mais pas trop in which he plays an insurance investigator. His latest role was the lead in the comedy film Les Bêtises.

He has also appeared in television, as 30-year-old Paul Delorme in the TV series Le Bureau (2006), the French version of The Office currently seen on Canal+. Paul often plays pranks on officemate Joël Liotard (Benoît Carré), and shows a level of attraction towards receptionist Laetitia Kadiri (Anne-Laure Balbir). His character is the French equivalent of the British version's Tim Canterbury (played by Martin Freeman) and the American version's Jim Halpert (played by John Krasinski).

== Personal life ==
Elkaïm was born into a Moroccan Jewish family. He had a long-term relationship with actress/director Valérie Donzelli, with whom he still has a strong bond. They have two children together, and their story was the inspiration to Valérie's award-winning movie Declaration of War.

Since 2014, he has been in a relationship with his Marguerite & Julien co-star Anaïs Demoustier. They have a daughter who was born in March 2016.

== Filmography ==
=== Television ===
- 2009: Douce France, directed by Stéphane Giusti
- 2008: Clara Sheller, Mathieu
- 2008: X Femmes, Season 1, Episode 1
- 2006: "Le Bureau" (mini), Paul Delorme
- 2004: La Nourrice, Mathieu
- 2002: Zone Reptile, Jacky

=== Films ===
- 2016: The Girl Without Hands, directed by Sébastien Laudenbach
- 2016: Faultless (Irréprochable), directed by Sébastien Marnier
- 2015: Les Bêtises, directed by Rose and Alice Philippon
- 2015: Marguerite and Julien, directed by Valérie Donzelli
- 2011: Declaration of War, directed by Valérie Donzelli
- 2011: Belleville Tokyo, directed by Élise Girard
- 2011: Polisse, directed by Maïwenn
- 2010: La Reine des pommes, directed by Valérie Donzelli
- 2009: La Grande Vie, directed by Emmanuel Salinger
- 2007: Lisa et le pilote d'avion
- 2006:
  - The Untouchable
  - Le Funambule
- 2003: Mariées mais pas trop, Thomas
- 2003: Qui a tué Bambi?, Ami de Sami
- 2002: À cause d'un garçon, Benjamin
- 2001:
  - Sexy Boys, Frank
  - Pornographe, Le
  - Petite sœur, Le jeune homme
  - La Gueule du loup
  - Folle de Rachid en transit sur Mars
- 2000:
  - Presque rien, Mathieu
  - Banqueroute, The dancer
  - Les Éléphants de la planète Mars
- 1999: Transit, Le chanteur
- 1998:
  - Scènes de lit, Paul in 'The Virgins'
  - Un léger différent
