= Maigret and the Nahour Case =

1966 detective novel by Georges Simenon

Maigret and the Nahour Case (French: Maigret et l'affaire Nahour) is a 1966 detective novel by the Belgian writer Georges Simenon featuring Jules Maigret of the French Judicial police. It was written in Épalinges, Switzerland and first published by Presses de la Cité on 10 December 1966. 93rd in the series, was first translated into English by Alastair Hamilton in 1967, and was produced as a French teleplay starring Jean Richard in 1978.

== Synopsis ==
A man brings an apparently wealthy woman who has been shot in the back to Dr. Pardon at around one in the morning. Fortunately the wound is superficial – as is their story. He calls his friend Maigret shortly afterwards about the strange event, and Maigret and his wife having had an enjoyable dinner at his home notwithstanding, Inspector Maigret trudges back through the cold January night. He is soon enough dealing with the murder of the woman's husband, a jet set professional gambler, tight-lipped Lebanese monoglots (supposedly), and the wealthy Columbian student with whom she'd fled to Amsterdam.

== Gallery ==
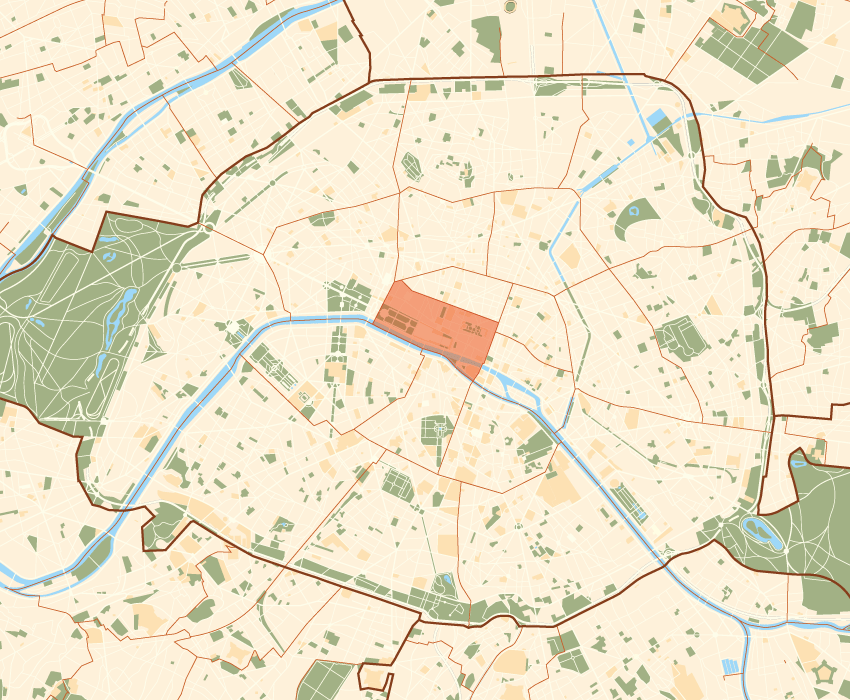
1st arrondissement

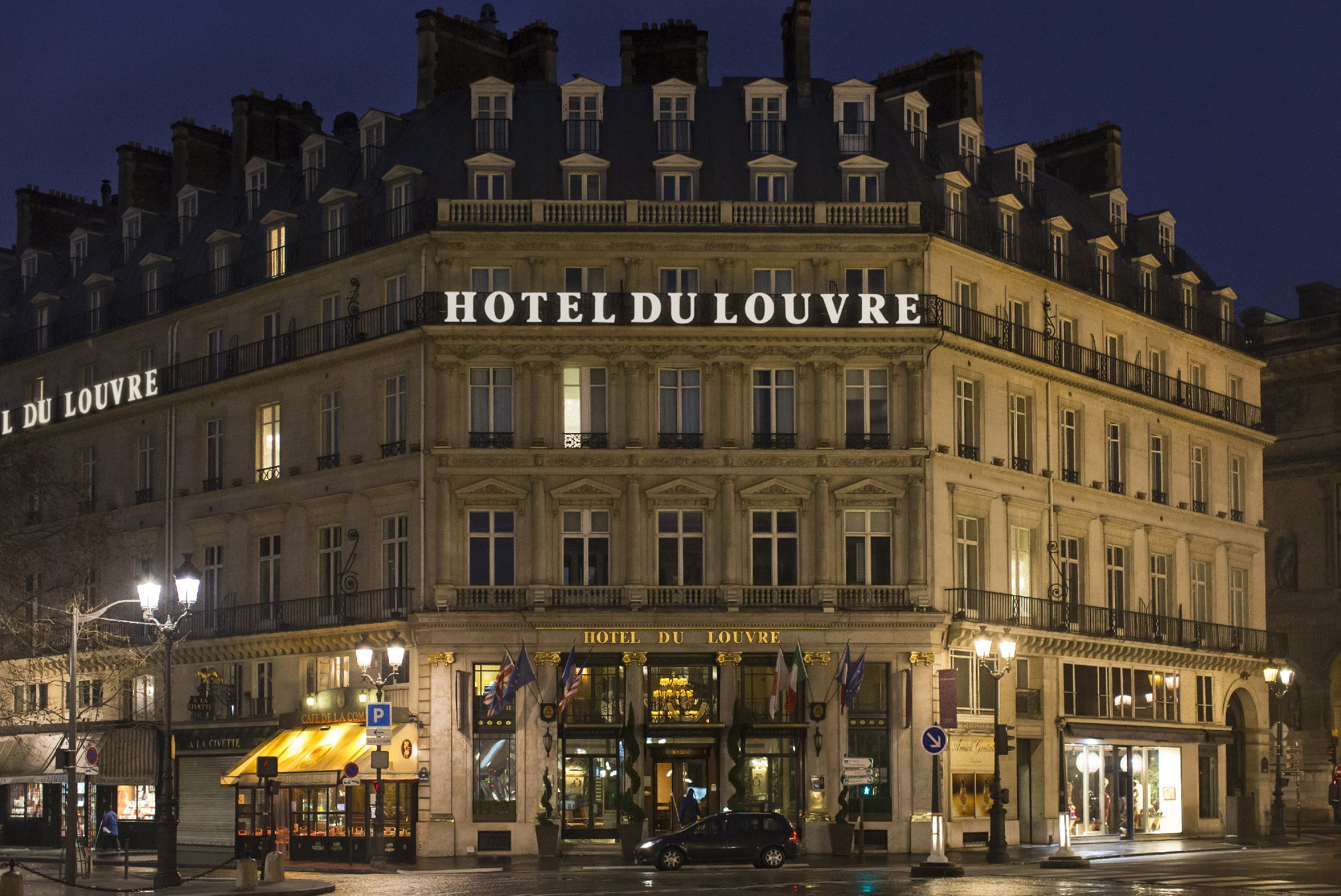
Hôtel du Louvre

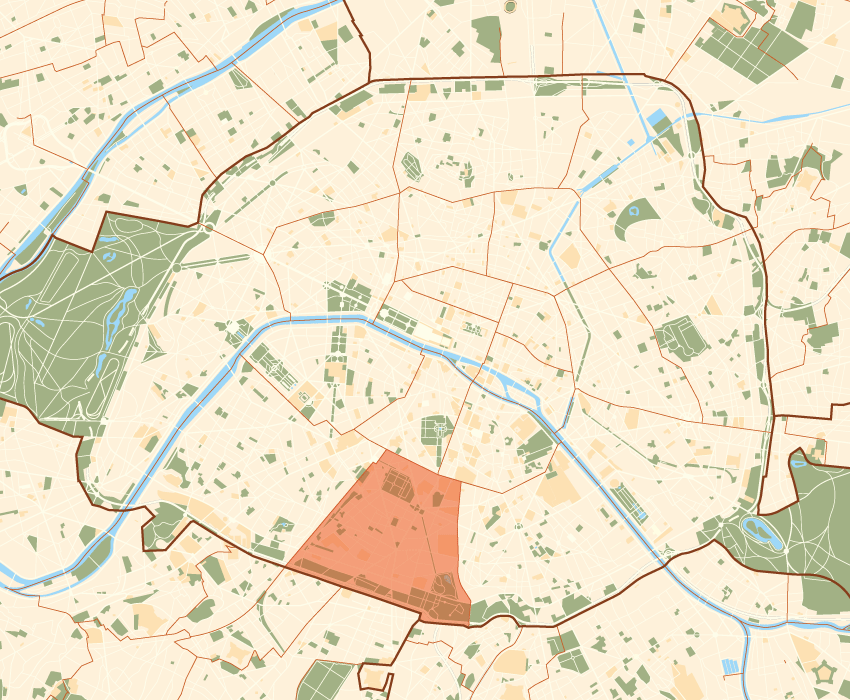
14th arrondissement

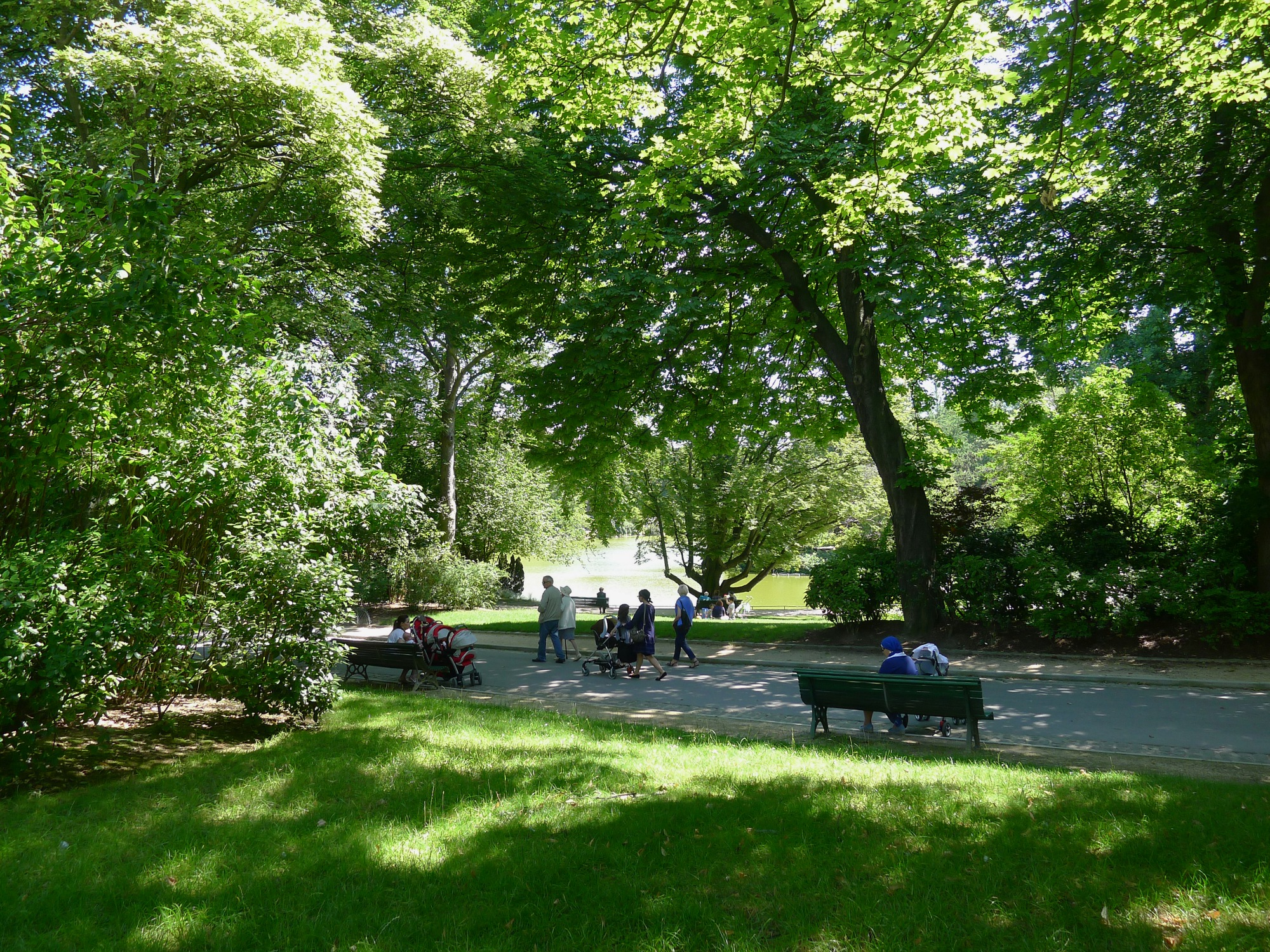
Parc Montsouris
