= The Screen Illusion =

French TV film directed by Mathieu Amalric

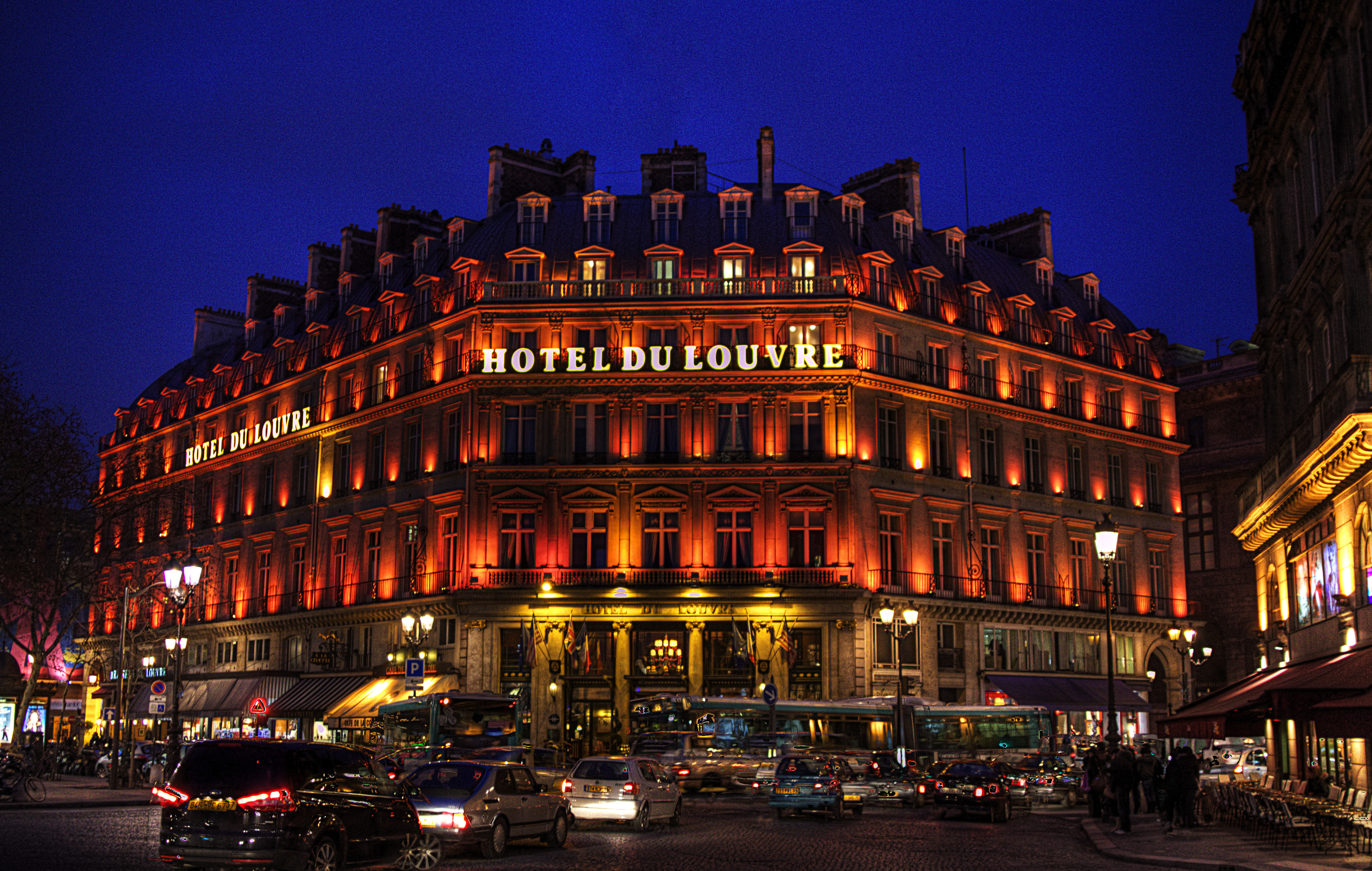
- The Hôtel du Louvre, where the film was shot
- Screenplay by: Corneille adapted by Mathieu Amalric
- Directed by: Mathieu Amalric
- Starring: Alain Lenglet, Hervé Pierre, Loïc Corbery, Denis Podalydès, Suliane Brahim
- Country of origin: France

Production
- Running time: 77 minutes
- Production companies: Comédie-Française and France Télévisions

Original release
- Network: France 2
- Release: 17 December 2010

The Screen Illusion is a French television film directed by Mathieu Amalric and aired on 17 December 2010, on France 2. It is a loose adaptation of Corneille's play L'Illusion Comique from 1636. This work, which is not a recording, was made with the actors of the Comédie-Française, the sponsoring institution of the work, but in an original staging conceived by Mathieu Amalric, different from that of Galin Stoev performed at the Comédie-Française starting from December 2008, partly concurrently.

Due to its formal originality, this TV film received multiple official selections in various European and American film festivals between 2011 and 2012. Consequently, it gradually gained a full-fledged cinematographic status and received positive critical acclaim in France and intentionally.

== Synopsis ==
After nearly eight years without news from his son, who ran away from home as a teenager, Pridamant received a letter on the morning of 26 May 2011, (Note: Shot in 2010 and released the same year, both the film and the work deliberately play with the anticipation, even the uchrony, of its narrative.) through a private detective agency. The letter invited him to meet Alcandre, the concierge of the Hôtel du Louvre, who can provide him with information. Using a pair of gold keys as a code, he presents himself at the hotel reception where Alcandre introduces him to the hotel's surveillance video room. Together, they watch the videotapes of the past years showing Clindor, who has become a dynamic young executive and the secretary of Matamore, a war video game producer. Matamore signs Clindor the task of seducing Isabelle, the daughter of the wealthy Géronte, a businessman surrounded by ominous bodyguards. However, Isabelle is also the mistress of Adraste, who is imposed on her by her father. She works with Clindor to negotiate contracts for video games and seems to have developed a passion for the brooding young man, no longer tolerating Adraste in her bed. Clindor plays a double game, seducing Isabelle to secure a lucrative marriage while remaining in love with poor Lyse, the assistant of the latter. Feeling betrayed, Lyse devises a trap to expose her lover: She contacts Géronte to reveal his daughter's deceit and invites Adraste to witness the adultery. Clindor and Isabelle are caught together on the hotel rooftops as they try to save Matamore from a pseudo-suicide. Chased by bodyguards and Adraste, Clindor kills the latter with Matamore's pistol. Clindor is imprisoned in the hotel's cellars, lamenting his fate while awaiting death, and Isabelle despairs her condemned lover by destroying her father's Jaguar XJ40 with clubs and axes. Lyse arrives and offers Isabelle a way to save Clindor by claiming she has seduced the jailer and can release him on the condition of payment and fleeing. Isabelle agrees and offers her pearl necklace as payment. After the deal is made, Lyse arranges for Clindor's illicit release: now wealthy, she leaves with the jailer, and Clindor is forced to flee with Isabelle, now penniless.

Pridamant is hocked by what he has witnessed. Alcandre asks him to wait and takes him to the evening of 26 May to observe his son. Alcandre warns Pridamant of the danger Clindorfacea and gives him a revolver. He discovers Clindor in a hotel nightclub, declaring passionately his love to a woman from behind whom he mistakes for Rosine, his new lover. The woman is Isabelle in a wig, revealing Clindor's infidelity and true feelings. Clindor decides to break up with Rosine, whom he is walking towards. Pridamant is devastated by Clindor's actions and uses the weapon provided by Alcandre to shoot his son. Fleeing into the hotel's cellars, he decides to shoot himself in the head. However, he discovers the bullets are blanks. He realizes the whole scene was only an "illusion" created for a film, with Clindor and Isabelle as actors from the start.

"Trust only your eyes."

— Alcandre

After completing his task, Alcandre returnsearly in the morning to the hotel to sleep. He writes as a conclusion the introductory letter and dedication that Corneille addresses to Mademoiselle M. F. D. R., to be posted with the cassette of "Clindor" to its dedicatee.

== Technical data ==
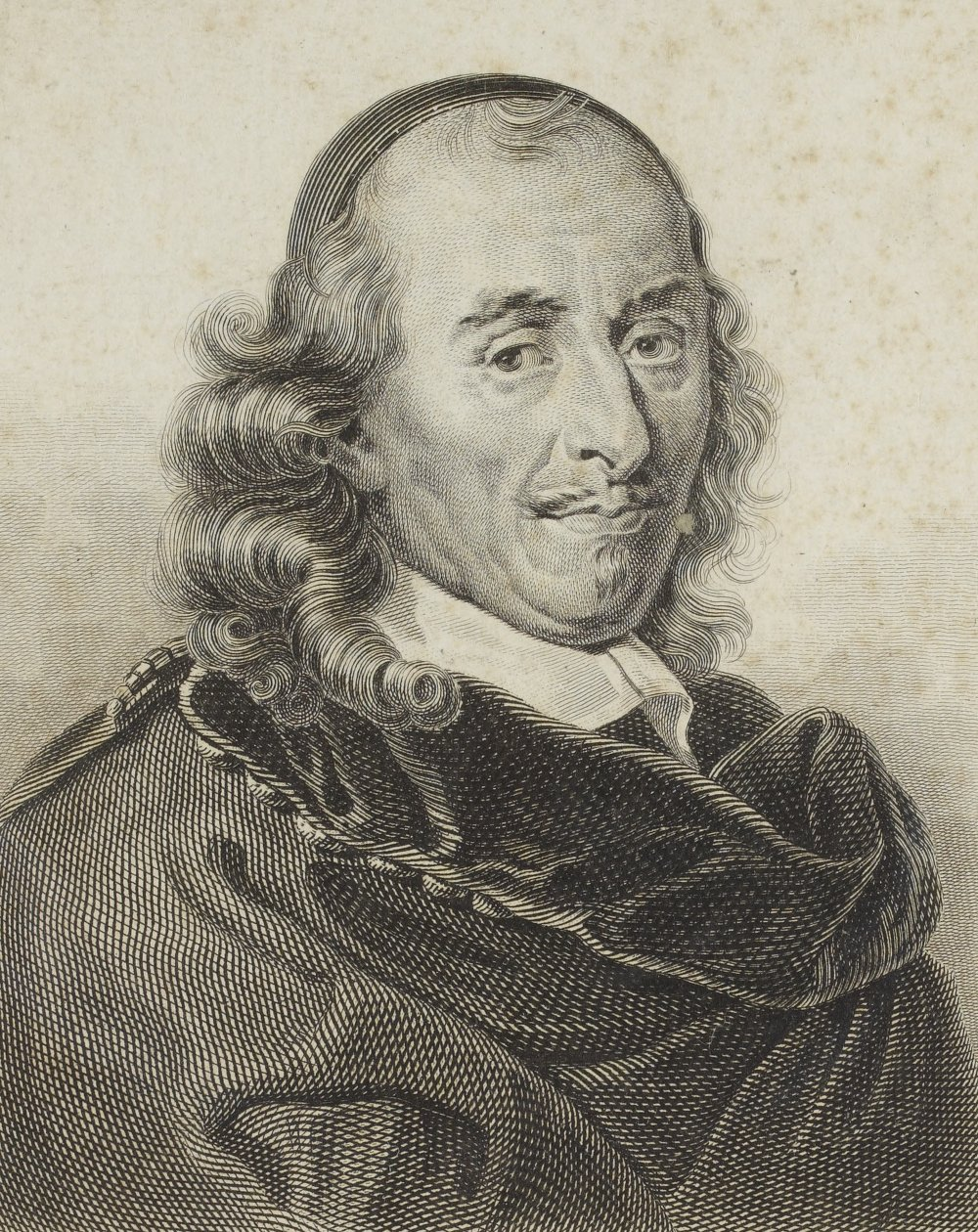
Pierre Corneille

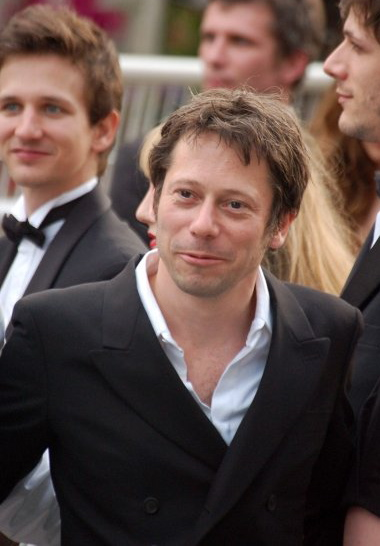
Mathieu Amalric

- Original title: L'Illusion comique
- International title: The Screen Illusion
- Director: Mathieu Amalric (assisted by Elsa Amiel)
- Screenplay: based on Pierre Corneille's play L'Illusion Comique, adapted by Mathieu Amalric
- Cinematographer: Isabelle Razavet
- Sound: Olivier Mauvezin
- Sets: Hervé Dajon
- Costumes: Élisabeth Mehu
- Editing: Annette Dutertre and Séverin Favriau
- Original music: Martin Wheeler
- Line producers: Gilles Sandoz, Hugues Charbonneau, Pierre Thoretton
- Production companies: Maïa Cinéma, Les Films de Pierre, la Comédie-Française and participation by France Télévisions and the CNC
- Film distribution company: Le Pacte
- Broadcast date: 17 December 2010 on France 2
- Screenings at Comédie-Française: 11 and 26 February 2012
- DVD release: 3 December 2013
- Running time: 77 minutes

== Cast ==
- Alain Lenglet: Pridamant, Clindor's father
- Hervé Pierre: Alcandre, hotel concierge
- Loïc Corbery: Clindor
- Denis Podalydès: Matamore
- Suliane Brahim: Isabelle, Géronte's daughter
- Julie Sicard: Lyse, Isabelle's assistant
- Adrien Gamba-Gontard: Adraste, Isabelle's courtier
- Muriel Mayette: Rosine
- Jean-Baptiste Malartre: Géronte
- Nicolas Wansycki: The jailer
- Cyril Hutteau: Bodyguard
- John Sehil: The bartender

== Project and realization of the film ==
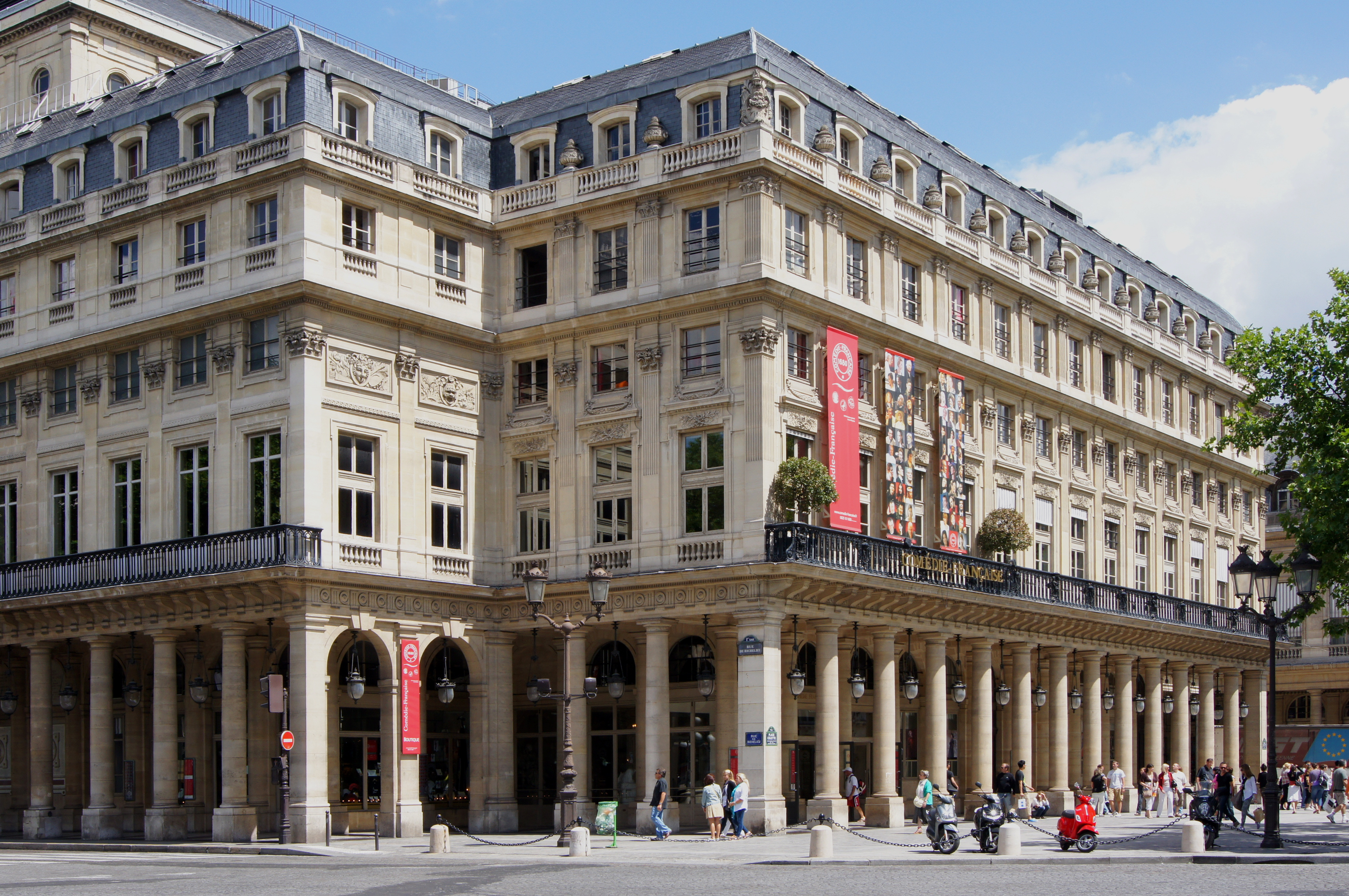
The Comédie-Française.

After completing his previous film, On Tour, released in 2010, Mathieu Amalric was entrusted by Muriel Mayette, the administrator of the Comédie-Française, and France Télévisions with the television adaptation of Pierre Corneille's play L'Illusion Comique. This project is part of a collection aimed at revisiting the classic repertoire of the institution under the camera of singular directors given the freedom to adapt works from the previous season at the French theater. Among the possible plays proposed to him, Mathieu Amalric chose this one, notably due to the alexandrine verses that he wanted to "extract from the stage text, move away from the capture, invent something that can only be told in cinema," but also because he found this work features "a grammar close to cinema, with flashbacks and flashforwards" and a great "modernity of feelings."

Before working on this play, Mathieu Amalric had never been involved in theater, either as an actor or as a director. (Note: Mathieu Amalric will make his theatrical debut the following year in Mefausti, directed by Damien Odoul at Les Bouffes du Nord, where he will play the role of Faust. "Mathieu Amalric se lance au théâtre avec Faust, une "vengeance contre la timidité"". L'Express (in French). 6 September 2011.) However, he had been exposed to the theater world since childhood, thanks to his mother who was a critic at Le Monde. In his youth, he lived with theater actor friends who were preparing for the conservatory, and as an adult, he lived with theater actresses. The play, classical texts, and the constraints of theater were therefore not entirely unfamiliar to him. For this project, he collaborated with the actors from the stage performances (the filming took place during the same period as the live performances directed by Galin Stoev and had to be done with exactly the same cast (Note: With the exception of Suliane Brahim, in the role of Isabelle, replacing Judith Chemla, who left the Comédie-Française in the meantime.)). The decision was made to create a completely different, contemporary adaptation of the play originally written in 1636. In ten days, Amalric wrote the screenplay and outlined the main direction lines, setting the action in modern times at the Hôtel du Louvre, located in Place André-Malraux, opposite the French theater. This choice was made to meet practical constraints to succeed at a lower cost and to film the entire play with a simple Canon digital camera in just twelve days. This artistic staging was inspired by Jean-Luc Godard's film Détective (1985), which also used this hotel technique to create multiple locations for the actions.

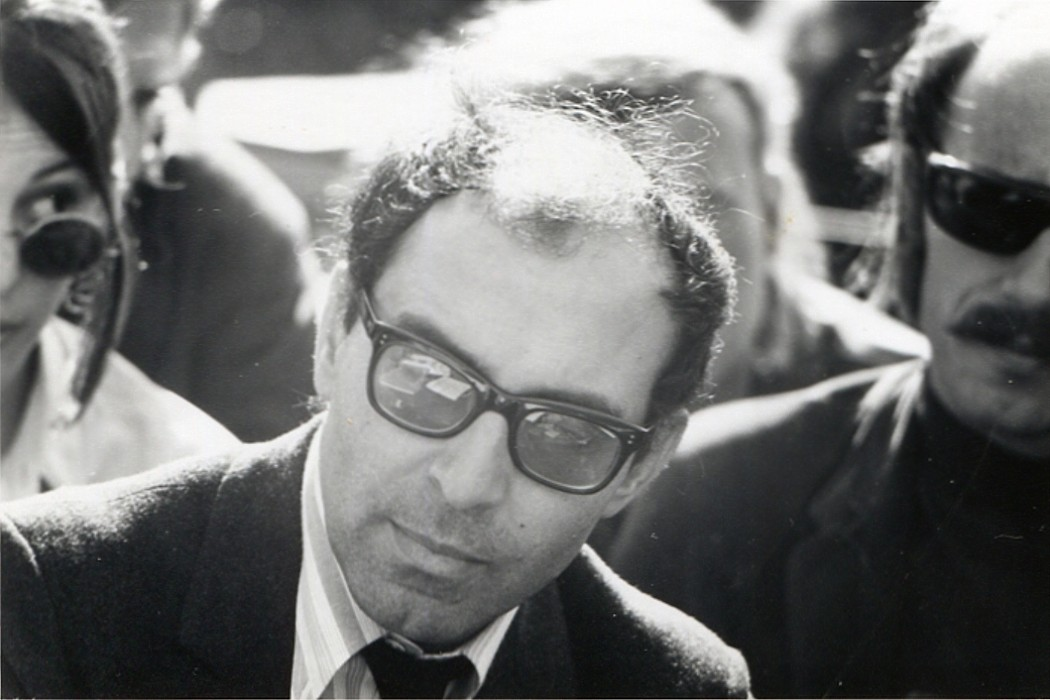
Jean-Luc Godard's Détective inspired Mathieu Amalric to set the scene in a hotel.

The television format requires Mathieu Amalric to make significant cuts in the dialogue, retaining only 500 out of the 1825 verses of the play remain, to adhere the time constraints imposed for television films and to enhance the credibility of the action. Despite the reductions, the preserved dialogues are main faithful to the original text. Among his directorial choices, for example, Amalric decides to reduce Pridamant's dialogues, the father, and focus instead on the visual impact inspired by the actor Alain Lenglet, drawing inspiration from the character of Jef Costello in Jean-Pierre Melville's Le Samouraï. Additionally, Amalric transposes the fantastical elements of the play, such as the magician's cave and the period tricks suggested in the text, into a contemporary and highly technological context. Alcandre becomes the hotel concierge and his internal video circuit, the means by which he shows Pridamant the last two years lived by Clindor to his father. For instance, Matamore's fake battles are reimagined as the development of the video game Call of Duty: Modern Warfare 2, with a business dinner featuring Japanese producers offering a katana as a gift. The final act involves a film set where Clindor and Isabelle play actors, deceiving Pridamant. In this sole scene, Mathieu Amalric takes a liberty from the original plot introducing a fake assassination of Clindor by his father and a subsequent attempted suicide after his pseudo-infanticide. Through the process of adapting Corneille's theme of theater within a theater to modern times through film within film and video technology, Amalric creates a triple mise en abyme of the theme of "illusion" explored in the play, building on his previous work in La Chose publique (2003).

The filming took place in early spring 2010 with a team of ten people on set. They used a simple Canon EOS-1Ds Mark III camera with various high-quality lenses. Mathieu Amalric chose to use the hotel's diverse locations for the film, including rooms, corridors, stairs, bar, kitchens, various basements and parking lots, video surveillance room, and hotel roofs, where the characters are mostly in motion. The director incorporated the warm colors of the hotel's decor (yellows, browns, reds) with the primary colors of the costumes (blues, reds, greens), often enhancing the saturation of tones. Only a few scenes were shot outdoors, including Place de la Concorde and the banks of the Seine, as well as a suburban pavilion that opens the film. The proximity of the Comédie-Française and the Hôtel du Louvre allowed the actors to spend more time per day playing the scenes, filming scenes and sticking to the strict schedule. Editing and mixing took place in May While Mathieu Amalric was travelling between Paris and the Cannes Film Festival, where he presented his film On Tour and received the Best Director Award.

== Television broadcast and festival presentations ==
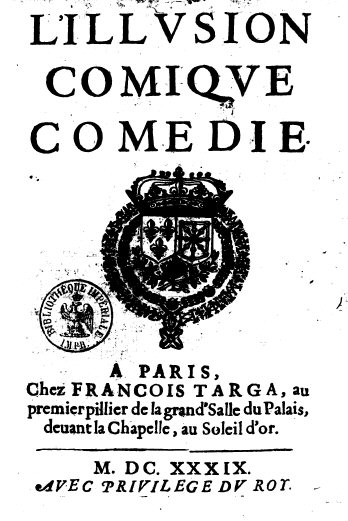
1639 edition of L'Illusion Comique.

The telefilm first aired on television on 17 December 2010, on France 2 in the late-night slot, gathering 350,000 viewers which accounted for a 2.4% audience share according to Médiamétrie.

The Screen Illusion then begins a second phase of its career, exclusively on the international big screen, distributed by Le Pacte. The film was often presented by Mathieu Amalric himself, who conducted Q&A sessions with audiences. It was featured in official selections at events such as the 40th International Film Festival Rotterdam on 31 January 2011; the São Paulo International Film Festival in October 2011; the 55th BFI London Film Festival on October 19–20–22, 2011, the Turin Film Festival on 26 November 2011; and the Chicago International Film Festival on 7 and 8 October 2012. Additionally, it was showcasted at various local French film festivals abroad (including screenings at the Walter Reade Theater at Lincoln Center in New York City, the Seattle International Film Festival, and the Museum of Fine Arts in Boston). The Screen Illusion was also scheduled for screenings at the "Théâtre éphémère" at the Comédie-Française on 11 and 26 February 2012.

On 3 December 2013, the DVD of the film was released, without any additional content or bonuses, by Montparnasse Editions, which published the entire collection of works and plays from the Comédie-Française.

== Critical reception ==
=== In France ===
Benoît Rivière of Les Inrockuptibles judges that the transposition choices are "a success of Amalric's adaptation," noting that he "has managed to find an incredible space of freedom from these demands." He also commends Suliane Brahim's performance as Isabelle. Le Point describes "this adaptation perfectly intelligent" with a "lightness of the camera" resulting in a "graceful" outcome. 20 Minutes compares the final result "much more to a thriller than a theatrical capture," a sentiment shared by other critics. Armelle Héliot in Le Figaro writes that Amalric's adaptation maintains "the liveliness" of the play, that he "dares breathtaking transpositions" that are "bold but right," achieving "feats" of conciseness on a play that he fully masters. This critical reception contrasts the vast majority of press articles on the play in its staging by Galin Stoev, premiered on 6 December 2008, at the Salle Richelieu at the Comédie-Française, which were particularly negative about the choices made by the Bulgarian director.

In June 2012, the film was selected by Marie-Madeleine Mervant-Roux for a cinematic dossier in the Positif magazine focusing on the theme of "Adaptation Today," in which the researcher analyzes the success of the exercise by Mathieu Amalric. She compares Amalric's direction to Giorgio Strehler’s staging at the Théâtre de l'Odéon in Paris, 1984, noting their ability of capture the true essence of Corneille's play. She emphasizes that the film's achievement lies not in the special effects or their modern versions found by Mathieu Amalric (devices into which many critics have fallen, according to her) but rather the transition from comedy to reality, notably through the "regression towards a form of psychodramatic and interactive theater in Act V." Moreover, she highlights the playwright's central role in asserting his authority over the actors and his work.

This adaptation of The Screen Illusion by Mathieu Amalric, known for its "feverish pace and contemporary vision" is, several years after its realization, regularly praised as an example of intrinsic and collaborative success between the Comédie-Française and the filmmakers invited to adapt the works from the institution's repertoire.

=== Abroad ===
Despite its focus on classic French verse theater, the film has also received positive reviews in the Anglo-Saxon specialized press. Press has considered it as "vividly inventive" with Amalric's "vision of the play never forced," all served by a "stellar cast at their best" for a "perfect fusion of theater and cinema." A parallel is drawn between this work and Michael Almereyda's film Hamlet (2000) with The Screen Illusion being considered "more convincing" in its form by some critics. Moreover, comparisons have been made with Andrea Arnold's film Red Road (2006; Jury Prize at the 2006 Cannes Film Festival) for its use of surveillance cameras, showcasing "Amalric's fascination with the visual language of films and the absolute reign of the image," which can sometimes lead to "serious misinterpretations." These positive reviews are shared by the critic from Variety, that describes the adaptation as "terrific" and considers that the cuts made by Amalric allow to "streamlines the story and makes the narrative easy to follow without simplifying Corneille's ideas." The quality of the English translation of the subtitles has also been commended, a judgment frequently shared by Anglo-Saxon critics, which also respects the alexandrines without attempting to replicate the rhymes, Many critics believe that "this delightful pic could easily make the leap to art screens worldwide" which it did during the 2011–2012. The Time Out London considers the adaptation to be "an original concept of astonishing and imaginative modernity."

Despite receiving positive reviews, and although he describes the film as "inspired and clever [...] perfectly interpreted by the ensemble cast," John Soltes considers that the film "could have been even better" by taking a more radical choice of abandoning the theatrical style for a more cinematic approach to "resonate," regretting that "the experience, although very enjoyable, falls short." Similarly, the review from the Italian newspaper Il Sole 24 Ore, on the occasion of the film's presentation in Turin, remains skeptical of the film, considering this "transposition of a seventeenth-century play is interesting" but "blocked by Amalric's overly ambitious goals, unable to smoothly convey the contrast between reality and fiction that he has staged." (Note: Original quote in Italian: «Il film rimane bloccato dai troppo ambiziosi obiettivi del suo autore, incapace di districarsi fluidamente nel contrasto tra realtà e finzione che ha portato in scena.»)
