= L'Illusion Comique =

1636 play by Pierre Corneille

L'Illusion comique
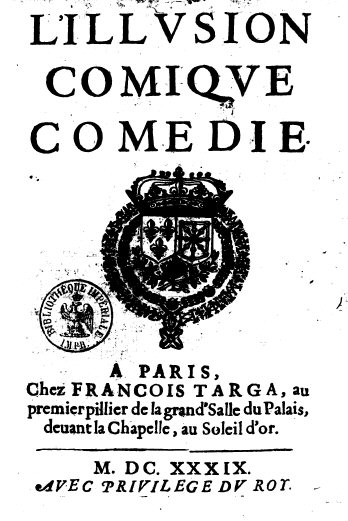
- title page from the 1639 edition
- Written by: Pierre Corneille
- Characters: Alcandre; Pridamant; Dorante; Clindor; Isabelle; Géronte; Matamore; Adraste
- Original language: French
- Genre: comedy
- Setting: A grotto in Touraine (Act I); Bordeaux (Acts II-IV); Paris (Act V)

Premiere
- Date premiered: 1634
- Place premiered: Hôtel de Bourgogne

L'Illusion comique is a comedic play written by Pierre Corneille in 1636. In its use of meta-theatricality (plays-within-the-play), it is far ahead of its time. It was first performed at the Hôtel de Bourgogne in 1636 and published in 1639.

Corneille wrote this piece at the age of 29 and had already written seven other plays. L'Illusion comique marks a turning point in his career. This piece can be regarded as the end of an apprenticeship during which the author demonstrates his literary prowess. In this work, Corneille makes use of all theatre genres: the first act is a prologue that is inspired by the pastoral style, and the next three acts are an imperfect comedy with the farcical character Matamore at the center. The fourth and fifth acts evolve into a tragicomedy with their episodes of rivalry, imprisonment, and even death. L'Illusion comique is therefore a summary of a theatrical universe, and it is in this play that Corneille shows his mastery of theatre as a whole.

== Plot summary ==
- Act I. The first act begins at the entrance to a grotto where Pridamant and Dorante are trying to discover the cause of the disappearance of Clindor, Pridamant's son. Dorante wants to introduce Pridamant to a magician who can help. This magician, Alcandre, correctly determines the reasons why Pridamant has come to him and tells him that he can show him his son through a device. Alcandre asks Dorante to leave. After Dorante leaves, Alcandre tells Pridamant that his son is living the life of a picaro since his disappearance and that he is now in the service of a captain of soldiers in the region of Bordeaux.
- Act II. At the beginning of Act II, Alcandre and Pridamant are looking at the magician's instrument and are able to see Clindor and his master Matamore. Clindor is listening to Matamore brag about his impossible feats while waiting for the arrival of Isabelle, who appears accompanied by her official servant. Clindor and Matamore hide themselves; and Adraste approaches Isabelle. She rejects his advances but this does not keep him from asking her father for permission to marry her. After his departure, Matamore and Clindor come out of hiding and Matamore leaves when a page arrives to tell him that he has pressing affairs elsewhere. Alone with Clindor, Isabelle reaffirms her love for him. She flees when Adraste returns. Clindor also leaves, and Adraste begins to suspect that Clindor is his rival. Isabelle's servant, Lyse, tells Adraste he should go and spy on the two of them. Alone, Lyse reveals that she is in love with Clindor and hopes to get revenge on her mistress by sending Adraste. Alcandre tries to reassure Pridamant that all will be well for his son.
- Act III. The third act begins with the reproaches of Isabelle's father, Géronte, who wants her to marry Adraste. Alone, Géronte decides to force her to do his will. He then dismisses Matamore, who vows revenge. Lyse appears and Clindor tries to seduce her, pretending that he only loves Isabelle for her money. He leaves, and Lyse hesitates before continuing with her plot against the lovers. Matamore arrives on stage and hides himself when Isabelle and Clindor appear. Clindor and Isabelle try to kiss, when Adraste arrives with Géronte and his valets. Matamore flees, Clindor attacks Adraste, but Adraste strikes back. The final image is of Pridamant, who believes his son is dead.
- Act IV. Act IV opens with Isabelle's tragic monologue. Adraste is dead, Clindor is hurt and also sentenced to death. Isabelle vows that she will die. She is rejoined by Lyse who makes fun of her and then reassures her: Isabelle and Clindor can flee that night with Lyse and the jailer, who is now Lyse's lover. Isabelle goes to prepare her affairs, and Lyse admits that she didn't resent Clindor so much as to want his death. Isabelle runs across Matamore who has been in hiding for several days. She and Lyse make fun of him and chase him off. The jailer arrives to let them know that all is ready. They liberate Clindor from prison. Alcandre assures Pridamant that the foursome will find great fortune.
- Act V. Alcandre asks Pridamant to stay near him, as the young heroes arrive, completely changed. Isabelle appears at night, dressed as a princess in a palace garden to tell Lyse that her husband has a lover's meeting with Princess Rosine. Clindor arrives, and mistaking Rosine for Isabelle, declares his love for her. Isabelle reproaches him for his infidelities and reminds him that she left everything in order to follow him. Clindor reaffirms his love for her, but Isabelle threatens suicide. Clindor renounces Rosine just as Rosine arrives. Isabelle watches from the shadows as Clindor resists her advances. Suddenly, Prince Florilame's men enter and kill both Rosine and Clindor. Isabelle is taken to the prince, who is in love with her. Pridamant is beside himself, when Alcandre begins laughing. He reveals Clindor and the other characters alive and in the process of dividing money. Clindor and his friends have become actors and what Pridamant observed was their performance of the final act of a tragedy. The play ends with Alcandre's apology explaining the virtue of becoming an actor.

== Characters ==
- Alcandre, a magician.
- Pridamant, father of Clindor.
- Dorante, friend of Pridamant.
- Matamore, a captain.
- Clindor, son of Pridamant, lover of Isabelle.
- Isabelle, lover of Clindor.
- Adraste, in love with Isabelle.
- Géronte, Isabelle's father.
- Lise, Isabelle's servant, in love with Clindor.
- Rosine, an English princess.
- Florilame, the husband of Rosine.

== Interpretation ==
=== Structure ===
L'Illusion comique plays with the idea of theatre within the theatre and has many layers of representation:

- The first level is the entire play with its share of conflicts, complications, and dénouements.
- The second level is the scene between Alcandre and Pridamant, who are actors and spectators at the same time
- The third level is that of the young lovers, Clindor and Isabelle, and their adventures
- The fourth level is that of the play that is performed by Clindor and Isabelle in the final act

=== "The theatre of the world" ===
The complex structure of the play, based on a mise en abyme and a play on appearances is designed to confuse the reader. The game of illusions is found in the Baroque idea that life is a theatre; and Corneille exploits this idea by mixing the real life of Clindor and the role that he plays. Disguise and changing identity are marks of the Baroque in this play. The grotto can also be interpreted as a metaphor for the theatre and its spectators.

=== Instability ===
The linearity of the story is broken several times, and numerous digressions interrupt actions that overlap and are often incomplete. The principal story is interlaced with many subplots. The inconsistency of the plot is reinforced by the amorous inconsistency of the characters. This instability is present again at the end when Pridamant and the reader cannot distinguish between reality and fiction.

=== Disregard of the three unities ===
Corneille seems to disregard the three unities of classical theatre:

- the entanglement of the plots breaks the unity of action;
- two years pass between the end of act IV and the beginning of act V, which breaks the unity of time;
- the unity of place is in question: the first act is in Alcandre's grotto in Touraine, the three middle acts are in Bordeaux, and the final act is in Paris

L'Illusion comique was written during a period of transition from the Baroque to the Classical, and it can be seen as both a homage to the Baroque theatre as well as a satire of the same.

=== Other elements ===
==== Classicism ====
Although this piece is primarily Baroque, certain passages seem to follow the traditional lines of classical tragedy. In spite of the legerity of the plot concerning the lovers, the theme of death appears several times. Of course, there is the false death of Clindor which plunges the play into the atmosphere of tragedy; like Pridamant, the spectator is faced with emotions of terror and pity which are the two great theatrical sentiments according to Aristotle. However, the two passages that are the most classical in nature are the monologues of Isabelle (Act IV, scene 1) and of Clindor (Act IV, scene 7). Devastated by the judgment against her lover, Isabelle imagines her own death like the heroine of a tragedy. Moreover, she is not satisfied to follow Clindor in death; she also hopes to punish her father. As for Clindor, he uses his memory of Isabelle in order to overcome his fear of death. He exclaims: "I die glorious because I die for you!" For a moment, he falls back into despair, but ultimately, love allows him to transcend his thoughts and fears of death.

==== The Commedia dell'arte ====
The Commedia dell'arte is the principal source for the new theatre of the 17th century by bringing together a popular technique with the aesthetic development of the Renaissance in Italy. The Commedia dell'arte concerns itself mostly with the verbal and physical dexterity of the actors and relies heavily on improvisation. The character of Matamore is directly borrowed from this tradition as well as the juxtaposition of characters from several social classes. Matamore can be compared to Sganarelle, the valet of Don Juan.

==== The pastoral tradition ====
Pastoral theatre takes place in an idealized setting according to the ancient model of Arcadia. The first act of L'Illusion comique borrows several elements from the pastoral, including the grotto and the magician.

==== The "Tragi-comedy" ====
A tragicomedy uses characters that are relatively close to everyday life who are confronted with situations where emotions get in the way of actions. The mixture of death (tragedy) and marriage (comedy) is one manifestation of this.

== Adaptations ==
The play has enjoyed renewed popularity in recent years, since Tony Kushner adapted it as The Illusion.

The Comédie Française commissioned an adaptation in modern dress from the actor/director Mathieu Amalric and that film débuted on French television in 2010. Among other changes, Matamore has become the designer of a shooter video game, while the final act takes place in a night club.

Ranjit Bolt's translation was dramatized and broadcast on BBC Radio 3 on 25 September 2011 directed by Peter Kavanagh with original music composed and performed by Russell Taylor and Steve Cooke. The cast included: Richard Johnson as Alcandre, Michael Maloney as Clindor, John Sessions as Matamore, Hattie Morahan as Isabelle, Benjamin Whitrow as Géronte, Pip Torrens as Adraste, Rosie Fellner as Lyse, Paul Moriarty as Pridamant, Simon Bubb as Dorante and Victoria Inez-Hardy as Empress/Queen.

In 2012, a new adaptation of the play opened at Under St. Mark's in New York City. The production was adapted and directed by Kevin P. Joyce, and transposes the play from 17th century France to Turn-of-the-20th Century Louisiana, specifically the Atchafalaya Basin (Alcandre's lair), the Garden District (Isabelle's home) and a showboat (the Fifth Act). The role of Alcandre was rewritten for a woman and modeled after Marie Laveau. The production was directed by Mr. Joyce and featured Christopher Fayne as Pridamant, Rebeca Radozskowicz as Alcandre (understudied by Juanita Pearl Johnson), Matt Alford as Clindor, Alexandra Scardapane as Isabelle, Maisie Salinger as Lyse, Chris Lemieux as Matamore, Jesse Keitel as Adraste, Evan Pearson as Geronte, Andrew Meyer as Dorante/Jailer and Joshua Wise as the Page. It also featured music by PJ Rassmussen, designs by Justin West, Matsy Stintson, George Scholes Robson V, Vincent Coviello & Brian McManimon, as well as fight choreography by Brian Walters. The production received positive reviews from audiences but no reviews were publicly published due to the play's limited run.

The end credits of Illusion (2004 film) cite the play as its inspiration.
