= Avenue de l'Opéra =

Grand avenue in Paris, France

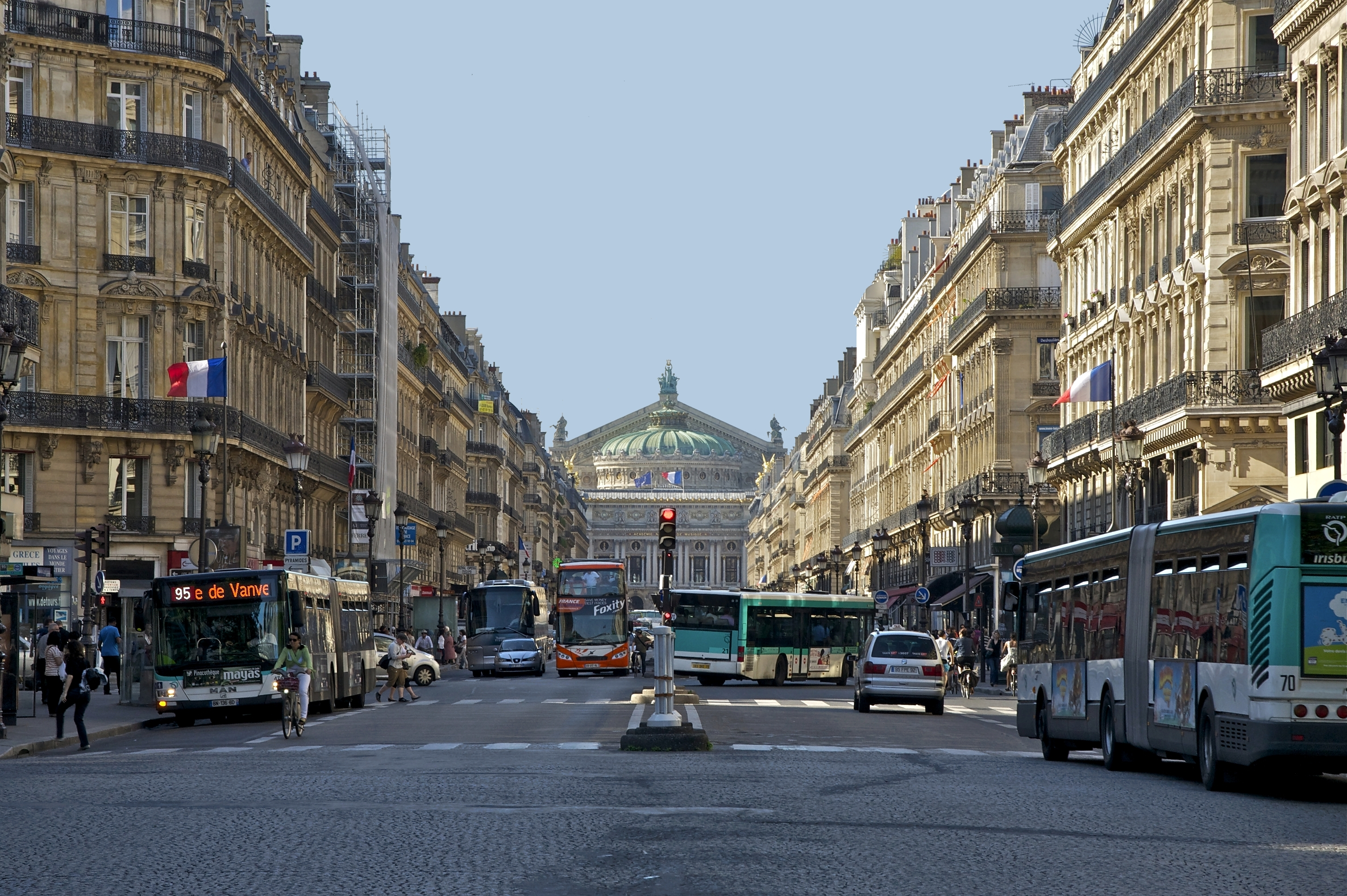
- Avenue de l'Opéra, Paris

- Location within Paris
- Length: 698 m (2,290 ft)
- Width: 30 m (98 ft)
- Arrondissement: 1st, 2nd
- Quarter: Palais Royal. Place Vendôme. Gaillon.
- Coordinates: 48°52′01.74″N 02°20′01.75″E
- From: 4 Place André-Malraux
- To: Boulevard des Capucines

Construction
- Completion: 1867
- Denomination: 10 December 1873

The Avenue de l'Opéra (French pronunciation: [avny d(ə) lɔpeʁa]) was created from 1864 to 1879 as part of Haussmann's renovation of Paris. It is situated in the centre of the city, running northwest from the Louvre to the Palais Garnier, the primary opera house of Paris (until the opening of the Opéra Bastille in 1989).

== Description ==
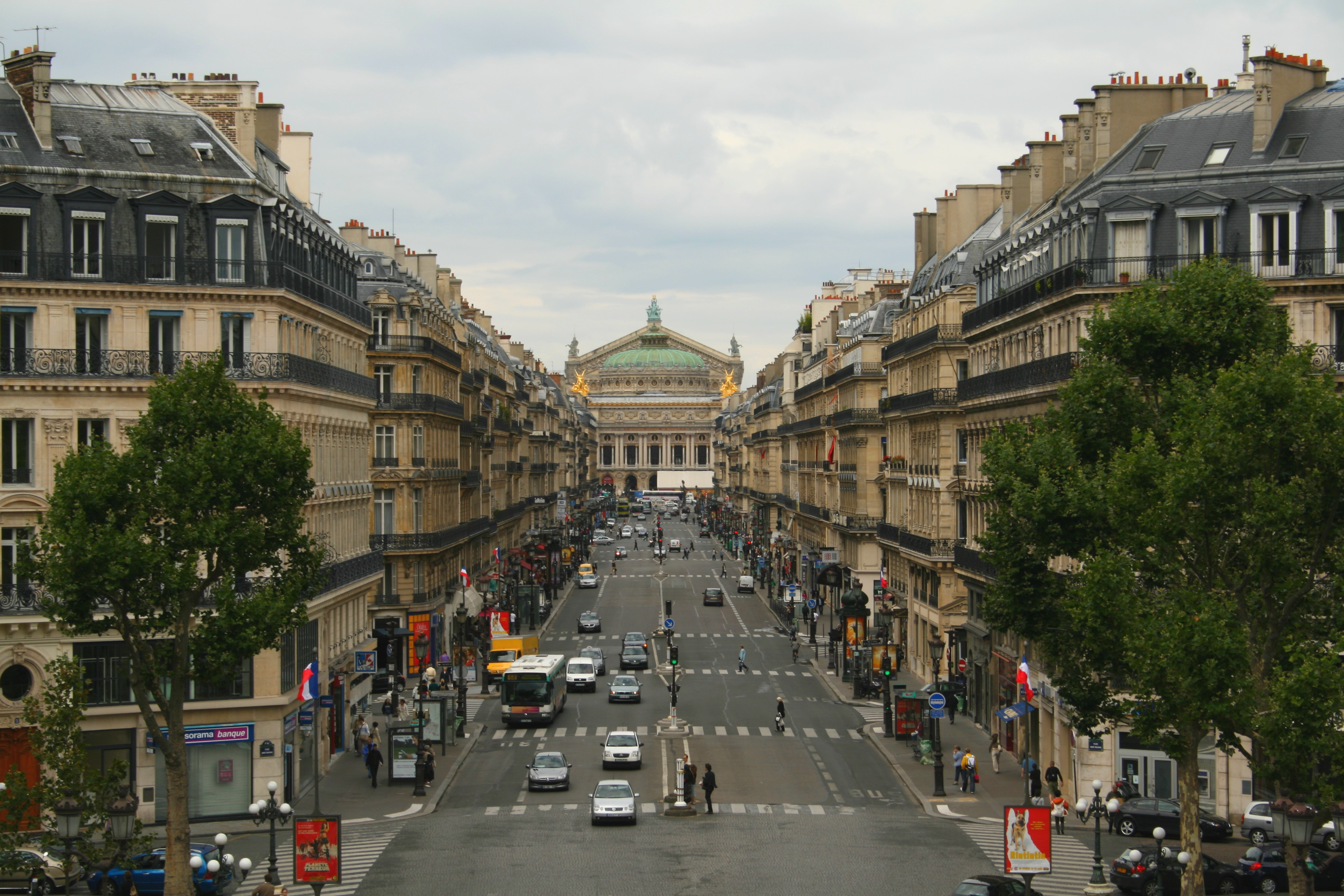
View toward the Opéra from the Hôtel du Louvre

The Avenue de l'Opéra was an important thoroughfare in Haussmann's traffic scheme, since it linked the Rue de Rivoli at the Louvre to the grands boulevards near the Opéra and gave better access to the wealthy neighbourhoods being developed at that time in northwest Paris. It had the additional advantage that the demolition required for its construction cleared the area between the Louvre and the grand boulevards, which had been occupied by a slum district, dense with poor-quality housing and numerous narrow streets, that was considered unhealthy and dangerous.

At the avenue's northwest end, in front of the opera house, is the Place de l'Opéra. Besides providing a setting for the imposing Palais Garnier, it is a nexus from which several streets radiate. At the time it was built, it was criticized for being too grandiose, but now with much more traffic, it is often considered too small. Elegant stores selling luxury leather goods and jewelry, and the Café de la Paix, are located here.

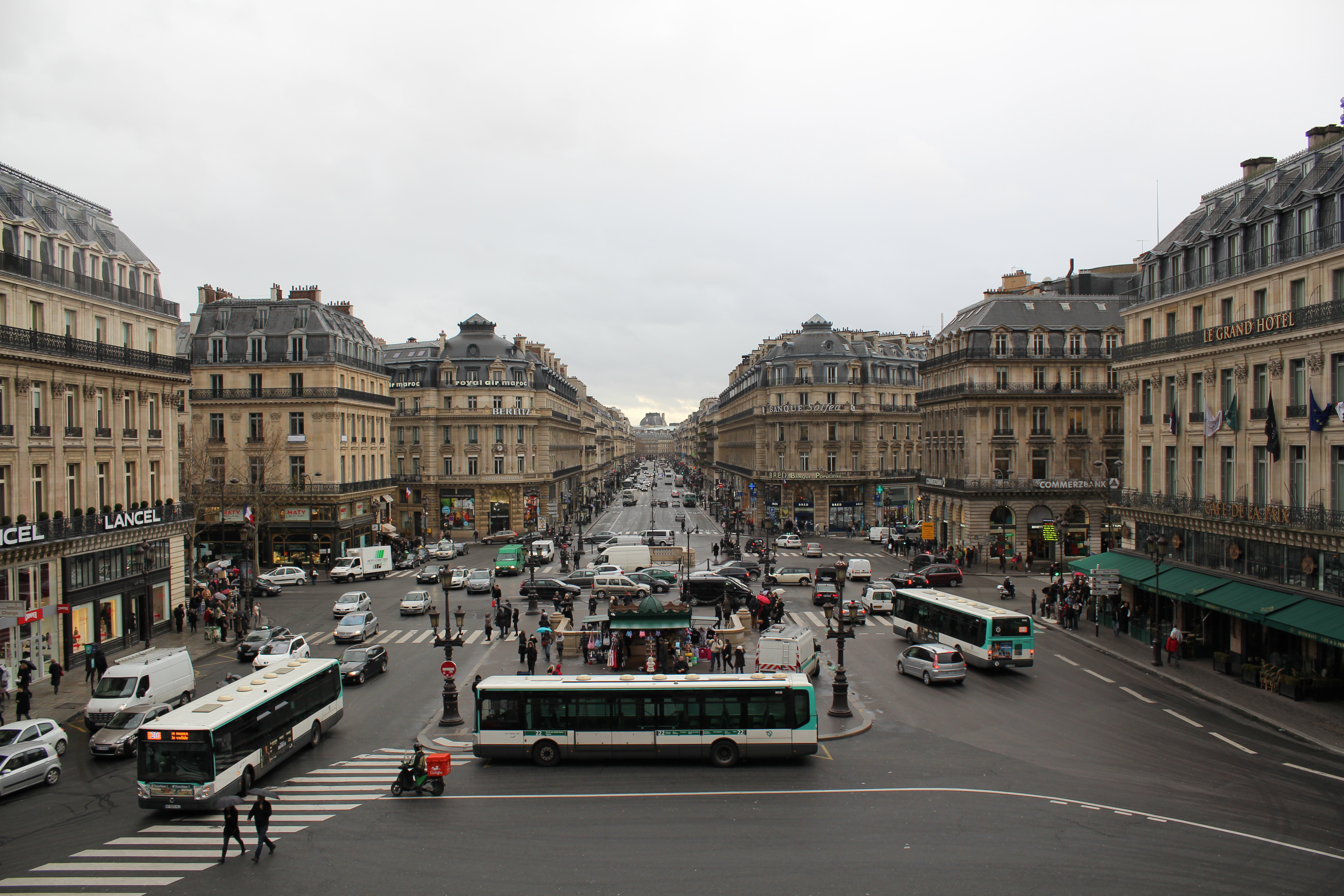
View toward the Louvre from the Opéra

The avenue itself is very popular with tourists and is lined with shops selling fancy souvenir Parisian merchandise (articles de Paris), as well as travel agencies and banks. A small Japanese district is nearby, in the Rue Sainte-Anne.

Unlike most Parisian avenues, there are no trees. This was the result of a compromise between Haussmann and Charles Garnier, the architect of the opera house, who desired the best view possible of the main facade of the Opera at the end of the avenue. He did not want the view to be obstructed by the leaves and branches.

At the avenue's southeast end, near the Louvre, is the Place André Malraux, named after the French writer André Malraux, who had been Minister of Cultural Affairs under Charles de Gaulle. The square was formerly known as the Place du Théâtre Français, after the theatre of the Comédie-Française, which is located here. Adjacent to the theatre is the Palais-Royal, famous for its gardens.

== History ==
Initially, the Butte Saint-Roch was located at the level of the current Rue des Pyramides. Joan of Arc installed guns (culverins) on it to support the attack against the Porte Saint-Honoré. The mount was lowered somewhat in 1615, but remained a serious obstacle. The enormous quantity of material produced by the leveling of this hill was used to fill the excavations of the Champ de Mars. Previously one had to descend seven steps to reach the entrance of the church of Saint-Roch, whereas now one must climb thirteen steps.

A decree of 3 May 1854 initiated a project to create an "Avenue Napoléon", running from the Louvre to the place where the Rue de la Paix joins the boulevards. However, little progress was made. In the early 1860s, the construction of the new opera house relaunched the project by a decree of 24 August 1864. Work began at each end but proceeded slowly. The fall of the Second Empire in 1870, caused a delay in the work, at least for a while, and in 1873 the boulevard was renamed Avenue de l'Opera. After a public decree of 27 June 1876, work resumed and was quickly completed. The last buildings along the avenue were built in 1879.

Number 22 is the address of the former Hotel des Deux Mondes, which closed in 1940. After the war, it became the Paris field office of the United States Secret Service.

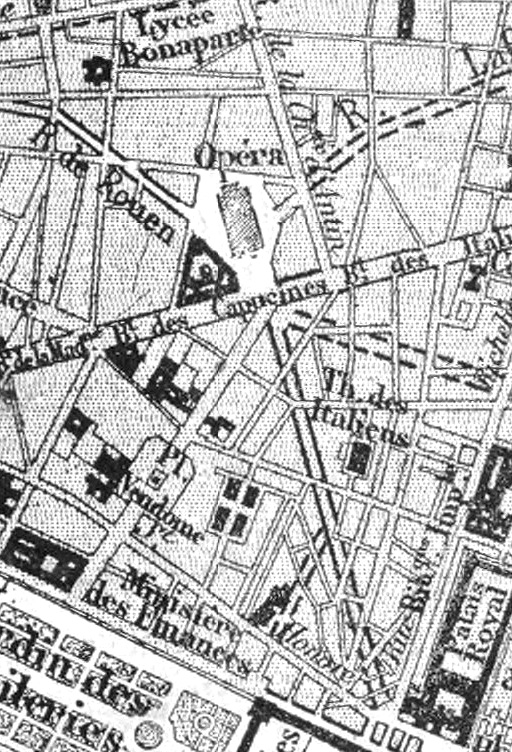
1869 map with projected route

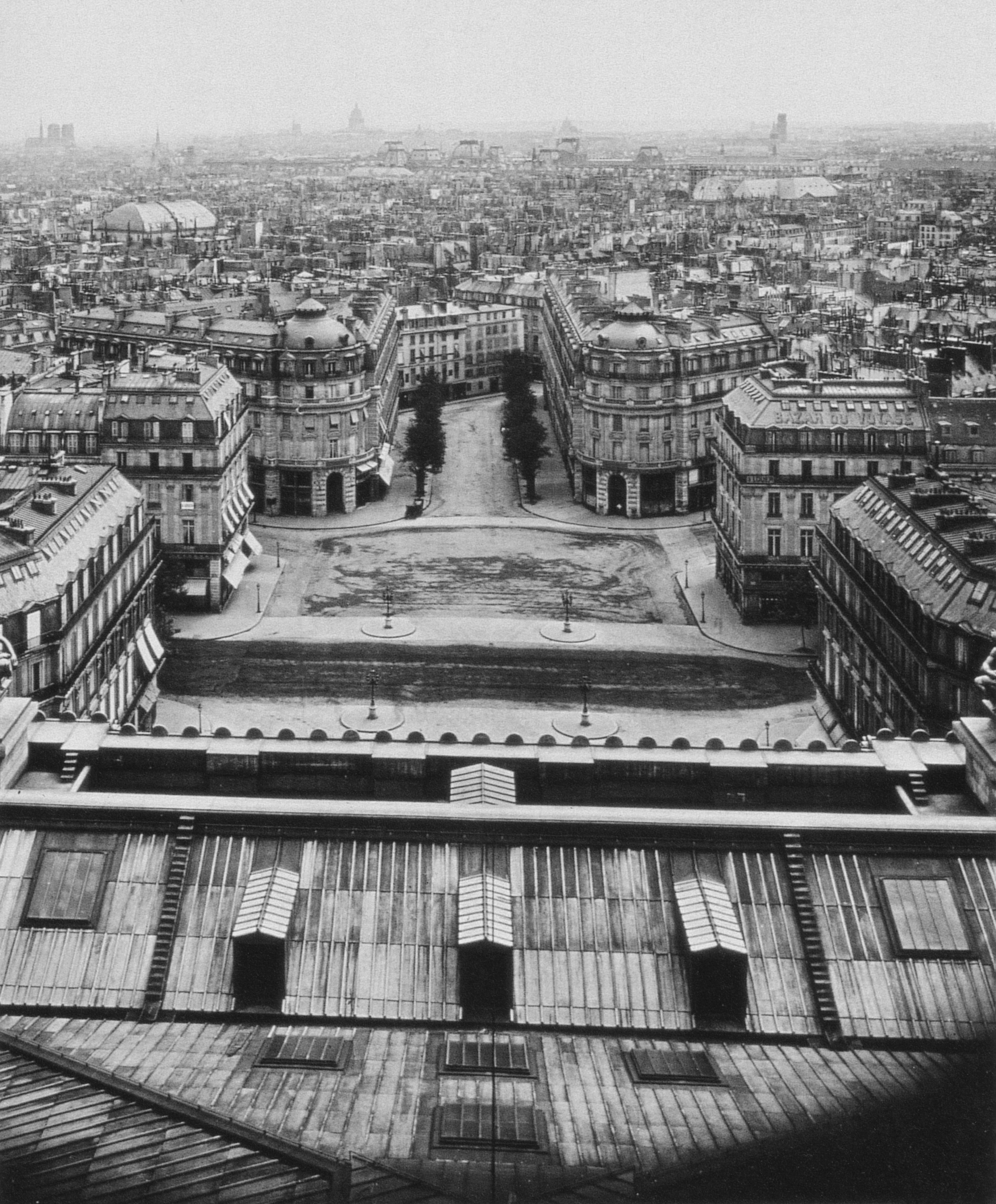
View of the Place de l'Opéra, c. 1870

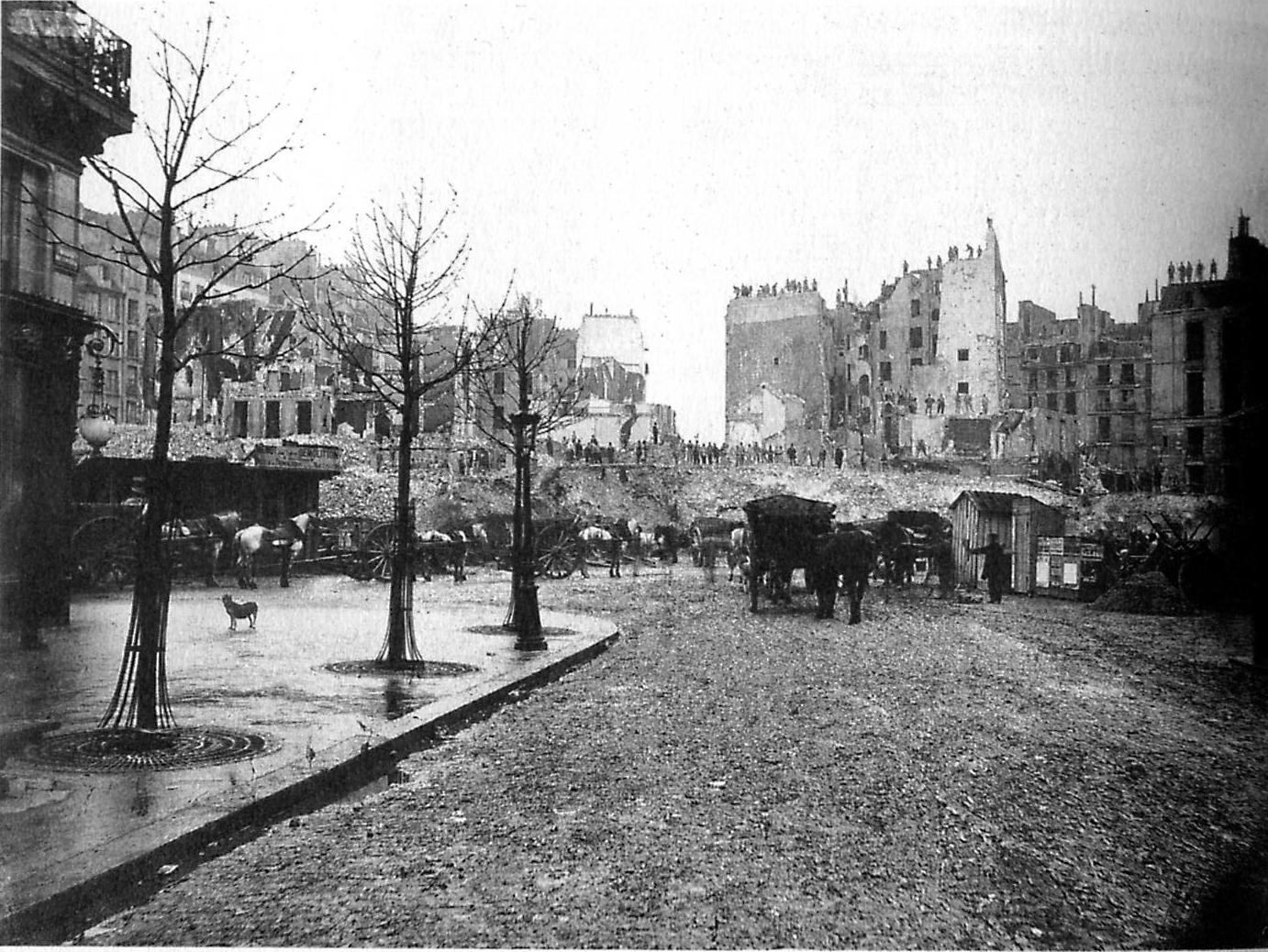
Drilling of Avenue de l'Opera, 1877

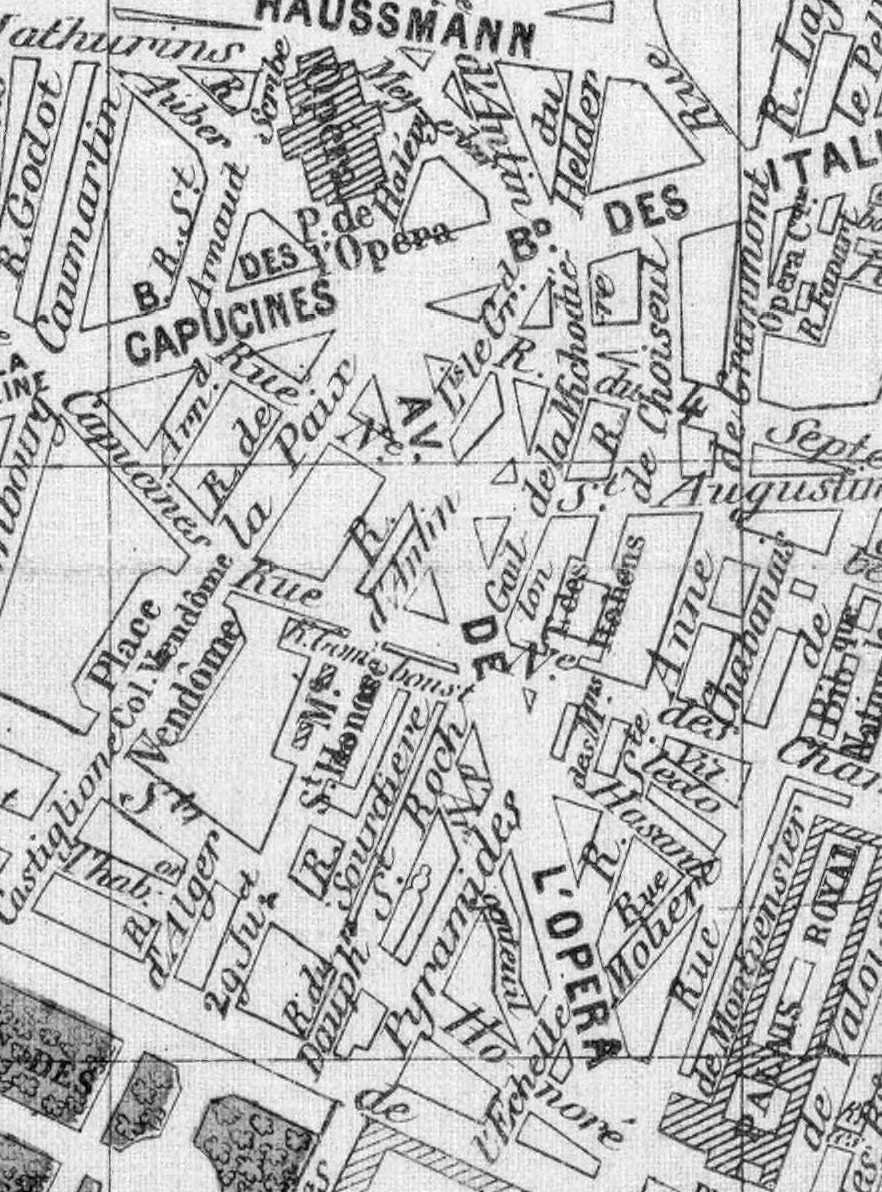
1877 map, when nearly completed

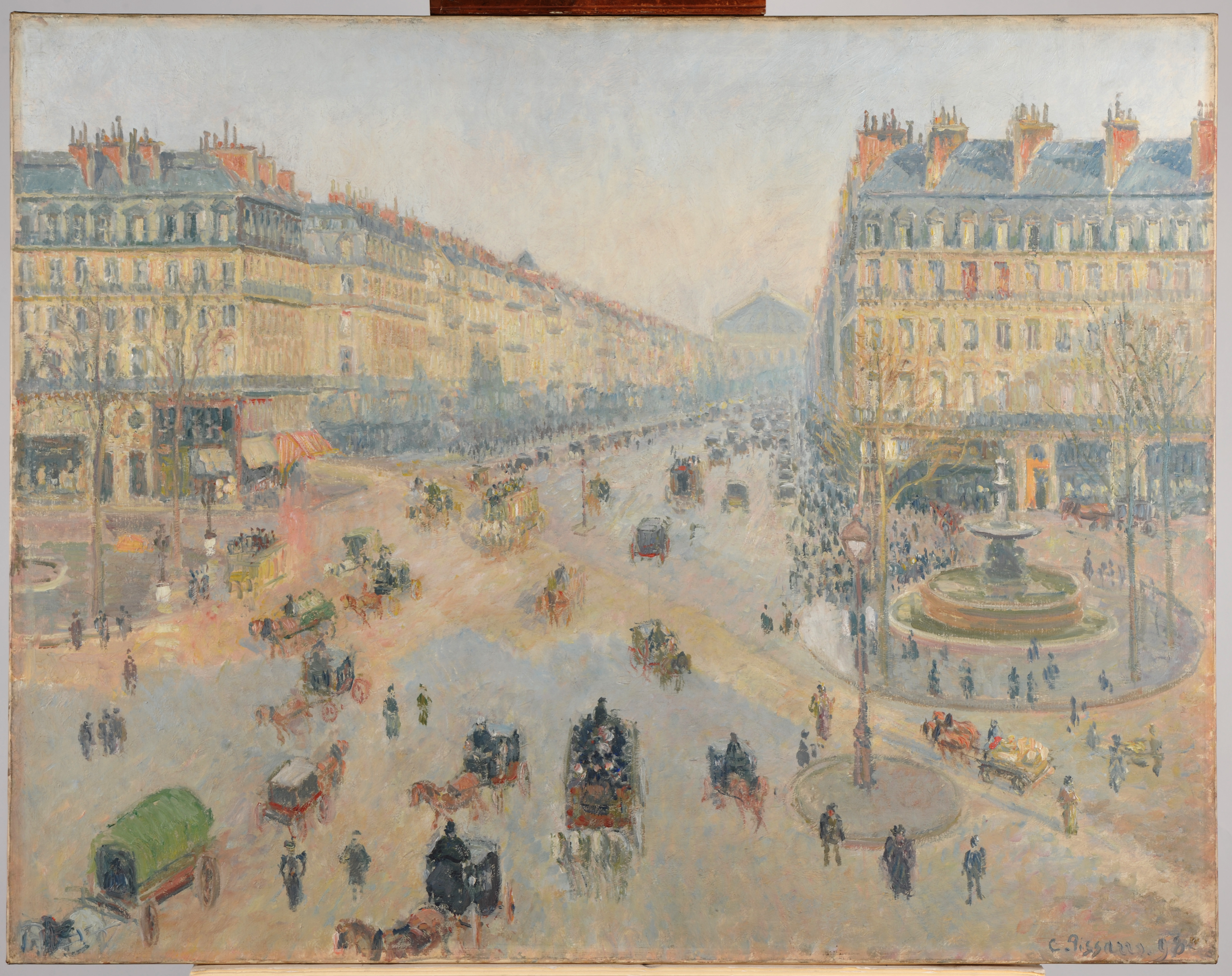
Avenue de l'Opéra by Camille Pissarro from the Hotel du Louvre, 1898

== Metro stations ==
Located near the Metro stations: Palais Royal - Musée du Louvre, Pyramides and Opéra.

== Literary connection ==
The Avenue de l'Opéra was featured in Louis Aragon's surrealist novel Le Paysan de Paris (The Parisian Peasant).
