= Jacques Amalric =

French journalist (1938–2021)

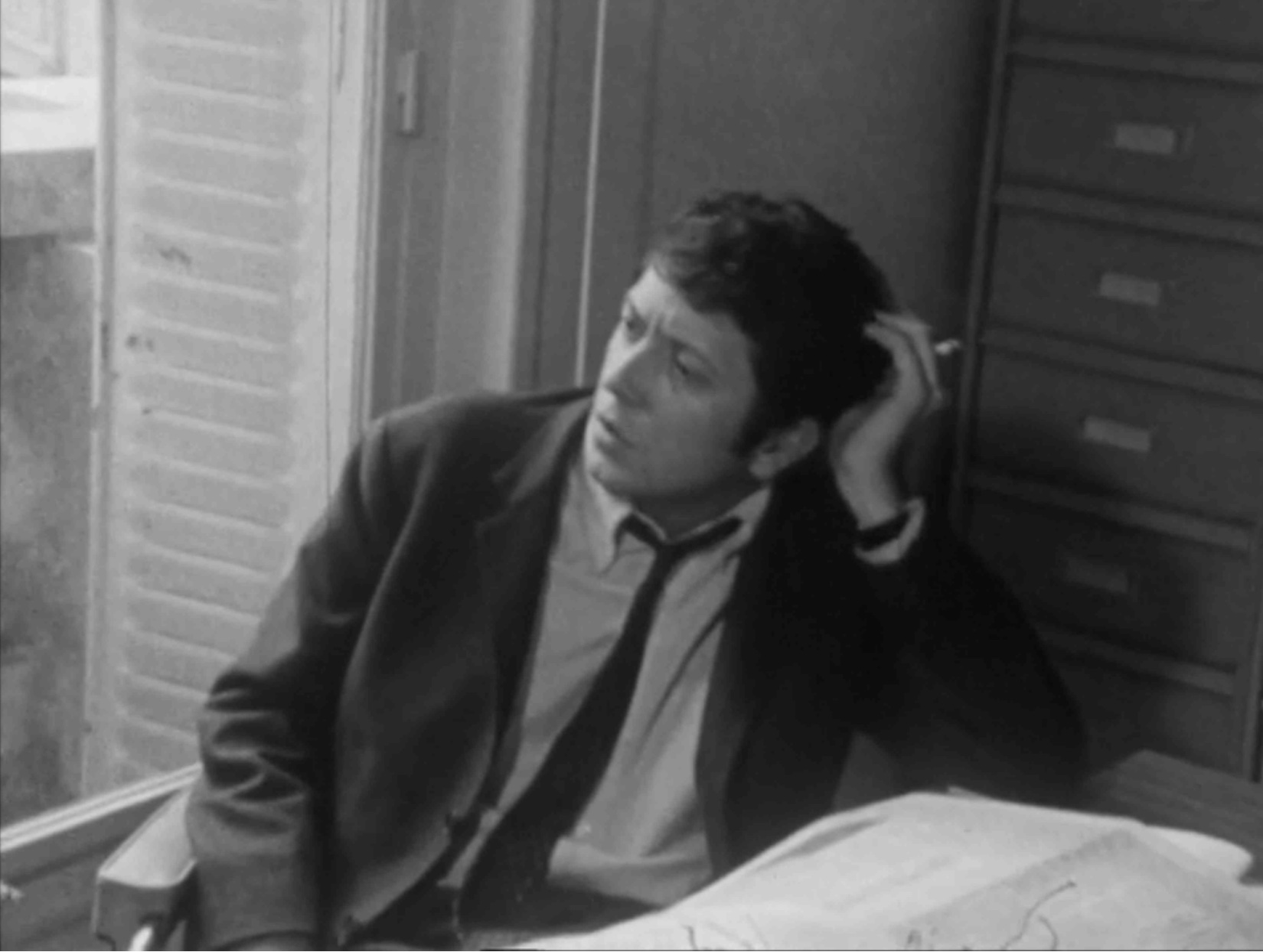
- Jacques Amalric, journalist, at Le Monde newspaper in 1967.
- Born: 6 October 1938; Montauban, France
- Died: 4 June 2021 (aged 82); Ajaccio, France

Jacques Amalric (6 October 1938 – 4 June 2021) was a French journalist. He was the editor-in-chief of Le Monde. His son is actor Mathieu Amalric.

== Biography ==
After studying political economy and partially performing a military service in Algeria, Jacques entered journalism at La Dépêche du Midi. In 1963, recruited by Hubert Beuve-Méry, he entered the newspaper Le Monde as a journalist in the foreign service and was correspondent for the daily in Washington (1970-1973), where he covered in particular Watergate, then in Moscow (1973-1977), where, opposed to Brejnev's policy, he attracts the wrath of the KGB.

In 1980, he was a candidate for the succession of Jacques Fauvet at the head of the daily in the first election of a director by journalists – a world first in the press of the press, – finally won by Claude Julien. In 1994, he joined the newspaper Liberation – of which he was the editorial director from 2000 to 2002 succeeding Frédéric Filloux – where he wrote until 2006. Finally, withdrawn in Corsica where he settled with his second wife, Isaline de Commarmond, he then supported the information site on rue89 by becoming a minority shareholder and holds a chronicle for economic alternatives.

Finally, having retired to Corsica where he settled with his second wife, Isaline de Comarmond, he then supported the news website Rue89 by becoming a minority shareholder and wrote a column for Alternatives économiques.
