= Ranjit Bolt =

British playwright and translator

Ranjit Bolt OBE (born 1959) is a British playwright and translator. He was born in Manchester of Anglo-Indian parents and is the nephew of playwright and screenwriter Robert Bolt. His father is literary critic Sydney Bolt, author of several books including A preface to James Joyce, and his mother has worked as a teacher of English.

== Life and career ==
Bolt was educated at The Perse School and Balliol College, Oxford. He worked as a stockbroker for eight years but "was desperate to escape, any escape route would have done, and translating turned out to be the one". As well as his plays, he has published a novel in verse, Losing it and a verse translation for children of the fables of La Fontaine, The Hare and the Tortoise. His version of Cyrano de Bergerac opened on New York at the Roundabout Theatre in September 2012, with Douglas Hodge in the title role. His adaptation of Volpone for Sir Trevor Nunn, was produced by the Royal Shakespeare Company in the summer of 2015.

He was awarded the OBE in 2003 for services to literature.

=== Translation of Molière's Le Tartuffe ===
Ranjit Bolt's 1991 translation of Molière’s 1664 masterpiece Tartuffe into English rhyming couplets, revised for a British stage production in 2002, is noted for its bold, colloquial, and humorous approach. Bolt’s version adopts a modern, shorter comic meter—typically four beats per line—while freely expanding or contracting the original’s structure to emphasize wit and accessibility. Unlike literal translations, Bolt prioritizes comedic effect and contemporary resonance over strict fidelity to Molière’s line count or phrasing.

The 2002 revision notably abbreviates some of Cléante’s speeches (though the full texts are included in an appendix), a choice that has drawn mixed reactions.

Critics have debated whether Bolt’s approach “dumbs down” Molière's work or revitalizes its satirical edge for modern audiences. While some argue that the translation reflects Bolt's voice as much as Molière's, others praise its irreverent energy and theatrical vitality. The result is a version of Tartuffe that, while not universally accepted as faithful to the original, is celebrated for its humor, verve, and appeal to contemporary audiences.

=== Views ===
Asked about his approach to translating plays, he has said:

I try to follow the rule laid down by perhaps the greatest translator of all, John Dryden, who maintained that a translator should – and I paraphrase – make the version as entertaining as possible, while at the same time remaining as faithful as possible to the spirit of the original.

In August 2014, Bolt was one of 200 public figures who were signatories to a letter to The Guardian opposing Scottish independence in the run-up to September's referendum on that issue.

== Publications ==
Bolt has translated many classic plays into English, most of them into verse. Among his works are:

- L'Invitation au Chateau (aka, Invitation to the Castle and Ring Round the Moon) by Jean Anouilh
- Three Sisters from the play by Anton Chekhov
- The Bacchae by the play by Euripides
- The Liar (1989) from Le Menteur by Pierre Corneille
- The Illusion (1990) from L'Illusion Comique by Pierre Corneille
- The Real Don Juan (1990) from Don Juan Tenorio by José Zorrilla y Moral
- Tartuffe (1991 and 2002) from the play by Molière
- Lysistrata (1993) from the play by Aristophanes
- The Venetian Twins (1993) from the play by Carlo Goldoni
- Le Cid (1994) from the play by Pierre Corneille
- The Miser (1995) from L'Avare by Molière
- The Oedipus Plays (1996)
- The Art of Seduction (1997) from La Double Inconstance by Pierre Marivaux
- Cyrano de Bergerac (1995) from the play by Edmond Rostand
- The Resistible Rise of Arturo Ui (2005) from the play by Bertolt Brecht
- The Marriage of Figaro (2006) from the play by Pierre Beaumarchais
- Merry Wives - The Musical (2006) from The Merry Wives of Windsor by William Shakespeare
- Mirandolina (2006) from The Mistress of the Inn the play by Carlo Goldoni
- The Grouch (2008) from Le Misanthrope by Molière
- Waltz of the Toreadors from the play by Jean Anouilh
- Believe it or not from Le Puff by Eugène Scribe
- George Dandin from the play by Molière
- Hercules from the work by Seneca
- The Idiot from L'Étourdi by Molière
- Scapin from Les Fourberies de Scapin by Molière
- The School for Wives from the play by Molière
- The Sisterhood from Les Femmes Savantes by Molière
- A Flea In Her Ear from the play by Georges Feydeau
- "Much Ado About Nothing" by William Shakespeare, adapted and translated in a modern version by Bolt
- "Three Men In A Boat" Adaptation by Ranjit Bolt, book and lyrics for a musical. (Based on Three Men In A Boat by Jerome K Jerome)
- Bolt, Ranjit (2001). Losing it: an adult fairytale for those who're tired of fairytales in prose. John Murray. ISBN 071956025X.
- Bolt, Ranjit (2006). The hare and the Tortoise and other fables of La Fontaine. Giselle Potter (illustrator). Barefoot Books. ISBN 1905236530.
- A Knight with a Big Blue Balloon. Collection of jokes and wordplay. Published by Gibson Square.
- A Lion Was Learning To Ski. Limericks. Published by Gibson Square.
- The Art Of Translation. Published by Oberon Books, 2010.

== Performances of his work ==
In 2014 he wrote an English version of the text for Mozart's comic opera, The Impresario, which was given by The Santa Fe Opera in Santa Fe, New Mexico in a double bill paired with Igor Stravinsky's The Nightingale. In 2017, his Tartuffe was performed at Stratford Festival in Stratford, Ontario.
