= Rue des Pyramides =

Rue des Pyramides is a 217m long street in the 1st arrondissement of Paris, linking Place des Pyramides and Avenue de l'Opéra. It is named after Napoleon Bonaparte's 1798 Battle of the Pyramids.

Its central section as far as rue Saint-Honoré is flanked by arcaded blocks of flats, identical to those on Place des Pyramides.

It is served by Pyramides station on lines 7 and 14 on the Metro.

== History ==
The 1730 Roussel map shows a passage on part of the site now occupied by Rue des Pyramides.

On 9 October 1801 the consuls decreed:

3rd Article - The buildings of the Pavilion de Médicis, the stables known as de Monsigneur and the pages' houses, shall be sold to be demolished. A square will be made facing the entrance to the garden and a street which will lead to that of Saint-Honoré. The lands surrounding this square and bordering the street will be sold, with instructions to build to the plans and façades given by the government architect.

In 1801 it was joined on its south side (as far as rue Saint-Honoré), on the site of the former Hôtel des Grandes-Écuries du Roi and its associated buildings, shown on the 1714 La Caille map and the 1730 Roussel map.

During the Trois Glorieuses in 1830 the street saw a confrontation between the insurgents and the army. From 1835 onwards the painter and lithographer Jean-Jacques Champin (1796–1860) lived at number 2 on the street. The street was extended as far as avenue de l'Opéra in 1877. During the Second World War the French Popular Party was based at number 10 on the street.

== Gallery ==
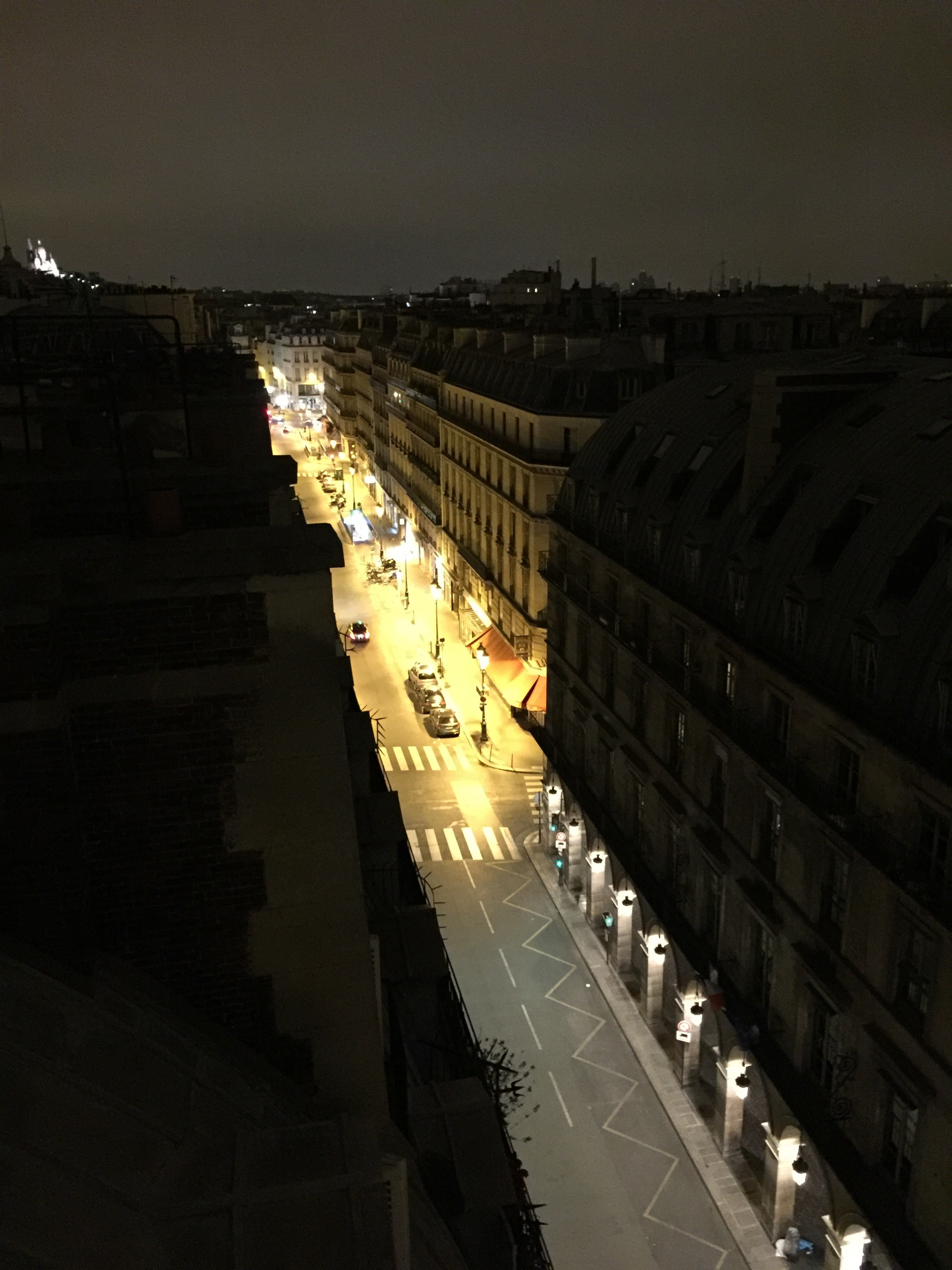
La rue des Pyramides.

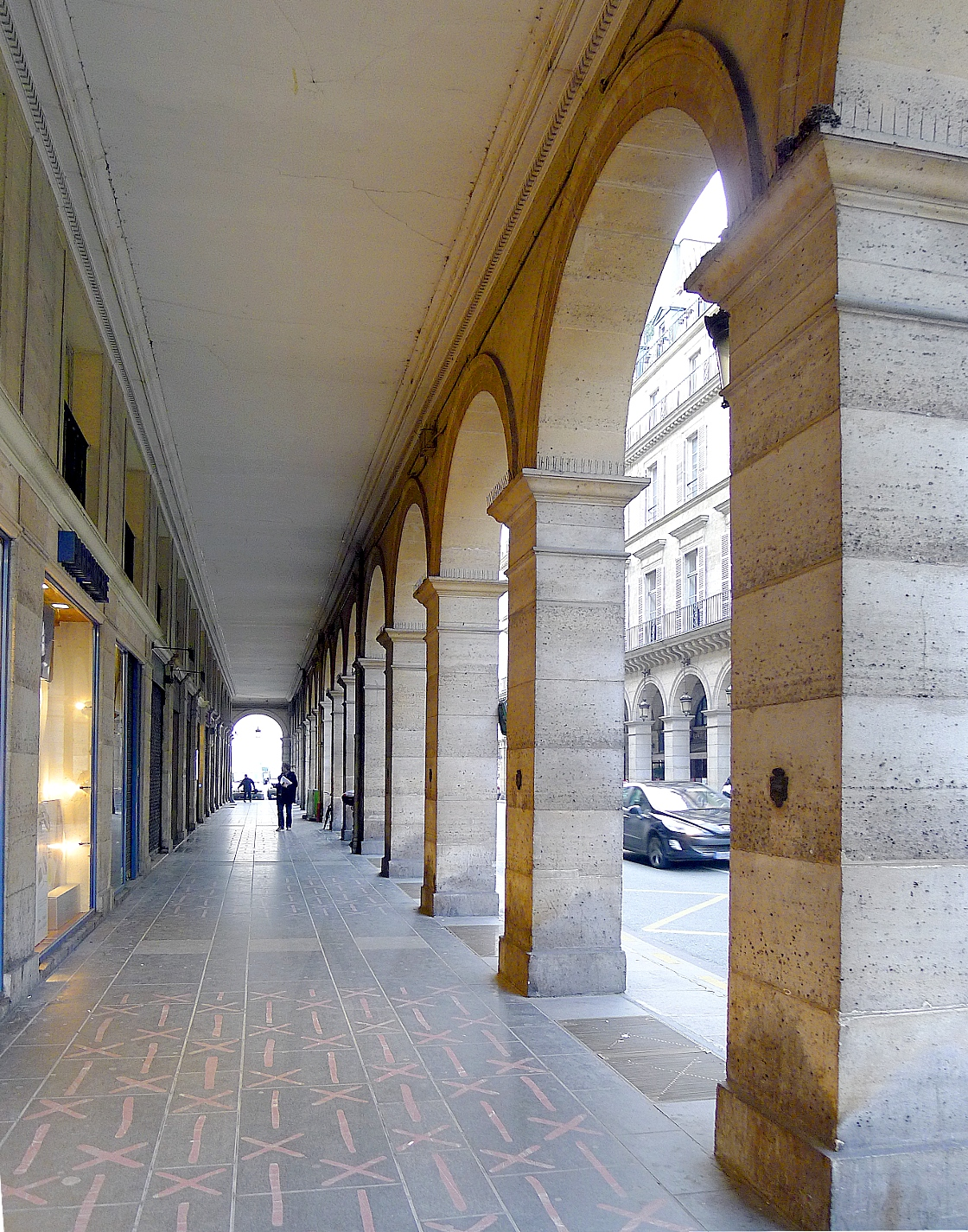
Arcades on Rue des Pyramides.
