= Hôtel du Louvre =

Hotel in Paris, France

Coordinates: 48°51′46″N 2°20′09″E

Grand Hôtel du Louvre
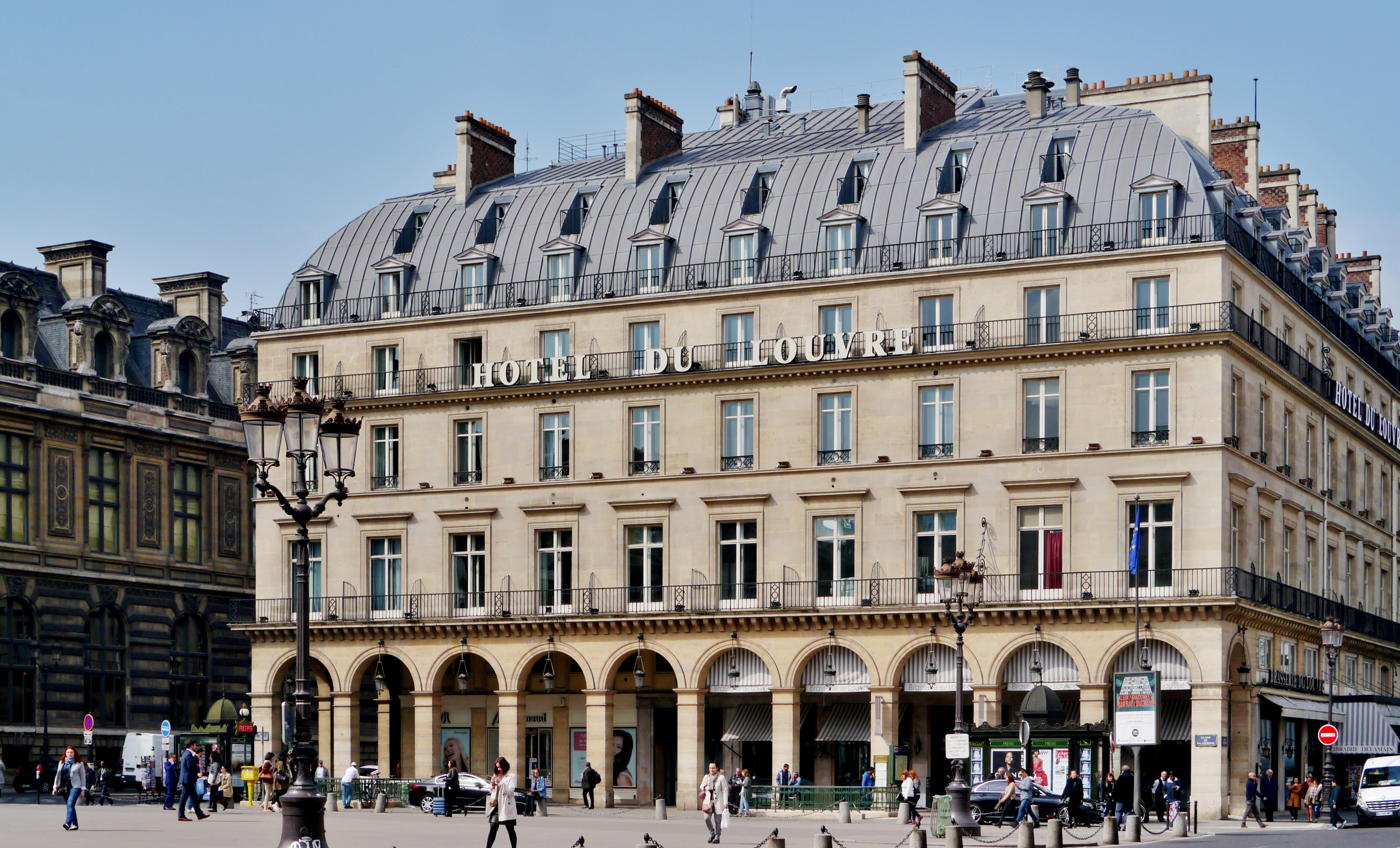

General information
- Location: 1st arrondissement of Paris, France
- Inaugurated: 1855; 171 years ago

Other information
- Number of rooms: 164

Website
- hyatt.com

The Grand Hôtel du Louvre (French pronunciation: [otɛl dy luvʁ]) is a Parisian luxury hotel in Haussmann architecture style, with a 5-star rating. It is located across the Louvre, on Place André-Malraux in the 1st arrondissement. It is part of The Unbound Collection by Hyatt, a global brand of luxury independent hotels featuring historic landmarks.

== Location ==
The hotel occupies the block between the Rue de Rivoli (facing the Louvre Palace), Rue de Rohan, Rue Saint-Honoré (opposite the Comédie-Française), and Place du Palais-Royal (opposite the Louvre des Antiquaires). It is situated in line with the Avenue de l'Opéra.

== History ==
=== The Grand Hôtel du Louvre (1855) ===
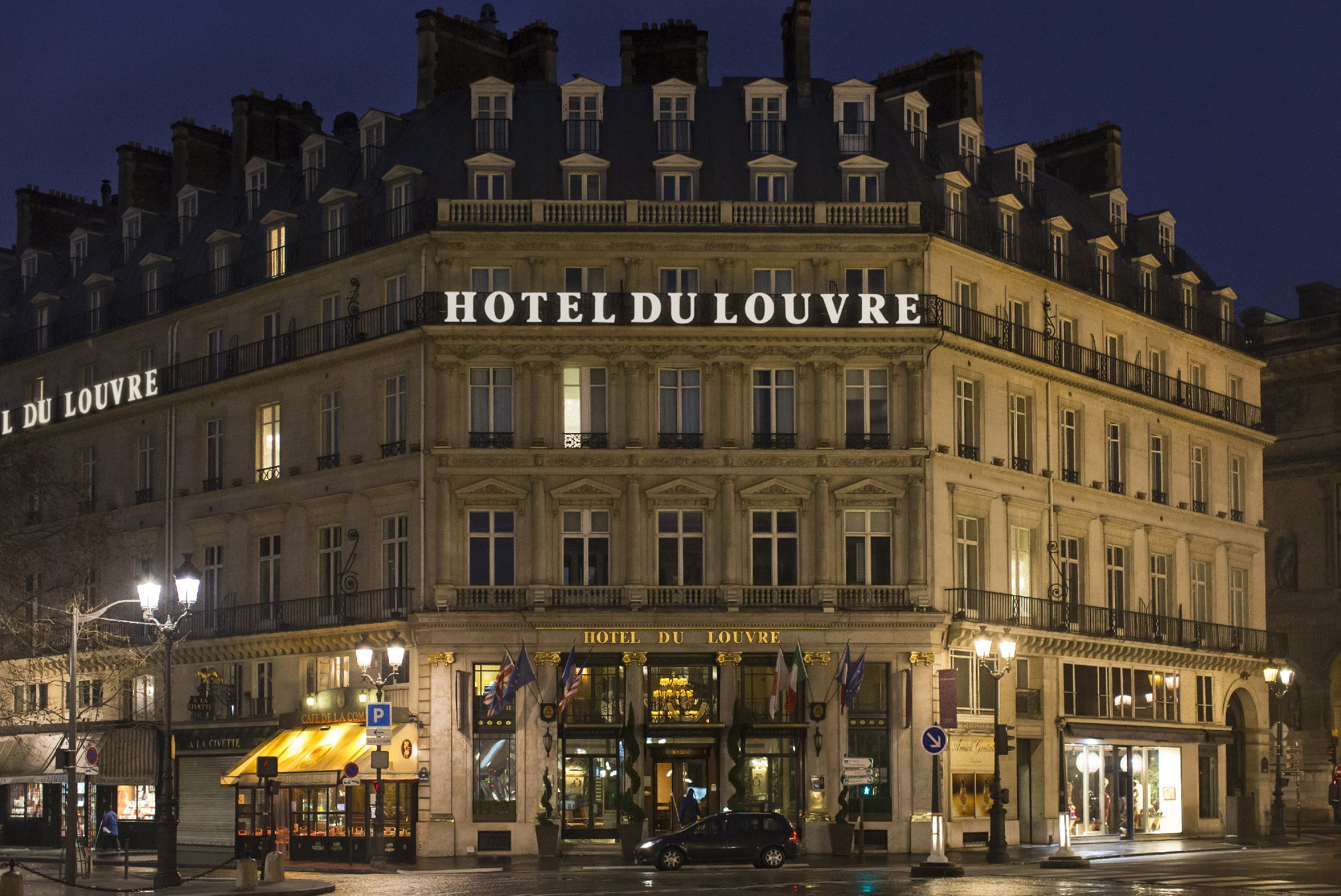
The hotel, on Place André-Malraux

The Grand Hôtel du Louvre was commissioned by Emperor Napoleon III in 1855. Under the direction of Prefect Haussmann, the city underwent significant transformation. The dark and unsanitary alleys surrounding the Louvre were replaced with broad avenues. With the opening of Rue de Rivoli, Napoleon III initiated projects for the new opera house and the avenue that would serve it. France was undergoing industrial development and increasing its influence. Plans were underway for the 1855 and 1867 Universal Expositions. As a result, "Grand Hotels" were constructed, with the "Grand Hôtel du Louvre" being the first, as requested by Napoleon III. Initially, the hotel was built to the east of its current location, on the site of the Louvre des Antiquaires.

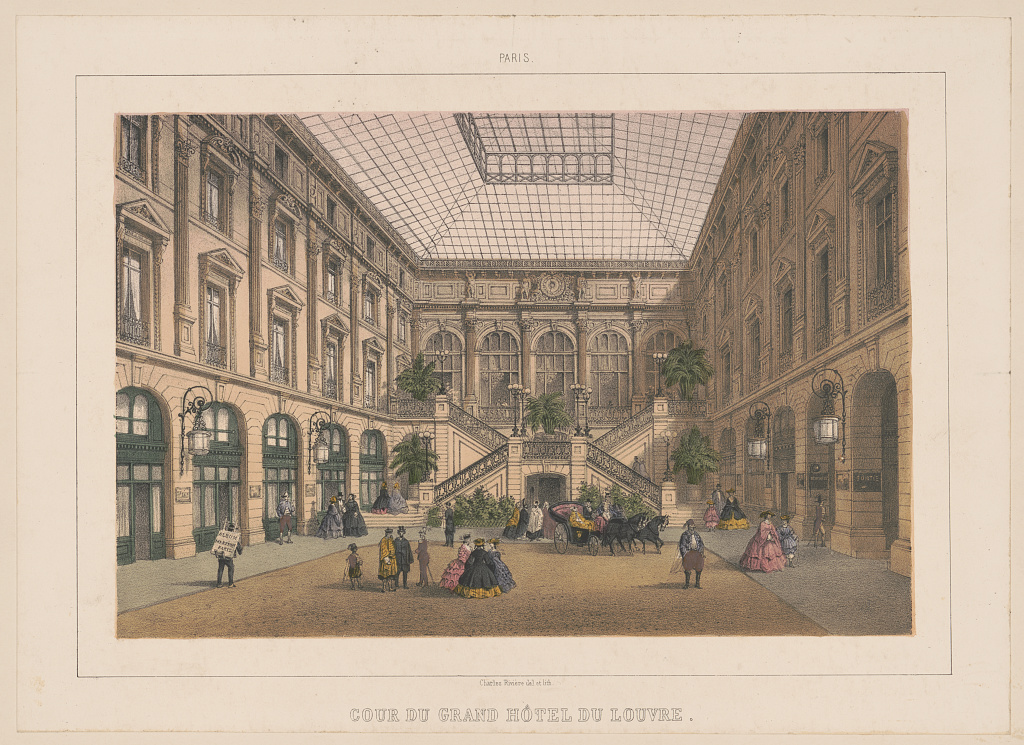
The courtyard of the Grand Hôtel du Louvre in the 1870s

With approximately 700 modern comfort rooms, elevators, and grand staircases, the "Grand Hôtel du Louvre" was one of the most modern of its time. It had 1,250 employees who worked there daily, offering various services for travelers for the first time, such as omnibus connections between the hotel and train stations, guides, interpreters, information desk, and currency exchange. Its restaurant also gained international renown for being the first to offer the most famous dishes from various foreign countries.

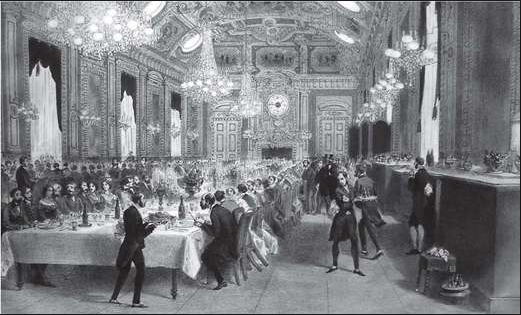
The Table d'hôte, the main restaurant of the Grand Hôtel du Louvre around 1870

By 1855, 41 luxury boutiques occupied the ground floor of the Grand Hôtel du Louvre. Constantly expanding, the commercial spaces gradually took over the entire hotel. Eventually, in the late 1880s, the hotel gave way to the Grands Magasins du Louvre, as advertised with the slogan "The entire Hôtel du Louvre converted into a store".

=== The Grand Hôtel du Louvre (since 1887) ===
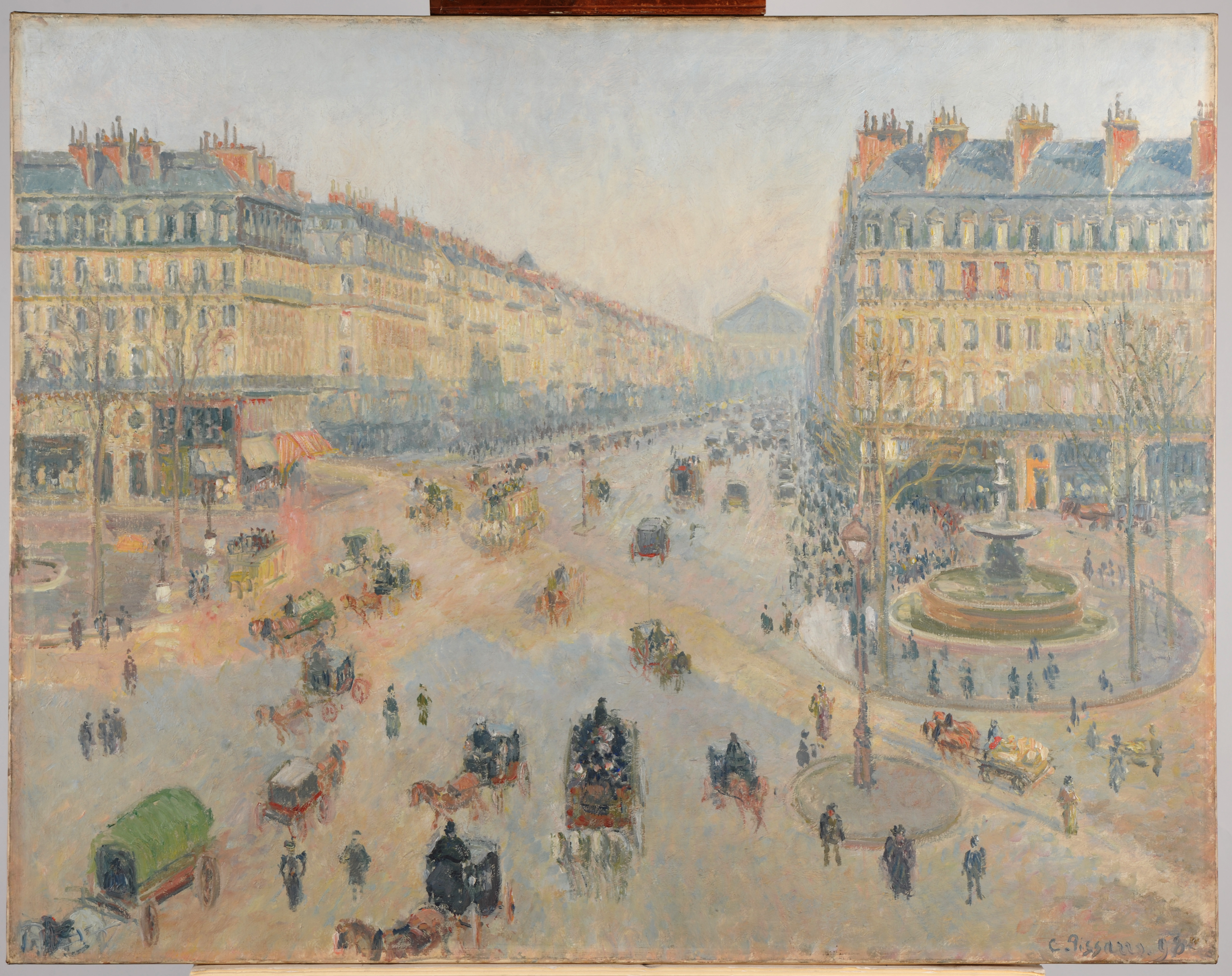
Camille Pissarro, Avenue de l'Opéra, Sun, Winter Morning, 1898

In 1887, the hotel was relocated to the other side of Place du Palais-Royal—where it stands today—to make room for the Grands Magasins du Louvre. The impressionist painter Camille Pissarro painted several paintings there in 1897 and 1898, some from the windows of the suite he occupied, which now bears his name.

The psychoanalyst Sigmund Freud stayed at the hotel in 1910 and wroteUn Souvenir d'Enfance de Léonard de Vinci there. The hotel also inspired Arthur Conan Doyle, who featured a character staying there in a Sherlock Holmes adventure. In the lobby, a plaque installed by the Sherlock Holmes Society of France commemorates this connection.

During World War II, the Hôtel du Louvre served as the headquarters for an SS Sonderkommando.

In 2001, the hotel was redecorated by the architect Sybille de Margerie.

In June 2012, it was reported that the hotel, owned by the Concorde Hotels & Resorts group, was sold, along with the Martinez, the Palais de la Méditerranée, and the Concorde La Fayette, to investors from Qatar. The completion of the sale was officially announced on February 1, 2013. The hotel is now owned by Constellation Hotels Holdings, a management company based in Luxembourg and controlled by Qatari capital. At the same time, the American hotel chain Hyatt was chosen as the operator.

The interior and façades on Rue Saint-Honoré and Rue de Rohan were renovated once again in 2018-2019.

The name changed from "Hôtel du Louvre" to "Grand Hôtel du Louvre" in 2026 to return to the original and historical name.

== Architecture ==
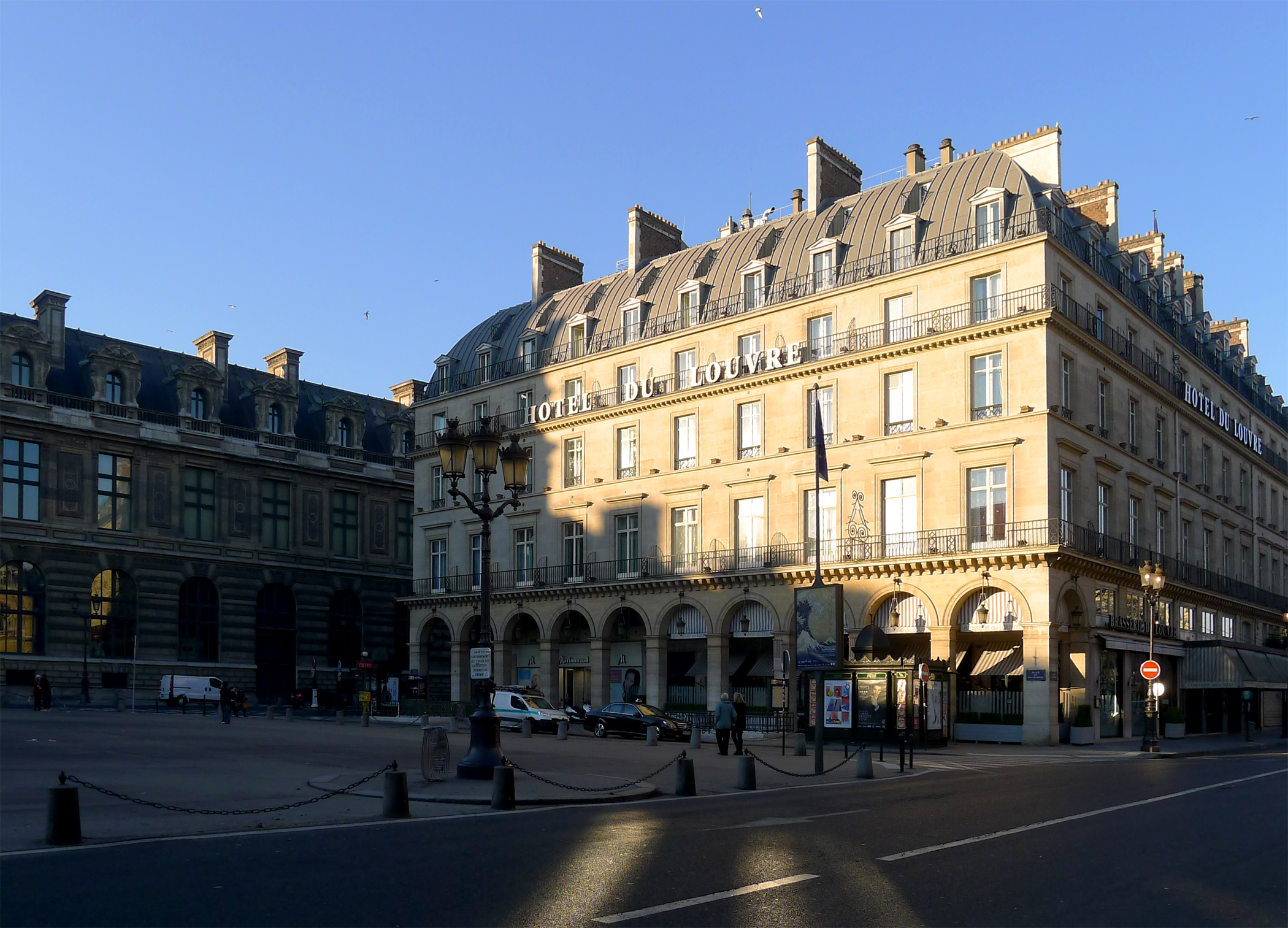
The facade of the hotel on Place du Palais-Royal

Built during the Second Empire by architects Alfred Armand, Charles Rohault de Fleury, and Auguste Pellechet, the Hôtel du Louvre features Haussmannian-style exterior architecture: marble, light woodwork, columns, grand chandeliers and staircase, high ceilings, light, and glass roof.

== Influences and uses ==
In the novel "Pot-Bouille", Émile Zola places the post-wedding evening meal at the Hôtel du Louvre. In Julien Duvivier's 1957 film adaptation of the book, starring Gérard Philipe, the reception was filmed in a set recreating the hotel, constructed in the Billancourt studios. Mathieu Amalric used the entire hotel as the setting for his adaptation of "L'Illusion comique" (2010).

== Bibliography ==
- Conan, Arthur. L'Aventure des plans du Bruce-Partington (in French).
