= Mathieu Amalric =

French actor and filmmaker (born 1965)

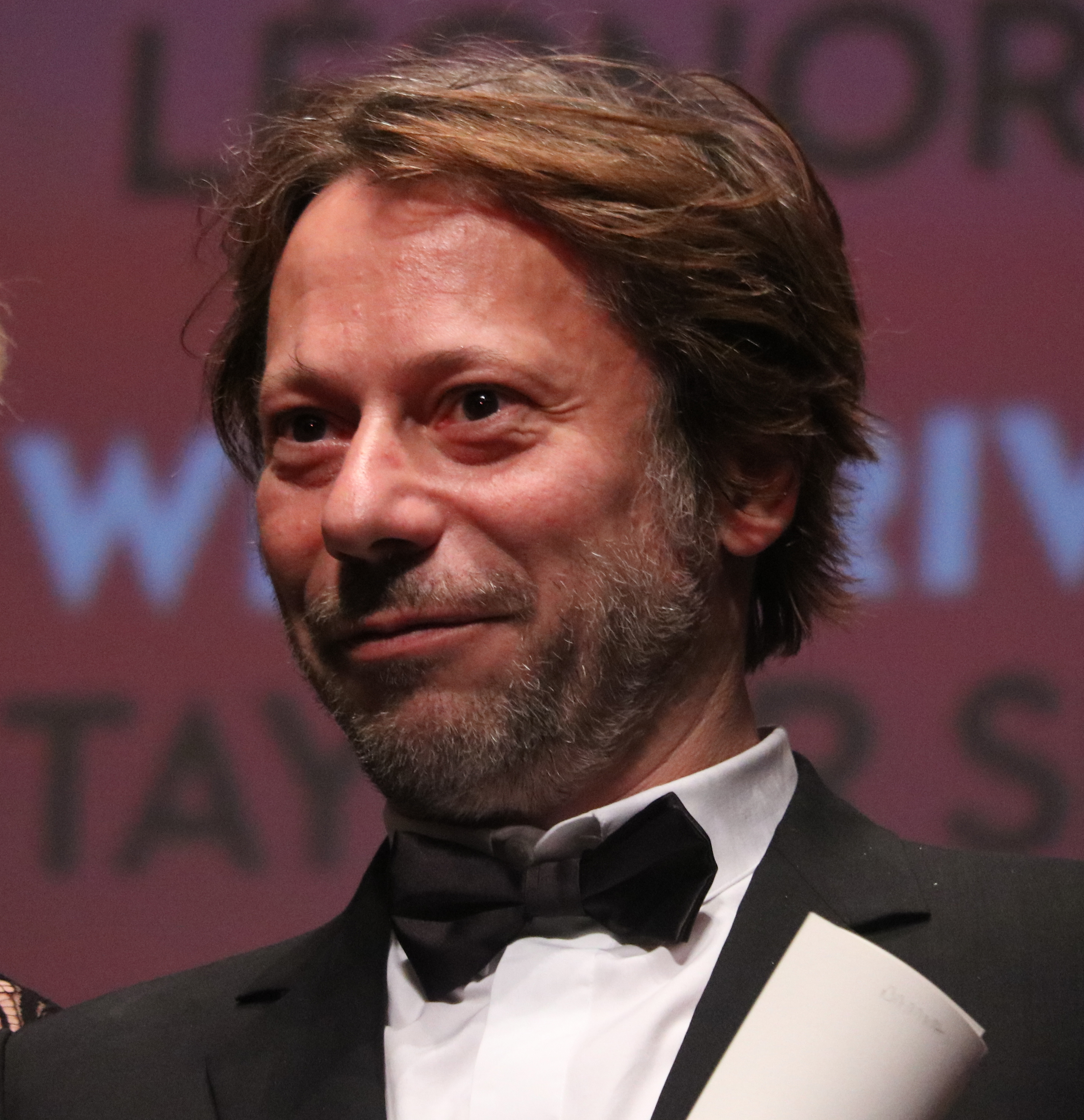
- Amalric in 2017
- Born: 25 October 1965 (age 60); Neuilly-sur-Seine, France
- Occupations: Actor; director; screenwriter; producer
- Years active: 1984–present
- Children: 3

Mathieu Amalric (French pronunciation: [matjø amalʁik]; born 25 October 1965) is a French actor and filmmaker. He has won several César Awards and the Lumière Awards.

He is best known internationally for his roles in the James Bond film Quantum of Solace, in which he played the lead villain; Steven Spielberg's Munich; Wes Anderson's The Grand Budapest Hotel and The French Dispatch; and for his lead performance in The Diving Bell and the Butterfly, for which he drew critical acclaim.

== Early life ==
Amalric was born on 25 October 1965 in Neuilly-sur-Seine, a suburb of Paris. He is the son of Jacques Amalric, a French native who worked as a foreign affairs editor for Le Monde and Libération, and Nicole Zand, a literary critic for Le Monde, who was born in Poland to Jewish parents and moved to France at the outbreak of World War II.

== Selected films ==
Amalric first gained fame in the film Ma Vie Sexuelle (My Sex Life...or How I Got Into an Argument), for which he won a César Award.

In 2007, he starred in the critically acclaimed movie The Diving Bell and the Butterfly, portraying Jean-Dominique Bauby, a journalist who learned to communicate through partner-assisted scanning after a stroke left him suffering from locked-in syndrome. Amalric's performance was universally acclaimed, and he won the Cesar Award for Best Actor.

He was selected to play the James Bond villain Dominic Greene alongside Daniel Craig (with whom he had previously starred in Munich) in the 2008 film Quantum of Solace.

His 2010 film, On Tour, premiered at the 2010 Cannes Film Festival and won Amalric the Best Director Award.

The 2014 film The Blue Room, which he directed and starred in, was selected to compete in the Un Certain Regard section at the 2014 Cannes Film Festival.

== Personal life ==
Amalric has three sons, two with French actress and singer Jeanne Balibar, and one with theater director and writer Stéphanie Cléau. From 2019 - 2024 he was in a relationship with Canadian soprano and conductor Barbara Hannigan.

He supports the Girondins de Bordeaux football club.

== Filmography ==
=== As actor ===
Year	Title	Role	Notes
1984	Favorites of the Moon	Julien	
1991	Vert quoi vers où		Short
1992	The Sentinel	A medical student	
1992	La Chasse aux papillons		
1993	Les Yeux au plafond		Short; also director and screenwriter
1994	Lettre pour L...		Also assistant director
1995	Tom est tout seul	Un copain de Tom	Uncredited; also assistant director
1996	Le Journal du séducteur	Sebastien	Nominated—Acteurs à l'Écran for Best Actor
1996	My Sex Life... or How I Got Into an Argument	Paul Dedalus	César Award for Most Promising Actor
1997	Genealogies of a Crime	Yves	
1998	L'Interview	Julien	Short
1998	On a très peu d'amis	Ivan	
1998	Dieu seul me voit (Versailles-Chantiers)	Atchoum	
1998	Late August, Early September	Gabriel	
1998	Alice and Martin	Benjamin Sauvagnac	
1999	Trois ponts sur la rivière	Arthur Echéant	
1999	Farewell, Home Sweet Home	Drinker at bar	
2000	False Servant	Lélio	
2000	La Bréche de Roland	Roland	
2000	L'Affaire Marcorelle	Fourcade	
2001	Boyhood Loves	Paul	
2001	Zaïde, un petit air de vengeance	Luigi Scarofolo	Telefilm
2002	Lundi matin	Nicolas	Voice
2002	Les Naufragés de la D17	René	
2002	Lulu	The advocate	
2002	C'est le bouquet!	Stéphane	
2003	A Man, a Real One	Boris	
2003	Mes enfants ne sont pas comme les autres	Gérald	
2003	Inquiétudes	Art teacher	
2004	Cuadrilátero	C	Short
2004	Les Parallèles	Simon	Short
2004	Kings and Queen	Ismaël Vuillard	César Award for Best Actor; Lumière Award for Best Actor
2004	Le Pont des Arts	Un spectateur du Nô	
2004	Au large de Bad Ragaz	Alex	
2005	I Saw Ben Barka Get Killed	Philippe Bernier	
2005	Les Matines	Serge	Short
2005	The Moustache	Serge Schaeffer	
2005	Munich	Louis	Nominated—National Society of Film Critics Award for Best Supporting Actor (2nd place); Nominated—New York Film Critics Circle Award for Best Supporting Actor (2nd place)
2005	Comme James Dean	Robert Benchetrout	Short
2005	Avaler des couleuvres	Tom	Short
2006	Marie Antoinette	Man at Masked Ball	
2006	When I Was a Singer	Bruno	
2006	Les Signes	Man	Short
2006	Fragments sur la grâce	A reader	
2006	Un lever de rideau	Pierre	Short
2006	Le Grand Appartement	Martin	
2007	Michou d'Auber	Jacques	
2007	Heartbeat Detector	Simon	Copenhagen International Film Festival - Best Actor; Gijón International Film Festival - Best Actor; Nominated—Globes de Cristal Award for Best Actor
2007	Actrices	Denis	
2007	The Diving Bell and the Butterfly	Jean-Dominique Bauby	César Award for Best Actor; Étoiles d'Or for Best Best Actor; Lumière Award for Best Actor; Nominated—Detroit Film Critics Society Award for Best Actor; Nominated—Globes de Cristal Award for Best Actor
2007	L'Histoire de Richard O.	Richard O.	
2007	A Secret	François Grimbert à 37 ans	
2008	57000 km entre nous	Simon	
2008	A Christmas Tale	Henri	
2008	On War	Bertrand	
2008	Mesrine: Public Enemy Number One	François Besse	Nominated—Globes de Cristal Award for Best Actor
2008	Quantum of Solace	Dominic Greene	
2009	Park Benches	The father in pram	
2009	Face	Man in bushes	
2009	Happy End	Robinson	
2009	Wild Grass	Bernard de Bordeaux	
2010	The Extraordinary Adventures of Adèle Blanc-Sec	Dieuleveult	
2010	On Tour	Joachim Zand	Also director and screenwriter RiverRun International Film Festival - Best Actor
2010	The Rabbi's Cat	Le prince	Voice
2010	The Silence of Joan	The Preacher	
2010	La Chanson du dimanche	Danny Monaco	TV series
2011	Chicken with Plums	Nasser-Ali	
2012	You Ain't Seen Nothin' Yet!	Himself	
2012	Cosmopolis	André Petrescu	
2012	Camille Rewinds	French teacher	
2012	Le Reste du monde	Paul	Telefilm
2012	Les Gouffres	Georges	
2012	Lines of Wellington	Barão Marbot	
2013	Venus in Fur	Thomas	Nominated—César Award for Best Actor
2013	Jimmy P: Psychotherapy of a Plains Indian	George Devereux	
2013	Love Is the Perfect Crime	Marc	
2013	Les Anonymes	Roger Marion	Telefilm
2013	The Dune	Moreau	
2013	Petit matin	Patrick	Short
2014	The Grand Budapest Hotel	Serge X	Florida Film Critics Circle Award for Best Cast; Nominated—Critics' Choice Movie Award for Best Acting Ensemble; Nominated—San Diego Film Critics Society Award for Best Performance by an Ensemble; Nominated—Screen Actors Guild Award for Outstanding Performance by a Cast in a Motion Picture; Nominated—Washington D.C. Area Film Critics Association Award for Best Ensemble
2014	If You Don't, I Will	Pierre	
2014	The Blue Room	Julien Gahyde	Also director and screenwriter
2014	Bird People	The narrator	Voice
2014	Les Jours venus	Participant scène de l'enterrement	
2015	Wolf Hall	Eustace Chapuys	TV miniseries
2015	The Forbidden Room	Thadeusz M____ / Ostler	
2015	My Golden Days	Paul (adult)	
2015	Families	Jérôme Varenne	
2015	The Very Private Life of Mister Sim	Samuel	
2015	Winter Song	Bâtisseur	
2015	D'ombres et d'ailes		Short; voice
2015	Spectrographies	The filmmaker	
2015	Hitchcock/Truffaut	Narrator	
2016	Le Cancre	Boris	
2016	Spiritismes		
2016	Le Fils de Joseph	Oscar Pormenor	
2016	La Loi de la jungle	Galgaric	
2016	Daguerrotype	Vincent	
2016	Never Ever	Rey	
2016	Demain et tous les autres jours	Le père	
2017	Espèces menacées		
2017	Barbara	Yves Zand	Also director and screenwriter
2017	Ismael's Ghosts	Ismaël Vuillard	
2018	Sink or Swim	Bertrand	
2018	At Eternity's Gate	Dr. Paul Gachet	
2018–2020	The Bureau	JJA	TV series
2019	Sound of Metal	Richard Berger	
2019	An Officer and a Spy	Alphonse Bertillon	
2021	The French Dispatch	The Commissaire	
2021	Mother Schmuckers	The father	
2021	Oxygen	M.I.L.O.	
2021	Tralala	Tralala/Pat Rivière	
2023	A Prince (Un prince)	Narrator	
2023	A Difficult Year (Une année difficile)	Henri	
2023	Mars Express	Chris Royjacker	Voice
2024	Serpent's Path	Laval	
2025	The Phoenician Scheme	Marseille Bob	
2025	Vie privée	Simon Cohen-Solal	
2025	Nino	Man at public baths	

=== As filmmaker ===
Year	Title	Credited as			Notes
Year	Title	Director	Screenwriter	Other	Notes
1985	Marre de café	Yes	Yes		Short
1986	La Seule différence c'est que les cafés sont plus chers	Yes			Short
1987	Au revoir les enfants			Yes	Third assistant director
1990	La Passion Van Gogh			Yes	Assistant director and assistant editor
1990	Sans rires	Yes	Yes		Short
1992	Border Line			Yes	Second assistant director
1992	The Absence			Yes	Assistant director
1993	Les Yeux au plafond	Yes	Yes		Short
1993	8 bis	Yes	Yes		Short
1993	The Diary of Lady M			Yes	Assistant director
1993	Lettre pour L...			Yes	Assistant director
1994	Bête de scène			Yes	Short; assistant director
1995	Tom est tout seul			Yes	Assistant director
1997	Mange ta soupe	Yes	Yes		
2001	The Wimbledon Stadium	Yes	Yes		
2003	La Chose publique	Yes	Yes		Telefilm
2003	Malus	Yes	Yes		Documentary short
2004	14,58 euros	Yes	Yes		Short
2007	Deux cages sans oiseaux	Yes	Yes		Short
2007	À l'instar du Père Noël et de la pizza	Yes	Yes		Short
2007	Laissez-les grandir ici	Yes			Documentary short
2010	On Tour	Yes	Yes		Cannes Film Festival - Best Director; Cannes Film Festival - FIPRESCI Prize; Nominated—César Award for Best Director; Nominated—César Award for Best Original Screenplay; Nominated—Globes de Cristal Award for Best Film; Nominated—Gopo Award for Best European Film; Nominated—Lumière Award for Best Director
2010	Joann Sfar (dessins)	Yes		Yes	Documentary short; also cinematographer
2010	The Screen Illusion	Yes	Yes		Telefilm
2012	Next to Last (automne 63)	Yes	Yes		Short
2012	La Richesse du loup			Yes	Co-producer
2014	La Magie de Noël	Yes			Short
2014	The Blue Room	Yes	Yes		Mar del Plata Film Festival - Best Director; Nominated—Cannes Film Festival - Prix Un certain regard Nominated—César Award for Best Adaptation
2015	C'est presque au bout du monde	Yes			Short
2017	Barbara	Yes	Yes		Prix Louis-Delluc 2017
2021	Hold Me Tight	Yes	Yes		
