= After the War =

After the War may refer to:

- After the War, a 1989 British TV miniseries written by Frederic Raphael based on his novel
- After the War (film), a 2017 French film
- After the War (Gary Moore album), 1989
- After the War (novel), a 1997 novel by Carol Matas
- After the War (video game), a 1989 video game
- After the War (Mono Inc. album)
- After the war (song), a World War I song
