= Jean-Louis Livi =

French film producer

- Born: 29 January 1941 (age 85); Marseille, France
- Occupation: Film producer
- Years active: 1988–present
- Spouse: Caroline Silhol
- Relatives: Yves Montand (uncle)

Jean-Louis Livi (born 29 January 1941) is a French film producer and agent.

Livi was nominated for an Academy Award and two BAFTA Film Awards for producing The Father (2020).

== Early life ==
Jean-Louis Livi is the son of Giuliano/Julien Livi (1917–1994), the older brother of Italian-French actor Yves Montand.

== Career ==
Starting in 1970, Livi worked at Artmedia, France's main casting agency, first as an accountant then as an agent. He notably helped launch the career of Gérard Depardieu, becoming his agent in 1971. Livi later headed Artmedia between 1982 and 1990. Between 1990 and 2006, Livi was director of the production companies Film par film and SEDIF (Société d'exploitation et de distribution de films) Productions. Since 2006, he has been the director the production company F comme film. Livi also manages the company Solivagus Productions.

Livi and Bernard Murat have been co-directors of the Théâtre des Mathurins and of the Théâtre Édouard VII in Paris.

In 2021, Livi became a member of the Academy of Motion Picture Arts and Sciences.

== Personal life ==
Livi has been married twice. His first marriage was to Tanya Lopert. He is married to actress Caroline Silhol with whom he has a son named Victor.

== Selected filmography ==
Year	Title		Director	Notes
1988	The Little Thief		Claude Miller	
1991	On peut toujours rêver		Pierre Richard	
1991	Merci la vie		Bertrand Blier	
1991	My Father the Hero		Gérard Lauzier	
1991	Tous les matins du monde		Alain Corneau	
1991	La Totale!		Claude Zidi	
1992	A Heart in Winter		Claude Sautet	
1992	The Accompanist		Claude Miller	
1994	My Father the Hero		Steve Miner	
1994	A Pure Formality	Associate producer	Giuseppe Tornatore	
1994	The Smile		Claude Miller	
1994	Colonel Chabert		Yves Angelo	
1995	New World		Alain Corneau	
1995	L'amour conjugal		Benoît Barbier	
1996	The Best Job in the World		Gérard Lauzier	
1997	Droit dans le mur		Pierre Richard	
1998	Stolen Life		Yves Angelo	
1999	Monsieur Naphtali		Olivier Schatzky	
1999	Chili con carne		Thomas Gilou	
1999	The Frenchman's Son		Gérard Lauzier	
2000	Passionnément		Bruno Nuytten	
2000	La moitié du ciel		Alain Mazars	
2001	Read My Lips		Jacques Audiard	
2002	Sur le bout des doigts		Yves Angelo	
2003	The Overeater		Thierry Binisti	
2005	Je vous trouve très beau		Isabelle Mergault	
2007	The Merry Widow		Isabelle Mergault	
2008	Leur morale... et la nôtre		Florence Quentin	
2008	A Man and His Dog		Francis Huster	
2009	Wild Grass		Alain Resnais	
2009	I'm Glad My Mother Is Alive		Claude Miller and Nathan Miller	
2009	Mademoiselle Chambon	Co-producer	Stéphane Brizé	
2010	Une exécution ordinaire		Marc Dugain	
2010	Wandering Streams		Pascal Rabaté	
2011	La bonté des femmes		Yves Angelo and Marc Dugain	Television film
2012	10 jours en or		Nicolas Brossette	
2012	La danse de l'albatros		Nathan Miller	Television film
2012	You Ain't Seen Nothin' Yet		Alain Resnais	
2012	Camille Rewinds		Noémie Lvovsky	
2012	Quelques heures de printemps		Stéphane Brizé	
2013	Henri	Associate producer	Yolande Moreau	
2014	Life of Riley		Alain Resnais	
2014	Des fleurs pour Algernon		Yves Angelo	Television film
2014	Les trois silences		Laurent Herbiet	Television film
2015	Floride		Philippe Le Guay	
2017	Ava		Léa Mysius	
2017	Demain et tous les autres jours		Noémie Lvovsky	
2017	Reinventing Marvin		Anne Fontaine	
2020	The Father		Florian Zeller	
2020	Night Shift		Anne Fontaine	
2021	Les lendemains de veille	Co-producer	Loïc Paillard	
2022	Maigret		Patrice Leconte	
2022	The Five Devils		Léa Mysius	
2023	Casablanca	Co-producer	Adriano Valerio	
2024	Boléro		Anne Fontaine	
2024	À bicyclette !		Mathias Mlekuz	
2024	Rabia	Associate producer	Mareike Engelhardt	
2026	The Birthday Party		Léa Mysius	

== Awards and nominations ==
Award	Year	Category	Film	Result	Ref(s)
Academy Awards	2021	Best Picture	The Father	Nominated	
British Academy Film Awards	1994	Best Film Not in the English Language	A Heart in Winter	Nominated	
British Academy Film Awards	2021	Best Film	The Father	Nominated	
British Academy Film Awards	2021	Outstanding British Film	The Father	Nominated	
British Independent Film Awards	2021	Best British Independent Film	The Father	Nominated	
César Awards	2007	Best First Film	Je vous trouve très beau	Won	
César Awards	2010	Best Film	Wild Grass	Nominated	
César Awards	2013	Best Film	Camille Rewinds	Nominated	
European Film Awards	1993	Best Film	A Heart in Winter	Nominated	
European Film Awards	2021	Best Film	The Father	Nominated	

== Honours ==
- 9 July 2014: Commandeur of the Ordre des Arts et des Lettres
