= The Birthday Party (2026 film) =

2026 drama film by Léa Mysius

- Theatrical release poster
- French: Histoires de la Nuit
- Directed by: Léa Mysius
- Written by: Léa Mysius
- Based on: The Birthday Party by Laurent Mauvignier
- Produced by: Jean-Louis Livi
- Starring: Hafsia Herzi; Benoît Magimel; Bastien Bouillon; Monica Bellucci; Tawba El Gharchi; Paul Hamy; Alane Delhaye; Servane Ducorps; Tatia Tsuladze
- Cinematography: Paul Guilhaume
- Edited by: Yorgos Lamprinos
- Music by: Florencia Di Concilio
- Production companies: F Comme Film; France 3 Cinéma; Division; Beside Productions; MBPM
- Distributed by: Le Pacte
- Release dates: 22 May 2026 (Cannes); 16 September 2026 (France)
- Running time: 114 minutes
- Country: France
- Language: French
- Budget: €5 million

The Birthday Party (French: Histoires de la Nuit, lit. 'Night Stories') is a 2026 French drama film written and directed by Léa Mysius. It is based upon the novel of the same name by Laurent Mauvignier. It stars Hafsia Herzi, Benoît Magimel, Bastien Bouillon, Monica Bellucci, Tawba El Gharchi and Paul Hamy.

The film had its world premiere in the main competition of the 2026 Cannes Film Festival on 22 May, where it was nominated for the Palme d'Or and won CST Award for Best Young Female Artist-Technician. It was theatrically released in France by Le Pacte on 16 September.

== Premise ==
Thomas, Nora, and their daughter Ida live on a remote marshland, with limited social contact apart from their one neighbor. As they plan a surprise birthday party for Nora, strange disturbances begin to occur.

== Cast ==
- Hafsia Herzi as Nora
- Benoît Magimel as Franck
- Bastien Bouillon as Thomas
- Monica Bellucci as Cristina
- Tawba El Gharchi
- Paul Hamy as Flo
- Alane Delhaye
- Servane Ducorps
- Tatia Tsuladze

== Production ==
In October 2023, it was announced Léa Mysius would write and direct an adaptation of the novel of the same name by Laurent Mauvignier, with Jean-Louis Livi and Marie-Ange Luciani set to produce. In June 2025, it was announced Hafsia Herzi, Benoît Magimel, Bastien Bouillon, Monica Bellucci and Paul Hamy had joined the cast of the film.

Principal photography commenced on 2 June 2025 in Nouvelle-Aquitaine. The film was shot primarily on a private farm in La Croix-sur-Gartempe, with additional filming taking place in Nantiat. It had approximately a €4.98 million euros budget.

== Release ==
In January 2026, it was announced MK2 Films had boarded international sales, with Le Pacte set to distribute in France. It had its world premiere at the main competition of the 2026 Cannes Film Festival on 22 May. It was screened in the Summer Screen Programme section of the 32nd Sarajevo Film Festival in August 2026.

It was released in France on 16 September 2026.

== Reception ==
=== Critical response ===
On review aggregator Rotten Tomatoes, the film holds an approval rating of 58% based on 19 reviews, with an average rating of 5.5/10. On Metacritic, the film has a weighted average score of 55 out of 100, based on 8 critics, indicating "mixed or average reviews".

=== Accolades ===
Award	Date of ceremony	Category	Recipient(s)	Result	Ref.
Cannes Film Festival	23 May 2026	Palme d'Or	Léa Mysius	Nominated	
Cannes Film Festival	23 May 2026	CST Award for Best Young Female Artist-Technician	Esther Mysius	Won	
