= The Five Devils =

2022 film by Léa Mysius

- Theatrical release poster
- French: Les Cinq Diables
- Directed by: Léa Mysius
- Screenplay by: Léa Mysius; Paul Guilhaume
- Produced by: Jean-Louis Livi; Fanny Yvonnet
- Starring: Adèle Exarchopoulos; Sally Dramé; Swala Emati; Moustapha Mbengue; Daphné Patakia
- Cinematography: Paul Guilhaume
- Edited by: Marie Loustalot
- Music by: Florencia Di Concilio
- Production companies: F comme Film; Trois Brigands Productions
- Distributed by: Le Pacte
- Release dates: 23 May 2022 (Cannes); 31 August 2022 (France)
- Running time: 95 minutes
- Country: France
- Language: French
- Budget: €3.4 million
- Box office: $497,028

The Five Devils (French: Les Cinq Diables) is a 2022 French fantasy drama film directed by Léa Mysius, who co-wrote the screenplay with Paul Guilhaume. The film stars Adèle Exarchopoulos and Sally Dramé. It premiered in the Directors' Fortnight section of the Cannes Film Festival on 23 May 2022. It was released in France on 31 August 2022.

== Premise ==
Vicky has a magical gift: she can smell and reproduce any scent of her choosing. She collects these in carefully labelled jars. The solitary child has a very strong bond with her mother Joanne, whose scent she also captures. When her father's sister Julia, who has recently been released from prison, enters their lives, Vicky also begins to reproduce her scent. Vicky is transported back in time into dark and magical memories, leading her to discover the past love affair between her mother and Julia, the secrets of her village, and her own existence.

== Cast ==
- Adèle Exarchopoulos as Joanne Soler
- Sally Dramé as Vicky Soler
- Swala Emati as Julia Soler
- Moustapha Mbengue as Jimmy Soler
- Daphné Patakia as Nadine
- Patrick Bouchitey as Jean-Yvon
- Noée Abita as waitress
- Merwan Rim as karaoke DJ

== Production ==
The Five Devils is Léa Mysius's second feature film as director, following Ava in 2017. Mysius co-wrote the film's screenplay with its cinematographer Paul Guilhaume.

The film was produced by Fanny Yvonnet for Trois Brigands Productions and by Jean-Louis Livi for F comme Film, both of whom previously produced Ava. The Five Devils benefited from production support from Auvergne-Rhône-Alpes Cinéma (and support from the Auvergne-Rhône-Alpes region itself), pre-sales from Canal+ and Ciné+, and support from the Île-de-France region.

Filming was set to begin in March 2020, but was interrupted due to the COVID-19 pandemic. Filming resumed in March 2021 and lasted seven weeks. Filming took place in Isère between 1–24 March 2021, in the commune Le Bourg-d'Oisans and at Lac Bleu. Shooting continued in the Île-de-France region, including the Michel-Beaufort swimming pool in Bondy on 31 March and 1 April 2021. Filming wrapped in Paris on 16 April 2021.

== Release ==
The Five Devils had its world premiere in the Directors' Fortnight section of the Cannes Film Festival on 23 May 2022, where it received a five-minute standing ovation. It was released theatrically in France on 31 August 2022 by Le Pacte. International sales are handled by Wild Bunch. In a deal negotiated by Wild Bunch, Mubi acquired The Five Devils for North America, the United Kingdom, Ireland, Latin America, India and Turkey. Mubi gave the film a limited theatrical release in the United States, United Kingdom and Ireland on 24 March 2023. The film was released exclusively on Mubi's streaming platform from 12 May 2023.

== Reception ==
=== Box office ===
The Five Devils grossed $336,025 in France and $161,003 in other territories, for a worldwide total of $497,028.

In France, the film opened alongside Everything Everywhere All at Once, La Dégustation, Both Sides of the Blade and La Page blanche. The film sold 4,922 admissions on its first day, 485 of which were preview screenings. It went on to sell 25,906 admissions in its opening weekend. At the end of its theatrical run, the film sold a total of 71,833 admissions.

=== Critical response ===
On the review aggregator website Rotten Tomatoes, the film holds an approval rating of 85% based on 74 reviews, with an average rating of 6.9/10. The website's critics consensus reads, "Overflowing with ideas as it moves across genres, The Five Devils uses intoxicating magical realism to explore a family's troubled past." Metacritic, which uses a weighted average, assigned the film a score of 68 out of 100, based on 19 critics, indicating "generally favorable" reviews. The Five Devils received an average rating of 3.2 out of 5 stars on the French website AlloCiné, based on 31 reviews.

Jordan Mintzer of The Hollywood Reporter assessed the film as having too many elements, criticising screenwriters Mysius and Guilhaume for infusing an "otherwise compelling and intimate tragedy with elements of witchcraft, the supernatural and time travel that feel like they belong in another film—whether it's by Shyamalan or Robert Eggers, or something from the Marvel Cinematic Universe. Rather than enhancing the intrigue, the genre components wind up diluting it, and when the two sides of the movie ultimately come together, the impact feels blunted".

Writing for Deadline Hollywood, Valerie Complex was mostly positive on the film, but criticised the way it depicted its Black characters, writing, "There are many movies with Black protagonists at Cannes, but Black people direct none [...] Julia and Jimmy aren't given much agency. They exist as a platform for Joanne, who uses them to elevate herself [...] And the hair. Look, Black hairstylists need to be consulted and hired to give Black characters decent-looking hairstyles. Unkempt hair and bad wigs plague Black actresses on sets, and The Five Devils falls into this trap. Films have to start investing in the complete aesthetic of Blackness, and that means getting people who can bring the most authenticity to a character".

Jake Cole of Slant Magazine praised the film, stating it "feels like the work of a much more seasoned filmmaker" and that Mysius' filmmaking "exudes an exquisite command of atmosphere and aesthetic language".

=== Accolades ===
Award	Date of ceremony	Category	Recipient(s)	Result	Ref.
Cannes Film Festival	27 May 2022	Queer Palm	Léa Mysius	Nominated	
César Awards	24 February 2023	Best Visual Effects	Guillaume Marien	Nominated	
Dublin International Film Festival	4 March 2023	Best Director	Léa Mysius	Won	
Fantastic Fest	27 September 2022	Best Picture (Next Wave Competition)	The Five Devils	Won	
Prix Alice Guy	13 April 2023	—N/a	Léa Mysius	Nominated	
