= Noée Abita =

French actress (born 1999)

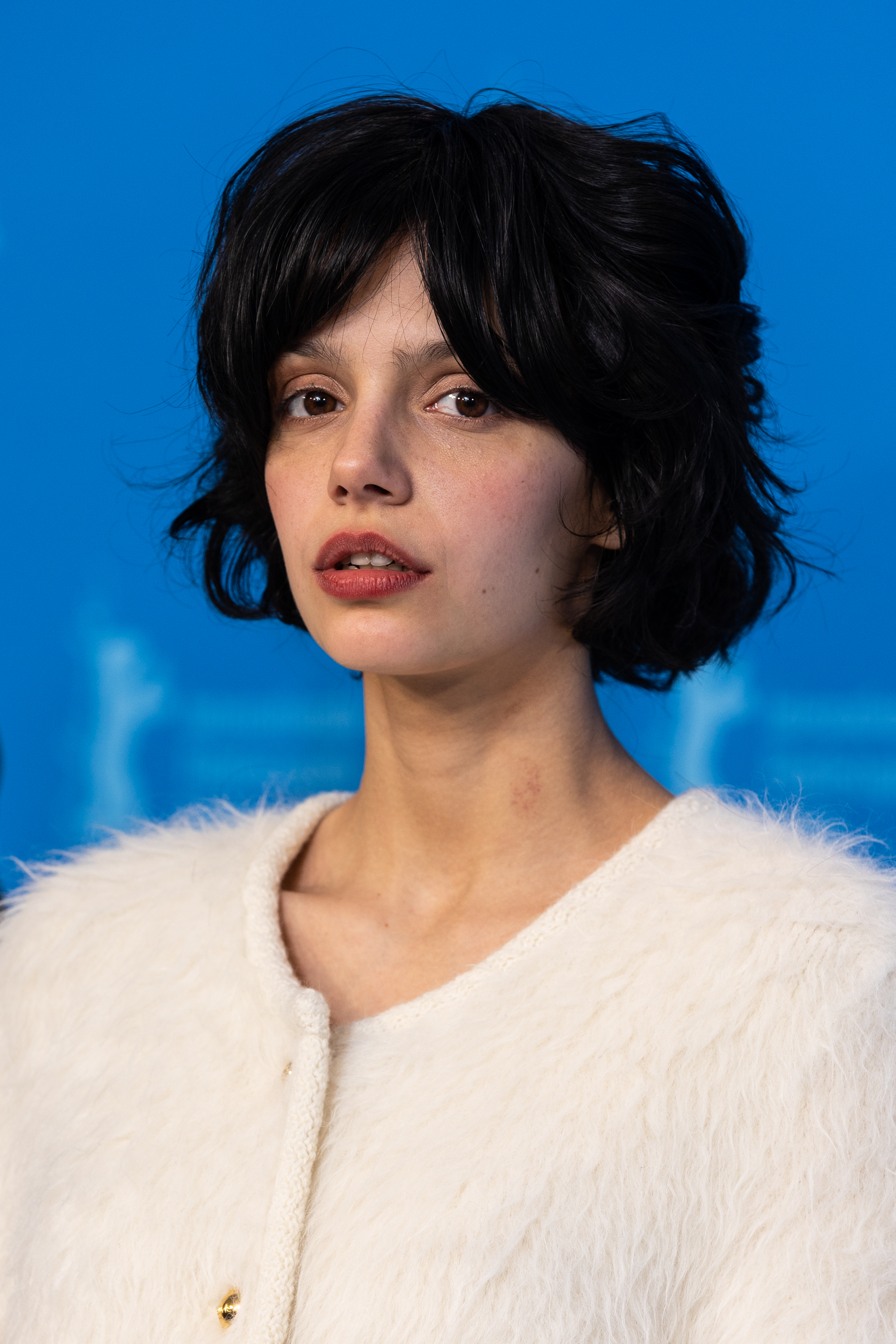
- Abita at the 72nd Berlin International Film Festival, 2022
- Born: 18 March 1999 (age 27); Paris, Ile-de-France, France
- Occupation: Actress
- Years active: 2017–present

Noée Abita (born 18 March 1999) is a French actress.

== Life ==
Abita was born in Paris or in Aix-en-Provence on 18 March 1999. At a young age, she dreamed of becoming an actress. In 2016, when she was 17, she went to a talent manager with a friend. She met Léa Mysius who was looking for a young actress for the title role of her first feature film, Ava. Although the role is that of a 13-year-old girl, Abita was selected by the director, because her real age and physical appearance are assets for the nude scenes provided in the scenario, even if she initially refused to undress for the film before finally feeling comfortable with nudity. For her part, Abita recognized herself in the character, because of her character and her eye problems. Her performance was hailed by the press, and in November 2017, she was shortlisted for the César Award for Most Promising Actress.

After Ava, she followed with a supporting role in Gilles Lellouche's Le Grand Bain and a main role in Genesis by Philippe Lesage. She then co-starred in Slalom.

== Filmography ==
Key
†	Denotes productions that have not yet been released

=== Feature films ===
Year	Title	Role	Director	Notes
2017	Ava	Ava	Léa Mysius	
2018	Sink or Swim	Lola	Gilles Lellouche	
2018	Genesis	Charlotte	Philippe Lesage	
2019	My Days of Glory	Léa	Antoine de Bary	
2020	Slalom	Lyz	Charlène Favier	
2022	The Passengers of the Night	Talulah	Mikhaël Hers	
2022	The Five Devils	Waitress	Léa Mysius	
2022	Blind Willow, Sleeping Woman	Jeune fille (voice)	Pierre Földes	
2022	Maria Into Life	Naomie Hosseinzadeh	Lauriane Escaffre and Yvo Muller	
2023	First Case (Première affaire)	Nora	Victoria Musiedlak	
2024	Jim's Story	Aurélie	Arnaud Larrieu and Jean-Marie Larrieu	
2026	Cap Farewell	Toni		

=== Short films ===
Year	Title	Role	Director	Notes
2018	Vint la Vague	Mathilde	Benjamin Busnel	
2018	Odol Gorri	Eva	Charlène Favier	
2019	Nobody Likes You as Much as I Do	Stéphanie	Jerzy Rose	
2019	The Legend	Celle qui part	Manon Eyriey	
2020	Love Hurts	Sam	Elsa Rysto	
2020	Tender Age	Diane	Julien Gaspar-Oliveri	
2022	Harmony	Claire	Olivier Bohler and Céline Gailleurd	

=== Television ===
Year	Title	Role	Director	Notes
2019–2020	Apnea	Chloé	Julien Trousselier	Miniseries
2025	The Seduction	Madame de Tourvel	Jessica Palud	TV series
