= The Nothing Factory =

2017 film

- Film poster
- Directed by: Pedro Pinho
- Written by: Pedro Pinho
- Produced by: Joao Matos; Leonor Noivo; Luisa Homem; Pedro Pinho; Susana Nobre; Tiago Hespanha
- Starring: Carla Galvão
- Cinematography: Vasco Viana
- Edited by: Claudia Oliveira; Edgar Feldman; Luisa Homem
- Music by: Jose Smith Vargas; Pedro Rodrigues
- Distributed by: Memento
- Release dates: 25 May 2017 (Cannes); 21 September 2017 (Portugal)
- Running time: 176 minutes
- Country: Portugal
- Language: Portuguese

The Nothing Factory (Portuguese: A Fábrica de Nada) is a 2017 Portuguese drama film directed by Pedro Pinho, whose prior works were documentaries. It was screened in the Directors' Fortnight section at the 2017 Cannes Film Festival and the Bright Future section at the International Film Festival Rotterdam. At Cannes it won the FIPRESCI Prize.

== Plot ==
"One night, a group of workers realizes that their administration has organized the stealing of machines from their factory. They soon understand that this is the first signal of a massive layoff. Most of them refuse to co-operate during the individual negotiations and they start to occupy their workplace...."

The film is inspired in part by the Portuguese Fataleva (Fortis Elevadores Ltda) factory workers who ran it collectively from 1975 to 2016, after being taken over by the Otis Elevator Company in 1970. It is inspired in part by De Nietsfabriek, a 1997 Dutch play by playwright and poet Judith Herzberg.

== Production ==
The Nothing Factory was shot with 16 mm film and grainy in appearance. A Portuguese collective of filmmakers who share all credits, Terratreme, produced this work, and all of Pinho's prior works.

== Cast ==
- Carla Galvão
- Dinis Gomes
- Américo Silva
- José Smith Vargas

== Screening ==
Before The Nothing Factory was screened at the Cannes Film Festival, the film was shown at various international film festivals, among which was Calgary, Pune, Thessaloniki and BFI London Film Festival.

== Reception ==
On review aggregator website Rotten Tomatoes, the film holds an approval rating of 81%, based on 26 reviews, and an average rating of 7.1/10. On Metacritic, the film has a weighted average score of 59 out of 100, based on 7 critics, indicating "mixed or average reviews".

Jessica Kiang of Variety, while attending its screening at the Karlovy Vary International Film Festival, called The Nothing Factory "a shaggily eccentric but overlong and undisciplined drama". Peter Bradshaw of The Guardian, said that the film is "a sprawling, intriguing, but finally exhausting film", "evasive and self-deconstructing", adding as well that an "enigmatic story is acted with sincerity and force". Diego Semerene of Slant Magazine, gave the film 2 out of 4 and called it "cerebral". Screen Daily said, "The film gets more unpredictable as it goes along...an ensemble piece with something of a community theatre feel" The Hollywood Reporter said, "The straightforward, nonfiction-like material is laced with short montage sequences, set to rock music, in which capitalism and the current state of the Old Continent are discussed in voiceover." Northern Lights: Film & Media Studies Yearbook said, "The Nothing Factory is a prime example of the cinema of small nations"

== Accolades ==
2018 Sophia Awards (pt) for Best Editing, Best Adapted Screenplay.
