= Slalom (2020 film) =

2020 drama film

- Theatrical release poster
- Directed by: Charlène Favier
- Written by: Charlène Favier; Marie Talon
- Produced by: Edouard Mauriat; Anne-Cécile Berthomeau
- Starring: Noée Abita; Jérémie Renier
- Cinematography: Yann Maritaud
- Edited by: Maxime Pozzi-Garcia
- Music by: Low Entertainment
- Production companies: Mille et une productions; Auvergne-Rhône-Alpes Cinéma; Jour2Fête Distribution; Panache Productions; La Compagnie Cinématographique; Charlie Bus Production
- Distributed by: Jour2Fête
- Release dates: 29 August 2020 (Angoulême); 19 May 2021 (France); 9 June 2021 (Belgium)
- Running time: 92 minutes
- Countries: France; Belgium
- Language: French
- Box office: $572,724

Slalom is a 2020 drama film directed by Charlène Favier in her feature debut, and co-written by Favier and Marie Talon. It is a co-production between France and Belgium. The film stars Noée Abita and Jérémie Renier. The film was selected for the 2020 Cannes Film Festival. It screened at the Angoulême Francophone Film Festival on 29 August 2020. It was released in France on 19 May 2021.

== Synopsis ==
Slalom follows the relationship between a teenage ski prodigy and her predatory coach. 15-year-old Lyz earns admission to a prestigious ski school in Bourg-Saint-Maurice. A former ski champion turned instructor, Fred takes a chance on training Lyz. With his support, Lyz commits herself wholeheartedly, physically and emotionally to skiing. She has a streak of wins but quickly falls under Fred's influence.

== Cast ==
- Noée Abita as Lyz Lopez
- Jérémie Renier as Fred
- Marie Denarnaud as Lilou
- Muriel Combeau as Catherine
- Maïra Schmitt as Justine
- Axel Auriant as Max
- Frédéric Épaud as France team coach
- Catherine Marchal as Justine's mother

== Production ==
Charlène Favier began writing the screenplay in 2014 when she was studying in the script workshop at La Fémis. The writing process took three years. Favier drew from personal experience and her own upbringing in the ski resort of Val-d'Isère.

Slalom was produced by Edouard Mauriat and Anne-Cécile Berthomeau on behalf of Mille et une productions, in coproduction with Auvergne-Rhône-Alpes Cinéma, Jour2Fête Distribution, Panache Productions, La Compagnie Cinématographique and Charlie Bus Production. The film was shot in five weeks with a budget of a little over 1 million euros. Filming took place entirely in the Savoie department from mid-January to mid-February 2019, in the resorts of Les Arcs in Bourg-Saint-Maurice, Tignes and Val d'Isère.

== Release ==
Slalom was included in the First Features section of the official selection of the 2020 Cannes Film Festival, which was cancelled due to the global COVID-19 pandemic. It was screened for press and industry in an online edition of the Cannes Marché du Film in June 2020. The film was subsequently screened at the 13th Angoulême Francophone Film Festival on 29 August 2020. The film was initially scheduled to be released in theaters in France on 4 November 2020, which was rescheduled to 16 December 2020 as a result of the COVID-19 pandemic. As cinemas in France remained subject to outright closures, the film was further postponed to an indefinite date. Slalom was finally released in France by Jour2Fête on 19 May 2021, the day French cinemas reopened after a six-month shutdown. The film was distributed in Belgium on 9 June 2021, the day Belgian cinemas reopened.

== Reception ==
=== Critical response ===
On Rotten Tomatoes, the film holds an approval rating of 100% based on 57 reviews, with an average rating of 7.5/10. The site's critics consensus reads: "Led by Noée Abita's outstanding central performance, Slalom offers a moving account of oppression and abuse in the guise of mentorship." According to Metacritic, which assigned a weighted average score of 77 out of 100 based on 13 critics, the film received "generally favorable" reviews. Slalom received an average rating of 3.8 out of 5 stars on the French website AlloCiné, based on 29 reviews.

Jessica Kiang of Variety called it "Well-made, perceptively performed and deeply enraging, it's a difficult but necessary watch". Tomris Laffly of RogerEbert.com wrote, "Delivering an unforgettable breakthrough performance, Abita is phenomenal in pitching Lyz on the slippery slope between an adult wannabe and a little kid, boldly wearing even the smallest nuances of her character's rapidly shifting emotional world on her resolute face". Peter Bradshaw of The Guardian wrote, "The grey area between passionately committed teaching and abuse is a familiar topic. Yet the film ingeniously merges it with the ambiguous experience of slalom ski-ing: exhilarating and euphoric, but also dangerous and even an emotional death-wish, surrendering to the downhill rush". Bilge Ebiri, reviewing the film for Vulture, wrote, "The film is too rich and too human for any kind of categorization. But for all its beauty, it's also quite an unsettling watch - a delicate, authentic look at the complicated ways in which abuse works".

=== Accolades ===
Award	Date of ceremony	Category	Recipient(s)	Result	Ref.
Angoulême Francophone Film Festival	2 September 2020	Valois Magelis des Étudiants Francophones	Slalom	Won	
César Awards	25 February 2022	Best First Film	Slalom	Nominated	
César Awards	25 February 2022	Most Promising Actress	Noée Abita	Nominated	
Deauville American Film Festival	13 September 2020	Prix d'Ornano-Valenti	Slalom	Won	
European Film Awards	12 December 2020	European University Film Award	Slalom	Nominated	
Lumière Awards	19 January 2021	Best Female Revelation	Noée Abita	Won	
Lumière Awards	19 January 2021	Best Actor	Jérémie Renier	Nominated	
Lumière Awards	19 January 2021	Best First Film	Charlène Favier	Nominated	
Lumière Awards	19 January 2021	Best Cinematography	Yann Maritaud	Nominated	
Magritte Awards	12 February 2022	Best Actor	Jérémie Renier	Nominated	
