= Lucie Zhang =

French actress

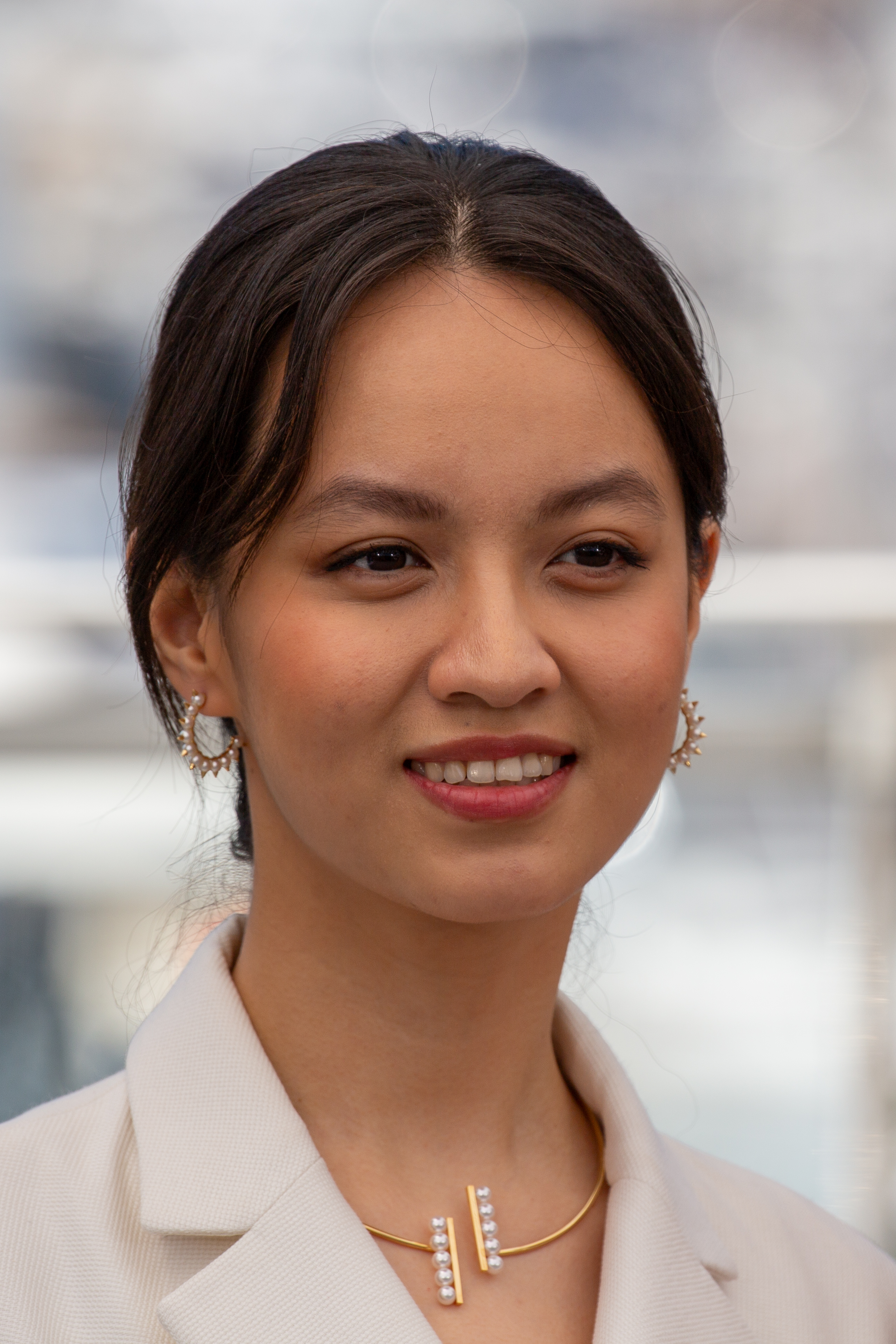
- Zhang at the 2025 Cannes Film Festival
- Born: 27 October 2000 (age 25); 13th arrondissement, Paris, France
- Occupation: Actress
- Years active: 2020–present

Chinese name
- Simplified Chinese: 张润黎
- Traditional Chinese: 張潤黎
Transcriptions
Standard Mandarin
- Hanyu Pinyin: Zhāng Rùnlí
- Wade–Giles: Chang Jun-li

Lucie Zhang (born 27 October 2000) is a French actress. She received critical acclaim for her feature film debut Paris, 13th District (2021), which earned her César and Lumière Award nominations. She appeared on the UniFrance and Screen International list of rising French talents to watch.

== Early life and education ==
Zhang was born in the 13th arrondissement of Paris to Chinese parents, her father from Yunnan and her mother from Henan, who met after individually moving to Paris. She has two younger siblings. The family moved out to the 16th arrondissement and opened a restaurant on Avenue de Versailles. She trained in acting at the Cours Florent and Francis Poulenc Municipal Conservatory. She pursued a degree in economic management at Paris Dauphine University.

== Filmography ==
| Year | Title | Role | Notes |
|---|---|---|---|
| 2020 | Desire (French: Désir) | | Short film |
| 2021 | Paris, 13th District (French: Les Olympiades) | Émilie Wong | |
| 2023 | Captives (French: Captives) | Amanite | |
| 2023 | A Real Job (French: Un métier sérieux) | Sophie | |
| 2025 | No One Will Know (French: Le Roi Soleil) | | |

== Awards and nominations ==
| Year | Award | Category | Work | Result | Ref |
|---|---|---|---|---|---|
| 2021 | Seville European Film Festival | Best Actress | Paris, 13th District | Won | |
| 2022 | Lumière Awards | Best Female Revelation | Paris, 13th District | Nominated | |
| 2022 | International Cinephile Society | Best Breakthrough Performance | Paris, 13th District | Pending | |
| 2022 | César Awards | Most Promising Actress | Paris, 13th District | Nominated | |
