= Makala (film) =

2017 film

- Film poster
- Directed by: Emmanuel Gras
- Written by: Emmanuel Gras
- Release date: 23 May 2017 (Cannes)
- Running time: 96 minutes
- Country: France
- Language: French

Makala is a 2017 French documentary film directed by Emmanuel Gras. It was screened in the Critics' Week section at the 2017 Cannes Film Festival. At Cannes, it won the Nespresso Grand Prize.

== Synopsis ==
The story begins without explanation of what the young man, Kabwita, is planning to do. He walks through scattered scrub, and begins to cut down a tree. It seems to be a task too great for one man and his simple axe. Eventually the tree falls, he dismembers it, and builds a huge charcoal oven for it. Over time, the wood converts to charcoal and he loads it into several sacks, which he attaches to a bicycle and begins the journey to a nearby city, 50 km away, to sell it. He hopes to earn enough money to be able to buy roofing iron, so he can build a better house in the village of Kolwezi, for his family, who have been reduced to roasting rats for sustenance. One of his children has a stomach ailment. There are others on the road as he approaches the city, pushing the heavily loaded bicycle. Extortionate toll pirates take one of his sacks as payment to let him pass on the road, and in the city he finds his price is continually beaten down. He buys some medicine for his child, but at an exorbitant price. Eventually he has sold all the charcoal but the roofing iron he wants is too expensive. He cannot buy any of it. He goes to a religious meeting, where a pastor sings and the desperate participants seem to gain hope from the fervour, words and rhythms of the meeting.
