= Annarita Zambrano =

Italian film director

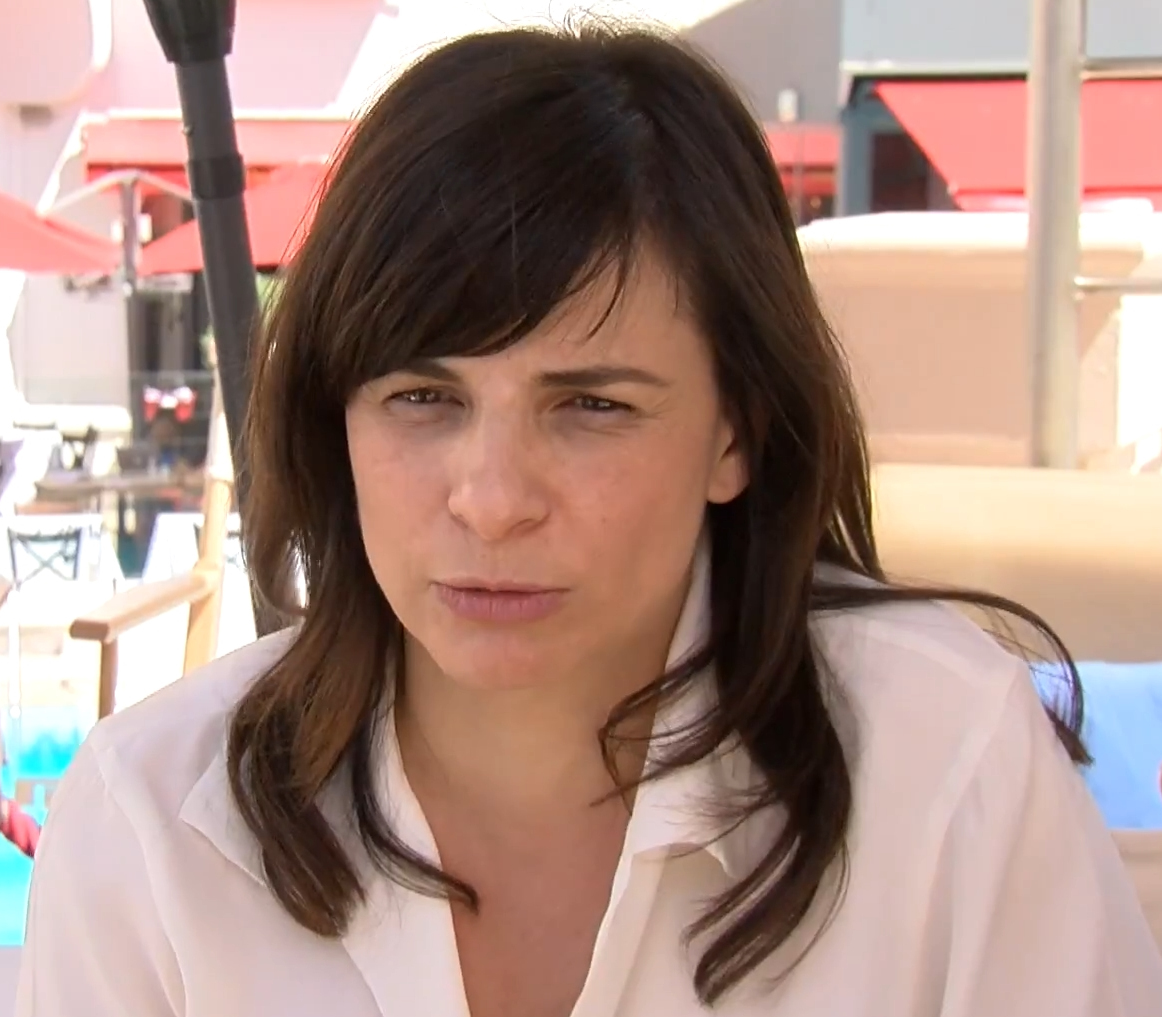
- Occupation: Film director
- Years active: 1998—present
- Notable work: After the War (2017)

Annarita Zambrano is an Italian film director.

She graduated in Modern Literature from Sapienza and in 2000 moved to Paris to work on her doctoral thesis on the aesthetics of cinema.

She has made a name for herself as a filmmaker after a series of successful short films that have screened at influential film festivals: La troisième fois (2006), Andante Mezzo Forte (2007), À la lune montante (2009), Tre ore (2010), Dans le coeur des grands (2012). Dans le coeur des grands won the Grand Prix at 2012 Conti Film Festival.

In 2013, she filmed a documentary L'anima del Gattopardo about Luchino Visconti, made for Ciné+ and RAI channels. In the same year her short film Ophelis was selected for the Short Film Competition in Cannes.

Her debut feature After the War was screened in the Un Certain Regard section at the 2017 Cannes Film Festival.

Her sophomore feature, a dark comedy Rossosperanza, was screened at the 76th Locarno Film Festival. For Rossosperanza, Zambrano was honoured with the Titrafilm Award at 2022 Les Arcs Film Festival.

== Filmography ==
- La troisième fois — short (2006)
- Andante Mezzo Forte — short (2007)
- À la lune montante — short (2009)
- Three hours (Italian: Tre ore) — short (2010)
- Dans le coeur des grands — short (2012)
- Ophelia — short (2013)
- L'anima del Gattopardo — documentary (2015)
- After the War (2017)
- Rossosperanza (2023)
