= 2017 Cannes Film Festival =

- Official poster of the 70th Cannes Film Festival featuring a still of Italian actress Claudia Cardinale at a rooftop in Rome in 1959
- Opening film: Ismael's Ghosts
- Closing film: The Square
- Location: Cannes, France
- Founded: 1946
- Awards: Palme d'Or: The Square
- Hosted by: Monica Bellucci
- No. of films: 19 (In Competition)
- Festival date: 17–28 May 2017
- Website: www.festival-cannes.com/en/

Cannes Film Festival
- 2018 2016

The 70th Cannes Film Festival took place from 17 to 28 May 2017, in Cannes, France. Spanish filmmaker Pedro Almodóvar was the president of the jury for the main competition. Italian actress Monica Bellucci hosted the opening and closing ceremonies. Swedish filmmaker Ruben Östlund won the Palme d'Or, the festival's top prize, for his comedy-drama film The Square.

The festival celebrated its 70th edition with a special anniversary section featuring some of the new works from well established filmmakers. The official poster of the festival featured Italian actress Claudia Cardinale. The actress responded: "'I am honored and proud to be flying the flag for the 70th Festival de Cannes, and delighted with this choice of photo. It's the image I myself have of the Festival, of an event that illuminates everything around ... Happy anniversary!"

The festival opened with Ismael's Ghosts by Arnaud Desplechin, and closed with The Square.

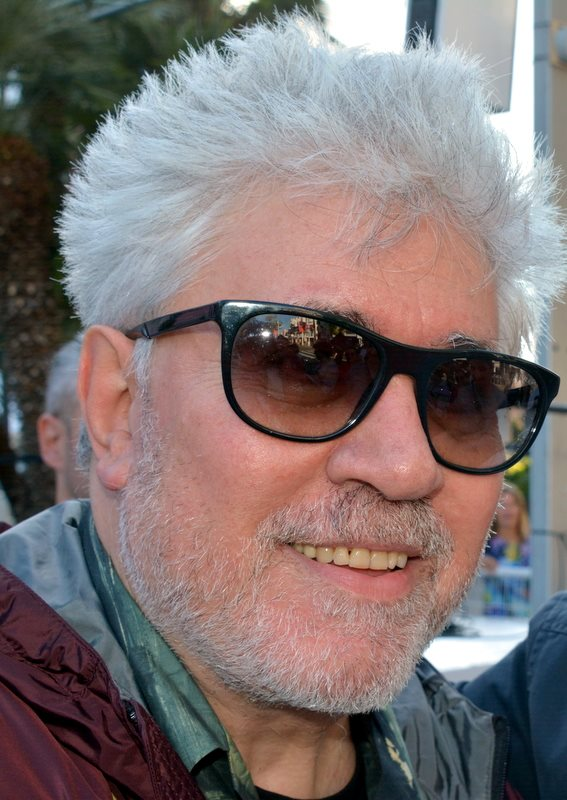
Pedro Almodóvar, Main competition jury president

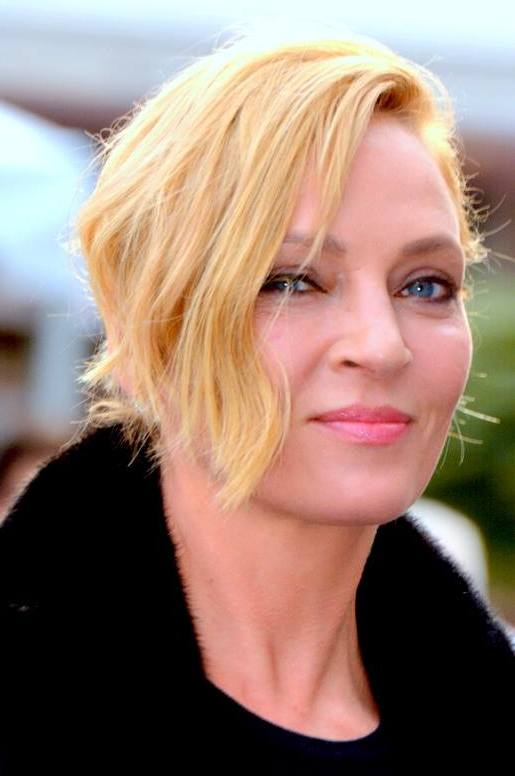
Uma Thurman, Un Certain Regard jury president

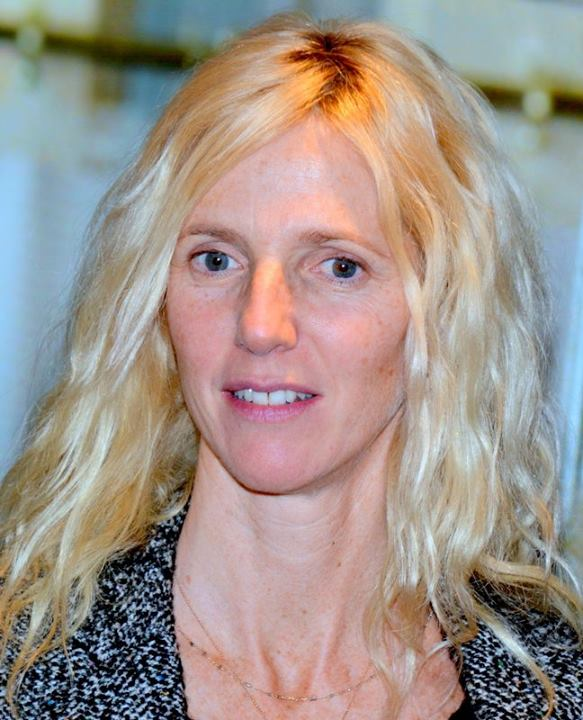
Sandrine Kiberlain, Caméra d'or jury president

== Juries ==
=== Main competition ===
- Pedro Almodóvar, Spanish filmmaker – Jury President
- Maren Ade, German filmmaker
- Jessica Chastain, American actress and producer
- Fan Bingbing, Chinese actress
- Agnès Jaoui, French actress and filmmaker
- Park Chan-wook, South Korean filmmaker
- Will Smith, American actor and producer
- Paolo Sorrentino, Italian filmmaker
- Gabriel Yared, French-Lebanese composer

=== Un Certain Regard ===
- Uma Thurman, American actress – Jury President
- Mohamed Diab, Egyptian filmmaker
- Reda Kateb, French actor
- Joachim Lafosse, Belgian filmmaker
- Karel Och, Czech artistic director of Karlovy Vary International Film Festival

=== Caméra d'or ===
- Sandrine Kiberlain, French actress – Jury President
- Patrick Blossier, French cinematographer
- Elodie Bouchez, French actress
- Guillaume Brac, French filmmaker
- Thibault Carterot, French president of M141 Productions
- Fabien Gaffez, French film critic
- Michel Merkt, Swiss film producer

=== Cinéfondation and Short Films Competition ===
- Cristian Mungiu, Romanian filmmaker – Jury President
- Clotilde Hesme, French actress
- Barry Jenkins, American filmmaker
- Eric Khoo, Singaporean filmmaker
- Athina Rachel Tsangari, Greek filmmaker

=== Independent juries ===
==== Nespresso Grand Prize (Critics' Week) ====
- Kleber Mendonça Filho, Brazilian filmmaker – Jury President
- Diana Bustamante Escobar, Colombian film producer and artistic director of FICCI
- Eric Kohn, American film critic
- Hania Mroué, Lebanese director of Metropolis Cinema
- Niels Schneider, French-Canadian actor

==== L'Œil d'or ====
- Sandrine Bonnaire, French actress and filmmaker – Jury President
- Lorenzo Codelli, Italian film critic
- Dror Moreh, Israeli filmmaker
- Thom Powers, American programmer and festival director
- Lucy Walker, British filmmaker

==== Queer Palm ====
- Travis Mathews, American filmmaker – Jury President
- Yair Hochner, Israeli film director, founder and artistic director of TLVFest
- Paz Lazaro, Spanish film programmer
- Didier Roth-Bettoni, French journalist and film historian
- Lidia Leber Terki, French filmmaker

== Official selection ==
=== In Competition ===
The following films were selected to compete for the Palme d'Or:

English Title	Original Title	Director(s)	Production Country
L'Amant double		François Ozon	France, Belgium
The Beguiled		Sofia Coppola	United States
BPM (Beats per Minute) (QP)	120 battements par minute	Robin Campillo	France
The Day After	그 후	Hong Sang-soo	South Korea
A Gentle Creature	Кроткая	Sergei Loznitsa	France, Ukraine, Germany, Latvia, Lithuania, Netherlands, Russia
Good Time		Josh and Benny Safdie	United States
Happy End		Michael Haneke	France, Germany, Austria
In the Fade	Aus dem Nichts	Fatih Akin	Germany, France
Jupiter's Moon	Jupiter holdja	Kornél Mundruczó	Hungary
The Killing of a Sacred Deer		Yorgos Lanthimos	Ireland, United Kingdom
Loveless	Нелюбовь	Andrey Zvyagintsev	Russia, France, Belgium, Germany
The Meyerowitz Stories (New and Selected)		Noah Baumbach	United States
Okja	옥자	Bong Joon-ho	South Korea, United States
Radiance	光	Naomi Kawase	Japan
Redoubtable	Le Redoutable	Michel Hazanavicius	France
Rodin		Jacques Doillon	France, Belgium
The Square		Ruben Östlund	Sweden, Germany, France, Denmark
Wonderstruck		Todd Haynes	United States
You Were Never Really Here		Lynne Ramsay	United Kingdom, France

(QP) indicates film eligible for the Queer Palm.

=== Un Certain Regard ===
The films competing in the Un Certain Regard section were announced at a press conference on 13 April 2017. Barbara, directed by Mathieu Amalric, was announced as the opening film for the Un Certain Regard section. The following films were selected to compete in the Un Certain Regard section:

English Title	Original Title	Director(s)	Production Country
After the War (CdO)	Après la guerre	Annarita Zambrano	France
April's Daughter	Las hijas de abril	Michel Franco	Mexico
Barbara (opening film)		Mathieu Amalric	France
Beauty and the Dogs	على كف عفريت	Kaouther Ben Hania	France, Tunisia, Sweden, Norway, Lebanon, Switzerland
Before We Vanish	散歩する侵略者	Kiyoshi Kurosawa	Japan
Closeness (CdO)	Теснота	Kantemir Balagov	Russia
The Desert Bride (CdO)	La novia del desierto	Cecilia Atán and Valeria Pivato	Argentina, Chile
Directions	Посоки	Stephan Komandarev	Bulgaria, Germany, Republic of Macedonia
Fortunata		Sergio Castellitto	Italy
A Man of Integrity	لِرد	Mohammad Rasoulof	Iran
Montparnasse Bienvenue (CdO)	Jeune Femme	Léonor Serraille	France, Belgium
Out (CdO)	Vychladnutie	György Kristóf	Slovakia
The Summit	La cordillera	Santiago Mitre	Argentina, France, Spain
Until the Birds Return (CdO)	En Attendant les hirondelles	Karim Moussaoui	France
Walking Past the Future	路過未來	Li Ruijun	China
Western		Valeska Grisebach	Germany, Austria, Bulgaria
Wind River (CdO)		Taylor Sheridan	United States, France, United Kingdom
The Workshop	L'Atelier	Laurent Cantet	France

(CdO) indicates film eligible for the Caméra d'Or as directorial debut feature.

=== Out of Competition ===
The following films were selected to be screened out of competition:

English Title	Original Title	Director(s)	Production Country
Based on a True Story	D'après une histoire vraie	Roman Polanski	France, Poland
Blade of the Immortal	無限の住人	Takashi Miike	Japan, United Kingdom, South Korea
Faces Places (ŒdO)	Visages Villages	Agnès Varda and JR	France
How to Talk to Girls at Parties		John Cameron Mitchell	United Kingdom, United States
Ismael's Ghosts (opening film)	Les fantômes d'Ismaël	Arnaud Desplechin	France
Midnight Screenings
A Prayer Before Dawn		Jean-Stéphane Sauvaire	France, United Kingdom, United States, China
The Merciless	불한당	Byun Sung-hyun	South Korea
The Villainess	악녀	Jung Byung-gil	South Korea

(ŒdO) indicates film eligible for the Œil d'or as documentary.

=== Special Screenings ===
The following films were selected to be screened in the Special Screenings section:

English Title	Original Title	Director(s)	Production Country
12 Days (ŒdO)	12 Jours	Raymond Depardon	France
Claire's Camera	La caméra de Claire	Hong Sang-soo	South Korea, France
Demons in Paradise (CdO) (ŒdO)		Jude Ratnam	France, Sri Lanka
Golden Years (QP)	Nos années folles	André Téchiné	France
An Inconvenient Sequel: Truth to Power (ŒdO)		Bonni Cohen and Jon Shenk	United States
The King (ŒdO)		Eugene Jarecki	United States
Napalm (ŒdO)		Claude Lanzmann	France
Plot 35 (ŒdO)	Carré 35	Éric Caravaca	France, Germany
Sea Sorrow (ŒdO)		Vanessa Redgrave	United Kingdom
They (CdO) (QP)		Anahita Ghazvinizadeh	United States, Qatar
The Venerable W. (ŒdO)	Le Vénérable W.	Barbet Schroeder	France, Switzerland
Zombillenium (CdO)	Zombillénium	Arthur de Pins and Alexis Ducord	France, Belgium

(CdO) indicates film eligible for the Caméra d'Or as directorial debut feature.
(ŒdO) film eligible for the Œil d'or as documentary.
(QP) film eligible for the Queer Palm.

=== Virtual Reality ===
English Title	Original Title	Director(s)	Production Country
Flesh and Sand	Carne y arena	Alejandro González Iñárritu	United States

=== 70th Anniversary Events ===
The following films were selected to be screened in the 70th Anniversary section:

English Title	Original Title	Director(s)	Production Country
24 Frames	۲۴ فریم	Abbas Kiarostami	Iran, France
Come Swim (short)		Kristen Stewart	United States
Top of the Lake: China Girl (6 episodes)		Jane Campion and Ariel Kleiman	United Kingdom, Australia, New Zealand, United States
Twin Peaks: The Return (Part 1 and 2)		David Lynch	United States

=== Cinéfondation ===
The Cinéfondation section focuses on films made by students at film schools. The following 16 entries (14 fiction films and 2 animation films) were selected out of 2,600 submissions. Four of the films selected represent schools participating in Cinéfondation for the first time.

English Title	Original Title	Director(s)	School
Afternoon Clouds		Payal Kapadia	FTII, India
Animal	حیوان	Bahman and Bahram Ark	Iranian National School of Cinema, Iran
Atlantis, 2003	Атлантида, 2003	Michal Blaško	FTF VŠMU, Slovakia
Breathless	À perdre haleine	Léa Krawczyk	La Poudrière, France
Camouflage		Imge Özbilge	KASK, Belgium
Empty on the Outside	Vazio do Lado de Fora	Eduardo Brandão Pinto	UFF, Brazil
Give Up The Ghost		Marian Mathias	NYU Tisch School of the Arts, United States
Heritage	בן ממשיך	Yuval Aharoni	TAU, Israel
Invisibly	Láthatatlan	Áron Szentpéteri	Academy of Drama and Film in Budapest, Hungary
Lejla		Stijn Bouma	Sarajevo Film Academy, Bosnia and Herzegovina
Little Manifesto Against Solemn Cinema	Pequeño manifiesto en contra del cine solemne	Roberto Porta	Universidad del Cine, Argentina
Paul Is Here	Paul est là	Valentina Maurel	INSAS, Belgium
Tokeru	溶ける	Aya Igashi	Toho Gakuen Film Techniques Training College, Japan
Towards the Sun	迎向邊疆公路	Wang Yi-ling	NTUA, Taiwan
Two Youths Died	Deux Égarés sont morts	Tommaso Usberti	La Fémis, France
Wild Horses		Rory Stewart	NFTS, United Kingdom

=== Short Films Competition ===
Out of 4,843 entries, the following films were selected to compete for the Short Film Palme d'Or.

English Title	Original Title	Director(s)	Production Country
Across My Land		Fiona Godivier	United States
The Ceiling	Katto	Teppo Airaksinen	Finland
Damiana		Andrés Ramírez Pulido	Colombia
A Drowning Man		Mahdi Fleifel	United Kingdom, Denmark, Greece
A Gentle Night	小城二月	Qiu Yang	China
Grandpa Walrus	Pépé le morse	Lucrèce Andreae	France
Lunch Time	وقت ناهار	Alireza Ghasemi	Iran
Push It		Julia Thelin	Sweden
Time to Go	Koniec widzenia	Grzegorz Mołda	Poland

=== Cannes Classics ===
The full line-up for the Cannes Classics section was announced on 3 May 2017.

English Title	Original Title	Director(s)	Production Country
Restorations
All That Jazz (1979)		Bob Fosse	United States
L'Atalante (1934)		Jean Vigo	France
Babatu (1976)	Babatou, les trois conseils	Jean Rouch	Niger, France
The Ballad of Narayama (1983)	楢山節考	Shōhei Imamura	Japan
The Battle of the Rails (1946)	La Bataille du rail	René Clément	France
Belle de Jour (1967)	Belle de jour	Luis Buñuel	France, Italy
Blow-Up (1966)	Blowup	Michelangelo Antonioni	United Kingdom, Italy, United States
Dream of Light aka The Quince Tree Sun (1992)	El sol del membrillo	Víctor Erice	Spain
Duo (1968)	Pas de deux	Norman McLaren	Canada
The Earrings of Madame de... (1953)	Madame de...	Max Ophüls	France, Italy
Harpya (1979)		Raoul Servais	Belgium
I Even Met Happy Gypsies (1967)	Skupljači perja	Aleksandar Petrović	Yugoslavia
In the Realm of the Senses (1976)	愛のコリーダ	Nagisa Oshima	Japan, France
L'Interview (1998)		Xavier Giannoli	France
Lucía (1968)		Humberto Solás	Cuba
Man of Iron (1981)	Człowiek z żelaza	Andrzej Wajda	Poland
Matzor (1969)	מצור	Gilberto Tofano	Israel
Merry-Go-Round (1956)	Körhinta	Zoltán Fábri	Hungary
Mirror of Holland (1950)	Spiegel van Holland	Bert Haanstra	Netherlands
Native Son (1951)		Pierre Chenal	Argentina, United States
Soleil O (1970)		Med Hondo	France, Mauritania
Paparazzi (1964)		Jacques Rozier	France
Peel (1986)		Jane Campion	Australia
A River Runs Through It (1992)		Robert Redford	United States
The Seine Meets Paris (1957)	La Seine a rencontré Paris	Joris Ivens	France
Unforgiven (1992)		Clint Eastwood	United States
The Wages of Fear (1953)	Le Salaire de la peur	Henri-Georges Clouzot	France, Italy
The Way (1982)	Yol	Yılmaz Güney	Turkey, Switzerland, France
When the Day Breaks (1999)		Wendy Tilby and Amanda Forbis	Canada
Whither? (1957)	إلى أين؟	Georges Nasser	Lebanon
Documentaries about Cinema
Becoming Cary Grant (ŒdO)		Mark Kidel	United States, United Kingdom, France
The Belgian Road to Cannes (ŒdO)	La belge histoire du Festival de Cannes	Henri de Gerlache	Belgium
David Stratton: A Cinematic Life (ŒdO)		Sally Aitken	Australia
Filmworker (ŒdO)		Tony Zierra	United States
Restless Child (ŒdO)	Jean Douchet, l'enfant agité	Fabien Hagège, Guillaume Namur and Vincent Haasser	France

(ŒdO) indicates film eligible for the Œil d'or as documentary.

=== Cinéma de la Plage ===
The Cinéma de la Plage is a part of the Official Selection of the festival. The outdoors screenings at the beach cinema of Cannes are open to the public.

English Title	Original Title	Director(s)	Production Country
All About My Mother (1999)	Todo sobre mi madre	Pedro Almodóvar	Spain
August 32nd on Earth (1998)	Un 32 Août sur terre	Denis Villeneuve	Canada
Bugsy Malone (1976)		Alan Parker	United Kingdom
Chariots of Fire (1981)		Hugh Hudson	United Kingdom
Djam		Tony Gatlif	France, Greece, Turkey
Missing (1982)		Costa Gavras	United States
Saturday Night Fever (1977)		John Badham	United States
Weekend at Dunkirk (1964)	Week-end à Zuydcoote	Henri Verneuil	France, Italy

== Parallel sections ==
=== Critics' Week ===
The full selection for the Critics' Week section was announced on 21 April 2017, at the section's website. Sicilian Ghost Story, directed by Fabio Grassadonia and Antonio Piazza, was selected as the opening film for the Critics' Week section, while Brigsby Bear, directed by Dave McCary, was selected as its closing film. The feature film competition included, for the first time in the section's history, an animated film and a documentary film.

English title	Original title	Director(s)	Production country
In Competition
Ava (CdO)		Léa Mysius	France
The Family (CdO)	La familia	Gustavo Rondón Córdova	Venezuela, Chile, Norway
Gabriel and the Mountain	Gabriel e a montanha	Fellipe Gamarano Barbosa	Brazil, France
Makala (ŒdO)		Emmanuel Gras	France
Oh Lucy! (CdO)		Atsuko Hirayanagi	Japan, United States
Los Perros		Marcela Said	Chile, France
Tehran Taboo (CdO)	تهران تابو	Ali Soozandeh	Germany, Austria
Short Films Competition
The Best Fireworks Ever	Najpiękniejsze fajerwerki ever	Aleksandra Terpińska	Poland
Children Leave at Dawn	Les Enfants partent à l'aube	Manon Coubia	France
Los Desheredados (ŒdO)		Laura Ferrés	Spain
Ela – Sketches on a Departure	Ela - Szkice na Pozegnanie	Oliver Adam Kusio	Germany
Exposure	Le Visage	Salvatore Lista	France
Jodilerks Dela Cruz, Employee of the Month		Carlo Francisco Manatad	Philippines, Singapore
Möbius		Sam Kuhn	United States, Canada
Real Gods Require Blood		Moin Hussain	United Kingdom
Selva		Sofía Quirós Ubeda	Costa Rica, Argentina, Chile
The Tesla World Light	Tesla: lumière mondiale	Matthew Rankin	Canada
Special Screenings
After School Knife Fight		Caroline Poggi and Jonathan Vinel	France
Bad Bunny	Coelho Mau	Carlos Conceição	Portugal, France
Bloody Milk (CdO)	Petit Paysan	Hubert Charuel	France
Brigsby Bear (CdO) (closing film)		Dave McCary	United States
Islands	Les Îles	Yann Gonzalez	France
Sicilian Ghost Story (opening film)		Fabio Grassadonia and Antonio Piazza	Italy
A Violent Life	Une vie violente	Thierry de Peretti	France

(CdO) indicates film eligible for the Caméra d'Or as directorial debut feature.
(ŒdO) film eligible for the Œil d'or as documentary.

=== Directors' Fortnight ===
The full selection for the Directors' Fortnight section was announced on 20 April 2017, at the section's website.

English title	Original title	Director(s)	Production country
A Ciambra		Jonas Carpignano	Italy, France, Germany
Alive in France (ŒdO)		Abel Ferrara	France
Bushwick		Cary Murnion and Jonathan Milott	United States
The Dragon Defense (CdO)	La Defensa del Dragón	Natalia Santa	Colombia
The Florida Project		Sean Baker	United States
Frost	Šerkšnas	Šarūnas Bartas	Lithuania, France, Poland, Ukraine
I Am Not a Witch (CdO)		Rungano Nyoni	United Kingdom, France, Germany, Zambia
The Intruder	L'Intrusa	Leonardo Di Costanzo	Italy, France, Switzerland
Jeannette: The Childhood of Joan of Arc	Jeannette, l'enfance de Jeanne d'Arc	Bruno Dumont	France
Just to Be Sure	Ôtez-moi d'un Doute	Carine Tardieu	France, Belgium
Let the Sunshine In (opening film)	Un beau soleil intérieur	Claire Denis	France
Lover for a Day	L'Amant d'un jour	Philippe Garrel	France
Marlina the Murderer in Four Acts (QP)	Marlina Si Pembunuh Dalam Empat Babak	Mouly Surya	Indonesia
Mobile Homes		Vladimir de Fontenay	Canada, France
Nothingwood (CdO) (ŒdO) (QP)		Sonia Kronlund	France, Germany
Patti Cake$ (CdO) (closing film)		Geremy Jasper	United States
Pure Hearts (CdO)	Cuori Puri	Roberto De Paolis	Italy
The Rider		Chloé Zhao	United States
West of the Jordan River (Field Diary Revisited) (ŒdO)	ממערב לירדן	Amos Gitai	Israel
Special Screenings
The Nothing Factory	A Fábrica de Nada	Pedro Pinho	Portugal
Short Films
Água Mole		Laura Goncalves and Alexandra Ramires	Portugal
Back to Genoa City (ŒdO)	Retour à Genoa City	Benoit Grimalt	France
La Bouche		Camilo Restrepo	France
The Burden	Min Börda	Niki Lindroth von Bahr	Sweden
Copa-Loca		Christos Massalas	Greece
Crème de menthe		Philippe David Gagné and Jean-Marc E. Roy	Canada
Farpões, Baldios		Marta Mateus	Portugal
Nothing	Nada	Gabriel Martins	Brazil
Tijuana Tales		Jean-Charles Hue	France
Trešnje		Dubravka Turić	Croatia

(CdO) indicates film eligible for the Caméra d'Or as directorial debut feature.
(ŒdO) film eligible for the Œil d'or as documentary.
(QP) film eligible for the Queer Palm.

=== ACID ===
ACID, an association of French and foreign film directors, demonstrates its support for nine films each year, seeking to provide support from filmmakers to other filmmakers. The full ACID selection was announced on 21 April 2017:

==== Feature films ====
English title	Original title	Director(s)	Production country
The Assembly	L'Assemblée	Mariana Otero	France
Before Summer Ends	Avant la fin de l'été	Maryam Goormaghtigh	France, Switzerland
Belinda		Marie Dumora	France
Coby (QP)		Christian Sonderegger	France
Kiss and Cry		Lila Pinell, Chloé Mahieu	France
Last Laugh		Zhang Tao	Hong Kong, France
No Farewells	Sans Adieu	Christophe Agou	France
Scaffoldling		Matan Yair	Israel, Poland
The Starry Sky Above Me	Le Ciel étoilé au-dessus de ma tête	Ilan Klipper	France

(QP) indicates film eligible for the Queer Palm.

==== Special Screenings ====
English title	Original title	Director(s)	Production country
Comfort and Consolation in France	Pour le réconfort	Vincent Macaigne	France

==== ACID Trip #1 – Serbia ====
English title	Original title	Director(s)	Production country
Dos Patrias		Kosta Ristić	Serbia, Cuba
Emergency Exit	Izlaz u slučaju opasnosti	Vladimir Tagić	Serbia
A Handful of Stones	Kamen u ruci	Stefan Ivancić	Serbia
Humidity	Vlažnost	Nikola Ljuca	Serbia, Netherlands, Greece
If I had it my way I would never leave		Marko Grba Singh	Serbia
Requiem for Mrs. J	Rekvijem za gospodju J.	Bojan Vuletić	Serbia, Bulgaria, Macedonia, Russia, France, Germany
Transition	Tranzicija	Milica Tomović	Serbia

== Official awards ==
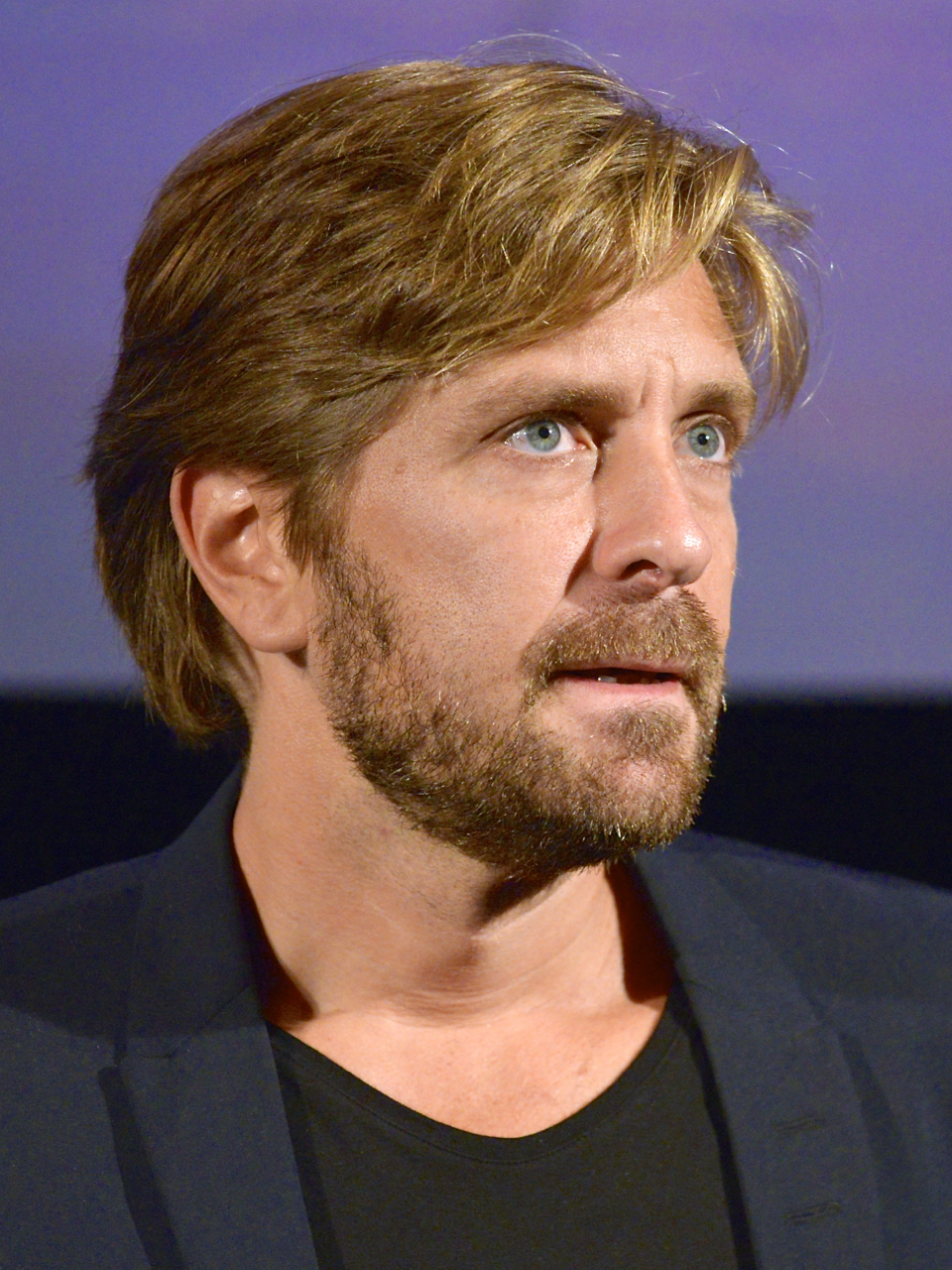
Ruben Östlund, winner of the 2017 Palme d'Or

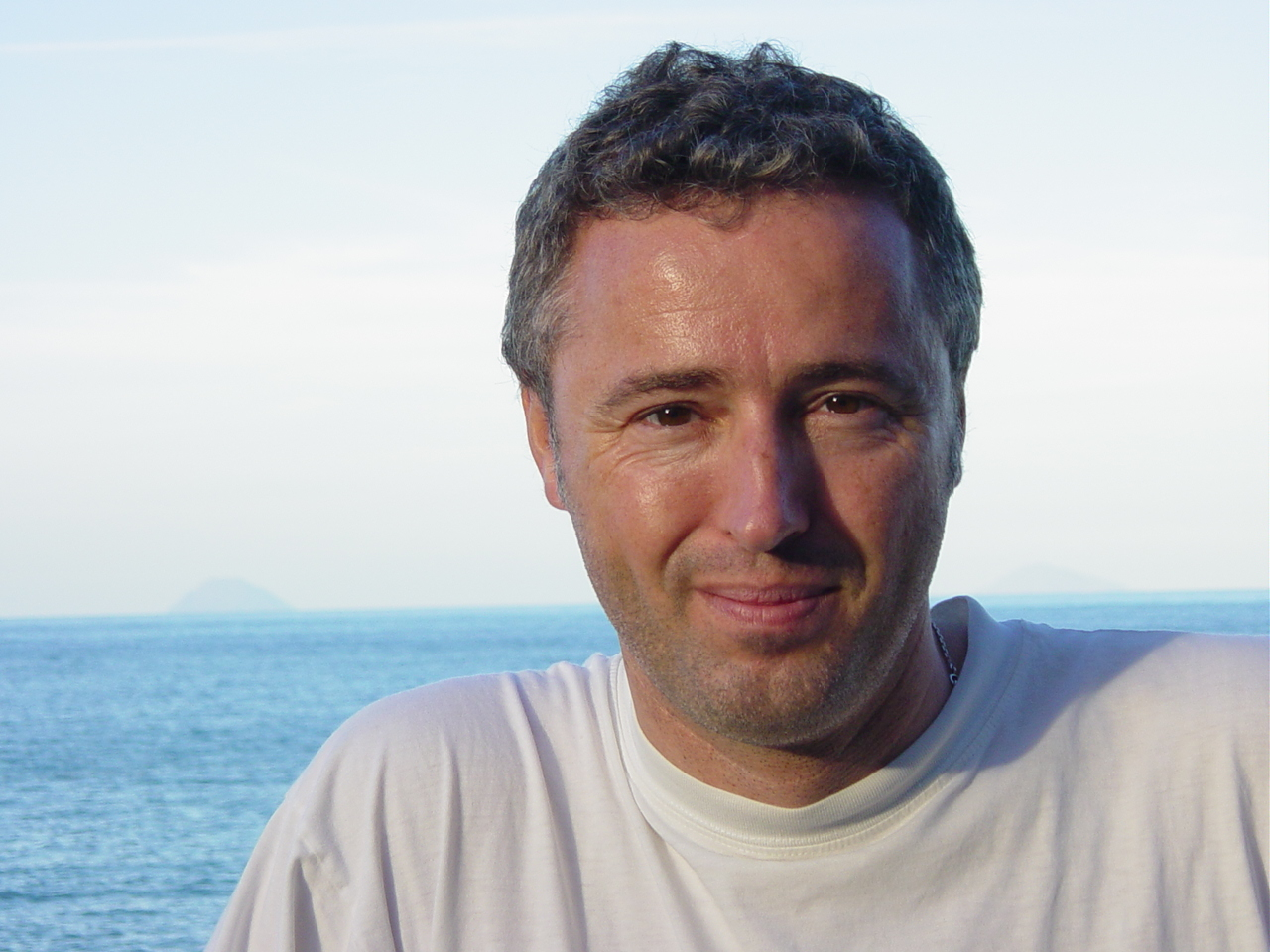
Robin Campillo, winner of the Grand Prix

=== In Competition ===
- Palme d'Or: The Square by Ruben Östlund
- Grand Prix: BPM (Beats per Minute) by Robin Campillo
- Best Director: Sofia Coppola for The Beguiled
- Best Actor: Joaquin Phoenix for You Were Never Really Here
- Best Actress: Diane Kruger for In the Fade
- Jury Prize: Loveless by Andrey Zvyagintsev
- Best Screenplay:
  - Yorgos Lanthimos and Efthimis Filippou for The Killing of a Sacred Deer
  - Lynne Ramsay for You Were Never Really Here
- 70th Anniversary Prize: Nicole Kidman

=== Honorary Palme d'Or ===
- Jeffrey Katzenberg

=== Un Certain Regard ===
- Un Certain Regard Award: A Man of Integrity by Mohammad Rasoulof
- Un Certain Regard Jury Prize: April's Daughter by Michel Franco
- Un Certain Regard Award for Best Director: Taylor Sheridan for Wind River
- Un Certain Regard Jury Award for Best Performance: Jasmine Trinca for Fortunata
- The Poetry of Cinema Award: Barbara by Mathieu Amalric

=== Cinéfondation ===
- First Prize: Paul Is Here by Valentina Maurel
- Second Prize: Animal by Bahman and Bahram Ark
- Third Prize: Two Youths Died by Tommaso Usberti

=== Caméra d'Or ===
- Montparnasse Bienvenue by Léonor Serraille

=== Short Films Competition ===
- Short Film Palme d'Or: A Gentle Night by Qiu Yang
  - Special Mention: The Ceiling by Teppo Airaksinen

== Independent awards ==
=== FIPRESCI Prizes ===
- BPM (Beats per Minute) by Robin Campillo (In Competition)
- Closeness by Kantemir Balagov (Un Certain Regard)
- The Nothing Factory by Pedro Pinho (Directors' Fortnight)

=== Prize of the Ecumenical Jury ===
- Radiance by Naomi Kawase

=== Critics' Week ===
- Nespresso Grand Prize: Makala by Emmanuel Gras
- France 4 Visionary Award: Gabriel and the Mountain by Fellipe Gamarano Barbosa
- Leica Cine Discovery Prize for Short Film: Los Desheredados by Laura Ferrés
- Gan Foundation Support for Distribution Award: Gabriel and the Mountain by Fellipe Gamarano Barbosa
- SACD Award: Ava by Léa Mysius
- Canal+ Award: The Best Fireworks Ever by Aleksandra Terpińska

=== Directors' Fortnight ===
- Art Cinema Award: The Rider by Chloé Zhao
- SACD Award:
  - Let the Sunshine In by Claire Denis
  - Lover for a Day by Philippe Garrel
- Europa Cinemas Label Award: A Ciambra by Jonas Carpignano
- Illy Prize for Short Film: Back to Genoa City by Benoit Grimalt
- Carrosse d'Or: Werner Herzog

=== L'Œil d'or ===
- Faces Places by Agnès Varda and JR
  - Special Mention: Makala by Emmanuel Gras

=== Queer Palm ===
- BPM (Beats per Minute) by Robin Campillo
- Short Film Queer Palm: Islands by Yann Gonzalez

=== Palm Dog ===
- Palm Dog Award: Einstein for The Meyerowitz Stories (New and Selected)
- Grand Jury Prize: Lupo for Ava
- Palm DogManitarian Award: Leslie Caron and her 17-year-old pet rescue dog Tchi Tchi

=== Prix François Chalais ===
- BPM (Beats per Minute) by Robin Campillo

=== Vulcan Award of the Technical Artist ===
- Josefin Åsberg for The Square (set decoration)

=== Cannes Soundtrack Award ===
- Oneohtrix Point Never for Good Time

=== Chopard Trophy ===
- Anya Taylor-Joy
- George MacKay
