= Paris, 13th District =

2021 film by Jacques Audiard

- Theatrical release poster
- French: Les Olympiades
- Directed by: Jacques Audiard
- Screenplay by: Céline Sciamma; Léa Mysius; Jacques Audiard
- Based on: Amber Sweet; Killing and Dying; Hawaiian Getaway; by Adrian Tomine
- Produced by: Valérie Schermann
- Starring: Lucie Zhang; Makita Samba; Noémie Merlant; Jehnny Beth
- Cinematography: Paul Guilhaume
- Edited by: Juliette Welfling
- Music by: Rone
- Production companies: Page 114; France 2 Cinéma; Canal+; Ciné+; France Télévisions; Playtime; Memento Films; Cofinova 17
- Distributed by: Memento Distribution
- Release dates: 14 July 2021 (Cannes); 3 November 2021 (France)
- Running time: 106 minutes
- Country: France
- Languages: French; Mandarin
- Box office: $2.5 million

The zone of Les Olympiades, 13th arrondissement of Paris, from which the film takes its name

Paris, 13th District (French: Les Olympiades) is a 2021 French drama film directed by Jacques Audiard, from a screenplay he co-wrote with Céline Sciamma and Léa Mysius, loosely based on the short comic stories Amber Sweet and Killing and Dying from the book of the latter's name, and Hawaiian Getaway from the book Summer Blonde, all by American cartoonist Adrian Tomine. It stars Lucie Zhang, Makita Samba, Noémie Merlant and Jehnny Beth.

== Plot ==
Émilie, a call center operator for a phone service provider, is living in an apartment in the Les Olympiades complex belonging to her terminally ill grandmother. Facing difficulties making rent, she places advertisements for a roommate, to which Camille, a teacher returning to university for his doctoral degree, responds. Émilie is initially hesitant to rent to a man, but the two quickly develop a sexual relationship. They each agree that they are uninterested in becoming a couple, but Émilie develops feelings for Camille and becomes frustrated when he refuses to have sex with her one night. The next day, they decide to stop having sex, and Camille romantically pursues a co-worker. When he invites that co-worker over, Émilie goes to a party, takes MDMA, sleeps with a woman, and then has an anxiety attack after returning to her apartment and overhearing Camille having sex with his partner. Émilie takes her jealousy and frustration (having recently lost her job) out on Camille, who decides to move in with his partner.

Attending the same university as Camille is Nora, a 33-year-old in the second year of her undergraduate law degree. She spent most of her early adulthood working for a real estate firm owned by her uncle by marriage, with whom she had a ten-year sexual relationship. Nora has few friends and finds it difficult to relate to her younger classmates. She impulsively buys a blonde wig and attends an energetic college party wearing the wig. At the party, she is mistaken for well-known camgirl Amber Sweet, who wears a similar wig, and is harassed by fellow students until she leaves the party. The next day, Nora is mocked by students in her class who think she is Amber; she drops out shortly afterwards.

Needing a job, Nora applies for a position in a small real estate firm that happens to be managed by Camille, who has since broken up with his former co-worker and taken over the firm from a relative to supplement his income. Nora decides to set platonic boundaries between herself and Camille, but eventually becomes attracted to him, and they enter into a relationship. Camille re-establishes a prickly friendship with Émilie, who has since become a waiter. Camille asks Émilie for advice with his current relationship, but her love for him makes her unable to broach the subject. Meanwhile, Nora tracks Amber down and buys camming time with her to discuss the incident of mistaken identity. Over the course of many video chats, they become close friends.

Nora and Camille's relationship becomes strained, and they eventually part ways after a sexual encounter in which Nora dominates Camille. On the same night, Émilie's grandmother dies. When Émilie tells Camille that she feels unable to face her family at the funeral on the coming Sunday, Camille offers to accompany her. Émilie is angered by this offer and asks Camille to either attend the funeral (and thus commit to a relationship with her) or else cut contact with her. That Sunday, Nora and Amber meet in a park. Nora faints after greeting Amber, and then asks her to kiss her. In Les Olympiades, Émilie is preparing to attend the funeral alone when her apartment phone rings; it is Camille waiting for her. Émilie asks Camille to explain why he has come until Camille admits that he loves her. She then hangs up the phone to join Camille outside.

== Cast ==
- Lucie Zhang as Émilie Wong
- Makita Samba as Camille Germain
- Noémie Merlant as Nora Ligier
- Jehnny Beth as Amber Sweet/Louise
- Océane Caïraty as Stéphanie

== Production ==
In September 2020, it was announced Jacques Audiard would direct and produce the film, from a screenplay he wrote alongside Céline Sciamma and Léa Mysius, with principal photography commencing that same month.

In October 2020, Lucie Zhang, Makita Samba, Noémie Merlant and Jehnny Beth joined the cast of the film.

== Release ==
In March 2021, IFC Films and Curzon Artificial Eye acquired US and UK distribution rights to the film, respectively.

Paris, 13th District had its world premiere at the Cannes Film Festival on 14 July 2021. It had its North American premiere at the 2021 Toronto International Film Festival in September. On 9 October 2021, it was the closing night film at Filmfest Hamburg. It was released theatrically in France on 3 November 2021 by Memento Distribution.

== Reception ==
On the review aggregator website Rotten Tomatoes, Paris, 13th District holds an approval rating of 83% based on 112 reviews, with an average rating of 6.9/10. The website's critics consensus reads, "Minor but engaging Audiard, Paris, 13th District explores millennial love through a visually compelling lens that's partly undercut by its episodic narrative structure." Metacritic, which uses a weighted average, assigned the film a score of 76 out of 100, based on 34 critics, indicating "generally favorable" reviews.
