= A Real Job =

- Theatrical release poster
- French: Un métier sérieux
- Directed by: Thomas Lilti
- Screenplay by: Thomas Lilti
- Produced by: Agnès Vallée; Emmanuel Barraux
- Starring: Vincent Lacoste; François Cluzet; Adèle Exarchopoulos; Louise Bourgoin; William Lebghil; Lucie Zhang; Bouli Lanners
- Cinematography: Antoine Héberlé
- Edited by: Gwen Mallauran; Matthieu Ruyssen
- Music by: Jonathan Morali
- Production companies: 31 Juin Films; Les Films du Parc; France 2 Cinéma; Le Pacte; Les Films de Benjamin
- Distributed by: Le Pacte
- Release date: 13 September 2023
- Country: France
- Language: French
- Box office: $3.5 million

A Real Job (French: Un métier sérieux) is a 2023 French comedy-drama film written and directed by Thomas Lilti which stars Vincent Lacoste along with François Cluzet, Adèle Exarchopoulos, Louise Bourgoin, William Lebghil, Lucie Zhang, and Bouli Lanners.

== Plot ==
The plot follows the life of Benjamin, a young PhD student doing a substitution as a maths teacher in a suburban French school, coming across a group of fellow teachers that include Pierre, Meriem, Sandrine, and Fouad.

== Cast ==
- Vincent Lacoste as Benjamin
- François Cluzet as Pierre
- Adèle Exarchopoulos as Meriem
- Louise Bourgoin as Sandrine
- William Lebghil as Fouad
- Lucie Zhang as Sophie
- Bouli Lanners as le père de Benjamin ('Benjamin's father')
- Léo Chalié as Alix
- Théo Navarro-Mussy as Sofiane
- Mustapha Abourachid as M. Baderos, le principal

== Production ==
The film was produced by 31 Juin Films and Les Films du Parc alongside France 2 Cinéma, Le Pacte and Les Films de Benjamin.

== Release ==
Distributed by Le Pacte, the film was released theatrically in France on 13 September 2023. It also made it to the official selection lineup of the 71st San Sebastián International Film Festival, in a special screening, out of competition, slot.

== Reception ==
A Real Job received an average rating of 3.5 out of 5 stars on the French website AlloCiné, based on 35 reviews.

Frédéric Strauss of Télérama wrote that the film "builds a fictional mosaic that has a lot to say, seriously and also amusingly, about the life of teachers".

Fabien Lemercier of Cineuropa deemed A Real Job to be "a funny, instructive and moving ensemble film about school teachers".
