= Paul Guilhaume =

French cinematographer

- Education: Sorbonne
- Occupation: Cinematographer

Paul Guilhaume is a French cinematographer. He was nominated for an Academy Award in the category Best Cinematography for the film Emilia Pérez.

At the 50th César Awards, he won a César Award for Best Cinematography.

== Personal life ==
Guilhaume is in a relationship with filmmaker Léa Mysius.

== Selected filmography ==
Key
| † | Denotes films that have not yet been released |

=== Feature films ===
| Year | Title | Director | Notes |
|---|---|---|---|
| 2016 | The Lives of Thérèse | Sébastien Lifshitz | |
| 2017 | Ava | Léa Mysius | Also collaborating screenwriter |
| 2018 | Treat Me Like Fire | Marie Monge | |
| 2019 | Adolescents | Sébastien Lifshitz | |
| 2020 | Little Girl | Sébastien Lifshitz | |
| 2021 | Paris, 13th District | Jacques Audiard | |
| 2022 | The Five Devils | Léa Mysius | Also screenwriter |
| 2022 | Casa Susanna | Sébastien Lifshitz | |
| 2024 | Emilia Pérez | Jacques Audiard | |
| TBA | Une affaire † | Arnaud Desplechin | Post-production |
