= After the War (film) =

2017 film directed by Annarita Zambrano

- Film poster
- Directed by: Annarita Zambrano
- Written by: Annarita Zambrano
- Starring: Giuseppe Battiston; Charlotte Cétaire; Barbora Bobuľová
- Release date: 23 May 2017 (Cannes)
- Running time: 93 minutes
- Country: France
- Language: French

After the War (French: Après la guerre) is a 2017 French drama film that was directed by Annarita Zambrano and was screened in the Un Certain Regard section at the 2017 Cannes Film Festival.

== Plot ==
In Bologna, in 2002, protests against labour reform exploded in universities. The murder of Marco Biagi, an expert in labour law, awakens old political wounds between Italy and France. Marco, a former extreme left activist, convicted of homicide and refugee in France for 20 years thanks to the Mitterrand doctrine, which allows ex-terrorists to find asylum on the other side of the Alps, is suspected of being the sponsor of the attack. When the Italian government requests extradition, Marco decides to escape to Nicaragua with his teenage daughter Viola. His life changes and also drags into the abyss his Italian family, who finds himself overnight forced to pay for his past mistakes.

== Cast ==
- Barbora Bobulova
- Giuseppe Battiston
- Fabrizio Ferracane
- Orfeo Orlando
- Charlotte Cétaire
