= Léa Mysius =

French film director and screenwriter

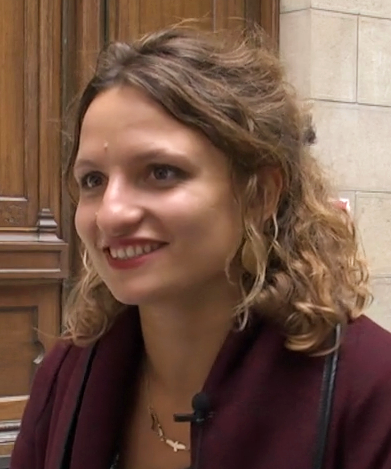
- Mysius in 2014
- Born: 4 April 1989 (age 37); Bordeaux, France
- Occupations: Film director, screenwriter
- Years active: 2013–present

Léa Mysius (born 4 April 1989) is a French film director and screenwriter. In 2017, she made her feature directorial debut with the film Ava, which premiered at the 2017 Cannes Film Festival where it won the SACD Award. Her second feature film, The Five Devils, was screened in the Directors' Fortnight section at the 2022 Cannes Film Festival. As a screenwriter, Mysius has also collaborated with Arnaud Desplechin on Ismael's Ghosts (2017) and Oh Mercy! (2019), Jacques Audiard on Paris, 13th District (2021) and Emilia Pérez (2024), and Claire Denis on Stars at Noon (2022).

== Early life and education ==
Mysius grew up in the Médoc region of France but moved to Réunion at the age of 13. Her twin sister is set designer Esther Mysius, with whom she often collaborates on film projects. Her brother, Nathan Mysius, also works in the film industry.

At age 17, Mysius obtained a baccalauréat scientifique. She studied literature at the Sorbonne in Paris. In 2010, she entered La Fémis, studying in the screenwriting department. She graduated from La Fémis in 2014.

== Career ==
She made her directorial debut in 2013 with the short film Cadavre exquis, for which she also wrote the screenplay. The film won the Prix SACD de la meilleure première oeuvre de fiction at the 2013 Clermont-Ferrand International Short Film Festival. Her 2014 short film Thunderbirds (French: Les oiseaux-tonnerre), which Mysius directed and for which she wrote the screenplay, was also a success at festivals. It was nominated for the Grand Jury Prize in the European Student Films category at the 2015 Angers European First Film Festival and was nominated for the Cinéfondation Selection at the 2014 Cannes Film Festival. L'île jaune, co-directed with Paul Guilhaume in 2016, won the Grand Jury Prize in the French First Short Films category at the 2016 Angers European First Film Festival.

In 2017, Mysius co-wrote the screenplay for Arnaud Desplechin's Ismael's Ghosts, which premiered at the opening of the 2017 Cannes Film Festival. Mysius was also represented at Cannes 2017 with her feature film directorial debut, Ava. The films follows a 13-year-old girl named Ava (Noée Abita) who spends a summer by the sea shortly before she goes completely blind due to retinitis pigmentosa. Mysius wrote the film's screenplay, which was also her graduation project at La Fémis. Paul Guilhaume, with whom she had worked on L'île jaune, was the film's cinematographer. At Cannes, Ava was nominated for the Caméra d'Or and won the Prix SACD for Best Feature. The film also received nominations for the Bronze Horse at the 2017 Stockholm International Film Festival and the Sutherland Award in the First Feature Competition at the 2017 BFI London Film Festival.

In 2019, Mysius once again collaborated with Desplechin, co-writing the screenplay for his film Oh Mercy!. In 2020, Mysius and Desplechin received a César Award nomination in the category Best Adaptation for their screenplay, which they adapted from Mosco Boucault's France 3 television documentary film Roubaix, commissariat central (2008).

Her second feature film as director, The Five Devils (Les cinq diables), was selected to be screened in the Directors' Fortnight section at the 2022 Cannes Film Festival. Myisus also co-wrote the script for Claire Denis' 2022 film Stars at Noon with Denis and Andrew Litvack, adapted from the novel The Stars at Noon by American author Denis Johnson. Stars at Noon also had its world premiere at the 2022 Cannes Film Festival, where it was selected to compete for the Palme d'Or.

In 2024, she had collaboration credits on the screenplays of two films: Claire Burger's coming-of-age drama Langue étrangère and Jacques Audiard's musical Emilia Pérez.

== Personal life ==
Mysius is in a relationship with cinematographer Paul Guilhaume.

== Filmography ==
=== Feature films ===
| Year | English title | Original title | Notes |
|---|---|---|---|
| 2017 | Ava | | |
| 2022 | The Five Devils | Les Cinq Diables | Co-written with Paul Guilhaume |
| 2026 | The Birthday Party | Histoires de la nuit | |

==== Only writer ====
| Year | English title | Original title | Notes |
|---|---|---|---|
| 2017 | Ismael's Ghosts | Les fantômes d'Ismaël | Co-written with Arnaud Desplechin and Julie Peyr |
| 2018 | Samouni Road | La strada dei Samouni | Co-written with Stefano Savona and Penelope Bortoluzzi |
| 2019 | Farewell to the Night | L'Adieu à la nuit | Co-written with André Téchiné |
| 2019 | Oh Mercy! | Roubaix, une lumière | Co-written with Arnaud Desplechin |
| 2021 | Paris, 13th District | Les Olympiades | Co-written with Jacques Audiard and Céline Sciamma |
| 2022 | Stars at Noon | | Co-written with Claire Denis and Andrew Litvack |
| 2024 | Langue étrangère | Fremdsprache | Co-written with Claire Burger |
| 2024 | Emilia Pérez | | Co-written with Jacques Audiard, Thomas Bidegain and Nicolas Livecchi |

=== Short films ===
| Year | Title | Director | Screenwriter | Notes |
|---|---|---|---|---|
| 2013 | Cadavre exquis | Yes | Yes | |
| 2013 | L'éblouie | No | Yes | |
| 2013 | Fin d'automne | No | Yes | |
| 2013 | Ce qui nous échappe | No | Yes | |
| 2014 | Les oiseaux-tonnerre | Yes | Yes | |
| 2014 | One in a Million | No | Yes | Documentary |
| 2015 | Bison 6 | No | Yes | |
| 2016 | L'île jaune | Yes | Yes | |
| 2018 | Gueule d'Isère | No | No | Associate producer |
| 2019 | Plaisir fantôme | No | No | Associate producer |

== Awards and nominations ==
| Year | Festival | Award | Film | Result | Ref(s) |
|---|---|---|---|---|---|
| 2013 | Clermont-Ferrand International Short Film Festival | Prix SACD de la meilleure première oeuvre de fiction | Cadavre exquis | Won | |
| 2014 | Cannes Film Festival | Cinéfondation Selection | Les oiseaux-tonnerre | Nominated | |
| 2014 | San Sebastián International Film Festival | International Films Students Meeting | Les oiseaux-tonnerre | Second Prize | |
| 2015 | Angers European First Film Festival | Grand Jury Prize-European Student Films | Les oiseaux-tonnerre | Nominated | |
| 2016 | Angers European First Film Festival | Grand Jury Prize-French First Short Films | L'île jaune | Won | |
| 2017 | Cannes Film Festival | Prix SACD | Ava | Won | |
| 2017 | Cannes Film Festival | Camera d'Or | Ava | Nominated | |
| 2017 | Festival du nouveau cinéma | Louve d'Or | Ava | Won | |
| 2017 | Stockholm International Film Festival | Bronze Horse | Ava | Nominated | |
| 2017 | Prix Louis-Delluc | Best First Film | Ava | Nominated | |
| 2017 | BFI London Film Festival | Sutherland Award in the First Feature Competition | Ava | Nominated | |
| 2018 | Palm Springs International Film Festival | New Voices/New Visions Award | Ava | Honorable Mention for Exceptional Direction | |
| 2020 | César Awards | Best Adaptation | Oh Mercy! | Nominated | |
| 2022 | César Awards | Best Adaptation | Paris, 13th District | Nominated | |
| 2025 | Academy Awards | Best Adapted Screenplay | Emilia Pérez | Nominated | |
