= Ava (2017 French film) =

2017 film

- Film poster
- Directed by: Léa Mysius
- Written by: Léa Mysius
- Produced by: Jean-Louis Livi; Fanny Yvonnet
- Starring: Noée Abita; Laure Calamy; Juan Cano
- Cinematography: Paul Guilhaume
- Edited by: Pierre Deschamps
- Music by: Florencia Di Concilio
- Production companies: F comme film; Trois Brigands Productions; Arte France Cinéma
- Distributed by: BAC Films
- Release dates: 19 May 2017 (Cannes); 21 June 2017 (France)
- Running time: 105 minutes
- Country: France
- Language: French

Ava is a 2017 French drama film directed by Léa Mysius in her feature-length directorial debut.

It was screened in the Critics' Week section at the 2017 Cannes Film Festival. At Cannes, it won the SACD Award, and the lead animal actor, Lupo, won the Grand Jury Prize, Palm Dog.

== Plot ==
Ava is an unhappy 13-year-old, who is losing her sight from Retinitis Pigmentosa – a genetic condition which leads to her losing her night sight, then her peripheral vision, followed by total blindness. She is determined to live life to the full while she can see, exploring her approaching blindness and her constant nightmares which keep her awake at night.

She is attracted to an 18-year-old, Juan and his dog, who she names Lupo. Juan is a traveler in love with Jessica, over whom he fights but is stabbed. Ava comes across the wounded Juan, helping him to recover. Once he is better, they embark on a spree of robberies at the beach, helping Ava to cope with her sadness. This, and the fact that Juan is having sex with Ava, a minor, gets Juan into trouble with the police.

They escape from the police and Ava offers to help Juan recover his car keys and papers from his caravan so they can run away together. Ava joins Jessica's wedding on the traveler site to wait tables, then slips away when the cake is served. She finds Juan's wallet and driving license but can't find his car keys.

The police raid the wedding so that Juan and Ava are forced to run away without his car. While they are walking away, Jessica appears to give Juan his car, leaving her veil with Ava as a token of her love and support for the couple.

== Cast ==
- Noée Abita as Ava
- Laure Calamy as Maud, Ava's mother
- Juan Cano as Juan
- Tamara Cano as Jessica
- Daouda Diakhate as Tété
- Baptiste Archimbaud as Matthias
- Franck Beckmann as the ophthalmologist
- Carmen Gimenez as Carmen
- Valentine Cadic as Wedding waitress
- Ismaël Capelot

== Production ==
In a dreamy scene, Laure Calamy appears on a counter with her legs spread. It was the actress herself who suggested to director Léa Mysius that "we see a little more than the pubic hair, that the vulva is shown."

== Reception ==
On the review aggregator website Rotten Tomatoes, the film holds an approval rating of 85% based on 20 reviews, with an average rating of 7.6/10.

On IMDb, the movie has a rating of 6.6/10 as of Oct 3, 2026.
