= After the War (song) =

"After The War"
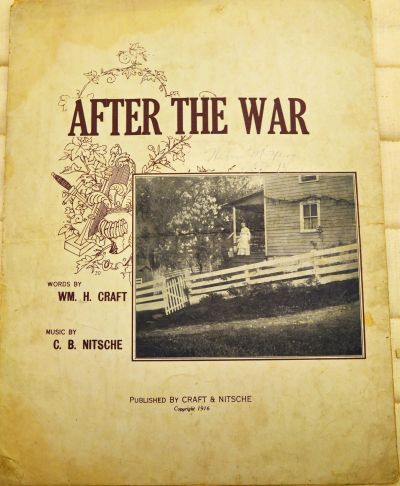
- Sheet Music Cover

Song
- Language: English
- Published: 1916
- Composer(s): Wm. H. Craft
- Lyricist(s): C. B. Nitsche

After The War is a World War I song written by Wm. H. Craft and composed by C. B. Nitsche. The song was self-published in 1916 by Craft & Nitsche. The sheet music cover depicts a country house with a woman receiving mail from the mailman.

The sheet music can be found at the Pritzker Military Museum & Library.
